= Timothey N'Guessan =

French handball player (born 1992)

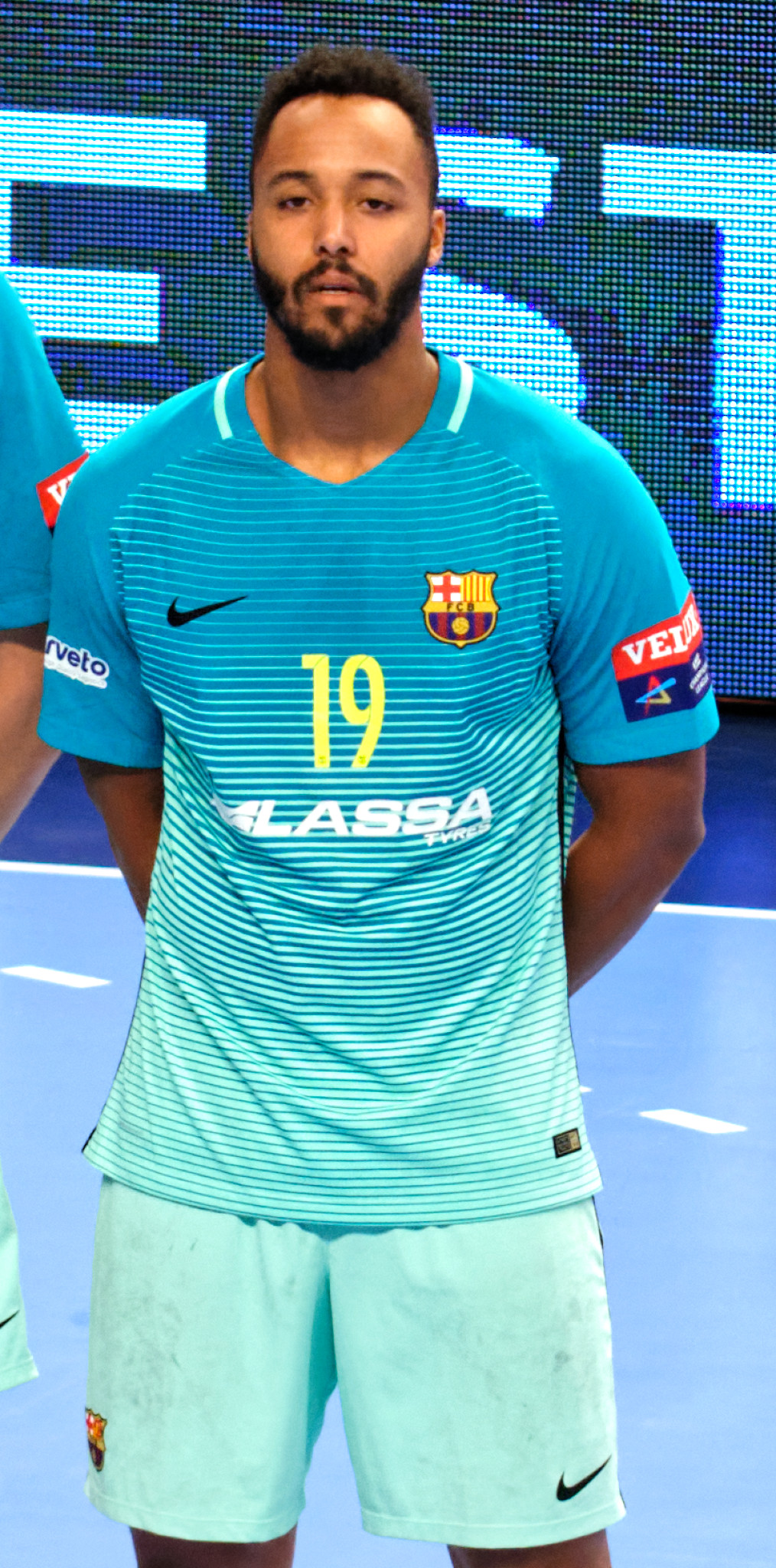
- N'guessan in 2016

Personal information
- Nationality: French
- Born: 18 September 1992 (age 34) Massy, France
- Height: 1.96 m (6 ft 5 in)

Sport
- Sport: Handball
- Position: Left back
- Current club: FC Barcelona
- Number: 19

Youth career
- Years: Team
- 2003–2008: Dieppe UC
- 2008–2011: SMV Porte Normande

Senior clubs
- Years: Team
- 2011–2016: Chambéry SH
- 2016–: FC Barcelona
National team
Years	Team	Apps	(Gls)
2012–	France	114	(255)
Medal record
Olympic Games
Gold medal – first place	2020 Tokyo	Team
Silver medal – second place	2016 Rio de Janeiro	Team
World Championship
Gold medal – first place	2017 France
Bronze medal – third place	2019 Germany/Denmark
European Championship
Gold medal – first place	2024 Germany
Bronze medal – third place	2018 Croatia
- Updated on 21 October 2024

Timothey N'Guessan (born 18 September 1992) is a French professional handball player for FC Barcelona and for the French national team. His achievements with the national team include winning a silver medal at the 2016 Summer Olympics, and a gold medal at the 2020 Summer Olympics and a gold medal at the 2017 World Championship. He has been made a knight (chevalier) of the French Legion of Honour.

== Career ==
N'Guessan played for Dieppe UC and SMV Porte Normande as a youth player, before joined Chambery Savoie Handball in 2011. Here he played 115 games, scoring 418, before he joined FC Barcelona. Here he has won both the Liga ASOBAL, Copa ASOBAL, Cope del Rey, as well as the IHF Super Globe in 2018 and 2019 and the EHF Champions League in 2021, 2022 and 2024.

== National team ==
He made his debut for the French national team on 7 January 2013 against Argentina.

At the 2016 Olympics he won a silver medal. A year later he won the 2017 World Championship.

At the 2018 European Men's Handball Championship and at the 2019 World Men's Handball Championship he won a bronze medal on both occasions.

At the 2020 Olympics he won a gold medal with France.

At the 2024 European Men's Handball Championship he completed the set of international gold medals. He was however injured during the preliminary rounds and replaced by Romain Lagarde, so he only played 3 games.

== Honours ==
=== Club, with FC Barcelona ===
- 10x Liga ASOBAL
  - Winner: 2017, 2018, 2019, 2020, 2021, 2022, 2023, 2024, 2025, 2026
- 10x Copa del Rey
  - Winner: 2017, 2018, 2019, 2020, 2021, 2022, 2023, 2024, 2025, 2026
- 10x Copa ASOBAL
  - Winner: 2017, 2018, 2019, 2020, 2021, 2022, 2023, 2024, 2025, 2026
- 6x Supercopa ASOBAL
  - Winner: 2016, 2017, 2018, 2019, 2020, 2021
- 5x Iberian Supercup
  - Winner: 2022, 2023, 2024, 2025, 2026
- 4x EHF Champions League
  - Winner: 2021, 2022, 2024, 2026
  - Runner-up: 2020
- 4x IHF Super Globe
  - Winner: 2017, 2018, 2019, 2025
  - Runner-up: 2021, 2022

== Personal life ==
N'Guessan was born in Massy on 18 September 1992.
