= Aitor Ariño =

Spanish handball player (born 1992)

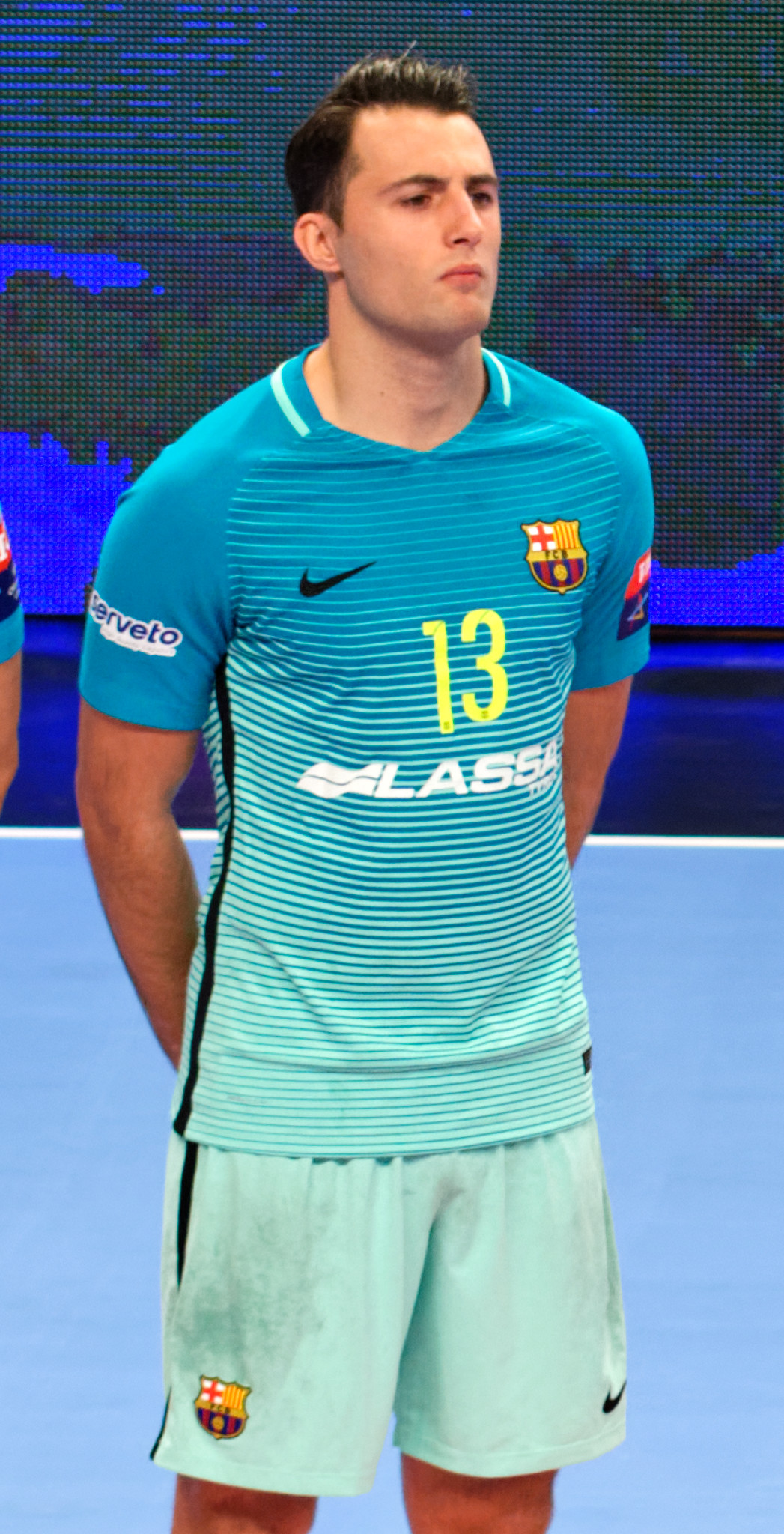

Personal information
- Full name: Aitor Ariño Bengoechea
- Nationality: Welsh; Spanish
- Born: 5 October 1992 (age 34) Penarth, Wales
- Height: 1.87 m (6 ft 2 in)

Sport
- Sport: Handball
- Position: Left wing
- Current club: FC Barcelona
- Number: 13

Youth career
- Years: Team
- 2004–2010: FC Barcelona

Senior clubs
- Years: Team
- 2010–2012: FC Barcelona B
- 2012–2025: FC Barcelona
- 2025–: Füchse Berlin
National team
Years	Team	Apps	(Gls)
2013–	Spain	89	(156)
Medal record
World Championship
Gold medal – first place	2013 Spain
Bronze medal – third place	2021 Egypt
European Championship
Gold medal – first place	2018 Croatia
Gold medal – first place	2020 Sweden/Austria/Norway
Silver medal – second place	2022 Hungary/Slovakia
Mediterranean Games
Bronze medal – third place	2018 Tarragona	Team
- Updated on 20 January 2025

Aitor Ariño Bengoechea (born 5 October 1992) is a Welsh-born Spanish handball player for FC Barcelona and the Spanish national team. He was part of the Spanish team that won the 2013 World Championship, as well as the 2018 and 2020 European Championships.

== Career ==
Aitor Ariño started playing handball at 7. In 2004 he was signed to the FC Barcelona U14 team. He made his senior debut on February 6th, 2014 under coach Xavier Pascual Fuertes in a league match against BM Cangas. In the following season he played mostly for the B-team in the 2nd tier, where he won the league twice in 2011-12 and 2012-13. He made his international debut in the 2012-13 EHF Champions League. From 2013 onwards he was a regular part of the Barcelona first team, where he has since once both the Spanish Championship, Copa del Rey, EHF Champions League and Copa ASOBAL. In December 2022 he was injured and missed the rest of the 2022-23 season. By January 2025 he has played 315 games for Barcelona, scoring 883 goals.

He agreed to join German Bundesliga team Füchse Berlin from the beginning of the 2025-26 season, on a contract until 2028.

=== National team ===
Aitor Ariño made his debut for the Spanish national team on January 6th, 2013 against Brazil.

For the 2013 World Championship he was included in the Spanish team to replace the injured Cristian Ugalde. It came as a bit of a surprise that he won chosen by Valero Rivera instead of Spanish all time top scorer Juanín García and the decision was criticized at the time. Spain would go on to win the tournament. At the 2018 European Championship he won his second gold medal with the Spanish team. He was however not originally part of the squad, and only entered the tournament after the first round to replace Ángel Fernández Pérez.

At the 2019 World Championship he finished 7th with the Spanish team. A year later he once again became European Champion, when Spain defended their title at the 2020 European Championship.

At the 2021 World Championship he finished third with the Spanish team, and at the 2022 European Championship he reached the final, where Spain lost to Sweden. He played all nine games, scoring 3 goals.

== Private life ==
His father, Sergi Ariño, is also a handball player, who played for FC Barcelona between 1986 and 1988.

== Honours ==
=== Club ===
- EHF Champions League
  - Winner: 2015,2021, 2022, 2024
- Liga ASOBAL:
  - Winner: 13 times; 2013-2025
- Copa del Rey:
  - Winner: 13 times; 2014-2025
- Copa ASOBAL:
  - Winner: 13 times; 2014-2025
- Spanish Supercup:
  - Winner: 9 times; 2013-2021
- Iberian Supercup:
  - Winner:: 2022, 2023, 2024
- Catalan Supercup
  - Winner:: 11 times: 2014-2024
- IHF Super Globe
  - Winner: 2013, 2014, 2017, 2018, 2019

=== National team ===
- World Championship
  - Winner: 2013
- European Championship
  - Silver medals: 2018, 2020
