= László Nagy (handballer) =

Hungarian handball player (born 1981)

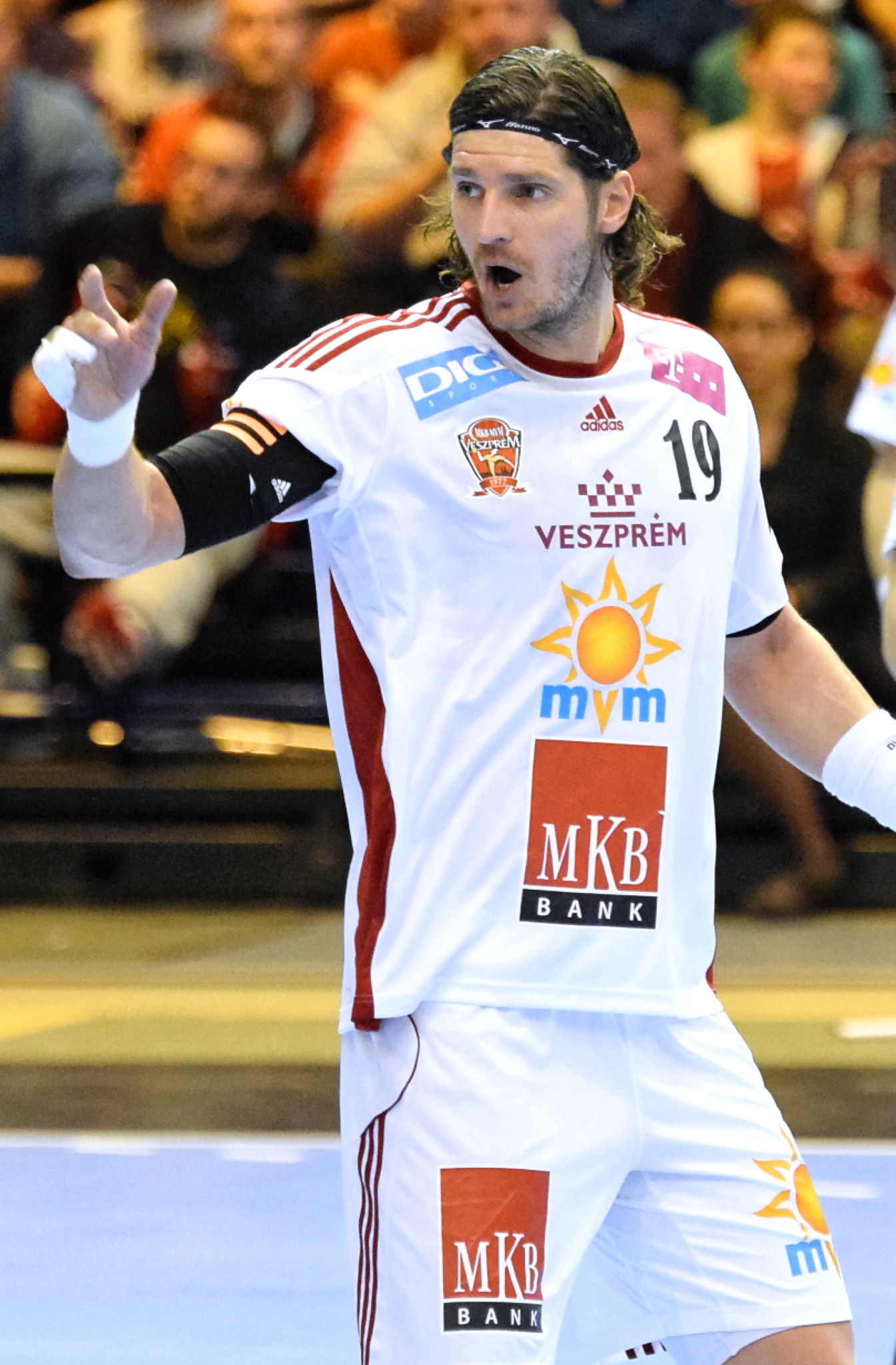
- Nagy in 2015

Personal information
- Full name: László Zoltán Nagy
- Nationality: Hungarian
- Born: 3 March 1981 (age 45) Székesfehérvár, Hungary
- Height: 2.08 m (6 ft 10 in)

Sport
- Sport: Handball
- Position: Right back
- Current club: Telekom Veszprém
- Number: 19

Youth career
- Years: Team
- 1994–1997: SC Pick Szeged

Senior clubs
- Years: Team
- 1997–2000: SC Pick Szeged
- 2000–2012: FC Barcelona
- 2012–2019: Telekom Veszprém
National team
Years	Team	Apps	(Gls)
1999–2019	Hungary	209	(749)
Medal record
Junior European Championship
Bronze medal – third place	1998 Austria
Youth European Championship
Gold medal – first place	1999 Portugal
Bronze medal – third place	1997 Estonia

László Nagy (born 3 March 1981) is a former Hungarian handball player who played for Telekom Veszprém, FC Barcelona, Pick Szeged and the Hungarian national team.

Among his achievements at club level are several Spanish championships and cup titles and he also won the EHF Champions League, the top continental competition in Europe two times (2005, 2011). With the Hungarian national team, Nagy's best results are two fourth places from the 2004 Summer Olympics and 2012 Summer Olympics

Nagy was voted by the readers of the handball journal Handball Planet as the world's best male player in 2011.

He was included in the European Handball Federation Hall of Fame in 2023.

On 10 May 2019 after 22 years of professional career, Laszló announced his retirement and took over as the sports director of Telekom Veszprém from the summer of 2019.

== Career ==
=== Club ===
He was born in Székesfehérvár and moved with his family to Szeged when he was a year old. His father was a professional basketball player, and Nagy began with basketball too.

He first played handball in elementary school; he was then a Hungarian international in both sports for his age group. When he was sixteen, he was given the option to move to the United States to become a professional basketball player, however, he decided to stay and pursue his handball career. His first professional club was Pick Szeged, where he came through the ranks quickly and made his senior debut in 1997.

His performances attracted the attention of many clubs, including FC Barcelona Handbol. Their head coach, Valero Rivera travelled to Hungary to meet with Nagy personally in 2000. The two agreed to an eight-year contract, and the right back switched to Barcelona officially in August 2000. With the Spanish team he developed into a quality player, known for his creative play, excellent passing skills and powerful shots. He played for the club for over ten years and has won almost all possible titles with them, both on the domestic and continental level, including the EHF Champions League trophy in 2005 and 2011.

=== International ===
He has represented Hungary from the youngest age group onward. He won a bronze medal in the Youth European Championship in 1997 and in the Junior European Championship 1998, and was crowned champion in the Youth European Championship in 1999. He made his full international debut in 1999 and participated in the 1999 World Championship. He played in a further six World Championships (2003, 2007, 2009, 2013, 2017, 2019) and four European Championships (2004, 2006, 2008, 2016). His greatest success at the international level is his fourth place at both the 2004 Olympic Games in Athens and 2012 Olympic Games in London. He captained the national team between 2004 and 2009, and at the 2016 European and the 2017 World Championship.

Although, having announced his retirement from the national squad on 9 October 2017, he represented Hungary two more times against Slovenia during the play-off of the European qualification for the 2019 World Men's Handball Championship as it was widely believed that the outcome of the play-off would significantly determine the forthcoming years of Hungarian men's handball. Despite being the underdog, Hungary managed to qualify and finished 10th at the tournament.

In 2005, he was picked for the World Selection team, that played against Spain in Madrid. Nagy was selected in the starting line-up and scored three goals in the match, which was won by Spain by 42 to 30. Nagy was also part of the team in 2017.

==== National team controversy ====
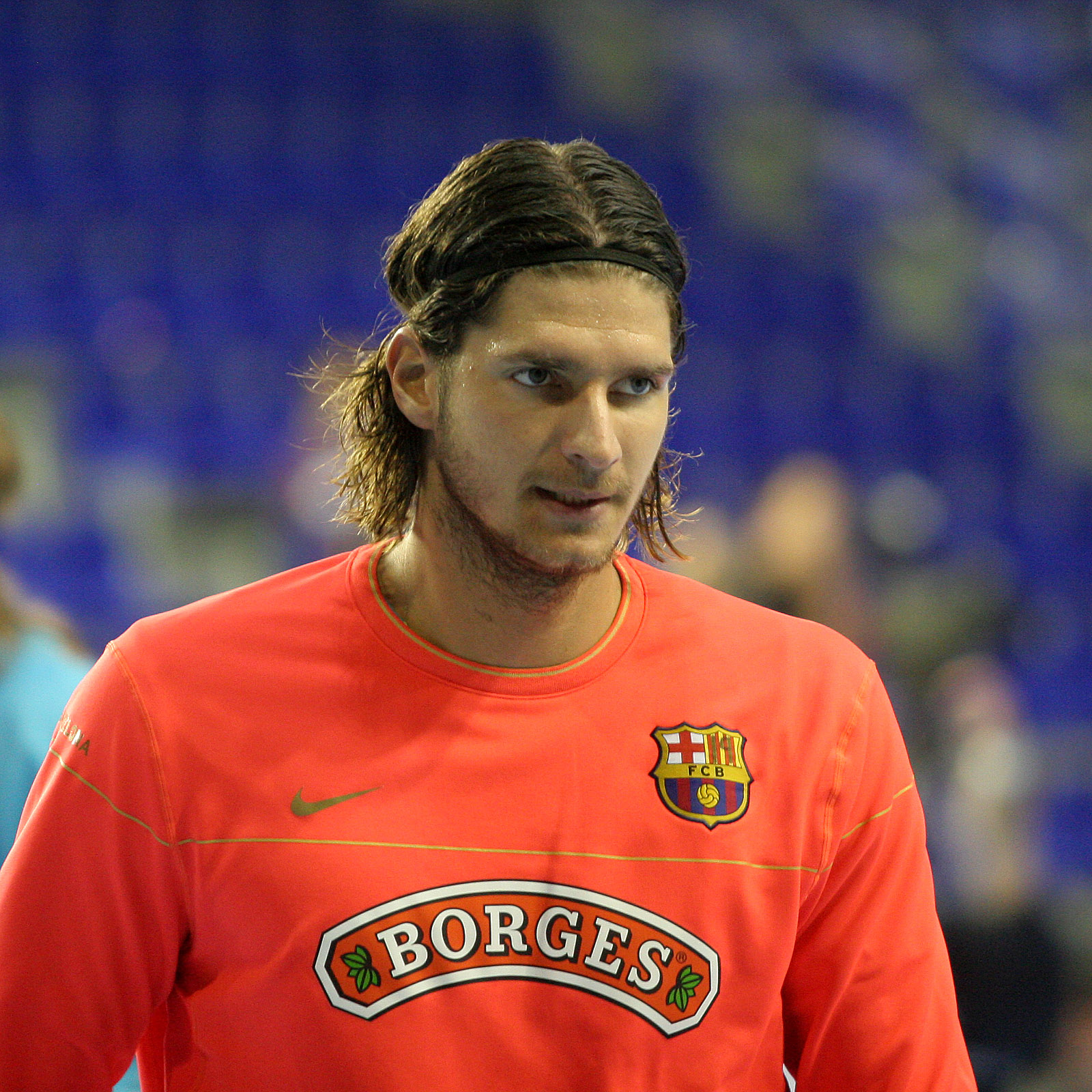
László Nagy in FC Barcelona Handbol

After 21 June 2009, Nagy refused to play for the Hungarian national team, claiming several reasons for this, which severely disappointed the fans. At the time it was rumoured that he might gain Spanish citizenship and represent Spain in later competitions, but Nagy refuted this allegation many times.

Finally, on 2 November 2010, he shared his thoughts and motives in an open letter. He explained that he found the conditions were far from ideal and the insurance issue also needed to be solved. He also said he had had talks with Hungarian Handball Federation chairman László Sinka, in late 2009, and was told that things were going to change. However, they did not, and Nagy stated that as long as the attitude stayed the same, he would not play for Hungary.

The talks continued after the 2011 World Championship and a final deadline was set on 15 February, for the sides to reach an agreement. Nagy did not wait until then but made it public on 10 February, that he had no desire to represent Hungary again.

In the summer of 2012, after the necessary three years without a single international appearance passed, Nagy became eligible to play for Spain. Subsequently, he was made an offer to take Spanish citizenship and participate at the coming Olympic Games. However, at the same time, Nagy received a contract offer from Hungarian powerhouse MKB Veszprém KC, which he accepted, claiming he planned his future in Hungary. Given the situation, Nagy eventually refused the Spanish citizenship and decided to play for Hungary. Nagy made his international return on 10 June 2012 in a 27–21 World Championship qualifier victory over Norway, contributing with six goals to the success. He then played for the Hungarian team at the 2012 Summer Olympics. The team finished in fourth position.

== Personal life ==
His brother, Levente Nagy is also a professional handball player; he plays for Hungarian First Division side Kecskeméti SE. He has also been selected, as goalkeeper, for the Hungarian national team.

He is married with a fitness model, Szilvia Sónyák.

His former wife, Erika, gave birth to his child, Debora, on 20 June 2007.

== Achievements ==
- Nemzeti Bajnokság I:
  - Winner: 2013, 2014, 2015, 2016, 2017, 2019
    - Bronze Medallist: 1998, 1999, 2000
- Magyar Kupa:
  - Winner: 2013, 2014, 2015, 2016, 2017, 2018
- SEHA League:
  - Winner: 2015, 2016
- Liga ASOBAL:
  - Winner: 2003, 2006, 2011, 2012
  - Silver Medallist: 2001, 2002, 2004, 2008, 2009, 2010
- Copa del Rey:
  - Winner: 2004, 2007, 2009, 2010
  - Silver Medallist: 2002, 2003, 2005, 2008, 2011
- Copa ASOBAL:
  - Winner: 2001, 2002, 2010, 2012
  - Silver Medallist: 2003, 2004, 2009, 2011
- Supercopa ASOBAL:
  - Winner: 2003, 2006, 2008, 2009
  - Silver Medallist: 2004, 2009, 2010, 2011
- EHF Champions League:
  - Winner: 2005, 2011
  - Finalist: 2001, 2010, 2015, 2016, 2019
  - Semi-finalist: 2008, 2014, 2017
- EHF Cup:
  - Winner: 2003
  - Finalist: 2002
- EHF Champions Trophy:
  - Winner: 2003
- Youth European Championship:
  - Winner: 1999
  - Bronze Medallist: 1997
- Junior European Championship:
  - Bronze Medallist: 1998

== Individual awards ==
- Hungarian Handballer of the Year: 2009, 2013, 2015, 2016
- Golden Cross of the Cross of Merit of the Republic of Hungary (2012)
- All-Star Team Right Back of the World Championship (2013)
- All-Star Right Back of the EHF Champions League: 2013
- Hungarian Best Defensive Player Of The Year: 2017
- EHF Hall of Fame in 2023.
