= Javier Rodríguez Moreno =

Spanish handball player (born 2002)

Personal information
- Nationality: Spanish
- Born: 22 July 2002 (age 24) Madrid, Spain
- Height: 2.00 m (6 ft 7 in)

Sport
- Sport: Handball
- Position: Pivot
- Current club: FC Barcelona
- Number: 99

Youth career
- Years: Team
- –: BM Base Villaverde

Senior clubs
- Years: Team
- 2018–2020: BM Granollers
- 2020–2021: BM Guadalajara
- 2021–2023: BM Logroño La Rioja
- 2023–2025: FC Barcelona
- 2025–: S.L. Benfica
National team
Years	Team	Apps	(Gls)
2021–	Spain	28	(43)
Medal record
Olympic Games
Bronze medal – third place	2024 Paris	Team
U-20 European Championship
Gold medal – first place	2022 Portugal
U-18 European Championship
Bronze medal – third place	2021 Croatia
- Updated on 3 November 2025

Javier Rodríguez Moreno (born 22 July 2002) is a Spanish handball player who plays for FC Barcelona and the Spanish national team.

== Club career ==
Rodriguez learned to play handball at BM Base Villaverde. He played for BM Alcobendas until 2020, in the Liga ASOBAL, the highest Spanish league, until they were relegated in the 2018/2019 season. Rodriguez then moved to the first division club Quabit BM Guadalajara, with whom he was relegated after the 2020/21 season. From 2021 to 2023 he played for BM Logroño La Rioja, also in the Liga Asobal. For the 2023/2024 season he moved to FC Barcelona. With Barcelona, he won the Spanish championship, the EHF Champions League, Copa ASOBAL, Iberian Supercup and the Copa del Rey in the 2023/2024 season.

== International career ==
Rodríguez played in the Spanish youth team, and in 2017 he was invited to the squad ("los Hispanos Promesas") for the first time. At the 2020 Mediterranean Games he won the gold medal with the Spanish youth team. He won the bronze medal with the U18/U19 team at the 2021 U-19 European Championship and was elected to the All-Star team.[9] Rodriguez played a total of 25 games for the youth team from 2019 to 2021, in which he scored 38 goals.

With the Spanish junior team, Rodríguez won the gold medal at the 2022 U-20 European Championship and was again elected to the All-Star team. For the junior team he played in 30 games from 2022 to 2023 and scored 71 goals.

In December 2021, Rodríguez was called up to the Spanish senior national team for the first time. He played his first game on 27 April 2023 in the EHF Euro Cup against Denmark.

== Honours ==
FC Barcelona

- EHF Champions League:
  - Winner: 2024
- Liga ASOBAL:
  - Winner: 2023–24
- Copa ASOBAL:
  - Winner: 2024
- Supercopa Ibérica:
  - Winner: 2023
