= Valero Rivera =

Valero Rivera may refer to:

- Valero Rivera López (born 1953), Spanish handballer and handball coach
- Valero Rivera Folch (born 1985), Spanish handballer, son of the previous
