= Cristian Ugalde =

Spanish handball player (born 1987)

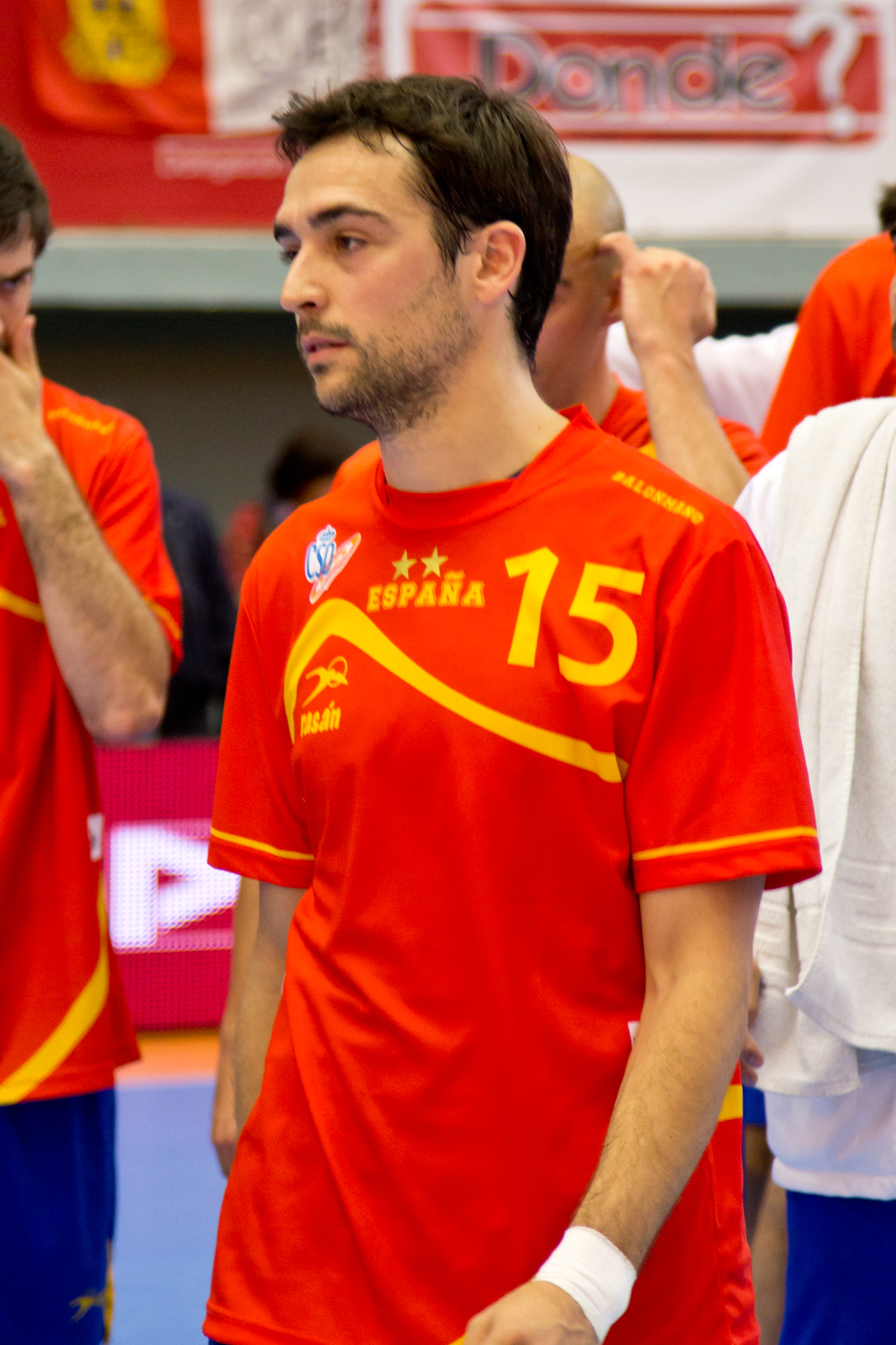
- Ugalde in 2013

Personal information
- Full name: Cristian Ugalde García
- Born: 19 October 1987 (age 39) Barcelona, Spain
- Height: 1.87 m (6 ft 2 in)

Sport
- Sport: Handball
- Position: Left wing
- Current club: Tatabánya KC (manager)

Senior clubs
- Years: Team
- 2004–2012: FC Barcelona
- 2012–2018: Telekom Veszprém
- 2018–2020: TSV Hannover-Burgdorf
- 2020–2022: AEK Athens
- 2022–2024: Tatabánya KC
National team
Years	Team	Apps	(Gls)
2007–2016	Spain	131	(288)

Teams managed
- 2024–: Tatabánya KC
Medal record
European Youth Olympic Festival
Gold medal – first place	2003 Paris
World Championship
Bronze medal – third place	2011 Sweden
European Championships
Silver medal – second place	2016 Poland
Bronze medal – third place	2014 Denmark

Cristian Ugalde García (born 19 October 1987) is a Spanish professional handball player for Tatabánya KC and the Spain national team.

== Career ==
He started his career in FC Barcelona's youth teams and he played his first match with FC Barcelona's Senior Team in the ASOBAL League 20 October 2004, just one day after being 17 years old. He played for FC Barcelona Senior team 7 years and won 18 titles. In 2012 he signed a contract with MKB Veszprem for the next 3 seasons, which in his second season as a player in the Hungarian club, has been prolonged for 3 more years until 2018. In 2020 he joined the Greek team AEK H.C.. In 2022 he joined Hungarian Tatabánya KC, where he played until his retirement in 2024. After his retirement he became the head coach of his former club Tatabánya KC.

Ugalde was called up for the first time to play for the senior Spain National Team 15 June 2007 and since then he has played 131 games and has scored 288 goals. He is a graduate in Sports Science for the Universidad Camilo José Cela in 2018.

== Honours ==
=== FC Barcelona ===
- 2x EHF Champions League: 2004–2005, 2010–2011
  - EHF Champions League finalist in 2010
- 3x Liga ASOBAL: 2005–2006, 2010–2011, 2011–2012
- 3x Supercopa ASOBAL: 2006–2007, 2008–2009, 2009–2010
- 6x Pirenees Leagues: 2005–2006, 2006–2007, 2007–2008, 2009–2010, 2010–2011, 2011–2012
- 3x King's Cup: 2006–2007, 2008–2009, 2009–2010
- 2x Copa ASOBAL: 2009–2010, 2011–2012

=== MKB Veszprém ===
- 2x Hungarian Supercup: 2014–2015, 2015-2016
- 6x Magyar Kupa (men's handball): 2012–2013, 2013–2014, 2014–2015, 2015–2016, 2016–2017, 2017–2018
- 5x Hungarian League Nemzeti Bajnokság I: 2012–2013, 2013–2014, 2014–2015, 2015–2016, 2016–2017
- 2x SEHA League winner: 2014–2015, 2015-2016
  - 1x SEHA League finalist: 2016–2017
- 2n place in EHF Champions League: 2014–2015, 2015–2016
- 3rd place in EHF Champions League: 2016–2017
- 4th place in EHF Champions League: 2013–2014
- 2n place IHF Super Globe: 2015–2016

=== TSV Hannover-Burgdorf ===
- 13th place in Handball-Bundesliga 2019
- 4th place in Handball-Bundesliga 2020
- 2x semifinalist in FINAL4 DHB-Pokal 2019 & 2020
- Quarter Finals in EHF Cup 2019

=== AEK Athens HC ===
- 1x EHF European Cup winner: 2020–2021
- 1x Handball Premier winner: 2020–2021
- 1x Greek Cup winner: 2020–2021

=== International ===
- Gold Medal European Youth Summer Olympic Festival U17 - Paris 2003
- 13th place in IHF World Men's Handball Championship - Croatia 2009
- 6th place in EHF European Men's Handball Championship - Austria 2010
- Bronze Medal IHF World Men's Handball Championship - Sweden 2011
- 4th place in EHF European Men's Handball Championship - Serbia 2012
- 7th place in Olympic Games - London 2012
- Bronze Medal EHF European Men's Handball Championship - Denmark 2014
- 4th place in IHF World Men's Handball Championship - Qatar 2015
- Silver Medal EHF European Men's Handball Championship - Poland 2016

=== Individual ===
- Top Scorer at Supercopa ASOBAL: 2009–2010
- Gold Medal of Royal Order of Sports Merit: 2013
- Silver Medal of Sports Merit in Handball for Royal Spanish Handball Federation 2014
- All Star Team of the Final4 of the SEHA League 2016.
- All Star Team of the Final4 of the EHF Champions League 2016.

== Private ==
His older brother Antonio Ugalde is also a handball player.
