= Supercopa ASOBAL =

- Founded: 1985
- Folded: 2022
- No. of teams: 2
- Country: Spain
- Confederation: EHF
- Last champion: FC Barcelona (2021)
- Most titles: FC Barcelona (24 titles)

The Supercopa ASOBAL or the Supercopa de España de Balonmano was an annual cup competition for Spanish handball teams. It was organised by the Liga ASOBAL. It was first played for in 1985 and was disputed between the Liga ASOBAL champions and the winners of the Copa del Rey de Balonmano. It was played as a single match, at a neutral venue and in different cities every year. In 2022 it was replaced by Supercopa Ibérica.

== Season by season ==
Season	Venue	Champion	Runners-up	Score	Coach champion
2021–2022	Torrelavega	FC Barcelona	ABANCA Ademar León	30–27	Antonio Carlos Ortega
2020–2021	Benidorm	FC Barcelona	BM Benidorm	38–18	Xavier Pascual
2019–2020	Cuenca	FC Barcelona Assistència Sanitària	Liberbank Cuenca	33–22	Xavier Pascual
2018–2019	Logroño	FC Barcelona Lassa	Logroño La Rioja	35–27	Xavier Pascual
2017–2018	Ciudad Real	FC Barcelona Lassa	Logroño La Rioja	31–25	Xavier Pascual
2016–2017	Pamplona	FC Barcelona Lassa	Helvetia Anaitasuna	38–30	Xavier Pascual
2015–2016	Zaragoza	FC Barcelona Lassa	Fraikin Granollers	26–23	Xavier Pascual
2014–2015	Tarragona	FC Barcelona	Fraikin Granollers	32–28	Xavier Pascual
2013–2014	Valladolid	FC Barcelona Intersport	Naturhouse La Rioja	40–31	Xavier Pascual
2012–2013	Madrid	FC Barcelona Intersport	Atlético Madrid	34–31	Xavier Pascual
2011–2012	Madrid	Atlético Madrid	Barcelona	33–26	Talant Dujshebaev
2010–2011	Córdoba	Renovalia Ciudad Real	Barcelona Borges	29–28	Talant Dujshebaev
2009–2010	Guadalajara	FC Barcelona Handbol	BM Ciudad Real	33–26	Xavier Pascual
2008–2009	Albacete	FC Barcelona Handbol	BM Ciudad Real	26–25	Manolo Cadenas
2007–2008	Salamanca	BM Ciudad Real	FC Barcelona Handbol	32–30	Talant Dujshebaev
2006–2007	Pontevedra	FC Barcelona Handbol	BM Valladolid	36–33	Xesco Espar
2005–2006	Málaga	Portland San Antonio	BM Valladolid	29–27	"Zupo" Equisoain
2004–2005	Lleida	BM Ciudad Real	FC Barcelona Handbol	32–29	Juan de Dios Román
2003–2004	Eibar	FC Barcelona Handbol	BM Ciudad Real	26–25	Valero Rivera
2002–2003	León	Portland San Antonio	CB Ademar León	33–27	"Zupo" Equisoain
2001–2002	Tudela	Portland San Antonio	CB Ademar León	26–24	"Zupo" Equisoain
2000–2001	Ibiza	FC Barcelona Handbol	BM Valladolid	34–32	Valero Rivera
1999–2000	Pilar de la Horadada	FC Barcelona Handbol	Portland San Antonio	27–23	Valero Rivera
1998–1999	Not Held				
1997–1998	Moguer	FC Barcelona Handbol	Caja Cantabria	30–28	Valero Rivera
1996–1997	Palencia	FC Barcelona Handbol	Elgorriaga Bidasoa	25–15	Valero Rivera
1995–1996	Santander	Elgorriaga Bidasoa	Caja Cantabria	29–28	Juantxo Villarreal
1994–1995	Granada	Teka Santander	FC Barcelona Handbol	29–28	Julián Ruiz
1993–1994	Zaragoza	FC Barcelona Handbol	Elgorriaga Bidasoa	30–22	Valero Rivera
1992–1993	Torrelavega	Teka Santander	CB Avidesa	Round-robin	Emilio Alonso
1991–1992	San Sebastián	FC Barcelona Handbol	CB Avidesa	29–21	Valero Rivera
1990–1991	Zaragoza	FC Barcelona Handbol	Teka Santander	22–18	Valero Rivera
1989-1990	Eibar	FC Barcelona Handbol	CD Cajamadrid	Round-robin	Valero Rivera
1988–1989	Alcañiz	FC Barcelona Handbol	Elgorriaga Bidasoa	29–21	Valero Rivera
1987–1988	Ibiza	Atlético Madrid	Elgorriaga Bidasoa	22–20	Juan de Dios Román
1986–1987	Burriana	FC Barcelona Handbol	Tecnisan	19–18	Valero Rivera
1985–1986	Alicante	Atlético Madrid	FC Barcelona Handbol	27–22	Jordi Alvaro

== Titles by team ==
Titles	Club
24 titles	FC Barcelona
3 titles	Atlético Madrid ^{(1)}
3 titles	BM Ciudad Real
3 titles	SDC San Antonio
2 titles	Teka Cantabria
1 titles	Elgorriaga Bidasoa

^{(1)} Includes titles from former and current Atlético Madrid

== Related competitions ==
- Liga ASOBAL
- Copa ASOBAL
- Copa del Rey de Balonmano
