= FC Barcelona Handbol =

Handball section of the FC Barcelona sports club

FC Barcelona
- Founded: 29 November 1942; 83 years ago
- Arena: Palau Blaugrana
- Capacity: 7,500
- President: Joan Laporta
- Head coach: Antonio Carlos Ortega
- League: Liga ASOBAL
- 2025–26: 1st
- Club colours
Home	Away

Futbol Club Barcelona Handbol is a professional Catalan Spanish handball team based in Barcelona, Catalonia. It is a part of the FC Barcelona multi sports club, and was founded on 29 November 1942. The club competes domestically in the Liga ASOBAL and in the European Champions League. It is the most successful handball club in Spain and Europe with a record number of domestic and international titles.

== History ==
=== Early years ===
The handball section of Futbol Club Barcelona was founded on 29 November 1942 during the presidency of Enrique Piñeyro. In the beginning handball was played with eleven players per team and did not have a specialized field to play. They used football fields until the late 1950s, when they started to play, as in actual games, with seven players and a covered field.

In the early stages, competitions were dominated by other teams like Atlético de Madrid and Granollers, breaking their domination few times.

They won their first league title and cup in 1969. Their homefield Palau Blaugrana was constructed in 1971, where they have played since.

=== Valero Rivera era (1983–2004) ===
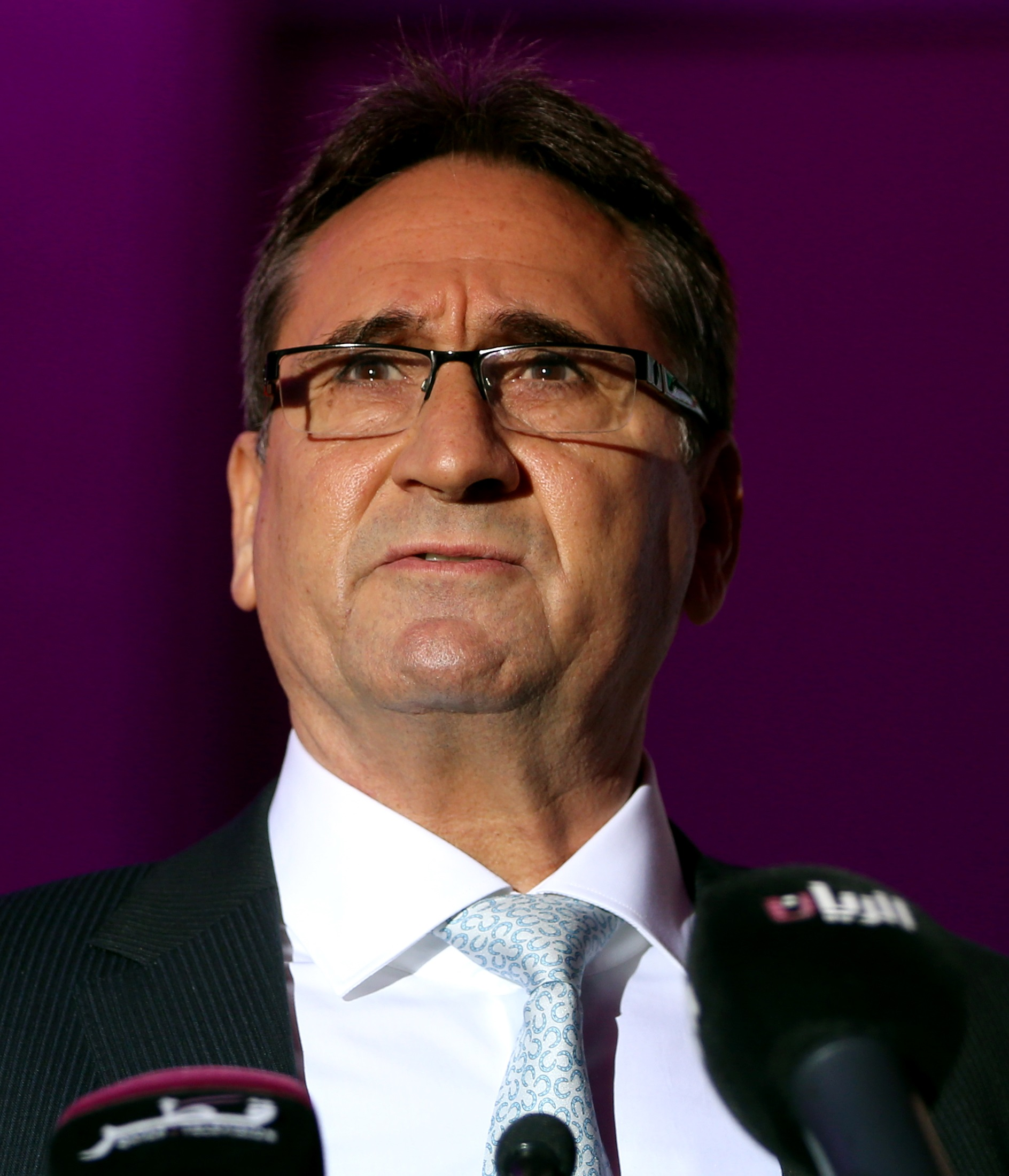
Valero Rivera López

Things changed radically with the arrival of one of the best coaches in handball history, Valero Rivera. With him, the team became virtually unbeatable in Spain and in Europe, winning a record of 70 trophies under his rule, including 5 consecutive, 6 in total, European Cups.

=== Post Valero Rivera era (2004–February 2009) ===
This period, dominated by rival Ciudad Real, was difficult for Barça, but the Catalans still managed to win the Liga once, and also a Champions League title in 2005 after 2 very close final matches against Ciudad Real.

=== Xavi Pascual era (February 2009 - June 2021) ===
The 2010s marked Barça's return to the top, a return notably illustrated by a participation in the 2009-10 EHF Champions League final (a first since 2005), beaten 34-36 by THW Kiel; and a 27-24 victory the following season beating rival BM Ciudad Real to win the European Cup/ EHF Champions League for the 8th time, first in Cologne.

In 2013, the Barça handball team won the IHF Super Globe trophy, the only trophy that was still missing from the club's trophy cabinet.

FC Barcelona’s handball team closed out the 2013/14 Liga ASOBAL with a record-breaking winning run. Barça made history this season when they completed their Liga ASOBAL without dropping any points from all 30 match days.

FC Barcelona successfully defended its IHF Super Globe title in 2014, marking the first time a team has won back-to-back titles since the most prestigious club handball event has been hosted annually in the Qatari capital Doha.

Again, FC Barcelona handball team ended the 2014/2015 Liga ASOBAL season unbeaten for the second consecutive year.

FC Barcelona handball team won the seven titles disputed the 2014/2015 season, something which had not happened since the 1999/2000 season with Valero Rivera's Dream Team.

In 2017 FC Barcelona handball was again champion of the IHF Super Globe after beating the German team Füchse Berlin.

In 2018, the club won the Super Globe trophy again, for the fourth time. In a repeat of last year the team of head coach Xavi Pascual won the IHF Super Globe Final against Füchse Berlin, this time by a five-goal difference, 29–24.

Again Barça won the IHF Super Globe in 2019, their third in a row. The team led by Xavi Pascual beat THW Kiel 34–32.

In 2021 Barça won the European title for the first time in six years, beating Aalborg Håndbold 36–23 in the final. They won all six competitions they entered that season and all 61 of their matches. It was the section's 10th Champions League title, won under Xavi Pascual, and Barça became the first team to lift the golden net, which replaced the bronze arm as the trophy for European champions from that season. The season also marked the end of a cycle, with the departure of several players, as well as David Barrufet, Xavi Pascual and Fernando Barbeito. Former Dream Team player Carlos Ortega was appointed as the new coach for the next three seasons.

=== Antonio Carlos Ortega era (July 2021 - present) ===
In the 2021–22 season, after the successes achieved the previous season, the azulgrana certified a new sextet, where the only title that escaped was the Super Globe in October. The team won the Spanish Super Cup, the Catalan Super Cup, the Copa del Rey, the Sacyr ASOBAL League, the Sacyr ASOBAL Cup, and finally the EHF Champions League. The team ended the season winning the 11th Champions League in Barça history. Barça revalidated the title in Cologne, being the first team to win two consecutive years with the new final four format, and extended its dominance in the historic record of the EHF Champions League.

The following seasons, from 2022/23 to 2025/26, the Blaugranas continued their domination in the local competitions by winning everything; recovering in October 2025, 6 years after their last coronation, the Super Globe trophy, 31-30 (ET) vs One Veszprém; and winning 2 EHF Champions League titles: in 2024 (31-30 vs Aalborg Håndbold) and in 2026 (37-34 vs Füchse Berlin).

Barça had an exceptional 2025-26 season, winning all 7 competitions played (Catalan Supercup, Iberian Supercup, Super Globe, Copa ASOBAL, Liga ASOBAL, Copa del Rey, EHF Champions League) with a record of 61 matches, 60 W, 1 L.

On September 5, 2026, Barça won the Iberian Supercup for the fifth consecutive time (in as many editions) after beating in the final the Portuguese champion Sporting CP, 39-34.

Due to the club's achievements during his era, notably marked by 3 EHF Champions League titles in 5 years, Barça management decided to extend Antonio Carlos Ortega's contract as Barça coach until June 30, 2031.

== Kits ==
HOME
2010-11	2011-12	2012-13	2013-14	2014-15	2015-16	2016-17	2017-18	2018-19	2019-20	2020-21	2021-22	2022-23

AWAY
2010-11	2011-12	2012-13	2013-14	2014-15	2015-16	2016-17	2017-18	2018-19	2019-20	2020-21	2021-

THIRD

2021-

== Honours ==
Type	Competition	Titles	Winning Seasons / Years
Worldwide	IHF Super Globe / Club World Championship	6	2013, 2014, 2017, 2018, 2019, 2025
European	European Cup / EHF Champions League	13	1990–91, 1995–96, 1996–97, 1997–98, 1998–99, 1999–2000, 2004–05, 2010–11, 2014–15, 2020–21, 2021–22, 2023–24, 2025–26
European	EHF Cup Winner's Cup	5	1983–84, 1984–85, 1985–86, 1993–94, 1994–95
European	EHF Cup	1	2002–03
European	European Super Cup	5	1996–97, 1997–98, 1998–99, 1999–00, 2003–04
Domestic	Liga ASOBAL	33	1968–69, 1972–73, 1979–80, 1981–82, 1985–86, 1987–88, 1988–89, 1989–90, 1990–91, 1991–92, 1995–96, 1996–97, 1997–98, 1998–99, 1999–2000, 2002–03, 2005–06, 2010–11, 2011–12, 2012–13, 2013–14, 2014–15, 2015–16, 2016–17, 2017–18, 2018–19, 2019–20, 2020–21, 2021–22, 2022–23, 2023–24, 2024–25, 2025–26
Domestic	Copa del Rey	30	1968–69, 1971–72, 1972–73, 1982–83, 1983–84, 1984–85, 1987–88, 1989–90, 1992–93, 1993–94, 1996–97, 1997–98, 1999–2000, 2003–04, 2006–07, 2008–09, 2009–10, 2013–14, 2014–15, 2015–16, 2016–17, 2017–18, 2018–19, 2019–20, 2020–21, 2021–22, 2022–23, 2023–24, 2024–25, 2025–26
Domestic	Copa ASOBAL	21	1994–95, 1995–96, 1999–00, 2000–01, 2001–02, 2009–10, 2011–12, 2012–13, 2013–14, 2014–15, 2015–16, 2016–17, 2017–18, 2018–19, 2019–20, 2020–21, 2021–22, 2022–23, 2023–24, 2024–25, 2025–26
Domestic	Supercopa ASOBAL	24	1986–87, 1988–89, 1989–90, 1990–91, 1991–92, 1993–94, 1996–97, 1997–98, 1999–00, 2000–01, 2003–04, 2006–07, 2008–09, 2009–10, 2012–13, 2013–14, 2014–15, 2015–16, 2016–17, 2017–18, 2018–19, 2019–20, 2020–21, 2021–22
Domestic	Supercopa Ibérica	5	2022, 2023, 2024, 2025, 2026
Domestic	Spanish Championship (11x11)	6	1944–45, 1945–46, 1946–47, 1948–49, 1950–51, 1956–57
Regional	Catalan Championship	10	1943–44, 1944–45, 1945–46, 1946–47, 1948–49, 1950–51, 1953–54, 1954–55, 1956–57, 1957–58
Regional	Catalan League	12	1981–82, 1982–83, 1983–84, 1984–85, 1986–87, 1987–88, 1990–91, 1991–92, 1992–93, 1993–94, 1994–95, 1996–97
Regional	Pyrenees League	12	1997–98, 1998–99, 1999–00, 2000–01, 2001–02, 2003–04, 2005–06, 2006–07, 2007–08, 2009–10, 2010–11, 2011–12
Regional	Catalan Super Cup	12	2012, 2014, 2015, 2016, 2017, 2018, 2019, 2020, 2021, 2022, 2023, 2024

- record

=== Major Achievements ===
- Double (League and Copa del Rey): 18 (1968–69, 1972–73, 1987–88, 1989–90, 1996–97, 1997–98, 1999–00, 2013–14, 2014–15, 2015–16, 2016–17, 2017–18, 2018–19, 2019–20, 2020–21, 2021–22, 2022–23, 2023–24)
- Triple Crown (League, Copa del Rey, and EHF Champions League): 8 (1996–97, 1997–98, 1999–00, 2014–15, 2020–21, 2021–22, 2023–24, 2025–26)

== Season by season ==
As of 2025–26 season.

From the 1980–81 season onwards.

List of seasons

Champs/Winners 2nd/Runners-up 3rd 4th/SF

Season	League		Copa del Rey	Copa ASOBAL / Copa de España	Supercopa ASOBAL / Supercopa Ibérica	European competitions		EHF Men's Champions Trophy	World club competition	Coaches	Top scorers in European competitions	Notes									
Season	1980–81	D1	Copa del Rey	Copa ASOBAL / Copa de España	Supercopa ASOBAL / Supercopa Ibérica	European competitions		EHF Men's Champions Trophy	World club competition	2nd	Runners-up	—N/a	—N/a	European Cup	QF	—N/a	—N/a	Sergi Petit	—N/a	—N/a	—N/a
1981–82	D1	Champs	—N/a	—N/a	—N/a	Cup Winner's Cups	QF	—N/a	—N/a	Sergi Petit	—N/a	—N/a									
1982–83	D1	2nd	Winners	—N/a	—N/a	Champions League	SF	—N/a	—N/a	Sergi Petit	—N/a	—N/a									
1983–84	D1	2nd	Winners	—N/a	—N/a	Cup Winners' Cup	Winners	—N/a	—N/a	Valero Rivera	—N/a	—N/a									
1984–85	D1	2nd	Winners	—N/a	—N/a	Cup Winners' Cup	Winners	—N/a	—N/a	Valero Rivera	—N/a	—N/a									
1985–86	D1	Champs	Runners-up	—N/a	Runners-up	Cup Winners' Cup	Winners	—N/a	—N/a	Valero Rivera	—N/a	—N/a									
1986–87	D1	2nd	—N/a	—N/a	Winners	European Cup	R16	—N/a	—N/a	Valero Rivera	—N/a	—N/a									
1987–88	D1	Champs	Winners	—N/a	—N/a	EHF Cup	SF	—N/a	—N/a	Valero Rivera	—N/a	—N/a									
1988–89	D1	Champs	Runners-up	—N/a	Winners	European Cup	QF	—N/a	—N/a	Valero Rivera	—N/a	—N/a									
1989–90	D1	Champs	Winners	—N/a	Winners	European Cup	Runners-up	—N/a	—N/a	Valero Rivera	—N/a	—N/a									
1990–91	D1	Champs	SF	SF	Winners	European Cup	Winners	—N/a	—N/a	Valero Rivera	—N/a	Barça has finally won the most prestigious European competition (C1).									
1991–92	D1	Champs	Runners-up	SF	Winners	European Cup	SF	—N/a	—N/a	Valero Rivera	—N/a	—N/a									
1992–93	D1	3rd	Winners	SF	Runners-up	European Cup	SF	—N/a	—N/a	Valero Rivera	—N/a	—N/a									
1993–94	D1	3rd	Winners	Runners-up	Winners	Cup Winners' Cup	Winners	—N/a	—N/a	Valero Rivera	—N/a	—N/a									
1994–95	D1	2nd	—N/a	Winners	Runners-up	Cup Winners' Cup	Winners	—N/a	—N/a	Valero Rivera	—N/a	—N/a									
1995–96	D1	Champs	Runners-up	Winners	Runners-up	Champions League	Winners	—N/a	—N/a	Valero Rivera	—N/a	—N/a									
1996–97	D1	Champs	Winners	SF	Winners	Champions League	Winners	Winners	—N/a	Valero Rivera	—N/a	—N/a									
1997–98	D1	Champs	Winners	SF	Winners	Champions League	Winners	Winners	—N/a	Valero Rivera	—N/a	—N/a									
1998–99	D1	Champs	Runners-up	Runners-up	—N/a	Champions League	Winners	Winners	—N/a	Valero Rivera	—N/a	—N/a									
1999–2000	D1	Champs	Winners	Winners	Winners	Champions League	Winners	Winners	—N/a	Valero Rivera	—N/a	Barça has won 7 straight European titles including a 5-peat in CL.									
2000–01	D1	2nd	SF	Winners	Winners	Champions League	Runners-up	Runners-up	—N/a	Valero Rivera	—N/a	End of the Golden era of Valero Rivera's Dream Team.									
2001–02	D1	2nd	QF	Winners	—N/a	EHF Cup	Runners-up	—N/a	—N/a	Valero Rivera	—N/a	—N/a									
2002–03	D1	Champs	Runners-up	Runners-up	—N/a	EHF Cup	Winners	—N/a	—N/a	Valero Rivera	—N/a	—N/a									
2003–04	D1	2nd	Winners	Runners-up	Winners	Champions League	R16	Winners	—N/a	Valero Rivera	(France) Jerome Fernandez, 44 goals	—N/a									
2004–05	D1	4th	Runners-up	SF	Runners-up	Champions League	Winners	—N/a	—N/a	Xesco Espar	(Spain) Iker Romero, 90 goals	First major title of the post Valero Rivera era.									
2005–06	D1	Champs	SF	—N/a	—N/a	Champions League	QF	3rd	—N/a	Xesco Espar	(Spain) Iker Romero, 47 goals	—N/a									
2006–07	D1	4th	Winners	SF	Winners	Champions League	QF	—N/a	—N/a	Xesco Espar	(Spain) Iker Romero, 56 goals	—N/a									
2007–08	D1	2nd	Runners-up	—N/a	Runners-up	Champions League	SF	—N/a	—N/a	Manolo Cadenas	(Spain) Iker Romero, 93 goals	Barça failed to win an official trophy for the 1st time since 1980-81.									
2008–09	D1	2nd	Winners	Runners-up	Winners	Champions League	Main Round	—N/a	—N/a	Manolo Cadenas - Xavi Pascual	(Denmark) Mikkel Hansen, 43 goals	—N/a									
2009–10	D1	2nd	Winners	Winners	Winners	Champions League	Runners-up	—N/a	—N/a	Xavi Pascual	(Spain) Juan Garcia Lorenzana, 97 goals	Barça's return to the EHFCL final 5 years later.									
2010–11	D1	Champs	SF	Runners-up	Runners-up	Champions League	Winners	—N/a	—N/a	Xavi Pascual	(Belarus) Siarhei Rutenka, 62 goals	Barça won the EHFCL again, 6 years after their last title.									
2011–12	D1	Champs	Runners-up	Winners	Runners-up	Champions League	QF	—N/a	—N/a	Xavi Pascual	(Hungary) Laszlo Nagy, 62 goals	—N/a									
2012–13	D1	Champs	SF	Winners	Winners	Champions League	Runners-up	—N/a	—N/a	Xavi Pascual	(Belarus) Siarhei Rutenka, 95 goals	Start of Barça's total hegemony in Spain.									
2013–14	D1	Champs	Winners	Winners	Winners	Champions League	3rd	—N/a	Winners	Xavi Pascual	(North Macedonia) Kiril Lazarov, 80 goals	—N/a									
2014–15	D1	Champs	Winners	Winners	Winners	Champions League	Winners	—N/a	Winners	Xavi Pascual	(North Macedonia) Kiril Lazarov, 106 goals	Barça repeated the feat of the 1999-00 by winning all competitions played.									
2015–16	D1	Champs	Winners	Winners	Winners	Champions League	QF	—N/a	3rd	Xavi Pascual	(North Macedonia) Kiril Lazarov, 109 goals	—N/a									
2016–17	D1	Champs	Winners	Winners	Winners	Champions League	4th	—N/a	—N/a	Xavi Pascual	(North Macedonia) Kiril Lazarov, 85 goals	Oct 29, 2016: 100th consecutive Liga ASOBAL victory.									
2017–18	D1	Champs	Winners	Winners	Winners	Champions League	R16	—N/a	Winners	Xavi Pascual	(France) Dika Mem, 73 goals	After 133 victories, the series ended on Dec 7, 2017 against Guadalajara; 26-26 draw.									
2018–19	D1	Champs	Winners	Winners	Winners	Champions League	3rd	—N/a	Winners	Xavi Pascual	(Spain) Aleix Gómez, 77 goals	Start of Barça's 2nd Golden era.									
2019–20	D1	Champs	Winners	Winners	Winners	Champions League	Runners-up	—N/a	Winners	Xavi Pascual	(Spain) Aleix Gómez, 74 goals	—N/a									
2020–21	D1	Champs	Winners	Winners	Winners	Champions League	Winners	—N/a	—N/a	Xavi Pascual	(France) Dika Mem, 93 goals	Unbeaten season with 100% wins.									
2021–22	D1	Champs	Winners	Winners	Winners	Champions League	Winners	—N/a	Runners-up	Antonio Carlos Ortega	(Spain) Aleix Gómez, 104 goals	Only team so far to win the EHFCL Final4 twice in a row.									
2022–23	D1	Champs	Winners	Winners	Winners	Champions League	3rd	—N/a	Runners-up	Antonio Carlos Ortega	(France) Dika Mem, 87 goals (63.5 efficiency)	—N/a									
2023–24	D1	Champs	Winners	Winners	Winners	Champions League	Winners	—N/a	3rd	Antonio Carlos Ortega	(France) Dika Mem, 106 goals (70.2 efficiency)	Ortega became only the 3rd coach to win multiple EHFCL Finals 4.									
2024–25	D1	Champs	Winners	Winners	Winners	Champions League	4th	—N/a	4th	Antonio Carlos Ortega	(France) Dika Mem, 76 goals (66.7 efficiency)	—N/a									
2025–26	D1	Champs	Winners	Winners	Winners	Champions League	Winners	—N/a	Winners	Antonio Carlos Ortega	(Spain) Aleix Gómez, 117 goals (80.7 efficiency)	61 games, 60 wins, 1 lost, 7 titles out of 7 possible.									
2026–27	D1				Winners	Champions League		—N/a	Runners-up	Antonio Carlos Ortega		—N/a									

== Season by season (B team) ==
Season	Tier	Division	Pos.	Notes
2001–02	3	1ª Nacional	10th	
2002–03	3	1ª Nacional	3rd	
2003–04	3	1ª Nacional	1st	
2004–05	3	1ª Nacional	2nd	
2005–06	3	1ª Nacional	1st	
2006–07	3	1ª Nacional	2nd	
2007–08	3	1ª Nacional	8th	
2008–09	3	1ª Nacional	1st / 1st / 2nd	
2009–10	3	1ª Nacional	1st / 1st / 1st	Promoted
2010–11	2	Plata	6th	
2011–12	2	Plata	1st	
2012–13	2	Plata	1st	
2013–14	2	Plata	1st	
2014–15	2	Plata	3rd	
2015–16	2	Plata	5th	

== European record ==
=== European Cup/ EHF Champions League, EHF Cup ===
Season	Round	Club	1st leg	2nd leg	Aggregate
2025–26 EHF Champions League; Winners	Group Matches (Group B)	(Denmark) GOG Håndbold	37–32	41–28	1st place
2025–26 EHF Champions League; Winners	Group Matches (Group B)	(Germany) SC Magdeburg	21–22	36–29	1st place
2025–26 EHF Champions League; Winners	Group Matches (Group B)	(Croatia) RK Zagreb	32–25	46–26	1st place
2025–26 EHF Champions League; Winners	Group Matches (Group B)	(Hungary) OTP Bank – Pick Szeged	31–28	35–27	1st place
2025–26 EHF Champions League; Winners	Group Matches (Group B)	(North Macedonia) RK Eurofarm Pelister	34–30	47–27	1st place
2025–26 EHF Champions League; Winners	Group Matches (Group B)	(Poland) Orlen Wisła Płock	34–24	30–24	1st place
2025–26 EHF Champions League; Winners	Group Matches (Group B)	(France) Paris Saint-Germain	30–27	38–33	1st place
2025–26 EHF Champions League; Winners	Quarterfinals	(France) HBC Nantes	32–30	31–21	63–51
2025–26 EHF Champions League; Winners	Semifinal	(Denmark) Aalborg Håndbold	37–32 (ET)		
2025–26 EHF Champions League; Winners	Final	(Germany) Füchse Berlin	37–34		
2023–24 EHF Champions League; Winners	Group Matches (Group B)	(France) Montpellier Handball	30–25	34–37	2nd place
2023–24 EHF Champions League; Winners	Group Matches (Group B)	(Germany) SC Magdeburg	32–20	28–29	2nd place
2023–24 EHF Champions League; Winners	Group Matches (Group B)	(Portugal) FC Porto	38–30	40–33	2nd place
2023–24 EHF Champions League; Winners	Group Matches (Group B)	(Denmark) GOG Håndbold	38–30	30–23	2nd place
2023–24 EHF Champions League; Winners	Group Matches (Group B)	(Slovenia) Celje Pivovarna Laško	37–31	39–30	2nd place
2023–24 EHF Champions League; Winners	Group Matches (Group B)	(Hungary) Telekom Veszprém	36–41	31–30	2nd place
2023–24 EHF Champions League; Winners	Group Matches (Group B)	(Poland) Orlen Wisła Płock	28–25	32–25	2nd place
2023–24 EHF Champions League; Winners	Quarterfinals	(France) Paris Saint-Germain	30–22	32–31	62–53
2023–24 EHF Champions League; Winners	Semifinal	(Germany) THW Kiel	30–18		
2023–24 EHF Champions League; Winners	Final	(Denmark) Aalborg Håndbold	31–30		
2021–22 EHF Champions League; Winners	Group Matches (Group B)	(Germany) SG Flensburg-Handewitt	25–21	29–22	2nd place
2021–22 EHF Champions League; Winners	Group Matches (Group B)	(Ukraine) Motor	36–25	10–0	2nd place
2021–22 EHF Champions League; Winners	Group Matches (Group B)	(Hungary) Telekom Veszprém	28–29	35–30	2nd place
2021–22 EHF Champions League; Winners	Group Matches (Group B)	(Romania) Dinamo București	36–32	35–30	2nd place
2021–22 EHF Champions League; Winners	Group Matches (Group B)	(France) Paris Saint-Germain	30–27	28–28	2nd place
2021–22 EHF Champions League; Winners	Group Matches (Group B)	(Portugal) FC Porto	33–33	38–31	2nd place
2021–22 EHF Champions League; Winners	Group Matches (Group B)	(Poland) Łomża Vive Kielce	30–32	27–29	2nd place
2021–22 EHF Champions League; Winners	Quarterfinals	(Germany) SG Flensburg-Handewitt	33–29	27–24	60–53
2021–22 EHF Champions League; Winners	Semifinal	(Germany) THW Kiel	34–30		
2021–22 EHF Champions League; Winners	Final	(Poland) Łomża Vive Kielce	37–35 (ET)		
2020–21 EHF Champions League; Winners	Group Matches (Group B)	(Ukraine) HC Motor Zaporizhzhia	42–24	30–25	1st place
2020–21 EHF Champions League; Winners	Group Matches (Group B)	(France) HBC Nantes	35-27	30-29	1st place
2020–21 EHF Champions League; Winners	Group Matches (Group B)	(Croatia) PPD Zagreb	45–27	37–33	1st place
2020–21 EHF Champions League; Winners	Group Matches (Group B)	(Denmark) Aalborg Håndbold	42–33	35–32	1st place
2020–21 EHF Champions League; Winners	Group Matches (Group B)	(Germany) THW Kiel	29–25	32–26	1st place
2020–21 EHF Champions League; Winners	Group Matches (Group B)	(Hungary) Telekom Veszprém	37–30	37–34	1st place
2020–21 EHF Champions League; Winners	Group Matches (Group B)	(Slovenia) RK Celje	42–28	32–29	1st place
2020–21 EHF Champions League; Winners	Last 16	(Norway) Elverum Håndball	39–19	37–25	76–44
2020–21 EHF Champions League; Winners	Quarterfinals	(Belarus) Meshkov Brest	40–28	33–29	73–57
2020–21 EHF Champions League; Winners	Semifinal	(France) HBC Nantes	31–26		
2020–21 EHF Champions League; Winners	Final	(Denmark) Aalborg Håndbold	36–23		
2019–20 EHF Champions League; Runners-up	Group Matches (Group A)	(France) Paris Saint-Germain	36–32	35–32	1st place
2019–20 EHF Champions League; Runners-up	Group Matches (Group A)	(Hungary) MOL-Pick Szeged	30–28	28–31	1st place
2019–20 EHF Champions League; Runners-up	Group Matches (Group A)	(Denmark) Aalborg	44–35	34–30	1st place
2019–20 EHF Champions League; Runners-up	Group Matches (Group A)	(Germany) Flensburg	31–27	34–27	1st place
2019–20 EHF Champions League; Runners-up	Group Matches (Group A)	(Slovenia) Celje	45–21	37–25	1st place
2019–20 EHF Champions League; Runners-up	Group Matches (Group A)	(Croatia) PPD Zagreb	32–23	36–19	1st place
2019–20 EHF Champions League; Runners-up	Group Matches (Group A)	(Norway) Elverum	33–24	30–26	1st place
2019–20 EHF Champions League; Runners-up	Quarterfinals		Cancelled		
2019–20 EHF Champions League; Runners-up	Semi-final (F4)	(France) Paris Saint-Germain	37–32		
2019–20 EHF Champions League; Runners-up	Final (F4)	(Germany) THW Kiel	28–33		
2014-15 EHF Champions League; Winners	Group Matches (Group B)	(Sweden) Alingsas HK	38–28	42-29	1st place
2014-15 EHF Champions League; Winners	Group Matches (Group B)	(Poland) Wisla Plock	30–25	31-34	1st place
2014-15 EHF Champions League; Winners	Group Matches (Group B)	(Turkey) Beşiktaş	35-25	29-25	1st place
2014-15 EHF Champions League; Winners	Group Matches (Group B)	(Denmark) KIF Kolding	27–27	33-27	1st place
2014-15 EHF Champions League; Winners	Group Matches (Group B)	(Germany) SG Flensburg-Handewitt	37-33	36-27	1st place
2014-15 EHF Champions League; Winners	Last 16	(Denmark) Aalborg Handbold	31-11	29-22	60-33
2014-15 EHF Champions League; Winners	Quarterfinals	(Croatia) RK Zagreb	25-23	43-21	68-44
2014-15 EHF Champions League; Winners	Semifinal	(Poland) KS Iskra Kielce	33-28		
2014-15 EHF Champions League; Winners	Final	(Hungary) Telekom Veszprém	28-23		
2012-13 EHF Champions League; Runners-up	Group Matches (Group D)	(Switzerland) Kadetten Schaffhausen	33-23	36-25	1st place
2012-13 EHF Champions League; Runners-up	Group Matches (Group D)	(Germany) Füchse Berlin	34-23	30-31	1st place
2012-13 EHF Champions League; Runners-up	Group Matches (Group D)	(Belarus) Dinamo-Minsk	25-24	30-28	1st place
2012-13 EHF Champions League; Runners-up	Group Matches (Group D)	(Croatia) Zagreb	32-21	35-25	1st place
2012-13 EHF Champions League; Runners-up	Group Matches (Group D)	(Hungary) Pick Szeged	33-28	33-24	1st place
2012-13 EHF Champions League; Runners-up	Last 16	(Denmark) Bjerringbro-Silkeborg	32-26	26-24	58-50
2012-13 EHF Champions League; Runners-up	Quarterfinals	(Spain) Atlético Madrid	20-25	32-24	52-49
2012-13 EHF Champions League; Runners-up	Semifinal	(Poland) Vive Targi Kielce	28-23		
2012-13 EHF Champions League; Runners-up	Final	(Germany) HSV Hamburg	29-30 (ET)		
2010-11 EHF Champions League; Winners	Group Matches (Group A)	(Germany) Rhein-Neckar Lowen	30-31	38-38	3rd place
2010-11 EHF Champions League; Winners	Group Matches (Group A)	(Germany) THW Kiel	28-28	32-29	3rd place
2010-11 EHF Champions League; Winners	Group Matches (Group A)	(Slovenia) Celje Laško	44-33	30-27	3rd place
2010-11 EHF Champions League; Winners	Group Matches (Group A)	(France) Chambéry Savoie	26-27	38-23	3rd place
2010-11 EHF Champions League; Winners	Group Matches (Group A)	(Poland) Vive Kielce	33-26	28-28	3rd place
2010-11 EHF Champions League; Winners	Last 16	(Hungary) Telekom Veszprém	28-21	26-30	54-51
2010-11 EHF Champions League; Winners	Quarterfinals	(Germany) THW Kiel	27-25	36-33	63-58
2010-11 EHF Champions League; Winners	Semifinal	(Germany) Rhein-Neckar Lowen	30-28		
2010-11 EHF Champions League; Winners	Final	(Spain) BM Ciudad Real	27-24		
2009-10 EHF Champions League; Runners-up	Group Matches (Group D)	(Switzerland) ZMC Amicitia Zürich	39-27	37-26	2nd place
2009-10 EHF Champions League; Runners-up	Group Matches (Group D)	(Germany) THW Kiel	27-30	32-30	2nd place
2009-10 EHF Champions League; Runners-up	Group Matches (Group D)	(Denmark) KIF Kolding	46-36	25-25	2nd place
2009-10 EHF Champions League; Runners-up	Group Matches (Group D)	(Spain) Ademar León	28-22	37-27	2nd place
2009-10 EHF Champions League; Runners-up	Group Matches (Group D)	(North Macedonia) HC Vardar Skopje	35-28	35-28	2nd place
2009-10 EHF Champions League; Runners-up	Last 16	HC Croatia Zagreb	33-26	36-33	69-59
2009-10 EHF Champions League; Runners-up	Quarterfinals	(Hungary) Veszprém KC	33-27	34-33	67-60
2009-10 EHF Champions League; Runners-up	Semifinal	(Russia) Chekhovskiye Medvedi	34-27		
2009-10 EHF Champions League; Runners-up	Final	(Germany) THW Kiel	34-36		
2004-05 EHF Champions League; Winners	Group Matches (Group A)	(Romania) HCM Constanta	27-29	32-25	2nd place
2004-05 EHF Champions League; Winners	Group Matches (Group A)	(North Macedonia) RK Vardar	31-22	26-12	2nd place
2004-05 EHF Champions League; Winners	Group Matches (Group A)	(Hungary) SC Pick Szeged	21-22	35-26	2nd place
2004-05 EHF Champions League; Winners	Last 16	(Spain) Portland San Antonio	28-22	24-30	52*-52
2004-05 EHF Champions League; Winners	Quarterfinals	(Germany) THW Kiel	25-30	33-27	58-57
2004-05 EHF Champions League; Winners	Semifinals	(Slovenia) Celje Laško	31-34	31-26	62-60
2004-05 EHF Champions League; Winners	Finals	(Spain) BM Ciudad Real	27-28	29-27	56-55
2002-03 EHF Cup; Winners	Last 32	(Bosnia and Herzegovina) RK Izviđač	31-27	39-19	70-46
2002-03 EHF Cup; Winners	Last 16	(Germany) TUSEM Essen	36-26	28-32	64-58
2002-03 EHF Cup; Winners	Quarterfinals	(Lithuania) Granitas-Karys	33-25	34-25	67-50
2002-03 EHF Cup; Winners	Semifinals	(Spain) BM Altea	29-20	30-22	59-42
2002-03 EHF Cup; Winners	Finals	(Russia) Dinamo Astrakhan	35-23	33-26	68-49
2001-02 EHF Cup; Runners-up	Last 32	(Iceland) Haukar Hafnarfjörður	39-29	30-28	69-57
2001-02 EHF Cup; Runners-up	Last 16	(Switzerland) TSV St. Otmar Saint-Gall Handball	31-23	41-28	72-51
2001-02 EHF Cup; Runners-up	Quarterfinals	(Norway) Drammen HK	39-30	27-24	66-54
2001-02 EHF Cup; Runners-up	Semifinals	(Spain) BM Gáldar	41-23	33-32	74-55
2001-02 EHF Cup; Runners-up	Finals	(Germany) THW Kiel	29-36	28-24	57-60
2000-01 EHF Champions League; Runners-up	Group Matches (Group B)	(France) Montpellier HB	25-25	24-17	1st place
2000-01 EHF Champions League; Runners-up	Group Matches (Group B)	(Poland) Wybrzeże Gdańsk	31-22	23-21	1st place
2000-01 EHF Champions League; Runners-up	Group Matches (Group B)	(Hungary) Dunaferr SE	22-22	30-26	1st place
2000-01 EHF Champions League; Runners-up	Quarterfinals	(Croatia) Badel 1862 Zagreb	29-17	26-23	55-40
2000-01 EHF Champions League; Runners-up	Semifinals	(Germany) THW Kiel	24-28	33-28	57-56
2000-01 EHF Champions League; Runners-up	Finals	(Spain) SDC San Antonio	24-30	25-22	49-52
1999-2000 EHF Champions League; Winners	Last 32	(Bulgaria) HC Port Kaunas	40-13	48-14	88-27
1999-2000 EHF Champions League; Winners	Group Matches (Group D)	(Russia) HC Kaustik Volgograd	30-24	31-20	1st place
1999-2000 EHF Champions League; Winners	Group Matches (Group D)	(Federal Republic of Yugoslavia) Partizan Beograd	32-19	34-22	1st place
1999-2000 EHF Champions League; Winners	Group Matches (Group D)	(Hungary) Fotex KC Veszprém	31-23	25-21	1st place
1999-2000 EHF Champions League; Winners	Quarterfinals	(Ukraine) ZTR Zaporozhye	23-17	26-21	49-38
1999-2000 EHF Champions League; Winners	Semifinals	(Slovenia) Celje Pivovarna Lasko	39-25	20-27	59-52
1999-2000 EHF Champions League; Winners	Finals	(Germany) THW Kiel	25-28	29-24	54-52
1998-99 EHF Champions League; Winners	Last 32	(Georgia (country)) Shevardeni G.T.U. Tbilisi	44-15	30-16	74-31
1998-99 EHF Champions League; Winners	Group Matches (Group B)	(Belarus) SKA Minsk	30-17	39-26	1st place
1998-99 EHF Champions League; Winners	Group Matches (Group B)	(Ukraine) ZTR Zaporozhye	30-22	29-20	1st place
1998-99 EHF Champions League; Winners	Group Matches (Group B)	(Switzerland) Pfadi Winterthur	25-25	33-25	1st place
1998-99 EHF Champions League; Winners	Quarterfinals	(Hungary) Fotex KC Veszprém	29-29	29-24	58-53
1998-99 EHF Champions League; Winners	Semifinals	(Slovenia) Celje Pivovarna Lasko	32-35	30-26	62-61
1998-99 EHF Champions League; Winners	Finals	(Croatia) Badel 1862 Zagreb	22-22	29-18	51-40
1997-98 EHF Champions League; Winners	Last 32	(Turkey) Cankaya Bel. Ankara	34-12	37-30	71-42
1997-98 EHF Champions League; Winners	Group Matches (Group C)	(Portugal) ABC Braga	21-21	32-18	1st place
1997-98 EHF Champions League; Winners	Group Matches (Group C)	(Israel) Hapoel Rishon Le Zion	42-17	29-28	1st place
1997-98 EHF Champions League; Winners	Group Matches (Group C)	(Denmark) Virum-Sorgenfri HK	25-21	30-23	1st place
1997-98 EHF Champions League; Winners	Quarterfinals	(Hungary) Fotex KC Veszprém	28-33	32-27	60*-60
1997-98 EHF Champions League; Winners	Semifinals	(Germany) TBV Lemgo	31-22	32-34	63-56
1997-98 EHF Champions League; Winners	Finals	(Croatia) Badel 1862 Zagreb	28-18	28-22	56-40
1996-97 EHF Champions League; Winners	Last 32	(Russia) HC Kaustik Volgograd	37-22	34-29	71-51
1996-97 EHF Champions League; Winners	Group Matches (Group A)	(Ukraine) Shakhtar Donetsk	26-23	36-18	1st place
1996-97 EHF Champions League; Winners	Group Matches (Group A)	(Lithuania) Granitas Kaunas	38-17	23-23	1st place
1996-97 EHF Champions League; Winners	Group Matches (Group A)	(Portugal) ABC Braga	23-20	34-26	1st place
1996-97 EHF Champions League; Winners	Quarterfinals	(Hungary) SC Pick Szeged	26-25	40-17	66-42
1996-97 EHF Champions League; Winners	Semifinals	(Slovenia) Celje Pivovarna Lasko	29-24	22-26	51-50
1996-97 EHF Champions League; Winners	Finals	(Croatia) Badel 1862 Zagreb	31-22	30-23	61-45
1995-96 EHF Champions League; Winners	Last 32	(Georgia (country)) GTU Tbilisi	40-19	30-20	70-39
1995-96 EHF Champions League; Winners	Last 16	(Austria) ASKÖ Linde Linz	27-30	35-17	62-47
1995-96 EHF Champions League; Winners	Group Matches (Group B)	(Switzerland) Pfadi Winterthur	26-29	35-24	1st place
1995-96 EHF Champions League; Winners	Group Matches (Group B)	(Denmark) GOG Gudme	35-23	22-22	1st place
1995-96 EHF Champions League; Winners	Group Matches (Group B)	(Croatia) Badel 1862 Zagreb	26-16	23-21	1st place
1995-96 EHF Champions League; Winners	Finals	(Spain) Elgorriaga Bidasoa	23-15	23-23	46-38
1990-91 European Cup; Winners	Round 2	(Netherlands) HV Sittardia	43-18	33-17	76-35
1990-91 European Cup; Winners	Quarterfinals	(France) USAM Nîmes	23-16	18-16	41-32
1990-91 European Cup; Winners	Semifinals	(Turkey) ETİ Bisküvi Eskişehir	31-19	40-16	71-35
1990-91 European Cup; Winners	Finals	(Socialist Federal Republic of Yugoslavia) Proleter Zrenjanin	21-23	20-17	41-40
1989-90 European Cup; Runners-up	Round 1	(Portugal) Benfica Lisboa	28-17	18-20	46-37
1989-90 European Cup; Runners-up	Round 2	(Bulgaria) CSKA Sofia	26-16	36-21	62-37
1989-90 European Cup; Runners-up	Quarterfinals	(Sweden) Redbergslids IK	16-22	28-19	44-41
1989-90 European Cup; Runners-up	Semifinals	(France) US Créteil	23-18	20-19	43-37
1989-90 European Cup; Runners-up	Finals	(Soviet Union) SKA Minsk	21-26	29-27	50-53

== Team ==
=== Staff ===
Staff for the 2026–27 season

- General Manager (Spain) Xavier O'Callaghan
- Head coach (Spain) Antonio Carlos Ortega
- Assistant coach (Russia) Konstantin Igropulo
- Assistant coach (Spain) Jordi Rosell
- Goalkeeping coach (Sweden) Tomas Svensson
- Physiotherapist (Spain) Sebastià Salas
- Club doctor (Spain) Josep A. Gutiérrez

=== Current squad ===
Squad for the 2026–2027 season

Goalkeepers

- 1 (Iceland) Viktor Gísli Hallgrímsson
- 25 (Spain) Sergey Hernández

Left Wingers

- 6 (Spain) Daniel Fernández
- 83 (Spain) Ian Barrufet

Right Wingers

- 18 (Slovenia) Blaž Janc
- 20 (Spain) Aleix Gómez
- 23 (Spain) Adrián Sola

Line players

- 27 (Spain) Òscar Grau
- 72 (France) Ludovic Fabregas
- 82 (Portugal) Luís Frade

Left Backs

- 9 (Sweden) Jonathan Carlsbogård
- 19 (France) Timothey N'Guessan (c)
- 70 (Spain) Oriol San Felipe

Central Backs

- 3 (Iceland) Janus Daði Smárason
- 45 (Egypt) Seif El-Deraa
- 88 (Spain) Petar Cikusa

Right Backs

- 10 (France) Dika Mem
- 11 (Spain) Djordje Cikusa

=== Transfers ===
Transfers for the 2026–27 season

Joining

- (Iceland) Janus Daði Smárason (CB) from (Hungary) OTP Bank-Pick Szeged
- (Spain) Sergey Hernández (GK) from (Germany) SC Magdeburg
- (Austria) Sergej Novakovic (GK) from (Austria) Handballclub Fivers Margareten

Leaving

- (Denmark) Emil Nielsen (GK) to (Hungary) ONE Veszprém
- (Slovenia) Domen Makuc (CB) to (Germany) THW Kiel
- (Bosnia and Herzegovina) (Spain) Filip Šarić (GK) to (Spain) BM Villa de Aranda
- (Brazil) Mikael Lopes Cândido (RB) to (Spain) Balonmano Torrelavega
- (Spain) Antonio Bazán (LP) to (Spain) Helvetia Anaitasuna
- (Spain) Álex Ugalde (LW) to (Spain) CB Nava
- (Spain) Jan Blas (RW) to (Spain) BM Rebi Cuenca
- (Spain) Miguel Ángel Martín (RB) on loan at (Spain) CD Bidasoa

=== Transfers ===
Transfers for the 2027–28 season

Joining

Leaving

- (France) Dika Mem (RB) (to (Germany) Füchse Berlin)

=== Transfer History ===
Transfers for the 2025–26 season

Joining

- (France) Ludovic Fabregas (LP) from (Hungary) ONE Veszprém
- (Iceland) Viktor Gísli Hallgrímsson (GK) from (Poland) Wisła Płock
- (Egypt) Seif El-Deraa (CB) from (France) Limoges Handball
- (Spain) Daniel Fernández (LW) from (Germany) TVB Stuttgart
- (Spain) Ian Barrufet (LW) back from loan at (Germany) MT Melsungen
- (Spain) Djordje Cikusa (RB) back from loan at (France) Montpellier Handball

Leaving

- (France) Vincent Gérard (GK) (retires)
- (France) Melvyn Richardson (RB) to (Poland) Wisła Płock
- (Sweden) Hampus Wanne (LW) to (Denmark) HØJ Elite
- (Brazil) Thiagus dos Santos (LB) to (Hungary) ONE Veszprém
- (Spain) Gonzalo Pérez de Vargas (GK) to (Germany) THW Kiel
- (Spain) Aitor Ariño (LW) to (Germany) Füchse Berlin
- (Spain) Pol Valera (CB) to (Portugal) FC Porto
- (Spain) Javier Rodríguez Moreno (LP) to (Portugal) S.L. Benfica
- (Spain) Juan Palomino (LB) to (Spain) BM Granollers
- (Spain) Josep Ernèst Armengol Garín (LP) to (Spain) BM Granollers

== Stats, Records (Players/Team/Coaches) ==
I) Players records:

Barça all-time goalscorers in Spanish League:

- (Spain) Enric Masip, 1,682 goals (14 seasons), RECORD
- (Hungary) László Nagy, 1.297 goals (12 seasons)
- (Spain) Víctor Tomás, 1,289 goals (19 seasons)
- (Spain) Iker Romero, 1,093 goals (8 seasons)
- (Spain) Juanín García, 1,019 goals (9 seasons)
- (France) Dika Mem, 1014 goals (10 seasons)
- (Spain) Xavier O'Callaghan, 1,007 goals (15 seasons)
- (Spain) Antonio Carlos Ortega, 939 goals (11 seasons)
- (Spain) Aitor Ariño, 917 goals (16 seasons)
- (Spain) Aleix Gómez, 863 goals (12 seasons)

Note: Last updated (November 22, 2026).

Barça all-time historic matches (most appearances) in Spanish League

- (Spain) David Barrufet, 530 matches (20 seasons), RECORD
- (Spain) Víctor Tomás, 395 matches (19 seasons)
- (Spain) Xavier O'Callaghan, 380 matches (15 seasons)
- (Ukraine) (Spain) Andrei Xepkin, 336 matches (13 seasons)
- (Spain) Enric Masip, 332 matches (14 seasons)
- (Spain) Aitor Ariño, 327 matches (13 seasons)
- (Hungary) László Nagy, 326 matches (12 seasons)
- (Spain) Gonzalo Pérez de Vargas, 317 matches (14 seasons)
- (France) Cédric Sorhaindo, 284 matches (11 seasons)
- (Spain) Antonio Carlos Ortega, 274 matches (11 seasons)

Note: Last updated (November 22, 2026).

Barça's top 3 goalscorers in EHF Champions League Final 4:

- (Spain) Aleix Gómez, 102 goals (8 appearances), RECORD
- (France) Dika Mem, 78 goals (9 appearances)
- (France) Timothey N'Guessan, 67 goals (9 appearances)

Player to reach +100 goals in EHF Champions League Final 4:

- (Spain) Aleix Gómez (First ever player), 102 goals, RECORD

Barça all-time top goalscorers in European Cup/EHF Champions League:

- (France) Dika Mem, 785 goals (11 seasons), RECORD
- (Spain) Víctor Tomás, 723 goals (17 seasons)
- (Spain) Aleix Gómez, 718 goals (10 seasons)
- (France) Timothey N'Guessan, 521 goals (11 seasons)
- (Spain) Iker Romero, 464 goals (8 seasons)

Note: Last updated (November 22, 2026), after the first day of the 2026-27 EHF Champions League Main Round.

II) Most successful player in Barça history:

- (Spain) David Barrufet, with 71 trophies: 1 European Champions Cup, 6 EHF Champions League, 2 EHF Cup Winners' Cup, 5 European Supercup, 1 EHF Cup, 13 Spanish Supercup, 10 Pirenees league, 6 League Cup, 6 Catalan League, 11 Liga, 10 Spanish Cup, RECORD

Barça most successful players in European Cup/ EHF Champions League: With 7 titles:

- (Spain) David Barrufet, (1991, 1996, 1997, 1998, 1999, 2000, 2005)
- (Spain) Xavier O'Callaghan, (1991, 1996, 1997, 1998, 1999, 2000, 2005)

With 6 titles:

- (Ukraine) (Spain) Andrei Xepkin, (1996, 1997, 1998, 1999, 2000, 2005)
- (Spain) Enric Masip, (1991, 1996, 1997, 1998, 1999, 2000)
- (Spain) Iñaki Urdangarin, (1991, 1996, 1997, 1998, 1999, 2000)
- (Spain) Antonio Carlos Ortega, (1996, 1997, 1998, 1999, 2000, 2005)

With 5 titles:

- (Sweden) Tomas Svensson, (1996, 1997, 1998, 1999, 2000)
- (Spain) Rafael Guijosa, (1996, 1997, 1998, 1999, 2000)
- (Spain) Gonzalo Pérez de Vargas, (2011, 2015, 2021, 2022, 2024)
- (Spain) Aitor Ariño, (2011, 2015, 2021, 2022, 2024)

With 4 titles:

- (Spain) Mateo Garralda, (1996, 1997, 1998, 1999)
- (Spain) Fernando Barbeito, (1991, 1996, 1997, 1998)
- (Spain) Aleix Gómez, (2021, 2022, 2024, 2026)
- (France) Dika Mem, (2021, 2022, 2024, 2026)
- (France) Timothey N'Guessan, (2021, 2022, 2024, 2026)
- (Portugal) Luís Frade, (2021, 2022, 2024, 2026)
- (Slovenia) Blaž Janc, (2021, 2022, 2024, 2026)
- (Slovenia) Domen Makuc, (2021, 2022, 2024, 2026)

In italic, active Barcelona player.

III) TEAM: General performances

- Most final appearances (European Cup/EHFCL combined):

18 (1990, 1991, 1996 to 2001, 2005, 2010, 2011, 2013, 2015, 2020 to 2022, 2024, 2026), RECORD

- Most final appearances in EHF Champions League:

16 (1996 to 2001, 2005, 2010, 2011, 2013, 2015, 2020 to 2022, 2024, 2026), RECORD

- Most final appearances (EHFCL Final4 era):

8 (2010, 2011, 2013, 2015, 2020 to 2022, 2024, 2026), RECORD

- Most titles won (EHFCL Final4 era):

6 (2011, 2015, 2021, 2022, 2024, 2026), RECORD

- Most Semifinals appearances in EHF Champions League:

22 (1996* to 2001, 2005, 2008, 2010, 2011, 2013 to 2015, 2017, 2019 to 2026), RECORD

- Biggest gap in the history of the EHF Champions League FINAL4 finals:

13 goals (2020-21 season, 36-23 vs. Aalborg Håndbold), RECORD

- First and only team to score +500 goals in a European Cup/ EHF Champions League group stage:

505 goals (2020-21 season), RECORD

- Most goals scored in a European Cup/ EHF Champions League group stage:

505 goals (2020-21 season), RECORD

- First and only team to finish a European Cup/ EHF Champions League group stage with a +100 goal difference:

+110 (2025-26 season), RECORD

- Most wins in a European Cup/ EHF Champions League group stage:

14 wins (2020-21 season), RECORD; 13 wins (2019-20, 2022-23, 2025-26)

- Clubs to win the strongest club competition in Europe (EHF Champions League) in at least 4 different decades:

Barcelona, 4 decades (1991, 1996, 1997, 1998, 1999, 2000, 2005, 2011, 2015, 2021, 2022, 2024, 2026), SHARED RECORD

- Longest win streak in EHF Champions League history:

Barcelona, 23 wins (September 25, 2025 - ongoing), RECORD

- Longest unbeaten run in EHF Champions League history:

Barcelona, 23 wins (September 25, 2025 - ongoing), RECORD

IV) TEAM: Consecutive appearances

- Most consecutive final appearances (EHF Champions League era):

6 (1996, 1997, 1998, 1999, 2000, 2001), RECORD

- Most consecutive final appearances (EHFCL Final4 era):

3 (2020, 2021, 2022), RECORD

- Most consecutive EHFCL Final4 appearances:

8 (2018-19 to 2025-26), RECORD

V) TEAM: Consecutive titles

- Most consecutive titles (EHF Champions League era):

5 (1996, 1997, 1998, 1999, 2000), RECORD

- Most consecutive titles (EHFCL Final4 era):

2 (2021, 2022), RECORD

- Most consecutive titles in Liga ASOBAL:

16 (2010-11 to 2025-26), RECORD

- Most consecutive titles in Copa del Rey:

13 (2013-14 to 2025-26), RECORD

- Most consecutive titles in Copa ASOBAL:

15 (2011-12 to 2025-26), RECORD

- Most consecutive titles in Supercopa ASOBAL:

10 (2012-13 to 2021-22), RECORD

- Most consecutive titles in Supercopa Iberica:

5 (2022, 2023, 2024, 2025, 2026), RECORD

- Most consecutive titles in IHF Men's Club World Championship:

3 (2017, 2018, 2019), JOINT RECORD

- Most consecutive titles in EHF Cup Winners' Cup:

3 (1984, 1985, 1986), RECORD

- Most consecutive titles in EHF Supercup:

4 (1996, 1997, 1998, 1999), RECORD

VI) European Cup/ EHF Champions League winning percentage in a season

- 8th team to win all matches in a European Cup/ EHF Champions League season, JOINT RECORD
- First ever team to advance to the EHFCL FINAL4 with 100% victories, RECORD
- First ever team to win all the matches in an EHF Champions League season:

20 matches, 20 wins, 100% (2020-21 season), RECORD

VII) Coaches: Some records

- First ever coach to win 5 EHF Champions League titles in a row:

(Spain) Valero Rivera (1995-96 to 1999-2000), RECORD

- Most successful coach in European Cup/ EHF Champions League:

(Spain) Valero Rivera with 6 titles (1991, 1996 to 2000), RECORD

- Most successful coach in EHF Champions League:

(Spain) Valero Rivera with 5 titles (1996 to 2000), RECORD

- Most successful coaches in the EHF Champions League (EHFCL FINAL4 era):

(Spain) Xavi Pascual (2011, 2015, 2021) and (Spain) Antonio Carlos Ortega (2022, 2024, 2026), SHARED RECORD

- Coach with most EHFCL Final4 final appearances:

(Spain) Xavi Pascual with 6 finals (2010, 2011, 2013, 2015, 2020, 2021), RECORD

- Coach with back-to-back EHFCL Final4 final appearances:

(Spain) Xavi Pascual (2010, 2011 and 2020, 2021), SHARED RECORD

- Coach with multiple back-to-back EHFCL Final4 final appearances:

(Spain) Xavi Pascual with 2 (2010, 2011 and 2020, 2021), RECORD

VIII) Others

- Most successful athlete (player/coach combined) in European Cup/ EHF Champions League:

(Spain) Antonio Carlos Ortega with 9 titles (all with Barça): 6 as player (1996 to 2000, 2005); 3 as coach (2022, 2024, 2026) RECORD

- Most successful athlete (player/coach combined) in EHF Champions League:

(Spain) Antonio Carlos Ortega with 9 titles (all with Barça): 6 as player (1996 to 2000, 2005); 3 as coach (2022, 2024, 2026) RECORD

- Athlete (player/coach combined) with most final appearances (European Cup/EHF Champions League combined):

(Spain) Antonio Carlos Ortega with 11 finals appearances (10 with Barça): 7 as player (1996 to 2001, 2005); 4 as coach (3 with Barça: 2022, 2024, 2026)

== Notable former coaches/Players ==
=== Notable former coaches ===
- (Spain) Antonio Lázaro
- (Spain) Josep Vilà
- (Spain) Sergio Petit
- (Spain) Miquel Roca
- (Spain) Valero Rivera (1983–2003)
- (Spain) Xesco Espar (2004–2007)
- (Spain) Manolo Cadenas (2007–2009)
- (Spain) Xavier Pascual Fuertes (2009–2021)
- (Spain) Antonio Carlos Ortega (2021–present)

=== Notable former players ===
- (Spain) Mikel Aguirrezabalaga
- (Spain) David Barrufet
- (Spain) Joan Cañellas
- (Spain) Alberto Entrerríos
- (Spain) Raúl Entrerríos
- (Spain) Rubén Garabaya
- (Spain) Juanín García
- (Spain) Mateo Garralda
- (Spain) Òscar Grau
- (Spain) Rafael Guijosa
- (Spain) Demetrio Lozano
- (Spain) Enric Masip
- (Spain) Xavier O'Callaghan
- (Spain) Antonio Carlos Ortega
- (Spain) Salvador Puig
- (Spain) Lorenzo Rico
- (Spain) Albert Rocas
- (Spain) Iker Romero
- (Spain) Joan Sagalés
- (Spain) Víctor Tomás González
- (Spain) Cristian Ugalde
- (Spain) Iñaki Urdangarín
- (Spain) (Serbia and Montenegro) Arpad Šterbik
- (Spain) (Ukraine) Andrei Xepkin
- (Spain) Daniel Sarmiento Melián
- (Spain) Eduardo Gurbindo
- (Spain) Aitor Ariño
- (Spain) Gonzalo Pérez de Vargas
- (Argentina) Eric Gull
- (Bosnia and Herzegovina) Senjanin Maglajlija
- (Bosnia and Herzegovina) Muhamed Memić
- (Bosnia and Herzegovina) (Qatar) Danijel Šarić
- (Belarus) Siarhei Rutenka
- (Brazil) Thiagus Petrus
- (Brazil) Haniel Langaro
- (Chile) Marco Oneto
- (Croatia) Patrik Ćavar
- (Croatia) Davor Dominiković
- (Croatia) Venio Losert
- (Croatia) Igor Vori
- (Croatia) Marko Kopljar
- (Croatia) Luka Cindrić
- (Czech Republic) Michal Kasal
- (Czech Republic) Filip Jícha
- (Denmark) Lasse Andersson
- (Denmark) Joachim Boldsen
- (Denmark) Mikkel Hansen
- (Denmark) Kasper Hvidt
- (Denmark) Lars Krogh Jeppesen
- (Denmark) Kevin Møller
- (Denmark) Casper Ulrich Mortensen
- (Denmark) Jesper Nøddesbo
- (Denmark) Emil Nielsen
- (Egypt) Ali Zein
- (North Macedonia) Kiril Lazarov
- (North Macedonia) Borko Ristovski
- (France) Jérôme Fernandez
- (France) Nikola Karabatić
- (France) Yanis Lenne
- (France) Cédric Sorhaindo
- (France) Melvyn Richardson
- (Germany) Christian Schwarzer
- (Germany) Erhard Wunderlich
- (Hungary) László Nagy
- (Iceland) Aron Pálmarsson
- (Iceland) Guðjón Valur Sigurðsson
- (Norway) Frode Hagen
- (Norway) Glenn Solberg
- (Poland) Kamil Syprzak
- (Poland) Bogdan Wenta
- (Romania) Alexandru Dedu
- (Russia) Konstantin Igropulo
- (Serbia) Mladen Bojinović
- (Serbia) Ivan Lapčević
- (Serbia) Petar Nenadić
- (Serbia) Dejan Perić
- (Serbia) Nenad Peruničić
- (Serbia) Dragan Škrbić
- (Slovenia) Jure Dolenec
- (Slovenia) Luka Žvižej
- (Slovenia) Domen Makuc
- (Sweden) Mattias Andersson
- (Sweden) Mathias Franzén
- (Sweden) Magnus Jernemyr
- (Sweden) Jonas Larholm
- (Sweden) Fredrik Ohlander
- (Sweden) Johan Sjöstrand
- (Sweden) Tomas Svensson
- (Sweden) Hampus Wanne
- (Tunisia) Walid Ben Amor
- (Tunisia) Wael Jallouz
- (Socialist Federal Republic of Yugoslavia) Petrit Fejzula
- (Socialist Federal Republic of Yugoslavia) Milan Kalina
- (Socialist Federal Republic of Yugoslavia) Zlatko Portner
- (Socialist Federal Republic of Yugoslavia) Veselin Vujović
- (Socialist Federal Republic of Yugoslavia) Veselin Vuković
