= Xavier O'Callaghan =

Spanish handball player (born 1972)

Xavier O’Callaghan
Personal information
- Full name: Xavier O’Callaghan Ferrer
- Nationality: Spanish
- Born: 2 March 1972 (age 54) Tarragona, Spain
- Height: 1.86 m (6 ft 1 in)

Sport
- Sport: Handball
- Position: Centre back
- Number: 4

Youth career
- Years: Team
- 1986–1990: FC Barcelona

Senior clubs
- Years: Team
- 1990–2005: FC Barcelona
National team
Years	Team	Apps	(Gls)
1993–2004	Spain	87	(140)
Medal record
Men's Handball
Bronze medal – third place	2000 Sydney	Team

Xavier O'Callaghan Ferrer (born 2 March 1972 in Tarragona, Spain is a Spanish handball player who competed in the 2000 Summer Olympics and in the 2004 Summer Olympics.

He came up through the youth ranks at FC Barcelona, and here he played his entire career. He won 55 titles with the club, including the EHF Champions League 6 times. FC Barcelona has retired the number 4, his shirt number in his honour.

In the 2000 Olympics he won the bronze medal with the Spanish team. He played three matches and scored five goals.

Four years later he finished seventh with the Spanish handball team in the 2004 Olympic tournament. He played six matches and scored eight goals.

He was included in the European Handball Federation Hall of Fame in 2023.

== Honours ==
- EHF Champions League
  - Winner: 2024
