= Joan Sagalés =

Spanish handball player (born 1959)

Personal information
- Born: 15 November 1959 (age 66) Berga, Spain
- Height: 178 cm (70 in)

Sport
- Sport: Handball
- Position: Left back

Youth career
- Years: Team
- –: FC Barcelona

Senior clubs
- Years: Team
- 1977–1991: FC Barcelona
National team
Years	Team	Apps	(Gls)
1980–1989	Spain	39	(42)

Joan Sagalés (born 15 November 1959) is a Spanish handball player. He competed in the men's tournament at the 1988 Summer Olympics.

At club level he played his entire career for FC Barcelona, where he won the Spanish Championship 7 times, the Spanish Cup 4 times, as well as the Spanish Supercup, the EHF Cup Winners' Cup and the EHF Champions League. After he retired, his number 14 shirt was retired by the club.
