= Andrei Xepkin =

Spanish handball player (born 1965)

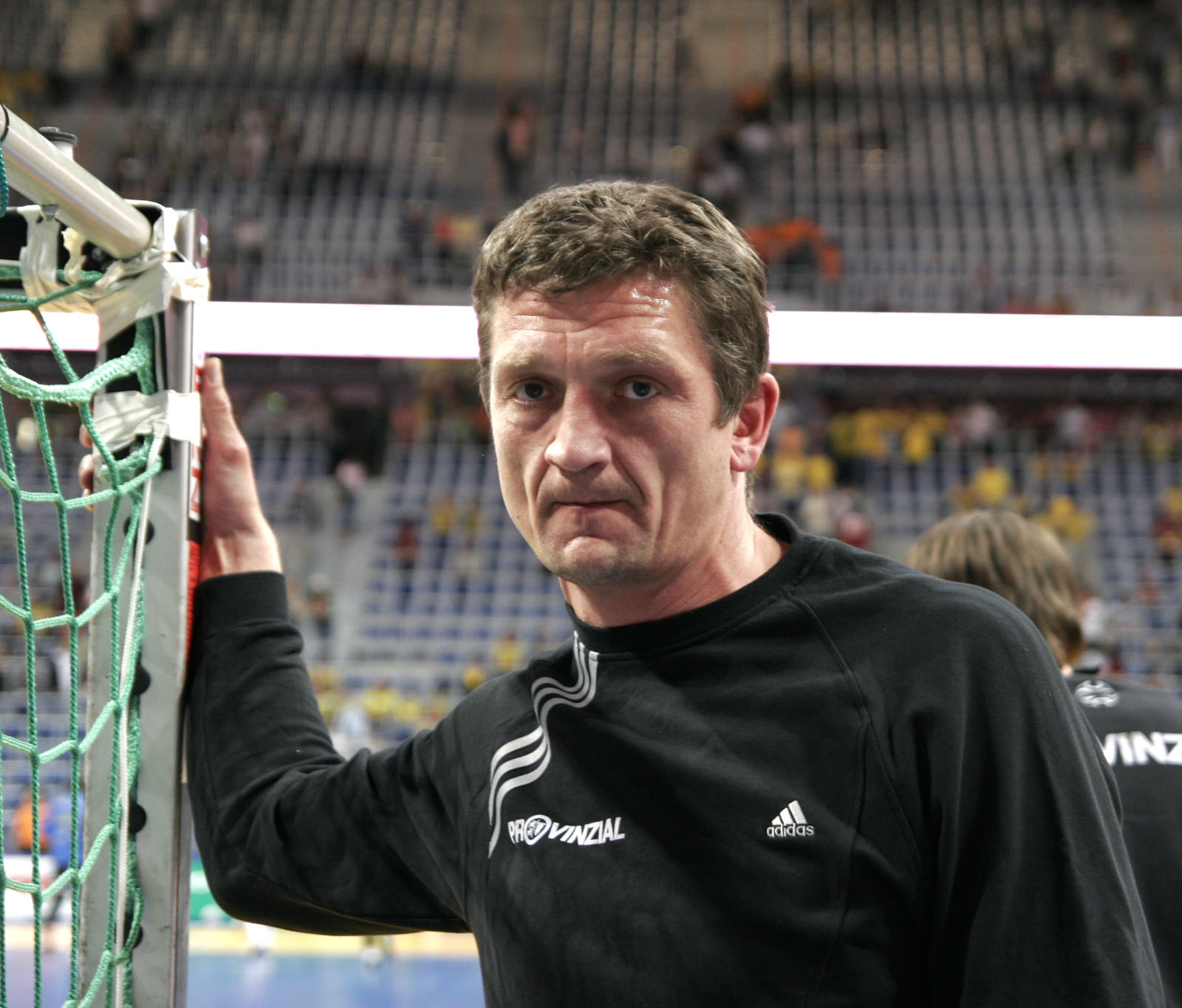
- Xepkin in 2007

Personal information
- Nationality: Spanish (until 1997 Ukrainian)
- Born: 1 May 1965 (age 61) Zaporizhzhia, Ukrainian SSR, Soviet Union
- Height: 2.05 m (6 ft 9 in)

Sport
- Sport: Handball
- Position: Pivot

Senior clubs
- Years: Team
- –1991: HC ZTR Zaporizhzhia
- 1991–1992: Puleva Maristas
- 1992–1993: CB Alzira
- 1993–2005: FC Barcelona Handbol
- 2007: THW Kiel
- 2007–2009: FC Barcelona Handbol
National team
Years	Team	Apps	(Gls)
1997–	Spain	78	(228)
Medal record
Men's handball
Representing Soviet Union
World Championships
Silver medal – second place	1990 Czechoslovakia	Team
Representing Spain
Olympic Games
Bronze medal – third place	2000 Sydney	Team
European Championships
Silver medal – second place	1998 Italy	Team
Bronze medal – third place	2000 Croatia	Team
- Updated on 3 September 2026

Andrei Xepkin Xepkina (Ukrainian: Андрій Щепкін, born 1 May 1965) is a Spanish and former Ukrainian handball player who competed in the 2000 Summer Olympics for Spain. He became Spanish citizen in 1998.

In 2000 he won the bronze medal with the Spanish team. He played all eight matches and scored 21 goals.

He was included in the European Handball Federation Hall of Fame in 2023.
