= Massy, Seine-Maritime =

Massy
- Commune
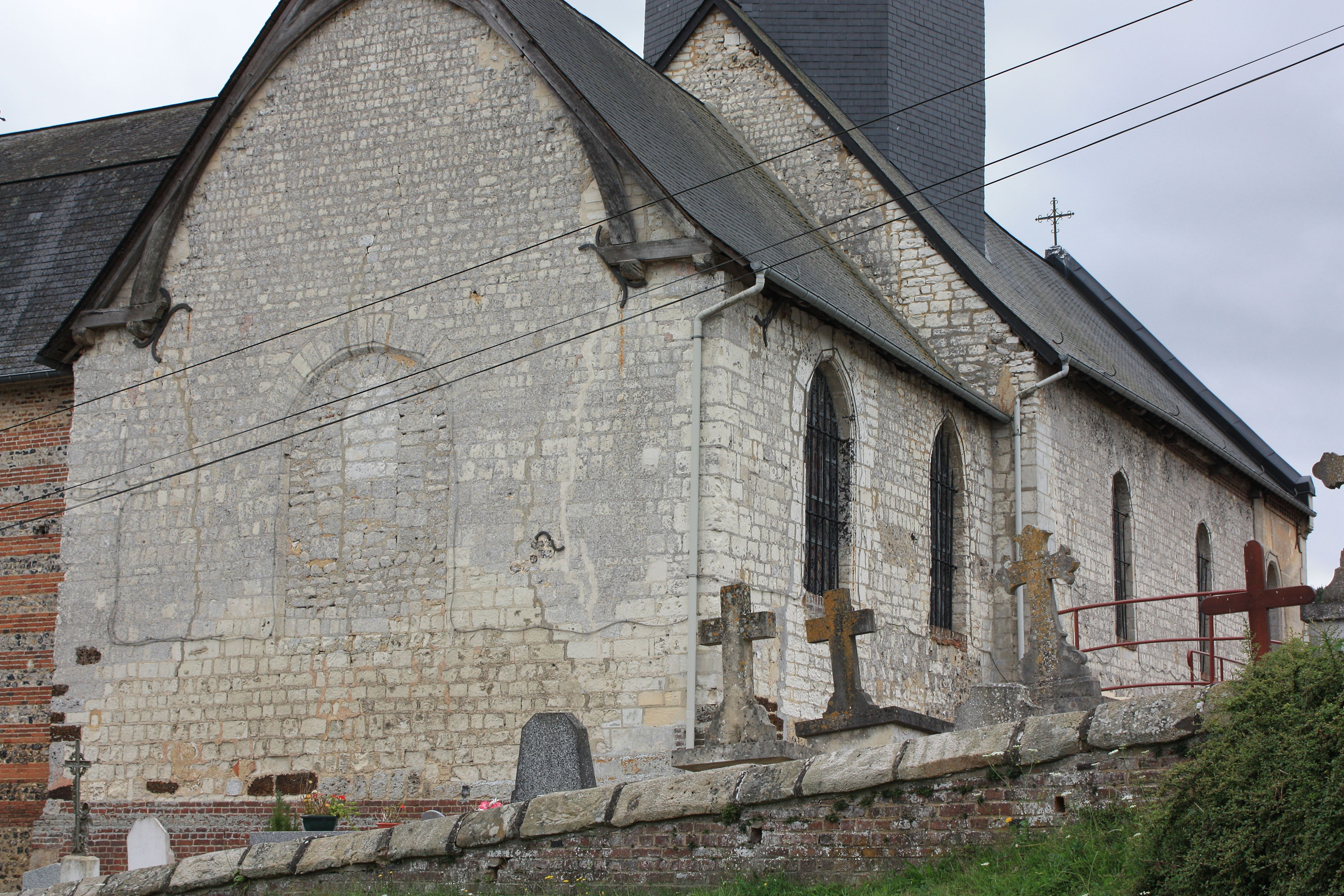
- The church in Massy

- Coat of arms
- Location of Massy
- Location within France Location within Normandy
- Coordinates: 49°41′23″N 1°24′01″E
- Country: France
- Region: Normandy
- Department: Seine-Maritime
- Arrondissement: Dieppe
- Canton: Neufchâtel-en-Bray
- Intercommunality: CC Bray-Eawy

Government
  - Mayor (2026–32): Didier Duclos
- Area^{1}: 11.24 km^{2} (4.34 sq mi)
- Elevation: 147 m (482 ft)
- Highest elevation: 234 m (768 ft)
- Lowest elevation: 91 m (299 ft)
- Population (2023): 316
  - Density: 28.1/km^{2} (72.8/sq mi)
- Time zone: UTC+01:00 (CET)
  - Summer (DST): UTC+02:00 (CEST)
- INSEE/Postal code: 76415 /76270
- ^{1} French Land Register data, which excludes lakes, ponds, glaciers > 1 km^{2} (0.386 sq mi or 247 acres) and river estuaries.

Massy (French pronunciation: [masi]) is a commune in the Seine-Maritime department in the Normandy region in northern France.

== Geography ==
A village of farming and associated light industry situated in the Pays de Bray, some 25 miles (40 km) southeast of Dieppe at the junction of the D24, the D114 and the D915 roads.

== Population ==
Historical population
Year	Pop.	±% p.a.
1968	288	—
1975	267	−1.08%
1982	274	+0.37%
1990	261	−0.61%
1999	275	+0.58%
2007	291	+0.71%
2012	333	+2.73%
2017	343	+0.59%
2023	316	−1.36%
Source: INSEE

== Places of interest ==
- The church of St.Pierre, dating from the thirteenth century.
- A maze.

== See also ==
- Communes of the Seine-Maritime department
