= Xavier Pascual Fuertes =

Spanish handball player and coach (born 1968)

Xavier Pascual
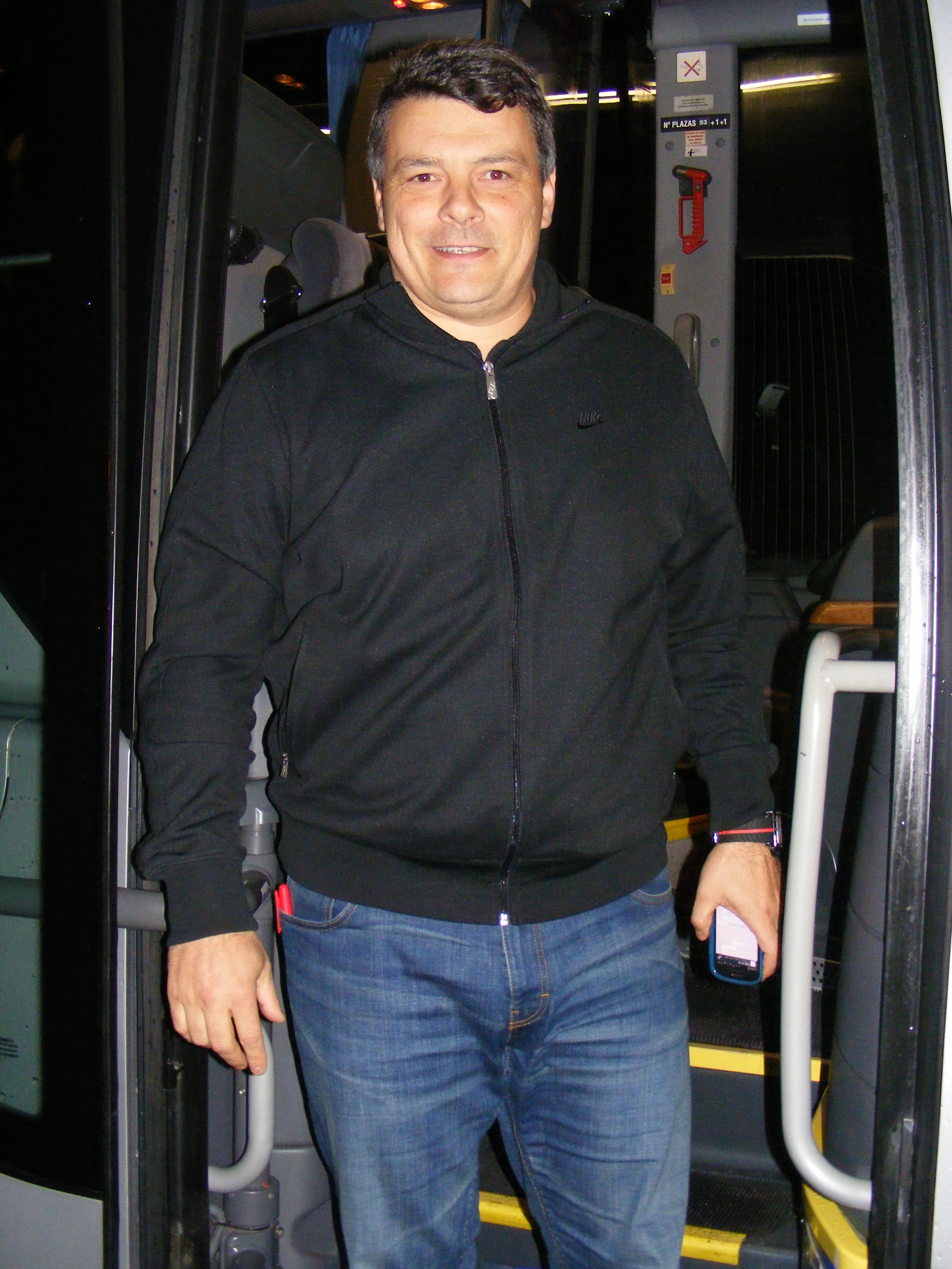
- Pascual Fuertes in 2014.

Personal information
- Full name: Xavier Pascual Fuertes
- Nationality: Spanish
- Born: 8 March 1968 (age 58) Barcelona, Spain

Sport
- Sport: Handball
- Position: Goalkeeper

Youth career
- Years: Team
- –: Barcelona

Senior clubs
- Years: Team
- 1986–1987: Barcelona
- 1987–1989: BM Palautordera
- 1989–1991: Barcelona
- 1991–1994: SD Teucro
- 1994–1995: CD Ademar León
- 1995–1996: BM Guadalajara
- 1996–1997: BM Gáldar
- 1997–1999: BM Chapela
- 1999–2005: SD Octavio Vigo

Teams managed
- 2009–2021: FC Barcelona
- 2016–2018: Romania
- 2021–2024: Dinamo București
- 2021–2024: Romania
- 2024–: ONE Veszprém
- 2025–: Egypt

Xavier Pascual Fuertes (born 8 March 1968) is a Spanish former handball player and current coach. He is one of the most successful handball coaches.

On 9 February 2009, he replaced Manolo Cadenas as head coach of Barcelona. Contemporaneously with his club job, he has been also coaching the Romania men's national handball team since June 6, 2016. In June 2018, Pascual resigned as Romania coach.

== International honours ==
=== Player ===
Barcelona

- Liga ASOBAL: 2
  - 1989-90, 1990–91
- Supercopa ASOBAL: 1
  - 1986-87
- European Cup: 1
  - 1991

=== Manager ===
Barcelona

- Liga ASOBAL: 11
  - 2010-11, 2011-12, 2012-13, 2013-14, 2014-15, 2015-16, 2016-17, 2017–18, 2018–19, 2019–20, 2020–21
- Copa del Rey: 10
  - 2008-09, 2009–10, 2013-14, 2014-15, 2015-16, 2016–17, 2017–18, 2018–19, 2019–20, 2020–21
- Copa ASOBAL: 11
  - 2009–10, 2011–12, 2012–13, 2013–14, 2014–15, 2015–16, 2016–17, 2017–18, 2018–19, 2019–20, 2020–21
- Supercopa ASOBAL: 10
  - 2009–10, 2012–13, 2013–14, 2014–15, 2015–16, 2016–17, 2017–18, 2018–19, 2019–20, 2020–21
- EHF Champions League: 3
  - 2011, 2015, 2021
- IHF Super Globe: 5
  - 2013, 2014, 2017, 2018, 2019

Dinamo Bucharest

- Liga Națională: 3
  - 2021–22, 2022–23, 2023–24
- Romanian Cup: 2
  - 2021–22, 2023–24
- Romanian Super Cup: 2
  - 2022, 2023

Veszprém KC

- Magyar Kupa: 1
  - 2025–26
- IHF Super Globe: 1
  - 2024

Egypt

- African Championship: 1
  - 2026
