= Juan de Dios Román =

Spanish handball coach (1942–2020)

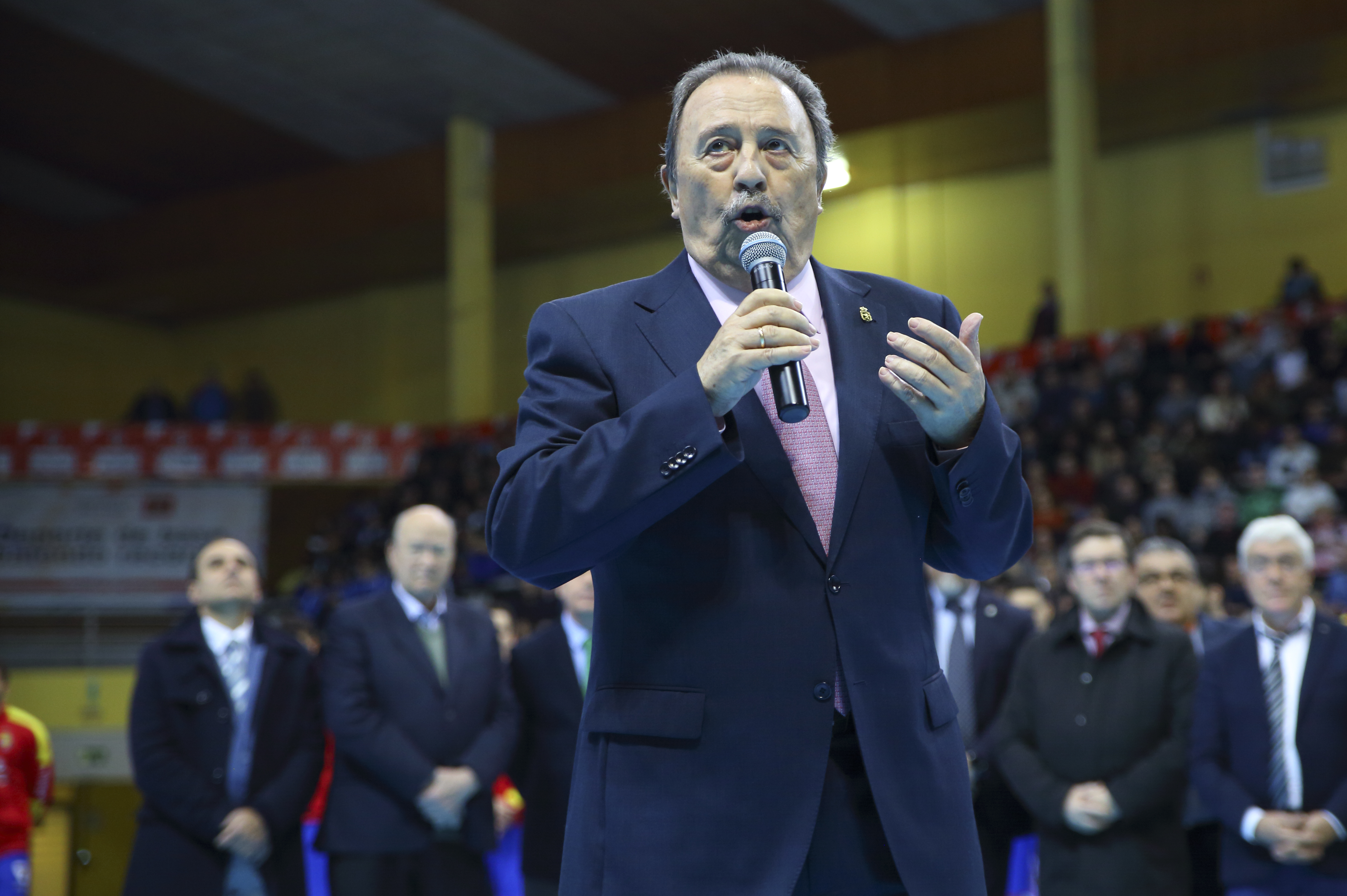
- Juan de Dios Román in 2018

Personal information
- Nationality: Spanish
- Born: 17 December 1942 Mérida, Spain
- Died: 28 November 2020 (aged 77) Madrid, Spain

Sport
- Sport: Handball

Teams managed
- Years: Team
- 1971–1985: Atlético Madrid BM
- 1985–1988: Spain
- 1990–1992: Atlético Madrid BM
- 1995–2000: Spain
- 2003–2005: BM Ciudad Real

Juan de Dios Román Seco (17 December 1942 – 28 November 2020) was a Spanish handball coach. He served as coach for the Spain men's national handball team from 1985 to 1988 and again from 1995 to 2000. He was President of the Royal Spanish Handball Federation from 2008 to 2013.

== Awards ==
=== Club Awards ===
- Finalist in the EHF Champions League (1985, 2005)
- Champion of Spain (1979, 1981, 1983, 1984, 1985, 2004)
- Copa del Rey de Balonmano (1978, 1979, 1981, 1982)
- Winner of the Copa ASOBAL (2004, 2005)

=== National Team Awards ===
==== Olympics ====
- 9th place in the 1988 Summer Olympics
- Bronze Medal at the 1996 Summer Olympics
- Bronze Medal at the 2000 Summer Olympics

==== European Men's Handball Championship ====
- Silver Medal at the 1996 European Men's Handball Championship
- Silver Medal at the 1998 European Men's Handball Championship
- Bronze Medal at the 2000 European Men's Handball Championship

==== World Men's Handball Championship ====
- 5th place at the 1986 World Men's Handball Championship
- 11th place at the 1995 World Men's Handball Championship
- 7th place at the 1997 World Men's Handball Championship
- 4th place at the 1999 World Men's Handball Championship
