= Antonio Carlos Ortega =

Spanish handball player (born 1971)

Antonio Ortega
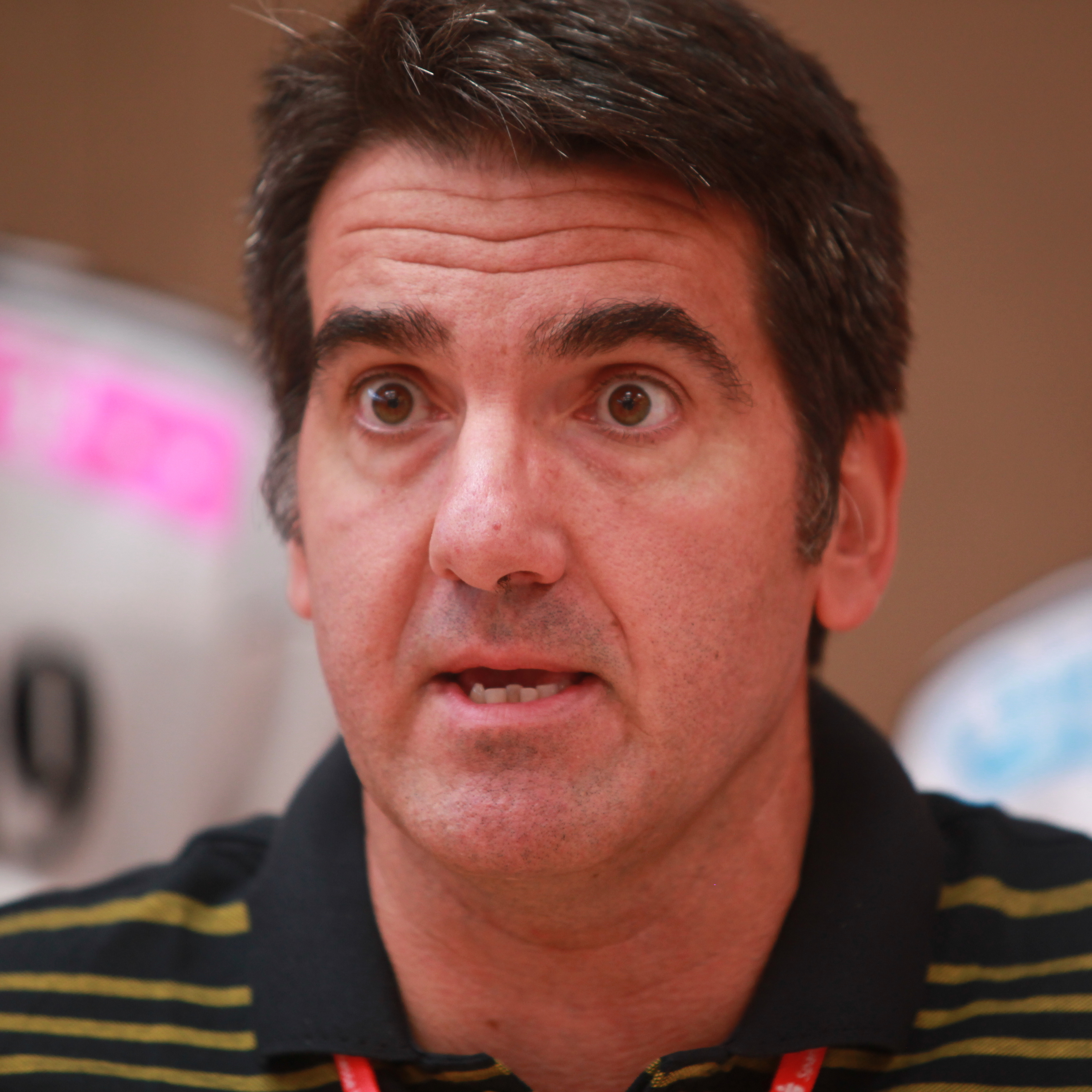

Personal information
- Full name: Antonio Carlos Ortega Pérez
- Nationality: Spanish
- Born: 11 July 1971 (age 55) Málaga, Spain
- Height: 1.84 m (6 ft 0 in)

Sport
- Sport: Handball
- Position: Right back/wing
- Current club: FC Barcelona

Senior clubs
- Years: Team
- 1990–1994: CB Maristas Málaga
- 1994–2005: FC Barcelona
National team
Years	Team	Apps	(Gls)
–	Spain	144	(507)

Teams managed
- 2005–2011: BM Antequera
- 2012–2015: MKB-MVM Veszprém
- 2016–2017: Japan
- 2016–2017: KIF Kolding København
- 2017–2021: TSV Hannover-Burgdorf
- 2021–: FC Barcelona
- 2024: Japan
Medal record
Olympic Games
Bronze medal – third place	2000 Sydney	Team
European Championship
Silver medal – second place	1998 Italia
Bronze medal – third place	2000 Croatia

Antonio Carlos Ortega Pérez (born 14 July 1971) is a Spanish former handball player who is the current head coach of FC Barcelona.

He competed in the 2000 Summer Olympics and in the 2004 Summer Olympics. At the 2000 Olympics, he won the bronze medal with the Spanish team. He played all eight matches and scored 31 goals. Four years later, e played all seven matches and scored 23 goals. Spain finished in 7th place.

== Honours ==
- EHF Champions League
  - Winner: 2024
