= Royal Spanish Handball Federation =

Sports governing body in Spain

Royal Spanish Handball Federation RFEBM
- IOC nation: Kingdom of Spain
- Sport: Handball
- Other sports: Beach handball; Wheelchair handball
- Official website: www.rfebm.com

HISTORY
- Year of formation: 1 September 1941; 85 years ago

AFFILIATIONS
- International federation: International Handball Federation (IHF)
- IHF member since: 1948; 78 years ago
- Continental association: European Handball Federation
- National Olympic Committee: Spanish Olympic Committee

GOVERNING BODY
- President: Francisco V. Blázquez García (Spain)

The Royal Spanish Handball Federation (Spanish: Real Federación Española de Balonmano, RFEBM) is the national handball association in Spain. It is a member of the European Handball Federation (EHF) and the International Handball Federation (IHF).

The organisation is responsible for the indoor handball national teams (men's and women's), and the beach handball national teams (men's and women's). As of 2023, the federation has 869 registered clubs and 100,704 federated players.

== Honours ==
=== National team ===
==== Men ====
- Olympics

- Bronze Medal (5): 1996, 2000, 2008, 2020, 2024

- World Championship

- Winner (2): 2005, 2013
- Third place (3): 2011, 2021, 2023

- European Championship

- Winner (2): 2018, 2020
- Runner-up (5): 1996, 1998, 2006, 2016, 2022
- Third place (2): 2000, 2014

==== Women ====
- Olympics

- Bronze Medal (1): 2012

- World Championship

- Runner-up (1): 2019
- Third place (1): 2011
- Fourth place (2): 2009, 2021

- European Championship

- Runner-up (2): 2008, 2014

=== National youth teams ===
==== Men ====
- Junior World Championship

- Winner (1): 2017
- Runner-up (5): 1987, 1989, 1995, 2001, 2013
- Fourth place (3): 1977, 1991, 2003

- Youth World Championship

- Winner (1): 2023
- Runner-up (2): 2011, 2017
- Fourth place (2): 2013, 2015

- U20 European Championship

- Winner (4): 2012, 2016, 2022, 2024
- Runner-up (1): 1996
- Third place (2): 2000, 2014, 2021

- U18 European Championship

- Winner (1): 1994, 2022
- Runner-up (2): 1999, 2010
- Third place (2): 1992, 2014

==== Women ====
- Junior World Championship

- Fourth place (2): 2001, 2008

- Youth World Championship

- Winner (1): 2024

- U19 European Championship

- Runner-up (1): 2007
- Third place (1): 2002

- U17 European Championship

- Winner (1): 1997
- Runner-up (1): 2007

== Presidents ==
Presidents
| S. No. | President | Tenure start |
|---|---|---|
| 1 | Emilio Suárez Marcelo | 1 January 1941 |
| 2 | Emilio García Martín | 1 January 1954 |
| 3 | José Ángel Castro Fariñas | 1 January 1956 |
| 4 | Carlos Albert Aceituno | 20 November 1962 |
| 5 | Alberto San Román y de La Fuente | 24 September 1965 |
| 6 | Félix Sánchez-Laulhe | 24 December 1972 |
| 7 | Roberto Tendero Llofriu | 1 December 1981 |
| 8 | Javier Loinaz Dolhagaray (interim) | 26 December 1989 |
| 9 | Jesús López Ricondo | 1 April 1990 |
| 10 | Domingo Bárcenas | 26 December 1992 |
| 11 | Jesús López Ricondo (2) | 1 November 1996 |
| 12 | Juan de Dios Román | 17 December 2008 |
| 13 | Francisco V. Blázquez García | 26 April 2013 |
