= Xesco Espar =

Spanish handball player and trainer (born 1963)

Francesc "Xesco" Espar Moya (born January 4, 1963, in Barcelona, Catalonia, Spain) is a handball trainer and a former player.

He began playing handball in Sagrada Família school in Barcelona, GEIEG club in Girona and finally in the professional team of FC Barcelona Handbol.

After that he began to train some of the younger categories of FC Barcelona, being later the third trainer of the professional team and finally in the 2004-05 season became the trainer of FC Barcelona Handbol. In 2007, he is replaced by Manolo Cadenas.

== Trophies ==
As trainer

- 1 European Cups (2004–2005)
- 1 Liga ASOBAL (2005–2006)
- 1 King's Cups (2006–2007)
- 2 Pirenees Leagues (2005–2006 i 2006-2007)
- 1 Spanish Supercups (2006–2007)
