= Iberian Supercup =

Annual Sports Competition

- Founded: 2022
- No. of teams: 4
- Country: Spain; Portugal
- Most recent champion: FC Barcelona (5th title) (2026)
- Most titles: FC Barcelona (5 titles)

The Iberian Supercup (Spanish: Supercopa Ibérica, Portuguese: Supertaça Ibérica) is an annual men's cup competition for Spanish and Portuguese handball teams. It was first held in 2022. The participating teams from Portugal are the 1st and 2nd placed teams from previous season of Andebol 1 and from Spain it is the winner of Liga ASOBAL and winner Copa del Rey de Balonmano or the runner-up of Copa del Rey de Balonmano if the same team won both. It's played in 4 matches taking place during one weekend. Where the winner of the Spanish and Portugal league face the other team from the other nation in semi-finals during Saturday. Then on Sunday the winners of both semi-finals face each-other in the final while the losers play 3rd place match. So far the hosting of the tournament has alternated between the two nations.

The Supercopa Ibérica replaced the previous Supercopa ASOBAL in Spain, but in Portugal the Supertaça continues to be held.

FC Barcelona are the current champions, having won all editions of the competition since its creation.

== Previous ==
Year	Champion	Score	Runners-up	Third place	Score	Fourth place	Venue
2022	(Spain) FC Barcelona	32–24	(Portugal) FC Porto	(Spain) BM Granollers	40–38	(Portugal) Sporting CP	(Spain) Polideportivo Ciudad Jardín, Málaga
2023	(Spain) FC Barcelona	44–38	(Portugal) FC Porto	(Portugal) Sporting CP	39–29	(Spain) La Rioja	(Portugal) Centro Cultural de Viana do Castelo [pt], Viana do Castelo
2024	(Spain) FC Barcelona	38–33	(Portugal) Sporting CP	(Portugal) FC Porto	30–27	(Spain) Bathco BM Torrelavega	(Spain) Pabellón Vicente Trueba, Torrelavega
2025	(Spain) FC Barcelona	35–34	(Portugal) Sporting CP	(Portugal) FC Porto	28–23	(Spain) ABANCA Ademar León	(Portugal) Centro de Desportos e Congressos de Matosinhos, Matosinhos
2026	(Spain) FC Barcelona	39–34	(Portugal) Sporting CP	(Portugal) FC Porto	32–25	(Spain) Bidasoa Irun	(Spain) Instituto Ferial de Vigo [es], Vigo

== Titles by team ==
Rank	Club	Won	Runners-up	Third	Fourth	Years won	Years participated
1	(Spain) FC Barcelona	5	0	0	0	2022, 2023, 2024, 2025, 2026	2022, 2023, 2024, 2025, 2026
2	(Portugal) Sporting CP	0	3	1	1		2022, 2023, 2024, 2025, 2026
3	(Portugal) FC Porto	0	2	3	0		2022, 2023, 2024, 2025, 2026
4	(Spain) BM Granollers	0	0	1	0		2022
5	(Spain) La Rioja	0	0	0	1		2023
5	(Spain) Bathco BM Torrelavega	0	0	0	1		2024
5	(Spain) ABANCA Ademar León	0	0	0	1		2025
5	(Spain) Bidasoa Irun	0	0	0	1		2026
