= Valero Rivera López =

Spanish handball coach (born 1953)

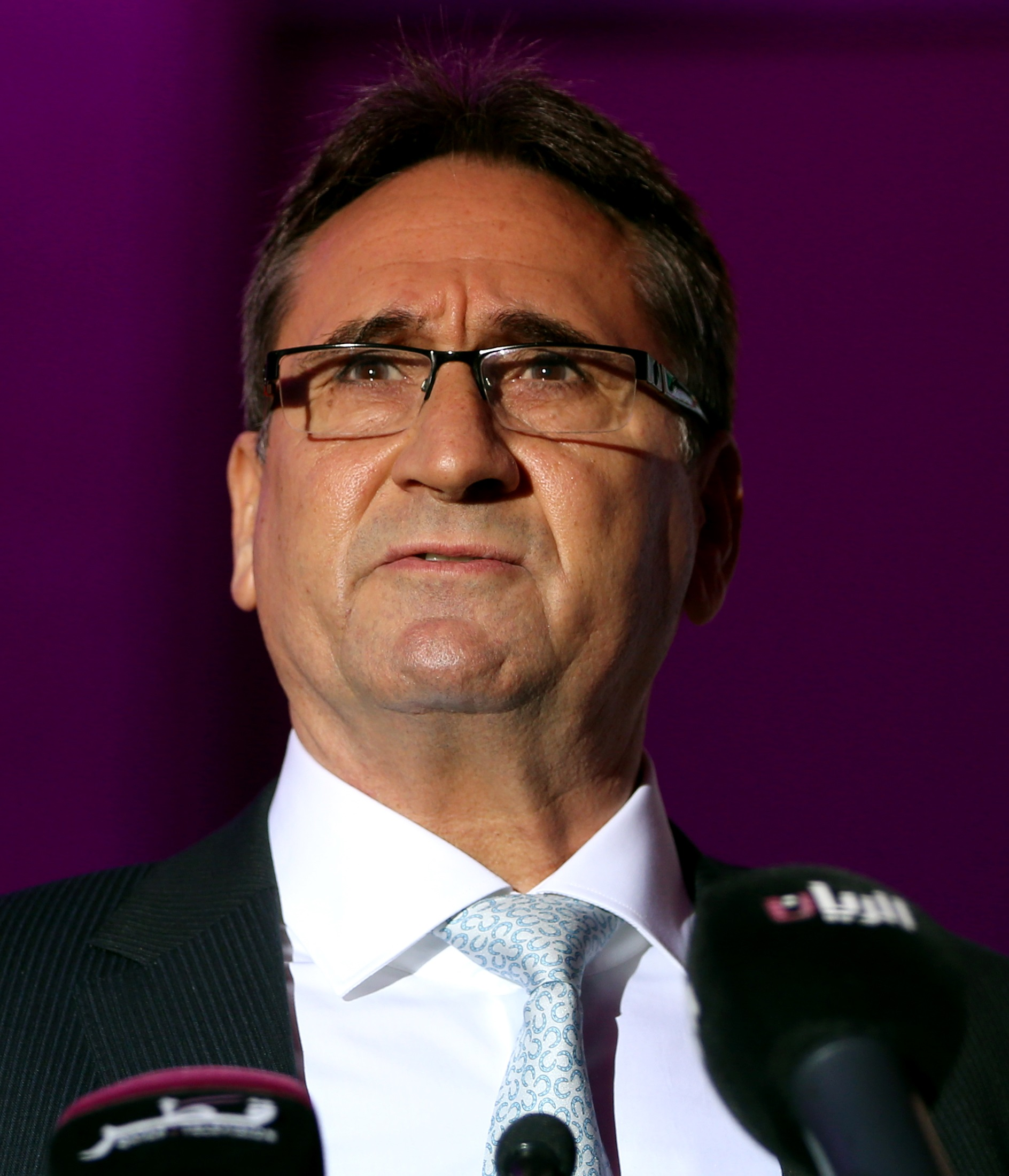
- Rivera in 2014

Personal information
- Nationality: Spanish
- Born: 14 February 1953 (age 73) Zaragoza, Spain
- Height: 1.84 m (6 ft 0 in)

Sport
- Sport: Handball

Youth career
- Years: Team
- 1966–1971: FC Barcelona

Senior clubs
- Years: Team
- 1971–1983: FC Barcelona

Teams managed
- 1983–2003: FC Barcelona
- 2008–2013: Spain
- 2013–2025: Qatar
Medal record
World Championships
| Gold medal – first place | 2013 Spain |
| Bronze medal – third place | 2011 Sweden |
Asian Championships
| Gold medal – first place | 2014 Bahrain |
| Gold medal – first place | 2016 Bahrain |
| Gold medal – first place | 2018 South Korea |
| Gold medal – first place | 2020 Kuwait |
| Gold medal – first place | 2022 Saudi Arabia |

Valero Rivera López (born 14 February 1953) is a Spanish handball coach and former player. He is a world champion from the 2013 World Championship where he coached the Spanish national team. He played for and has coached FC Barcelona and is considered a club legend. In 2012 he was named the best men's coach in the world by the International Handball Federation.

He is the father of fellow handballer Valero Rivera Folch, who he has also coached.

== Playing career ==
Valero Rivera played his entire career for Barcelona. He debuted for the senior team in the 1971-72 season. He played until 1983, and won 8 titles with the club as a player.

== Coaching career ==
=== FC Barcelona ===
When he retired at 31 he became a coach at Barcelona, replacing Jordi Petit. He coached the club for 21 years, where they became one of the best teams in the world, winning the EHF Champions League multiple titles. He left the club in 2005. By then he had won over 70 club titles.

=== Spain ===
In 2008 he became the head coach of the Spanish national team. His first success was at the 2011 World Championship, where he won bronze medals. A year later he participated in the 2012 European Men's Handball Championship held in Serbia.

In 2013 he became a World champion winning the 2013 World Championship on home soil.

=== Qatar ===
Later the same year he took over the Qatari national team. Here he won the Asian championship 5 times in a row from 2014 to 2022.

At the 2015 World Championship he coached the Qatari team to a silver medal. This was the first time an Asian team had reached the World Cup final. The tournament was however marred with criticism of the Qatari team. A large number of players in the Qatar team had been naturalised in the years leading up to the championship. According to IHF rules, to gain eligibility for a new national team, a player cannot have played for another nation for three years in an official match. This allowed several foreign-born players, including Spanish-born Borja Vidal, Goran Stojanović and Jovo Damjanović from Montenegro, and Bertrand Roiné who previously played for France, to play for the Qatar team at the championship. According to the Frankfurter Allgemeine, only four of the 17 players in the squad were native to Qatar. The practice was criticised by Austrian goalkeeper after his team's loss to Qatar in the round of 16, saying "It [felt] like playing against a world selection team" and "I think it is not the sense of a world championship." At a press conference during the championship, Valero Rivera declined to comment on the matter. Spanish player Joan Cañellas did not think it was an issue, saying "If they can do it, why not." Furthermore The referees were widely accused of being one-sided in favour of the hosts. Especially at the matches against Austria, Germany and Poland. After the final whistle, the Polish players showed their discontent by ironically applauding the three referees.

He retired from the Qatari national team in 2023.

== Private ==
He has a degree in sport from Instituto Nacional de Educación Física de Cataluña.
