= Liga ASOBAL 2009–10 =

Liga ASOBAL 2009–10 season (known as the SabadellAtlántico ASOBAL for sponsorship reasons) was the 20th since its establishment. Ciudad Real were the defending champions, having won their 4th La Liga title in the previous season. The campaign began on Saturday, 13 September 2008. The league was originally scheduled to end on 16 May 2009. A total of 16 teams contest the league, 14 of which have already contested in the 2008–09 season, and two of which have been promoted from the División de Honor B. In addition, a new match ball - the SELECT Super Five - is serving as the official ball for all matches. Ciudad Real played a season without a loss and won the title for the 2nd consecutive time.

== Promotion and relegation ==
Teams promoted from 2008–09 División de Honor B de Balonmano

- Lábaro Toledo
- CB Cangas (Frigoríficos del Morrazo)

Teams relegated to 2009–10 División de Honor B de Balonmano

- Teucro
- Keymare Almería

== Team information ==
Teams playing in Liga ASOBAL 2009-10

Team	Venue	Capacity
BM Alcobendas	Severo Ochoa	3,000
Antequera 2010	Fernando Argüelles	2,575
JD Arrate	Polideportivo Ipurua	3,500
CAI BM Aragón	Príncipe Felipe	12,000
FC Barcelona	Palau Blaugrana	8,250
Ciudad Real	Quijote Arena	5,107
Cuenca 2016	El Sargal	1,900
Fraikin Granollers	Palau D'Esports	6,500
Frigoríficos del Morrazo	O'Gatañal	2,500
Lábaro Toledo	Javier Lozano Cid	2,500
Naturhouse La Rioja	Palacio de los Deportes	3,851
Octavio Pilotes Posada	As Travesas	3,500
Pevafersa Valladolid	Huerta del Rey	3,500
Portland San Antonio	Pabellón Universitario	3,000
Reale Ademar León	Palacio Municipal	6,000
CB Torrevieja	Palacio de los Deportes	4,500

== League table ==
- Final standings

	Team	P	W	D	L	G+	G−	Dif	Pts
1	Ciudad Real	30	30	0	0	959	736	223	60
2	Barcelona Borges	30	27	1	2	974	770	204	55
3	Pevafersa Valladolid	30	22	2	6	883	765	118	46
4	Reale Ademar	30	18	4	8	881	806	75	40
5	Naturhouse La Rioja	30	16	2	12	863	843	30	34
6	Reyno de Navarra S.A.	30	16	2	12	914	865	49	34
7	CAI BM Aragón	30	14	3	13	827	845	-18	31
8	Fraikin Granollers	30	12	3	15	884	879	5	27
9	Alcobendas	30	10	5	15	828	872	-44	25
10	Cuenca 2016	30	10	4	16	860	921	-61	24
11	Antequera 2010	30	10	4	16	824	856	-32	24
12	Torrevieja	30	10	1	19	782	857	-75	21
13	Arrate	30	8	3	19	814	911	-97	19
14	Lábaro Toledo	30	8	2	20	832	914	-82	18
15	Octavio Pilotes Posada	30	7	1	22	803	899	-96	15
16	Frigoríficos del Morrazo	30	3	1	26	713	902	-189	7

EHF Champions League
EHF Cup Winners' Cup
EHF Cup
Relegated to División de Honor B

2009–10 Liga ASOBAL winners
(Castilla–La Mancha)
Ciudad Real
Fifth title

== Top goal scorers ==
Player	Goals	Team
(Spain) Josep Masachs	183	Pilotes Posada
(Montenegro) Novica Rudović	172	Pilotes Posada
(Serbia) Dalibor Čutura	160	Arrate
(Serbia) Ivan Nikčević	159	Reyno de Navarra S.A.
(Slovenia) Borut Ošlak	156	Frigoríficos Morrazo
(Spain) David Cuartero	156	Torrevieja
(Montenegro) Aleksandar Svitlica	151	Fraikin Granollers
(Serbia) Miloš Pešić	151	Alcobendas
(Cuba) Jorge Paván	148	Cuenca 2016
(Spain) Rafael Baena	147	Antequera 2010

== Top goalkeepers ==
Player	Saves	Shots	Team
(Slovenia) Blaž Vončina	353	1174	Arrate
(Serbia) Dimitrije Pejanović	342	1010	Torrevieja
(Spain) Jorge Martínez	314	973	Antequera 2010
(Spain) Diego Moyano	309	924	Lábaro Toledo
(Sweden) Fredrik Ohlander	304	971	Fraikin Granollers
(Serbia) Danijel Šarić	284	713	Barcelona Borges
(Serbia) Milan Kosanović	269	947	Frigoríficos Morrazo
(Montenegro) Rade Mijatović	251	822	Alcobendas
(Sweden) Tomas Svensson	243	665	Pevafersa Valladolid
(Spain) Iñaki Malumbres	243	756	CAI BM Aragón
