= Petar Metličić =

Croatian handball player (born 1976)

Personal information
- Nationality: Croatian
- Born: 25 December 1976 (age 49) Split, SFR Yugoslavia
- Height: 1.94 m (6 ft 4 in)

Sport
- Sport: Handball
- Position: Right back

Youth career
- Years: Team
- –: RK Split

Senior clubs
- Years: Team
- 1993–1998: RK Brodomerkur Split
- 1998–2002: RK Metković Jambo
- 2002–2005: CB Ademar León
- 2005–2010: BM Ciudad Real
- 2010–2012: RK Pivovarna Laško Celje
- 2012–2013: Montpellier
National team
Years	Team	Apps	(Gls)
1997–2009	Croatia	175	(471)

Teams managed
- 2015–2017: Croatia (assistant)
Medal record
Men's handball
Representing Croatia
Olympic Games
Gold medal – first place	2004 Athens	Team
World Championship
Gold medal – first place	2003 Portugal	Team
Silver medal – second place	2005 Tunisia	Team
Silver medal – second place	2009 Croatia	Team
Statoil World Cup
Gold medal – first place	2006 Sweden & Germany	Team
European Championship
Silver medal – second place	2008 Norway	Team
Mediterranean Games
Gold medal – first place	2001 Tunis	Team

Petar Metličić (born 25 December 1976) is a Croatian former handball player. He was captain of the Croatian national team from 2006 to 2009, after the departure of Slavko Goluža. He won the gold medal at the 2004 Summer Olympics in Athens as well as at the 2003 World Championship in Portugal.

At club level he played in the top tier in Croatia, Spain, Slovenia and France. He has won the EHF Champions League three times and the EHF Champions Trophy twice with BM Ciudad Real as well as the IHF Super Globe and EHF Cup Winner's Cup with CB Ademar León, and the EHF Cup with RK Metković Jambo.

In September 2007 he opened, alongside his former colleague Ivano Balić, the "Balić-Metličić" handball academy. Metličić is also a coach in the academy.

From February 2015 to January 2017 he served as an assistant coach to Željko Babić in the Croatia men's team.

== Honours ==
=== Player ===
Brodomerkur Split

- Croatian First A League
  - Runner up (2): 1996–97, 1997–98
- Croatian First B League - South
  - Winner (1): 1994–95

Metković Jambo

- Croatian First League
  - Winner (1): 2001–02 (revoked)
- Croatian First A League
  - Winner (3): 1998–99, 1999–00, 2000–01
- Croatian Cup
  - Winner (2): 2001, 2002
- EHF Cup
  - Winner (1): 2000
  - Finalist (1): 2001

Ademar Leon

- EHF Cup Winner's Cup
  - Winner (1): 2005
- Supercopa ASOBAL
  - Finalist (1): 2003

Ciudad Real

- Liga ASOBAL
  - Winner (4): 2006–07, 2007–08, 2008–09, 2009–10
  - Runner up (1): 2005–06
- Copa del Rey
  - Winner (1): 2008
  - Finalist (2): 2006, 2009
- Copa ASOBAL
  - Winner (3): 2006, 2007, 2008
  - Finalist (1): 2010
- Supercopa ASOBAL
  - Winner (1): 2008
  - Finalist (2): 2009, 2010
- EHF Champions League
  - Winner (3): 2005–06, 2007–08, 2008–09
- EHF Champions Trophy
  - Winner (2): 2006, 2008
- IHF Super Globe
  - Winner (2): 2007, 2010

Pivovarna Laško Celje

- 1. NLB Leasing liga
  - Runner up (1): 2011–12
- Slovenian Cup
  - Winner (1): 2012

Montpellier

- LNH Division 1
  - Runner up (1): 2012–13
- Coupe de la France
  - Winner (1): 2013

Individual

- Best Croatian handball player by Sportske novosti & HRS – 2003
- Franjo Bučar State Award for Sport – 2004

== Orders ==
- Order of Danica Hrvatska with face of Franjo Bučar – 2004

Sporting positions
Preceded by Slavko Goluža; 5	Captain of Croatia; 2006–2009	Succeeded by Igor Vori; 7
