= Mirza Džomba =

Croatian handball player (born 1977)

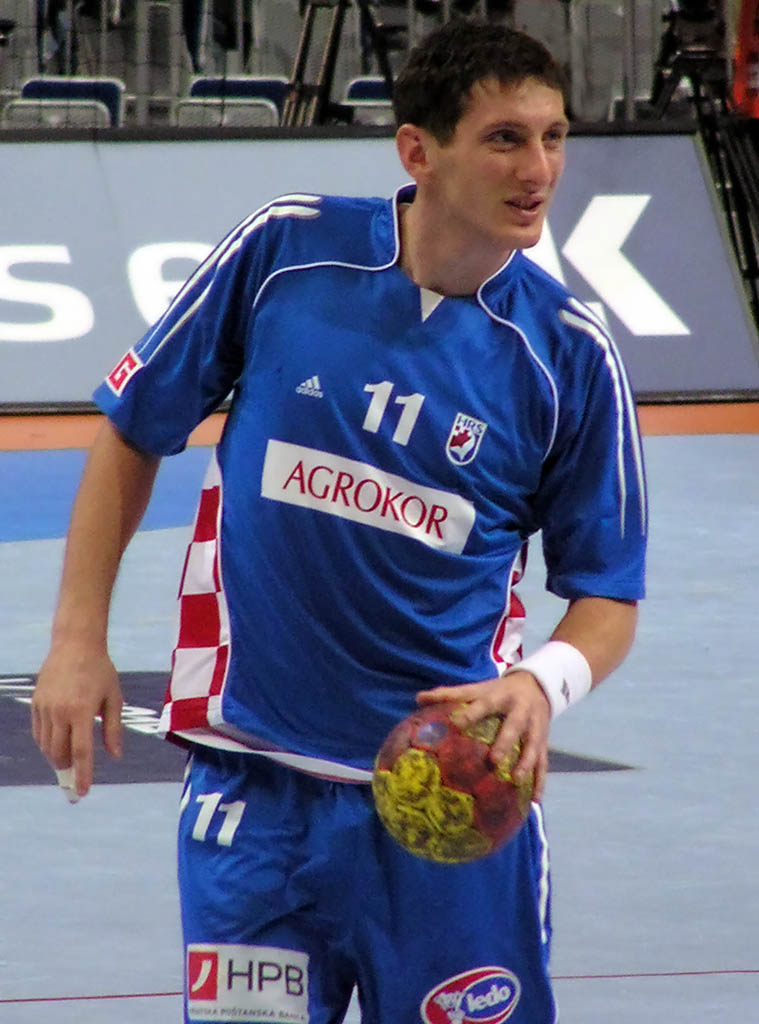
- Džomba playing with the Croatia national team

Personal information
- Full name: Mirza Džomba
- Nationality: Croatian
- Born: 28 February 1977 (age 49) Rijeka, SR Croatia, SFR Yugoslavia
- Height: 1.91 m (6 ft 3 in)

Sport
- Sport: Handball
- Position: Right wing

Youth career
- Years: Team
- 1990–1994: RK Zamet

Senior clubs
- Years: Team
- 1994–1997: RK Zamet
- 1997–2001: Badel 1862 Zagreb
- 2001–2004: Fotex Veszprém
- 2004–2007: BM Ciudad Real
- 2007–2010: RK CO Zagreb
- 2010–2011: Vive Targi Kielce
National team
| Years | Team | | |
| 1994–1995 | Croatia U-19 | | |
| 1995–1996 | Croatia U-20 | | |
| 1996–1997 | Croatia U-21 | | |
| 1997–2001 | Croatia B | 15 | (52) |
| 1997–2008 | Croatia | 173 | (719) |
Title
| 2016– | President | HA-PGK | |
| 2016– | Board member | RSF | |
Medal record
Men's handball
Representing Croatia
Olympic Games
| Gold medal – first place | 2004 Athens | Team |
World Championship
| Gold medal – first place | 2003 Portugal | Team |
| Silver medal – second place | 2005 Tunisia | Team |
European Championship
| Silver medal – second place | 2008 Norway | Team |
Statoil World Cup
| Gold medal – first place | 2006 Sweden & Germany | Team |
Super Cup
| Silver medal – second place | 1999 Germany | Team |
Mediterranean Games
| Gold medal – first place | 1997 Bari | Team |
| Gold medal – first place | 2001 Tunis | Team |

Mirza Džomba (born 28 February 1977) is a Croatian former professional handball player, World champion in 2003 and Olympic champion in 2004. He is noted by many critics as one of the best right wings ever. In 2013 Džomba was awarded the best right wing in the history of the EHF Champions League by the European Handball Federation. He played for RK Zamet, Badel 1862 Zagreb, Fotex Veszprém, BM Ciudad Real, and Vive Targi Kielce before retiring in 2011.

He was also a member of the Croatia national team from 1997 to 2008. He holds the national team's top goal scorer record with 719 goals. He was part of the golden generation that won the 2003 World Championship and 2004 Summer Olympics.

Džomba has also played in six EHF Champions League finals while winning one with Ciudad Real. Among other awards, he was nominated three times for the IHF World Player of the Year award, reaching third place in 2004 and 2005, and second place in 2006.

He is currently a handball pundit on RTL Television, usually with former teammate Goran Šprem.

== Early life ==
Džomba was born on 28 February 1977 in Rijeka, SR Croatia, SFR Yugoslavia. He is the son of Mirsada and Mensur Džomba. He has a brother, Amir, who is two years older. He is of Bosniak origin. His parents are from Bosnia and Herzegovina, his father from Doboj and his mother from Bosanska Gradiška.

His talent was discovered by Veno Đonlić in Škurinje, in the former elementary school "Ivo Lola Ribar", (now Elementary School "Škurinje"). Later, he joined RK Zamet where his first coach in youth selections was Vjekoslav Sardelić.

== Club career ==
=== Zamet ===
Džomba began his senior career at RK Zamet. In 1994 Džomba had a key role in the Zamet U-17 squad getting a third-place finish at the Croatian U-17 Championship. Džomba was called up by the head coach of the senior team, Drago Žiljak, in the latter half of the 1993–94 season. The next season saw a coaching change at Zamet as Ivan Munitić was appointed head coach. Džomba was playing solidly the 1994–95 season but unfortunately Zamet was relegated at the end of the season finishing in 9th place.

The next season Žiljak was appointed as head coach again. Džomba helped Zamet gain promotion form the 1.B league back to the 1.A league. The same year he also helped his U-19 side win the Croatian U-19 Championship. At the tournament he was voted MVP and was the tournament's top scorer. Džomba also had a good Cup beating Metković in the Round of 16 but losing to a very strong Croatia Banka Zagreb in the quarter-finals. During the following 1996–97 season Džomba was a regular started in the first half of the season.

=== Badel 1862 Zagreb ===
In January 1997 Džomba transferred to RK Badel 1862 Zagreb.

Džomba won the league and cup that season. He also played in his first EHF Champions League finals losing to FC Barcelona in both matches (31:22, 30:23). He scored seven goals in the tournament.

After the beginning of the 1997–98 season in October Zagreb played in the EHF Champions Trophy. They qualified as the fourth club special EHF invitee. Zagreb played against Caja Cantabria Santander in the semi-final and won 21:32, Džomba scored three goals in the match. Zagreb played FC Barcelona in the final and lost 28:22. Džomba did not play in the final match. Džomba sparked two more domestic titles in 1998 winning the 1.A league with a strong lead only losing two games throughout the season and winning the Croatian Cup defeating RK Đakovo 37:25 in the final match.

The Champions League campaign had a similar result as last year a losing to FC Barcelona the first match 28:18 and in the second 28:22, 56:40 on aggregate. Džomba scored three goals in the first match.

The next league season began with new head coach Velimir Kljaić behind the bench. Džomba achieved his best season yet in 1999 scoring 23 goals in the Champions League and helping his dominant side to an easy league win. Unfortunately Zagreb lost another final to FC Barcelona having a draw of 22:22 in the first match in Zagreb and losing the second 18:29 in Barcelona. Džomba scored 4 goals during the first match but got suspended so he couldn't play the second. Zagreb also had a rough Cup finals defeating Medveščak Zagreb in a narrow win of 23:22.

At the start of the 1999–00 season Zdravko Zovko became head coach. Zagreb provided a solid domestic campaign as usual holding only two loses in the league. They provided a strong cup run as well defeating a strong Metković Jambo in the quarter-final and Brodokumer Split in the semi-final. In the final Džomba faced his old club RK Zamet called Zamet Autotrans then and scored five goals for his side in a 33:28 win for Zagreb.

The Champions League campaign started out well with RK Zagreb going undefeated in the group stage reaching the semi-finals. In the semi-finals Zagreb played against THW Kiel losing the first away match 32:21 and winning the home match 30:25, altogether losing 45:43 on aggregate.

The 2000–01 season started off with Zagreb in deep financial troubles. Many players had left the club due to not getting more than eight months' worth of their salaries. Lino Červar was appointed as the new head coach in the summer of 2000. Džomba was appointed the team captain. Zagreb's Champions League campaign was their worst in years. The club reached the quarter-final where they were defeated in both matches by their old rival FC Barcelona, 40:55 on aggregate. Zagreb's Cup run did not go well either. After defeating Trogir Alpro ATT and RK Đakovo in the quarter-finals they lost in the semi-final to Metković Jambo, 25:26. For the first time since the first Croatian Cup in 1992 Zagreb would not participate in the final.

League results saw them in first place during the regular part of the season with 20 wins 1 draw and 1 loss, Metković Jambo had the same results. During the championship play-offs they beat Zamet Crotek in both matches reaching the final where they played against Metković Jambo. During the final playoff match in the 59th minute the players of Metković Jambo left the field because the referee didn't side a foul on Goran Jerković, a player of Metković. The score was 22:21 for Zagreb the week after it was decided by Croatian Handball Federation that the match will be registered as 10:0 for Badel 1862 Zagreb.

=== Fotex Veszprém ===
In 14 June it was announced that Mirza Džomba would be joining Hungarian champions Fotex Veszprém.

With Džomba's teammates from Badel 1862 Zagreb: Zlatko Saračević, Božidar Jović, and head coach Zdravko Zovko, in the club Džomba adjusted to in his new club. Džomba established himself in the club with goals in the Champions League.

On 10 November during Fotex Veszprém played their first Champions League group stage match against Vardar Vatrost. Skopje Džomba scored 8 goals bringing Veszprém to victory with the result 24:27. The second match was played seven day later on the 18th against S.O. Chambéry. Džomba helped his side again being the top scorer with 7 goals the finals result was 29:13 for the Hungarians

25 November saw a victory against SC Magdeburg with the result 24:20; Džomba scored 3 goals. After defeating S.O. Chambéry in France 26:28 with Džomba scoring 2 goals he brought Veszprém home with 6 goals against Vardar Vatrost. Skopje taking first place in Group D. On 15 December Veszprém received their first loss in the Champions League campaign from SC Magdeburg. Džomba played very badly scoring only 1 goal.

In the quarter-final they faced C.BM. Ademar Leon who got defeated home and away with results 22:27 and 18:30. The semi-final saw Veszprém play against Portland San Antonio. Veszprém won the first game at home with Džomba providing 4 goals but lost the second 27:21 to witch Džomba scored 6 goals. In the end Veszprém won on aggregate 48:46 and proceeded to the final.

In the final they played against SC Magdeburg. The first match was played in Veszprém where Veszprém won with the result 23:21. The second match was played in Magdeburg where Veszprém lost 30:25. Džomba scored 6 goals in both the finals matches.

Džomba failed to win the Champions League trophy for the fourth time but he did win both the domestic league and cup with the club that season.

At the start of the new season Fotex Veszprém were invited to participate in the EHF Champions Trophy. The semi-final match was played on 25 October in Dessau Veszprém played against the EHF Cup champions THW Kiel and won with the result 23:31. They played in the finals against SC Magdeburg a day later in Magdeburg and lost in a close match with the result 30:31.

Fotex Veszprém started their Champions League campaign going undefeated through the group stage. In the quarter-finals they faced Kolding IF. The first match at home was an easy win of 36:26 but there was a loss of 30:26, Fotex Veszprém advanced to the semi-finals. In the semi-finals they lost the first match against Portland San Antonio 28:20 and won the second match 30:26 but did not advance to the finals. Fotex Veszprém yet again won both domestic trophy's.

Following Džomba's success in the national team and his superb performances for Veszprém, on 27 November 2003 Džomba announced that he would be moving to BM Ciudad Real at the end of the 2003–04 season. Veszprém would eventually lose to Ciudad Real in the Champions League quarter-finals. Džomba scored 37 goals in the Champions League that season and won the Hungarian league and cup.

=== Ciudad Real ===
Džomba came to BM Ciudad Real during the summer of 2004 after the Summer Olympics had ended. He made his first appearance for the club in the Supercopa ASOBAL final against FC Barcelona in 15 September. During the match Džomba scored two goals and was heavily injured when Barcelona's player Lars Jeppesen fell on him. Ciudad won 32:29. The next day Ciudad's physiotherapist announced that Džomba had sprained ligaments in his left knee and that he would be unable to play for six weeks.

Džomba made his return on 7 October in a match against BM Alcobendas where he scored 11 goals to a victory of 36:33. Two days later he played his first Champions League match for Ciudad against Izviđač Ljubuški. He scored six goals in a 37:23 victory.

Soon Džomba became a regular in the starting seven of head coach Juan de Dios Román. Against Pfadi Winterthur Džomba scored five goals for another win.

On 20 October Ciudad Real gave a staggering defeat to Teka Cantabria with the result 35:21 Džomba was yet again one of the better players of the match, scoring seven goals. During the next matches against KIF Kolding and Bidasoa Irún Džomba scored six goals in both matches for Ciudad's victory. In the fourth match of the Champions League group stage Ciudad Real played against Pfadi Winterthur on 30 October in Winterthur. Džomba scored 10 goals and single-handedly saved the match for a win of 26:27 for Ciudad Real.

On 5 November Džomba and colleague Petar Metličić scored seven goals for another victory against Caja España Ademar. After winning against Izviđač Ljubuški Ciudad completed their group stage undefeated with a win against KIF Kolding entering the quarter-finals of the EHF Champions League. On 25 November Džomba once again saved his side in the domestic championship scoring six goals against Torrevieja with the result being 35:29.

For his world class performances for club and national team Džomba was for the first time nominated for the IHF World Player of the Year Award for the year 2004. Džomba and his national team colleague Ivano Balić were the only Croatian players nominated. Džomba finished in third place.

After defeating GOG Gudme in the round of 16 Džomba faced his former club Fotex Veszprém in the quarter-finals. Džomba scored nine goals in both victories against the Hungarians. On 20 March Džomba seven goals in a derby against BM Valladolid for another victory of Ciudad Real In the semi-finals Ciudad Real faced Montpellier. Ciudad Real won the first match at home 30:24 and lost the away match 33:31. Džomba scored nine goals during the semi-finals. During the first Champions League match Ciudad Real defeated FC Barcelona 28:27, Džomba scored three goals. The second match FC Barcelona won 29:27. Later that month BM Ciudad Real had also lost the Copa del Rey to BM Valladolid and the Liga ASOBAL to SDC San Antonio.

In the summer of 2005 Talant Duyshebaev became the new head coach of Ciudad Real while still playing for the team. On 29 September Džomba was part of a farewell match for Russian goalkeeper Andrej Lavrov alongside players such as Ivano Balić, Jackson Richardson, Lars Christiansen and many more handball legends. Later that month BM Ciudad Real had also lost the Copa del Rey to BM Valladolid and the Liga ASOBAL to SDC San Antonio.

Džomba's first EHF Champions League was against Dinamo Baumit Bucuresti in Buzau. Džomba helped his side to a win of 24:29 by adding five goals. The second match in the group stage was against Slovak Tatran Prešov. Džomba scored 6 goals in a swift 39:24 win result. The third match of the group stage was played against Džomba's former club Veszprém. Ciudad lost 31:29 away, Džomba scored two goals in a poor performance.

After a shady performance four days later Džomba saved his club from a loss in the domestic league by scoring eight goals against Keymare Almeríain a very close 28:27 win.

On 25 October Džomba was named Croatian handball player of the year by the Croatian Handball Federation. Polls voted in Džomba with 43 points, Ivano Balić with 36 in second place and Blaženko Lacković and Petar Metličić in third place with 16 points.

In November Ciudad Real was invited to participate in the EHF Champions Trophy by the EHF. The semi-final match was played 26 November against FC Barcelona-Cifec in León. Ciudad Real won 27:31 with Džomba providing four goals and one assist. Two days later the final match commenced against SC Magdeburg in León. Ciudad Real won 37:28 with Džomba providing seven goals. Džomba had won his first European trophy.

On 30 October Ciudad Real beat Portland San Antonio in the finals of the ASOBAL Cup with the final result coming to 23:31. Džomba scored seven goals.

During the first quarter-final match against Laško Pivovara Celje, Ciudad Real won 34:27. Džomba scored nine goals with four assists from Petar Metličić. Džomba also provided two assists. The second match was played in Celje. Ciudad won 28:33 with Džomba scoring seven goals. The first semi-final match Ciudad played at home against SG Flensburg-Handewitt in an easy win of 31:22. Džomba scored up to six goals. Ciudad also won the second match in Flensburg in a final result of 27:29. Džomba scored five goals.

Ciudad Real faced Portland San Antonio in the EHF Champions League final winning both matches on 47:62 aggregate. Džomba scored eight goals in both matches finally winning the EHF Champions League. Ciudad Real failed to win the Liga ASOBAL being behind Barcelona by two points. Although Džomba didn't win the domestic championship he was voted best right wing in the Spanish league.

Džomba was yet again nominated for the IHF World Player of the Year in 2005. He finished in third place again.

Before the start of the 2006–07 on 7 September Džomba announced it would be his last season with BM Ciudad Real and that he would be moving to RK Zagreb.

In a group stage match of the EHF Champions League Džomba scored 10 goals against Kadetten Schaffhausen for a win with the result 39:31.

Džomba secured the EHF Champions Trophy yet again with Ciudad Real scoring eight goals in the semi-final match against Chekhovskiye Medvedi and nine in the final against VfL Gummersbach making him the tournaments top goalscorer with 17 goals.

On 21 December won the ASOBAL Cup against Portland San Antonio with the result 27:29. Džomba scored four goals alongside his colleague Petar Metličić In the quarter-finals of the EHF Champions League Ciudad faced Portland San Antonio. They won the first match at home 26:21 but lost the second away 29:37; the defending champions were knocked out. Džomba scored five goals in each of the matches.

Džomba was nominated for the IHF World Player of the Year in 2006. He finished in second place again losing to his national team teammate Ivano Balić.

At the end of the domestic season in June BM Ciudad Real were first with 57 points, three points higher than the second placed Portland San Antonio. Džomba had won his first Liga ASOBAL season title. Džomba's last match in the league was 3 June against FC Barcelona-Cifec. Džomba scored 10 goals for a win of 33:32. He was the matches top scorer and best player of the match.

Džomba's last trophy for the club was winning the IHF Super Globe which was held from 5 to 9 June in Cairo, Egypt.

=== Croatia Osiguranje Zagreb ===
On 14 June 2007 it was announced that Džomba had officially signed for RK Croatia Osiguranje Zagreb.

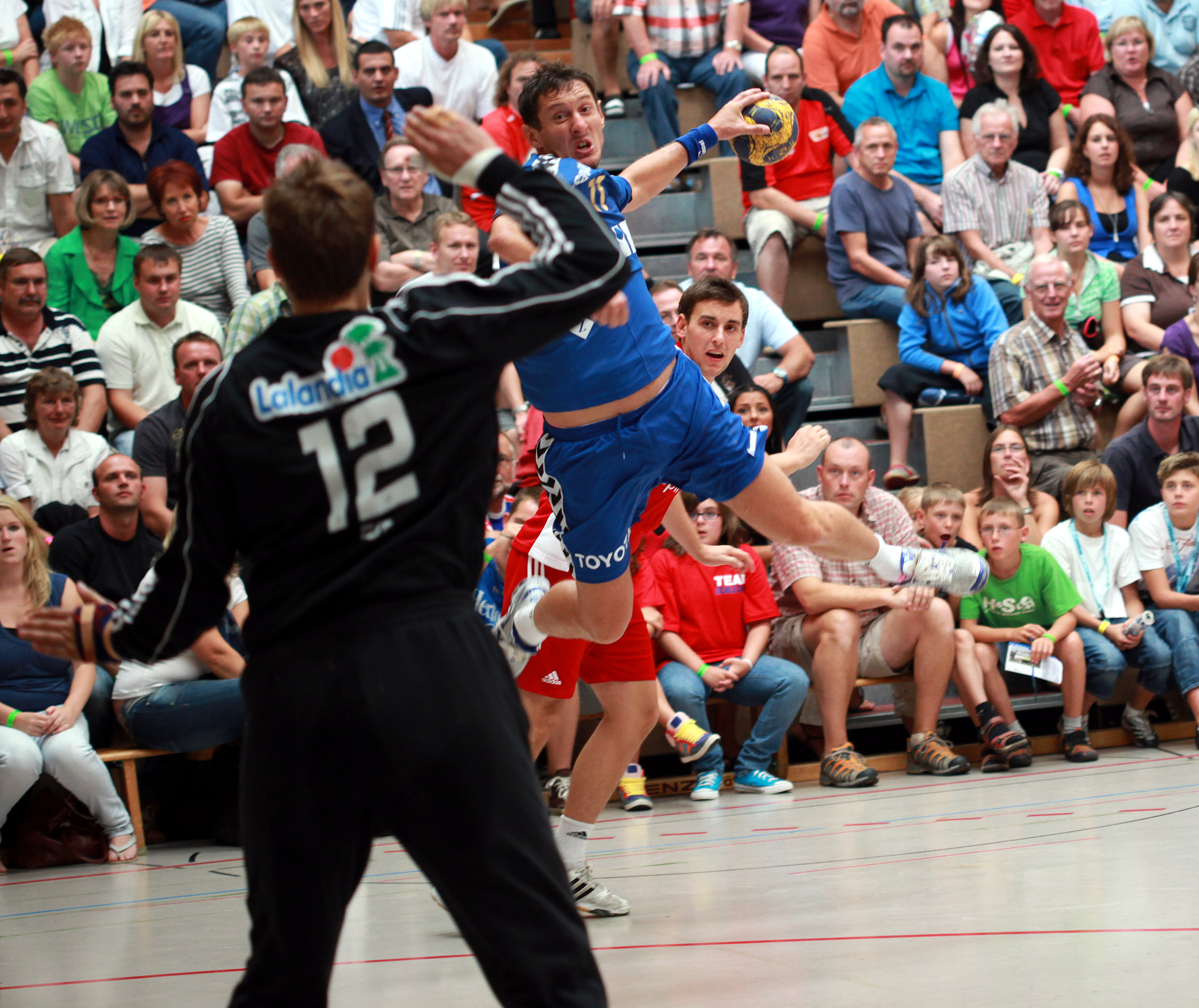
Džomba playing for CO Zagreb at Schlecker Cup in 2009

Džomba played his first match in the newly found Croatian Premier League in an away match against NEXE Našice. Džomba scored 7 goals for a victory of 30:36. During his first season he helped his side reach the main round of the EHF Champions League but sadly they did not progress to the semi-finals. Due to injuries Džomba could not play at his usual level. Džomba score 39 goals in the EHF Champions League that season. In the domestic league they were undefeated securing the league and cup titles.

During his second season Džomba yet again secured both domestic titles with CO Zagreb and reached the quarter-finals of the EHF Champions League. The first match was played at home where they played a draw 28:28; the second was played in Kiel. There CO Zagreb lost to THW Kiel. In August 2009 Džomba played in a farewell match of Swedish handball player Stefan Lövgren.

In his last season with CO Zagreb Džomba won the Croatian Premier League and Croatian Cup and reached the knockout stage of the EHF Champions League. Džomba announced on 30 April 2010 that he would be leaving CO Zagreb after his contract expired in the summer.

=== Vive Kielce ===
On 15 June 2010 it was confirmed that the Džomba signed a contract with Polish Superliga title holders Vive Kielce.

He played one season in Poland, winning the cup and reaching in the league playoff finals, where regular season winners Kielce were beaten 1–3 by Wisła Płock in the best-of-five series. Džomba scored 25 goals in the EHF Champions League for Kielce.

On 10 November 2010 in a Cup match against KS Azoty-Puławy Džomba got red carded for the first time in his entire career.

=== End of career ===
On 3 January 2011 Džomba played a friendly match in New York City with the World All Stars team against the German Bundesliga team. The Bundesliga team won 32:31. The match was played to promoted handball in the United States.

Džomba announced his retirement from professional handball in August 2011 at the age of 34.

Džomba made 26 league appearances for Kiel while scoring 138 goals.

== International career ==
Džomba was first called up to play for the Croatian national team in 1997 by head coach Josip Glavaš. at the 1997 World Championship in Japan. Croatia finished in 13th place at the tournament being knocked out in the 16th round by Spain. A month later, Džomba was selected for the Mediterranean Games in Bari by new head coach Ilija Piljević. Croatia reached the finals and defeated Italy 21:20. Džomba won his first gold medal for the national team.

In 1998 Velimir Kljaić was appointed new head coach of the national team for the upcoming European Championship in Italy. At that point, Džomba had already made 23 appearances for Croatia and scored 65 goals. Croatia failed to pass the group stage acquiring fourth place in Group B. Croatia lost the 7th place match against France 30–28.

Džomba next represented his country at the 1999 World Championship in Egypt which was held from 1 to 15 June. Croatia passed through the group stage with 3 wins, 1 draw and 1 loss. They were eliminated in the 16th round in a painful loss against Yugoslavia (30–23). Croatia's final standing was in 10th place.

Velimir Kljaić was sacked after the tournament and Zdravko Zovko was appointed head coach. From 8 to 12 September the Pre-Olympic Tournament was held. Due to recent poor results on the World and European Championship's Croatia needed to win this tournament to qualify for the 2000 Summer Olympics in Sydney. Croatia finished second in the tournament losing their last match to Sweden 22:30. Džomba had failed to go on his first Olympics. A month later in October from 21 to 24 Džomba played in the Super Cup with his country in Germany. They beat Sweden 28:25, played a draw with Germany 24:24 and lost to Russia 26:27 finishing in 2nd place. In January 2000 the 2000 European Championship was held in Croatia. Džomba and his teammates failed to get past the group drawing stage with France in their last group match losing a very important point. They also lost the 5th place match to Slovenia.

Josip Milković was appointed as the new head coach after the tournament. With the departure of Irfan Smajlagić Džomba became a regular in the starting seven.

At the 2001 World Championship in France at the second match Croatia played against United States. Džomba got injured during the match and could not compete for the rest of the tournament. Croatia won the match and made their biggest win in history 41:12. Croatia finished in 9th place. In August 2001 Džomba won another Mediterranean gold medal with Croatia. At the 2002 European Championship Croatia finished dead last in 16th place losing all of their group matches. Josip Milković was sacked after the tournament.

Ivano Balić, Renato Sulić, Denis Špoljarić, Nikša Kaleb, Slavko Goluža, Mirza Džomba and Goran Šprem celebrating winning the 2003 World Championship

In March 2002 Lino Červar was appointed as the new head coach of Croatia.

Džomba was selected to play at the World Championship in 2003. Croatia started the tournament with a loss against Argentina. In their second match Croatia beat Saudi Arabia 18:25. Next they beat Russia (26:28), France (23:22) and Hungary (30:29). Croatia proceeded to second phase of the competition where they beat Egypt (29:23) and Denmark (33:27). In the semi-finals Croatia defeated Spain 37:29 in overtime. Džomba scored 22 goals in the tournament 8 of them in the final match against Germany where Croatia won 34:31 and became World Champions. Džomba was voted best right wing of the tournament and placed in the tournament all star team.

Croatia's next major tournament was the 2004 European Championship in Slovenia. The tournament was held from 22 January to 1 February. Croatia went undefeated through the preliminary Group Stage defeating Spain (29:30), Denmark 26:25 and drawing with Portugal (32:32). During the main Group Stage Croatia beat Sweden (26:28), Switzerland (27:30) and played a draw against Russia (24:24). In the semi-final, Croatia lost to the host Slovenia (27:25) and lost their third place match against Denmark (27:31). Džomba was the tournaments top goalscorer with 46 goals.

Džomba's next journey with the national team was in Athens. At the 2004 Summer Olympics Croatia played undefeated throughout the tournament and won the gold medal. Džomba and his teammates defeated Iceland (34:30), Slovenia (26:27), South Korea (29:26), Russia (25:26), Spain (30:26), Greece (33:27), Hungary (33:31) and Germany in the final. Džomba scored 9 goals in the match. He was voted the best right wing of the tournament and placed in the all star team. At the tournament Džomba was voted best right wing, voted in the tournament dream team and was the 2nd goalscorer of the tournament. He was also the second highest goalscorer with 55 goals.

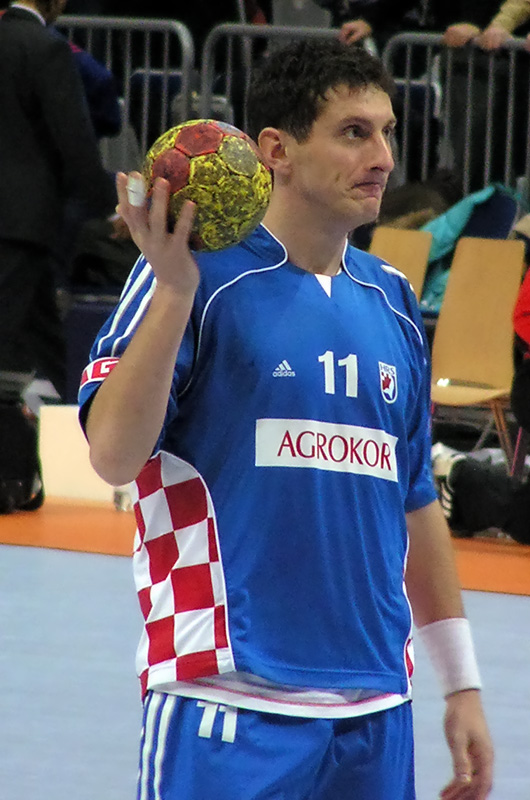
Džomba at the 2007 World Championship in Denmark

The next stop for Džomba was the 2005 World Championship in Tunisia where Croatia were playing as defending champions. Croatia passed their Group Stage undefeated with wins against Argentina (36:23), Japan (25:34), Australia (38:18), Spain (31:33) and Sweden (28:27). During the second round Croatia had their first loss, against Norway (25:28). They won the next two matches against Germany (26:29) and Serbian and Montenegro (24:23). In the semi-finals Croatia defeated France 35:32. Croatia reached the final but lost to Spain 40:34. Džomba was voted best right wing of the tournament and was place in the all star team. He was also the third top scorer with 62 goals. Next came the 2006 European Championship in Switzerland. Džomba hurt his ligaments at a training in Karlovac but he was very optimistic about his injury before the tournament. Džomba didn't show much of a performance at the tournament. In the semi-final match against France Džomba scored 10 goals in painful loss for Croatia. They finished in fourth place losing the third place match to Denmark (32:27).

From 24 to 29 October 2006, Croatia competed at the Statoil World Cup. They won the tournament beating Tunisia in the final. The match was a draw of 29:29 going in to penalties Džomba scored the first penalty and Croatia won 4:2.

Džomba's next tournament was the 2007 World Championship. Croatia got to the quarter-finals and lost to France 18:21. They won the 5th place match against Spain. Džomba's performances weren't great and he was criticized throughout the media for it. Though his performances at the World Championship weren't great 2007 was a special year for Džomba as he had broken Patrik Ćavar's record for the most goals scored for the national team.

Before the 2008 European Championship it was announced that Džomba would not be going to Norway because he was injured. In the end Džomba came and played solidly. Croatia lost to Denmark 24:20 in the final match received his first silver medal of this competition.

Džomba retired from the national team in 2008 after the 2008 Summer Olympics where they placed 4th. Even though he retired Lino Červar put his name up on the roster for the 2009 World Championship. Džomba wanted to have his farewell with the national team and the fans at the 2009 World Championship in Croatia but could not play due to injury on his right leg.

Džomba appeared 185 times and scored 719 goals for the national team of Croatia.

== Statistics ==
| Goals | Apps | Competition |
|---|---|---|
| 512 | 121 | EHF Champions League |
| 40 | 7 | EHF Champions Trophy |
| 138 | 26 | Polish Superliga |

== Retirement ==
Since his retirement, Džomba has stayed involved in handball especially with Zamet and its youth academy. Džomba spent some time playing for football club Pomorac veterans team.

In 2012, he appeared in a documentary film of titled Riječki Olimpijci. The documentary directed by Vanja Vinković focuses on the Olympic medalists of the city of Rijeka and their Olympic success from 1924 to 2012.

As of March 2016, Džomba is the president of the Handball Association of Primorje-Gorski Kotar, taking the position from his former coach Darko Dunato.

On 12 April 2016, Džomba took part in a charity football match on Stadion Rujevica. It was a pre match for the HNK Rijeka all stars and cult celebrities. Džomba's celebrity side lost 6:3 to ex footballers such as Goran Vlaović, Admir Hasančić and Boško Balaban.

On 14 December, he was named on the executive board of sports in Rijeka Sports Federation for handball.

== TV personality ==
Džomba is a well-known TV personality in Croatia. Besides sports-related TV shows and commercials, he appeared in the first episode of Najveći hrvatski misteriji with colleague Igor Vori in 2009. The same year, he was prank called by comedians Davor Jurkotić and Mario Batifjaka on the show Bijele udovice.

Džomba was a studio commentator for the 2015 World Championship with Blaženko Lacković and for the 2016 European Championship with Goran Šprem on Croatian channel RTL.

During December 2016 Džomba guest starred in U zdrav mozak Celebrity prank calling friends with host Davor Jurkotić.

== Personal life ==
Džomba has been married to former television host Belma Hodžić since 2010. They have two daughters.

== Honours ==
=== Club ===
RK Zamet

- Croatian First B League:
  - Winner: 1996
- Croatian U-19 Championship:
  - Winner: 1996
- Croatian U-17 Championship:
  - Third: 1994

RK Zagreb

- Croatian Premier League:
  - Winner: 1997, 1998, 1999, 2000, 2001, 2008, 2009, 2010
- Croatian Cup:
  - Winner: 1997, 1998, 1999, 2000 2008, 2009, 2010
- EHF Champions League:
  - Finalist: 1997, 1998, 1999
- EHF Champions Trophy:
  - Finalist: 1998

KC Veszprém

- Hungarian First League:
  - Winner: 2002, 2003, 2004
- Hungarian Cup:
  - Winner: 2002, 2003, 2004
- EHF Champions League:
  - Finalist: 2002
- EHF Champions Trophy:
  - Finalist: 2002

Ciudad Real

- Liga ASOBAL:
  - Winner: 2007
  - Runner-up:2005, 2006
- Copa del Rey:
  - Finalist: 2006
- ASOBAL Cup:
  - Winner: 2005, 2006, 2007
- Supercopa ASOBAL:
  - Winner: 2005
- EHF Champions League:
  - Winner: 2006
  - Finalist: 2005
- EHF Champions Trophy:
  - Winner: 2005, 2006
- IHF Super Globe:
  - Winner: 2007

=== International ===
Major tournaments

- Olympic Games:
  - Winner: 2004
- World Championship:
  - Winner: 2003
  - Finalist: 2005
- European Championship:
  - Finalist: 2008

Minor tournaments

- Statoil World Cup:
  - Winner: 2006
- Super Cup :
  - Finalist: 1999
- Mediterranean Games:
  - Winner: 1997, 2001

Friendly tournaments

- Paris tournament:
  - Winner: 1997
- Olympic qualification tournament:
  - Finalist: 1999
- Croatia Cup:
  - Winner: 2000, 2005, 2006, 2007,
- Getman Cup:
  - Finalist: 2002
- Elfag Cup:
  - Finalist: 2002
- Pre-World Championship tournament:
  - Winner: 2003

=== Individual ===
- Top goalscorer at Croatian U-19 Championship 1996
- Best player at Croatian U-19 Championship 1996
- 2002–03 EHF Champions League top goalscorer – 67 goals
- Best right wing at 2003 World Championship
- Athletes of the Year - Most Successful Men's Team by: Sportske novosti & Croatian Olympic Committee: 2003 and 2004
- Top goalscorer at 2004 European Championship – 46 goals
- Best right wing at 2004 Summer Olympics
- 2nd top goalscorer at 2004 Summer Olympics – 55 goals
- 2004 Summer Olympics all star team
- Franjo Bučar State Award for Sport – 2004
- IHF World Player of the Year by IHF: 2004 (third) and 2005 (third).
- Best right wing in Spain: 2005, 2006
- 3rd top goalscorer at 2005 World Championship – 62 goals
- Best right wing at 2005 World Championship
- Croatian handball player of the year by CHF & Sportske novosti – 2005
- ASOBAL Cup top goalscorer – 2006
- 2005–06 EHF Champions League 3rd top goalscorer – 73 goals
- 2006 EHF Champions Trophy top goalscorer – 17 goals
- 11th greatest handball player of the decade by SVT – 2009
- Best right wing in the history of EHF Champions League between 1993 and 2013
- Plaque with names of Rijeka's Olympic medalists - 2014
- RK Zamet hall of fame – 2015

=== Records ===
- All-time goalscorer of Croatia – 719 goals

=== Orders ===
- Order of Danica Hrvatska with face of Franjo Bučar – 2004

== Bibliography ==
- Petar Orgulić – 50 godina rukometa u Rijeci (2004), Adriapublic
- Mišo Cvijanović, Igor Duvnjak, Tonko Kraljić & Orlando Rivetti – 4 ASA (2007), Adriapublic
