= Liga ASOBAL 2008–09 =

Liga ASOBAL 2008–09 season (known as the SabadellAtlántico ASOBAL for sponsorship reasons) is the 19th since its establishment. Ciudad Real are the defending champions, having won their 3rd La Liga title in the previous season. The campaign began on Saturday, 13 September 2008. The league is originally scheduled to end on 16 May 2009. A total of 16 teams contest the league, 14 of which have already contested in the 2007–08 season, and two of which have been promoted from the División de Honor B. In addition, a new match ball - the SELECT Super Five- is serving as the official ball for all matches.

== Promotion and relegation ==
Teams promoted from 2007–08 División de Honor B de Balonmano

- Alcobendas
- Cuenca 2016

Teams relegated to 2007–08 División de Honor B de Balonmano

- Teka Cantabria
- Algeciras

== Team information ==
Teams playing in Liga ASOBAL 2008-2009

| Team | Venue | Capacity |
|---|---|---|
| BM Alcobendas | Severo Ochoa | 3,000 |
| Antequera 2010 | Fernando Argüelles | 2,575 |
| JD Arrate | Polideportivo Ipurua | 3,500 |
| CAI BM Aragón | Príncipe Felipe | 12,000 |
| FC Barcelona | Palau Blaugrana | 8,250 |
| Ciudad Real | Quijote Arena | 5,107 |
| Cuenca 2016 | El Sargal | 1,900 |
| Fraikin Granollers | Palau D'Esports | 6,500 |
| Naturhouse La Rioja | Palacio de los Deportes | 3,851 |
| Keymare Almería | Mpal. Rafael Florido | 2,000 |
| Octavio Pilotes Posada | As Travesas | 3,500 |
| Pevafersa Valladolid | Huerta del Rey | 3,500 |
| Portland San Antonio | Pabellón Universitario | 3,000 |
| Reale Ademar León | Palacio Municipal | 6,000 |
| SD Teucro | Pavillón Municipal | 3,500 |
| CB Torrevieja | Palacio de los Deportes | 4,500 |

- Last updated: 10 May 2009

== League table ==
| | Team | P | W | D | L | G+ | G− | Dif | Pts |
|---|---|---|---|---|---|---|---|---|---|
| 1 | Ciudad Real | 30 | 28 | 0 | 2 | 1010 | 764 | 246 | 56 |
| 2 | Barcelona Borges | 30 | 26 | 0 | 4 | 963 | 777 | 186 | 52 |
| 3 | Pevafersa Valladolid | 30 | 22 | 2 | 6 | 948 | 863 | 85 | 46 |
| 4 | Portland San Antonio | 30 | 21 | 2 | 7 | 904 | 859 | 45 | 44 |
| 5 | Reale Ademar | 30 | 20 | 2 | 8 | 904 | 824 | 80 | 42 |
| 6 | Fraikin Granollers | 30 | 16 | 2 | 12 | 910 | 853 | 57 | 34 |
| 7 | Naturhouse La Rioja | 30 | 11 | 8 | 11 | 865 | 889 | -24 | 30 |
| 8 | CAI BM Aragón | 30 | 11 | 5 | 14 | 875 | 882 | -7 | 27 |
| 9 | Octavio Pilotes Posada | 30 | 12 | 2 | 16 | 866 | 900 | -34 | 26 |
| 10 | Antequera 2010 | 30 | 10 | 6 | 14 | 803 | 823 | -20 | 26 |
| 11 | Arrate | 30 | 8 | 5 | 17 | 808 | 849 | -41 | 21 |
| 12 | Torrevieja | 30 | 8 | 5 | 17 | 841 | 885 | -44 | 21 |
| 13 | Cuenca 2016 | 30 | 8 | 4 | 18 | 849 | 941 | -92 | 20 |
| 14 | Alcobendas | 30 | 7 | 1 | 22 | 788 | 867 | -79 | 15 |
| 15 | Teucro | 30 | 6 | 3 | 21 | 813 | 933 | -120 | 15 |
| 16 | Keymare Almería | 30 | 2 | 1 | 27 | 728 | 966 | -238 | 5 |

| EHF Champions League |
| EHF Cup Winners' Cup |
| EHF Cup |
| Relegated to División de Honor B |

2008–09 Liga ASOBAL winners
(Castilla–La Mancha)
Ciudad Real
Fourth title

== Teams by autonomous community ==
| | Autonomous community | Number of teams | Teams |
|---|---|---|---|
| 1 | Andalusia | 2 | Antequera 2010 and Keymare Almería |
| 1 | Castile and León | 2 | Reale Ademar and Pevafersa Valladolid |
| 1 | Castile-La Mancha | 2 | Cuenca 2016 and Ciudad Real |
| 1 | Catalonia | 2 | Fraikin Granollers and Barcelona Borges |
| 1 | Galicia | 2 | Octavio Pilotes Posada and Teucro |
| 6 | Aragon | 1 | CAI BM Aragón |
| 6 | Basque Country | 1 | Arrate |
| 6 | La Rioja | 1 | Naturhouse La Rioja |
| 6 | Madrid | 1 | Alcobendas |
| 6 | Navarre | 1 | Portland San Antonio |
| 6 | Valencia | 1 | Torrevieja |

== Top goal scorers ==
- As day 30 of 30

| Player | Goals | Team |
|---|---|---|
| (Serbia) Marko Ćuruvija | 209 | Teucro |
| (Norway) Håvard Tvedten | 182 | Pervafersa Valladolid |
| (Bosnia and Herzegovina) Nikola Prce | 181 | Pilotes Posada |
| (Slovakia) Martin Straňovský | 174 | Reale Ademar |
| (Bosnia and Herzegovina) Vukašin Stojanović | 164 | Naturhouse La Rioja |
| (Spain) Joan Cañellas | 158 | Fraikin Granollers |
| (Serbia) Dobrivoje Marković | 155 | Cuenca 2016 |
| (Poland) Dawid Nilsson | 149 | Cuenca 2016 |
| (Spain) Eduardo Gurbindo | 145 | Torrevieja |
| (Montenegro) Aleksandar Svitlica | 144 | Fraikin Granollers |

== Top goalkeepers ==
- As day 30 of 30

| Player | Saves | Shots | Team |
|---|---|---|---|
| (Serbia) Radivoje Ristanović | 378 | 1195 | Teucro |
| (Spain) Iñaki Malumbres | 343 | 1083 | Arrate |
| (Spain) José Manuel Sierra | 309 | 950 | Pevafersa Valladolid |
| (Spain) Jorge Martínez | 307 | 930 | Antequera 2010 |
| (Bosnia and Herzegovina) Danijel Šarić | 307 | 912 | Portland San Antonio |
| (Sweden) Fredrik Ohlander | 292 | 911 | Fraikin Granollers |
| (Montenegro) Rade Mijatović | 287 | 938 | Alcobendas |
| (Spain) Javier Díaz | 282 | 1002 | Pilotes Posada |
| (Spain) Pablo Hernández | 274 | 853 | CAI BM Aragón |
| (Spain) Hector Tomás | 256 | 918 | Keymare Almería |
