= Jonas Källman =

Swedish handball player (born 1981)

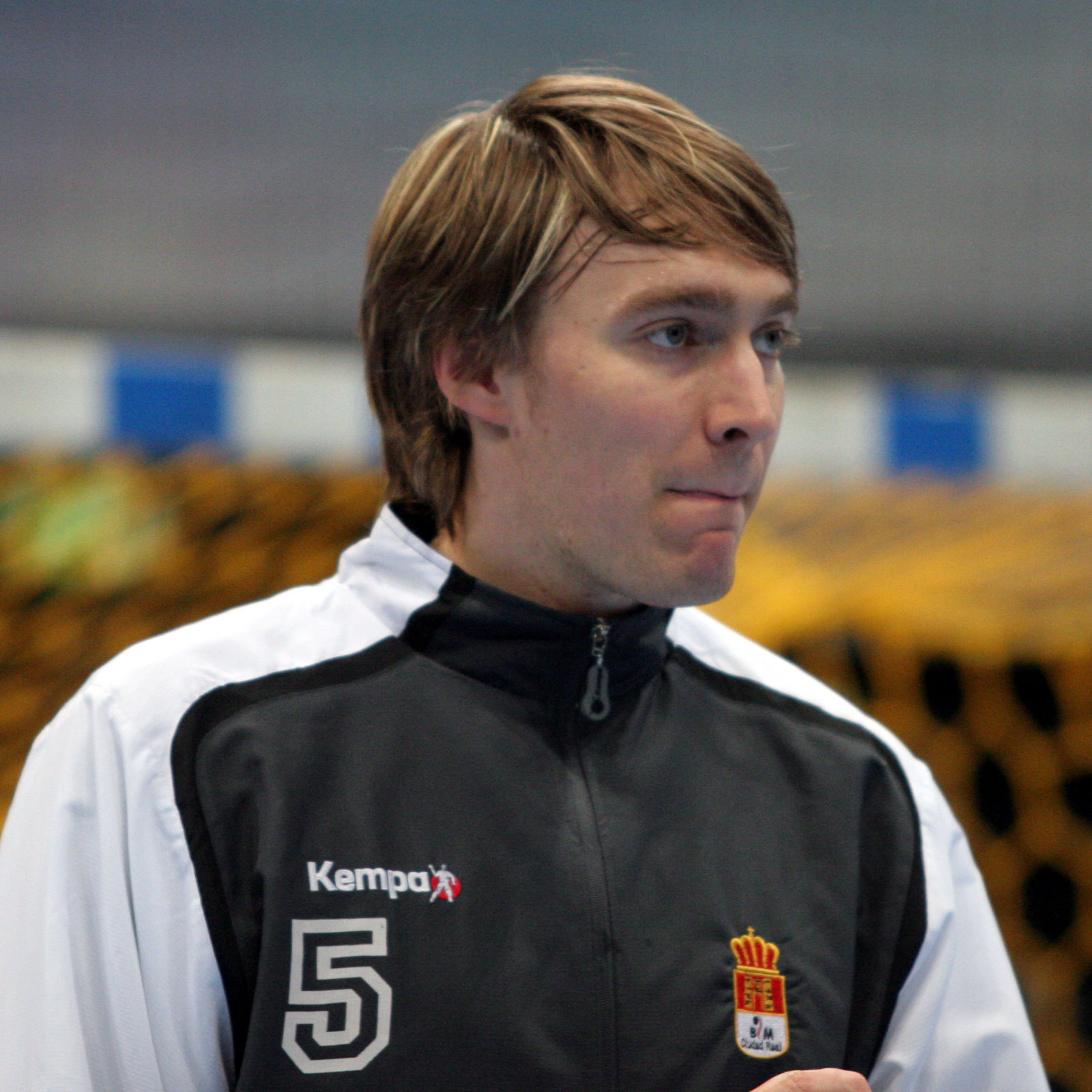

Personal information
- Nationality: Swedish
- Born: 17 July 1981 (age 45) Växjö, Sweden
- Height: 2.00 m (6 ft 7 in)

Sport
- Sport: Handball
- Position: Left wing

Senior clubs
- Years: Team
- 2000–2002: IFK Skovde
- 2002–2011: BM Ciudad Real
- 2011–2013: Atlético Madrid
- 2013–2014: IFK Skovde
- 2014–2021: SC Pick Szeged
- 2021–2023: S.L. Benfica
National team
Years	Team	Apps	(Gls)
2001–2017	Sweden	222	(646)

Teams managed
- 2024–: OTP Bank-Pick Szeged (assistant)
Medal record
Olympic Games
Silver medal – second place	2012 London	Team

Jonas Källman (born 17 July 1981) is a Swedish handball coach and former player. He was named Swedish Player of the Year in 2009.

== Honours and awards ==
=== BM Ciudad Real ===
- Liga ASOBAL 2003–2004, 2006–2007, 2007–2008, 2008–2009, 2009–2010
- Runner-up Liga ASOBAL 2004–2005, 2005–2006
- Copa del Rey 2002–2003, 2007–2008
- Runner-up Copa del Rey 2005–2006, 2008–2009
- Copa ASOBAL 2003–2004, 2004–2005, 2005–2006, 2006–2007, 2007–2008, 2010–2011
- Supercopa de España 2004–2005, 2007–2008, 2010–2011
- Runner-up Supercopa de España 2008–2009, 2009–2010
- EHF Champions League 2005–2006, 2007–2008, 2008–2009
- Runner-up EHF Champions League 2004–2005
- EHF Men's Champions Trophy 2005–2006, 2006–2007, 2008–2009

=== BM Atlético de Madrid ===
- Supercopa de España: 2011–12
- Runner-up Supercopa de España: 2012–13
- Copa del Rey: 2011–12, 2012–13
- Runner-up Liga ASOBAL: 2011–12, 2012–13
- Runner-up EHF Champions League: 2011–12
- Runner-up Copa ASOBAL: 2013
- IHF Super Globe: 2012

=== MOL-Pick Szeged ===
- K&H Férfi Kézilabda Liga: 2017–18, 2020–21
- Magyar Kézilabdakupa: 2018–19
- Runner-up K&H Férfi Kézilabda Liga: 2014–15, 2015–16, 2016–17, 2018–19
- Runner-up Magyar Kézilabdakupa: 2014–15, 2015–16, 2016–17, 2017–18, 2020–21
- EHF Cup: 2013–14

=== S.L. Benfica ===
- EHF European League: 2021–22

=== National team ===
- 3rd Men's Junior World Handball Championship 2001
- Runner-up Olympic Games 2012
