= Josep Masachs =

Spanish handball player (born 1983)

Josep Masachs Gelma
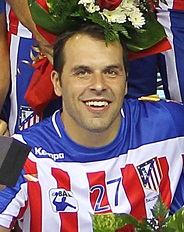

Personal information
- Full name: Josep Masachs Gelma
- Nationality: (Spain) Spanish
- Born: 4 July 1983 (age 43) Sant Antoni de Vilamajor, Spain
- Height: 1.81 m (5 ft 11 in)

Sport
- Sport: Handball
- Position: Right Wing
- Current club: Retired

Senior clubs
- Years: Team
- –2006: BM Granollers
- 2006–2008: CB Ciudad de Logroño
- 2008: BM Ciudad Real
- 2008–2009: SDC San Antonio
- 2009–2010: Pilotes Posada
- 2010–2012: BM Aragón
- 2012–2013: BM Atlético Madrid
- 2013–2014: Naturhouse La Rioja
- 2014–2016: Știința Dedeman Bacău

Josep Masachs Gelma (born 4 July 1983 in Sant Antoni de Vilamajor) is a Spanish former handballer who last played for Știința Municipal Dedeman Bacău in the Romanian Liga Naţională.

== Achievements ==
- Liga ASOBAL:
  - Winner: 2008
- Copa del Rey:
  - Winner: 2008, 2013
- Copa ASOBAL:
  - Winner: 2008
- EHF Champions League:
  - Winner: 2008
- IHF Super Globe:
  - Winner: 2012
