= 2002 Intercontinental Handball Cup =

Tournament details
- Host country: Russia
- City: Moscow
- Venue: 1 (in 1 host city)
- Dates: 25 – 29 June
- Teams: 5

Final positions
- Champions: Russia
- Runners-up: Sweden
- Third place: Argentina
- Fourth place: Algeria

Tournament statistics
- Matches played: 10
- Attendance: 490 (49 per match)
- Top scorer: (Algeria) Elhadi Biloum (23 goals)

The 2002 Intercontinental Handball Cup was the 3rd edition and was hosted for the first time in Russia from 25 to 29 June 2002.

== Qualification ==
Qualified teams are:

Country	Qualified as	Qualified on	Previous appearances
Russia	Host		0 (debut)
Argentina	Winner of 2000 Pan American Championship	28 May 2000	0 (debut)
Sweden	Winner of 2002 European Championship	3 February 2002	1 (2000)
Saudi Arabia	Third of 2002 Asian Championship	19 February 2002	1 (2000)
Algeria	Runners-up of 2002 African Championship	28 April 2002	1 (1998)

== Table ==
Pos	Team	Pld	W	D	L	GF	GA	GD	Pts
1	Russia (H)	4	4	0	0	117	88	+29	8
2	Sweden	4	3	0	1	103	90	+13	6
3	Argentina	4	2	0	2	91	88	+3	4
4	Algeria	4	1	0	3	94	105	−11	2
5	Saudi Arabia	4	0	0	4	85	119	−34	0

Source: IHF
Rules for classification: 1) points; 2) points in the games between teams in question; 3) goal difference in the games between teams in question; 4) number of goals scored in the games between teams in question; 5) goal difference; 6) number of goals scored.
(H) Hosts

== Games ==
All times are local (UTC+3)

25 June 2002; 17:00	Sweden	21-20	Argentina	Luzhniki Palace of Sports, Moscow
25 June 2002; 17:00		(10-11)		Luzhniki Palace of Sports, Moscow

25 June 2002; 19:30	Russia	34-19	Saudi Arabia	Luzhniki Palace of Sports, Moscow
25 June 2002; 19:30		(20-10)		Luzhniki Palace of Sports, Moscow

26 June 2002; 17:00	Argentina	22-20	Algeria	Luzhniki Palace of Sports, Moscow
26 June 2002; 17:00		(11-17)		Luzhniki Palace of Sports, Moscow

26 June 2002; 19:00	Saudi Arabia	20-32	Sweden	Luzhniki Palace of Sports, Moscow
26 June 2002; 19:00		(10-16)		Luzhniki Palace of Sports, Moscow

27 June 2002; 17:00	Argentina	24-20	Saudi Arabia	Luzhniki Palace of Sports, Moscow
27 June 2002; 17:00		(13-9)		Luzhniki Palace of Sports, Moscow

27 June 2002; 19:00	Algeria	20-31	Russia	Luzhniki Palace of Sports, Moscow
27 June 2002; 19:00		(11-13)		Luzhniki Palace of Sports, Moscow

28 June 2002; 17:00	Algeria	29-26	Saudi Arabia	Luzhniki Palace of Sports, Moscow
28 June 2002; 17:00		(11-14)		Luzhniki Palace of Sports, Moscow

28 June 2002; 19:00	Russia	25-24	Sweden	Luzhniki Palace of Sports, Moscow; Attendance: 1050; Referees: M. Baum et M. Goralczyk (POL)
28 June 2002; 19:00	Lavrov, Ojered - Ivanov (3), Koksharov (4, (suspension) ), Egorov (1, (suspension) ), Krivoshlykov (8, (yellow card) ), Ignatov (1, (yellow card) ), Gritsenko, Torgovanov (3, (yellow card) (suspension) ), Kamanin (1, (suspension) ), Rastvortsev (3), Miagkov (1, (suspension) ), Gorpishin, Safonov ( (suspension) (suspension) )	(15-13)	Ohlander, M. Andersson - Johansson (3), Larholm (1, (yellow card) ), Arrhenius (1, (yellow card) (suspension) ), Lindberg, Svensson, Hansen, Hammarstrand (2), Ahlm (4 (suspension) (suspension) (suspension) (red card) ), K. Andersson (4), Doder, Källman (4, (yellow card) (suspension) ), Lennartsson (5, (suspension) )	Luzhniki Palace of Sports, Moscow; Attendance: 1050; Referees: M. Baum et M. Goralczyk (POL)
28 June 2002; 19:00	3× (yellow card) 7× (suspension)	Report	3× (yellow card) 6× (suspension) 1× (red card)	Luzhniki Palace of Sports, Moscow; Attendance: 1050; Referees: M. Baum et M. Goralczyk (POL)

29 June 2002; 15:00	Sweden	26-25	Algeria	Luzhniki Palace of Sports, Moscow
29 June 2002; 15:00		(14-11)		Luzhniki Palace of Sports, Moscow

29 June 2002; 17:00	Russia	27-25	Argentina	Luzhniki Palace of Sports, Moscow
29 June 2002; 17:00		(11-9)		Luzhniki Palace of Sports, Moscow

== All-star Team ==
Position	Player
Goalkeeper	(Argentina) Christian Canzoniero
Left wing	(Saudi Arabia) Hussain Alakwan
Left back	(Russia) Alexey Rastvortsev
Centre back	(Russia) Vitali Ivanov
Right back	(Argentina) Eric Gull
Right wing	(Sweden) Jan Lennartsson
Pivot	(Russia) Dmitri Torgovanov
