= Atlético Madrid BM =

Spanish handball club

Atlético Madrid
- Full name: Balonmano Atlético Madrid
- Founded: 1951
- Dissolved: 1994
- Arena: Antonio Magariños, Madrid, Spain
- Capacity: 3,000
- League: Liga ASOBAL
- 1993–94: Liga ASOBAL, 6th
Home	Away

Atlético Madrid Balonmano was a handball team that was part of the Atlético sports organization.

== History ==
Created in the early 1950s, it won 11 Spanish Leagues and 10 Spanish Cups between 1952 and 1987, and reached the final of the 1984-85 European Cup and the 1986-87 EHF Cup; they lost both to, respectively, Metaloplastika Šabac and Granitas Kaunas.

Jesús Gil disbanded the team in 1992, but it still competed as Atlético Madrid Alcobendas for two more seasons under the management of some stockholders before finally disappearing in 1994.

Los Colchoneros welcomed handball back into their organization in 2011, as they became official sponsors of BM Neptuno, formerly known as BM Ciudad Real, which folded and relocated to Madrid for financial reasons. The new team started off quite successfully, beating FC Barcelona Handbol 33–26 in the Supercup match in August 2011.

== Trophies ==
- Liga ASOBAL:
  - Champions: (11). 1951–52, 1953–54, 1961–62, 1962–63, 1963–64, 1964–65, 1978–79, 1980–81, 1982–83, 1983–84, 1984–85.
  - Runners-Up: (13). 1955–56, 1958–59, 1960–61, 1965–66, 1966–67, 1969–70, 1971–72, 1973–74, 1975–76, 1976–77, 1977–78, 1981–82, 1985–86.
- Copa del Rey:
  - Champions: (10). 1962, 1963, 1966, 1967, 1968, 1978, 1979, 1981, 1982, 1987.
  - Runners-Up: (7). 1970, 1973, 1976, 1980, 1984, 1985, 1991.
- Supercopa ASOBAL:
  - Champions: (2). 1986, 1988.
- EHF Champions League
  - Runners-Up: (1). 1984–85.
- EHF Cup
  - Runners-Up: (1). 1986–87.
- Double

Winners (4): 1961–62, 1962–63, 1978–79, 1980–81.

== Home arenas ==
City	Arena's name	Term
Madrid	Polideportivo Magariños	–1992
Alcobendas	Pabellón Municipal de Alcobendas	1992–1994

== Notable players ==
- (Spain) Alberto Urdiales
- (Spain) Cecilio Alonso
- (Spain) José Javier Hombrados
- (Spain) Mateo Garralda
- (Spain) "Papitu"
- (Spain) Lorenzo Rico
- (Spain) Javier Reino
- (Spain) Ángel Hermida
- (Spain) Ricardo Marín
- (Sweden) Tomas Svensson
- (Sweden) Per Carlén
- (Socialist Federal Republic of Yugoslavia) Veselin Vuković
- (Iceland) Sigurður Sveinsson
- (Federal Republic of Yugoslavia) Igor Butulija
- (Federal Republic of Yugoslavia) Dejan Perić
- (Federal Republic of Yugoslavia) Dragan Škrbić
- (Denmark) Mikael Strøm
- (Hungary) Tibor Vozar
- (Romania) Neculai Vasilcă
- (Russia) Igor Vasilev
- (United States) Steven Goss
- (Bosnia and Herzegovina) Adnan Šabanović
- (Switzerland) Norwin Platzer

== Notables coaches ==
- Jordi Álvaro
- Juan de Dios Román
- Domingo Bárcenas
- Francisco Parrilla

== See also ==
- Atlético Madrid
- BM Neptuno
