= Alberto Val =

Spanish handball player (born 1986)

Personal information
- Full name: Alberto Val Sancho
- Born: 6 March 1986 (age 40) Zaragoza, Spain
- Height: 2.08 m (6 ft 10 in)

Sport
- Sport: Handball
- Position: Defender; Line player
- Current club: Balonmano Casetas
- Number: 06

Senior clubs
- Years: Team
- 2003–2005: FC Barcelona-Cifec
- 2005–2006: CAI BM. Aragon
- 2006–2010: CB Torrevieja
- 2010–2012: Caja3 BM. Aragon
- 2012–2013: Constanța
- 2013–2015: BM Aragón
- 2015–: CB Ciudad de Logroño

Alberto Val (born 6 March 1986, Zaragoza) is a Spanish handballer who plays for CB Ciudad de Logroño.

== Achievements ==
- EHF Champions League:
  - Winner: 2005
- EHF Champions Trophy:
  - Winner: 2003
- EHF Cup Winners' Cup:
  - Semifinalist: 2012
- Liga Națională:
  - Winner: 2013
- Cupa României:
  - Winner: 2013
- Supercopa ASOBAL:
  - Winner: 2004
- King's Cup:
  - Winner: 2004
