= Liga ASOBAL 2006–07 =

Liga ASOBAL 2006–07 season was the 17th since its establishment. A total of 16 teams competed this season for the championship.

== Competition format ==
The competition was played in a round-robin format, through 30 rounds. The team with most points earned wins the championship. The last two teams were relegated.

== Overall standing ==
	Team	P	W	D	L	G+	G−	Dif	Pts
1	Ciudad Real	30	28	1	1	988	797	191	57
2	Portland San Antonio	30	25	3	2	931	772	159	53
3	Caja España Ademar	30	23	3	4	937	819	118	49
4	Barcelona-Cifec	30	22	2	6	966	845	121	46
5	Valladolid	30	17	5	8	931	869	62	39
6	CAI BM Aragón	30	17	0	13	907	891	16	34
7	Fraikin Granollers	30	12	1	17	787	848	-61	25
8	Arrate	30	11	1	18	837	855	-18	23
9	Keymare Almería	30	8	6	16	778	840	-62	22
10	Torrevieja	30	8	5	17	798	891	-93	21
11	Algeciras	30	8	4	18	842	876	-34	20
12	Altea	30	9	2	19	807	860	-53	20
13	Antequera	30	8	4	18	813	857	-44	20
14	Darien Logroño	30	7	4	19	781	865	-84	18
15	Teka Cantabria	30	7	3	20	822	923	-101	17
16	Bidasoa Irún	30	7	2	21	770	887	-117	16

- BM Altea was relegated due to financial troubles. Thus, Teka Cantabria remained in Liga ASOBAL.

EHF Champions League
EHF Cup Winners' Cup
EHF Cup
relegated

2006–07 Liga ASOBAL winners
(Castilla–La Mancha)
Ciudad Real
Second title

=== Conclusions ===
- BM Ciudad Real -- EHF Champions League and Liga ASOBAL Champion
- Portland San Antonio -- EHF Champions League
- Caja España Ademar León -- EHF Champions League
- FC Barcelona Handbol -- EHF Champions League
- BM Valladolid -- EHF Cup Winner's Cup
- CAI BM Aragón -- EHF Cup
- BM Granollers -- EHF Cup
- Teka Cantabria—Relegated to División de Honor B
- Bidasoa Irún—Relegated to División de Honor B

== Top goal scorers ==
Player	Goals	Team
(Serbia) Davor Čutura	221	Arrate
(Portugal) Eduardo Coelho	200	Algeciras
(Norway) Håvard Tvedten	192	Darien Logroño
(Montenegro) Alen Muratović	189	Valladolid
(Argentina) Eric Gull	181	Valladolid
(Spain) Iker Romero	172	Barcelona Cifec
(Spain) Juanín García	161	Barcelona Cifec
(Slovenia) Renato Vugrinec	153	Portland San Antonio
(Spain) Cristian Malmagro	147	Fraikin Granollers
(Serbia) Marko Krivokapić	140	Fraikin Granollers

== Top goalkeepers ==
Player	Catches	Shots	Team
(Spain) Iñaki Malumbres	315	1009	Arrate
(Spain) Jorge Martínez	310	992	Teka Cantabria
(Bosnia and Herzegovina) Danijel Šarić	303	826	Caja España Ademar
(Spain) Vicente Álamo	286	881	Fraikin Granollers
(Spain) Diego Moyano	275	828	Torrevieja
(Norway) Ole Everik	251	830	Bidasoa Irún
(Spain) José Manuel Sierra	247	827	Valladolid
(Denmark) Kasper Hvidt	223	648	Portland San Antonio
(Greece) Konstantinos Tsilimparis	223	693	Algeciras
(Serbia) Árpád Sterbik	222	610	Ciudad Real
(Spain) José Javier Hombrados	218	595	Ciudad Real
