= Liga ASOBAL 2007–08 =

Liga ASOBAL 2007–08 season was the 18th since its establishment. A total of 16 teams competed this season for the championship.

== Competition format ==
The competition was played in a round-robin format, through 30 rounds. The team with most points earned wins the championship. The last two teams were relegated.

== Overall standing ==
	Team	P	W	D	L	G+	G−	Dif	Pts
1	Ciudad Real	30	26	1	3	964	776	198	53
2	Barcelona	30	25	1	4	1021	818	203	51
3	Ademar León	30	20	6	4	850	778	72	46
4	Portland San Antonio	30	21	3	6	966	858	108	45
5	Valladolid	30	19	1	10	933	858	75	39
6	CAI BM Aragón	30	17	2	11	909	856	53	36
7	Arrate	30	14	3	13	831	843	-12	31
8	Tabisam Torrevieja	30	11	2	17	792	835	-43	24
9	Antequera	30	11	2	17	785	836	-51	24
10	Teucro	30	11	2	17	784	898	-114	24
11	Pilotes Posada	30	7	6	17	803	859	-56	20
12	Naturhouse La Rioja	30	8	3	19	841	881	-40	19
12	Fraikin Granollers	30	9	1	20	815	868	-53	19
14	Teka Cantabria	30	8	1	21	777	881	-104	17
15	Keymare Almería	30	7	2	21	789	871	-82	16
16	Algeciras	30	6	4	20	869	1023	-154	16

- Teka Cantabria was relegated due to financial troubles. Thus, Keymare Almería remained in Liga ASOBAL.

EHF Champions League
EHF Cup Winners' Cup
EHF Cup
relegated

2007–08 Liga ASOBAL winners
(Castilla–La Mancha)
Ciudad Real
Third title

=== Conclusions ===
- BM Ciudad Real -- EHF Champions League and Liga ASOBAL Champion
- FC Barcelona Handbol -- EHF Champions League
- CB Ademar León -- EHF Champions League
- Portland San Antonio -- EHF Champions League
- BM Valladolid -- EHF Cup Winner's Cup
- CAI BM Aragón -- EHF Cup
- JD Arrate -- EHF Cup
- Algeciras BM—Relegated to División de Honor B
- Keymare Almería—Relegated to División de Honor B

== Top goal scorers ==
- As day 30 of 30

Player	Goals	Team
(Spain) Iker Romero	197	Barcelona
(Montenegro) Alen Muratović	174	Valladolid
(Norway) Håvard Tvedten	174	Naturhouse La Rioja
(Slovenia) Siarhei Rutenka	171	Ciudad Real
(Spain) Carlos Ruesga	170	Portland San Antonio
(Spain) Rául Campos	166	Fraikin Granollers
(Croatia) Ivan Čupić	164	Pilotes Posada
(Spain) Valero Rivera	163	Algeciras
(Poland) Mariusz Jurkiewicz	154	Arrate
(Serbia) Dalibor Čutura	153	Arrate

== Top goalkeepers ==
- As day 30 of 30

Player	Saves	Shots	Team
(Spain) Iñaki Malumbres	398	1150	Arrate
(Spain) José Manuel Sierra	374	1078	Arrate
(Croatia) Vladimir Bozić	356	1060	Teucro
(Serbia) Dimitrije Pejanović	346	1008	Tabisam Torrevieja
(Bosnia and Herzegovina) Danijel Šarić	284	792	Ademar León
(Spain) Vicente Álamo	262	853	Fraikin Granollers
(Spain) Pablo Hernández	251	752	CAI BM Aragón
(Denmark) Kasper Hvidt	245	710	Barcelona
(Sweden) Tomas Svensson	244	714	Portland San Antonio
(Spain) Javier Díaz	241	753	Pilotes Posada
