= 2007 Copa del Rey de Balonmano =

Copa del Rey de Balonmano 2006-07

The 2007 edition of Copa del Rey de Balonmano was held in Altea, city of the autonomous community of Valencian Community. This tournament is disputed by the 8 first of the Liga ASOBAL when reach the half of the league.

== Quarter finals ==
7 March 2007:

(1) Portland San Antonio 25-30 (7) Algeciras BM: (19:00, CET) (Official Match Report)

(4) Caja España Ademar León 40-38 (5) BM Valladolid: (21:00, CET) (Official Match Report)

8 March 2007:

(2) BM Ciudad Real 26-32 (3) FC Barcelona Handbol: (19:00, CET) (Official Match Report)

(6) CAI BM Aragón 26-25 (11) BM Altea: (21:00, CET) (CET) (Official Match Report)

== Semifinals ==
10 March 2007:

(4) Caja España Ademar León 29-21 (7) Algeciras BM: (16:30, CET) (Official Match Report)

(3) FC Barcelona Handbol 34-29 (6) CAI BM Aragón: (19:00, CET) (Official Match Report)

== Final ==
(3) FC Barcelona Handbol 33-27 (4) Caja España Ademar León: (17:00, CET) (Official Match Report)

- Copa del Rey de Balonmano 2006/07 Champion: FC Barcelona Handbol.

== Television broadcasting ==
- TVE2 and Teledeporte.

== Organizer ==
- ASOBAL and the Ajuntament d'Altea.
