= Lorenzo Rico =

Spanish handball player (born 1962)

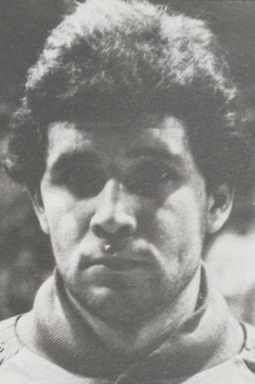
- Rico in 1986

Personal information
- Nationality: Spanish
- Born: 17 January 1962 (age 64) Madrid, Spain
- Height: 185 cm (73 in)

Sport
- Sport: Handball
- Position: Goalkeeper

Senior clubs
- Years: Team
- 1976-1987: Atlético Madrid BM
- 1987-1995: FC Barcelona
National team
Years	Team	Apps
–	Spain	245

Lorenzo Rico (born 17 January 1962) is a Spanish handball player. He competed at the 1984 Summer Olympics, the 1988 Summer Olympics and the 1992 Summer Olympics. He used to hold the record for most caps for the Spanish national team with 245, until he was overtaken by David Barrufet. He is in the Liga ASOBAL hall of fame.

At club level he played for Atlético Madrid BM from 1976 to 1987, where he one the Spanish Championship 5 times, as well as the Copa del Rey de Balonmano once. Then he played for FC Barcelona, where he also won the Spanish Championship 5 times, as well as the King's Cup 4 times and the Copa ASOBAL once. He also won the 1990-91 European Cup.
