= Mikael Strøm =

Danish handball player (born 1959)

Mikael Kisbye Strøm (née jensen born 23 June 1959) is a Danish former handball player who competed in the 1984 Summer Olympics.

In 1984 he finished fourth with the Denmark men's national handball team in the 1984 Olympic tournament. He played one match and scored three goals.

He played his club handball with Gladsaxe HG and Atlético Madrid BM. In 1985, he was runners-up of the European Cup and won the División de Honor.
