= BM Pedro Alonso Niño Moguer =

Spanish handball club

The BM Pedro Alonso Niño Moguer is a handball team Moguer (Andalusia), founded in 1972, currently plays in the National First step after the 09/10 Honor Division B. It is named in honor of the 15-century Spanish explorer Pedro Alonso Niño.

== See also ==
- José Manuel Sierra
