= 2008 Copa del Rey de Balonmano =

Copa del Rey de Balonmano 2007-08

The 2008 edition of Copa del Rey de Balonmano takes place in Zaragoza, city of the autonomous community of Aragon. This tournament is played by the 8 first of the Liga ASOBAL when reach the half of the league.

All matches will be played in Pabellón Príncipe Felipe with capacity of 8,300 seats.

== 2007-08 participants ==
- BM Ciudad Real
- FC Barcelona Handbol
- Portland San Antonio
- CB Ademar León
- CAI BM Aragón
- BM Valladolid
- JD Arrate
- BM Antequera

=== Quarter finals ===
16 April 2008:

(1) BM Ciudad Real 30-22 (8) CB Antequera: (19:00, CEST) (Official Match Report)

(3) CB Ademar León 26-34 (7) JD Arrate: (21:00, CEST) (Official Match Report)

17 April 2008:

(4) Portland San Antonio 40-30 (5) BM Valladolid: (19:00, CEST) (Official Match Report)

(2) FC Barcelona Handbol 37-34 (6) CAI BM Aragón: (21:00, CEST) (CET) (Official Match Report)

=== SemiFinals ===
18 April 2008:

(2) FC Barcelona Handbol 31-29 (4) Portland San Antonio: (18:00, CEST) (Official Match Report)

(1) BM Ciudad Real 34-31 (7) JD Arrate: (20:00, CEST) (Official Match Report)

== Final ==
19 April 2008:

(1) BM Ciudad Real 31-30 (2) FC Barcelona Handbol: (18:00, CEST) (Official Match Report)

- Copa del Rey de Balonmano 2007/08 Champion: BM Ciudad Real.

== Television Broadcasting ==
- TVE2
- Teledeporte.
- Aragón Televisión

== Organizer ==
- Liga ASOBAL
- Ayuntamiento de Zaragoza
- Gobierno de Aragón
- Zaragoza Deporte
- Expo Zaragoza 2008
