= BM Antequera =

Spanish handball club

Antequera
- Full name: Club Balonmano Antequera
- Founded: 1994
- Dissolved: June, 2012
- Arena: Fernando Argüelles, Antequera, Andalusia, Spain
- Capacity: 2,575
- 2011–12: Liga ASOBAL, 15th
Home	Away

Club Balonmano Antequera was a handball team based in Antequera, Andalusia. Its last season was 2011–12 in Liga ASOBAL finishing in 16th position at standings being consequently relegated.

The club was dissolved in June, 2012 due to an overall debt of €800,000.

== Season by season ==
Season	Tier	Division	Pos.	Notes
1994–95				
1995–96				
1996–97				
1997–98				
1998–99				
1999–00				
2000–01				merged with SAFA
2001–02	3	1ª Estatal	2	
2002–03	3	1ª Estatal	4	
2003–04	3	1ª Estatal	1	Promoted (bought place)

Season	Tier	Division	Pos.	Notes
2004–05	2	Honor B	14	
2005–06	2	Honor B	1	Promoted
2006–07	1	ASOBAL	13	
2007–08	1	ASOBAL	9	
2008–09	1	ASOBAL	10	
2009–10	1	ASOBAL	11	
2010–11	1	ASOBAL	10	
2011–12	1	ASOBAL	15	Disbanded

- 6 seasons in Liga ASOBAL

== Notable players ==
- (Denmark) Rune Ohm
- (Montenegro) Rade Mijatović
- (Slovenia) Zoran Lubej
- (Serbia) Rajko Prodanović
- (Serbia) Božidar Markićević
- (Spain) Rafael Baena
- (Montenegro) Igor Bakić
- (Montenegro) Obrad Radulović
- (Spain) Jordi Nuñez
- (Serbia) Danimir Ćurković
- (Bosnia and Herzegovina) Srđan Trivundža
- (Bosnia and Herzegovina) Branislav Obradović
- (North Macedonia) Lazo Majnov

== Stadium information ==
- Name: - Fernando Argüelles
- City: - Antequera
- Capacity: - 2,575 people
- Address: - C/ Antonio Mohedano, s/n
