= Intercontinental Handball Cup =

Sporting tournament

- Sport: handball
- First season: 1998
- Folded: 2002
- Organising body: International Handball Federation (IHF)
- No. of teams: 4 to 5
- Most titles: Algeria; Sweden; Russia (each 1 title)

The Intercontinental Handball Cup was a competition between the continental handball champions in the years which were not a World Men's Handball Championship and the host country.

== History ==
The idea of a Intercontinental Cup was first introduced in the 1980s but was delayed because of financial and temporal problems. In 1996 the IHF Congress created the IHF Men's Super Globe and the Intercontinental Handball Cup which takes place for the first time in 1998. After the third edition in 2002, the tournament was cancelled because of a fully packed calendar.

In 2024 the IHF announced they will bring back the tournament for 2025, but no competition has been organised that year.

== Tournaments ==
Year	Host	Final			3rd place match			Teams
Year	Host	Champions	Points	Runners-up	3rd place	Points	4th place	Teams
1998; Details	Qatar	Algeria	5–4	Kuwait	Romania	2–1	Qatar	4
2000; Details	Saudi Arabia	Sweden	6–6 +10 / +10; 104 /102	South Korea	Egypt	5–2	Saudi Arabia	5
2002; Details	Russia	Russia	8–6	Sweden	Argentina	4–2	Algeria	5

== Medal count ==
Rank	Nation	Gold	Silver	Bronze	Total
1	Sweden	1	1	0	2
2	Algeria	1	0	0	1
2	Russia	1	0	0	1
4	Kuwait	0	1	0	1
4	South Korea	0	1	0	1
6	Argentina	0	0	1	1
6	Egypt	0	0	1	1
6	Romania	0	0	1	1
Totals (8 entries)		3	3	3	9
