= Rune Ohm =

Danish handball player (born 1980)

Personal information
- Full name: Rune Johannes Ohm
- Nationality: Danish
- Born: 10 June 1980 (age 46) Greve Municipality, Denmark
- Height: 1.90 m (6 ft 3 in)

Sport
- Sport: Handball
- Position: Right back
- Current club: TMS Ringsted
- Number: 20

Youth career
- Years: Team
- -: Greve Håndbold

Senior clubs
- Years: Team
- -2002: Ajax Heroes
- 2002-2003: Helsingør IF
- 2003: Kadetten Schaffhausen
- 2003-2006: AaB Håndbold
- 2006-2007: BM Altea
- 2007-2008: BM Antequera
- 2008-2011: Skjern Håndbold
- 2011-2013: SønderjyskE Håndbold
- 2013-2016: Aarhus Håndbold
- 2016-2018: TMS Ringsted
National team
Years	Team	Apps	(Gls)
2002-2009	Denmark	54	(104)
Medal record
Representing Denmark
Men's Handball
European Championship
Bronze medal – third place	2006 Switzerland	Team

Rune Ohm (born 10 June 1980) is a Danish former handball player who played as a right back. He won bronze medals at the 2006 European Championship.

== Career ==
He started playing handball in Greve after which he went to Ajax Heroes and then to Helsingør IF. In February 2023 he joined Swiss club Kadetten Schaffhausen. His next club was AaB Håndbold. While he played for AaB he played some games for the Danish national team. He debuted on the Danish team on 15 March 2002, against Poland. After Aab he changed to the Spanish club BM Altea on a three-year deal. After this club's financial problems he changed to another Spanish club, BM Antequera.

In 2008 he returned to Danish handball, when he signed with Skjern Håndbold. After three years he went to SønderjyskE Håndbold. In the 2012-13 season he scored more than 100 goals for the club. He then signed for Århus Håndbold. In 2016 he joined the First Division team TMS Ringsted, saying that he wanted this move, so he and his family could move back to Sjælland where he comes from. He retired in 2018 after having played 2 years for the Danish team TMS Ringsted.

He played 54 matches and scored 104 goals for the Denmark men's national handball team between 2002 and 2009.
