= Velimir Kljaić =

Croatian handball coach and player (1946-2010)

- Kljaić with Croatia during the 1996 Summer Olympics

Personal information
- Full name: Velimir Kljaić
- Nationality: Croatian
- Born: 10 February 1946 Šibenik, FPR Yugoslavia
- Died: 12 August 2010 (aged 64) Zagreb, Croatia

Sport
- Sport: Handball

Youth career
- Years: Team
- –: RK Medveščak Zagreb

Senior clubs
- Years: Team
- 1963–1976: RK Medveščak Zagreb
- 1976–1980: Klagenfurt

Teams managed
- 1980–1984: RK Medveščak Zagreb
- 1984–1988: TuSpo Nürnberg
- 1988–1992: SG Wallau-Massenheim
- 1992–1994: TV Grosswallstadt
- 1994–1996: TUSEM Essen
- 1996: Croatia
- 1996–1998: SG Wallau-Massenheim
- 1998–1999: Croatia
- 1998–1999: Badel 1862 Zagreb
- 2000–2001: Egypt
- 2001–2002: Kuwait
- 2004–2005: GWD Minden
- 2005–2006: VfL Gummersbach
- 2006: RK Lokomotiva Zagreb
- 2007–2008: TuS Nettelstedt-Lübbecke
Medal record
Men's handball
Head Coach for Croatia
Olympic Games
Gold medal – first place	1996 Atlanta	Team
Head Coach for Egypt
African Championship
Gold medal – first place	2000 Algeria
Head Coach for Kuwait
Asian Championship
Gold medal – first place	2002 Iran

Velimir Kljaić (10 February 1946 – 12 August 2010) was a Croatian handball player and coach.

== Career ==
As a player Kljaić played with RK Medveščak Zagreb and Klagenfurt. As a coach, he won two Croatian championships with RK Zagreb and one Cup. In Germany he was the Coach of the Year in 1992, in which he won German championship and the Cup with SG Wallau-Massenheim.

As head coach of Croatia men's team he won the gold medal in the 1996 Summer Olympics.

He was also head coach of the national teams of Egypt and Kuwait.

== Personal life ==
Kljaić was born in the village of Danilo Gornje, administrative part of Šibenik. He was the father of the former handballer Nenad Kljaić who was a part of Croatia's squad in the 1996 Summer Olympics in Atlanta.

Velimir Kljaić died on 12 August 2010 of lung cancer in Zagreb. He was buried five days after his death in Zagreb.

== Honours ==
=== Player ===
Medveščak

- Yugoslav First League
  - Winner (1): 1966
- Yugoslav Cup
  - Winner (1): 1970
- European Champions Cup
  - Finalist (1): 1964–65

=== Manager ===
Medveščak

- Yugoslav Cup
  - Winner (1): 1981

Wallau-Massenheim

- Bundesliga
  - Winner (1): 1991–92
- IHF Cup
  - Winner (1): 1992

Croatia

- 1996 Summer Olympics – 1st place

Zagreb

- First A League
  - Winner (1): 1998–99
- Croatian Cup
  - Winner (1): 1999
- EHF Champions League
  - Finalist (1): 1998–99

Egypt

- 2000 African Championship – 1st place

Kuwait

- 2002 Asian Championship – 1st place

Gummersbach

- EHF Champions Trophy
  - Finalist (1): 2006

=== Individual ===
- Handball Manager of the Year in Germany – 1992
- The most successful athlete promoter of Croatia in the world: 1996
- Franjo Bučar State Award for Sport – 1996, 2010 (posthumously)
- Best Croatian coach of 1997 by Croatian Handball Federation
- Best Croatian coach of 1997 by Sportske novosti
- Best Croatian coach of 1999 by Croatian Handball Federation
- Best Croatian coach of 1999 by Sportske novosti
