= Eduardo Gurbindo =

Spanish handball player (born 1987)

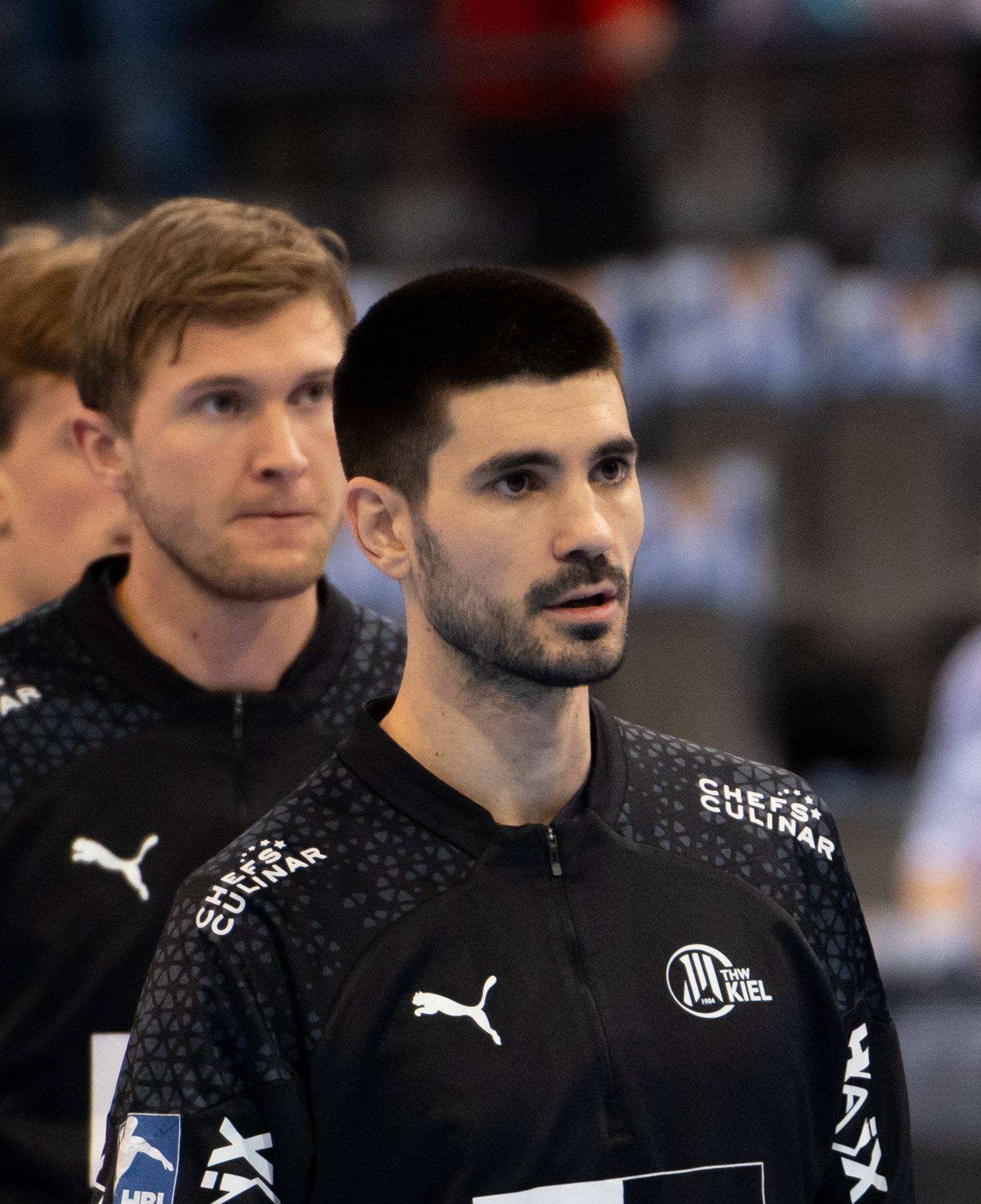
- Gurbindo in 2023

Personal information
- Full name: Eduardo Gurbindo Martínez
- Nationality: Spanish
- Born: 8 November 1987 (age 38) Pamplona, Spain
- Height: 1.95 m (6 ft 5 in)

Sport
- Sport: Handball
- Position: Right back
- Current club: THW Kiel
- Number: 28

Senior clubs
- Years: Team
- 2003–2007: San Antonio
- 2007–2009: Torrevieja
- 2009–2012: Valladolid
- 2012–2016: FC Barcelona Lassa
- 2016–2021: HBC Nantes
- 2021: RK Vardar 1961
- 2021–2023: Dinamo București
- 2023–2024: THW Kiel
- 2024–: Beşiktaş
National team
Years	Team	Apps	(Gls)
2009–	Spain	157	(196)
Medal record
Olympic Games
Bronze medal – third place	2020 Tokyo	Team
European Championship
Gold medal – first place	2018 Croatia
Silver medal – second place	2016 Poland
Silver medal – second place	2022 Hungary/Slovakia
Bronze medal – third place	2014 Denmark
World Championship
Bronze medal – third place	2011 Sweden
- Updated on 3 June 2026

Eduardo Gurbindo Martínez (born 8 November 1987) is a Spanish handball player who plays for THW Kiel and the Spain national team.

He participated at the 2019 World Men's Handball Championship.
