= Eguía =

Eguía is a Spanish surname. Notable people with the surname include:

- Enrique Eguía Seguí (born 1962), Argentine prelate of the Roman Catholic Church
- Esteban Eguía (1890–1934), Spanish footballer
- Esteban de Bilbao Eguía (1879–1970), Spanish politician
- Francisco de Eguía (1750–1827), Spanish military commander and politician
- Julio Ramírez Eguía, Spanish guitarist
- Luis Felipe Eguía (born 1969), Mexican politician
