= Cecilio Alonso =

Spanish handball player (born 1958)

Personal information
- Nationality: Spanish
- Born: 12 January 1958 (age 67); Malagón, Spain

Sport
- Sport: Handball

Cecilio Alonso (born 12 January 1958) is a Spanish handball player. He competed in the men's tournament at the 1984 Summer Olympics.
