= Jan Lennartsson =

Swedish handball player (born 1981)

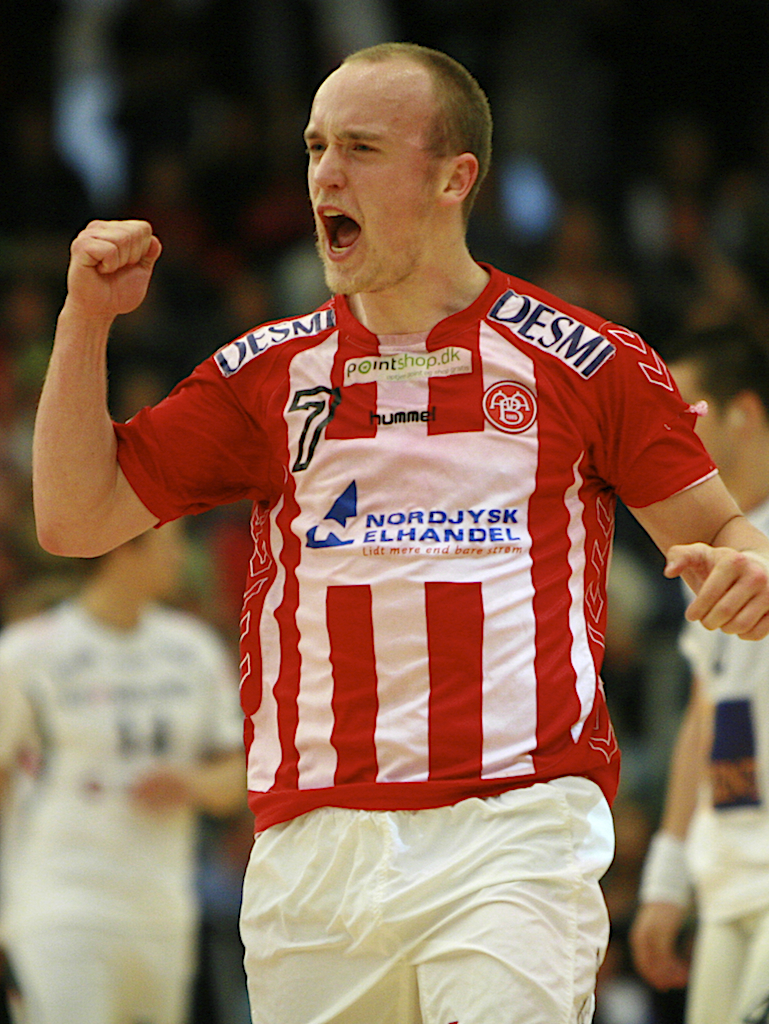

Personal information
- Full name: Jan Lennartsson
- Nationality: Swedish
- Born: September 22, 1981 (age 45) Västerås, Sweden

Sport
- Sport: Handball
- Position: Right wing

Youth career
- Years: Team
- -: IVH Västerås UK

Senior clubs
- Years: Team
- 2000-2007: IK Sävehof
- 2007-2013: Aalborg Håndbold
National team
Years	Team	Apps	(Gls)
2001-2011	Sweden	125	(277)

Jan Lennartsson (born September 22, 1981) is a Swedish handball player. He started his professional career in 2000 playing for IK Sävehof, Gothenburg. After six seasons with the club, he was contracted by the Danish club AaB Håndbold in 2007. He also has played 125 games and scored 277 goals with the Swedish national handball team.

His merits include:

- 2004, winner of league and play-off, Elitserien (men's handball) with IK Sävehof
- 2005, winner of league, Elitserien (men's handball) with IK Sävehof
- 2005, Supercup champion with the Swedish national handball team
- 2006, winner of play-off, Elitserien (men's handball) with IK Sävehof

Jan Lennartsson has been a graduate student at the department of mathematical sciences, University of Gothenburg, Sweden. His research focus was statistical analysis of weather measurements. He was awarded the Licentiate of Engineering degree in 2008.
