= José Manuel Sierra =

Spanish handball player (born 1978)

Jose Manuel Sierra
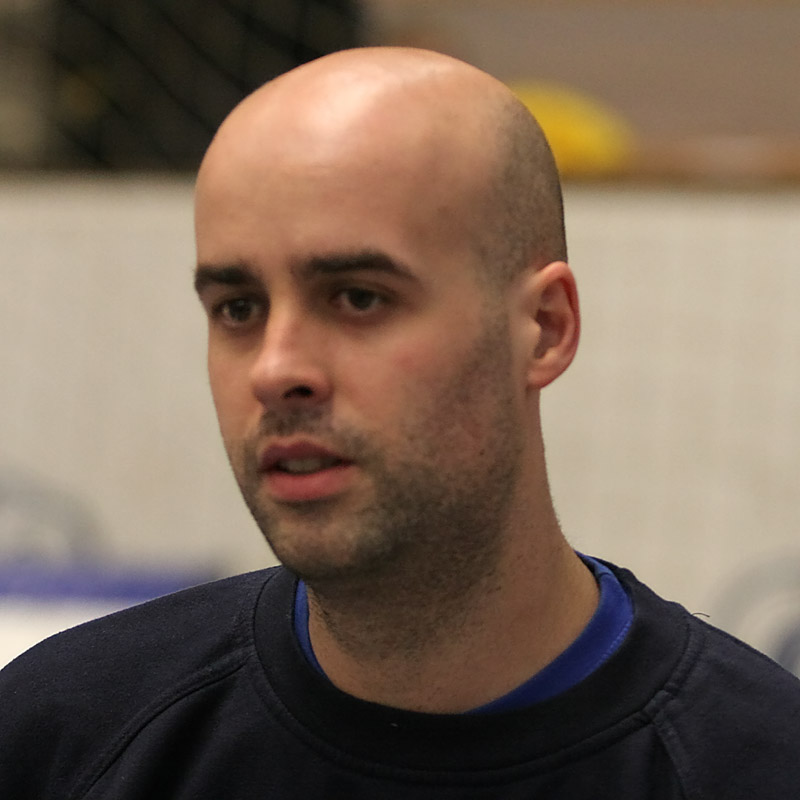

Personal information
- Full name: José Manuel Sierra Méndez
- Born: 21 May 1978 (age 48) Moguer, Spain
- Height: 1.94 m (6 ft 4 in)

Sport
- Sport: Handball
- Position: Goalkeeper

Youth career
- Years: Team
- –: CB Pedro Alonso Niño de Moguer

Senior clubs
- Years: Team
- 1996–2000: FC Barcelona
- 2000–2003: BM Valladolid
- 2003–2004: Ciudad Real
- 2004–2012: BM Valladolid
- 2012–2014: Paris Saint-Germain
- 2014–2018: SC Pick Szeged
- 2018–2020: Saran Loiret Handball
- 2020–2022: Bidasoa Irún
National team
Years	Team	Apps	(Gls)
1997–2015	Spain	111	(0)

Teams managed
- 2022–: Limoges Handball (assistant)
Medal record
World Championships
Gold medal – first place	2013 Spain	Team
European Championships
Bronze medal – third place	2014 Denmark	Team
Mediterranean Games
Gold medal – first place	2005 Spain	Team

José Manuel Sierra Méndez (born 21 May 1978) is a Spanish handball coach and former player. In 2013 he was on the Spanish team that won the 2013 World Championship.

== Career ==
Sierra played youth handball at CB Pedro Alonso Niño de Moguer. At the age of 18 he joined FC Barcelona, where he was the third choice goalkeeper behind Tomas Svensson and David Barrufet. Here he won the Spanish Championship, EHF Champions League, Spanish Supercup, Copa ASOBAL and three times Spanish Cup. In 2000 he joined BM Valladolid, where he won the 2003 Copa ASOBAL. In 2003 he joined Ciudad Real, where he once again won the Spanish championship and Copa ASOBAL. After a year he returned to BM Valladolid.

In 2012 he joined French team Paris Saint-Germain. Here he won the 2013 French Championship and the 2014 French Cup. In 2014 he joined Hungarian Pick Szeged.

In 2018 he joined French team Saran Loiret Handball. In 2020 he returned to Spain to join Bidasoa Irún at the age of 42. In 2021 he and the club finished 2nd in the league behind his former club, FC Barcelona. He retired after the 2021-2022 season, aged 44.

=== National team ===
Sierra debuted for the Spanish national teamm on 27 June 2003 in a 24:24 draw against Serbia. At the 2005 Mediterranean Games he won Gold medals with the Spanish team.

For a long time he was the third choice on the Spanish team behind David Barrufet and Arpad Šterbik. He participated in the 2008, 2010 and 2012 European Championships and the World Championship in 2009.

With Spain he won the 2013 World Championship. A year later he won bronze medals at the 2014 European Championship in Denmark.

== Coaching career ==
After retiring he became the assistant coach at French club Limoges Handball under Alberto Entrerríos.

== Sporting achievements ==
=== Clubs ===
Domestic Titles

- Liga ASOBAL: 1996–1997, 1997–1998, 1998–1999, 1999–2000 (FC Barcelona Handbol); 2003–2004 (BM Ciudad Real).
- Copa del Rey de Balonmano: 1996–1997, 1997–1998, 1999–2000 (FC Barcelona Handbol); 2004–05, 2005–06 (BM Valladolid).
- Supercopa ASOBAL: 1996–1997, 1997–199, 1999–2000 (FC Barcelona Handbol).
- Copas ASOBAL: 1999–2000 (F.C. Barcelona); 2002–2003 (BM Valladolid); 2003–2004 (BM Ciudad Real).
- Hungarian Champion: 2017–18

International Titles

- EHF Champions League: 1996–1997, 1997–1998, 1998–1999, 1999–2000 (FC Barcelona Handbol).
- EHF Cup Winners' Cup: 2008-2009 (BM Valladolid).
- EHF Men's Champions Trophy: 1997, 1998, 1999 (FC Barcelona Handbol).
- Pyrenean handball league: 1997, 1998, 1999 (FC Barcelona Handbol).

=== National team ===
- Gold Medal at the 2005 Mediterranean Games
- Gold Medal at the 2013 World Men's Handball Championship.
