= 2009 Copa del Rey de Balonmano =

Copa del Rey de Balonmano 2009

The 2009 edition of Copa del Rey de Balonmano took place in Granollers, city of the autonomous community of Catalonia. This tournament was played by the 8 first of the Liga ASOBAL when reached the half of the league.

All matches were played in Palau D'Esports de Granollers with capacity of 8,300 seats.

== 2008-09 participants ==
- BM Ciudad Real
- Barcelona Borges
- Portland San Antonio
- Reale Ademar León
- Pevafersa Valladolid
- Fraikin Granollers Host Team
- CAI BM Aragón
- Octavio Pilotes Posadas

== Bracket ==
| Quarterfinals; March 11 & 12 | | Semifinals; March 14 | | Final; March 15 |
| Octavio Pilotes Posadas | 34 |
| CAI BM Aragón | 36 | CAI BM Aragón | 29 |
| Reale Ademar León | 28 | BM Ciudad Real | 33 |
| BM Ciudad Real | 32 | | | BM Ciudad Real | 26 |
| Portland San Antonio | 32 | | | Barcelona Borges | 29 |
| Pevafersa Valladolid | 30 | Portland San Antonio | 26 |
| Fraikin Granollers | 25 | Barcelona Borges | 35 |
| Barcelona Borges | 30 |

=== Quarterfinals ===
11 March 2009:

(8) Octavio Pilotes Posadas 34-36 (7) CAI BM Aragón: (19:00, GTM+1) (Official Match Report)

(4) Reale Ademar León 28-32 (1) BM Ciudad Real: (21:00, GTM+1) (Official Match Report)

12 March 2009:

(3) Portland San Antonio 32-30 (5) Pevafersa Valladolid: (19:00, GTM+1) (Official Match Report)

(6) Fraikin Granollers 25-30 (2) Barcelona Borges: (21:00, GTM+1) (Official Match Report)

=== SemiFinals ===
14 March 2009:

(7) CAI BM Aragón 29-33 (1) BM Ciudad Real: (18:00, GTM+1) (Official Match Report)

(3) Portland San Antonio 26-35 (2) Barcelona Borges: (20:00, GTM+1) (Official Match Report)

=== Final ===
15 March 2009:

(1) BM Ciudad Real 26-29 (2) Barcelona Borges: (18:00, GTM+1) (Official Match Report)

- Copa del Rey de Balonmano 2008/09 Champion: Barcelona Borges.

== Television Broadcasting ==
- Teledeporte
- TVE2

== Organizer ==
- Liga ASOBAL
- Ajuntament de Granollers

== Sponsors ==
- Rehband Sport
- Aegon
- Kyocera
- Škoda Auto
- Mondo Ibérica
- Santiveri
- Renfe
- SabadellAtlántico
