= CB Torrevieja =

Spanish handball club

Torrevieja
- Full name: Club Balonmano Torrevieja
- Founded: 1973
- Dissolved: 2012
- Arena: Palacio de los Deportes, Torrevieja, Valencian Community, Spain
- Capacity: 4,500
- 2011–12: Liga ASOBAL, 9th
Home	Away

Club Balonmano Torrevieja was a handball club based in Torrevieja, Valencian Community. CB Torrevieja played in the Liga ASOBAL until the 2011/2012 season, after which it disbanded due to financial problems.

== History ==
Club Balonmano Torrevieja was founded in 1973 as Grupo de Empresas Torrevieja. The team played in regional divisions until 1888 and achieved promotion to Segunda Nacional. Their first appearance in Liga ASOBAL came in the 2002–03 season playing in overall nine seasons in Liga ASOBAL until 2012 summer when the club was disbanded due to high debts and economic constraints.

== Season by season ==
Season	Tier	Division	Pos.	Notes
1989–90	3	1ª Nacional "B"	3rd (Group 3/B)	
1990–91	3	1ª Nacional "B"	1st (Group 2)	Promoted
1991–92	2	1ª Nacional "A"	9th (Group 3)	
1992–93	2	1ª Nacional "A"	10th (Group 3)	
1993–94	2	1ª Nacional "A"	14th (Group 3)	Relegated
1994–95	3	1ª Nacional	5th (Group D)	
1995–96	3	1ª Nacional	6th (Group C)	
1996–97	3	1ª Nacional	7th (Group C)	
1997–98	3	1ª Nacional	4th (Group D)	
1998–99	3	1ª Nacional	1st (Group D)	
1999–00	3	1ª Nacional	6th (Group D)	
2000–01	3	1ª Nacional	9th (Group D)	Promoted

Season	Tier	Division	Pos.	Notes
2001–02	2	Honor B	2nd	Promoted
2002–03	1	ASOBAL	16th	Relegated
2003–04	2	Honor B	2nd	Promoted
2004–05	1	ASOBAL	13th	
2005–06	1	ASOBAL	8th	
2006–07	1	ASOBAL	10th	
2007–08	1	ASOBAL	8th	
2008–09	1	ASOBAL	12th	
2009–10	1	ASOBAL	12th	
2010–11	1	ASOBAL	11th	
2011–12	1	ASOBAL	9th	Disbanded

Total: 9 seasons in Liga ASOBAL

== Notable players ==
- (Argentina) Diego Simonet
- (Serbia) Dimitrije Pejanović
- (Bosnia and Herzegovina) Nikola Prce
- (Croatia) (Italy) Damir Opalić
- (Spain) Eduardo Gurbindo
- (Spain) Alberto Val
- (Croatia) Tonči Valčić
- (Chile) Rodrigo Salinas Muñoz
- (Iceland) Birkir Guðmundsson
- (Norway) Endre Nordli
- (Norway) Eivind Nygaard
- (Romania) Cornel Durău
- (Slovenia) Jani Čop
- (Serbia) Uroš Mandić
- (Serbia) Mirko Stojanović
- (Sweden) Magnus Jernemyr
- (Croatia) Ivan Vukas
- (Serbia) Milan Rašić
- (Denmark) Rene Bach Madsen

== Stadium information ==
- Name: Palacio de los Deportes
- City: Torrevieja
- Capacity: 4,500
- Address: Avda. Monge y Bielsa s/n
