= Javier Reino =

Spanish handball player (born 1963)

Personal information
- Nationality: Spanish
- Born: 23 April 1963 (age 63)

Sport
- Sport: Handball

Javier Reino (born 23 April 1963) is a Spanish handball player. He competed at the 1984 Summer Olympics and the 1988 Summer Olympics.
