= Tomas Svensson =

Swedish handball player (born 1968)

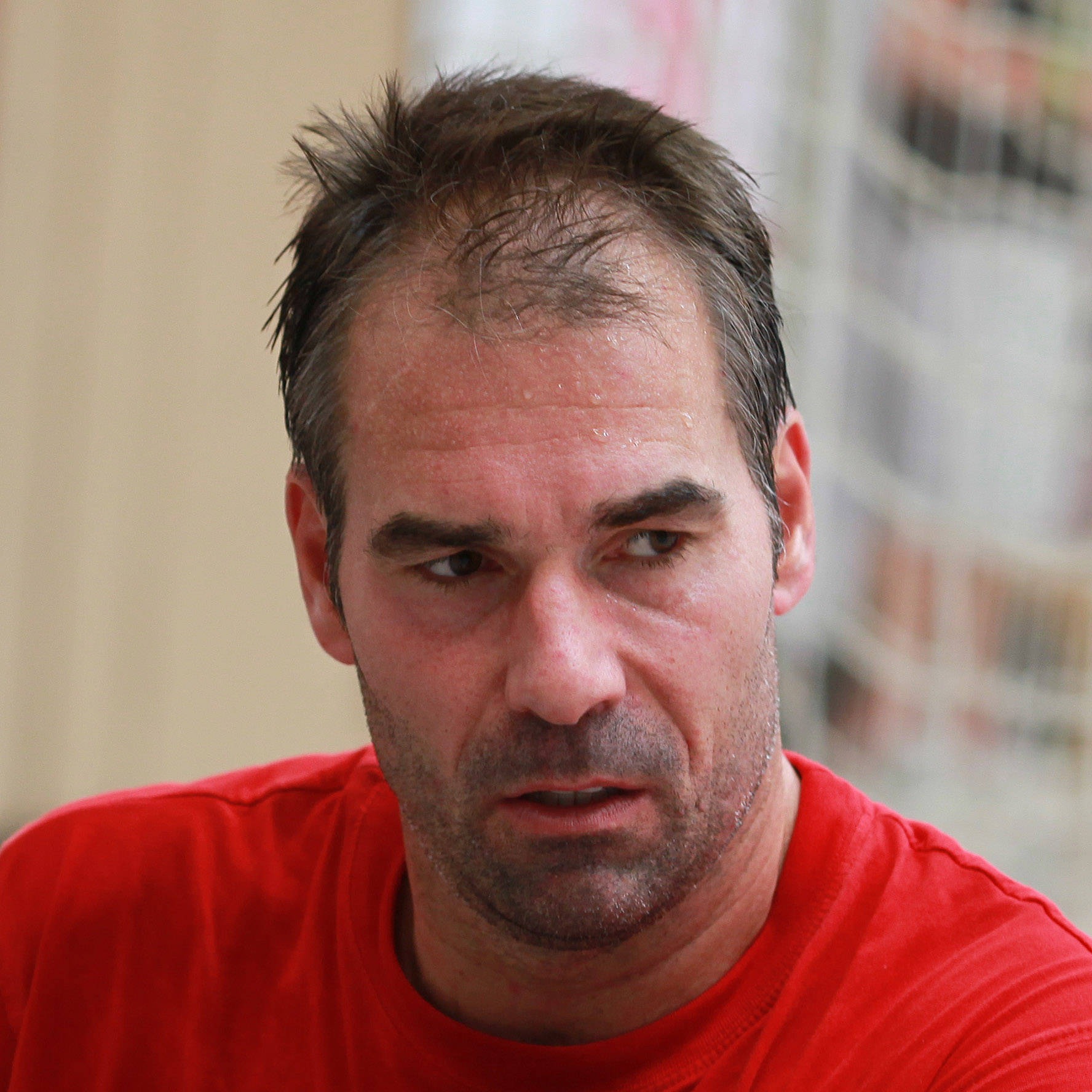

Personal information
- Nationality: Swedish
- Born: 22 August 1968 (age 58) Eskilstuna, Sweden
- Height: 1.94 m (6 ft 4 in)

Sport
- Sport: Handball
- Position: Goalkeeper

Youth career
- Years: Team
- –: Eskilstuna Guif

Senior clubs
- Years: Team
- –1990: Eskilstuna Guif
- 1990–1992: Atlético de Madrid
- 1992–1995: CD Bidasoa
- 1995–2002: FC Barcelona
- 2002–2005: HSV Hamburg
- 2005–2009: Portland San Antonio
- 2009–2011: BM Valladolid
- 2011–2012: Rhein-Neckar Löwen
National team
Years	Team	Apps	(Gls)
1988–2008	Sweden	327	(0)

Teams managed
- 2021–: FC Barcelona
- 2021–: Sweden (goalkeeping coach)
Medal record
Men's handball
Representing Sweden
Olympic Games
Silver medal – second place	1992 Barcelona	Team
Silver medal – second place	1996 Atlanta	Team
Silver medal – second place	2000 Sydney	Team
World Championship
Gold medal – first place	1990 Czechoslovakia
Gold medal – first place	1999 Egypt
Silver medal – second place	2001 France
Bronze medal – third place	1993 Sweden
Bronze medal – third place	1995 Iceland
European Championship
Gold medal – first place	1994 Portugal
Gold medal – first place	2000 Croatia
Gold medal – first place	2002 Sweden

Tomas Runar Svensson (born 15 February 1968) is a Swedish former professional handball goalkeeper who is currently goalkeeping coach of the Swedish men's national handball team, and an assistant coach for FC Barcelona.

== Career ==
Growing up in Eskilstuna it was only natural for him to play for the towns handball team, GUIF, and he was moved up to their senior squad, making his debut in the Swedish top division at the age of 15.

In 1988, at the age of 20, he made his first cap for Sweden and in 1990 he was one of the main forces in the national team who won the World Championship in Czechoslovakia. This success landed him a contract with Atlético Madrid BM in Spain where he played for some time before moving to CD Bidasoa. With this team he won his first Spanish championship in 1995. Right after this he moved to Barcelona where he stayed for several seasons, helping the team become the most prominent handball team in the world, winning just about everything there is to win – including international competitions like EHF Champions League and EHF Men's Champions Trophy as well as Spanish competitions like Liga ASOBAL and Copa del Rey de Balonmano. Svensson moved to Germany and HSV Hamburg for a short while before returning to Spain, this time to play for Portland San Antonio. On 8 May 2012, Svensson officially announced his retirement as a player.

After his playing career, he worked together with Icelandic coach Guðmundur Guðmundsson, first as a goalkeeping coach with the German top team Rhein-Neckar Löwen and later as assistant coach of the Danish national men's team. In 2018, he became goalkeeping coach of the Icelandic national handball team. Between the years of 2014 to 2021 he's been involved with the German team SC Magdeburg, both as a head coach and goalkeeping coach.

In 2021 he became goalkeeping coach for Sweden's national men's team. It was also announced he'll be assistant coach in FC Barcelona from the season of 2021/22.

=== Player clubs ===
- Sweden Eskilstuna GUIF
- Spain Atlético Madrid BM
- Spain CD Bidasoa
- Spain Barcelona
- Germany HSV Hamburg
- Spain Portland San Antonio
- Spain Pevafersa Valladolid
- Germany Rhein-Neckar Löwen

=== Trainer teams ===
- (Germany) Rhein-Neckar Löwen, goalkeeping coach (2011–2012)
- (Germany) Rhein-Neckar Löwen, assistant coach (2012–2014)
- (Denmark) Danish men's national team, goalkeeping coach (2014–2016)
- (Germany) SC Magdeburg, goalkeeping coach (2014–2015)
- (Germany) SC Magdeburg, head coach (2015–2016)
- (Germany) SC Magdeburg, goalkeeping coach (2016–2021)
- (Iceland) Icelandic men's national team, goalkeeping coach (2018–2021)
- (Sweden) Eskilstuna Guif, goalkeeping coach (2019)
- (Sweden) Swedish men's national handball team, goalkeeping coach (2021–)
- (Spain) FC Barcelona, assistant coach (2021–)

== Resume ==
- Caps/goals: 327/0 (1988–2008)
- World champion 1990 (in Prague, Czechoslovakia) and 1999 (in Cairo, Egypt)
- European champion 1994, 2000 and 2002
- 2nd place in the 2001 World championship
- 3rd place in the 1993 and 1995 World championships
- Participated in three Summer Olympics: Barcelona (1992), Atlanta (1996) and Sydney (2000)
- 6 consecutive EHF Champions League titles 1995–2000 (1996–2000 with FC Barcelona)
- Goalkeeper of EHF's Champions League Ultimate Selection in 2013
- EHF Hall of Fame in 2023.
- Swedish player of the Year 2006

== Aircraft accident ==
In 1991, Svensson, along with his then girlfriend, survived the Scandinavian Airlines Flight 751 plane crash in Gottröra, Sweden.

== Personal life ==
Svensson settled in Spain after moving to Barcelona, and married a Spanish woman. His son, Max Svensson, is a professional footballer. He is a paternal uncle of Maja Åskag, Swedish track-and-field athlete.
