= Pabellón Polideportivo Ipurua =

Arena in Eibar, Spain

Coordinates: 43°10′54″N 2°28′43″W

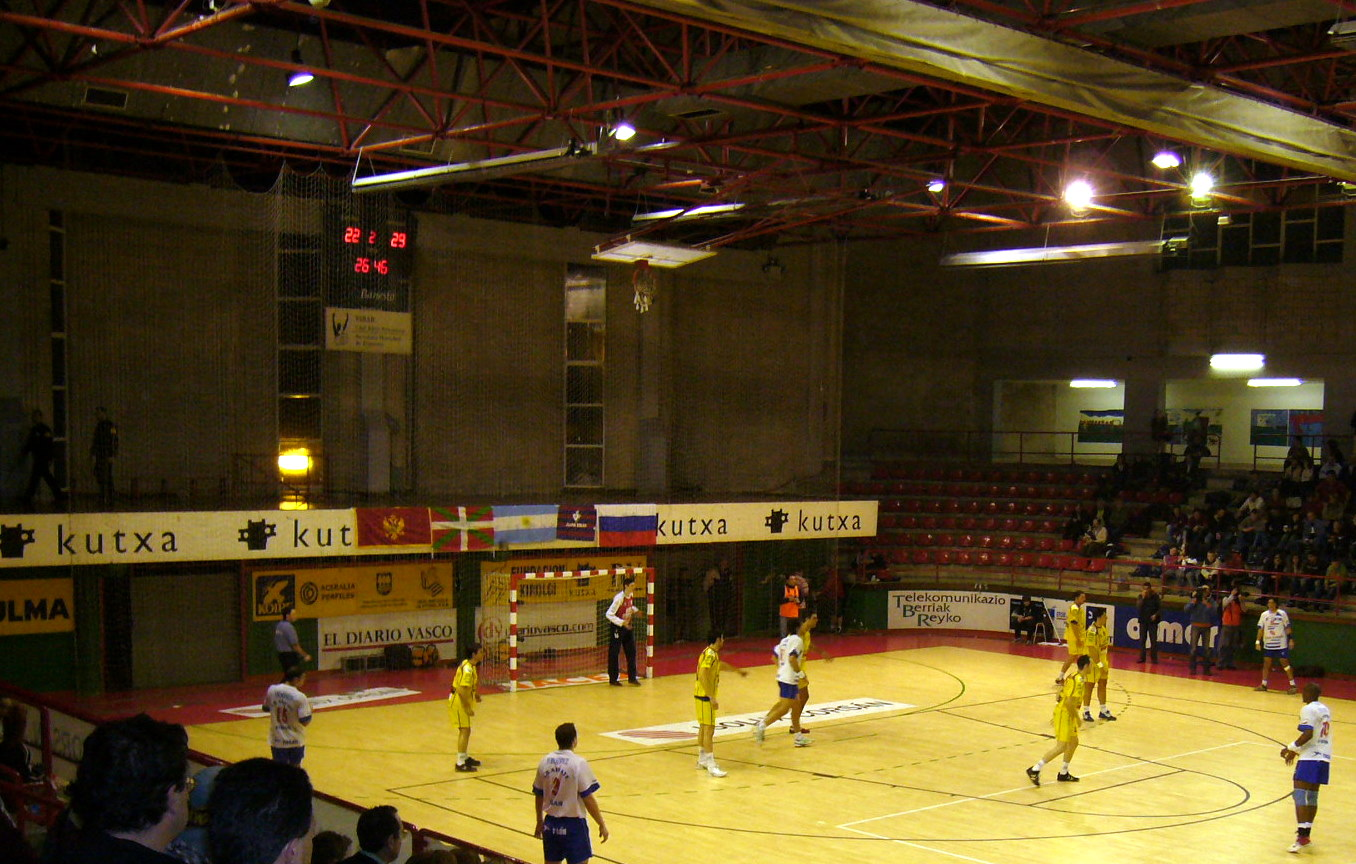
Polideportivo Ipurua in a handball game

Pabellón Polideportivo Ipurua is an arena in Eibar, Spain. It is primarily used for team handball and is the home arena of JD Arrate. The arena holds 3,500 people.
