= BM Altea =

Spanish handball club

Altea
- Full name: Club Balonmano Altea
- Founded: 1974
- Dissolved: 2008
- Ground: Polideportivo Garganes, Altea, Valencian Community, Spain
- Capacity: 1,200
- Chairman: (Spain) Salvador Lledó
- Manager: (Spain) Paco Blasco
- League: 1ª Nacional
- 2007–08: 1ª Nacional, N/A
Home colours	Away colours

Balonmano Altea was a handball team based in Altea, Alicante, Spain. The last season, (2007–08) the team played in 1ª Nacional.

== History ==
- Founded in September 1974. The Balonmano Altea has teams in all categories of Spanish Handball. The President of the Balonmano Altea from season 96/97 is Mr. Paschal Moragues, who already I had this position from season 74/75 to 86/87. Paschal Moragues was the first President of the BM Altea. In season 96/97 the team win the promotion to the Liga ASOBAL (Asobal League) when winning in the Playoff to the BM Barakaldo. In season 98/99 the team is relegated to the First Division of División de Honor B, where remained one year, after promote again to the Asobal League in season 1999/00, category where stay yet in the 2006/2007 season.
- On 11 August 2007, the club was relegated to 1ª Nacional due to financial irregularities.
- At the end of the 2007–2008 season, BM Altea definitely was dissolved.

== Trophies ==
- EHF Cup
  - Semifinal:2002-03
  - Runners-Up: 2003-04
- King Cup
  - Semifinal: 2001-02, 2002-03.
- Asobal League positions
  - 2000-01: 10th
  - 2001-02: 5th
  - 2002-03: 4th
  - 2003-04: 6th
  - 2004-05: 9th
  - 2005-06: 14th
  - 2006-07: 12th

== Statistics 2006/07 ==
Liga ASOBAL	Position	Pts	P	W	D	L	F	A
BM Altea	12	20	30	9	2	19	807	860

- Goals:
  - Rune Ohm - 152 goals
  - Ivan Nikčević - 132 goals
  - Alexandar Buchmann - 96 goals
- Catches:
  - Rade Mijatović - 205 catches 29%
  - Jorge Oliva Domínguez - 138 catches 29%

== Notable players ==
- (Serbia) Ivan Nikčević
- (Serbia) Ratko Nikolić
- (Serbia) Vladimir Mandić
- (Montenegro) Rade Mijatović

== Stadium information ==
- Name: - Polideportivo Garganes
- City: - Altea
- Capacity: - 1,200 spectators
- Address: - C/ Partida Garganes, s/n
