= Rade Mijatović =

Montenegrin handball player (born 1981)

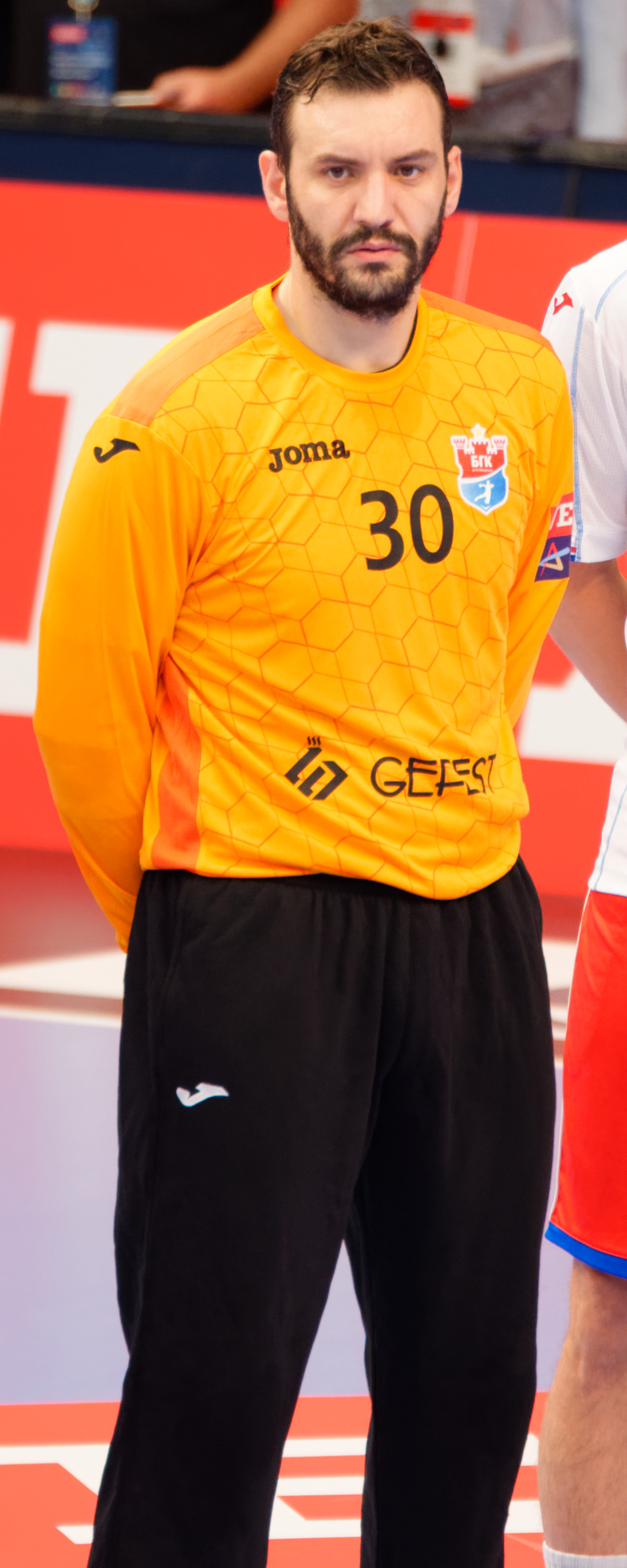
- Mijatović in 2017

Personal information
- Full name: Rade Mijatović
- Nationality: Montenegrin
- Born: 30 June 1981 (age 45) Sombor, SR Serbia, SFR Yugoslavia
- Height: 1.92 m (6 ft 4 in)

Sport
- Sport: Handball
- Position: Goalkeeper

Youth career
- Years: Team
- –: Sutjeska Nikšić

Senior clubs
- Years: Team
- –: Vojvodina
- 2005–2006: Partizan
- 2006–2007: Altea
- 2007–2008: Crvena zvezda
- 2008: Teka Cantabria
- 2008–2010: Alcobendas
- 2011: Toledo
- 2011–2012: Antequera
- 2012–2013: Dinamo Minsk
- 2013–2014: Metalurg Skopje
- 2014–2015: Csurgói KK
- 2015–2016: Tatabánya
- 2016–2018: Meshkov Brest
- 2018–2019: Ferencváros
National team
- Years: Team
- 2006–2018: Montenegro

Rade Mijatović (Montenegrin: Раде Мијатовић; born 30 June 1981) is a Montenegrin handball player.

== Club career ==
Over the course of his career, Mijatović played for Vojvodina, Partizan, Altea, Crvena zvezda, Teka Cantabria, Alcobendas, Toledo, Antequera, Dinamo Minsk, Metalurg Skopje, Csurgói KK, Tatabánya, Meshkov Brest and Ferencváros.

== International career ==
At international level, Mijatović represented Montenegro in five major tournaments, including four European Championships.

== Honours ==
Vojvodina

- Serbia and Montenegro Handball Super League: 2004–05
- Serbia and Montenegro Handball Cup: 2004–05

Dinamo Minsk

- Belarusian Men's Handball Championship: 2012–13

Metalurg Skopje

- Macedonian Handball Super League: 2013–14

Meshkov Brest

- Belarusian Men's Handball Championship: 2016–17, 2017–18
- Belarusian Men's Handball Cup: 2016–17, 2017–18
