= Rafael Baena González =

Spanish handball player (born 1982)

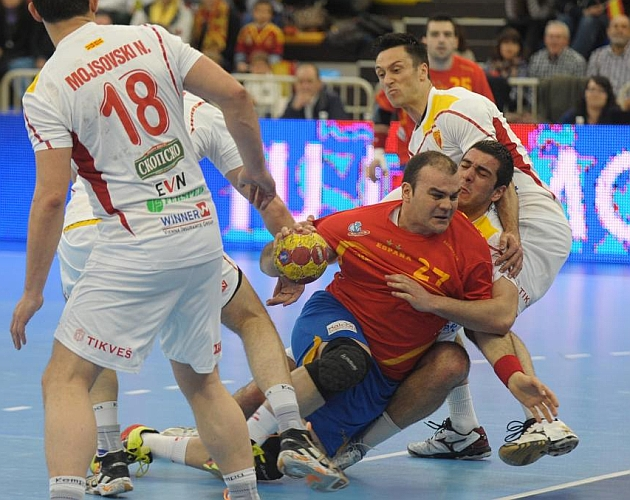
- Baena (in red) playing for Spain in 2015

Personal information
- Nationality: Spanish
- Born: 7 November 1982 (age 43) Estepa, Spain
- Height: 1.91 m (6 ft 3 in)

Sport
- Sport: Handball
- Position: Pivot
- Current club: Club Balonmano Los Dolmenes

Youth career
- Years: Team
- 1996–2000: CB Estepa
- 2000–2003: Balonmano Dos Hermanas
- 2003–2008: ARS Palma del Rio

Senior clubs
- Years: Team
- 2008–2011: Club Balonmano Antequera
- 2011–2012: Ademar Leon
- 2012–2014: US Créteil HB
- 2014–2015: CB Puente Genil
- 2015–2018: Rhein-Neckar Löwen
- 2018–2020: Bergischer HC
- 2020: Club Balonmano Los Dolmenes
- 2020: Rhein-Neckar Löwen
- 2021–: Club Balonmano Los Dolmenes
National team
Years	Team	Apps	(Gls)
2009–	Spain	21	(34)
Medal record
European Championship
Silver medal – second place	2016 Poland

Rafael Baena González (born 7 November 1982) is a Spanish handball player.

He competed at the 2016 European Men's Handball Championship.
