= 2006 Copa del Rey de Balonmano =

The 2005-06 edition of Copa del Rey de Balonmano was disputed in Almería-Vera, Andalusia. The tournament was played by the 8 first of the Liga ASOBAL when reach the half of the league. It was played between the 10th and 14th of May 2006.

== Quarter finals ==
10 May 2006:

- BM Valladolid 36-32 Caja España Ademar León:
- BM Granollers 25-27 FC Barcelona Handbol:

11 May 2006:

- Portland San Antonio 32-35 BM Ciudad Real:
- Keymare Almería 31-34 CAI BM Aragón:

== SemiFinals ==
13 May 2006:

- BM Ciudad Real 35-32 CAI BM Aragón:
- BM Valladolid 31-29 FC Barcelona Handbol:

== Final ==
14 May 2006:

- BM Valladolid 35-30 BM Ciudad Real

== See also ==
- Liga ASOBAL
- Handball in Spain
