= Dimitrije Pejanović =

Serbian handball player (born 1974)

Personal information
- Full name: Dimitrije Pejanović
- Nationality: Serbian
- Born: 9 July 1974 (age 52) Sombor, SR Serbia, SFR Yugoslavia
- Height: 2.00 m (6 ft 7 in)

Sport
- Sport: Handball
- Position: Goalkeeper

Youth career
- Years: Team
- –: Crvenka

Senior clubs
- Years: Team
- –: Crvenka
- –: Crvena zvezda
- –: Crvenka
- 2001–2003: Panellinios
- 2003–2007: Almería
- 2007–2012: Torrevieja
- 2012–2014: Dinamo Minsk
- 2014: Al Rayyan
- 2014–2015: Granollers
- 2015–2016: Huesca
National team
Years	Team	Apps
2007–2011	Serbia	58

Dimitrije Pejanović (Serbian Cyrillic: Димитрије Пејановић; born 9 July 1974) is a Serbian former handball player.

== Club career ==
Over the course of his career that spanned more than two decades, Pejanović spent 11 seasons in Spain. He played for four Liga ASOBAL teams, namely Almería, Torrevieja, Granollers, and Huesca.

== International career ==
At international level, Pejanović represented Serbia in three major tournaments.

== Honours ==
Panellinios

- Greek Men's Handball Championship: 2001–02
- Greek Men's Handball Cup: 2001–02
