= Fredrik Ohlander =

Swedish handball player (born 1976)

Personal information
- Full name: Fredrik Nils Ohlander
- Nationality: Swedish (Sweden)
- Born: 11 February 1976 (age 50) Kungsbacka, Sweden
- Height: 2.00 m (6 ft 7 in)

Sport
- Sport: Handball
- Position: Goalkeeper
- Current club: Retired

Youth career
- Years: Team
- –1996: HK Aranäs

Senior clubs
- Years: Team
- 1996–1998: Önnereds HK
- 1998–2002: KIF Kolding
- 2002–2004: FC Barcelona
- 2004–2005: GWD Minden
- 2005–2008: KIF Kolding
- 2008–2011: BM Granollers
- 2011–2012: KIF Kolding
- 2012–2014: Ystads IF
- 2015: FC Barcelona
National team
Years	Team	Apps	(Gls)
1998–2008	Sweden	64	(0)

Fredrik Nils Ohlander (born 11 February 1976) is a Swedish former handballer. He played as a goalkeeper

He has previously played for Danish Handball League side KIF Kolding and Spanish club FC Barcelona Handbol.

In 2001 he won the Danish Men's Handball Cup with KIF Kolding and was named MVP for the tournament.

Ohlander played 60 matches for the Swedish national handball team.
