= Iñaki Malumbres =

Spanish handball player (born 1975)

Personal information
- Nationality: Spanish
- Born: 3 August 1975 (age 51) Villava – Atarrabia, Navarre, Spain
- Height: 1.85 m (6 ft 1 in)

Sport
- Sport: Handball
- Position: Goalkeeper

Senior clubs
- Years: Team
- –1993: (Spain) Onak
- 1993–1998: (Spain) BM Gáldar
- 1998–2002: (Spain) Valladolid
- 2002–2004: (Spain) San Antonio
- 2004–2009: (Spain) JD Arrate
- 2009–2012: (Spain) BM Aragón
- 2012–2013: (Spain) Ademar León
- 2013–2014: (North Macedonia) RK Vardar
National team
- Years: Team
- –: Spain

Iñaki Malumbres Aldave (born 3 August 1975) was a Navarre handball player who was playing for Spain men's national handball team.
