= JD Arrate =

Spanish handball club

Arrate
- Full name: Juventus Deportiva Arrate
- Founded: 1947
- Dissolved: 2011
- Arena: Polideportivo Ipurua, Eibar, Basque Country, Spain
- Capacity: 3,500
- President: (Spain) Iñaki Bolinaga
- Head coach: (Spain) Julian Ruiz
- League: Liga ASOBAL
- 2010–11: Liga ASOBAL, 15th
Home	Away

Juventud Deportiva Arrate was a handball club based in Eibar, Basque Country. Its last season was 2010–11 in Liga ASOBAL.

== History ==
=== Club names ===
- From 1990 to 1991: Xerox Arrate
- From 1991 to 2011: JD Arrate

Before 2011–12 season, they were expelled from Liga ASOBAL for falling to meet the economic requirement of Liga ASOBAL. Few days after this, Arrate was dissolved by its board members.

== Last Squad 2010/11 ==
- 1 (Slovenia) Blaž Vončina
- 3 (Spain) Sergio Cid
- 5 (Spain) Iker Romero
- 6 (Spain) Jon Azkue
- 7 (Moldova) Igor Petricheev
- 8 (Spain) Mikel Arrieta
- 9 (Spain) Asier Larrañaga
- 11 (Serbia) Bojan Beljanski
- 13 (Spain) Sergio Berrios
- 14 (Spain) Jon Alzaga
- 15 (Hungary) Tamás Szabó
- 16 (Spain) Igor Moyua
- 17 (Spain) Francisco Javier Peña
- 19 (Hungary) István Rédei
- 20 (Spain) Eneko Garetxana
- 21 (Croatia) / (Italy) Tin Tokić
- 22 (Ukraine) Kostyantyn Kurilenko
- 23 (Montenegro) Bogdan Petričević
- 24 (Croatia) Ivan Sever
- 25 (Spain) Aitor Telletxea

== Statistics 2010/11 ==
Liga ASOBAL	Position	Pts	P	W	D	L	F	A
Arrate	14th	14	30	5	4	21	740	877

== Stadium information ==
- Name: - Polideportivo Ipurua
- City: - Eibar
- Capacity: - 3,500
- Address: - C/Santaines Kalea s/n.

== Notable former players ==
- Fernando Fernández Urosa,
- Iñaki Malumbres Aldave
- Alexandru Buligan
- Josemi Marcos Salió
- Jorge Dueñas
- Dalibor Čutura
- Gojko Vučinić
- Tin Tokić
- Blaž Vončina
- Bogdan Petričević
- Bojan Beljanski
- Ivan Sever
- Haris Kreso
- Alen Geko

== Notable former coaches ==
- Viktor Debre
- Francisco Díaz
- Jordi Ribera Romans
- Željko Martinčević
- Jorge Dueñas
