= Copa del Rey de Balonmano =

Annual Spanish handball competition

- Founded: 1957
- Country: Spain
- Confederation: EHF
- Most recent champion: FC Barcelona (2026)
- Most titles: FC Barcelona (30 titles)
- Broadcasters: Teledeporte, RTVE Play, Esport3
- Website: http://www.rfebm.com/
- Copa del Rey 2025–26

The Copa del Rey de Balonmano (English: King's Cup of Handball) is an annual cup competition for Spanish handball teams. Organized by the Liga ASOBAL. It was originally known as the Copa del Generalísimo and was renamed Copa de SM El Rey in 1975. It was the first nationwide handball competition played in Spain, and was first played for in 1957.

== Winners by year ==
Season	Venue	Champion	Runners-up	Score
1957–58	Barcelona	Granollers	FC Barcelona	12–6
1958–59	Bilbao	Arrahona	OAR Gràcia	9-8
1959–60	Madrid	Selección de Madrid	Selección de Guipúzcoa	22-17
1960–61	Zaragoza	Selección de Madrid	Selección de Barcelona	24-22
1961–62	Madrid	Atlético Madrid	Granollers	15-9
1962–63	Madrid	Atlético Madrid	Granollers	19-12
1963–64	Madrid	Selección de Guipúzcoa	Selección de Barcelona	21-11
1964–65	Barcelona	Selección de Barcelona	Selección de Guipúzcoa	15-14
1965–66	Madrid	Atlético Madrid	Granollers	17–16
1966–67	Madrid	Atlético Madrid	Granollers	18–14
1967–68	Bilbao	Atlético Madrid	Eguía	17–14
1968–69	Madrid	FC Barcelona	Eguía	20–14
1969–70	Cádiz	Granollers	Atlético Madrid	15–12
1970–71	Pamplona	Marcol	FC Barcelona	17-15
1971–72	León	FC Barcelona	Marcol	15-9
1972–73	Vigo	FC Barcelona	Atlético Madrid	18-15
1973–74	Granada	Granollers	FC Barcelona	19-15
1974–75	Martorell	Calpisa	Granollers	16-13
1975–76	Lugo	Calpisa	Atlético Madrid	15–10
1976–77	Cartagena	Calpisa	FC Barcelona	15–14
1977–78	Las Palmas	Atlético Madrid	Granollers	29–23
1978–79	A Coruña	Atlético Madrid	Calpisa	26–22
1979–80	Girona	Calpisa	Atlético Madrid	20–18
1980–81	Almería	Atlético Madrid	FC Barcelona	21–18
1981–82	Santander	Atlético Madrid	Granollers	19–14
1982–83	Málaga	FC Barcelona	Bidasoa Irún	36–16
1983–84	Ferrol	FC Barcelona	Atlético Madrid	21–17
1984–85	Oviedo	FC Barcelona	Atlético Madrid	15–14
1985–86	Barcelona	Tecnisán	FC Barcelona	28–26
1986–87	Badajoz	Atlético Madrid	Granollers	20–19
1987–88	Girona	FC Barcelona	Bidasoa Irún	22–20
1988–89	Bilbao	Teka Cantabria	FC Barcelona	25–20
1989–90	Pontevedra	FC Barcelona	Bidasoa Irún	22–20
1990–91	Alzira	Bidasoa Irún	Atlético Madrid	21–18
1991–92	Pamplona	Alzira Avidesa	FC Barcelona	26–25
1992–93	Pontevedra	FC Barcelona	Bidasoa Irún	17–13
1993–94	Granollers	FC Barcelona	Juventud Alcalá	29–23
1994–95	Ciudad Real	Teka Cantabria	Pilotes Posada	27–25
1995–96	León	Bidasoa Irún	FC Barcelona	21–20
1996–97	Castellón	FC Barcelona	Teka Cantabria	30–29
1997–98	Palencia	FC Barcelona	Portland San Antonio	31–26
1998–99	Valladolid	Portland San Antonio	FC Barcelona	32–29
1999–00	Zaragoza	FC Barcelona	Valladolid	34–28
2000–01	Ciudad Real	Portland San Antonio	Ciudad Real	22–20
2001–02	Torrevieja	Caja España Ademar León	Ciudad Real	31–28
2002–03	Santander	Ciudad Real	FC Barcelona	34–21
2003–04	Pamplona	FC Barcelona	Ciudad Real	27–25
2004–05	Pontevedra	Valladolid	FC Barcelona	27–25
2005–06	Almería	Valladolid	Ciudad Real	35–30
2006–07	Altea	FC Barcelona	Caja España Ademar León	33–27
2007–08	Zaragoza	Ciudad Real	FC Barcelona	31–30
2008–09	Granollers	FC Barcelona	BM Ciudad Real	29–26
2009–10	Antequera	FC Barcelona	Ademar León	38–35
2010–11	Vigo	Renovalia Ciudad Real	Cuatro Rayas Valladolid	31–22
2011–12	Torrevieja	Atlético Madrid	FC Barcelona	37–31
2012–13	Logroño	Atlético Madrid	Naturhouse La Rioja	38–28
2013–14	Pamplona	FC Barcelona	Fraikin Granollers	42–32
2014–15	Gijón	FC Barcelona	Fraikin Granollers	27–26
2015–16	Pamplona	FC Barcelona Lassa	Helvetia Anaitasuna	33–30
2016–17	León	FC Barcelona Lassa	Naturhouse La Rioja	34–29
2017–18	Madrid	FC Barcelona Lassa	BM Logroño La Rioja	35–28
2018–19	Alicante	FC Barcelona Lassa	Liberbank Cuenca	24–18
2019–20	Madrid	FC Barcelona	Benidorm	40–25
2020–21	Madrid	FC Barcelona	ABANCA Ademar León	35–27
2021–22	Antequera	FC Barcelona	Fraikin Granollers	30–26
2022–23	Santander	FC Barcelona	BM Logroño La Rioja	34–23
2023–24	Jaén	FC Barcelona	Torrelavega	36–23
2024–25	Irun	FC Barcelona	ABANCA Ademar León	34–25
2025–26	Alicante	FC Barcelona	Bidasoa Irún	37–17

=== Winners by titles ===
Club	Winners	Runners-up	Winning years
FC Barcelona	30	14	1969, 1972, 1973, 1983, 1984, 1985, 1988, 1990, 1993, 1994, 1997, 1998, 2000, 2004, 2007, 2009, 2010, 2014, 2015, 2016, 2017, 2018, 2019, 2020, 2021, 2022, 2023, 2024, 2025, 2026
Atlético Madrid BM	10	7	1962, 1963, 1966, 1967, 1968, 1978, 1979, 1981, 1982, 1987
Ciudad Real	5	5	2003, 2008, 2011, 2012, 2013
Calpisa	5	1	1975, 1976, 1977, 1980, 1986
Granollers	3	11	1958, 1970, 1974

- 2 titles: Selección de Balonmano de Madrid, Teka Cantabria, Bidasoa Irún, San Antonio and Valladolid.
- 1 title: Arrahona, Selección de Balonmano de Guipúzcoa, Selección de Balonmano de Barcelona, Marcol, Alzira Avidesa and Ademar León.
