= Patrik Ćavar =

Croatian handball player (born 1971)

Personal information
- Nationality: Croatian
- Born: 24 March 1971 (age 55) Metković, SR Croatia, SFR Yugoslavia
- Height: 1.95 m (6 ft 5 in)

Sport
- Sport: Handball
- Position: Left wing, centre back
- Number: 13

Youth career
- Years: Team
- 1983–1986: Metković

Senior clubs
- Years: Team
- 1986–1989: Mehanika Metković
- 1989–1990: Borac Banja Luka
- 1990–1997: Badel 1862 Zagreb
- 1997–2001: FC Barcelona
- 2001–2005: BM Granollers
- 2005: Agram Medveščak
- 2005–2007: Saint-Marcel Vernon
National team
Years	Team	Apps	(Gls)
1988–1989	Yugoslavia U-21	45	(?)
1989–1991	Yugoslavia		
1991–2004	Croatia	120	(639)
Medal record
Men's handball
Representing Yugoslavia
Goodwill Games
Silver medal – second place	1990 Seattle	Team
IHF Junior World Championship
Bronze medal – third place	1989 Spain	Team
Representing Croatia
Olympic Games
Gold medal – first place	1996 Atlanta	Team
World Championship
Silver medal – second place	1995 Iceland	Team
European Championship
Bronze medal – third place	1994 Portugal	Team
Mediterranean Games
Gold medal – first place	1993 Languedoc-Roussillon	Team

Patrik Ćavar (born 24 March 1971) is a retired Croatian handball player. He played in Croatia for Mehanika Metković, Badel 1862 Zagreb and Agram Medveščak, in Bosnia and Herzegovina for Borac Banja Luka, in Spain for FC Barcelona, BM Granollers, and in France for Saint-Marcel Vernon.

Ćavar has stated that Veselin Vujović was a big influence on him opting to playing handball.

He played for the Croatian national team at the 1996 Summer Olympics in Atlanta, where Croatia won the gold medal. Ćavar was the top goalscorer of the Croatian national team from 1996 to 2007, when Mirza Džomba broke his record.

He is also the only Croatian handball player to have won five EHF Champions League titles.

== Career ==
=== Mehanika Metković ===
Ćavar started his career in his hometown club RK Mehanika Metković. He entered the senior squad at the age of 15. At Metković he played in the Yugoslav Second League finishing in the middle of the table.

=== Borac Banja Luka ===
Due to his performances in Metković Ćavar caught the eye of top-tier club RK Borac Banja Luka and moved to the club in 1989. He spent one season with the club finishing the regular part of the season in first place and then losing to Proleter Naftagas Zrenjanin in the final of the play-offs.

=== Zagreb ===
In 1990, Ćavar moved to RK Zagreb-Chromos.

During his first season with Zagreb, Ćavar had won the Yugoslav First League and was the league's top goalscorer. They had also won the Yugoslav Cup in a tense final against RK Crvena Zvezda.

Due to Croatia gaining Independence that same year the Yugoslav Handball Championship was dismantled and the Croatian Handball Championship was formed. The First A League started on 21 March.

By that time Ćavar and his team qualified for the semi-finals of the European Champions Cup. The club had changed its name to Zagreb-Loto due to sponsorship. Their campaign started with a win at home and a loss away with the aggregate coming to a win of 54:48 against Dukla Liberec. The quarter-final match was played against SKIF Krasnodar, they won both matches with the result 50:44 for Zagreb. In the semi-final Zagreb-Loto won the first match against Kolding IF 26:17 and lost the second match 20:26 with this result they entered the final due to aggregate 46:43 being in their favor. The first final match was played in Zagreb where Ćavar and his team beat TEKA Santander 22:20. In the second match Zagreb-Loto destroyed TEKA Santander in big 28:18 defeat. Ćavar scored 4 goals in each of the final matches.

Ćavar also took the first ever Croatian domestic titles beating Zamet in the league and Coning Medveščak in the finals.

The following season Ćavar's club changed its name again due to sponsorship reasons into RK Badel 1862 Zagreb.

Ćavar and his team conquered Croatia and Europe once again. Their European campaign brought them to the finals of the European Champions Cup yet again defeating Pivovara Laško Celje, Maccabi, ABC Braga and HB Venissieux Lyon. They played against SG Wallau-Massenheim winning both matches and taking the last European Champions Cup trophy. Ćavar scored 4 goals in each of the final matches. They had also won the domestic league and cup for another year in a row. Ćavar was awarded the best player of the Croatian First A League for that season.

The 1993–94 season saw Ćavar winning the domestic title and he was awarded the best player of the Croatian First A League yet again. In 1994 he was named best Croatian handballer by Croatian Handball Federation and Sportske novosti.

During the next three seasons, Ćavar won all of the domestic titles and reached the EHF Champions League final in 1995 and 1997.

=== Barcelona ===
In 1997, Ćavar moved to FC Barcelona Handbol. The same year he was voted the best Croatian handballer by Croatian Handball Federation and Sportske novosti again. In 1998 he was the 9th best handball player of the year.

With Barcelona Ćavar won: three EHF Champions League, two EHF Champions Trophy, three Liga ASOBAL, two Copa del Rey, two Copa ASOBAL, four Supercopa ASOBAL and four Pirenees League titles.

In, 2000, he was a, then, record-breaking third title as the best Croatian handballer. The same year, Barcelona named him their best foreign player and then their best player of the season.

In his last season with the club, Ćavar lost the EHF Champions League final to SDC San Antonio and the league as well as the EHF Men's Champions Trophy.

=== Granollers ===
In the summer of 2001, Ćavar joined BM Granollers.

Ćavar played at the club for four years. Even though he did not win any trophies at the club they had a solid league position and in his last season with the club they reached the quarter-final of the EHF Cup.

=== Agram Medveščak ===
In the summer of 2005 it was announced that Patrik Ćavar would be moving to Agram Medveščak though his move was slowed down due to registration problems.

On 25 October 2005 Ćavar announced that his retirement from handball due to his various injuries.

=== Saint-Marcel Vernon ===
A month after announcing his retirement on November 25 Ćavar announced that he would be moving to the French second division club Saint-Marcel Vernon.

He helped the club win the French Second League and earn promotion to the First League.

In July 2007, at the age of 36, he announced his retirement from handball.

== International career ==
=== Yugoslavia ===
Ćavar was selected on 45 occasions as a junior for Yugoslavia and won a bronze medal at the 1989 IHF Junior World Championship in Spain.

Ćavar won a silver medal at the 1990 Goodwill Games in Seattle with Yugoslavia.

=== Croatia ===
Ćavar debuted for Croatia on 14 January 1991 in Croatia's first ever national team match, a 23:23 draw against Japan.

Ćavar's first tournament with the national team was in at the 1993 Mediterranean Games in Languedoc-Roussillon where he won his first gold medal for Croatia.

His first major competition came a year later in June 1994 when he played at the 1994 European Championship. A year later he was called up to play the 1995 World Championship in Iceland. Croatia lost in the final to France and Ćavar had bagged his first silver medal for the national team.

At the 1996 European Championship in Spain, Croatia finished in fifth place. Ćavar was the second top goalscorer 40 goals just one goal behind Thomas Knorr. Two months later history was made at the 1996 Summer Olympics in Atlanta. Ćavar and his teammates won the against Sweden in the final and won their first and Croatia's first ever Olympic Gold medal. Ćavar was also the tournaments top goalscorer with 43 goals and he was voted the best left wing of the tournament and put in the all-star team.

Unfortunately years of bad results would come to haunt the national team of Croatia and Ćavar would not win another medal. He also competed at the 1997 World Championship in Japan, 1998 European Championship in Italy, 1999 World Championship in Egypt, and at the 2001 World Championship in France.

In 2004, he retired from the national team with 120 appearances and as the top goalscorer with 639 goals. He held the record until 2007 when Mirza Džomba broke his record.

== Influence ==
Ćavar has been a big influence to handball players such as Nikola Karabatić and Mohamed Mokrani.

== Honours ==
Zagreb

- Yugoslav Championship
  - Winner (1): 1990-91
- Yugoslav Cup
  - Winner (1): 1991
- Croatian A First League
  - Winner (6): 1991-92, 1992–93, 1993–94, 1994–95, 1995–96, 1996–97
- Croatian Cup
  - Winner (6): 1992, 1993, 1994, 1995, 1996, 1997
- European Champions Cup
  - Winner (2): 1992, 1993
- EHF Champions League
  - Finalist (2): 1995, 1997
- EHF Super Cup
  - Winner (1): 1993

Barcelona

- Liga ASOBAL
  - Winner (3): 1997-98, 1998–99, 1999-00
  - Runner-up (1): 2000-01
- Copa del Rey
  - Winner (2): 1998, 2000
  - Finalist (1): 1999
- Copa ASOBAL
  - Winner (2): 2000, 2001
  - Finalist (1): 1999
- Supercopa ASOBAL
  - Winner (4): 1997, 1998, 2000, 2001
- Pirenees League
  - Winner (4): 1997-98, 1998–99, 1999-00, 2000-01
- EHF Champions League
  - Winner (3): 1997-98, 1998-99, 1999-00
  - Finalist (1): 2000-01
- EHF Champions Trophy
  - Winner (2): 1998, 1999
  - Finalist (1): 2000

Saint-Marcel Vernon

- French Second League
  - Winner (1): 2005-06

Individual

- Yugoslav First League top scorer: 1990-91
- Best player of the Croatian First A League: 1992–93, 1993–94, 1994–95, 1995–96, 1996–97
- Best Croatian handballer of 1994, 1997 and 2000 by: CHF & Sportske novosti
- 2nd top scorer at the 1996 European Championship
- Best left wing at 1996 Summer Olympics
- Top scorer of the 1996 Summer Olympics
- All-star team of the 1996 Summer Olympics
- Franjo Bučar State Award for Sport: 1996
- IHF World Player of the Year award 9th - 1998
- Best player of the Liga ASOBAL: 1998-99
- Best foreign player of Barcelona - 1999-2000
- Best player of Barcelona - 1999-2000

Records

- 2nd top goalscorer of Croatia - 639 goals
- Best % of goals scored for Croatia - 5.33

== Orders ==
- Order of Danica Hrvatska with face of Franjo Bučar - 1995

Sporting positions
Preceded by Goran Perkovac; 3	Captain of Croatia; 1998-1999	Succeeded by Slavko Goluža; 5
