= Jackson Richardson =

French handball player (born 1969)

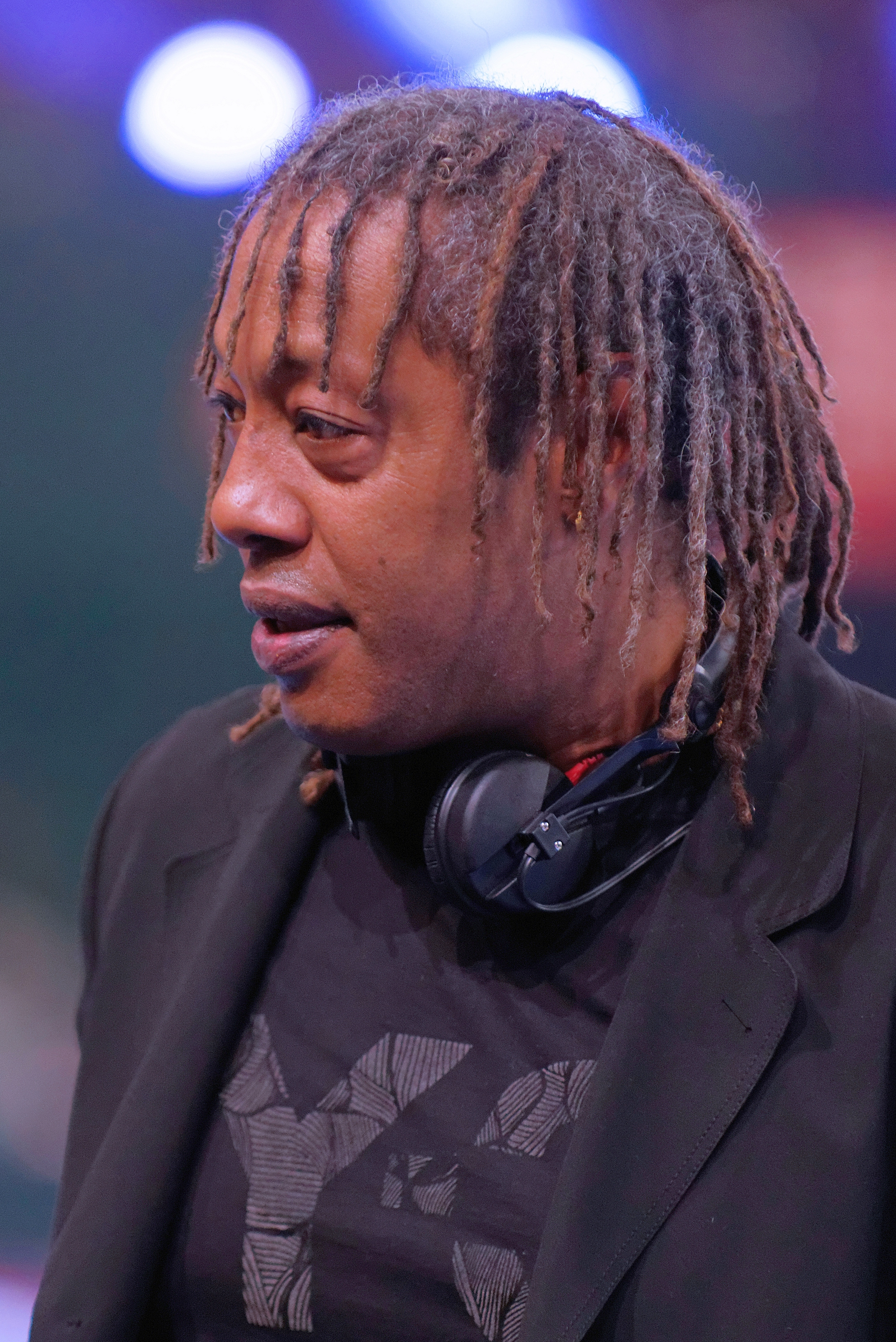
- Richardson in 2013

Personal information
- Nationality: French
- Born: 14 June 1969 (age 57) Saint-Pierre, Réunion
- Height: 1.86 m (6 ft 1 in)

Sport
- Sport: Handball
- Position: Centre Back

Youth career
- Years: Team
- 1977–1989: Saint-Pierre HBC

Senior clubs
- Years: Team
- 1989–1991: Paris-Asnières
- 1991–1996: OM Vitrolles
- 1996–2000: TV Großwallstadt
- 2000–2005: Portland San Antonio
- 2005–2008: Chambéry Savoie Handball
- 2009: Rhein-Neckar Löwen
National team
| Years | Team | Apps | (Gls) |
| 1990–2005 | France | 417 | (775) |
Medal record
Men's handball
Representing France
Olympic Games
| Bronze medal – third place | 1992 Barcelona | Team competition |
World Championship
| Gold medal – first place | 1995 Iceland | Team competition |
| Gold medal – first place | 2001 France | Team competition |
| Silver medal – second place | 1993 Sweden | Team competition |
| Bronze medal – third place | 1997 Japan | Team competition |
| Bronze medal – third place | 2003 Portugal | Team competition |
| Bronze medal – third place | 2005 Tunisia | Team competition |
Mediterranean Games
| Bronze medal – third place | 2001 Tunis | Team competition |

Jackson Richardson (born 14 June 1969) is a French former handball player. Regarded as one of the best and most influential handball players of his era, Richardson won fourteen titles at club level and the World Championship in 1995 and 2001 with the French national team. He was awarded IHF World Player of the Year in 1995, and voted the most valuable player at the World Championships in 1990 and 1995, and the 2000 European Championship.

With the national team, Richardson also received one silver medal and three bronze medals at the World Championships in 1993, 1997, 2003 and 2005, and won the bronze medal in the 1992 Summer Olympics in Barcelona. He holds the record for most caps for the French national team with 417 appearances. As the captain of the national team, Richardson was France's flag bearer during the 2004 Olympic Games opening ceremony in Athens.

== Club career ==
Richardson started playing handball when he was six years old and was a part of the youth team at Saint-Pierre HBC from 1977 to 1989. In 1988, he was spotted during a match at Réunion Island by French national team head coach Daniel Costantini who was scouting for a Réunionese player for Bataillon de Joinville, a military unit of the French army for sport conscripts. After completing his military service, Richardson signed for Paris-Asnières in 1989.

In 1991, Richardson transferred to OM Vitrolles, where he would win the French league in 1994 and 1996, the French cup in 1993 and 1995, and the EHF Cup Winners' Cup in 1993. He joined German club TV Großwallstadt in 1996 and won the EHF Challenge Cup in 2000. That same year, Richardson moved to Spanish club Portland San Antonio, where he won the EHF Champions League in 2001 and the Spanish league in 2002 and 2005. He was also voted Best playmaker of the Spanish league for three consecutive seasons from 2003 to 2005.

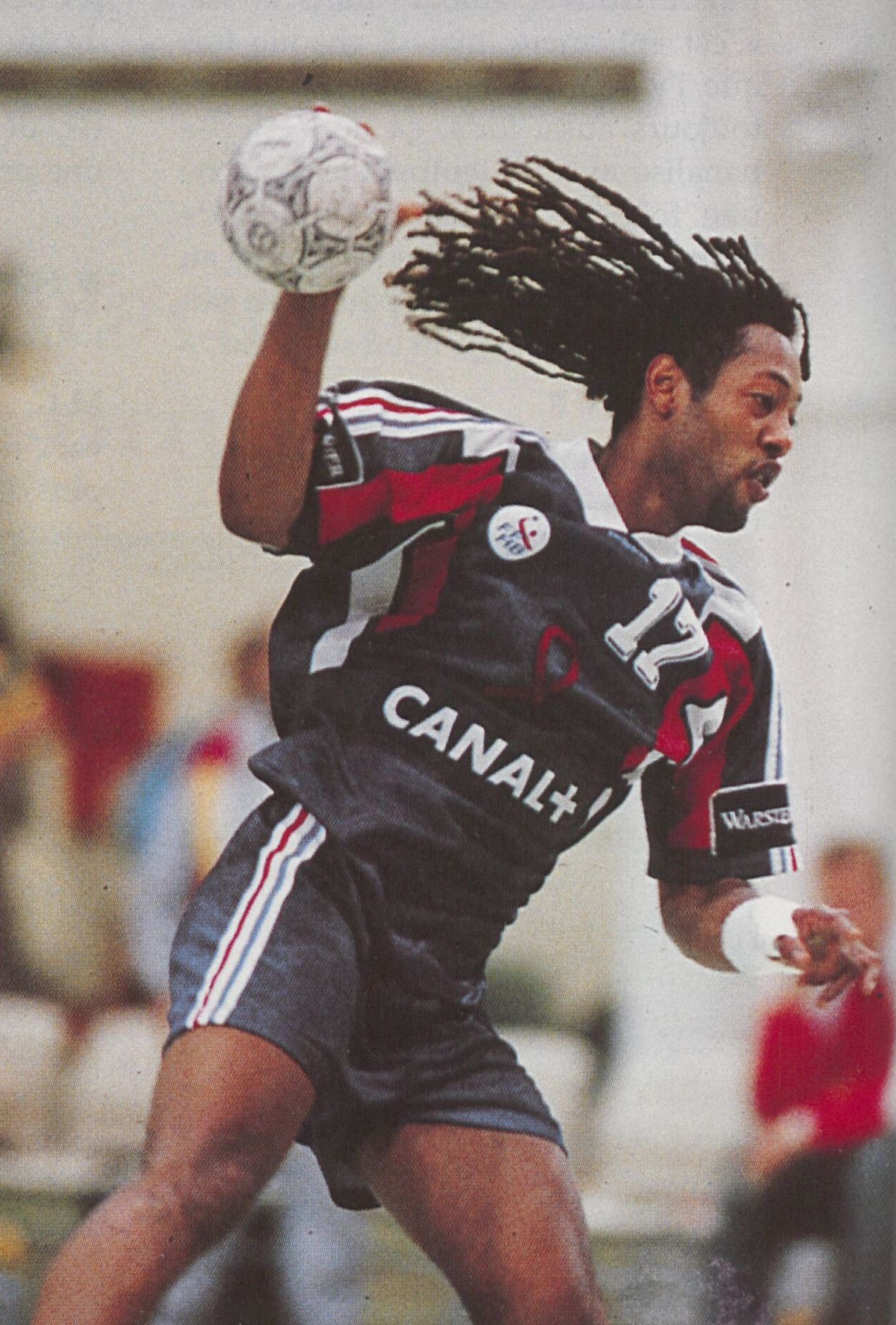
Richardson playing for France in 1995

Richardson returned to France in 2005 to play for Chambéry Savoie Handball. In 2008, Richardson retired after a final match against US Ivry, but later came out of retirement to briefly play for Rhein-Neckar Löwen in 2009.

== International career ==
Richardson made his debut for the French national team in 1990. He was voted the most valuable player at the 1990 World Championship where France placed ninth. Jackson was part of the French squad that won the bronze medal at the 1992 Summer Olympics in Barcelona. Jackson and the national team placed second at the 1993 World Championship and won the 1995 World Championship, where he was again voted the most valuable player of the tournament.

France finished second at the 1997 World Championship and fourth at the 2000 European Championship, where Richardson received his third most valuable player award for a major international competition. He won the 2001 World Championship with the national team, and placed third at the World Championships in 2003 and 2005.

Richardson retired from the national team in 2005, having made 417 appearances and scored 775 goals. The French Handball Federation celebrated his farewell to the team with a ceremony after the Paris-Bercy tournament attended by sport figures and his mother, who had traveled from their native Réunion. Richardson dedicated the tournament to his father who had recently passed away.

== Personal life ==
Richardson is married and has two children. His son, Melvyn, is a handball player for FC Barcelona and member of the French national team.

== Honours ==
=== Club ===
OM Vitrolles

- EHF Cup Winners' Cup: 1993
- LNH Division 1: 1994, 1996
- Coupe de France: 1993, 1995

TV Großwallstadt

- EHF Challenge Cup: 2000

Portland San Antonio

- EHF Champions League: 2001
- EHF Cup Winners' Cups: 2004
- EHF Supercup: 2000
- Liga ASOBAL: 2002, 2005
- Copa del Rey: 2001
- Supercopa ASOBAL: 2001, 2002

=== International ===
- World Championship:
  - Gold: 1995, 2001
  - Silver: 1993
  - Bronze: 1997, 2003, 2005
- Olympic Games
  - Bronze: 1992

=== Individual ===
- IHF World Player of the Year: 1995
- EHF Champions League Ultimate Selection: 2013
- MVP at the 1990 World Championship
- MVP and best centre back at the 1995 World Championship
- MVP and best centre back at the 2000 European Championship
- Best foreign player of the Spanish League: 2001, 2002
- Best playmaker of the Spanish League: 2003, 2004, 2005
- European Handball Federation Hall of Fame in 2023.

Awards and achievements
| Preceded by (Russia) Talant Duyshebaev | IHF World Player of the Year – Men; 1995 | Succeeded by (Spain) Talant Duyshebaev |
| Preceded by David Douillet | French Sportsperson of the Year; 2001 | Succeeded by Carole Montillet |
Olympic Games
| Preceded by David Douillet | Flagbearer for France; Athens 2004 | Succeeded by Tony Estanguet |
