= Alexandru Buligan =

Romanian handball player (born 1960)

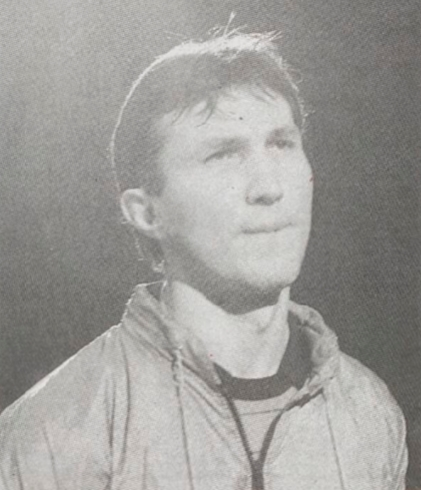
- Buligan in 1990

Personal information
- Born: 22 April 1960 (age 66) Drobeta-Turnu Severin, Romania
- Height: 200 cm (6 ft 7 in)
- Weight: 89 kg (196 lb)

Sport
- Sport: Handball
- Club: Poli Timișoara (1977–81); Steaua (1981–82); Poli Timișoara (1982–88); Dinamo București (1988–90); JD Arrate (1990–94); BM Guadalajara (1994–95); SDC San Antonio (1995–2002)
Medal record
Representing Romania
Olympic Games
Bronze medal – third place	1984 Los Angeles	Team
World Championship
Bronze medal – third place	1990 Czechoslovakia	Team

Alexandru Buligan (born 22 April 1960) is a retired Romanian handball goalkeeper who played a record of 280 international games for Romania. He won bronze medals at the 1984 Summer Olympics and the 1990 World Championships.

At the club level he played in Romania until 1990 and in Spain from 1990 to 2002. After that he worked as a goalkeeper coach and assistant for the Spain men's national handball team, winning with them the 2005 World Men's Handball Championship.

== Honours ==
Player

- Romanian League: 1982
- Romanian Cup: 1986, 1988
- Spanish League: 2002
- Spanish Cup: 1999, 2001
- Spanish Supercup: 2002
- EHF Cup Winners' Cup: 2000
- EHF Supercup: 2000
- EHF Champions League: 2001

Individual

- World Championship Best Goalkeeper: 1990
- Liga ASOBAL Goalkeeper of the Year: 1991, 1997, 1998, 2000
