= Nedeljko Jovanović =

Serbian handball player (born 1970)

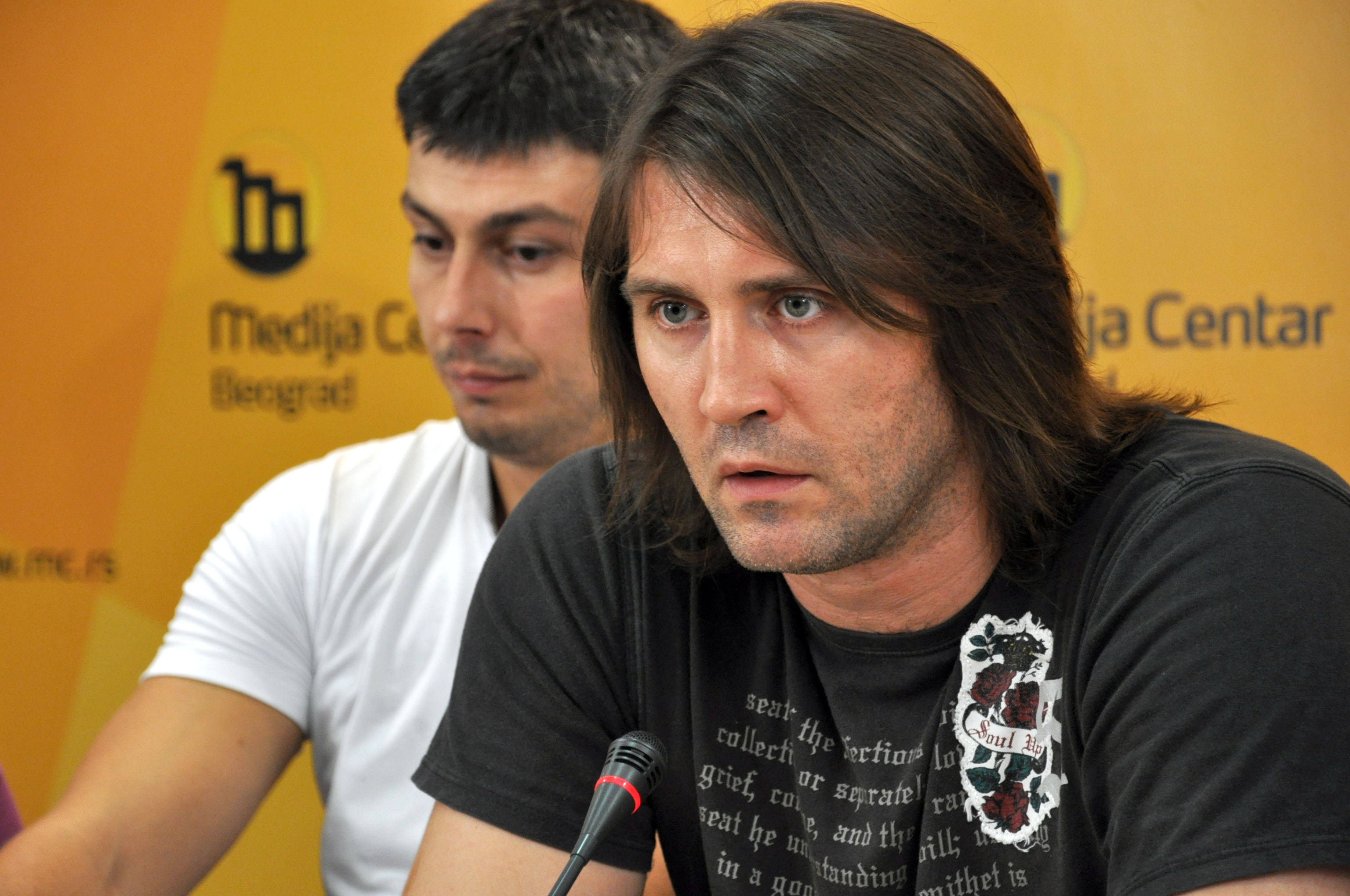
- Jovanović in 2009

Personal information
- Full name: Nedeljko Jovanović
- Nationality: Serbian
- Born: 16 September 1970 (age 56) Belgrade, SR Serbia, SFR Yugoslavia
- Height: 1.93 m (6 ft 4 in)

Sport
- Sport: Handball
- Position: Centre back

Youth career
- Years: Team
- –: Sinđelić Beograd

Senior clubs
- Years: Team
- 1988–1991: Metaloplastika
- 1991–1993: Partizan
- 1993–1994: Elgorriaga Bidasoa
- 1994–1995: Teka Cantabria
- 1995–1997: OSC 04 Rheinhausen
- 1998: TV Niederwürzbach
- 1998–2000: TUSEM Essen
- 2000–2001: SG Hameln
- 2001–2004: Portland San Antonio
- 2004–2005: Algeciras
- 2005: Gold Club
- 2005–2006: Arrate
- 2006: Pick Szeged
- 2007–2009: HIT Innsbruck
- 2009–2010: Kolubara
National team
- Years: Team
- 1990–1992: Yugoslavia
- 1995–2003: FR Yugoslavia

Teams managed
- 2018: Novi Pazar
- 2018–2019: Serbia (assistant)
Medal record
Men's handball
Representing Yugoslavia
Goodwill Games
Silver medal – second place	1990 Seattle	Team
Mediterranean Games
Gold medal – first place	1991 Athens	Team
Representing FR Yugoslavia
World Championship
Bronze medal – third place	1999 Egypt	Team
Bronze medal – third place	2001 France	Team
European Championship
Bronze medal – third place	1996 Spain	Team

Nedeljko Jovanović (Serbian Cyrillic: Недељко Јовановић; born 16 September 1970) is a Serbian former handball player and current coach.

== Club career ==
After playing for Metaloplastika, Jovanović joined Partizan in 1991. He proved instrumental in helping the club win its first ever national championship in the 1992–93 season. Subsequently, Jovanović moved abroad and played for two seasons in Spain with Elgorriaga Bidasoa (1993–94) and Teka Cantabria (1994–95).

In 1995, Jovanović switched to Germany and signed with OSC 04 Rheinhausen. He also played for TV Niederwürzbach, TUSEM Essen and SG Hameln in the Handball-Bundesliga. In August 2001, it was announced that Jovanović would be returning to Spain and joining Portland San Antonio on a three-year contract. He helped the club win the Liga ASOBAL for the first time ever in the 2001–02 season.

After leaving San Antonio, Jovanović played for Algeciras and Arrate (both in Spain), Gold Club (Slovenia), Pick Szeged (Hungary) and HIT Innsbruck (Austria). In August 2010, less than a month shy of his 40th birthday, Jovanović announced his retirement from playing. He previously won the Serbian Handball Super League and Serbian Handball Cup with Kolubara in his last season.

== International career ==
At international level, Jovanović represented FR Yugoslavia in eight major tournaments, winning two bronze medals at the World Championships (1999 and 2001) and one bronze at the European Championships (1996). He also participated in the 2000 Summer Olympics.

== Coaching career ==
After serving as head coach of Novi Pazar for a few months, Jovanović became an assistant to Nenad Peruničić with the Serbia men's national handball team in September 2018. He was dismissed via SMS text message sent by Peruničić just weeks ahead of the 2020 European Championship.

== Honours ==
Partizan

- Handball Championship of FR Yugoslavia: 1992–93
- Handball Cup of FR Yugoslavia: 1992–93

Portland San Antonio

- Liga ASOBAL: 2001–02
- Supercopa ASOBAL: 2001–02, 2002–03
- EHF Cup Winners' Cup: 2003–04

Kolubara

- Serbian Handball Super League: 2009–10
- Serbian Handball Cup: 2009–10
