= Davor Dominiković =

Croatian handball player (born 1978)

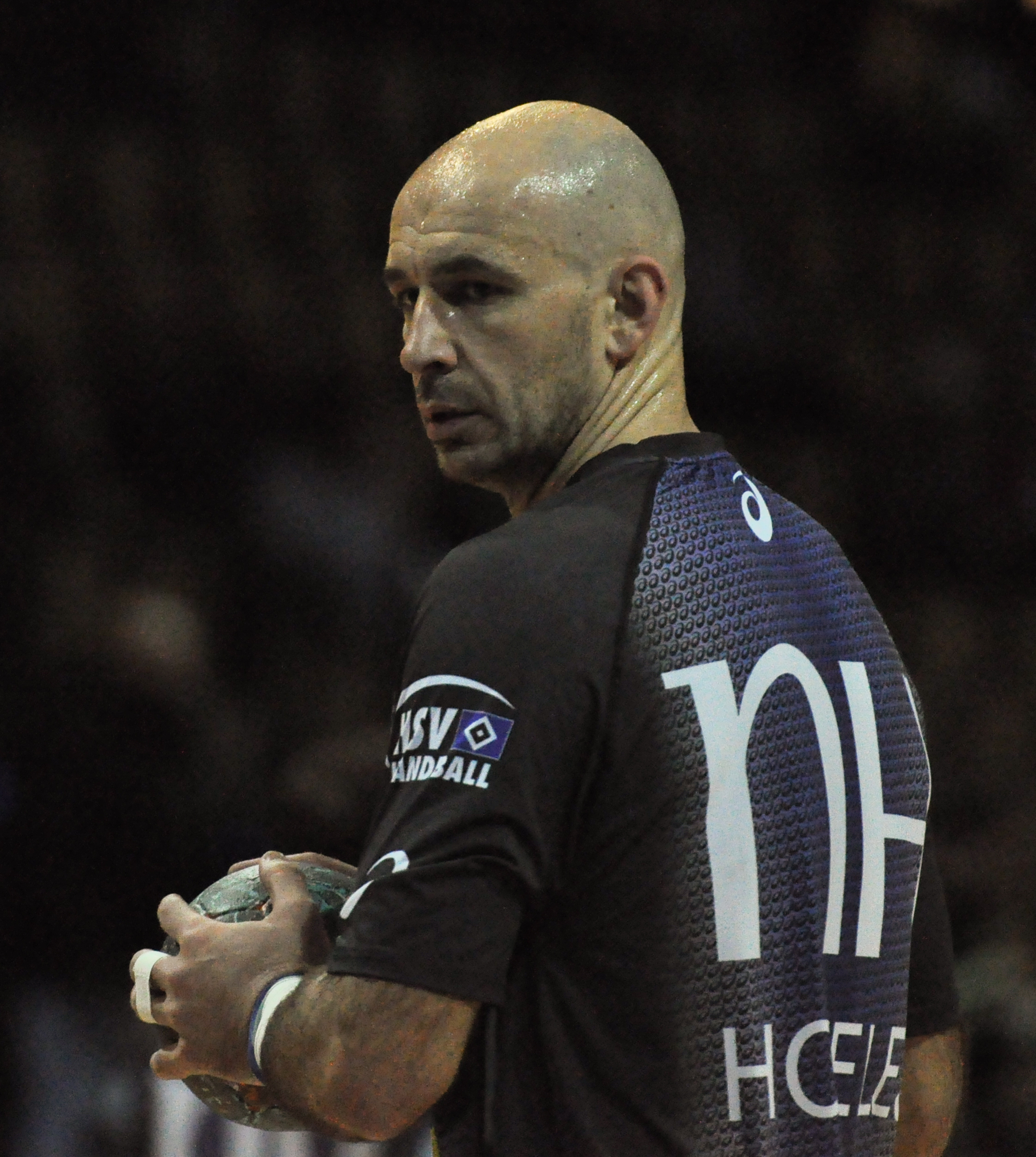
- Dominiković with HSV Hamburg in 2014

Personal information
- Nationality: Croatian
- Born: 7 April 1978 (age 48) Metković, SFR Yugoslavia
- Height: 2.03 m (6 ft 8 in)

Sport
- Sport: Handball
- Position: Left back
- Current club: TuS N-Lübbecke (head coach)

Senior clubs
- Years: Team
- 1995–1997: Metković Razvitak
- 1997–1999: Badel 1862 Zagreb
- 1999–2002: Metković Jambo
- 2002–2003: THW Kiel
- 2003–2004: SG Kronau-Östringen
- 2004: Algeciras BM
- 2004–2006: FC Barcelona
- 2006–2010: SDC San Antonio
- 2010–2011: PSG Handball
- 2011–2013: US Ivry Handball
- 2013–2016: HSV Hamburg
National team
Years	Team	Apps	(Gls)
1997–2008	Croatia	174	(205)

Teams managed
- 2017–2018: RK Dubrava (assistant)
- 2018–2019: Croatia (assistant)
- 2018–2019: MRK Sesvete
- 2019–2022: Croatia U21
- 2020–2025: TuS Vinnhorst
- 11/2025-: TuS N-Lübbecke
Medal record
Men's handball
Representing Croatia
Olympic Games
Gold medal – first place	2004 Athens	Team
World Championship
Gold medal – first place	2003 Portugal	Team
Silver medal – second place	2005 Tunisia	Team
Junior World Championship
Silver medal – second place	2019 Spain	Coach
Statoil World Cup
Gold medal – first place	2006 Sweden & Germany	Team
European Championship
Silver medal – second place	2008 Norway	Team
Mediterranean Games
Gold medal – first place	1997 Bari	Team
Gold medal – first place	2001 Tunis	Team

Davor Dominiković (born 7 April 1978) is a Croatian former professional handball player, who is the current handball coach for the Croatia national under-21 team & the German club TuS N-Lübbecke.

He is a world champion from the 2003 World Men's Handball Championship. He also competed for the Croatia national team at the 2004 Summer Olympics, where Croatia took gold.

== Career ==
Dominiković started his career at RK Metković, followed by RK Zagreb. Here he won the Croatian Championship and Cup in 1998 and 1999. He also reached the final of the 1997-98 and 1998-99 Champions League, but on both occasions he lost he final to FC Barcelona Handbol. In 1999 he returned to RK Metkotic, where he won the EHF Cup in 1999–20 on away goals to SG Flensburg-Handewitt. The season after he reached the final again, where they lost to SC Magdeburg.

In 2002 he joined German Bundesliga team THW Kiel, and a year later he signed for SG Kronau-Östringen. He joined Spanish second-tier side Algeciras BM in 2004, and later the same season he joined FC Barcelona Handbol. Here he won the 2004-05 EHF Champions League and the Liga ASOBAL 2004–05. For the 2006–07 season he joined Portland San Antonio.

In 2007 he was suspected of doping before the 2007 World Men's Handball Championship. It was however discovered that the Spanish authorities had mixed up the test samples. In 2014 he was awarded 150,000 € in damages in the Spanish court.

In 2010 he signed for French side Paris HB. After only a year he signed for league rivals US Ivry HB. In 2013 he was released of his contract with Ivry and joined HSV Hamburg. In November 2015 he joined HBW Balingen-Weilstetten, where he played for 2 seasons before retiring.

== Coaching Career ==
After retiring, he became the assistant coach at the Croatian team RK Dubrava. For the 2018–19 season he became the head coach of MRK Sesvete. The same year he became the Croatian U21 coach. After MRK Sesvete had a disastrous start to the 2019/20 season, Dominiković resigned from his coaching position in November 2019.

In 2020 he became the head coach of the German 3rd tier side TuS Vinnhorst. In 2023 he guided the team to promotion to the 2nd Handball-Bundesliga. A year later they were however relegated to the third tier again. He left Vinnhorst after the 2024–25 season.

In November 2025 he became the coach of the 2nd Bundesliga team TuS N-Lübbecke.

== Honours ==
Metković

- Croatian First League
  - Winner (1): 1999–00 (revoked)
  - Runner-up (2): 2000–01, 2001–02
- Croatian Handball Cup (2): 2001, 2002
- EHF Cup
  - Winner (1): 2000
  - Runner-up (1): 2001

Zagreb

- Croatian First League (2): 1997–98, 1998–99
- Croatian Handball Cup (2): 1998, 1999
- EHF Champions League
  - Runner-up (2): 1997–98, 1998–99

Barcelona

- Liga ASOBAL (1): 2005–06
- Pirenees Leagues (1): 2005–06
- EHF Champions League (1): 2004–05

San Antonio

- Liga ASOBAL
  - Runner-up (1): 2006–07

US Ivry

- French Cup
  - Runner-up (1): 2012

Individual

- Franjo Bučar State Award for Sport: 2004

== Orders ==
- Order of Danica Hrvatska with face of Franjo Bučar - 2004
