= Liga ASOBAL 1992–93 =

Liga ASOBAL
- Season: 1992–93
- Champions: Teka
- Relegated: Cero Colorias; Mepamsa San Antonio
- Top goalscorer: (Russia) Valery Gopin (219 goals)

Liga ASOBAL 1992–93 season was the third since its establishment. The league was played in a two phases. In the first phase, a total of 16 teams were separate in two groups of eight teams. The first five of every groups passed to the second phase for the title. The last three passed to the second phase for the permanence in Liga ASOBAL.

== First phase ==
=== Group A ===
	Team	P	W	D	L	G+	G−	Dif	Pts
1	Elgorriaga Bidasoa	14	12	0	2	358	278	80	24
2	Barcelona	14	10	0	4	343	281	62	20
3	Avidesa Alzira	14	8	1	5	309	308	1	17
4	Arcos Valladolid	14	8	0	6	298	305	–7	16
5	Juventud Alcalá	14	6	2	6	296	307	–11	14
6	Sdad Conquense	14	4	2	8	324	328	–4	10
7	CajaPontevedra	14	4	2	8	300	333	–33	10
8	Caserío Vigón	14	0	1	13	266	354	–88	1

Second Round (title)
Second Round (permanence)

=== Group B ===
	Team	P	W	D	L	G+	G−	Dif	Pts
1	Teka	14	12	1	1	381	309	72	25
2	Puleva Maristas	14	9	1	4	365	341	24	19
3	Cadagua Gáldar	14	7	3	4	354	327	27	17
4	Granollers	14	8	1	5	381	361	20	17
5	Atlético Madrid	14	7	1	6	320	317	3	15
6	Mepamsa San Antonio	14	4	4	6	327	332	–5	12
7	Alicante-Benidorm	14	2	1	11	305	351	–46	5
8	Cero Calorías	14	1	0	13	268	363	–95	2

Second Round (title)
Second Round (permanence)

== Second phase ==
=== Group I ===
	Team	P	W	D	L	G+	G−	Dif	Pts
1	Teka	18	15	1	2	465	404	61	31
2	Elgorriaga Bidasoa	18	13	1	4	443	388	55	27
3	Barcelona	18	13	1	4	443	376	67	27
4	Avidesa Alzira	18	12	0	6	449	429	20	24
5	Puleva Maristas	18	7	2	9	463	475	–13	16
6	Cadagua Gáldar	18	7	1	10	465	490	–25	15
7	Granollers	18	6	1	11	449	466	–17	13
8	Arcos Valladolid	18	4	2	12	392	432	–40	10
9	Atl. Madrid-Alcobendas	18	4	1	13	373	426	–53	9
10	Juventud Alcalá	18	4	0	14	381	437	–56	8

EHF Champions League
EHF Cup Winners' Cup
EHF Cup
EHF City Cup

=== Championship playoffs qualifying round ===
Semifinals
8	Arcos Valladolid	24	21	29
9	Atlético Madrid	25	19	18
7	Granollers	27	22
10	Juventud Alcalá	23	21

Finals
Qualified
Qualified

- Granollers & Arcos Valladolid won the qualifying round and advanced to quarterfinals.

=== Championship playoffs ===
quarter-finals
1	Teka	32	29	_
8	Arcos Valladolid	23	24	_
4	Avidesa Alzira	26	24	24
5	Puleva Alzira	23	28	22
2	Elgorriaga Bidasoa	24	15	_
7	Granollers	26	20	_
3	Barcelona	29	30	_
6	Cadagua Gáldar	24	22	_

semi-finals
1	Teka	30	24	_
4	Avidesa Alzira	25	23	_
7	Granollers	20	33	29
3	Barcelona	25	27	27

final
1	Teka	30	25	_
7	Granollers	29	22	_

1992–93 Liga ASOBAL winners
(Cantabria)
Teka
First title

=== Group II ===
	Team	P	W	D	L	G+	G−	Dif	Pts
11	CajaPontevedra	15	11	2	2	360	334	26	24
12	Mepamsa San Antonio	15	7	4	4	352	309	43	18
13	Alicante-Benidorm	15	7	4	4	343	328	15	18
14	Sdad Conquense	15	7	4	4	364	337	27	18
15	Cero Calorías	15	4	1	10	306	349	–43	9
16	Caserío Vigón	15	1	1	13	291	359	–68	3

In–Out promotion
Relegated

- Mepamsa San Antonio was relegated to Primera División Nacional due to financial troubles.
- Later, Caserío Vigón became BM Ciudad Real and remained in Liga ASOBAL due to vacant seats.

=== In–Out promotion ===
==== 1st leg ====
May 23, 1993	Alicante-Benidorm	25–24	JD Arrate

May 23, 1993	Ademar León	24–26	Sociedad Conquense

==== 2nd leg ====
May 30, 1993	JD Arrate	18–25	Alicante-Benidorm

May 30, 1993	Sociedad Conquense	33–20	Ademar León

- Alicante-Benidorm & Sociedad Conquense remained in Liga ASOBAL. But Alicante-Benidorm is finally dissolved, so that JD Arrate is promoted.

== Top goal scorers ==
Player	Goals	Team
(Russia) Valery Gopin	162	Puleva Maristas
(Russia) Vladislav Kalarash	132	Elgorriaga Bidasoa
(Spain) Antonio Carlos Ortega	115	Puleva Maristas
(Federal Republic of Yugoslavia) Zoran Tomić	111	Arcos Valladolid
(Spain) Mateo Garralda	111	Teka Santander
