= Samuel Trives =

Spanish handball player (born 1972)

Personal information
- Full name: Samuel Trives Trejo
- Born: 8 November 1972 (age 53) Madrid, Spain
- Height: 180 cm (71 in)

Sport
- Sport: Handball
- Position: Right wing

Senior clubs
- Years: Team
- –: Club Juventud Alcalá
- –1996: CB Cantabria
- 1996–2005: BM Ciudad Real
- 2005–2005: BM Alcobendas
National team
| Years | Team | Apps | (Gls) |
| 1993–1999 | Spain | 81 | (167) |

Samuel Trives Trejo (born November 8, 1972, in Madrid, Spain) is a former Spanish handball player. He played mostly for BM Alcobendas & BM Ciudad Real. His usual position was right winger. Currently he trains a Spanish handball team called Bacovi. Nowadays he trains handball on the Selection of Madrid of handball.

== Clubs ==
- Club Juventud Alcalá
- CB Cantabria
- BM Ciudad Real
- BM Alcobendas

== Trophies ==
- Liga ASOBAL: 2
  - 1995 and 2004
- EHF Champions League: 2
  - 2002 and 2003
- Copa del Rey: 2
  - 1995 and 2003
- Copa ASOBAL: 1
  - 2004
- Spanish Super Cup: 1
  - 2005
- European Super Cup: 2
  - 2002 and 2003
- 2ª Nacional Cup
  - 2017 2018 5º Bacovi (Coach)
