= Dominiković =

Dominiković is a surname, derived from the given name Dominic. Notable people with the surname include:

- Danielle Dominikovic (born 1987), Australian tennis player
- Davor Dominiković (born 1978), Croatian handball player
- Evie Dominikovic (born 1980), Australian tennis player
