= Vuk Milošević =

Montenegrin handball player (born 1987)

Personal information
- Nationality: Montenegrin
- Born: 30 November 1987 (age 38) Šabac, Serbia
- Height: 1.92 m (6 ft 4 in)

Sport
- Sport: Handball
- Position: Centre back
- Current club: SCM Politehnica Timișoara
- Number: 6

Senior clubs
- Years: Team
- –: SD Teucro
- –: Algeciras BM
- –: Escubal Badajoz
- –: RK Lovćen
- –: RK Budvanska Rivijera
- 2012–2013: Teramo Handball
- 2013–2014: BM Ciudad Encantada
- 2014–2015: Al-Gharafa
- 2015–2016: Bursa Nilüfer BK
- 2016–: SCM Politehnica Timișoara

Vuk Milošević (born 30 November 1987) is a Montenegrin handball player who plays for the Romanian club SCM Politehnica Timișoara.

== Individual awards ==
- Serie A - 1ª Divisione Nazionale Top Scorer: 2013

== Personal life ==
He is the son of Pero Milošević.
