= Liga ASOBAL 1996–97 =

Spanish handball season

Liga ASOBAL 1996–97 season was the seventh since its establishment. The league was played in a round-robin format through 30 rounds. The team with most points earned was the champion. On the contrary, teams from 14th to 16th were relegated and teams in 12th and 13th position had to play the in–out playoff.

== Overall standing ==
Pos	Team	Pld	W	D	L	GF	GA	GD	Pts	Qualification or relegation
1	Barcelona	30	28	0	2	993	709	+284	56	EHF Champions League
2	Prosesa Ademar León	30	22	4	4	848	739	+109	48	EHF Champions League
3	Caja Cantabria	30	20	2	8	841	724	+117	42	EHF Cup Winners' Cup
4	Valladolid	30	17	4	9	835	812	+23	38	EHF Cup
5	Elgorriaga Bidasoa	30	17	3	10	760	710	+50	37	EHF Cup Winners' Cup
6	Pilotes Posada	30	15	6	9	860	853	+7	36	EHF City Cup
7	Cadagua Gáldar	30	16	2	12	874	832	+42	34	
8	Quesos Castilseras	30	13	4	13	815	815	0	30	
9	Lagun Aro S.A.	30	10	6	14	683	753	−70	26	
10	Frigorificos Morrazo	30	9	6	15	704	778	−74	24	
11	Granollers	30	11	1	18	693	730	−37	23	
12	Barakaldo UPV	30	7	6	17	773	898	−125	20	In–Out playoff
13	Pescanova Chapela	30	8	4	18	697	743	−46	20	In–Out playoff
14	CajaPontevedra	30	6	7	17	781	833	−52	19	Relegated
15	PRASA Pozoblanco	30	6	6	18	770	852	−82	18	Relegated
16	Eresa Valencia	30	3	3	24	723	869	−146	9	Relegated

1996–97 Liga ASOBAL winners
(Catalonia)
Barcelona
Fourth title

=== In–Out playoff ===
relegation playoff
Pescanova Chapela	24	24	48
Ivesur Málaga	22	26	48

- Pescanova Chapela remained in Liga ASOBAL.

In–Out playoff
Altea	29	24	53
Barakaldo UPV	24	27	51

- Barakaldo UPV relegated to División de Honor B. Altea promoted to Liga ASOBAL.

== Top goal scorers ==
Player	Goals	Team
(Socialist Federal Republic of Yugoslavia) Dragan Škrbić	¿?	Prosesa Ademar León
