= Liga ASOBAL 1990–91 =

Liga ASOBAL
- Season: 1990–91
- Champions: Barcelona
- Relegated: Platano Canarias; Ceset Naranco
- Top goalscorer: (Serbia) Zlatko Portner (256 goals)

Liga ASOBAL 1990–91 was the first season of Liga ASOBAL. ASOBAL's governing body was established on May 18, 1990. The league was played in a two phases. In the first phase, a total of 16 teams were separate in two groups of eight teams. The first five of every groups passed to the second phase for the title. The last three passed to the second phase for the permanence in Liga ASOBAL.

== First phase ==
=== Group A ===
	Team	P	W	D	L	G+	G−	Dif	Pts
1	Barcelona	14	13	0	1	395	302	93	26
2	Avidesa Alzira	14	12	0	2	380	319	61	24
3	Cacaolat Granollers	14	8	1	5	333	315	18	17
4	Xerox Arrate	14	7	0	7	296	290	6	14
5	Mepamsa San Antonio	14	5	0	9	305	358	–53	10
6	CajaPontevedra	14	4	1	9	318	340	–22	9
7	Plátano Canarias	14	4	0	10	286	356	–70	8
8	Ceset Naranco	14	2	0	12	277	313	–36	4

Second Round (title)
Second Round (permanence)

=== Group B ===
	Team	P	W	D	L	G+	G−	Dif	Pts
1	Atlético Madrid	14	12	0	2	338	249	89	26
2	Teka	14	11	2	1	356	285	71	24
3	Elgorriaga Bidasoa	14	8	2	4	313	286	27	17
4	Cajamadrid	14	7	1	6	343	327	16	14
5	Helados Alacant	14	6	0	8	343	371	–28	10
6	Puleva Maristas	14	5	0	9	299	339	–40	9
7	Michelin Valladolid	14	2	1	11	298	364	–66	8
8	Tenerife 3 Mayo	14	2	0	12	306	375	–69	4

Second Round (title)
Second Round (permanence)

== Second phase ==
=== Group I ===
	Team	P	W	D	L	G+	G−	Dif	Pts
1	Barcelona	18	15	0	3	452	368	84	30
2	Teka	18	12	2	4	417	368	49	26
3	Atlético Madrid	18	12	1	5	391	368	23	25
4	Elgorriaga Bidasoa	18	11	2	5	411	390	21	24
5	Avidesa Alzira	18	7	3	8	428	423	5	17
6	Cajamadrid	18	6	2	10	413	439	–26	14
7	Cacaolat Granollers	18	6	2	10	428	465	–37	14
8	Mepamsa San Antonio	18	6	1	11	382	410	–28	13
9	Helados Alacant	18	4	2	12	388	418	–30	10
10	Xerox Arrate	18	3	1	14	362	423	–61	7

EHF Champions League
EHF Cup Winners' Cup; As Copa del Rey winner
EHF Cup; As Copa ASOBAL runner-up

1990–91 Liga ASOBAL winners
(Catalonia)
Barcelona
First title

=== Group II ===
	Team	P	W	D	L	G+	G−	Dif	Pts
1	CajaPontevedra	15	9	2	4	349	347	2	20
2	Puelva Maristas	15	9	1	5	345	303	42	19
3	Tenerife 3 Mayo	15	8	2	5	384	376	8	18
4	Michelin Valladolid	15	6	1	8	348	363	–15	13
5	Platano Canarias	15	6	1	8	340	354	–14	13
6	Ceset Naranco	15	3	1	11	312	335	–23	7

In–Out promotion
Relegated

=== In–Out promotion ===
==== 1st leg ====
June 2, 1991	Tenerife 3 Mayo	31–22	Cajasur Córdoba

June 2, 1991	Michelin Valladolid	25–25	Caserío Vigón

==== 2nd leg ====
June 9, 1991	Cajasur Córdoba	27–24	Tenerife 3 Mayo

June 9, 1991	Caserío Vigón	15–18	Michelin Valladolid

- Tenerife 3 de Mayo & Michelin Valladolid remained in Liga ASOBAL.

== Top goal scorers ==
Top scorers are:

Player	Goals	Team
(Socialist Federal Republic of Yugoslavia) Zlatko Portner	256	Barcelona
(Socialist Federal Republic of Yugoslavia) Zoran Puzović	232	Cajamadrid
(Socialist Federal Republic of Yugoslavia) Veselin Vujović	198	Barcelona
(Iceland) Alfreð Gíslason	197	Elgorriaga Bidasoa
(Socialist Federal Republic of Yugoslavia) Pero Milošević	174	Helados Alacant
(Spain) Iván Alemany	173	Avidesa Alzira
(Poland) Bogdan Wenta	170	Elgorriaga Bidasoa
(Soviet Union) Oleg Lvov	168	Mepamsa San Antonio
(Spain) Antonio Ortega	163	Puleva Maristas
(Romania) Vasile Stîngă	153	Avidesa Alzira
