= Liga ASOBAL 1991–92 =

Liga ASOBAL
- Season: 1991–92
- Champions: Barcelona
- Relegated: Guadalajara; JD Arrate
- Top goalscorer: (Russia) Valery Gopin (227 goals)

Liga ASOBAL 1991–92 season was the second since its establishment. The league was played in a two phases. In the first phase, a total of 16 teams were separate in two groups of eight teams. The first four of every groups passed to the second phase for the title. The last four passed to the second phase for the permanence in Liga ASOBAL.

== First phase ==
=== Group A ===
| | Team | P | W | D | L | G+ | G− | Dif | Pts |
|---|---|---|---|---|---|---|---|---|---|
| 1 | Elgorriaga Bidasoa | 14 | 11 | 1 | 2 | 354 | 322 | 32 | 23 |
| 2 | Barcelona | 14 | 10 | 2 | 2 | 353 | 291 | 62 | 22 |
| 3 | Granollers | 14 | 9 | 3 | 2 | 378 | 327 | 51 | 21 |
| 4 | Avidesa Alzira | 14 | 8 | 2 | 4 | 351 | 330 | 21 | 18 |
| 5 | Arcos Valladolid | 14 | 5 | 2 | 7 | 356 | 370 | –14 | 12 |
| 6 | Puleva Maristas | 14 | 3 | 1 | 10 | 353 | 382 | –29 | 7 |
| 7 | Sdad Conquense | 14 | 2 | 2 | 10 | 326 | 365 | –39 | 6 |
| 8 | Xerox Arrate | 14 | 1 | 1 | 12 | 293 | 377 | –84 | 3 |

| Second Round (title) |
| Second Round (permanence) |

=== Group B ===
| | Team | P | W | D | L | G+ | G− | Dif | Pts |
|---|---|---|---|---|---|---|---|---|---|
| 1 | Teka | 14 | 12 | 0 | 2 | 376 | 298 | 78 | 24 |
| 2 | Atlético Madrid | 14 | 9 | 1 | 4 | 295 | 271 | 24 | 19 |
| 3 | CajaPontevedra | 14 | 8 | 0 | 6 | 318 | 318 | 0 | 16 |
| 4 | Mepamsa San Antonio | 14 | 7 | 1 | 6 | 339 | 348 | –9 | 15 |
| 5 | Gáldar 3 de Mayo | 14 | 6 | 1 | 7 | 324 | 339 | –15 | 13 |
| 6 | Juventud Alcalá | 14 | 5 | 2 | 7 | 308 | 330 | –22 | 12 |
| 7 | Helados Alacant | 14 | 3 | 1 | 10 | 333 | 357 | –24 | 7 |
| 8 | Guadalajara | 14 | 3 | 0 | 11 | 299 | 331 | –32 | 6 |

| Second Round (title) |
| Second Round (permanence) |

== Second phase ==
=== Group I ===
| | Team | P | W | D | L | G+ | G− | Dif | Pts |
|---|---|---|---|---|---|---|---|---|---|
| 1 | Barcelona | 14 | 11 | 1 | 2 | 320 | 270 | 50 | 23 |
| 2 | Granollers | 14 | 7 | 3 | 4 | 374 | 333 | 41 | 17 |
| 3 | Atlético Madrid | 14 | 8 | 1 | 5 | 293 | 281 | 12 | 17 |
| 4 | Avidesa Alzira | 14 | 7 | 2 | 5 | 331 | 301 | 30 | 16 |
| 5 | Teka | 14 | 6 | 3 | 5 | 320 | 320 | 0 | 15 |
| 6 | CajaPontevedra | 14 | 5 | 2 | 7 | 326 | 358 | –32 | 12 |
| 7 | Elgorriaga Bidasoa | 14 | 2 | 3 | 9 | 275 | 328 | –53 | 7 |
| 8 | Mepamsa San Antonio | 14 | 2 | 1 | 11 | 305 | 353 | –48 | 5 |

| EHF Champions League |
| EHF Cup Winners' Cup; As Copa del Rey winner |
| EHF Cup; As Copa ASOBAL winner |

1991–92 Liga ASOBAL winners
(Catalonia)
Barcelona
Second title

=== Group II ===
| | Team | P | W | D | L | G+ | G− | Dif | Pts |
|---|---|---|---|---|---|---|---|---|---|
| 9 | Puelva Maristas | 14 | 9 | 4 | 1 | 380 | 319 | 61 | 22 |
| 10 | Arcos Valladolid | 14 | 10 | 0 | 4 | 351 | 333 | 18 | 20 |
| 11 | Juventud Alcalá | 14 | 8 | 0 | 6 | 316 | 306 | 10 | 16 |
| 12 | Gáldar Tres Mayo | 14 | 5 | 4 | 5 | 338 | 341 | –3 | 14 |
| 13 | Helados Alacant | 14 | 5 | 3 | 6 | 309 | 322 | –13 | 13 |
| 14 | Sdad. Conquense | 14 | 4 | 4 | 6 | 335 | 338 | –3 | 12 |
| 15 | Guadalajara | 14 | 3 | 6 | 5 | 293 | 309 | –16 | 12 |
| 16 | Xerox Arrate | 14 | 1 | 1 | 12 | 293 | 347 | –54 | 3 |

| In–Out promotion |
| Relegated |

=== In–Out promotion ===
==== 1st leg ====
| May 9, 1992 | Villa de Avilés | 20–18 | Helados Alacant |

| May 10, 1992 | Altea | 23–27 | Sociedad Conquense |

==== 2nd leg ====
| May 17, 1992 | Helados Alacant | 28–22 | Villa de Avilés |

| May 17, 1992 | Sociedad Conquense | 29–19 | Altea |

- Helados Alacant & Sociedad Conquense remained in Liga ASOBAL.

== Top goal scorers ==
| Player | Goals | Team |
|---|---|---|
| (Soviet Union) Valery Gopin | 227 | Puleva Maristas |
| (Denmark) Kim Gronnemose | 193 | Sdad Conquense |
| (Spain) Juan Alemany | 177 | Avidesa Alzira |
| (Poland) Bogdan Wenta | 163 | Elgorriaga Bidasoa |
| (Spain) Eugenio Rodríguez | 152 | CajaPontevedra |
| (Soviet Union) Oleg Lvov | 152 | Mepamsa San Antonio |
| (Socialist Federal Republic of Yugoslavia) Zoran Puzović | 149 | Juventud Alcalá |
| (Finland) Jan Rönnberg | 145 | Gáldar Tres de Mayo |
| (Spain) Juan Carlos Auserón | 144 | Arcos Valladolid |
| (Spain) Jordi Fernández | 143 | Granollers |
