= Liga ASOBAL 1995–96 =

Liga ASOBAL 1995–96 season was the sixth since its establishment. The league was played in a round-robin format through 30 rounds. The team with most points earned was the champion. On the contrary, teams in 12th & 13th position had to play the permanence playoff, and teams in 14th & 15th position had to play the relegation playoff.

== First phase ==
=== Overall standing ===
Pos	Team	Pld	W	D	L	GF	GA	GD	Pts	Qualification or relegation
1	Barcelona	30	29	0	1	956	663	+293	58	EHF Champions League
2	Cantabria	30	22	1	7	840	721	+119	45	EHF Champions League
3	Elgorriaga Bidasoa	30	20	4	6	740	670	+70	44	EHF Cup Winners' Cup
4	Academia Octavio	30	19	5	6	879	822	+57	43	EHF Cup
5	Granollers	30	19	1	10	815	741	+74	39	EHF Cup
6	Prosesa Ademar Léon	30	17	1	12	821	735	+86	35	EHF City Cup
7	CajaPontevedra	30	14	6	10	812	741	+71	34	
8	Valladolid	30	15	2	13	845	835	+10	32	
9	Cadagua Gáldar	30	12	6	12	835	856	−21	30	
10	Avirresa Guadalajara (Note: Avirresa Guadalajara was relegated due to financial constraints and Eresa Valencia retained its seat in Liga ASOBAL.)	30	11	3	16	644	735	−91	25	Relegated
11	Lagun Aro San Antonio	30	11	2	17	643	696	−53	24	
12	Ciudad Real	30	10	4	16	754	780	−26	24	permanence playoff
13	Cangas Frigorificos Morrazo	30	9	5	16	704	733	−29	23	permanence playoff
14	CajaBilbao UPV Barakaldo	30	4	2	24	733	895	−162	10	relegation playoff
15	Conquense (Note: Conquense was relegated due to financial constraints and CajaBilbao UPV Barakaldo retained its seat in Liga ASOBAL.)	30	3	2	25	609	807	−198	8	relegation playoff
16	Eresa Valencia	30	2	2	26	659	859	−200	6	

Notes:

1995–96 Liga ASOBAL winners
(Catalonia)
Barcelona
Third title

== Second phase ==
=== permanence promotion ===
permanence playoff
12	Ciudad Real	24	28	27	26	30
13	Cangas Frigorificos Morrazo	21	30	20	27	29

- Ciudad Real remained in Liga ASOBAL. Cangas Frigorificos Morrazo played In–Out promotion.

=== relegation promotion ===
relegation playoff
14	CajaBilbao UPV Barakaldo	19	22	20	20
15	Conquense	21	23	19	22

- Conquense played In–Out playoff. CajaBilbao UPV Barakaldo relegated. Later, BM Conquense was relegated due to financial constraints and CajaBilbao UPV Barakaldo regained its seat in Liga ASOBAL.

=== In–Out playoff ===
relegation playoff
Ivesur Málaga	31	22	53
Cangas Frigorificos Morrazo	29	27	56

- Cangas Frigorificos del Morrazo remained in Liga ASOBAL.

In–Out playoff
Conquense	25	22	47
Carnes Toledo	16	25	41

- Conquense remained in Liga ASOBAL. Later, BM Conquense was relegated due to financial constraints and CajaBilbao UPV Barakaldo regained its seat in Liga ASOBAL.
