= Mateo Garralda =

Spanish handball player (born 1969)

Personal information
- Full name: Mateo Jesús Garralda Larumbe
- Nationality: Spanish
- Born: 1 December 1969 (age 56) Burlada, Spain
- Height: 1.96 m (6 ft 5 in)

Sport
- Sport: Handball
- Position: Right back
- Current club: Albatro Siracusa

Senior clubs
- Years: Team
- –1986: BM Burlada
- 1986–1991: BM Granollers
- 1991–1992: Atlético Madrid BM
- 1992–1996: Teka Cantabria
- 1996–1999: FC Barcelona
- 1999–2006: Portland San Antonio
- 2006–2008: Ademar León
- 2008–2011: KIF Kolding
- 2011–2012: BM Guadalajara
National team
Years	Team	Apps	(Gls)
1998-2012	Spain	233	(593)

Teams managed
- 2012–2014: BM Guadalajara
- 2014–2015: Știința Dedeman Bacău
- 2016–2022: Chile
- 2022–2023: Zamalek H.C
- 2023–: Albatro Siracusa
Medal record
Summer Olympics
Bronze medal – third place	1996 Atlanta	Team
Bronze medal – third place	2000 Sydney	Team
World Championship
Gold medal – first place	2005 Tunisia
European Championship
Silver medal – second place	1996 Spain
Silver medal – second place	1998 Italy
Silver medal – second place	2006 Switzerland
Bronze medal – third place	2000 Croatia

Mateo Jesús Garralda Larumbe (born 1 December 1969) is a Spanish retired handballer and the current head coach of italian club Albatro Siracusa.

== Career ==
Garralda started playing handball in his hometown club BM Burlada. He then joined BM Granollers where he played his first league match. In 1991 he joined Atlético Madrid BM for one season before joining Teka Cantabria. Here he won the Spanish Championship, Spanish Supercup, the EHF European League, EHF Champions League, Copa ASOBAL, IHF Super Globe and the EHF Cup Winners' Cup.

In 1996 he joined FC Barcelona, where he once again won the Spanish Championship, Spanish Supercup and the EHF Champions League.

In 1999 after having a disagreement with his coach, he joined Portland San Antonio, where he won the 2000 EHF Cup Winners' Cup, 2001 Copa del Rey and Champions League and the 2002 and 2005 Spanish league.

In 2006 at the age of 37 he joined Ademar León. In 2008 he joined Danish side KIF Kolding. Here he won the Danish championship, Herrehåndboldligaen, in 2009. In 2011 he left Kolding, due to the club's bad economy. He then joined BM Guadalajara for a single season before retiring.

He is one of only 5 players who has one the EHF Champions League with 3 different clubs, and only the third to do so.

=== National team ===
He competed in four Olympics; the 1992 Summer Olympics, in the 1996 Summer Olympics, where the team took bronze medals, in the 2000 Summer Olympics, and in the 2004 Summer Olympics. At the 2005 World Championship he was on the team, that won gold medals, the first ever for Spain.

At the 2007 World Championship he finished 7th with Spain, losing to Germany in the quarterfinal.

== Coaching career ==
From 2012 he became the head coach of AD Ciudad de Guadalajara. In 2014 he moved to Romanian Știința Municipal Dedeman Bacău

Between 2016 and 2022 he was the coach of the Chilean national team.

Afterwards he joined Egyptian top club Zamalek. In June 2023 he was for a short while the coach of Saudi Arabian Mudhar. Only four months later he moved to Italy and became the head coach of Albatro Siracusa.

== Achievements ==
- Liga ASOBAL:
  - Winner: 1993, 1994, 1996, 1997, 1998, 1999, 2002, 2005
- Supercopa de España:
  - Winner: 1993, 1997, 1998
- Copa del Rey:
  - Winner: 1997, 1998, 2001
- Jack & Jones Ligaen:
  - Winner: 2009
- Copa ASOBAL:
  - Winner: 1995, 1996
- EHF Champions League:
  - Winner: 1994, 1996, 1997, 1998, 1999, 2001
- EHF Champions Trophy:
  - Winner: 1996, 1997, 1998, 2000
- EHF Cup Winners' Cup:
  - Winner: 1995, 2000, 2004
- EHF Cup:
  - Winner: 1993
- World Championship:
  - Gold Medalist: 2005
- European Championship:
  - Silve Medalist: 1996, 1998, 2006
  - Bronze Medalist: 2000
- Summer Olympics:
  - Bronze Medalist: 1996, 2000

== Individual awards ==
- All-Star Right Back of the World Championship: 1993, 2005

== Decorations ==
- Royal Order of Sports Merit: 2013
