= BM Ciudad Encantada =

Spanish handball club

Rebi Balonmano Cuenca
- Full name: Rebi Balonmano Cuenca
- Founded: 1989; 37 years ago
- Arena: Pabellón Municipal El Sargal, Cuenca
- Capacity: 1,900
- President: Isidoro Gómez Cavero
- Head coach: Lidio Jiménez Carrascosa
- League: Liga ASOBAL
- 2024-25: 10th
Home	Away

Rebi Balonmano Cuenca is a team of handball based in Cuenca, Spain. It plays in Liga ASOBAL.

Location of Rebi Balonmano Cuenca

== History ==
Balonmano Ciudad Encantada was established in 1989 when acquired the TNT Uniexpress's seat, a team from San Sebastián de los Reyes, Madrid, relocating the team to Cuenca and renaming it as Madrid-Cuenca. Since then, the team has undergone several name changes. Since 2008, they have been playing continuously in the first division, Liga ASOBAL. The team finished fifth in 2018 and qualified for a European cup, the EHF Cup, for the first time. The team reached the final of the Copa del Rey in 2019 and the final of the Supercopa ASOBAL in 2020.

== Crest, colours, supporters ==
=== Naming history ===
Name	Period
Madrid-Cuenca	1989−1990
Sociedad Conquense	1990–1994
Balonmano Conquense	1994–1997
Balonmano Ciudad Encantada	1997–2008
Cuenca 2016	2008–2011
Balonmano Ciudad Encantada	2011–2012
GlobalCaja Ciudad Encantada	2012–2016
LiberbankCiudad Encantada	2016–2018
Liberbank Cuenca	2018–2019
Incarlopsa Cuenca	2019–2022
Rebi Balonmano Cuenca	2022–present

=== Kit manufacturers ===
Period	Kit manufacturer
2020	(Denmark) Hummel
2020 - present	(Spain) Joma

=== Kits ===
HOME
2017-18	2018-19	2020-21	2022-23

AWAY
2018–19	2020-21	2022-23

THIRD

2020-21

== Team ==
=== Current squad ===
Squad for the 2022–23 season

Rebi Balonmano Cuenca

Goalkeepers

- 9 (Spain) Marcos Herráiz Lopez
- 12 (Tunisia) Fraj Ben Tekaya
- 16 (Bosnia and Herzegovina) (Croatia) Ante Grbavac

Left Wingers

- 7 (Argentina) Ignacio Pizarro
- 25 (Spain) Arnau Fernández Guzmán

Right Wingers

- 14 (Italy) Leo Prantner
- 20 (Spain) Ignacio Moya Del Saz (c)
- 30 (Argentina) Federico Pizarro

Line Players

- 8 (Spain) Álvaro Martín Noeda
- 17 (Brazil) Alexandro Pozzer
- 24 (Spain) Diego Vera Chaves

Central Backs

- 2 (Brazil) Henrique Teixeira
- 3 (Spain) Sergi Mach
- 44 (Spain) Jaime Colmena

Left Backs

- 4 (Argentina) Pablo Simonet
- 5 (Portugal) Daniel Neves
- 15 (Spain) Carlos Fernández Sanchez
- 19 (Spain) Juan José Fernández

Right Backs

- 55 (Portugal) Joaquim Nazaré

=== Technical staff ===
- Head coach: (Spain) Lidio Jiménez Carrascosa
- Assistant coach: (Argentina) Juan Manuel Doldán

=== Transfers ===
Transfers for the 2026–27 season

Joining

- (Portugal) Miguel Pinto (RW) from (North Macedonia) RK Vardar
- (Hungary) Gábor Décsi (GK) from (Spain) BM Huesca
- (Spain) Jan Blas (RW) from (Spain) FC Barcelona

Leaving

- (Colombia) Santiago Mosquera Mayo (LB) to (Australia) Sydney University Handball Club
- (Portugal) Afonso Freire Mendes (RW) loan back to (Portugal) S.L. Benfica

=== Transfer History ===
Transfers for the 2025–26 season

Joining

- (Argentina) Lucas Moscariello (LP) from (Kuwait) Al-Arabi SC
- (Italy) Enrico Aldini (LP) from (Italy) Handball Sassari
- (Canada) (Spain) Daniel Arguillas (GK) from (Spain) BM Huesca
- (Hungary) Rajmond Tóth (CB) from (Spain) CB Cangas
- (Portugal) Manuel Lima (CB) from (France) Saran Loiret Handball
- (Colombia) Santiago Mosquera Mayo (LB) back from loan at (Spain) BM Villa de Aranda
- (Portugal) Afonso Freire Mendes (RW) on loan from (Portugal) S.L. Benfica
- (Spain) Diego Gándara (LP) on loan from (Spain) Balonmano Torrelavega

Leaving

- (Brazil) Rudolph Hackbarth (RW) to (North Macedonia) RK Eurofarm Pelister
- (Brazil) Alexandro Pozzer (LP) to (Spain) BM Puerto Sagunto
- (Democratic Republic of the Congo) Aurélien Tchitombi (CB) to (Spain) BM Huesca
- (Portugal) Daniel Neves (LB) to (Hungary) HE-DO B. Braun Gyöngyös
- (Spain) David Mach Eijo (GK) to (Spain) BM Benidorm
- (Spain) Sergi Mach Eijo (CB) to (Spain) CB Caserío Ciudad Real
- (Spain) Sergio López García (LW) to (Spain) CB Caserío Ciudad Real
- (Spain) Jorge Ureña Ramos (RW) on loan at (Spain) Balonmano Base Oviedo

Transfers for the 2022–23 season

Joining

- (Brazil) Henrique Teixeira (CB) from (Romania) CSM București
- (Portugal) Daniel Neves (LB) from (Spain) BM Cisne
- (Tunisia) Fraj Ben Tekaya (GK) from (Tunisia) AS Téboulba
- (Spain) Juan José Fernández (LB) from (France) Istres Provence Handball
- (Spain) Diego Vera Chaves (LP) from (Spain) CB Burgos

Leaving

- (Italy) Davide Bulzamini (LB) to (Italy) SSV Brixen Handball
- (Argentina) (Italy) Martín Ariel Doldan (LP) to (Spain) CB Eón Alicante
- (Brazil) Thiago Ponciano (LB) to (France) US Créteil Handball
- (Spain) Samuel Ibáñez (GK) to (Spain) BM Benidorm
- (Spain) Hugo López Ortega (LW) to (Spain) BM Melilla Sport

== Previous squads ==
2018–2019 Team
Shirt No	Nationality	Player	Birth Date	Position
2	Argentina	Pablo Vainstein	18 July 1989 (age 37)	Right Back
3	Brazil	Leonardo Dutra	29 March 1996 (age 30)	Left Back
6	ArgentinaItaly	Martín Ariel Doldan	31 January 1987 (age 39)	Line Player
7	Spain	Natan Suárez	20 January 1998 (age 28)	Central Back
8	Spain	David Mendoza Gómez	22 November 1982 (age 44)	Line Player
9	Argentina	Santiago Baronetto	22 October 1992 (age 34)	Right Winger
10	Spain	Hugo Lopez Ortega	7 May 1992 (age 34)	Left Winger
11	Argentina	Lucas Moscariello	19 February 1992 (age 34)	Line Player
13	Brazil	Thiago Ponciano	8 May 1994 (age 32)	Left Back
20	Spain	Adrian Nolasco Macia	24 May 1993 (age 33)	Left Back
23	Spain	Oscar Rio Rasillo	21 July 1980 (age 46)	Central Back
24	Spain	Francisco Javier Castro	10 September 1996 (age 30)	Central Back
26	Croatia	Kristian Eskeričić	2 June 1994 (age 32)	Left Winger
28	Spain	Sergio López García	30 September 1997 (age 29)	Left Winger
32	Spain	Kilian Garajonay Ramirez Santana	2 June 1998 (age 28)	Goalkeeper
33	Spain	Ángel Montoro	10 April 1989 (age 37)	Right Back
40	Argentina	Leonel Maciel	4 January 1989 (age 37)	Goalkeeper
82	Spain	Alejandro Taravilla	13 December 2001 (age 24)	Line Player

== Season by season ==
Season	Tier	Division	Pos.	Notes
1989–90	1	Honor	15th	Relegated
1990–91	2	1ª Nacional	1st / 2nd	Promoted
1991–92	1	ASOBAL	14th	
1992–93	1	ASOBAL	14th	
1993–94	1	ASOBAL	10th	
1994–95	1	ASOBAL	14th	
1995–96	1	ASOBAL	15th	Relegated
1996–97	2	Honor B	7th	
1997–98	2	Honor B	9th	
1998–99	2	Honor B	10th / 10th	
1999–00	2	Honor B	15th	Relegated
2000–01	3	1ª Nacional	11th (Group C)	
2001–02	3	1ª Nacional	6th (Group D)	
2002–03	3	1ª Nacional	1st (Group D)	
2003–04	3	1ª Nacional	2nd (Group D)	
2004–05	3	1ª Nacional	2nd (Group D)	Promoted
2005–06	2	Honor B	7th	
2006–07	2	Honor B	7th	

Season	Tier	Division	Pos.	Notes
2007–08	2	Honor B	2nd	Promoted
2008–09	1	ASOBAL	13th	
2009–10	1	ASOBAL	10th	
2010–11	1	ASOBAL	8th	
2011–12	1	ASOBAL	6th	
2012–13	1	ASOBAL	10th	
2013–14	1	ASOBAL	6th	
2014–15	1	ASOBAL	14th	
2015–16	1	ASOBAL	13th	
2016–17	1	ASOBAL	6th	
2017–18	1	ASOBAL	5th	
2018–19	1	ASOBAL	8th	
2019–20	1	ASOBAL	5th	
2020–21	1	ASOBAL	6th	
2021–22	1	ASOBAL	5th	
2022–23	1	ASOBAL	2nd	
2023–24	1	ASOBAL	13th	
2024–25	1	ASOBAL	10th	

== EHF ranking ==
As of 10/22/2026

Rank	Team	Points
187	(Slovenia) RK Slovenj Gradec	13
188	(Germany) SC DHfK Leipzig Handball	13
189	(Croatia) RK Spačva Vinkovci	13
190	(Spain) Rebi Balonmano Cuenca	13
191	(Turkey) Depsaş Enerji SK	13
192	(Cyprus) PAC Omonia 29M	13
193	(Poland) KS Azoty-Puławy	12

== Former club members ==
=== Notable former players ===
- (Spain) David Balaguer (2014-2015)
- (Spain) Rubén Marchán (2012-2015)
- (Spain) Ángel Montoro (2018–2019)
- (Spain) David Rodríguez Carvajal (2008–2010)
- (Spain) (Hungary) Pedro Rodríguez Álvarez (2008–2011)
- (Argentina) Santiago Baronetto (2018–2020)
- (Argentina) (Italy) Martín Ariel Doldan (2016–2022)
- (Argentina) Federico Gastón Fernández (2011–2013)
- (Argentina) Juan Pablo Fernández (2012–2013)
- (Argentina) Leonel Maciel (2017–2021)
- (Argentina) Lucas Moscariello (2018–2021)
- (Argentina) Federico Pizarro (2020–)
- (Argentina) Ignacio Pizarro (2022–)
- (Argentina) Pablo Simonet (2011–2013, 2020–)
- (Argentina) Pablo Vainstein (2015-2021)
- (Argentina) Agustín Vidal (2012–2013, 2014–2015, 2016–2017)
- (Brazil) Leonardo Dutra (2017–2020)
- (Brazil) Thiago Ponciano (2015–2022)
- (Brazil) Alexandro Pozzer (2021–)
- (Brazil) Henrique Teixeira (2022–)
- (Brazil) Leonardo Terçariol (2015-2017)
- (Croatia) Krešimir Ivanković (2010–2011)
- (Cuba) (Qatar) Rafael Capote (2009–2011)
- (Cuba) Guillermo Corzo (2011–2013)
- (Cuba) Jorge Pabán (2009–2012)
- (Hungary) Bálint Fekete (2019–2020)
- (Italy) Davide Bulzamini (2020–2022)
- (Montenegro) Vladan Lipovina (2013–2014)
- (Montenegro) (Serbia) Vuk Milošević (2013–2014)
- (Poland) Dawid Nilsson (2008–2010)
- (Russia) (Ukraine) Serhiy Bebeshko (1992–1993)
- (Serbia) Dobrivoje Marković (2008–2011)
- (Serbia) Vladimir Petrić (2008–2009)
- (Sweden) Richard Kappelin (2010–2012)

=== Former coaches ===
Seasons	Coach	Country
2007–2010	Goran Džokić	(Serbia)
2010–2014	Francisco Javier Equisoain	(Spain)
2014–	Lidio Jiménez Carrascosa	(Spain)
