= SD Teucro =

Spanish handball club

Teucro
- Full name: Sociedad Deportiva Teucro
- Founded: May 4, 1945; 80 years ago
- Arena: Pavillón Municipal, Pontevedra, Galicia, Spain
- Capacity: 3,500
- President: (Spain) Carlos García-Alén
- Head coach: (Spain) Quique Domínguez
- League: Liga ASOBAL
- 2014–15: División de Plata, 1st – promoted
Home	Away

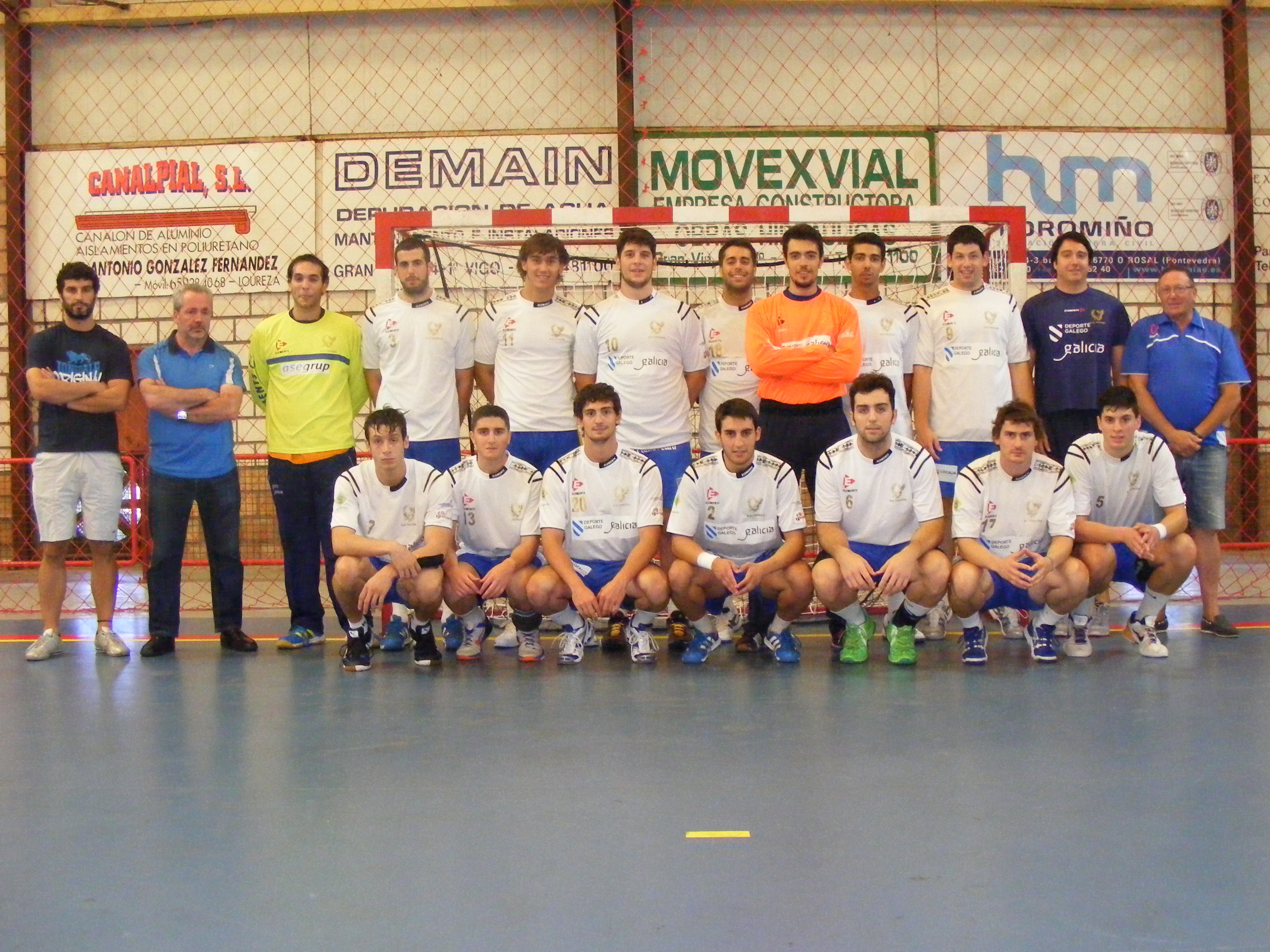
Teucro in Copa Galicia 2013

Sociedad Deportiva Teucro is a handball team based in Pontevedra, Galicia, in Spain. SD Teucro currently plays (2015–16 season) in Liga ASOBAL.

For sponsorship reasons the club has previously been known as Teucro CajaPontevedra, Condes de Albarei Teucro and Lirón Teucro.

== History ==
The club was founded on May 4, 1945. Besides handball they offered a wide variety of sports, including gymnastics, soccer, basketball, hockey and table tennis.

In the beginning the team focused on field handball.

In 1963/64 the team was promoted to the División de Honor for the first time.

== Season by season ==
Season	Tier	Division	Pos.	Notes
1990–91	1	ASOBAL	6th / 1st	
1991–92	1	ASOBAL	3rd / 6th	
1992–93	1	ASOBAL	7th / 1st	
1993–94	1	ASOBAL	5th / 1st	
1994–95	1	ASOBAL	4th	
1995–96	1	ASOBAL	7th	
1996–97	1	ASOBAL	14th	Relegated
1997–98	2	Honor B	2nd	Promoted
1998–99	1	ASOBAL	7th	
1999–00	1	ASOBAL	13th	Relegated
2000–01	2	Honor B	2nd	Promoted
2001–02	1	ASOBAL	11th	
2002–03	1	ASOBAL	11th	
2003–04	1	ASOBAL	8th	

Season	Tier	Division	Pos.	Notes
2004–05	1	ASOBAL	15th	Relegated
2005–06	2	Honor B	8th	
2006–07	2	Honor B	2nd	Promoted
2007–08	1	ASOBAL	10th	
2008–09	1	ASOBAL	15th	Relegated
2009–10	2	Plata	6th	
2010–11	2	Plata	3rd	
2011–12	2	Plata	11th	
2012–13	2	Plata	6th	
2013–14	2	Plata	12th	
2014–15	2	Plata	1st	Promoted
2015–16	1	ASOBAL	15th	Relegated
2016–17	2	Plata	1st	Promoted

- 15 seasons in Liga ASOBAL

== Current squad ==
- 05 (Spain) Arkaitz Piriz
- 06 (Spain) Erick Azcue
- 07 (Spain) David Garcia
- 08 (Spain) David Chapela
- 11 (Spain) Victor Costas
- 13 (Spain) Ivan Fernandez
- 14 (Spain) Gonzalo Castro
- 16 (Spain) Andres Delgado
- 17 (Spain) Carlos Garcia
- 19 (Spain) Roman Jordedo
- 27 (Spain) Jose Rial
- 33 (Spain) Daniel Menendez
- 46 (Spain) Eduardo Moledo
- 66 (Spain) Ricardo Fernandez
- 87 (Spain) Samuel Avila

== Notable players ==
- (Spain) David Davis
- (Spain) José Javier Hombrados
- (Spain) Xavier Pascual Fuertes
- (Montenegro) Draško Mrvaljević
- (North Macedonia) Borko Ristovski
- (Serbia) Dejan Perić
- (Sweden) Dalibor Doder

== Stadium information ==
- Name: - Pavillón Municipal
- City: - Pontevedra
- Capacity: - 3,500
- Address: - Rúa J.M. Pintos s/n
