= Liga ASOBAL 2002–03 =

Liga ASOBAL 2002–03 season was the 13th since its establishment. A total of 16 teams competed this season for the championship.

== Competition format ==
This season, the competition was played in a round-robin format, through 30 rounds. The team with most points earned wins the championship. The last two teams were relegated.

== Overall standing ==
Final standing is

	Team	P	W	D	L	G+	G−	Dif	Pts
1	Barcelona	30	26	2	2	960	745	215	54
2	Ciudad Real	30	25	0	5	896	694	202	50
3	Caja España Ademar León	30	23	3	4	895	750	145	49
4	Portland San Antonio	30	22	3	5	868	762	106	47
5	Valladolid	30	16	5	9	888	815	73	37
6	Altea	30	14	4	12	775	761	14	32
7	Cantabria	30	13	4	13	759	751	8	30
8	Valencia	30	15	0	15	792	841	–49	30
9	KH-7 Granollers	30	11	6	13	821	816	5	28
10	Gáldar	30	10	5	15	769	784	–15	25
11	Teucro ENCE	30	7	7	16	766	875	–109	21
12	Frigorificos Morrazo	30	6	8	16	710	841	–131	20
13	Bidasoa	30	5	9	16	721	771	–50	19
14	Barakaldo UPV	30	5	6	19	751	888	–137	16
15	Alcobendas	30	7	2	21	674	770	–96	16
16	Torrevieja	30	3	0	27	733	914	–181	6

EHF Champions League
EHF Cup Winners' Cup
EHF Cup
relegated

2002–03 Liga ASOBAL winners
(Catalonia)
Barcelona
Eighth title

== Squads ==
See. "Un póker de ases consolidado" (PDF) (in Spanish). Mundo Deportivo. 14 September 2002.

== Top goal scorers ==
Bilal Šuman from Barakaldo UPV is top scorer with 196 goals.
