= Liga ASOBAL 1994–95 =

Liga ASOBAL 1994–95 season was the fifth since its establishment. This season start a new competition format. The league was played in two–phases. In the first phase, 16 teams played in a round-robin format. The team with most points earned was the champion. In a second phase, teams from 12th to 15th position had to play the permanence–relegation promotion.

== First phase ==
=== Overall standing ===
Pos	Team	Pld	W	D	L	GF	GA	GD	Pts	Qualification or relegation
1	Elgorriaga Bidasoa	30	25	2	3	867	714	+153	52	EHF Champions League
2	Barcelona	30	25	2	3	899	726	+173	52	EHF Champions League
3	Teka	30	22	2	6	889	805	+84	46	EHF Cup Winners' Cup
4	CajaPontevedra	30	19	3	8	873	811	+62	41	EHF Cup
5	Cadagua Gáldar	30	19	2	9	995	931	+64	40	EHF City Cup
6	Granollers	30	17	5	8	828	776	+52	39	EHF Cup
7	Academia Octavio	30	15	1	14	1010	1011	−1	31	EHF Cup Winners' Cup
8	Valladolid	30	10	4	16	804	840	−36	24	
9	Ciudad Real	30	11	2	17	821	882	−61	24	
10	Alzira	30	11	1	18	893	970	−77	23	
11	Avirresa Guadalajara	30	8	6	16	775	832	−57	22	
12	Prosesa Ademar León	30	7	6	17	751	787	−36	20	permanence playoff
13	Juventud Alcalá	30	8	4	18	820	849	−29	20	permanence playoff
14	Conquense	30	6	5	19	776	861	−85	17	relegation playoff
15	Puleva Maristas	30	6	5	19	839	920	−81	17	relegation playoff
16	Huétor Tájar	30	3	6	21	749	874	−125	12	Relegated

1994–95 Liga ASOBAL winners
(Basque Country (autonomous community))
Elgorriaga Bidasoa
First title

== Second phase ==
=== permanence promotion ===
permanence playoff
12	Prosesa Ademar León	22	32	23	32
13	Juventud Alcalá	19	34	31	34

- Juventud Alcalá remained in Liga ASOBAL. Prosesa Ademar León played In–Out promotion.

=== relegation promotion ===
relegation playoff
14	Conquense	32	23	30
15	Puleva Maristas	30	21	25

- Conquense played In–Out playoff. Puleva Maristas relegated.

=== In–Out playoff ===
relegation playoff
Cangas Frigorificos Morrazo	26	17	43
Prosesa Ademar León	22	20	42

- Cangas Frigorificos del Morrazo promoted to Liga ASOBAL. Prosesa Ademar León relegated.
- Due to CB Alzira liquidation, Prosesa Ademar León retained its seat in Liga ASOBAL.

In–Out playoff
Ciudad Naranco	24	27	51
Conquense	23	34	57

- Conquense remained in Liga ASOBAL.

== Top goal scorers ==
Player	Goals	Team
(Croatia) Zoran Mikulić	213	Academia Octavio
