= BM Valladolid =

Spanish handball club

Cuatro Rayas Valladolid
- Full name: Club Balonmano Valladolid
- Nickname(s)
- Founded: 1991
- Dissolved: 2014
- Arena: Huerta del Rey, Valladolid, Castile and León, Spain
- Capacity: 3,500
- President: (Spain) Óscar Simón
- Head coach: (Spain) Nacho González
- League: División de Plata
- 2013–14: Liga ASOBAL, 15th – relegated

Club Balonmano Valladolid was a Spanish handball team based in Valladolid, Castilla and León.

== History ==
Club Balonmano Valladolid was founded in the 1991 summer when acquired the ACD Michelin' seat. Michelin was founded in 1975 by the own company's employees. In the 1991 summer, Michelin suffered serious economic troubles that ended with the club's history. Later, BM Valladolid bought the Michelin's seat.

After its relegation from the 2013–14 Liga ASOBAL, BM Valladolid announced it would be dissolved. Later, the club was re-founded as Atlético Valladolid and played in División de Plata.

=== Season by season ===
Season	Tier	Division	Pos.	Notes
1991–92	1	ASOBAL	5th / 2nd	
1992–93	1	ASOBAL	4th / 8th	
1993–94	1	ASOBAL	6th / 4th	
1994–95	1	ASOBAL	8th	
1995–96	1	ASOBAL	8th	
1996–97	1	ASOBAL	4th	
1997–98	1	ASOBAL	5th	
1998–99	1	ASOBAL	6th	
1999–00	1	ASOBAL	10th	
2000–01	1	ASOBAL	6th	
2001–02	1	ASOBAL	7th	
2002–03	1	ASOBAL	5th	

Season	Tier	Division	Pos.	Notes
2003–04	1	ASOBAL	5th	
2004–05	1	ASOBAL	5th	
2005–06	1	ASOBAL	4th	
2006–07	1	ASOBAL	5th	
2007–08	1	ASOBAL	5th	
2008–09	1	ASOBAL	3rd	
2009–10	1	ASOBAL	3rd	
2010–11	1	ASOBAL	5th	
2011–12	1	ASOBAL	4th	
2012–13	1	ASOBAL	12th	
2013–14	1	ASOBAL	15th	Relegated

- 23 seasons in Liga ASOBAL

== Trophies ==
- King's Cup: 2
  - Winners: 2004–05, 2005–06
  - Runners-Up: 1999–00, 2010–11
- ASOBAL Cup: 1
  - Winners: 2002–03
- Supercopa ASOBAL
  - Runners-Up: 2000–01
- EHF Cup
  - Runners-Up: 1998–99
- EHF Challenge Cup
  - Runners-Up: 1999–00
- EHF Cup Winners' Cup
  - Winners: 2008–09
  - Runners-Up: 2003–04, 2005–06

== Current squad 2013/14 ==
Goalkeepers
- 01 (Spain) Yeray Lamariano
- 16 (Spain) César Pérez

Line players
- 03 (Spain) Gonzalo Porras
- 05 (Spain) Iñaki Peciña

Wingers
- 06 (Spain) Miguel Lacasa
- 09 (Spain) Ismael Juárez
- 10 (Spain) Fernando Hernández
- 19 (Spain) Víctor Mejías

Back players
- 07 (Spain) Daniel Simón
- 08 (Spain) David Fernández
- 11 (Spain) Pablo Cacheda
- 13 (Spain) Paco López
- 17 (Cuba) Guillermo Corzo
- 18 (Spain) Alberto Camino
- 20 (Spain) José Ávila
- 21 (Spain) Roberto Pérez
- 24 (Montenegro) Miloš Božović
- 34 (Spain) César Merino
- (Serbia) Miloš Pešić

Technical staff
- Head coach: (Spain) Nacho González
- Assistant coach:

== Stadium Information ==
- Name: - Polideportivo Huerta del Rey
- City: - Valladolid
- Capacity: - 3,600
- Address: - Joaquin Velasco Martin, s/n.

== Notable former players ==
- Roberto García Parrondo
- Raúl González
- Julio Fis
- Iñaki Malumbres Aldave
- Václav Lanča
- László Hoffmann
- József Bordás
- Nenad Bilbija
- Ivan Nikčević
- Guillaume Joli
- Håvard Tvedten
- Chema Rodríguez
- Žikica Milosavljević
- Alen Muratović
- Eric Gull
- Óscar Perales
- Juan Bosco Rentero
- Víctor Hugo López
- Víctor Alonso
- Gregor Lorger
- Marko Krivokapić
- Tin Tokić
- Alexis Rodríguez
- Juan Bosco Rentero
- Luka Ščurek
- Patrick Eilert
- Davor Čutura
- Jorge García Vega
- Category:BM Valladolid handball players
