= SDC San Antonio =

Spanish handball club

San Antonio
- Full name: Sociedad Deportiva Cultural San Antonio
- Founded: 1955
- Dissolved: 2013
- Arena: Pabellón de Zizur Mayor, Zizur Mayor, Navarre, Spain
- Capacity: 3,000
- League: Liga ASOBAL
- 2011–12: 10th
Home	Away

Sociedad Deportiva Cultural San Antonio was a Spanish handball team based in Pamplona, Navarra. During the 1990's and early 2000's it was one of the strongest teams in Spain.

== History ==
Founded in 1955, they were promoted to the Liga ASOBAL in May 1989. In 1992-93 they were relegated, but promoted again 2 years later. Afterwards they established themselves as a strong first league team. In 1999 they won their first title; the Spanish Cup. They won their first Spanish Championship in 2001–02. They also won the 2000-01 EHF Champions League, beating FC Barcelona in the final.

In the early 2000's they continued to be one of the top Spanish teams, winning another league title in 2004-05. In the 2008-09 season the team started to fall behind, when they were left by their sponsor 'Portland'.

In July 2012, the team resigned from the Liga ASOBAL for the 2012–13 season due to the failure to find a new sponsor, being demoted two divisions (to Primera Estatal). After an uncertain few weeks, its spot in Primera Estatal was transferred to BM Ardoi, therefore, the club no longer owned any sporting team.

In April 2013, when the bankruptcy process finished, SDC San Antonio was officially liquidated.

=== Sponsors ===
- 1968–1969: Kaiku
- 1971–1972: Werner
- 1972–1977: Schweppes
- 1977–1978: No sponsor
- 1978–1979: Reynolds
- 1979–1980: Ronkari
- 1980–1981: Chistu
- 1981–1982: Berberana
- 1982–1983: Vinos de Navarra
- 1983–1984: Garsa
- 1984–1987: Larios
- 1987–1989: Espárragos de Navarra
- 1989–1993: Mepamsa
- 1993–1994: Proedina
- 1994–1995: Ariston
- 1995–1997: Lagun Aro
- 1997–2009: Cementos Portland
- 2009–2010: Reyno de Navarra
- 2010–2012: AMAYA Sport
- 2012–2013: No sponsor

== Season by season ==
Season	Tier	Division	Pos.	Notes
1990–91	1	ASOBAL	5th / 8th	
1991–92	1	ASOBAL	4th / 8th	
1992–93	1	ASOBAL	6th / 2nd	Relegated
1993–94	2	1ª Nacional	12th (Group II)	
1994–95	2	Honor B	2nd	Promoted
1995–96	1	ASOBAL	11th	
1996–97	1	ASOBAL	9th	
1997–98	1	ASOBAL	2nd	
1998–99	1	ASOBAL	2nd	
1999–00	1	ASOBAL	3rd	
2000–01	1	ASOBAL	3rd	

Season	Tier	Division	Pos.	Notes
2001–02	1	ASOBAL	1st	Champion
2002–03	1	ASOBAL	4th	
2003–04	1	ASOBAL	3rd	
2004–05	1	ASOBAL	1st	Champion
2005–06	1	ASOBAL	3rd	
2006–07	1	ASOBAL	2nd	
2007–08	1	ASOBAL	4th	
2008–09	1	ASOBAL	4th	
2009–10	1	ASOBAL	6th	
2010–11	1	ASOBAL	7th	
2011–12	1	ASOBAL	10th	Disbanded

- 20 seasons in Liga ASOBAL

== Trophies ==
- Liga ASOBAL
  - Winners: 2001–02, 2004–05
  - Runners-Up: 1997–98, 1999-00
- Copa del Rey
  - Winners: 1998–99, 2000–01
  - Runners-Up: 1997-98
- Supercopa ASOBAL
  - Winners: 2001–02, 2002–03, 2004–05
  - Runners-Up: 1999-00
- Cup-Winners Cup
  - Winners: 1999–00, 2003–04
- European Cup
  - Winners: 2000-01
  - Runners-Up: 2002–03, 2005–06
- European Supercup
  - Winners: 2000-01
  - Runners-Up: 2001-02

== Last squad ==
Note: Flags indicate national team as defined under FIFA eligibility rules; some limited exceptions apply. Players may hold more than one non-FIFA nationality.

No.	Pos.	Nation	Player
1		SRB	Radivoje Ristanović
2		MNE	Vasko Ševaljević
3		ESP	Gedeón Guardiola
4		ESP	David Jiménez
5		ESP	Niko Mindegía
6		ESP	Ignacio Peciña
8		ESP	Julen López
9		SRB	David Rašić
10		ESP	Ibai Meoki
11		ESP	Víctor Álvarez

No.	Pos.	Nation	Player
12		SWE	Herdeiro Lucau
13		NED	Iso Sluijters
14		SRB	Danimir Ćurković
15		ESP	Adrián Crowley
16		ESP	Álvaro Amezqueta
17		ESP	Iñaki Iriarte
18		ESP	Iñaki Miquele
22		ESP	Luis Jiménez
88		ESP	Alberto Aguirrezabalaga

== Stadium Information ==
- Name: - Pabellón Universitario de Navarra
- City: - Pamplona
- Capacity: - 3,000-3,500
- Address: - Campus Arrosadía, s/n.

== Notable former players ==
- (Belarus) Mikhail Yakimovich
- (Spain) Mateo Garralda
- (Spain) Iñaki Malumbres
- (France) Jackson Richardson
- (Croatia) Ivano Balić
- (Cuba) (Hungary) Vladimir Rivero
- (Croatia) Davor Dominiković
- (Croatia) Valter Matošević
- (Serbia) Nedeljko Jovanović
- (Serbia) Ratko Nikolić
- (Serbia) Ivan Nikčević
- (Montenegro) Vasko Ševaljević
- (Spain) "Juancho Pérez"
- (Spain) José Javier Hombrados
- (Russia) Oleg Kisselev
- (Sweden) Tomas Svensson
- (Serbia and Montenegro) (Qatar) (Bosnia and Herzegovina) Danijel Šarić
- (Spain) Albert Rocas
- (Portugal) Ricardo Andorinho
- (Serbia) Radivoje Ristanović
- (Spain) Cristian Malmagro
- (Denmark) Lars T. Jørgensen
- (Denmark) Kasper Hvidt
- (Denmark) Claus Møller Jakobsen
- (Norway) Kristian Kjelling
- (Spain) Niko Mindegía
- (Spain) Carlos Ruesga
- (Romania) Alexandru Buligan
- (Slovenia) (North Macedonia) Renato Vugrinec
- (Federal Republic of Yugoslavia) Goran Stojanović
- Category:SDC San Antonio players
