= Liga ASOBAL 1999–2000 =

Liga ASOBAL 1999–2000 season was the tenth since its establishment. A total of 14 teams competed this season for the championship.

== Competition format ==
This season, the competition format consisted in two phases.

Phase	Remark
First	All teams competed in the first phase through 26 rounds in a round-robin format.
Second	The second phase was divided in two groups; the first eight teams competed for the championship, and teams on 11th, 12th, 13th and 14th position played for permanence-relegation.

== Overall standing ==
Team	Pld	W	D	L	GF	GA	GD	Pts	Qualification or relegation
Barcelona	26	22	2	2	809	619	+190	46	Championship playoff
Caja España Ademar León	26	19	4	3	763	605	+158	42	Championship playoff
Portland San Antonio	26	18	1	7	742	658	+84	37	Championship playoff
Caja Cantabria	26	15	3	8	664	616	+48	33	Championship playoff
Bidasoa	26	12	7	7	603	597	+6	31	Championship playoff
Gáldar	26	14	2	10	678	686	−8	30	Championship playoff
Ciudad Real	25	12	2	11	682	697	−15	27	Championship playoff
Valencia Airtel	26	10	5	11	698	733	−35	25	Championship playoff
Frigorificos Morrazo	26	10	4	12	631	669	−38	24	
Valladolid	26	10	4	12	746	741	+5	24	
Granollers	26	7	6	13	629	654	−25	20	Permanence-relegation playoff
Garbel Zaragoza	26	6	3	17	631	703	−72	15	Permanence-relegation playoff
Caja Pontevedra	26	3	2	21	609	718	−109	8	Permanence-relegation playoff
Redcom Airtel	26	1	0	25	537	726	−189	2	Permanence-relegation playoff

=== Championship playoff ===
quarter-finals
1	Barcelona	34	23	_
8	Valencia Airtel	21	19	_
4	Caja Cantabria	19	23	_
5	Bidasoa	22	25	_
2	Caja España Ademar León	26	30	_
7	Ciudad Real	24	29	_
3	Portland San Antonio	27	24	_
6	Gáldar	24	23	_

semi-finals
1	Barcelona	28	32	_
4	Bidasoa	22	22	_
2	Caja España Ademar León	23	22	_
3	Portland San Antonio	27	28	_

final
1	Barcelona	26	28	25
3	Portland San Antonio	22	24	23

1999–2000 Liga ASOBAL winners
(Catalonia)
Barcelona
Seventh title

=== permanence playoff ===
semi-finals
12	Garbel Zaragoza	27	21	22
13	Caja Pontevedra	22	27	21
11	Granollers	32	33
14	Redcom Airtel Chapela	16	25

final
1	Granollers	21	23	25
2	Garbel Zaragoza	18	28	22

- Granollers remained in Liga ASOBAL. Garbel Zaragoza played In–Out playoff. Redcom Airtel Chapela & CajaPontevedra relegated.

=== In–Out playoff ===
In-Out playoff
Barakaldo UPV	25	23
Garbel Zaragoza	25	23

- Garbel Zaragoza remained in Liga ASOBAL.

== Top goal scorers ==
Player	Goals	Team
(France) Patrick Cazal	166	Bidasoa
(Cuba) Julio Fis	155	Bidasoa
(Spain) Alberto Entrerríos	150	Caja España Ademar León
(Spain) Julio Muñoz	149	Gáldar
(Spain) Enrique Andreu	146	Valencia Airtel
(Slovenia) Gregor Cvijič	139	Valencia Airtel
(Spain) Iker Romero	136	Valladolid
(Spain) Carlos Viver	135	Caja Pontevedra
(Spain) Rafael Guijosa	134	Barcelona
(Spain) Fernando Hernández	133	Caja España Ademar León
