= Liga ASOBAL 1997–98 =

Liga ASOBAL 1997–98 season was the eighth since its establishment. A total of 14 teams (2 less than 1996–97 season) competed this season.

== Competition format ==
This season, the competition format consisted in two phases.

Phase	Remark
First	All teams competed in the first phase through 26 rounds in a round-robin format.
Second	The second phase was divided in two groups; the first four teams competed for the championship, and the last four teams competed for the permanence.

== Overall standing ==
Pos	Team	Pld	W	D	L	GF	GA	GD	Pts	Qualification or relegation
1	Barcelona	26	24	1	1	817	608	+209	49	Championship playoff
2	Portland San Antonio	26	16	6	4	720	653	+67	38	Championship playoff
3	Prosesa Ademar León	26	16	3	7	740	656	+84	35	Championship playoff
4	Caja Cantabria	26	14	2	10	718	680	+38	30	Championship playoff
5	Valladolid	26	13	1	12	758	750	+8	27	
6	Quesos García Vaquero	26	9	9	8	728	733	−5	27	
7	Redcom Airtel Chapela	26	11	5	10	607	638	−31	27	
8	Bidasoa	26	9	6	11	628	640	−12	24	
9	Cadagua Gáldar	26	8	5	13	701	764	−63	21	
10	Granollers	26	8	4	14	629	661	−32	20	
11	Pilotes Posada	26	9	2	15	693	750	−57	20	Permanence playoff
12	Altea	26	8	3	15	661	718	−57	19	Permanence playoff
13	Frigorificos Morrazo	26	5	5	16	652	705	−53	15	Permanence playoff
14	Universidad Oviedo	26	5	2	19	584	680	−96	12	Permanence playoff

=== Championship playoff ===
semi-finals
1	Barcelona	34	26
4	Caja Cantabria	24	24
2	Portland San Antonio	25	28	25
3	Prosesa Ademar León	29	21	24

final
1	Barcelona	35	32	29
2	Portland San Antonio	27	20	25

1997–98 Liga ASOBAL winners
(Catalonia)
Barcelona
Fifth title

=== permanence playoff ===
Pos	Team	Pld	W	D	L	GF	GA	GD	Pts	Qualification
1	Altea	12	6	3	3	324	307	+17	15	
2	Frigorificos Morrazo	12	6	1	5	314	301	+13	13	In–Out promotion
3	Pilotes Posada	12	5	2	5	305	306	−1	12	Relegated
4	Universidad Oviedo	12	3	2	7	298	327	−29	8	Relegated

=== In–Out playoff ===
In-Out playoff
Frigorificos Morrazo	27	25
PRASA Pozoblanco	25	21

- Frigorificos Morrazo remained in Liga ASOBAL.

== Top goal scorers ==
Player	Matches	Goals	Average	Team
(Spain) Chechu Villaldea	25	178	7.12	Portland San Antonio
