= Liga ASOBAL 2003–04 =

Liga ASOBAL 2003–04 season was the 14th since its establishment. A total of 16 teams competed this season for the championship.

== Competition format ==
This season, the competition was played in a round-robin format through 30 rounds. The team with the most points earned wins the championship. The last two teams were relegated.

== Overall standing ==
	Team	P	W	D	L	G+	G−	Dif	Pts
1	Ciudad Real	30	26	1	3	885	697	188	53
2	Barcelona	30	24	1	5	953	791	162	49
3	Portland San Antonio	30	23	3	4	878	787	91	49
4	Caja España Ademar León	30	23	1	6	921	755	166	47
5	Valladolid	30	21	2	7	912	820	92	44
6	Altea	30	17	2	11	781	778	3	36
7	Granollers	30	14	3	13	798	788	10	31
8	Teucro ENCE	30	13	3	14	794	850	–56	29
9	Cantabria	30	12	2	16	783	809	–26	26
10	Almeria 2005	30	9	1	20	737	809	–72	19
11	Bidasoa	30	7	4	19	750	805	–55	18
12	Frigorificos Morrazo	30	7	4	19	738	831	–93	18
13	Arrate	30	7	3	20	759	857	–98	17
14	Vamasa Valencia	30	7	3	20	838	914	–76	17
15	Barakaldo UPV	30	6	3	21	739	870	–131	15
16	Pilotes Posada	30	5	2	23	710	815	–105	12

EHF Champions League
EHF Cup Winners' Cup
EHF Cup
relegated

2003–04 Liga ASOBAL winners
(Castilla–La Mancha)
Ciudad Real
First title

== Top goal scorers ==
Player	Goals	Team
(Cuba) Julio Fis	240	Valladolid
