= Julián Ruiz =

Spanish handball player (born 1960)

Personal information
- Nationality: Spanish
- Born: 25 February 1960 (age 66)

Sport
- Sport: Handball

Julián Ruiz (born 25 February 1960) is a Spanish handball player. He competed at the 1984 Summer Olympics and the 1988 Summer Olympics.
