= CB Cantabria =

Spanish handball club

Teka Cantabria
- Full name: Club Balonmano Cantabria
- Founded: 1975
- Dissolved: 2008
- Arena: Palacio de los Deportes, Santander, Cantabria, Spain
- Capacity: 6,200
- 2007–08: Liga ASOBAL, 14th
Home	Away

Club Balonmano Cantabria was a team of handball based in Santander, Cantabria. CB Cantabria was not registered in any handball league after 2008.

== History ==
Balonmano Cantabria was founded in 1975 when bought the seat of CB La Salle Authi from Los Corrales de Buelna. La Salle Authi was for a long time sponsored by Authi. From 1972–73 season to 1974–75 season, La Salle Authi played in Primera División (2nd tier). In 1975, the industrial company based in Santander, Teka, bought the team's seat and relocated it to Santander from Los Corrales de Buelna. The team was renamed more later as G.D. Teka.

In the 2007-08 season they survived relegation with a last minute goal by Bo Spellerberg in a match against Ademar León. In August 2008 it was announced that the club has lost their place in the Liga ASOBAL after not delivering on the promises made to the Spanish Handball Federation and Liga ASOBAL.

=== Club names ===
- Teka - (1990–1995)
- Cantabria - (1995–1996)
- Caja Cantabria - (1996–2000)
- Cantabria - (2000–2004)
- Teka Cantabria - (2004–2008)

=== Season by season ===
Season	Tier	Division	Pos.	Notes
1990–91	1	ASOBAL	2nd / 2nd	
1991–92	1	ASOBAL	1st / 5th	
1992–93	1	ASOBAL	1st / 1st	Champions
1993–94	1	ASOBAL	3rd / 2nd	Champions
1994–95	1	ASOBAL	3rd	
1995–96	1	ASOBAL	2nd	
1996–97	1	ASOBAL	3rd	
1997–98	1	ASOBAL	4th	
1998–99	1	ASOBAL	5th	

Season	Tier	Division	Pos.	Notes
1999–00	1	ASOBAL	4th	
2000–01	1	ASOBAL	9th	
2001–02	1	ASOBAL	6th	
2002–03	1	ASOBAL	7th	
2003–04	1	ASOBAL	9th	
2004–05	1	ASOBAL	11th	
2005–06	1	ASOBAL	13th	
2006–07	1	ASOBAL	15th	
2007–08	1	ASOBAL	14th	Dissolved after the season

- 18 seasons in Liga ASOBAL

== Trophies ==
- Liga ASOBAL: 2
  - 1992–93, 1993–94
- King's Cup: 2
  - 1988–89, 1994–95
- ASOBAL Cup: 4
  - 1990–91, 1991–92, 1996–97, 1997–98
- Supercopa ASOBAL: 2
  - 1992–93, 1994–95
- EHF Champions League: 1
  - 1993–94
- EHF Cup: 1
  - 1992–93
- EHF Cup Winner's Cup: 2
  - 1989–90, 1997–98
- IHF Super Globe: 1
  - 1996–97

== Last Squad (2007-08 season) ==
- 1 (Greece) Dimitrios Kaffatos
- 2 (Spain) Joaquín Marcos
- 3 (Spain) David Pico
- 5 (Sweden) Umberto Brajković
- 6 (Hungary) Ákos Doros
- 10 (Spain) Avelino Iglesias
- 11 (Spain) Ángel Fernández
- 12 (Spain) Borja Gómez
- 15 (Spain) Rodrigo Reñones
- 16 (Spain) Jorge Oliva
- 17 (Spain) Javier Gutíerrez
- 18 (Slovakia) Pavol Polakovic
- 19 (Spain) Abel Lamadrid
- 20 (Serbia) Damjan Blečić
- 21 (Montenegro) Goran Cmiljanić
- 23 (Spain) Oscar Río
- 77 (Germany) Tim Bauer

== Statistics 2007/08 ==
Liga ASOBAL	Position	Pts	P	W	D	L	F	A
Teka Cantabria	14	17	30	8	1	21	777	881

- Goals:
  - Rodrigo Reñones - 103 goals
  - Tim Bauer - 94 goals
  - Ouallid Ben Amor - 83 goals
- Catches:
  - Jorge Oliva - 171 catches 27%
  - Dimitros Kaffatos - 124 catches 27%

== Stadium information ==
- Name: - Palacio de los Deportes
- City: - Santander
- Capacity: - 6,200 people
- Address: - C/ Alta Nº133, s/n (very near to Estadio El Sardinero).

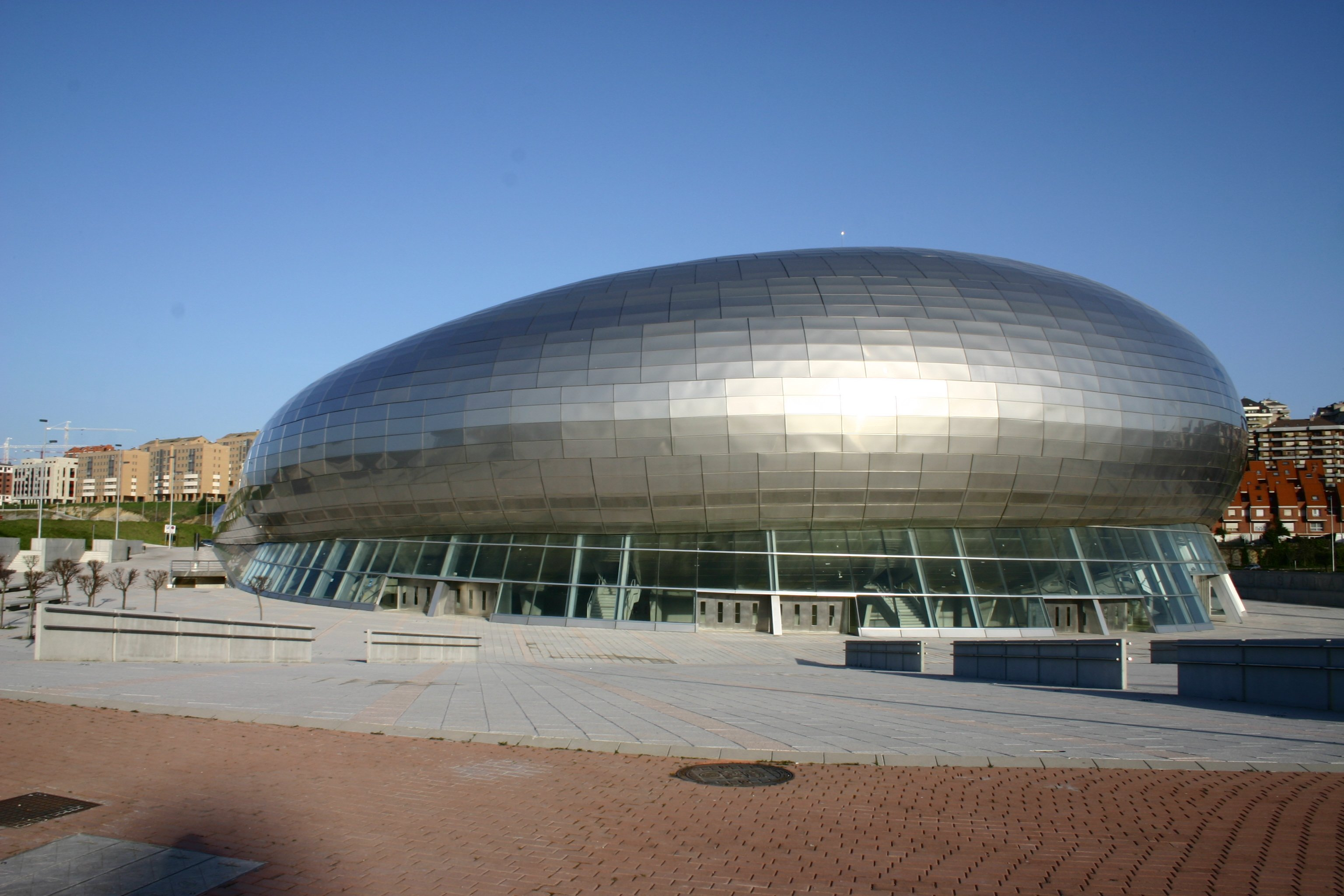
Palacio de los Deportes de Santander

== Notable players ==
Foreign players

- (Socialist Federal Republic of Yugoslavia) Senad Fetahagić
- (Socialist Federal Republic of Yugoslavia) Slobodan Batinović
- (Socialist Federal Republic of Yugoslavia) Miloran Čizmić or Milorad Čizmić
- (Socialist Federal Republic of Yugoslavia) Dragan Mladenović
- (Socialist Federal Republic of Yugoslavia) Đorđe Rašić
- (Socialist Federal Republic of Yugoslavia) Gordan Žigić
- (Romania) Marian Dumitru
- (Denmark) Otto Mertz
- (Sweden) Mats Olsson
- (Iceland) Kristján Arason
- (Socialist Federal Republic of Yugoslavia) Jovica Cvetković
- (Soviet Union) Eduard Medvedev
- (Belarus) Mikhail Yakimovich
- (Soviet Union) Yuri Nesterov
- (Socialist Federal Republic of Yugoslavia) Nedeljko Jovanović
- (Russia) Oleg Kiselyov
- (Denmark) Frank Jørgensen
- (Germany) Andreas Rastner
- (Socialist Federal Republic of Yugoslavia) Aleksandar Blagojević
- (Hungary) László Sótonyi
- (Iceland) Sigfús Sigurðsson
- (Sweden) Joakim Ågren
- (Sweden) Peter Genzel
- (Socialist Federal Republic of Yugoslavia) Aleksandar Adžić
- (Sweden) Jocum Hansson
- (Croatia) Venio Losert
- (Russia) Aleksandr Tuchkin
- (Tunisia) Oualid Ben-Amor
- (Sweden) Robert Arrhenius
- (Netherlands) Malik Beširević
- (Sweden) Niklas Johansson
- (Socialist Federal Republic of Yugoslavia) Duško Milinović
- (Socialist Federal Republic of Yugoslavia) Nedeljko Jovanović
- (Portugal) Inácio Carmo
- (Portugal) Eduardo Filipe
- (Bosnia and Herzegovina) Danijel Šarić
- (Slovenia) Luka Žvižej
- (Sweden) Umberto Brajković
- (Greece) Georgios Chalkidis
- (Serbia and Montenegro) Žikica Milosavljević
- (Switzerland) Thomas Gautschi
- (Slovenia) Goran Kozomara
- (Hungary) Gábor Császár

Spanish players

- (Spain) Juan Carlos Solar
- (Spain) Julián Ruiz
- (Spain) Eduardo Sala
- (Spain) Juan Carlos Ben Modo
- (Spain) Miguel Ángel Zúñiga
- (Spain) Chechu Villaldea
- (Spain) Javier Cabanas
- (Spain) Juan Francisco Melo
- (Spain) Jaume Puig
- (Spain) Aitor Echaburu
- (Spain) Rodrigo Reñones
- (Spain) Javier Reino
- (Spain) Talant Duyshebaev
- (Spain) Mateo Garralda
- (Spain) José Javier Hombrados
- (Spain) Alberto Urdiales
- (Spain) Chechu Fernández
- (Spain) Xabier Mikel Rekondo
- (Spain) Jaume Fort
- (Spain) Samuel Trives
- (Spain) Mariano Ortega
- (Spain) Santiago Urdiales
- (Spain) Salvador Esquer
- (Spain) Juan Bosco Rentero

== Notable coaches ==
- Javier García Cuesta
- Manolo Cadenas
- Julián Ruiz
- Jovica Elezović
- Alberto Urdiales
