= EHF Men's Champions Trophy =

Handball competition

The EHF Champions Trophy (named IHF Supercup between 1979 and 1983, named EHF Supercup between 1996 and 2007) was an official annual club competition of the European Handball Federation, that was contested until 2008.

== History ==
Regarded as one of the strongest handball competitions in Europe it was usually played among club winners of the top three EHF competitions (EHF Champions League, EHF Cup, EHF Cup Winners' Cup) during the previous season and the fourth club, either a host or a special EHF invitee.

== Winners ==
Year	Final			Third place match		
Year	Champion	Score	Runner-up	Third place	Score	Fourth place
1979; Details	(Germany); VfL Gummersbach	14–9	(Germany); TV Grosswallstadt			
1980; Details	(Germany); TV Grosswallstadt	19–15	(Spain); CB Alicante			
1981; Details	(East Germany); SC Magdeburg	24–19	(Germany); TuS Nettelstedt			
1982; Details	(East Germany); SC Empor Rostock	31–27	(Hungary); SC Honved Budapest			
1983; Details	(Germany); VfL Gummersbach	17–16	(Soviet Union); SKA Minsk			
1996; Details	(Spain); FC Barcelona Handbol	27–24	(Spain); BM Granollers	(Germany); TBV Lemgo	25–20	(Norway); Drammen HK
1997; Details	(Spain); FC Barcelona Handbol	25–20	(Spain); Elgorriaga Bidasoa	(Denmark); Kolding IF	36–34	(Denmark); Virum-Sorgenfri HK
1998; Details	(Spain); FC Barcelona Handbol	28–22	(Croatia); Badel 1862 Zagreb	(Spain); Caja Cantabria Santander	26–24	(Sweden); IFK Skövde HK
1999; Details	(Spain); FC Barcelona Handbol	26–25	(Germany); SC Magdeburg	(Spain); Prosesa Ademar Leon	35–34	(Germany); SG Flensburg-Handewitt
2000; Details	(Spain); Portland San Antonio	28–24	(Spain); FC Barcelona Handbol	(Hungary); Dunaferr SE	27–22	(Croatia); RK Metković Jambo
2001; Details	(Germany); SC Magdeburg	21–20	(Spain); Portland San Antonio	(Germany); THW Kiel	33–31	(Germany); SG Flensburg-Handewitt
2002; Details	(Germany); SC Magdeburg	31–30	(Hungary); Fotex KC Veszprém	(Spain); BM Ciudad Real	32–20	(Germany); THW Kiel
2003; Details	(Spain); FC Barcelona Handbol	30–29	(Spain); BM Valladolid	(Spain); BM Ciudad Real	29–28	(France); Montpellier HB
2004; Details	(Slovenia); Celje	30–29	(Germany); THW Kiel	(Spain); Ciudad Real	34–24	(Spain); BM Valladolid
2005; Details	(Spain); BM Ciudad Real	37–28	(Germany); SC Magdeburg	(Spain); FC Barcelona Handbol	31–30	(Spain); CB Ademar León
2006; Details	(Spain); BM Ciudad Real	36–31	(Germany); VfL Gummersbach	(Germany); TBV Lemgo	34–33	(Russia); Chekhovskiye Medvedi
2007; Details	(Germany); THW Kiel	38–34	(Slovenia); Celje	(Germany); HSV Hamburg	31–27	(Germany); SC Magdeburg
2008; Details	(Spain); BM Ciudad Real	32–28	(Hungary); MKB Veszprém KC	(Germany); THW Kiel	36–31	(Germany); HSG Nordhorn

== Statistics ==
=== By country ===
Country	1st	2nd	3rd	4th	Top 4
Spain	9	6	6	2	23
Germany	8	6	5	5	24
Slovenia	1	1	0	0	2
Hungary	0	3	1	0	4
Russia / Soviet Union	0	1	0	1	2
Croatia	0	1	0	1	2
Denmark	0	0	1	1	2
Norway	0	0	0	1	1
Sweden	0	0	0	1	1
France	0	0	0	1	1
