= Liga ASOBAL 2004–05 =

Handball season

The Liga ASOBAL 2004–05 season was the 15th season since its establishment. A total of 16 teams competed that season for the championship.

== Competition format ==
This season, the competition was played in a round-robin format, through 30 rounds. The team with most points earned wins the championship. The last two teams were relegated.

== Overall standing ==
	Team	P	W	D	L	G+	G−	Dif	Pts
1	Portland San Antonio	30	28	0	2	906	725	181	56
2	BM Ciudad Real	30	27	1	2	987	746	241	55
3	Caja España Ademar	30	24	2	4	980	800	180	50
4	Barcelona-Cifec	30	25	0	5	964	809	155	50
5	Valladolid	30	21	2	7	932	837	95	44
6	Granollers	30	13	4	13	819	833	–14	30
7	Bidasoa Irún	30	12	2	16	782	833	–51	26
8	Frigoríficos Morrazo	30	10	5	15	779	828	–49	25
9	Altea	30	10	2	18	760	832	–70	22
10	Arrate	30	10	2	18	791	851	–60	22
11	Teka Cantabria	30	10	1	19	767	867	–100	21
12	Alcobendas	30	10	0	20	804	865	–61	20
13	Torrevieja	30	8	3	19	823	868	–45	19
14	Almería 2005	30	9	0	21	741	820	–81	18
15	Teucro ENCE	30	8	2	20	814	887	–73	18
16	Vamasa Valencia	30	2	0	28	767	1015	–248	4

EHF Champions League
EHF Cup Winners' Cup
EHF Cup
relegated

2004–05 Liga ASOBAL winners
(Navarre)
Portland San Antonio
Second title

== Conclusions ==
- Portland San Antonio—Champion and Handball Champion's League
- BM Ciudad Real—Handball Champion's League
- Caja España Ademar León—Handball Champion's League
- FC Barcelona Handbol—Handball Champion's League
- BM Valladolid—EHF Cup Winner's Cup
- BM Granollers—EHF Cup
- CD Bidasoa—EHF Cup
- SD Teucro—Relegated to División de Honor B
- BM Valencia—Relegated to División de Honor B
