= Liga ASOBAL 2001–02 =

Liga ASOBAL 2001–02 season was the 12th since its establishment. A total of 16 teams competed this season for the championship.

== Competition format ==
This season, the competition was played in a round-robin format, through 30 rounds. The team with most points earned wins the championship. The last two teams were relegated.

== Overall standing ==
	Team	P	W	D	L	G+	G−	Dif	Pts
1	Portland San Antonio	30	25	3	2	854	738	116	53
2	Barcelona	30	23	2	5	912	725	187	48
3	Caja España Ademar León	30	22	2	6	861	717	144	46
4	Ciudad Real	30	22	2	6	859	744	115	46
5	Altea	30	15	4	11	756	739	17	34
6	Cantabria	30	14	4	12	743	751	–8	32
7	Valladolid	30	14	4	12	842	801	41	32
8	Bidasoa	30	15	1	14	773	770	3	31
9	Gáldar	30	13	4	13	775	793	–18	30
10	KH-7 Granollers	30	12	5	13	829	814	15	29
11	Teucro Caixanova	30	11	3	16	825	857	–32	25
12	Valencia	30	12	1	17	844	877	–33	25
13	Frigorificos Morrazo	30	9	2	19	718	811	–93	20
14	Barakaldo UPV	30	6	1	23	749	860	–111	13
15	Pilotes Posada	30	4	3	23	754	870	–116	11
16	Ciudad de Roquetas	30	2	1	27	675	902	–227	5

EHF Champions League
EHF Cup Winners' Cup
EHF Cup
relegated

2001–02 Liga ASOBAL winners
(Navarre)
Portland San Antonio
First title

== Top goal scorers ==
Player	Goals	Team
(Spain) Rafa Dasilva	201	Teucro Caixanova
(France) Patrick Cazal	173	Bidasoa
