= 2000–01 EHF Champions League =

European handball tournament

EHF Champions League
- 2000–01

Tournament information
- Sport: Handball
- Dates: 2 September 2000–28 April 2001
- Administrator: EHF
- Participants: 32

Final positions
- Champions: SDC San Antonio

The 2000–01 EHF Champions League was the 41st edition of Europe's premier club handball tournament. FC Barcelona was the reigning champion. SDC San Antonio won the title beating FC Barcelona in the final.

== Round 1 ==
Team #1	Agg.	Team #2	1st match	2nd match
ASKİ SK (Turkey)	58 – 41	(Lithuania) Granitas Kaunas	29 – 18	29 – 23
HC Berchem (Luxembourg)	44 – 68	(Israel) Hapoël Rishon LeZion	25 – 31	19 – 37
Wybrzeże Gdańsk (Poland)	53 – 46	(Slovakia) SKP Secovce	30 – 22	23 – 24
SKA Minsk (Belarus)	52 – 42	(Netherlands) HV Fiqas Aalsmeer	28 – 20	24 – 22
Haukar Hafnarfjörður (Iceland)	53 – 48	(Belgium) HC Eynatten	22 – 18	31 – 30
SPE Strovolos Nicosia (Cyprus)	50 – 51	(Austria) Remus Bärnbach-Köflach	26 – 27	24 – 24
Steaua Bucarest (Romania)	57 – 52	(Greece) Panellínios Athènes	30 – 26	27 – 26
Izviđač Ljubuški (Bosnia and Herzegovina)	41 – 54	(Ukraine) ZTR Zaporizhia	23 – 24	18 – 30

== Round 2 ==
Team #1	Agg.	Team #2	1st match	2nd match
CSKA Moscou (Russia)	39 – 54	(Poland) Wybrzeże Gdańsk	23 – 28	16 – 26
SKA Minsk (Belarus)	48 – 53	(Italy) Pallamano Trieste	28 – 26	20 – 27
Montpellier HB (France)	45 – 41	(Ukraine) ZTR Zaporizhia	24 – 18	21 – 23
RK Lovćen Cetinje (Serbia and Montenegro)	60 – 39	(Austria) Remus Bärnbach-Köflach	30 – 16	30 – 23
Hapoël Rishon LeZion (Israel)	42 – 50	(Sweden) Redbergslids IK	23 – 26	19 – 24
ABC Braga (Portugal)	55 – 50	(Iceland) Haukar Hafnarfjörður	25 – 22	30 – 28
Steaua Bucarest (Romania)	47 – 63	(Czech Republic) HC Baník Karviná	29 – 34	18 – 29
ASKİ SK (Turkey)	56 – 60	(Switzerland) TV Suhr	32 – 21	24 – 29

== Group stage ==
=== Group A ===
Team	Pld	W	D	L	GF	GA	GD	Pts
(Slovenia) Celje	6	5	1	0	183	145	+38	11
(Croatia) Badel 1862 Zagreb	6	4	1	1	155	137	+18	9
(Turkey) ASKI Ankara	6	1	0	5	153	167	−14	2
(Sweden) Redbergslids IK	6	1	0	5	131	173	−42	2

=== Group B ===
Team	Pld	W	D	L	GF	GA	GD	Pts
(Spain) FC Barcelona	6	4	2	0	155	133	+22	10
(France) Montpellier HB	6	3	1	2	146	141	+5	7
(Hungary) Dunaferr SE	6	3	1	2	143	145	−2	7
(Poland) Wybrzeże Gdańsk	6	0	0	6	124	149	−25	0

=== Group C ===
Team	Pld	W	D	L	GF	GA	GD	Pts
(Portugal) ABC Braga	6	4	0	2	151	153	−2	8
(Germany) THW Kiel	6	3	1	2	164	147	+17	7
(Denmark) GOG Gudme	6	3	0	3	165	158	+7	6
(Italy) Pallamano Trieste	6	1	1	4	159	181	−22	3

=== Group D ===
Team	Pld	W	D	L	GF	GA	GD	Pts
(Federal Republic of Yugoslavia) Lovćen Cetinje	6	4	1	1	160	150	+10	9
(Spain) SDC San Antonio	6	4	0	2	170	155	+15	8
(Norway) IL Runar Sandefjord	6	2	0	4	151	165	−14	4
(Czech Republic) Banik Karvina	6	1	1	4	170	181	−11	3

== Knockout stage ==
=== Quarterfinals ===
Team #1	Agg.	Team #2	1st match	2nd match
Montpellier HB (France)	47 – 52	(Slovenia) Celje	24 – 23	23 – 29
Badel 1862 Zagreb (Croatia)	40 – 55	(Spain) FC Barcelona	17 – 29	23 – 26
SDC San Antonio (Spain)	49 – 37	(Portugal) ABC Braga	25 – 16	24 – 21
THW Kiel (Germany)	59 – 51	(Federal Republic of Yugoslavia) Lovćen Cetinje	35 – 22	24 – 29

=== Semifinals ===
Team #1	Agg.	Team #2	1st match	2nd match
THW Kiel (Germany)	56 – 57	(Spain) FC Barcelona	28 – 24	28 – 33
SDC San Antonio (Spain)	62 – 57	(Slovenia) Celje	30 – 28	32 – 29

=== Finals ===
Team #1	Agg.	Team #2	1st match	2nd match
FC Barcelona (Spain)	49 – 52	(Spain) SDC San Antonio	24 - 30	25 - 22
