= Liga ASOBAL =

Spanish handball league

- Current season, competition or edition: 2025–26 Liga ASOBAL
- Sport: Handball
- Founded: 1990; 36 years ago
- No. of teams: 16
- Country: Spain
- Confederation: EHF
- Most recent champion: FC Barcelona (33rd title) (2025–26)
- Most titles: FC Barcelona (33 titles)
- Broadcasters: GOL PLAY; LaLiga+
- Relegation to: División de Plata
- Domestic cups: Copa del Rey; Copa ASOBAL; Iberian Supercup
- International cups: EHF Champions League; EHF European League
- Website: asobal.es

Liga Asobal is the premier professional handball league in Spain. It was founded in 1958 with the name of División de Honor, changing its name to the current name in 1990. The Liga ASOBAL, which is played under EHF rules, currently consists of 16 teams, including famous ones like FC Barcelona, Ademar León, Bidasoa and Granollers.

Famous handball players who have played in the league include Jackson Richardson, Talant Dujshebaev, Staffan Olsson, Mikhail Yakimovich, Ólafur Stefánsson, Oleg Kisselev, Alberto Urdiales, Mateo Garralda, Enric Masip, Iñaki Urdangarin, David Barrufet, Kristian Kjelling, Mikkel Hansen, Petar Metličić, Ivano Balić, Juanín García, Mats Olsson, David Davis, László Nagy, Raúl Entrerríos, Alberto Entrerríos, and many others.

== History ==
- The "División de Honor" Handball championship was created in 1958 and was managed by the Spanish Handball Federation (FEBM) until 1990. ASOBAL (Handball Clubs Association) was formed in 1984. In 1990, ASOBAL took control of the División de Honor and renamed it Liga ASOBAL.
- FC Barcelona have won every championship since 2011, in part due to the disbandment of previous top clubs Ciudad Real and Portland San Antonio.
- The 13-time champions Granollers have not won the title since the 1973–74 season.

== Championship rules ==
Each team of every division has to play with all the other teams of its division twice, once at home and the other at the opponent's stadium. This means that in Liga ASOBAL the league ends after every team plays 30 matches.

Like many other leagues in continental Europe, the Liga ASOBAL takes a winter break once each team has played half its schedule. One unusual feature of the league is that the two halves of the season are played in the same order—that is, the order of each team's first-half fixtures is repeated in the second half of the season, with the only difference being the stadiums used.

Each victory adds 2 points to the team in the league ranking. Each drawn adds 1 point.head-to-head. At the end of the league, the winner is:

1. The team that has most points in the ranking.
2. If two or more teams are level on points, the winner is the team that has the best results
3. If there is no winner after applying the second rule, then the team with the best overall goal difference wins.

== 2024-25 season teams ==
2024–25 Liga Asobal teams

Team	City	Venue	Capacity
FC Barcelona	Barcelona	Palau Blaugrana	7,234
Bidasoa Irún	Irún	Polideportivo Artaleku	2,500
BM Logroño La Rioja	Logroño	Palacio de los Deportes de La Rioja	3,809
Fraikin BM Granollers	Granollers	Palau d'Esports de Granollers	6,000
Bada Huesca	Huesca	Palacio Municipal de Huesca	4,900
Incarlopsa Cuenca	Cuenca	Pabellón Municipal El Sargal	1,800
ABANCA Ademar León	León	Pabellón Municipal de los Deportes	6,000
Ángel Ximénez Puerto Genil	Puente Genil	Pabellón Municipal Alcalde Miguel Salas	900
Recoletas Atlético Valladolid	Valladolid	Polideportivo Huerta del Rey	3,550
Helvetia Anaitasuna	Pamplona	Pabellón Anaitasuna	3,000
BM Benidorm	Benidorm	Palau d'Esports L'Illa de Benidorm	3,000
AD Ciudad de Guadalajara	Guadalajara	Palacio Multiusos de Guadalajara	5,894
Frigoríficos Morrazo	Cangas do Morrazo	Pabellón Municipal de O Gatañal	2,500
BM Nava	Nava de la Asunción	Pabellón Municipal Guerrer@s Naver@s	900
Bathco BM Torrelavega	Torrelavega	Pabellón Municipal Vicente Trueba	2,400
BM Villa de Aranda	Aranda de Duero	Pabellón Santiago Manguán	2,800

== Champions by year ==
=== Primera División champions ===
Year	Team
1952	Atlético Madrid
1953	Real Madrid
1954	Atlético Madrid
1955	Sabadell
1956	Granollers
1957	Granollers
1958	Granollers

=== División de Honor champions ===
Year	Team
1959	Granollers
1960	Granollers
1961	Granollers
1962	Atlético Madrid
1963	Atlético Madrid
1964	Atlético Madrid
1965	Atlético Madrid
1966	Granollers
1967	Granollers
1968	Granollers
1969	FC Barcelona

Year	Team
1970	Granollers
1971	Granollers
1972	Granollers
1973	FC Barcelona
1974	Granollers
1975	Calpisa
1976	Calpisa
1977	Calpisa
1978	Calpisa
1979	Atlético Madrid
1980	FC Barcelona

Year	Team
1981	Atlético Madrid
1982	FC Barcelona
1983	Atlético Madrid
1984	Atlético Madrid
1985	Atlético Madrid
1986	FC Barcelona
1987	Elgorriaga Bidasoa
1988	FC Barcelona
1989	FC Barcelona
1990	FC Barcelona

=== Liga ASOBAL champions ===
Year	Team
1991	FC Barcelona
1992	FC Barcelona
1993	GD Teka
1994	GD Teka
1995	Elgorriaga Bidasoa
1996	FC Barcelona
1997	FC Barcelona
1998	FC Barcelona
1999	FC Barcelona
2000	FC Barcelona
2001	Caja España Ademar
2002	Portland San Antonio

Year	Team
2003	FC Barcelona
2004	Ciudad Real
2005	Portland San Antonio
2006	FC Barcelona
2007	Ciudad Real
2008	Ciudad Real
2009	Ciudad Real
2010	Ciudad Real
2011	FC Barcelona
2012	FC Barcelona
2013	FC Barcelona
2014	FC Barcelona

Year	Team
2015	FC Barcelona
2016	FC Barcelona
2017	FC Barcelona
2018	FC Barcelona
2019	FC Barcelona
2020	FC Barcelona
2021	FC Barcelona
2022	FC Barcelona
2023	FC Barcelona
2024	FC Barcelona
2025	FC Barcelona
2026	FC Barcelona

=== Performance by club ===
Club	Titles	ASOBAL	Seasons
FC Barcelona	33	24	1968–69, 1972–73, 1979–80, 1981–82, 1985–86, 1987–88, 1988–89, 1989–90, 1990–91, 1991–92, 1995–96, 1996–97, 1997–98, 1998–99, 1999–00, 2002–03, 2005–06, 2010–11, 2011–12, 2012–13, 2013–14, 2014–15, 2015–16, 2016–17, 2017–18, 2018–19, 2019–20, 2020–21, 2021–22, 2022–23, 2023–24, 2024–25, 2025-26
BM Granollers	13	5	1955–56, 1956–57, 1957–58, 1958–59, 1959–60, 1960–61, 1965–66, 1966–67, 1967–68, 1969–70, 1970–71, 1971–72, 1973–74
Atlético Madrid	11	13	1951–52, 1953–54, 1961–62, 1962–63, 1963–64, 1964–65, 1978–79, 1980–81, 1982–83, 1983–84, 1984–85
Ciudad Real	5	5	2003–04, 2006–07, 2007–08, 2008–09, 2009–10
Calpisa Alicante	4	0	1974–75, 1975–76, 1976–77, 1977–78
Teka Cantabria	2	2	1992–93, 1993–94
Bidasoa	2	2	1986–87, 1994–95
San Antonio	2	2	2001–02, 2004–05
Ademar León	1	1	2000–01
Real Madrid	1	0	1952–53
Sabadell	1	0	1954–55

=== All-time Liga ASOBAL table ===
Pos	Team	Seasons	Played	Won	Drawn	Lost	G.F.	G.A.	G.D.	Points
1	FC Barcelona	28	834	739	24	71	26549	20208	6341	1502
2	ABANCA Ademar León	24	719	466	76	177	21009	18777	2232	1007
3	Fraikin Granollers	28	825	398	89	338	22188	21681	507	887
4	BM Valladolid	23	672	363	67	242	19077	18242	835	790
5	Ciudad Real	19	560	367	40	153	16084	14363	1721	774
6	Portland San Antonio	20	602	357	59	186	16496	15486	1010	773
7	Teka Cantabria	18	529	280	40	209	13928	13537	391	600
8	Bidasoa Irún	20	591	261	69	261	14788	14898	−110	591
9	Teucro	17	497	177	63	257	12797	13581	−784	417
10	Logroño La Rioja	12	358	191	34	132	10413	9959	454	416
11	Liberbank Cuenca	15	452	162	58	232	11608	12327	−719	382
12	Frigoríficos del Morrazo	18	539	158	61	320	13376	14835	−1459	377
13	Gáldar	12	334	147	49	138	9123	9106	17	343
14	Academia Octavio	13	386	123	43	220	10349	11090	−741	289
15	Altea	9	270	97	30	143	6899	7252	−353	224
16	Arrate	11	331	89	24	208	8317	9132	−815	212
17	Helvetia Anaitasuna	7	208	91	28	89	5640	5757	−117	210
18	BM Aragón	10	300	145	23	131	8753	8734	19	202
19	Huesca	7	208	88	26	94	5587	5783	−196	202
20	Torrevieja	9	270	81	25	163	7123	7711	−588	187
21	Quabit Guadalajara	8	208	77	27	134	6409	6842	−433	181
22	Avidesa Alzira	5	146	77	10	59	3741	3667	74	164
23	Fertiberia Puerto Sagunto	8	238	68	26	144	6318	6956	−638	163
24	Antequera	6	180	59	19	102	4798	5106	−308	135
25	Vamasa Valencia	8	234	58	17	159	6032	6884	−852	133
26	Atlético Madrid BM	4	118	59	10	49	2630	2561	69	128
27	Puleva Maristas	5	141	54	14	73	3614	3668	−54	122
28	Villa de Aranda	5	148	48	27	77	4047	4268	−221	119
29	Ángel Ximénez P.G.	5	148	46	18	84	3878	4150	−272	110
30	BM Atlético Madrid	2	60	52	2	6	1963	1562	401	106
31	Keymare Almería	7	210	47	12	151	5341	6113	−772	106
32	Juventud Alcalá	4	118	45	13	60	2796	2901	−105	103
33	Benidorm	4	118	43	16	59	3049	3220	−171	102
34	Alcobendas	6	180	39	15	126	4587	5180	−593	93
35	Barakaldo	6	186	33	22	131	4622	5444	−822	88
36	Guadalajara	4	119	33	18	68	2685	2973	−288	84
37	Redcom Airtel Chapela	4	110	29	11	70	2442	2806	−364	69
38	Alicante	3	92	28	11	53	2084	2211	−127	67
39	Algeciras	3	90	26	12	52	2475	2753	−278	64
40	Recoletas Atl. Valladolid	2	60	27	2	31	1682	1676	6	56
41	Naranco	3	92	16	5	71	1936	2255	−319	37
42	GoFit Sinfín	2	58	14	4	40	1525	1698	−173	32
43	MMT Seguros Zamora	2	60	13	6	41	1499	1734	−235	32
44	Juanfersa Grupo Fegar	2	60	14	3	43	1448	1649	−201	31
45	Toledo	2	60	12	5	43	1631	1859	−228	29
46	Cajamadrid	1	32	13	3	16	756	766	−10	28
47	Garbel Zaragoza	2	52	9	4	39	1231	1437	−206	22
48	Tres de Mayo	1	29	10	2	17	690	751	−61	22
49	Puerto Cruz	1	29	10	1	18	629	710	81	21
50	Michelin Valladolid	1	29	8	2	19	646	727	−81	21
51	PRASA Pozoblanco	1	30	6	6	18	770	852	−82	18
52	ARS Palma del Río	1	30	5	2	23	744	866	−122	12
53	Huétor Tájar	1	30	3	6	21	749	874	−125	12

- Updated at completion of 2017–18 season.

League or status at 2018–19 season:

Liga ASOBAL
División de Plata
1ª Nacional
2ª Nacional
Club disbanded

== Statistics ==
=== EHF coefficients ===
The following data indicates Spanish coefficient rankings between European handball leagues.

Country ranking

EHF League Ranking for 2021/22 season:

- 1. (1) (Germany) Handball-Bundesliga (133.67)
- 2. (4) (France) LNH Division 1 (132.83)
- 3. (3) (Spain) Liga ASOBAL (95.83)
- 4. (4) (Hungary) Nemzeti Bajnokság I (94.83)
- 5. (5) (North Macedonia) Macedonian Handball Super League (93.00)

Club ranking

EHF Club Ranking as of 25 September 2025:

- 2. Barcelona (652)
- 22. Bidasoa Irun (188)
- 23. Granollers (171)
- 66. Ademar León (71)
- 86. Torrelavega (53)

== See also ==
- Copa del Rey de Balonmano
- Copa ASOBAL
- Iberian Supercup
- División de Plata de Balonmano
