= Liga ASOBAL 2000–01 =

Season of the Spanish Handball League

Liga ASOBAL 2000–01 season was the 11th since its establishment. A total of 14 teams competed this season for the championship.

== Competition format ==
This season, the competition was played in a round-robin format, through 26 rounds. The team with most points earned wins the championship.

== Overall standing ==
	Team	P	W	D	L	G+	G−	Dif	Pts
1	Caja España Ademar León	26	22	2	2	750	613	137	46
2	Barcelona	26	22	1	3	790	620	170	45
3	Portland San Antonio	26	16	2	8	697	670	27	34
4	Gáldar	26	15	3	8	725	673	52	33
5	Ciudad Real	26	15	2	9	645	642	3	32
6	Valladolid	26	13	3	10	747	722	25	29
7	KH-7 Granollers	26	12	4	10	620	602	18	28
8	Bidasoa	26	11	1	14	616	651	–35	23
9	Cantabria	26	9	1	16	643	689	–46	19
10	Altea	26	7	4	15	590	643	–53	18
11	Pilotes Posada	26	8	2	16	619	661	–42	18
12	Valencia Airtel	26	7	3	16	671	720	–49	17
13	Frogorificos Morrazo	26	7	1	18	595	668	–73	15
14	Garbel Zaragoza	26	3	1	22	600	734	–134	7

EHF Champions League
EHF Cup Winners' Cup
EHF Cup
relegated

2000–01 Liga ASOBAL winners
(Castile and León)
Caja España Ademar León
First title

The squad of Caja España Ademar León was:

Shirt No	Nationality	Player	Birth Date	Position
1	Denmark	Kasper Hvidt	6 February 1976 (aged 25)	Goalkeeper
2	Spain	Alberto Entrerríos	7 November 1976 (aged 24)	Left Back
3	Hungary	Csaba Bartók	18 May 1970 (aged 31)	Right Back
5	Spain	Víctor Alvarez Fernández	13 March 1981 (aged 20)	Central Back
6	Spain	Juanín García	28 August 1977 (aged 23)	Left Winger
7	Argentina	Eric Gull	28 August 1973 (aged 27)	Right Back
8	Spain	Manuel Colón	18 February 1977 (aged 24)	Line Player
9	Spain	Iñaki Ordoñez	20 August 1968 (aged 32)	Right Back
10	Spain	Antonio Cartón	21 March 1980 (aged 21)	Left Winger
11	Spain	Hector Castresana	30 August 1975 (aged 25)	Line Player
13	Sweden	Magnus Andersson	17 May 1966 (aged 35)	Central Back
14	Spain	Juan Pérez	3 January 1974 (aged 27)	Line Player
15	Spain	Alejandro Garcia Pinto	8 February 1982 (aged 19)	Left Back
16	Spain	Armand Torrego	27 October 1973 (aged 27)	Goalkeeper
17	Russia	Denis Krivochlykov	10 May 1971 (aged 30)	Right Winger
18	Spain	Iker Romero	15 June 1980 (aged 20)	Left Back
20	Spain	Carlos Rodríguez Prendes	18 July 1982 (aged 18)	Line Player
21	Switzerland	Carlos Lima	21 February 1970 (aged 31)	Left Winger
-	Spain	Manolo Cadenas	20 May 1955 (aged 46)	Coach

== Top goal scorers ==
Top scorers are:

#	Player	Team	Goals	Games	Mean
1	(Spain) Julio Muñoz	BM Gáldar	169	26	6,5
2	(Spain) Alberto Entrerríos	Caja España Ademar León	163	26	6.3
3	(Spain) Ion Belaustegui	FC Barcelona	132	26	5.1
4	(Croatia) Zvonimir Bilić	Valencia Airtel	130	26	5.0
5	(Federal Republic of Yugoslavia) Mladen Bojinović	CD Bidasoa	126	26	4.8
