= Juan Francisco Muñoz =

Spanish handball player (born 1959)

Personal information
- Full name: Juan Francisco Muñoz Melo
- Nationality: Spain
- Born: 25 June 1959 (age 67) Santander, Spain
- Height: 195 cm (77 in)

Sport
- Sport: Handball
- Position: Left back

Youth career
- Years: Team
- –: Instituto José María de Pereda
- –: BM Valladolid
- –: BM Salesianos

Senior clubs
- Years: Team
- 1977-1981: CB Calpisa
- 1981-1988: FC Barcelona Handbol
- 1977-1981: Teka
National team
Years	Team	Apps	(Gls)
?-?	Spain	243	(701)

Juan Francisco Muñoz Melo (Note: In this Spanish name, the first or paternal surname is Muñoz and the second or maternal family name is Melo.) (born 25 June 1959) is a former Spanish male handball player. He was a member of the Spain men's national handball team, where he has the fourth most all time appearances for an outfield player and sixth-most overall. He also have the fourth most all time goals, behind Juanín García, Iker Romero and Alberto Entrerríos. He was part of the team at the 1980 Summer Olympics, 1984 Summer Olympics, 1988 Summer Olympics and 1992 Summer Olympics.

On club level he started his senior career at CB Calpisa in Alicante, where he won the 1978 Spanish championship and 1979 Copa del Rey de Balonmano. In 1981 he joined FC Barcelona, where he played until 1988. In this period he won the Spanish championship 3 times and the Copa del Rey 4 times and 3 times the EHF Cup Winners' Cup.

In 1988 he left Barcelona to join his hometown club Teka, where he once again won the Spanish league and cup.
