= 2015 Copa ASOBAL =

XXVI Copa ASOBAL 2015

Tournament details
- Venue(s): Palacio de los Deportes (in León host cities)
- Dates: 19 – 20 December
- Teams: 4

Final positions
- Champions: FC Barcelona Lassa (11th title)
- Runner-up: Naturhouse La Rioja

Tournament statistics
- Matches played: 3
- Goals scored: 183 (61 per match)
- Attendance: 11,400 (3,800 per match)
- Top scorer(s): Cristian Malmagro, 19

Awards
- Best player: Cristian Malmagro

The 2015 Copa ASOBAL was the 26th edition of the Copa ASOBAL. It took place like the previous year in the Palacio de los Deportes, in León, Castile and León, on 19 and 20 December 2015. The tournament was hosted by ABANCA Ademar León and León city council, being the sixth time León hosted Copa ASOBAL.

FC Barcelona Lassa won its 11th Copa ASOBAL by defeating Naturhouse La Rioja 35–31 in the Final.

== Qualified teams ==
Qualified teams for this edition are the top three teams on standings at midseason (matchday 15) plus the host team (ABANCA Ademar León).

#	Team	P	W	D	L	G+	G−	Dif	Pts
1	FC Barcelona	15	15	0	0	581	378	203	30
2	Naturhouse La Rioja	15	11	1	3	482	414	68	23
3	Frigoríficos del Morrazo	15	10	1	4	425	415	10	21
5*	ABANCA Ademar León	15	9	2	4	439	390	49	20

(*) Host team.

== Venue ==
León
Palacio de los Deportes
Capacity: 5,188
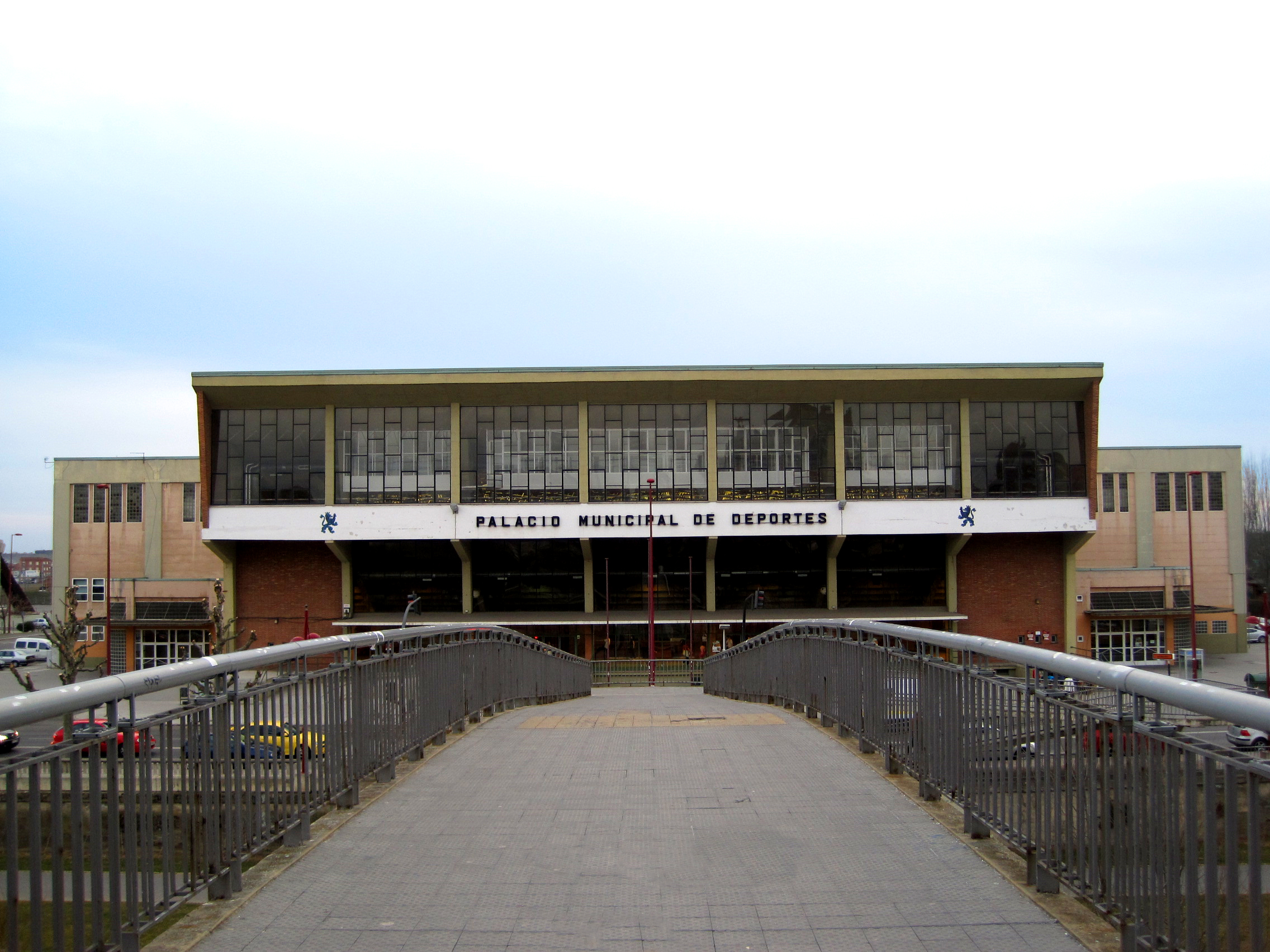

== Matches ==
Semifinals
1	FC Barcelona Lassa	34
3	Frigoríficos del Morrazo	21
5	ABANCA Ademar León	30
2	Naturhouse La Rioja	32

Final
1	FC Barcelona Lassa	35
2	Naturhouse La Rioja	31

=== Semifinals ===
19 December; 17:45 (UTC+1)	FC Barcelona Lassa	34–21	Frigoríficos del Morrazo	Palacio de los Deportes, León; Attendance: 3,900; Referees: García Mosquera, Muro San José
19 December; 17:45 (UTC+1)	Jallouz 7	(19–10)	Rosales, 6	Palacio de los Deportes, León; Attendance: 3,900; Referees: García Mosquera, Muro San José
19 December; 17:45 (UTC+1)	3× (yellow card) 3× (suspension)	Report	3× (yellow card) 1× (suspension)	Palacio de los Deportes, León; Attendance: 3,900; Referees: García Mosquera, Muro San José

19 December; 20:00 (UTC+1)	ABANCA Ademar León	30–32	Naturhouse La Rioja	Palacio de los Deportes, León; Attendance: 4,000; Referees: Raluy López, Sabroso Ramírez
19 December; 20:00 (UTC+1)	Vieyra, Zildžić 5	(13–16)	Malmagro 10	Palacio de los Deportes, León; Attendance: 4,000; Referees: Raluy López, Sabroso Ramírez
19 December; 20:00 (UTC+1)	3× (yellow card) 4× (suspension)	Report	2× (yellow card) 3× (suspension)	Palacio de los Deportes, León; Attendance: 4,000; Referees: Raluy López, Sabroso Ramírez

=== Final ===
20 December; 16:45 (UTC+1)	FC Barcelona Lassa	35–31	Naturhouse La Rioja	Palacio de los Deportes, León; Attendance: 3,500; Referees: Raluy López, Sabroso Ramírez
20 December; 16:45 (UTC+1)	Lazarov 10	(18–18)	Malmagro 9	Palacio de los Deportes, León; Attendance: 3,500; Referees: Raluy López, Sabroso Ramírez
20 December; 16:45 (UTC+1)	3× (yellow card) 2× (suspension)	Report	3× (yellow card) 3× (suspension)	Palacio de los Deportes, León; Attendance: 3,500; Referees: Raluy López, Sabroso Ramírez

2015 Copa ASOBAL winners
(Catalonia)
FC Barcelona Lassa
Eleventh title

== TV coverage ==
The tournament was broadcast in Spain in Canal+ Deportes 2 HD and worldwide via LAOLA1.tv

== Top goalscorers ==
Player	Team	Goals
(Spain) Cristian Malmagro	Naturhouse La Rioja	19
(North Macedonia) Kiril Lazarov	FC Barcelona Lassa	16
(Tunisia) Wael Jallouz	FC Barcelona Lassa	14
(Spain) Ángel Fernández	Naturhouse La Rioja	13
(Spain) Carlos Molina	Naturhouse La Rioja	12

== See also ==
- 2015–16 Liga ASOBAL
- 2015–16 Copa del Rey de Balonmano
