= Manuel Colón =

Spanish handball player (born 1977)

Personal information
- Full name: Manuel Colón Rodríguez
- Nationality: Spanish
- Born: 18 February 1977 (age 49) Madrid, Spain
- Height: 195 cm (77 in)

Sport
- Sport: Handball
- Position: Left back

Senior clubs
- Years: Team
- 1995-2006: Ademar León
- 2006-2007: BM Altea
- 2007-2011: BM Alcobendas
National team
Years	Team	Apps	(Gls)
1997-2011	Spain	85	(177)

Manuel Colón (born 18 February 1977) is a Spanish retired handball player. He competed in the men's tournament at the 2004 Summer Olympics.

He was a part of the clubs including Ademar Leon (1995 - 2006), BM Altea (2006 - 2007) and BM Alcobendas (2007 - 2009). In 2015 he made a short comeback for BM Alcobendas. With Ademar Leon, he won the Spanish championship in 2001, the Spanish cup in 2002 and the Copa ASOBAL in 1999.
