= Mosic =

Mosic is a surname. Notable people with the surname include:

- Ivan Mošić (born 1994), Serbian handballer
- Višnja Mosić (1870–1937), Serbian fighter during World War I

== See also ==
- Moosic, Pennsylvania
