= Juan Pérez (handballer) =

Spanish handball player (born 1974)

Juancho Pérez
Personal information
- Full name: Juan Pérez Márquez
- Nationality: Spanish
- Born: 3 January 1974 (age 52) Badajoz, Spain
- Height: 2.05 m (6 ft 9 in)

Sport
- Sport: Handball
- Position: Pivot
- Current club: Retired

Senior clubs
- Years: Team
- 1994-1996: FC Barcelona
- 1996-2008: BM Valladolid
- 1998-2001: Ademar León
- 2001-2009: SDC San Antonio
- 2011-2012: Badajoz Escubal
National team
Years	Team	Apps	(Gls)
1995-2007	Spain	203	(228)
Medal record
Summer Olympics
Bronze medal – third place	1996 Atlanta	Team
Bronze medal – third place	2000 Sydney	Team
World Championship
Gold medal – first place	2005 Tunisia
European Championship
Silver medal – second place	1996 Spain
Silver medal – second place	1998 Italy
Silver medal – second place	2006 Switzerland
Bronze medal – third place	2000 Croatia

Juan "Juancho" Pérez Márquez (born 3 January 1974) is a Spanish handball player who won the 2005 World Men's Handball Championship.

== Career ==
Juancho Pérez played from 1994 to 1996 for FC Barcelona, where he won the 1996 Spanish championship, 1995 and 1996 Copa ASOBAL, 1995 EHF Cup Winners' Cup and the 1996 EHF Champions League.

In 1996 he joined BM Valladolid. Here he did however not win any titles. In 1998 he joined league rivals Ademar León, where he won the 2001 Spanish championship and the 2000 Copa ASOBAL and EHF Cup Winners' Cup

In 2001 he joined SDC San Antonio, where he won the 2001 Copa del Rey and EHF Champions League, the 2002 Spanish championship, 2004 EHF Cup Winners' Cup and the 2005 Spanish Championship. He retired in 2009. After his playing days he became the president of the Spanish second tier side Badajoz Escubal, a club from Badajoz, the town, where Pérez was born. In 2011 he unretired to play for them.

=== National team ===
Juancho Pérez featured in the national team for more than a decade. His biggest achievement was winning the 2005 World Championship in Tunisia.

competed in the 1996 Summer Olympics, in the 2000 Summer Olympics, and in the 2004 Summer Olympics. In 1996 he won the bronze medal with the Spanish team. He played three matches and scored five goals.

Four years later he won his second bronze medal with the Spanish handball team in the 2000 Olympic tournament. He played five matches and scored four goals.

At the 2004 Games he was part of the Spanish team which finished seventh in the Olympic tournament. He played two matches and scored three goals.

He also won silver medals four times at the European championships, at the 1996, 1998, 2000 and 2006 European Championships.

In the latter stages of his national team career he was however only third choice behind Rolando Uríos and Julen Aguinagalde.
