= Manolo Cadenas =

Spanish handball coach

Manolo Cadenas Montañés
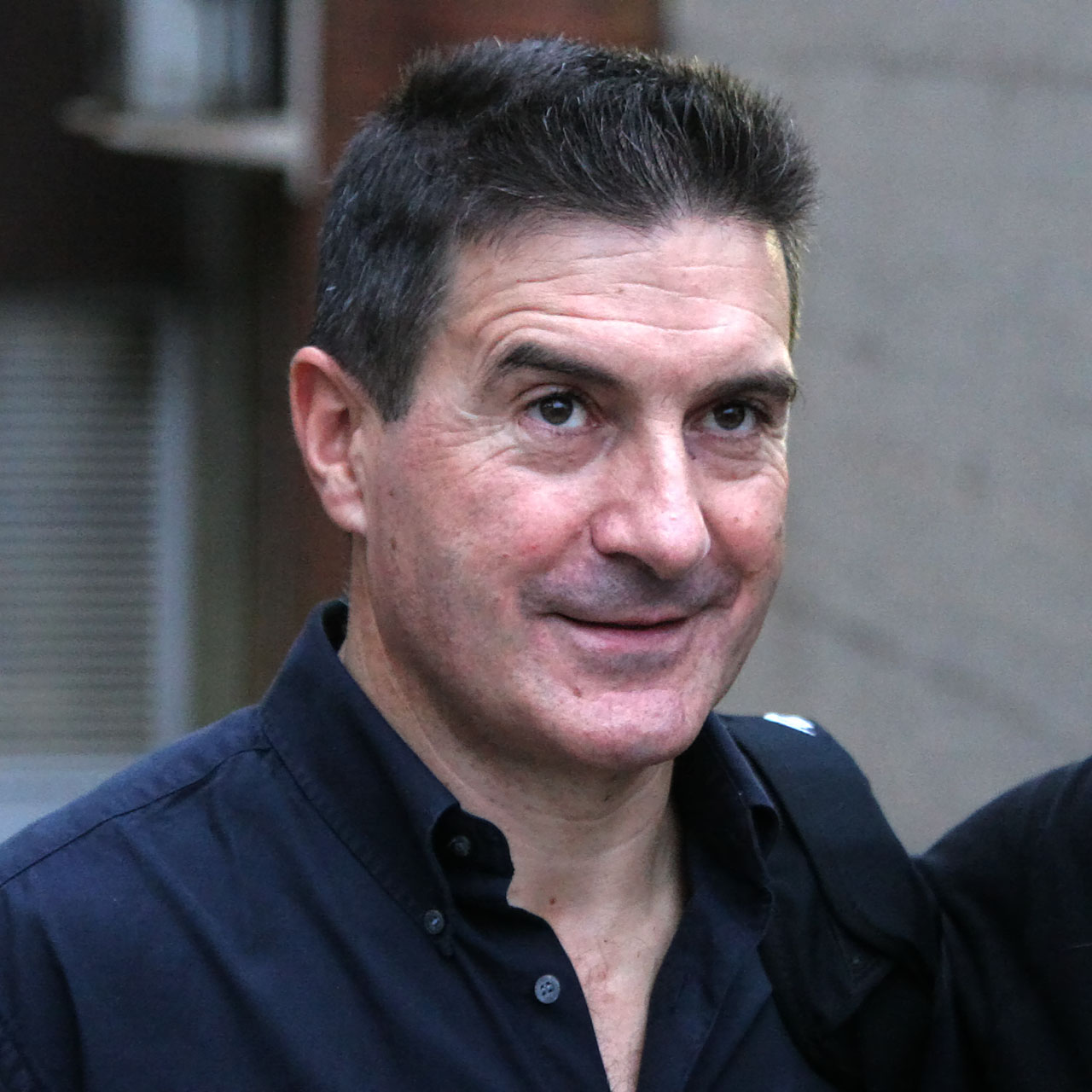

Personal information
- Nationality: Spanish
- Born: 20 May 1955 (age 71) Valdevimbre, Spain

Sport
- Sport: Handball

Teams managed
- Years: Team
- 1986–1989: CB Naranco
- 1989–1991: CB Cantabria
- 1991–1995: BM Valladolid
- 1995–2007: Ademar León
- 2007–2009: FC Barcelona
- 2010–2012: BM Granollers
- 2012–2013: Ademar León
- 2013–2016: Orlen Wisła Płock
- 2013–2016: Spain
- 2017–2021: Argentina
- 2018–2019: HC Meshkov Brest
- 2019–2023: Ademar León
Medal record
European Championship
Bronze medal – third place	2014 Denmark
Silver medal – second place	2016 Poland

Manolo Cadenas Montañés (born 20 May 1955) is a Spain-born handball coach.
