= Viran Morros =

Spanish handball player (born 1983)

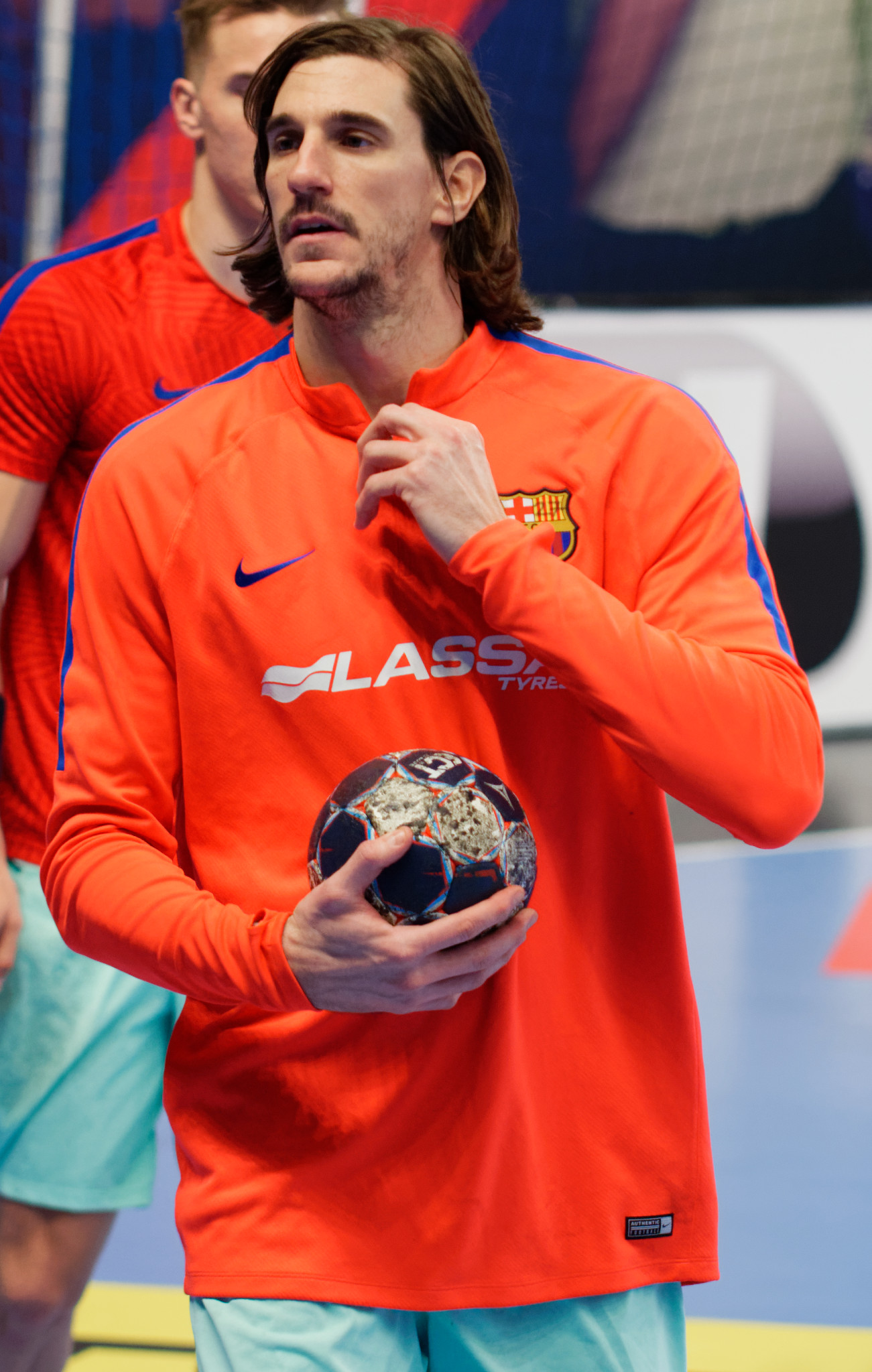
- Morros in 2016

Personal information
- Full name: Viran Morros de Argila
- Nationality: Spanish
- Born: 15 December 1983 (age 42) Barcelona, Spain
- Height: 1.99 m (6 ft 6 in)

Sport
- Sport: Handball
- Position: Left back

Youth career
- Years: Team
- –: FC Barcelona

Senior clubs
- Years: Team
- 2000–2003: FC Barcelona
- 2003–2004: SD Teucro
- 2004–2007: CB Ademar León
- 2007–2011: BM Ciudad Real
- 2011–2018: FC Barcelona
- 2018–2021: Paris Saint-Germain
- 2021–2022: Füchse Berlin
- 2022–2024: Pfadi Winterthur
National team
Years	Team	Apps	(Gls)
2003–2024	Spain	259	(169)

Teams managed
- 2026 -: (Switzerland) HSC Suhr Aarau (Head of Youth Elite Sports)
Medal record
Olympic Games
Bronze medal – third place	2020 Tokyo	Team
World Championship
Gold medal – first place	2013 Spain
Bronze medal – third place	2011 Sweden
Bronze medal – third place	2021 Egypt
European Championship
Gold medal – first place	2018 Croatia
Gold medal – first place	2020 Sweden/Austria/Norway
Silver medal – second place	2016 Poland
Bronze medal – third place	2014 Denmark
Mediterranean Games
Gold medal – first place	2005 Spain

Viran Morros de Argila (born 15 December 1983) is a retired Spanish handball player. He is regarded as one of the best defensive players of his time.

He was inducted into the EHF Hall of Fame in 2024.

== Career ==
Morros started playing handball late at the age of 15. Until then he had been playing soccer, where he was discovered by FC Barcelonas coaches at a sommercamp hosted by Valero Rivera López.

In the 2000/2001 season, he became a part of the first team. He debuted in Liga ASOBAL on October 17th 2002. He did however not cement his place and played only 8 matches in three seasons for the club. He won both the Spanish League, Spanish Cup and Spanish Supercup while at the club as well as the EHF European League in 2003.

To get better playing time he joined league rivals SD Teucro. Here he played primarily as a defender at first. Here he drew interest from both BM Valladolid and Ademar León, and he signed for the latter. Here he played from 2004 to 2007. It was here he developed as a true defensive specialist. His biggest achievement with the club was winning the EHF Cup Winners' Cup in 2004/05.

In 2007, he joined BM Ciudad Real, managed by Talant Dujshebaev. Here he won the Spanish league three times (in 2007-08, 2008-09 and 2009-10), twice the EHF Champions League (2008 and 2009) and the 2010 IHF Super Globe.

Despite the club wanting to keep him, he returned to FC Barcelona in 2010. Here he won the Spanish league seven times in a row from 2011/12 to 2017/18, the Spanish cup 5 times (2014, 2015, 2016, 2017, and 2018) and the Copa ASOBAL and the Spanish Supercup seven times in a row from 2012 to 2018. He also won the 2013 IHF Super Globe and 2014. Between 2000 and 2018 he played 434 matches in the Spanish League, scoring 514 goals. Seven times he was named as the best defender in the league.

In 2018, he joined French side Paris Saint-Germain on a deal until 2020. Here he won the French Championship three times. In the 2019/2020 season, he was named best defender in the league.

In 2021, Morros moved to Germany and joined Füchse Berlin on a one year deal.

In 2022, he moved to Switzerland to join Pfadi Winterthur. He retired after the 2023/24 season.

== National team ==
Morros played for the Spanish youth team between 2001 and 2003.

He played his first match on the Spanish national team on June 13th 2003.

He first tasted success with national team, when he won the 2005 Mediterranean Games.

At the 2012 European Men's Handball Championship, where Spain finished 4th he was in the all star team as best defender.

At the 2013 World Men's Handball Championship at home he won gold medals with the Spanish team. The year after he won bronze medals at the 2014 European Men's Handball Championship. At the 2016 European Men's Handball Championship he won silver medals.

He also participated at the 2015, 2017 and 2019 World Men's Handball Championship.

He once again won medals with the Spanish team at the 2018 European Men's Handball Championship and at the 2020 Championship he defended his title.

At the 2020 Olympics he was injured in the third match and could not continue.

His last major international tournament was the 2024 European Men's Handball Championship, where Spain finished 13th.

He played his last match for the national team on May 12th 2024, more than 20 years after his debut.

== Titles ==
During his career he won a total of 53 titles.

Club:

- 10 × Liga ASOBAL: 2003, 2008, 2009, 2010, 2012, 2013, 2014, 2015, 2016, 2017 und 2018
- 7 × Spanish Supercup 2001, 2008, 2011, 2013, 2014, 2015, 2016, 2017 und 2018
- 9 × Copa ASOBAL 2001, 2002, 2008, 2011, 2012, 2013, 2014, 2015, 2016, 2017 und 2018
- 7 × Copa del Rey 2008, 2011, 2014, 2015, 2016, 2017 und 2018
- 3 × French Championship 2019, 2020 und 2021
- French Cup 2021
- EHF European League 2003
- EHF Champions Trophy 2003
- EHF Cup Winner's Cup 2005
- EHF Champions League 2008, 2009 und 2015
- 3 × IHF Men's Super Globe 2010, 2013 und 2014

National team:

- 2005 Mediterranean Games: Gold
- World Championship 2011: Bronze
- World Championship 2013: Gold
- European Champion 2014: Bronze
- European Champion 2016: Silver
- European Champion 2018: Gold
- European Champion 2020: Gold
- World Championship 2021: Bronze
- Olympic Games 2020: Bronze

== Individual awards ==
- Best Defence Player of the European Championship: 2012
- EHF Hall of Fame in 2024.
