= Mikel Aguirrezabalaga =

Spanish handball player (born 1984)

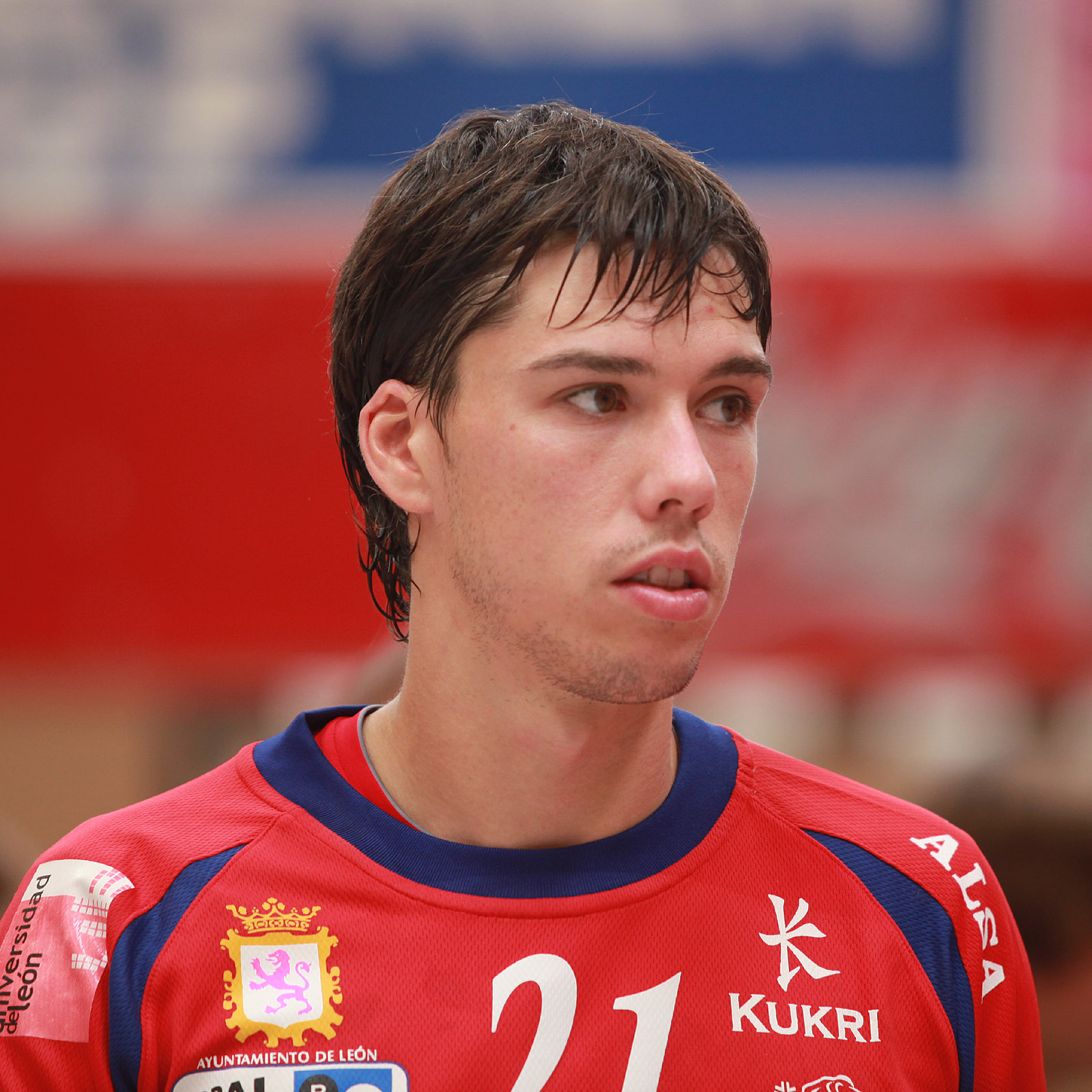

Personal information
- Full name: Mikel Aguirrezabalaga García
- Nationality: ESP
- Born: 8 April 1984 (age 42) Zarautz, Spain
- Height: 1.94 m (6 ft 4 in)

Sport
- Sport: Handball
- Position: LB
- Current club: Anaitasuna

Senior clubs
- Years: Team
- 2002–2004: FC Barcelona
- 2004–2007: Alcobendas
- 2007–2011: Reale Ademar León
- 2011–2013: FC Barcelona
- 2013–2014: Dinamo Minsk
- 2014–2016: Ademar León
- 2016–: Anaitasuna
National team
Years	Team	Apps	(Gls)
2008–2012	Spain	35	(61)

Mikel Aguirrezabalaga (born 8 April 1984) is a Spanish handball player. At the 2012 Summer Olympics he competed with the Spain men's national handball team in the men's tournament.
