= David Fernández Alonso =

Spanish handball player (born 1996)

David Fernández
Personal information
- Full name: David Fernández Alonso
- Nationality: Spanish
- Born: 14 April 1996 (age 30) Valladolid, Spain
- Height: 1.96 m (6 ft 5 in)

Sport
- Sport: Handball
- Position: Right back
- Current club: FC Porto
- Number: 14

Senior clubs
- Years: Team
- 2013–2014: BM Valladolid
- 2014–2015: BM Nava
- 2015–2016: Atlético Valladolid
- 2016–2020: Abanca Ademar León
- 2020–2023: Wisła Płock
- 2022–2023: → Abanca Ademar León
- 2023–: FC Porto
National team
Years	Team	Apps	(Gls)
2019–	Spain	6	(10)
- Updated on 5 August 2023

David Fernández (born 14 April 1996) is a Spanish handball player for FC Porto and the Spanish national team.
