= Jordi Ribera =

Spanish handball coach

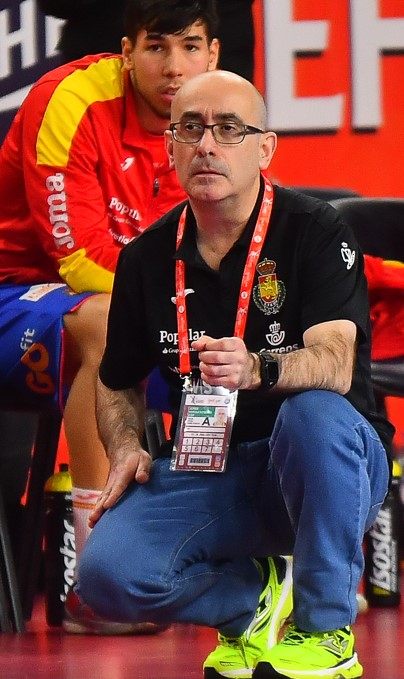
- Ribera in 2018

Personal information
- Full name: Jordi Ribera Romans
- Nationality: Spanish
- Born: 3 May 1963 (age 63) Sarrià de Ter, Spain

Sport
- Sport: Handball
- Current club: Spain (manager)

Teams managed
- Years: Team
- 1984–1988: Sarrià
- 1989–1992: Arrate
- 1992–2003: Gáldar
- 2003–2004: Bidasoa
- 2004–2005: Argentina
- 2005–2008: Brazil
- 2007–2011: Ademar
- 2012–2016: Brazil
- 2016–: Spain

Jordi Ribera Romans (born 3 May 1963) is a Spanish handball coach of the Spain national team.
