= CB Ademar León =

Spanish handball club

Abanca Ademar León
- Full name: Club Balonmano Abanca Ademar León
- Nickname(s): Maristas, Ademaristas, Leones, Blancos
- Founded: 1956; 70 years ago
- Arena: Palacio de los Deportes de León, León
- Capacity: 5,188
- President: Cayetano Franco
- Head coach: Dani Gordo
- League: Liga ASOBAL
- 2024–25: 6th
Home	Away
- Website ademar.comOfficial site

Abanca Ademar León is a Spanish handball team based in León, Spain. It plays in Liga ASOBAL.

Location of Ademar León

== History ==
Founded in 1956, Ademar León is the handball team of the city of León. Until 1975 it played in the provincial categories when not existing economic availability to be able to promotion. In that year the team promoted to 1ª División Nacional (being player of the team the currently chairman, Juan Arias). Its 6th place in 1995–96 allowed the club to play for the first time in its history a European competition (EHF City Cup). In 1996–97 Runner-up of Liga ASOBAL, and runner-up of ASOBAL Cup was able to proclaim itself, being third in the Copa del Rey and obtaining seat to play the EHF Champions League in the following season. In its home country, the club became champion a total of 1 time (2001) and won the Copa del Rey once (2002), the ASOBAL Cup twice (1999, 2009). The club won 2 international cups: EHF Cup Winner's Cup in 1999 and 2005.

== Crest, colours, supporters ==
=== Kit manufacturers ===
Period	Kit manufacturer
2014	(Spain) Rasán
2014 - 2017	(Denmark) Hummel
2017 - present	(Italy) Kappa

=== Kits ===
HOME
2013–14	2015–16	2016–17

AWAY
2013–14	2015–16	2016–17	2017–18

THIRD
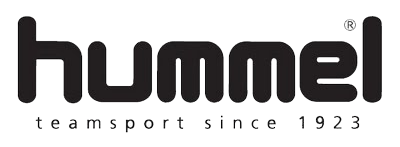
2016–17

== Sports Hall information ==
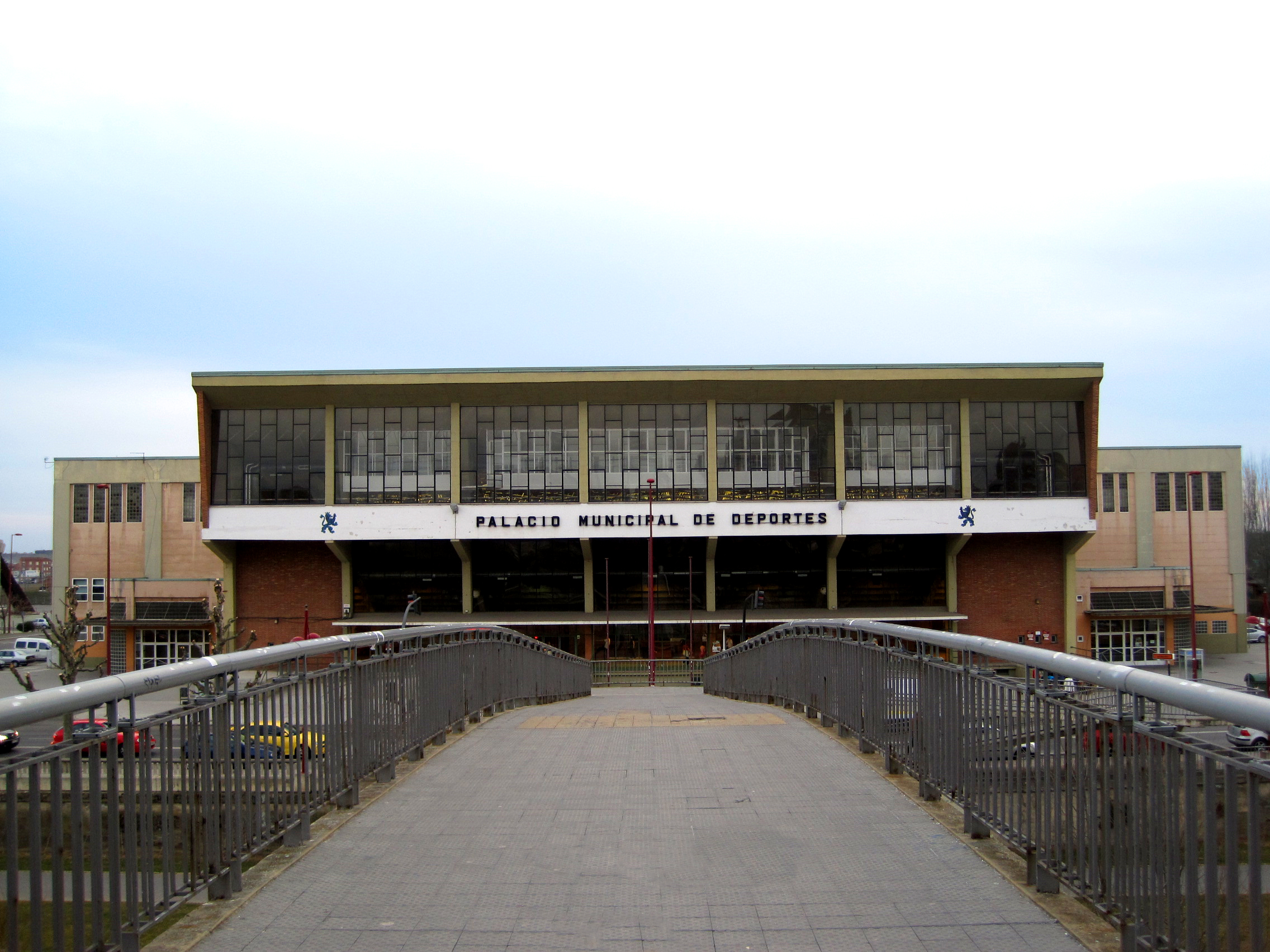
Home hall: Palacio de los Deportes de León

- Name: – Palacio de los Deportes de León
- City: – León
- Capacity: – 5188
- Address: – Av. del Ing. Sáenz de Miera, s/n, 24009, León, Spain

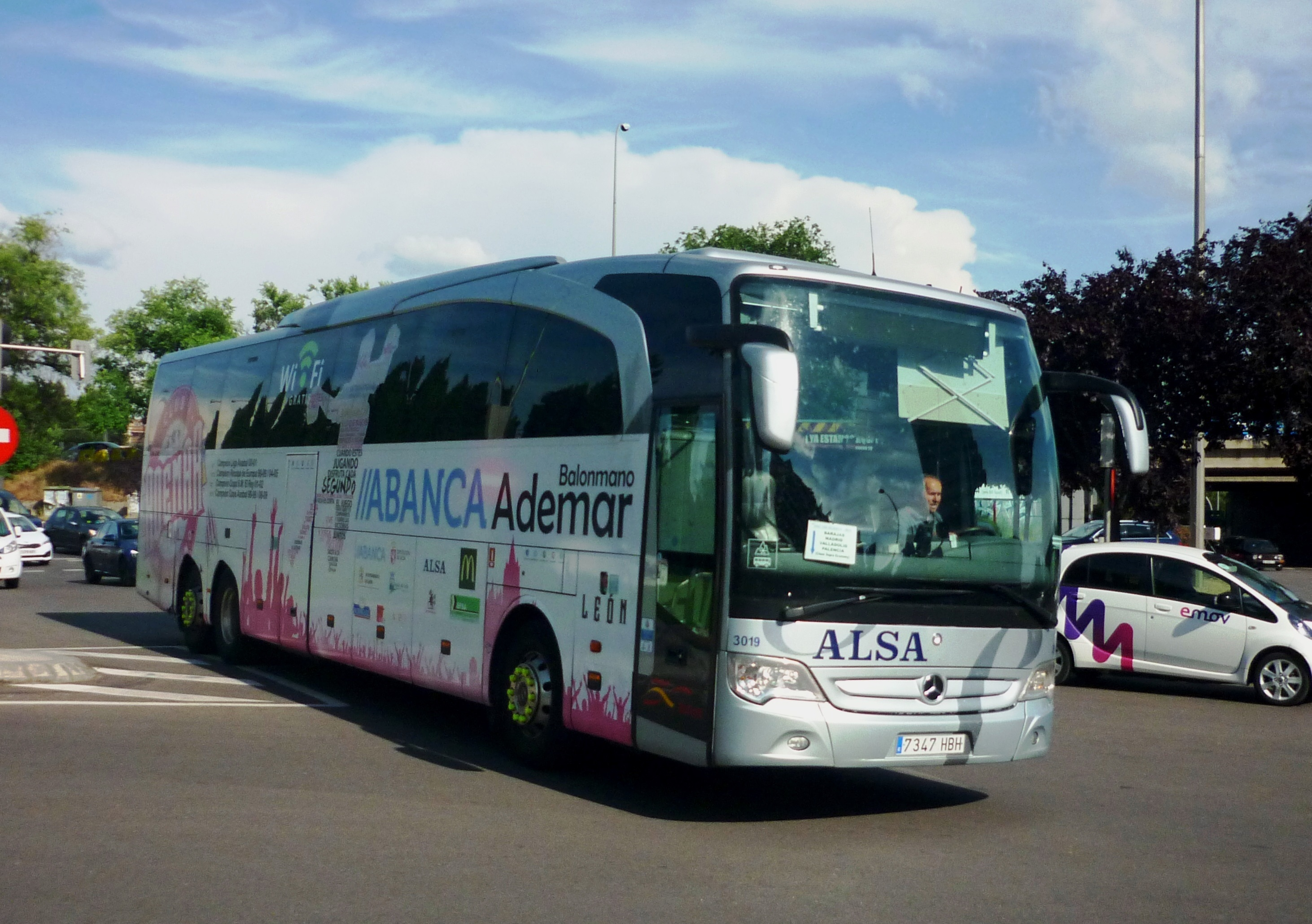
Ademar León teambus 2018

== Management ==
Position	Name
President	(Spain) Cayetano Franco
Vice President	(Spain) René Mira Rubio
Economic Vice President	(Spain) Rocio García Gimeno
Sports Vice President	(Spain) Jose Carlos Cabero Amez

== Team ==
=== Current squad ===
Squad for the 2022–23 season

Ademar León

Goalkeepers

- 1 (Iran) Saeid Barkhordari
- 12 (Greece) Panagiotis Papantonopoulos
- 99 (Spain) Carlos Honrado

Left Wingers

- 5 (Spain) Adrian Casqueiro
- 8 (Spain) Dario Sanz

Right Wingers

- 13 (South Korea) Kim Jin-Young
- 17 (Spain) Álvaro Duarte Zapico
- 24 (Spain) Antonio Martínez

Line Players

- 21 (Portugal) Tiago Filipe Mota de Sousa
- 65 (Brazil) Guilherme Borges Moraes Silva

Central Backs

- 3 (Spain) Javier Miñambres
- 15 (Spain) Juan Castro Álvarez
- 18 (Lithuania) Zanas Virbauskas
- 39 (Lithuania) Deividas Virbauskas

Left Backs

- 14 (Serbia) Marko Milosavljević
- 20 (Greece) Theodoros Boskos

Right Backs

- 7 (Bosnia and Herzegovina) Stjepan Jozinović
- 22 (Spain) David Fernández Alonso

=== Technical staff ===
- Head coach: (Spain) Manolo Cadenas
- Assistant coach: (Spain) Luis Puertas Castrillo
- Physiotherapist: (Spain) Jorge Fernández Cabezón

=== Transfers ===
Transfers for the 2026–27 season

Joining

- (Spain) Juan Castro Álvarez (CB) from (Switzerland) Kadetten Schaffhausen
- (Spain) Adrián Casqueiro (LW) from (France) Pays d'Aix Université Club

Leaving

- (Iran) Saeid Barkhordari (GK) to (Spain) Balonmano Torrelavega
- (Spain) Darío Sanz (LW) to (Germany) TVB Stuttgart
- (Spain) Samuel Saiz (LB) to (Spain) CB Ciudad de Logroño
- (Spain) Aitor Albizu (CB) to (Spain) CB Caserío Ciudad Real
- (Spain) Sergio Sánchez Vidán (LW) to (Spain) BM Atlético Valladolid
- (Spain) Rodrigo Pérez Arce (CB) to (Spain) CB Burgos

=== Transfer History ===
Transfers for the 2025–26 season

Joining

- (Spain) Gonzalo Pérez Arce (RW) from (Germany) SG BBM Bietigheim
- (Spain) Aitor Albizu (CB) from (Spain) Helvetia Anaitasuna
- (Spain) Samuel Saiz (LB) back from loan at (Spain) BM Villa de Aranda

Leaving

- (Serbia) Ivan Popović (LP) to (Spain) CB Ciudad de Logroño
- (Spain) Carlos Álvarez (RW) to (Portugal) Sporting CP

== Previous Squads ==
2019–2020 Team
Shirt No	Nationality	Player	Birth Date	Position
2	Spain	Rubén Marchán	20 September 1994 (age 32)	Line Player
3	Spain	Mario Lopez Alvarez	19 September 1994 (age 32)	Right Winger
4	Chile	Erwin Feuchtmann	2 May 1990 (age 36)	Left Back
7	Argentina	Gonzalo Carou	15 August 1979 (age 47)	Line Player
8	Croatia	Tin Lučin	16 August 1999 (age 27)	Central Back
9	Argentina	Pedro Martínez Cami	20 December 1999 (age 26)	Central Back
11	Argentina	Federico Matías Vieyra	21 July 1988 (age 38)	Right Back
12	United States	Andrew Donlin	9 February 1992 (age 34)	Line Player
14	Spain	David Fernández Alonso	14 April 1996 (age 30)	Right Back
15	Spain	Juan José Fernández	18 February 1993 (age 33)	Left Back
16	Croatia	Dino Slavić	4 December 1992 (age 33)	Goalkeeper
17	Spain	Jaime Fernández Fernández	27 January 1997 (age 29)	Left Winger
18	Brazil	Acacio Marques Moreira Filho	26 January 1994 (age 32)	Central Back
19	Spain	Gonzalo Pérez Arce	20 July 1998 (age 28)	Right Winger
20	Serbia	Ivan Mošić	23 December 1994 (age 31)	Left Back
22	Spain	José Mario Carrillo	18 December 1990 (age 35)	Left Winger
23	Spain	Álex Lodos	26 June 2002 (age 24)	Left Back
30	Belarus	Dzmitry Patotski	3 October 1992 (age 34)	Goalkeeper
85	Spain	Adrian Casqueiro	18 May 2000 (age 26)	Left Winger
99	Spain	Carlos Honrado	2 December 2003 (age 22)	Goalkeeper

2017–2018 Team
Shirt No	Nationality	Player	Birth Date	Position
1	Spain	Ignacio Biosca	17 July 1995 (age 31)	Goalkeeper
3	Spain	Mario Lopez Alvarez	19 September 1994 (age 32)	Right Winger
4	Argentina	Sebastián Simonet	12 May 1986 (age 40)	Central Back
5	Serbia	Predrag Vejin	17 December 1992 (age 33)	Right Back
6	Spain	Juanín García	28 August 1977 (age 49)	Left Winger
7	Argentina	Gonzalo Carou	15 August 1979 (age 47)	Line Player
8	Spain	Rodrigo Pérez Arce	4 October 1995 (age 31)	Central Back
10	Spain	Diego Piñeiro	12 September 1994 (age 32)	Line Player
11	Argentina	Federico Matías Vieyra	21 July 1988 (age 38)	Right Back
12	Spain	Javier González Teijón	7 January 1996 (age 30)	Goalkeeper
14	Spain	David Fernández Alonso	14 April 1996 (age 30)	Right Back
15	Spain	Juan José Fernández	18 February 1993 (age 33)	Left Back
16	Serbia	Vladimir Cupara	19 February 1994 (age 32)	Goalkeeper
17	Spain	Jaime Fernández Fernández	27 January 1997 (age 29)	Left Winger
18	Brazil	Acacio Marques Moreira Filho	26 January 1994 (age 32)	Central Back
19	Spain	Gonzalo Pérez Arce	20 July 1998 (age 28)	Right Winger
25	Serbia	Živan Pešić	7 July 1993 (age 33)	Line Player
32	Spain	Sergio Alvarez Dominguez	6 January 1997 (age 29)	Goalkeeper
37	Spain	Alejandro Costoya	6 May 1993 (age 33)	Left Back
85	Spain	Adrian Casqueiro	18 May 2000 (age 26)	Left Winger

2013–2014 Team
Shirt No	Nationality	Player	Birth Date	Position
1	Spain	Rogelio Llamazares Roldan	9 July 1979 (age 47)	Goalkeeper
3	Spain	Mario Lopez Alvarez	19 September 1994 (age 32)	Right Winger
4	Spain	Sergio Mellado Sanchez	5 April 1989 (age 37)	Central Back
5	Serbia	Predrag Vejin	17 December 1992 (age 33)	Right Back
7	Argentina	Gonzalo Carou	15 August 1979 (age 47)	Line Player
8	Spain	Rodrigo Pérez Arce	4 October 1995 (age 31)	Central Back
9	Spain	Alberto Molina Martinez	14 January 1993 (age 33)	Central Back
10	Spain	Diego Piñeiro	12 September 1994 (age 32)	Line Player
11	Spain	Jorge García Vega	6 August 1976 (age 50)	Central Back
13	Spain	Juan Castro Álvarez	31 October 1990 (age 35)	Central Back
14	Spain	Inigo Jorajuria Calvo	7 May 1992 (age 34)	Right Winger
15	Spain	José Mario Carrillo	18 December 1990 (age 35)	Left Winger
16	Croatia	Matej Ašanin	4 September 1993 (age 33)	Goalkeeper
18	Russia	Alexander Tatarintsev	13 March 1990 (age 36)	Left Back
19	Spain	Ricardo Diez Villamañán	19 May 1988 (age 38)	Right Back
21	Spain	Mario Alvarez Freijo	3 December 1990 (age 35)	Left Back
22	Brazil	Leonardo Domenech de Almeida	2 September 1992 (age 34)	Line Player
25	Serbia	Predrag Dačević	21 July 1986 (age 40)	Left Back
29	Spain	Javier García López	16 May 1995 (age 31)	Line Player
32	Spain	Ivan Mendez Bayon	23 May 1993 (age 33)	Goalkeeper
73	Spain	Victor Alonso	9 March 1990 (age 36)	Right Back

2010–2011 Team
Shirt No	Nationality	Player	Birth Date	Position
1	Spain	Vicente Álamo	10 February 1976 (age 50)	Goalkeeper
2	Spain	Álvaro Cabanas	22 April 1990 (age 36)	Right Winger
3	Spain	Ander Ugarte Cortés	6 February 1990 (age 36)	Line Player
4	Spain	Jaime Gonzalez Fernandez	18 March 1990 (age 36)	Central Back
5	Spain	Iosu Goñi Leoz	4 January 1990 (age 36)	Left Back
7	Argentina	Gonzalo Carou	15 August 1979 (age 47)	Line Player
8	Spain	Ángel Montoro	10 April 1989 (age 37)	Right Back
9	Portugal	Ricardo Costa	28 October 1976 (age 49)	Right Winger
10	Spain	Jorge García Vega	6 August 1976 (age 50)	Central Back
11	Spain	Hector Castresana	30 August 1975 (age 51)	Line Player
12	Croatia	Venio Losert	25 July 1976 (age 50)	Goalkeeper
14	Spain	Juan Andreu	20 January 1985 (age 41)	Line Player
15	Spain	José Mario Carrillo	18 December 1990 (age 35)	Left Winger
16	Croatia	Denis Buntić	13 November 1982 (age 43)	Right Back
17	Russia	Denis Krivochlykov	10 May 1971 (age 55)	Right Winger
18	Russia	Danil Chernov	9 September 1981 (age 45)	Left Back
21	Spain	Mikel Aguirrezabalaga	8 April 1984 (age 42)	Left Back
22	Spain	Carlos Ruesga	10 March 1985 (age 41)	Central Back
23	Spain	Javier Ortigosa	17 January 1982 (age 44)	Left Winger
24	Slovakia	Martin Straňovský	12 September 1985 (age 41)	Left Winger
25	Serbia	Dalibor Čutura	14 June 1975 (age 51)	Central Back
32	Spain	Jacob Melian Moreno	10 February 1991 (age 35)	Goalkeeper

2008–2009 Team
Shirt No	Nationality	Player	Birth Date	Position
1	Spain	Vicente Álamo	10 February 1976 (age 50)	Goalkeeper
2	Spain	Álvaro Cabanas	22 April 1990 (age 36)	Right Winger
3	Spain	Jose Juan Gonzalez Novelle	27 February 1986 (age 40)	Left Back
4	Spain	Jaime Gonzalez Fernandez	18 March 1990 (age 36)	Central Back
7	Argentina	Gonzalo Carou	15 August 1979 (age 47)	Line Player
8	Spain	Ángel Montoro	10 April 1989 (age 37)	Right Back
9	Portugal	Ricardo Costa	28 October 1976 (age 49)	Right Winger
10	Spain	Jorge García Vega	6 August 1976 (age 50)	Central Back
11	Spain	Hector Castresana	30 August 1975 (age 51)	Line Player
12	Spain	Luis De Vega Martinez	14 September 1988 (age 38)	Goalkeeper
13	Spain	Julen Aguinagalde	8 December 1982 (age 43)	Line Player
15	Spain	Daniel Sarmiento	25 August 1983 (age 43)	Central Back
16	Croatia	Denis Buntić	13 November 1982 (age 43)	Right Back
17	Russia	Denis Krivochlykov	10 May 1971 (age 55)	Right Winger
18	Russia	Danil Chernov	9 September 1981 (age 45)	Left Back
21	Spain	Mikel Aguirrezabalaga	8 April 1984 (age 42)	Left Back
23	Spain	Javier Ortigosa	17 January 1982 (age 44)	Left Winger
24	Slovakia	Martin Straňovský	12 September 1985 (age 41)	Left Winger
26	Croatia	Igor Kos	17 February 1978 (age 48)	Right Back
32	Croatia	Mirko Alilović	15 September 1985 (age 41)	Goalkeeper
77	Croatia	Damir Bičanić	26 June 1985 (age 41)	Left Back

2004–2005 Team
Shirt No	Nationality	Player	Birth Date	Position
1	Spain	Jorge Martinez Martinez	9 August 1977 (age 49)	Goalkeeper
3	Norway	Stian Vatne	10 May 1974 (age 52)	Left Back
4	Serbia	Marko Ćuruvija	24 July 1981 (age 45)	Left Winger
5	Spain	Óscar Perales	9 December 1983 (age 42)	Central Back
6	Spain	Juanín García	28 August 1977 (age 49)	Left Winger
7	Spain	Víctor Díaz Diez	10 February 1984 (age 42)	Left Back
8	Spain	Manuel Colón	18 February 1977 (age 49)	Line Player
9	Spain	Raúl Entrerríos	12 February 1981 (age 45)	Central Back
11	Spain	Hector Castresana	30 August 1975 (age 51)	Line Player
12	Spain	Yeray Lamariano	11 March 1983 (age 43)	Goalkeeper
13	Spain	Alejandro Garza Hernandez	3 March 1986 (age 40)	Line Player
15	Norway	Kristian Kjelling	6 September 1980 (age 46)	Left Back
16	Norway	Ole Erevik	9 January 1981 (age 45)	Goalkeeper
17	Russia	Denis Krivochlykov	10 May 1971 (age 55)	Right Winger
19	Croatia	Petar Metličić	25 December 1976 (age 49)	Right Back
20	Spain	Carlos Rodríguez Prendes	18 July 1982 (age 44)	Line Player
22	Spain	Viran Morros	15 December 1983 (age 42)	Left Back
23	Spain	Roberto García Parrondo	12 January 1980 (age 46)	Right Winger

2000–2001 Team
Shirt No	Nationality	Player	Birth Date	Position
1	Denmark	Kasper Hvidt	6 February 1976 (age 50)	Goalkeeper
2	Spain	Alberto Entrerríos	7 November 1976 (age 49)	Left Back
3	Hungary	Csaba Bartók	18 May 1970 (age 56)	Right Back
5	Spain	Víctor Alvarez Fernández	13 March 1981 (age 45)	Central Back
6	Spain	Juanín García	28 August 1977 (age 49)	Left Winger
7	Argentina	Eric Gull	28 August 1973 (age 53)	Right Back
8	Spain	Manuel Colón	18 February 1977 (age 49)	Line Player
9	Spain	Iñaki Ordoñez	20 August 1968 (age 58)	Right Back
10	Spain	Antonio Cartón	21 March 1980 (age 46)	Left Winger
11	Spain	Hector Castresana	30 August 1975 (age 51)	Line Player
13	Sweden	Magnus Andersson	17 May 1966 (age 60)	Central Back
14	Spain	Juan Pérez	3 January 1974 (age 52)	Line Player
15	Spain	Alejandro Garcia Pinto	8 February 1982 (age 44)	Left Back
16	Spain	Armand Torrego	27 October 1973 (age 53)	Goalkeeper
17	Russia	Denis Krivochlykov	10 May 1971 (age 55)	Right Winger
18	Spain	Iker Romero	15 June 1980 (age 46)	Left Back
20	Spain	Carlos Rodríguez Prendes	18 July 1982 (age 44)	Line Player
21	Switzerland	Carlos Lima	21 February 1970 (age 56)	Left Winger

1998–1999 Team
Shirt No	Nationality	Player	Birth Date	Position
1	Spain	José Javier Hombrados	7 April 1972 (age 54)	Goalkeeper
2	Spain	Alberto Entrerríos	7 November 1976 (age 49)	Left Back
3	Spain	Juan José Panadero	10 May 1974 (age 52)	Right Back
5	Slovakia	Stanislav Demovič	20 September 1975 (age 51)	Right Back
6	Spain	Juanín García	28 August 1977 (age 49)	Left Winger
8	Spain	Manuel Colón	18 February 1977 (age 49)	Line Player
9	Spain	Juan Pérez	3 January 1974 (age 52)	Line Player
10	Spain	Fernando Hernández	24 February 1973 (age 53)	Right Winger
11	SerbiaPortugal	Vojislav Kraljić	25 September 1972 (age 54)	Left Back
12	Spain	Rogelio Llamazares Roldan	9 July 1979 (age 47)	Goalkeeper
13	Spain	Fernando Benes Diaz	10 December 1965 (age 60)	Right Winger
15	Spain	Rubén Garabaya	15 September 1978 (age 48)	Line Player
16	Spain	Armand Torrego	27 October 1973 (age 53)	Goalkeeper
17	Spain	Manuel Sancho	5 May 1980 (age 46)	Left Winger
18	Spain	José Luis Pérez Canca	8 May 1971 (age 55)	Central Back
19	Sweden	Diego Pérez Marne	22 February 1978 (age 48)	Central Back
20	Spain	Jorge García Vega	6 August 1976 (age 50)	Central Back

== Season by season ==
Season	Tier	Division	Pos.	Notes
1980–81	2	1ª Div. Nacional	2nd	
1981–82	2	1ª Div. Nacional	1st	Promoted
1982–83	1	Div. Honor	13th	Relegated
1983–84	2	1ª Div. Nacional	2nd	
1984–85	2	1ª Div. Nacional	1st	Promoted
1985–86	1	Div. Honor	12th	Relegated
1986–87	2	1ª Div. Nacional	7th	
1987–88	2	1ª Div. Nacional	12th	
1988–89	2	1ª Div. Nacional	10th	Relegated
1989–90	3	1ª Div. B	2nd	Promoted
1990–91	2	1ª Div. Nacional	4th	
1991–92	2	1ª Div. Nacional	3rd	
1992–93	2	1ª Div. Nacional	3rd	
1993–94	2	1ª Div. Nacional	1st	Promoted
1994–95	1	ASOBAL	12th	
1995–96	1	ASOBAL	6th	
1996–97	1	ASOBAL	2nd	
1997–98	1	ASOBAL	3rd / 1/2	
1998–99	1	ASOBAL	2nd / runners-up	
1999–00	1	ASOBAL	2nd / 1/2	
2000–01	1	ASOBAL	1st	Champion

Season	Tier	Division	Pos.	Notes
2001–02	1	ASOBAL	3rd	
2002–03	1	ASOBAL	3rd	
2003–04	1	ASOBAL	4th	
2004–05	1	ASOBAL	3rd	
2005–06	1	ASOBAL	5th	
2006–07	1	ASOBAL	3rd	
2007–08	1	ASOBAL	3rd	
2008–09	1	ASOBAL	5th	
2009–10	1	ASOBAL	4th	
2010–11	1	ASOBAL	3rd	
2011–12	1	ASOBAL	3rd	
2012–13	1	ASOBAL	4th	
2013–14	1	ASOBAL	5th	
2014–15	1	ASOBAL	7th	
2015–16	1	ASOBAL	3rd	
2016–17	1	ASOBAL	2nd	
2017–18	1	ASOBAL	2nd	
2018–19	1	ASOBAL	3rd	
2019–20	1	ASOBAL	2nd	
2020–21	1	ASOBAL	7th	
2021–22	1	ASOBAL	7th	
2022–23	1	ASOBAL	7th	
2023–24	1	ASOBAL	5th	
2024–25	1	ASOBAL	6th	

== Trophies ==
- Liga ASOBAL: 1
  - Winners: 2000–01.
  - Runners-up: 1996–97, 1998–99, 2016–17, 2017–18, 2019–20
- Copa del Rey: 1
  - Winners: 2001–02.
  - Runners-up: 2009–10, 2020–21.
- ASOBAL Cup: 2
  - Winners: 1998–99, 2008–09.
  - Runners-up: 1996–97, 1997–98, 2007–08, 2011–12, 2017–18, 2022–23.
- Supercopa ASOBAL
  - Runners-up: 2001–02, 2002–03, 2021–22.
- EHF Cup Winner's Cup: 2
  - Winners: 1998–99, 2004–05.
  - Runners-up: 2000–01, 2006–07.

== European record ==
=== Cup Winners' Cup ===
From the 2012–13 season, the men's competition was merged with the EHF Cup.

Season	Round	Club	Home	Away	Aggregate
1998–99; Winners	1/16	(Lithuania) Šiauliai Universitetas	39–19	32–12	71–31
1998–99; Winners	1/8	(Greece) Athinaikos H.C.	30–14	29–20	59–34
1998–99; Winners	1/4	(Turkey) Çankaya Belediyesi	33–16	27–26	60–42
1998–99; Winners	1/2	(North Macedonia) RK Vardar	35–20	29–27	64–47
1998–99; Winners	Finals	(Spain) Caja Cantabria Santander	32–23	19–20	51–43
2004–05; Winners	1/32	(Italy) Torggler Group Merano	35–19	38–28	73–47
2004–05; Winners	1/16	(Bosnia and Herzegovina) RK Bosna Sarajevo	43–28	42–33	85–61
2004–05; Winners	1/8	(Czech Republic) HC Baník Karviná	38–28	38–30	76–58
2004–05; Winners	1/4	(Germany) HSV Hamburg	25–27	29–25	54–52
2004–05; Winners	1/2	(Bosnia and Herzegovina) HRK Izviđač Ljubuški	37–30	38–33	75–63
2004–05; Winners	Finals	(Croatia) RK Zagreb	37–25	31–25	68–50

=== EHF ranking ===
As of 10/22/2026

Rank	Team	Points
115	(Norway) Drammen HK	38
116	(Poland) Wybrzeże Gdańsk	38
117	(Kosovo) KH Besa Famgas	38
118	(Spain) Ademar León	37
119	(Poland) Górnik Zabrze	37
120	(Slovenia) MRK Krka	36
121	(Azerbaijan) Kur	35

== Former club members ==
=== Notable former players ===
- (Spain) Julen Aguinagalde (2006-2009)
- (Spain) Garcia Alberto Aguirrezabalaga (2005-2006)
- (Spain) Mikel Aguirrezabalaga (2007–2011, 2014–2016)
- (Spain) Juan Francisco Alemany (1995–1997)
- (Spain) Vicente Álamo (2008–2009)
- (Spain) Victor Alonso (2013–2014)
- (Spain) Juan Andreu (2009–2012)
- (Spain) Rafael Baena (2011–2012)
- (Spain) Jon Belaustegui (2001–2003)
- (Spain) Ignacio Biosca (2014–2019)
- (Spain) Álvaro Cabanas (2008–2013)
- (Spain) José Luis Pérez Canca (1996–2000)
- (Spain) Manuel Colón (1995–2006)
- (Spain) Alejandro Costoya (2016–2018)
- (Spain) Alberto Entrerríos (1998–2001)
- (Spain) Raúl Entrerríos (2001–2007)
- (Spain) David Fernández Alonso (2016–2020, 2022–)
- (Spain) Jaime Fernández Fernández (2014–2022)
- (Spain) Álvaro Ferrer (2011–2012)
- (Spain) Aleix Franch (1995–1996)
- (Spain) Rubén Garabaya (1997–1999)
- (Spain) Juanín García (1997–2005, 2015–2019)
- (Spain) Mateo Garralda (2006–2008)
- (Spain) Iosu Goñi Leoz (2009–2013)
- (Spain) Fernando Hernández (1996–2000)
- (Spain) José Javier Hombrados (1996–2000)
- (Spain) Yeray Lamariano (2001–2007, 2015)
- (Spain) Demetrio Lozano (1995–1998)
- (Spain) Iñaki Malumbres (2012–2013)
- (Spain) Rubén Marchán (2019-2021)
- (Spain) Ángel Montoro (2008–2012)
- (Spain) Viran Morros (2004–2007)
- (Spain) Iñaki Ordoñez (2000–2001)
- (Spain) Javier Ortigosa (2008–2012)
- (Spain) Juan José Panadero (1997–1999)
- (Spain) Roberto García Parrondo (2003–2006)
- (Spain) David Pisonero (1997–1998)
- (Spain) Xavier Pascual Fuertes (1994–1995)
- (Spain) Gonzalo Pérez Arce (2017–2022)
- (Spain) Juan Pérez (1993-1994, 1998-2002)
- (Spain) Antonio García Robledo (2011–2012)
- (Spain) Iker Romero (2000–2001)
- (Spain) Carlos Ruesga (2010–2013)
- (Spain) Daniel Sarmiento (2007–2009)
- (Spain) Santi Urdiales (2006–2008)
- (Algeria) Belgacem Filah (2004)
- (Algeria) Khalifa Ghedbane (2020–2021)
- (Argentina) Gonzalo Carou (2008-2014, 2015-2020)
- (Argentina) Eric Gull (2000–2001)
- (Argentina) Pedro Martínez Cami (2019–2021)
- (Argentina) Sebastián Simonet (2016-2019)
- (Argentina) Federico Matías Vieyra (2013–2020)
- (Austria) Roland Schlinger (2006–2007)
- (Bosnia and Herzegovina) Nikola Prce (2009–2010)
- (Bosnia and Herzegovina) (Qatar) Danijel Šarić (2006–2008)
- (Bosnia and Herzegovina) Vladimir Vranješ (2012–2013)
- (Bosnia and Herzegovina) Faruk Vražalić (2012–2013)
- (Belarus) Dzmitry Patotski (2018–2020)
- (Brazil) Felipe Borges (2011–2013)
- (Brazil) Leonardo Domenech de Almeida (2013–2015)
- (Brazil) Raul Nantes (2009–2012)
- (Brazil) João Pedro Silva (2014–2015)
- (Brazil) Leonardo Santos (2015–2017)
- (Chile) Erwin Feuchtmann (2019–2021)
- (Cape Verde) Leandro Semedo (2020-2022)
- (Croatia) Mirko Alilović (2005-2010)
- (Croatia) Matej Ašanin (2012-2014)
- (Croatia) Damir Bičanić (2008-2010)
- (Croatia) Denis Buntić (2008-2011)
- (Croatia) Igor Kos (2008-2009)
- (Croatia) Venio Losert (2010–2012)
- (Croatia) Tin Lučin (2019–2021)
- (Croatia) Petar Metličić (2002-2005)
- (Croatia) Mirza Šarić (1999-2000)
- (Croatia) Dino Slavić (2018-2021)
- (Croatia) Tonči Valčić (2007-2008)
- (Denmark) Kasper Hvidt (2000-2004)
- (Denmark) Claus Møller Jakobsen (2006-2008)
- (France) Adrien Dipanda (2011–2012)
- (Hungary) Csaba Bartók (2000–2002)
- (Hungary) Imre Bíró (1993–1995)
- (Hungary) (Cuba) Ivo Díaz (2005–2006)
- (Hungary) Balázs Laluska (2005–2008)
- (Hungary) Patrik Ligetvári (2018–2019)
- (Iran) Saeid Barkhordari (2022–)
- (Iceland) Sigfús Sigurðsson (2006–2008)
- (South Korea) Kim Jin-Young (2021–)
- (Lithuania) Aidenas Malašinskas (2022)
- (Lithuania) Zanas Virbauskas (2021–)
- (North Macedonia) Darko Dimitrievski (2014–2015)
- (Montenegro) (Serbia) Radivoje Ristanović (2009)
- (Norway) Ole Erevik (2004–2005)
- (Norway) Kristian Kjelling (2002–2006)
- (Norway) Thomas Kristensen (2014–2015)
- (Norway) Stian Vatne (2002–2005)
- (Poland) Mateusz Piechowski (2020–2021)
- (Portugal) Ricardo Costa (2006–2011)
- (Russia) Denis Krivochlykov (2000–2012)
- (Russia) Alexander Tatarintsev (2012–2014)
- (Serbia) Mladen Bojinović (1999–2000)
- (Serbia) Milan Bomaštar (2021–2022)
- (Serbia) Vladimir Cupara (2015–2018)
- (Serbia) Marko Ćuruvija (2003–2006)
- (Serbia) Dalibor Čutura (2010–2012)
- (Serbia) Slobodan Kuzmanovski (1996–1997)
- (Serbia) Đorđe Golubović (2012–2013)
- (Serbia) Marko Milosavljević (2021–)
- (Serbia) Ivan Mošić (2018–2020)
- (Serbia) Živan Pešić (2017–2019)
- (Serbia) Dragan Škrbić (1995–1997)
- (Serbia) Predrag Vejin (2013–2015, 2017–2018)
- (Slovenia) Uroš Zorman (2003–2004)
- (Switzerland) Carlos Lima (2000–2001)
- (Slovakia) Stanislav Demovič (1998-2001)
- (Slovakia) Martin Straňovský (2005–2012)
- (Sweden) Magnus Andersson (2001)
- (Sweden) Dalibor Doder (2009–2010)
- (Sweden) Staffan Olsson (2004)
- (United States) Andrew Donlin (2019–2021)

=== Former coaches ===
Seasons	Coach	Country
1995	Isidoro Martínez	(Spain)
1995–2007	Manolo Cadenas	(Spain)
2007–2011	Jordi Ribera	(Spain)
2011–2012	Isidoro Martínez	(Spain)
2012–2013	Manolo Cadenas	(Spain)
2013–2015	Dani Gordo	(Spain)
2015–2019	Rafael Guijosa	(Spain)
2019	Diego Dorado	(Spain)
2019–	Manolo Cadenas	(Spain)
