= Saeid Barkhordari =

Iranian handball player (born 1989)

Personal information
- Nationality: Iranian
- Born: 7 May 1989 (age 37) Esfahan
- Height: 1.90 m (6 ft 3 in)

Sport
- Sport: Handball
- Position: Goalkeeper
- Current club: Club Balonmano Ademar León
- Number: 1

Senior clubs
- Years: Team
- –: Foolad Mobarakeh Sepahan
National team
Years	Team	Apps	(Gls)
11	Iran	112	(0)

Saeid Barkhordari (Persian: سعید برخورداری, born 7 May 1989) is an Iranian handball player for Club Balonmano Ademar León and the Iranian national team.
