= 2014 Copa ASOBAL =

XXV Copa ASOBAL 2014

Tournament details
- Venue: Palacio de los Deportes (in León host cities)
- Dates: 20 – 21 December
- Teams: 4

Final positions
- Champions: FC Barcelona (10th title)
- Runners-up: Fraikin Ganollers

Tournament statistics
- Matches played: 3
- Goals scored: 180 (60 per match)
- Attendance: 11,000 (3,667 per match)
- Top scorer: Siarhei Rutenka 15

Awards
- Best player: Nikola Karabatić

The 2014 Copa ASOBAL was the 25th edition of the Copa ASOBAL. It was held at the Palacio de los Deportes in León, Castile and León, on 20 & 21 December 2014. The tournament was hosted by ABANCA Ademar León in collaboration with the León city council, making it the fifth time León hosts Copa ASOBAL.

FC Barcelona won its tenth title after defeating Fraikin Granollers 37–26 in the Final.

== Qualified teams ==
Qualified teams for this edition are the top three teams on standings at midseason (matchday 15) plus the host team (Ademar León).

| # | Team | P | W | D | L | G+ | G− | Dif | Pts |
|---|---|---|---|---|---|---|---|---|---|
| 1 | FC Barcelona | 15 | 15 | 0 | 0 | 579 | 398 | 181 | 30 |
| 2 | Naturhouse La Rioja | 15 | 13 | 0 | 2 | 477 | 400 | 77 | 26 |
| 3 | Fraikin Granollers | 15 | 11 | 1 | 3 | 410 | 386 | 24 | 23 |
| 7 | ABANCA Ademar León | 15 | 6 | 3 | 6 | 446 | 457 | −11 | 15 |

== Venue ==
León
Palacio de los Deportes
Capacity: 5,188
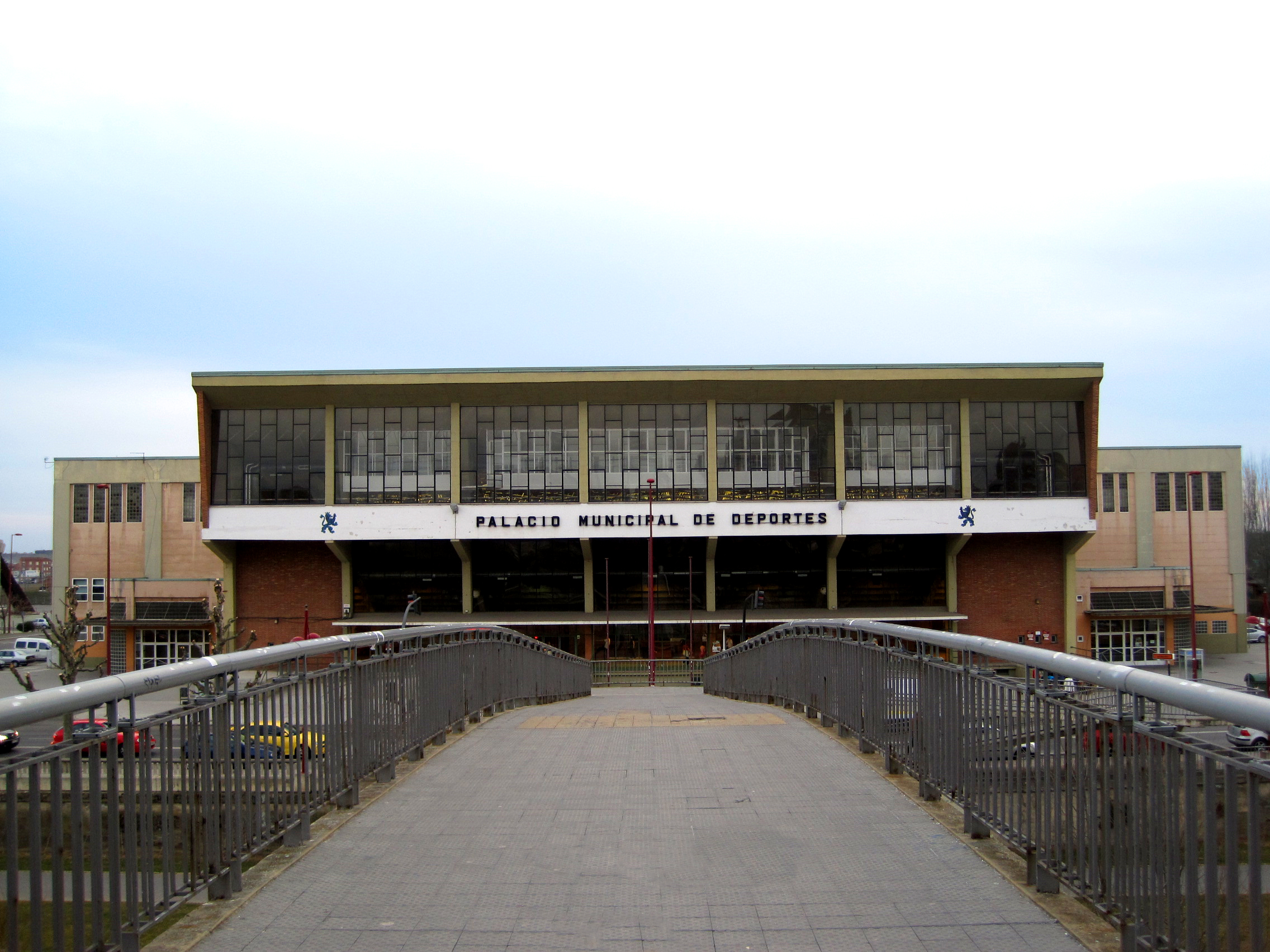

== Matches ==
Semifinals
1 | FC Barcelona | 35
2 | Naturhouse La Rioja | 25
7 | ABANCA Ademar León | 27
3 | Fraikin Granollers | 30

Final
1 | FC Barcelona | 37
3 | Fraikin Granollers | 26

=== Semifinals ===
| 20 December; 18:00 (UTC+1) | ABANCA Ademar León | 27–30 | Fraikin Granollers | Palacio de los Deportes, León; Attendance: 4,000; Referees: Raluy López, Sabroso Ramírez |
| 20 December; 18:00 (UTC+1) | Piñeiro 7 | (14–16) | del Arco, A Ruiz 6 | Palacio de los Deportes, León; Attendance: 4,000; Referees: Raluy López, Sabroso Ramírez |
| 20 December; 18:00 (UTC+1) | 3× (yellow card) 4× (suspension) | Report | 3× (yellow card) 5× (suspension) | Palacio de los Deportes, León; Attendance: 4,000; Referees: Raluy López, Sabroso Ramírez |

| 20 December; 20:00 (UTC+1) | FC Barcelona | 35–25 | Naturhouse La Rioja | Palacio de los Deportes, León; Attendance: 3,500; Referees: Fernández Fernández, Martín Franco |
| 20 December; 20:00 (UTC+1) | Rutenka 8 | (19–12) | A Fernández 9 | Palacio de los Deportes, León; Attendance: 3,500; Referees: Fernández Fernández, Martín Franco |
| 20 December; 20:00 (UTC+1) | 2× (yellow card) 2× (suspension) | Report | 2× (yellow card) 5× (suspension) | Palacio de los Deportes, León; Attendance: 3,500; Referees: Fernández Fernández, Martín Franco |

=== Final ===
| 21 December; 17:00 (UTC+1) | FC Barcelona | 37–26 | Fraikin Granollers | Palacio de los Deportes, León; Attendance: 3,500; Referees: Álvarez Mata, Bustamante López |
| 21 December; 17:00 (UTC+1) | Rutenka, Karabatić 7 | (17–13) | Solé 8 | Palacio de los Deportes, León; Attendance: 3,500; Referees: Álvarez Mata, Bustamante López |
| 21 December; 17:00 (UTC+1) | 3× (yellow card) 2× (suspension) | Report | 3× (yellow card) 2× (suspension) | Palacio de los Deportes, León; Attendance: 3,500; Referees: Álvarez Mata, Bustamante López |

2014 Copa ASOBAL winners
(Catalonia)
FC Barcelona
Tenth title

== TV coverage ==
The tournament was broadcast in Catalonia in Esport3 and nationwide at Spain in Sportmanía and Canal+ Deportes 2 HD. Also worldwide via LAOLA1.tv

== Top goalscorers ==
| Player | Team | Goals |
|---|---|---|
| (Belarus) Siarhei Rutenka | FC Barcelona | 15 |
| (Spain) Ferran Solé | Fraikin Granollers | 11 |
| (Spain) Juan Del Arco | Fraikin Granollers | 11 |
| (France) Nikola Karabatić | FC Barcelona | 10 |
| (North Macedonia) Kiril Lazarov | FC Barcelona | 10 |
| (Spain) Ángel Fernández | Naturhouse La Rioja | 9 |
| (Brazil) Guilherme Valadão | Fraikin Granollers | 9 |
| (Spain) David Resina | Fraikin Granollers | 8 |
| (Spain) Álvaro Ruiz | Fraikin Granollers | 8 |

== See also ==
- Liga ASOBAL 2014–15
- Copa del Rey de Balonmano 2014–15
