= Magnus Andersson (handballer) =

Swedish handball player and manager (born 1966)

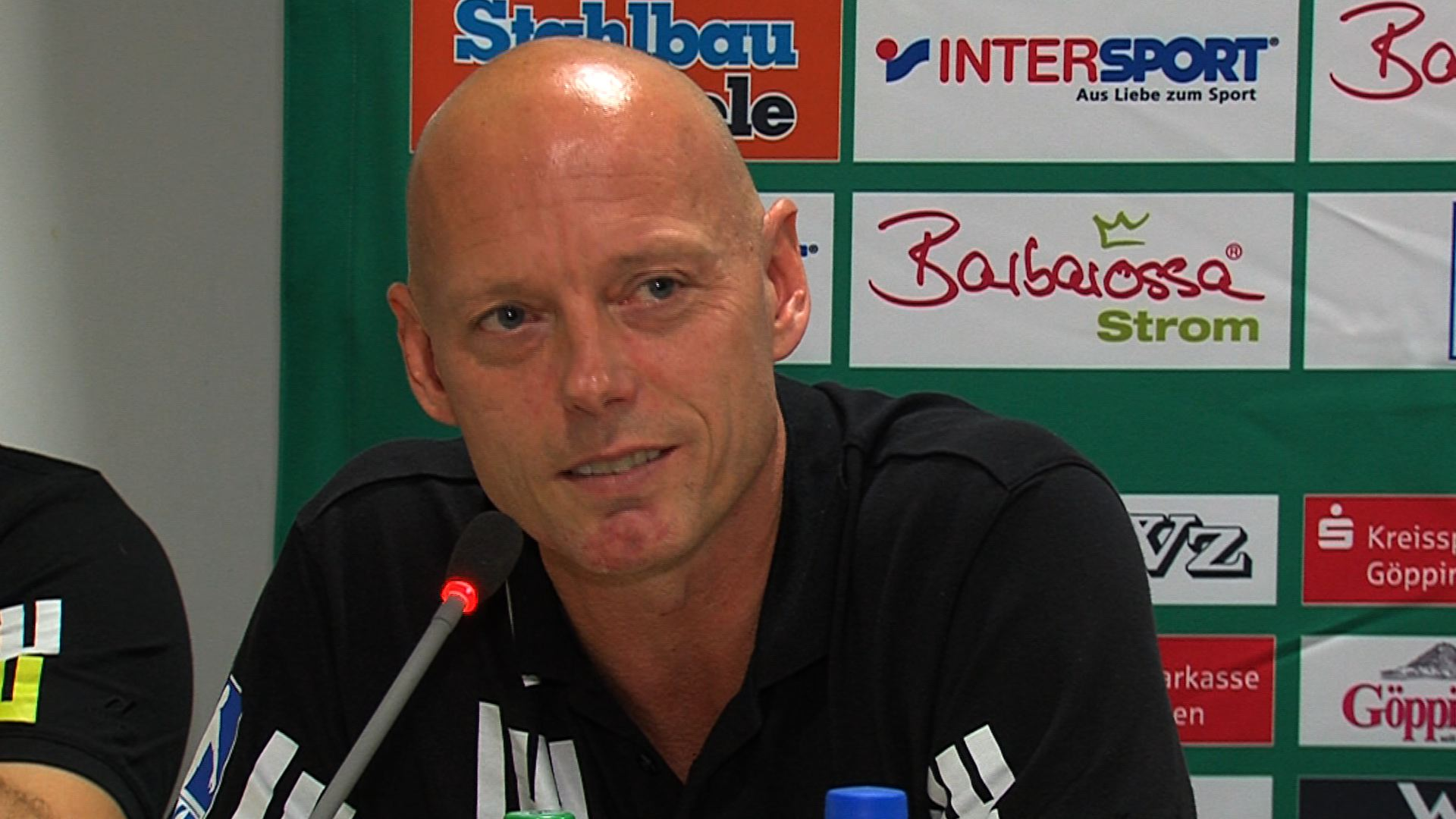
- Andersson in 2014

Personal information
- Nationality: Swedish
- Born: 17 May 1966 (age 60) Linköping, Sweden
- Height: 1.80 m (5 ft 11 in)

Sport
- Sport: Handball
- Position: Centre back

Youth career
- Years: Team
- –: Risbrinkspojkarna IF

Senior clubs
- Years: Team
- 1985–1987: IF Saab
- 1987–1991: HK Drott
- 1991–1992: Viking HK
- 1992–1993: TuS Schutterwald
- 1993–1995: HK Drott
- 1995–1997: TuS Schutterwald
- 1997–1998: GWD Minden
- 1998–2003: HK Drott
- 2001: → CB Ademar León
- 2003: HSG Nordhorn
National team
Years	Team	Apps	(Gls)
1988–2003	Sweden	307	(919)

Teams managed
- 2001–2005: HK Drott
- 2005–2010: FC København
- 2010–2011: Austria
- 2011–2012: AG København (Sporting director)
- 2012–2014: HK Malmö
- 2014–2017: Frisch Auf Göppingen
- 2018–2023: FC Porto
- 2024–2026: FC Porto
- 2026–: Norway (men)
Medal record
Olympic Games
Silver medal – second place	1992 Barcelona	Team
Silver medal – second place	1996 Atlanta	Team
Silver medal – second place	2000 Sydney	Team
World Championship
Gold medal – first place	1990 Czechoslovakia
Gold medal – first place	1999 Egypt
Silver medal – second place	1997 Japan
Silver medal – second place	2001 France
Bronze medal – third place	1993 Sweden
Bronze medal – third place	1995 Iceland
European Championship
Gold medal – first place	1994 Portugal
Gold medal – first place	1998 Italy
Gold medal – first place	2000 Croatia
Gold medal – first place	2002 Sweden

Per Magnus Andersson (born 17 May 1966) is a Swedish handball manager and former player. He was voted as the best Swedish handballer on four occasions and won both the World Championship and European Championship with the Swedish national team.

== Career ==
Magnus Andersson started his career at IF Saab, but got his first real breakthrough at HK Drott.

In 1991 he joined Norwegian club Stavanger Håndball, followed by German club TuS Schutterwald in 1992. He then returned to HK Drott for two years, before rejoining TuS Schutterwald.

In 1997 he joined GWD Minden for a single season, before returning to HK Drott for a third time. With HK Drott he won the Swedish Championship 6 times.

In 2001 he was loaned out to CB Ademar León, where he won the Spanish Championship.

In late 2003 he made a short comeback for HSG Nordhorn, where he played 3 games.

== National team ==
Andersson was also a key player for the Swedish National Team during the golden generation known as the "Bengan Boys", where he played 307 national team matches between 1988 and 2003.

At the 1990 World Championship he won gold medals with Sweden. He won his second World Championship at the 1999 World Championship.

In 1992, he was a member of the Swedish handball team that won the silver medal in the Olympic tournament, playing all seven matches and scoring 18 goals. Four years later, he was part of the Swedish team which won the silver medal again, playing six matches and scoring 16 goals. At the 2000 Games, he won his third silver medal with the Swedish team, playing all eight matches and scoring ten goals.

In 1994 he was part of the Swedish team that won the inaugural 1994 European Championship, which he followed up with gold medals in 1998, 2000 and 2002.

== Coaching career ==
In 2001 he started his coaching career as the player-coach of HK Drott, replacing Ulf Sivertsson. In 2003 he became a coach full time.

In 2005 he became the head coach the Danish club FCK Håndbold. Here he won the Danish Championship in 2007-08 and the Danish Cup in 2010.

Following the club's fusion with AG Håndbold in 2010, he left the club and became the head coach of the Austrian men's handball team. Only a year later he left the position after failing to qualify for the 2012 European Championship. and joined AG København as the sporting director.

Following the club's bankruptcy after the 2011-12 season he was released of his contract.

He then coached the Swedish clubs Hästö IF and HK Malmö, followed by German Bundesligateam Frisch Auf Göppingen in 2014. Here he won the EHF Cup in 2016 and in 2017. He left the team in September 2017.

In 2018 he became the head coach of Portuguese top team FC Porto. Here he won the Portuguese Championship four times and the Portuguese Handball Cup twice, as well as winning bronze medals in the 2018-19 EHF Cup. In the 2022-23 season he was named 'Coach of the Season' in Portugal. The following summer, in July 2023 he was replaced by Carlos Resende, one year before his contract expired.

For the 2024-25 season he returned to be the head coach of FC Porto.

== Titles ==
=== As player ===
- Swedish Championship
  - Winner: 1988, 1990, 1991, 1994, 1999, 2002
- Spanish Championship
  - Winner: 2001

=== As Coach ===
- EHF Cup
  - Winner: 2016, 2017
  - Bronze medals: 2019
- Danish Championship
  - Winner: 2010
- Danish Cup
  - Winner: 2010
- Portuguese Championship
  - Winner: 2019, 2021, 2022, 2023
- Portuguese Cup
  - Winner: 2019, 2021
