= Juanín García =

Spanish handball player (born 1977)

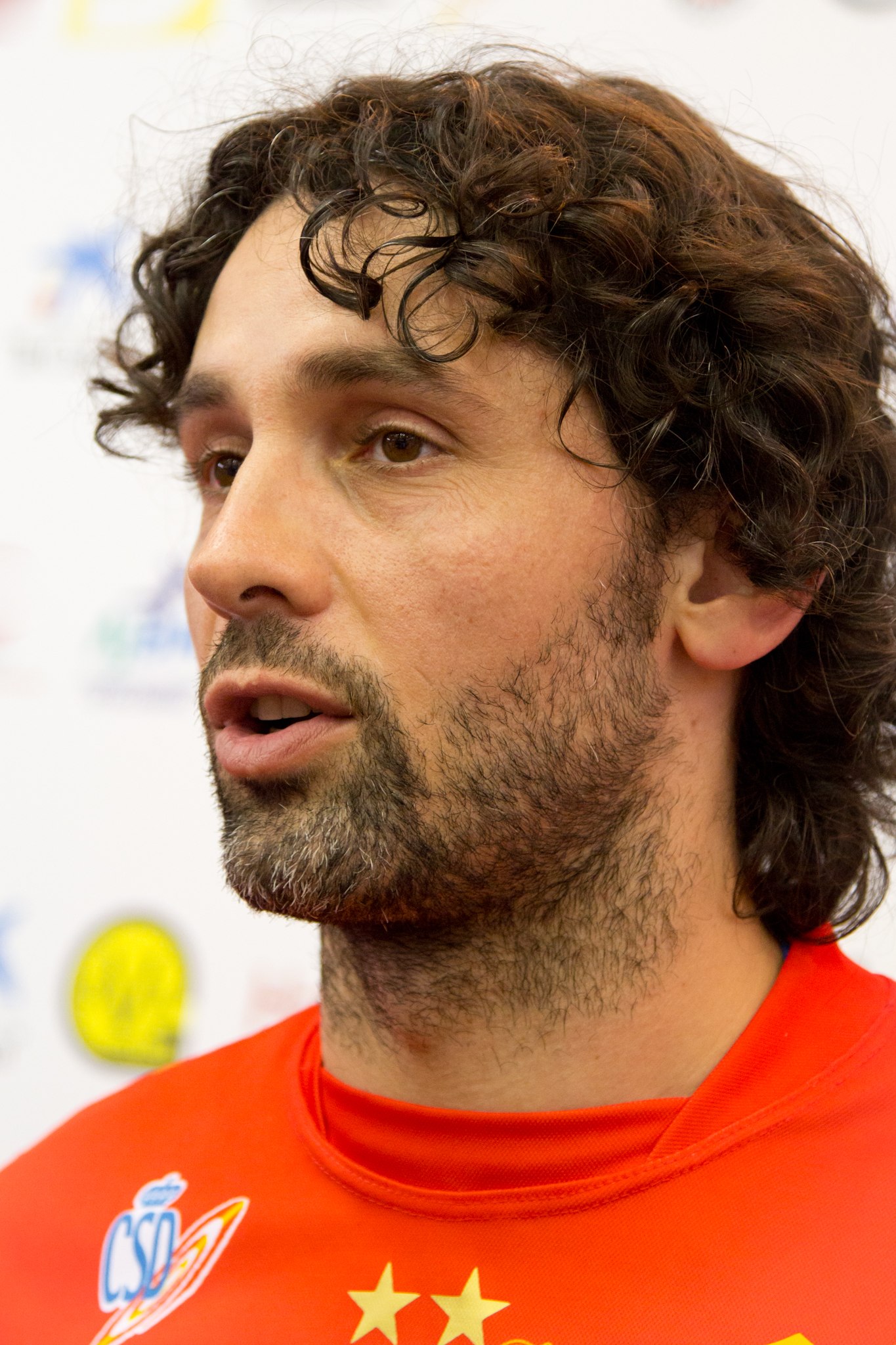
- García in June 2013

Personal information
- Full name: Juan Antonio García Lorenzana
- Born: 28 August 1977 (age 49) León, Spain
- Height: 1.76 m (5 ft 9 in)

Sport
- Sport: Handball
- Position: Left Wing
- Current club: CB Ademar León

Senior clubs
- Years: Team
- 1997–2005: Ademar León
- 2005–2014: FC Barcelona
- 2014–2015: Naturhouse La Rioja
- 2015–2019: Ademar León
National team
Years	Team	Apps	(Gls)
1997–2019	Spain	206	(822)
Medal record
Olympic Games
Bronze medal – third place	2008 Beijing	Team competition
World Championship
Gold medal – first place	2005 Tunisia	Team competition
Bronze medal – third place	2011 Sweden	Team competition
European Championship
Silver medal – second place	2006 Switzerland	Team competition
Mediterranean Games
Gold medal – first place	2005 Almería	Team competition

Juan Antonio "Juanín" García Lorenzana better known as Juanín García (born 28 August 1977) is a Spanish former handball player. He retired in 2019 after playing for CB Ademar León. He is the all time top scorer in the Spanish Liga ASOBAL with 2684 goals. He also has the second most matches in the league (628) behind José Javier Hombrados, and the most for any outfield player. With 822 goals he is also the all time top scorer on the Spanish national team.

He was included in the 2004 World team of the year as the left wing.

== Career ==
García's senior debut came for Ademar León. Here, he won the 2000-01 Spanish championship, the 2001-02 Copa del Rey, the 1998/99 Copa ASOBAL and the 1998-99 and 2004-05 EHF Cup Winners' Cup. Eventually, he became the captain of the club.

In 2015, he joined league rivals FC Barcelona where he played for 9 years. Here he won the league in 2005-06, 2010-11, 2011-12, and 2013-14. He also won the 2006-07 and 2013-14 Copa Asobal, the 2013-14 Spanish Supercup and the 2010-11 EHF Champions League. In 2009/2010, he scored 13 goals in the final four, which is a record.Pazen, Björn (26 December 2020). "Trophies and tears, goals and galas". European Handball Federation. It was, however, not enough to win as Kiel beat them 36:34.

In 2014, he left Barcelona to join Naturhouse La Rioja. A year later, he returned to his original club, Ademar León. He retired after the 2018-19 season, at the age of 40 and became a youth coach at the club.

=== National team ===
García became world Champion with the Spanish team at the 2005 World Championship in Tunisia. The same year, he won the 2005 Mediterranean Games. At the 2006 European Championship, he won silver medals.

At the 2007 World Championship, he and the Spanish team was knocked out in the quarterfinal by Germany, and finished 7th.

He participated at the 2008 Summer Olympics in Beijing, where The team won a bronze medal, defeating Croatia in the third place playoff. Juanín García was the top scorer of the tournament.

At the 2011 World Championship, he won bronze medals.

In a decision that would create much debate, Valero Rivera López, the Spanish head coach, decided to leave him of the selection for the 2012 Olympics.

== Titles ==
=== Club ===
==== FC Barcelona ====
- 5 Liga ASOBAL 2005-2006, 2010-11, 2011-12, 2012-13, 2013-14.
- 4 Copa del Rey 2006-2007, 2008-09, 2009-10, 2013-14
- 5 Supercopa ASOBAL 2006-07, 2008-09, 2009-10, 2012-13, 2013-14
- 5 Copa ASOBAL 2005-06, 2009-10, 2011-12), 2012-13, 2013-14
- 1 EHF Champions League 2010-11
- 5 Pyrenean handball league 2005-06, 2006-07, 2007-08, 2009-10, 2010-11
- 2 Supercopa de Catalunya 2012, 2013
- 1 IHF Super Globe 2013

==== Ademar de León ====
- 2 EHF Cup Winners' Cup 1998-99, 2004-05
- 1 Liga ASOBAL 2000-01
- 1 Copa del Rey 2001-02
- 1 Copa ASOBAL 1998-99
