= José Javier Hombrados =

Spanish handball player (born 1972)

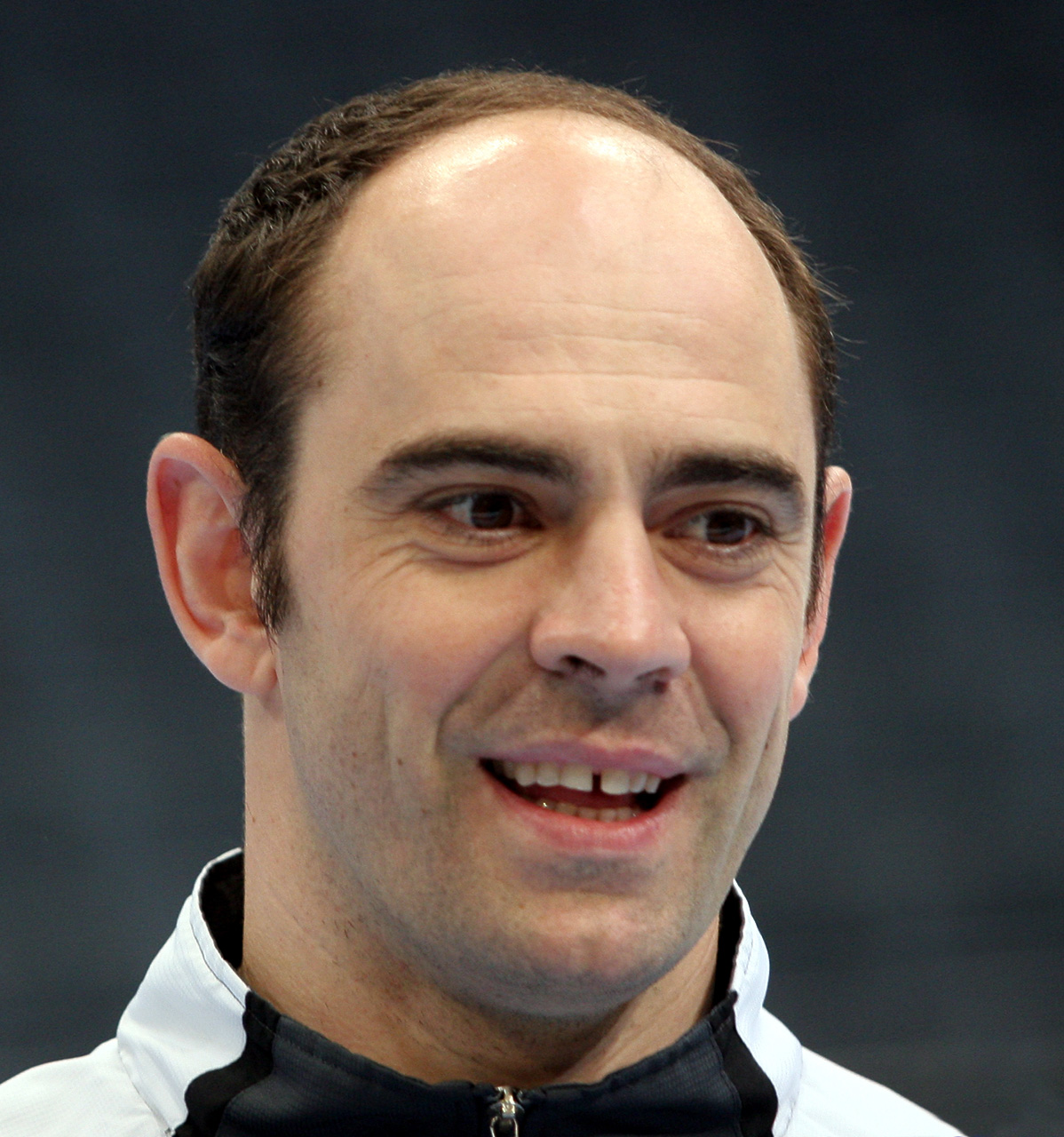
- Hombrados in 2008

Personal information
- Full name: José Javier Hombrados Ibáñez
- Nationality: Spanish
- Born: 7 April 1972 (age 54) Madrid, Spain
- Height: 1.97 m (6 ft 6 in)

Sport
- Sport: Handball
- Position: Goalkeeper
- Number: 43

Senior clubs
- Years: Team
- –1990: BM SAFA
- 1990–1993: Atlético Madrid
- 1993–1995: Teka
- 1995–1996: Teucro
- 1996–2000: Ademar León
- 2000–2002: Portland San Antonio
- 2002–2011: Ciudad Real
- 2011–2013: Atlético Madrid
- 2013–2015: HSG Wetzlar
- 2015–2021: BM Guadalajara
National team
Years	Team	Apps	(Gls)
1997–	Spain	241	(1)
Medal record
Men's handball
Representing Spain
Olympic Games
Bronze medal – third place	1996 Atlanta	Team
Bronze medal – third place	2008 Beijing	Team
World Championship
Gold medal – first place	2005 Tunisia	Team
Bronze medal – third place	2011 Sweden	Team
European Championship
Silver medal – second place	1996 Spain	Team
Silver medal – second place	2006 Switzerland	Team
Mediterranean Games
Bronze medal – third place	1997 Bari	Team
Goodwill Games
Bronze medal – third place	1994 St. Petersburg	Team

José Javier Hombrados Ibáñez (Note: In this Spanish name, the first or paternal surname is Hombrados and the second or maternal family name is Ibáñez.) (born 7 April 1972) is a Spanish former handball player for Spain national team.

He has the record for most appearances in the Spanish top division, Liga ASOBAL and the only player with more than 700 appeances. He is the only goalkeeper to have won the EHF Champions League with three different clubs.

== Career ==
Hombrados began playing handball at BM Safa in Barcelona. His first league game was for Atlético Madrid. In 1991, he reached the final of the Cope del Rey.

In 1993, he joined Teka. Here he won the Spanish Championship in 1994 and the EHF Champions League and Copa del Rey in 1995. He then played for a short while for SD Teucro before joining Ademar León. Here, he won the Copa ASOBAL and the EHF Cup Winners' Cup.

In 2000, he joined SDC San Antonio where he won the 2000-01 EHF Champions League, the IHF Super Globe and the Copa del Rey in his first season and the Spanish league in his second.

He then joined BM Ciudad Real where he played until 2013, the last two of which under the Atlético Madrid license. In 2013 he played for the Qatari club Qatari Al Sadd at the 2013 IHF Super Globe.

After Qatar, he signed for German club HSG Wetzlar.

In 2015, he joined BM Guadalajara. He retired after the 2020-21 season at the age of 49, after 29 seasons and 770 games.

During his career, Hombrados' shirt number was equivalent to his age at the start of that particular season.

== Trophies ==
- Liga ASOBAL: 4
  - 1994, 2002, 2004 and 2007
- EHF Champions League: 4
  - 1994, 2001, 2006 and 2008
- EHF Cup Winner's Cup: 2
  - 1999 and 2003
- Copa del Rey: 4
  - 1996, 2002, 2003 and 2008
- Copa ASOBAL: 6
  - 1998, 1999, 2004, 2005, 2006 and 2007
- Handball World Championship: 1
  - 2005
- Handball European Championship: 1
  - 1996
- European Super Cup: 3
  - 2001, 2006 and 2007
- Spanish Super Cup: 2
  - 2005 and 2008
