= Jon Belaustegui =

Spanish handball player (born 1979)

Personal information
- Full name: Jon Belaustegui Ruano
- Born: 19 March 1979 (age 47) San Sebastián, Guipúzcoa, Spain
- Height: 195 cm (6 ft 5 in)
- Weight: 100 kg (220 lb)
Medal record
Men's Handball
Representing Spain
Olympic Games
Bronze medal – third place	2008 Beijing	Team
Mediterranean Games
Gold medal – first place	2005 Almería	Team

Jon Belaustegui Ruano (Note: In this Spanish name, the first or paternal surname is Belaustegui and the second or maternal family name is Ruano.) (born 19 March 1979 in San Sebastián, Guipúzcoa) is a Spanish handball player.

He participated at the 2008 summer Olympics in Beijing as a member of the Spain men's national handball team. The team won a bronze medal, defeating Croatia.
