= Ivan Mošić =

Serbian handball player (born 1994)

Personal information
- Nationality: Serbian
- Born: 23 December 1994 (age 31) Kragujevac, Serbia, FR Yugoslavia
- Height: 1.94 m (6 ft 4 in)

Sport
- Sport: Handball
- Position: Left back
- Current club: HC Ramat HaSharon
- Number: 20

Senior clubs
- Years: Team
- –: RK Radnički Kragujevac
- –2018: RK Crvena zvezda
- 2018: → Shabab Al Ahli (loan)
- 2018–2020: Abanca Ademar León
- 2020–2021: Riihimäen Cocks
- 2021–2023: HC Ramat HaSharon
- 2023–: HC Buzău
National team
Years	Team	Apps	(Gls)
–	Serbia	24	(33)

Ivan Mošić (born 23 December 1994) is a Serbian handball player for HC Ramat HaSharon and the Serbian national team.

He represented Serbia at the 2019 World Men's Handball Championship.
