= Valdevimbre =

Coordinates: 42°25′N 5°37′W

- municipality
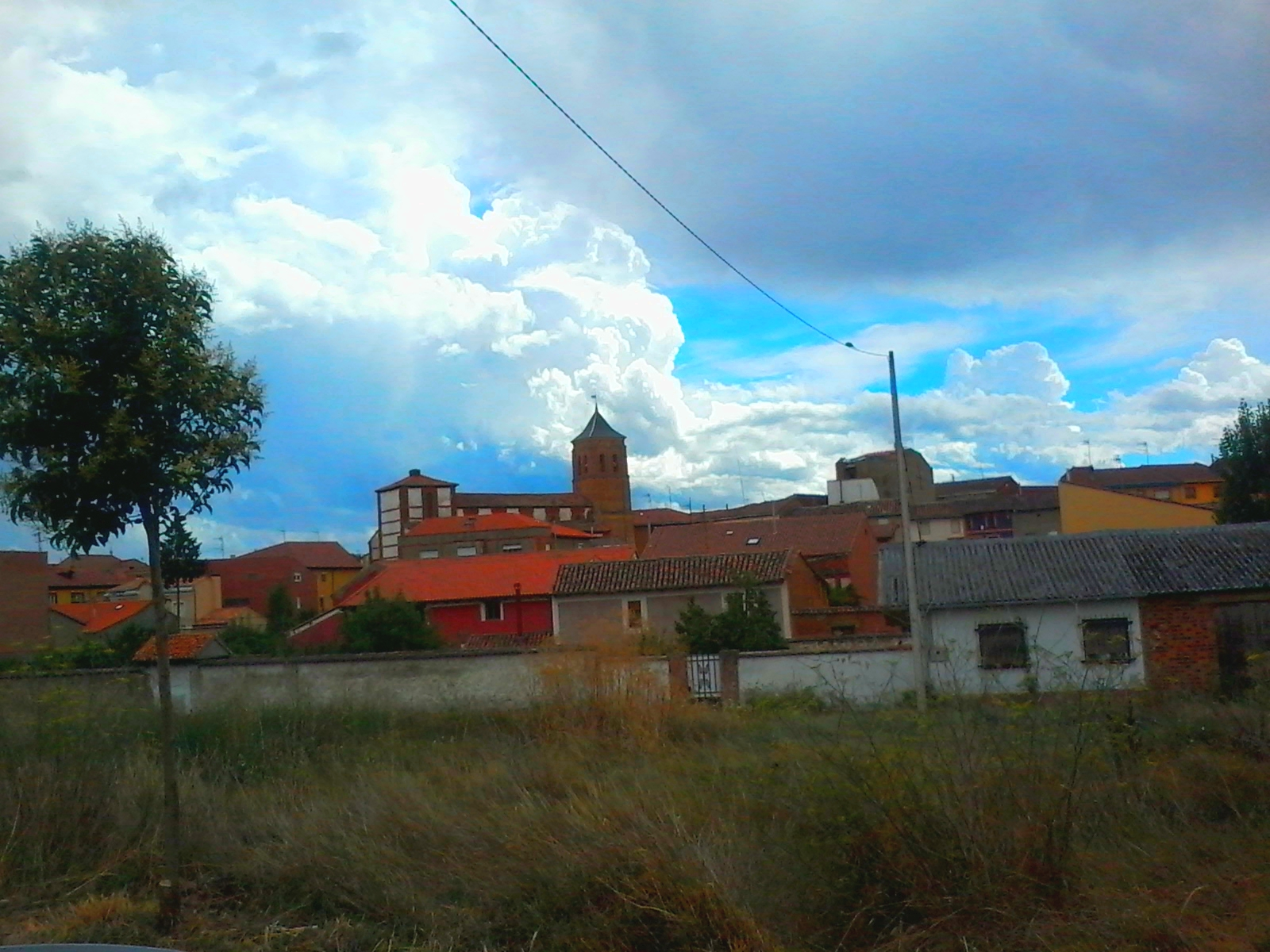
- Panoramic View of Valdevimbre.

- Flag Coat of arms
- Interactive map of Valdevimbre
- Country: Spain
- Autonomous community: Castile and León
- Province: León
- Municipality: Valdevimbre

Area
  - Total: 67 km^{2} (26 sq mi)

Population (2025-01-01)
  - Total: 892
  - Density: 13/km^{2} (34/sq mi)
- Time zone: UTC+1 (CET)
  - Summer (DST): UTC+2 (CEST)

Valdevimbre (Spanish pronunciation: [baldeˈβimbɾe]) is a municipality located in the province of León, Castile and León, Spain. According to the 2004 census (INE), the municipality had a population of 1,110 inhabitants.
