= Kasper Hvidt =

Danish handball player (born 1976)

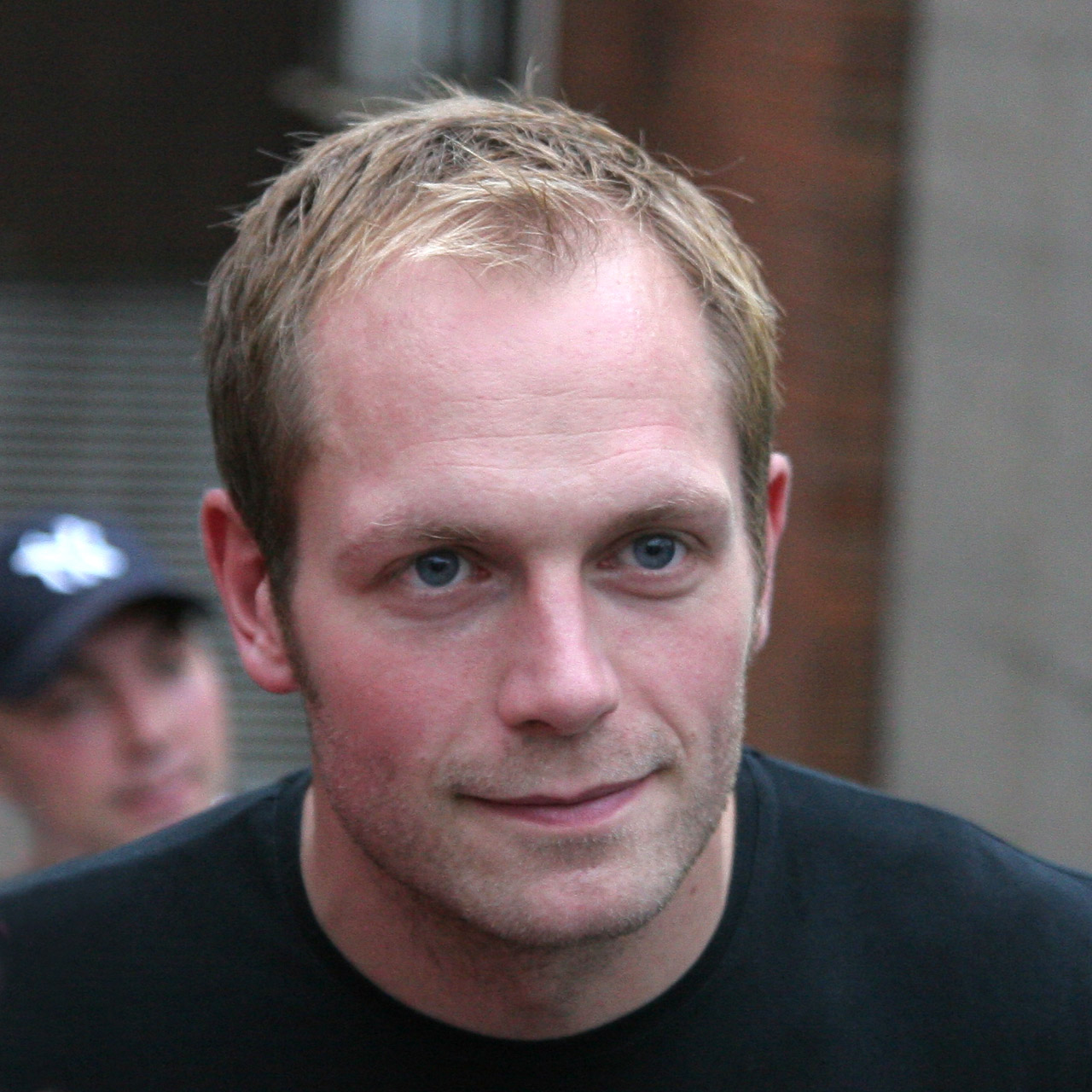

Personal information
- Full name: Kasper Hvidt
- Nationality: Danish
- Born: 6 February 1976 (age 50) Copenhagen, Denmark
- Height: 1.93 m (6 ft 4 in)

Sport
- Sport: Handball
- Position: Goalkeeper

Senior clubs
- Years: Team
- 1996-1997: Ajax København
- 1997-1998: CB Cangas
- 1998-2000: TBV Lemgo
- 2000-2004: CB Ademar León
- 2004-2007: Portland San Antonio
- 2007-2009: FC Barcelona
- 2009-2010: FCK Håndbold
- 2010-2012: AG København
- 2012-2017: KIF Kolding København
National team
Years	Team	Apps	(Gls)
1996-2010	Denmark	219	(1)
Medal record
Men's Handball
Representing Denmark
World Championships
Bronze medal – third place	2007 Germany	Team
European Championships
Gold medal – first place	2008 Norway	Team
Bronze medal – third place	2006 Switzerland	Team
Bronze medal – third place	2004 Slovenia	Team
Bronze medal – third place	2002 Sweden	Team
Junior World Championship
Gold medal – first place	1997 Turkey	Team
Junior European Championship
Gold medal – first place	1996 Romania

Kasper Hvidt (born 6 February 1976) is a Danish retired handball goalkeeper, who last played for KIF Kolding and previous Danish national team. He was selected as the best keeper for the 2008 European Men's Handball Championship, where he also won Gold medals with the Danish national team. From 2004 to 2010 he was the captain of the Danish national team.

== Playing career ==
Kasper Hvidt started his career at the Copenhagen based clubs BK Ydun and Frederiksberg IF. In 1997/1998 he played a season at Ajax København, before moving to Spanish club CB Cangas, where he played for a season. He then joined German side TBV Lemgo. After another year he moved to Ademar León in Spain where he would play for 5 years. In this period he won both the Spanish ASOBAL League and the Copa del Rey de Balonmano. In 2001 he was named Danish handballer of the year.

From 2004 to 2007 he played for Portland San Antonio where he once again won the Spanish league.

His last stop before returning to Denmark was FC Barcelona Handbol where he played from 2007 to 2009. After Barcelona he considered retiring, but was convinved by an offer from the newly founded team AG København. He did however choose to retire from the Danish national team. In the 2020-11 Danish Championship Final against Bjerringbro-Silkeborg Håndbold he got an early red card, but AG København nevertheless managed to win the tournament. When AG København went bankrupt, and thus fused with KIF Kolding to become KIF Kolding København in 2012, he would then follow his club to join KIF Kolding København. He played there for five more seasons before retiring in 2017. When he retired, he said it was not a hard decision, as he had accomplished "more or less everything, a handball goalkeeper can achieve."

== Post-playing career ==
Hvidt has been engaged in various organisations around handball, including being on the board of Team Danmark and the National Olympic Committee and Sports Confederation of Denmark from 2005–2008. He has also been on the board of the Danish labour union for professional handballers, Håndbold Spiller Foreningen.

He was Director of Sports at Astralis Group, the group behind Astralis and Origen, from August 2017 to June 2023.

At the 2025 World Men's Handball Championship and 2026 European Men's Handball Championship he has worked as a commentator on Danish television.
