= Alberto Entrerríos =

Spanish handball player (born 1976)

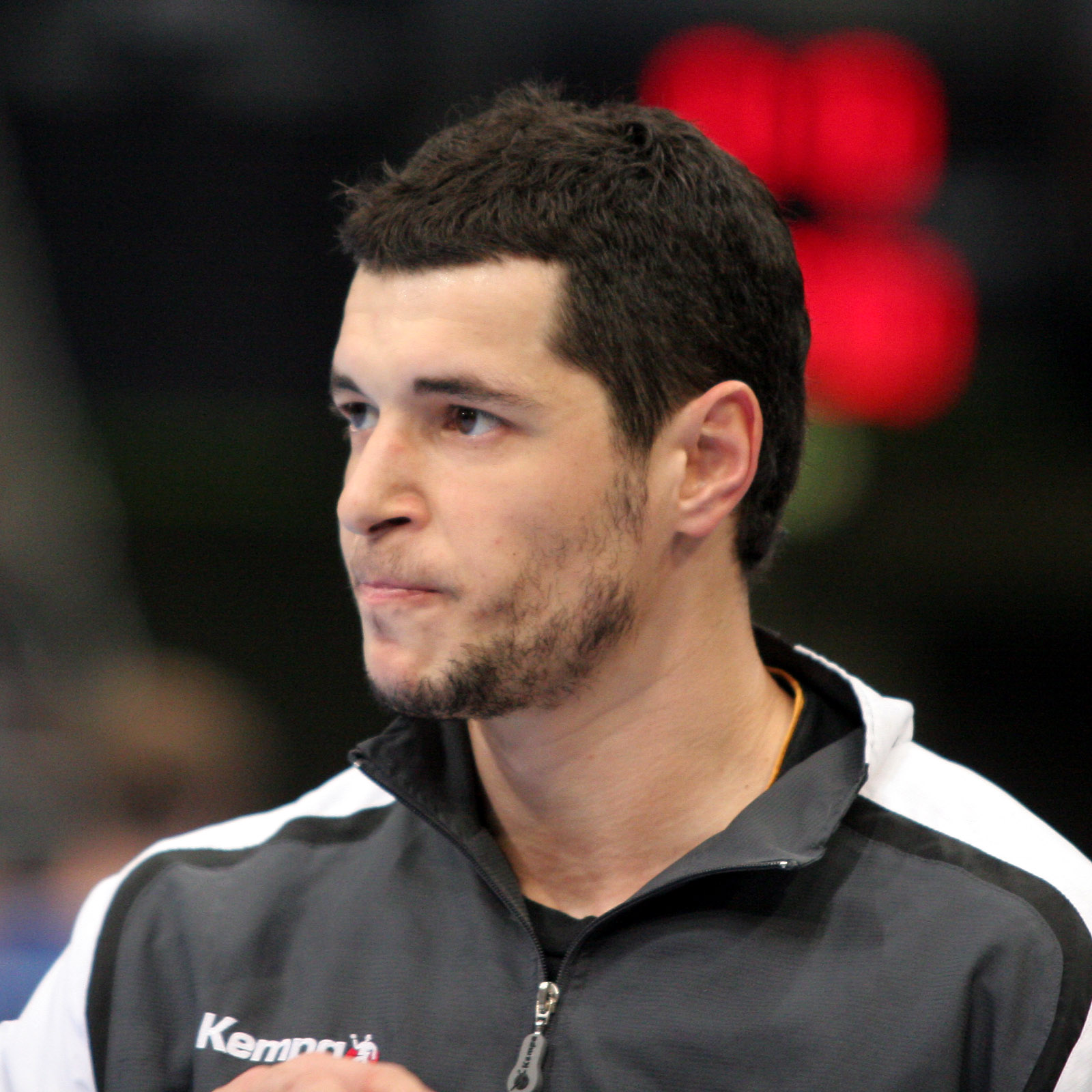

Personal information
- Full name: Alberto Entrerrios Rodríguez
- Born: 7 November 1976 (age 49) Gijón, Spain
- Height: 1.92 m (6 ft 4 in)

Sport
- Sport: Handball
- Position: Left back

Senior clubs
- Years: Team
- 1997–1998: Naranco
- 1998–2001: Ademar
- 2001–2002: Barcelona
- 2002–2012: BM Ciudad Real
- 2012–2016: HBC Nantes
National team
Years	Team	Apps	(Gls)
1997–2013	Spain	240	(726)

Teams managed
- 2016–2019: HBC Nantes (assistant)
- 2019–2022: HBC Nantes
- 2022–: Limoges Handball
Medal record
Men's Handball
Representing Spain
Summer Olympics
Bronze medal – third place	2008 Beijing	National team
World Championships
Gold medal – first place	2005 Tunisia	Team
Gold medal – first place	2013 Spain	Team
Bronze medal – third place	2011 Sweden	Team
European Championships
Silver medal – second place	2006 Switzerland	Team
Bronze medal – third place	2000 Croatia	Team

Alberto Entrerrios Rodríguez (Note: In this Spanish name, the first or paternal surname is Entrerrios and the second or maternal family name is Rodríguez.) (born 7 November 1976) is a Spanish former professional handball player.

He is 192 cm tall and weighs 102 kg. He spent 10 seasons (2002–2012) playing for BM Ciudad Real and 1 season (2011–2012) for BM Atlético de Madrid.He has won the Champions League title with BM Ciudad Real, together with two World Championships (Tunisia 2005 and Spain 2013) with the Spanish national team. He accounts for 225 international matches with Spain, which makes him a seasoned international handball player.

His brother Raúl Entrerríos is also a Spanish international handball player.

== Honours ==
As a player

- Spain National European handball team (225 caps)
- EHF Champions League winner: 2006, 2008, 2009
- Winner of the Spanish League: 2004, 2007, 2008, 2009, 2010
- 2013 World Championship All-Star Team

As a coach

- Best Coach of EHF Champions League: 2021
