= Carlos Lima (handballer) =

Swiss handball player

Carlos Lima Fuentes
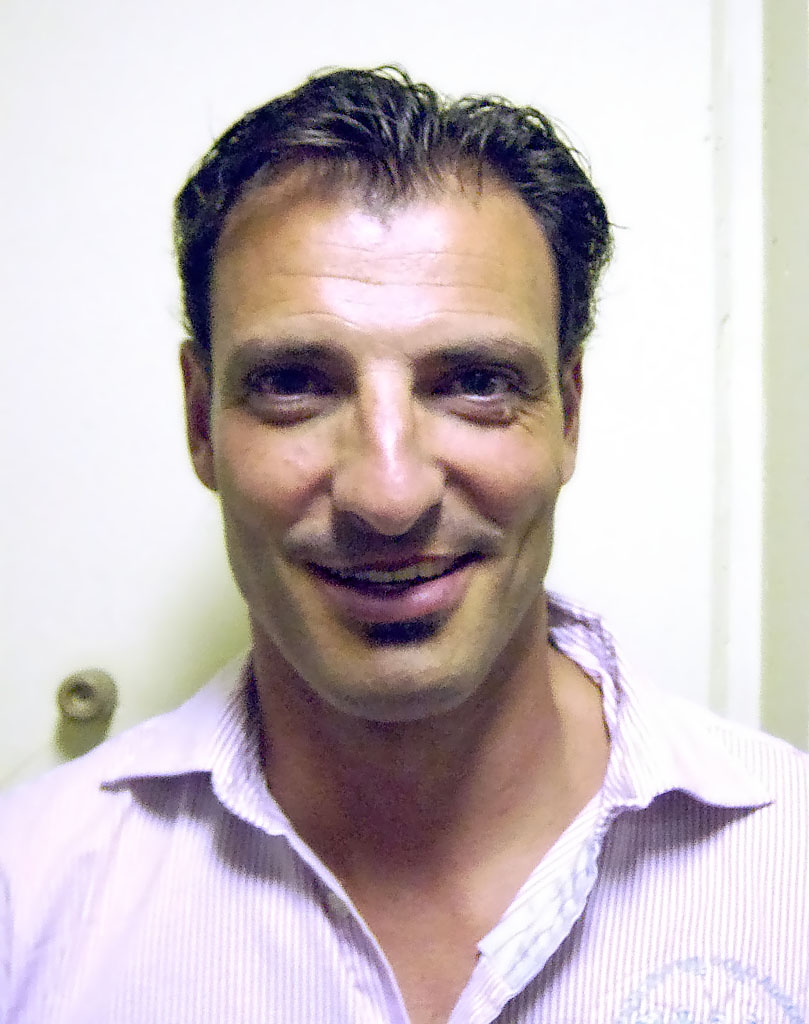

Personal information
- Nationality: Switzerland
- Born: 21 February 1970 (age 56) Lucerne, Switzerland
- Height: 188 cm (74 in)

Sport
- Sport: Handball
National team
Years	Team	Apps
?-?	Switzerland	6
- Updated on only during the 1996 Summer Olympics

Carlos Lima Fuentes (born 21 February 1970) is a Swiss male handball player, and coach.

He was a member of the Switzerland men's national handball team. He was part of the team at the 1996 Summer Olympics, playing six matches.

== Career ==
During the 2004-2005 season, he played for the Spanish first division club CB Torrevieja, where he scored 59 goals in 28 matches.
