= Copa de España (handball) =

Annual handball cup

- Founded: 1990
- No. of teams: 4
- Country: Spain
- Confederation: EHF
- Most recent champion: FC Barcelona (2026)
- Most titles: FC Barcelona (21 titles)
- Broadcasters: Teledeporte, RTVE Play, Esport3
- Website: RFEBM

The Copa de España is an annual handball cup competition for Liga ASOBAL teams. It was first played for in 1990 and is contested by the top four teams at the end of the first half of the Liga ASOBAL season. Until the 2022-23 season included, it was called the Copa ASOBAL.

== Season by season ==
Season	Venue	Champion	Runners-up	Score
2025–26	Telde	FC Barcelona	Recoletas Atlético Valladolid	32–24
2024–25	Tías	FC Barcelona	Torrelavega	37–34
2023–24	Irun	FC Barcelona	BM Logroño La Rioja	31–28
2022–23	León	FC Barcelona	Ademar León	39–21
2021–22	Zaragoza	FC Barcelona	Bidasoa Irún	37–29
2020–21	Santander	FC Barcelona	Liberbank Cantabria Sinfín	33–23
2019–20	Valladolid	FC Barcelona	Bidasoa Irún	30–22
2018–19	Lleida	FC Barcelona	Bidasoa Irún	37–23
2017–18	León	FC Barcelona	ABANCA Ademar León	28–22
2016–17	León	FC Barcelona	BM Granollers	30–25
2015–16	León	FC Barcelona	Naturhouse La Rioja	35–31
2014–15	León	FC Barcelona	BM Granollers	37–26
2013–14	Barcelona	FC Barcelona	BM Granollers	34–28
2012–13	Vigo	FC Barcelona	Atlético Madrid	32–24
2011–12	León	FC Barcelona	Ademar León	28–27
2010–11	Vigo	Renovalia Ciudad Real	Barcelona Borges	34–31
2009–10	Córdoba	FC Barcelona	BM Ciudad Real	34–33
2008–09	Barcelona	Ademar León	FC Barcelona	31–25
2007–08	Valladolid	BM Ciudad Real	Ademar León	25–23
2006–07	León	BM Ciudad Real	Portland San Antonio	29–27
2005–06	Zaragoza	BM Ciudad Real	Portland San Antonio	31–23
2004–05	Roquetas de Mar	BM Ciudad Real	Portland San Antonio	39–36
2003–04	Ciudad Real	BM Ciudad Real	FC Barcelona	29–18
2002–03	Valladolid	BM Valladolid	FC Barcelona	28–27
2001–02	León	FC Barcelona	Portland San Antonio	26–25
2000–01	Córdoba	FC Barcelona	Portland San Antonio	29–28
1999–00	Pamplona	FC Barcelona	Portland San Antonio	24–21
1998–99	Zaragoza	Ademar León	FC Barcelona	31–30
1997–98	León	Caja Cantabria	Ademar León	26–24
1996–97	Santander	Caja Cantabria	Ademar León	24–23
1995–96	Castellón	FC Barcelona	Caja Cantabria	24–23
1994–95	Vigo	FC Barcelona	Caja Cantabria	30–22
1993–94	Alcobendas	BM Granollers	FC Barcelona	21–19
1992–93	Moguer	Elgorriaga Bidasoa	Teka Santander	27–23
1991–92	Santander	Teka Santander	Elgorriaga Bidasoa	26–25
1990–91	Ibiza	Teka Santander	Alzira Avidesa	30–29

== Titles by team ==
Titles	Team	Season
21	FC Barcelona	1994–95, 1995–96, 1999–00, 2000–01, 2001–02, 2009–10, 2011–12, 2012–13, 2013–14, 2014–15, 2015–16, 2016–17, 2017–18, 2018–19, 2019–20, 2020–21, 2021–22, 2022–23, 2023–24, 2024–25, 2025–26
6	Ciudad Real	2003–04, 2004–05, 2005–06, 2006–07, 2007–08, 2010–11
4	Teka Cantabria	1990–91, 1991–92, 1996–97, 1997–98
2	Ademar León	1998–99, 2008–09
1	Valladolid	2002–03
1	Granollers	1993–94
1	Bidasoa	1992–93
