= Spain men's national handball team =

Spain

Information
- Nickname: Hispanos
- Association: Royal Spanish Handball Federation
- Coach: Jordi Ribera
- Assistant coach: Fermín Iturri; Ignacio Torrescusa
- Most caps: Raúl Entrerríos (294)
- Most goals: Juanín García (822)

Colours
1st	2nd

Results

Summer Olympics
- Appearances: 12 (First in 1972)
- Best result: (bronze) 3rd (1996, 2000, 2008, 2020, 2024)

World Championship
- Appearances: 23 (First in 1958)
- Best result: (gold) 1st (2005, 2013)

European Handball Championship
- Appearances: 17 (First in 1994)
- Best result: (gold) 1st (2018, 2020)
- Last updated on Unknown.

Spain men's national handball team
Medal record

Olympic Games
Bronze medal – third place	1996 Atlanta	Team
Bronze medal – third place	2000 Sydney	Team
Bronze medal – third place	2008 Beijing	Team
Bronze medal – third place	2020 Tokyo	Team
Bronze medal – third place	2024 Paris	Team

World Championship
Gold medal – first place	2005 Tunisia	
Gold medal – first place	2013 Spain	
Bronze medal – third place	2011 Sweden	
Bronze medal – third place	2021 Egypt	
Bronze medal – third place	2023 Poland/Sweden	

European Championship
Gold medal – first place	2018 Croatia	
Gold medal – first place	2020 Sweden/Austria/Norway	
Silver medal – second place	1996 Spain	
Silver medal – second place	1998 Italy	
Silver medal – second place	2006 Switzerland	
Silver medal – second place	2016 Poland	
Silver medal – second place	2022 Hungary/Slovakia	
Bronze medal – third place	2000 Croatia	
Bronze medal – third place	2014 Denmark	

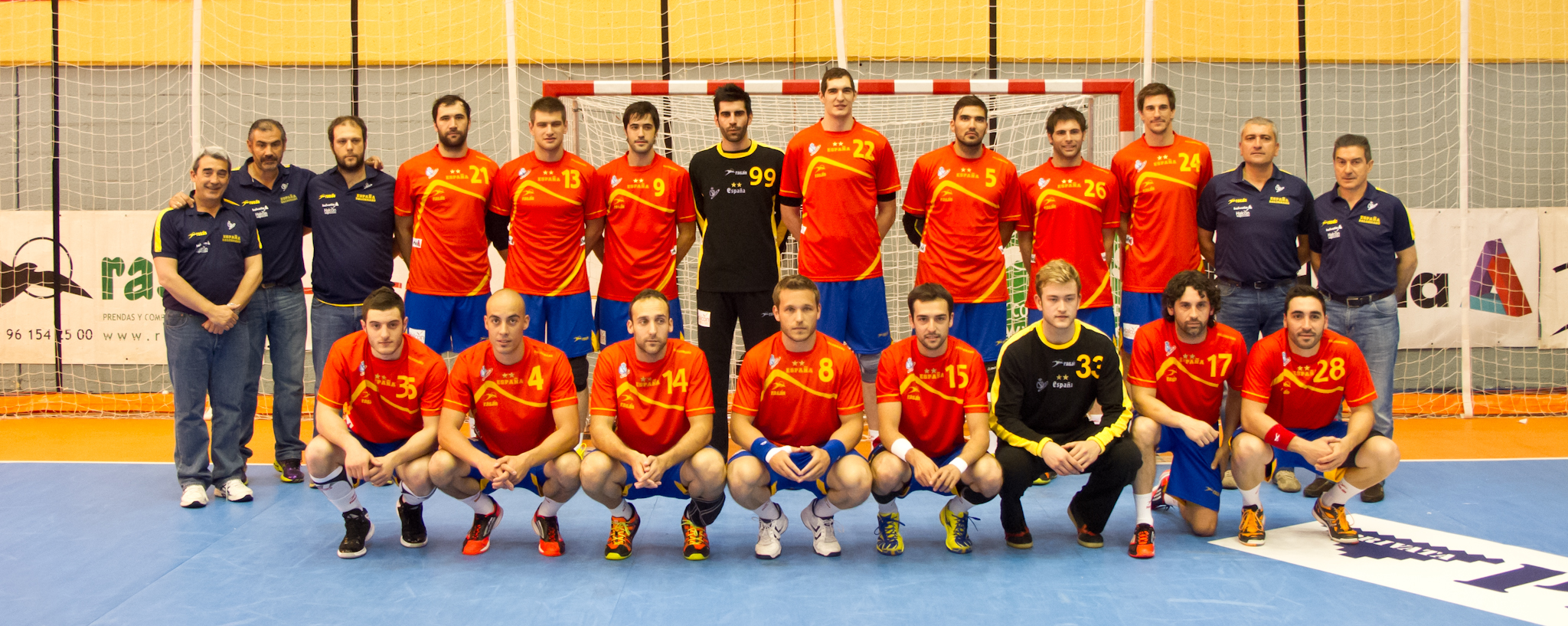
Spain national handball team in 2013.

The Spain national handball team is governed by the Royal Spanish Handball Federation. Spain is one of the most successful handball teams in the world, having won two World Championships and two European Championships. They also have won medals in the three main international competitions: nine at European Championships, five at World Championships and five at Olympic Games (1996 Atlanta, 2000 Sydney, 2008 Beijing, 2020 Tokyo and 2024 Paris).

== Honours ==
Competition	1st place, gold medalist(s)	2nd place, silver medalist(s)	3rd place, bronze medalist(s)	Total
Olympic Games	0	0	5	5
World Championship	2	0	3	5
European Championship	2	5	2	9
Total	4	5	10	19

== Competitive record ==
Champions Runners-up Third place Fourth place

=== Olympic Games ===
Games	Round	Position	Pld	W	D	L	GF	GA	GD
(Germany) 1936 Berlin	did not enter								
Not held from 1948 to 1968
(West Germany) 1972 Munich	Match for 15th place	15th of 16	5	1	0	4	82	89	−7
(Canada) 1976 Montreal	did not qualify								
(Soviet Union) 1980 Moscow	Match for 5th place	5th of 12	6	3	1	2	126	129	−3
(United States) 1984 Los Angeles	Match for 7th place	8th of 12	6	2	0	4	122	124	−2
(South Korea) 1988 Seoul	Match for 9th place	9th of 12	6	3	0	3	122	121	+1
(Spain) 1992 Barcelona	Match for 5th place	5th of 12	6	4	0	2	133	119	+14
(United States) 1996 Atlanta	Third place	3rd of 12	7	5	0	2	161	147	+14
(Australia) 2000 Sydney	Third place	3rd of 12	8	5	0	3	222	206	+16
(Greece) 2004 Athens	Match for 7th place	7th of 12	8	5	0	3	242	220	+22
(China) 2008 Beijing	Third place	3rd of 12	8	5	0	3	246	234	+12
(United Kingdom) 2012 London	Quarter-finals	7th of 12	6	3	0	3	162	149	+13
(Brazil) 2016 Rio de Janeiro	did not qualify								
(Japan) 2020 Tokyo	Third place	3rd of 12	8	6	0	2	245	233	+12
(France) 2024 Paris	Third place	3rd of 12	8	5	0	3	227	223	+4
(United States) 2028 Los Angeles	TBD								
(Australia) 2032 Brisbane	TBD								
Total	12/15	0 Titles	82	47	1	34	2,090	1,994	+96

=== World Championship ===
Year	Position	Pld	W	D	L
(Germany) 1938	did not enter				
(Sweden) 1954	did not enter				
(East Germany) 1958	12th	3	1	0	2
(West Germany) 1961	did not enter				
(Czechoslovakia) 1964	did not enter				
(Sweden) 1967	did not enter				
(France) 1970	did not enter				
(East Germany) 1974	13th	3	1	0	2
(Denmark) 1978	10th	6	3	0	3
(West Germany) 1982	8th	7	3	1	3
(Switzerland) 1986	5th	7	3	2	2
(Czechoslovakia) 1990	5th	7	5	0	2
(Sweden) 1993	5th	7	4	1	2
(Iceland) 1995	11th	9	6	0	3
(Japan) 1997	7th	9	6	1	2
(Egypt) 1999	4th	9	7	0	2
(France) 2001	5th	9	7	0	2
(Portugal) 2003	4th	9	7	0	2
(Tunisia) 2005	1st place, gold medalist(s)	10	8	1	1
(Germany) 2007	7th	10	6	0	4
(Croatia) 2009	13th	9	6	0	3
(Sweden) 2011	3rd place, bronze medalist(s)	10	8	1	1
(Spain) 2013	1st place, gold medalist(s)	9	8	0	1
(Qatar) 2015	4th	9	7	0	2
(France) 2017	5th	7	6	0	1
(Denmark) / (Germany) 2019	7th	9	6	0	3
(Egypt) 2021	3rd place, bronze medalist(s)	9	7	1	1
(Poland) / (Sweden) 2023	3rd place, bronze medalist(s)	9	7	0	2
(Croatia) / (Denmark) / (Norway) 2025	18th	6	2	1	3
(Germany) 2027	Qualified				
(France) / (Germany) 2029	TBD				
(Denmark) / (Iceland) / (Norway) 2031	TBD				
Total	24/29	182	124	9	49

=== Euro Tournaments ===
All teams in these tournaments are European,all World and Olympic Champions, and top 7 from World Championships and Olympics were participating. They were mini European championships at the time, till 1994 when official European Championship started.

EURO World Cup tournament Sweden

- 1971 (Sweden) : 8th place
- 1984 (Sweden) : 7th place
- 1988 (Sweden) : 7th place
- 1992 (Sweden) : Third

EURO Super Cup tournament Germany

- 1991 (Germany) : Champions
- 2003 (Germany) : Champions

=== European Championship ===
Final tournament								Qualification				
Year	Position	Pld	W	D	L	GS	GA	Position	Pld	W	D	L
(Portugal) 1994	5th	6	4	0	2	142	126	1st	8	7	0	1
(Spain) 1996	2nd place, silver medalist(s)	7	5	0	2	173	162	Directly qualified				
(Italy) 1998	2nd place, silver medalist(s)	7	5	1	1	187	150	2nd	6	3	1	2
(Croatia) 2000	3rd place, bronze medalist(s)	7	5	0	2	173	166		2	2	0	0
(Sweden) 2002	7th	7	4	1	2	186	173	Directly qualified				
(Slovenia) 2004	10th	6	2	0	4	166	170		2	2	0	0
(Switzerland) 2006	2nd place, silver medalist(s)	8	6	1	1	255	231		2	1	1	0
(Norway) 2008	9th	6	3	0	3	180	169	Directly qualified				
(Austria) 2010	6th	7	4	1	2	213	192	1st	8	7	0	1
(Serbia) 2012	4th	8	5	1	2	224	213	2nd	6	4	0	2
(Denmark) 2014	3rd place, bronze medalist(s)	8	6	0	2	239	218	1st	6	6	0	0
(Poland) 2016	2nd place, silver medalist(s)	8	5	1	2	209	207	1st	6	5	0	1
(Croatia) 2018	1st place, gold medalist(s)	8	6	0	2	225	189	1st	6	6	0	0
(Austria) (Norway) (Sweden) 2020	1st place, gold medalist(s)	9	8	1	0	278	226	Directly qualified				
(Hungary) (Slovakia) 2022	2nd place, silver medalist(s)	9	7	0	2	249	232	Directly qualified				
(Germany) 2024	13th	3	1	1	1	98	96	Directly qualified				
(Denmark) (Sweden) (Norway) 2026	11th	7	3	0	4	219	224		6	5	0	1
(Portugal) (Spain) (Switzerland) 2028	Qualified as co-host							Qualified as co-host				
(Czech Republic) (Denmark) (Poland) 2030	To be determined							To be determined				
(France) (Germany) 2032	To be determined							To be determined				
Total	18/20	121	79	8	34	3416	3144					

== Team ==
=== Current squad ===
Roster for the 2026 European Men's Handball Championship.

Head coach: Jordi Ribera

No.	Pos.	Name	Date of birth (age)	Height	App.	Goals	Club
5	LB	Antonio Serradilla	10 January 1999 (age 27)	1.98 m	16	9	(Germany) TVB Stuttgart
7	LB	Jan Gurri Aregay	10 June 2002 (age 24)	1.90 m	22	31	(Portugal) Sporting CP
8	LB	Agustín Casado	21 May 1996 (age 30)	1.93 m	74	185	(France) Montpellier Handball
9	CB	Ian Tarrafeta	4 January 1999 (age 27)	1.88 m	73	176	(France) HBC Nantes
10	RB	Alex Dujshebaev	17 December 1992 (age 33)	1.88 m	174	504	(Poland) KS Iskra Kielce
11	RW	Kauldi Odriozola	7 January 1997 (age 29)	1.83 m	81	205	(France) HBC Nantes
18	RB	Imanol Garciandia	30 April 1995 (age 31)	2.03 m	78	204	(Hungary) SC Pick Szeged
20	P	Abel Serdio	16 April 1994 (age 32)	1.95 m	66	129	(Poland) Wisła Płock
22	RB	Marcos Fis Ballester	1 April 2007 (age 19)	1.88 m	3	10	(Spain) BM Granollers
24	LB	Daniel Dujshebaev	4 July 1997 (age 29)	1.96 m	111	244	(Poland) KS Iskra Kielce
25	GK	Sergey Hernández	17 June 1995 (age 31)	1.98 m	69	12	(Germany) SC Magdeburg
28	RW	Aleix Gómez	7 May 1997 (age 29)	1.83 m	100	407	(Spain) FC Barcelona
33	CB	Natan Suárez	20 January 1998 (age 28)	1.85 m	2	3	(Portugal) Sporting CP
37	P	Víctor Romero Holguín	9 March 2004 (age 22)	1.92 m	12	29	(Portugal) Sporting CP
53	GK	Ignacio Biosca	17 July 1995 (age 31)	2.00 m	11	1	(France) HBC Nantes
70	LW	Daniel Fernández Jiménez	28 March 2001 (age 25)	1.80 m	63	210	(Spain) FC Barcelona
80	LW	Ian Barrufet	19 May 2004 (age 22)	1.98 m	15	27	(Spain) FC Barcelona
99	P	Javier Rodríguez Moreno	22 July 2002 (age 24)	1.98 m	30	47	(Portugal) Benfica

=== Individual records ===
- **Bold** denotes players still playing international handball.

==== Most capped players ====
#	Player	Matches
1	Raúl Entrerríos	294
2	David Barrufet	280
3	José Javier Hombrados	260
4	Viran Morros	259
5	Lorenzo Rico	245
6	Juan Francisco Muñoz	243
7	Alberto Entrerríos	240
8	Joan Cañellas	237
9	Mateo Garralda	233
10	Eugenio Serrano	231

Last updated: 25 July 2024

==== Top scorers ====
#	Player	Goals
1	Juanín García	822
2	Iker Romero	753
3	Alberto Entrerríos	726
4	Juan Francisco Muñoz	701
5	Raúl Entrerríos	681
6	Enric Masip	656
7	Eugenio Serrano	622
8	Albert Rocas	599
9	Mateo Garralda	593
10	Joan Cañellas	570

Last updated: 25 July 2024
