= Blaženko Lacković =

Croatian handball player (born 1980)

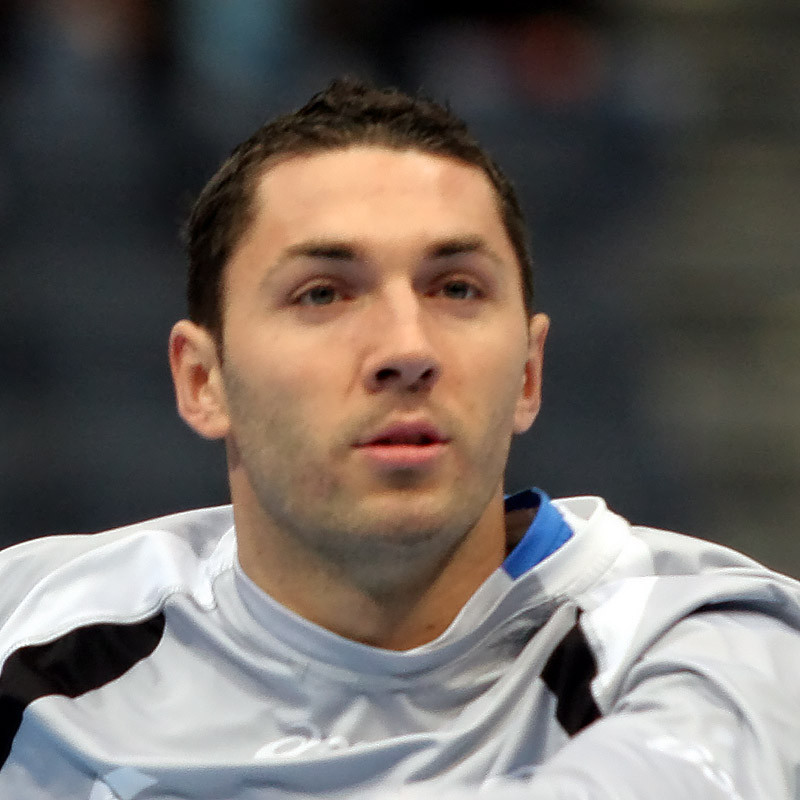

Personal information
- Full name: Blaženko Lacković
- Nationality: Croatian
- Born: 25 December 1980 (age 45) Novi Marof, SR Croatia, Yugoslavia
- Height: 1.97 m (6 ft 6 in)

Sport
- Sport: Handball
- Position: Left back

Senior clubs
- Years: Team
- 1997–2001: RK Varteks Di Caprio
- 2001–2004: Badel 1862 Zagreb
- 2004–2008: SG Flensburg-Handewitt
- 2008–2014: HSV Hamburg
- 2014–2016: RK Vardar
- 2016–2017: THW Kiel
- 2017–2020: HSV Hamburg
National team
Years	Team	Apps	(Gls)
2001–2013	Croatia	195	(571)

Teams managed
- 2020–: HSV Hamburg (Assistant)
Medal record
Men's handball
Representing Croatia
Olympic Games
Gold medal – first place	2004 Athens	Team competition
Bronze medal – third place	2012 London	Team competition
World Championship
Gold medal – first place	2003 Portugal	Team competition
Silver medal – second place	2005 Tunisia	Team competition
Silver medal – second place	2009 Croatia	Team competition
Bronze medal – third place	2013 Spain	Team competition
European Championship
Silver medal – second place	2008 Norway	Team competition
Silver medal – second place	2010 Austria	Team competition
Bronze medal – third place	2012 Serbia	Team competition
Mediterranean Games
Gold medal – first place	2001 Tunis	Team competition

Blaženko Lacković (born 25 December 1980) is a retired Croatian handball player.

He is World champion from 2003, and Olympic champion from 2004 with the Croatia national team. He received silver medals at the 2005 and 2009 World championships, silver medals at the 2008 and 2010 European championships and bronze medals at the 2012 Summer Olympics, the 2012 European Championship and the 2013 World Championship.

== Clubs ==
Lacković has played for the Croatian clubs RK Varteks di Caprio, Metković and RK Zagreb. He was a member of German club SG Flensburg-Handewitt, which reached the EHF Champions League final in 2007. He eventually won the title with HSV Hamburg during the 2012–13 season. After six years in Hamburg Lacković signed for Macedonian side RK Vardar Skopje in the summer of 2014.On 3 February 2016, Lackovic signed for German club THW Kiel. In Kiel he plays with his teammates in national team Domagoj Duvnjak and Ilija Brozovic.

== Honours ==
Zagreb

- Croatian First League (3): 2001–02, 2002–03, 2003–04
- Croatian Cup (3): 2002, 2003, 2004

Flensburg

- DHB-Pokal (1): 2005
- EHF Champions League Finalist (1): 2006-07

HSV

- Bundesliga (1): 2010-11
- DHB-Pokal (1): 2010
- Super Cup (2): 2009, 2010
- EHF Champions League (1): 2012-13

Vardar

- Macedonian Super League (2): 2014–15, 2015–16
- Macedonian Cup (2): 2015, 2016
- SEHA League (1): 2015-16

Kiel

- DHB-Pokal (1): 2017

Individual

- Franjo Bučar State Award for Sport - 2004
- 3rd top assist at 2006 European Championship
- Best left back at 2009 World Championship

=== Orders ===
- Order of Danica Hrvatska with face of Franjo Bučar
