= Michael Kraus (handballer) =

German handball player (born 1983)

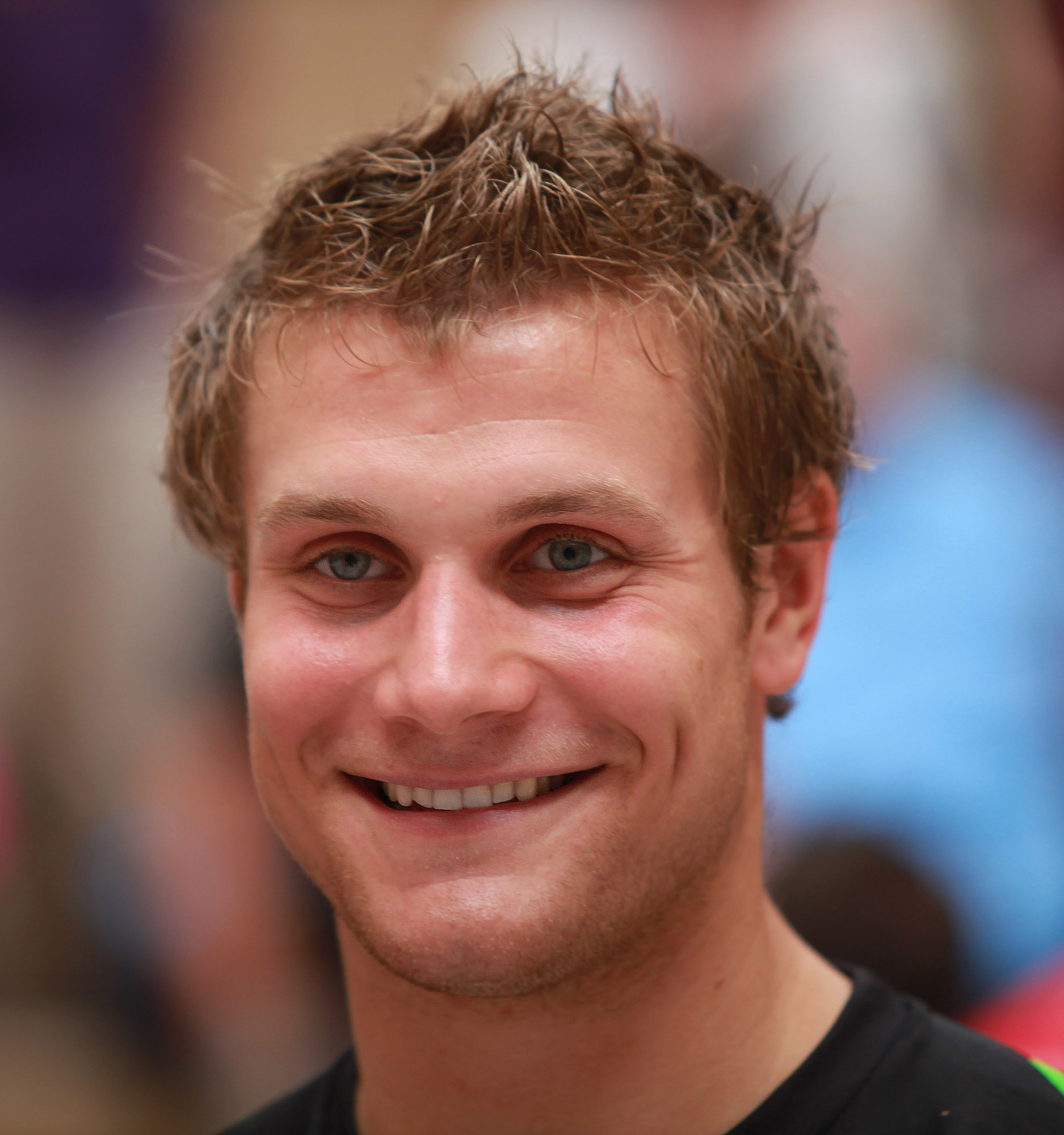

Personal information
- Nationality: German
- Born: 28 September 1983 (age 43) Göppingen, West Germany
- Height: 1.87 m (6 ft 2 in)

Sport
- Sport: Handball
- Position: Centre back
- Current club: TVB 1898 Stuttgart
- Number: 10

Youth career
- Years: Team
- –: TSG Eislingen
- –: TS Göppingen

Senior clubs
- Years: Team
- 2002 – 2007: Frisch Auf Göppingen
- 2007 – 2010: TBV Lemgo
- 2010 – 2013: HSV Hamburg
- 2013 – 2016: Frisch Auf Göppingen
- 2016 – 2019: TVB 1898 Stuttgart
- 2019 – 2020: SG BBM Bietigheim
- 2026 –: Los Angeles Team Handball Club
National team
Years	Team	Apps	(Gls)
2005–	Germany	129	(401)
Medal record
World Championship
Gold medal – first place	2007 Germany	Team

Michael "Mimi" Kraus (born 28 September 1983) is a former German handballer. He is a world champion from the 2007 World Champion. For this he was awarded the Silbernes Lorbeerblatt.

== Career ==
Kraus played youth handball at TSG Eislingen and TS Göppingen. He started his senior career at Frisch Auf Göppingen in 2002 before moving to TBV Lemgo in 2007. He then HSV Hamburg in 2010 for a 300.000€ transfer fee. After winning the EHF Champions League with Hamburg he returned to play for his hometown club.

In July 2014 Kraus was suspended by the German Handball Association's Anti-Doping Commission, for three different control violations. In August the same year, he was acquitted of the charge, as 'no fault could be proven against him'. The German Anti-Doping Agency appealed the decision, after which the parties agreed on an arbitration, which suspended Kraus retroactively for three months.

In 2016 he won the EHF Cup with Frisch Auf Göppingen, beating French HBC Nantes in the final.

The following summer he joined TVB 1898 Stuttgart. In 2019 he moved to TVB 1989 Stuttgart, with another move to SG BBM Bietigheim in 2019 until 2020. He retired in 2020, when he was released of his contract with Bietigheim.

In 2026 he returned to the handball court, when he joined American Los Angeles Team Handball Club. Here he won the 2026 American Championship.

=== National team ===
Kraus was a German international since 2005. On January 28, 2008, he was dropped from the German national team squad for the upcoming international matches by then-national coach Heiner Brand. Brand cited his perceived poor performance at the 2008 European Men's Handball Championship as the reason for his decision.. In February 2008 he was recalled, and then represented Germany at the 2008 Summer Olympics in Beijing, where his team placed 9th.

From 2011 to 2014 he was once again out of the German national team, but returned on April 4th, 2014 in a match against Hungary.

== Private ==
Kraus has a twin sister named Alena. His older brother Christian Kraus was a multiple German champion and also double youth world champion sabre fencer. His sister-in-law is TV presenter Tina Kraus.

After retiring and opened a gym with his wife, German YouTuber Isabel "Bella" Kraus, who he married in 2014 and with whom he has four children, two girls and two boys.

== Titles ==
Hamburg

- 2012-13 EHF Champions League: Winner
- 2010-11 Handball-Bundesliga: Winner
- DHB-Supercup 2010: WInner

Lemgo

- 2009-10 EHF Cup: Winner

Frisch Auf Göppingen

- 2015-16 EHF Cup: Winner
- 2005-06 EHF Cup: Finalist

Los Angeles

- American Championship 2026: Winner
