= Torsten Jansen =

German handball player (born 1976)

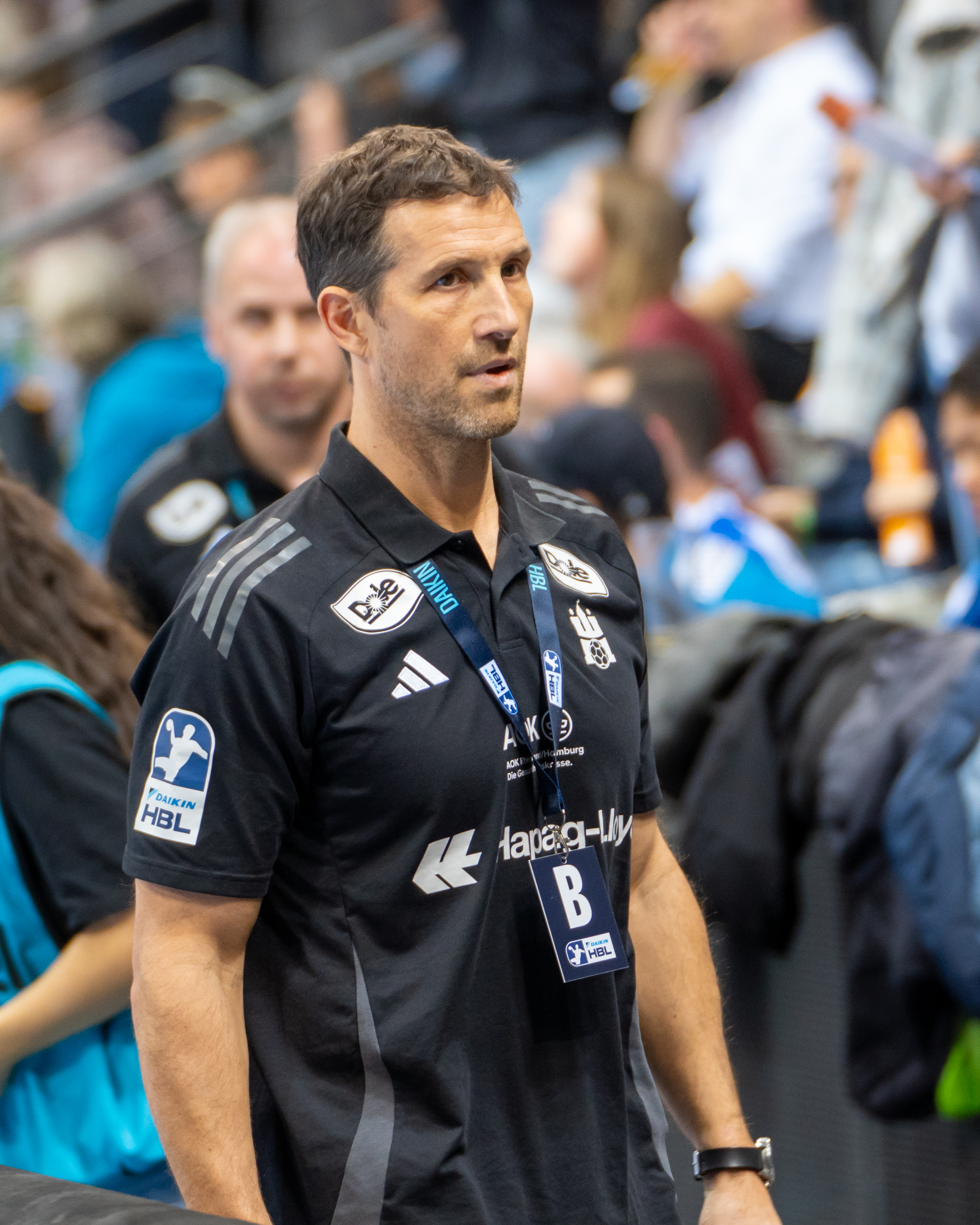

Personal information
- Nationality: German
- Born: 23 December 1976 (age 49) Adenau, West Germany
- Height: 1.85 m (6 ft 1 in)

Sport
- Sport: Handball
- Position: Left Wing
- Number: 5

Youth career
- Years: Team
- 1982–1992: TV Witzhelden
- 1992–1994: Wermelskirchener TV

Senior clubs
- Years: Team
- 1994–1995: TUSEM Essen
- 1995–2001: SG Solingen
- 2001–2003: HSG Nordhorn
- 2003–2015: HSV Hamburg
- 2015–2016: THW Kiel
- 2016–2017: HSV Hamburg
National team
Years	Team	Apps	(Gls)
1999–?	Germany	178	(503)

Teams managed
- 2017–: HSV Hamburg
Medal record
Olympic Games
Silver medal – second place	2004 Athens	Team Competition
World Men's Handball Championship
Gold medal – first place	2007 Germany	Team competition
European Championship
Gold medal – first place	2004 Slovenia	Team competition
Silver medal – second place	2002 Sweden	Team competition

Torsten "Toto" Jansen (born 23 December 1976) is a former German handballer, who spent the majority of his career playing for HSV Hamburg in the Bundesliga. He was also a regular member of the German national team. He was known as a good defensive player. In March 2017 he took over as head coach of the Handball Sport Verein Hamburg.

He received a silver medal at the 2004 Summer Olympics in Athens and also represented Germany at the 2008 Summer Olympics in Beijing. Jansen became a World champion in 2007, and European champion in 2004. He has been awarded the Silbernen Lorbeerblatt for his triumph at the 2007 world championship.

== Career ==
Jansen won the Bundesliga 2011 with HSV Hamburg.

Jansen was early in his career known to be a fair play player, but was suspended for 10 matches in 2013 after head butting Ivan Ninčević during a match between Füchse Berlin and HSV Hamburg. He was also fined 15,000 euros for the incident.

In 2015-16 he transferred to THW Kiel to replace Dominik Klein who was out with a long term injury due to a torn cruciate ligament.

== Coaching career ==
On March 29th 2017 he took over the coaching position at his former club HSV Hamburg replacing Jens Häusler. In 2021 he managed to get the club promoted to the Handball-Bundesliga.

== Titles ==
=== Club ===
- Bundesliga 2011
- EHF Cup Winners' Cup 2007
- DHB-Pokal-Sieger 2006 und 2010
- DHB-Supercup 2004, 2006, 2009 und 2010
- EHF Champions League 2013
