= Bertrand Gille (handballer) =

French handball player (born 1978)

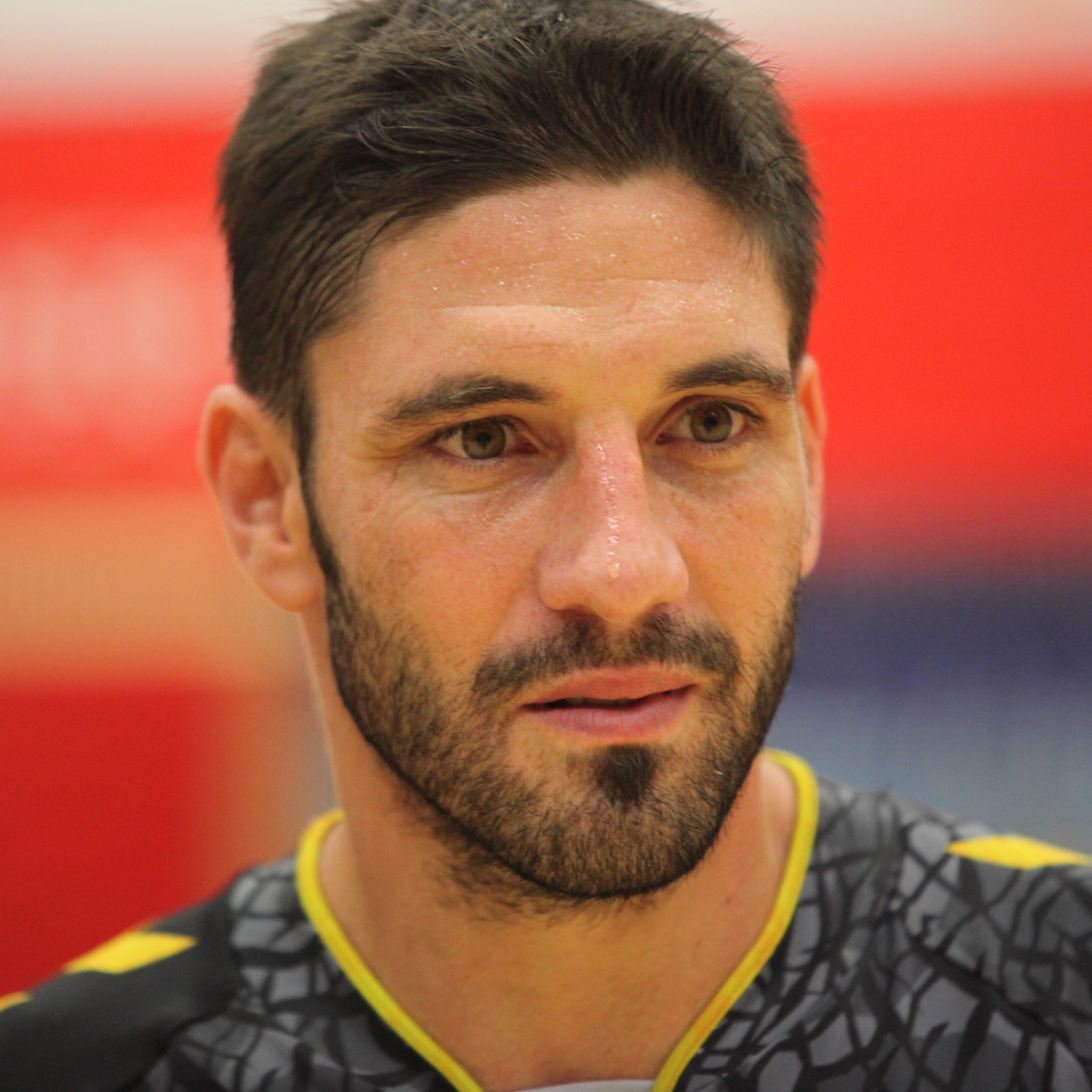
- Gille in 2014

Personal information
- Full name: Bertrand Fabien Gille
- Nationality: French
- Born: 24 March 1978 (age 48) Valence, Drôme, France
- Height: 1.87 m (6 ft 2 in)

Sport
- Sport: Handball
- Position: Pivot
- Current club: Retired

Youth career
- Years: Team
- 1984-1996: HBC Loriol

Senior clubs
- Years: Team
- 1996-2002: Chambéry Savoie Handball
- 2002–2012: HSV Hamburg
- 2012–2015: Chambéry Savoie Handball
National team
Years	Team	Apps	(Gls)
1997-2013	France	268	(806)
Medal record
Men's handball
Representing France
Olympic Games
Gold medal – first place	2008 Beijing	Team competition
Gold medal – first place	2012 London	Team competition
World Championships
Gold medal – first place	2001 France	Team competition
Gold medal – first place	2011 Sweden	Team competition
Bronze medal – third place	2003 Portugal	Team competition
Bronze medal – third place	2005 Tunisia	Team competition
European Championships
Gold medal – first place	2006 Switzerland	Team competition
Gold medal – first place	2010 Austria	Team competition
Bronze medal – third place	2008 Norway	Team competition
Mediterranean Games
Bronze medal – third place	2001 Tunis	Team competition

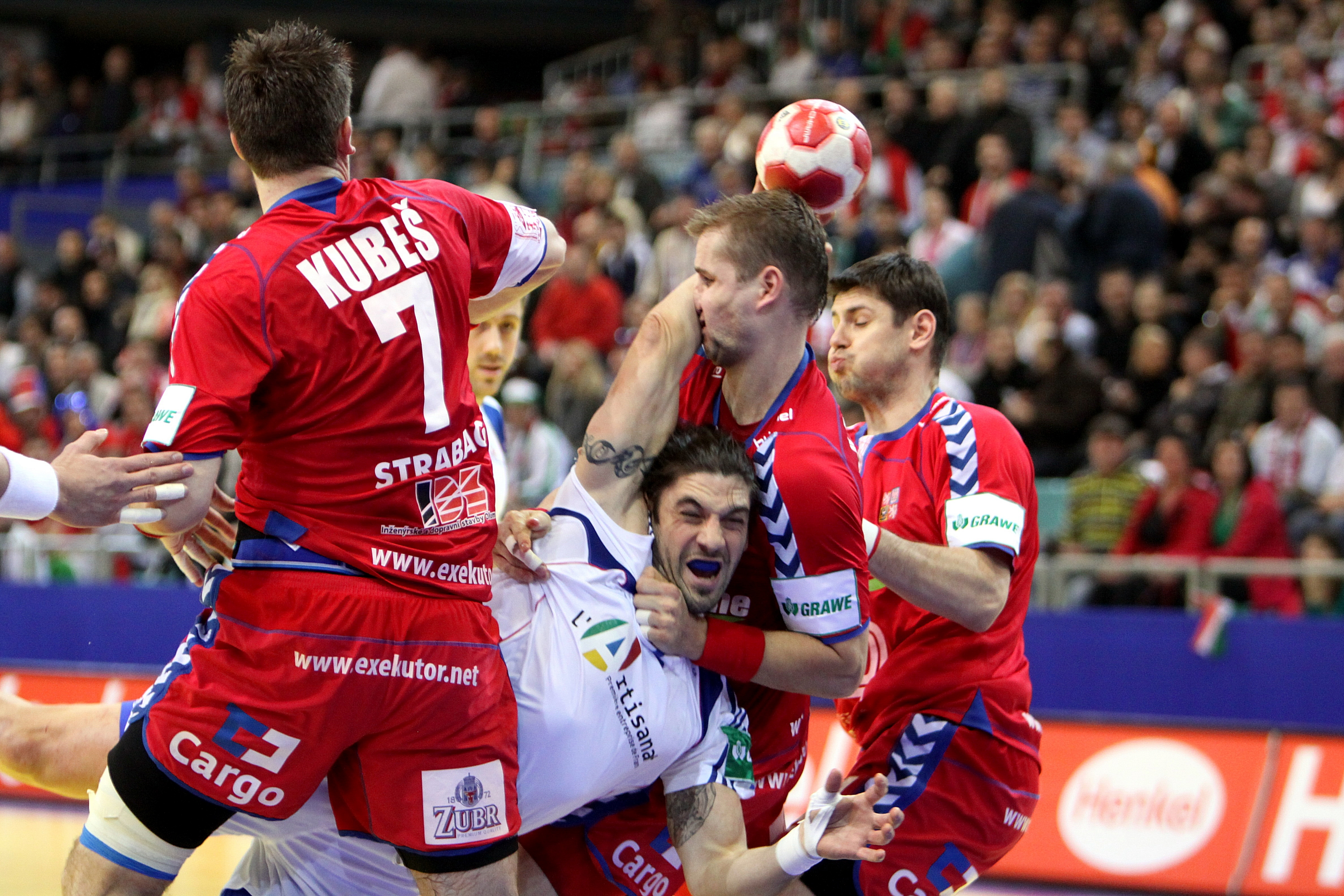
Bertrand Gille

Bertrand Fabien Gille (born 24 March 1978 in Valence, Drôme) is a retired handball player from France. Very strong physically (1.87m, 98 kg), and was honored with the title of World Player of the Year in 2002.

Barachet has been made an Officer of the Ordre national du Mérite.

== Career ==
His career as a handball player started very early: in 1984, he played for HBC Loriol and followed sport étude as a scholastic path. From 1996 to 2002, he played for Chambéry SH (under the guidance of Philippe Gardent, another famous French handball player) before joining the German club HSV Hamburg. In 2012 he returned to Chambéry. He retired in 2015.

Member of the national team since 1997, "Gilou" was again pivot on the team which, among others, won the handball competition at the 2008 Beijing Olympics, where he was also named best pivot of the tournament. He decided to suspend his international career after a physical injury contracted during the Handball-Bundesliga of 2009. His successor on the team was Cédric Sorhaindo. Now, 2010, Bertrand Gille is back on the team. He was a part of the team, who won European Championships 2010. He was also part of the French team that won the gold medal at the 2012 London Olympics.

He has been playing together with his brother, Guillaume Gille, since they were little. They played together in all three of Bertrand Gille's clubs, HBC Loriol, Chambéry SH and HSV Hamburg. At Chambéry they also played with their third brother, Benjamin Gille.

== Personal life ==
He has two brothers; Guillaume Gille, born in 1976 and Benjamin Gille, born in 1982. Bertrand Gille is married with three children. His nickname is "Bobo".

== Honours ==
- French Handball Champions 2001
- IHF World Player of the Year 2002
- Vicechampion in Germany 2004 and 2008
- German Super Cup winner 2004, 2006 and 2009
- German Cup winner 2006, 2010
- French Cup winner 2002
- Winner of EHF Cup Winners' Cup 2007
- Bronze medal from European Championship 2008
- Gold medal from Summer Olympics 2008 and 2012
- European Champion: 2010

== Seasons for HSV Hamburg ==
Season	Club	League	Games	Goals	7-Meter	All
2002/03	HSV Hamburg	Bundesliga	32	154	6	148
2003/04	HSV Hamburg	Bundesliga	34	139	0	139
2004/05	HSV Hamburg	Bundesliga	26	126	3	123
2005/06	HSV Hamburg	Bundesliga	27	101	7	94
2006/07	HSV Hamburg	Bundesliga	32	124	0	124
2007/08	HSV Hamburg	Bundesliga	29	99	3	96
2008/09	HSV Hamburg	Bundesliga	27	76	0	76
2002–2009	total	Bundesliga	207	819	19	800
