= Guillaume Gille =

French handball player (born 1976)

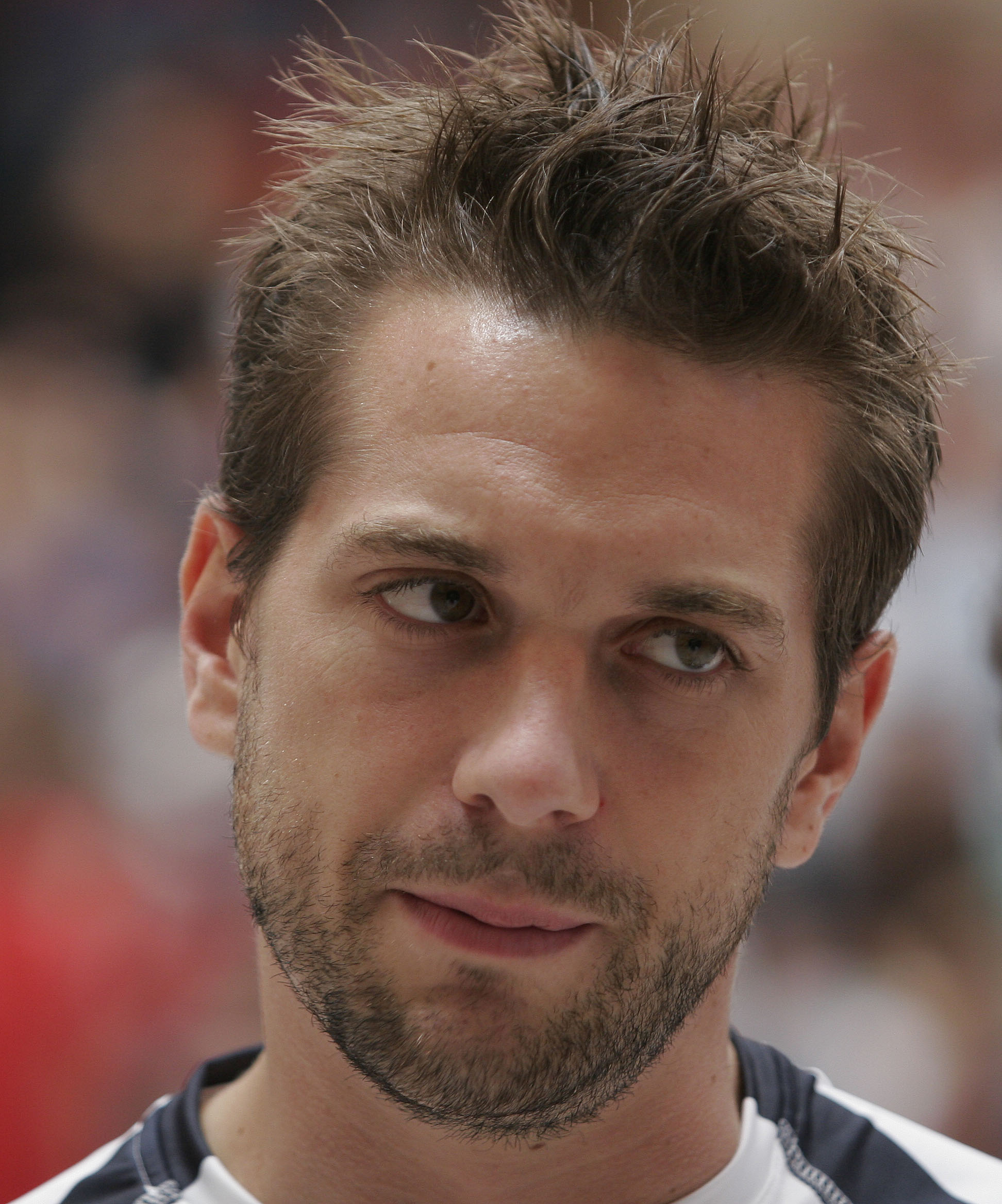
- Gille playing for HSV Hamburg in 2007

Personal information
- Full name: Guillaume Alain Gille
- Nationality: French
- Born: 12 July 1976 (age 50) Valence, Drôme, France
- Height: 1.92 m (6 ft 4 in)

Sport
- Sport: Handball
- Position: Centre back

Youth career
- Years: Team
- 1984–1996: HBC Loriol

Senior clubs
- Years: Team
- 1996–2002: Chambéry Savoie Handball
- 2002–2012: HSV Hamburg
- 2012–2015: Chambéry Savoie Handball
National team
Years	Team	Apps	(Gls)
1996–2013	France	308	(678)

Teams managed
- 2016–2020: France assistant
- 2020–2026: France
Medal record
Men's handball
Representing France
Olympic Games
Gold medal – first place	2008 Beijing	Team
Gold medal – first place	2012 London	Team
Gold medal – first place	2020 Tokyo	Coach
World Championships
Gold medal – first place	2001 France
Gold medal – first place	2009 Croatia
Bronze medal – third place	1997 Japan
Bronze medal – third place	2003 Portugal
Bronze medal – third place	2005 Tunisia
European Championships
Gold medal – first place	2006 Switzerland
Gold medal – first place	2010 Austria
Gold medal – first place	2024 Germany	Coach
Bronze medal – third place	2008 Norway
Mediterranean Games
Bronze medal – third place	2001 Tunis	Team

Guillaume Alain Gille (born 12 July 1976) is a retired French handballer and current coach.

He was the winner of the gold medal at the 2008 and 2012 Summer Olympics and is the older brother of Bertrand Gille.

== Career ==
Gille's career as a handballer began early. Already in 1984, he was playing for HBC Loriol, followed by a sport étude. From 1996 to 2002, he played for Chambéry SH, before joining HSV Hamburg in the Bundesliga. At Hamburg he won the 2006 DHB-Pokal. In 2012 he returned to Chambéry. He retired in 2015. He has been playing with his brother, Bertrand Gille, since their childhood and they played together for their entire career. At Chámbery they also played with their third brother, Benjamin Gille.

He has been a member of the French national team since 1996. Gille got his debut on 26 November 1996 against Serbia-Montenegro. He has played 276 matches and scored 658 goals in full. He was a play-maker on the team, that won the gold medal at the 2008 Summer Olympics, 2009 World Championships and 2010 European Championships. He has been a part of the French team, that completed a hat-trick by winning in 2008, 2009 and 2010.

Gille was named Hamburgs Sportler des Jahres (Hamburg athlete of the year) in 2010.

== Coaching career ==
In September 2016 he became the assistant coach on the French national team under Didier Dinart. In this position he won the 2017 World Men's Handball Championship; his first tournament as part of the French coaching team.

In 2020 he replaced Dinart has the head coach. His first major international tournament was the 2021 World Men's Handball Championship in Egypt, where France finished 4th.

At the 2020 Olympics (which were delayed to 2021) he won Gold medals. This made him the third male handballer to win Olympic gold medals both as coach and as player, behind Vladimir Maksimov (1976 & 2000) and Branislav Pokrajac (1972 & 1984).

At the 2024 European Men's Handball Championship he won another gold medal as the French coach. In the lead up to the 2024 Olympics the French Handball Federation announced that they planned to keep Gille as head coach long term until at least the 2029 World Championship.

He left the position as the head coach of France after the 2026 European Men's Handball Championship, after France had disappointingly been knocked out in the main round. He was replaced by Talant Dujshebaev.

== Personal life ==
He has two younger brothers; Bertrand Gille, born in 1978 and Benjamin Gille, born in 1982.

== Medals and victories ==
=== As player ===
- French Handball champions 2001
- Vicechampion in Germany 2004 and 2008
- Supercup winner in Germany 2004, 2006 and 2009
- German Cup-winner 2006, 2010
- French Cup-winner 2002
- Winner of Cup Winners Cup 2007
- Bronze medal from European Championships 2008
- Gold medal from Summer Olympics 2008
- World Champion 2009
- European Champion 2010
- Hamburgs Sportler des Jahres 2009
- Gold medal from Summer Olympics 2012

=== As Coach ===
- Gold medal from Summer Olympics 2020
- European Champion 2024
- Silver medals at the 2023 World Men's Handball Championship
- Bronze medals at the 2025 World Men's Handball Championship

== Seasons for HSV Hamburg ==
Season	Club	League	Games	Goals	7-Meter	Besides 7-Meter
2002/03	HSV Hamburg	Bundesliga	10	34	1	33
2003/04	HSV Hamburg	Bundesliga	31	111	0	111
2004/05	HSV Hamburg	Bundesliga	34	130	0	130
2005/06	HSV Hamburg	Bundesliga	33	84	0	84
2006/07	HSV Hamburg	Bundesliga	34	90	0	90
2007/08	HSV Hamburg	Bundesliga	30	66	0	66
2008/09	HSV Hamburg	Bundesliga	31	59	0	59
2002–2009	Total	Bundesliga	203	574	1	573
