= Goran Stojanović (handballer, born 1966) =

Serbian handball player

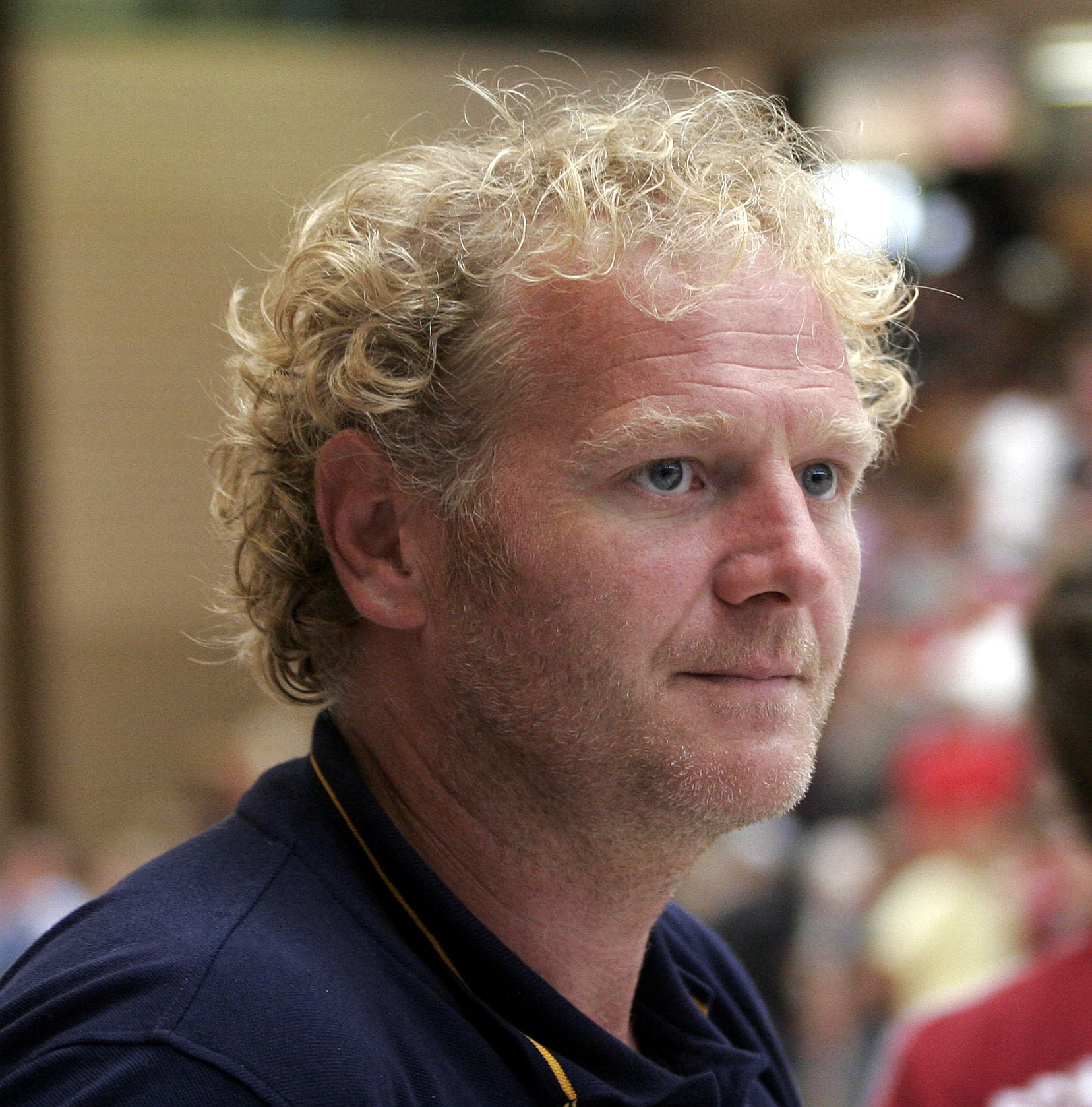
- Stojanović in 2007

Personal information
- Full name: Goran Stojanović
- Nationality: Serbian
- Born: 29 January 1966 (age 60) Kotor, SR Montenegro, SFR Yugoslavia
- Height: 1.91 m (6 ft 3 in)

Sport
- Sport: Handball
- Position: Goalkeeper

Senior clubs
- Years: Team
- 1985–1988: Crvena zvezda
- 1988–1991: Zagreb
- 1991–1992: Partizan
- 1992–1993: Mepamsa San Antonio
- 1993–1995: Conquense
- 1995–1996: Crvena zvezda
- 1996–1999: THW Kiel
- 1999–2002: VfL Bad Schwartau
- 2002–2007: HSV Hamburg
- 2011: SC DHfK Leipzig
National team
- Years: Team
- 1990–1992: Yugoslavia
- 1995–1997: FR Yugoslavia

Teams managed
- 2013–2016: AMTV Hamburg
Medal record
Men's handball
Representing Yugoslavia
Goodwill Games
Silver medal – second place	1990 Seattle	Team
Representing FR Yugoslavia
European Championship
Bronze medal – third place	1996 Spain	Team

Goran Stojanović (Serbian Cyrillic: Горан Стојановић; born 29 January 1966) is a Serbian handball coach and former player.

== Club career ==
Over the course of his career that spanned almost three decades, Stojanović, a goalkeeper, played for Crvena zvezda (two spells), Zagreb, Partizan, Mepamsa San Antonio, Conquense, THW Kiel, VfL Bad Schwartau, HSV Hamburg, and SC DHfK Leipzig. He won numerous trophies at club level, including the EHF Cup with THW Kiel in the 1997–98 season.

== International career ==
At international level, Stojanović represented Yugoslavia at the 1990 World Championship. He was also a member of the team that finished runners-up at the 1990 Goodwill Games, winning the silver medal. Later on, Stojanović competed for FR Yugoslavia, winning the bronze medal at the 1996 European Championship.

== Coaching career ==
In April 2013, Stojanović was appointed as head coach of AMTV Hamburg for the 2013–14 season.

== Honours ==
Zagreb

- Yugoslav Handball Championship: 1988–89, 1990–91
- Yugoslav Handball Cup: 1990–91

Crvena zvezda

- Handball Championship of FR Yugoslavia: 1995–96
- Handball Cup of FR Yugoslavia: 1995–96

THW Kiel

- Handball-Bundesliga: 1997–98, 1998–99
- DHB-Pokal: 1997–98, 1998–99
- DHB-Supercup: 1998
- EHF Cup: 1997–98

VfL Bad Schwartau

- DHB-Pokal: 2000–01

HSV Hamburg

- DHB-Pokal: 2005–06
- DHB-Supercup: 2006
- EHF Cup Winners' Cup: 2006–07
