= Thomas Knorr =

German handball player (born 1971)

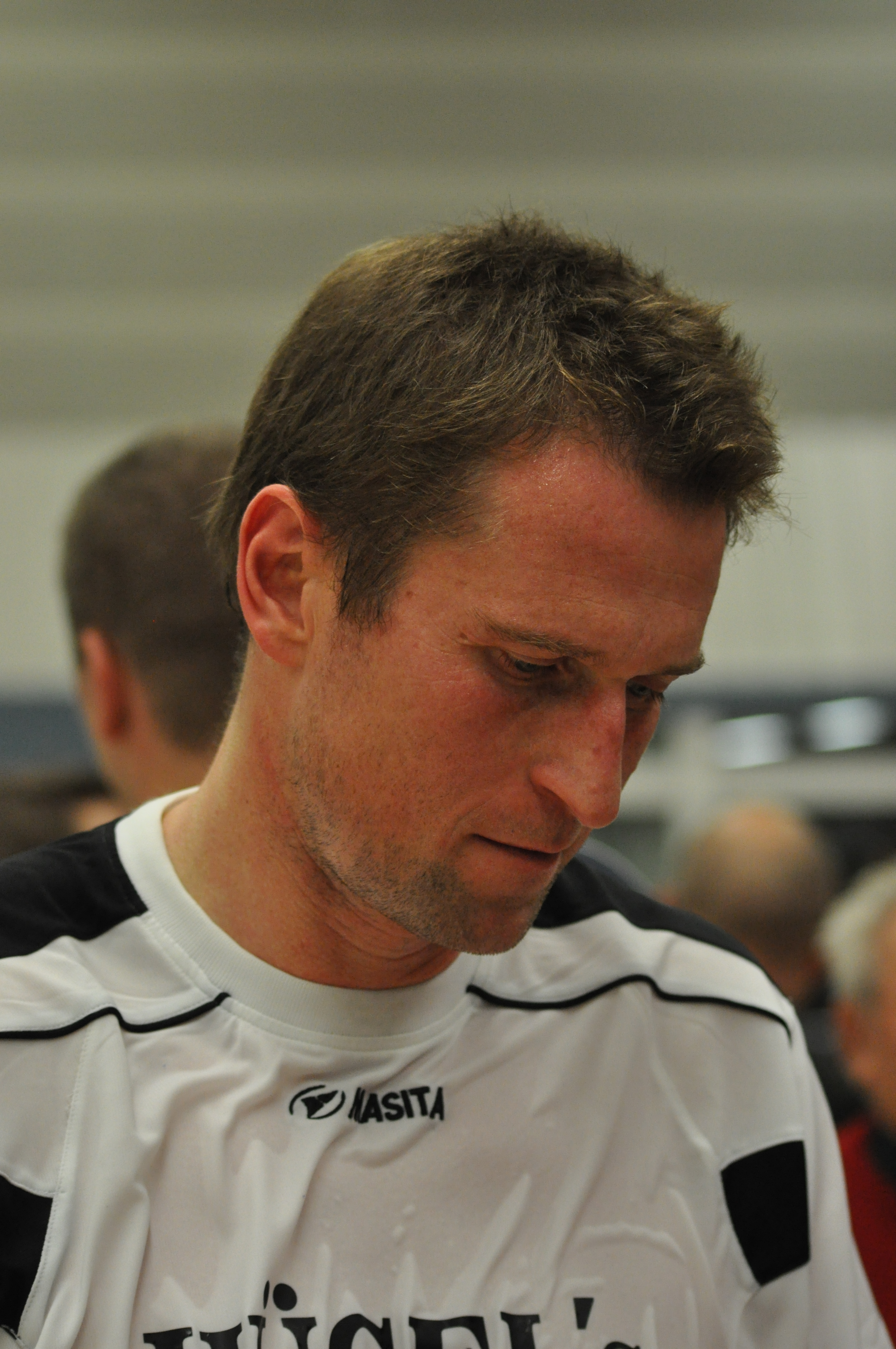
- Knorr in 2010

Personal information
- Nationality: German
- Born: 16 May 1971 (age 55) Lübeck, West Germany

Sport
- Sport: Handball
- Position: Left back

Senior clubs
- Years: Team
- 1988–1992: VfL Bad Schwartau
- 1992–1998: THW Kiel
- 1998–2001: SG Flensburg-Handewitt
- 2001–2002: SG VfL Bad Schwartau
- 2002–2007: HSV Hamburg
- 2007–2011: VfL Bad Schwartau
- 2012–2013: Preetzer TSV
- 2013–2014: SC Magdeburg
- 2014–2019: HSG Ostsee N/G
National team
Years	Team	Apps	(Gls)
1990-?	Germany	83	(199)

Thomas Knorr (born 16 May 1971) is a German retired handball player and handball coach. He competed in the men's tournament at the 1996 Summer Olympics.

His son, Juri Knorr is a professional handball player.

== Individual awards ==
- Top Scorer of the European Championship: 1996
