= Simen Muffetangen =

Norwegian handball player

Personal information
- Nationality: Norwegian
- Height: 190 cm (75 in)

Sport
- Sport: Handball
- Position: Left Back

Senior clubs
- Years: Team
- –: Kragerø IF
- –: Sandefjord TIF
- –: VfL Bad Schwartau
- –: HSV Hamburg
- 2003-2004: Aalborg Håndbold
National team
Years	Team	Apps	(Gls)
1989–1996	Norway	106	(370)

Teams managed
- 2004-2007: Kragerø IF

Simen Muffetangen (born 6 June 1971) is a Norwegian former handball player and coach.

A multiple times top scorer in the Norwegian league, his club achievements include winning the Norwegian cup and league with Sandefjord TIF, and the DHB-Pokal with VfL Bad Schwartau. He played more than one hundred matches for the Norwegian national team, including competing in the world championships.

== Career ==
Muffetangen made his debut on the Norwegian national team in 1989, and played 106 matches for the national team between 1989 and 1996. He participated at the 1993 World Men's Handball Championship.

In 1999 he won the Norwegian championship and cup double with Sandefjord TIF. He won the DHB-Pokal in 2001 with VfL Bad Schwartau.

He was in 1989, 1992 and 1993 the top scorer in the Norwegian top division. In 1989 he was named player of the year in the division.

He retired in 2004.

Muffetangen was awarded the Håndballstatuetten trophy from the Norwegian Handball Federation in 2013.

== Personal life ==
Muffetangen was born on 6 June 1971.

His son, Sondre, and Daughter, Tuva, are also handball players.
