= Morten Bjerre =

Danish handball player (born 1972)

Personal information
- Full name: Morten Bjerre
- Nationality: Danish
- Born: 22 May 1972 (age 54) Copenhagen, Denmark
- Height: 1.96 m (6 ft 5 in)

Sport
- Sport: Handball
- Position: Right back
- Current club: Retired

Senior clubs
- Years: Team
- -1996: Ajax København
- 1996-1997: SG VfL/BHW Hameln
- 1997-2000: SG Flensburg-Handewitt
- 2000-2003: THW Kiel
- 2003-2004: HSV Hamburg
- 2004-2011: Viborg HK
National team
Years	Team	Apps	(Gls)
1992–2005	Denmark	185	(432)

Morten Bjerre (born 22 May 1972) is a Danish retired handball player. During his long career, he has played for league rivals Ajax København, as well as German Bundesliga sides SG Flensburg-Handewitt, THW Kiel and HSV Hamburg.

He won the German championship as well as the EHF Cup with THW Kiel.

For many years, Bjerre was an important player at the Danish national handball team, and is noted for almost 200 appearances.

His daughter, Cecilie Bjerre, is also a professional handball player.
