= Pascal Hens =

German handball player (born 1980)

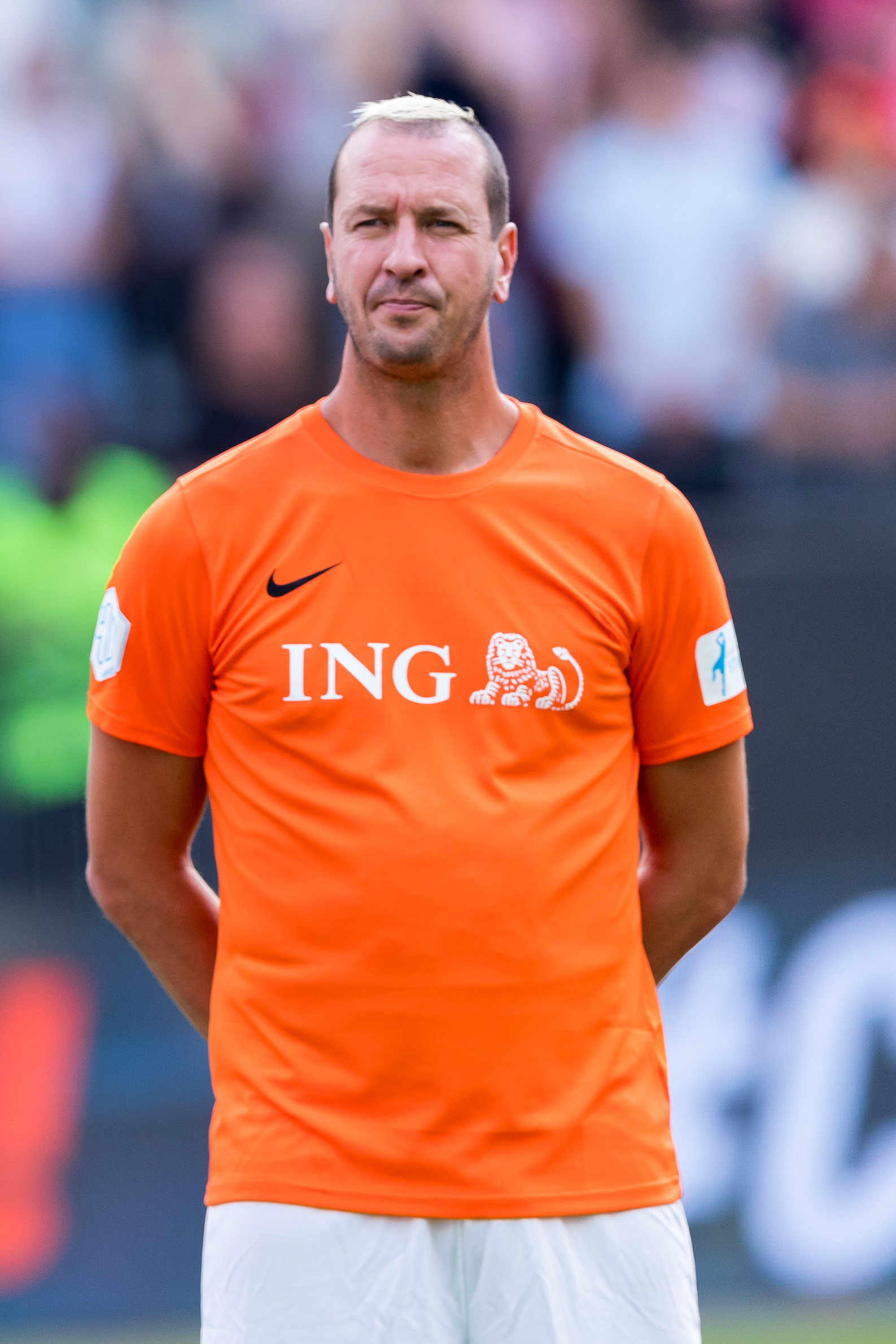
- Hens in 2022

Personal information
- Nationality: German
- Born: 26 March 1980 (age 46) Daun, West Germany
- Height: 2.03 m (6 ft 8 in)

Sport
- Sport: Handball
- Position: Left back

Youth career
- Years: Team
- 1986–1996: TG Kastel
- 1996–1998: SV Kostheim 1912

Senior clubs
- Years: Team
- 1998–1999: TuS Eintracht Wiesbaden
- 1999–2003: SG Wallau-Massenheim
- 2003–2016: HSV Hamburg
- 2016: HC Midtjylland
- 2016–2017: HBW Balingen-Weilstetten
National team
Years	Team	Apps	(Gls)
2001–2012	Germany	199	(565)
Medal record
Olympic Games
Silver medal – second place	2004 Athens	Team Competition
World Men's Handball Championship
Gold medal – first place	2007 Germany	Team competition
Silver medal – second place	2003 Portugal	Team competition
European Men's Handball Championship
Gold medal – first place	2004 Slovenia	Team competition
Silver medal – second place	2002 Sweden	Team competition

Pascal "Pommes" Hens (born 26 March 1980) is a former German team handball player and former World Champion. He received a silver medal at the 2004 Summer Olympics in Athens with the German national team. He is World Champion from 2007, and European champion from 2004. He also represented his native country at the 2008 Summer Olympics in Beijing, China.

== Career ==
Hens started playing handball at the age of 6 at TG Kastel. At 12 he joined SV Kostheim 1912. He played his first Bundesliga game on his 21st birthday in the 1999-2000 season for SG Wallau-Massenheim, where he scored 5 goals in a 29-18 win. In 2000 he signed his first professional contract at the club. In March 2001 he made his debut for the Germany national team. In 2003 he joined HSV Hamburg, while drawing interest from THW Kiel, TBV Lemgo and SC Magdeburg. In 2008 he was named Hamburg sportsperson of the year. In October 2015 he played his 500th game for Hamburg. He won the EHF Cup Winner's Cup in 2007 and the EHF Champions League in 2013 with HSV Hamburg.

When the club went bankrupt in February 2016 he joined Danish team HC Midtjylland for the rest of the season. The following summer he returned to Germany to join HBW Balingen-Weilstetten. After the 2016-17 he retired.

=== Career statistics ===
Season(s)	Team	League	Games	Goals	Penalty goals	Outfield goals
2000–02	SG Wallau/Massenheim	Bundesliga	68	245	12	233
2002/03	SG Wallau/Massenheim	Bundesliga	25	113	-	113
2003/04	HSV Hamburg	Bundesliga	26	106	-	106
2004/05	HSV Hamburg	Bundesliga	14	54	-	54
2005/06	HSV Hamburg	Bundesliga	34	159	1	158
2006/07	HSV Hamburg	Bundesliga	31	142	-	142
2007/08	HSV Hamburg	Bundesliga	33	158	-	158
2008/09	HSV Hamburg	Bundesliga	21	81	-	81
2009/10	HSV Hamburg	Bundesliga	30	93	-	93
2010/11	HSV Hamburg	Bundesliga	31	84	-	84
2011/12	HSV Hamburg	Bundesliga	33	103	-	103
2012/13	HSV Hamburg	Bundesliga	28	88	-	88
2013/14	HSV Hamburg	Bundesliga	28	69	-	69
2014/15	HSV Hamburg	Bundesliga	35	86	-	86
2016/17	HBW Balingen-Weilstetten	Bundesliga	16	19	-	19
2000–2017	Total	Bundesliga	435	1600	13	1587

== Post-playing career ==
After his playinig career he has worked as a sports commentated at Eurosport and Dyn.

He has also been involved in the German anti-racism project Respekt! Kein Platz für Rassismus.
