= Jacob Lassen =

Danish handball player (born 1995)

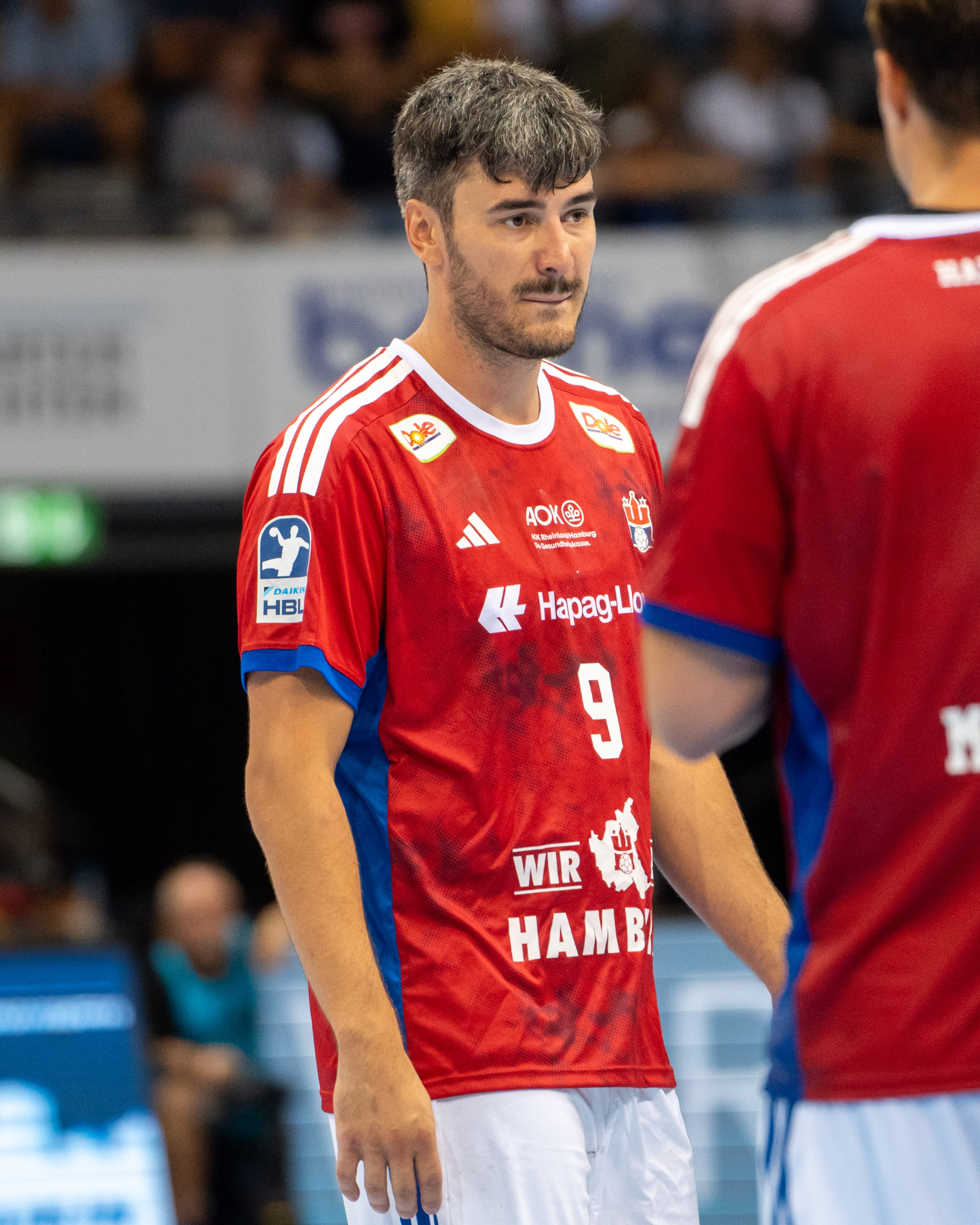

Personal information
- Full name: Jacob Arenth Lassen
- Nationality: Danish
- Born: 11 September 1995 (age 31) Randers, Denmark
- Height: 1.97 m (6 ft 6 in)

Sport
- Sport: Handball
- Position: Right back
- Current club: HSV Hamburg
- Number: 9

Senior clubs
- Years: Team
- 2014–2016: Randers HH
- 2016–2022: Bjerringbro-Silkeborg Håndbold
- 2022–2026: HSV Hamburg
- 2026–: Rhein-Neckar Löwen
National team
Years	Team	Apps	(Gls)
2021–	Denmark	14	(24)
- Updated on 15 July 2025

Jacob Lassen (born 11 September 1995) is a Danish handball player for HSV Hamburg and the Danish national team.

== Career ==
Lassen started his career at the local club Randers HH. In 2016 he won the Danish 1st Division. He then signed for Bjerringbro-Silkeborg Håndbold. In the 2017-18 and 2020-21 seasons he finished 2nd in the Danish league with BSH. In the 2022-23 season he was included in the Danish League all-star team.

He made his debut on the Danish national team on 28 April 2021, against Switzerland.

On 26 October 2021, it was announced that Lassen had signed a contract with German HSV Hamburg.

From the 2026–27 season he will join Rhein-Neckar Löwen.
