= Branko Kokir =

Serbian handball player (born 1974)

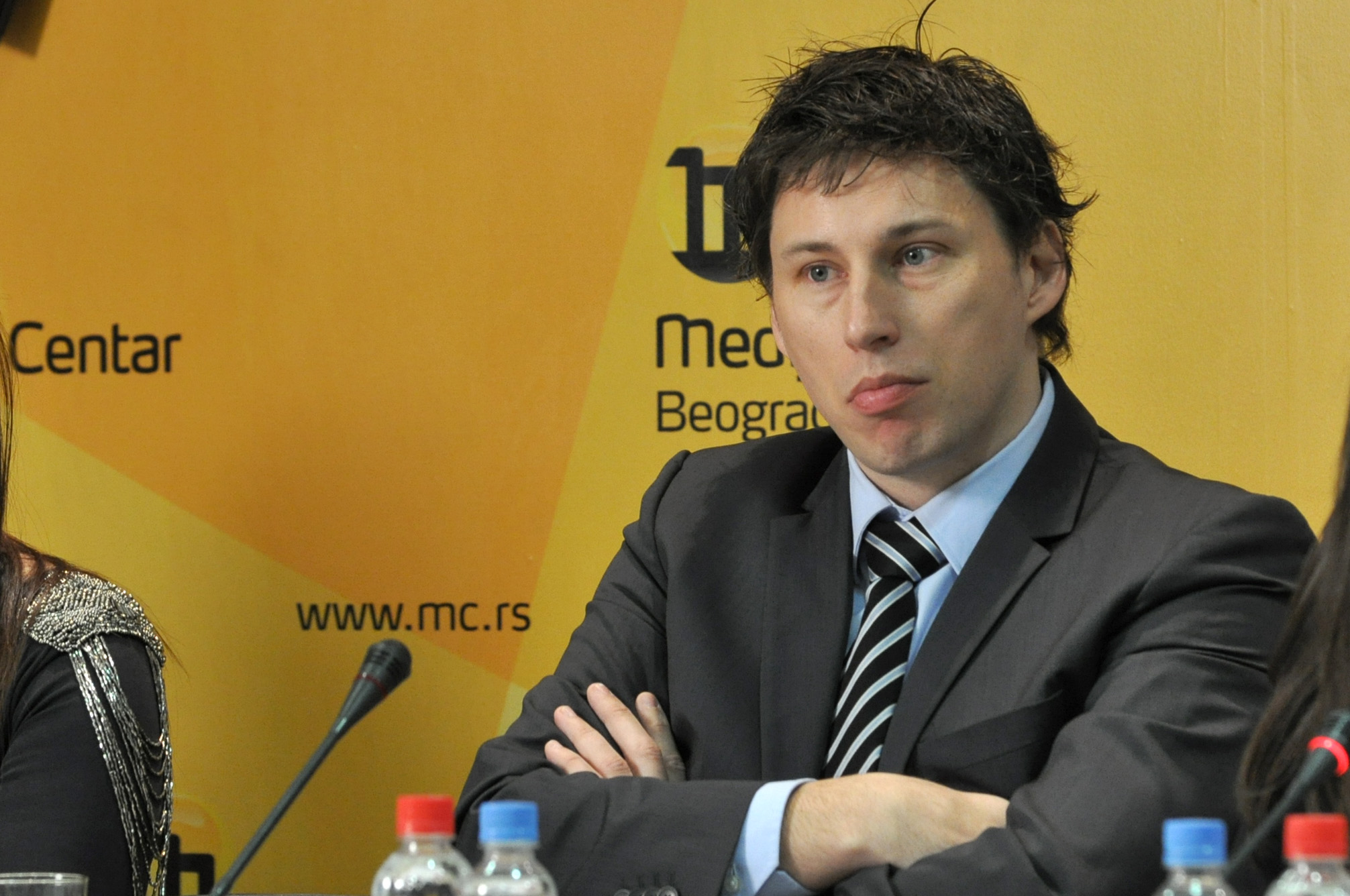
- Kokir in 2013

Personal information
- Full name: Branko Kokir
- Nationality: Serbian
- Born: 28 August 1974 (age 52) Karlovac, SFR Yugoslavia
- Height: 1.92 m (6 ft 4 in)

Sport
- Sport: Handball
- Position: Left back

Youth career
- Years: Team
- –: Partizan

Senior clubs
- Years: Team
- 1993–2000: Partizan
- 2000–2004: SG Willstätt/Schutterwald
- 2004–2005: Grasshoppers
- 2005–2006: HSV Hamburg
- 2006–2009: TuS Nettelstedt-Lübbecke
National team
- Years: Team
- 1998–2004: Serbia and Montenegro
Medal record
Men's handball
Representing FR Yugoslavia
World Championship
Bronze medal – third place	1999 Egypt	Team
Bronze medal – third place	2001 France	Team
World University Championship
Gold medal – first place	1998 Novi Sad	Team

Branko Kokir (Serbian Cyrillic: Бранко Кокир; born 28 August 1974) is a Serbian former handball player.

== Club career ==
Kokir made his professional debut with Partizan and spent seven seasons with the club (1993–2000). He later moved abroad and played for SG Willstätt/Schutterwald (2000–2004), Grasshoppers (2004–2005), HSV Hamburg (2005–2006) and TuS Nettelstedt-Lübbecke (2006–2009).

== International career ==
Kokir represented Serbia and Montenegro (known as FR Yugoslavia until 2003) in international tournaments, winning two bronze medals at the World Championships (1999 and 2001). He also participated in two European Championships (1998 and 2004). Previously, Kokir won the gold medal at the 1998 World University Championship.

== Honours ==
Partizan

- Handball Championship of FR Yugoslavia: 1993–94, 1994–95, 1998–99
- Handball Cup of FR Yugoslavia: 1993–94, 1997–98

HSV Hamburg

- DHB-Pokal: 2005–06
