= Mohamed El-Tayar =

Egyptian handball player

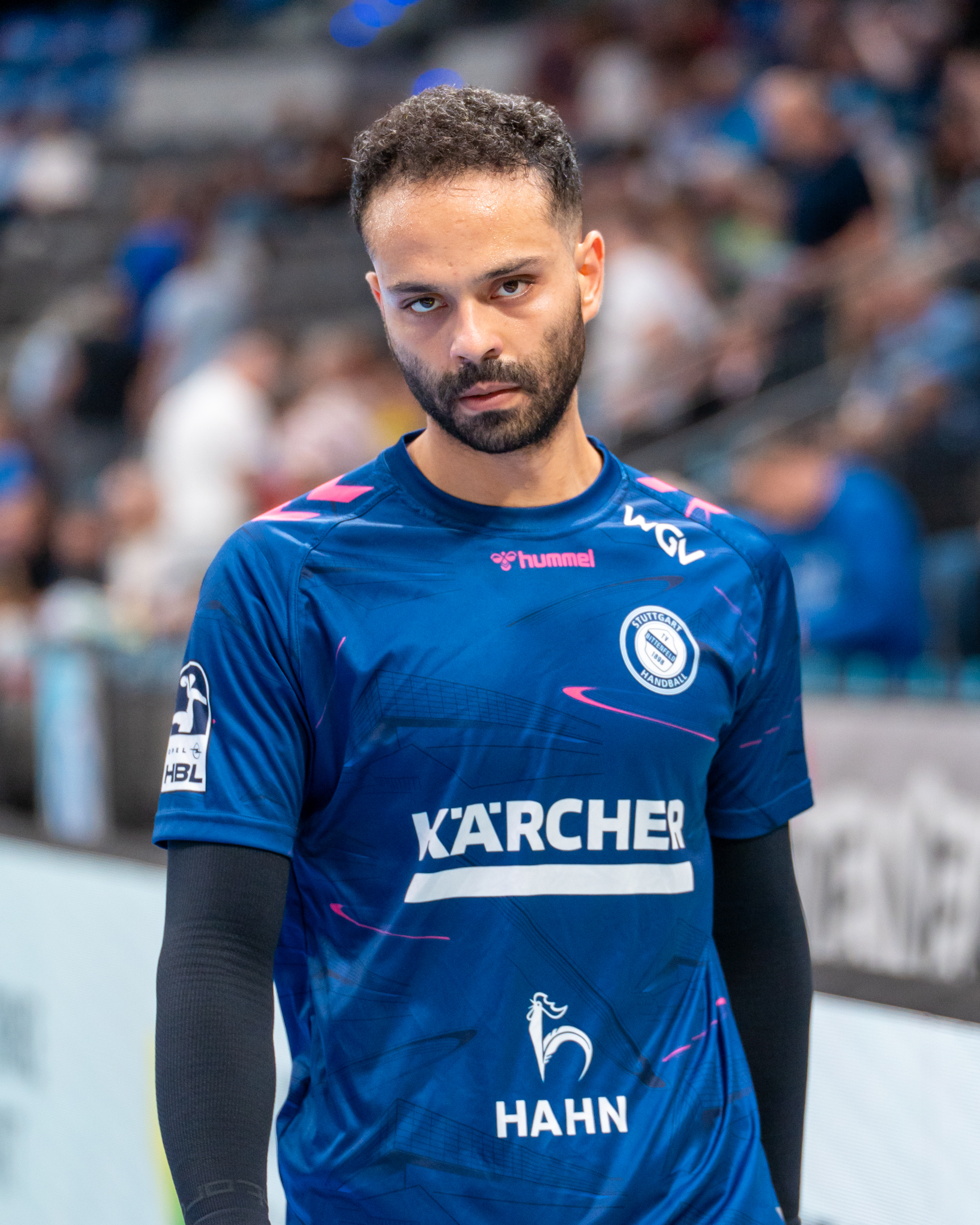
- Mohamed El-Tayar 2026

Personal information
- Full name: Mohamed 'Assam El-Tayar
- Nationality: Egyptian
- Born: 7 April 1996 (age 30)
- Height: 1.92 m (6 ft 4 in)

Sport
- Sport: Handball
- Position: Goalkeeper
- Current club: Handball Sport Verein Hamburg
- Number: 12

Youth career
- Years: Team
- –2016: Al Ahly

Senior clubs
- Years: Team
- 2016–2022: Al Ahly
- 2022–2023: SC DHfK Leipzig Handball
- 2023–2024: HBW Balingen-Weilstetten
- 2024–: Handball Sport Verein Hamburg
National team
Years	Team	Apps	(Gls)
–	Egypt	73	(1)
Medal record
African Championship
Gold medal – first place	2022 Egypt
Gold medal – first place	2026 Rwanda
Mediterranean Games
Silver medal – second place	2022 Oran	Team
Summer Youth Olympics
Silver medal – second place	2014 Nanjing	Team

Mohamed 'Assam El-Tayar (Arabic: محمد عصام الطيار; born 7 April 1996) is an Egyptian handball player for Handball Sport Verein Hamburg and the Egyptian national team.

He studies Energy and renewable energy at Faculty of engineering Ain Shams University.

He represented Egypt at the World Men's Handball Championship in 2019, and 2021.
