= Stefan Schröder =

German team handball player (born 1981)

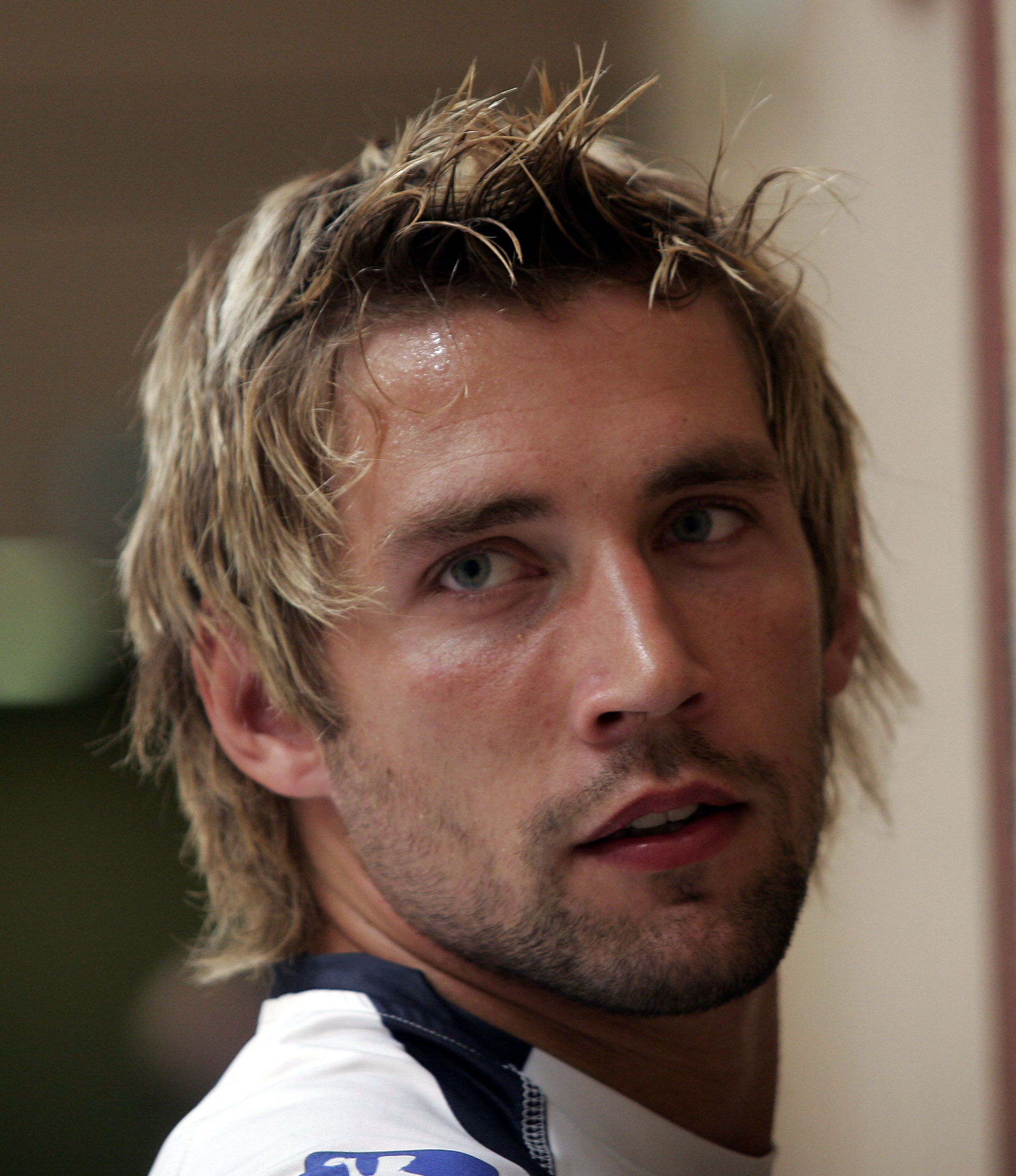
- Stefan Schröder with HSV Hamburg in 2007.

Personal information
- Nationality: German
- Born: 17 July 1981 (age 45) Schwerin, Germany
- Height: 183 cm (72 in)

Sport
- Sport: Handball
- Position: Right wing
- Current club: Retired

Youth career
- Years: Team
- –: SV Post Schwerin
- 1999-2000: SG Flensburg-Handewitt

Senior clubs
- Years: Team
- 2000-2004: SG Flensburg-Handewitt
- 2004-2005: HSG Düsseldorf
- 2005-2019: HSV Hamburg
National team
Years	Team	Apps	(Gls)
2002-2010	Germany	49	(99)
Medal record
Representing Germany
Men's handball
World championship
Gold medal – first place	2007 Germany	Team Competition

Stefan Schröder (born 17 July 1981 in Schwerin) is a German former team handball player. He is the World Champion of 2007 playing with the German national team. He participated on the German team that finished 4th at the 2008 European Men's Handball Championship.

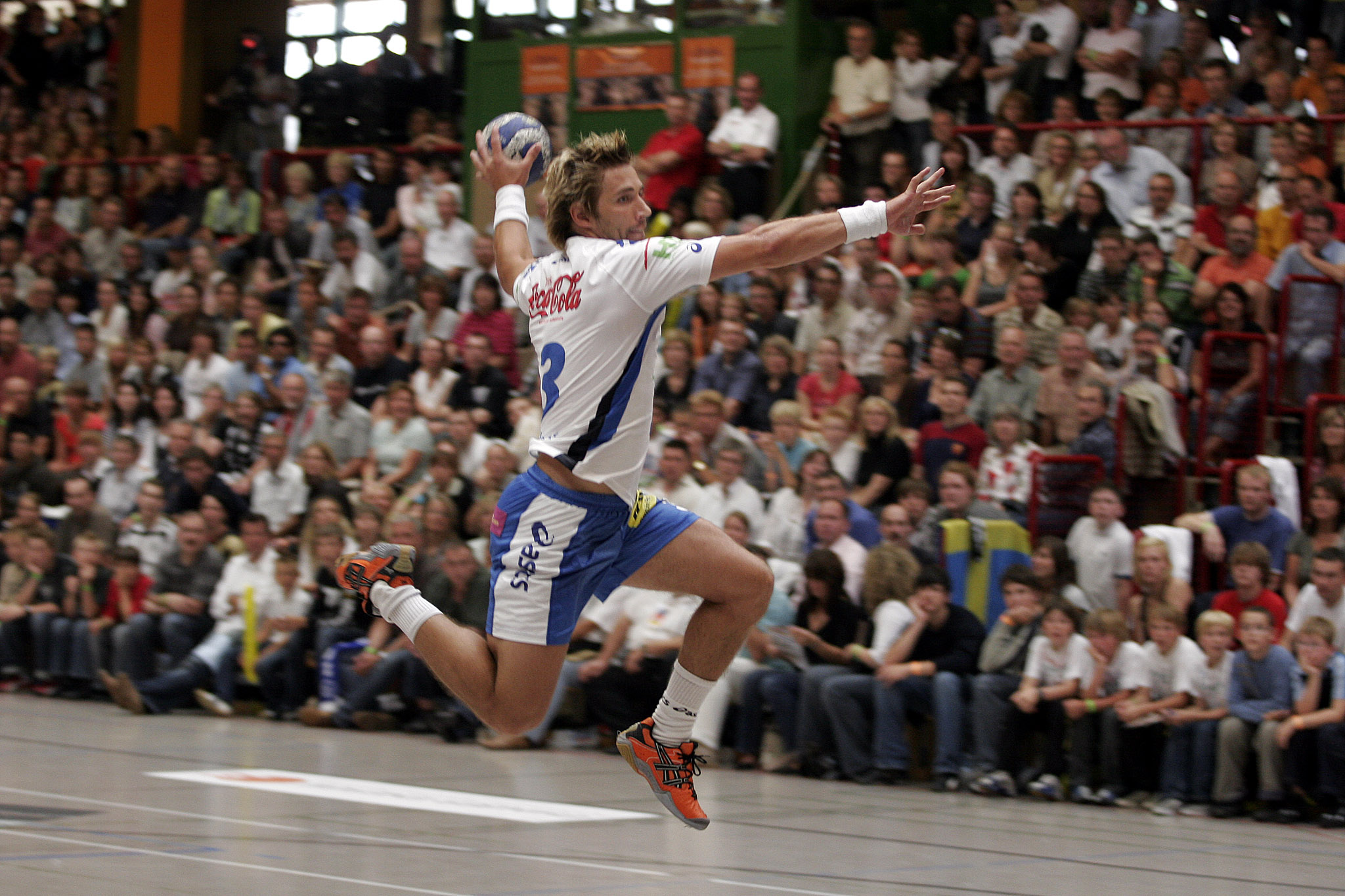

== Club career ==
Stefan Schröder started playing handball at SV Post Schwerin. In 1999 he joined the youth team of SG Flensburg-Handewitt, where he would break through on the first team a year later. In 2001 he won his first title, when Flensburg-Handewitt won the EHF Cup Winners' Cup beating Ademar Leon in the final.

In 2004 he joined HSG Düsseldorf.

Only a year later in 2005 he joined HSV Hamburg. Schröder won the EHF Cup Winner's Cup in 2007 with the German club HSV Hamburg.

On June 6th 2009 he beat the Bundesliga record for most goals scored in a single game, when he scored 21 goals. Herbert Lübking's record of 20 had stood for more than 40 years at that point.

He retired as a player in 2017, but unretired briefly in August 2018 because HSV Hamburg had many injured players.

== Post Playing Career ==
Between February 2018 and March 2024 he was the Vice president for youth sport in Hamburger Handball-Verband.

In the 2020-21 season he coach the Youth A-team at HSV Hamburg.. From 2021 to 2024 he coached HSV Hamburg's B-team.
