= Azat Valiullin =

Russian handball player

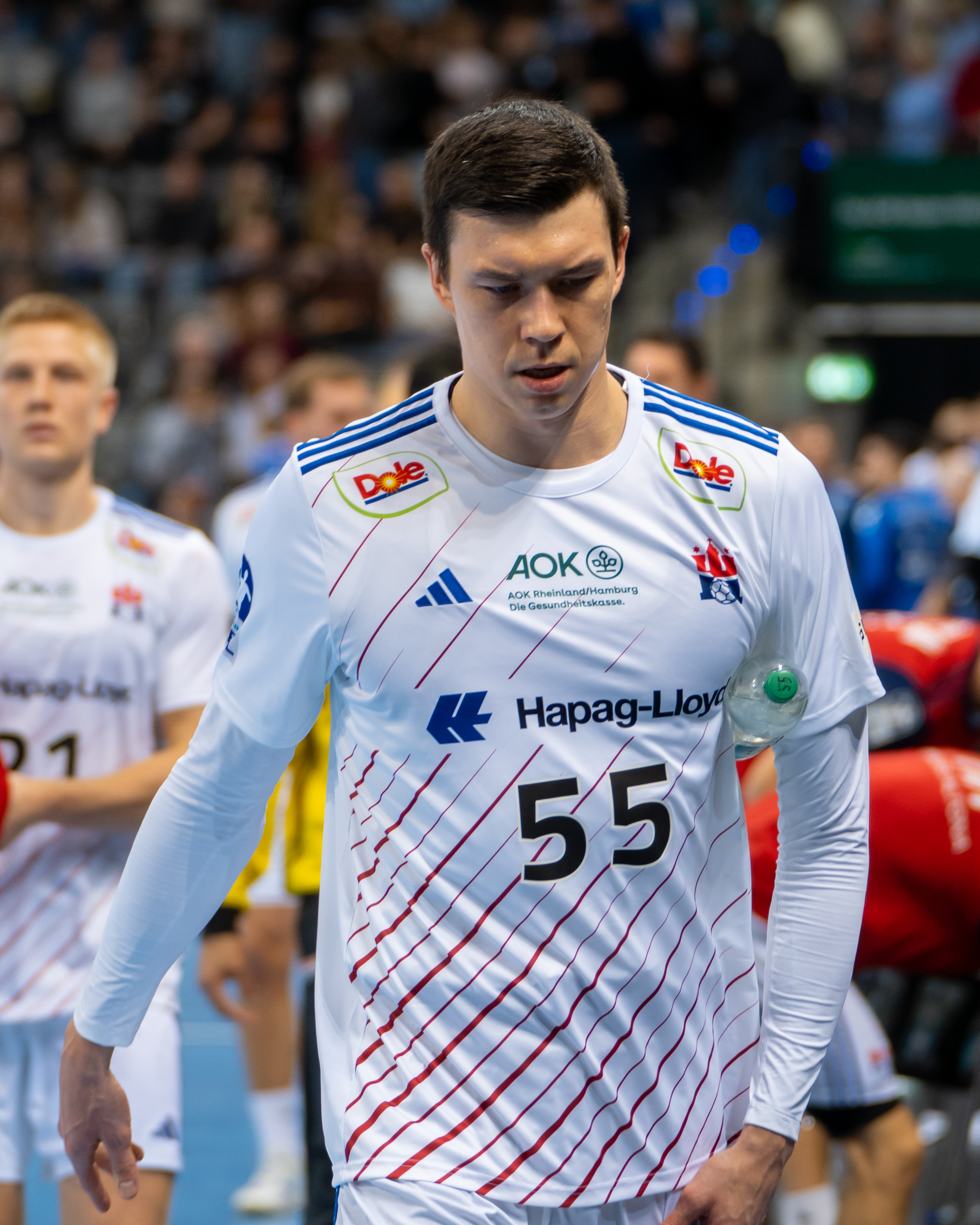

Personal information
- Nationality: Russian
- Born: 1 September 1990 (age 36) Chelyabinsk, Russia
- Height: 2.07 m (6 ft 9 1/2 in)

Sport
- Sport: Handball
- Position: Left back
- Current club: HSV Hamburg
- Number: 55
National team
Years	Team	Apps	(Gls)
–	Russia	12	(30)

Azat Valiullin (born 1 September 1990) is a Russian handball player for HSV Hamburg and the Russian national team.

He participated at the 2017 World Men's Handball Championship.
