= Dan Beutler =

Swedish handballer (born 1977)

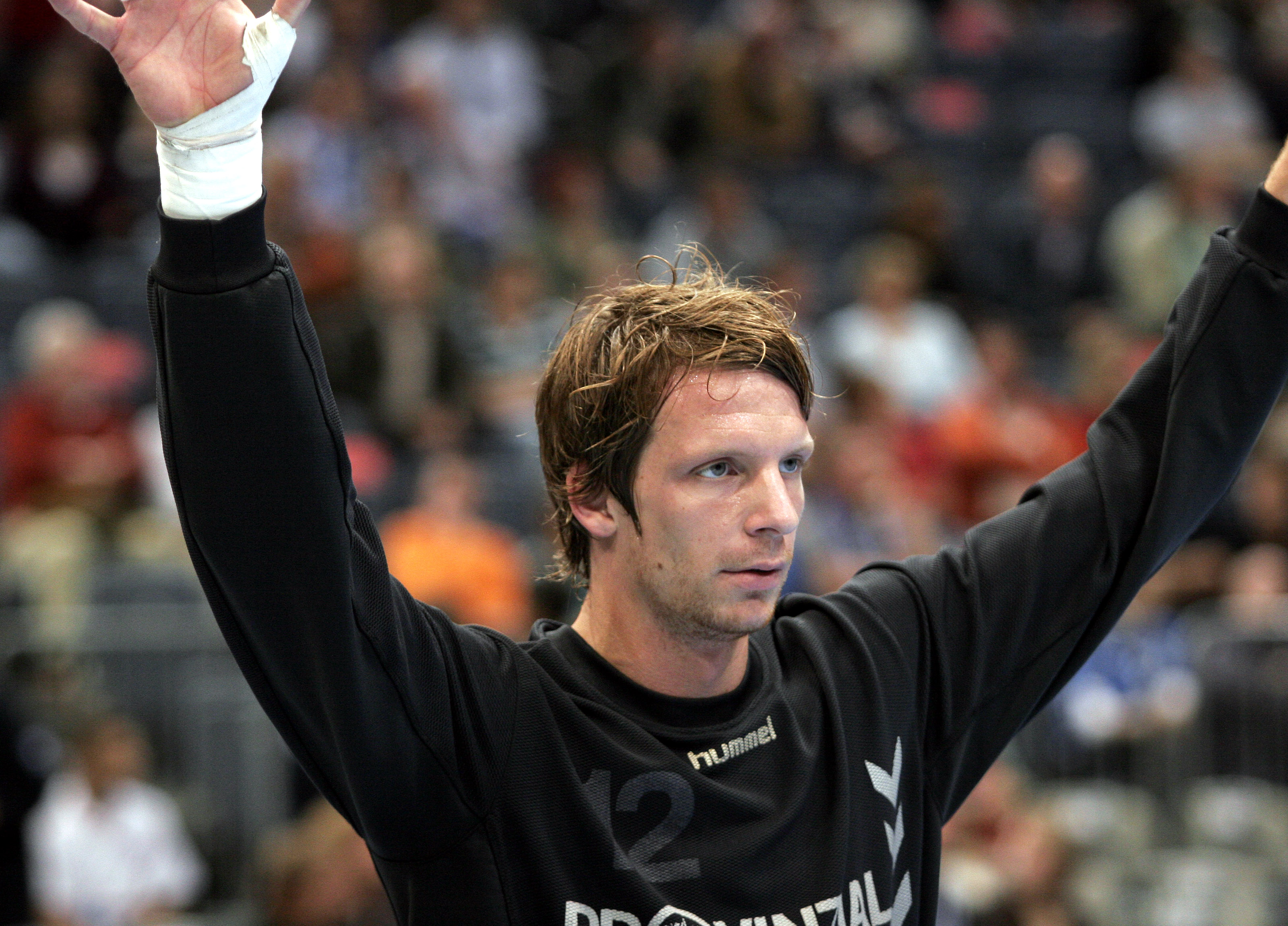

Personal information
- Nationality: Swedish
- Born: 7 October 1977 (age 49) Hallstahammar, Sweden
- Height: 1.93 m (6 ft 4 in)

Sport
- Sport: Handball
- Position: Goalkeeper
- Current club: HK Malmö
- Number: 1

Youth career
- Years: Team
- –1995: Hallstahammar SK

Senior clubs
- Years: Team
- 1995–1999: Irsta HF
- 1999–2002: IFK Ystad
- 2002–2003: Redbergslids IK
- 2003–2011: SG Flensburg-Handewitt
- 2011–2013: HSV Hamburg
- 2013: El Jaish SC
- 2013–2014: IFK Kristianstad
- 2014: Samen Al-Hojaj
- 2015: TBV Lemgo
- 2015–2019: HK Malmö
- 2020–2022: HK Malmö
National team
| Years | Team | Apps | (Gls) |
| – | Sweden | 71 | (0) |

Dan Beutler (born 10 October 1977) is a Swedish handballer, who has previously played for German side clubs SG Flensburg-Handewitt and HSV Hamburg. Later he played for TBV Lemgo.

In 2019 he had planned a transfer to Danish club GOG Håndbold, but it fell through after Beutler tested positive for cocaine. Following a doping ban, he rejoined HK Malmö in February 2020. He retired after the 2021-22 season.
