= Handball Sport Verein Hamburg =

German handball club

Handball Hamburg
- Full name: Handball Sport Verein Hamburg e.V.
- Short name: HSV Hamburg
- Founded: 1999; 27 years ago
- Arena: Sporthalle Hamburg; Barclays Arena
- Capacity: 4,144; 13,000
- President: Marc Dieter Evermann
- Head coach: Torsten Jansen
- League: Handball-Bundesliga
- 2025–26: 10th of 18
- Club colours
Home	Away

Handball Sport Verein Hamburg is a professional handball club from Germany, located in Hamburg. Currently, Handball Hamburg competes in the Handball-Bundesliga. The full name in German is Handball Sport Verein Hamburg e.V. but the club has traditionally been called HSV Handball, HSV Hamburg or simply HSV. Their main rivals are THW Kiel and SG Flensburg-Handewitt.

Location of Handball Sport Verein Hamburg

== History ==
Handball Sport Verein Hamburg is a merger of the former handball clubs VfL Bad Schwartau and HSV Lübeck, which joined forces in 1999 under the name Handball Sport Verein Lübeck. In 2002, they were moved to Hamburg for growth and renamed. Later VfL Lübeck-Schwartau was formed from 2nd team of VfL Bad Schwartau, and they now play in the 2nd Bundesliga. Although locally known as HSV Hamburg, the club is not part of the Hamburger Sportverein and does not have the right to use their logo and abbreviation for promotional purposes. The club notably won a EHF Champions League in 2013 and a Handball-Bundesliga in 2011.

On September 12th, 2014 the team broke the world record for most spectators at a handball match with in a match against Rhein-Neckar Löwen with 44,189 spectators.

On 20 January 2016, their license was revoked due to irregularities and, as a result, Handball Hamburg was not authorized to participate in either the first or second handball Bundesliga in the 2016/17 season. As a result, the club was relaunched with a new coat of arms, colors and a new image, from HSV Hamburg to Handball Sport Verein Hamburg; although the official name remained unchanged. The club returned to the Handball-Bundesliga in the 2021–22 season.

On 3 May 2024, it was announced that HSV Hamburg did not get the license for the next season, which would see them relegated. This was appealed by Hamburg. Hamburg was given the licence due to an error in the procedure on 31 May with a specific condition and an economic deposit.

== Crest, colours, supporters ==
=== Naming history ===
Name	Period
HSV Lübeck	1999–2002
HSV Handball	2002–2016
Handball Sport Verein Hamburg	2016–present

=== Club crest ===
Logo used between 1999 and 2016

Official logo since 2016

=== Kits ===
HOME
2011–12	2013–14	2014–15	2021–22

AWAY
2013–14	2021–22

== Accomplishments ==
- Handball-Bundesliga:
  - Gold: 2011
- 2. Handball-Bundesliga:
  - Gold: 2021
- DHB-Pokal:
  - Gold: 2006, 2010
- DHB-Supercup:
  - Gold: 2004, 2006, 2009, 2010
- EHF Champions League:
  - Gold: 2013
- EHF Cup Winner's Cup:
  - Gold: 2007

== Team ==
=== Current squad ===
Squad for the 2025–26 season

HSV Hamburg

Goalkeepers

- 12 (Egypt) Mohamed El-Tayar
- 16 (Norway) Robin Paulsen Haug

Left wingers

- 17 (Netherlands) Kaj Geenen
- 51 (Denmark) Casper Ulrich Mortensen

Right wingers

- 21 (Denmark) Frederik Bo Andersen
- 31 (Germany) Levin Unbehaun

Line players

- 4 (Denmark) Andreas Magaard
- 13 (Germany) Niklas Weller
- 19 (Germany) Maximilian Botta
- 42 (Germany) Jan Schmidt

Left backs

- 15 (Germany) Dominik Axmann
- 20 (Germany) Ben Levermann
- 23 (Iceland) Einar Ólafsson
- 55 (Russia) Azat Valiullin

Centre Backs

- 6 (Austria) Elias Kofler
- 11 (Denmark) Nicolaj Jørgensen
- 33 (Germany) Moritz Sauter

Right backs

- 5 (Denmark) Oliver Norlyk
- 9 (Denmark) Jacob Lassen

=== Technical staff ===
- Head coach: (Germany) Torsten Jansen
- Assistant coach: (Croatia) Blaženko Lacković
- Athletic Trainer: (Germany) Philipp Winterhoff
- Physiotherapist: (Germany) Christina Dressel
- Club doctor: (Germany) Dr. Daniel Briem

=== Transfers ===
Transfers for the 2026–27 season

Joining

- (Norway) Martin Hovde (LP) from (Norway) Kolstad Håndball
- (Norway) Nicolai Daling (RB) from (Norway) Bergen Håndball
- (Bosnia and Herzegovina) Alem Hadžić (CB) from (North Macedonia) RK Eurofarm Pelister
- (Germany) Leon Nowottny (GK) from (Germany) THW Kiel
- (Germany) Noah Beyer (LW) from (Germany) Bergischer HC
- (Germany) Jan Schmidt (LP) from (Germany) TSV Bayer Dormagen
- (Egypt) Mahmoud El-Shobaky (LB) back from loan at (Germany) VfL Lübeck-Schwartau

Leaving

- (Denmark) Casper Ulrich Mortensen (LW) to (Denmark) HC København
- (Denmark) Jacob Lassen (RB) to (Germany) Rhein-Neckar Löwen
- (Denmark) Andreas Magaard (P) to (Denmark) GOG Håndbold
- (Egypt) Mohamed El-Tayar (GK) to (Germany) TVB Stuttgart
- (Germany) Niklas Weller (LP) (retires)
- (Germany) Maximilian Botta (LP) on loan at (Germany) VfL Lübeck-Schwartau
- (Germany) Christopher Welter (CB) on loan at (Germany) VfL Lübeck-Schwartau
- (Germany) Ben Levermann (LB) on loan at (Germany) VfL Fredenbeck

=== Transfer History ===
Transfers for the 2025–26 season

Joining

- (Austria) Elias Kofler (CB) from (Germany) 1. VfL Potsdam
- (Netherlands) Kaj Geenen (LW) from (Germany) VfL Lübeck-Schwartau
- (Iceland) Einar Ólafsson (LB) from (Denmark) Fredericia HK
- (Denmark) Nicolaj Jørgensen (CB) from (Denmark) SønderjyskE Herrehåndbold
- (Denmark) Oliver Norlyk (RB) from (Denmark) KIF Kolding
- (Russia) Azat Valiullin (LB) from (Germany) GWD Minden
- (Egypt) Mahmoud El-Shobaky (LB) from (Egypt) Heliopolis Sporting Club

Leaving

- (Hungary) Zoran Ilić (RB) to (Poland) Wisła Płock
- (Russia) Azat Valiullin (LB) to (Germany) GWD Minden
- (Germany) Leif Tissier (CB) to (Germany) TSV Hannover-Burgdorf
- (Germany) Alexander Hartwig (LW) to (Germany) VfL Lübeck-Schwartau
- (Germany) Finn Knaack (GK) on loan at (Germany) TUSEM Essen
- (Egypt) Mahmoud El-Shobaky (LB) on loan at (Germany) VfL Lübeck-Schwartau

== Previous squads ==
2012–2013 Team
Shirt No	Nationality	Player	Birth Date	Position
1	Germany	Johannes Bitter	2 September 1982 (age 44)	Goalkeeper
2	Germany	Michael Kraus	28 September 1983 (age 43)	Central Back
3	Germany	Stefan Schröder	17 July 1981 (age 45)	Right Winger
4	Croatia	Domagoj Duvnjak	1 June 1988 (age 38)	Central Back
5	Germany	Torsten Jansen	23 December 1976 (age 49)	Left Winger
6	Croatia	Blaženko Lacković	25 December 1980 (age 45)	Left Back
7	Germany	Matthias Flohr	29 March 1982 (age 44)	Left Winger
9	Croatia	Igor Vori	20 September 1980 (age 46)	Line Player
11	Bosnia and Herzegovina	Enid Tahirović	22 July 1972 (age 54)	Goalkeeper
12	FranceGermany	Max-Henri Herrmann	24 February 1994 (age 32)	Goalkeeper
18	Denmark	Hans Lindberg	1 August 1981 (age 45)	Right Winger
19	Serbia	Stefan Terzić	17 May 1994 (age 32)	Right Back
20	Germany	Robert Schulze	14 June 1991 (age 35)	Left Winger
21	Sweden	Andreas Nilsson	12 April 1990 (age 36)	Line Player
22	Poland	Marcin Lijewski	21 September 1977 (age 49)	Right Back
23	Germany	Pascal Hens	26 March 1980 (age 46)	Left Back
24	Sweden	Fredrik Petersen	27 August 1983 (age 43)	Left Winger
66	Sweden	Oscar Carlén	11 May 1988 (age 38)	Right Back
77	Sweden	Dan Beutler	7 October 1977 (age 49)	Goalkeeper

2010–2011 Team
Shirt No	Nationality	Player	Birth Date	Position
1	Germany	Johannes Bitter	2 September 1982 (age 44)	Goalkeeper
2	Germany	Michael Kraus	28 September 1983 (age 43)	Central Back
3	Germany	Stefan Schröder	17 July 1981 (age 45)	Right Winger
4	Croatia	Domagoj Duvnjak	1 June 1988 (age 38)	Central Back
5	Germany	Torsten Jansen	23 December 1976 (age 49)	Left Winger
6	Croatia	Blaženko Lacković	25 December 1980 (age 45)	Left Back
7	Germany	Matthias Flohr	29 March 1982 (age 44)	Left Winger
9	Croatia	Igor Vori	20 September 1980 (age 46)	Line Player
12	Sweden	Per Sandström	11 January 1981 (age 45)	Goalkeeper
14	France	Bertrand Gille	24 March 1978 (age 48)	Line Player
15	France	Guillaume Gille	12 July 1976 (age 50)	Central Back
18	Denmark	Hans Lindberg	1 August 1981 (age 45)	Right Winger
19	Poland	Krzysztof Lijewski	7 July 1983 (age 43)	Right Back
22	Poland	Marcin Lijewski	21 September 1977 (age 49)	Right Back
23	Germany	Pascal Hens	26 March 1980 (age 46)	Left Back
27	Germany	Marcel Schliedermann	2 January 1991 (age 35)	Central Back

2009–2010 Team
Shirt No	Nationality	Player	Birth Date	Position
1	Germany	Johannes Bitter	2 September 1982 (age 44)	Goalkeeper
3	Germany	Stefan Schröder	17 July 1981 (age 45)	Right Winger
4	Croatia	Domagoj Duvnjak	1 June 1988 (age 38)	Central Back
5	Germany	Torsten Jansen	23 December 1976 (age 49)	Left Winger
6	Croatia	Blaženko Lacković	25 December 1980 (age 45)	Left Back
7	Germany	Matthias Flohr	29 March 1982 (age 44)	Left Winger
9	Croatia	Igor Vori	20 September 1980 (age 46)	Line Player
10	UkraineGermany	Oleg Velyky	1 January 1977 (age 49)	Left Back
12	Sweden	Per Sandström	11 January 1981 (age 45)	Goalkeeper
14	France	Bertrand Gille	24 March 1978 (age 48)	Line Player
15	France	Guillaume Gille	12 July 1976 (age 50)	Central Back
16	Germany	Chrischa Hannawald	4 February 1971 (age 55)	Goalkeeper
17	Sweden	Nicklas Grundsten	1 October 1983 (age 43)	Line Player
18	Denmark	Hans Lindberg	1 August 1981 (age 45)	Right Winger
19	Poland	Krzysztof Lijewski	7 July 1983 (age 43)	Right Back
22	Poland	Marcin Lijewski	21 September 1977 (age 49)	Right Back
23	Germany	Pascal Hens	26 March 1980 (age 46)	Left Back
27	Germany	Marcel Schliedermann	2 January 1991 (age 35)	Central Back

2008–2009 Team
Shirt No	Nationality	Player	Birth Date	Position
1	Germany	Johannes Bitter	2 September 1982 (age 44)	Goalkeeper
3	Germany	Stefan Schröder	17 July 1981 (age 45)	Right Winger
4	Germany	Arne Niemeyer	8 November 1981 (age 44)	Central Back
5	Germany	Torsten Jansen	23 December 1976 (age 49)	Left Winger
6	Croatia	Blaženko Lacković	25 December 1980 (age 45)	Left Back
7	Germany	Matthias Flohr	29 March 1982 (age 44)	Left Winger
9	Germany	Jan Schult	22 September 1986 (age 40)	Left Back
10	UkraineGermany	Oleg Velyky	1 January 1977 (age 49)	Left Back
11	Russia	Dmitri Torgovanov	5 January 1972 (age 54)	Line Player
12	Sweden	Per Sandström	11 January 1981 (age 45)	Goalkeeper
13	Germany	Heiko Grimm	18 November 1977 (age 48)	Central Back
14	France	Bertrand Gille	24 March 1978 (age 48)	Line Player
15	France	Guillaume Gille	12 July 1976 (age 50)	Central Back
17	Sweden	Nicklas Grundsten	1 October 1983 (age 43)	Line Player
18	Denmark	Hans Lindberg	1 August 1981 (age 45)	Right Winger
19	Poland	Krzysztof Lijewski	7 July 1983 (age 43)	Right Back
22	Poland	Marcin Lijewski	21 September 1977 (age 49)	Right Back
23	Germany	Pascal Hens	26 March 1980 (age 46)	Left Back

2006–2007 Team
Shirt No	Nationality	Player	Birth Date	Position
1	Serbia	Goran Stojanović	29 January 1966 (age 60)	Goalkeeper
3	Germany	Stefan Schröder	17 July 1981 (age 45)	Right Winger
5	Germany	Torsten Jansen	23 December 1976 (age 49)	Left Winger
6	Switzerland	Iwan Ursic	6 December 1976 (age 49)	Line Player
7	Germany	Matthias Flohr	29 March 1982 (age 44)	Left Winger
8	Brazil	Bruno Souza	27 June 1977 (age 49)	Left Back
9	Germany	Jan Schult	22 September 1986 (age 40)	Left Back
10	Germany	Thomas Knorr	16 May 1971 (age 55)	Central Back
11	Slovenia	Roman Pungartnik	16 May 1971 (age 55)	Right Winger
12	Sweden	Per Sandström	11 January 1981 (age 45)	Goalkeeper
14	France	Bertrand Gille	24 March 1978 (age 48)	Line Player
15	France	Guillaume Gille	12 July 1976 (age 50)	Central Back
16	Germany	Tobias Mahncke	21 November 1984 (age 41)	Goalkeeper
18	Germany	Hanno Holzhüter	4 December 1988 (age 37)	Right Winger
19	Poland	Krzysztof Lijewski	7 July 1983 (age 43)	Right Back
20	Germany	Henning Wiechers	27 April 1974 (age 52)	Goalkeeper
22	Russia	Igor Lavrov	4 June 1973 (age 53)	Central Back
23	Germany	Pascal Hens	26 March 1980 (age 46)	Left Back
77	South Korea	Yoon Kyung-shin	7 July 1973 (age 53)	Right Back

2005–2006 Team
Shirt No	Nationality	Player	Birth Date	Position
1	Serbia	Goran Stojanović	29 January 1966 (age 60)	Goalkeeper
2	Germany	Sebastian Opderbeck	14 August 1986 (age 40)	Left Back
3	Germany	Stefan Schröder	17 July 1981 (age 45)	Right Winger
4	Serbia	Branko Kokir	28 August 1974 (age 52)	Left Back
5	Germany	Torsten Jansen	23 December 1976 (age 49)	Left Winger
6	Germany	Jan Schult	22 September 1986 (age 40)	Left Back
7	Germany	Matthias Flohr	29 March 1982 (age 44)	Left Winger
9	Czech Republic	Alois Mráz	8 September 1978 (age 48)	Left Back
11	Slovenia	Roman Pungartnik	16 May 1971 (age 55)	Right Winger
12	Germany	Henning Wiechers	27 April 1974 (age 52)	Goalkeeper
14	France	Bertrand Gille	24 March 1978 (age 48)	Line Player
15	France	Guillaume Gille	12 July 1976 (age 50)	Central Back
16	Germany	Tobias Mahncke	21 November 1984 (age 41)	Goalkeeper
18	Germany	Matthias Karbowski	21 January 1983 (age 43)	Right Winger
19	Poland	Krzysztof Lijewski	7 July 1983 (age 43)	Right Back
22	Russia	Igor Lavrov	4 June 1973 (age 53)	Central Back
23	Germany	Pascal Hens	26 March 1980 (age 46)	Left Back
68	Germany	Andreas Rastner	10 November 1968 (age 57)	Line Player

2003–2004 Team
Shirt No	Nationality	Player	Birth Date	Position
1	Serbia	Goran Stojanović	29 January 1966 (age 60)	Goalkeeper
2	Denmark	Moustapha Taj	10 October 1972 (age 54)	Right Winger
4	Norway	Tormod Moldestad	29 January 1974 (age 52)	Left Back
5	Germany	Torsten Jansen	23 December 1976 (age 49)	Left Winger
6	Sweden	Peter Möller	22 September 1986 (age 40)	Line Player
7	Sweden	Jonas Ernelind	29 March 1982 (age 44)	Right Winger
8	Sweden	Joakim Ågren	21 April 1970 (age 56)	Central Back
9	Germany	Thomas Knorr	16 May 1971 (age 55)	Central Back
10	Denmark	Morten Bjerre	22 May 1972 (age 54)	Right Back
12	Sweden	Tomas Svensson	15 February 1968 (age 58)	Goalkeeper
13	Germany	Kjell Landsberg	3 November 1980 (age 45)	Line Player
14	France	Bertrand Gille	24 March 1978 (age 48)	Line Player
15	France	Guillaume Gille	12 July 1976 (age 50)	Central Back
16	Germany	Steffen Reider	10 October 1972 (age 54)	Goalkeeper
17	Norway	Simen Muffetangen	6 June 1971 (age 55)	Central Back
18	Germany	Matthias Karbowski	21 January 1983 (age 43)	Right Winger
19	Belarus	Andrej Siniak	28 April 1972 (age 54)	Central Back
20	Spain	Jon Belaustegui	19 March 1979 (age 47)	Right Back
22	Germany	Jörn Kammler	20 April 1981 (age 45)	Left Back
23	Germany	Pascal Hens	26 March 1980 (age 46)	Left Back

== EHF ranking ==
As of 22 October 2026

Rank	Team	Points
144	(Czech Republic) HC ROBE Zubří	27
145	(Sweden) Hammarby IF Handboll	26
146	(Bosnia and Herzegovina) RK Sloboda Tuzla	25
147	(Germany) HSV Hamburg	25
148	(France) PAUC Aix-en-Provence	25
149	(Sweden) HK Malmö	24
150	(Croatia) RK Poreč	24

== Former club members ==
=== Notable former players ===
- (Germany) Johannes Bitter (2007–2016, 2021–)
- (Germany) Matthias Flohr (2004–2016)
- (Germany) Heiko Grimm (2008–2009)
- (Germany) Chrischa Hannawald (2009)
- (Germany) Pascal Hens (2003–2016)
- (Germany) Torsten Jansen (2003–2015, 2016–2017)
- (Germany) Thomas Knorr (2002–2007)
- (Germany) Michael Kraus (2010–2013)
- (Germany) Jürgen Müller (2007–2008)
- (Germany) Arne Niemeyer (2008–2009)
- (Germany) Adrian Pfahl (2013–2015)
- (Germany) Jens Schöngarth (2019–2020)
- (Germany) Kevin Schmidt (2014–2016)
- (Germany) Stefan Schröder (2005–2019)
- (Germany) Manuel Späth (2021–2022)
- (Germany) Nicolai Theilinger (2021–)
- (Germany) Jens Vortmann (2015–2016, 2021–)
- (Germany) Adrian Wagner (1996–2003)
- (Germany) Henning Wiechers (2005–2007)
- (Bosnia and Herzegovina) Enid Tahirović (2012)
- (Belarus) Andrej Kurchev (2002–2003)
- (Belarus) Andrej Siniak (2002–2005)
- (Brazil) Bruno Souza (2006–2008)
- (Croatia) Ilija Brozović (2015–2016)
- (Croatia) Davor Dominiković (2013–2015)
- (Croatia) Domagoj Duvnjak (2009–2014)
- (Croatia) Blaženko Lacković (2008–2014, 2017–2020)
- (Croatia) Igor Vori (2009–2013)
- (Czech Republic) Alois Mráz (2005–2006)
- (Denmark) Morten Bjerre (2003–2004)
- (Denmark) Marcus Cleverly (2013–2014)
- (Denmark) Allan Damgaard (2015–2016)
- (Denmark) Hans Lindberg (2007–2016)
- (Denmark) Casper Ulrich Mortensen (2015–2016, 2021–)
- (Denmark) Henrik Toft Hansen (2013–2015)
- (Estonia) Dener Jaanimaa (2015–2016)
- (France) Bertrand Gille (2002–2012)
- (France) Guillaume Gille (2002–2012)
- (France) Kentin Mahé (2013–2015)
- (Iceland) Aron Rafn Eðvarðsson (2018–2020)
- (South Korea) Yoon Kyung-shin (2006–2008)
- (Montenegro) (Qatar) Žarko Marković (2013–2014)
- (Norway) Tormod Moldestad (1999–2003)
- (Norway) Simen Muffetangen (1999–2003)
- (Poland) Piotr Grabarczyk (2015–2016)
- (Poland) Michał Jurecki (2007–2008)
- (Poland) Krzysztof Lijewski (2005–2011)
- (Poland) Marcin Lijewski (2008–2013)
- (Poland) Maciej Majdziński (2015–2016)
- (Romania) Alexandru Șimicu (2014–2015)
- (Russia) Igor Lavrov (2005–2007)
- (Russia) Dmitri Torgovanov (2007–2009)
- (Russia) Azat Valiullin (2021–)
- (Slovenia) Roman Pungartnik (2005–2007)
- (Slovenia) (North Macedonia) Renato Vugrinec (2011–2012)
- (Spain) Jon Belaustegui (2003–2005)
- (Spain) Joan Cañellas (2013–2014)
- (Serbia) Petar Đorđić (2013–2015)
- (Serbia) Zoran Đorđić (2012)
- (Serbia) Branko Kokir (2005–2006)
- (Serbia) Draško Nenadić (2015–2017)
- (Serbia) Goran Stojanović (2002–2007)
- (Serbia) Stefan Terzić (2012–2013)
- (Switzerland) Iwan Ursic (2006–2008)
- (Sweden) Dan Beutler (2011–2013)
- (Sweden) Oscar Carlén (2011–2013)
- (Sweden) Jonas Ernelind (2002–2004)
- (Sweden) Nicklas Grundsten (2008–2009)
- (Sweden) Andreas Nilsson (2012–2014)
- (Sweden) Fredrik Petersen (2012–2013)
- (Sweden) Johan Petersson (2015)
- (Sweden) Per Sandström (2006–2011)
- (Sweden) Tomas Svensson (2002–2005)
- (Ukraine) (Germany) Oleg Velyky (2008–2010)

=== Former coaches ===
Seasons	Coach	Country
2002–2005	Bob Hanning	(Germany)
2005	Christian Fitzek	(Germany)
2005–2011	Martin Schwalb	(Germany)
2011	Per Carlén	(Sweden)
2011–2012	Jens Häusler	(Germany)
2012–2014	Martin Schwalb	(Germany)
2014	Christian Gaudin	(France)
2014–2015	Jens Häusler	(Germany)
2015–2016	Michael Biegler	(Germany)
2016–2017	Jens Häusler	(Germany)
2017–	Torsten Jansen	(Germany)
