= Johannes Bitter =

German handball player (born 1982)

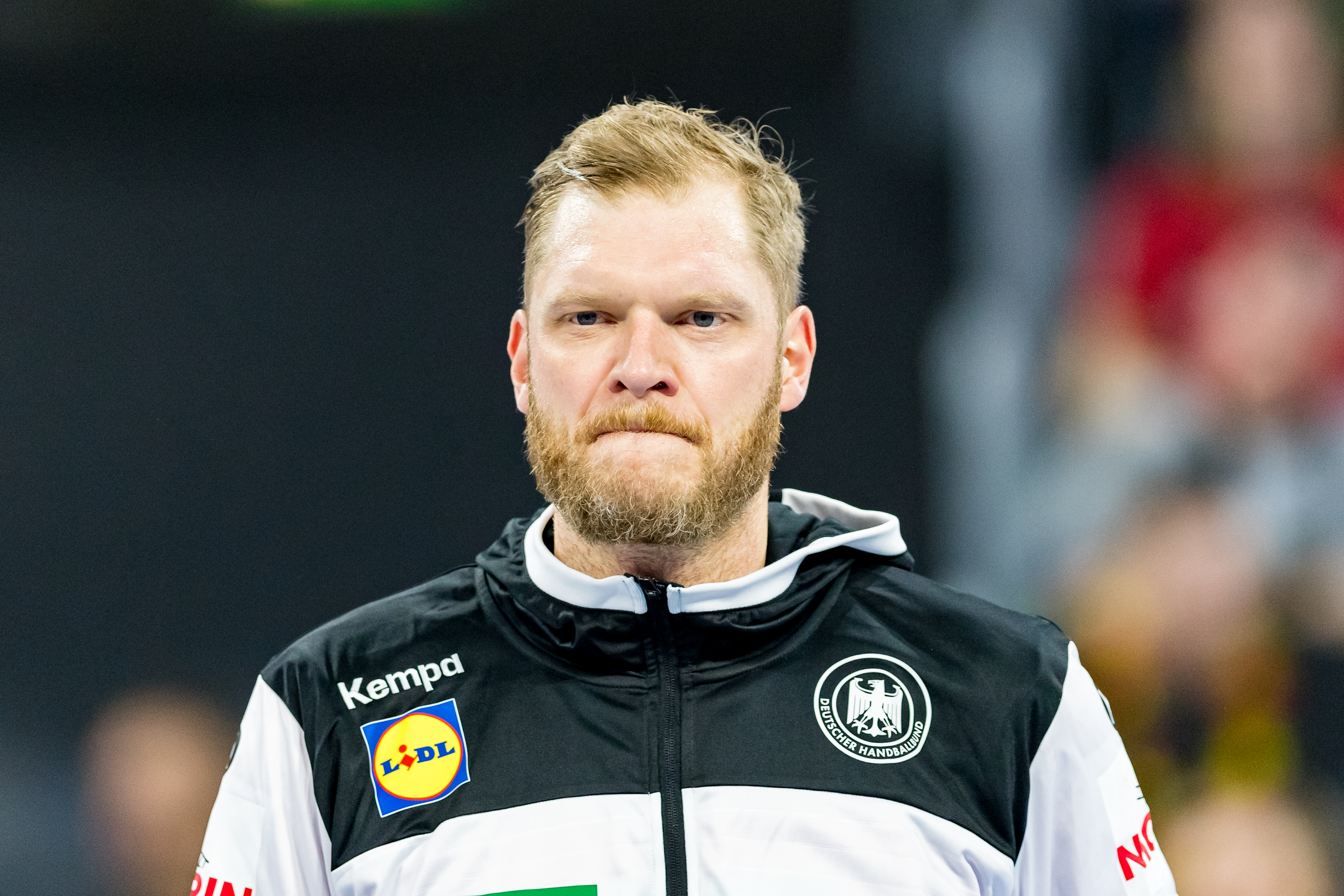
- Johannes Bitter in 2020

Personal information
- Nationality: German
- Born: 2 September 1982 (age 44) Oldenburg, West Germany
- Height: 2.05 m (6 ft 9 in)

Sport
- Sport: Handball
- Position: Goalkeeper

Youth career
- Years: Team
- 1989–1999: HSG Neuenburg/Bockhorn

Senior clubs
- Years: Team
- 1999–2002: SG VTB Altjührden
- 2002–2003: Wilhelmshavener HV
- 2003–2007: SC Magdeburg
- 2007–2016: HSV Hamburg
- 2016–2021: TVB 1898 Stuttgart
- 2021–2024: HSV Hamburg
National team
Years	Team	Apps	(Gls)
2002–2022	Germany	175	(1)
Medal record
Men's handball
Representing Germany
World Championship
Gold medal – first place	2007 Germany

Johannes Bitter (born 2 September 1982) is a German handball goalkeeper for HSV Hamburg.

== Club career ==
Bitter started his senior career with SG VTB Altjührden in 1999, before moving to Wilhelmshavener HV three years later. After only one season in Wilhelmshaven, he signed with SC Magdeburg in 2003, with whom he won the EHF Cup. Following that success, Bitter eventually moved to HSV Hamburg in the summer of 2007. In 2016 Bitter moved from Hamburg to TVB 1898 Stuttgart. There, he has extended his contract by one year to stay with the club until 30 June 2018.

== International career ==
Bitter made his debut for the German national team on 4 January 2002 in Balingen against Switzerland. He is World champion in 2007 with Germany. He also participated on the German team that finished 4th at the 2008 European Championship. Bitter represented Germany at the 2008 Olympics in Beijing, China.

At the 2020 Olympics he represented Germany, where they went out in the quarterfinals to Egypt. He had the highest save percentage of any keeper at the tournament. After the tournament, he announced that he would not be participating in the national team again unless there was an emergency. At the 2022 European Championship he participated again, for the last time.

== Later career ==
Bitter has been a handball commentator both for DAZN and the German TV channel ARD.
