= Alois Mráz =

Czech handball player

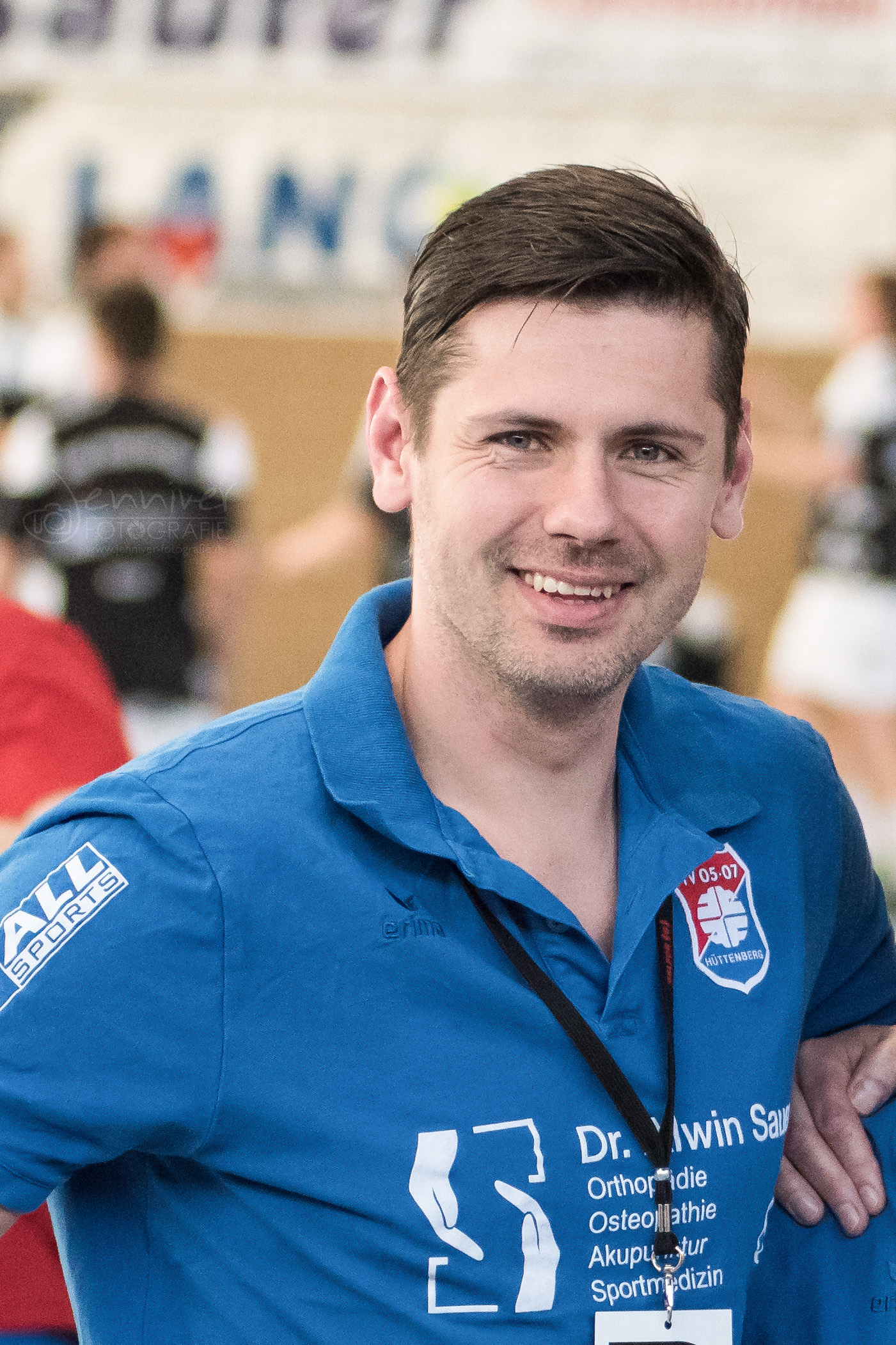

Personal information
- Nationality: Czech
- Born: 8 September 1978 (age 48) Plzeň, Czechoslovakia
- Height: 1.96 m (6 ft 5 in)

Sport
- Sport: Handball
- Position: Left back
- Current club: TV Hüttenberg
National team
Years	Team	Apps	(Gls)
–	Czech Republic	133	(310)

Alois Mráz (born 8 September 1978) is a former Czech handball player for TV Hüttenberg and the Czech national team. From 2008 he is a handball coach as well.
