= Ilija Brozović =

Croatian handball player (born 1991)

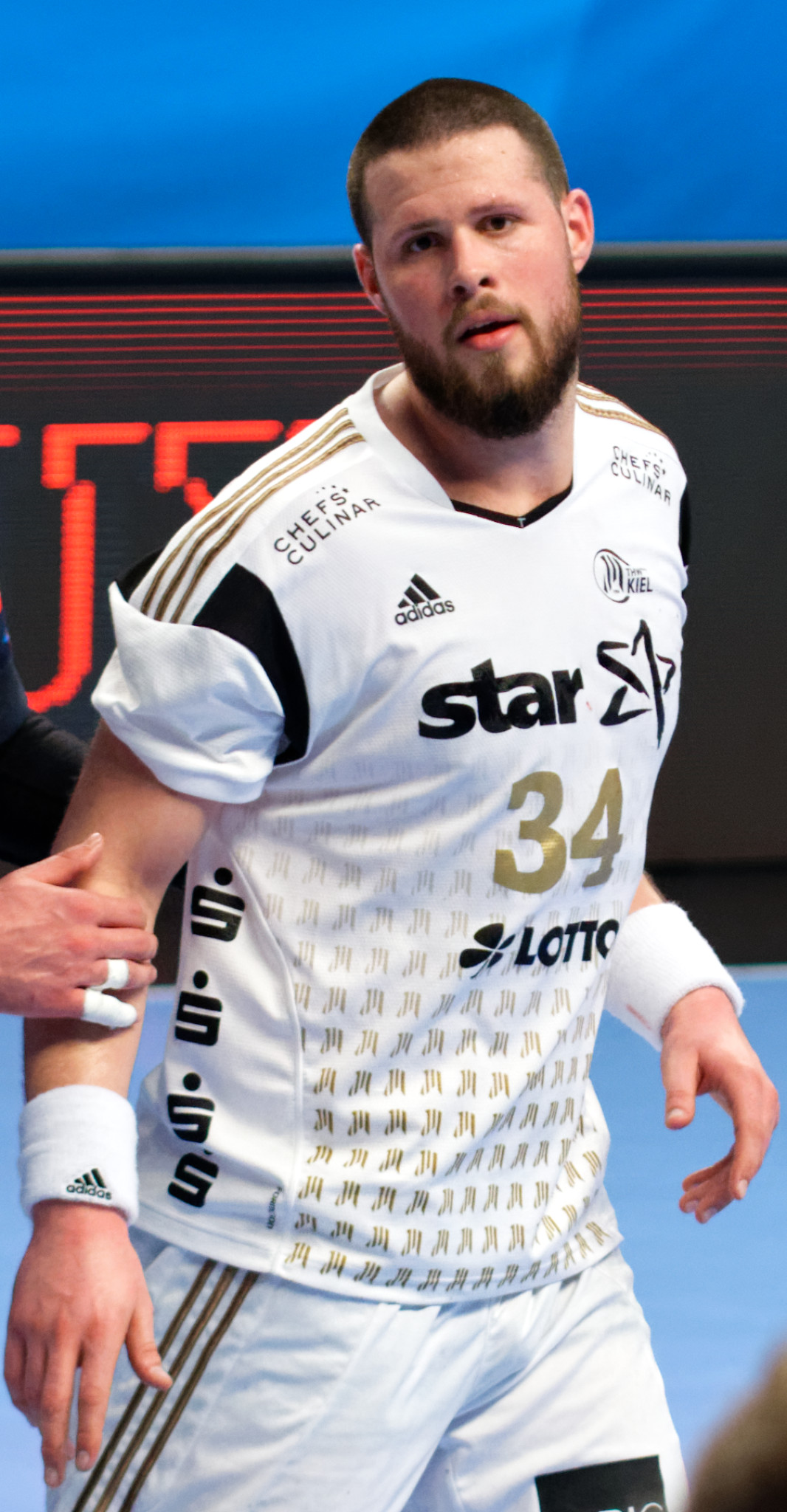

Personal information
- Nationality: Croatian
- Born: 26 May 1991 (age 35) Split, Croatia
- Height: 1.96 m (6 ft 5 in)

Sport
- Sport: Handball
- Position: Pivot
- Current club: RD Slovan
- Number: 44

Senior clubs
- Years: Team
- 2008–2011: RK Metković
- 2011–2015: RK Zagreb
- 2015–2016: HSV Hamburg
- 2016–2017: THW Kiel
- 2017–2024: TSV Hannover-Burgdorf
- 2024–: RD LL Grosist Slovan
National team
Years	Team	Apps	(Gls)
2011–	Croatia	51	(53)
Medal record
European Championship
Silver medal – second place	2020 Sweden/Austria/Norway
Bronze medal – third place	2016 Poland
- Updated on 5 July 2024

Ilija Brozović (born 26 May 1991) is a Croatian handball player for RD Slovan and the Croatian national team.

== Honours ==
RK Zagreb

- Dukat Premier League: 2011–12, 2012–13, 2013–14. 2014–15
- Croatian Cup: 2012, 2013, 2014, 2015
- SEHA League: 2012–13

THW Kiel

- DHB-Pokal: 2017
