= Sports Studies in France =

In France, sport-étude (English: Sports studies) sections are specialised state institutions combining traditional school studies with high level sport education.

To account for the weakness of sports education in the traditional French school curriculum, the French state put in place the specialised institutional network known as the sports-études. These institutions, which combine traditional academic studies with intensive sports training saw their beginnings in the 1960s after the disastrous results registered by France during the summer Olympics of 1960 and 1964. Both the collège cycle (junior high school) and the lycée cycles (senior high school) are concerned and the national network is completed with at least one second-level school per French department containing a sport-étude section.

The sports-études sections ensure the basic learning foundations, but these must be carried out in one of the specialised centres for a particular sport. Each sports federation in France who is attributed a high level label by both the minister for sports and the national commission of that sport, has several of these centres or poles. The National Institute of Sport and Physical Education (Institut national du sport et de l'éducation physique), INSEP, houses several of these poles. In certain, more structured sports, such as soccer, the specialised training is undertaken by a soccer training centre integrated within professional sports clubs.

== See also ==
- Sport in France
