= 2010–11 Handball-Bundesliga =

Handball-Bundesliga
- Season: 2010–11
- Dates: 25 August 2010 - 4 June 2011
- Champions: HSV Hamburg
- Relegated: DHC Rheinland; HSG Ahlen-Hamm; TSG Friesenheim
- Champions League: THW Kiel; Füchse Berlin; Rhein-Neckar Löwen
- EHF Cup: Frisch Auf Göppingen; SC Magdeburg
- Cup Winners Cup: SG Flensburg-Handewitt; VfL Gummersbach
- Matches: 306
- Goals: 17,325 (56.62 per match)
- Top goalscorer: Anders Eggert (SG Flensburg-Handewitt) (248 goals)
- Biggest home win: Kiel 40-18 Balingen
- Biggest away win: Rheinland 19-34 Berlin
- Highest scoring: Hamm 40–34 Flensburg
- Total attendance: 1,436,078
- Average attendance: 4,693

The 2010–11 Handball-Bundesliga was the 46th season of the Handball-Bundesliga, Germany's premier handball league, and the 34th season consisting of only one league. The season started on the weekend of 25 August 2010 and ended with the last games on 4 June 2011. The defending champions were THW Kiel. As in previous years the league was sponsored by Toyota and carries the official name Toyota-Handball-Bundesliga.

== Team information ==
GWD Minden and HSG Düsseldorf were directly relegated after finishing in the bottom two places.

The relegated teams were replaced by HSG Ahlen-Hamm, champions of the 2009–10 2. Handball-Bundesliga North, and TSG Friesenheim, champions of the 2009-10 2. Handball-Bundesliga South.

A further place in the league was decided through a two-legged play-off between the 16th placed team of the previous season and the play-off winner between the two second placed teams of the two 2. Bundesligas. This play-off was won by DHC Rheinland who had finished the previous season in 16th place.

=== Arenas and locations ===
Location of teams in the Handball-Bundesliga

Team	Location	Arena	Arena capacity
VfL Gummersbach	Cologne	Lanxess Arena	19,250 ^{Note 1}
Füchse Berlin	Berlin	O2 World	14,800 ^{Note 2}
Rhein-Neckar Löwen	Mannheim	SAP Arena	14,500
HSV Hamburg	Hamburg	O2 World Hamburg	13,000
THW Kiel	Kiel	Sparkassen-Arena	10,250
Füchse Berlin	Berlin	Max-Schmeling-Halle	9,000 ^{Note 2}
SC Magdeburg	Magdeburg	Bördelandhalle	7,782
Frisch Auf Göppingen	Stuttgart	Porsche Arena	7,500 ^{Note 3}
SG Flensburg-Handewitt	Sinsheim	Campushalle	6,300
TV Grosswallstadt	Aschaffenburg	f.a.n. Frankenstolz arena	6,000 ^{Note 4}
TBV Lemgo	Lemgo	Lipperlandhalle	5,000
HSG Wetzlar	Wetzlar	RITTAL Arena	4,412
Frisch Auf Göppingen	Göppingen	EWS Arena	4,300 ^{Note 3}
MT Melsungen	Kassel	Rothenbach-Halle	4,300
TV Grosswallstadt	Elsenfeld	Sparkassen-Arena	4,200 ^{Note 4}
TSV Hannover-Burgdorf	Hannover	AWD Hall	4,200
TuS Nettelstedt-Lübbecke	Lübbecke	Merkur Arena	3,300
DHC Rheinland	Dormagen	HR Commitment Arena	3,000
HSG Ahlen-Hamm	Hamm	MaxiparkArena	3,000
TSG Friesenheim	Ludwigshafen	Friedrich-Ebert-Halle	2,250
VfL Gummersbach	Gummersbach	Eugen-Haas-Halle	2,100 ^{Note 1}
HBW Balingen-Weilstetten	Balingen	Sparkassen-Arena	2,000

Notes:

1. VfL Gummersbach play high-profile matches which attract a large crowd at the Lanxess Arena.
2. Füchse Berlin generally play at the Max-Schmeling-Halle, however, as this is a multi-use venue some matches may clash with other events and hence are moved to the O2 World Arena.
3. Frisch Auf Göppingen's home venue EWS Arena is currently undergoing renovation/expansion works. In the meantime, all matches are played at Stuttgart's Porsche-Arena.
4. TV Großwallstadt play in Großwallstadt, however, move to Aschaffenburg for high-profile matches.

== League table ==
Pos	Team	Pld	W	D	L	G	GD	Pts
1.	HSV Hamburg (Cup)	34	30	2	2	1105 : 902	+ 203	62 : 6
2.	THW Kiel (C)	34	27	1	6	1099 : 875	+ 224	55 : 13
3.	Füchse Berlin	34	26	3	5	967 : 860	+ 107	55 : 13
4.	Rhein-Neckar Löwen	34	25	3	6	1104 : 980	+ 124	53 : 15
5.	Frisch Auf Göppingen	34	20	5	9	941 : 893	+ 48	45 : 23
6.	SG Flensburg-Handewitt	34	21	2	11	1037 : 950	+ 87	44 : 24
7.	SC Magdeburg	34	19	4	11	1009 : 941	+ 68	42 : 26
8.	VfL Gummersbach	34	17	2	15	1015 : 980	+ 35	36 : 32
9.	TBV Lemgo	34	15	6	13	985 : 955	+ 30	36 : 32
10.	TV Grosswallstadt	34	13	4	17	891 : 929	− 38	30 : 38
11.	HSG Wetzlar	34	12	3	19	842 : 931	− 89	27 : 41
12.	TuS Nettelstedt-Lübbecke	34	10	4	20	950 : 991	− 41	24 : 44
13.	MT Melsungen	34	9	4	21	879 : 982	− 103	22 : 46
14.	TSV Hannover-Burgdorf	34	8	2	23	904 : 1010	− 106	20 : 48
15.	HBW Balingen-Weilstetten	34	7	5	22	894 : 1013	− 119	19 : 49
16.	^{*}DHC Rheinland (PO)	34	8	0	26	848 : 1006	− 158	16 : 52
17.	HSG Ahlen-Hamm (P)	34	6	3	25	923 : 1038	− 115	15 : 53
18.	TSG Friesenheim (P)	34	4	3	27	932 : 1089	− 157	11 : 57

^{*} Der DHC Rheinland steht nach einem Insolvenzverfahren als Zwangsabsteiger fest.

=== Key ===
	Champion/Qualification for EHF Champions League
	Qualification for EHF Champions League
	Qualification for EHF Champions League Play-Offs
	Qualification for EHF Cup
	Qualification for EHF Cup Winners' Cup
	Relegation Play-Off 2. Handball-Bundesliga
	Relegation to 2. Handball-Bundesliga
(C)	Holding Champions
(Cup)	Holding Cupwinners
(PO)	Play-Off Winner
(P)	Promoted

== Results ==
In the table below the home teams are listed on the left and the away teams along the top.

2010/11 as of 06.09.2010	KIE	HSV	FLB	RNL	GUM	FAG	LEM	TVG	FUB	NLU	MAG	MEL	WET	HBD	BAL	RHE	AHL	FRI
THW Kiel		38:35	38:26	31:33	26:26	39:24	35:26	25:28	35:26	36:28	25:22	36:23	38:29	37:26	40:18	33:23	34:23	37:19
HSV Hamburg	26:25		32:24	32:31	35:30	30:25	38:33	22:22	31:27	40:27	32:27	33:23	35:27	34:27	35:28	28:14	36:21	39:25
SG Flensburg-Handewitt	31:37	30:34		32:31	29:25	28:23	23:23	34:27	25:26	34:25	29:33	33:26	42:22	36:26	38:25	38:25	36:29	35:26
Rhein-Neckar Löwen	29:26	27:31	41:31		36:34	28:26	31:31	31:23	33:32	33:28	38:30	40:25	26:26	36:28	36:30	31:28	33:28	38:26
VfL Gummersbach	33:36	29:33	28:29	36:28		29:23	23:28	31:27	32:34	31:26	31:28	25:26	33:23	35:27	32:24	34:26	30:25	28:25
Frisch Auf Göppingen	21:33	32:30	25:21	35:31	37:26		25:25	26:26	27:25	31:23	29:17	23:21	35:23	29:31	25:25	35:29	31:27	30:25
TBV Lemgo	26:33	27:29	34:27	31:36	30:31	27:30		33:27	24:26	24:27	25:27	36:28	35:26	31:27	32:27	34:18	33:29	31:26
TV Grosswallstadt	23:28	25:32	27:28	24:34	25:25	27:31	25:25		21:29	27:26	25:31	34:27	23:22	31:28	22:23	29:18	26:24	30:22
Füchse Berlin	26:23	22:35	24:24	28:28	24:20	28:24	35:24	27:24		25:22	27:26	29:23	26:17	36:28	32:28	33:28	31:28	36:32
TuS Nettelstedt-Lübbecke	27:28	30:30	25:35	30:34	26:27	25:27	31:32	28:29	22:27		29:29	30:26	26:24	33:30	32:22	33:22	32:34	32:32
SC Magdeburg	30:24	30:35	34:29	33:29	37:29	24:24	37:30	34:25	24:30	35:27		28:21	24:20	28:21	23:25	34:24	34:26	41:32
MT Melsungen	23:32	26:30	20:31	28:37	24:25	29:30	27:26	33:28	22:22	30:33	29:29		26:24	24:27	32:29	24:28	27:30	35:26
HSG Wetzlar	24:32	22:27	28:29	27:33	34:31	23:22	24:24	24:18	19:28	24:29	28:25	0:0*		32:26	27:22	27:23	35:26	23:27
TSV Hannover-Burgdorf	22:24	28:39	24:30	25:36	30:29	22:25	26:31	25:27	18:26	29:26	24:24	30:35	23:24		26:25	31:23	28:23	31:29
HBW Balingen-Weilstetten	22:28	24:33	25:28	30:31	29:28	31:31	27:29	23:27	20:29	26:26	25:32	26:30	32:22	30:30		32:31	24:23	30:30
DHC Rheinland	25:32	22:32	19:30	24:27	33:38	21:27	19:26	25:32	19:24	25:24	32:27	31:24	25:26	23:27	29:26		33:28	30:26
HSG Ahlen-Hamm	23:36	28:30	40:34	25:28	24:32	22:29	28:28	29:32	23:28	27:28	29:37	33:33	27:30	30:27	29:30	26:24		23:23
TSG Friesenheim	29:39	26:32	23:28	26:30	33:39	22:24	27:31	26:25	31:39	26:34	33:35	28:29	33:36	29:26	35:31	28:29	26:33	

== Relegation play-off ==
The two second placed teams from the two 2. Handball-Bundesligas play a two-legged play-off to determine the 3rd placed team. The winner of this play of then faces the Bundesliga 16th-placed team for another two-legged play-off. The winner on aggregate score after both matches will earn the final spot in the 2011–12 Handball-Bundesliga.

TBA

2. Bundesliga North 2nd-placed team	v	2. Bundesliga South 2nd-placed team

TBA

2. Bundesliga South 2nd-placed team	v	2. Bundesliga North 2nd-placed team

TBA

Bundesliga 16th-placed team	v	2. Bundesliga 3rd-placed team

TBA

2. Bundesliga 3rd-placed team	v	Bundesliga 16th-placed team

== Statistics ==
=== Top goalscorers ===
Source: (German)

Rank	Player	Team	Goals	7m
1	(Denmark) Hans Lindberg	HSV Hamburg	28	11
2	(Poland) Marcin Lijewski	HSV Hamburg	10	0
3	(Germany) Christian Zeitz	THW Kiel	18	0
4	(Slovenia) Jure Natek	SC Magdeburg	14	0
5	(Germany) Lars Kaufmann	Frisch Auf Göppingen	13	0
5	(Germany) Michael Spatz	TV Grosswallstadt	13	5
