= VfL Lübeck-Schwartau =

German handball club

- Full name: VfL Lübeck-Schwartau
- Founded: 1863; 163 years ago 2002; 24 years ago
- Arena: Hansehalle
- Capacity: 3,200
- President: Michael Friedrichs
- Head coach: Piotr Przybecki
- League: 2. Handball-Bundesliga
- 2024–2025: 12th
- Club colours
Home	Away

VfL Lübeck-Schwartau is a men's handball club from Bad Schwartau, Germany, that plays in the 2. Handball-Bundesliga. They won the DHB-Pokal in 2001.

The club has 2,300 members.

The team used to play under the name VfL Bad Schwartau and was formed in 1863. They played in the Bundesliga until 2002, where HSV Lübeck was formed on the license of VfL Bad Schwartau, and later moved to Hamburg to become HSV Hamburg. This meant that the former 2nd team of VfL Lübeck-Schwartau was now the first team, playing in the Regionalliga at the time. In 2007-08 they were promoted to the 2. Handball-Bundesliga. Since July 1, 2017, the first men's team has been competing under the name VfL Lübeck-Schwartau for marketing reasons.

The women's team played in the Bundesliga in the 1979-80 and 1980-81.

== Accomplishments ==
- DHB-Pokal:
  - Gold: 2001
- Regionalliga:
  - Gold: 2008

== Team ==
=== Current squad ===
Squad for the 2020–21 season

Goalkeepers

- 32 (Germany) Dennis Klockmann
- 49 (Germany) Nils Conrad

Left Wingers

- 2 (Germany) Thees Glabisch
- 7 (Germany) Fynn Gonschor

Right Wingers

- 23 (Germany) Janik Schrader
- 24 (Germany) Finn Kretschmer

Line players

- 13 (Sweden) Carl Löfström
- 15 (Germany) Fynn Ranke

Left Backs

- 9 (Germany) Mex Raguse
- 18 (Germany) Martin Waschul
- 19 (Germany) Jan Schult

Central Backs

- 10 (Sweden) Julius Lindskog Andersson
- 11 (Germany) Markus Hansen

Right Backs

- 20 (Netherlands) Niels Versteijnen
- 77 (Germany) Jasper Bruhn

=== Transfers ===
Transfers for the 2026–27 season

Joining

- (Iceland) Adam Thorstensen (GK) from (Iceland) Stjarnan
- (Israel) Guy Resch Ermann (CB) from (Israel) Maccabi Tel Aviv
- (Germany) Leonard Zink (RB) from (Germany) TuS Vinnhorst
- (Germany) Sören Hartwich (RW) from (Germany) HSG Eider Harde
- (Germany) Maximilian Botta (LP) on loan from (Germany) HSV Hamburg
- (Germany) Christopher Welter (CB) on loan from (Germany) HSV Hamburg
- (Germany) Nicolas Kahmke (LB) on loan from (Germany) TSV Altenholz

Leaving

- (Israel) Nadav Cohen (RW) to (Israel) Handball Club Holon
- (Germany) Janik Schrader (RB) to (Germany) Bergischer HC
- (Germany) Leon Ciudad Benitez (LP) to (Germany) Dessau-Roßlauer HV
- (Germany) Nils Conrad (GK) to (Germany) Eintracht Hildesheim
- (Egypt) Mahmoud El-Shobaky (LB) loan back to (Germany) HSV Hamburg

=== Transfer History ===
Transfers for the 2025–26 season

Joining

- (Germany) Magnus Holpert (CB) from (Denmark) Sønderjyske Handbold
- (Germany) Olé Schramm (LB) from (Germany) 1. VfL Potsdam
- (Germany) Alexander Hartwig (LW) from (Germany) HSV Hamburg

Leaving

- (Netherlands) Kaj Geenen (LW) to (Germany) HSV Hamburg
- (Netherlands) Niko Blaauw (LB) to (Germany) TuS N-Lübbecke

Transfers for the 2020–21 season

Joining

- (Germany) Nils Conrad (GK) from (Germany) TUSEM Essen
- (Sweden) Felix Kasch (LB) from (Denmark) TM Tønder Håndbold
- (Sweden) Julius Lindskog Andersson (CB) from (Germany) TuS Ferndorf
- (Sweden) Carl Löfström (LP) from (Germany) TSV Bayer Dormagen

Leaving

- (Germany) Marino Mallwitz (GK) to (Germany) DJK Rimpar Wölfe
- (Poland) Paweł Genda (LB)
- (Poland) Przemysław Mrozowicz (LB) end of loan (Poland) Zagłębie Lubin
- (Germany) Tim Claasen (CB) to (Germany) HSG Ostsee N/G
- (Iceland) Sigtryggur Daði Rúnarsson (CB) to (Iceland) ÍBV
- (Croatia) Nikola Potić (RB) to (North Macedonia) RK Metalurg Skopje
- (Germany) Marcel Möller (LP) to (Germany) DHK Flensborg
