= DHB-Supercup =

Handball competition

- Sport: Handball
- Founded: 1994; 32 years ago
- Administrator: DHB
- No. of teams: 2
- Country: Germany
- Most recent champion: SC Magdeburg (3rd title)
- Most titles: THW Kiel (13 titles)
- Website: opel-hbl.de

The DHB-Supercup (English: German Handball Supercup) is an handball tournament held annually between the Handball-Bundesliga champions and the DHB-Pokal champion.

== Results ==
Year	Date	Host	Bundesliga champions	Score	Cup winners
1994	17 August 1994	Koblenz	THW Kiel	20–24	SG Wallau-Massenheim
1995	2 September 1995	Kiel	THW Kiel	27–24 (ET)	TBV Lemgo
1996	8 September 1996	Berlin	THW Kiel	23–26	SC Magdeburg
1997	6 September 1997	Hamburg	TBV Lemgo	35–33 (ET)	SG Flensburg-Handewitt (Note: Bundesliga runners-up.)
1998	6 September 1998	Koblenz	THW Kiel	22–20	TV Niederwürzbach (Note: Cup runners-up.)
1999	19 August 1999	Hannover	THW Kiel	24–25	TBV Lemgo
2000	9 August 2000	Hannover	THW Kiel	19–20	SG Flensburg-Handewitt
2001	5 September 2001	Hannover	SC Magdeburg	28–25	VfL Bad Schwartau
2002	4 September 2002	Hannover	THW Kiel	26–34	TBV Lemgo
2003	27 August 2003	Dessau	TBV Lemgo	32–28	SG Flensburg-Handewitt
2004	8 September 2004	Dessau	SG Flensburg-Handewitt	24–25	Handball Hamburg
2005	30 August 2005	Munich	THW Kiel	36–34	SG Flensburg-Handewitt
2006	22 August 2006	Munich	THW Kiel	35–39	Handball Hamburg
2007	21 August 2007	Munich	THW Kiel	41–31	SG Kronau-Östringen
2008	30 August 2008	Munich	THW Kiel	33–28	Handball Hamburg
2009	1 September 2009	Nuremberg	THW Kiel	28–35	Handball Hamburg
2010	24 August 2010	Munich	THW Kiel	26–27	Handball Hamburg
2011	30 August 2011	Munich	Handball Hamburg	23–24	THW Kiel
2012	21 August 2012	Munich	THW Kiel	29–26	SG Flensburg-Handewitt
2013	20 August 2013	Bremen	THW Kiel	26–29	SG Flensburg-Handewitt
2014	19 August 2014	Stuttgart	THW Kiel	24–18	Füchse Berlin
2015	19 August 2015	Stuttgart	THW Kiel	27–26	SG Flensburg-Handewitt
2016	31 August 2016	Stuttgart	Rhein-Neckar Löwen	27–24	SC Magdeburg
2017	23 August 2017	Stuttgart	Rhein-Neckar Löwen	33–31 (PSO)	THW Kiel
2018	22 August 2018	Düsseldorf	SG Flensburg-Handewitt	26–33	Rhein-Neckar Löwen
2019	21 August 2019	Düsseldorf	SG Flensburg-Handewitt	32–31 (PSO)	THW Kiel
2020	26 September 2020	Düsseldorf	THW Kiel	28–24	SG Flensburg-Handewitt
2021	4 September 2021	Düsseldorf	THW Kiel	30–29	TBV Lemgo
2022	31 August 2022	Düsseldorf	SC Magdeburg	33–36	THW Kiel
2023	23 August 2023	Düsseldorf	THW Kiel	37–36 (PSO)	Rhein-Neckar Löwen
2024	31 August 2024	Düsseldorf	SC Magdeburg	30–32	Füchse Berlin
2025	23 August 2025	Munich	Füchse Berlin	34–33 (PSO)	THW Kiel
2026	22 August 2026	Munich	SC Magdeburg	38–31	Füchse Berlin

== Total titles won ==
Club	Titles	Years
THW Kiel	13	1995, 1998, 2005, 2007, 2008, 2011, 2012, 2014, 2015, 2020, 2021, 2022, 2023
TBV Lemgo	4	1997, 1999, 2002, 2003
HSV Hamburg	4	2004, 2006, 2009, 2010
Rhein-Neckar Löwen	3	2016, 2017, 2018
SG Flensburg-Handewitt	3	2000, 2013, 2019
SC Magdeburg	3	1996, 2001, 2026
Füchse Berlin	2	2024, 2025
SG Wallau-Massenheim	1	1994

== See also ==
- Handball-Bundesliga
- DHB-Pokal
