= 2014–15 Serbian Handball Super League =

SuperLiga
- Season: 2014–15
- Biggest home win: Partizan 46–17 Kolubara
- Biggest away win: Kolubara 17–40 Rudar
- Highest scoring: Požarevac 41–28 Kolubara; Planinka 44–25 Kolubara

The 2014–15 Serbian SuperLiga is the 9th season of the SuperLiga, Serbian premier Handball league.

== Team information ==
Location of teams in 2014-15 Serbian SuperLiga

The following 12 clubs compete in the SuperLiga during the 2014–15 season:

Team	Location	Arena	Capacity
Crvena zvezda	Belgrade	SC Šumice	2,000
Jugović	Kać	Dvorana Hram	2,000
Kolubara	Lazarevac	Sportska hala Lazarevac	2,000
Metaloplastika	Šabac	Hala Gimnazije; Dvorana Zorka	1,500; 3,000
Partizan	Belgrade	SC Voždovac	2,300
Planinka	Kuršumlija	Sportska hala Kuršumlija	
Požarevac	Požarevac	Hala sportova u Požarevcu	2,506
Radnički	Kragujevac	Sportska hala Jezero	3,570
Rudar	Kostolac	Sportska hala Kostolac	1,000
Spartak Vojput	Subotica	Hala sportova u Subotici	3,000
Vojvodina	Novi Sad	SC Slana Bara; SPENS	5,096; 7,022
Železničar 1949	Niš	Čair Sports Center	4,800

Team from SEHA League

=== Personnel and kits ===
Following is the list of clubs competing in 2014–15 SuperLiga, with their president, head coach, kit manufacturer and shirt sponsor.

Team	President	Head coach	Kit manufacturer	Shirt sponsor(s)
Crvena zvezda	Igor Butulija	(Serbia) Nenad Peruničić	ASICS	—
Jugović	Branko Ćurčić	(Serbia) Nikola Marković	daCAPO	
Kolubara		(Serbia) Vladimir Dragićević	hummel	RB Kolubara
Metaloplastika	Vladica Spasojević	(Serbia) Slavko Novaković	PWL	—
Partizan	Srđan Cekić	(Serbia) Nenad Maksić	daCAPO	—
Planinka	Radovan Raičević	(Serbia) Saša Marković		Prolom voda
Požarevac	Saša Valjarević	(Serbia) Zlatko Petronijević		
Radnički	Nikola Petrović	(Serbia) Goran Veselinović		Prizma
Rudar	Dragan Milošević	(Serbia) Dragan Ajdačić	hummel	TE-KO Kostolac d.o.o.
Spartak Vojput	Duško Dražić	(Serbia) Branislav Zeljković	hummel	—
Vojvodina	Milan Đukić	(Serbia) Momir Rnić	NAAI	Univerexport
Železničar 1949	Igor Novaković	(Serbia) Vladimir Stanojević	Patrick	NIS

== Regular season ==
=== Standings ===
	Team	Pld	W	D	L	GF	GA	Diff	Pts
1	Spartak Vojput	18	13	1	4	477	439	+38	27
2	Jugović	18	13	0	5	502	444	+58	26
3	Metaloplastika	18	11	3	4	492	422	+70	25
4	Partizan	18	9	4	5	537	487	+50	22
5	Crvena zvezda	18	9	1	8	514	468	+46	19
6	Železničar 1949	18	8	2	8	495	496	−1	18
7	Požarevac	18	6	3	9	481	476	+5	15
8	Rudar Kostolac	18	6	2	10	460	453	+7	14
9	Planinka Prolom voda	18	6	2	10	449	474	−25	14
10	Kolubara	18	0	0	18	415	663	−248	0

Championship Round
Relegation Round

Pld - Played; W - Won; D - Drawn; L - Lost; GF - Goals for; GA - Goals against; Diff - Difference; Pts - Points.

=== Schedule and results ===
In the table below the home teams are listed on the left and the away teams along the top.

	RK Crvena zvezda	RK Jugović	RK Kolubara	RK Metaloplastika	RK Partizan	RK Planinka	MRK Požarevac	RK Rudar	RK Spartak Vojput	RK Železničar 1949
Crvena zvezda		27–25	33–24	24–27	28–24	37–17	29–26	32–24	28–32	28–22
Jugović	30–29		31–13	22–18	33–21	32–24	26–23	28–26	30–25	30–35
Kolubara	22–42	23–31		24–39	22–48	23–29	22–29	17–40	28–36	28–31
Metaloplastika	29–25	27–26	45–19		29–31	30–18	31–21	24–22	19–25	25–22
Partizan	36–30	28–25	46–17	27–27		33–30	33–28	27–28	33–29	28–28
Planinka	21–20	21–22	44–25	23–23	35–26		22–21	15–15	21–24	27–19
Požarevac	29–27	31–34	41–28	24–24	21–21	33–23		21–22	23–24	30–30
Rudar	24–24	27–28	34–30	20–26	27–29	30–28	23–28		19–21	35–27
Spartak Vojput	29–23	22–21	29–25	23–20	25–25	31–24	22–23	24–22		25–21
Železničar 1949	27–28	24–28	35–25	26–29	25–21	30–27	35–29	24–22	34–31	

== Championship round ==
=== Standings ===
	Team	Pld	W	D	L	GF	GA	Diff	Pts	Qualification or relegation
1	Vojvodina	2	2	0	0	56	45	+11	4	Qualification to the Final
2	Jugović	2	1	1	0	49	46	+3	3	Qualification to the Final
3	Spartak Vojput	2	1	1	0	48	47	+1	3	Qualification to EHF Cup second round
4	Metaloplastika	2	1	0	1	57	56	+1	2	
5	Radnički Kragujevac	2	0	0	2	51	58	−7	0	
6	Partizan	2	0	0	2	48	57	−9	0	

Pld - Played; W - Won; D - Drawn; L - Lost; GF - Goals for; GA - Goals against; Diff - Difference; Pts - Points.

=== Schedule and results ===
In the table below the home teams are listed on the left and the away teams along the top.

	RK Jugović	RK Metaloplastika	RK Partizan	RK Radnički Kragujevac	RK Spartak Vojput	RK Vojvodina
Jugović		–	–	–	21–21	–
Metaloplastika	–		–	–	26–27	–
Partizan	25–28	–		–	–	–
Radnički	–	29–31	–		–	22–27
Spartak Vojput	–	–	–	–		–
Vojvodina	–	–	29–23	–	–	

== Relegation round ==
=== Standings ===
	Team	Pld	W	D	L	GF	GA	Diff	Pts	Qualification or relegation
7	Crvena zvezda	12	8	1	3	376	283	+93	17	
8	Rudar Kostolac	12	6	3	3	317	291	+26	15	
9	Požarevac	12	6	2	4	335	306	+29	14	
10	Železničar 1949	12	6	1	5	332	328	+4	13	
11	Planinka Prolom voda	12	6	1	5	311	313	−2	13	Relegation to 2015–16 Prva liga
12	Kolubara	12	0	0	12	296	446	−150	0	Relegation to 2015–16 Prva liga

Pld - Played; W - Won; D - Drawn; L - Lost; GF - Goals for; GA - Goals against; Diff - Difference; Pts - Points.

=== Schedule and results ===
In the table below the home teams are listed on the left and the away teams along the top.

	RK Crvena zvezda	RK Kolubara	RK Planinka	MRK Požarevac	RK Rudar	RK Železničar 1949
Crvena zvezda		54–22	–	–	22–25	–
Kolubara	–		30–34	–	–	–
Planinka	–	–		–	–	–
Požarevac	–	–	–		–	25–22
Rudar	–	–	–	23–23		–
Železničar 1949	–	–	30–24	–	–	
