= Uroš Elezović =

Serbian handball player (born 1982)

Personal information
- Full name: Uroš Elezović
- Nationality: Serbian
- Born: 28 January 1982 (age 44) Banja Luka, SFR Yugoslavia
- Height: 1.92 m (6 ft 4 in)

Sport
- Sport: Handball
- Position: Left back

Senior clubs
- Years: Team
- 1999–2003: Vrbas
- 2003–2006: Sintelon
- 2004: → Partizan
- 2006–2007: Trimo Trebnje
- 2007–2009: Paris Handball
- 2010–2011: Koper
- 2012: Kadetten Schaffhausen
- 2012: Vrbas
- 2013–2015: Vojvodina
- 2015–2016: Lekhwiya
- 2016: Vojvodina
- 2017: Ramat HaSharon
- 2017: Ceglédi KKSE
- 2018: Dinamo Pančevo
- 2018–2019: Vrbas
National team
- Years: Team
- 2015–2016: Serbia

Uroš Elezović (Serbian Cyrillic: Урош Елезовић; born 28 January 1982) is a Serbian former handball player. Currently he is the head coach of Jugović member of Serbian Handball Super League.

== Club career ==
After starting out at Vrbas, Elezović played for Sintelon and Partizan, before moving abroad. He would go on to play in Slovenia, France, Switzerland, Qatar, Israel and Hungary. With Vojvodina, Elezović won three consecutive national championships (2012–13, 2013–14 and 2014–15). He ended his career back in Serbia playing for Proleter Zrenjanin (2019–20) where also started his coaching career as assistant coach.

== International career ==
At international level, Elezović represented Serbia at the 2016 European Championship.

== Personal life ==
Elezović is the son of fellow handball player Jovica Elezović.

== Honours ==
Kadetten Schaffhausen

- Swiss Handball League: 2011–12

Vojvodina

- Serbian Handball Super League: 2012–13, 2013–14, 2014–15
- Serbian Handball Cup: 2014–15
- Serbian Handball Super Cup: 2013, 2014, 2016
