= Zoran Kurteš =

Serbian handball player and coach (1965-2010)

Zoran Kurteš (Serbian Cyrillic: Зopан Куртeш; December 23, 1965 – May 7, 2010) was a Serbian team handball player and coach.

Zoran Kurteš died at the age of 44 after a cardiac arrest in Mamaia, Romania. At the time of his death he was the coach of HCM Constanța, a team with excellent results during his stewardship. He was coaching in Romania since September 29, 2008.

He was married with two children, his family living in Novi Sad.

== Playing career ==
Zoran Kurteš was a team handball player until he became a coach. He played 11 seasons for RK Jugović in the Serbian League.

== Coaching career ==
=== Clubs ===
- (Serbia) RK Jugović
- (Serbia) RK Sintelon
- (Serbia) RK Crvenka
- (Serbia) RK Partizan
- (Serbia) RK Vojvodina
- (Hungary) SC Pick Szeged
- (Egypt) Al Ahly
- (Romania) HCM Constanța

=== National Teams ===
- Serbia

== Achievements ==
=== Clubs ===
- Serbian League: 3 times
- Serbian Cup: 3 times
- Egyptian League: 1 times
- Romanian League: 2 times
- EHF Challenge Cup: Semifinals (with RK Partizan)
- EHF Cup Winners' Cup: Semifinals (with RK Partizan)
- EHF Champions League: 1/8 (with SC Pick Szeged), 1/8 (with HCM Constanța)

=== National Teams ===
- 2003 World Men's Handball Championship: 8th place (with Serbia)

== Death ==
Zoran Kurteš started to feel ill on the evening of May 7, 2010, in his hotel room in the seaside resort of Mamaia. A friend of his called 112. In about 7 minutes a SMURD ambulance arrived at the Flora Hotel. At 11 pm, after almost an hour of attempted resuscitation, Zoran died. The cause of death was cardiac arrest.
