= Miloš Orbović =

Serbian handball player (born 1993)

Personal information
- Full name: Miloš Orbović
- Nationality: Serbian
- Born: 2 November 1993 (age 32) Vrbas, Serbia, FR Yugoslavia
- Height: 1.94 m (6 ft 4 in)

Sport
- Sport: Handball
- Position: Right back
- Current club: HC Kriens-Luzern
- Number: 10

Youth career
- Years: Team
- –: RK Vrbas

Senior clubs
- Years: Team
- 2010–2014: RK Vrbas
- 2014–2017: RK Vojvodina
- 2017–2019: SCM Politehnica Timișoara
- 2019–2020: Bidasoa Irún
- 2020–2021: HC Motor Zaporizhzhia
- 2021–: HC Kriens-Luzern
National team
Years	Team	Apps	(Gls)
2015-	Serbia	25	(39)
- Updated on 15 December 2023

Miloš Orbović (Serbian Cyrillic: Милош Орбовић; born 2 November 1993) is a Serbian handball player who plays for HC Kriens-Luzern and the Serbia national team.

== Club career ==
Orbović started out at Vrbas. He later spent three seasons with Vojvodina (2014–2017), winning three consecutive championships.

== International career ==
A full Serbia international since 2015, Orbović made his major debut for the national team at the 2016 European Championship.

== Honours ==
Vojvodina

- Serbian Handball Super League: 2014–15, 2015–16, 2016–17
- Serbian Handball Cup: 2014–15
- Serbian Handball Super Cup: 2014, 2015, 2016

Politehnica Timișoara

- Cupa României: 2018–19
