= Živan Pešić =

Serbian handball player (born 1993)

Personal information
- Full name: Živan Pešić
- Nationality: Serbian
- Born: 7 July 1993 (age 33) Novi Sad, Serbia, FR Yugoslavia
- Height: 1.96 m (6 ft 5 in)

Sport
- Sport: Handball
- Position: Pivot
- Current club: RK Nexe Našice
- Number: 25

Youth career
- Years: Team
- –: RK Sintelon

Senior clubs
- Years: Team
- 2010–2014: Veszprém KC
- 2014: → ETO-SZESE Győr (loan)
- 2014–2015: RK Celje
- 2016: RK Partizan
- 2016–2017: RK Vojvodina
- 2017–2019: CB Ademar León
- 2019–2021: RK Nexe Našice
- 2021–2022: Hapoel Rishon LeZion
- 2022–2024: RK Vojvodina
- 2024–2025: GRK Ohrid
- 2025–: RK Nexe Našice
National team
- Years: Team
- 2013–: Serbia

Živan Pešić (Serbian Cyrillic: Живан Пешић; born 7 July 1993) is a Serbian handball player for RK Nexe Našice and the Serbia national team.

== Career ==
After starting out at Sintelon, Pešić moved abroad to Hungary and signed with MKB Veszprém in 2010. He was loaned to ETO-SZESE Győr in early 2014. Later on, Pešić played for Slovenian club Celje until late 2015. He returned to his homeland and signed with Partizan in March 2016.

A Serbia international since 2013, Pešić participated at the 2020 European Men's Handball Championship.

== Honours ==
Vojvodina

- Serbian Handball Super League: 2016–17
