= Nikola Crnoglavac =

Serbian handball player (born 1992)

Personal information
- Full name: Nikola Crnoglavac
- Nationality: Serbian
- Born: 22 April 1992 (age 34) Kraljevo, SR Serbia, SFR Yugoslavia
- Height: 1.95 m (6 ft 5 in)

Sport
- Sport: Handball
- Position: Right back

Youth career
- Years: Team
- –: Jugović

Senior clubs
- Years: Team
- 2010–2015: Jugović
- 2015–2016: Tatabánya
- 2016–2019: Dobrogea Sud Constanța
- 2019–2021: CSM Bacău
- 2021–2022: Beşiktaş
- 2022–2024: CSM Focșani
- 2024–2026: Partizan
National team
- Years: Team
- 2017–: Serbia

Nikola Crnoglavac (Serbian Cyrillic: Никола Црноглавац; born 22 April 1992) is a Serbian handball player who last played for Partizan. He also represents the Serbia national team.

== Career ==
Crnoglavac started out at Jugović in the Serbian Handball Super League. He later played abroad in Hungary (Tatabánya) and Romania (Dobrogea Sud Constanța and CSM Bacău).

A Serbia international since 2017, Crnoglavac participated in two European Championships (2018 and 2020).

== Honours ==
Dobrogea Sud Constanța

- Romanian Cup: 2017–18
- Romanian Supercup: 2017

Beşiktaş

- Turkish Super League: 2021–22

Partizan

- Serbian Super League: 2024–25, 2025–26
- Serbian Cup: 2025–26
- Serbian Supercup: 2025–26, 2026
- All-Serbian Cup: 2025–26, 2026
