= Jovan Kovačević (handballer) =

Serbian handball player (born 1970)

Personal information
- Full name: Jovan Kovačević
- Nationality: Serbian
- Born: 14 September 1970 (age 56) Vrbas, SR Serbia, SFR Yugoslavia
- Height: 1.92 m (6 ft 4 in)

Sport
- Sport: Handball
- Position: Centre back

Youth career
- Years: Team
- –: Vrbas

Senior clubs
- Years: Team
- –: Vrbas
- 1993–1995: Partizan
- 1995–1997: Vrbas
- 1997–1998: Bidasoa
- 1998–1999: Cangas
- 1999–2002: SG Hameln
- 2002–2003: Grasshoppers
- 2003–2006: Torggler Group Meran
National team
- Years: Team
- 1996–2002: FR Yugoslavia
Medal record
Men's handball
Representing FR Yugoslavia
European Championship
Bronze medal – third place	1996 Spain	Team

Jovan Kovačević (Serbian Cyrillic: Јован Ковачевић; born 14 September 1970) is a Serbian former handball player.

== Club career ==
Kovačević started out at his hometown club Vrbas. He would spend two seasons with Partizan between 1993 and 1995, winning back-to-back championships.

In 1997, Kovačević moved abroad to Spain and signed with Bidasoa. He also played for fellow Liga ASOBAL team Cangas, before moving to Germany in 1999.

After spending three seasons at SG Hameln, Kovačević was signed by Swiss club Grasshoppers in 2002. He moved to Italian side Torggler Group Meran in 2003.

== International career ==
At international level, Kovačević competed for FR Yugoslavia in four major tournaments, winning the bronze medal at the 1996 European Championship.

== Honours ==
Partizan

- Handball Championship of FR Yugoslavia: 1993–94, 1994–95
- Handball Cup of FR Yugoslavia: 1993–94
