= Miljan Pušica =

Serbian handball player (born 1991)

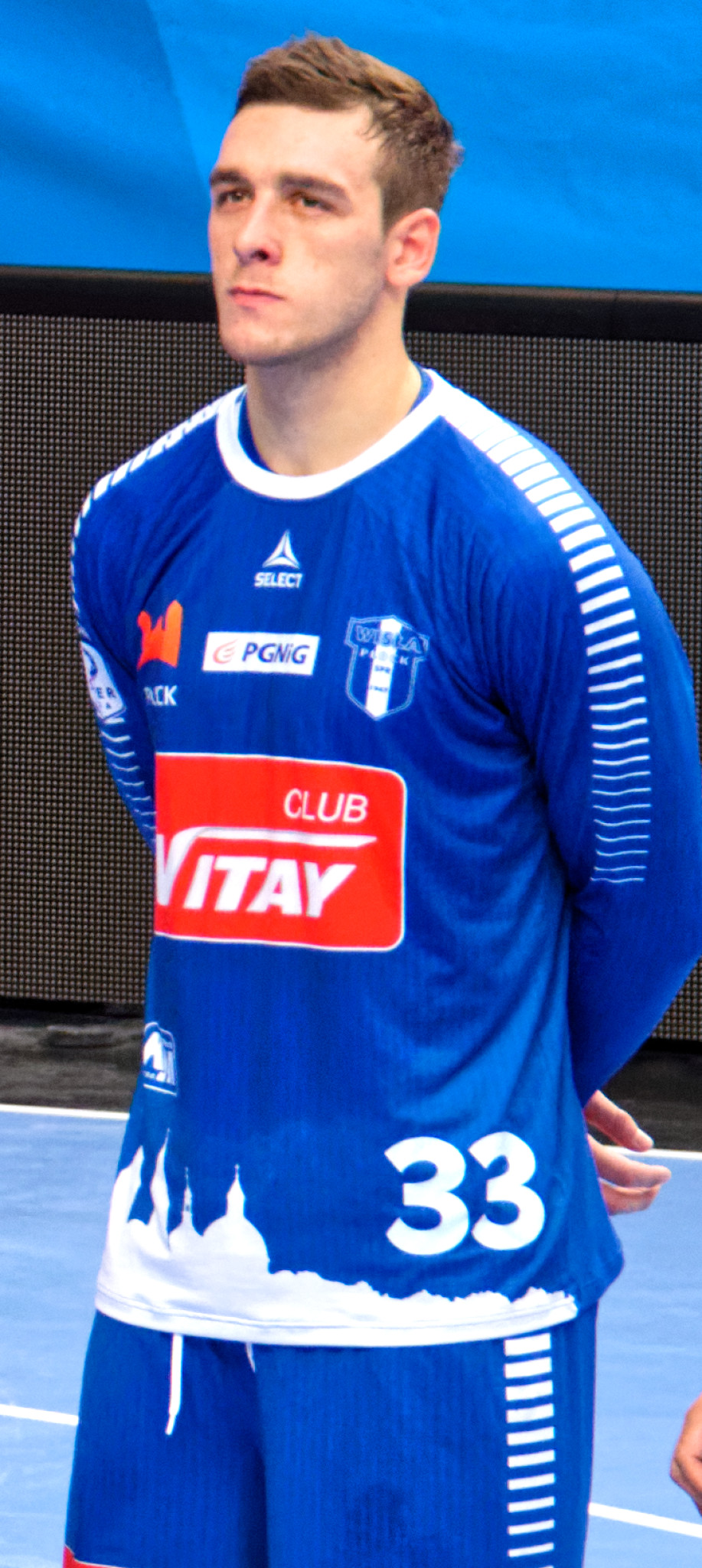
- Pušica in 2016

Personal information
- Full name: Miljan Pušica
- Nationality: Serbian
- Born: 30 June 1991 (age 35) Prijepolje, SR Serbia, SFR Yugoslavia
- Height: 2.02 m (6 ft 8 in)

Sport
- Sport: Handball
- Position: Left back

Youth career
- Years: Team
- –: Beli anđeo
- –: RK Kolubara
- –: Novi Beograd

Senior clubs
- Years: Team
- 2010–2012: RK Crvena zvezda
- 2012–2014: RK Vojvodina
- 2014–2017: Wisła Płock
- 2017–2022: GWD Minden
- 2022–2026: RK Vojvodina
National team
Years	Team	Apps	(Gls)
2013–2025	Serbia	44	(79)
- Updated on 3 July 2022

Miljan Pušica (Serbian Cyrillic: Миљан Пушица; born 30 June 1991) is a Serbian handball player who last played for Vojvodina. He also represented Serbia national team.

== Club career ==
After playing for Crvena zvezda and Vojvodina, Pušica moved abroad and signed with Wisła Płock in 2014. He spent three seasons with the Polish club, before joining German team GWD Minden in 2017.

== International career ==
A Serbia international since 2013, Pušica participated in two European Championships (2016 and 2020).

== Honours ==
Vojvodina

- Serbian Handball Super League: 2012–13, 2013–14
- Serbian Handball Super Cup: 2013
