= Ilija Abutović =

Serbian handball player (born 1988)

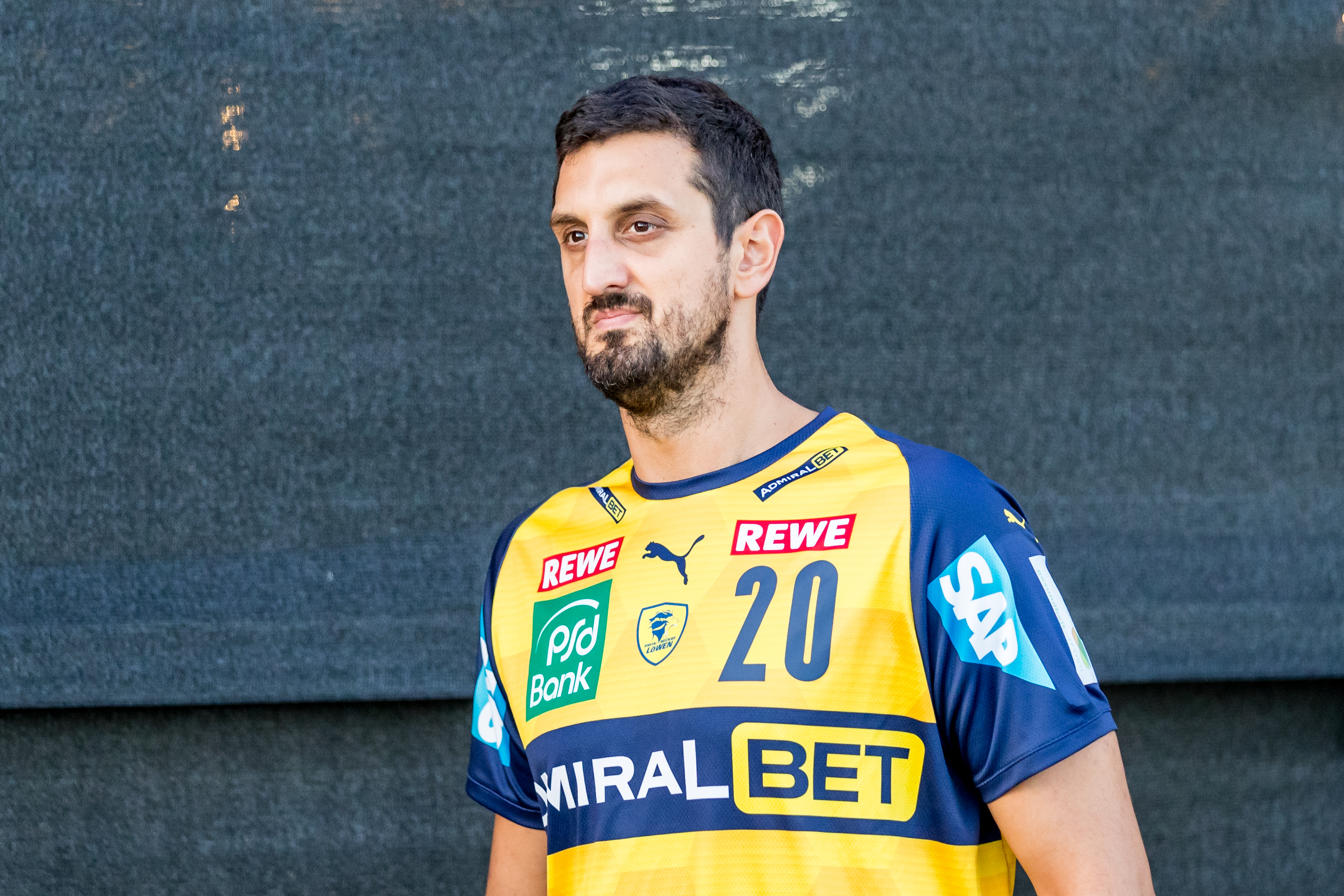

Personal information
- Full name: Ilija Abutović
- Nationality: Serbian
- Born: 2 August 1988 (age 38) Vrbas, SR Serbia, SFR Yugoslavia
- Height: 2.02 m (6 ft 8 in)

Sport
- Sport: Handball
- Position: Left back
- Current club: Partizan
- Number: 20

Youth career
- Years: Team
- –: Crvenka

Senior clubs
- Years: Team
- 2006–2007: Spartak Subotica
- 2007–2010: Partizan
- 2010–2011: Slovan
- 2011–2018: Vardar
- 2018–2022: Rhein-Neckar Löwen
- 2022–2024: C' Chartres Métropole
- 2024–2026: Eurofarm Pelister
- 2026–present: Partizan
National team
Years	Team	Apps	(Gls)
2014–2024	Serbia	55	(22)
- Updated on 8 November 2024

Ilija Abutović (Serbian Cyrillic: Илија Абутовић; born 2 August 1988) is a Serbian handball player for Partizan. He also represented the Serbia national team.

== Club career ==
After playing for Spartak Subotica, Abutović was transferred to Partizan in 2007. He moved abroad to Slovenian club Slovan in 2010. Between 2011 and 2018, Abutović spent seven seasons with Vardar and won numerous trophies, including the 2016–17 EHF Champions League.

== International career ==
At international level, Abutović represented Serbia at the 2016 European Championship.

== Honours ==
Partizan

- Serbian Super League: 2008–09
- Serbian Cup: 2007–08
- Serbian Supercup: 2009, 2026
- All-Serbian Cup: 2026

Vardar

- EHF Champions League: 2016–17
- SEHA League: 2011–12, 2013–14, 2016–17, 2017–18
- Macedonian Super League: 2012–13, 2014–15, 2015–16, 2016–17, 2017–18
- Macedonian Cup: 2011–12, 2013–14, 2014–15, 2015–16, 2016–17, 2017–18

Rhein-Neckar Löwen

- German Supercup: 2018

Eurofarm Pelister

- Macedonian Super League: 2024–25
- Macedonian Supercup: 2025
