= 2014–15 EHF Champions League qualifying =

This article describes the qualifying of the 2014–15 EHF Champions League.

== Format ==
Twelve teams will take part in the qualification tournaments. They were drawn into three groups of four teams, where they play a semifinal and a final or third place match. The winners of the qualification tournaments, played on 6–7 September 2014, will qualify for the group stage, while the eliminated teams will be transferred to the 2014–15 EHF Cup. The draw took place on 26 June 2014, at 14:00 local time, in Vienna, Austria.

== Seedings ==
The seedings were published on 23 June 2014.

Pot 1	Pot 2	Pot 3	Pot 4
(Ukraine) HC Motor Zaporizhzhia (Belarus) HC Meshkov Brest (Romania) H.C.M. Constanța	(Serbia) RK Vojvodina (Portugal) F.C. Porto (Norway) Haslum HK	(Slovakia) HT Tatran Prešov (Austria) Alpla HC Hard (Turkey) Beşiktaş J.K.	(Netherlands) Targos Bevo HC (Belgium) Initia Hasselt (Italy) Junior Fasano

== Qualification tournament 1 ==
HC Meshkov Brest has the right to organize the tournament.

=== Bracket ===
Semifinals
6 September
(Belarus) HC Meshkov Brest	36
(Netherlands) Targos Bevo HC	23
6 September
(Serbia) RK Vojvodina	21
(Slovakia) HT Tatran Prešov	25

Final
7 September
(Belarus) HC Meshkov Brest	26
(Slovakia) HT Tatran Prešov	24
Third place game
7 September
(Netherlands) Targos Bevo HC	25
(Serbia) RK Vojvodina	30

=== Semifinals ===
6 September 2014; 16:00	RK Vojvodina (Serbia)	21–25	(Slovakia) HT Tatran Prešov	Sportshall Victoria, Brest; Attendance: 400; Referees: Baranowski, Lemanowicz (POL)
6 September 2014; 16:00	Elezović 6	(10–15)	Rábek 7	Sportshall Victoria, Brest; Attendance: 400; Referees: Baranowski, Lemanowicz (POL)
6 September 2014; 16:00	3× (yellow card) 5× (suspension)	Report	3× (yellow card) 6× (suspension)	Sportshall Victoria, Brest; Attendance: 400; Referees: Baranowski, Lemanowicz (POL)

6 September 2014; 18:30	HC Meshkov Brest (Belarus)	36–23	(Netherlands) Targos Bevo HC	Sportshall Victoria, Brest; Attendance: 1,500; Referees: Krkačev, Kolevski (MKD)
6 September 2014; 18:30	Bozovic, Razgor 6	(18–8)	Polman 7	Sportshall Victoria, Brest; Attendance: 1,500; Referees: Krkačev, Kolevski (MKD)
6 September 2014; 18:30	3× (yellow card) 6× (suspension)	Report	3× (yellow card) 2× (suspension)	Sportshall Victoria, Brest; Attendance: 1,500; Referees: Krkačev, Kolevski (MKD)

=== Third place game ===
7 September 2014; 16:00	Targos Bevo HC (Netherlands)	25–30	(Serbia) RK Vojvodina	Sportshall Victoria, Brest; Attendance: 200; Referees: Baranowski, Lemanowicz (POL)
7 September 2014; 16:00	van den Beucken 11	(11–15)	Elezović 6	Sportshall Victoria, Brest; Attendance: 200; Referees: Baranowski, Lemanowicz (POL)
7 September 2014; 16:00	3× (yellow card) 2× (suspension)	Report	2× (yellow card) 3× (suspension)	Sportshall Victoria, Brest; Attendance: 200; Referees: Baranowski, Lemanowicz (POL)

=== Final ===
7 September 2014; 18:30	HC Meshkov Brest (Belarus)	26–24	(Slovakia) HT Tatran Prešov	Sportshall Victoria, Brest; Attendance: 3,500; Referees: Krkačev, Kolevski (MKD)
7 September 2014; 18:30	Rutenka 6	(12–12)	Antl 6	Sportshall Victoria, Brest; Attendance: 3,500; Referees: Krkačev, Kolevski (MKD)
7 September 2014; 18:30	3× (yellow card) 2× (suspension)	Report	3× (yellow card) 2× (suspension)	Sportshall Victoria, Brest; Attendance: 3,500; Referees: Krkačev, Kolevski (MKD)

== Qualification tournament 2 ==
Alpla HC Hard has the right to organize the tournament.

=== Bracket ===
Semifinals
5 September
(Ukraine) Motor Zaporizhzhia	36
(Italy) Junior Fasano	20
5 September
(Portugal) F.C. Porto	29
(Austria) Alpla HC Hard	25

Final
6 September
(Ukraine) Motor Zaporizhzhia	30
(Portugal) F.C. Porto	26
Third place game
6 September
(Italy) Junior Fasano	26
(Austria) Alpla HC Hard	35

=== Semifinals ===
5 September 2014; 17:00	Motor Zaporizhzhia (Ukraine)	36–20	(Italy) Junior Fasano	Sporthalle am See, Hard; Attendance: 300; Referees: Konjičanin, Konjičanin (BIH)
5 September 2014; 17:00	Kozakevych 9	(17–11)	Beharevic 7	Sporthalle am See, Hard; Attendance: 300; Referees: Konjičanin, Konjičanin (BIH)
5 September 2014; 17:00	3× (yellow card) 2× (suspension)	Report	2× (yellow card) 1× (suspension)	Sporthalle am See, Hard; Attendance: 300; Referees: Konjičanin, Konjičanin (BIH)

5 September 2014; 19:30	F.C. Porto (Portugal)	29–25	(Austria) Alpla HC Hard	Sporthalle am See, Hard; Attendance: 1,500; Referees: Baďura, Ondogrecula (SVK)
5 September 2014; 19:30	Ferraz, Schubert 6	(16–14)	Živković 8	Sporthalle am See, Hard; Attendance: 1,500; Referees: Baďura, Ondogrecula (SVK)
5 September 2014; 19:30	2× (yellow card) 6× (suspension) 1× (red card)	Report	3× (yellow card) 6× (suspension)	Sporthalle am See, Hard; Attendance: 1,500; Referees: Baďura, Ondogrecula (SVK)

=== Third place game ===
6 September 2014; 17:00	Junior Fasano (Italy)	26–35	(Austria) Alpla HC Hard	Sporthalle am See, Hard; Attendance: 450; Referees: Konjičanin, Konjičanin (BIH)
6 September 2014; 17:00	Beharevic 9	(11–18)	Schlinger 6	Sporthalle am See, Hard; Attendance: 450; Referees: Konjičanin, Konjičanin (BIH)
6 September 2014; 17:00	2× (yellow card) 5× (suspension)	Report	2× (yellow card) 3× (suspension)	Sporthalle am See, Hard; Attendance: 450; Referees: Konjičanin, Konjičanin (BIH)

=== Final ===
6 September 2014; 19:30	Motor Zaporizhzhia (Ukraine)	30–26	(Portugal) F.C. Porto	Sporthalle am See, Hard; Attendance: 450; Referees: Baďura, Ondogrecula (SVK)
6 September 2014; 19:30	Burka 9	(16–12)	Ferraz 8	Sporthalle am See, Hard; Attendance: 450; Referees: Baďura, Ondogrecula (SVK)
6 September 2014; 19:30	3× (yellow card) 5× (suspension) 1× (red card)	Report	3× (yellow card) 5× (suspension)	Sporthalle am See, Hard; Attendance: 450; Referees: Baďura, Ondogrecula (SVK)

== Qualification tournament 3 ==
Initia Hasselt has the right to organize the tournament.

=== Bracket ===
Semifinals
6 September
(Romania) H.C.M. Constanța	29
(Belgium) Initia Hasselt	20
6 September
(Norway) Haslum HK	22
(Turkey) Beşiktaş J.K.	29

Final
7 September
(Romania) H.C.M. Constanța	25
(Turkey) Beşiktaş J.K.	34
Third place game
7 September
(Belgium) Initia Hasselt	26
(Norway) Haslum HK	35

=== Semifinals ===
6 September 2014; 17:30	Haslum HK (Norway)	22–29	(Turkey) Beşiktaş J.K.	Sporthal Alverberg, Hasselt; Attendance: 550; Referees: Pavićević, Ražnatović (MNE)
6 September 2014; 17:30	Mamelund 5	(11–17)	Arifoğlu 6	Sporthal Alverberg, Hasselt; Attendance: 550; Referees: Pavićević, Ražnatović (MNE)
6 September 2014; 17:30	3× (yellow card) 4× (suspension)	Report	3× (yellow card) 7× (suspension)	Sporthal Alverberg, Hasselt; Attendance: 550; Referees: Pavićević, Ražnatović (MNE)

6 September 2014; 20:00	H.C.M. Constanța (Romania)	29–20	(Belgium) Initia Hasselt	Sporthal Alverberg, Hasselt; Attendance: 550; Referees: Brkić, Jusufhodžić (AUT)
6 September 2014; 20:00	Humet 7	(13–13)	Dewit, Köhlen 5	Sporthal Alverberg, Hasselt; Attendance: 550; Referees: Brkić, Jusufhodžić (AUT)
6 September 2014; 20:00	2× (yellow card) 3× (suspension)	Report	3× (yellow card) 3× (suspension)	Sporthal Alverberg, Hasselt; Attendance: 550; Referees: Brkić, Jusufhodžić (AUT)

=== Third place game ===
7 September 2014; 14:45	Initia Hasselt (Belgium)	26–35	(Norway) Haslum HK	Sporthal Alverberg, Hasselt; Attendance: 250; Referees: Brkić, Jusufhodžić (AUT)
7 September 2014; 14:45	Köhlen 8	(8–17)	three players 5	Sporthal Alverberg, Hasselt; Attendance: 250; Referees: Brkić, Jusufhodžić (AUT)
7 September 2014; 14:45	3× (yellow card) 4× (suspension) 1× (red card)	Report	3× (yellow card) 5× (suspension)	Sporthal Alverberg, Hasselt; Attendance: 250; Referees: Brkić, Jusufhodžić (AUT)

=== Final ===
7 September 2014; 17:00	H.C.M. Constanța (Romania)	25–34	(Turkey) Beşiktaş J.K.	Sporthal Alverberg, Hasselt; Attendance: 400; Referees: Pavićević, Ražnatović (MNE)
7 September 2014; 17:00	Toma 7	(12–18)	Ninčević 6	Sporthal Alverberg, Hasselt; Attendance: 400; Referees: Pavićević, Ražnatović (MNE)
7 September 2014; 17:00	3× (yellow card) 4× (suspension)	Report	3× (yellow card) 2× (suspension)	Sporthal Alverberg, Hasselt; Attendance: 400; Referees: Pavićević, Ražnatović (MNE)
