= Zoran Nikolić (handballer) =

Serbian handball player (born 1991)

Personal information
- Full name: Zoran Nikolić
- Nationality: Serbian
- Born: 23 February 1991 (age 35) Belgrade, SR Serbia, SFR Yugoslavia
- Height: 1.88 m (6 ft 2 in)

Sport
- Sport: Handball
- Position: Pivot
- Current club: HC Dobrogea Sud

Senior clubs
- Years: Team
- –: PKB
- 2011–2013: RK Radnički Kragujevac
- 2013–2016: RK Vojvodina
- 2016–: HC Dobrogea Sud
National team
- Years: Team
- 2016–: Serbia

Zoran Nikolić (Serbian Cyrillic: Зоран Николић; born 23 February 1991) is a Serbian handball player for HC Dobrogea Sud and the Serbia national team.

== Career ==
After playing for PKB, Nikolić signed with Radnički Kragujevac in 2011. He spent two seasons with the club, before transferring to Vojvodina in 2013. After winning three consecutive Serbian Handball Super League titles, Nikolić moved abroad to Romanian club Dobrogea Sud Constanța in 2016.

A Serbia international since 2016, Nikolić participated at the 2019 World Men's Handball Championship and 2020 European Men's Handball Championship.

== Honours ==
Vojvodina

- Serbian Handball Super League: 2013–14, 2014–15, 2015–16
- Serbian Handball Cup: 2014–15
