= Mirko Milašević =

Montenegrin handball player (born 1985)

Personal information
- Full name: Mirko Milašević
- Nationality: Montenegrin
- Born: 27 July 1985 (age 41) Cetinje, SFR Yugoslavia
- Height: 1.96 m (6 ft 5 in)

Sport
- Sport: Handball
- Position: Centre back
- Current club: Jugović
- Number: 5

Youth career
- Years: Team
- –: Budvanska rivijera

Senior clubs
- Years: Team
- 2003–2004: Jugović
- 2004–2006: Vojvodina
- 2006–2008: Crvena zvezda
- 2009: Budućnost Podgorica
- 2009–2010: Toledo
- 2010–2011: Alcobendas
- 2011–2012: HSC Suhr Aarau
- 2012–2013: Puerto Sagunto
- 2013–2015: Billère
- 2015: Dinamo București
- 2016: Vojvodina
- 2016–2017: Veszprém
- 2017: Göztepe
- 2018–2020: Vojvodina
- 2020–: Jugović
National team
- Years: Team
- 2006–2016: Montenegro
Medal record
Men's handball
Representing Serbia and Montenegro
U21 World Championship
Silver medal – second place	2005 Hungary	Team

Mirko Milašević (Serbian Cyrillic: Мирко Милашевић; born 27 July 1985) is a Montenegrin handball player for Serbian club Jugović.

== Club career ==
After starting out at Jugović, Milašević played for fellow Serbian clubs Vojvodina and Crvena zvezda, before returning to his native Montenegro. He later moved abroad and played for Toledo, Alcobendas, HSC Suhr Aarau, Puerto Sagunto, Billère, Dinamo București, Veszprém and Göztepe.

== International career ==
At youth level, Milašević represented Serbia and Montenegro at the 2005 World Under-21 Championship, as the team finished as runners-up.

A Montenegro international since its inception, Milašević participated at the 2008 European Championship in the nation's debut appearance in major tournaments. He also took part at the 2013 World Championship.

== Honours ==
Vojvodina

- Serbia and Montenegro Handball Super League: 2004–05
- Serbia and Montenegro Handball Cup: 2004–05, 2005–06
- Serbian Handball Super League: 2015–16, 2018–19
- Serbian Handball Cup: 2018–19
- Serbian Handball Super Cup: 2018, 2019

Crvena zvezda

- Serbian Handball Super League: 2006–07, 2007–08
