= Aleksey Rastvortsev =

Russian handball player

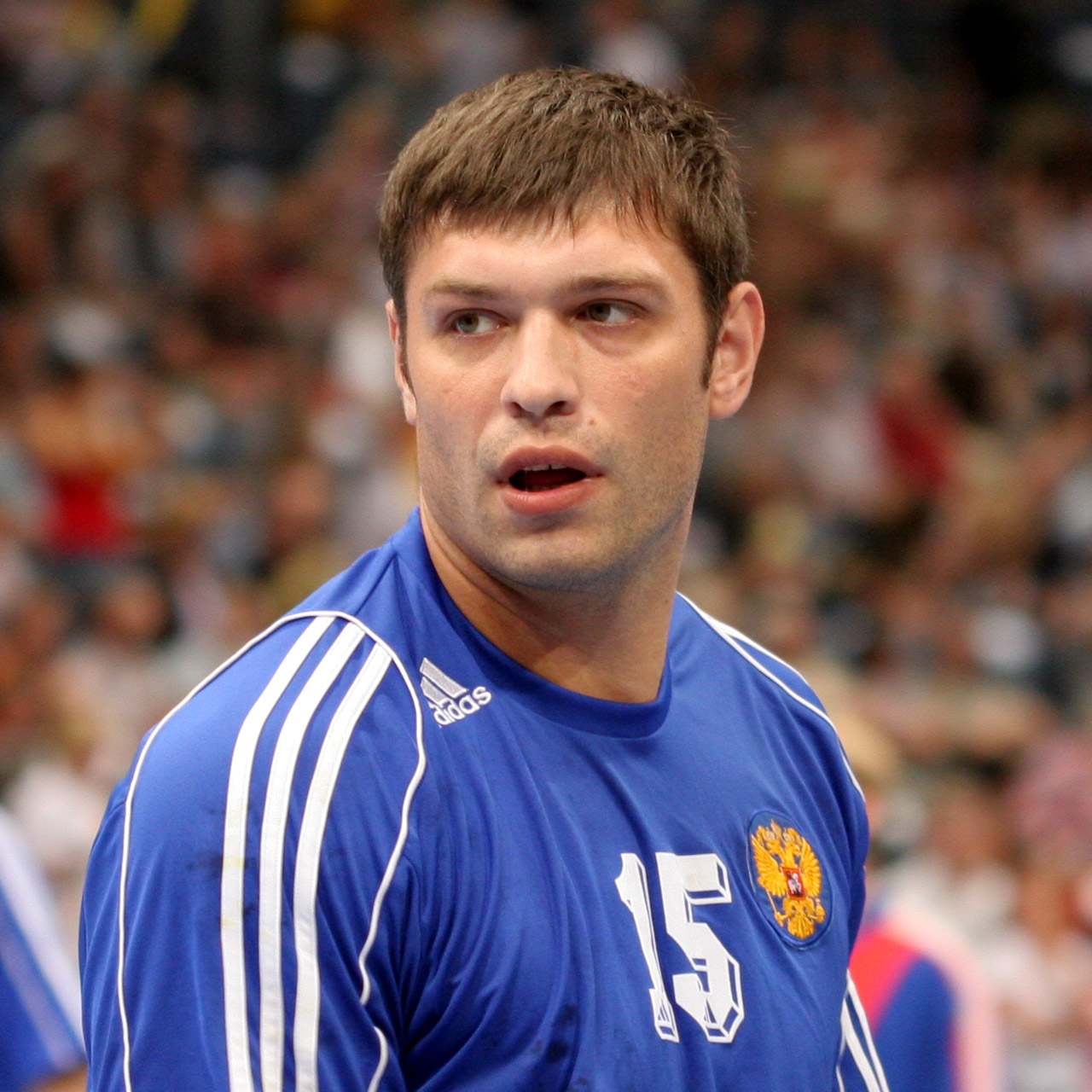
- Rastvortsev in 2008

Personal information
- Born: August 8, 1978 (age 48) Belgorod, Russia
- Height: 200 cm (79 in)

Sport
- Sport: Handball
- Position: left back

Youth career
- Years: Team
- 1989–1995: HC Belgorod

Senior clubs
- Years: Team
- 1995–2003: HC Energija
- 2003–2013: Chekhovskiye Medvedi
- 2013–2015: RK Vardar
- 2015–2016: RK Vojvodina
National team
Years	Team	Apps	(Gls)
1998–2016	Russia	251	(898)
Medal record
Men's handball
Representing Russia
Olympic Games
Bronze medal – third place	2004 Athens	Team

Aleksey Petrovich Rastvortsev (Russian: Алексей Петрович Растворцев; born August 8, 1978) is a Russian handball player who competed in the 2004 Summer Olympics (bronze winner) and in the 2008 Summer Olympics. He played for the Russian National Handball Team 251 match and scored over 900 goals.

== Career ==
In his career he played for HC Neva (St. Peterburg), HC Energija (Voronez),Chekhovskiye Medvedi (Chekhov, Moskovskaja oblast), RK Vardar (Skopje) and RK Vojvodina (Novi Sad). He finished his active sports career in 2016 and since then he is deputy sport director in RK Vardar; they won the EHF Champions League in 2017.

In 2004 he was a member of the Russian team which won the bronze medal in the Olympic tournament. He played all eight matches and scored 40 goals. Four years later he finished sixth with the Russian team in the 2008 Olympic tournament. He played all eight matches again and scored 25 goals.

Aleksey has finished Faculty for Physical Education in 2001 and is pronounced Honorary Master of Sport of Russia in 2004.

- Champion of Russia 10 times with HC Chekhovskie Medvedi 2003–2013
- Champion of Macedonia with RK Vardar season 2014–15
- Champion of Serbia with RK Vojvodina season 2015–16
- Winner of the EHF Cup Winner's Cup season 2005–06
- EHF Champions League Final 4 season 2009–10
- Winner of SEHA League season 2013–14
- Winner of the Intercontinental Cup 2002 in Russia.

== Incident ==
On 6 December 2015 players and staff of RK Vojvodina were travelling by plane from Portugal, where RK Vojvodina had lost an EHF Champions League game against FC Porto, back to Serbia. When one of the passengers, a Jordanian citizen with an American passport, tried to break into the plane's cockpit, he was tackled by Rastvortsev and Milan Mirković, club's assistant coach. The passenger stayed calm for the rest of the flight, but he was observed by the player and the coach.
