= Alen Ovčina =

Bosnian handball player (born 1989)

Personal information
- Full name: Alen Ovčina
- Nationality: Bosnian
- Born: 27 February 1989 (age 37) Tuzla, SFR Yugoslavia
- Height: 1.90 m (6 ft 3 in)

Sport
- Sport: Handball
- Position: Left wing
- Current club: Sloboda Tuzla

Youth career
- Years: Team
- –: Sloboda Tuzla

Senior clubs
- Years: Team
- 2006–2009: Sloboda Tuzla
- 2009–2010: Bosna Sarajevo
- 2010–2012: Gračanica
- 2013–2015: Al Shamal
- 2015–2016: Vogošća
- 2016–2018: Antalyaspor
- 2018–2020: Vojvodina
- 2020–: Sloboda Tuzla
National team
- Years: Team
- 2014–: Bosnia and Herzegovina

Alen Ovčina (born 27 February 1989) is a Bosnian handball player for Sloboda Tuzla and the Bosnia and Herzegovina national team.

== Club career ==
Over the course of his career, Ovčina played for Sloboda Tuzla, Bosna Sarajevo, Gračanica, Al Shamal (Qatar), Vogošća, Antalyaspor (Turkey) and Vojvodina (Serbia).

== International career ==
A Bosnia and Herzegovina international since 2014, Ovčina participated at the 2015 World Championship in the nation's debut appearance in major tournaments. He also took part at the 2020 European Championship.

== Honours ==
Vojvodina

- Serbian Handball Super League: 2018–19
- Serbian Handball Cup: 2018–19
- Serbian Handball Super Cup: 2018, 2019
