= Miloš Kostadinović =

Serbian handball player (born 1988)

Personal information
- Full name: Miloš Kostadinović
- Nationality: Serbian
- Born: 2 December 1988 (age 37) Bor, SFR Yugoslavia
- Height: 1.80 m (5 ft 11 in)

Sport
- Sport: Handball
- Position: Right wing
- Current club: Dinamo Pančevo
- Number: 21

Senior clubs
- Years: Team
- –: Železničar Niš
- 2009–2012: Partizan
- 2012–2013: Meshkov Brest
- 2013–2014: Partizan
- 2014–2016: CSM București
- 2016–2018: Steaua București
- 2018–: Dinamo Pančevo
National team
- Years: Team
- 2010–2012: Serbia
Medal record
Men's handball
Representing Serbia
European Championship
Silver medal – second place	2012 Serbia	Team

Miloš Kostadinović (Serbian Cyrillic: Милош Костадиновић; born 2 December 1988) is a Serbian handball player for Dinamo Pančevo.

== Career ==
Kostadinović started out at Železničar Niš, before transferring to Partizan in July 2009. He later played abroad in Belarus (Meshkov Brest) and Romania (CSM București and Steaua București).

At international level, Kostadinović represented Serbia at the 2012 European Men's Handball Championship, winning the silver medal.

== Honours ==
=== Partizan ===
- Serbian Handball Super League: 2010–11, 2011–12
- Serbian Handball Cup: 2011–12
- Serbian Handball Super Cup: 2009, 2011, 2012
