= Nemanja Pribak =

Serbian-Macedonian handball player (born 1984)

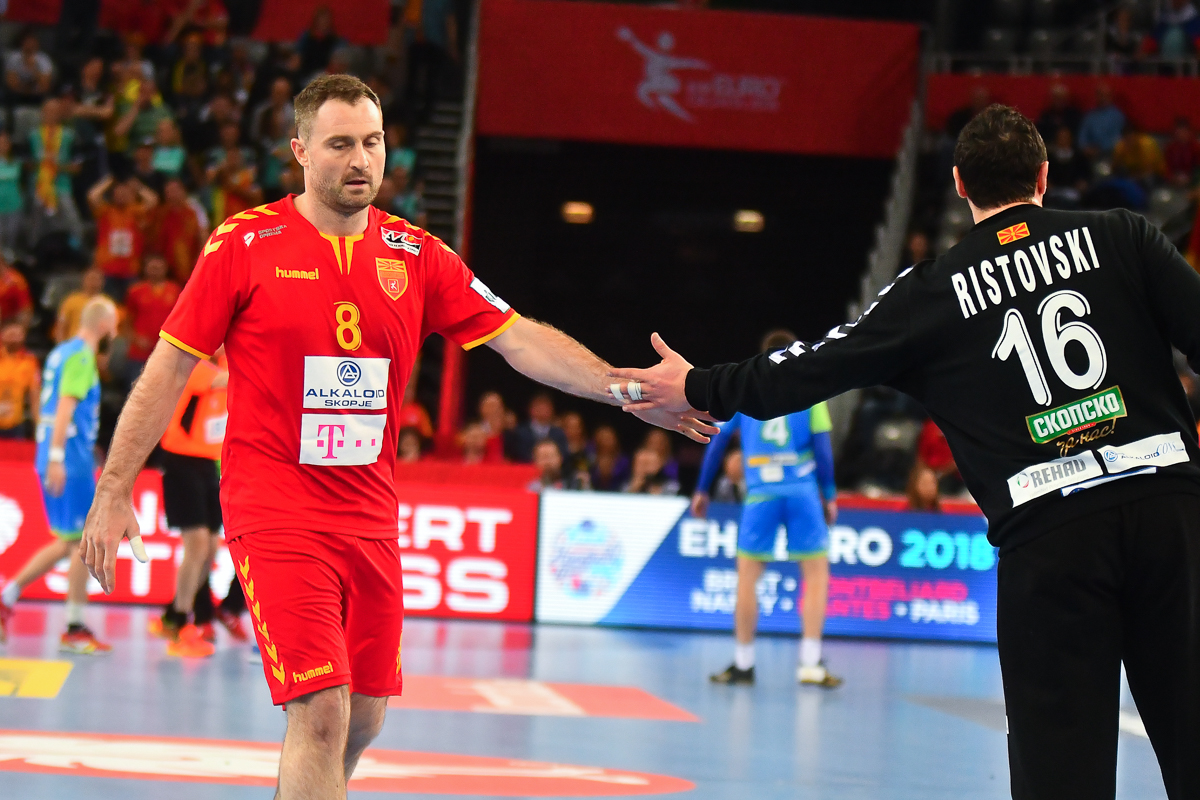

Personal information
- Full name: Nemanja Pribak
- Nationality: Serbian / Macedonian
- Born: 26 March 1984 (age 42) Niš, SFR Yugoslavia
- Height: 1.90 m (6 ft 3 in)

Sport
- Sport: Handball
- Position: Centre back

Senior clubs
- Years: Team
- 2003–2006: Železničar Niš
- 2006–2007: Trimo Trebnje
- 2007–2009: Vardar
- 2009–2010: Kolubara
- 2010–2012: Nantes
- 2012–2015: Vardar
- 2015–2019: Beşiktaş
- 2019–2022: Vojvodina
- 2022–2024: Hapoel Rishon LeZion
National team
- Years: Team
- 2010–2011: Serbia
- 2014–2018: Macedonia

Teams managed
- 2025–present: Serbia (assistant)

Nemanja Pribak (Serbian Cyrillic: Немања Прибак, Macedonian: Немања Прибак; born 26 March 1984) is a Serbian-born Macedonian handball coach and former player. He currently works as assistant coach of the Serbia national team.

== Career ==
After playing for his hometown club Železničar Niš, Pribak moved abroad to Slovenian side Trimo Trebnje in 2006. He also spent two years with Macedonian club Vardar, before returning to Serbia. In the 2009–10 season, Pribak played for Kolubara and helped the club win the Serbian Handball Super League and Serbian Handball Cup for the first time ever.

At international level, Pribak represented Serbia in the 2011 World Men's Handball Championship. He later switched allegiance to Macedonia, making his major debut at the 2014 European Men's Handball Championship.

== Honours ==
Kolubara

- Serbian Handball Cup: 2009–10
- Serbian Handball Super League: 2009–10.

Vojvodina

- Serbian Handball Super League: 2020–21, 2021–22
- Serbian Supercup 2019–20
- Serbian Handball Cup: 2019–20, 2020–21

Vardar

- Macedonian Handball Super League:2008–09 2012–13, 2014–15
- Macedonian Handball Cup: 2007–08, 2013–14, 2014–15,
- SEHA League: 2013–14

Beşiktaş

- Turkish Handball Super League: 2015–16, 2016–17, 2017–18, 2018–19
- Turkish Handball Cup: 2015–16, 2016–17, 2017–18, 2018–19
- Turkish Supercup 2015–16, 2017–18, 2018–19, 2019–20
