= Vuk Lazović =

Serbian-Montenegrin handball player (born 1988)

Personal information
- Full name: Vuk Lazović
- Nationality: Montenegrin
- Born: 10 March 1988 (age 38) Belgrade, SR Serbia, SFR Yugoslavia
- Height: 1.99 m (6 ft 6 in)

Sport
- Sport: Handball
- Position: Pivot

Senior clubs
- Years: Team
- 2006–2010: Partizan
- 2008–2009: → Radnički Kragujevac (loan)
- 2009: → Zaječar (loan)
- 2011–2012: Krško
- 2012–2013: Vardar
- 2013: Slovan
- 2014: Crvena zvezda
- 2014–2015: Vojvodina
- 2015–2017: TuS Nettelstedt-Lübbecke
- 2017–2018: Dunărea Călărași
- 2018–2021: SK Hawks
- 2021–2023: Kuwait SC
- 2023: Partizan
- 2023: Al-Najma
- 2023–2026: Meshkov Brest
National team
| Years | Team | Apps | (Gls) |
| 2015–2025 | Montenegro | 49 | (40) |

Vuk Lazović (Serbian Cyrillic: Вук Лазовић; born 10 March 1988) is a Montenegrin handball player.

== Club career ==
Lazović started out at Partizan and made his Serbian Handball Super League debut in its inaugural 2006–07 season. He was later loaned to Radnički Kragujevac for the 2008–09 season. After a loan spell with Zaječar, Lazović returned to Partizan until the end of the 2009–10 season.

== International career ==
After competing for Serbia in youth tournaments, Lazović accepted a call-up to represent Montenegro at senior level in 2014. He made his debut for the national team in 2015. Later on, Lazović participated in four European Championships (2016, 2018, 2020 and 2022) and one World Championship (2023).

== Personal life ==
Lazović is the son of late actor Danilo Lazović. He is married to fellow handball player Barbara Lazović (née Varlec).

== Honours ==
Partizan

- Serbian Handball Cup: 2006–07, 2007–08

Vardar

- Macedonian Handball Super League: 2012–13

Vojvodina

- Serbian Handball Super League: 2014–15
- Serbian Handball Cup: 2014–15
- Serbian Handball Super Cup: 2014
