= Kasim Kamenica =

Bosnia and Herzegovina handball player

Personal information
- Full name: Kasim Kamenica
- Nationality: Bosnian
- Born: 28 October 1954 (age 71) Goražde, FPR Yugoslavia

Sport
- Sport: Handball

Senior clubs
- Years: Team
- 1971–1976: Radnički Goražde
- 1976–1980: Borac Uroševac
- 1980–1982: Železničar Niš

Teams managed
- 1982–1984: Radnički Goražde
- 1984–1985: Borac Uroševac
- 1985–1988: Pelister
- 1987–1989: Yugoslavia (juniors)
- 1988–1991: Zagreb Chromos
- 1991–1992: Partizan
- 1992–1993: Atomic Köflach
- 1993–1996: Kometal Gjorče Petrov
- 1996–1997: Vardar
- 1997–1998: Mladost Bogdanci
- 1998–2003: RD Prule 67
- 2003–2004: Slovenia
- 2004–2005: Bosna Sarajevo
- 2004–2005: Bosnia and Herzegovina
- 2005–2007: Slovenia
- 2006–2007: Celje Pivovarna Laško
- 2008–2013: Nexe Našice
- 2009–2010: Montenegro
- 2013–2014: Lovćen
- 2014–2015: MRK Goražde
- 2016: Zağnos Spor Kulübü
- 2016–2017: Pelister
- 2017: Zagreb
- 2017–2018: Vojvodina
- 2018–2019: Vogošća
Medal record
Head coach for Yugoslavia
U-21 World Championship
Gold medal – first place	1987 Yugoslavia
Bronze medal – third place	1989 Spain
Head coach for Slovenia
European Championship
Silver medal – second place	2004 Slovenia

Kasim Kamenica (born 28 October 1954) is a Bosnian handball coach and former professional player.

== Coaching career ==
Kamenica started his coaching career as the head coach of Radnički Goražde, Borac Uroševac and Pelister. In 1987–88 season, Kamenica worked with Badel 1862 Zagreb till 1991.

As of 2020, Kamenica has coached following teams: Partizan, Atomic Köflach, Kometal Gjorče Petrov, Vardar, Mladost Bogdanci, RD Prule 67, Slovenian national team, Bosna Sarajevo, Bosnia and Herzegovina national team, Celje, Nexe Našice, Montenegrin national team, Lovćen, MRK Goražde, Zağnos Kulübü, Pelister, Zagreb, Vojvodina and Vogošća.

During his stint with Slovenia between 2003 and 2004, Kamenica led the team to the silver medal at the 2004 European Championship.

== Honours ==
=== Player ===
Radnički Goražde

- Yugoslav Third League: 1974–75

Borac Uroševac

- Yugoslav Second League (South): 1976–77, 1977–78

Železničar Niš

- Yugoslav Cup: 1982

=== Coach ===
Yugoslavia U-21

- IHF Men's Junior World Championship: 1987
- IHF Men's Junior World Championship third place: 1989

Badel 1862 Zagreb

- Yugoslav First League: 1988–89, 1990–91
- Yugoslav Cup: 1990–91

Kometal Gjorče Petrov

- Macedonian First League: 1993–94, 1994–95, 1995–96
- Macedonian Cup: 1995, 1996

RD Prule 67

- Slovenian First League: 2001–02
- Slovenian Cup: 2002

Slovenia

- European Championship second place: 2004

Celje Pivovara Laško

- Slovenian First League: 2006–07
- Slovenian Cup: 2007
- Slovenian Super Cup: 2007
- EHF Champions Trophy finalist: 2007

Lovćen

- Montenegrin First League: 2013–14
- Montenegrin Cup: 2014
