= Saeid Heidarirad =

Iranian handball player (born 1990)

Personal information
- Nationality: Iranian/Romanian
- Born: 22 September 1990 (age 36) Selseleh, Iran
- Height: 1.93 m (6 ft 4 in)

Sport
- Sport: Handball
- Position: Goalkeeper
- Current club: RK Eurofarm Pelister
- Number: 32

Senior clubs
- Years: Team
- 2017–2024: Dinamo București
- 2024–2025: RK Partizan AdmiralBet
- 2025–: RK Eurofarm Pelister
National team
Years	Team	Apps	(Gls)
–	Iran	32	(0)

Saeid Heidarirad (Persian: سعید حیدری راد, born 22 September 1990) is an Iranian-born Romanian handball player for RK Eurofarm Pelister.

== Honours ==
Dinamo București

- Romanian Championship: 2017–18, 2018–19, 2020–21, 2021–22, 2022–23, 2023–24
- Romanian Cup: 2020, 2021, 2022, 2024
- Romanian Super Cup: 2018, 2019, 2020, 2022, 2023

Partizan

- Serbian Championship: 2024–25

Eurofarm Pelister

- Macedonian Super Cup: 2025
