= Milan Đukić (handballer) =

Serbian handball player (born 1985)

Personal information
- Nationality: Serbian
- Born: 16 August 1985 (age 41) Kragujevac, SR Serbia, SFR Yugoslavia
- Height: 1.85 m (6 ft 1 in)

Sport
- Sport: Handball
- Position: Right wing
- Current club: Eurofarm Pelister
- Number: 66

Senior clubs
- Years: Team
- –: Radnički Kragujevac
- 2011–2012: Borac Banja Luka
- 2012–2014: Meshkov Brest
- 2014–2015: Borac Banja Luka
- 2016: Radnički Kragujevac
- 2016–2017: Vojvodina
- 2017–2018: Železničar 1949
- 2018–2021: RK Eurofarm Pelister
- 2021–2022: RK Eurofarm Pelister 2
National team
- Years: Team
- –: Serbia

Milan Đukić (Serbian Cyrillic: Милан Ђукић; born 16 August 1985) is a Serbian handball player for Macedonian club Eurofarm Pelister and the Serbia national team.

== Club career ==
After playing for his hometown club Radnički Kragujevac, Đukić moved across the border to Borac Banja Luka in July 2011. He later played for Meshkov Brest from 2012 to 2014, before rejoining Borac Banja Luka. In February 2016, Đukić returned to his parent club Radnički Kragujevac.

== International career ==
At international level, Đukić represented Serbia at the 2020 European Championship.

== Honours ==
Meshkov Brest

- Belarusian Men's Handball Championship: 2013–14
- Belarusian Men's Handball Cup: 2013–14

Borac Banja Luka

- Handball Championship of Bosnia and Herzegovina: 2014–15
- Handball Cup of Bosnia and Herzegovina: 2014–15

Vojvodina

- Serbian Handball Super League: 2016–17
- Serbian Handball Super Cup: 2016
