= Nenad Maksić =

Serbian handball player (born 1972)

Personal information
- Full name: Nenad Maksić
- Nationality: Serbian
- Born: 21 August 1972 (age 54) Smederevo, SR Serbia, SFR Yugoslavia
- Height: 1.88 m (6 ft 2 in)

Sport
- Sport: Handball
- Position: Right back / Right wing
- Current club: Crvena zvezda (head coach)

Youth career
- Years: Team
- –: Smederevo

Senior clubs
- Years: Team
- –: Borac Banja Luka
- 1993–1995: Crvena zvezda
- 1995–2002: Prevent Slovenj Gradec
- 2002–2003: Celje
- 2003–2006: Prevent Slovenj Gradec
- 2006–2007: Crvena zvezda
- 2007: Smederevo
- 2008: Crvena zvezda
- 2008–2010: Smederevo
- 2010–2014: Partizan
National team
- Years: Team
- 1998–2006: Serbia and Montenegro

Teams managed
- 2014–2018: Partizan
- 2018–2020: Al Sadd
- 2020–2022: Partizan
- 2022: Al Rayyan SC
- 2022–2023: Al Sadd
- 2023–2024: Prevent Slovenj Gradec
- 2026–: Crvena zvezda
Medal record
Men's handball
Representing FR Yugoslavia
World Championship
Bronze medal – third place	1999 Egypt	Team
Bronze medal – third place	2001 France	Team

Nenad Maksić (Serbian Cyrillic: Ненад Максић; born 21 August 1972) is a Serbian handball coach and former player.

== Club career ==
After spending two seasons with Crvena zvezda (1993–1995), Maksić moved abroad to Slovenia. He would play for Prevent Slovenj Gradec (10 seasons in two spells; 1995–2002 and 2003–2006) and Celje (one season; 2002–03). In 2006, Maksić returned to Crvena zvezda, helping the club win the Serbian Handball Super League in its inaugural 2006–07 season.

== International career ==
Maksić represented Serbia and Montenegro (known as FR Yugoslavia until 2003) in six major international tournaments, winning two bronze medals at the World Championships (1999 and 2001).

== Honours ==
Crvena zvezda

- Serbian Handball Super League: 2006–07, 2007–08
- Handball Cup of FR Yugoslavia: 1994–95

Celje

- Slovenian First League: 2002–03

Partizan

- Serbian Handball Super League: 2010–11, 2011–12
- Serbian Handball Cup: 2011–12, 2012–13
- Serbian Handball Super Cup: 2011, 2012
