= Dragan Marjanac =

Serbian handball player (born 1985)

Personal information
- Full name: Dragan Marjanac
- Nationality: Serbian
- Born: 26 February 1985 (age 41) Titov Vrbas, SFR Yugoslavia
- Height: 1.92 m (6 ft 4 in)

Sport
- Sport: Handball
- Position: Goalkeeper
- Current club: HSC Suhr Aarau
- Number: 1

Senior clubs
- Years: Team
- 2001–2004: Crvenka
- 2004: Crvena zvezda
- 2005: Fidelinka
- 2006: Vojvodina
- 2006–2007: Partizan
- 2007–2010: Pick Szeged
- 2010: Toledo
- 2011: Bosna Sarajevo
- 2011–2018: BSV Bern
- 2018–: HSC Suhr Aarau
National team
- Years: Team
- 2006–2019: Serbia
Medal record
Men's handball
Representing Serbia and Montenegro
U21 World Championship
| Silver medal – second place | 2005 Hungary | Team |
Representing Serbia
European Championship
| Silver medal – second place | 2012 Serbia | Team |
Mediterranean Games
| Gold medal – first place | 2009 Pescara | Team |

Dragan Marjanac (Serbian Cyrillic: Драган Марјанац; born 26 February 1985) is a Serbian handball player for Swiss club HSC Suhr Aarau.

== Club career ==
After playing for Vojvodina and Partizan, Marjanac went abroad and spent three seasons with Pick Szeged (2007–2010). He then briefly played for Toledo and Bosna Sarajevo. In 2011, Marjanac moved to Switzerland and joined BSV Bern. He spent seven seasons with the club before switching to HSC Suhr Aarau.

== International career ==
At youth level, Marjanac represented Serbia and Montenegro at the 2005 World Under-21 Championship, as the team finished as runners-up.

A full Serbia international since its inception, Marjanac represented the nation in five major tournaments, winning the silver medal at the 2012 European Championship.

== Honours ==
Partizan

- Serbian Handball Cup: 2006–07

Pick Szeged

- Magyar Kupa: 2007–08
