= Dragan Sudžum =

Serbian handball player (born 1978)

Personal information
- Full name: Dragan Sudžum
- Nationality: Serbian
- Born: 28 April 1978 (age 48) Novi Sad, SR Serbia, SFR Yugoslavia
- Height: 1.82 m (6 ft 0 in)

Sport
- Sport: Handball
- Position: Left wing

Senior clubs
- Years: Team
- –: Sintelon
- 2003–2005: Partizan
- 2005–2007: TuS Nettelstedt-Lübbecke
- 2007–2008: Partizan
- 2008–2009: Pilotes Posada
- 2010–2012: Vojvodina
- 2012–2013: Jugović
- 2013–2015: Lavovi BP
- 2016: Lavovi BP
National team
- Years: Team
- 1998–2006: Serbia and Montenegro
- 2007: Serbia

Teams managed
- 2016–2017: Lavovi BP
- 2018–2019: Lavovi BP
- 2019–2020: Hercegovac Gajdobra
Medal record
Men's handball
Representing FR Yugoslavia
World University Championship
Gold medal – first place	1998 Novi Sad	Team

Dragan Sudžum (Serbian Cyrillic: Драган Суџум; born 28 April 1978) is a Serbian handball coach and former player.

== Club career ==
Over the course of his career that spanned two decades, Sudžum played for Sintelon, Partizan (two spells), TuS Nettelstedt-Lübbecke (Germany), Pilotes Posada (Spain), Vojvodina, Jugović, and Lavovi BP.

In March 2016, Sudžum came out of retirement to play for his former club Lavovi BP.

== International career ==
At international level, Sudžum represented Serbia and Montenegro (previously known as FR Yugoslavia) in four major tournaments, making his debut at the 1998 European Championship.

Sudžum won the gold medal at the 1998 World University Championship.

== Honours ==
Sintelon

- Handball Cup of FR Yugoslavia: 1999–2000

Partizan

- Serbian Handball Cup: 2007–08

Vojvodina

- Serbian Handball Cup: 2010–11
