= Šandor Hodik =

Serbian-Macedonian handball player (born 1965)

Personal information
- Full name: Šandor Hodik
- Nationality: Serbian / Macedonian
- Born: 21 September 1965 (age 61) SFR Yugoslavia
- Height: 1.86 m (6 ft 1 in)

Sport
- Sport: Handball
- Position: Goalkeeper

Senior clubs
- Years: Team
- –: Potisje Ada
- –: Jugović
- –: Vrbas
- –: Pelister
- –: Kikinda
- 2001–2002: Every Day Orosháza
- 2002–2004: Jugović
- 2004–2005: Vojvodina
- 2005–2006: Debreceni KSE
- 2006–2007: Proleter Zrenjanin
- 2007–2008: Sloga Doboj
- 2008–2009: Kolubara
- 2009–2010: Vojvodina
- 2019: Kikinda
- 2019–2020: Potisje Ada
National team
- Years: Team
- 1998–2004: Macedonia

Šandor Hodik (Serbian Cyrillic: Шандор Ходик, Macedonian: Шандор Ходик; born 21 September 1965) is a Serbian-Macedonian handball player of ethnic Hungarian descent.

== Club career ==
Over the course of his career that spanned over 35 years, Hodik played for numerous teams, most notably Pelister. He also had multiple spells at both Jugović and Vojvodina. After playing for Sloga Doboj of Bosnia and Herzegovina, Hodik returned to Serbia and helped Kolubara win the national cup in the 2008–09 season.

In March 2019, six months shy of his 54th birthday, Hodik came out of retirement to help his former club Kikinda in the Serbian Handball Super League. He would play for his parent club Potisje Ada in the 2019–20 season.

== International career ==
While playing for Pelister, Hodik accepted a call-up to represent Macedonia, making his major debut at the 1998 European Championship. He also participated in the 1999 World Championship.

== Honours ==
Pelister

- Macedonian Handball Super League: 1997–98
- Macedonian Handball Cup: 1997–98, 1998–99

Vojvodina

- Serbia and Montenegro Handball Super League: 2004–05
- Serbia and Montenegro Handball Cup: 2004–05

Kolubara

- Serbian Handball Cup: 2008–09
