= Drago Jovović =

Serbian handball player (1954-2002)

Personal information
- Full name: Drago Jovović
- Nationality: Serbian
- Born: 2 December 1954 FPR Yugoslavia
- Died: 2002
- Height: 1.95 m (6 ft 5 in)

Sport
- Sport: Handball

Senior clubs
- Years: Team
- –: Vrbas
- –: Crvenka
- –: Sloga Doboj
National team
- Years: Team
- –: Yugoslavia
Medal record
Men's handball
Representing Yugoslavia
Mediterranean Games
Gold medal – first place	1979 Split	Team

Drago Jovović (Serbian Cyrillic: Драго Јововић; 2 December 1954 – 2002) was a Serbian handball player who competed for Yugoslavia in the 1980 Summer Olympics.

== Club career ==
Jovović started out at Vrbas before moving to Crvenka. He also played for Sloga Doboj, helping the club reach the European Cup Winners' Cup final in the 1983–84 season.

== International career ==
At international level, Jovović represented Yugoslavia at the 1980 Summer Olympics.
