= 2016–17 Serbian Handball Super League =

Merkur osiguranje Handball Superleague
- Season: 2016–17
- Champions: RK Vojvodina (5th title)
- Relegated: RK Jugović; RK Morava
- EHF Cup: RK Vojvodina; RK Dinamo Pančevo
- EHF Challenge Cup: RK Sloga Požega; ORK Samot 65
- All statistics correct as of 29 July 2017.

The 2016–17 Merkur osiguranje Handball Superleague is the 11th season of the Handball League of Serbia, Serbian's top-tier handball league. A total of twelve teams contest this season's league. RK Vojvodina are the defending champions and won there 5th title in row.

== Format ==
The competition format for the 2016–17 season consists of a home-and-away double round-robin system. The first six teams qualifies for play-offs, while the last six plays for relegation. The last two teams of this relegation round are relegated.

== Teams ==
2016–17 Merkur osiguranje Handball Superleague

The following 12 clubs compete in the Serbian SuperLiga during the 2016–17 season.

Team	City	Arena
Crvena zvezda	Belgrade	SC Šumice
Dinamo	Pančevo	SC Strelište
Jugović	Kać	Hram Sport Hall
Metaloplastika	Šabac	Hala Zorka
Morava	Velika Plana	TSC Nikola Tesla
Partizan	Belgrade	SC Banjica
Požarevac	Požarevac	SC Pozarevac
Rudar	Kostolac	SC Kostolac
Samot 65	Aranđelovac	SRC Šumadija
Sloga	Požega	Hala sportova Požega
Spartak Vojput	Subotica	Hala sportova u Subotici
Vojvodina	Novi Sad	SC Slana Bara

== Regular season ==
=== Standings ===
Pos	Team	Pld	W	D	L	GF	GA	GD	Pts	Qualification
1	Vojvodina	22	16	1	5	652	582	+70	33	Championship Round
2	Crvena zvezda	22	15	2	5	650	598	+52	32	Championship Round
3	Spartak Vojput	22	15	1	6	598	510	+88	31	Championship Round
4	Dinamo	22	15	1	6	612	541	+71	31	Championship Round
5	Sloga	22	13	1	8	652	621	+31	27	Championship Round
6	Samot 65	22	12	2	8	598	586	+12	26	Championship Round
7	Rudar	22	7	5	10	590	596	−6	19	Relegation Round
8	Partizan	22	7	4	11	590	630	−40	18	Relegation Round
9	Metaloplastika	22	7	3	12	568	593	−25	17	Relegation Round
10	Požarevac	22	5	4	13	593	649	−56	14	Relegation Round
11	Morava	22	4	3	15	583	669	−86	11	Relegation Round
12	Jugović	22	2	1	19	523	634	−111	5	Relegation Round

Source: SuperLiga

=== Results ===
Home \ Away	CRV	DIN	JUG	MET	MOR	PAR	POZ	RUD	SAM	SLO	SPA	VOJ
Crvena zvezda		27–25	32–29	31–26	33–25	34–27	31–23	33–26	37–30	24–31	27–23	24–23
Dinamo	27–25		31–23	28–18	31–25	31–26	36–31	32–23	28–26	28–23	19–18	25–28
Jugović	24–24	22–31		19–25	26–20	25–30	26–29	21–19	21–24	26–27	19–32	26–29
Metaloplastika	28–33	20–19	24–23		34–22	23–23	33–22	25–26	23–26	30–32	21–22	34–31
Morava	29–29	26–33	27–26	29–34		28–28	33–34	24–27	25–28	27–20	24–30	31–30
Partizan	33–34	28–29	32–30	31–31	30–32		29–25	24–22	25–23	28–27	26–37	27–26
Požarevac	29–34	27–30	28–25	22–22	29–29	31–25		28–31	31–31	26–28	21–27	26–32
Rudar	26–27	29–29	33–23	28–20	26–25	30–30	24–24		35–23	30–30	23–26	28–29
Samot 65	27–26	20–31	36–26	32–27	25–21	25–19	31–23	28–23		34–28	23–21	23–23
Sloga	29–32	26–25	38–20	34–29	40–29	31–26	27–26	39–28	30–28		28–24	24–30
Spartak Vojput	29–26	23–21	24–17	30–19	37–24	25–20	34–24	25–25	31–25	37–30		23–26
Vojvodina	29–27	27–23	39–26	30–22	39–28	31–23	31–34	31–28	32–30	34–30	22–20	

Source: flashscore.com
Legend: Blue = home team win; Yellow = draw; Red = away team win.

== Championship Round ==
Teams begin this round with points acquired against the five other teams of this round during the regular season :

- Vojvodina : 17 pts
- Crvena zvezda : 10 pts
- Dinamo : 10 pts
- Spartak Vojput : 8 pts
- Sloga : 8 pts
- Samot 65 : 7 pts

Pos	Team	Pld	W	D	L	GF	GA	GD	Pts	Qualification
1	Vojvodina	20	13	3	4	567	517	+50	29	2017–18 SEHA League
2	Dinamo	20	11	1	8	529	487	+42	23	2017–18 SEHA League
3	Crvena zvezda	20	10	3	7	549	523	+26	23	
4	Spartak Vojput	20	9	1	10	501	504	−3	19	
5	Sloga	20	8	1	11	558	583	−25	17	
6	Samot 65	20	4	1	15	513	603	−90	9	

Source: SuperLiga

== Relegation round ==
Teams begin this round with points acquired against the five other teams of this round during the regular season :

- Rudar : 14 pts
- Metaloplastika : 13 pts
- Partizan : 12 pts
- Požarevac : 11 pts
- Morava : 6 pts
- Jugović : 4 pts

Pos	Team	Pld	W	D	L	GF	GA	GD	Pts	Qualification
1	Metaloplastika	20	14	3	3	583	534	+49	31	
2	Rudar	20	10	2	8	584	547	+37	22	
3	Partizan	20	9	4	7	591	580	+11	22	
4	Požarevac	20	7	3	10	568	592	−24	17	
5	Morava	20	6	2	12	558	591	−33	14	Relegation
6	Jugović	20	7	0	13	518	558	−40	14	Relegation

Source: SuperLiga
