= RK Vrbas =

Serbian handball club

- Full name: Rukometni klub Vrbas
- Founded: 1955
- Arena: CFK Vrbas
- Capacity: 2,500
- League: Serbian Handball Super B League
- 2019–20: Annulled due to the COVID-19 pandemic
- Club colours
Home	Away

RK Vrbas (Serbian Cyrillic: РК Врбас) is a Serbian handball club based in Vrbas. They compete in the Serbian Handball Super B League.

== History ==
The club was established in 1955. They made their Yugoslav Handball Championship debut in the 1988–89 season. The club reached the EHF Cup round of 16 in the 1995–96 season. They competed in the Serbian Handball Super League from 2006 to 2008 and from 2012 to 2014.

== Sponsorship ==
During its history, the club has been known by a variety of names due to sponsorship reasons:

- Vrbas Figrad
- Vrbas Vital
- Vrbas Carnex
- Vrbas Petrol

== Notable players ==
The list includes players who played for their respective national teams in any major international tournaments, such as the Olympic Games, World Championships and European Championships:

- (Montenegro) Golub Doknić
- (North Macedonia) Šandor Hodik
- (Serbia) Uroš Elezović
- (Serbia) Miloš Orbović
- (Serbia) Aleksandar Stojanović
- (Serbia and Montenegro) Goran Arsenić
- (Serbia and Montenegro) Jovan Kovačević
- (Serbia and Montenegro) Dragan Momić
- (Socialist Federal Republic of Yugoslavia) Jovica Elezović
- (Socialist Federal Republic of Yugoslavia) Drago Jovović

== Head coaches ==
- (Socialist Federal Republic of Yugoslavia) Branislav Kustudić
- (Socialist Federal Republic of Yugoslavia) Jovica Elezović
- (Serbia) Vladimir Vojvodić
- (Serbia) Veselin Kilibarda
