= Jovica Elezović =

Serbian handball player (born 1956)

Personal information
- Full name: Jovica Elezović
- Nationality: Serbian
- Born: 2 March 1956 (age 70) Vrbas, PR Serbia, FPR Yugoslavia
- Height: 1.94 m (6 ft 4 in)

Sport
- Sport: Handball
- Position: Left back

Senior clubs
- Years: Team
- –1976: Vrbas
- 1976–1977: Crvenka
- 1977–1984: Borac Banja Luka
- 1984–1985: Proleter Zrenjanin
- 1985–1986: Reinickendorfer Füchse
- 1986–1989: TuS Hofweier
- 1989–1990: TUSEM Essen
- 1990–1991: Cajamadrid
National team
Years	Team	Apps	(Gls)
–	Yugoslavia	123	(388)

Teams managed
- 1991–1992: Vrbas
- 1992–1995: Partizan
- 1995–1996: Partizan
- 1997: FR Yugoslavia
- 1998–1999: Partizan
- 1999–2000: Cantabria
- 2000–2003: Sintelon
- –: Sintelon
- 2006: Serbia and Montenegro
- 2007: Bosna Sarajevo
Medal record
Men's handball
Representing Yugoslavia
Olympic Games
Gold medal – first place	1984 Los Angeles	Team
World Championship
Gold medal – first place	1986 Switzerland	Team
Silver medal – second place	1982 West Germany	Team
Mediterranean Games
Gold medal – first place	1983 Casablanca	Team

Jovica Elezović (Serbian Cyrillic: Јовица Елезовић; born 2 March 1956) is a Serbian former handball coach and player who competed for Yugoslavia in the 1980 Summer Olympics and in the 1984 Summer Olympics.

== Club career ==
Elezović started playing handball for his hometown club Vrbas at the age of 19. He also spent one season with Crvenka, before joining Borac Banja Luka in 1977. Over the years, Elezović established himself as one of the best players in Yugoslavia, helping his team win the championship in the 1980–81 season. He also played with Proleter Zrenjanin for one season, before going abroad.

In 1985, Elezović moved to Germany and signed with Reinickendorfer Füchse. He would also play for fellow German teams TuS Hofweier and TUSEM Essen. Before retiring, Elezović spent one season with Spanish club Cajamadrid.

== International career ==
At international level, Elezović competed for Yugoslavia in two Olympic tournaments, winning the gold medal in 1984. He was also a regular member of the team that won the 1986 World Championship, where they won gold medals, beating Hungary in the final 24-22.

== Coaching career ==
After starting his coaching career at his parent club Vrbas, Elezović spent four seasons as head coach of Partizan, winning three consecutive championships (1992–93, 1993–94, and 1994–95) and two successive cups (1992–93 and 1993–94).

Shortly prior to the 1997 World Championship, Elezović was appointed as head coach for FR Yugoslavia.

== Personal life ==
Elezović is the father of fellow handball player Uroš Elezović.

== Honours ==
=== Player ===
Borac Banja Luka

- Yugoslav Championship: 1980–81
- Yugoslav Cup: 1978–79

=== Coach ===
Partizan

- Championship of FR Yugoslavia: 1992–93, 1993–94, 1994–95, 1998–99
- Cup of FR Yugoslavia: 1992–93, 1993–94, 1997–98
