= Ratko Đurković =

Montenegrin handball player (born 1975)

Personal information
- Full name: Ratko Đurković
- Nationality: Montenegrin
- Born: 9 February 1975 (age 51) Cetinje, SR Montenegro, SFR Yugoslavia
- Height: 1.90 m (6 ft 3 in)

Sport
- Sport: Handball
- Position: Pivot
- Current club: Raimond Sassari

Youth career
- Years: Team
- –: Lovćen

Senior clubs
- Years: Team
- –: Lovćen
- –: Metaloplastika
- 1997–1999: Sintelon
- 1999–2001: Lovćen
- 2001–2003: Partizan
- 2003–2004: Bidasoa
- 2004–2008: Pick Szeged
- 2008–2009: Bosna Sarajevo
- 2009–2010: Lovćen
National team
- Years: Team
- 2000–2006: Serbia and Montenegro
- 2006–2008: Montenegro

Teams managed
- 2010–2011: Lovćen
- 2011: Pelister
- 2014–2016: Komló Sport
- 2016–2017: Borac Banja Luka
- 2019–2021: Orosházi FKSE
- 2021: Al-Qurain
- 2022–2023: Crvena zvezda
- 2025–: Raimond Sassari
Medal record
Men's handball
Representing FR Yugoslavia
World Championship
Bronze medal – third place	2001 France	Team

Ratko Đurković (born 9 February 1975) is a Montenegrin handball coach.

== Club career ==
After starting out at his hometown club Lovćen, Đurković played for fellow Yugoslav teams Metaloplastika and Sintelon, before returning to Lovćen. He helped them win consecutive championships in 2000 and 2001. Subsequently, Đurković added two more championship titles with Partizan (2002 and 2003), before moving abroad. He would go on to play for Bidasoa (2003–2004), Pick Szeged (2004–2008) and Bosna Sarajevo (2008–2009), before returning to Lovćen.

== International career ==
At international level, Đurković competed for Serbia and Montenegro (known as FR Yugoslavia until 2003) in seven major tournaments, winning the bronze medal at the 2001 World Championship. He also participated in the 2000 Summer Olympics. After the split of Serbia and Montenegro, Đurković represented Montenegro at the 2008 European Championship.

== Coaching career ==
With Borac Banja Luka, Đurković won the Handball Championship of Bosnia and Herzegovina in the 2016–17 season.

== Honours ==
=== Player ===
Lovćen

- Handball Championship of FR Yugoslavia: 1999–2000, 2000–01

Partizan

- Handball Championship of FR Yugoslavia: 2001–02, 2002–03

Pick Szeged

- Nemzeti Bajnokság I: 2006–07
- Magyar Kupa: 2005–06, 2007–08

Bosna Sarajevo

- Handball Championship of Bosnia and Herzegovina: 2008–09
- Handball Cup of Bosnia and Herzegovina: 2008–09

=== Coach ===
Borac Banja Luka

- Handball Championship of Bosnia and Herzegovina: 2016–17
