= Milan Jovanović (handballer) =

Serbian handball player (born 1998)

Personal information
- Nationality: Serbian
- Born: 24 January 1998 (age 28) Vrbas, Serbia, FR Yugoslavia
- Height: 1.96 m (6 ft 5 in)

Sport
- Sport: Handball
- Position: Left back

Senior clubs
- Years: Team
- –2018: Vojvodina
- 2018–2022: Fenix Toulouse
- 2023–2024: Metaloplastika
- 2024–2026: Vojvodina
National team
Years	Team	Apps	(Gls)
–	Serbia	5	(8)

Milan Jovanović (born 24 January 1998) is a Serbian handball player who last played for Vojvodina. He also represents the Serbian national team.

He participated at the 2018 European Men's Handball Championship.
