= Dragan Momić =

Serbian handball player (born 1963)

Personal information
- Full name: Dragan Momić
- Nationality: Serbian
- Born: 28 November 1963 (age 62) Vrbas, SR Serbia, SFR Yugoslavia

Sport
- Sport: Handball
- Position: Pivot

Youth career
- Years: Team
- –: Vrbas

Senior clubs
- Years: Team
- –: Vrbas
- 1992–1993: Juventud Alcalá
- 1993–1994: Partizan
- –: Vrbas
- 1999–2000: Partizan
- –: Vrbas
National team
- Years: Team
- 1995–1997: FR Yugoslavia
Medal record
Men's handball
Representing FR Yugoslavia
European Championship
Bronze medal – third place	1996 Spain	Team

Dragan Momić (Serbian Cyrillic: Драган Момић; born 28 November 1963) is a Serbian former handball player.

== Club career ==
Momić started out at his hometown club Vrbas. He moved abroad to Liga ASOBAL team Juventud Alcalá in 1992. After a year in Spain, Momić returned to his homeland and agreed terms with Partizan. He helped them win the domestic double in the 1993–94 season.

After spending several seasons with his parent club Vrbas in the mid-to-late 1990s, Momić rejoined Partizan and appeared in the 1999–2000 EHF Champions League.

== International career ==
At international level, Momić competed for FR Yugoslavia in two major tournaments, winning the bronze medal at the 1996 European Championship.

Momić has been working as Technical Director at RK Vojvodina since 2021. Since then, the team has won the Serbian championship twice and the EHF European Cup 2022/23.

== Honours ==
Partizan

- Handball Championship of FR Yugoslavia: 1993–94
- Handball Cup of FR Yugoslavia: 1993–94
