= Radivoje Ristanović =

Serbian-Montenegrin handball player (born 1982)

Personal information
- Full name: Radivoje Ristanović
- Nationality: Serbian / Montenegrin
- Born: 2 December 1982 (age 43) Belgrade, SFR Yugoslavia
- Height: 2.00 m (6 ft 7 in)

Sport
- Sport: Handball
- Position: Goalkeeper

Youth career
- Years: Team
- –: Partizan

Senior clubs
- Years: Team
- 2001–2004: Partizan
- 2004–2005: Lovćen
- 2005: Vojvodina
- 2005–2008: Lovćen
- 2008–2009: Teucro
- 2009: Ademar León
- 2009–2012: San Antonio
- 2012–2013: Al Ahli Doha
- 2013–2014: Partizan
- 2014–2016: HBW Balingen-Weilstetten
- 2016: Chambéry
- 2016–2017: Balatonfüredi KSE
- 2017–2018: Maccabi Rishon LeZion
- 2018–2021: Zagreb
- 2021–2023: RK Trimo Trebnje
National team
- Years: Team
- 2015–2016: Montenegro

Radivoje Ristanović (Serbian Cyrillic: Радивоје Ристановић; born 2 December 1982) is a Serbian-Montenegrin former handball player.

== Club career ==
During his journeyman career, Ristanović played in Serbia (Partizan and Vojvodina), Montenegro (Lovćen), Spain (Teucro, Ademar León, and San Antonio), Qatar (Al Ahli Doha), Germany (HBW Balingen-Weilstetten), France (Chambéry), Hungary (Balatonfüredi KSE), Israel (Maccabi Rishon LeZion), and Croatia (Zagreb).

== International career ==
Ristanović was capped for the Serbia national B team, before accepting a call-up to represent Montenegro in 2015. He participated at the 2016 European Championship.

== Honours ==
Partizan

- Handball Championship of FR Yugoslavia: 2001–02, 2002–03

Lovćen

- Montenegrin Men's Handball First League: 2006–07

Zagreb

- Croatian Handball Premier League: 2018–19
- Croatian Handball Cup: 2018–19
