= RK Kolubara =

Serbian handball club

- Full name: Rukometni klub Kolubara
- Nickname: Krtice (The Moles)
- Founded: 1960
- Arena: SRC Kolubara
- President: Milan Trivić
- Head coach: Aleksandar Marjanovic
- League: Serbian Handball Super A League
- 2024-25: Annulled due to the COVID-19 pandemic
- Club colours
Home	Away

RK Kolubara (Serbian Cyrillic: РК Колубара) is a Serbian handball club based in Lazarevac. They compete in the Serbian Handball Super A League.

== History ==
The club was founded in 1960. They made their Serbian Handball Super League debut in its inaugural 2006–07 season. The club subsequently finished as runners-up twice in a row (2007–08 and 2008–09). They would win their first trophy by capturing the Serbian Cup in May 2009. In the next 2009–10 season, the club successfully defended the national cup and secured its first ever national championship. They also participated in the EHF Cup Winners' Cup (2009–10 and 2010–11), EHF Challenge Cup (2007–08 and 2011–12) and EHF Cup (2008–09).

== Team ==
=== Current squad ===
Squad for the 2025–26 season

Goalkeepers
Left Wingers
Right Wingers
Line players

Left Backs
Central Backs
Right Backs

=== Transfers ===
Transfers for the 2025–26 season

Joining

Leaving

- (Serbia) Uroš Stanić (LB) to (Serbia) RK Crvena zvezda
- (Serbia) Andrija Vesković (CB) to (Serbia) RK Šamot

== Honours ==
Serbian League

- 2009–10

Serbian Cup

- 2008–09, 2009–10

== Notable players ==
The list includes players who played for their respective national teams in any major international tournaments, such as the Olympic Games, World Championships and European Championships:

- (Hungary) (Serbia and Montenegro) Nenad Puljezević
- (Montenegro) Golub Doknić
- (Montenegro) Aleksandar Glendža
- (Montenegro) Mladen Rakčević
- (North Macedonia) Šandor Hodik
- (North Macedonia) (Serbia) Nemanja Pribak
- (Serbia) (Serbia and Montenegro) Momir Ilić
- (Serbia and Montenegro) Nedeljko Jovanović

== Head coaches ==
- (Serbia) Vladimir Dragićević
- (Serbia) Saša Vučeljić (2014–2015)
- (Serbia) Vladimir Dragićević (2016–present)
