= RK Radnički Kragujevac =

RK Radnički
- Full name: Rukometni klub Radnički
- Nickname: Crveni Đavoli (The Red Devils)
- Founded: 1964; 62 years ago
- Arena: Jezero Hall, Kragujevac
- Capacity: 3,570
- Head coach: Dejan Radević (men's team); Rodoljub Kurandić (women's team)
- League: Serbian Handball Super League; Serbian First League for Women
Home	Away

Rukometni klub Radnički (Serbian Cyrillic: Рукометни клуб Раднички), commonly referred to as Radnički Kragujevac, is a men's and women's professional handball club based in Kragujevac, Serbia. It's a part of the Radnički multi-sports company. The men's team competes in Serbian Handball Super League, while women's team competes in Serbian First League for Women.

== History ==
The club is founded in 1964.

The men's team finished the 2013–14 season occupying the second place with 15 points (same as the defending champion, Vojvodina) in the Serbian Handball Super League play-off. That finish qualified them to compete in the EHF Challenge Cup as well as the SEHA Gazprom League. The men's team finished the 2014–15 season in the Serbian Handball Super League play-off on fifth place with six points, however, getting the chance to compete in the EHF Cup qualifying stage in 2015–16 season due to Partizan dropping out of the competition.

== Notable male players ==
- (Montenegro) Nemanja Grbović
- (Montenegro) Vuk Lazović
- (Serbia) Milan Đukić
- (Serbia) Nemanja Ilić
- (Serbia) Ivan Mošić
- (Serbia) Zoran Nikolić
