= RK Rudar =

Ragbi klub Rudar
- Founded: 1982
- Location: Zenica, Bosnia and Herzegovina
- Ground(s): Sportski center Kamberovića polje
- President: Damir Kukić
- Coach(es): Albin Isaković
Team kit

RK Rudar is a Bosnian rugby club based in Zenica.

== History ==
The club was founded in 1982.
