= RK Sintelon =

Serbian handball club

- Full name: Rukometni klub Sintelon
- Founded: 1952
- Dissolved: 2009
- Arena: SRC Tikvara
- Capacity: 1,200
- Club colours
| Home | Away |

RK Sintelon (Serbian Cyrillic: РК Синтелон) was a Serbian handball club based in Bačka Palanka.

== History ==
The club was founded in 1952 as RK Tekstilac. They changed their name to RK Sintelon in 1970 after being acquired by the textile factory of the same name. In 1994, the club earned promotion to the top flight for the first time ever. They would win their first trophy in June 2000 by capturing the national cup. During the 2002–03 season, the club went through financial difficulties and withdrew from the national championship before the end of the campaign. They returned to the top flight two years later. In 2007, the club changed its name to RK Tarkett due to changes in the club's ownership. They eventually withdrew from the Serbian Handball Super League after the start of the 2009–10 season.

== Honours ==
FR Yugoslavia Cup

- 1999–2000

== Notable players ==
The list includes players who played for their respective national teams in any major international tournaments, such as the Olympic Games, World Championships and European Championships:

- (Montenegro) (Serbia and Montenegro) Ratko Đurković
- (Montenegro) Draško Mrvaljević
- (Qatar) (Serbia and Montenegro) Danijel Šarić
- (Serbia) (Serbia and Montenegro) Danijel Anđelković
- (Serbia) Bojan Beljanski
- (Serbia) Dalibor Čutura
- (Serbia) (Serbia and Montenegro) Nikola Kojić
- (Serbia) (Serbia and Montenegro) Ratko Nikolić
- (Serbia) Žarko Šešum
- (Serbia) Marko Vujin
- (Serbia and Montenegro) Nebojša Golić
- (Serbia and Montenegro) Marko Krivokapić
- (Serbia and Montenegro) Dragan Sudžum

== Head coaches ==
- (Serbia and Montenegro) Branislav Zeljković
- (Serbia and Montenegro) Mile Isaković
- (Serbia and Montenegro) Zoran Kurteš
- (Serbia and Montenegro) Jovica Elezović (2000–2003)
- (Serbia and Montenegro) Predrag Petljanski
- (Serbia) Jovica Elezović
- (Serbia) Aleksandar Savić (2007–2009)
