= RK Vojvodina =

Serbian handball club

- Full name: Rukometni klub Vojvodina
- Nickname: Crveno-beli (The Red-Whites)
- Founded: 1948
- Arena: SC Slana Bara
- Capacity: 2,000
- President: Dušan Bajatović
- Head coach: Milutin Lučić
- League: ARKUS liga; Regional League
- Club colours
Home	Away

RK Vojvodina (Serbian Cyrillic: РК Војводина) is a Serbian professional handball club based in Novi Sad. They compete in the Serbian ARKUS liga and the Regional League.

== History ==
Founded in 1948, the club won the Serbia and Montenegro Handball Super League and Serbia and Montenegro Handball Cup in the 2004–05 season. They later managed to win eleven consecutive Serbian Handball Super League titles between 2013 and 2024.

== Management ==
Position	Name
President	(Serbia) Dušan Bajatović
Vice President	(Serbia) Jovica Budimir
Vice President	(Serbia) Vlada Bobar
Member Of The Board	(Serbia) Marko Vujin
Member Of The Board	(Serbia) Dalibor Đurić
Member Of The Board	(Serbia) Dušan Dumnić

== Team ==
=== Current squad ===
Squad for the 2026–27 season

RK Vojvodina

Goalkeepers

- 1 (Serbia) Dušan Zekić
- 22 (Serbia) Luka Arsenić
- 89 (Serbia) Kosta Dizdar

Left Wingers

- 27 (Serbia) Marko Srdanović (c)

Right Wingers

- 7 (Croatia) Fran Mileta
- 41 (Serbia) Luka Lazić

Line Players

- 2 (Serbia) Mladenko Draško
- 35 (Serbia) Branko Predović

Left Backs

- 17 (Serbia) Đorđe Draško
- 23 (Serbia) Vojin Čabrilo

Central Backs
Right Backs

- 4 (Serbia) Aleksa Radenković
- 6 (Serbia) Milan Milić

=== Technical staff ===
- Head Coach: (Serbia) Milutin Lučić
- Assistant Coach: (Serbia) Milan Mirković
- Goalkeeping Coach: (Serbia) Dejan Aničić
- Fitness Coach: (Serbia) Ilija Medić
- Physiotherapist: (Serbia) Nenad Babić

=== Transfers ===
Transfers for the 2026–27 season

Joining

- (Slovenia) Nik Ćirović (LB) from (Serbia) RK Metaloplastika

Leaving

- (Serbia) Vladan Matić (HC) to (Hungary) Pick Szeged (academy director)
- (Belarus) Viachaslau Saldatsenka (GK) to (Belarus) SKA Minsk
- (Serbia) Bojan Rađenović (LW)
- (Serbia) Miljan Vukovljak (LB) to (Serbia) Jugović
- (Serbia) Miljan Pušica (LB)
- (Serbia) Milan Jovanović (LB)
- (Serbia) Mladen Krsmančić (CB) to (Serbia) MRK Loznica
- (Serbia) Matija Nikolić (CB) to (Greece) Olympiacos
- (Japan) Yuga Enomoto (RB) to (Hungary) Győri ETO-UNI FKC
- (Serbia) Andrija Stankov (LP) to (Croatia) Nexe Našice

=== Transfer History ===
Transfers for the 2025–26 season

Joining

- (Belarus) Viachaslau Saldatsenka (GK) from (Switzerland) GC Amicitia Zürich
- (Japan) Yuga Enomoto (RW) from (Hungary) MOL Tatabánya KC
- (Serbia) Kosta Dizdar (GK) from (Serbia) RK Jugović
- (Serbia) Marko Srdanović (LW) from (North Macedonia) RK Vardar
- (Serbia) Mladen Krsmančić (CB) from (North Macedonia) GRK Ohrid
- (Serbia) Vojin Čabrilo (LB) (from (France) Fenix Toulouse Handball)
- (Serbia) Simo Šijan (CB) (back from loan at (Denmark) Skjern Håndbold)
- (Serbia) Matija Nikolić (CB) (from (North Macedonia) RK Vardar)
- (Serbia) Mladenko Draško (P) (from (Serbia) RK Proleter Zrenjanin)

Leaving

- (Egypt) Ahmed Nafea (LW) to (Germany) HSG Wetzlar
- (Serbia) Andrej Trnavac (GK) to (Serbia) RK Partizan
- (Serbia) Simo Šijan (CB) to (Serbia) RK Partizan
- (Serbia) Jovica Nikolić (RB) to (Kuwait) Burgan SC
- (Serbia) Marko Drasko (GK) to (Serbia) RK Jugović
- (Croatia) Fran Lućin (GK) (to ?)
- (Belarus) Barys Pukhouski (CB) (retires)
- (Slovenia) Miha Kavčič (P) (to ?)
- (Brazil) João Pedro Silva (CB) to (North Macedonia) RK Vardar
- (Serbia) Stefan Dodić (CB) to (Hungary) ONE Veszprém

== Previous squads ==
2018–2019 Team
Shirt No	Nationality	Player	Birth Date	Position
1	Serbia	Jovan Nicić	20 January 2001 (age 25)	Goalkeeper
3	Bosnia and Herzegovina	Alen Ovčina	27 February 1989 (age 37)	Left Winger
5	Serbia	Srđan Milić	25 July 1999 (age 27)	Central Back
6	Serbia	Milan Mirković	7 April 1985 (age 41)	Right Back
10	Bosnia and Herzegovina	Duško Čelica	16 August 1986 (age 40)	Left Back
12	Serbia	Bojan Perović	23 January 1982 (age 44)	Goalkeeper
13	Bosnia and Herzegovina	Nikola Jeremić	25 August 2000 (age 26)	Right Back
15	Serbia	Lazar Anđelković	28 December 2001 (age 24)	Right Winger
16	Serbia	Dimitrije Jelić	9 November 2000 (age 25)	Goalkeeper
19	Serbia	Stefan Ranisavljević	3 February 1997 (age 29)	Right Back
23	Bosnia and Herzegovina	Sasa Marijanać	6 January 1989 (age 37)	Central Back
31	Serbia	Strahinja Stanković	12 June 1991 (age 35)	Right Winger
33	Serbia	Jovica Nikolić	18 November 2001 (age 24)	Right Back
40	Montenegro	Mirko Milašević	27 July 1985 (age 41)	Central Back
69	Serbia	Miloš Grozdanić	18 February 1995 (age 31)	Left Winger

2014–2015 Team
Shirt No	Nationality	Player	Birth Date	Position
1	Serbia	Luka Arsenić	27 November 1993 (age 32)	Goalkeeper
3	Serbia	Boban Živković	28 October 1981 (age 45)	Left Winger
4	Serbia	Miloš Orbović	2 November 1993 (age 33)	Right Back
5	SerbiaMontenegro	Branko Kankaraš	28 May 1988 (age 38)	Line Player
7	Serbia	Bojan Todorović	23 July 1990 (age 36)	Central Back
8	Serbia	Uroš Elezović	28 January 1982 (age 44)	Left Back
10	SerbiaBosnia and Herzegovina	Vladislav Veselinov	21 January 1982 (age 44)	Line Player
11	Bosnia and Herzegovina	Neven Stjepanović	14 February 1993 (age 33)	Right Back
12	Serbia	Bojan Perović	23 January 1982 (age 44)	Goalkeeper
15	Serbia	Srdjan Veljković	10 April 1979 (age 47)	Left Back
16	Serbia	Jovan Kukobat	25 December 1987 (age 38)	Goalkeeper
17	Serbia	Filip Marjanović	10 February 1989 (age 37)	Left Winger
18	Serbia	Vanja Smiljanić	25 August 1996 (age 30)	Right Winger
19	Serbia	Stefan Ranisavljević	3 February 1997 (age 29)	Right Back
20	Serbia	Milan Jovanović	24 January 1998 (age 28)	Left Back
21	Montenegro	Vuk Lazović	10 March 1988 (age 38)	Line Player
22	Serbia	Nikola Arsenić	3 January 1996 (age 30)	Central Back
23	Serbia	Zoran Nikolić	23 February 1991 (age 35)	Line Player
25	Serbia	Ognjen Petrović	25 May 1995 (age 31)	Left Winger
28	Slovenia	Luka Denić	23 March 1991 (age 35)	Left Back
31	Serbia	Strahinja Stanković	12 June 1991 (age 35)	Right Winger
66	Serbia	Mladen Ivanović	27 February 1982 (age 44)	Right Winger
77	Serbia	Miralem Bećirović	4 July 1983 (age 43)	Line Player
78	Georgia	Sergo Datukashvili	28 April 1978 (age 48)	Left Back
81	Serbia	Miroslav Kocić	3 July 1981 (age 45)	Goalkeeper
99	Serbia	Danimir Ćurković	4 January 1984 (age 42)	Left Back

== Honours ==
EHF European Cup

- Winners: 2022–23

National Championships

Serbia and Montenegro League / Serbian League

- Winners (12 – record): 2004–05, 2012–13, 2013–14, 2014–15, 2015–16, 2016–17, 2017–18, 2018–19, 2020–21, 2021–22, 2022–23, 2023–24

National Cups

Serbia and Montenegro Cup / Serbian Cup

- Winners (9): 2004–05, 2005–06, 2010–11, 2014–15, 2018–19, 2019–20, 2020–21, 2022–23, 2024–25
  - Finalists (4): 2015–16, 2017–18, 2021–22, 2023–24.

Serbian Super Cup

- Winners (8): 2013, 2014, 2015, 2016, 2018, 2019, 2023, 2024
  - Finalists (3): 2011, 2017, 2022.

Svesrpski Kup

- Winners (8): 2014, 2016, 2017, 2019, 2021, 2022, 2023, 2024.

Double

- Winners (5): 2004–05, 2014–15, 2018–19, 2020–21, 2022–23

== EHF ranking ==
As of 3 March 2023

Rank	Team	Points
59	(Hungary) Balatonfüredi KSE	102
60	(Austria) Alpla HC Hard	101
61	(Denmark) TTH Holstebro	100
62	(Serbia) RK Vojvodina	100
63	(Cyprus) Sabbianco Anorthosis Famagusta	100
64	(Romania) AHC Potaissa Turda	97
65	(Turkey) Beşiktaş JK	96

== Former club members ==
=== Notable former players ===
- (Serbia) Bojan Beljanski (2020–2021)
- (Serbia) Milan Đukić (2016–2017)
- (Serbia) Uroš Elezović (2013–2015, 2016)
- (Serbia) Aleksandar Gugleta (2015–2016)
- (Serbia) (North Macedonia) Šandor Hodik (2004–2005, 2009–2010)
- (Serbia) Milan Jovanović (2014–2018)
- (Serbia) (Montenegro) Branko Kankaraš (2014)
- (Serbia) Vladimir Mandić (2005, 2008, 2010–2011)
- (Serbia) Dragan Marjanac (2006)
- (Serbia) Filip Marjanović (2014–2016)
- (Serbia) Milan Milić (2022–)
- (Serbia) Milan Mirković (2013–2014, 2018–2019)
- (Serbia) Jovica Nikolić (2017–2022)
- (Serbia) Zoran Nikolić (2013–2016)
- (Serbia) Miloš Orbović (2014–2017)
- (Serbia and Montenegro) Predrag Peruničić (2004–2005)
- (Serbia) Živan Pešić (2016–2017, 2022–)
- (Serbia) (North Macedonia) Nemanja Pribak (2019–2022)
- (Serbia) Rajko Prodanović (2018–2020)
- (Serbia) Miljan Pušica (2012–2014, 2022–)
- (Serbia) Stevan Sretenović (2019–2020)
- (Serbia) Rastko Stojković (2020)
- (Serbia) Dragan Sudžum (2010–2012)
- (Serbia) Svetislav Verkić (2005–2006, 2018–2022)
- (Serbia) Nenad Vučković (2017–2018)
- (Bosnia and Herzegovina) Duško Čelica (2018–2019)
- (Bosnia and Herzegovina) Alen Ovčina (2016–2020)
- (Belarus) Barys Pukhouski (2022–)
- (Croatia) Marin Buneta (2022)
- (Georgia (country)) Sergo Datukashvili (2013–2015, 2016–2018)
- (Montenegro) Vuk Lazović (2014–2015)
- (Serbia and Montenegro) Rade Mijatović (1998–2005)
- (Montenegro) Mirko Milašević (2004–2006, 2016, 2018–2020)
- (Montenegro) (Serbia) Radivoje Ristanović (2005)
- (Montenegro) Marko Simović (2017–2019)
- (Russia) Aleksey Rastvortsev (2015–2016)
- (Slovenia) Gregor Ocvirk (2021–)
- (Tunisia) Ahmed Bedoui (2021–2022)

=== Former coaches ===
Seasons	Coach	Country
2011–2012	Đorđe Ćirković	(Serbia)
2012–2013	Momir Rnić	(Serbia)
2013	Dragan Kukić	(Serbia)
2013–2015	Đorđe Ćirković	(Serbia)
2015–2016	Nikola Marković	(Serbia)
2016–2017	Božo Rudić	(Serbia)
2017	Dragan Kukić	(Serbia)
2017–2018	Kasim Kamenica	(Bosnia and Herzegovina)
2018–	Boris Rojević	(Serbia)
