= RK Železničar 1949 =

Serbian handball club

- Full name: Rukometni klub Železničar 1949
- Founded: September 7, 2009; 16 years ago
- Arena: SC Čair
- Capacity: 4,000
- President: Ljubomir Pavlović
- Head coach: Đorđe Teodorović
- League: Serbian Handball Super League
- 2020/21: 4
- Club colours
Home	Away

RK Železničar 1949 (Serbian Cyrillic: РК Железничар 1949) is a Serbian handball club based in Niš. They compete in the Serbian Handball Super League.

== History ==
The club was formed as RK Naissus on 7 September 2009 by the amalgamation of RK Železničar and ORK Niš. They immediately started competing in the Serbian Handball Super League by inheriting the spot from ORK Niš.

On 5 December 2011, the club changed its name to RK Železničar. They won their first trophy, the Serbian Handball Cup, in the 2013–14 season. After suffering relegation from the top flight in 2016, the club spent the following season without competing.

Ahead of the 2017–18 season, the club received a wild card entry to the Serbian Handball Super League.

== Crest, colours, supporters ==
=== Kits ===
HOME
2019–20

== Honours ==
Yugoslav Cup / Serbia and Montenegro Cup / Serbian Cup

- 1976–77, 1981–82, 1984–85, 1996–97, 1998–99, 2013–14, 2017–18

== Notable players ==
The list includes players who played for their respective national teams in any major international tournaments, such as the Olympic Games, World Championships and European Championships:

- (Bosnia and Herzegovina) Stefan Janković
- (Qatar) Jovo Damjanović
- (Serbia) Darko Đukić
- (Serbia) Milan Đukić
- (Serbia) Dobrivoje Marković
- (Serbia) (Serbia and Montenegro) Ratko Nikolić
- (Serbia) Stevan Sretenović
- (Serbia) Aleksandar Stojanović
- (Montenegro) Svemir Sarcevic

== Head coaches ==
- (Serbia) Vladan Stošić (2009–2010)
- (Serbia) Miloš Stanić (2010–2011)
- (Serbia) Zoran Živković (2011)
- (Serbia) Aleksandar Živković (2011–2012)
- (Serbia) Jovica Cvetković (2012)
- (Serbia) Nikola Marković (2012)
- (Serbia) Jovica Cvetković (2012)
- (Serbia) Nedeljko Vučković (2013)
- (Serbia) Vladimir Stanojević (2013–2014)
- (Serbia) Siniša Prokić (2014)
- (Serbia) Miroslav Đorđević (2014–2015)
- (Serbia) Siniša Prokić (2015)
- (Serbia) Nebojša Bokić (2015–2016)
- (Serbia) Josif Petković (2017–2018)
- (Montenegro) Veselin Vujović (2018–2019)
- (Serbia) Đorđe Teodorović (2019–present)
