= EHF Cup Winners' Cup =

Official competition for men's and women's handball clubs of Europe

- Country: Europe
- Confederation: EHF members
- Most recent champion: (Germany) SG Flensburg (2nd title)
- Most titles: (Spain) FC Barcelona (5 titles)

The EHF Cup Winners' Cup was the official competition for men's and women's handball clubs of Europe that won their national cup, and took place every year. From the 2012–13 season, the men's competition was merged with the EHF Cup.

== Winners ==
Year	Final			Semi-final losers	
Year	Winners	Score	Runners-up		
1975–76; Details	(Spain); BM Granollers	26–24	(West Germany); GW Dankersen	(Norway); IF Oppsal Oslo	(Switzerland); BSV Bern
1976–77; Details	(Soviet Union); MAI Moskva	18–17	(East Germany); SC Magdeburg	(Spain); Atlético Madrid	(Socialist Federal Republic of Yugoslavia); RK Partizan Bjelovar
1977–78; Details	(West Germany); VfL Gummersbach	15–13 (4:6)	(Socialist Federal Republic of Yugoslavia); RK Železničar Niš	(France); ASPTT Metz	(Poland); Anilana Łódź
1978–79; Details	(West Germany); VfL Gummersbach	15–18, 15–11	(East Germany); SC Magdeburg	(Hungary); Tatabánya KC	(Romania); Minaur Baia Mare
1979–80; Details	(Spain); Calpisa	16–18, 20–15	(West Germany); VfL Gummersbach	(Sweden); IK Heim	(Socialist Federal Republic of Yugoslavia); RK Borac Banja Luka
1980–81; Details	(West Germany); TuS Nettelstedt	16–18, 17–14	(East Germany); SC Empor Rostock	(Romania); Minaur Baia Mare	(Socialist Federal Republic of Yugoslavia); Metaloplastika Šabac
1981–82; Details	(East Germany); SC Empor Rostock	22–18, 14–17	(Czechoslovakia); Dukla Prague	(West Germany); VfL Gunzburg	(Iceland); Throttur Reykjavik
1982–83; Details	(Soviet Union); SKA Minsk	24–26, 34–22	(Romania); Dinamo București	(Hungary); Szegedi Volán	(Socialist Federal Republic of Yugoslavia); RK Železničar Niš
1983–84; Details	(Spain); FC Barcelona	24–21	(Socialist Federal Republic of Yugoslavia); RK Sloga Doboj	(Israel); Maccabi Rishon LeZion	(Hungary); Szegedi Volán
1984–85; Details	(Spain); FC Barcelona	23–30, 27–20	(Soviet Union); CSKA Moscow	(Iceland); Víkingur Reykjavík	(Sweden); Lugi Handboll
1985–86; Details	(Spain); FC Barcelona	20–18, 19–21	(West Germany); TV Grosswallstadt	(Hungary); MKB Veszprém KC	(Romania); Minaur Baia Mare
1986–87; Details	(Soviet Union); CSKA Moscow	16–18, 22–17	(Switzerland); Amicitia Zürich	(West Germany); MTSV Schwabing	(Socialist Federal Republic of Yugoslavia); RK Slovan
1987–88; Details	(Soviet Union); SKA Minsk	21–24, 27–15	(West Germany); TV Grosswallstadt	(Czechoslovakia); HCB Karviná	(Socialist Federal Republic of Yugoslavia); RK Medveščak
1988–89; Details	(West Germany); TUSEM Essen	16–17, 19–16	(France); US Créteil Handball	(Spain); CD Bidasoa Irún	(Romania); CS Dinamo București
1989–90; Details	(Spain); GD TEKA Santander	22–24, 23–18	(Sweden); HK Drott Halmstad	(West Germany); VfL Gummersbach	(Hungary); MKB Veszprém KC
1990–91; Details	(Germany); TSV Milbertshofen	15–20, 24–16	(Spain); CD Bidasoa Irún	(Hungary); MKB Veszprém KC	(Spain); CB Cantabria
1991–92; Details	(Hungary); SE Bramac Veszprém	24–14, 27–20	(Germany); TSV Milbertshofen	(Germany); TUSEM Essen	(Denmark); GOG Gudme
1992–93; Details	(France); OM Vitrolles	23–22, 23–21	(Hungary); Fotex Veszprém SE	(Germany); TUSEM Essen	(Greece); Filippos Verias
1993–94; Details	(Spain); FC Barcelona	20–23, 26–14	(France); OM Vitrolles	(Germany); TSV Bayer Dormagen	(Hungary); SC Pick Szeged
1994–95; Details	(Spain); FC Barcelona	31–24, 26–22	(Denmark); GOG Gudme	(Germany); SG Wallau-Massenheim	(Switzerland); Borba Luzern
1995–96; Details	(Germany); TBV Lemgo	24–19 25–26	(Spain); GD TEKA Santander	(North Macedonia); Pelister Bitola	(Serbia and Montenegro); Red Star Belgrade
1996–97; Details	(Spain); Elgorriaga Bidasoa Irun	24–19, 17–19	(Hungary); Fotex Veszprém SE	(Germany); SC Magdeburg	(France); US d'Ivry Handball
1997/98; Details	(Spain); Caja Cantabria Santander	30–15 26–24	(Germany); HSG Dutenhofen/Münchholzhausen	(Norway); Viking	(Russia); HC Lokomotiv-Polyot Cheljabinsk
1998–99; Details	(Spain); Prosesa Ademar León	19–20, 32–23	(Spain); Caja Cantabria Santander	(North Macedonia); RK Vardar Vatrostalna Skopje	(Serbia and Montenegro); Partizan Beograd
1999–2000; Details	(Spain); Portland San Antonio	28–19 20–26	(Hungary); Dunaferr Sportegyesület	(Denmark); Kolding IF	(Slovenia); Prule 67 Ljubljana
2000–01; Details	(Germany); SG Flensburg-Handewitt	32–25, 19–24	(Spain); CB Ademar León	(Spain); BM Valladolid	(Germany); TV Grosswallstadt
2001–02; Details	(Spain); BM Ciudad Real	31–22, 27–32	(Germany); SG Flensburg-Handewitt	(Hungary); Dunaferr SE	(Serbia and Montenegro); Partizan Beograd
2002–03; Details	(Spain); BM Ciudad Real	33–27, 24–24	(Sweden); Redbergslids IK	(Germany); TBV Lemgo	(Slovenia); Celje
2003–04; Details	(Spain); Portland San Antonio	31–30 30–26	(Spain); BM Valladolid	(Germany); TUSEM Essen	(Slovenia); Gorenje
2004–05; Details	(Spain); CB Ademar León	37–25, 31–25	(Croatia); Zagreb	(Bosnia and Herzegovina); HRK Izviđač Ljubuški	(North Macedonia); RK Vardar Vatrostalna Skopje
2005–06; Details	(Russia); Chekhovskiye Medvedi	29–36, 32–24	(Spain); BM Valladolid	(Germany); HSG Nordhorn	(Romania); HCM Constanta
2006–07; Details	(Germany); HSV Hamburg	28–24, 33–37	(Spain); CB Ademar León	(Bosnia and Herzegovina); RK "Bosna" Sarajevo	(Croatia); RK Zagreb
2007–08; Details	(Hungary); MKB Veszprém KC	37–32, 28–28	(Germany); Rhein-Neckar Löwen	(Switzerland); Kadetten Schaffhausen	(Spain); BM Valladolid
2008–09; Details	(Spain); BM Valladolid	30–31, 24–23	(Germany); HSG Nordhorn	(Switzerland); ZMC Amicitia Zürich	(Switzerland); Kadetten Schaffhausen
2009–10; Details	(Germany); VfL Gummersbach	34–25, 33–37	(Spain); BM Granollers	(Spain); SDC San Antonio	(Romania); Steaua MFA București
2010–11; Details	(Germany); VfL Gummersbach	30–28, 26–26	Tremblay en France	(Spain); Amaya Sport San Antonio	(North Macedonia); RK Vardar PRO
2011–12; Details	(Germany); SG Flensburg-Handewitt	34–33, 32–28	(Germany); VfL Gummersbach	(Spain); CAI BM Aragon	(Slovenia); Celje

=== By country ===
Rank	Country	Winners	Runners-up	Finals Total
1	Spain	17	8	25
2	Germany; East Germany	11; 1; 12	10; 3; 13	21; 4; 25
3	Soviet Union; Russia	2; 1; 3	1; 0; 1	3; 1; 4
4	Hungary	2	3	5
5	Belarus	2	0	2
6	France	1	3	4
7	Sweden	0	2	2
8	(Bosnia and Herzegovina) Bosnia & Herzegovina	0	1	1
8	Croatia	0	1	1
8	Czech Republic	0	1	1
8	Denmark	0	1	1
8	Romania	0	1	1
8	Serbia	0	1	1
8	Switzerland	0	1	1
Total		37	37	74

== See also ==
- EHF Women's Cup Winners' Cup
