= RK Partizan =

Serbian handball club

- Full name: Rukometni klub Partizan
- Nickname: Crno-beli (The Black-Whites)
- Founded: 1948; 78 years ago
- Arena: SC Voždovac
- Capacity: 2,300
- Head coach: Marko Pavlović
- League: ARKUS liga Regional League
- 2025–26: 1st
- Club colours
Home	Away

RK Partizan (Serbian Cyrillic: РК Партизан) is a Serbian handball club based in Belgrade. They compete in the Serbian ARKUS liga and the Regional League.

== History ==
The original club was founded in 1948. They competed for only a year until 1949. In January 1957, RK Dedinje became part of the Partizan sports society, thus reinstating the club's handball section. They made their Yugoslav Handball Championship debut in 1960. In 1973, the club suffered relegation from the league. They made a comeback to the top flight in 1991, shortly before the withdrawal of Croatian and Slovenian teams due to the Yugoslav Wars. The club would win three consecutive championships in 1993, 1994 and 1995, including back-to-back doubles in 1993 and 1994. They later participated in the EHF Champions League on five occasions (1999–2000, 2003–04, 2011–12, 2012–13 and 2026–27). The club also reached the semi-finals of the EHF Cup Winners' Cup (1998–99 and 2001–02) and EHF Challenge Cup (2010–11). After thirteen years, in the 2026/27 season, Partizan received a special invitation to compete in the Champions League.

== Honours ==
Serbia and Montenegro League / Serbian League (11)

- 1992–93, 1993–94, 1994–95, 1998–99, 2001–02, 2002–03, 2008–09, 2010–11, 2011–12, 2024–25, 2025–26

Yugoslav Winter Championship (1)

- 1963

Yugoslav Cup / Serbia and Montenegro Cup / Serbian Cup (13) record

- 1958–59, 1965–66, 1970–71, 1992–93, 1993–94, 1997–98, 2000–01, 2006–07, 2007–08, 2011–12, 2012–13, 2023–24, 2025–26

Serbian Super Cup (5)

- 2009, 2011, 2012, 2025–26, 2026

All-Serbian Cup (2)

- 2025–26, 2026

== Sponsorship ==
During its history, the club has been known by a variety of names due to sponsorship reasons:

- Partizan MAG (1992–1996)
- Partizan Si&Si (2005–2009)
- Partizan Dunav osiguranje (2009–2010)

== Supporters ==
Grobari (Serbian: Гробари, lit. 'Gravediggers or Undertakers') are one of two major football fan groups in Serbia. They generally support all clubs within the Partizan multi-sports club, and mostly wear black and white symbols, which are the club's colours.

== Team ==
=== Current squad ===
Squad for the 2026–27 season

RK Partizan

Goalkeepers

- 1 (Serbia) Luka Krivokapić
- 16 (Serbia) Andrej Trnavac
- 99 (Serbia) Vanja Radivojević

Left Wingers

- 7 (Serbia) Mladen Šotić
- 13 (Serbia) Vukašin Babić

Right Wingers

- 71 (Serbia) Milija Papović
- 77 (Serbia) Lazar Anđelković

Line Players

- 22 (Serbia) Ivan Mićić (c)
- 41 (Serbia) Petar Ivanić

Left Backs

- 19 (Belarus) Uladzislau Kulesh
- 20 (Serbia) Ilija Abutović
- 21 (Serbia) Simo Šijan

Central Backs

- 27 (Serbia) Uroš Gugolj
- 28 (Serbia) Filip Kočanović
- 93 (Serbia) Aljoša Damjanović

Right Backs

- 9 (Serbia) Brana Mirković

=== Technical staff ===
- Head coach: (Serbia) Marko Pavlović
- Goalkeeping coach: (Serbia) Mihailo Radosavljević
- Fitness coach: (Serbia) Marko Isaković
- Physiotherapist: (Serbia) Filip Cvetić

=== Transfers ===
Transfers during the 2026–27 season

Joining

- (Serbia) Luka Krivokapić (GK) from (Spain) Granollers

Leaving

- (Spain) Raúl González (HC)
- (Bosnia and Herzegovina) Bekir Čordalija (GK) to (Bosnia and Herzegovina) Gradačac
- (Spain) Miguel Sánchez-Migallón (LW)
- (Belarus) Uladzislau Kulesh (LB) ?
- (Serbia) Miloš Kos (LB) to (Germany) HSG Wetzlar
- (Israel) Yoav Lumbroso (CB) to (North Macedonia) Eurofarm Pelister ?
- (Russia) Sergey Ivanov (RB) to (Belarus) Meshkov Brest
- (Serbia) Nikola Crnoglavac (RB) to (Greece) AEK Athens
- (Austria) Tobias Wagner (LP)

=== Transfer History ===
Transfers for the 2026–27 season

Joining

- (Spain) Raúl González (HC) (free agent)
- (Bosnia and Herzegovina) Bekir Čordalija (GK) from (Poland) Iskra Kielce
- (Spain) Miguel Sánchez-Migallón (LW) from (Portugal) Benfica
- (Belarus) Uladzislau Kulesh (LB) from (Germany) Melsungen
- (Serbia) Ilija Abutović (LB) from (North Macedonia) Eurofarm Pelister
- (Serbia) Miloš Kos (LB) from (Germany) HC Erlangen
- (Serbia) Aleksa Vesković (LB) from (Serbia) Lavovi Beograd
- (Israel) Yoav Lumbroso (CB) from (Romania) Dinamo București
- (Serbia) Brana Mirković (RB) from (Serbia) Metaloplastika
- (Serbia) Milija Papović (RW) from (Serbia) Metaloplastika
- (Austria) Tobias Wagner (LP) from (France) Limoges

Leaving

- (Serbia) Đorđe Ćirković (HC) ?
- (Serbia) Nikola Zorić (GK) to (Serbia) Dinamo Pančevo
- (Serbia) Jovan Jevremović (GK) to (Serbia) Metaloplastika
- (Serbia) Marko Nikolić (LW) ?
- (Serbia) Aleksa Vesković (LB) on loan at (Serbia) Lavovi Beograd
- (Serbia) Nikola Zečević (LB) to (North Macedonia) Ohrid
- (Romania) Gabriel Ilie (LB) to (Romania) CSM Constanța
- (Romania) Liviu Caba (CB) to (Romania) CSM Constanța
- (Serbia) Veljko Popović (CB) to (Hungary) Balatonfüredi KSE
- (Slovenia) Miha Kotar (CB) to (North Macedonia) Eurofarm Pelister
- (Serbia) Radan Kovačević (CB) on loan at (Serbia) Šamot 65
- (Serbia) Uroš Stanković (RB) on loan at (Serbia) Lavovi Beograd
- (Serbia) Strahinja Stanković (RW) to (Serbia) Potisje Ada
- (Serbia) Vladimir Jevtić (LP) to (Serbia) Metaloplastika

Transfers for the 2025–26 season

Joining

- (Russia) Sergey Ivanov (RB) from (Russia) CSKA Moscow
- (Romania) Liviu Caba (CB) from (Romania) CSM București
- (Romania) Gabriel Ilie (LB) from (Romania) CSM Constanța
- (Serbia) Strahinja Stanković (RW) from (Romania) CSM Constanța
- (Serbia) Andrej Trnavac (GK) from (Serbia) Vojvodina
- (Serbia) Simo Šijan (CB) from (Serbia) Vojvodina
- (Serbia) Vladimir Jevtić (LP) from (Serbia) RK Vranje
- (Serbia) Petar Ivanić (LP) from (Serbia) Obilić
- (Serbia) Marko Nikolić (LW) from (Slovenia) Krka
- (Serbia) Jovan Jevremović (GK) from (Serbia) RK Dinamo Pančevo
- (Serbia) Aljoša Damjanović (CB) from (Serbia) RK Metaloplastika

Leaving

- (Iran) Saeid Heidarirad (GK) to (North Macedonia) Eurofarm Pelister
- (Montenegro) Miodrag Ćorsović (LP) to (France) Dijon Métropole
- (Montenegro) Luka Barjaktarović (LB) to (Serbia) RK Metaloplastika
- (Serbia) Petar Đorđić (LB) (retires)
- (Serbia) Mihajlo Radojković (RB) to (Israel) Ramat HaSharon
- (Serbia) (Hungary) Marko Vasić (RW) to (Serbia) RK Vranje
- (Serbia) Luka Arsenić (GK) to (Serbia) RK Jugović
- (North Macedonia) Bojan Madžovski (LW) to (Germany) Zwickauer HC Grubenlampe
- (Montenegro) Stevan Vujović (LB) to (United Arab Emirates) Al Nasr Club
- (Serbia) Nemanja Ratković (LP) to (Hungary) Csurgói KK
- (Serbia) Filip Milošević (CB) to (Serbia) RK Lavovi Beograd
- (Serbia) Đorđe Petrović (LW) on loan at (Serbia) RK Kikinda
- (Serbia) Radan Kovačević (LB) on loan at (Serbia) RK Kikinda
- (Serbia) Uroš Stanković (RB) on loan at (Serbia) RK Lavovi Beograd

== Notable players ==
The list includes players who played for their respective national teams in any major international tournaments, such as the Olympic Games, World Championships and European Championships:

- (Austria) Tobias Wagner
- (Belarus) Uladzislau Kulesh
- (Iran) Saeid Heidarirad
- (Montenegro) Aleksandar Glendža
- (Montenegro) Vuk Lazović
- (Montenegro) Rade Mijatović
- (Montenegro) Vladimir Osmajić
- (Montenegro) Radivoje Ristanović
- (Montenegro) Zoran Roganović
- (Montenegro) Stevan Vujović
- (North Macedonia) Bojan Madžovski
- (Spain) Miguel Sánchez-Migallón
- (Serbia) Ilija Abutović
- (Serbia) Nikola Crnoglavac
- (Serbia) Petar Đorđić
- (Serbia) Nemanja Ilić
- (Serbia) Vanja Ilić
- (Serbia) Miloš Kostadinović
- (Serbia) Lazar Kukić
- (Serbia) Dragan Marjanac
- (Serbia) Mijajlo Marsenić
- (Serbia) Savo Mešter
- (Serbia) Strahinja Milić
- (Serbia) Dejan Milosavljev
- (Serbia) Uroš Mitrović
- (Serbia) Živan Pešić
- (Serbia) Bogdan Radivojević
- (Serbia) Stevan Sretenović
- (Serbia) Ivan Stanković
- (Serbia) Darko Stevanović
- (Serbia) Rastko Stojković
- (Serbia) Aleksandar Stojanović
- (Serbia and Montenegro) Nikola Adžić
- (Serbia and Montenegro) (Serbia) Mladen Bojinović
- (Serbia and Montenegro) Zoran Đorđić
- (Serbia and Montenegro) (Montenegro) Ratko Đurković
- (Serbia and Montenegro) (Hungary) Nikola Eklemović
- (Serbia and Montenegro) Nedeljko Jovanović
- (Serbia and Montenegro) (Montenegro) Petar Kapisoda
- (Serbia and Montenegro) Aleksandar Knežević
- (Serbia and Montenegro) Branko Kokir
- (Serbia and Montenegro) Jovan Kovačević
- (Serbia and Montenegro) Blažo Lisičić
- (Serbia and Montenegro) Nenad Maksić
- (Serbia and Montenegro) Vladimir Mandić
- (Serbia and Montenegro) Vladan Matić
- (Serbia and Montenegro) Dragan Momić
- (Serbia and Montenegro) Predrag Peruničić
- (Serbia and Montenegro) (Hungary) Nenad Puljezević
- (Serbia and Montenegro) Dane Šijan
- (Serbia and Montenegro) Vladica Stojanović
- (Serbia and Montenegro) Goran Stupar
- (Serbia and Montenegro) Dragan Sudžum
- (Serbia and Montenegro) (Serbia) Alem Toskić
- (Socialist Federal Republic of Yugoslavia) Abas Arslanagić
- (Socialist Federal Republic of Yugoslavia) Časlav Grubić
- (Socialist Federal Republic of Yugoslavia) Milan Kalina
- (Socialist Federal Republic of Yugoslavia) Radivoje Krivokapić
- (Socialist Federal Republic of Yugoslavia) Dobrivoje Selec
- (Socialist Federal Republic of Yugoslavia) (Serbia and Montenegro) Goran Stojanović

== Head coaches ==
- (Socialist Federal Republic of Yugoslavia) Marijan Flander
- (Socialist Federal Republic of Yugoslavia) Radosav Mutić
- (Socialist Federal Republic of Yugoslavia) Srđan Praljak
- (Socialist Federal Republic of Yugoslavia) Petar Eror
- (Socialist Federal Republic of Yugoslavia) Vilim Tičić
- (Socialist Federal Republic of Yugoslavia) Petar Lazarević
- (Socialist Federal Republic of Yugoslavia) Zoran Pantazis
- (Socialist Federal Republic of Yugoslavia) Dragan Stevanović
- (Socialist Federal Republic of Yugoslavia) Kosta Veselinović
- (Socialist Federal Republic of Yugoslavia) Vitomir Arsenijević
- (Socialist Federal Republic of Yugoslavia) Vlatko Martinčević
- (Socialist Federal Republic of Yugoslavia) Vladimir Cindrić
- (Socialist Federal Republic of Yugoslavia) Vojislav Malešević
- (Socialist Federal Republic of Yugoslavia) Branislav Petković
- (Socialist Federal Republic of Yugoslavia) Momčilo Jovanović
- (Socialist Federal Republic of Yugoslavia) Đorđe Vučinić
- (Socialist Federal Republic of Yugoslavia) Miodrag Savić
- (Socialist Federal Republic of Yugoslavia) Milan Tomaš
- (Socialist Federal Republic of Yugoslavia) Radomir Diklić
- (Socialist Federal Republic of Yugoslavia) Vasilije Đokić
- (Socialist Federal Republic of Yugoslavia) Mihajlo Obradović (1990–1991)
- (Socialist Federal Republic of Yugoslavia) Kasim Kamenica (1991–1992)
- (Serbia and Montenegro) Jovica Elezović (1992–1995)
- (Serbia and Montenegro) Mile Isaković (1995)
- (Serbia and Montenegro) Jovica Elezović (1995–1996)
- (Serbia and Montenegro) Nikola Adžić (1996–1997)
- (Serbia and Montenegro) Ljubomir Obradović (1997–1998)
- (Serbia and Montenegro) Jovica Elezović (1998–1999)
- (Serbia and Montenegro) Dušan Medić (1999)
- (Serbia and Montenegro) Jezdimir Stanković (1999)
- (Serbia and Montenegro) Zlatan Arnautović (1999)
- (Serbia and Montenegro) Veselin Vujović (1999–2000)
- (Serbia and Montenegro) Branko Štrbac (2000–2001)
- (Serbia and Montenegro) Mile Malešević (2001)
- (Serbia and Montenegro) Vuk Roganović (2001)
- (Serbia and Montenegro) Zoran Kurteš (2001–2003)
- (Serbia and Montenegro) Marko Isaković (2003)
- (Serbia and Montenegro) Branko Štrbac (2004)
- (Serbia and Montenegro) Zoran Kurteš (2004)
- (Serbia and Montenegro) Časlav Dinčić (2004–2005)
- (Serbia and Montenegro) Branislav Pokrajac (2006)
- (Serbia and Montenegro) Marko Isaković (2006)
- (Serbia) Nikola Jevremović (2006–2007)
- (Serbia) Zoran Ivić (2007)
- (Serbia) Saša Bošković (2008–2010)
- (Serbia) Aleksandar Brković (2010–2014)
- (Serbia) Nenad Maksić (2014–2018)
- (Serbia) Bojan Butulija (2018–2019)
- (Serbia) Željko Radojević (2019)
- (Serbia) Nenad Maksić (2020–2022)
- (Serbia) Dario Krželj (2023)
- (Serbia) Đorđe Ćirković (2023–2026)
- (Spain) Raúl González (2026–Present)
