= RK Jugović =

Serbian handball club

- Full name: Rukometni Klub Jugović
- Nickname: Kaćki tići (The Kać's Fledglings)
- Founded: 1956; 70 years ago
- Arena: Hram Sport Hall, Kać
- Capacity: 2,000
- Head coach: Predrag Topić
- League: Arkus Liga
- Club colours
Home	Away

RK Jugović (Serbian Cyrillic: РК Југовић) is a Serbian handball club based in Kać, Novi Sad. They compete in the top tier Serbian handball league, the Arkus league.

Location of RK Jugović

== History ==
Founded as RK Mladost in 1956, the club changed its name to RK Jugović in 1960. They made their Yugoslav Handball Championship debut in 1984. The club achieved its greatest success by winning the EHF Challenge Cup in the 2000–01 season. After spending more than 30 consecutive seasons in the top flight, they suffered relegation from the Serbian Handball Super League in 2018.

== Team ==
=== Current squad ===
Squad for the 2022–23 season

RK Jugović

Goalkeepers

- 1 (Serbia) Nikola Skuban
- 12 (Serbia) (Montenegro) Milan Kosanović
- 96 (Serbia) Vladimir Abadžić
- 97 (Serbia) Zoran Andrić

Left Wingers

- 3 (Serbia) Zoran Kukić
- 43 (Serbia) Rajko Simić
- 77 (Serbia) Milan Bošković
- 99 (Serbia) Đorđe Petljanski

Right Wingers

- 18 (Serbia) Ognjen Regodić
- 20 (Serbia) Nikola Bilić
- 33 (Serbia) Saša Terzić

Line Players

- 9 (Serbia) Nikola Vidojević
- 22 (Serbia) Radivoj Ninkov
- 88 (Serbia) Petar Petrović

Central Backs

- 17 (Serbia) Ivan Radojčić
- 23 (Serbia) Mladen Đukić
- 24 (Serbia) Marko Knežević

Left Backs

- 4 (Serbia) Nikola Kovačević
- 7 (Serbia) Zdravko Dragoljević
- 10 (Serbia) Strahinja Travar
- 19 (Serbia) Ivan Bursać
- 44 (Serbia) Marko Dražić

Right Backs

- 6 (Serbia) Nemanja Momčilović

=== Technical staff ===
- Head Coach: (Serbia) Predrag Topić
- Physiotherapist: (Serbia) Radovan Kovačev

=== Transfers ===
Transfers for the 2026–27 season

Joining

- (Serbia) (Hungary) Marko Vasić (RW) from (Serbia) RK Vranje
- (Serbia) Miljan Vukovljak (LB) from (Serbia) RK Vojvodina

Leaving

=== Transfer History ===
Transfers for the 2025–26 season

Joining

- (Serbia) Luka Arsenić (GK) from (Serbia) RK Partizan
- (Serbia) Marko Drasko (GK) from (Serbia) RK Vojvodina
- (Serbia) Aleksa Skuban (LW) from (Serbia) RK Crvena zvezda

Leaving

- (Serbia) Kosta Dizdar (GK) to (Serbia) RK Vojvodina
- (Serbia) Nikola Vidojević (LP) to (Serbia) RK Crvena zvezda
- (Serbia) Lazar Barbatesković (RW) to (Serbia) RK Dubočica 54

Transfers for the 2022–23 season

Joining

- (Serbia) (Montenegro) Milan Kosanović (GK)
- (Serbia) Nikola Kovačević (LB) from (Serbia) RK Vojvodina
- (Serbia) Strahinja Travar (LB) from (Serbia) RK Mokra Gora
- (Serbia) Milan Bošković (LW) from (Serbia) RK Dinamo Pančevo
- (Serbia) Saša Terzić (RW) from (Serbia) RK Metaloplastika
- (Serbia) Marko Knežević (CB) from (Serbia) RK Crvena zvezda

Leaving

- (Serbia) Borislav Milovanović (GK) to (Serbia) RK Rudar Kostolac
- (Serbia) Zlatko Rakić (CB) to (Serbia) RK Kikinda Grindex
- (Serbia) Danijel Radisavljević (RW) to (Serbia) RK Dubočica 54

== Previous squads ==
2000–2001 Team
Shirt No	Nationality	Player	Birth Date	Position
1	Serbia	Svetislav Verkić	11 June 1981 (age 45)	Goalkeeper
3	Montenegro	Dragan Gvozdenović	17 July 1970 (age 56)	Line Player
5	Serbia	Nikola Marković	1 July 1971 (age 55)	Line Player
6	Montenegro	Momčilo Božović	11 April 1979 (age 47)	Left Back
7	Serbia	Goran Arsenić	17 May 1966 (age 60)	Right Winger
9	Serbia	Nebojša Jokić	29 July 1968 (age 58)	Left Winger
10	Serbia	Nenad Savić	28 June 1981 (age 45)	Line Player
11	Serbia	Dusan Todorović	3 February 1980 (age 46)	Central Back
12	SerbiaSpain	Árpád Sterbik	20 November 1979 (age 46)	Goalkeeper
13	SerbiaHungary	Milorad Krivokapić	30 July 1980 (age 46)	Right Back
14	Serbia	Tihomir Doder	8 August 1979 (age 47)	Central Back
15	Serbia	Milan Mirković	16 August 1974 (age 52)	Left Back
17	Montenegro	Milorad Despotović	14 May 1973 (age 53)	Left Back
18	Serbia	Aleksa Radukin	30 March 1977 (age 49)	Right Back
19	Serbia	Božo Rudić	14 September 1971 (age 55)	Right Back
31	Serbia	Božidar Nadoveza	16 May 1981 (age 45)	Left Back

== Accomplishments ==
- EHF Challenge Cup
  - Gold: 2001
- Serbian Cup
  - Silver: 2007

== European record ==
=== EHF Challenge Cup ===
Season	Round	Club	Home	Away	Aggregate
2000–01; Winners	Round 4	(Luxembourg) HB Dudelange	27–15	34–21	61–36
2000–01; Winners	Quarter-finals	(France) US Ivry Handball	33–25	16–23	49–48
2000–01; Winners	Semi-finals	(Italy) SSV Brixen Handball	27–19	23–27	50–46
2000–01; Winners	Finals	(Switzerland) Pfadi Winterthur	26–22	27–27	53–49

== Former club members ==
=== Notable former players ===
- (Serbia) Nikola Crnoglavac (2010–2015)
- (Serbia) Tihomir Doder (1997–2003, 2020–2021)
- (Serbia) (North Macedonia) Šandor Hodik (1989–1993, 2002–2004)
- (Serbia) (Montenegro) Branko Kankaraš (2006–2013)
- (Serbia) (Montenegro) Milan Kosanović (2022–)
- (Serbia) Marko Krsmančić (2007–2010)
- (Serbia) Marko Krivokapić (1992–1998)
- (Serbia) (Hungary) Milorad Krivokapić (1996–2002)
- (Serbia) Dobrivoje Marković (2001–2008, 2020)
- (Serbia) Dejan Milosavljev (2011–2016)
- (Serbia) Nenad Peruničić (1990–1993, 2007–2008, 2015)
- (Serbia) Rajko Prodanović (2002–2008)
- (Serbia) (Spain) Árpád Sterbik (1996–2001)
- (Serbia) Dragan Sudžum (2012–2013)
- (Serbia) Milan Torbica (2001–2002)
- (Serbia) Svetislav Verkić (1998–2003)
- (Montenegro) (Qatar) Žarko Marković (2003–2006)
- (Montenegro) Mirko Milašević (2003–2004, 2020–2021)

=== Former coaches ===
Seasons	Coach	Country
2019-2020	Boris Žarković	(Serbia)
2020	Goran Kurteš	(Serbia)
2020–2022	Božo Rudić	(Serbia)
2022–	Predrag Topić	(Serbia)
