= Serbian Handball Cup =

- Sport: Handball
- Founded: 2006; 20 years ago
- No. of teams: 12
- Country: Serbia; 2006–present
- Most recent champion: Partizan (6th title) (2025–26)
- Most titles: Vojvodina (7 titles)
- Website: rss.org.rs

Serbian Handball Cup is the nationwide cup tournament for men's handball teams in Serbia.

== Winners ==
Year	Winner	Runner-up
2007	Partizan	Jugović
2008	Partizan	Kolubara
2009	Kolubara	Partizan
2010	Kolubara	Crvena zvezda
2011	Vojvodina	Crvena zvezda
2012	Partizan	Spartak Subotica
2013	Partizan	Zaječar
2014	Železničar 1949	Crvena zvezda
2015	Vojvodina	Spartak Subotica
2016	Metaloplastika	Vojvodina
2017	Crvena zvezda	Spartak Subotica
2018	Železničar 1949	Vojvodina
2019	Vojvodina	Dinamo Pančevo
2020	Vojvodina	Dinamo Pančevo
2021	Vojvodina	Metaloplastika
2022	Metaloplastika	Vojvodina
2023	Vojvodina	Dinamo Pančevo
2024	Partizan	Vojvodina
2025	Vojvodina	Partizan
2026	Partizan	Dinamo Pančevo

== Titles by club ==
Team	Cups	Years won
Vojvodina	7	2011, 2015, 2019, 2020, 2021, 2023, 2025
Partizan	6	2007, 2008, 2012, 2013, 2024, 2026
Železničar-Jug	2	2014, 2018
Kolubara	2	2009, 2010
Metaloplastika	2	2016, 2022
Crvena zvezda	1	2017

== All-time Cup winners (Yugoslavia, Serbia&Montenegro, present day Serbia) ==
Total number of national cups won by Serbian clubs. Table includes titles won during the Yugoslav Handball Cup (1955–1992) and Serbia and Montenegro Handball Cup (1992–2006) as well.

Club	Titles	Years won
Partizan	13	1959, 1966, 1971, 1993, 1994, 1998, 2001, 2007, 2008, 2012, 2013, 2024, 2026
Vojvodina	9	2005, 2006, 2011, 2015, 2019, 2020, 2021, 2023, 2025
Železničar-Jug	7	1977, 1982, 1985, 1997, 1999, 2014, 2018
Metaloplastika	6	1980, 1983, 1984, 1986, 2016, 2022
Crvena zvezda	5	1956, 1995, 1996, 2004, 2017
Crvenka	2	1967, 1988
Kolubara	2	2009, 2010
Sintelon	1	2000
