= ARKUS liga =

Premier handball competition in Serbia

- Sport: Handball
- Founded: 2006; 20 years ago
- No. of teams: 12
- Country: Serbia
- Confederation: EHF
- Most recent champion: Partizan (11th title) (2025–26)
- Most titles: Vojvodina (12 titles)
- Relegation to: Super B League
- International cups: EHF Champions League; EHF European League; EHF European Cup
- Website: arkus-liga.rs

The Serbian Handball ARKUS liga (Serbian: АРКУС лига / ARKUS liga) is the top men's handball league in Serbia. It was founded in 2006 to replace the Serbia and Montenegro Handball Super League.

== Rules ==
=== Competition format ===
The league is operated by the Handball Federation of Serbia. It is composed of 12 teams. In the main round each team plays each other twice, home and away. The four best placed teams meet in a play-off.

The play-off consists of Best-of-three match-ups in semifinals and finals. The third-place match is a single match.

The last 8 teams meet in a relegation round. Points is transferred from the main round, and each team meet each other once. The two last placed teams are relegated to the second tier and the third last place meet in a relegation/promotion playoff with the third placed team in the Second League.

== Current teams ==
=== Teams for season 2026–27 ===
Location of teams in 2026–27 ARKUS liga

Team	City
Vojvodina	Novi Sad
Metaloplastika	Šabac
Partizan	Belgrade
Dinamo	Pančevo
Crvena zvezda	Belgrade
Dubočica 54	Leskovac
Radnički	Kragujevac
Loznica	Loznica
Jugović	Novi Sad
Šamot 65	Aranđelovac
Lavovi	Belgrade
Železničar-Jug	Niš

Clubs in the 2026–27 Regional Handball League

== List of champions ==
Handball League of Serbia
season	Champion	second	third
2006–07	Crvena zvezda	Partizan	Proleter Zrenjanin
2007–08	Crvena zvezda	Kolubara	Proleter Zrenjanin
2008–09	Partizan	Kolubara	Crvena zvezda
2009–10	Kolubara	Crvena zvezda	Metaloplastika
2010–11	Partizan	Crvena zvezda	Kolubara
2011–12	Partizan	Vojvodina	Radnički Kragujevac
2012–13	Vojvodina	Partizan	Vrbas
2013–14	Vojvodina	Radnički Kragujevac	Metaloplastika
2014–15	Vojvodina	Spartak Subotica	Metaloplastika
2015–16	Vojvodina	Metaloplastika	Partizan
2016–17	Vojvodina	Dinamo Pančevo	Crvena zvezda
2017–18	Vojvodina	Železničar Niš	Partizan
2018–19	Vojvodina	Metaloplastika	Železničar Niš
2019–20	Canceled due to the COVID-19 pandemic - no champion announced		
2020–21	Vojvodina	Partizan	Metaloplastika
2021–22	Vojvodina	Partizan	Radnički Kragujevac
2022–23	Vojvodina	Partizan	Metaloplastika
2023–24	Vojvodina	Metaloplastika	Partizan
2024–25	Partizan	Vojvodina	Metaloplastika
2025–26	Partizan	Vojvodina	Dinamo Pančevo

== Performances ==
=== In Serbia ===
Club	Titles	Seasons
Vojvodina	11	2013, 2014, 2015, 2016, 2017, 2018, 2019, 2021, 2022, 2023, 2024
Partizan	5	2009, 2011, 2012, 2025, 2026
Crvena zvezda	2	2007, 2008
Kolubara	1	2010

=== All-time ===
- Including titles in Yugoslavia, Serbia and Montenegro

Team	Championships	Years won
Vojvodina	12	2005, 2013, 2014, 2015, 2016, 2017, 2018, 2019, 2021, 2022, 2023, 2024
Partizan	11	1993, 1994, 1995, 1999, 2002, 2003, 2009, 2011, 2012, 2025, 2026
Crvena zvezda	9	1955, 1956, 1996, 1997, 1998, 2004, 2006, 2007, 2008
Metaloplastika	7	1982, 1983, 1984, 1985, 1986, 1987, 1988
Proleter Zrenjanin	2	1990, 1992
Crvenka	1	1969
Kolubara	1	2010

== Serbian handball clubs in European competitions ==
EHF Champions League

Club	Winner	Years
Metaloplastika	2	1985, 1986

EHF European Cup

Club	Winner	Years
Jugović	1	2001
Vojvodina	1	2023

== Sponsorships and broadcasting rights ==
- Merkur osiguranje
- Select
- EPS
- RTS

== See also ==
- Serbian First League of Handball for Women
- Handball Federation of Serbia
