= Petar Nenadić =

Serbian handball player (born 1986)

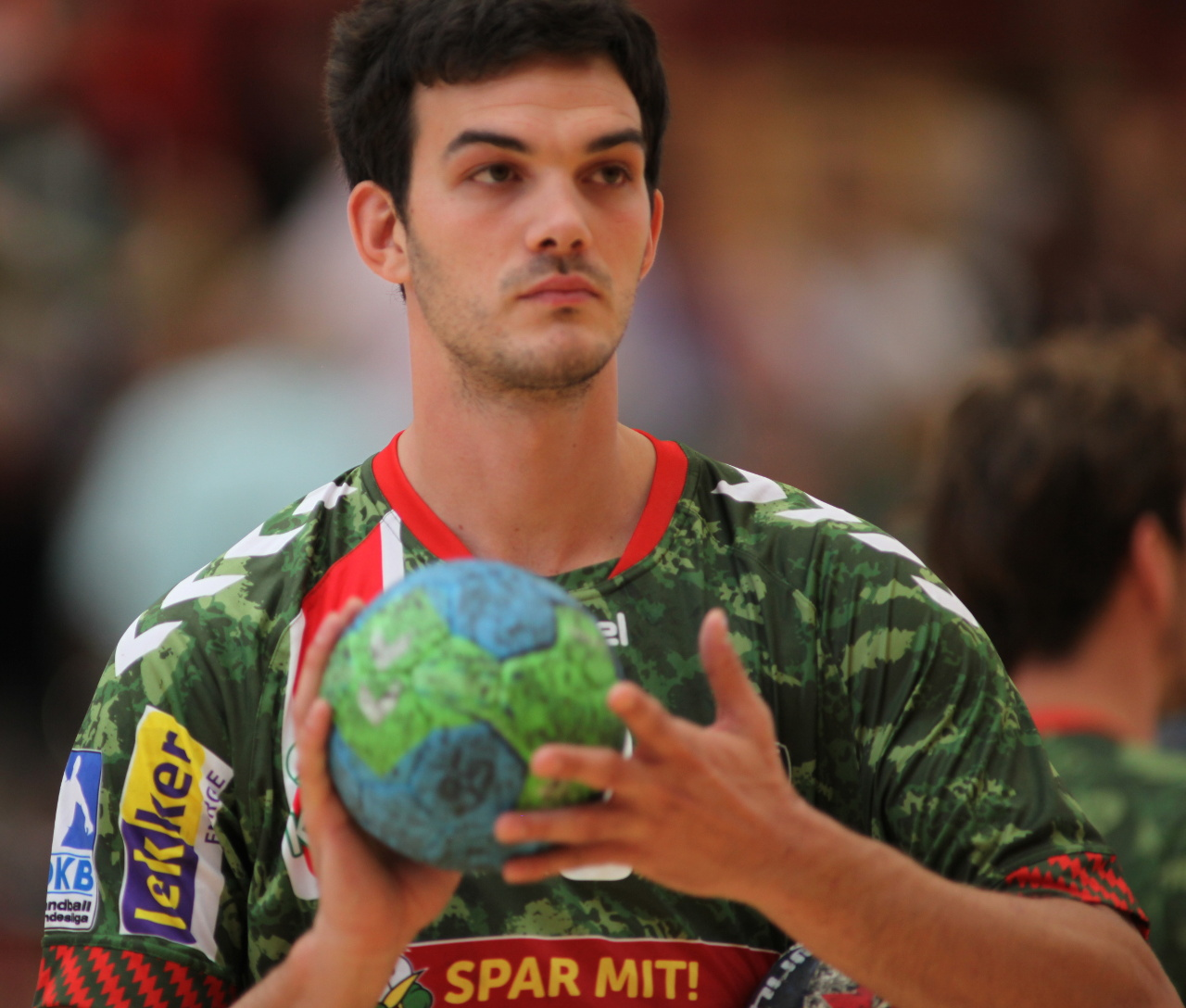

Personal information
- Nationality: Serbian
- Born: 28 June 1986 (age 40) Belgrade, SFR Yugoslavia
- Height: 1.98 m (6 ft 6 in)

Sport
- Sport: Handball
- Position: Center back

Senior clubs
- Years: Team
- –2007: RK Crvena zvezda
- 2007: Algeciras BM
- 2007–2008: FC Barcelona
- 2008–2010: SC Pick Szeged
- 2010–2012: TTH Holstebro
- 2012–2014: Wisła Płock
- 2014–2017: Füchse Berlin
- 2018–2023: Telekom Veszprém
- 2023: Paris Saint-Germain
- 2023: Khaleej Club
National team
Years	Team	Apps	(Gls)
2007–2024	Serbia	78	(213)
Medal record
European Championship
Silver medal – second place	2012 Serbia
Mediterranean Games
Gold medal – first place	2009 Pescara	Team

Petar Nenadić (born 28 June 1986) is a Serbian former handball player.

His brother Draško also played for the national team.

== Club career ==
=== RK Crvena zvezda ===
Born in Belgrade, Serbia, Nenadić began playing handball in local team RK Crvena Zvezda's youth setup. He moved up to the senior team in 2003, aged only 17.

Nenadić given a chance in the first-team of RK Crvena Zvezda as a 17-years-old, next to stars like Darko Stanić, Ivan Nikčević, Rastko Stojković and Nikola Manojlović. As a rotation player, Nenadić was part of the team won Yugoslav championship and the Yugoslav cup. In the following season, 2004–05, Nenadić made his breakthrough and finished the season as the top scorer of RK Crvena Zvezda with 113 goals, but the team only managed to achieve the 6th place in the league.

2005–06 season began with five consecutive losses, and RK Crvena Zvezda were far away from the top part of the table, but since the 27:27 draw against Partizan Belgrade, when Nenadić scored 9 goals, the team were unstoppable. Nenadić finished the season as the top scorer with 272 goals, and led RK Crvena Zvezda to its last championship in the era of Serbia and Montenegro.

Nenadić suffered a serious knee injury in the pre-season trainings before 2006–07 season and missed most of the season, what weakened his team. However, he returned for the last 5 games of the season, and scored 39 goals which helped RK Crvena Zvezda win its second consecutive championship.

=== Spain ===
On 6 July 2007, Nenadić signed on a three-year deal with Liga ASOBAL side Algeciras BM, and joined his first team outside Serbia. He scored 65 goals in the first half of 2007/08 season and because of economic difficulties Algeciras faced then, he was loaned to Liga ASOBAL powerhouse FC Barcelona for the remainder of the season, with an option to purchase him at the end of the season.

In Barcelona, Nenadić scored 31 goals in EHF Champions League, but his team were eliminated in the semi-final by THW Kiel. Manolo Cadenas' team haven't managed to win any title, also in the Spanish zone, being defeated by Ciudad Real who later won the local championship.

=== Pick Szeged ===
Although he got some offers from Spanish and German teams, and Barcelona haven't activated their purchase option, Nenadić decided to join Hungarian cup winners SC Pick Szeged. On 6 May 2008, Nenadić signed his three-year contract in Pick Szeged. In Szeged he joined four other Serbs: Milorad Krivokapic, Nenad Puljezevic, Dragan Marjanac and Danijel Andelkovic.

On his first season in Szeged, 2008–09, Nenadić and his team have not managed to win any title. They've finished in the 2nd place in the Hungarian league. In Europe, Szeged were eliminated from EHF Champions League but they reached the 1/4 final of EHF Cup Winners' Cup, where they faced HSG Nordhorn. In the first leg, Nenadić scored 4 goals and added one goal in the second leg, but it wasn't enough and Szeged were eliminated by the Germans. Additionally, Szeged lost to MVM Veszprém in the final of Magyar Kupa. Right after the loss, Nenadić's contract was terminated due to a conflict with club owner.

During the summer before 2009–10 season, Nenadić, who was a free agent, went to trials with some clubs, notably in Rhein-Neckar Löwen, but he failed to find a new club. Due to Danijel Andelkovic's injury, and as Nenadić had no club, Szeged have decided to re-sign Nenadić for the remainder of the season and to bring him back to team squad. Nenadić scored 37 goals in EHF Champions League, but Szeged were eliminated in the group phase. In the domestic competitions, Szeged finished as a runner-up again, in the Hungarian league and in the Hungarian cup.

=== Team Tvis Holstebro ===
At the end of 2009–10 season, Pick Szeged have faced financial problems and had to terminate Nenadić's contract. He signed a one-year contract with Danish side Team Tvis Holstebro. Nenadić finished the season as the team top goalscorer with 118 goals in 18 games, and at the end of the season his contract was extended for two more years, with an exit option between the years. In his second season in Denmark, Nenadić helped his team reach the bronze medal of Jack&Jones Ligaen. Nenadić finished the season as the 3rd top goalscorer of Danish League, with 170 goals in 32 games. At the end of the season, TTH Holstebro used an option to terminate the contract although he had one more left in the contract.

=== Wisła Płock ===
On 12 May 2012, Nenadić joined Polish runner-up Wisła Płock on a one-year deal. He scored 12 goals in the EHF Cup campaign, that ended for Wisła Płock in the group phase. Nenadić suffered some injuries on his first season in Płock and had to miss part of the season. His team lost to Vive Targi Kielce in the championship play-off and finished the season again as runner-ups. In the following season, Nenadić had greater role in the team squad. He scored 67 goals in the EHF Champions League and led Wisła Płock to the Last 16, where they were defeated by MVM Vezsprém. In Poland, they were beaten again by Kielce in the championship play-off. Nenadić finished the season as the top goalscorer.

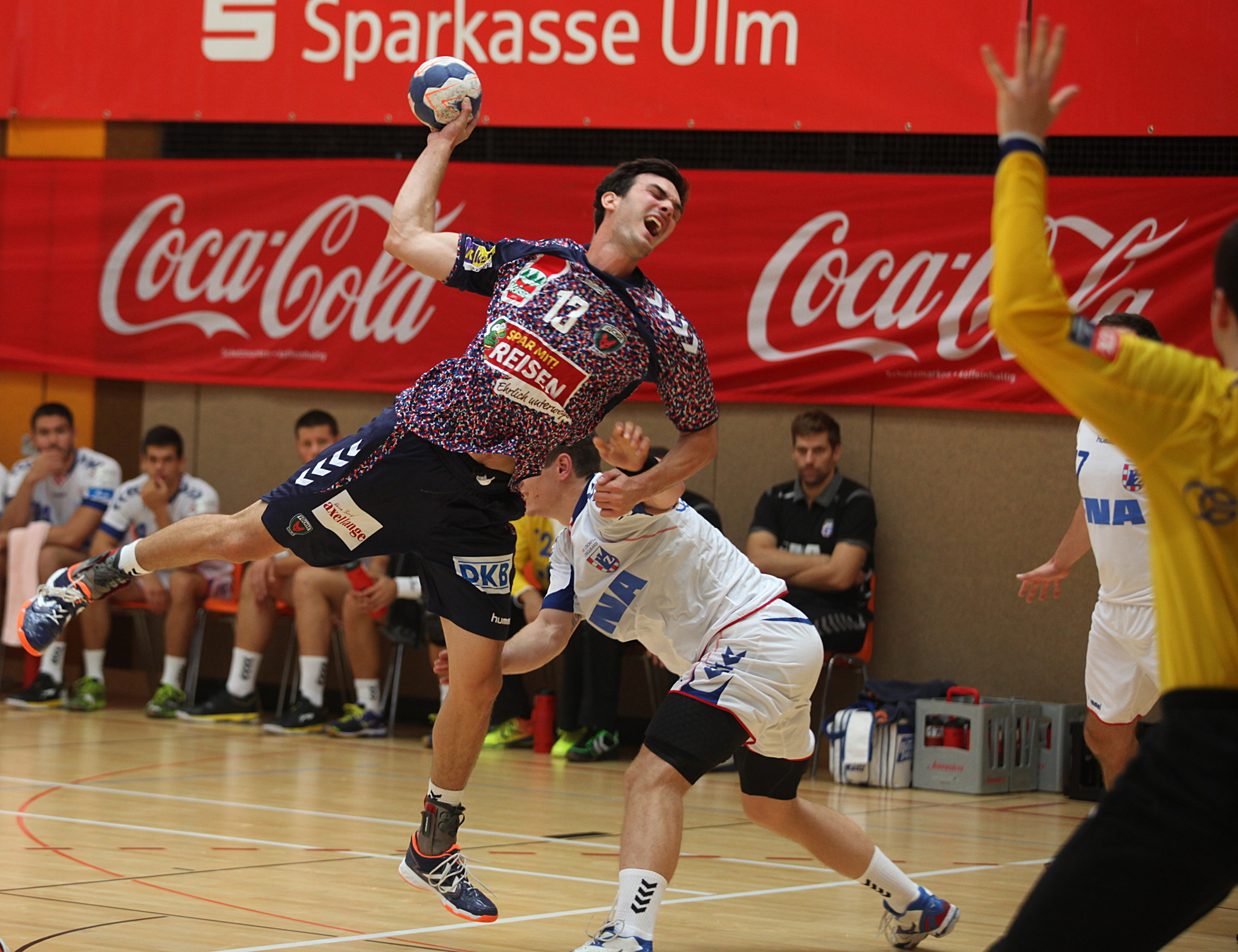
Nenadić in Füchse Berlin

=== Füchse Berlin ===
On 17 July 2014, Nenadić signed on a one-year deal with German powerhouse Füchse Berlin, as a replacement for Bartlomiej Jaszka who retired right before the beginning of the pre-season, due to a serious shoulder injury. Nenadić finished the season as the Foxes' top goalscorer, with 169 goals (29 penalties) in the Bundesliga, leading Füchse Berlin to the 7th place in the Bundesliga. He finished as the 11th top goalscorer of the Bundesliga. Nenadić also scored 9 goals in the DHB-Pokal semi final against SC Magdeburg, but Füchse lost by one-goal margin, 27:26. He added 32 goals in the EHF Cup, including six goals in the final game against HSV Hamburg, as Füchse Berlin achieved its first European title ever. At the end of the season, Nenadić signed on a two-year contract extension with Füchse Berlin.

Nenadić continued his good form from his first season in Germany in the following season. Although he scored 6 goals in the first leg and 12 goals in the second leg, Füchse were eliminated in the third qualifying round of the EHF Cup by Chambéry Savoie. Nenadić led Füchse to the 5th place in the Bundesliga. He finished the season as the top goalscorer of the Bundesliga, with 229 goals. He averaged 7.2 goals per game. Nenadić signed another two-year contract with Füchse before the end of the season.

=== Veszprém ===
On 1 January 2018, Nenadić joined Veszprém KC on a two and a half years contract, for a reported fee of €500,000. On 24 February 2023 the club announced that Nenadić "was suspended because of disciplinary offences" and "the club terminated the player's contract by mutual agreement with immediate effect".

=== PSG ===
On 1 March 2023 he was announced by Paris Saint-Germain on a contract for the rest of the season.

== Individual awards ==
- EHF Player of the year: 2019
- Serbian Handball Player of the Year: 2016, 2017, 2020
- MVP of the SEHA League Final Four: 2021
- SEHA League All-Star Team Best Centre Back: 2020–21
- EHF Champions League All-Star Team Best Left Back: 2022
