= Predrag Peruničić =

Serbian handball player (born 1967)

Personal information
- Full name: Predrag Peruničić
- Nationality: Serbian
- Born: 27 June 1967 (age 59) Pljevlja, SR Montenegro, SFR Yugoslavia

Sport
- Sport: Handball
- Position: Centre back

Youth career
- Years: Team
- –: Rudar Pljevlja

Senior clubs
- Years: Team
- –: Dinamo Pančevo
- –: Crvenka
- 1991–1993: Partizan
- 1993–1994: VfL Fredenbeck
- 1995–1997: Crvena zvezda
- 1997–1998: Partizan
- 1998–1999: Lovćen
- 1999–2003: Partizan
- 2003–2004: Železničar Niš
- 2004–2005: Vojvodina
- 2005–2006: Partizan
National team
- Years: Team
- 1995–1997: FR Yugoslavia
Medal record
Men's handball
Representing FR Yugoslavia
European Championship
Bronze medal – third place	1996 Spain	Team

Predrag Peruničić (Serbian Cyrillic: Предраг Перуничић; born 27 June 1967) is a Serbian former handball player.

== Club career ==
Over the course of his career that spanned 20 years, Peruničić played for Partizan on four separate occasions, winning three national championships (1992–93, 2001–02, and 2002–03) and three national cups (1992–93, 1997–98, and 2000–01). He also won a domestic double with Crvena zvezda (1995–96) and Vojvodina (2004–05).

== International career ==
At international level, Peruničić represented FR Yugoslavia in two major tournaments, winning the bronze medal at the 1996 European Championship.

== Personal life ==
Peruničić is the older brother of fellow handball player Nenad Peruničić.

== Honours ==
Partizan

- Handball Championship of FR Yugoslavia: 1992–93, 2001–02, 2002–03
- Handball Cup of FR Yugoslavia: 1992–93, 1997–98, 2000–01

Crvena zvezda

- Handball Championship of FR Yugoslavia: 1995–96, 1996–97
- Handball Cup of FR Yugoslavia: 1995–96

Vojvodina

- Serbia and Montenegro Handball Super League: 2004–05
- Serbia and Montenegro Handball Cup: 2004–05
