= Liga ASOBAL 2005–06 =

Liga ASOBAL 2005–06 season was the 16th since its establishment. A total of 16 teams competed this season for the championship.

== Competition format ==
The competition was played in a round-robin format, through 30 rounds. The team with most points earned wins the championship. The last two teams were relegated.

== Overall standing ==
	Team	P	W	D	L	G+	G−	Dif	Pts
1	Barcelona-Cifec	30	28	0	2	919	747	172	56
2	Ciudad Real	30	27	0	3	955	794	161	54
3	Portland San Antonio	30	25	2	3	903	721	182	52
4	Valladolid	30	19	2	9	922	845	77	40
5	Caja España Ademar	30	18	2	10	925	840	85	38
6	Bidasoa Irún	30	13	3	14	861	876	–15	29
7	CAI Aragón	30	13	1	15	877	886	–9	28
8	Torrevieja	30	11	5	14	821	847	–26	27
9	Algeciras	30	12	3	15	808	839	–31	27
10	Fraikin Granollers	30	10	5	15	828	854	–26	25
11	Keymare Almería	30	10	3	17	829	869	–40	23
12	Arrate	30	7	8	15	791	855	–64	22
13	Teka Cantabria	30	10	1	19	831	934	–103	21
14	Altea	30	8	2	20	792	876	–84	18
15	Alcobendas	30	4	4	22	763	876	–113	12
16	Frigoríficos Morrazo	30	4	0	26	737	903	–166	8

EHF Champions League
EHF Cup Winners' Cup
EHF Cup
relegated

2005–06 Liga ASOBAL winners
(Catalonia)
Barcelona
Ninth title

=== Conclusions ===
- FC Barcelona-Cifec -- EHF Champions League and Liga ASOBAL Champion
- BM Ciudad Real -- EHF Champions League
- Portland San Antonio -- EHF Champions League
- BM Valladolid -- EHF Champions League
- Caja España Ademar León -- EHF Cup Winner's Cup
- CD Bidasoa -- EHF Cup
- CAI BM Aragón -- EHF Cup
- BM Alcobendas—Relegated to División de Honor B
- CB Cangas—Relegated to División de Honor B

== Top goal scorers ==
Player	Goals	Team
(Argentina) Eric Gull	220	Valladolid
(Serbia) Žikica Milosavljević	209	Teka Cantabria
(Egypt) Hussein Zaky	195	Ciudad Real
(Norway) Kristian Kjelling	184	Caja España Ademar
(Montenegro) Alen Muratović	184	Valladolid
(Serbia) Ivan Nikčević	177	Altea
(Serbia) Davor Čutura	168	Arrate
(Serbia) Vladimir Petrić	161	Keymare Almería
(Spain) Iker Romero	161	Barcelona Cifec
(Serbia) Ivan Stanković	158	Bidasoa Irún
(Spain) Cristian Malmagro	153	Fraikin Granollers

== Top goalkeepers ==
Player	Catches	Shots	Team
(Spain) José Manuel Sierra	358	1111	Valladolid
(Spain) Armand Torrego	345	953	Algeciras
(Bosnia and Herzegovina) Danijel Šarić	331	1068	Alcobendas
(Norway) Ole Erevik	318	997	Bidasoa Irún
(Spain) Vicente Álamo	295	937	Fraikin Granollers
(Spain) Diego Moyano	291	908	Torrevieja
(Spain) Iñaki Malumbres	274	870	Arrate
(Denmark) Kristian Asmussen	268	912	Altea
(Serbia) Dimitrije Pejanović	258	824	Keymare Almería
(Spain) Jorge Martínez	252	772	Caja España Ademar
(Denmark) Kasper Hvidt	245	634	Portland San Antonio
