= Ratko Nikolić =

Serbian politician and former handball player (born 1977)

- Ратко Николић

Member of the National Assembly
- Incumbent
- Assumed office 8 December 2021

Personal details
- Born: 15 September 1977 (age 49) Aranđelovac, SR Serbia, SFR Yugoslavia
- Party: SPS
- Handball career
- Nationality: Serbian
- Height: 1.90 m (6 ft 3 in)
- Sport: Handball
- Position: Pivot

Youth career
- Years: Team
- –: Šamot

Senior clubs
- Years: Team
- 1996–1999: Crvena zvezda
- 1999–2003: Sintelon
- 2003–2004: Fotex Veszprém
- 2004–2005: Altea
- 2005–2010: Portland San Antonio
- 2010: Al Sadd
- 2010–2011: KIF Kolding
- 2011–2012: Vardar
- 2012–2013: Dinamo Minsk
- 2013–2016: Borac Banja Luka
- 2016: Šamot 65
- 2017: Izviđač
- 2017: Bosna Sarajevo
- 2018: Železničar 1949
National team
- Years: Team
- 1999–2006: Serbia and Montenegro
- 2006–2009: Serbia
Medal record
Men's handball
Representing FR Yugoslavia
World Championship
Bronze medal – third place	1999 Egypt	Team
World University Championship
Gold medal – first place	1998 Novi Sad	Team

Ratko Nikolić (Serbian Cyrillic: Ратко Николић; born 15 September 1977) is a Serbian politician and former handball player serving as a member of the National Assembly since 8 December 2021. He is a member of the Socialist Party of Serbia (SPS).

== Club career ==
After starting out at his hometown club Šamot, Nikolić spent three seasons with Crvena zvezda (1996–1999) and four seasons with Sintelon (1999–2003). He later moved abroad and played for Fotex Veszprém (2003–2004), Altea (2004–2005), Portland San Antonio (2005–2010), Al Sadd (2010), KIF Kolding (2010–2011), Vardar (2011–2012), Dinamo Minsk (2012–2013) and Borac Banja Luka (2013–2016).

== International career ==
Nikolić made his major international debut for FR Yugoslavia at the 1999 World Championship, winning the bronze medal. He also took part in the 2000 Summer Olympics and two European Championships (2004 and 2006). Previously, Nikolić won the gold medal at the 1998 World University Championship.

Starting from late 2006, Nikolić represented Serbia and captained the team at the 2009 World Championship.

== Honours ==
Crvena zvezda

- Handball Championship of FR Yugoslavia: 1996–97, 1997–98

Sintelon

- Handball Cup of FR Yugoslavia: 1999–2000

Fotex Veszprém

- Nemzeti Bajnokság I: 2003–04
- Magyar Kupa: 2003–04

Vardar

- Macedonian Handball Cup: 2011–12
- SEHA League: 2011–12

Dinamo Minsk

- Belarusian Men's Handball Championship: 2012–13
- Belarusian Men's Handball Cup: 2012–13

Borac Banja Luka

- Handball Championship of Bosnia and Herzegovina: 2013–14, 2014–15
- Handball Cup of Bosnia and Herzegovina: 2013–14, 2014–15

== Political career ==
Nikolić is a member of the Socialist Party of Serbia (SPS). He received 39th position on SPS's electoral list for the 2020 parliamentary election. The list won 32 seats with Nikolić failing to get elected to the National Assembly. Following the death of MP Milutin Mrkonjić, Nikolić replaced him and was sworn in as MP on 8 December 2021. He received 24th position on SPS's electoral list for the 2022 parliamentary election. The list won 31 seats and Mitrović was elected to the National Assembly.
