= Mladen Bojinović =

Serbian handball player (born 1977)

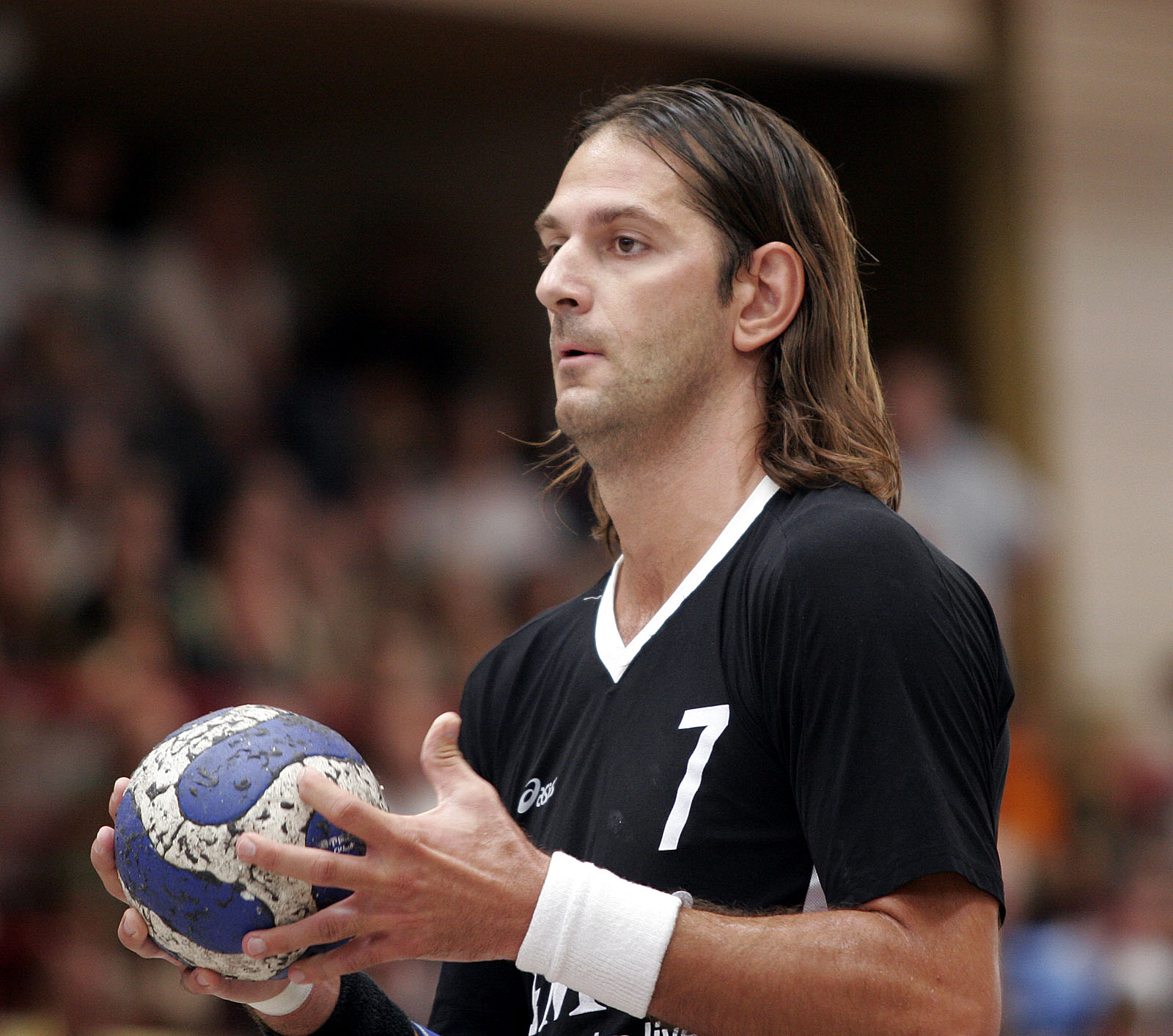
- Bojinović in 2007

Personal information
- Full name: Mladen Bojinović
- Nationality: Serbian
- Born: 17 January 1977 (age 49) Banja Luka, SR Bosnia-Herzegovina, SFR Yugoslavia
- Height: 2.02 m (6 ft 8 in)

Sport
- Sport: Handball
- Position: Centre back

Youth career
- Years: Team
- –: Borac Banja Luka
- –: Jagodina

Senior clubs
- Years: Team
- 1995–1999: Partizan
- 1999–2000: Ademar León
- 2000–2001: Bidasoa
- 2001–2002: Barcelona
- 2002–2012: Montpellier
- 2012–2015: Paris Saint-Germain
- 2015: Borac Banja Luka
- 2015–2017: Tremblay
National team
| Years | Team | | |
| 2001–2006 | Serbia and Montenegro | | |
| 2006–2011 | Serbia | 102 | (322) |
Medal record
Men's handball
Representing FR Yugoslavia
World Championship
| Bronze medal – third place | 2001 France | Team |

Mladen Bojinović (Serbian Cyrillic: Младен Бојиновић; born 17 January 1977) is a Serbian former handball player.

== Club career ==
After starting out at his hometown club Borac Banja Luka, Bojinović spent four seasons with Partizan (1995–1999) and won two trophies, before moving to Spain. He played for three Liga ASOBAL teams, namely Ademar León (1999–2000), Bidasoa (2000–2001), and Barcelona (2001–2002).

In 2002, Bojinović moved to France and stayed with Montpellier over the next decade, winning nine national championships. He also won the EHF Champions League in his debut year. In 2012, Bojinović signed with Paris Saint-Germain, helping them win their first ever national championship in the 2012–13 season.

== International career ==
Bojinović made his major international debut for FR Yugoslavia (later known as Serbia and Montenegro) at the 2001 World Championship, winning the bronze medal. He also took part at the 2002 European Championship and 2003 World Championship. Later on, Bojinović represented Serbia and participated in two more World Championships (2009 and 2011).

== Honours ==
Partizan

- Handball Championship of FR Yugoslavia: 1998–99
- Handball Cup of FR Yugoslavia: 1997–98

Barcelona

- Copa ASOBAL: 2001–02

Montpellier

- LNH Division 1: 2002–03, 2003–04, 2004–05, 2005–06, 2007–08, 2008–09, 2009–10, 2010–11, 2011–12
- Coupe de France: 2002–03, 2004–05, 2005–06, 2007–08, 2008–09, 2009–10, 2011–12
- Coupe de la Ligue: 2003–04, 2004–05, 2005–06, 2006–07, 2007–08, 2009–10, 2010–11, 2011–12
- EHF Champions League: 2002–03

Paris Saint-Germain

- LNH Division 1: 2012–13, 2014–15
- Coupe de France: 2013–14, 2014–15
