= Žikica Milosavljević =

Serbian handball player (born 1972)

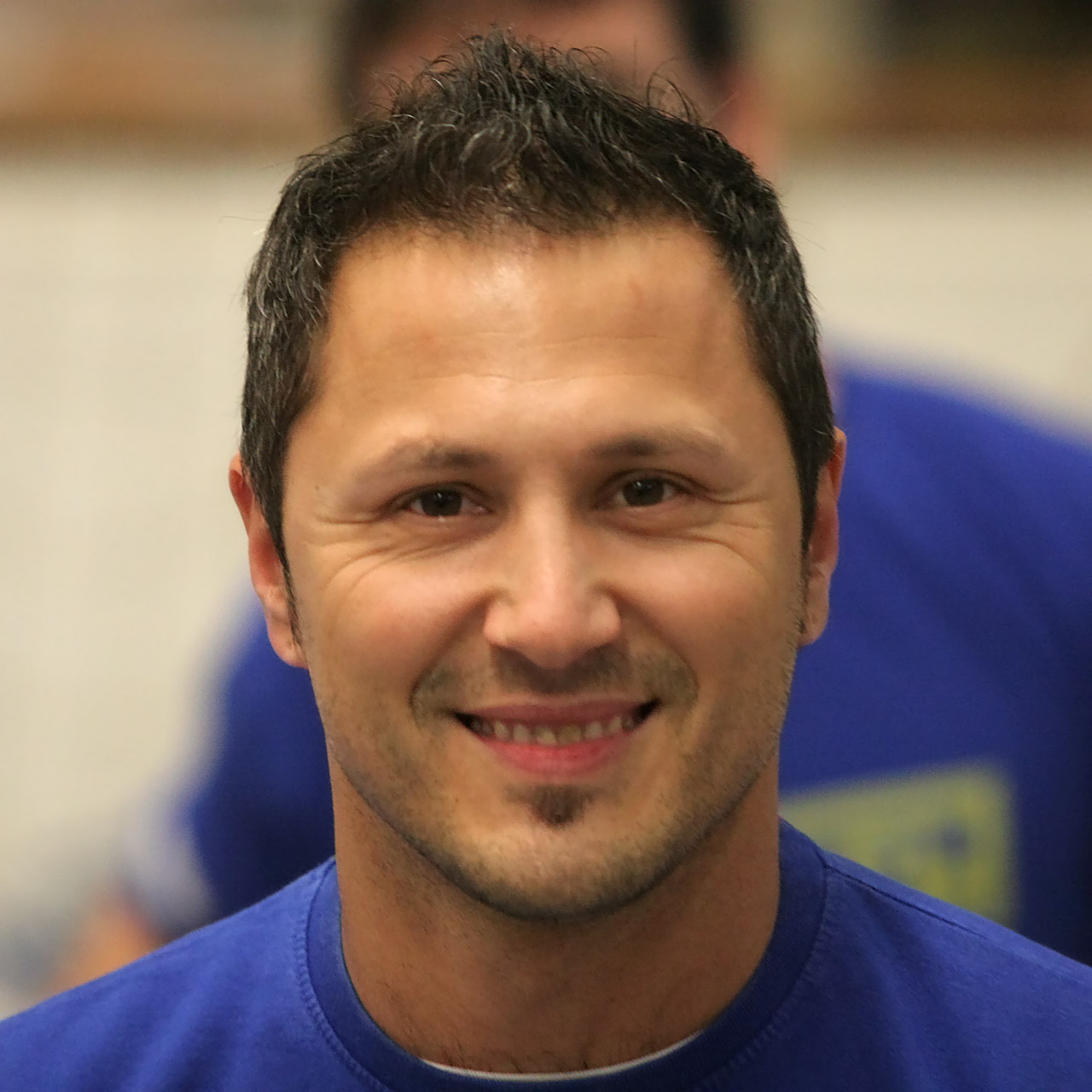
- Milosavljević in 2008

Personal information
- Full name: Žikica Milosavljević
- Nationality: Serbian
- Born: 14 January 1972 (age 54) Pančevo, SR Serbia, SFR Yugoslavia
- Height: 1.80 m (5 ft 11 in)

Sport
- Sport: Handball
- Position: Right wing
- Current club: Serbia (assistant)

Youth career
- Years: Team
- –: Dinamo Pančevo

Senior clubs
- Years: Team
- –: Dinamo Pančevo
- –: Kumanovo
- 1994–1999: Crvena zvezda
- 1999–2001: Prule 67
- 2001–2004: Celje
- 2004–2007: Cantabria
- 2007–2010: Valladolid
- 2010–2011: Bosna Sarajevo
- 2011–2012: Dinamo Pančevo
- 2013–2014: Metaloplastika
National team
- Years: Team
- 1996–2006: Serbia and Montenegro

Teams managed
- 2014–2017: Jabuka
- 2017–2018: Konjuh Živinice
- 2018–2019: Lokomotiva Brčko
- 2020–2021: Crvena zvezda
- 2020-: Serbia (assistant)
Medal record
Men's handball
Representing FR Yugoslavia
World Championship
Bronze medal – third place	1999 Egypt	Team
Bronze medal – third place	2001 France	Team
European Championship
Bronze medal – third place	1996 Spain	Team

Žikica Milosavljević (Serbian Cyrillic: Жикица Милосављевић; born 14 January 1972) is a Serbian handball coach and assistant coach Serbia national handball team and former player.

== Club career ==
After starting out at his hometown club Dinamo Pančevo, Milosavljević spent one year with Kumanovo, before joining Crvena zvezda in 1994. He played for five seasons for the club, winning three consecutive national championships.

In 1999, Milosavljević went abroad to Slovenia and spent two years with Prule 67, before switching to fellow Slovenian club Celje. He helped them win the EHF Champions League in the 2003–04 season. Later on, Milosavljević played for Spanish teams Cantabria (2004–2007) and Valladolid (2007–2010).

== International career ==
Milosavljević represented Serbia and Montenegro (known as FR Yugoslavia until 2003) in 10 major international tournaments, winning two bronze medals at the World Championships (1999 and 2001). He also participated in the 2000 Summer Olympics.

== Honours ==
Crvena zvezda

- Handball Championship of FR Yugoslavia: 1995–96, 1996–97, 1997–98
- Handball Cup of FR Yugoslavia: 1994–95, 1995–96

Celje

- Slovenian First League: 2002–03, 2003–04
- Slovenian Cup: 2003–04
- EHF Champions League: 2003–04

Valladolid

- EHF Cup Winners' Cup: 2008–09
