= Petar Kapisoda =

Montenegrin handball player (born 1976)

Personal information
- Full name: Petar Kapisoda
- Nationality: Montenegrin
- Born: 26 June 1976 (age 50) Cetinje, SR Montenegro, SFR Yugoslavia
- Height: 1.88 m (6 ft 2 in)

Sport
- Sport: Handball
- Position: Left wing

Youth career
- Years: Team
- –: Lovćen

Senior clubs
- Years: Team
- 1993–1994: Crvenka
- 1994–1996: Partizan
- 1996–1998: Crvena zvezda
- 1998–2002: Lovćen
- 2002–2003: Partizan
- 2004–2005: Bosna Sarajevo
- 2005–2007: Zagreb
- 2007–2011: Bosna Sarajevo
- 2011–2013: West HBC
National team
- Years: Team
- 1995–2006: Serbia and Montenegro
- 2006–2013: Montenegro
Medal record
Men's handball
Representing FR Yugoslavia
World Championship
Bronze medal – third place	1999 Egypt	Team
Bronze medal – third place	2001 France	Team

Petar Kapisoda (Serbian Cyrillic: Петар Каписода; born 26 June 1976) is a Montenegrin former handball player.

== Club career ==
After starting out at his hometown club Lovćen, Kapisoda moved to Crvenka. He later played for Partizan (1994–1996) and Crvena zvezda (1996–1998). Subsequently, Kapisoda returned to his parent club Lovćen, helping them win back-to-back championships in 2000 and 2001.

== International career ==
With FR Yugoslavia, Kapisoda won two bronze medals at the World Championships (1999 and 2001). He also participated in the 2000 Summer Olympics and 2006 European Championship. After the split of Serbia and Montenegro, Kapisoda represented Montenegro at the 2008 European Championship and 2013 World Championship.

== Personal life ==
Kapisoda is the older brother of the late model Filip Kapisoda.

== Honours ==
Partizan

- Handball Championship of FR Yugoslavia: 1994–95, 2002–03

Crvena zvezda

- Handball Championship of FR Yugoslavia: 1996–97, 1997–98

Lovćen

- Handball Championship of FR Yugoslavia: 1999–2000, 2000–01
- Handball Cup of FR Yugoslavia: 2001–02

Bosna Sarajevo

- Handball Championship of Bosnia and Herzegovina: 2007–08, 2008–09, 2009–10, 2010–11
- Handball Cup of Bosnia and Herzegovina: 2007–08, 2008–09, 2009–10
