= Vladimir Petrić =

Serbian handball player (born 1975)

Personal information
- Full name: Vladimir Petrić
- Nationality: Serbian
- Born: 5 August 1975 (age 51) Valjevo, SFR Yugoslavia
- Height: 1.89 m (6 ft 2 in)

Sport
- Sport: Handball
- Position: Right back

Youth career
- Years: Team
- –: Crvena zvezda

Senior clubs
- Years: Team
- 1994–1999: Crvena zvezda
- 1999–2000: Fotex Veszprém
- 2000–2005: Porto
- 2005–2008: Almería
- 2008–2009: Cuenca
- 2009–2011: Sporting CP
- 2011–2015: Vardar
National team
- Years: Team
- 1998–2006: Serbia and Montenegro
Medal record
Men's handball
Representing FR Yugoslavia
World Championship
Bronze medal – third place	1999 Egypt	Team
World University Championship
Gold medal – first place	1998 Novi Sad	Team

Vladimir Petrić (Serbian Cyrillic: Владимир Петрић; born 5 August 1975) is a Serbian former handball player.

== Club career ==
Petrić made his professional debut with Crvena zvezda and spent five seasons with the club (1994–1999), before moving abroad. He would go on to play for Fotex Veszprém (1999–2000), Porto (2000–2005), Almería (2005–2008), Cuenca (2008–2009), Sporting CP (2009–2011) and Vardar (2011–2015).

== International career ==
Petrić represented Serbia and Montenegro (known as FR Yugoslavia until 2003) in international tournaments, taking part in three World Championships (1999, 2003, and 2005) and four European Championships (1998, 2002, 2004, and 2006). He previously won the gold medal at the 1998 World University Championship.

== Honours ==
Crvena zvezda

- Handball Championship of FR Yugoslavia: 1995–96, 1996–97, 1997–98
- Handball Cup of FR Yugoslavia: 1994–95, 1995–96

Fotex Veszprém

- Magyar Kupa: 1999–2000

Porto

- Andebol 1: 2001–02, 2002–03, 2003–04

Vardar

- Macedonian Handball Super League: 2012–13, 2014–15
- Macedonian Handball Cup: 2011–12, 2013–14, 2014–15
- SEHA League: 2011–12, 2013–14
