= Nikola Eklemović =

Serbian-Hungarian handball player (born 1978)

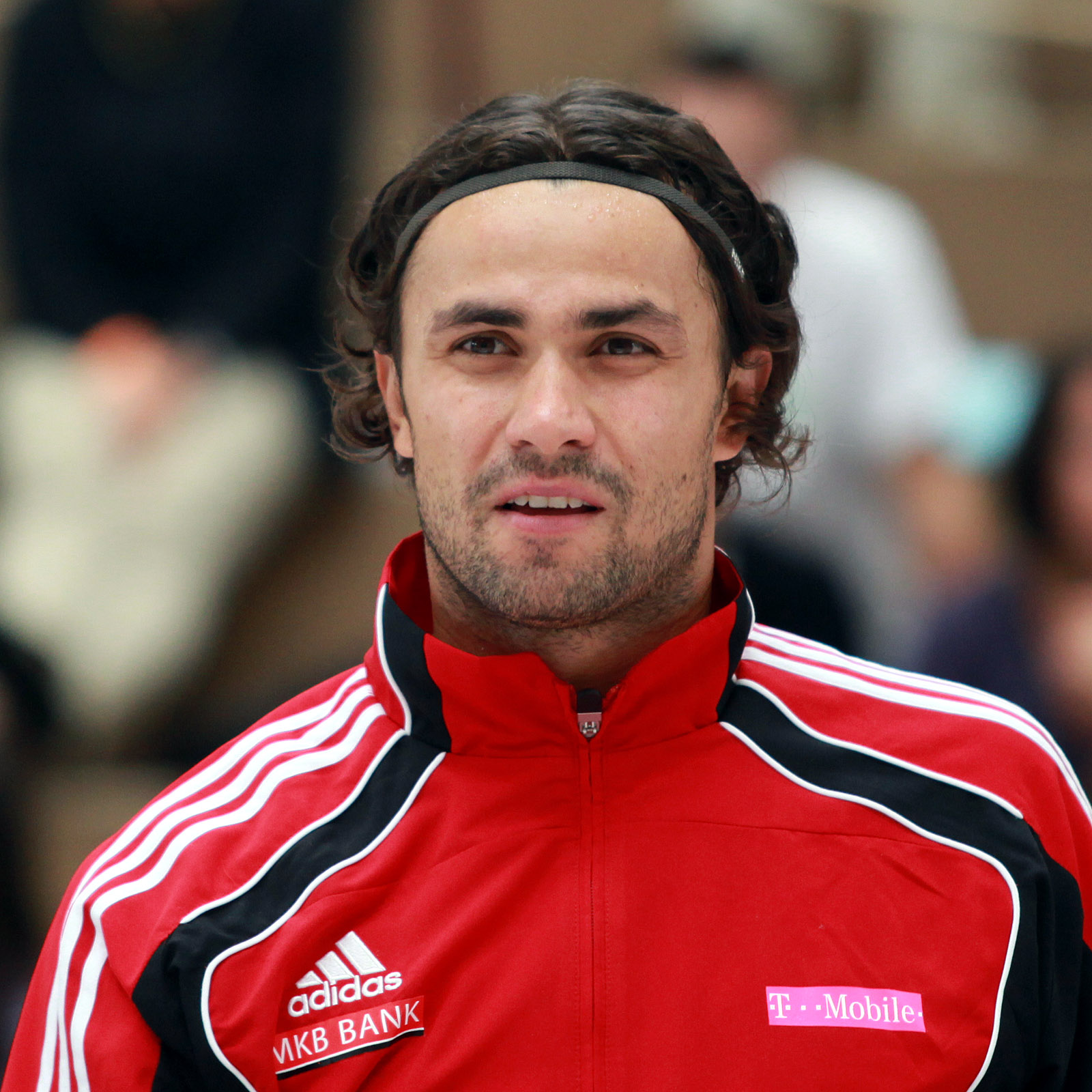
- Eklemović in 2010

Personal information
- Full name: Nikola Eklemović
- Nationality: Serbian / Hungarian
- Born: 8 February 1978 (age 48) Belgrade, SFR Yugoslavia
- Height: 1.93 m (6 ft 4 in)

Sport
- Sport: Handball
- Position: Centre back

Youth career
- Years: Team
- –: Partizan

Senior clubs
- Years: Team
- 1993–1996: Partizan
- 1996–1999: Crvena zvezda
- 1999–2004: Pick Szeged
- 2004–2011: MKB Veszprém
- 2011–2014: Wisła Płock
- 2014–2015: Minaur Baia Mare
National team
Years	Team		
2000–2005	Serbia and Montenegro		
2008–2010	Hungary	34	(86)
Medal record
Men's handball
Representing FR Yugoslavia
World University Championship
Gold medal – first place	1998 Novi Sad	Team

Nikola Eklemović (Serbian Cyrillic: Никола Еклемовић, Hungarian: Eklemovics Nikola; born 8 February 1978) is a Serbian-Hungarian former handball player.

== Club career ==
Eklemović made his professional debut with Partizan and spent three seasons with the club (1993–1996). He also played for their arch-rivals Crvena zvezda for three years (1996–1999), before moving abroad. Later on, Eklemović spent over a decade in Hungary, switching two clubs: Pick Szeged (1999–2004) and MKB Veszprém (2004–2011). He subsequently moved to Poland and remained for three years with Wisła Płock (2011–2014). Before retiring from the game, Eklemović played for Romanian club Minaur Baia Mare in the 2014–15 season.

== International career ==
Eklemović won the gold medal at the 1998 World University Championship. He also represented Serbia and Montenegro at the 2004 European Championship. Later on, Eklemović switched allegiance to Hungary, taking part in two European Championships (2008 and 2010) and one World Championship (2009).

== Honours ==
Partizan

- Handball Championship of FR Yugoslavia: 1993–94, 1994–95
- Handball Cup of FR Yugoslavia: 1993–94

Crvena zvezda

- Handball Championship of FR Yugoslavia: 1996–97, 1997–98

MKB Veszprém

- Nemzeti Bajnokság I: 2004–05, 2005–06, 2007–08, 2008–09, 2009–10, 2010–11
- Magyar Kupa: 2004–05, 2006–07, 2008–09, 2009–10, 2010–11
- EHF Cup Winners' Cup: 2007–08

Minaur Baia Mare

- Liga Națională: 2014–15
- Cupa României: 2014–15
