= Damjan Blečić =

Serbian handball player (born 1980)

Personal information
- Full name: Damjan Blečić
- Nationality: Serbian
- Born: 20 March 1980 (age 46) Belgrade, SFR Yugoslavia
- Height: 1.98 m (6 ft 6 in)

Sport
- Sport: Handball
- Position: Left Back
- Current club: RK Crvena zvezda
- Number: 9

Senior clubs
- Years: Team
- 1997–2003: RK Crvena zvezda
- 2003–2004: RK Partizan
- 2004–2005: Pontault-Combault
- 2005–2006: Frisch Auf Göppingen
- 2006–2007: TuS N-Lübbecke
- 2007–2008: Teka Cantabria
- 2008–2009: Bjerringbro-Silkeborg
- 2009–2010: Viborg HK
- 2010–2011: RK Metalurg Skopje
- 2011: Al Jazira
- 2011–2012: RK Crvena zvezda
- 2012: Al Shamal
- 2012–2013: US Créteil Handball
- 2013–2014: HC Odorheiu Secuiesc
- 2017-: RK Crvena zvezda
National team
- Years: Team
- –: Serbia

Damjan Blečić (born 20 March 1980 in Belgrade) is a Serbian handballer who plays for RK Crvena zvezda in the Serbian Superleague.

== International honours ==
- EHF Cup:
  - Finalist: 2006
