= Dejan Perić =

Serbian handball player (born 1970)

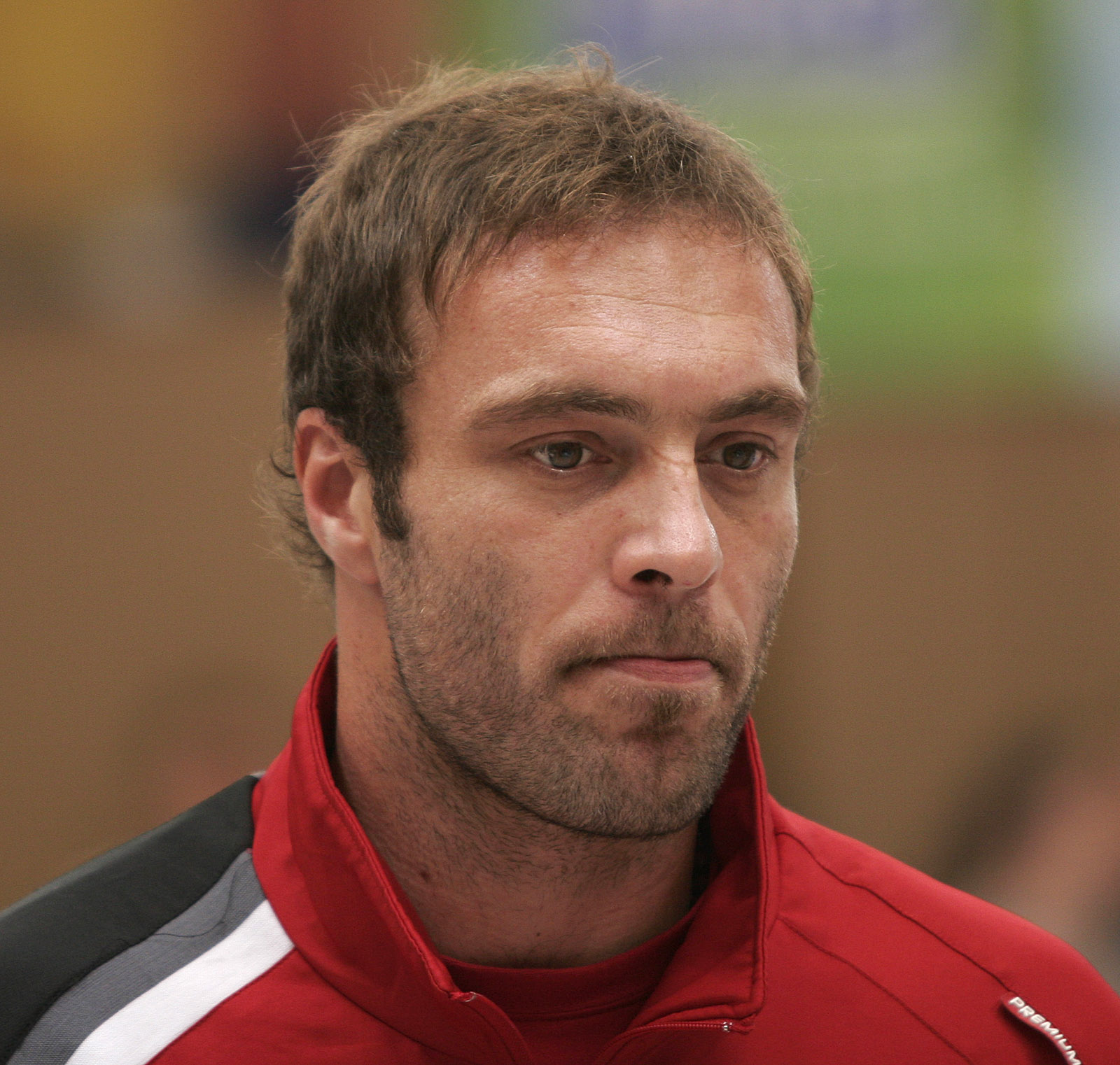
- Perić in 2007

Personal information
- Full name: Dejan Perić
- Nationality: Serbian
- Born: 22 September 1970 (age 56) Bečej, SR Serbia, SFR Yugoslavia
- Height: 1.86 m (6 ft 1 in)

Sport
- Sport: Handball
- Position: Goalkeeper
- Current club: Füchse Berlin (GK coach)

Youth career
- Years: Team
- –: Dinamo Pančevo

Senior clubs
- Years: Team
- 1988–1990: Crvena zvezda
- 1990–1991: Pelister
- 1991–1993: Crvena zvezda
- 1993–1994: Atlético Madrid
- 1994–1995: Teucro
- 1995–2004: Celje
- 2004–2006: Barcelona
- 2006–2011: MKB Veszprém
- 2011–2013: Celje
National team
- Years: Team
- 1990–1992: Yugoslavia
- 1995–2004: Serbia and Montenegro
- 2009–2010: Serbia

Teams managed
- 2009–2010: Serbia (assistant)
- 2014–2016: Serbia
- 2018–2020: RK Vardar (GK coach)
- 2018–2020: Russia (assistant)
- 2020–: Füchse Berlin (GK coach)
Medal record
Men's handball
Representing Yugoslavia
Goodwill Games
| Silver medal – second place | 1990 Seattle | Team |
Mediterranean Games
| Gold medal – first place | 1991 Athens | Team |
Representing FR Yugoslavia
World Championship
| Bronze medal – third place | 1999 Egypt | Team |
European Championship
| Bronze medal – third place | 1996 Spain | Team |

Dejan Perić (Serbian Cyrillic: Дејан Перић; born 22 September 1970) is a Serbian former handball player and current coach.

He was inducted into the EHF Hall of Fame in 2024.

== Club career ==
Over the course of his career that spanned almost three decades, Perić played for Crvena zvezda (1988–1990 and 1991–1993), Pelister (1990–1991), Atlético Madrid (1993–1994), Teucro (1994–1995), Celje (1995–2004 and 2011–2013), Barcelona (2004–2006) and MKB Veszprém (2006–2011). He won two consecutive EHF Champions League titles in the 2003–04 (with Celje) and 2004–05 (with Barcelona) seasons.

== International career ==
At international level, Perić represented Serbia and Montenegro (known as FR Yugoslavia until 2003) in eight major tournaments, winning two bronze medals (1996 European Championship and 1999 World Championship). He also participated in the 2000 Summer Olympics.

== Coaching career ==
While still a player, Perić served as an assistant to Sead Hasanefendić with the Serbia men's national handball team from 2009 to 2010. He independently led the team between 2014 and 2016, taking part in the 2016 European Championship.

== Honours ==
Celje

- Slovenian First League: 1995–96, 1996–97, 1997–98, 1998–99, 1999–2000, 2000–01, 2002–03, 2003–04
- Slovenian Cup: 1995–96, 1996–97, 1997–98, 1998–99, 1999–2000, 2000–01, 2003–04, 2011–12, 2012–13
- EHF Champions League: 2003–04

Barcelona

- Liga ASOBAL: 2005–06
- EHF Champions League: 2004–05

MKB Veszprém

- Nemzeti Bajnokság I: 2007–08, 2008–09, 2009–10, 2010–11
- Magyar Kupa: 2006–07, 2008–09, 2009–10, 2010–11
- EHF Cup Winners' Cup: 2007–08
