= Nenad Puljezević =

Serbian-Hungarian handball player (born 1973)

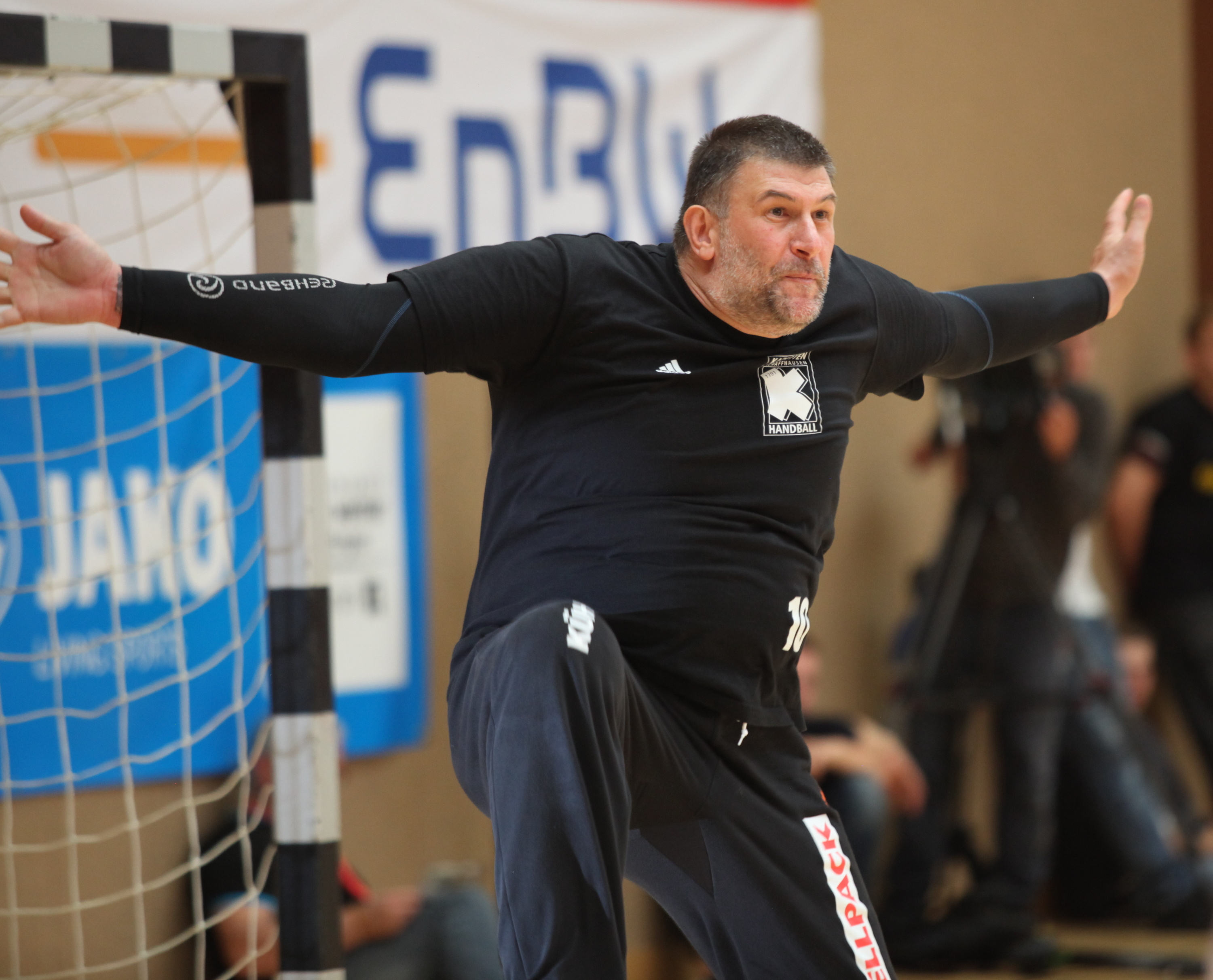
- Puljezević in 2014

Personal information
- Full name: Nenad Puljezević
- Nationality: Serbian / Hungarian
- Born: 13 March 1973 (age 53) Belgrade, SFR Yugoslavia
- Height: 1.95 m (6 ft 5 in)

Sport
- Sport: Handball
- Position: Goalkeeper

Youth career
- Years: Team
- –: BASK

Senior clubs
- Years: Team
- 1990–1994: Crvena zvezda
- 1994–1996: Partizan
- 1996–1998: Crvena zvezda
- 1998–2002: Lovćen
- 2002–2009: Pick Szeged
- 2009: Kolubara
- 2009–2013: TSV Hannover-Burgdorf
- 2014: TV Hüttenberg
- 2014–2015: Kadetten Schaffhausen
National team
Years	Team		
2001–2002	FR Yugoslavia		
2007–2010	Hungary	45	(0)
Medal record
Men's handball
Representing FR Yugoslavia
World Championship
Bronze medal – third place	2001 France	Team

Nenad Puljezević (Serbian Cyrillic: Ненад Пуљезевић, Hungarian: Puljezevics Nenad; born 13 March 1973) is a Serbian-Hungarian former handball player.

== Club career ==
Puljezević made his professional debut with Crvena zvezda and spent four seasons with the club (1990–1994). He would also play for two years at Partizan (1994–1996), before returning to Crvena zvezda for another two seasons (1996–1998). Between 1998 and 2002, Puljezević played with Lovćen, helping the club win back-to-back championships in 2000 and 2001.

In 2002, Puljezević moved abroad to Hungary and joined Pick Szeged, spending the next seven years with the club. He subsequently returned to his homeland and briefly played for Kolubara. In late 2009, Puljezević moved to Germany and joined TSV Hannover-Burgdorf. He decided to retire after the 2012–13 season. However, Puljezević came out of retirement and signed with TV Hüttenberg in April 2014.

== International career ==
Puljezević represented FR Yugoslavia in two major tournaments, winning the bronze medal at the 2001 World Championship. He later switched allegiance to Hungary and appeared in two more World Championships (2007 and 2009) and two European Championships (2008 and 2010).

== Honours ==
Partizan

- Handball Championship of FR Yugoslavia: 1994–95

Crvena zvezda

- Handball Championship of FR Yugoslavia: 1996–97, 1997–98

Lovćen

- Handball Championship of FR Yugoslavia: 1999–2000, 2000–01
- Handball Cup of FR Yugoslavia: 2001–02

Pick Szeged

- Nemzeti Bajnokság I: 2006–07
- Magyar Kupa: 2005–06, 2007–08

Kadetten Schaffhausen

- Swiss Handball League: 2014–15
