= Zlatan Arnautović =

Serbian handball player (born 1956)

Personal information
- Full name: Zlatan Arnautović
- Nationality: Bosnier
- Born: 2 September 1956 (age 70) Prijedor, PR Bosnia-Herzegovina, FPR Yugoslavia
- Height: 1.94 m (6 ft 4 in)

Sport
- Sport: Handball
- Position: Goalkeeper

Senior clubs
- Years: Team
- –: Bosnamontaža
- –1986: Borac Banja Luka
- 1986–1987: Barcelona
- 1987–1989: Lagisa Naranco
- –: Borac Banja Luka
National team
Years	Team	Apps	(Gls)
1978–1986	Yugoslavia	157	(1)

Teams managed
- –: Crvena zvezda
- 1999: Partizan
- 2006-2007: Tunisia (GK coach)
- 2007-2011: Crvena zvezda (GK coach)
Medal record
Men's handball
Representing Yugoslavia
Olympic Games
Gold medal – first place	1984 Los Angeles	Team
World Championship
Gold medal – first place	1986 Switzerland	Team
Mediterranean Games
Gold medal – first place	1983 Casablanca	Team

Zlatan Arnautović (Serbian Cyrillic: Златан Арнаутовић; born 2 September 1956) is a Serbian former handball coach and player who competed for Yugoslavia in the 1980 Summer Olympics and in the 1984 Summer Olympics.

== Club career ==
Born in Prijedor, Arnautović started playing handball at his hometown club Bosnamontaža. He later played for Borac Banja Luka, Barcelona, and Lagisa Naranco.

== International career ==
At international level, Arnautović competed for Yugoslavia in two Olympic Games, winning the gold medal at the 1984 Summer Olympics. He was also a regular member of the team that won the 1986 World Championship.

== Coaching career ==
During the 1990s, Arnautović served as head coach of both Crvena zvezda and Partizan. From 2006 he was the goalkeeping coach for the Tunisian national team. From 2007 he became the goalkeeping and assistant coach at Crvena zvezda. He left the team in 2011, after being physically attacked by head coach Nenad Peruničić.

== Personal life ==
His surname derives from Arnaut, the Ottoman Turkish ethnonym for Albanians.

== Honours ==
=== Player ===
Borac Banja Luka

- Yugoslav Handball Championship: 1980–81
- Yugoslav Handball Cup: 1978–79
- EHF Cup: 1990–91

=== Coach ===
Crvena zvezda

- Handball Championship of FR Yugoslavia: 1997–98
