= Nikola Manojlović (handballer) =

Serbian handball player (born 1981)

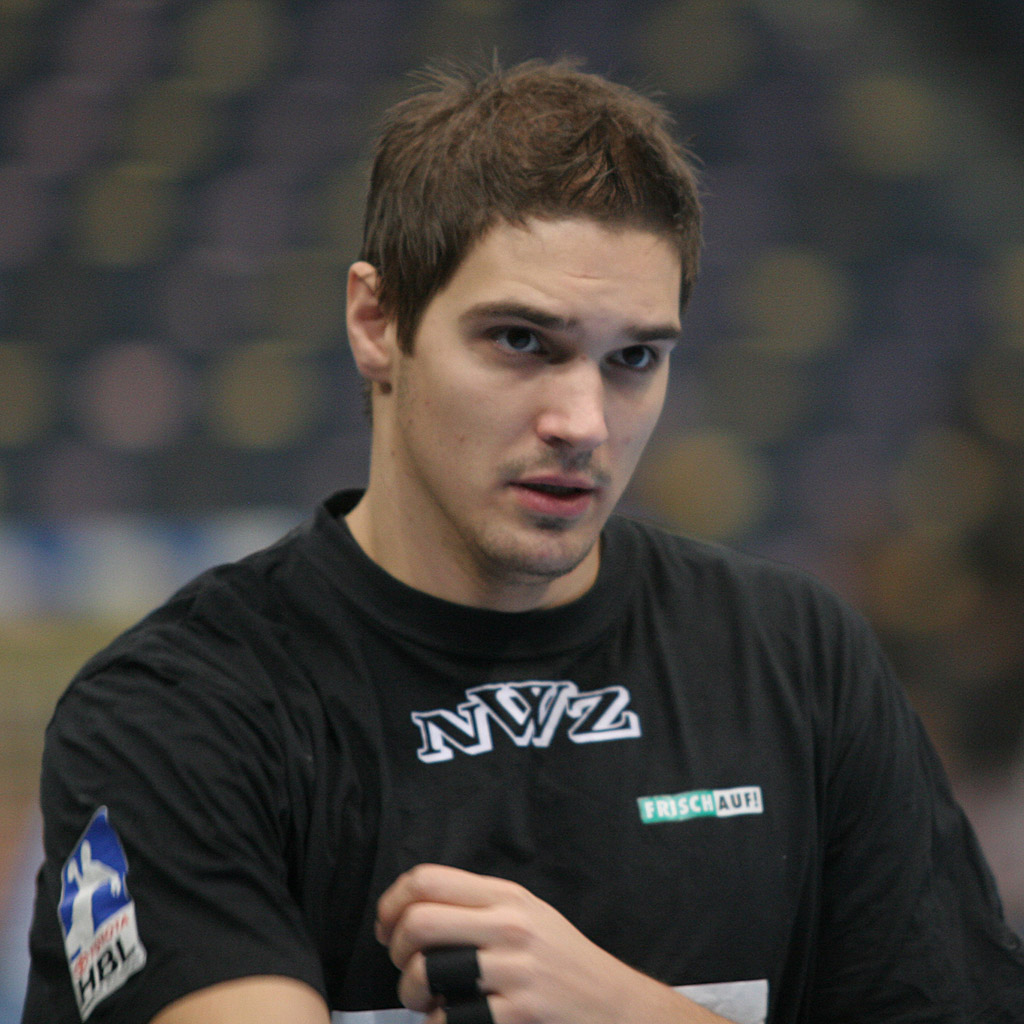
- Manojlović in 2008

Personal information
- Full name: Nikola Manojlović
- Nationality: Serbian
- Born: 1 December 1981 (age 44) Belgrade, SFR Yugoslavia
- Height: 1.96 m (6 ft 5 in)

Sport
- Sport: Handball
- Position: Left back

Senior clubs
- Years: Team
- 1999–2004: Crvena zvezda
- 2005: Pfadi Winterthur
- 2005–2009: Frisch Auf Göppingen
- 2009: HCM Constanța
- 2009–2010: Rhein-Neckar Löwen
- 2010–2012: Gorenje Velenje
- 2012–2013: Koper
- 2013–2014: Rhein-Neckar Löwen
- 2014–2015: Meshkov Brest
- 2016: TuS Nettelstedt-Lübbecke
National team
- Years: Team
- 2004–2006: Serbia and Montenegro
- 2006–2014: Serbia
Medal record
Men's handball
Representing Serbia
European Championship
Silver medal – second place	2012 Serbia	Team

Nikola Manojlović (Serbian Cyrillic: Никола Манојловић; born 1 December 1981) is a Serbian former handball player.

== Club career ==
After starting out at his hometown club Crvena zvezda, Manojlović moved abroad to Swiss team Pfadi Winterthur in early 2005. He would go on to play in Germany (Frisch Auf Göppingen, Rhein-Neckar Löwen, and TuS Nettelstedt-Lübbecke), Romania (HCM Constanța), Slovenia (Gorenje Velenje and Koper), and Belarus (Meshkov Brest).

== International career ==
At international level, Manojlović represented Serbia and Montenegro at the 2006 European Championship. He would later play for Serbia in three major tournaments, winning the silver medal at the 2012 European Championship.

== Honours ==
Crvena zvezda

- Serbia and Montenegro Handball Super League: 2003–04
- Serbia and Montenegro Handball Cup: 2003–04

Gorenje Velenje

- Slovenian First League: 2011–12

Meshkov Brest

- Belarusian Men's Handball Championship: 2014–15
- Belarusian Men's Handball Cup: 2014–15
