= Rastko Stojković =

Serbian handball player (born 1981)

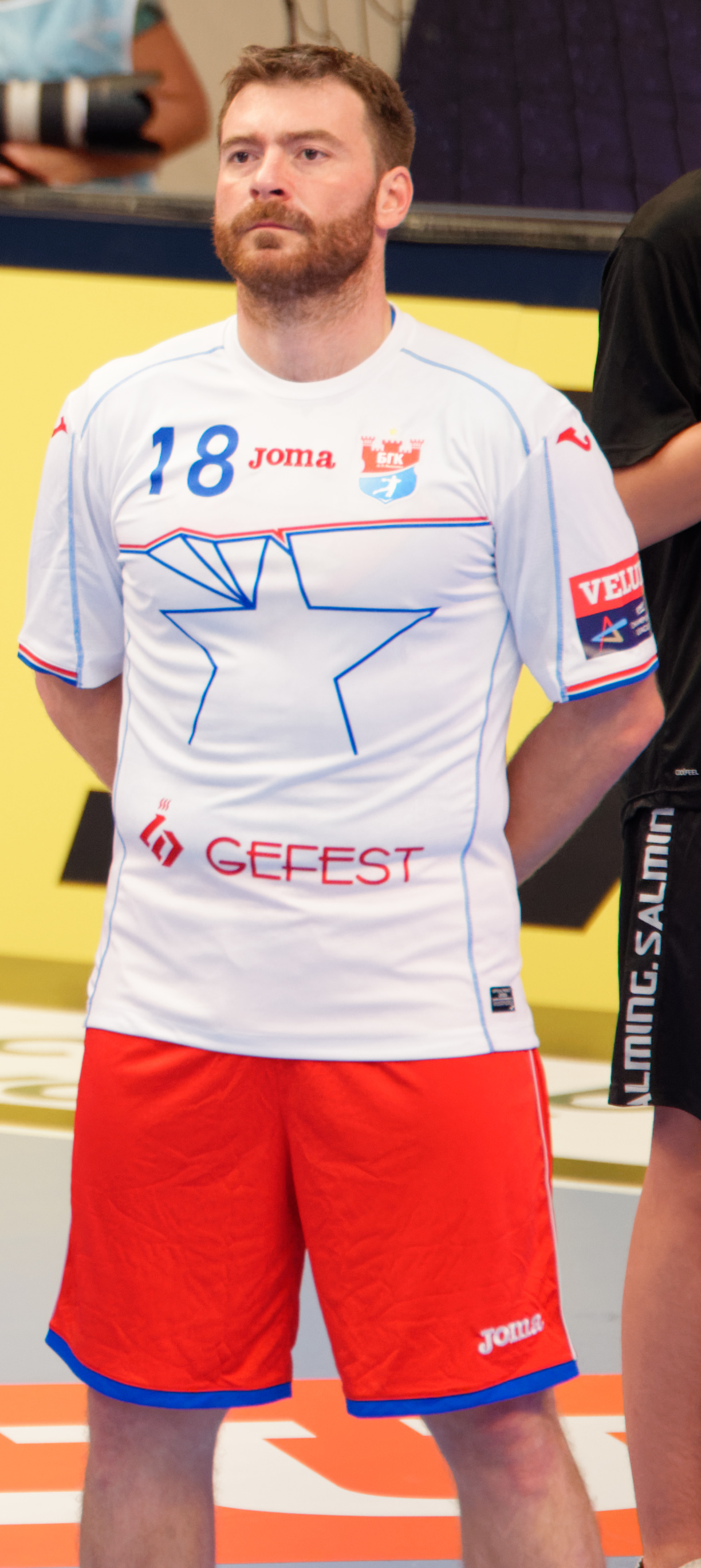
- Stojković in 2017

Personal information
- Full name: Rastko Stojković
- Nationality: Serbian
- Born: 12 July 1981 (age 45) Belgrade, SFR Yugoslavia
- Height: 1.91 m (6 ft 3 in)

Sport
- Sport: Handball
- Position: Pivot
- Current club: Pfadi Winterthur

Senior clubs
- Years: Team
- 1998–1999: RK Partizan
- 1999–2001: Studentski grad
- 2001–2002: Borac Banja Luka
- 2002–2003: PKB
- 2003–2005: RK Crvena zvezda
- 2005–2006: VfL Pfullingen
- 2006–2009: HSG Nordhorn
- 2009–2013: Vive Kielce
- 2013: RK Crvena zvezda
- 2013: Al Rayyan
- 2014–2018: HC Meshkov Brest
- 2018–2019: Maccabi Rishon LeZion
- 2019: RK Rekreativo
- 2020: RK Vojvodina
- 2021: Pfadi Winterthur
National team
- Years: Team
- 2007–2017: Serbia
Medal record
Men's handball
Representing Serbia
European Championship
Silver medal – second place	2012 Serbia	Team

Rastko Stojković (Serbian Cyrillic: Растко Стојковић; born 12 July 1981) is a Serbian handball player who plays for Pfadi Winterthur.

== Club career ==
Over the course of his career that spanned over two decades, Stojković played for Partizan, Studentski grad, Borac Banja Luka, PKB, Crvena zvezda, VfL Pfullingen, HSG Nordhorn, Vive Kielce, Al Rayyan, Meshkov Brest, Maccabi Rishon LeZion, Rekreativo, and Vojvodina.

== International career ==
At international level, Stojković represented Serbia in three major tournaments, winning the silver medal at the 2012 European Championship.

== Honours ==
Crvena zvezda

- Serbia and Montenegro Handball Super League: 2003–04
- Serbia and Montenegro Handball Cup: 2003–04

HSG Nordhorn

- EHF Cup: 2007–08
