= Ivan Nikčević =

Serbian handball player (born 1981)

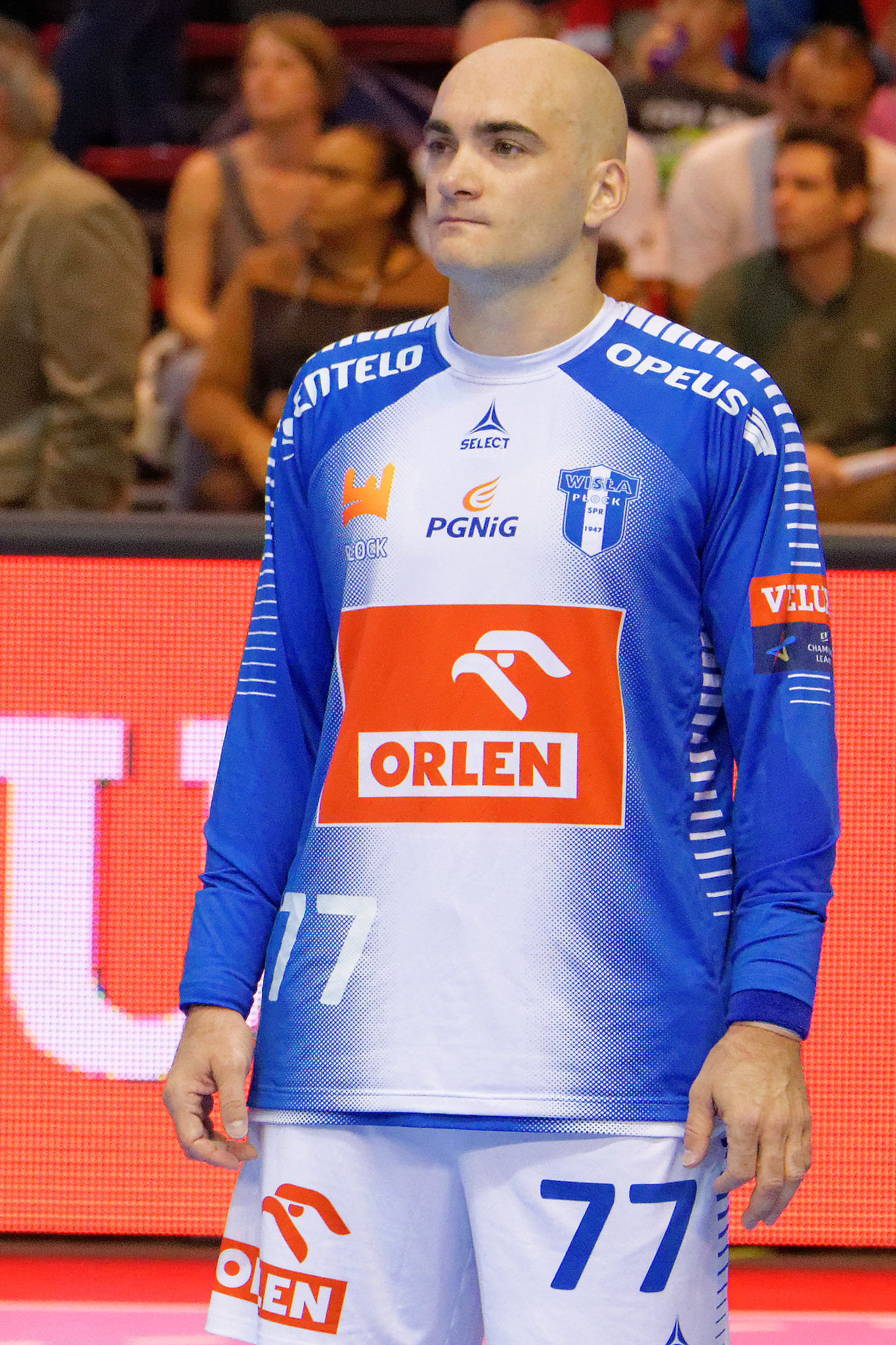
- Nikčević in 2015

Personal information
- Full name: Ivan Nikčević
- Nationality: Serbian
- Born: 11 February 1981 (age 45) Nikšić, SR Montenegro, SFR Yugoslavia
- Height: 1.81 m (5 ft 11 in)

Sport
- Sport: Handball
- Position: Left wing

Youth career
- Years: Team
- –: Sutjeska Nikšić

Senior clubs
- Years: Team
- 1998–2005: Crvena zvezda
- 2005–2007: Altea
- 2007–2008: Almería
- 2008–2010: Portland San Antonio
- 2010–2011: Granollers
- 2011–2012: Valladolid
- 2012–2016: Wisła Płock
- 2016–2020: Sporting CP
- 2020–2023: Benidorm
National team
- Years: Team
- –: Serbia and Montenegro
- 2006–2016: Serbia
Medal record
Men's handball
Representing Serbia
European Championship
Silver medal – second place	2012 Serbia	Team

Ivan Nikčević (Serbian Cyrillic: Иван Никчевић; born 11 February 1981) is a Serbian former handball player.

== Club career ==
Over the course of his career that spanned more than two decades, Nikčević played for Crvena zvezda (1998–2005), Altea (2005–2007), Almería (2007–2008), Portland San Antonio (2008–2010), Granollers (2010–2011), Valladolid (2011–2012), Wisła Płock (2012–2016) and Sporting CP (2016–2020). He helped the Portuguese club win the EHF Challenge Cup in the 2016–17 season.

== International career ==
A Serbia international since its inception, Nikčević made his major debut for the national team at the 2009 World Men's Handball Championship. He was also a member of the team that won the silver medal at the 2012 European Men's Handball Championship. After serving as team captain at the 2016 European Men's Handball Championship, Nikčević retired from the national team.

== Honours ==
Crvena zvezda

- Serbia and Montenegro Handball Super League: 2003–04
- Serbia and Montenegro Handball Cup: 2003–04

Sporting CP

- Andebol 1: 2016–17, 2017–18
- EHF Challenge Cup: 2016–17
