= Zoran Đorđić =

Serbian handball player (born 1966)

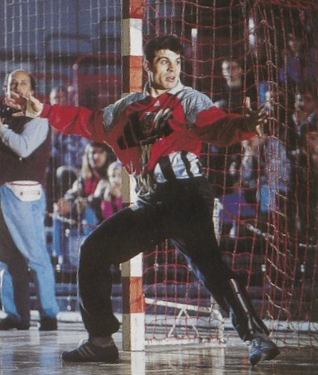

Personal information
- Nationality: Serbian
- Born: 15 October 1966 (age 60) Šabac, SR Serbia, SFR Yugoslavia
- Height: 1.86 m (6 ft 1 in)

Sport
- Sport: Handball
- Position: Goalkeeper

Youth career
- Years: Team
- –: Metaloplastika

Senior clubs
- Years: Team
- 1986–1992: Metaloplastika
- 1992–1993: Partizan
- 1993–1995: OM Vitrolles
- 1995–1997: Chambéry
- 1997–2005: SG Wallau-Massenheim
- 2005–2007: MT Melsungen
- 2007–2009: HSG Wetzlar
- 2012: HSV Hamburg
National team
- Years: Team
- 1995–2001: FR Yugoslavia
Medal record
Men's handball
Representing FR Yugoslavia
World Championship
Bronze medal – third place	1999 Egypt	Team
Bronze medal – third place	2001 France	Team
European Championship
Bronze medal – third place	1996 Spain	Team

Zoran Đorđić (Serbian Cyrillic: Зоран Ђорђић; born 15 October 1966) is a Serbian former handball player. He is the father of fellow handball player Petar Đorđić.

== Club career ==
In his home country, Đorđić played for Metaloplastika (1986–1992) and Partizan (1992–1993), before going abroad. He would spend four seasons in France with OM Vitrolles (1993–1995) and Chambéry (1995–1997). In 1997, Đorđić moved to Germany and joined SG Wallau-Massenheim, remaining eight seasons with the club. He later also played for MT Melsungen (2005–2007) and HSG Wetzlar (2007–2009).

In March 2012, Đorđić came out of retirement and signed with HSV Hamburg to replace the injured Johannes Bitter until the end of the season.

In 2004/05 season of Handball Bundesliga he set the Handball Bundesliga record for most goals in a season by a goalkeeper with 5 goals, which was matched a couple of times later on and finally surpassed in 2023/24. And he jointly holds record for most goals by a goalkeeper in a Handball Bundesliga match, which he first set, with 3.

== International career ==
At international level, Đorđić represented FR Yugoslavia in five major tournaments, winning two bronze medals at the World Championships (1999 and 2001). He also participated in two European Championships (1996 and 1998).

== Honours ==
Metaloplastika

- Yugoslav Handball Championship: 1986–87, 1987–88

Partizan

- Handball Championship of FR Yugoslavia: 1992–93
- Handball Cup of FR Yugoslavia: 1992–93

OM Vitrolles

- Championnat de France: 1993–94
- Coupe de France: 1994–95
