= Ivan Stanković (handballer) =

Serbian handball player (born 1982)

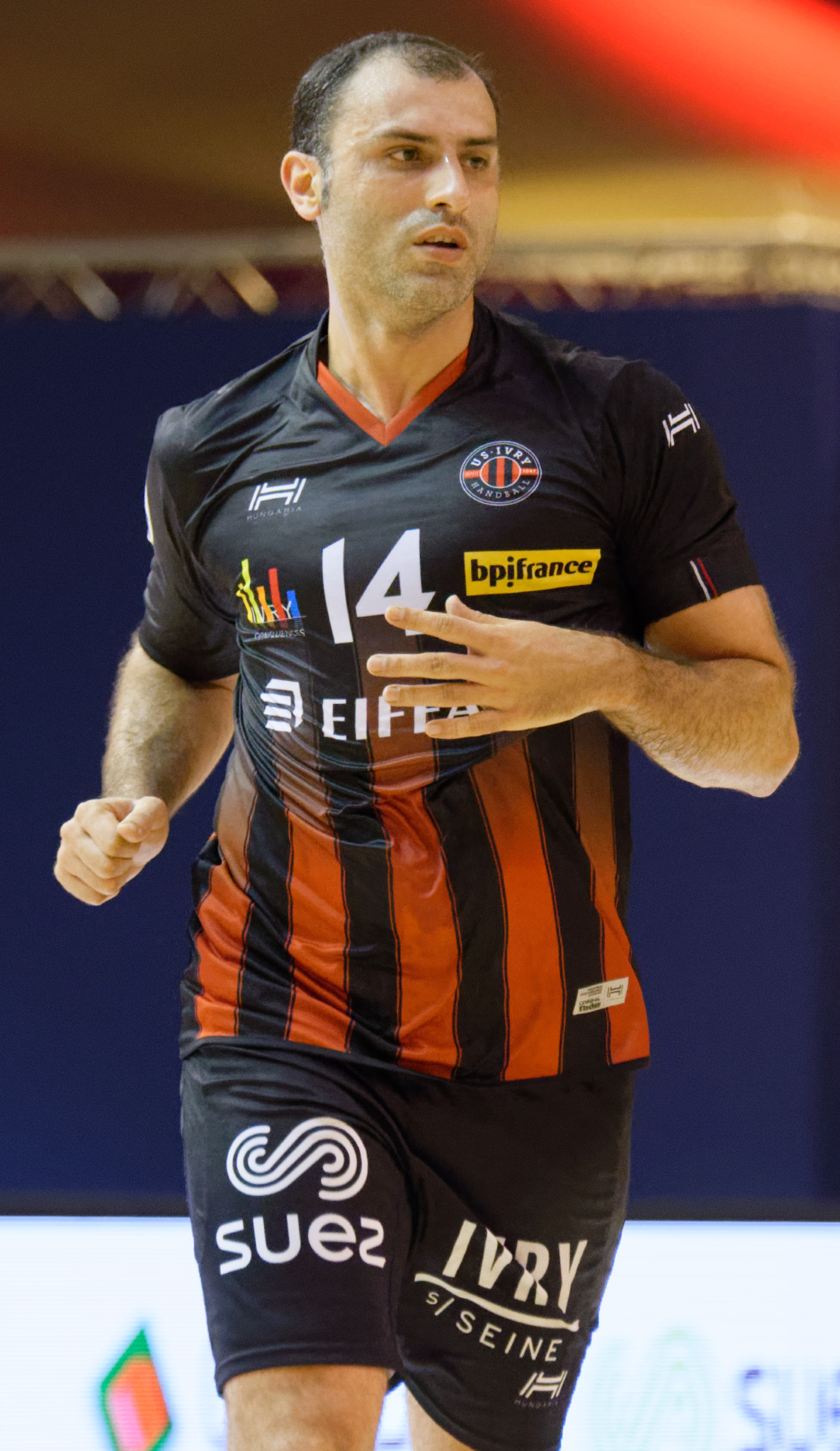
- Stanković in 2016

Personal information
- Full name: Ivan Stanković
- Nationality: Serbian
- Born: 27 April 1982 (age 44) Belgrade, SR Serbia, SFR Yugoslavia
- Height: 1.94 m (6 ft 4 in)

Sport
- Sport: Handball
- Position: Right back

Senior clubs
- Years: Team
- 1999–2004: Partizan
- 2004–2007: Bidasoa
- 2007–2011: Aragón
- 2011–2014: US Créteil
- 2014–2017: US Ivry
National team
- Years: Team
- 2009–2013: Serbia
Medal record
Men's handball
Representing Serbia
European Championship
Silver medal – second place	2012 Serbia	Team

Ivan Stanković (Serbian Cyrillic: Иван Станковић; born 27 April 1982) is a Serbian former handball player.

== Club career ==
Over the course of his career that spanned almost two decades, Stanković played for Partizan (1999–2004), Bidasoa (2004–2007), Aragón (2007–2011), US Créteil (2011–2014) and US Ivry (2014–2017). He won two championship titles with Partizan.

== International career ==
At international level, Stanković represented Serbia in five major tournaments. He was a member of the team that won the silver medal at the 2012 European Championship. Later that year, Stanković took part in the 2012 Summer Olympics.

== Honours ==
Partizan

- Serbia and Montenegro Handball Super League: 2001–02, 2002–03
- Serbia and Montenegro Handball Cup: 2000–01
