= Igor Butulija =

Serbian handball player (born 1970)

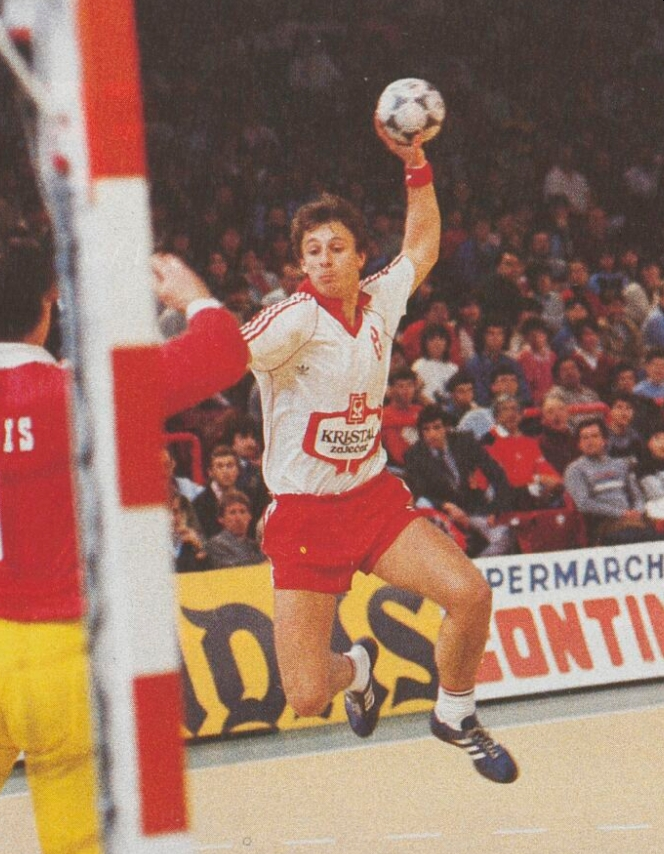

Personal information
- Full name: Igor Butulija
- Nationality: Serbian
- Born: 21 March 1970 (age 56) Belgrade, SR Serbia, SFR Yugoslavia
- Height: 1.89 m (6 ft 2 in)

Sport
- Sport: Handball
- Position: Right back

Youth career
- Years: Team
- –: Crvena zvezda

Senior clubs
- Years: Team
- 1985–1993: Crvena zvezda
- 1993–1994: Atlético Madrid
- 1994–1995: Granollers
- 1995–1996: Crvena zvezda
- 1996–1997: Bidasoa
- 1997: Sporting CP
- 1998: TUSEM Essen
- 1998–1999: Lovćen
- 1999–2000: Crvena zvezda
- 2000–2005: SG Handball West Wien
National team
- Years: Team
- 1990–1992: Yugoslavia
- 1995–2000: FR Yugoslavia

Teams managed
- 2003–2006: SG Handball West Wien
- 2008–2011: Crvena zvezda
Medal record
Men's handball
Representing Yugoslavia
Goodwill Games
| Silver medal – second place | 1990 Seattle | Team |
Mediterranean Games
| Gold medal – first place | 1991 Athens | Team |
Representing FR Yugoslavia
European Championship
| Bronze medal – third place | 1996 Spain | Team |

Igor Butulija (Serbian Cyrillic: Игор Бутулија; born 21 March 1970) is a Serbian former handball player and coach.

== Club career ==
Born in Belgrade, Butulija started out at Crvena zvezda and remained there until 1993. He would later return to the club on two more occasions (in 1995 and 1999). Over the course of his career, Butulija also spent three seasons in Spain with Atlético Madrid (1993–1994), Granollers (1994–1995) and Bidasoa (1996–1997). He lastly played for SG Handball West Wien (from 2000) and later served as player-coach (until 2005). In March 2006, Butulija was replaced as head coach by Wilhelm Doskocil.

== International career ==
At international level, Butulija represented FR Yugoslavia in four major tournaments, winning the bronze medal at the 1996 European Championship. He also participated in the 2000 Summer Olympics, as the team would finish in fourth place.

== Honours ==
Granollers

- EHF Cup: 1994–95

Crvena zvezda

- Handball Championship of FR Yugoslavia: 1995–96
- Handball Cup of FR Yugoslavia: 1995–96

Bidasoa

- EHF Cup Winners' Cup: 1996–97
