= Dragan Škrbić =

Serbian handball player (born 1968)

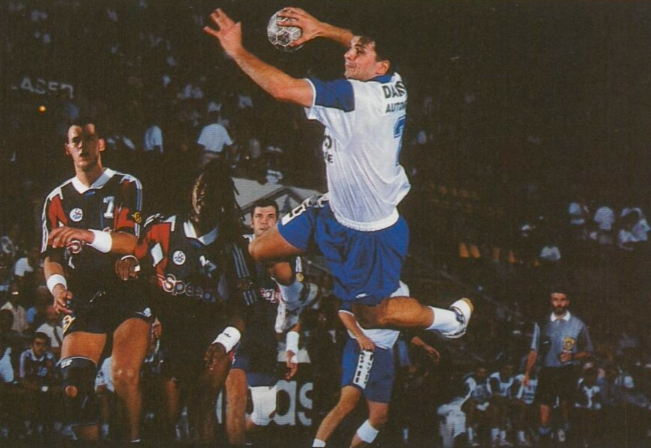

Personal information
- Full name: Dragan Škrbić
- Nationality: Serbian
- Born: 29 September 1968 (age 58) Kula, SR Serbia, Yugoslavia
- Height: 1.90 m (6 ft 3 in)

Sport
- Sport: Handball
- Position: Pivot

Youth career
- Years: Team
- –: Crvenka

Senior clubs
- Years: Team
- –: Jugović
- 1988–1993: Crvena zvezda
- 1993–1994: Atlético Madrid
- 1994–1995: Alzira
- 1995–1997: Ademar León
- 1997–1998: VfL Hameln
- 1998–2000: Celje
- 2000–2002: HSG Nordhorn
- 2002–2007: Barcelona
National team
Years	Team	
1990–1992	Yugoslavia	
1995–2003	FR Yugoslavia	215
Medal record
Men's handball
Representing Yugoslavia
Goodwill Games
Silver medal – second place	1990 Seattle	Team
Mediterranean Games
Gold medal – first place	1991 Athens	Team
Representing FR Yugoslavia
World Championship
Bronze medal – third place	1999 Egypt	Team
Bronze medal – third place	2001 France	Team
European Championship
Bronze medal – third place	1996 Spain	Team

Dragan Škrbić (Serbian Cyrillic: Драган Шкрбић; born 29 September 1968) is a former Serbian handball player. He was named the 2000 IHF World Player of the Year.

He was included in the European Handball Federation Hall of Fame in 2023.

== Club career ==
Over the course of his career that spanned over two decades, Škrbić played for Jugović, Crvena zvezda (1988–1993), Atlético Madrid (1993–1994), Alzira (1994–1995), Ademar León (1995–1997), VfL Hameln (1997–1998), Celje (1998–2000), HSG Nordhorn (2000–2002) and Barcelona (2002–2007). He won the EHF Champions League with Barcelona in the 2004–05 season.

== International career ==
At international level, Škrbić represented FR Yugoslavia in eight major tournaments, winning two bronze medals at the World Championships (1999 and 2001) and one bronze at the European Championships (1996). He also participated in the 2000 Summer Olympics.

== Honours ==
Red Star
- 1 Yugoslav Handball Championship: 1990-91
Yugoslavia National Team
- 1 Bronce medal World Junior Championships: 1989
- 1 Bronze medal European Championships: 1996
- 2 Bronze medal World Championships 1999, 2001
Celje

- Slovenian First League: 1998–99, 1999–2000
- Slovenian Cup: 1998–99, 1999–2000

Barcelona

- Liga ASOBAL: 2002–03, 2005–06
- Copa del Rey: 2003–04, 2006–07
- Supercopa ASOBAL: 2003–04, 2006–07
- EHF Champions League: 2004–05
- EHF Cup: 2002–03

Individual awards

- Best foreign player and best scorer Spanish League (96-97)
- Best player of the season Bundesliga (97-98)
- Best world player of the year (2000)
- Player of the Sidney Olympic Games best team (2000)
- EHF Hall of Fame in 2023.
