= Nenad Vučković (handballer) =

Serbian handball player (born 1980)

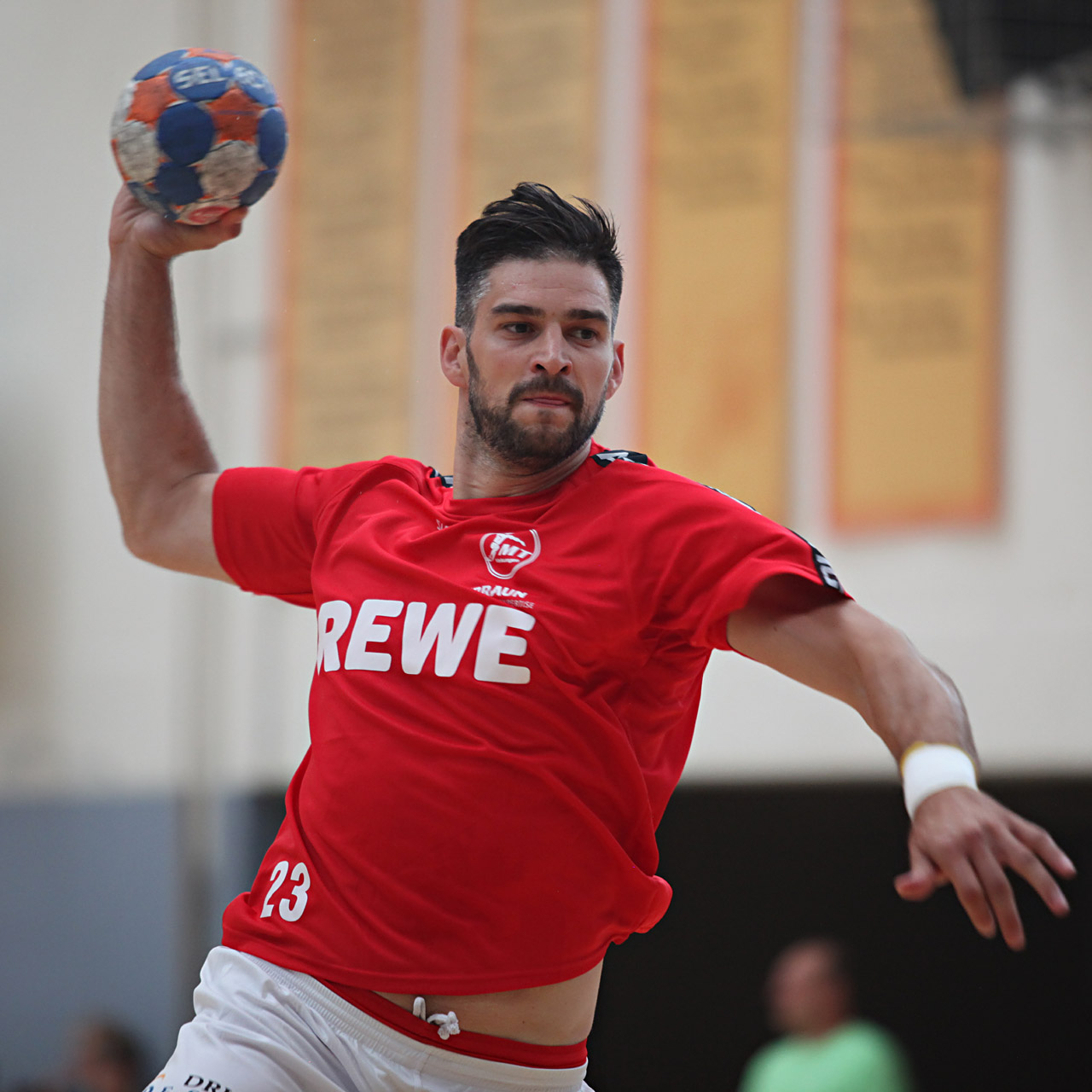
- Vučković in 2015

Personal information
- Full name: Nenad Vučković
- Nationality: Serbian
- Born: 23 August 1980 (age 46) Prokuplje, SR Serbia, SFR Yugoslavia
- Height: 1.92 m (6 ft 4 in)

Sport
- Sport: Handball
- Position: Centre back
- Current club: Dinamo Pančevo
- Number: 23

Senior clubs
- Years: Team
- 1999–2004: Crvena zvezda
- 2004–2007: Chambéry
- 2008–2017: MT Melsungen
- 2017–2018: Vojvodina
- 2018–: Dinamo Pančevo
National team
| Years | Team | Apps | (Gls) |
| 2006–2013 | Serbia | 119 | (229) |
Medal record
Men's handball
Representing Serbia
European Championship
| Silver medal – second place | 2012 Serbia | Team |

Nenad Vučković (Serbian Cyrillic: Ненад Вучковић; born 23 August 1980) is a Serbian handball player for Dinamo Pančevo.

== Club career ==
Over the course of his career that spanned more than two decades, Vučković played for Crvena zvezda (1999–2004), Chambéry (2004–2007), MT Melsungen (2008–2017), Vojvodina (2017–2018), before joining Dinamo Pančevo.

== International career ==
A Serbia international since its inception, Vučković made his major debut for the national team at the 2009 World Men's Handball Championship. He was also a member of the team that won the silver medal at the 2012 European Men's Handball Championship. He competed for Serbia at the 2012 Summer Olympics.

== Honours ==
Crvena zvezda

- Handball League of Serbia and Montenegro: 2003–04
- Handball Cup of Serbia and Montenegro: 2003–04

Vojvodina

- Serbian Handball Super League: 2017–18
