= Nenad Peruničić =

Serbian handball player (born 1971)

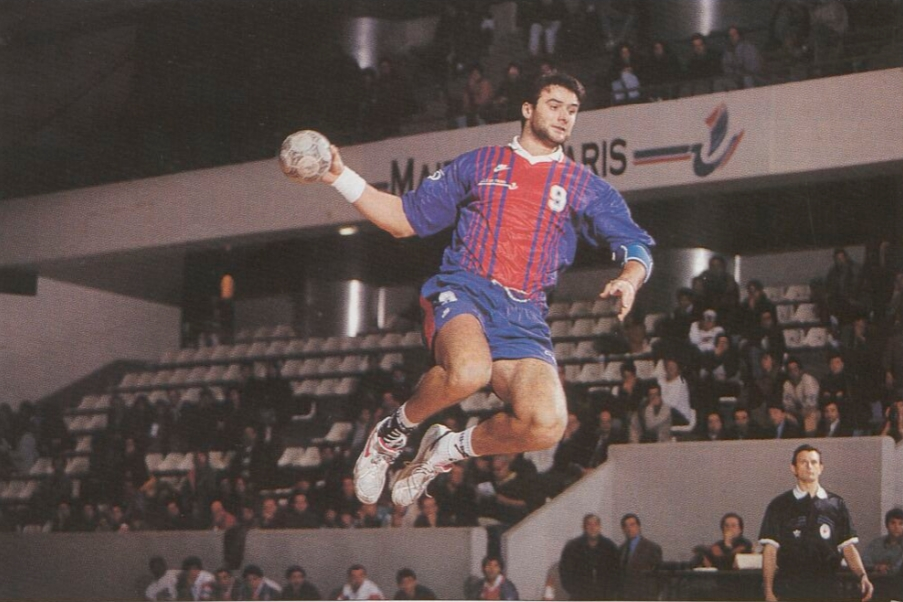

Personal information
- Full name: Nenad Peruničić
- Nationality: Serbian / German
- Born: 1 May 1971 (age 55) Pljevlja, SR Montenegro, SFR Yugoslavia
- Height: 2.03 m (6 ft 8 in)

Sport
- Sport: Handball
- Position: Left back

Youth career
- Years: Team
- –: Rudar Pljevlja

Senior clubs
- Years: Team
- 1988–1990: Jugović
- 1990–1993: Crvena zvezda
- 1993–1994: PSG-Asnières
- 1994–1997: Elgorriaga Bidasoa
- 1997–2001: THW Kiel
- 2001–2004: SC Magdeburg
- 2004–2005: SG Wallau-Massenheim
- 2005: Al Ahli Doha
- 2005–2006: Pick Szeged
- 2006–2007: Barcelona
- 2007: Algeciras
- 2007–2008: Crvena zvezda
- 2008–2009: Budućnost Podgorica
- 2015: Crvena zvezda
National team
- Years: Team
- 1990–1991: Yugoslavia
- 1995–2003: FR Yugoslavia

Teams managed
- 2011–2019: Crvena zvezda
- 2018–2020: Serbia
- 2019: Crvena zvezda
Medal record
Men's handball
Representing Yugoslavia
Goodwill Games
Silver medal – second place	1990 Seattle	Team
Mediterranean Games
Gold medal – first place	1991 Athens	Team
Representing FR Yugoslavia
World Championship
Bronze medal – third place	1999 Egypt	Team
European Championship
Bronze medal – third place	1996 Spain	Team

Nenad Peruničić (Serbian Cyrillic: Ненад Перуничић; born 1 May 1971) is a Serbian handball coach and former player.

== Club career ==
Born in Pljevlja, Peruničić made his senior debut with Jugović in the Yugoslav Championship, before moving to Crvena zvezda in 1990. He spent three seasons with the Belgrade club, most notably losing the championship final to Partizan in 1993. That year, Peruničić was transferred to PSG-Asnières. He would finish the 1993–94 season as the second-highest scorer in the French league.

In 1994, Peruničić moved to Spain and signed with Elgorriaga Bidasoa. He helped the club win the Liga ASOBAL and EHF Champions League in his debut season. Over the next two years, Peruničić added three more trophies to his collection, including the EHF Cup Winners' Cup (1996–97).

Between 1997 and 2001, Peruničić spent four seasons with THW Kiel and won three consecutive doubles (1998, 1999, and 2000). He also helped the club win the EHF Cup in his first year. After leaving Kiel, Peruničić moved to SC Magdeburg, winning his second European title in 2002. He would miss the majority of the 2003–04 season due to shoulder injury.

In the 2004–05 season, Peruničić played for SG Wallau-Massenheim, before going to Qatar in April 2005. He would also play for Pick Szeged (2005–06) and Barcelona (2006–07). After a brief spell at Algeciras, Peruničić returned to Crvena zvezda in November 2007, immediately helping the club win the league title. He subsequently joined Montenegrin side Budućnost Podgorica and helped them win their first championship title in 2009.

In early 2015, Peruničić came out of retirement to help Crvena zvezda stave-off relegation from the Super League.

== International career ==
At international level, Peruničić represented FR Yugoslavia in six major tournaments, winning two bronze medals (1996 European Championship and 1999 World Championship). He also participated in the 2000 Summer Olympics.

== Coaching career ==
In November 2011, Peruničić replaced Igor Butulija as head coach of Crvena zvezda. He spent seven years in charge, before resigning from his position in February 2019.

In September 2018, Peruničić was appointed as head coach for Serbia. He coached the team at two major tournaments.

== Personal life ==
Peruničić is the younger brother of fellow handball player Predrag Peruničić.

In 2002, Peruničić obtained German citizenship.

== Honours ==
=== Player ===
Elgorriaga Bidasoa

- Liga ASOBAL: 1994–95
- Copa del Rey: 1995–96
- Supercopa ASOBAL: 1995–96
- EHF Champions League: 1994–95
- EHF Cup Winners' Cup: 1996–97

THW Kiel

- Handball-Bundesliga: 1997–98, 1998–99, 1999–2000
- DHB-Pokal: 1997–98, 1998–99, 1999–2000
- DHB-Supercup: 1998
- EHF Cup: 1997–98

SC Magdeburg

- DHB-Supercup: 2001
- EHF Champions League: 2001–02
- EHF Supercup: 2001, 2002

Pick Szeged

- Magyar Kupa: 2005–06

Barcelona

- Copa del Rey: 2006–07
- Supercopa ASOBAL: 2006–07

Crvena zvezda

- Serbian Handball Super League: 2007–08

Budućnost Podgorica

- Montenegrin Men's Handball First League: 2008–09

=== Coach ===
Crvena zvezda

- Serbian Handball Cup: 2016–17
- Serbian Handball Super Cup: 2017
