= Nikola Manojlović =

Nikola Manojlović may refer to:

- Nikola Manojlović (handballer)
- Nikola Manojlović (basketball)
