= Draško Nenadić =

Serbian handball player (born 1990)

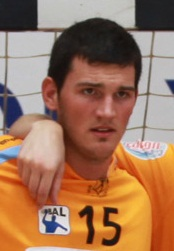

Personal information
- Nationality: Serbian
- Born: 15 February 1990 (age 36) Belgrade, SR Serbia, Yugoslavia
- Height: 2.03 m (6 ft 8 in)

Sport
- Sport: Handball
- Position: Left back
- Current club: BM Huesca
- Number: 5

Youth career
- Years: Team
- –: RK Partizan

Senior clubs
- Years: Team
- 2007–2010: RK Crvena zvezda
- 2010–2012: BM Granollers
- 2012–2013: BM Guadalajara
- 2013–2015: SG Flensburg-Handewitt
- 2015–2016: HSV Hamburg
- 2017: Füchse Berlin
- 2018: Bjerringbro-Silkeborg
- 2018–2019: RK Celje
- 2019–2020: BM Granollers
- 2020–2021: HSC 2000 Coburg
- 2021–2024: RK Crvena zvezda
- 2025–: BM Huesca
National team
Years	Team	Apps	(Gls)
2012–	Serbia	32	(32)

Draško Nenadić (born 15 February 1990) is a Serbian handball player who plays for BM Huesca.

His brother Petar Nenadić is also a handball player, and was part of the national team.
