= Zelenović =

Zelenović (Serbian: Зеленовић) is a Serbian surname, derived from the word zeleno, meaning "green". Notable people with the surname include:

- Dragutin Zelenović (born 1928), Yugoslav and Serbian politician
- Nemanja Zelenović (born 1990), Serbian handballer
- Nebojša Zelenović (born 1975), Serbian politician
