= Vladimir Cupara =

Serbian handball player (born 1994)

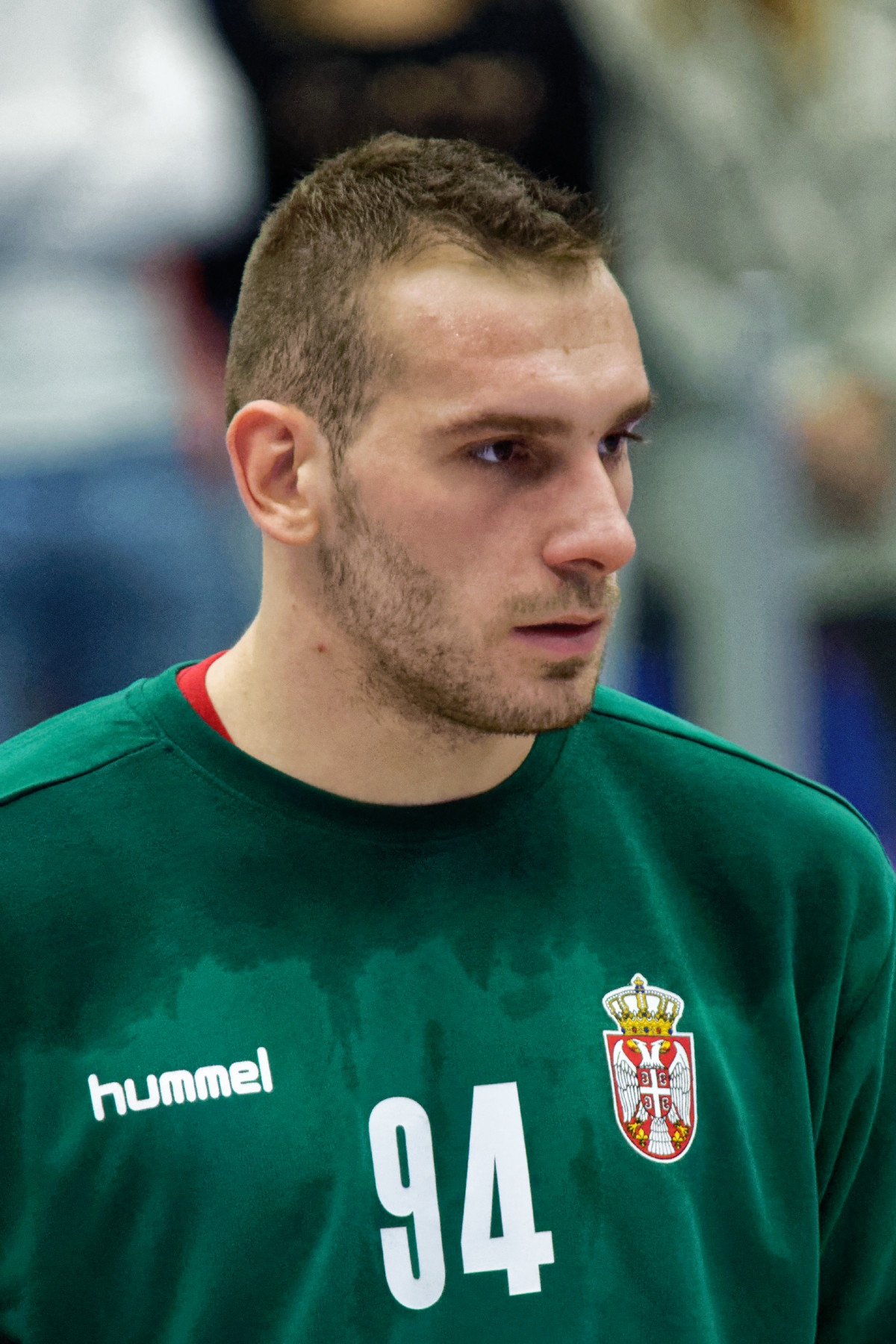

Personal information
- Nationality: Serbian
- Born: 19 February 1994 (age 32) Belgrade, Serbia, FR Yugoslavia
- Height: 1.98 m (6 ft 6 in)

Sport
- Sport: Handball
- Position: Goalkeeper
- Current club: HBW Balingen-Weilstetten

Senior clubs
- Years: Team
- 2012–2015: Crvena zvezda
- 2015–2018: Ademar León
- 2018–2019: Vive Kielce
- 2019–2023: Veszprém
- 2023–2026: Dinamo București
- 2026–present: HBW Balingen-Weilstetten
National team
Years	Team	Apps	(Gls)
2016–present	Serbia	79	(5)
- Updated on 15 January 2026

Vladimir Cupara (born 19 February 1994) is a Serbian handball player for HBW Balingen-Weilstetten of the German Bundesliga. He also represents the Serbian national team.

He participated at the 2018 European Men's Handball Championship.

== Individual awards ==
- SEHA League All-Star Team Best Goalkeeper: 2020-21
