= Pabellón Municipal Rafael Florido =

Arena in Almería, Spain

Coordinates: 36.8404°N 2.4471°W

Pabellón Municipal Rafael Florido is an arena in Almería, Spain. It is primarily used for team handball and is the home arena of BM Ciudad de Almería. The arena holds 2,000 spectators.
