= Nemanja Zelenović =

Serbian handball player (born 1990)

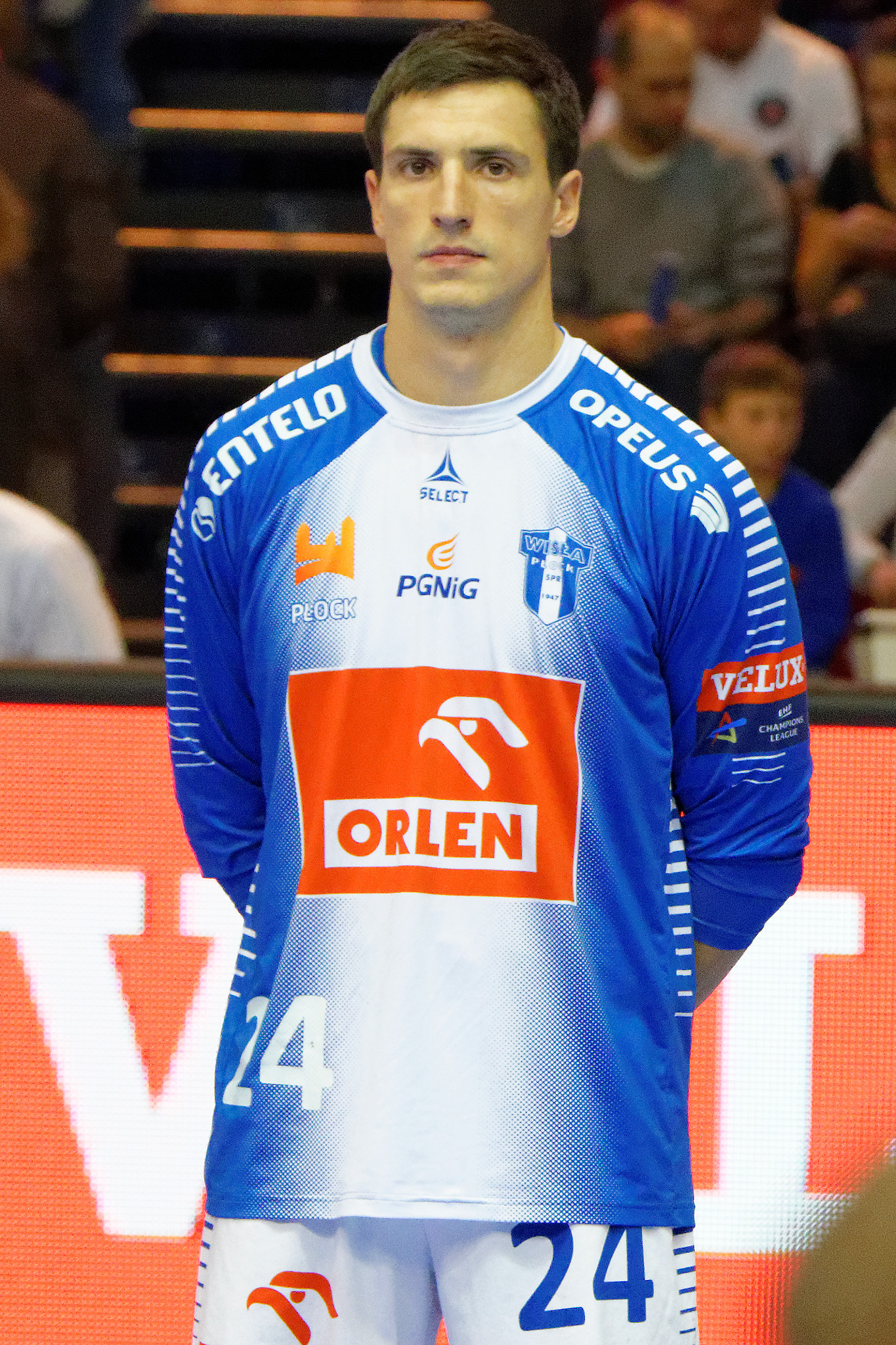
- Zelenović in 2015

Personal information
- Full name: Nemanja Zelenović
- Nationality: Serbian
- Born: 27 February 1990 (age 36) Knin, SR Croatia, SFR Yugoslavia
- Height: 1.94 m (6 ft 4 in)

Sport
- Sport: Handball
- Position: Right back
- Current club: HSG Wetzlar
- Number: 42

Youth career
- Years: Team
- –: RK Crvena zvezda

Senior clubs
- Years: Team
- 2007–2011: RK Crvena zvezda
- 2011–2014: RK Celje
- 2014–2015: Wisła Płock
- 2015–2018: SC Magdeburg
- 2018–2022: Frisch Auf Göppingen
- 2022–2023: VfL Gummersbach
- 2023–: HSG Wetzlar
National team
- Years: Team
- 2012–: Serbia

Nemanja Zelenović (Serbian Cyrillic: Немања Зеленовић; born 27 February 1990) is a Serbian handball player for HSG Wetzlar and the Serbia national team.

== Club career ==
After coming through the youth categories of Crvena zvezda, Zelenović made his senior debut in the 2007–08 season, as the club won the championship title. He moved abroad and signed with Slovenian side Celje in 2011.

== International career ==
At international level, Zelenović represented Serbia in two World Championships (2013 and 2019) and four European Championships (2014, 2016, 2018 and 2020).

== Honours ==
Crvena zvezda

- Serbian Handball Super League: 2007–08

Celje

- Slovenian First League: 2013–14
- Slovenian Cup: 2011–12, 2012–13, 2013–14

SC Magdeburg

- DHB-Pokal: 2015–16
