= Algeciras BM =

Spanish handball club

Algeciras
- Full name: Algeciras Balonmano
- Founded: 1974
- Dissolved: 2008
- Arena: Ciudad de Algeciras, Algeciras, Andalusia, Spain
- Capacity: 2,300
- 2007–08: Liga ASOBAL, 15th
Home	Away

Algeciras Balonmano was a Spanish handball team based in Algeciras, Andalusia. The last season, (2007–08) the team played in Liga ASOBAL.

== History ==
Algeciras Balonmano was founded in 1966.

- Note:: After of being relegated to División de Honor B at end of 2007-08 season, the club disappears due to the enormous debts.

== Statistics 2007/08 ==
Liga ASOBAL	Position	Pts	P	W	D	L	F	A
Algeciras BM	15	16	30	6	4	20	869	1023

- Goals:
  - Valero Rivera - 154 goals
  - Ricard Reig - 136 goals
  - Božidar Nadoveza - 69 goals
- Catches:
  - Kostantinos Tsilimparis - 214 catches 27%
  - Slaviša Stojinović - 100 catches 28%

== Notable players ==
- (Spain) Valero Rivera Folch
- (Serbia) Nedeljko Jovanović
- (Serbia) Petar Nenadić
- (Serbia) Nenad Peruničić
- (North Macedonia) Borko Ristovski

== Stadium information ==
- Name: - Pabellón Ciudad de Algeciras
- City: - Algeciras
- Capacity: - 2,300 people
- Address: - C/ Susana Marcos, s/n
