= RK Crvena zvezda =

Serbian handball club

- Full name: Rukometni klub Crvena zvezda
- Nickname: Crveno-beli (The Red-Whites)
- Founded: 1948
- Arena: CCS Šumice
- Capacity: 2,000
- President: Dragan Škrbić
- Head coach: Žikica Milosavljević
- League: Arkus Liga
- Club colours
Home	Away

RK Crvena zvezda (Serbian Cyrillic: РК Црвена звезда) is a Serbian handball club based in Belgrade. They compete in the Serbian Handball Super League.

== History ==
Founded in 1948, the club made its Yugoslav Championship debut in 1954. They subsequently won back-to-back championships in 1955 and 1956.

In 1995–96, the club had its most successful season to date, winning the domestic double (league and cup) and reaching the Cup Winners' Cup semi-finals.

== Crest and colours ==
=== Kits ===
HOME
1992–93	2021–22	2022–23

AWAY

2021–22

== Management ==
Position	Name
President	(Serbia) Dragan Škrbić
Vice President	(Serbia) Andrija Senić
Member Of The Board	(Serbia) Aleksandar Pupović
Member Of The Board	(Serbia) Alen Bojinović
Member Of The Board	(Serbia) Mile Samardžić
Sport Director	(Serbia) Ognjen Kajganić

== Team ==
=== Current squad ===
Squad for the 2025–26 season

RK Crvena Zvezda

Goalkeepers

- 1 (Serbia) Stefan Ćorović
- 12 (Serbia) Luka Petrović
- 16 (Serbia) Nemanja Marjanović

Left Wingers

- 4 (Serbia) Boris Jovanović
- 19 (Serbia) Viktor Matičić
- 15 (Serbia) Luka Medenica

Right Wingers

- 5 (Serbia) Andrej Karlović
- 22 (Serbia) Jovan Mirković

Line Players

- 8 (Serbia) Dušan Andrejević
- 9 (Serbia) Nikola Vidojević
- 88 (Serbia) Uroš Nikolić

Central Backs

- 14 (Serbia) Marko Nađ
- 25 (Serbia) Miloš Pavlović
- 30 (Serbia) Uroš Stanić

Left Backs

- 7 (Serbia) Aleksa Stojanović
- 11 (Serbia) Uroš Ignja
- 13 (Serbia) Andrej Petrić
- 23 (Serbia) Nemanja Obradović

Right Backs

- 3 (Serbia) Aleksa Bukvić
- 91 (Egypt) Hassan Yusuf
- 99 (Serbia) Nikola Ivanović

=== Transfers ===
Transfers for the 2026–27 season

Joining

- (Serbia) Stefan Stojinović (RB) from (Serbia) RK Metaloplastika
- (Serbia) Vanja Damjanović (GK) from (Serbia) RK Metaloplastika
- (Serbia) Momčilo Simić (LP) from (Serbia) RK Metaloplastika
- (Serbia) Filip Milošević (CB) from (Serbia) RK Lavovi Beograd
- (Serbia) Uroš Simić (LW) from (Serbia) RK Vranje

Leaving

- (Serbia) Nemanja Marjanović (GK) to (Israel) Hapoel Arad

=== Transfer History ===
Transfers for the 2025–26 season

Joining

- (Serbia) Stefan Ćorović (GK) from (Serbia) RK Proleter Zrenjanin
- (Serbia) Nikola Vidojević (LP) from (Serbia) RK Jugović
- (Serbia) Aleksa Bukvić (RB) from (Serbia) RK Vranje
- (Serbia) Boris Jovanović (LW) from (Serbia) RK Obilić
- (Serbia) Uroš Stanić (LB) from (Serbia) RK Kolubara

Leaving

- (Serbia) Mihailo Šljukić (LB) to (Italy) Pallamano Conversano
- (Serbia) Nikola Jezdimirović (LB) to (Italy) Cassano Magnago HC
- (Serbia) Sava Radovanović (CB) to (Serbia) RK Šamot
- (Serbia) Aleksa Skuban (LW) to (Serbia) RK Jugović
- (Serbia) Nemanja Momčilović (RB) to (Serbia) RK Dubočica 54
- (Serbia) Aleksa Bogunović (GK) to (Serbia) RK Vranje

Transfers for the 2022–23 season

Joining

- (Serbia) (Montenegro) Branko Kankaraš (LP) from (Israel) Maccabi Rishon LeZion
- (Israel) Rotem Segal (RB) from (Israel) Maccabi Rishon LeZion
- (Serbia) Petar Panić (LB) from (Serbia) RK Rudar Kostolac
- (Serbia) Nikola Perić (GK) from (Serbia) RK Dinamo Pančevo
- (Serbia) Miloš Bujišić (RB)
- (Tunisia) Ramzi Majdoub (RW)
- (Serbia) Uroš Kolundžić (RW)

Leaving

- (Serbia) (Montenegro) Branko Kankaraš (LP) to (Serbia) RK Metaloplastika
- (Serbia) Marko Knežević (CB) to (Serbia) RK Jugović

== Honours and achievements ==
National Championships – 9

- Yugoslav League
  - Winners (2): 1954–55, 1955–56
  - Runners-up (3): 1957–58, 1982–83, 1985–86
  - Third place (3): 1959–60, 1979–80, 1990–91
- Yugoslav Handball Winter Championship
  - Runners-up (1): 1965
- Serbia and Montenegro League
  - Winners (5): 1995–96, 1996–97, 1997–98, 2003–04, 2005–06
  - Runners-up (2): 1992–93, 1994–95
  - Third place (3): 1991–92, 1993–94, 2002–03
- Serbian League
  - Winners (2): 2006–07, 2007–08
  - Runners-up (2): 2009–10, 2010–11
  - Third place (2): 2008–09, 2016–17

National Cups – 5

- Yugoslav Cup
  - Winners (1): 1955–56
  - Runners-up (4): 1974–75, 1983–84, 1990–91, 1991–92
- Serbia and Montenegro Cup
  - Winners (3): 1994–95, 1995–96, 2003–04
  - Runners-up (2): 1993–94, 1999–2000
- Serbian Cup
  - Winners (1): 2016–17
  - Runners-up (3): 2009–10, 2010–11, 2013–14

National Super Cup – 1

- Serbian Super Cup
  - Winners (1): 2017

Other Tournaments – 4

- Doboj Tournament
  - Winners (2): 1974, 1989
- TV Tournament of Champions
  - Winners (2): 1992, 1995

International

- EHF Cup Winners' Cup
  - Semi-finalists (1): 1995–96

== Notable players ==
- (Socialist Federal Republic of Yugoslavia) Andrija Banjanin
- (Socialist Federal Republic of Yugoslavia) Jovica Cvetković
- (Socialist Federal Republic of Yugoslavia) Bogdan Cvijetić
- (Socialist Federal Republic of Yugoslavia) Svetomir Ćeramilac
- (Socialist Federal Republic of Yugoslavia) Petar Fajfrić
- (Socialist Federal Republic of Yugoslavia) Petrit Fejzula
- (Socialist Federal Republic of Yugoslavia) Milan Kalina
- (Socialist Federal Republic of Yugoslavia) Veroljub Kosovac
- (Socialist Federal Republic of Yugoslavia) Mladen Laković
- (Socialist Federal Republic of Yugoslavia) Rajko Lau
- (Socialist Federal Republic of Yugoslavia) Milan Lazarević
- (Socialist Federal Republic of Yugoslavia) Velibor Nenadić
- (Socialist Federal Republic of Yugoslavia) Branislav Pokrajac
- (Socialist Federal Republic of Yugoslavia) Branko Štrbac
- (Serbia and Montenegro) Igor Butulija
- (Serbia and Montenegro) Nikola Eklemović
- (Serbia and Montenegro) Petar Kapisoda
- (Serbia and Montenegro) Aleksandar Knežević
- (Serbia and Montenegro) Blažo Lisičić
- (Serbia and Montenegro) Nenad Maksić
- (Serbia and Montenegro) Nikola Manojlović
- (Serbia and Montenegro) Vladan Matić
- (Serbia and Montenegro) Žikica Milosavljević
- (Serbia and Montenegro) Ivan Nikčević
- (Serbia and Montenegro) Ratko Nikolić
- (Serbia and Montenegro) Dejan Perić
- (Serbia and Montenegro) Nenad Peruničić
- (Serbia and Montenegro) Predrag Peruničić
- (Serbia and Montenegro) Vladimir Petrić
- (Serbia and Montenegro) Nenad Puljezević
- (Serbia and Montenegro) Darko Stanić
- (Serbia and Montenegro) Goran Stojanović
- (Serbia and Montenegro) Rastko Stojković
- (Serbia and Montenegro) Danijel Šarić
- (Serbia and Montenegro) Dragan Škrbić
- (Serbia and Montenegro) Nenad Vučković
- (Serbia) Vladimir Cupara
- (Serbia) Tibor Ivanišević
- (Serbia) Draško Nenadić
- (Serbia) Petar Nenadić
- (Serbia) Miljan Pušica
- (Serbia) Nemanja Zelenović

== Notable coaches ==
- (Socialist Federal Republic of Yugoslavia) Nikola Vučinić
- (Socialist Federal Republic of Yugoslavia) Zoran Živković
- (Serbia and Montenegro) Ljubomir Obradović
- (Serbia and Montenegro) Jovica Cvetković
- (Serbia and Montenegro) Zlatan Arnautović
- (Serbia and Montenegro) Dragan Đukić
- (Serbia) Vuk Roganović
- (Serbia) Nenad Kraljevski
- (Serbia) Igor Butulija
- (Serbia) Nenad Peruničić
