= BM Ciudad de Almería =

Spanish handball club

Keymare Almería
- Full name: Balonmano Ciudad de Almería
- Founded: 1991
- Dissolved: 2009
- Ground: Mpal. Rafael Florido, Almería, Andalusia, Spain
- Capacity: 2,000
- 2008–09: Liga ASOBAL, 16th
Home colours	Away colours

Balonmano Ciudad de Almería were a handball club based in Almería, Andalusia.

== History ==
Balonmano Ciudad de Almería was founded in 1991. In the 2001–02 season they were promoted to the Liga ASOBAL for the first time. They were dissolved in 2009 due to the economic troubles.

== Last squad (2008–09) ==
- 1 (Spain) Hector Tomás
- 2 (France) Guillaume Roche
- 3 (Spain) (Morocco) Ismael Safiani
- 4 (Spain) Aaron Moya
- 5 (Spain) Antonio Romera
- 8 (Spain) José Marcos
- 9 (Spain) (Russia) Alexandre Tioumentsev
- 11 (Spain) Manuel Rodríguez
- 16 (Spain) Pablo Alamo
- 17 (Spain) Alejandro Criado
- 18 (Spain) Jesús López
- 19 (Spain) Eloy Félez
- 20 (Spain) Javier Bertos
- 22 (Spain) Cristo López
- 23 (Spain) Eloy Gonzalez
- 25 (Spain) Juan Antonio
- 27 (Spain) Juan Jose Ruesga
- 66 (Spain) Ricardo Amérigo

== Statistics 2008/09 ==
Liga ASOBAL	Position	Pts	P	W	D	L	F	A
BM Ciudad de Almería	16th	5	30	2	1	27	728	966

- Goals:
  - Alexandre Tioumentsev - 103 goals
  - Javier Bertos - 91 goals
  - Juan Antonio Vázquez - 90 goals
- Catches:
  - Hector Marcos Tomás - 242 catches of 872 shots - 0.27 avg.
  - Ricardo Amérigo - 70 catches of 357 shots - 0.19 avg.

== Stadium information ==
- Name: - Mpal. Rafael Florido
- City: - Almería
- Capacity: - 2,000 people
- Address: - Avda. de Mediterráneo, 228
