= Serbia men's national handball team =

Serbia

Information
- Nickname: Orlovi (The Eagles)
- Association: Handball Federation of Serbia
- Coach: Raúl González
- Assistant coach: Nemanja Pribak; Mihailo Radosavljević

Colours
1st	2nd

Results

Summer Olympics
- Appearances: 2 (First in 2000)
- Best result: 4th (2000)

World Championship
- Appearances: 10 (First in 1997)
- Best result: (bronze) 3rd (1999, 2001)

European Championship
- Appearances: 14 (First in 1996)
- Best result: (silver) 2nd (2012)
- Last updated on Unknown.

Serbia men's national handball team
Medal record

Representing (Federal Republic of Yugoslavia) Serbia and Montenegro Serbia

World Championship
Bronze medal – third place	1999 Egypt	
Bronze medal – third place	2001 France	

European Championship
Silver medal – second place	2012 Serbia	
Bronze medal – third place	1996 Spain	

Mediterranean Games
Gold medal – first place	2009 Pescara	Team
Bronze medal – third place	2022 Oran	Team

Summer Universiade
Silver medal – second place	2015 Gwangju	Team

The Serbia men's national handball team represents Serbia in international men's handball competitions. It is governed by the Serbian Handball Federation.

In 1999, the Olympic Committee of Yugoslavia declared it the country's male team of the year.

== History ==
=== 2012 European Championship ===
The 2012 European Men's Handball Championship was the tenth edition of the tournament and was held in Serbia from 15–29 January 2012 in the cities of Belgrade, Niš, Novi Sad and Vršac.

Playing in front of their home crowd, the hosts were pitted in Group A against Denmark, Poland and Slovakia. They finished first in the group following victories against Denmark and Poland.

In the main round the team faced Germany, Sweden and Macedonia. Serbia advanced again by defeating two of their three opponents and defeated Croatia in the semifinal 26–22. They faced Denmark in the final, after having already beaten them in the group stage. However, Denmark exacted upon revenge to emerge as champions.

== Honours ==
Competition	1st place, gold medalist(s)	2nd place, silver medalist(s)	3rd place, bronze medalist(s)	Total
Olympic Games	0	0	0	0
World Championship	0	0	2	2
European Championship	0	1	1	2
Total	0	1	3	4

== Competitive record ==
The Serbian Handball Federation is deemed the direct successor to Yugoslavia and Serbia and Montenegro by EHF.

Champions Runners-up Third place Fourth place

=== Olympic Games ===
Games	Round	Position	Pld	W	D	L	GF	GA	GD
1936 to 1988	part of Yugoslavia								
(Spain) 1992	qualified and later suspended								
(United States) 1996	Part of FR Yugoslavia did not qualify								
(Australia) 2000	Fourth place	4th of 12	8	4	0	4	204	203	+1
(Greece) 2004	did not qualify								
(China) 2008	did not qualify Serbia								
(United Kingdom) 2012	Group stage	9th of 12	5	1	0	4	120	131	−11
(Brazil) 2016	did not qualify								
(Japan) 2020	did not qualify								
(France) 2024	did not qualify								
(United States) 2028	Future events								
(Australia) 2032	Future events								
Total	2/8	–	13	5	0	8	324	334	−10

=== World Championship ===
Year	Round	Position	GP	W	D	L	GS	GA
1938 to 1990	part of Yugoslavia							
(Sweden) 1993	qualified and later suspended							
(Iceland) 1995	Part of FR Yugoslavia suspended from qualification tournament							
(Japan) 1997	Round of 16	9	6	4	0	2	162	148
(Egypt) 1999	Third place	3	9	6	1	2	257	211
(France) 2001	Third place	3	9	7	0	2	254	182
(Portugal) 2003	7th/8th place	8	9	5	1	3	263	228
(Tunisia) 2005	5th/6th place	5	9	5	2	2	253	221
(Germany) 2007	did not qualify Serbia							
(Croatia) 2009	7th/8th place	8	9	4	1	4	280	281
(Sweden) 2011	9th/10th place	10	9	3	1	5	246	251
(Spain) 2013	Round of 16	10	6	3	0	3	170	159
(Qatar) 2015	did not qualify							
(France) 2017	did not qualify							
(Denmark) (Germany) 2019	Presidents Cup	18	7	2	1	4	187	203
(Egypt) 2021	did not qualify							
(Poland) (Sweden) 2023	Main round	11	6	4	0	2	191	168
(Croatia) / (Denmark) / (Norway) 2025	did not qualify							
(Germany) 2027	qualified							
(France) / (Germany) 2029	Future events							
(Denmark) / (Iceland) / (Norway) 2031	Future events							
Total	11/18	–	79	43	7	29	2263	2052

=== European Championship ===
Year	Round	Position	GP	W	D	L	GS	GA
(Portugal) 1994	Part of FR Yugoslavia suspended from qualification tournament							
(Spain) 1996	Third place	3	7	5	1	1	166	162
(Italy) 1998	5th/6th place	5	6	4	0	2	157	145
(Croatia) 2000	did not qualify							
(Sweden) 2002	9th/10th place	10	7	2	1	4	185	192
(Slovenia) 2004	7th/8th place	8	7	3	1	3	206	199
(Switzerland) 2006	Main round	9	6	2	0	4	166	181
(Norway) 2008	did not qualify Serbia							
(Austria) 2010	Preliminary round	13	3	0	1	2	83	94
(Serbia) 2012	Runner-up	2	8	4	2	2	176	168
(Denmark) 2014	Preliminary round	13	3	1	0	2	73	77
(Poland) 2016	Preliminary round	15	3	0	1	2	81	92
(Croatia) 2018	Main round	12	6	1	0	5	160	191
(Austria) (Norway) (Sweden) 2020	Preliminary round	20	3	0	0	3	72	81
(Hungary) (Slovakia) 2022	Preliminary round	14	3	1	0	2	76	75
(Germany) 2024	Preliminary round	19	3	0	1	2	83	85
(Denmark) (Sweden) (Norway) 2026	Preliminary round	19	3	1	0	2	82	82
(Spain) (Portugal) (Switzerland) 2028	Future event							
(Czech Republic) (Denmark) (Poland) 2030	Future event							
(France) (Germany) 2032	Future event							
Total	14/20	–	68	24	8	36	1766	1824

* Colored background indicates that medal was won on the tournament.
** Red border color indicates that tournament was held on home soil.

=== Mediterranean Games ===
- 1993 – Suspended

Part of FR Yugoslavia

- 1997 – 5th
- 2001 – 5th
- 2005 – 4th

As Serbia

- 2009 – Champions
- 2013 – 6th
- 2018 – 8th
- 2022 – 3rd

== Team ==
=== Current squad ===
Squad for the 2026 European Men's Handball Championship

Head coach: Raúl González

No.	Pos.	Name	Date of birth (age)	Height	App.	Goals	Club
1	GK	Vladimir Cupara	19 February 1994 (age 32)	1.99 m	79	5	(Romania) Dinamo București
3	RW	Vukašin Vorkapić	1 October 1997 (age 29)	1.87 m	34	69	(Serbia) RK Vojvodina
4	P	Marko Jevtić	17 October 2001 (age 25)	1.86 m	5	21	(Spain) CD Bidasoa
13	LB	Uroš Borzaš	28 July 1999 (age 27)	1.88 m	38	66	(North Macedonia) RK Alkaloid
15	RW	Uroš Kojadinović	26 September 2000 (age 26)	1.86 m	23	67	(France) Fenix Toulouse Handball
16	GK	Andrej Trnavac	13 December 1998 (age 27)	1.87 m	8	0	(Serbia) RK Partizan
19	LW	Nemanja Ilić	11 May 1990 (age 36)	1.76 m	140	397	(France) Fenix Toulouse Handball
21	LW	Vanja Ilić	25 February 1993 (age 33)	1.85 m	97	245	(France) C' Chartres Métropole Handball
22	P	Ivan Mićić	22 September 2000 (age 26)	1.90 m	5	13	(Serbia) RK Partizan
23	CB	Aljoša Damjanović	29 May 2005 (age 21)	1.87 m	0	0	(Serbia) RK Metaloplastika
24	CB	Lazar Kukić	12 December 1995 (age 30)	1.88 m	61	147	(Hungary) SC Pick Szeged
28	RB	Uroš Mitrović	13 September 2004 (age 22)	1.98 m	2	5	(North Macedonia) RK Vardar
29	LB	Marko Tasić	2 February 2003 (age 23)	1.99 m	2	1	(Serbia) Dinamo Pančevo
35	CB	Veljko Popović	18 February 2000 (age 26)	1.90 m	2	6	(Serbia) RK Partizan
40	CB	Stefan Dodić	13 March 2003 (age 23)	1.94 m	10	17	(Serbia) RK Vojvodina
45	RW	Darko Đukić	11 December 1994 (age 31)	1.91 m	58	157	(North Macedonia) GRK Ohrid
46	P	Dragan Pechmalbec	5 January 1996 (age 30)	1.94 m	35	92	(Hungary) Veszprém KC
93	P	Mijajlo Marsenić	9 March 1993 (age 33)	2.02 m	130	298	(Germany) Füchse Berlin
96	GK	Dejan Milosavljev	16 March 1996 (age 30)	1.96 m	74	3	(Germany) Füchse Berlin

=== Individual records ===
- **Bold** denotes players still playing international handball.

==== Most capped players ====
#	Player	Matches	Position	Years
1	Dragan Škrbić	215	P	1990–2003
2	Dejan Perić	207	GK	1990–2010
3	Nedeljko Jovanović	154	CB	1990–2003
4	Alem Toskić	147	P	2004–2014
5	Nenad Peruničić	141	OB	1990–2003
6	Nemanja Ilić	140	LW	2012–2026
7	Ivan Nikčević	138	W	2006–2016
8	Momir Ilić	128	OB	2004–2015
8	Zoran Đorđić	128	GK	1995–2001
10	Nenad Maksić	127	OB	1998–2006

==== Top scorers ====
#	Player	Goals	Average	Position	Years
1	Dragan Škrbić	591+	2.75	P	1990–2003
2	Ivan Nikčević	506	3.67	W	2006–2016
3	Momir Ilić	463	3.62	OB	2004–2015
4	Marko Vujin	438	4.09	OB	2003–present
5	Nedeljko Jovanović	433	2.81	CB	1990–2003
6	Nemanja Ilić	397	2.86	LW	2012–2026
7	Mladen Bojinović	322	3.16	OB	2001–2011
8	Nenad Peruničić	310+	2.20+	OB	1990–2003
9	Žarko Šešum	310	2.50	OB	2006–2021
10	Ivan Lapčević	307	2.65	OB	1997–2010
