= Serbia and Montenegro Handball Cup =

Annual national handball competition

- Founded: 1992
- Country: Serbia and Montenegro
- Confederation: EHF
- Most titles: Partizan (4)
- International cup: EHF Cup Winners' Cup

Serbia and Montenegro Handball Cup was the national handball cup competition in Serbia and Montenegro.

== Winners ==
Season	Winner
1992–93	Partizan
1993–94	Partizan
1994–95	Crvena zvezda
1995–96	Crvena zvezda
1996–97	Železničar Niš
1997–98	Partizan
1998–99	Železničar Niš
1999–2000	Sintelon
2000–01	Partizan
2001–02	Lovćen
2002–03	Lovćen
2003–04	Crvena zvezda
2004–05	Vojvodina
2005–06	Vojvodina

== Results by teams ==
Teams	Titles	Seasons
Partizan	4	1992–93, 1993–94, 1997–98, 2000–01
Crvena zvezda	3	1994–95, 1995–96, 2003–04
Lovćen	2	2001–02, 2002–03
Vojvodina	2	2004–05, 2005–06
Železničar Niš	2	1996–97, 1998–99
Sintelon	1	1999–2000

== See also ==
- Yugoslav Handball Cup
- Serbian Handball Cup
