= Serbia and Montenegro men's national handball team =

Serbia and Montenegro

Information
- Association: Serbia and Montenegro Handball Federation

Colours
1st	2nd

Results

Summer Olympics
- Appearances: 1 (First in 2000)
- Best result: 4th (2000)

World Championship
- Appearances: 5 (First in 1997)
- Best result: (bronze) 3rd(1999, 2001)

European Championship
- Appearances: 5 (First in 1996)
- Best result: (bronze) 3rd (1996)
- Last updated on Unknown.

The Serbia and Montenegro national handball team was a handball team that represented the state union of Serbia and Montenegro in the international matches and played from the country's independence ever since the early 1990s up until Montenegro's independence in 2006. The team was controlled by the Serbia and Montenegro Handball Federation. It was succeeded by the Serbia national handball team and Montenegro national handball team.

== Competitions ==
Competition	1st place, gold medalist(s)	2nd place, silver medalist(s)	3rd place, bronze medalist(s)	Total
Olympic Games	0	0	0	0
World Championship	0	0	2	2
European Championship	0	0	1	1
Total	0	0	3	3

=== Olympic Games ===
Games	Round	Position	Pld	W	D	L	GF	GA	GD
1936 to 1988	Part of Yugoslavia								
(Spain) 1992	Qualified and later suspended								
(United States) 1996	Did not qualify								
(Australia) 2000	Fourth place	4th of 12	8	4	0	4	204	203	+1
(Greece) 2004	Did not qualify								

=== World Championship ===
Year	Round	Position	GP	W	D	L	GS	GA
1938 to 1990	Part of Yugoslavia							
(Sweden) 1993	Qualified and later suspended							
(Iceland) 1995	Suspended from qualification tournament							
(Japan) 1997	Round of 16	9	6	4	0	2	162	148
(Egypt) 1999	Third place	3	9	6	1	2	257	211
(France) 2001	Third place	3	9	7	0	2	254	182
(Portugal) 2003	7th/8th place	8	9	5	1	3	263	228
(Tunisia) 2005	5th/6th place	5	9	5	2	2	253	221

=== European Championship ===
Year	Round	Position	GP	W	D	L	GS	GA
(Portugal) 1994	Suspended from qualification tournament							
(Spain) 1996	Third place	3	7	5	1	1	166	162
(Italy) 1998	5th/6th Place	5	6	4	0	2	157	145
(Croatia) 2000	Did not qualify							
(Sweden) 2002	9th/10th Place	10	7	2	1	4	185	192
(Slovenia) 2004	7h/8th Place	8	7	3	1	3	206	199
(Switzerland) 2006	Main round	9	6	2	0	4	166	181

== Head coaches ==
- (Serbia and Montenegro) Zoran Živković (1995–1997)
- (Serbia and Montenegro) Jovica Elezović (1997)
- (Serbia and Montenegro) Zoran Živković (1997–1999)
- (Serbia and Montenegro) Veselin Vujović (2000)
- (Serbia and Montenegro) Branislav Pokrajac (2000–2001)
- (Serbia and Montenegro) Zoran Živković (2001–2002)
- (Serbia and Montenegro) Zoran Kurteš (2002–2003)
- (Serbia and Montenegro) Veselin Vujović (2003–2006)
- (Serbia and Montenegro) Jovica Elezović (2006)
