= Serbia and Montenegro Handball Super League =

- Founded: 1992; 34 years ago
- Folded: 2006; 20 years ago
- Country: Serbia and Montenegro
- Confederation: EHF
- Most titles: Partizan (6)
- Level on pyramid: 1
- International cups: EHF Champions League; EHF Cup; EHF Cup Winners' Cup; EHF Challenge Cup

Serbia and Montenegro Handball Super League was the highest-level national handball league competition in Serbia and Montenegro. It was replaced in 2006 by the Serbian Handball Super League and Montenegrin Handball League.

== Champions ==
Season	Champion
1992–93	Partizan
1993–94	Partizan
1994–95	Partizan
1995–96	Crvena zvezda
1996–97	Crvena zvezda
1997–98	Crvena zvezda
1998–99	Partizan
1999–2000	Lovćen
2000–01	Lovćen
2001–02	Partizan
2002–03	Partizan
2003–04	Crvena zvezda
2004–05	Vojvodina
2005–06	Crvena zvezda

== Results by teams ==
Teams	Titles	Seasons
Partizan	6	1992–93, 1993–94, 1994–95, 1998–99, 2001–02, 2002–03
Crvena zvezda	5	1995–96, 1996–97, 1997–98, 2003–04, 2005–06
Lovćen	2	1999–2000, 2000–01
Vojvodina	1	2004–05

== See also ==
- Yugoslav Handball Championship
- Serbian Handball Super League
