= 2022 European Men's Handball Championship squads =

This article displays the squads for the 2022 European Men's Handball Championship. Each team had a provisional list of 35 players. Each roster consisted of up to 20 players, of whom 16 may be fielded for each match.

Age, club, caps and goals as of 13 January 2022.

== Group A ==
=== Denmark ===
A 20-player squad was announced on 16 December. On 15 January Hans Lindberg replaced an injured Jóhan Hansen.

Head coach: Nikolaj Jacobsen

No.	Pos.	Name	Date of birth (age)	Height	App.	Goals	Club
1	GK	Niklas Landin Jacobsen	19 December 1988 (aged 33)	2.01 m	233	10	(Germany) THW Kiel
3	RB	Niclas Kirkeløkke	26 March 1994 (aged 27)	1.95 m	40	60	(Germany) Rhein-Neckar Löwen
4	LW	Magnus Landin Jacobsen	20 August 1995 (aged 26)	1.97 m	90	182	(Germany) THW Kiel
7	LW	Emil Jakobsen	24 January 1998 (aged 23)	1.90 m	23	87	(Germany) SG Flensburg-Handewitt
8	P	René Antonsen	4 March 1992 (aged 29)	1.96 m	5	4	(Denmark) Aalborg Håndbold
11	CB	Rasmus Lauge	20 June 1991 (aged 30)	1.95 m	126	317	(Hungary) Telekom Veszprém
15	P	Magnus Saugstrup	12 July 1996 (aged 25)	1.95 m	41	81	(Germany) SC Magdeburg
16	GK	Jannick Green	29 September 1988 (aged 33)	1.95 m	137	2	(Germany) SC Magdeburg
17	RW	Lasse Svan Hansen	31 August 1983 (aged 38)	1.85 m	235	553	(Germany) SG Flensburg-Handewitt
18	RW	Hans Lindberg	1 August 1981 (aged 40)	1.88 m	272	756	(Germany) Füchse Berlin
20	GK	Kevin Møller	20 June 1989 (aged 32)	2.00 m	52	6	(Germany) SG Flensburg-Handewitt
21	LB	Henrik Møllgaard	2 January 1985 (aged 37)	1.97 m	180	182	(Denmark) Aalborg Håndbold
22	CB	Mads Mensah Larsen	12 August 1991 (aged 30)	1.88 m	158	298	(Germany) SG Flensburg-Handewitt
23	P	Henrik Toft Hansen	18 December 1986 (aged 35)	2.00 m	140	252	(France) Paris Saint-Germain
24	LB	Mikkel Hansen	22 October 1987 (aged 34)	1.92 m	231	1190	(France) Paris Saint-Germain
26	RW	Jóhan Hansen	1 May 1994 (aged 27)	1.90 m	56	117	(Germany) TSV Hannover-Burgdorf
28	LB	Lasse Andersson	11 March 1994 (aged 27)	1.96 m	53	65	(Germany) Füchse Berlin
29	LB	Aaron Mensing	11 November 1997 (aged 24)	1.98 m	5	11	(Germany) SG Flensburg-Handewitt
32	LB	Jacob Holm	5 September 1995 (aged 26)	1.94 m	51	146	(Germany) Füchse Berlin
33	RB	Mathias Gidsel	8 February 1999 (aged 22)	1.90 m	27	122	(Denmark) GOG Håndbold
34	P	Simon Hald	29 September 1994 (aged 27)	2.03 m	49	61	(Germany) SG Flensburg-Handewitt

=== Montenegro ===
A 25-player squad was announced on 18 December.

Head coach: Zoran Roganović

No.	Pos.	Name	Date of birth (age)	Height	App.	Goals	Club
1	GK	Nikola Matović	8 May 1998 (aged 23)	1.91 m	7	0	(North Macedonia) HC Struga
2	LW	Filip Vujović	7 April 1996 (aged 25)	1.88 m	15	15	(Spain) BM Nava
3	CB	Aleksandar Glendža	1 December 1995 (aged 26)	1.97 m	7	5	(Romania) HC Buzău
8	P	Vuk Lazović	10 March 1988 (aged 33)	2.00 m	30	17	(South Korea) SK Hawks
9	CB	Radojica Čepić	29 July 2002 (aged 19)	1.94 m	13	26	(Slovenia) RK Celje
11	RB	Branko Vujović	20 April 1998 (aged 23)	1.96 m	26	63	(Poland) Łomża Vive Kielce
12	GK	Mile Mijušković	8 October 1985 (aged 36)	1.95 m	42	0	(Spain) BM Burgos
13	RW	Mirko Radović	15 June 1990 (aged 31)	1.86 m	53	45	(North Macedonia) RK Eurofarm Pelister
17	CB	Vasilije Kaluđerović	3 October 1998 (aged 23)	1.91 m	9	8	(Germany) 1. VfL Potsdam
18	P	Nebojša Simović	15 November 1993 (aged 28)	1.99 m	14	13	(France) Saran Loiret Handball
19	P	Luka Vujović	11 April 2000 (aged 21)	1.92 m	2	0	(Slovenia) RK Koper
20	LB	Stevan Vujović	7 April 1990 (aged 31)	1.90 m	48	102	(Romania) CS Minaur Baia Mare
21	LB	Vasko Ševaljević	21 June 1988 (aged 33)	1.93 m	67	278	(France) Saran Loiret Handball
22	RB	Luka Vukićević	2 April 2002 (aged 19)	1.89 m	0	0	(Austria) Bregenz Handball
24	LB	Miloš Božović	10 December 1994 (aged 27)	1.99 m	38	91	(France) US Ivry Handball
27	LW	Jovan Abramović	18 November 2003 (aged 18)	1.89 m	0	0	(Serbia) RK Vojvodina
29	RW	Balša Čejović	29 December 1999 (aged 22)	1.77 m	0	0	(Greece) AC Diomidis Argous
32	CB	Božo Anđelić	16 March 1992 (aged 29)	1.86 m	44	72	(Hungary) Ferencvárosi TC
33	CB	Božidar Simić	14 June 1997 (aged 24)	1.89 m	0	0	(Slovenia) RD Ribnica
40	GK	Jagoš Braunović	10 September 1998 (aged 23)	1.87 m	4	0	(North Macedonia) GRK Ohrid
43	CB	Bogdan Nikolić	7 May 1992 (aged 29)	1.94 m	0	0	(Bosnia and Herzegovina) RK Sloboda Tuzla
44	P	Miodrag Ćorsović	22 February 2000 (aged 21)	1.98 m	0	0	(Slovenia) RK Trimo Trebnje
90	P	Nemanja Grbović	26 April 1990 (aged 31)	1.83 m	67	183	(Romania) Steaua București
	RW	Vojislav Vukić	5 March 2003 (aged 18)	1.80 m

=== North Macedonia ===
A 24-player squad was announced on 17 December.

Head coach: Kiril Lazarov

No.	Pos.	Name	Date of birth (age)	Height	App.	Goals	Club
1	GK	Nikola Mitrevski	3 October 1985 (aged 36)	1.88 m	120	2	(Portugal) FC Porto
4	RB	Martin Velkovski	10 March 1997 (aged 24)	1.90 m	32	7	(North Macedonia) RK Eurofarm Pelister
5	P	Stojanče Stoilov	30 April 1987 (aged 34)	1.91 m	73	143	(North Macedonia) RK Vardar 1961
7	RB	Kiril Lazarov	10 May 1980 (aged 41)	1.95 m	207	1443	(France) HBC Nantes
8	LW	Cvetan Kuzmanoski	5 December 1999 (aged 22)	1.92 m	3	0	(North Macedonia) RK Eurofarm Pelister 2
9	CB	Igor Gjorgiev	2 June 2000 (aged 21)	1.89 m	0	0	(North Macedonia) RK Alkaloid
10	CB	Marko Mitev	23 February 2003 (aged 18)	1.83 m	0	0	(North Macedonia) RK Butel Skopje
11	LB	Filip Taleski	28 March 1996 (aged 25)	2.00 m	50	109	(North Macedonia) RK Vardar 1961
12	GK	Martin Tomovski	10 July 1997 (aged 24)	1.94 m	12	0	(North Macedonia) RK Vardar 1961
13	CB	Filip Mirkulovski	14 September 1983 (aged 38)	1.89 m	170	315	(Germany) HSG Wetzlar
14	P	Kristijan Simonoski	29 May 2000 (aged 21)	1.87 m	0	0	(North Macedonia) RK Golden Art KL7
17	P	Nikola Markoski	22 May 1990 (aged 31)	1.98 m	66	17	(North Macedonia) RK Alkaloid
18	LB	Filip Kuzmanovski	3 July 1996 (aged 25)	1.98 m	48	61	(Germany) TSV Hannover-Burgdorf
19	RW	Nenad Kosteski	4 March 2001 (aged 20)	1.89 m	10	2	(North Macedonia) RK Eurofarm Pelister
20	GK	Marko Kizikj	22 January 2001 (aged 20)	1.98 m	0	0	(North Macedonia) RK Eurofarm Pelister
22	RW	Goce Georgievski	12 February 1987 (aged 34)	1.85 m	120	280	(North Macedonia) RK Vardar 1961
25	CB	Goran Krstevski	29 March 1996 (aged 25)	1.96 m	21	3	(Romania) CSM Focșani
26	LW	Goce Ojleski	10 October 1989 (aged 32)	1.80 m	27	21	(North Macedonia) RK Eurofarm Pelister
31	LB	Mihajlo Mladenovikj	21 September 2000 (aged 21)	1.95 m	2	0	(North Macedonia) GRK Ohrid
33	P	Žarko Peševski	11 April 1991 (aged 30)	1.95 m	55	69	(Germany) TVB 1898 Stuttgart
66	LW	Bojan Madzovski	8 May 1994 (aged 27)	1.84 m	11	10	(North Macedonia) RK Eurofarm Pelister
77	RB	Martin Serafimov	3 March 2000 (aged 21)	1.90 m	7	1	(North Macedonia) RK Alkaloid
92	P	Kostadin Petrov	30 March 1992 (aged 29)	1.90 m	0	0	(North Macedonia) RK Metalurg Skopje
97	CB	Marko Miševski	23 August 1999 (aged 22)	1.99 m	11	0	(North Macedonia) RK Vardar 1961

=== Slovenia ===
A -player squad was announced on 26 December.

Head coach: (Sweden) Ljubomir Vranjes

No.	Pos.	Name	Date of birth (age)	Height	App.	Goals	Club
1	GK	Jože Baznik	24 May 1993 (aged 28)	1.87 m	2	0	(France) Cesson Rennes MHB
2	CB	Staš Skube	15 November 1989 (aged 32)	1.79 m	28	51	(Belarus) Meshkov Brest
3	P	Blaž Blagotinšek	17 January 1994 (aged 27)	2.03 m	101	186	(Hungary) Telekom Veszprém
5	LB	Nik Henigman	4 December 1995 (aged 26)	2.01 m	59	89	(Hungary) Pick Szeged
6	RW	Gašper Marguč	20 August 1990 (aged 31)	1.80 m	113	395	(Hungary) Telekom Veszprém
8	RW	Blaž Janc	20 November 1996 (aged 25)	1.85 m	79	272	(Spain) FC Barcelona
9	LB	Vid Levc	23 November 1994 (aged 27)	1.98 m	1	0	(Slovenia) RK Slovenj Gradec 2011
11	RB	Jure Dolenec	6 December 1988 (aged 33)	1.91 m	161	598	(France) Limoges Handball
12	GK	Aljaž Panjtar	20 August 1991 (aged 30)	1.83 m	2	0	(Slovenia) RK Gorenje Velenje
15	P	Vid Poteko	5 April 1991 (aged 30)	1.94 m	60	34	(Slovenia) Celje Pivovarna Laško
20	LW	Tilen Kodrin	14 May 1995 (aged 26)	1.92 m	51	73	(Slovenia) Celje Pivovarna Laško
23	CB	Miha Zarabec	12 October 1991 (aged 30)	1.78 m	79	183	(Germany) THW Kiel
25	LW	Tilen Sokolič	5 September 1996 (aged 25)	1.80 m	0	0	(Slovenia) RK Gorenje Velenje
34	CB	Rok Ovniček	29 January 1995 (aged 26)	1.85 m	34	33	(France) HBC Nantes
35	CB	Domen Makuc	1 July 2000 (aged 21)	1.88 m	4	13	(Spain) FC Barcelona
41	RB	Matic Grošelj	22 September 1997 (aged 24)	1.96 m	11	16	(France) C' Chartres Métropole Handball
51	LB	Borut Mačkovšek	11 September 1992 (aged 29)	2.03 m	119	293	(Hungary) Pick Szeged
69	RB	Tadej Kljun	18 April 2001 (aged 20)	1.96 m	0	0	(Portugal) S.L. Benfica
90	GK	Urban Lesjak	24 August 1990 (aged 31)	1.88 m	59	0	(Germany) TSV Hannover-Burgdorf
95	P	Matic Suholežnik	2 May 1995 (aged 26)	2.02 m	40	35	(Slovenia) Celje Pivovarna Laško
99	GK	Urh Kastelic	27 February 1996 (aged 25)	2.02 m	47	5	(Germany) Frisch Auf Göppingen

== Group B ==
=== Hungary ===
A 21-player squad was announced on 23 December.

Head coach: István Gulyás

No.	Pos.	Name	Date of birth (age)	Height	App.	Goals	Club
2	P	Adrián Sipos	8 March 1990 (age 36)	2.00 m	40	24	(Hungary) Telekom Veszprém
3	P	Petar Topic	30 December 1991 (age 34)	2.01 m	7	17	(Hungary) Balatonfüredi KSE
7	LW	Bendegúz Bóka	2 October 1993 (age 32)	1.90 m	46	103	(Hungary) Balatonfüredi KSE
11	LB	Patrik Ligetvári	13 February 1996 (aged 24)	2.01 m	57	58	(Hungary) Telekom Veszprém
12	GK	Márton Székely	2 January 1990 (age 36)	1.94 m	61	0	(North Macedonia) RK Eurofarm Pelister
15	CB	Mátyás Győri	2 February 1997 (age 29)	1.94 m	20	49	(Hungary) Grundfos Tatabánya
16	GK	Roland Mikler	20 September 1984 (age 42)	1.92 m	217	1	(Hungary) Pick Szeged
17	CB	Bence Nagy	5 July 1995 (age 31)	1.95 m	16	26	(Hungary) Ferencvárosi TC
20	P	Miklós Rosta	14 February 1999 (age 27)	2.03 m	24	37	(Hungary) Pick Szeged
21	RB	Zorán Ilic	2 January 2002 (age 24)	2.00 m	2	0	(Hungary) Telekom Veszprém
22	LW	Stefan Sunajko	10 April 1998 (age 28)	1.94 m	9	21	(Hungary) Grundfos Tatabánya
23	RB	Dominik Máthé	1 April 1999 (age 27)	2.01 m	32	103	(Norway) Elverum Håndball
24	GK	Ádám Borbély	22 June 1995 (age 31)	1.97 m	18	0	(Hungary) Veszprém KKFT
25	RW	Pedro Rodríguez Álvarez	22 August 1990 (age 36)	1.93 m	9	21	(Hungary) Balatonfüredi KSE
27	P	Bence Bánhidi	9 February 1995 (age 31)	2.08 m	81	238	(Hungary) Pick Szeged
29	RW	Bendegúz Bujdosó	10 December 1994 (age 31)	1.80 m	4	6	(Hungary) Ferencvárosi TC
30	LB	Zoltán Szita	10 February 1998 (age 28)	1.97 m	33	73	(Poland) Orlen Wisła Płock
33	RB	Gábor Ancsin	27 November 1990 (age 35)	2.02 m	123	255	(Hungary) Grundfos Tatabánya
39	LB	Richárd Bodó	13 March 1993 (age 33)	2.03 m	74	209	(Hungary) Pick Szeged
66	CB	Máté Lékai	16 June 1988 (age 38)	1.90 m	143	407	(Hungary) Telekom Veszprém
77	CB	Egon Hanusz	25 September 1997 (age 28)	1.77 m	12	15	(Germany) TVB 1898 Stuttgart

=== Iceland ===
A 20-player squad was announced on 21 December. Sveinn Jóhannsson was replaced by Daníel Þór Ingason on 5 January, as he was injured.

Head coach: Guðmundur Guðmundsson

No.	Pos.	Name	Date of birth (age)	Height	App.	Goals	Club
1	GK	Björgvin Páll Gústavsson	24 May 1985 (aged 36)	1.90 m	236	16	(Iceland) Valur
3	CB	Janus Daði Smárason	1 January 1995 (aged 27)	1.84 m	49	69	(Germany) Frisch Auf Göppingen
4	LB	Aron Pálmarsson	19 July 1990 (aged 31)	1.93 m	152	593	(Denmark) Aalborg Håndbold
7	RB	Viggó Kristjánsson	9 December 1993 (aged 28)	1.87 m	21	55	(Germany) TVB 1898 Stuttgart
8	LW	Bjarki Már Elísson	16 May 1990 (aged 31)	1.90 m	82	230	(Germany) TBV Lemgo
9	CB	Elvar Örn Jónsson	31 August 1997 (aged 24)	1.85 m	46	120	(Germany) MT Melsungen
10	CB	Gísli Þorgeir Kristjánsson	30 July 1999 (aged 22)	1.91 m	32	51	(Germany) SC Magdeburg
11	P	Ýmir Örn Gíslason	1 July 1997 (aged 24)	1.92 m	52	23	(Germany) Rhein-Neckar Löwen
13	LB	Ólafur Guðmundsson	13 May 1990 (aged 31)	1.94 m	133	266	(France) Montpellier Handball
14	RB	Ómar Ingi Magnússon	12 March 1997 (aged 24)	1.84 m	56	150	(Germany) SC Magdeburg
16	GK	Viktor Gísli Hallgrímsson	24 July 2000 (aged 21)	2.03 m	25	0	(Denmark) GOG Håndbold
18	P	Elliði Snær Viðarsson	15 November 1998 (aged 23)	1.92 m	13	14	(Germany) VfL Gummersbach
19	LB	Daníel Þór Ingason	15 November 1995 (aged 26)	1.95 m	34	9	(Germany) HBW Balingen-Weilstetten
20	GK	Ágúst Elí Björgvinsson	11 April 1995 (aged 26)	1.86 m	41	1	(Denmark) KIF Kolding
21	P	Arnar Freyr Arnarsson	14 March 1996 (aged 25)	2.01 m	63	76	(Germany) MT Melsungen
22	RW	Sigvaldi Guðjónsson	4 July 1994 (aged 27)	1.93 m	39	86	(Poland) Łomża Vive Kielce
23	RB	Kristján Örn Kristjánsson	25 December 1997 (aged 24)	1.90 m	12	18	(France) Pays d'Aix UC
24	RB	Teitur Örn Einarsson	23 September 1998 (aged 23)	1.90 m	21	22	(Germany) SG Flensburg-Handewitt
28	LW	Orri Freyr Þorkelsson	25 June 1999 (aged 22)	1.85 m	1	1	(Norway) Elverum Håndball
36	LB	Elvar Ásgeirsson	4 September 1994 (aged 27)	1.94 m	0	0	(France) Grand Nancy MHB

=== Netherlands ===
A 16-player squad was announced on 13 December.

Head coach: (Iceland) Erlingur Richardsson

No.	Pos.	Name	Date of birth (age)	Height	App.	Goals	Club
1	GK	Bart Ravensbergen	14 March 1993 (aged 28)	1.90 m	68	6	(Germany) HSG Nordhorn-Lingen
5	LW	Rutger ten Velde	5 March 1997 (aged 24)	1.78 m	30	58	(Germany) TuS Ferndorf
7	LB	Robin Schoenaker	23 August 1995 (aged 26)	1.98 m	22	1	(Belgium) Sporting Pelt
9	CB	Florent Bourget	12 June 1998 (aged 23)	1.86 m	2	1	(Netherlands) Volendam
11	RB	Iso Sluijters	24 July 1990 (aged 31)	1.92 m	84	180	(Switzerland) GC Amicitia Zürich
12	CB	Luc Steins	22 March 1995 (aged 26)	1.73 m	72	209	(France) Paris Saint-Germain
13	P	Samir Benghanem	10 December 1993 (aged 28)	1.94 m	36	51	(Netherlands) Green Park/Aalsmeer
14	RW	Bobby Schagen	13 January 1990 (aged 32)	1.90 m	97	321	(Germany) TBV Lemgo
17	P	Ivo Steins	18 July 1992 (aged 29)	1.80 m	72	91	(Netherlands) OCI-LIONS
20	RB	Niels Versteijnen	3 February 2000 (aged 21)	2.00 m	17	17	(Germany) VfL Lübeck-Schwartau
25	LB	Ephrahim Jerry	27 May 1996 (aged 25)	1.96 m	45	105	(Switzerland) Kadetten Schaffhausen
26	GK	Dennis Schellekens	8 October 1990 (aged 31)	1.91 m	24	0	(Netherlands) Volendam
31	RB	Kay Smits	31 March 1997 (aged 24)	1.86 m	55	210	(Germany) SC Magdeburg
32	LW	Tommie Falke	8 February 1993 (aged 28)	1.83 m	32	86	(Belgium) Sporting Pelt
34	RB	Tom Jansen	18 June 1998 (aged 23)	1.99 m	4	4	(Germany) TV Großwallstadt
77	CB	Dani Baijens	5 May 1998 (aged 23)	1.82 m	43	72	(Germany) ASV Hamm-Westfalen

=== Portugal ===
A 19-player squad was announced on 27 December. The final roster was revealed on 11 January.

Head coach: Paulo Pereira

No.	Pos.	Name	Date of birth (age)	Height	App.	Goals	Club
5	LB	Gilberto Duarte	6 July 1990 (aged 31)	1.97 m	107	299	(France) Montpellier Handball
8	P	Victor Iturriza	22 May 1990 (aged 31)	1.93 m	22	71	(Portugal) FC Porto
10	CB	Miguel Martins	4 November 1997 (aged 24)	1.92 m	67	153	(Hungary) Pick Szeged
12	GK	Manuel Gaspar	9 December 1998 (aged 23)	1.93 m	9	0	(Portugal) Sporting CP
13	RB	Ángel Hernández	4 February 1994 (aged 27)	1.88 m	3	4	Kuwait SC
14	CB	Rui Silva	28 April 1993 (aged 28)	1.86 m	104	169	(Portugal) FC Porto
15	P	Daymaro Salina	1 September 1987 (aged 34)	2.00 m	65	120	(Portugal) FC Porto
17	P	Tiago Rocha	17 October 1985 (aged 36)	1.96 m	140	355	(France) Grand Nancy MHB
18	RB	Daniel Vieira	19 July 2000 (aged 21)	1.91 m	0	0	(Portugal) Artística de Avanca
23	LW	Diogo Branquinho	25 July 1994 (aged 27)	1.85 m	66	156	(Portugal) FC Porto
24	LB	Alexandre Cavalcanti	27 December 1996 (aged 25)	2.01 m	53	70	(France) HBC Nantes
25	RW	António Areia	21 June 1990 (aged 31)	1.90 m	66	183	(Portugal) FC Porto
29	RW	Miguel Alves	22 July 1996 (aged 25)	1.89 m	3	15	(Portugal) FC Porto
30	LW	Leonel Fernandes	12 March 1998 (aged 23)	1.91 m	13	14	(Portugal) FC Porto
31	LB	Salvador Salvador	29 July 2001 (aged 20)	1.96 m	4	6	(Portugal) Sporting CP
41	GK	Gustavo Capdeville	31 August 1997 (aged 24)	1.90 m	24	0	(Portugal) S.L. Benfica
79	CB	Martim Costa	27 September 2002 (aged 19)	1.88 m	0	0	(Portugal) Sporting CP
88	LB	Fábio Magalhães	12 March 1988 (aged 33)	1.94 m	160	325	(Portugal) FC Porto

== Group C ==
=== Croatia ===
An 18-player squad was announced on 30 December.

Head coach: Hrvoje Horvat

No.	Pos.	Name	Date of birth (age)	Height	App.	Goals	Club
2	LW	Lovro Mihić	25 August 1994 (aged 27)	1.81 m	37	46	(Poland) Orlen Wisła Płock
5	CB	Domagoj Duvnjak	1 June 1988 (age 38)	1.97 m	223	720	(Germany) THW Kiel
8	CB	Ante Gadža	26 August 1992 (aged 29)	1.95 m	5	9	(North Macedonia) RK Vardar 1961
12	GK	Ivan Pešić	17 March 1989 (age 37)	1.94 m	47	1	(Germany) TVB 1898 Stuttgart
16	GK	Matej Mandić	2 May 2002 (aged 19)	2.04 m	4	0	(Croatia) PPD Zagreb
24	RB	Šime Ivić	21 January 1993 (aged 28)	1.95 m	9	16	(Germany) SC DHfK Leipzig
27	RW	Ivan Čupić	27 March 1986 (aged 35)	1.78 m	159	585	(Croatia) PPD Zagreb
30	LB	Marko Mamić	6 March 1994 (age 32)	2.02 m	65	104	(Germany) SC DHfK Leipzig
33	CB	Luka Cindrić	5 July 1993 (aged 28)	1.82 m	76	191	(Spain) FC Barcelona
35	GK	Mate Šunjić	18 March 1987 (aged 34)	1.95 m	21	0	(France) US Ivry Handball
39	LW	David Mandić	14 September 1997 (aged 24)	1.87 m	46	127	(Croatia) PPD Zagreb
40	P	Nikola Grahovac	14 December 1998 (aged 23)	2.01 m	3	1	(Croatia) PPD Zagreb
45	LB	Halil Jaganjac	22 June 1998 (aged 23)	2.00 m	28	54	(Croatia) Nexe Našice
51	RB	Ivan Martinović	6 January 1998 (age 28)	1.94 m	5	9	(Germany) TSV Hannover-Burgdorf
52	P	Leon Šušnja	5 August 1993 (aged 28)	2.04 m	10	18	(Poland) Orlen Wisła Płock
53	P	Marin Šipić	29 April 1996 (aged 25)	1.90 m	35	58	(Croatia) PPD Zagreb
57	RW	Filip Glavaš	6 May 1997 (aged 24)	1.83 m	0	0	(Slovenia) RK Trimo Trebnje
58	LB	Zvonimir Srna	18 January 1998 (aged 23)	2.02 m	3	1	(Croatia) PPD Zagreb

=== France ===
A 20-player squad was announced on 28 December. On 23 December it was announced that Nedim Remili would miss the tournament, due to a foot injury. Luka Karabatić had to withdraw on 31 December, due to an injury. Due to positive COVID-19 tests by some players, some changes were made on 2 January 2022. An updated 20-player roster was nominated on 7 January.

Head coach: Guillaume Gille

No.	Pos.	Name	Date of birth (age)	Height	App.	Goals	Club
2	RW	Yanis Lenne	29 June 1996 (aged 25)	1.87 m	18	20	(France) Montpellier Handball
4	CB	Aymeric Minne	20 April 1997 (aged 24)	1.86 m	3	7	(France) HBC Nantes
6	RW	Julien Bos	18 August 1998 (aged 23)	1.88 m	2	1	(France) Montpellier Handball
7	CB	Romain Lagarde	5 March 1997 (aged 24)	1.94 m	56	70	(France) Pays d’Aix UC
9	RB	Melvyn Richardson	30 January 1997 (aged 24)	1.90 m	42	98	(Spain) FC Barcelona
10	RB	Dika Mem	31 August 1997 (aged 24)	1.94 m	78	223	(Spain) FC Barcelona
11	P	Nicolas Tournat	5 April 1994 (aged 27)	2.00 m	56	98	(Poland) Łomża Vive Kielce
12	GK	Vincent Gérard	16 December 1986 (aged 35)	1.88 m	123	17	(France) Paris Saint-Germain
13	CB	Nikola Karabatić	11 April 1984 (aged 37)	1.96 m	324	1238	(France) Paris Saint-Germain
14	CB	Kentin Mahé	22 May 1991 (aged 30)	1.86 m	136	439	(Hungary) Telekom Veszprém
23	P	Ludovic Fabregas	1 July 1996 (aged 25)	1.98 m	98	203	(Spain) FC Barcelona
24	GK	Wesley Pardin	1 January 1990 (aged 32)	1.95 m	22	0	(France) Pays d’Aix UC
25	LW	Hugo Descat	16 August 1992 (aged 29)	1.83 m	29	115	(France) Montpellier Handball
28	RW	Valentin Porte	7 September 1990 (aged 31)	1.90 m	153	373	(France) Montpellier Handball
29	RW	Benoît Kounkoud	19 February 1997 (aged 24)	1.88 m	18	20	(France) Paris Saint-Germain
31	LW	Dylan Nahi	30 November 1999 (aged 22)	1.92 m	12	31	(Poland) Łomża Vive Kielce
33	P	Théo Monar	6 June 2001 (aged 20)	2.00 m	3	12	(France) HBC Nantes
34	LB	Karl Konan	3 June 1995 (aged 26)	1.97 m	3	2	(France) Pays d’Aix UC
39	LB	Thibaud Briet	14 December 1999 (aged 22)	2.05 m	0	0	(France) HBC Nantes
92	GK	Remi Desbonnet	28 February 1992 (aged 29)	1.82 m	5	0	(France) USAM Nîmes Gard

=== Serbia ===
A 24-player squad was announced on 15 December. After some changes, with Petar Nenadić missing the tournament due to an injury, the list was reduced to 21 players on 2 January.

Head coach: (Spain) Toni Gerona

No.	Pos.	Name	Date of birth (age)	Height	App.	Goals	Club
1	GK	Milan Bomaštar	10 July 1999 (aged 22)	2.01 m	2	0	(Spain) ABANCA Ademar León
5	RB	Milan Milić	14 May 1998 (aged 23)	1.98 m	24	68	(France) HBC Nantes
6	LB	Uroš Borzaš	28 July 1999 (aged 22)	1.88 m	3	8	(France) Fenix Toulouse
8	LB	Stevan Sretenović	25 September 1995 (aged 26)	2.01 m	26	58	(Belarus) Meshkov Brest
10	RW	Darko Đukić	11 December 1994 (aged 27)	1.91 m	44	114	(North Macedonia) RK Vardar 1961
11	LB	Ilija Abutović	2 August 1988 (aged 33)	2.02 m	46	25	(Germany) Rhein-Neckar Löwen
13	P	Živan Pešić	7 July 1993 (aged 28)	1.93 m	34	74	(Israel) Hapoel Rishon LeZion
17	RW	Bogdan Radivojević	2 March 1993 (aged 28)	1.92 m	62	219	(Hungary) Pick Szeged
19	LW	Nemanja Ilić	11 May 1990 (aged 31)	1.76 m	91	344	(France) Fenix Toulouse
20	P	Dragan Pechmalbec	5 January 1996 (aged 26)	1.94 m	1	4	(France) HBC Nantes
21	LW	Vanja Ilić	25 February 1993 (aged 28)	1.85 m	49	119	(France) C' Chartres MHB
24	CB	Lazar Kukić	12 December 1995 (aged 26)	1.88 m	30	79	(Portugal) S.L. Benfica
25	RB	Nemanja Zelenović	27 February 1990 (aged 31)	1.94 m	92	264	(Germany) Frisch Auf Göppingen
30	RB	Jovica Nikolić	18 November 2001 (aged 20)	1.90 m	11	28	(Serbia) RK Vojvodina
31	CB	Đorđe Đekić	28 August 1993 (aged 28)	1.89 m	0	0	(Finland) Riihimäki Cocks
33	P	Mijajlo Marsenić	9 March 1993 (aged 28)	2.02 m	95	264	(Germany) Füchse Berlin
36	RB	Miloš Orbović	2 November 1993 (aged 28)	1.93 m	11	18	(Switzerland) HC Kriens-Luzern
39	LB	Marko Milosavljević	13 September 1998 (aged 23)	2.01 m	4	17	(Spain) ABANCA Ademar León
44	LB	Petar Đorđić	17 September 1990 (aged 31)	1.96 m	36	86	(Portugal) S.L. Benfica
76	GK	Vladimir Cupara	19 February 1994 (aged 27)	1.99 m	54	3	(Hungary) Telekom Veszprém
96	GK	Dejan Milosavljev	16 March 1996 (aged 25)	1.96 m	43	2	(Germany) Füchse Berlin

=== Ukraine ===
A 24-player squad was announced on 19 December. It was reduced to 21 on 2 January.

Head coach: (Germany) Michael Biegler

No.	Pos.	Name	Date of birth (age)	Height	App.	Goals	Club
1	GK	Anton Terekhov	28 July 1992 (aged 29)	1.94 m	8	0	(Romania) CS Minaur Baia Mare
2	CB	Vladyslav Zalevskyi	19 September 1998 (aged 23)	1.90 m	2	6	(Russia) Dynamo Astrakhan
4	LB	Yevhen Buinenko	20 September 1992 (aged 29)	2.01 m	30	22	(Israel) Maccabi Dimona
8	LW	Oleksandr Kasai	14 January 1997 (aged 24)	1.83 m	0	0	(Ukraine) HC Motor Zaporozhye
10	P	Dmytro Tiutiunnyk	7 March 1993 (aged 28)	2.00 m	27	41	(Ukraine) HC Motor Zaporozhye
15	CB	Oleksandr Tilte	10 April 1995 (aged 26)	1.98 m	51	92	(Ukraine) HC Motor Zaporozhye
18	LW	Stanislav Pliasun	5 June 1996 (aged 25)	1.84 m	3	8	(Russia) CSKA-SHVSM
19	RW	Eduard Kravchenko	19 May 1996 (aged 25)	1.80 m	3	12	(Ukraine) HC Motor Zaporozhye
21	LW	Yevhen Zhuk	4 August 1990 (aged 31)	1.87 m	51	85	(Russia) Permskie Medvedi
23	RB	Vladyslav Dontsov	22 September 1995 (aged 26)	2.00 m	14	28	(Ukraine) HC Motor Zaporozhye
24	LB	Dmytro Horiha	8 October 1997 (aged 24)	1.96 m	21	43	(Ukraine) HC Motor Zaporozhye
25	RW	Daniil Glushak	8 July 2000 (aged 21)	1.91 m	0	0	(Lithuania) Dragūnas Klaipėda
27	P	Ivan Burzak	22 February 1998 (aged 23)	2.00 m	15	21	(Ukraine) HC Motor Zaporozhye
28	GK	Maksym Viunik	28 February 1996 (aged 25)	1.98 m	3	0	(Ukraine) HC Motor Zaporozhye
33	RW	Illia Blyzniuk	19 February 2001 (aged 20)	1.85 m	0	0	(Ukraine) Motor-Politekhnika
34	LB	Ihor Turchenko	4 December 2000 (aged 21)	1.93 m	2	1	(Ukraine) HC Motor Zaporozhye
37	CB	Taras Minotskyi	15 January 2000 (aged 21)	1.93 m	5	10	(Poland) Grupa Azoty Unia Tarnów
55	GK	Gennadiy Komok	5 July 1987 (aged 34)	1.97 m	49	2	(Ukraine) HC Motor Zaporozhye
77	P	Dmytro Ilchenko	9 July 1996 (aged 25)	1.98 m	18	40	(Russia) CSKA Moscow
93	LW	Dmytro Artemenko	18 January 1996 (aged 25)	1.80 m	18	41	(Russia) Dynamo Astrakhan
98	LB	Maxym Strelnikov	8 January 1997 (aged 25)	2.03 m	2	3	(Switzerland) Chênois Genève Handball

== Group D ==
=== Austria ===
An 18-player squad was announced on 22 December. The final roster was revealed on 12 January.

Head coach: (Slovenia) Aleš Pajovič

No.	Pos.	Name	Date of birth (age)	Height	App.	Goals	Club
2	LB	Alexander Hermann	10 December 1991 (aged 30)	1.92 m	77	133	(Germany) VfL Gummersbach
7	RB	Janko Bozovic	14 July 1985 (aged 36)	2.04 m	161	450	(Germany) VfL Gummersbach
8	RW	Robert Weber	25 November 1985 (aged 36)	1.79 m	197	863	(Germany) HSG Nordhorn-Lingen
15	P	Fabian Posch	5 January 1988 (aged 34)	1.98 m	114	199	(Austria) UHK Krems
20	LW	Sebastian Frimmel	18 December 1995 (aged 26)	1.90 m	75	211	(Hungary) Pick Szeged
24	LB	Daniel Dicker	5 June 1995 (aged 26)	1.98 m	28	24	(Germany) ThSV Eisenach
26	P	Lukas Herburger	19 December 1994 (aged 27)	1.97 m	48	34	(Switzerland) Kadetten Schaffhausen
28	CB	Gerald Zeiner	28 June 1988 (aged 33)	1.90 m	66	128	(Austria) Handball Tirol
30	RB	Boris Zivkovic	2 May 1992 (aged 29)	1.95 m	42	56	(Poland) Azoty-Puławy
32	GK	Golub Doknic	16 April 1982 (aged 39)	1.95 m	3	0	(Austria) Alpla HC Hard
39	GK	Ralf Häusle	30 December 1994 (aged 27)	1.89 m	3	0	(Austria) Bregenz Handball
44	RW	Julian Ranftl	17 February 1996 (aged 25)	1.85 m	28	38	(Austria) SG Handball West Wien
45	LW	Eric Damböck	6 September 1999 (aged 22)	1.81 m	5	4	(Austria) Fivers Margareten
53	CB	Nikola Bilyk	28 November 1996 (aged 25)	1.98 m	78	333	(Germany) THW Kiel
55	P	Tobias Wagner	26 March 1995 (aged 26)	1.98 m	70	134	(France) Fenix Toulouse
72	LB	Lukas Hutecek	2 July 2000 (aged 21)	1.89 m	23	63	(Germany) TBV Lemgo

=== Belarus ===
A 25-player squad was announced on 16 December. It was reduced to 18 on 4 January.

Head coach: Yuri Shevtsov

No.	Pos.	Name	Date of birth (age)	Height	App.	Goals	Club
1	GK	Ivan Matskevich	8 May 1991 (aged 30)	1.93 m	93	5	(Belarus) Meshkov Brest
3	LB	Uladzislau Kulesh	28 May 1996 (aged 25)	2.06 m	89	332	(Poland) Łomża Vive Kielce
7	CB	Artsiom Kulak	23 February 1996 (aged 25)	1.91 m	26	65	(Russia) Chekhovskiye Medvedi
9	RB	Aleh Astrashapkin	20 January 1992 (aged 29)	1.90 m	57	65	(Russia) CSKA Moscow
14	RW	Yauheni Nikanovich	14 July 2000 (aged 21)	1.82 m	2	0	(Belarus) SKA Minsk
16	GK	Viachaslau Saldatsenka	23 July 1994 (aged 27)	1.89 m	81	2	(Belarus) Meshkov Brest
17	LW	Uladzislau Kryvenka	21 April 1999 (aged 22)	1.87 m	11	5	(Belarus) SKA Minsk
23	LW	Andrei Yurynok	21 September 1996 (aged 25)	1.96 m	98	272	(Belarus) Meshkov Brest
25	P	Viktar Zaitsau	27 August 1992 (aged 29)	2.04 m	49	33	(Russia) Permskie Medvedi
44	CB	Ihar Bialiauski	12 January 2002 (aged 20)	1.92 m	2	0	(Belarus) SKA Minsk
55	RW	Mikita Vailupau	30 July 1995 (aged 26)	1.86 m	51	230	(Belarus) Meshkov Brest
62	LB	Kiryl Samoila	31 January 2002 (aged 19)	2.00 m	11	19	(Belarus) SKA Minsk
65	RB	Matsvei Udavenia	14 March 2000 (aged 21)	1.95 m	4	5	(Belarus) SKA Minsk
74	P	Viachaslau Bokhan	7 April 1996 (aged 25)	2.06 m	59	59	(Ukraine) HC Motor Zaporozhye
95	CB	Vadim Gayduchenko	24 April 1995 (aged 26)	1.93 m	76	172	(France) Saint-Raphaël Var Handball
98	RB	Mikalai Aliokhin	9 April 1998 (aged 23)	1.90 m	27	25	(Belarus) SKA Minsk
	GK	Ihar Chernikau	4 February 1995 (aged 26)	1.98 m	1	0	(Greece) AC Diomidis Argous
	P	Mikhail Zhyla	8 October 1993 (aged 28)	1.99 m	0	0	(Belarus) SKA Minsk

=== Germany ===
A 19-player squad was announced on 21 December.

Head coach: (Iceland) Alfreð Gíslason

No.	Pos.	Name	Date of birth (age)	Height	App.	Goals	Club
4	P	Johannes Golla	5 November 1997 (aged 24)	1.95 m	35	94	(Germany) SG Flensburg-Handewitt
7	P	Patrick Wiencek	22 March 1989 (aged 32)	2.00 m	153	308	(Germany) THW Kiel
11	LB	Sebastian Heymann	1 March 1998 (aged 23)	1.98 m	14	25	(Germany) Frisch Auf Göppingen
17	RW	Lukas Zerbe	17 January 1996 (aged 25)	1.84 m	4	6	(Germany) TBV Lemgo
18	CB	Julian Köster	16 March 2000 (aged 21)	2.00 m	4	3	(Germany) VfL Gummersbach
19	RB	Djibril M'Bengue	13 May 1992 (aged 29)	1.95 m	4	8	(Portugal) FC Porto
20	CB	Philipp Weber	15 September 1992 (aged 29)	1.94 m	55	135	(Germany) SC Magdeburg
25	RB	Kai Häfner	10 July 1989 (aged 32)	1.92 m	114	247	(Germany) MT Melsungen
31	LW	Marcel Schiller	15 August 1991 (aged 30)	1.89 m	31	133	(Germany) Frisch Auf Göppingen
33	GK	Andreas Wolff	3 March 1991 (aged 30)	1.98 m	118	13	(Poland) Łomża Vive Kielce
35	LB	Julius Kühn	1 April 1993 (aged 28)	1.98 m	87	272	(Germany) MT Melsungen
36	LW	Lukas Mertens	22 March 1996 (aged 25)	1.82 m	4	7	(Germany) SC Magdeburg
40	CB	Simon Ernst	2 April 1994 (aged 27)	1.96 m	43	36	(Germany) SC DHfK Leipzig
41	GK	Joel Birlehm	25 April 1997 (aged 24)	1.96 m	4	0	(Germany) SC DHfK Leipzig
44	RB	Christoph Steinert	18 January 1990 (aged 31)	1.96 m	6	12	(Germany) HC Erlangen
48	P	Jannik Kohlbacher	19 July 1995 (aged 26)	1.93 m	80	164	(Germany) Rhein-Neckar Löwen
73	RW	Timo Kastening	25 June 1995 (aged 26)	1.80 m	40	136	(Germany) MT Melsungen
98	GK	Till Klimpke	1 April 1998 (aged 23)	1.98 m	9	0	(Germany) HSG Wetzlar
99	CB	Luca Witzke	3 April 1999 (aged 22)	1.92 m	4	4	(Germany) SC DHfK Leipzig

=== Poland ===
A 26-player squad was announced on 22 December. It was cut to 21 on 31 December. Due to seven positive COVID-19 tests, some changes were made on 12 January. Rafał Przybylski was added to the squad on 16 January. Piotr Chrapkowski, Jan Czuwara and Dawid Dawydzik were added to the squad on 20 January. Damian Przytuła was added to the squad on 21 January.

Head coach: Patryk Rombel

No.	Pos.	Name	Date of birth (age)	Height	App.	Goals	Club
1	GK	Mateusz Kornecki	5 June 1994 (aged 27)	1.94 m	48	3	(Poland) Łomża Vive Kielce
2	LB	Damian Przytuła	27 November 1998 (aged 23)	2.00 m	14	15	(Poland) Górnik Zabrze
3	RB	Michał Daszek	27 June 1992 (aged 29)	1.82 m	118	299	(Poland) Orlen Wisła Płock
4	CB	Piotr Jędraszczyk	9 October 2001 (aged 20)	1.77 m	0	0	(Poland) Piotrkowianin Piotrków Tryb.
5	CB	Michał Olejniczak	31 January 2001 (aged 20)	1.93 m	30	48	(Poland) Łomża Vive Kielce
6	RW	Krzysztof Komarzewski	18 September 1998 (aged 23)	1.88 m	7	13	(Poland) Orlen Wisła Płock
7	P	Patryk Walczak	29 July 1992 (aged 29)	1.99 m	55	38	(North Macedonia) RK Vardar 1961
8	P	Bartłomiej Bis	25 March 1997 (aged 24)	1.94 m	5	1	(Poland) Górnik Zabrze
9	LB	Szymon Sićko	20 August 1997 (aged 24)	2.00 m	43	99	(Poland) Łomża Vive Kielce
12	LB	Ariel Pietrasik	21 October 1999 (aged 22)	2.02 m	0	0	(Switzerland) TSV St. Otmar St. Gallen
13	GK	Miłosz Wałach	23 November 2001 (aged 20)	1.95 m	0	0	(Poland) Torus Wybrzeże Gdańsk
18	LB	Melwin Beckman	5 August 2000 (aged 21)	1.98 m	2	5	(Sweden) HK Aranäs
19	LW	Jan Czuwara	18 October 1995 (aged 26)	1.84 m	42	65	(North Macedonia) RK Vardar 1961
20	CB	Maciej Pilitowski	27 October 1990 (aged 31)	1.88 m	34	36	(Poland) Energa MKS Kalisz
21	P	Kamil Syprzak	23 July 1991 (aged 30)	2.07 m	144	282	(France) Paris Saint-Germain
23	RW	Arkadiusz Moryto	31 August 1997 (aged 24)	1.82 m	67	304	(Poland) Łomża Vive Kielce
26	LW	Przemysław Krajewski	20 January 1987 (aged 34)	1.84 m	138	324	(Poland) Orlen Wisła Płock
28	P	Maciej Gębala	10 January 1994 (aged 28)	2.00 m	69	89	(Germany) SC DHfK Leipzig
30	RB	Rafał Przybylski	19 February 1991 (aged 30)	2.00 m	84	161	(Poland) Azoty-Puławy
36	P	Dawid Dawydzik	17 December 1994 (aged 27)	2.00 m	29	36	(Poland) Azoty-Puławy
40	GK	Mateusz Zembrzycki	18 March 1997 (aged 24)	1.95 m	2	0	(Poland) Azoty-Puławy
44	LW	Mikołaj Czapliński	8 November 2000 (aged 21)	1.88 m	0	0	(Poland) Orlen Wisła Płock
49	LB	Piotr Chrapkowski	24 March 1988 (aged 33)	2.03 m	128	173	(Germany) SC Magdeburg

== Group E ==
=== Bosnia and Herzegovina ===
A 21-player squad was announced on 23 December.

Head coach: (Croatia) Ivica Obrvan

No.	Pos.	Name	Date of birth (age)	Height	App.	Goals	Club
1	GK	Nebojša Bojić	30 December 1996 (aged 25)	1.94 m			(Slovenia) Celje Pivovarna Laško
2	CB	Milan Vukšić	12 February 2000 (aged 21)	1.72 m			(Bosnia and Herzegovina) RK Izviđač CO
3	LW	Alen Ovčina	27 February 1989 (aged 32)	1.89 m	62	162	(Bosnia and Herzegovina) RK Sloboda Tuzla
4	CB	Josip Perić	5 June 1992 (aged 29)	1.80 m	46	68	(North Macedonia) RK Eurofarm Pelister
5	LB	Mirko Herceg	26 February 1992 (aged 29)	1.95 m	10	20	(Hungary) Csurgói KK
7	RB	Aleksandar Milojević	18 May 1992 (aged 29)	1.98 m			(Bosnia and Herzegovina) RK Leotar Trebinje
11	LB	Edin Klis	22 February 2000 (aged 21)	1.95 m			(Croatia) PPD Zagreb
13	RW	Ibrahim Haseljić	14 January 1998 (aged 23)	1.92 m	15	43	(Slovenia) RK Gorenje Velenje
14	CB	Mirsad Terzić	12 July 1983 (aged 38)	1.96 m			(Poland) Orlen Wisła Płock
15	P	Adin Faljić	24 September 2000 (aged 21)	1.97 m			(Croatia) PPD Zagreb
16	GK	Admir Ahmetašević	5 June 1994 (aged 27)	1.95 m	3	0	(Poland) Orlen Wisła Płock
18	CB	Ivan Karačić	26 May 1985 (aged 36)	1.90 m			(Israel) Maccabi Rishon LeZion
19	LB	Nikola Prce	31 August 1980 (aged 41)	2.00 m			(Kosovo) KH Besa Famgas
21	P	Vladimir Vranješ	14 December 1988 (aged 33)	2.00 m	79	135	(Belarus) Meshkov Brest
22	RB	Dejan Malinović	12 April 1992 (aged 29)	1.91 m			(Hungary) Balatonfüredi KSE
23	LB	Dino Hamidović	11 July 1996 (aged 25)	1.95 m	9	11	(Hungary) Gyöngyösi KK
30	LW	Enes Keškić	29 December 1999 (aged 22)	1.83 m			(Germany) Die Eulen Ludwigshafen
32	LW	Vlado Draganić	28 December 1991 (aged 30)	1.87 m			(Bosnia and Herzegovina) RK Borac M:tel
33	RW	Luka Perić	13 March 2003 (aged 18)	1.95 m			(Bosnia and Herzegovina) RK Borac M:tel
40	GK	Harun Hodžić	7 June 2000 (aged 21)	1.95 m			(France) Chambéry SMBH
59	P	Elmir Građan	28 December 1993 (aged 28)	1.90 m			(North Macedonia) RK Eurofarm Pelister

=== Czech Republic ===
A 21-player squad was announced on 31 December.

Head coach: Rastislav Trtík

No.	Pos.	Name	Date of birth (age)	Height	App.	Goals	Club
1	GK	Tomáš Mrkva	20 January 1989 (aged 32)	2.03 m	103	6	(Germany) Bergischer HC
2	LW	Jakub Hrstka	17 March 1990 (aged 31)	1.88 m	121	392	(Germany) Dessau-Roßlauer HV
3	CB	Roman Bečvář	18 April 1989 (aged 32)	1.91 m	127	265	(Luxembourg) Red Boys Differdange
5	RW	Miroslav Jurka	7 June 1987 (aged 34)	1.89 m	94	186	(Czech Republic) HC Zubří
7	RB	Tomáš Piroch	12 May 2000 (aged 21)	1.87 m	10	14	(France) US Créteil Handball
17	RB	Stanislav Kašpárek	11 June 1996 (aged 25)	2.00 m	44	157	(Belarus) Meshkov Brest
18	P	Vít Reichl	15 June 1993 (aged 28)	1.88 m	2	10	(Germany) TV Hüttenberg
19	CB	Tomáš Babák	28 December 1993 (aged 28)	1.86 m	76	242	(Germany) Bergischer HC
21	RW	Tomáš Číp	5 October 1989 (aged 32)	1.89 m	89	210	(Romania) CS Minaur Baia Mare
23	P	Leoš Petrovský	5 January 1993 (aged 29)	2.02 m	70	169	(Germany) TuS Nettelstedt-Lübbecke
26	LW	Marek Vančo	12 July 1989 (aged 32)	1.80 m	41	44	(Germany) HC Elbflorenz
31	LB	Matěj Klíma	24 March 1999 (aged 22)	1.92 m	15	51	(Germany) VfL Lübeck-Schwartau
32	LB	Vojtěch Patzel	23 September 1998 (aged 23)	1.90 m	20	28	(Czech Republic) HCB Karviná
34	LB	Dominik Solák	17 August 1997 (aged 24)	1.98 m	25	13	(Czech Republic) HCB Karviná
37	P	Jan Užek	11 October 1993 (aged 28)	1.94 m	31	36	(Czech Republic) HCB Karviná
39	CB	Lukáš Mořkovský	4 January 2002 (aged 20)	1.89 m	1	0	(Czech Republic) HC Zubří
40	RB	Dieudonné Mubenzem	22 March 1996 (aged 25)	1.90 m	41	50	(Germany) HSC 2000 Coburg
61	GK	Karel Šmíd	4 June 1993 (aged 28)	1.85 m	3	0	(Czech Republic) Talent M.A.T. Plzeň
66	P	Štěpán Zeman	9 May 1997 (aged 24)	1.97 m	40	38	(Germany) VfL Gummersbach
71	GK	Šimon Mizera	29 December 2000 (aged 21)	1.90 m	8	1	(Czech Republic) HC Zubří
96	P	Václav Franc	10 August 1996 (aged 25)	2.01 m	8	0	(Czech Republic) HCB Karviná

=== Spain ===
A 19-player squad was announced on 30 December.

Head coach: Jordi Ribera

No.	Pos.	Name	Date of birth (age)	Height	App.	Goals	Club
1	GK	Gonzalo Pérez de Vargas	10 January 1991 (aged 31)	1.90 m	138	14	(Spain) FC Barcelona
3	RB	Eduardo Gurbindo	8 November 1987 (aged 34)	1.96 m	144	184	(Romania) Dinamo București
4	P	Iñaki Peciña	31 May 1988 (aged 33)	2.00 m	23	17	(France) Pays d'Aix UC
5	RB	Jorge Maqueda	6 February 1988 (aged 33)	1.97 m	166	418	(Hungary) Telekom Veszprém
6	LW	Ángel Fernández	16 September 1988 (aged 33)	1.92 m	87	264	(Spain) FC Barcelona
12	GK	Rodrigo Corrales	24 January 1991 (aged 30)	2.00 m	99	4	(Hungary) Telekom Veszprém
14	RW	Ferran Solé	25 August 1992 (aged 29)	1.92 m	76	304	(France) Paris Saint-Germain
17	P	Adrià Figueras	31 August 1988 (aged 33)	1.92 m	94	252	(France) C' Chartres MHB
21	LB	Joan Cañellas	30 September 1986 (aged 35)	1.98 m	205	505	(Switzerland) Kadetten Schaffhausen
25	CB	Agustín Casado	21 May 1996 (aged 25)	1.93 m	4	7	(Spain) BM Logroño La Rioja
27	LB	Antonio García	6 March 1984 (aged 37)	1.91 m	90	179	(Spain) BM Granollers
29	LW	Aitor Ariño	5 October 1992 (aged 29)	1.87 m	74	146	(Spain) FC Barcelona
30	RW	Aleix Gómez	7 May 1997 (aged 24)	1.82 m	60	210	(Spain) FC Barcelona
35	P	Gedeón Guardiola	1 October 1984 (aged 37)	2.05 m	170	198	(Germany) TBV Lemgo
38	CB	Ian Tarrafeta	4 January 1999 (aged 23)	1.88 m	11	22	(France) Pays d'Aix UC
51	LW	Miguel Sánchez-Migallón	8 February 1995 (aged 26)	2.00 m	14	15	(Poland) Łomża Vive Kielce
58	LB	Chema Márquez	20 December 1996 (aged 25)	1.87 m	4	8	(Spain) BM Granollers
61	GK	Sergey Hernández	17 June 1995 (aged 26)	1.97 m	26	8	(Portugal) S.L. Benfica
64	RW	Kauldi Odriozola	7 January 1997 (aged 25)	1.83 m	19	67	(Spain) Bidasoa Irun

=== Sweden ===
An 18-player squad was announced on 13 December. On 10 January it was announced Emil Mellegård would replace Lucas Pellas due to COVID-19. On 17 January Valter Chrintz joined the squad due to a positive COVID-19 test from Daniel Pettersson. On 19 January Isak Persson joined the squad due to a positive COVID-19 test from Niclas Ekberg. On 24 January Jonathan Edvardsson joined the squad due to a positive COVID-19 test from Felix Claar. On 27 January Linus Persson joined the squad due to a positive COVID-19 test from Lukas Sandell. On January 28 Lucas Pellas joined the squad due to a positive COVID-19 test from Hampus Wanne.

Head coach: (Norway) Glenn Solberg

No.	Pos.	Name	Date of birth (age)	Height	App.	Goals	Club
1	GK	Peter Johannesson	12 May 1992 (aged 29)	1.91 m	18	2	(Germany) TBV Lemgo
2	LB	Jonathan Carlsbogård	19 April 1995 (aged 26)	1.95 m	27	57	(Germany) TBV Lemgo
3	RW	Isak Persson	7 November 2000 (aged 21)	1.90 m	1	0	(Sweden) Lugi HF
4	LW	Emil Mellegård	6 November 1997 (aged 24)	1.91 m	7	13	(Germany) HSG Wetzlar
5	P	Max Darj	27 September 1991 (aged 30)	1.92 m	85	76	(Germany) Bergischer HC
6	P	Felix Möller	4 September 2002 (aged 19)	1.95 m	2	0	(Sweden) IK Sävehof
10	RW	Niclas Ekberg	23 December 1988 (aged 33)	1.91 m	190	778	(Germany) THW Kiel
11	RW	Daniel Pettersson	6 May 1992 (aged 29)	1.79 m	54	134	(Germany) SC Magdeburg
12	GK	Andreas Palicka	10 July 1986 (aged 35)	1.89 m	129	11	(Sweden) Redbergslids IK
15	LW	Hampus Wanne	10 December 1993 (aged 28)	1.85 m	54	202	(Germany) SG Flensburg-Handewitt
18	P	Fredric Pettersson	11 February 1989 (aged 32)	2.01 m	81	108	(France) Fenix Toulouse
19	CB	Felix Claar	5 January 1997 (aged 25)	1.92 m	34	65	(Denmark) Aalborg Håndbold
22	LW	Lucas Pellas	28 August 1995 (aged 26)	1.84 m	40	120	(France) Montpellier Handball
23	RB	Albin Lagergren	11 September 1992 (aged 29)	1.86 m	72	214	(Germany) Rhein-Neckar Löwen
24	CB	Jim Gottfridsson	2 September 1992 (aged 29)	1.91 m	116	371	(Germany) SG Flensburg-Handewitt
26	RB	Linus Persson	16 April 1993 (aged 28)	1.91 m	27	59	(France) HBC Nantes
28	CB	Jonathan Edvardsson	7 April 1997 (aged 24)	1.90 m	11	3	(Germany) TSV Hannover-Burgdorf
30	GK	Tobias Thulin	5 July 1995 (aged 26)	1.98 m	26	0	(Germany) TVB 1898 Stuttgart
32	P	Oscar Bergendahl	8 March 1995 (aged 26)	1.92 m	15	26	(Denmark) GOG Håndbold
33	RB	Lukas Sandell	3 February 1997 (aged 24)	1.92 m	21	53	(Denmark) Aalborg Håndbold
42	LB	Eric Johansson	28 June 2000 (aged 21)	1.98 m	3	8	(Norway) Elverum Håndball
49	LB	Karl Wallinius	14 January 1999 (aged 22)	1.99 m	3	0	(France) Montpellier Handball
62	RW	Valter Chrintz	26 April 2000 (aged 21)	1.85 m	27	46	(Germany) Füchse Berlin

== Group F ==
=== Lithuania ===
A 19-player squad was announced on 10 January.

Head coach: Mindaugas Andriuška

No.	Pos.	Name	Date of birth (age)	Height	App.	Goals	Club
3	LW	Mindaugas Urbonas	17 April 1992 (aged 29)	1.85 m	32	55	(Lithuania) HC Vilnius
5	CB	Žanas Gabrielius Virbauskas	3 April 1997 (aged 24)	1.80 m	28	53	(Spain) ABANCA Ademar León
7	CB	Aidenas Malašinskas	29 April 1986 (aged 35)	1.89 m	92	420	(Ukraine) HC Motor Zaporozhye
9	RB	Povilas Babarskas	13 December 1988 (aged 33)	1.95 m	52	115	(Germany) TV Grosswallstadt
11	CB	Benas Petreikis	9 February 1992 (aged 29)	1.87 m	52	129	(Germany) TuS Nettelstedt-Lübbecke
12	GK	Vilius Rašimas	8 November 1989 (aged 32)	1.96 m	71	1	(Iceland) Selfoss
13	RB	Gytis Šmantauskas	25 May 1997 (aged 24)	1.98 m	11	4	(Iceland) FH
14	LB	Gerdas Babarskas	14 February 1994 (aged 27)	1.97 m	45	111	(France) Chambéry SMBH
15	LB	Lukas Simėnas	8 May 1996 (aged 25)	2.07 m	30	39	(Spain) BM Los Dólmenes Antequera
16	GK	Lukas Gurskis	9 September 1997 (aged 24)	1.97 m	17	3	(Lithuania) HC Granitas
20	LW	Skirmantas Plėta	2 December 1989 (aged 32)	1.81 m	87	167	(Lithuania) VHC Šviesa
32	GK	Giedrius Morkūnas	7 November 1987 (aged 34)	1.88 m	59	7	(Lithuania) VHC Šviesa
34	RW	Mykolas Lapiniauskas	21 July 2000 (aged 21)	1.85 m	8	11	(Lithuania) HC Dragūnas Klaipėda
35	RW	Valdas Drabavičius	21 June 1990 (aged 31)	1.88 m	57	132	(Lithuania) VHC Šviesa
37	LW	Deividas Jovaišas	7 April 1998 (aged 23)	1.74 m	4	8	(Lithuania) HC Granitas
38	LB	Karolis Antanavičius	6 January 1998 (aged 24)	1.94 m	11	12	(Austria) Alpla HC Hard
39	LW	Deividas Virbauskas	19 April 1995 (aged 26)	1.80 m	3	8	(Russia) HC Don Cossack-SFU
55	P	Tadas Stankevičius	2 December 1990 (aged 31)	1.92 m	70	89	(Lithuania) HC Varsa-Stronglasas
71	CB	Lukas Juškenas	28 June 1996 (aged 25)	1.81 m	13	13	(Germany) HSC 2000 Coburg
88	RB	Mindaugas Dumčius	6 July 1995 (aged 26)	1.91 m	50	145	(Germany) HC Elbflorenz

=== Norway ===
A 20-player squad was announced on 8 December. On 23 December it was announced that Gøran Johannessen would miss the tournament, due to a groin injury. On 24 January, Endre Langaas was added to the squad.

Head coach: Christian Berge

No.	Pos.	Name	Date of birth (age)	Height	App.	Goals	Club
3	CB	Vetle Eck Aga	4 October 1993 (aged 28)	1.90 m	6	2	(Sweden) IK Sävehof
5	CB	Sander Sagosen	14 September 1995 (aged 26)	1.95 m	129	659	(Germany) THW Kiel
6	LW	Sebastian Barthold	27 August 1991 (aged 30)	1.84 m	39	57	(Denmark) Aalborg Håndbold
7	CB	Sander Øverjordet	8 April 1996 (aged 25)	1.97 m	24	13	(Denmark) Mors-Thy Håndbold
11	P	Petter Øverby	26 March 1992 (aged 29)	1.94 m	94	73	(Germany) HC Erlangen
12	GK	Kristian Sæverås	22 June 1996 (aged 25)	1.97 m	40	2	(Germany) SC DHfK Leipzig
13	LB	Erik Thorsteinsen Toft	14 November 1992 (aged 29)	1.92 m	5	12	(Denmark) Mors-Thy Håndbold
15	RB	Kent Robin Tønnesen	5 June 1991 (aged 30)	1.95 m	121	314	(Hungary) Pick Szeged
16	GK	Sander Heieren	23 October 1998 (aged 23)	1.90 m	2	0	(Norway) Drammen HK
19	RW	Kristian Bjørnsen	10 January 1989 (aged 33)	1.92 m	151	565	(Denmark) Aalborg Håndbold
21	P	Magnus Gullerud	13 November 1991 (aged 30)	1.93 m	148	193	(Germany) SC Magdeburg
24	CB	Christian O'Sullivan	22 August 1991 (aged 30)	1.90 m	144	231	(Germany) SC Magdeburg
26	LB	Simen Holand Pettersen	8 April 1998 (aged 23)	1.92 m	13	22	(Norway) Elverum Håndball
27	RB	Harald Reinkind	17 August 1992 (aged 29)	1.96 m	129	274	(Germany) THW Kiel
29	P	Endre Langaas	5 October 1991 (aged 30)	1.85 m	0	0	(Norway) Elverum Håndball
30	GK	Torbjørn Bergerud	16 July 1994 (aged 27)	2.00 m	108	0	(Denmark) GOG Håndbold
32	P	Thomas Solstad	26 February 1997 (aged 24)	1.90 m	12	11	(Norway) Elverum Håndball
44	RW	Kevin Gulliksen	9 November 1996 (aged 25)	1.85 m	59	109	(Germany) Frisch Auf Göppingen
71	LW	Alexander Blonz	17 April 2000 (aged 21)	1.83 m	44	86	(Hungary) Pick Szeged
89	RB	Christoffer Rambo	18 November 1989 (aged 32)	1.99 m	99	218	(Norway) IL Runar

=== Russia ===
A 22-player squad was announced on 26 December.

Head coach: (Germany) Velimir Petković

No.	Pos.	Name	Date of birth (age)	Height	App.	Goals	Club
1	GK	Artjom Grushko	20 June 1993 (aged 28)	1.93 m	2	0	(Russia) Chekhovskiye Medvedi
3	LB	Dmitrii Santalov	7 April 1996 (aged 25)	1.96 m	37	105	(Belarus) Meshkov Brest
5	RB	Dmitrii Kiselev	15 November 1994 (aged 27)	1.93 m	65	177	(Russia) CSKA Moscow
6	RW	Daniil Shishkaryov	6 July 1988 (aged 33)	1.90 m	145	356	(Russia) Chekhovskiye Medvedi
10	CB	Valentin Vorobev	27 May 1995 (aged 26)	1.90 m	4	6	(Russia) CSKA Moscow
17	RB	Alexander Kotov	11 July 1994 (aged 27)	1.98 m	41	49	(Russia) Chekhovskiye Medvedi
20	LB	Mikhail Vinogradov	4 April 1997 (aged 24)	1.94 m	10	6	(Austria) Bregenz Handball
22	P	Viacheslav Kasatkin	2 September 1996 (aged 25)	1.86 m	7	1	(Slovakia) Tatran Prešov
23	LW	Roman Ostashchenko	26 September 1992 (aged 29)	1.87 m	48	46	(Russia) Chekhovskiye Medvedi
24	RW	Dmitry Kornev	16 June 1992 (aged 29)	1.86 m	26	39	(Russia) Chekhovskiye Medvedi
25	LB	Evgenij Dzemin	30 August 1997 (aged 24)	2.07 m	0	0	(Russia) Chekhovskiye Medvedi
28	CB	Sergey Kudinov	29 June 1991 (aged 30)	1.95 m	46	39	(France) C' Chartres MHB
30	P	Aleksandr Ermakov	14 January 1996 (aged 25)	1.95 m	26	39	(Russia) Chekhovskiye Medvedi
32	GK	Andrei Vereshchagin	22 January 1997 (aged 24)	1.98 m	2	0	(Russia) Permskie Medvedi
39	RW	Ilia Demin	10 July 2000 (aged 21)	1.87 m	3	5	(Russia) Dynamo Astrakhan
44	LW	Igor Soroka	27 May 1991 (aged 30)	1.80 m	74	211	(Russia) CSKA Moscow
52	RB	Sergej Ivanov	16 October 2000 (aged 21)	2.00 m	11	7	(Russia) CSKA Moscow
76	P	Radomir Vrachevich	19 May 1999 (aged 22)	1.96 m	0	0	(Russia) Dinamo Viktor Stavropol
78	P	Pavel Andreev	19 July 1992 (aged 29)	1.97 m	28	59	(Russia) Chekhovskiye Medvedi
87	GK	Viktor Kireyev	5 May 1987 (aged 34)	1.90 m	89	1	(Russia) CSKA Moscow
89	CB	Dmitry Zhitnikov	20 November 1989 (aged 32)	1.97 m	147	383	(Poland) Orlen Wisła Płock
99	LB	Sergei Kosorotov	16 June 1999 (aged 22)	2.00 m	43	118	(Poland) Orlen Wisła Płock

=== Slovakia ===
A 21-player squad was announced on 27 December. Michal Konečný was replaced by Igor Chupryna on 4 January 2022.

Head coach: Peter Kukučka

No.	Pos.	Name	Date of birth (age)	Height	App.	Goals	Club
1	GK	Teodor Paul	22 April 1987 (aged 34)	1.94 m	110	1	(France) USAM Nîmes Gard
2	LB	Oliver Rábek	30 September 1987 (aged 34)	2.04 m	65	234	(Slovakia) Tatran Prešov
3	RB	Patrik Hruščák	20 March 1989 (aged 32)	2.04 m	80	204	(Slovakia) Košice Crows
5	RB	Marek Korbel	6 March 1995 (aged 26)	1.92 m	10	5	(Czech Republic) Talent M.A.T. Plzeň
7	P	Šimon Macháč	30 September 1993 (aged 28)	1.91 m	20	31	(Hungary) SBS-Eger
10	CB	Tomáš Rečičár	30 November 1998 (aged 23)	1.90 m	18	23	(Slovakia) Tatran Prešov
11	LW	Martin Briatka	6 June 1991 (aged 30)	1.82 m	36	54	(Slovakia) MŠK Považská Bystrica
18	LB	Jakub Prokop	21 August 1998 (aged 23)	1.92 m	16	24	(Spain) BM Nava
19	CB	Martin Potisk	28 January 1999 (aged 22)	1.90 m	9	14	(Germany) ThSV Eisenach
20	RW	Tomáš Urban	17 September 1989 (aged 32)	1.88 m	126	310	(Germany) GWD Minden
21	CB	Ľubomír Ďuriš	5 September 1987 (aged 34)	1.75 m	89	152	(Hungary) Gyöngyösi KK
23	LW	Lukáš Péchy	24 March 1997 (aged 24)	1.89 m	6	16	(Slovakia) HC Sporta Hlohovec
25	RB	Marek Kováčech	25 January 1989 (aged 32)	1.82 m	20	32	(Austria) Handball Sportunion Leoben
30	RB	Marek Hniďák	6 June 2001 (aged 20)	2.00 m	0	0	(Germany) HC Burgenland
39	CB	Tomáš Smetánka	6 June 2002 (aged 19)	1.83 m	0	0	(Spain) BM Nava
47	LB	Lukáš Urban	22 June 1995 (aged 26)	2.01 m	40	90	(Hungary) Grundfos Tatabánya
48	P	Dominik Kalafut	15 June 1995 (aged 26)	1.96 m	18	25	(Germany) HSG Nordhorn-Lingen
49	P	Martin Slaninka	16 July 1989 (aged 32)	2.02 m	54	72	(Switzerland) HSC Suhr Aarau
67	GK	Marián Žernovič	1 July 1991 (aged 30)	1.86 m	44	1	(Hungary) Ferencvárosi TC
73	GK	Igor Chupryna	25 April 1990 (aged 31)	2.00 m	5	0	(Russia) HC Don Cossack-SFU
81	LB	Jakub Mikita	7 May 1993 (aged 28)	1.96 m	26	76	(Hungary) Ceglédi KKSE

== Statistics ==
=== Coaches representation by country ===
Coaches in bold represent their own country.

Nº	Country	Coaches
3	Iceland	Alfreð Gíslason (Germany), **Guðmundur Guðmundsson**, Erlingur Richardsson (Netherlands)
2	Croatia	Ivica Obrvan (Bosnia and Herzegovina), **Hrvoje Horvat**
2	Germany	Velimir Petković (Russia), Michael Biegler (Ukraine)
2	Norway	**Christian Berge**, Glenn Solberg (Sweden)
2	Spain	Toni Gerona (Serbia), **Jordi Ribera**
1	Belarus	**Yuri Shevtsov**
1	Czech Republic	**Rastislav Trtík**
1	Denmark	**Nikolaj Jacobsen**
1	France	**Guillaume Gille**
1	Hungary	**István Gulyás**
1	Lithuania	**Mindaugas Andriuška**
1	Montenegro	**Zoran Roganović**
1	North Macedonia	**Kiril Lazarov**
1	Poland	**Patryk Rombel**
1	Portugal	**Paulo Pereira**
1	Slovakia	**Peter Kukučka**
1	Slovenia	Aleš Pajovič (Austria)
1	Sweden	Ljubomir Vranjes (Slovenia)

=== Player representation by league system ===
In all, European Championship squad members play for clubs in 36 different countries.

League	Teams																								Total
League	(Austria)	(Belarus)	(Bosnia and Herzegovina)	(Croatia)	(Czech Republic)	(Denmark)	(France)	(Germany)	(Hungary)	(Iceland)	(Lithuania)	(Montenegro)	(Netherlands)	(North Macedonia)	(Norway)	(Poland)	(Portugal)	(Russia)	(Serbia)	(Slovakia)	(Slovenia)	(Spain)	(Sweden)	(Ukraine)	Total
Germany	6	-	1	5	9	15	-	17	1	11	4	1	7	3	7	1	-	-	4	4	3	1	12	-	112
France	1	1	1	1	1	2	14	-	-	3	1	3	1	1	-	1	3	1	5	1	4	4	2	-	51
Hungary	1	-	3	-	-	1	1	-	17	-	-	1	-	-	2	-	1	-	2	5	4	2	-	-	40
Poland	1	1	2	2	-	-	2	1	1	1	-	1	-	-	-	14	-	2	-	-	-	1	-	1	30
North Macedonia	-	-	2	1	-	-	-	-	1	-	-	3	-	18	-	1	-	-	1	-	-	-	-	-	27
Russia	-	3	-	-	-	-	-	-	-	-	1	-	-	-	-	-	-	16	-	1	-	-	-	5	26
Spain	-	-	-	1	-	-	3	-	-	-	2	2	-	-	-	-	-	-	2	2	2	8	-	-	22
Portugal	-	-	-	-	-	-	-	1	-	-	-	-	-	1	-	-	13	-	2	-	1	1	-	-	19
Belarus	-	11	1	-	1	-	-	-	-	-	-	-	-	-	-	-	-	1	1	-	1	-	-	-	16
Denmark	-	-	-	-	-	3	-	-	-	3	-	-	-	-	5	-	-	-	-	-	-	-	3	-	14
Slovenia	-	-	2	1	-	-	-	-	-	-	-	5	-	-	-	-	-	-	-	-	6	-	-	-	14
Ukraine	-	1	-	-	-	-	-	-	-	-	1	-	-	-	-	-	-	-	-	-	-	-	-	11	13
Austria	6	-	-	-	-	-	-	-	-	-	1	1	-	-	-	-	-	1	-	1	-	-	-	-	10
Croatia	-	-	2	7	-	-	-	-	-	-	-	-	-	-	-	-	-	-	-	-	-	-	-	-	9
Czech Republic	-	-	-	-	8	-	-	-	-	-	-	-	-	-	-	-	-	-	-	1	-	-	-	-	9
Lithuania	-	-	-	-	-	-	-	-	-	-	8	-	-	-	-	-	-	-	-	-	-	-	-	1	9
Norway	-	-	-	-	-	-	-	-	1	1	-	-	-	-	5	-	-	-	-	-	-	-	1	-	8
Switzerland	1	-	-	-	-	-	-	-	-	-	-	-	2	-	-	1	-	-	1	1	-	1	-	1	8
Romania	-	-	-	-	1	-	-	-	-	-	-	3	-	1	-	-	-	-	-	-	-	1	-	1	7
Bosnia and Herzegovina	-	-	5	-	-	-	-	-	-	-	-	1	-	-	-	-	-	-	-	-	-	-	-	-	6
Slovakia	-	-	-	-	-	-	-	-	-	-	-	-	-	-	-	-	-	1	-	5	-	-	-	-	6
Sweden	-	-	-	-	-	-	-	-	-	-	-	-	-	-	1	1	-	-	-	-	-	-	3	-	5
Netherlands	-	-	-	-	-	-	-	-	-	-	-	-	4	-	-	-	-	-	-	-	-	-	-	-	4
Iceland	-	-	-	-	-	-	-	-	-	1	2	-	-	-	-	-	-	-	-	-	-	-	-	-	3
Belgium	-	-	-	-	-	-	-	-	-	-	-	-	2	-	-	-	-	-	-	-	-	-	-	-	2
Greece	-	1	-	-	-	-	-	-	-	-	-	1	-	-	-	-	-	-	-	-	-	-	-	-	2
Israel	-	-	1	-	-	-	-	-	-	-	-	-	-	-	-	-	-	-	1	-	-	-	-	1	2
Serbia	-	-	-	-	-	-	-	-	-	-	-	1	-	-	-	-	-	-	1	-	-	-	-	-	2
Finland	-	-	-	-	-	-	-	-	-	-	-	-	-	-	-	-	-	-	1	-	-	-	-	-	1
Kosovo	-	-	1	-	-	-	-	-	-	-	-	-	-	-	-	-	-	-	-	-	-	-	-	-	1
Kuwait	-	-	-	-	-	-	-	-	-	-	-	-	-	-	-	-	1	-	-	-	-	-	-	-	1
Luxembourg	-	-	-	-	1	-	-	-	-	-	-	-	-	-	-	-	-	-	-	-	-	-	-	-	1
South Korea	-	-	-	-	-	-	-	-	-	-	-	1	-	-	-	-	-	-	-	-	-	-	-	-	1
