= Melwin =

Melwin is a masculine given name. Notable people with the name include:

- Melwin Beckman (born 2000), Polish handball player
- Melwin Cedeño (born 1964), Puerto Rican actor, dancer and comedian
- Melwin Lycke Holm (born 2004), Swedish high jumper
