= Nebojša Grahovac =

Bosnian handball player

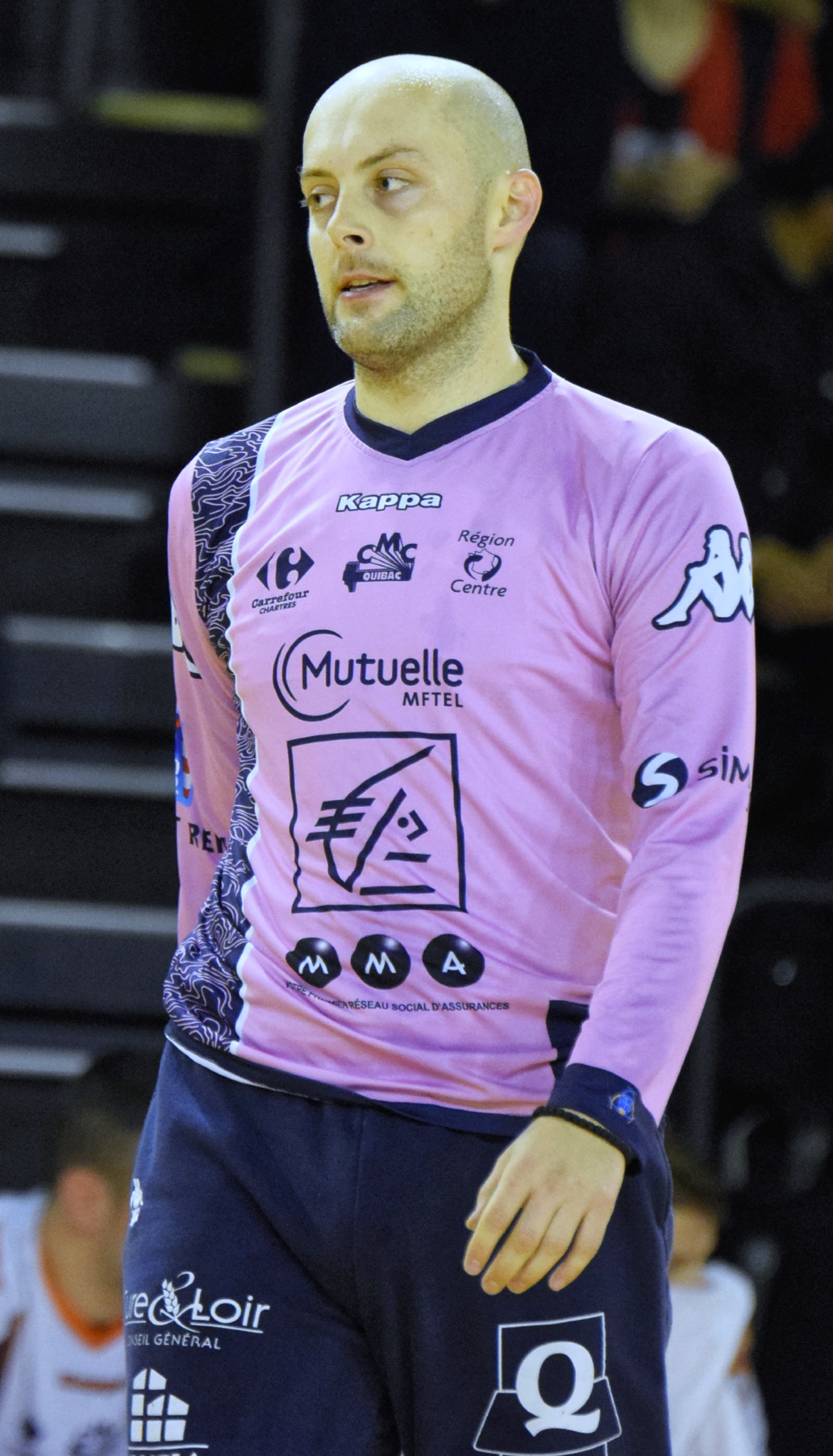

Personal information
- Nationality: Bosnian
- Born: 11 February 1984 (age 42) Prijedor, SFR Yugoslavia
- Height: 1.91 m (6 ft 3 in)

Sport
- Sport: Handball
- Position: Goalkeeper
- Current club: C' Chartres MHB
- Number: 1

Senior clubs
- Years: Team
- 2001–2007: RK Borac Banja Luka
- 2007–2010: RK Bosna Sarajevo
- 2010–2013: Chambéry Savoie Handball
- 2013–: C' Chartres MHB
National team
Years	Team	Apps	(Gls)
2006–	Bosnia and Herzegovina	86	(2)

Nebojša Grahovac (born 11 February 1984) is a Bosnian handball player for C' Chartres MHB and the Bosnia and Herzegovina national team.

He previously played for RK Prijedor, Borac Banja Luka, Bosna Sarajevo and Chambéry.
