= Aleksei Fokin =

Russian handball player

Personal information
- Nationality: Russian
- Born: 29 August 1997 (age 29)
- Height: 1.85 m (6 ft 1 in)

Sport
- Sport: Handball
- Position: Right wing
- Current club: HC Meshkov Brest
- Number: 27
National team
Years	Team	Apps	(Gls)
2019–	Russia	7	(4)

Aleksei Fokin (born 29 August 1997) is a Russian handball player for HC Meshkov Brest and the Russian national team.

He represented Russia at the 2019 World Men's Handball Championship.
