= Viachaslau Shumak =

Belarusian handball player

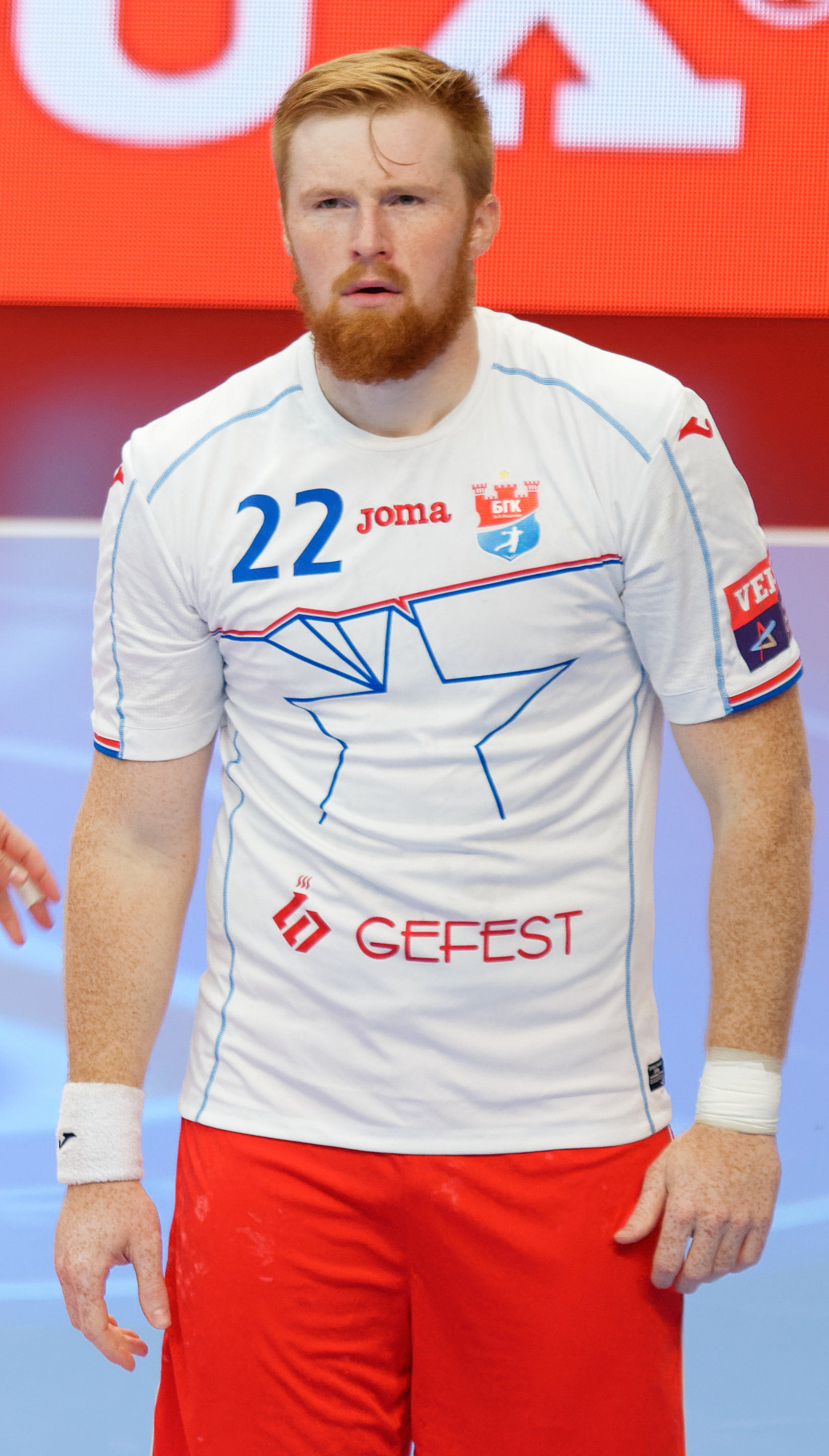

Personal information
- Nationality: Belarusian
- Born: 22 December 1988 (age 37) Brest, Belarus
- Height: 2.02 m (6 ft 8 in)

Sport
- Sport: Handball
- Position: Pivot
- Current club: HC Meshkov Brest
- Number: 22

Senior clubs
- Years: Team
- 2007–: HC Meshkov Brest
National team
Years	Team	Apps	(Gls)
2009–	Belarus	91	(44)

Viachaslau Shumak (born 22 December 1988) is a Belarusian handball player for HC Meshkov Brest and the Belarusian national team.
