= Denis Zabolotin =

Russian handball player

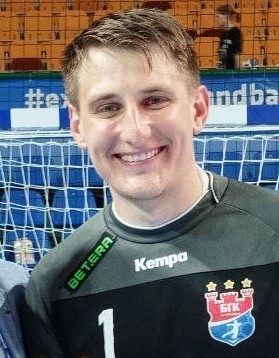

Personal information
- Nationality: Russian
- Born: 18 June 1998 (age 28) Krasnodar, Russia
- Height: 1.90 m (6 ft 3 in)

Sport
- Sport: Handball
- Position: Goalkeeper
- Current club: HC Meshkov Brest
- Number: 1

Senior clubs
- Years: Team
- 2015–2022: SKIF Krasnodar
- 2022–: HC Meshkov Brest
National team
Years	Team	Apps	(Gls)
2019–	Russia	5	(0)

Denis Zabolotin (born 18 June 1998) is a Russian handball player for HC Meshkov Brest and the Russian national team.

He represented Russia at the 2020 European Men's Handball Championship.
