= French Handball Federation =

National sporting association

French Handball Federation French: Fédération Française de Handball FFHB
- IOC nation: French Republic (FRA)
- Sport: Handball
- Other sports: Beach Handball; Wheelchair Handball
- Official website: ffhandball.fr

HISTORY
- Year of formation: 1 September 1941; 85 years ago

AFFILIATIONS
- International federation: International Handball Federation (IHF)
- IHF member since: 11 July 1946; 80 years ago
- Continental association: European Handball Federation
- National Olympic Committee: French National Olympic and Sports Committee
- Other affiliation(s): Mediterranean Handball Confederation; Ministry of Youth Affairs and Sports of France

GOVERNING BODY
- President: Philippe Bana

HEADQUARTERS
- Address: 16 Avenue Raspail, Gentilly Cedex
- Country: France
- Secretary General: Michel Godard

FINANCE
- Company status: Active
- Sponsors: Adidas; Groupe Caisse d'Épargne; Aosom; Lidl; Babybel; Eden Park; France Info; Butagaz; Betclic; Intersport; La Poste; Ici; Litremarché; La Boulangère; Groupe Millet; Préfon; Courtepaille; Optical Center; Acadomia; Quies; Molten Corporation; Gerflor

The French Handball Federation (French: Fédération Française de Handball) (FFHB) is the national handball association in France. Founded on 1 September 1941, FFHB organizes handball and beach handball within France and represents France internationally. It sorts under the French Ministry of Youth Affairs and Sports. The federation is a member of the European Handball Federation (EHF), Mediterranean Handball Confederation and the International Handball Federation (IHF). The current president of FFHB is Philippe Bana since 28 November 2020.

== FFHB Presidents ==
No.	Name	Tenure
1.	René Bouet	1941 – 1946
2.	Charles Petit-Montgobert	1946 – 1964
3.	Nelson Paillou	1964 – 1982
4.	Jean-Pierre Lacoux	1982 – 1996
5.	André Amiel	1996 – 2008
6.	Joël Delplanque	2008 – 2020
7.	Philippe Bana	2020 – present

== Club handball ==
The federation organizes the National League for club teams, and the French Cups for men and women (French: Coupe de France masculine and French: Coupe de France Féminine). The winners of these tournaments qualify for European Leagues and Cups — the EHF Men's Champions League and the EHF Women's Champions League, and the Men's EHF Cup Winners' Cup and Women's EHF Cup Winners' Cup.

== International handball ==
France hosted the men's World Championship in 1970, 2001 and 2017, and the women's World Championship in 2007.

=== The men's team ===
The men's national team is the current reigning Olympic Champion. It was the first team in the world to win the three titles in a row. It is widely regarded as the best current men's handball team in the world. The team has won the World Championship title six times, in 1995, 2001, 2009, 2011, 2015 and 2017 and the European Championship four times, in 2006, 2010, 2014 and 2024. The men's team won gold medals at the 2008 Summer Olympics in Beijing and 2012 Summer Olympics in London. Head coach for the men's national team is former player Talant Dujshebaev.

=== The women's team ===
The France women's national handball team were the world champions after their victory at the 2017 World Championships and reigning European champions after winning the 2018 European Championships. The team also won gold at the 2003 World Championships in Croatia, and at the 2023 World Championships. The team was placed fifth at the 2008 Summer Olympics in Beijing, but won gold in 2021.

Head coach for the women's national team is Sébastien Gardillou.

=== National youth teams ===
Team	Age group	Head coach	Competitions
Women	U20F : France women's national junior handball team	(France) Éric Baradat	W19 EHF EURO, Junior World Championship
Women	U18F : France women's national youth handball team	(France) Olivier De Lafuente (2016–)	W17 EHF EURO, Youth World Championship, EYOF
Women	U16F : France women's national under-16 handball team	(France) non permanent	European Open Handball Championship
Men	U21M : France men's national junior handball team	(France) Yohann Delattre	M20 EHF EURO, Junior World Championship
Men	U19M : France men's national youth handball team	(France) Franck Prouff (2023–)	M18 EHF EURO, Youth World Championship, EYOF
Men	U17M : France men's national under-17 handball team	(France) Guillaume Joli (2021–)	European Open Handball Championship

== Achievements ==
=== Men ===
- Olympic Games
  - (gold) Gold medal (3): 2008, 2012, 2020
  - (silver) Silver (1): 2016
  - (bronze) Bronze (1): 1992
  - 4th (1): 1996
- World Championship
  - (gold) Winner (6): 1995, 2001, 2009, 2011, 2015, 2017
  - (silver) 2nd (2): 1993, 2023
  - (bronze) 3rd (4): 1997, 2003, 2005, 2019, 2025
  - 4th (2): 2007, 2021
- European Championship
  - (gold) Winner (4): 2006, 2010, 2014, 2024
  - (bronze) 3rd (2): 2008, 2018
  - 4th (2): 2000, 2022
- Mediterranean Games
  - (silver) 2nd (2): 1987, 1993, 2009
  - (bronze) 3rd (1): 2001
  - 4th (1): 1979

=== Women ===
- Olympic Games
  - (gold) Gold medal (1): 2020
  - (silver) Silver (2): 2016, 2024
  - 4th (1): 2004
- World Championship
  - (gold) Winner (3): 2003, 2017, 2023
  - (silver) 2nd (4): 1999, 2009, 2011, 2021
- European Championship
  - (gold) Winner (1): 2018
  - (silver) 2nd (1): 2020
  - (bronze) 3rd (3): 2002, 2006, 2016
  - 4th (1): 2022
- Mediterranean Games
  - (gold) Winner (3): 1997, 2001, 2009
  - (silver) 2nd (3): 1987, 1991, 1993
  - 4th (1): 2005

=== Youth team: Men ===
- U21M
  - Junior World Championship
    - (gold) Winner (2): 2015, 2019
    - (bronze) 3rd (3): 1997, 2013, 2017
    - 4th (1): 1999
  - M20 EHF EURO
    - (silver) 2nd (1): 2018
    - (bronze) 3rd (2): 2008, 2016
    - 4th (1): 1996
- U19M
  - Youth World Championship
    - (gold) Winner (2): 2015, 2017
    - 4th (1): 2011
  - M18 EHF EURO
    - (gold) Winner (2): 2014, 2016

=== Youth team: Women ===
- U20F
  - Junior World Championship
    - (gold) Winner (1): 2024
    - (silver) 2nd (1): 2012
  - W19 EHF EURO
    - (gold) Winner (1): 2017
    - (bronze) 3rd (1): 2021
    - 4th (1): 2004
- U18F
  - Youth World Championship
    - 4th (3): 2006, 2008, 2010
  - W17 EHF EURO
    - (gold) Winner (2): 2007, 2023
    - (bronze) 3rd (2): 2005, 2019
    - 4th (2): 2009, 2017
  - European Youth Olympic Festival
    - (gold) Winner (1): 2023
