= HC Meshkov Brest =

Belarusian handball club

HC Myashkow Brest
- Full name: Брэсцкі гандбольны клуб імя А.П. Мяшкова (Brest Handball Club of A. P. Myashkow)
- Short name: HC Meshkov Brest
- Founded: 2002
- Arena: Universal Sports Complex Victoria
- Capacity: 3,740
- Head coach: (Serbia) Nenad Puljezević
- League: Belarusian First League of Handball; SEHA League
- 2025/26: 1st
- Club colours

HC Meshkov Brest (Myashkov Brest, officially A. P. Myashkow Brest Handball Club, Belarusian: Брэсцкі гандбольны клуб імя Мяшкова) is a professional handball club from Brest, Belarus. They currently compete in the Belarusian First League of Handball, in the SEHA League and competed in the EHF Champions League.

The club is named in honor of Anatol Piatrovich Myashkow (Meshkov), promoter of handball in Belarus and sports enthusiast.

== Accomplishments ==
- Belarusian First League
  - (gold) Champion (17x): 2004, 2005, 2006, 2007, 2008, 2014, 2015, 2016, 2017, 2018, 2019, 2020, 2021, 2022, 2023, 2024, 2026.
  - (silver) Runners-up (6x): 2003, 2009, 2010, 2011, 2012, 2025.
- Belarusian cup
  - (gold) Champion (15x): 2004, 2005, 2007, 2008, 2009, 2011, 2014, 2015, 2016, 2017, 2018, 2020, 2021, 2024, 2025.
- SEHA League
  - (gold) Champion (3х): 2023, 2024, 2026.

== Performance history ==
Season	BY Champ.	BY Cup	EHF Cup	EHF CL	Balkan HL	SEHA League
2025/2026	Gold medal	Silver medal				Gold medal
2024/2025	Silver medal	Gold medal				4
2023/2024	Gold medal	Gold medal				Gold medal
2022/2023	Gold medal	Silver medal				Gold medal
2021/2022	Gold medal	Bronze medal		Group Stage		1/4
2020/2021	Gold medal	Gold medal		Round of 8		4
2019/2020	Gold medal	Gold medal		Group stage		Bronze medal
2018/2019	Gold medal	Silver medal		Round of 16		Bronze medal
2017/2018	Gold medal	Gold medal		Round of 16		4
2016/2017	Gold medal	Gold medal		Round of 16		Bronze medal
2015/2016	Gold medal	Gold medal		Round of 16		4
2014/2015	Gold medal	Gold medal		Group stage		Silver medal
2013/2014	Gold medal	Gold medal	3 QS			Silver medal
2012/2013	Bronze medal	Silver medal	3 QS			4
2011/2012	Silver medal	Silver medal	Quarterfinals			
2010/2011	Silver medal	Gold medal	2 QS			
2009/2010	Silver medal	Silver medal	Round of 32			
2008/2009	Silver medal	Gold medal	Round of 32	QS	Bronze medal	
2007/2008	Gold medal	Gold medal		Group stage	Silver medal	
2006/2007	Gold medal	Gold medal		Group stage	Silver medal	
2005/2006	Gold medal	Silver medal		Group stage		
2004/2005	Gold medal	Gold medal		Group stage		
2003/2004	Gold medal	Gold medal	Round of 16			
2002/2003	Silver medal	Silver medal				

== Team ==
=== Current squad ===
Squad for the 2026–2027 season

Goalkeepers

- 1 (Russia) Denis Zabolotin
- 12 (Belarus) Ivan Matskevich
- 16 (Croatia) Filip Ivić

Left Wingers

- 14 (Belarus) Andrei Yurynok
- 35 (Belarus) Eduard Yarosh

Right Wingers

- 24 (Belarus) Maksim Baranau
- 27 (Russia) Aleksei Fokin
- 29 (Slovenia) Gal Marguč

Line players

- 22 (Belarus) Viachaslau Shumak
- 78 (Russia) Pavel Andreev
- 87 (Croatia) Gianfranco Pribetić
- 99 (Russia) Radomir Vrachevich

Left Backs

- 5 (Montenegro) Arsenije Dragašević
- 9 (Russia) Alexander Shkurinskiy
- 88 (Belarus) Artur Rudz

Central Backs

- 18 (Slovenia) Marko Matijaševič
- 19 (Slovakia) Martin Potisk

Right Backs

- 11 (Bosnia and Herzegovina) Neven Stjepanovic
- 31 (Belarus) Mikalai Aliokhin

=== Transfers ===
Transfers for the 2026–27 season

Joining

- (Slovenia) Gal Marguč (RW) from (Slovenia) RD Slovan
- (Croatia) Gianfranco Pribetić (LP) from (North Macedonia) GRK Ohrid

Leaving

- (Belarus) Yahor Budzeika (RB) to (Romania) CSM Vaslui
- (Montenegro) Vuk Lazović (P) (to ?)
- (Belarus) Valiantsin Kuran (CB) (to ?)

=== Transfer History ===
Transfers for the 2025–26 season

Joining

- (Croatia) Sandro Meštrić (GK) from (Poland) Industria Kielce
- (Slovakia) Martin Potisk (CB) from (Hungary) HE-DO B. Braun Gyöngyös
- (Russia) Aleksei Fokin (RW) from (Russia) HBC CSKA Moscow
- (Russia) Radomir Vrachevich (LP) from (Russia) Viktor Stavropol
- (Belarus) Mikalai Aliokhin (RB) from (Romania) CSM Constanța
- (Belarus) Artur Rudz (LB) (from (Russia) HBC CSKA Moscow)

Leaving

- (Austria) Boris Zivkovic (RB) to (France) C' Chartres MHB
- (Belarus) Andrei Chmel (GK) (to (Belarus) Kronon Grodno)
- (Montenegro) Božo Anđelić (CB) (to ?)
- (Belarus) Aliaksandr Padshyvalau (CB) (to (Belarus) SKA Minsk)
- (Belarus) Aliaksandr Lukashevich (RW) (to ?)
- (Belarus) Mikhail Zhyla (P) (to ?)
- (Croatia) Sandro Meštrić (GK) to (Croatia) RK Zagreb

== Notable players ==
- (Belarus) Денис Волынцев
- (Belarus) Ilya Tamashuk
- (Belarus) Valentin Silko
- (Belarus) Hleb Harbuz
- (Belarus) Andrej Jaščanka
- (Belarus) Aliaksandr Bachko
- (Belarus) Artyom Selvesyuk
- (Belarus) Aliaksei Shynkel
- (Belarus) Dmitry Potocki
- (Belarus) Andrey krainov
- (Belarus) Kirill Knyazev
- (Belarus) Dzianis Rutenka
- (Belarus) Danila Vergeichik
- (Belarus) Vladimir Galushko
- (Belarus) Vladimir khuzeev
- (Belarus) Vasily Ostrovsky
- (Belarus) Maxim nekhaychik
- (Belarus) Andrey mochalov
- (Belarus) Ilya Usik
- (Belarus) Roman Kolesnev
- (Belarus) Aliaksei Ushal
- (Belarus) Anton Prakapenia
- (Belarus) Vitali Charapenka
- (Belarus) Yuri Gromyko
- (Belarus) Artsiom Kulak
- (Belarus) Aleh Astrashapkin
- (Belarus) Mikhail Zhyla
- (Belarus) Aliaksandr Lukashevich
- (Belarus) Andrei Chmel
- (Belarus) Yahor Budzeika
- (Belarus) Valiantsin Kuran
- (Belarus) Ivan Matskevich
- (Belarus) Viachaslau Saldatsenka
- (Belarus) Eduard Yarosh
- (Belarus) Andrei Yurynok
- (Belarus) Mikita Vailupau
- (Belarus) Maksim Baranau
- (Belarus) Dzmitry Kamyshyk
- (Belarus) Dzmitry Nikulenkau
- (Belarus) Siarhei Shylovich
- (Belarus) Mikalai Aliokhin
- (Belarus) Viachaslau Shumak
- (Belarus) Maxim Babichev
- Mikail Usachov, playing for Brest scored 15 goals in a EHF CL game in 2005/06 which was a record at the time
- (Ukraine) Aleksandr Kirilenko
- (Ukraine) Vladyslav Ostroushko
- (Ukraine) Konstantin Kurylenko
- (Bosnia and Herzegovina) Ivan Karačić
- (Bosnia and Herzegovina) Vladimir Vranješ
- (Bosnia and Herzegovina) Marko Panić
- (Croatia) Sandro Obranović
- (Croatia) Šime Ivić
- (Croatia) Vladimir Božić
- (Croatia) Ivan Pešić
- (Croatia) Ljubo Vukić
- (Croatia) Robert Markotić
- (Czech Republic) Stanislav Kašpárek
- (Czech Republic) Pavel Horák (handballer)
- (France) William Accambray
- (France) Baptiste Bonnefond
- (Lithuania) Vaidotas Grosas
- (Lithuania) Nerijus Atajevas
- (Latvia) Dainis Kristopans
- (Montenegro) Rade Mijatović
- (Montenegro) Božo Anđelić
- (Montenegro) Vuk Lazović
- (Russia) Mikhail Revin
- (Russia) Konstantin Igropulo
- (Russia) Grigory Blagonadezhdin
- (Russia) Dmitrii Santalov
- (Russia) Andrey Filippov
- (Russia) Yuri Tatar
- (Russia) Denis Zabolotin
- (Russia) Alexander Shkurinskiy
- (Russia) Pavel Atman
- (Russia) Pavel Bashkin
- (Russia) Pavel Andreev
- (Slovenia) Deyan Chanchar
- (Slovenia) Vid Poteko
- (Slovenia) David Špiler
- (Slovenia) Simon Razgor
- (Slovenia) Jaka Malus
- (Slovenia) Staš Skube
- (Serbia) (Montenegro) Branko Kankaraš
- (Serbia) Rajko Prodanović
- (Serbia) Nemanja Obradović (handballer)
- (Serbia) Nikola Manojlović (handballer)
- (Serbia) Stevan Sretenović
- (Serbia) Filip Šćepanović
- (Serbia) Petar Đorđić
- (Serbia) Darko Stevanović
- (Serbia) Milan Đukić (handballer)
- (Serbia) Darko Đukić
- (Serbia) Miloš Kostadinović
- (Serbia) Rastko Stojković
- (Austria) Janko Božović
- (Austria) Boris Zivkovic
- (Denmark) Henrik Knudsen
- (Iran) (Hungary) Iman Jamali
- (Poland) Daniel Żółtak
- (Poland) Paweł Paczkowski
- (Spain) Alexander Tyumentsev
- (Germany) Daniel Andreev
- (North Macedonia) Radoslav Stojanović (handball)
- (North Macedonia) Lazo Majnov
- (China) Zhang Jianjie
- (Egypt) Youssef Ahmed Hassan

== Notable former coaches ==
- (Lithuania) Gintaras Savukynas
- (Croatia) Željko Babić
- (Ukraine) Serhiy Bebeshko
- (Spain) Manolo Cadenas
- (Spain) Raúl Alonso
- (Russia) Eduard Koksharov
