= Ivan Matskevich =

Belarusian handball player

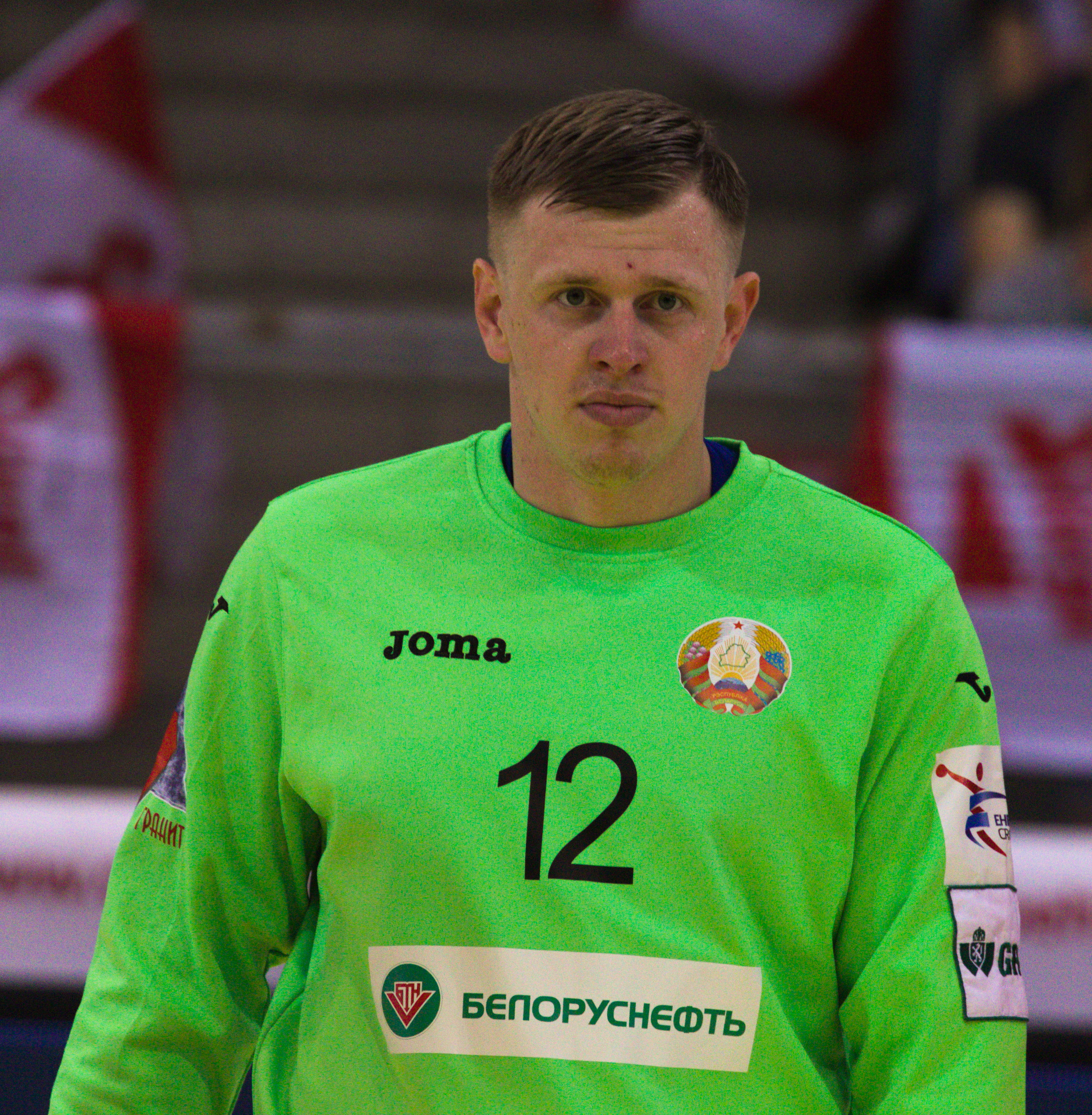

Personal information
- Nationality: Belarusian
- Born: 8 May 1991 (age 35) Lepiel, Belarus
- Height: 1.93 m (6 ft 4 in)

Sport
- Sport: Handball
- Position: Goalkeeper
- Current club: HC Meshkov Brest
- Number: 12

Senior clubs
- Years: Team
- –2011: HPC Arkatron
- 2011–2015: SKA Minsk
- 2015–2017: Steaua București
- 2017–2022: HC Meshkov Brest
- 2022–2023: AEK Athens
- 2024–: HC Meshkov Brest
National team
Years	Team	Apps	(Gls)
–	Belarus	85	(5)

Ivan Matskevich (born 8 May 1991) is a Belarusian professional handball player who plays as a goalkeeper for HC Meshkov Brest and the Belarusian national team.

== Career ==
Ivan signed a two-year contract, starting next season, with AEK Athens handball club of the Greek Handball Championship on March 19, 2022.
