= Sergey Kudinov =

Russian handball player

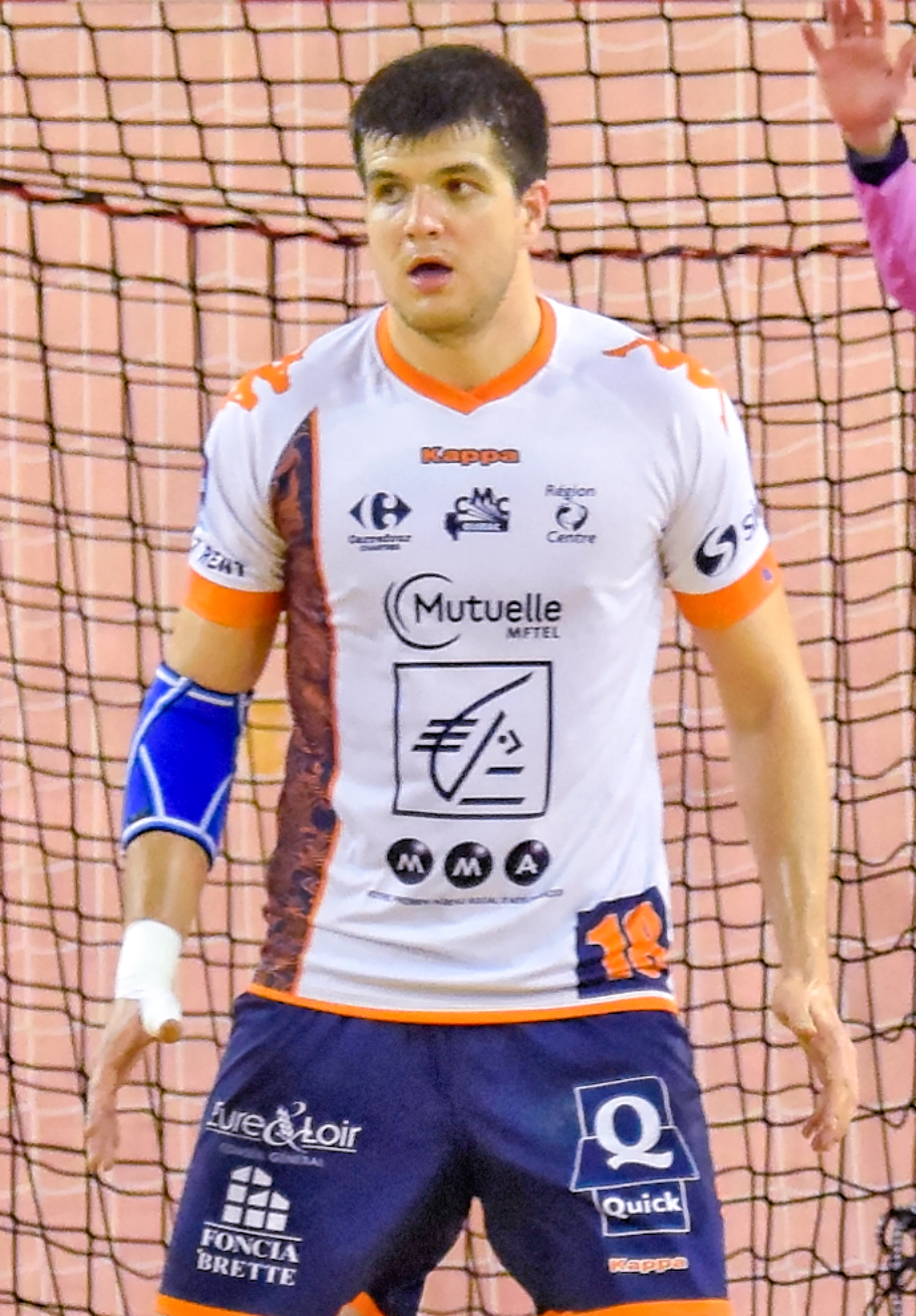

Personal information
- Full name: Sergey Vassilyevich Kudinov
- Nationality: Russian
- Born: 29 June 1991 (age 35) Astrakhan, Russia
- Height: 1.95 m (6 ft 5 in)

Sport
- Sport: Handball
- Position: Left back
- Current club: C' Chartres MHB
- Number: 18

Youth career
- Years: Team
- –1997: US Ivry Handball
- 1997–2000: VfL Hameln
- 2000–2001: SC Magdeburg
- 2001–2009: Dynamo Astrakhan

Senior clubs
- Years: Team
- 2009–2014: Dynamo Astrakhan
- 2013–: C' Chartres MHB
National team
Years	Team	Apps	(Gls)
2013–	Russia	46	(39)
- Updated on 29 September 2022

Sergey Vassilyevich Kudinov (Russian: Сергей Васильевич Кудинов, born 29 June 1991) is a Russian handball player for C' Chartres MHB and the Russian national team.

He represented Russia at the 2015 World Men's Handball Championship.

His father Vasily Kudinov was also a handball player.
