= Mikalai Aliokhin =

Belarusian handball player

Personal information
- Nationality: Belarusian
- Born: 9 April 1998 (age 28) Novopolotsk, Belarus
- Height: 1.90 m (6 ft 3 in)

Sport
- Sport: Handball
- Position: Right back
- Current club: HC Meshkov Brest
- Number: 31
National team
Years	Team	Apps	(Gls)
–	Belarus	8	(11)

Mikalai Aliokhin (born 9 April 1998) is a Belarusian handball player for HC Meshkov Brest and the Belarusian national team.

He participated at the 2018 European Men's Handball Championship.
