= Janko Božović =

Austrian handball player (born 1985)

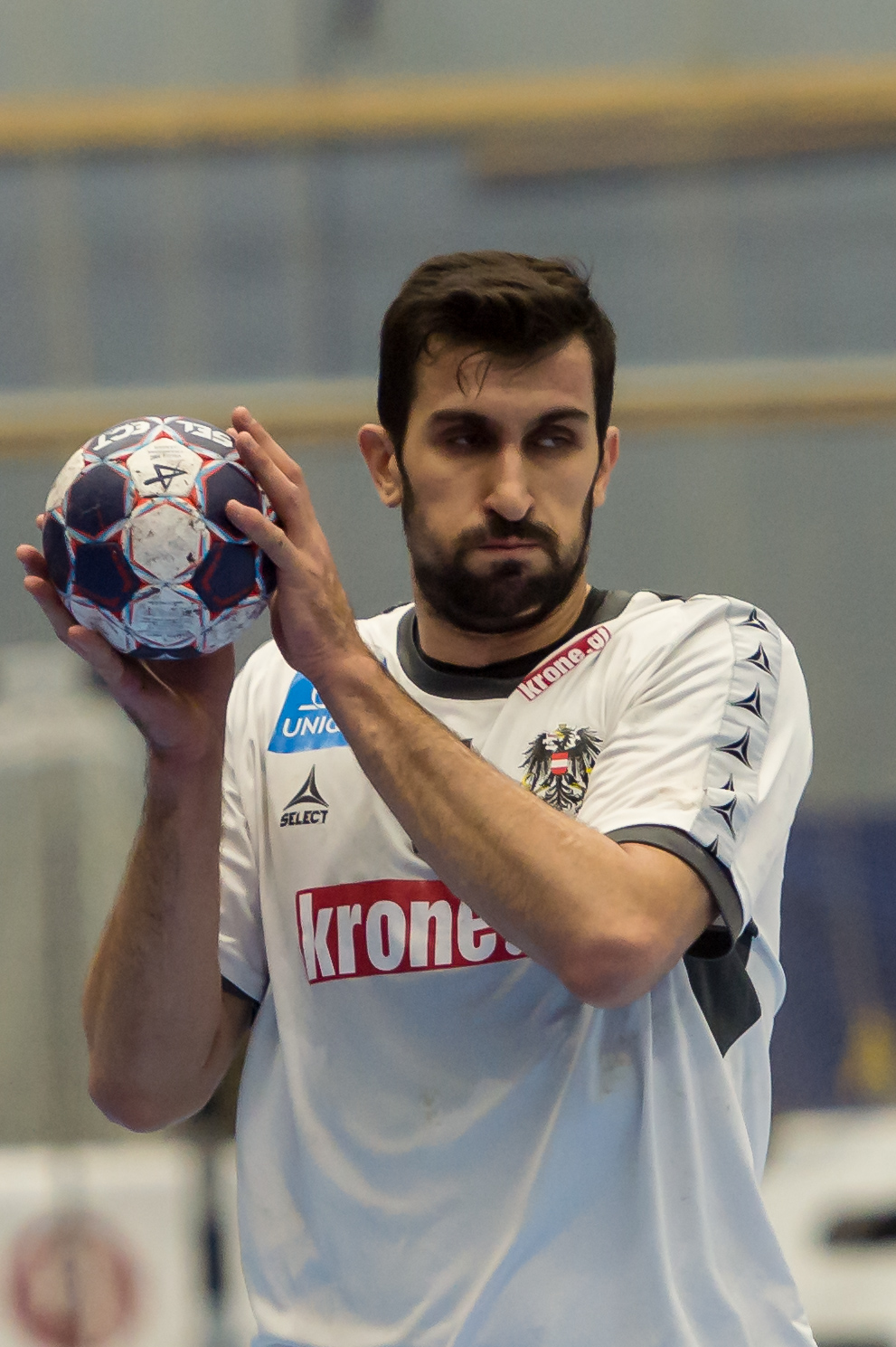

Personal information
- Nationality: Austrian
- Born: 14 July 1985 (age 41) Bar, Montenegro
- Height: 2.04 m (6 ft 8 in)

Sport
- Sport: Handball
- Position: Right back
- Current club: Al-Sulaibikhat
- Number: 77

Senior clubs
- Years: Team
- 2001–2006: SG West Wien
- 2006: Nit-Hak
- 2006–2007: OAR La Coruña
- 2007–2008: Füchse Berlin
- 2008: Dunaferr SE
- 2008–2009: Italgest Casarano
- 2009–2011: RD Slovan
- 2011: TSG Friesenheim
- 2011–2014: TV Emsdetten
- 2014–2015: HC Meshkov Brest
- 2015–2016: RK Metalurg Skopje
- 2016: → Al Rayyan (loan)
- 2016–2018: Sporting CP
- 2018–2019: TV Emsdetten
- 2019–2022: VfL Gummersbach
National team
| Years | Team | Apps | (Gls) |
| 2006– | Austria | 155 | (427) |

Janko Božović (born 14 July 1985) is an Austrian handball player for Al-Sulaibikhat and the Austrian national team.

He is the son of former Austrian handballplayer Stanka Bozovic.
