= Andrei Yurynok =

Belarusian handball player

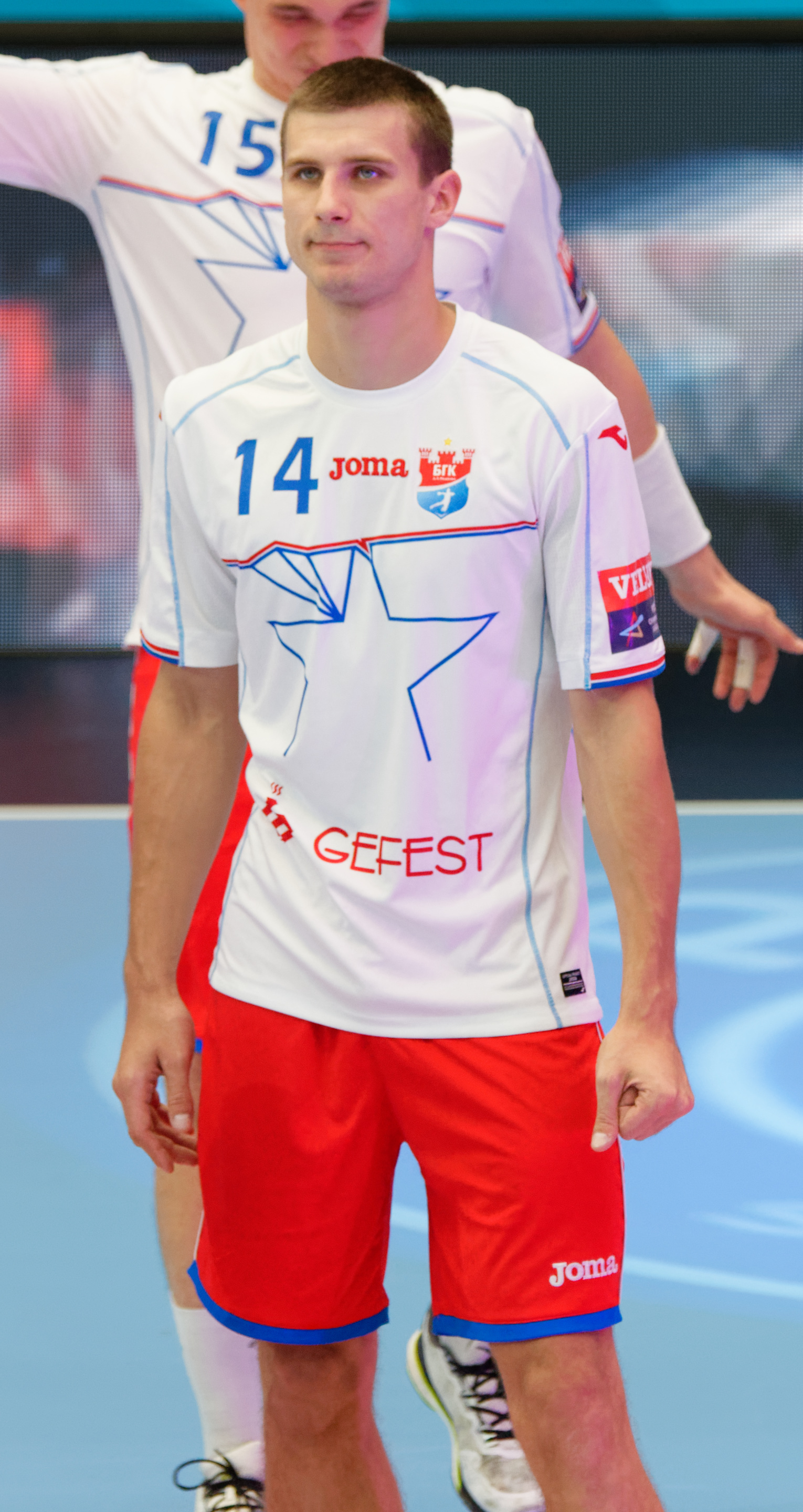

Personal information
- Nationality: Belarusian
- Born: 21 September 1996 (age 30) Brest, Belarus
- Height: 1.90 m (6 ft 3 in)

Sport
- Sport: Handball
- Position: Left wing
- Current club: HC Meshkov Brest
- Number: 14

Senior clubs
- Years: Team
- –2015: Vityaz Minsk
- 2015–: HC Meshkov Brest
- 2015–2016: → SKA Minsk (loan)
National team
Years	Team	Apps	(Gls)
2013–	Belarus	80	(209)

Andrei Yurynok (born 21 September 1996) is a Belarusian handball player for HC Meshkov Brest and the Belarusian national team.

He competed at the 2016 European Men's Handball Championship.
