= Boris Zivkovic (handballer) =

Austrian handball player (born 1992)

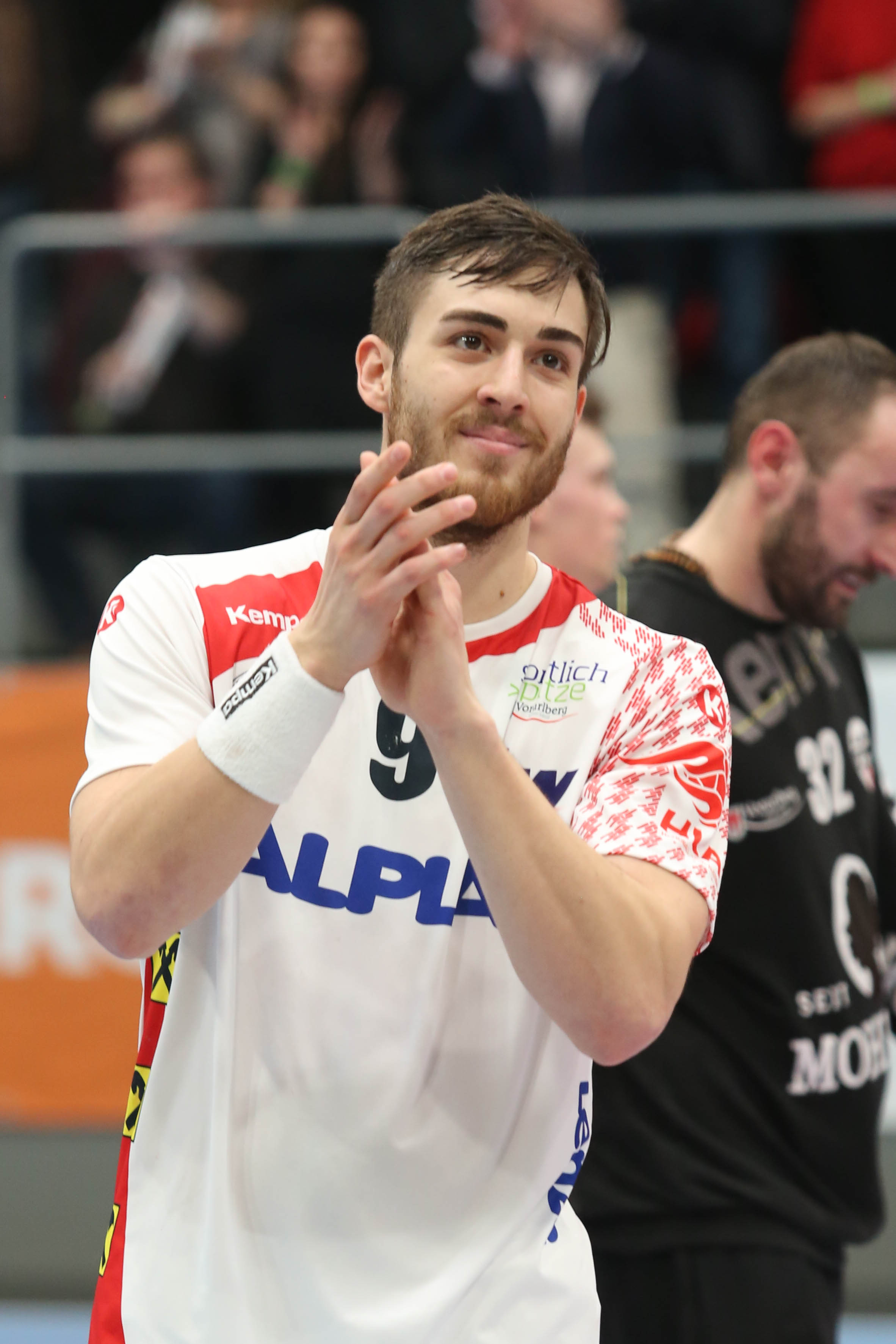

Personal information
- Nationality: Austrian
- Born: 2 May 1992 (age 34) Bregenz, Austria
- Height: 1.95 m (6 ft 5 in)

Sport
- Sport: Handball
- Position: Right back
- Current club: C' Chartres MHB
- Number: 9

Senior clubs
- Years: Team
- 2011–2021: Alpla HC Hard
- 2021–02/2024: KS Azoty-Puławy
- 2024: SG Flensburg-Handewitt
- 2024–03/2025: Al-Qurain
- 2025: HC Meshkov Brest
- 2025–: C' Chartres MHB
National team
Years	Team	Apps	(Gls)
2014–	Austria	60	(122)

Boris Zivkovic (born 2 May 1992) is an Austrian handball player for C' Chartres MHB and the Austrian national team.

He represented Austria at the 2019 World Men's Handball Championship.
