= C' Chartres Métropole Handball =

French handball club

C' Chartres MHB
- Full name: C' Chartres Métropole Handball
- Short name: C'CMHB
- Founded: 1969; 57 years ago
- Arena: Halle Jean-Cochet, Chartres
- Capacity: 1,200
- President: Steeve Baron
- Head coach: Nebojša Stojinović
- League: LNH Division 1
- 2024–25: LNH Division 1, 14th of 16
- Club colours
Home	Away

C' Chartres Métropole Handball is a professional handball club from Chartres, France. Currently, the team competes in the French First League of Handball.

Location of C' Chartres Métropole Handball

== Crest, colours, supporters ==
=== Naming history ===
Name	Period
CS Mainvilliers HB	1969–2004
Mainvilliers-Chartres HB	2004–2008
Chartres Mainvilliers HB	2008–2012
Chartres Métropole HB 28	2012–2018
C' Chartres Métropole HB	2018–present

=== Kit manufacturers ===
Period	Kit manufacturer
2014	(Denmark) Hummel
2014 - 2020	(Italy) Kappa
2020–present	(Denmark) Hummel

=== Kits ===
HOME
2018-19	2020-21	2021-22	2023-24

AWAY
2020-21	2023-24

== Sports Hall information ==
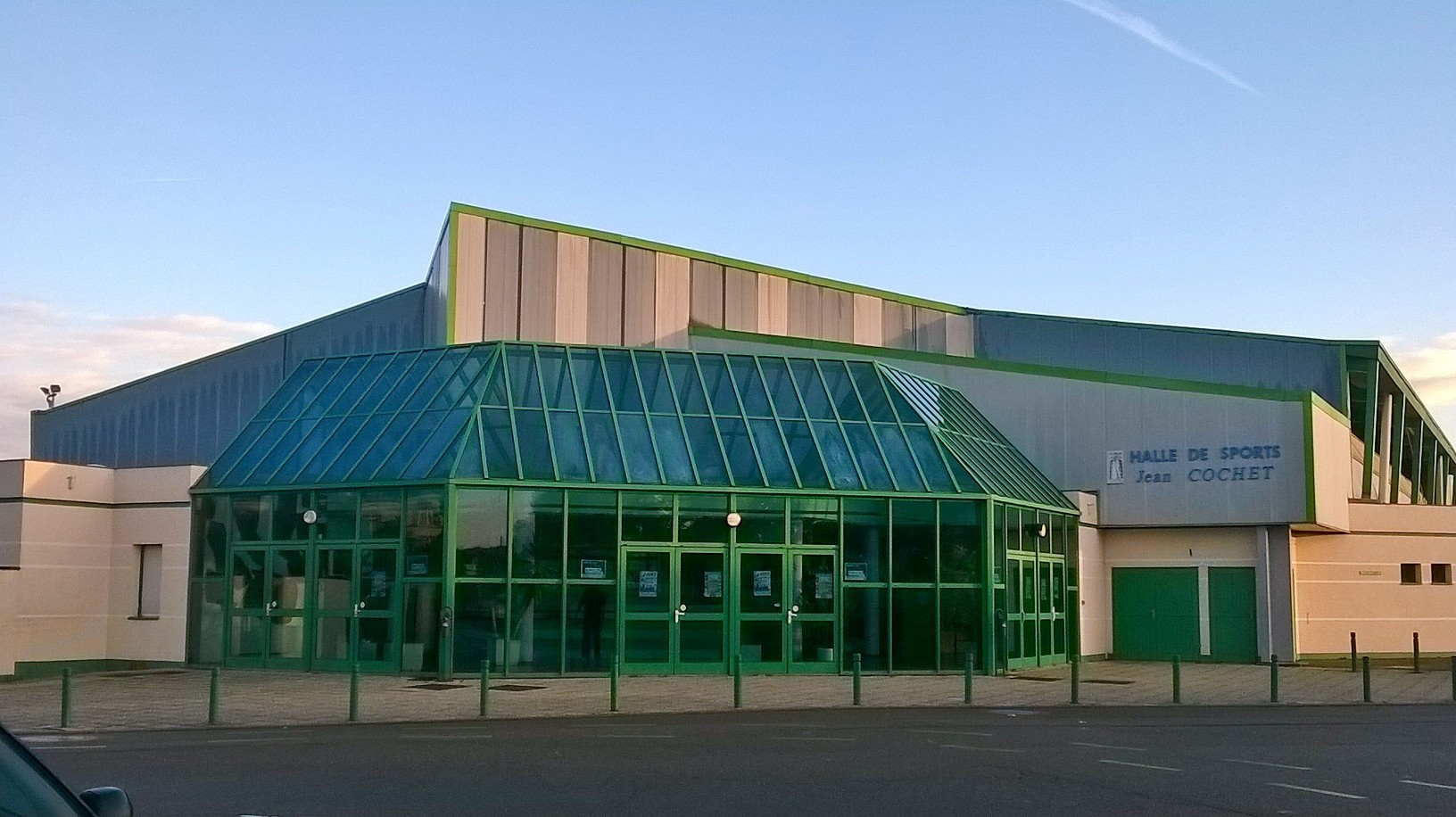
Home hall: Halle Jean-Cochet

- Name: – Halle Jean-Cochet
- City: – Chartres
- Capacity: – 1200
- Address: – 6 Rue Jean Monnet, 28000 Chartres, France

== Team ==
=== Current squad ===
Squad for the 2023–24 season

Goalkeepers

- 1 (France) Tom Dufour
- 44 (Bosnia and Herzegovina) Zoran Radić
- 99 (Serbia) Milan Bomaštar

Left Wingers

- 3 (Serbia) Vanja Ilić
- 92 (France) Nael Tighiouart
- 96 (France) Gaël Tribillon

Right Wingers

- 19 (Bulgaria) Svetlin Dimitrov
- 24 (France) Valentin Bzdynga

Line players

- 7 (Spain) Adrià Figueras
- 69 (France) Hugo Jund

Left Backs

- 20 (Serbia) Ilija Abutović
- 95 (Belarus) Vadim Gayduchenko
- 97 (France) Yvan Verin

Central Backs

- 8 (Serbia) Aleksa Kolaković
- 18 (Russia) Sergey Kudinov
- 23 (Portugal) Wilson Davyes

Right Backs

- 14 (Slovenia) Matic Grošelj
- 33 (Ukraine) Sergiy Onufriyenko

=== Transfers ===
Transfers for the 2026–27 season

Joining

- (Tunisia) Oussama Hosni (RB) from (North Macedonia) RK Eurofarm Pelister
- (Tunisia) (France) Mehdi Harbaoui (GK) from (France) US Dunkerque HB
- (Cape Verde) (Portugal) Edmilson Araújo (LB) from (France) Istres Provence Handball
- (Portugal) André José (CB) from (Portugal) ABC Braga
- (Ukraine) Oleksandr Onufriienko (LP) from (Slovenia) RK Celje
- (France) Édouard Kempf (RW) from (France) Fenix Toulouse Handball
- (France) Gabin Martinez (RB) from (France) US Dunkerque HB
- (France) Nael Tighiouart (LW) back from loan at (France) Pontault-Combault Handball

Leaving

- (Austria) Boris Zivkovic (RB) to (Switzerland) HC Arbon
- (Serbia) Vanja Ilić (LW) to (France) Pays d'Aix Université Club
- (Serbia) Milan Bomaštar (GK) to (North Macedonia) RK Vardar
- (Cape Verde) (Portugal) Paulo Moreno (LP) to (Spain) BM Nava
- (Brazil) Vinícios Carvalho (RB) to (Romania) Dinamo București
- (Slovenia) Peter Šiško (LB) to (Slovenia) RK Trimo Trebnje
- (Spain) Eduardo Cadarso (CB) to (Italy) Cassano Magnago HC
- (France) Youenn Cardinal (RW) to (Switzerland) CS Chênois Genève Handball
- (France) Jason Muel (LP) to (France) Handball Club Cournon d'Auvergne

=== Transfer History ===
Transfers for the 2025–26 season

Joining

- (Austria) Boris Zivkovic (RB) from (Belarus) HC Meshkov Brest
- (Slovenia) Sebastian Skube (CB) from (France) Chambéry SMBH
- (Slovenia) Peter Šiško (LB) from (Poland) Wisła Płock
- (France) Julien Meyer (GK) from (Switzerland) Kadetten Schaffhausen
- (France) Youenn Cardinal (RW) from (France) Cesson Rennes MHB
- (France) Jason Muel (LP) from (France) US Créteil Handball
- (France) Julien Luciani (LP) from (France) Pontault-Combault Handball

Leaving

- (Spain) Adrià Figueras (LP) to (Spain) BM Granollers
- (Slovenia) Nik Henigman (LB) to (North Macedonia) RK Eurofarm Pelister
- (Slovenia) Matic Grošelj (RB) to (France) Chambéry SMBH
- (Portugal) Manuel Gaspar (GK) to (France) US Ivry Handball
- (Hungary) Hunor Hermann (CB) to (Hungary) Dabas KK
- (France) Hugo Jund (LP) to (France) Fenix Toulouse Handball
- (France) Valentin Bzdynga (RW) to (Belgium) Initia HC Hasselt
- (France) Nael Tighiouart (LW) on loan at (France) Pontault-Combault Handball

== Former club members ==
=== Notable former players ===
- (France) Maxime Cherblanc (2008-2016)
- (France) Grégoire Detrez (2017–2018)
- (France) Samuel Foucault (2009-2016)
- (France) Julien Meyer (2021-)
- (France) Quentin Minel (2006-2009)
- (France) Robin Molinié (2012-2019)
- (France) Sébastien Mongin (2012–2015)
- (France) Alric Monnier (2008-2017)
- (France) Zacharia N'Diaye (2015-2021)
- (France) Sébastien Ostertag (2012-2015)
- (France) Émeric Paillasson (2011-2016)
- (France) Yohann Ploquin (2015-2016)
- (France) Valentin Porte (2006-2008)
- (France) Raoul Prandi (2003-2009)
- (Algeria) Yacinn Bouakaz (2011–2014)
- (Bosnia and Herzegovina) Edin Bašić (2017-2018)
- (Bosnia and Herzegovina) Nebojša Grahovac (2013-)
- (Brazil) Leonardo Domenech de Almeida (2019–2021)
- (Canada) Alexis Bertrand (2010–2011)
- (Chile) Rodrigo Salinas Muñoz (2016-2017)
- (Denmark) Kim Sonne-Hansen (2019-2021)
- (Democratic Republic of the Congo) Aurélien Tchitombi (2018–2020)
- (Spain) Adrià Figueras (2021-)
- (Moldova) Ghennadii Solomon (2007-2014)
- (Romania) Dan Racoțea (2019-2020)
- (Russia) Sergey Kudinov (2014-)
- (Russia) Alexander Pyshkin (2015–2016)
- (Slovenia) Matic Grošelj (2021-)
- (Slovenia) Borut Oslak (2013-2016)
- (Serbia) Davor Čutura (2015-2016)
- (Serbia) Saša Mitrović (2006-2014)
- (Slovakia) Lukáš Urban (2020-2021)
- (Tunisia) Mourad Khabir (2005-2013)
- (Tunisia) Wael Jallouz (2019-2020)
- (Turkey) Can Çelebi (2015–2016)
- (Ukraine) Sergiy Onufriyenko (2018-)

=== Former coaches ===
Seasons	Coach	Country
1998-2013	Benoit Guillaume	(France)
2013-2015	Pascal Mahé	(France)
2015-2018	Jérémy Roussel	(France)
2018-2019	Jérôme Delarue	(France)
2019-2023	Toni Gerona	(Spain)
2023-	Nebojša Stojinović	(Serbia)
