= Pavel Andreev (handballer) =

Russian handball player

Personal information
- Nationality: Russian
- Born: 19 July 1992 (age 34) Saint Petersburg, Russia
- Height: 1.94 m (6 ft 4 in)

Sport
- Sport: Handball
- Position: Pivot
- Current club: HC Meshkov Brest
- Number: 78

Senior clubs
- Years: Team
- 2014–2022: Chekhovskiye Medvedi
- 2022–2023: RK Vardar 1961
- 2022–2023: → HC Meshkov Brest
- 2023–: HC Meshkov Brest
National team
Years	Team	Apps	(Gls)
2019–	Russia	3	(4)

Pavel Andreev (born 19 July 1992) is a Russian handball player for HC Meshkov Brest and the Russian national team.

He represented Russia at the 2020 European Men's Handball Championship.
