= Adrià Figueras =

Spanish handball player (born 1988)

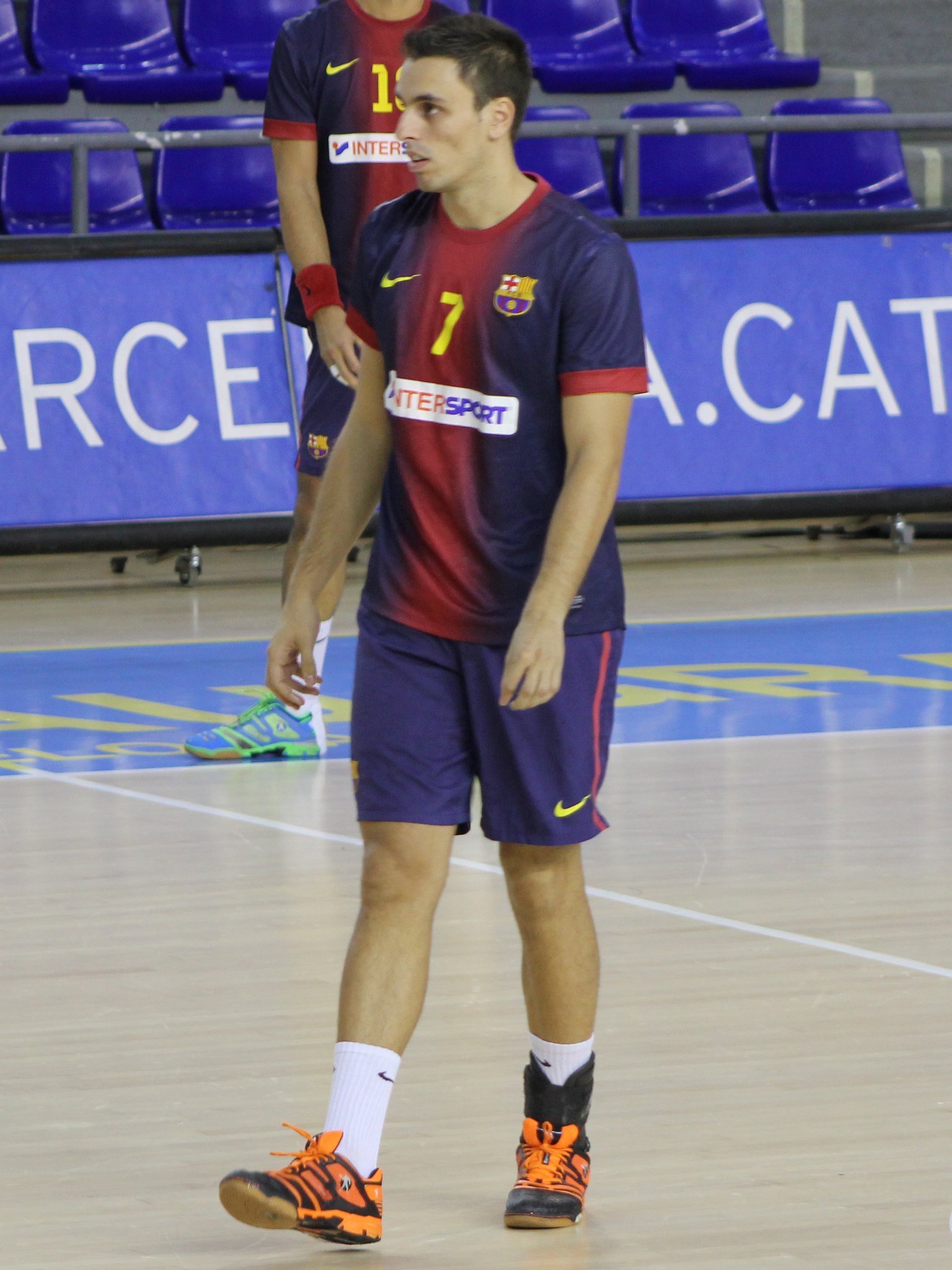
- Figueras in 2012

Personal information
- Full name: Adrià Figueras Trejo
- Nationality: Spanish
- Born: 31 August 1988 (age 38) Barcelona, Spain
- Height: 1.92 m (6 ft 4 in)

Sport
- Sport: Handball
- Position: Pivot
- Current club: C' Chartres MHB

Senior clubs
- Years: Team
- 2013–2014: FC Barcelona
- 2014–2020: BM Granollers
- 2020–2021: HBC Nantes
- 2021–: C' Chartres MHB
National team
| Years | Team | Apps | (Gls) |
| 2016– | Spain | 134 | (349) |
Medal record
Olympic Games
| Bronze medal – third place | 2020 Tokyo | Team |
| Bronze medal – third place | 2024 Paris | Team |
World Championship
| Bronze medal – third place | 2021 Egypt |
| Bronze medal – third place | 2023 Poland/Sweden |
European Championship
| Gold medal – first place | 2018 Croatia |
| Gold medal – first place | 2020 Sweden/Austria/Norway |
| Silver medal – second place | 2022 Hungary/Slovakia |
Mediterranean Games
| Bronze medal – third place | 2018 Tarragona | Team |
- Updated on 14 September 2024

Adrià Figueras Trejo (Note: In this Spanish name, the first or paternal surname is Figueras and the second or maternal family name is Trejo.) (born 31 August 1988) is a Spanish handball player for C' Chartres MHB and the Spanish team.

He participated at the 2017 World Men's Handball Championship.

== Individual awards ==
- Liga ASOBAL MVP: 2016 and 2018
- Liga ASOBAL All-Team: 2016, 2017 and 2018
