= Melwin Beckman =

Polish handball player (born 2000)

Personal information
- Nationality: Polish, Swedish
- Born: 5 August 2000 (age 26) Kungsbacka, Sweden
- Height: 1.98 m (6 ft 6 in)

Sport
- Sport: Handball
- Position: Left back
- Current club: HK Aranäs
- Number: 19

Senior clubs
- Years: Team
- 2017–: HK Aranäs
National team
Years	Team	Apps	(Gls)
2021–	Poland	9	(14)
- Updated on 28 December 2022

Melwin Beckman (born 5 August 2000) is a Swedish-Polish handball player for Club Sport Maritimo and the Polish national team. Born in Sweden to one Polish and one Swedish parent, he obtained Polish national citizenship in 2019.

He started his career at Swedish club HK Aranäs in 2017. In 2018 he was promoted with the club to the top league in Sweden, the Handbollsligan.

He debuted for the Polish national team against Sweden on 4 November 2021. He represented Poland at the 2022 European Championship.
