= Domen Makuc =

Slovenian professional handball player (born 2000)

Personal information
- Nationality: Slovenian
- Born: 1 July 2000 (age 26) Postojna, Slovenia
- Height: 1.88 m (6 ft 2 in)

Sport
- Sport: Handball
- Position: Centre back
- Current club: THW Kiel
- Number: 35

Youth career
- Years: Team
- –2009: RK Gold Club
- 2009–2015: RK Jadran Hrpelje-Kozina
- 2015–2016: RK Celje

Senior clubs
- Years: Team
- 2016–2020: RK Celje
- 2020–2026: FC Barcelona
- 2026–: THW Kiel
National team
Years	Team	Apps	(Gls)
2021–	Slovenia	42	(143)
- Updated on 24 January 2026

Domen Makuc (born 1 July 2000) is a Slovenian handball player who plays as a centre back for FC Barcelona and the Slovenia national team. He participated at the 2023 World Men's Handball Championship.

== Career ==
In playing for RK Celje in the 2016–17 EHF Champions League, Makuc became the first player born in the twenty-first century to feature in the competition. That same year, he became the first born in the twenty-first century to score in it. After signing with Barça, he was awarded the player of the match award on his debut in a victory over BM Benidorm in the Supercopa ASOBAL. He made his international debut for Slovenia against the Netherlands in 2021. Makuc was the top scorer in a key 2022–23 EHF Champions League group match against THW Kiel. Considered one of the best young players in the world, he has been compared to his idol, Ivano Balic. Makuc was expected to play a significant role for Barça ahead of the 2023–24 season following the departure of Luka Cindrić, but suffered a serious knee injury in pre-season Makuc missed the 2024 European Men's Handball Championship as a result.

== Honours ==
=== Celje ===
- Slovenian First League
  - Winner: 2016–17, 2017–18, 2018–19, 2019–20
- Slovenian Cup
  - Winner: 2015–16, 2016–17, 2017–18
- Slovenian Supercup
  - Winner: 2016, 2017, 2019
  - Runner-up: 2018

=== Barcelona ===
- EHF Champions League
  - Winner: 2020–21, 2021–22, 2023–24, 2025–26
  - Runner-up: 2019–20
- Liga ASOBAL
  - Winner: 2020–21, 2021–22, 2022–23, 2023–24, 2024–25, 2025–26
- Copa del Rey
  - Winner: 2020–21, 2021–22, 2022–23, 2023–24, 2024–25, 2025–26
- Copa ASOBAL
  - Winner: 2020–21, 2021–22, 2022–23, 2023–24, 2024–25
- Supercopa ASOBAL
  - Winner: 2020–21, 2021–22
- Iberian Supercup
  - Winner: 2022, 2023, 2024
- Catalan Super Cup
  - Winner: 2020, 2021, 2022, 2023, 2024

=== Individual honours ===
- EHF Excellence Awards: Rookie of the Season 2022/23
