= Gonzalo Pérez de Vargas =

Spanish handball player (born 1991)

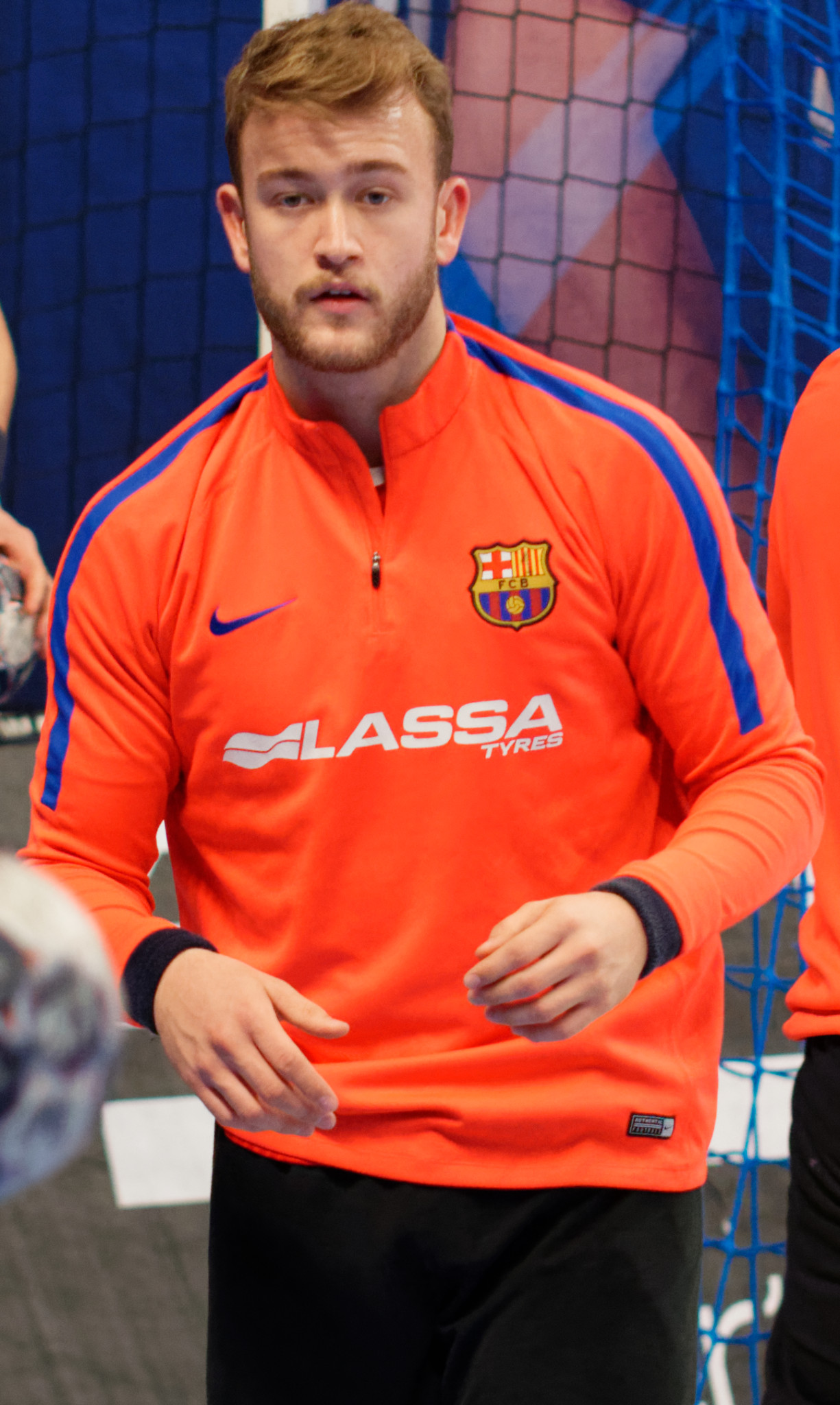
- Vargas in 2016

Personal information
- Full name: Gonzalo Pérez de Vargas Moreno
- Nationality: Spanish
- Born: 10 January 1991 (age 35) Toledo, Spain
- Height: 1.89 m (6 ft 2 in)

Sport
- Sport: Handball
- Position: Goalkeeper
- Current club: THW Kiel
- Number: 1

Senior clubs
- Years: Team
- 2009–2025: FC Barcelona
- 2011–2013: → BM Granollers (loan)
- 2013–2014: → Fenix Toulouse (loan)
- 2025–: THW Kiel
National team
Years	Team	Apps	(Gls)
2012–	Spain	193	(18)
Medal record
Olympic Games
Bronze medal – third place	2020 Tokyo	Team
Bronze medal – third place	2024 Paris	Team
World Championship
Bronze medal – third place	2021 Egypt
Bronze medal – third place	2023 Poland/Sweden
European Championship
Gold medal – first place	2018 Croatia
Gold medal – first place	2020 Sweden/Austria/Norway
Silver medal – second place	2016 Poland
Silver medal – second place	2022 Hungary/Slovakia
Bronze medal – third place	2014 Denmark
- Updated on 13 January 2025

Gonzalo Pérez de Vargas Moreno (born 10 January 1991) is a Spanish professional handball player for THW Kiel and the Spanish national team.

== Career ==
Vargas started playing handball at his hometown club Amibal Toledo. In 2007, he switched to FC Barcelona Handbol. In the 2010/2011, he won the treble with the club, with the Spanish championship, Copa del Rey and EHF Champions League.

For the 2011/2012 season, he joined league rivals BM Granollers. Two years after he joined French side Fenix Toulouse Handball on a three year deal.

For the 2014/2015 season, he returned to FC Barcelona to replace Arpad Šterbik.

In 2017/18 season he set a record for most goals scored by a goalkeeper in a EHF Champions League season with 6 goals which he improved to 7 goals in 2020/21 season.

In February 2025, he tore his cruciate ligament which has kept him out for the rest of the season. To replace him Barcelona signed Vincent Gerard, who came out of retirement to join FC Barcelona.

=== National team ===
Vargas debuted for the Spanish national team in 2012 in a 34-20 win against Portugal.

His first major international tournament was the 2014 European Men's Handball Championship. Here Spain won bronze medals. He also represented Spain at the 2015 World Championship.

At the 2018 European Championship in Croatia he won gold medals with the Spanish team. In the last main round game he was injured and could not play for the rest of the tournament.

He participated at the 2019 World Men's Handball Championship.

At the 2020 European Championship in Sweden/Austria/Norway he won gold medals with the Spanish team. In the latter he made the tournament All-star team as the goalkeeper.

At the 2021 Olympics he won bronze medals.

At the 2022 European Men's Handball Championship, he won a silver medal. He played all 9 games and had a save percentage of 33%.

At the 2023 World Championship he won bronze medals. He also represented Spain at the 2024 Olympics where Spain won bronze medals.

At the 2025 World Men's Handball Championship in a match against Sweden, Vargas showed a high level of fair play, when at the 40 minute mark Hampus Wanne got an incorrect red card for hitting Vargas in the head on a penalty throw, Pérez de Vargas went to the referee to correct him and let Wanne play on.

== Honours ==
- EHF Champions League
  - 2011, 2015, 2021, 2022, 2024
- IHF Men's Super Globe
  - 2014, 2017, 2018, 2019
- Spanish League
  - 2011, 2015, 2016, 2017, 2018, 2019, 2020, 2021, 2022, 2023, 2024
- Copa del Rey
  - 2009, 2010, 2015, 2016, 2017, 2018, 2019, 2020, 2021, 2022, 2023, 2024
- Copa ASOBAL
  - 2010, 2015, 2016, 2017, 2018, 2019, 2020, 2021, 2022, 2023, 2024, 2025
- Supercopa ASOBAL
  - 2009, 2010, 2014, 2015, 2016, 2017, 2018, 2019, 2020, 2021
- Catalan Supercup
  - 2014, 2015, 2016, 2017, 2018, 2019, 2020, 2021, 2022, 2023, 2024
- Pyrenean league
  - 2010, 2011
- Iberian Supercup
  - 2022, 2023, 2024
