= 2017–18 Liga ASOBAL =

Liga ASOBAL
- Season: 2017–18
- Champions: FC Barcelona
- Relegated: Fertiberia Puerto Sagunto, MMT Seguros Zamora
- EHF Champions League: FC Barcelona, Abanca Ademar León
- EHF Cup: BM Granollers, CB Ciudad de Logroño, BM Ciudad Encantada
- Matches played: 240
- Top goalscorer: Chema Márquez (196 goals)

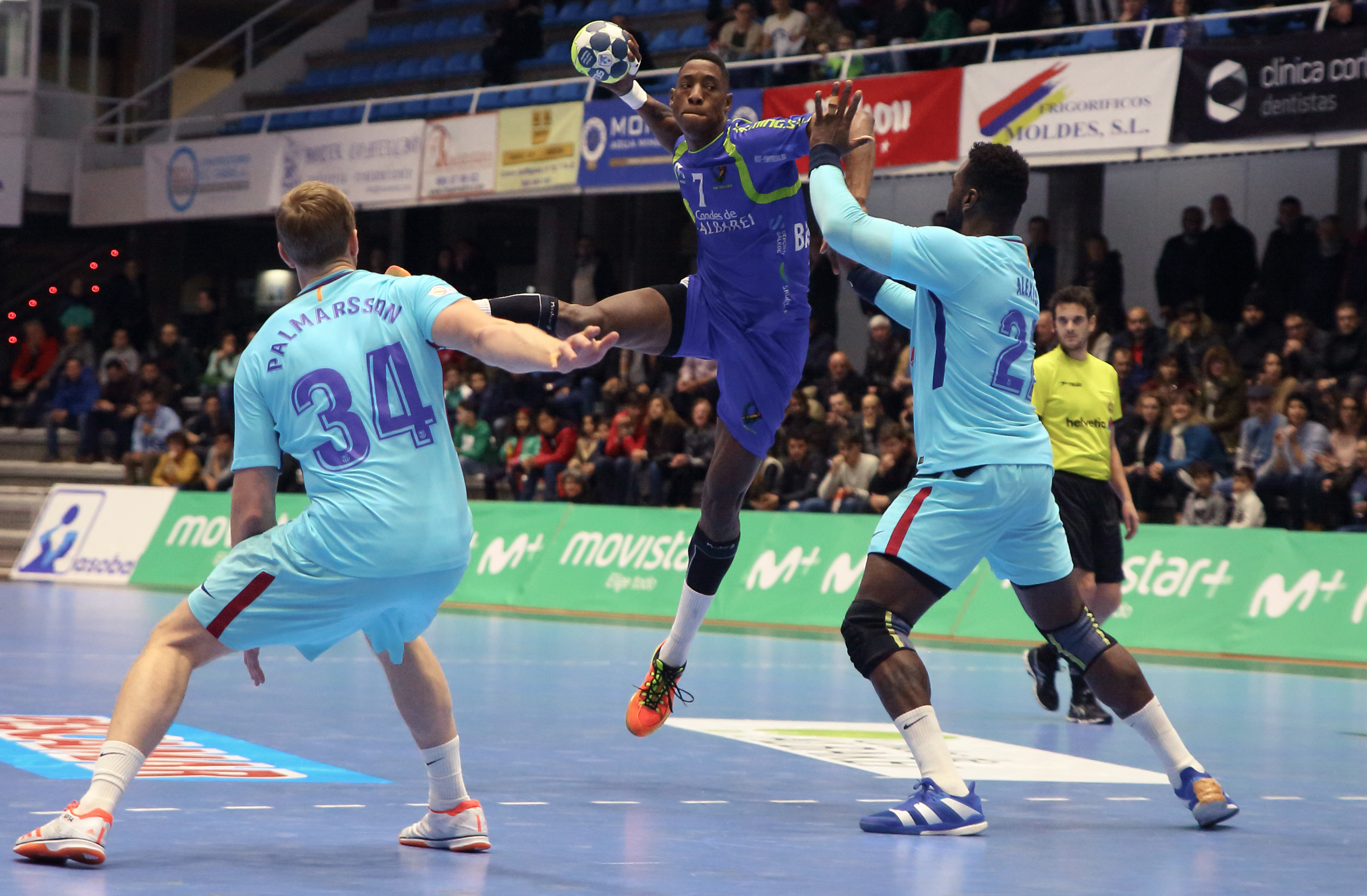
Condes de Albarei Teucro – FC Barcelona Lassa ( Yoan Balázquez)

The 2017–18 Liga ASOBAL, also named Liga ASOBAL by sponsorship reasons, is the 28th season since its establishment.

== Promotion and relegation ==
Teams relegated to 2017–18 División de Plata

- DS Auto Gomas Sinfín
- BM Villa de Aranda

Teams promoted from 2016–17 División de Plata

- Condes de Albarei Teucro
- MMT Seguros Zamora

== Teams ==
2017–18 Liga Asobal teams

Team	City	Venue	Capacity
Abanca Ademar León	León	Palacio de los Deportes	5,188
Ángel Ximénez Avia PG	Puente Genil	Alcalde Miguel Salas	600
Bada Huesca	Huesca	Palacio de Deportes	5,000
Bidasoa Irún	Irún	Polideportivo Artaleku	2,200
BM Logroño La Rioja	Logroño	Palacio de los Deportes	3,851
BM Benidorm	Benidorm	Palau d'Esports L'Illa	2,500
Condes de Albarei Teucro	Pontevedra	Pavillón Municipal	4,000
FC Barcelona Lassa	Barcelona	Palau Blaugrana	8,250
Fertiberia Puerto Sagunto	Puerto de Sagunto	Pabellón Municipal	1,500
Fraikin Granollers	Granollers	Palau d'Esports	6,500
Frigoríficos del Morrazo	Cangas do Morrazo	O Gatañal	3,000
Helvetia Anaitasuna	Pamplona	Anaitasuna	3,000
Liberbank Ciudad Encantada	Cuenca	El Sargal	1,900
MMT Seguros Zamora	Zamora	Ángel Nieto	2,100
Quabit Guadalajara	Guadalajara	Multiusos de Guadalajara	5,894
Recoletas Atlético Valladolid	Valladolid	Polideportivo Huerta del Rey	3,500

== League table ==
Pos	Team	Pld	W	D	L	GF	GA	GD	Pts	Qualification or relegation
1	FC Barcelona Lassa	30	28	1	1	996	699	+297	57	Qualification to the EHF Champions League
2	Abanca Ademar León	30	20	3	7	841	781	+60	43	Qualification to the EHF Champions League
3	Fraikin BM Granollers	30	20	2	8	877	847	+30	42	Qualification to the EHF Cup
4	BM Logroño La Rioja	30	19	3	8	903	814	+89	41	Qualification to the EHF Cup
5	Liberbank Ciudad Encantada	30	17	3	10	812	776	+36	37	Qualification to the EHF Cup
6	Helvetia Anaitasuna	30	16	4	10	828	833	−5	36	
7	Bada Huesca	30	15	3	12	799	786	+13	33	
8	Quabit Guadalajara	30	12	5	13	821	845	−24	29	
9	Recoletas Atlético Valladolid	30	13	2	15	843	844	−1	28	
10	Bidasoa Irún	30	12	3	15	818	813	+5	27	
11	Club Balonmano Benidorm	30	10	5	15	778	817	−39	25	
12	Ángel Ximénez Avia Puente Genil	30	8	3	19	774	827	−53	19	
13	Frigoríficos del Morrazo	30	8	3	19	750	840	−90	19	
14	Condes de Albarei Teucro	30	7	4	19	791	879	−88	18	
15	Fertiberia Puerto Sagunto	30	5	3	22	759	872	−113	13	Relegation to División de Plata
16	MMT Seguros Zamora	30	5	3	22	737	854	−117	13	Relegation to División de Plata

Source: ASOBAL
