= 2021–22 Liga ASOBAL =

Liga ASOBAL
- Season: 2021-22
- Champions: FC Barcelona
- Relegated: Viveros Herol, BM Iberoquinoa Antequera
- EHF Cup: BM Granollers, Bidasoa Irun, BM Benidorm, Incarlopsa Cuenta, BM Logroño La Rioja
- Matches played: 240
- Goals scored: 14,150 (58.96 per match)
- Top goalscorer: Chema Márquez (207 goals)
- Total attendance: 233.264
- Average attendance: 972

The 2021–22 Sacyr Liga ASOBAL, also named Liga ASOBAL for sponsorship reasons, is the 32nd season of the Spanish top handball league. A total of sixteen teams contested this season's league, which began on 3 September 2021 and is expected to end in May 2022.

FC Barcelona won the Championship.

== Teams ==
2021–22 Liga Asobal teams

Team	City	Venue	Capacity
FC Barcelona	Barcelona	Palau Blaugrana	7,234
Bidasoa Irún	Irún	Polideportivo Artaleku	2,500
BM Logroño La Rioja	Logroño	Palacio de los Deportes de La Rioja	3,809
Fraikin BM Granollers	Granollers	Palau d'Esports de Granollers	6,000
Bada Huesca	Huesca	Palacio Municipal de Huesca	4,900
Incarlopsa Cuenca	Cuenca	Pabellón Municipal El Sargal	1,800
ABANCA Ademar León	León	Pabellón Municipal de los Deportes	6,000
Ángel Ximénez Puerto Genil	Puente Genil	Pabellón Municipal Alcalde Miguel Salas	900
Recoletas Atlético Valladolid	Valladolid	Polideportivo Huerta del Rey	3,550
Helvetia Anaitasuna	Pamplona	Pabellón Anaitasuna	3,000
BM Benidorm	Benidorm	Palau d'Esports L'Illa de Benidorm	3,000
Viveros Herol BM Nava	Nava de la Asunción	Pabellón Municipal Guerreras Naveros	1,000
Unicaja Banco Sinfín	Santander	Pabellón La Alberica	2,300
Frigoríficos Morrazo	Cangas do Morrazo	Pabellón Municipal de O Gatañal	2,500
Bathco BM Torrelavega	Torrelavega	Pabellón Municipal Vicente Trueba	2,400
BM Iberoquinoa Antequera	Antequera	Pabellón Municipal Fernando Argüelles	2,530

== League table ==
Pos	Team	Pld	W	D	L	GF	GA	GD	Pts	Qualification or relegation
1	FC Barcelona	30	28	1	1	1052	797	+255	57	Qualification to the EHF Champions League
2	Fraikin BM Granollers	30	21	2	7	936	853	+83	44	Qualification to the EHF Champions League
3	Bidasoa Irún	30	20	2	8	887	803	+84	42	Qualification to the EHF Cup
4	Club Balonmano Benidorm	30	16	3	11	876	850	+26	35	Qualification to the EHF Cup
5	Incarlopsa Cuenca	30	16	2	12	888	883	+5	34	Qualification to the EHF Cup
6	BM Logroño La Rioja	30	17	0	13	945	924	+21	34	Qualification to the EHF Cup
7	Abanca Ademar León	30	14	2	14	939	945	−6	30	
8	Helvetia Anaitasuna	30	13	3	14	902	876	+26	29	
9	Bada Huesca	30	11	6	13	880	896	−16	28	
10	Ángel Ximénez Puente Genil	30	12	2	16	861	881	−20	26	
11	Bathco BM Torrelavega	30	11	4	15	850	865	−15	26	
12	Frigoríficos Morrazo	30	11	4	15	832	851	−19	26	
13	Recoletas Atlético Valladolid	30	9	4	17	857	931	−74	22	
14	Unicaja Banco Sinfín	30	8	5	17	793	862	−69	21	
15	Viveros Herol BM Nava	30	8	4	18	832	921	−89	20	Relegation to División de Plata
16	BM Iberoquinoa Antequera	30	2	2	26	713	905	−192	6	Relegation to División de Plata

Source: ASOBAL

=== Results ===
Home \ Away	ADE	PGE	HCA	TLV	BID	BEN	ATQ	LOG	BAR	GRA	CNG	ANA	CQN	ATV	SIN	NAV
Abanca Ademar León		30–20														
Ángel Ximénez Puente Genil	–															
Bada Huesca	–															
Bathco BM Torrelavega	–															
Bidasoa Irún																
Club Balonmano Benidorm																
BM Iberoquinoa Antequera																
BM Logroño La Rioja																
FC Barcelona																
Fraikin BM Granollers																
Frigoríficos Morrazo																
Helvetia Anaitasuna																
Incarlopsa Cuenca																
Recoletas Atlético Valladolid																
Unicaja Banco Sinfín																
Viveros Herol BM Nava																

Legend: Blue = home team win; Red = away team win.

== Awards ==
=== Monthly awards ===
Month	Player of the Month		
Month	Player	Position	Club
September			
October			
November			
December			
February			
March			
