= 2023–24 Liga ASOBAL =

34th season of the Liga ASOBAL

Liga ASOBAL
- Season: 2023-24
- Dates: 6 September 2023 – 25 May 2024
- Champions: FC Barcelona
- Relegated: Blendio Sinfín; Fertiberia Puerto Sagunto
- Champions League: FC Barcelona
- European League: Bidasoa Irún; Bathco BM Torrelavega; Fraikin BM Granollers; Abanca Ademar León
- Matches played: 240
- Goals scored: 14,489 (60.37 per match)
- Top goalscorer: Carlos Álvarez (200 goals)
- Total attendance: 307364
- Average attendance: 1281

The 2023–24 Liga ASOBAL was the 34th season of the Liga ASOBAL, Spain's premier handball league. The season began on 6 September 2023 and concluded on 25 May 2024.

On 13 April 2024, defending champions FC Barcelona officially secured their 31st title following a 40–37 victory over Fraikin BM Granollers.

== Teams ==
2023-24 Liga Asobal teams

=== Team changes ===
Promoted from 2022–23 División de Plata de Balonmano	Relegated from 2022–23 Liga ASOBAL
Fertiberia Puerto Sagunto; Viveros Herol BM Nava	AD Ciudad de Guadalajara; BM Cisne

=== Stadiums ===
Team	City	Venue	Capacity
Abanca Ademar León	León	Pabellón Municipal de los Deportes	6,000
Ángel Ximénez Puente Genil	Puente Genil	Pabellón Municipal Alcalde Miguel Salas	900
Bada Huesca	Huesca	Palacio Municipal de Huesca	4,900
Bathco BM Torrelavega	Torrelavega	Pabellón Municipal Vicente Trueba	2,400
Bidasoa Irún	Irún	Polideportivo Artaleku	2,500
Blendio Sinfín	Santander	Pabellón La Albericia	2,300
BM Logroño La Rioja	Logroño	Palacio de los Deportes de La Rioja	3,809
FC Barcelona	Barcelona	Palau Blaugrana	7,234
Fertiberia Puerto Sagunto	Sagunto	Pabellón Municipal Internúcleos	1,500
Fraikin BM Granollers	Granollers	Palau d'Esports de Granollers	6,000
Frigoríficos del Morrazo	Cangas do Morrazo	Pabellón Municipal de O Gatañal	2,500
Helvetia Anaitasuna	Pamplona	Pabellón Anaitasuna	3,000
Rebi Balonmano Cuenca	Cuenca	Pabellón Municipal El Sargal	1,800
Recoletas Atlético Valladolid	Valladolid	Polideportivo Huerta del Rey	3,550
TM Benidorm	Benidorm	Palau d'Esports L'Illa de Benidorm	3,000
Viveros Herol BM Nava	Nava de la Asunción	Pabellón Municipal Guerrer@s Naver@s	900

== League table ==
Pos	Team	Pld	W	D	L	GF	GA	GD	Pts	Qualification or relegation
1	FC Barcelona (C)	30	29	1	0	1161	772	+389	59	Qualification for the Champions League group stage
2	Bidasoa Irún	30	20	3	7	935	815	+120	43	Qualification for the European League group stage
3	Fraikin BM Granollers	30	18	6	6	960	887	+73	42	Qualification for the European League qualification round
4	BM Logroño La Rioja	30	19	2	9	925	876	+49	40	
5	Abanca Ademar León	30	14	6	10	964	906	+58	34	Qualification for the European League qualification round
6	Viveros Herol BM Nava	30	14	5	11	902	934	−32	33	
7	Recoletas Atlético Valladolid	30	15	1	14	900	910	−10	31	
8	Bada Huesca	30	13	4	13	909	948	−39	30	
9	Helvetia Anaitasuna	30	14	2	14	885	920	−35	30	
10	TM Benidorm	30	9	7	14	877	894	−17	25	
11	Bathco BM Torrelavega	30	12	1	17	897	933	−36	25	Qualification for the European League group stage (Note: Since the winners of the 2023–24 Copa del Rey de Balonmano, FC Barcelona, qualified for the Champions League based on league position, the European League spot was passed to the runners-up.)
12	Ángel Ximénez Puente Genil	30	11	3	16	834	871	−37	25	
13	Rebi Balonmano Cuenca	30	11	3	16	861	902	−41	25	
14	Frigoríficos del Morrazo	30	8	8	14	885	954	−69	24	Relegation playoffs
15	Blendio Sinfín (R)	30	2	4	24	810	994	−184	8	Relegation to División de Plata
16	Fertiberia Puerto Sagunto (R)	30	2	2	26	784	973	−189	6	Relegation to División de Plata

Source: ASOBAL
Rules for classification: 1) points; 2) head-to-head points; 3) head-to-head goal difference; 4) head-to-head number of goals scored; 5) goal difference; 6) goals scored.
(C) Champions; (R) Relegated

== Results ==
Home \ Away	ADE	PGE	HCA	TLV	BID	SIN	LOG	BAR	PSG	GRA	CNG	ANA	CQN	ATV	BEN	NAV
Abanca Ademar León	—	23–23	35–29	40–30	33–32	37–24	33–33	25–39	35–23	29–29	39–27	38–23	37–27	27–22	37–32	34–34
Ángel Ximénez Puente Genil	26–28	—	43–32	32–28	28–27	31–25	24–31	28–36	37–27	25–28	24–22	33–33	30–25	29–27	29–39	28–32
Bada Huesca	26–29	32–31	—	34–30	32–29	37–29	36–32	28–46	33–22	27–35	29–38	28–23	33–26	25–30	37–30	35–28
Bathco BM Torrelavega	31–30	31–28	39–28	—	29–34	26–24	27–31	27–36	32–27	31–35	32–33	26–37	34–28	26–28	31–30	33–26
Bidasoa Irún	31–27	37–19	31–24	34–31	—	36–24	36–25	26–26	34–24	30–33	34–23	42–33	35–31	31–27	26–26	37–26
Blendio Sinfín	34–43	27–35	29–29	30–37	21–29	—	27–32	16–37	27–27	25–38	22–26	30–35	29–36	31–36	22–30	40–33
BM Logroño La Rioja	37–34	24–21	30–30	33–26	27–28	32–28	—	24–30	38–27	34–31	32–27	32–25	30–34	28–25	33–23	39–35
FC Barcelona	39–29	32–18	41–29	41–24	30–23	44–25	38–29	—	41–24	40–37	38–32	45–26	46–18	42–27	33–30	36–25
Fertiberia Puerto Sagunto	27–31	30–31	31–34	20–26	26–32	38–38	24–22	20–51	—	21–33	34–26	25–26	28–33	29–34	24–27	25–31
Fraikin BM Granollers	34–34	22–26	36–27	29–26	30–30	32–24	30–28	23–40	35–28	—	40–31	32–31	29–29	35–27	35–27	37–29
Frigoríficos del Morrazo	34–31	27–27	30–30	27–27	25–27	31–32	29–32	24–45	35–29	32–32	—	32–31	34–31	30–29	34–34	29–29
Helvetia Anaitasuna	28–25	34–27	32–31	32–29	20–24	27–27	33–36	24–40	24–22	30–26	32–29	—	26–24	39–35	29–26	27–28
Rebi Balonmano Cuenca	39–32	28–27	25–27	25–29	29–26	33–24	32–35	21–36	33–24	28–30	33–28	24–21	—	33–27	24–24	27–27
Recoletas Atlético Valladolid	36–33	26–21	26–27	32–33	33–35	29–26	29–25	31–42	33–26	36–30	38–38	34–33	29–26	—	31–30	32–29
TM Benidorm	26–26	31–27	26–26	35–33	24–31	26–25	28–34	28–34	31–24	29–29	32–23	37–40	30–27	28–29	—	29–32
Viveros Herol BM Nava	31–30	27–26	36–34	34–33	29–28	32–25	26–27	31–37	30–28	33–35	29–29	33–31	35–32	23–22	29–29	—

Source: ASOBAL
Legend: Blue = home team win; Yellow = draw; Red = away team win.

== Top goalscorers ==
Rank	Player	Club	Goals
1	(Spain) Carlos Álvarez	Abanca Ademar León	200
2	(Spain) Juan Castro	Abanca Ademar León	165
3	(Spain) David Cadarso	BM Logroño La Rioja	163
4	(Spain) Nacho Vallés	TM Benidorm	162
5	(Brazil) Rodrigo Benites	Bada Huesca	156
6	(Spain) Adrián Nolasco	Fertiberia Puerto Sagunto	153
7	(Argentina) Ramiro Martínez	TM Benidorm	151
8	(Argentina) Federico Pizarro	Rebi Balonmano Cuenca	148
9	(France) Melvyn Richardson	FC Barcelona	145
10	(Spain) Mario Dorado	Frigoríficos del Morrazo	144
