= 2024–25 Liga ASOBAL =

35th season of the Liga ASOBAL

Liga ASOBAL
- Season: 2024–25
- Dates: 13 September 2024 – 1 June 2025
- Champions: FC Barcelona
- Relegated: Helvetia Anaitasuna; TM Benidorm
- Champions League: FC Barcelona
- European League: Fraikin BM Granollers; Abanca Ademar León; Bathco BM Torrelavega; Bidasoa Irún
- Matches: 240
- Goals: 14,605 (60.85 per match)
- Top goalscorer: Carlos Álvarez (178 goals)

The 2024–25 Liga ASOBAL was the 35th season of the Liga ASOBAL, Spain's premier handball league. The season began on 13 September 2024 and concluded on 1 June 2025.

On 18 April 2025, defending champions FC Barcelona officially secured their 32nd title following a 39–25 victory over Helvetia Anaitasuna.

== Teams ==
2024–25 Liga Asobal teams

=== Team changes ===
Promoted from 2023–24 División de Plata de Balonmano	Relegated from 2023–24 Liga ASOBAL
BM Guadalajara; Tubos Aranda Villa de Aranda	Blendio Sinfín; Fertiberia Puerto Sagunto

=== Stadiums ===
Team	City	Venue	Capacity
Abanca Ademar León	León	Pabellón Municipal de los Deportes	6,000
Ángel Ximénez Puente Genil	Puente Genil	Pabellón Municipal Alcalde Miguel Salas	900
Bada Huesca	Huesca	Palacio Municipal de Huesca	4,900
Bathco BM Torrelavega	Torrelavega	Pabellón Municipal Vicente Trueba	2,400
Bidasoa Irún	Irún	Polideportivo Artaleku	2,500
BM Guadalajara	Guadalajara	Pabellón David Santamaría	1,500
BM Logroño La Rioja	Logroño	Palacio de los Deportes de La Rioja	3,809
FC Barcelona	Barcelona	Palau Blaugrana	7,234
Fraikin BM Granollers	Granollers	Palau d'Esports de Granollers	6,000
Frigoríficos del Morrazo	Cangas do Morrazo	Pabellón Municipal de O Gatañal	2,500
Helvetia Anaitasuna	Pamplona	Pabellón Anaitasuna	3,000
Rebi Balonmano Cuenca	Cuenca	Pabellón Municipal El Sargal	1,800
Recoletas Atlético Valladolid	Valladolid	Polideportivo Huerta del Rey	3,550
TM Benidorm	Benidorm	Palau d'Esports L'Illa de Benidorm	3,000
Tubos Aranda Villa de Aranda	Aranda de Duero	Pabellón Santiago Manguán	2,800
Viveros Herol BM Nava	Nava de la Asunción	Pabellón Municipal Guerrer@s Naver@s	900

== League table ==
Pos	Team	Pld	W	D	L	GF	GA	GD	Pts	Qualification or relegation
1	FC Barcelona (C)	30	27	1	2	1162	870	+292	55	Qualification for the Champions League group stage
2	Fraikin BM Granollers	30	20	3	7	1030	960	+70	43	Qualification for the European League group stage
3	Bathco BM Torrelavega	30	18	5	7	903	882	+21	41	Qualification for the European League qualification round
4	Bidasoa Irún	30	17	5	8	907	869	+38	39	Qualification for the European League qualification round
5	BM Logroño La Rioja	30	18	3	9	972	911	+61	39	
6	Abanca Ademar León	30	15	7	8	857	848	+9	37	Qualification for the European League group stage (Note: Since the winners of the 2024–25 Copa del Rey de Balonmano, FC Barcelona, qualified for the Champions League based on league position, the European League spot was passed to the runners-up.)
7	Recoletas Atlético Valladolid	30	14	5	11	909	896	+13	33	
8	Viveros Herol BM Nava	30	11	5	14	919	953	−34	27	
9	Tubos Aranda Villa de Aranda	30	12	2	16	860	924	−64	26	
10	Rebi Balonmano Cuenca	30	10	3	17	893	944	−51	23	
11	Frigoríficos del Morrazo	30	9	2	19	932	940	−8	20	
12	Ángel Ximénez Puente Genil	30	9	2	19	838	905	−67	20	
13	Bada Huesca	30	9	2	19	866	917	−51	20	
14	BM Guadalajara	30	8	3	19	847	951	−104	19	Relegation playoffs
15	Helvetia Anaitasuna (R)	30	8	3	19	843	896	−53	19	Relegation to División de Plata
16	TM Benidorm (R)	30	7	5	18	867	939	−72	19	Relegation to División de Plata

Source: ASOBAL
Rules for classification: 1) points; 2) head-to-head points; 3) head-to-head goal difference; 4) head-to-head number of goals scored; 5) goal difference; 6) goals scored.
(C) Champions; (R) Relegated

== Results ==
Home \ Away	ADE	PGE	HCA	TLV	BID	GUA	LOG	BAR	GRA	CNG	ANA	CQN	ATV	BEN	VDA	NAV
Abanca Ademar León	—	31–20	23–25	28–35	29–29	31–25	30–38	30–35	31–24	38–36	26–25	33–32	29–27	27–23	30–25	34–27
Ángel Ximénez Puente Genil	29–31	—	27–21	26–30	33–25	28–31	26–28	26–43	28–35	35–34	26–23	33–24	29–28	32–31	31–28	32–33
Bada Huesca	22–25	31–24	—	29–30	25–26	30–24	28–32	21–39	34–37	31–28	35–40	32–30	35–26	30–26	29–32	30–33
Bathco BM Torrelavega	23–23	29–26	34–29	—	30–34	36–30	28–41	26–41	35–34	31–29	29–28	28–25	31–31	29–29	25–26	28–24
Bidasoa Irún	22–27	31–25	35–30	25–25	—	37–27	29–30	30–36	30–28	30–24	30–29	28–27	32–27	31–30	34–27	37–29
BM Guadalajara	28–28	26–25	29–29	28–25	29–35	—	22–32	27–36	27–28	31–37	32–29	32–29	24–29	37–31	34–35	31–31
BM Logroño La Rioja	30–29	33–34	27–25	26–28	29–31	39–32	—	28–38	38–42	33–28	32–28	38–26	34–27	34–30	36–30	30–31
FC Barcelona	42–25	44–26	39–30	40–34	32–30	49–33	37–37	—	30–31	45–38	39–25	35–26	34–30	44–30	45–27	40–32
Fraikin BM Granollers	30–30	32–32	41–32	32–32	36–35	39–33	28–27	27–31	—	34–31	36–31	34–27	42–36	37–31	40–30	38–33
Frigoríficos del Morrazo	21–22	26–25	38–29	29–25	30–31	32–23	29–30	30–37	38–36	—	30–30	36–29	30–26	29–30	27–24	34–35
Helvetia Anaitasuna	24–24	27–25	26–24	29–33	28–29	27–29	27–30	31–38	28–29	37–34	—	33–26	22–27	30–29	22–32	28–27
Rebi Balonmano Cuenca	30–30	35–28	35–34	26–35	32–30	24–17	35–31	35–48	38–35	33–30	31–30	—	30–30	29–32	24–24	24–25
Recoletas Atlético Valladolid	35–31	27–25	24–21	28–31	25–25	30–26	40–40	26–24	42–35	34–34	34–26	28–27	—	27–24	37–26	35–32
TM Benidorm	28–28	28–25	28–30	27–33	27–27	33–28	29–30	23–37	27–37	38–37	26–26	32–38	28–30	—	32–31	30–23
Tubos Aranda Villa de Aranda	25–27	28–25	28–34	31–36	26–26	22–23	32–27	27–42	31–36	29–27	27–26	35–34	31–30	32–24	—	31–34
Viveros Herol BM Nava	33–27	32–32	31–31	28–29	37–33	35–29	32–32	29–43	32–37	30–26	27–28	28–32	38–33	31–31	27–28	—

Source: ASOBAL
Legend: Blue = home team win; Yellow = draw; Red = away team win.

== Top goalscorers ==
Rank	Player	Club	Goals
1	(Spain) Carlos Álvarez	Abanca Ademar León	178
2	(Spain) Antonio García	Fraikin BM Granollers	177
3	(Spain) Álvaro Martínez	Recoletas Atlético Valladolid	174
4	(Spain) Nacho Valles	TM Benidorm	171
5	(Spain) Miguel Malo	Bada Huesca	170
6	(Brazil) Rudolph Hackbarth	Rebi Balonmano Cuenca	159
6	(Spain) Mario Nevado	Viveros Herol BM Nava	159
8	(Slovakia) Jakub Prokop	Bathco BM Torrelavega	150
8	(Denmark) Mads Thymann	Frigoríficos del Morrazo	150
10	(Spain) Dalmau Huix	Tubos Aranda Villa de Aranda	146
