= Vučinić =

Vučinić (pronounced [vǔtʃinitɕ]), also rendered Vucinic, Vucinich, or Vucenich, is a primarily Montenegrin surname. Notable people with the surname include:

- Alexander S. Vucinich (1914–2002), American historian and professor
- Boro Vučinić (born 1954), Montenegrin politician
- Dragiša Vučinić (born 1948), Serbian basketball coach and former player
- Duška Vučinić, Serbian television journalist, presenter and director
- Gojko Vučinić (1970–2021), Montenegrin handballer
- Janko Vučinić (1966–2019), Montenegrin boxer, union leader and politician
- Jovan Vučinić (born 1992), Montenegrin footballer
- Maksim Vučinić (born 1994), Montenegrin politician and electrical engineer
- Milutin Vučinić (1869–1922), Montenegrin soldier and politician, Prime Minister of the Montenegrin government in exile
- Mirko Vučinić (born 1983), Montenegrin footballer
- Nebojša Vučinić (born 1953), Montenegrin judge
- Nenad Vučinić (born 1965), Serbian-New Zealand basketball coach and former player
- Rašo Vučinić (born 1982), Serbian politician and former bobsledder
- Saša Vučinić, Serbian journalist
- Saša Vučinić (Serbian politician) (born 1973)
- Vladana Vučinić (born 1986), Montenegrin singer
- Wayne S. Vucinich (1913–2005), American historian and professor
