= Liga ASOBAL 1998–99 =

Liga ASOBAL 1998–99 season was the ninth since its establishment. A total of 14 teams competed this season for the championship.

== Competition format ==
This season, the competition format consisted in two phases.

Phase	Remark
First	All teams competed in the first phase through 26 rounds in a round-robin format.
Second	The second phase was divided in two groups; the first four teams competed for the championship, and the last four teams competed for the permanence.

== Overall standing ==
Pos	Team	Pld	W	D	L	GF	GA	GD	Pts	Qualification or relegation
1	Barcelona	26	23	2	1	843	636	+207	48	Championship playoff
2	Prosesa Ademar León	26	17	4	5	747	634	+113	38	Championship playoff
3	Portland San Antonio	26	15	4	7	713	665	+48	34	Championship playoff
4	Ciudad Real	26	14	6	6	686	665	+21	34	Championship playoff
5	Caja Cantabria	26	16	1	9	707	632	+75	33	
6	Valladolid	26	13	4	9	723	718	+5	30	
7	CajaPontevedra	26	10	4	12	638	680	−42	24	
8	Cadagua Gáldar	26	8	8	10	735	720	+15	24	
9	Granollers	26	9	3	14	645	679	−34	21	
10	Redcom Airtel Chapela	26	9	2	15	560	634	−74	20	
11	Bidasoa	26	7	4	15	618	674	−56	18	Permanence playoff
12	Frigorificos Morrazo	26	6	2	18	603	688	−85	14	Permanence playoff
13	Altea	26	6	2	18	668	744	−76	14	Permanence playoff
14	Barakaldo UPV	26	4	4	18	663	780	−117	12	Permanence playoff

=== Championship playoff ===
semi-finals
1	Barcelona	31	20
4	Ciudad Real	23	19
2	Prosesa Ademar León	30	27	29
3	Portland San Antonio	21	29	22

final
1	Barcelona	27	37	30
2	Prosesa Ademar León	24	30	24

1998–99 Liga ASOBAL winners
(Catalonia)
Barcelona
Sixth title

=== permanence playoff ===
Pos	Team	Pld	W	D	L	GF	GA	GD	Pts	Relegation
1	Frigorificos Morrazo	12	7	1	4	290	280	+10	15	
2	Bidasoa	12	5	3	4	316	285	+31	13	In–Out promotion
3	Altea	12	6	1	5	301	302	−1	13	Relegated
4	Barakaldo UPV	12	3	1	8	295	335	−40	7	Relegated

=== In–Out playoff ===
In-Out playoff
Bidasoa	32	34
Pilotes Posada	26	34

- Bidasoa remained in Liga ASOBAL.

== Top goal scorers ==
Player	Goals	Team
(Belarus) Andrei Parashenko	195	Cadagua Gáldar
(Spain) Juan Domínguez	181	CajaPontevedra
(Ukraine) Serhiy Bebeshko	168	Ciudad Real
(Russia) Andrei Kovalev	162	Barakaldo UPV
(Spain) Alberto Entrerríos	150	Prosesa Ademar León
(Belarus) Mikhail Yakimovich	146	Caja Cantabria
(Socialist Federal Republic of Yugoslavia) Jovan Kovačević	136	Frigorificos Morrazo
(Spain) Luis Parro	133	Altea
(Spain) Samuel Trives	130	Ciudad Real
(Spain) Chechu Villaldea	129	Portland San Antonio
