= BM Puente Genil =

Spanish handball club

Ángel Ximénez Puente Genil
- Full name: Club Balonmano Puente Genil
- Nickname: Ximénez
- Founded: 1984; 42 years ago
- Arena: Pabellón Municipal Alcalde Miguel Salas, Puente Genil
- Capacity: 1085
- President: Rafael Miguel Jiménez Rosales
- Head coach: Francisco Bustos
- League: Liga ASOBAL
- 2024-25: 12th
- Club colours
Home	Away

Ángel Ximénez Puente Genil is a team of handball based in Puente Genil, Spain. It plays in Liga ASOBAL.

Location of Ángel Ximénez Puente Genil

== History ==
The association was founded in 1984. Its predecessor was the Puente Genil OJE association. From 1987 to 1990, from 2009 to 2010 and from 2011 to 2013, the team belonged to the second division, and since 2013 they have been continuously in the Spanish first division, Liga ASOBAL.

== Crest, colours, supporters ==
=== Kits ===
HOME

2015–16

AWAY
2015–16	2016–17

== Team ==
=== Current squad ===
Squad for the 2022–23 season

Ángel Ximénez Puente Genil

Goalkeepers

- 1 (Sweden) Henrik Nordlander
- 12 (Spain) Álvaro de Hita

Left Wingers

- 5 (Spain) Antonio Cabello Núñez
- 23 (Spain) Xavi Tuà

Right Wingers

- 10 (Spain) José Cuenca Cano (c)
- 14 (Spain) Javier Muñoz

Line Players

- 4 (Brazil) Márcio da Silva
- 22 (Spain) Javier García Rubio
- 24 (Georgia (country)) Erekle Arsenashvili

Central Backs

- 6 (Argentina) Martín Nicolás Jung
- 28 (Israel) Chen Pomeranz
- 33 (Portugal) Gonçalo Ribeiro

Left Backs

- 7 (Romania) Andrei Buzle
- 78 (Spain) David Estepa

Right Backs

- 11 (Spain) Luis Felipe Jiménez Reina

=== Technical staff ===
- Head coach: (Spain) Francisco Bustos
- Assistant coach: (Spain) Agustín Avilés Baena
- Fitness coach: (Spain) Juanje Leiva
- Physiotherapist: (Spain) Jesús Morales

=== Transfers ===
Transfers for the 2026–27 season

Joining

- (Argentina) Nicolás Bonanno (LB) from (Spain) CB Nava
- (Croatia) Matej Ašanin (GK) from (Turkey) Beşiktaş JK
- (Spain) Pablo Soler Lucena (LW) back from loan at (Spain) BM Proin Triana
- (Spain) Quim Rocas (CB) on loan from (Spain) BM Granollers

Leaving

- (Argentina) Lucas Aizen (RB) to (Spain) BM Benidorm
- (Cape Verde) Leandro Semedo (LB) to (Romania) AHC Potaissa Turda
- (Cuba) Claudio Ramos (LP) to (Spain) CB Burgos
- (Spain) Domingo Luís (RB) to (Romania) CSM București

=== Transfer History ===
Transfers for the 2025–26 season

Joining

- (Cape Verde) Leandro Semedo (LB) from Kuwait SC
- (Serbia) Borivoje Djukic (LB) from (Serbia) RK Metaloplastika
- (Spain) Mario Dorado Pérez (LW) from (France) Caen Handball

Leaving

- (Tunisia) Fradj Ben Tekaya (GK) to (Spain) BM Huesca
- (France) Mahamadou Keïta (LW) to (North Macedonia) RK Vardar
- (Hungary) Tamás Jánosi (LB) loan back to (Hungary) Balatonfüredi KSE
- (Spain) Pablo Soler Lucena (LW) on loan at (Spain) BM Proin Triana

Transfers for the 2022–23 season

Joining

- (Sweden) Henrik Nordlander (GK) from (Sweden) IFK Ystad HK
- (Portugal) Gonçalo Ribeiro (CB) from (Germany) EHV Aue
- (Argentina) Martín Nicolás Jung (CB) from (Spain) CBM Córdoba
- (Romania) Andrei Buzle (LB) from (Romania) CS Minaur Baia Mare
- (Georgia (country)) Erekle Arsenashvili (LP) from (Portugal) Sporting CP
- (Spain) Javier Muñoz (RW) from (France) Saran Loiret HB

Leaving

- (Brazil) João Pedro Silva (CB) to (Romania) Dinamo București
- (Brazil) Felipe Borges (LW) to (Spain) BM Zaragoza
- (Slovenia) Jaka Spiljak (LB) to (Cyprus) Anorthosis Famagusta
- (Serbia) Borivoje Djukic (LB) to (Romania) CSM Oradea
- (Slovakia) Michal Martin Konečný (GK) to (Austria) SC Ferlach
- (Serbia) Mihajlo Mitić (RB) to (Spain) Bidasoa Irún
- (United States) Sean Corning (RW) to (Spain) CB Pozoblanco
- (Spain) Antonio Pineda Moyano (LW) on loan at (Spain) CBM Córdoba
- (Spain) Álvaro Muñoz Lozano (RB) on loan at (Spain) Cordoplas BM La Salle

== Previous Squads ==
2019–2020 Team
Shirt No	Nationality	Player	Birth Date	Position
4	Brazil	André Amorim	30 March 1997 (age 29)	Right Back
7	Portugal	Sérgio Barros	23 February 1992 (age 34)	Left Winger
8	Spain	José Consuegra	1 June 1996 (age 30)	Central Back
10	Spain	José Cuenca Cano	3 June 1989 (age 37)	Right Winger
12	Spain	Álvaro de Hita	16 February 1977 (age 49)	Goalkeeper
13	Spain	Juan Castro Álvarez	31 October 1990 (age 36)	Central Back
16	Bosnia and Herzegovina	Admir Ahmetasević	5 June 1994 (age 32)	Goalkeeper
17	Portugal	Nuno Miguel Pereira Gonçalves	24 March 1993 (age 33)	Left Back
18	Spain	Pablo Martín Pino	12 February 1998 (age 28)	Line Player
22	Spain	Javier García Rubio	7 January 1990 (age 36)	Line Player
23	Spain	Xavi Tuà	13 February 1998 (age 28)	Left Winger
24	Spain	Antonio Triviño	11 March 1982 (age 44)	Goalkeeper
26	Russia	Ruslan Dashko	13 August 1996 (age 30)	Right Back
33	Iran	Allahkaram Esteki	19 March 1988 (age 38)	Left Back
73	Spain	Victor Alonso	9 March 1990 (age 36)	Right Back
78	Spain	David Estepa	23 April 1999 (age 27)	Left Back

== Season by season ==
Season	Tier	Division	Pos.	Notes
1984–85	2	1ª División	9th	Relegated
1985–86	3	2ª División		
1986–87	3	2ª División		
1987–88	3	1ª División "B"	3rd	
1988–89	3	1ª División "B"		
1989–90	3	1ª División "B"		
1990–07	4	2ª División		
2007–08	3	1ª Estatal	4th	
2008–09	3	1ª Estatal	2nd	Promoted
2009–10	2	Plata	15th	Relegated
2010–11	3	1ª Estatal	1st	Promoted
2011–12	2	Plata	7th	
2012–13	2	Plata	4th	Promoted

Season	Tier	Division	Pos.	Notes
2013–14	1	ASOBAL	11th	
2014–15	1	ASOBAL	12th	
2015–16	1	ASOBAL	14th	
2016–17	1	ASOBAL	9th	
2017–18	1	ASOBAL	12th	
2018–19	1	ASOBAL	13th	
2019–20	1	ASOBAL	8th	
2020–21	1	ASOBAL	8th	
2021–22	1	ASOBAL	10th	
2022–23	1	ASOBAL	8th	
2023–24	1	ASOBAL	12th	
2024–25	1	ASOBAL	12th	

== EHF ranking ==
As of 5/12/2025

Rank	Team	Points
261	(Serbia) RK Železničar 1949	3
262	(Ukraine) HC Motor Zaporizhzhia	2
263	(Slovenia) RK Maribor Branik	2
264	(Spain) Ángel Ximénez Puente Genil	2
265	(Hungary) Komlói Bányász SK	2
266	(Kosovo) KH Vëllaznimi	2
267	(Croatia) RK Međimurje	2

== Former club members ==
=== Notable former players ===
- (Spain) Victor Alonso (2018–2020)
- (Spain) Rafael Baena (2014–2015)
- (Spain) Javier García Rubio (2018–)
- (Algeria) Khalifa Ghedbane (2017–2018)
- (Brazil) Leonardo Domenech de Almeida (2016–2019)
- (Brazil) Felipe Borges (2021–2022)
- (Brazil) Matheus Dias (2017–2019)
- (Brazil) Anderson Mollino (2020–2021)
- (Brazil) João Pedro Silva (2020–2022)
- (Cape Verde) Flávio Fortes (2015-2016)
- (Cape Verde) Délcio Pina (2021)
- (Iran) Allahkaram Esteki (2019–2020)
- (Israel) Chen Pomeranz (2021–)
- (Japan) Atsushi Mekaru (2016-2017)
- (Portugal) Gonçalo Ribeiro (2022-)
- (Russia) Ruslan Dashko (2019–2020)
- (Russia) Mikhail Revin (2016–2018)
- (Slovakia) Stanislav Demovič (2013-2014)
- (Sweden) Henrik Nordlander (2022-)
- (Uruguay) Gabriel Chaparro (2018-2019)

=== Former coaches ===
Seasons	Coach	Country
2018–2019	Julián Ruiz	(Spain)
2019–	Francisco Bustos	(Spain)
