= 2022–23 Liga ASOBAL =

33rd season of the Liga ASOBAL

Liga ASOBAL
- Season: 2022–23
- Dates: 3 September 2022 – 3 June 2023
- Champions: FC Barcelona
- Relegated: AD Ciudad de Guadalajara; BM Cisne
- Champions League: FC Barcelona
- European League: Incarlopsa Cuenca; Fraikin BM Granollers; BM Logroño La Rioja
- Matches played: 240
- Goals scored: 14,670 (61.13 per match)
- Top goalscorer: Joaquim Nazaré (192 goals)

The 2022–23 Liga ASOBAL was the 33rd season of the Liga ASOBAL, Spain's premier handball league. The season began on 3 September 2022 and ended on 3 June 2023.

FC Barcelona won their 30th title.

== Promotion and relegation ==
Teams relegated to 2022–23 División de Plata

- Club Balonmano Nava
- BM Antequera

Teams promoted from 2021–22 División de Plata

- AD Ciudad de Guadalajara
- BM Cisne

== Teams ==
2022–23 Liga Asobal teams

Team	City	Venue	Capacity
FC Barcelona	Barcelona	Palau Blaugrana	7,234
Bidasoa Irún	Irún	Polideportivo Artaleku	2,500
BM Logroño La Rioja	Logroño	Palacio de los Deportes de La Rioja	3,809
Fraikin BM Granollers	Granollers	Palau d'Esports de Granollers	6,000
Bada Huesca	Huesca	Palacio Municipal de Huesca	4,900
Incarlopsa Cuenca	Cuenca	Pabellón Municipal El Sargal	1,800
ABANCA Ademar León	León	Pabellón Municipal de los Deportes	6,000
Ángel Ximénez Puerto Genil	Puente Genil	Pabellón Municipal Alcalde Miguel Salas	900
Recoletas Atlético Valladolid	Valladolid	Polideportivo Huerta del Rey	3,550
Helvetia Anaitasuna	Pamplona	Pabellón Anaitasuna	3,000
BM Benidorm	Benidorm	Palau d'Esports L'Illa de Benidorm	3,000
AD Ciudad de Guadalajara	Guadalajara	Palacio Multiusos de Guadalajara	5,894
Unicaja Banco Sinfín	Santander	Pabellón La Alberica	2,300
Frigoríficos Morrazo	Cangas do Morrazo	Pabellón Municipal de O Gatañal	2,500
Bathco BM Torrelavega	Torrelavega	Pabellón Municipal Vicente Trueba	2,400
BM Cisne	Pontevedra	Estadio da Xuventude	4,000

== League table ==
Pos	Team	Pld	W	D	L	GF	GA	GD	Pts	Qualification or relegation
1	FC Barcelona (C)	30	30	0	0	1187	804	+383	60	Qualification to the EHF Champions League
2	Incarlopsa Cuenca	30	19	4	7	891	841	+50	42	Qualification to the EHF European League
3	Fraikin BM Granollers	30	18	4	8	968	919	+49	40	Qualification to the EHF European League
4	Bidasoa Irún	30	19	1	10	982	873	+109	39	
5	BM Logroño La Rioja	30	16	3	11	907	911	−4	35	Qualification to the EHF European League (Note: Since the winners of the 2022-23 Copa del Rey de Balonmano, FC Barcelona, qualified for the Champions League based on league position, the European League spot was passed to the runners-up.)
6	Bathco BM Torrelavega	30	15	2	13	924	940	−16	32	
7	Abanca Ademar León	30	14	4	12	996	993	+3	32	
8	Ángel Ximénez Puente Genil	30	14	2	14	915	960	−45	30	
9	Club Balonmano Benidorm	30	11	3	16	875	903	−28	25	
10	Recoletas Atlético Valladolid	30	11	3	16	868	917	−49	25	
11	Bada Huesca	30	9	5	16	919	937	−18	23	
12	Unicaja Banco Sinfín	30	9	4	17	832	918	−86	22	
13	Helvetia Anaitasuna	30	9	4	17	876	902	−26	22	
14	Frigoríficos Morrazo	30	7	6	17	839	922	−83	20	Relegation playoffs
15	AD Ciudad de Guadalajara (R)	30	8	2	20	834	958	−124	18	Relegation to División de Plata
16	BM Cisne (R)	30	7	1	22	857	972	−115	15	Relegation to División de Plata

Source: ASOBAL
Rules for classification: 1) points; 2) goal difference; 3) goals scored; 4) head-to-head points; 5) head-to-head goal difference; 6) head-to-head number of goals scored.
(C) Champions; (R) Relegated

== Results ==
Home \ Away	ADE	PGE	HCA	TLV	BID	BEN	CIS	LOG	BAR	GRA	CNG	ANA	CQN	ATV	SIN	GUA
Abanca Ademar León	—	34–32	38–34	28–36	35–33	32–32	39–32	34–38	30–42	43–32	37–31	32–31	27–31	39–32	34–31	32–33
Ángel Ximénez Puente Genil	33–33	—	27–26	41–32	36–35	30–27	34–32	30–31	31–43	27–31	29–27	33–32	30–30	28–25	39–34	31–29
Bada Huesca	29–35	37–31	—	27–28	31–39	28–29	35–24	33–29	32–35	31–36	27–27	41–42	27–29	30–32	32–32	34–26
Bathco BM Torrelavega	34–33	34–27	28–29	—	30–36	33–33	32–26	24–26	22–42	29–30	32–25	36–31	24–29	29–28	34–30	36–28
Bidasoa Irún	33–29	32–31	29–25	38–30	—	32–27	42–31	41–29	26–32	30–32	35–26	36–24	30–25	33–28	35–15	39–25
Club Balonmano Benidorm	28–27	29–35	33–24	33–29	26–23	—	32–27	27–28	24–35	38–33	36–31	33–27	20–26	32–27	27–29	32–30
BM Cisne	43–32	27–30	27–32	31–35	19–28	31–28	—	32–33	25–43	29–35	33–31	26–33	30–28	29–33	30–29	28–27
BM Logroño La Rioja	30–30	32–30	31–29	34–35	39–33	27–22	33–32	—	30–35	24–35	34–28	22–26	36–23	37–28	27–31	32–29
FC Barcelona	43–30	46–26	35–30	38–29	39–28	45–34	41–30	43–30	—	37–26	46–26	33–26	41–26	32–24	43–19	38–26
Fraikin BM Granollers	38–38	39–27	35–32	34–28	35–35	32–28	37–24	29–32	22–37	—	36–31	32–30	27–24	29–26	34–27	37–27
Frigoríficos Morrazo	31–33	32–27	28–28	28–33	27–26	27–27	30–25	22–27	21–34	33–33	—	30–25	31–39	27–26	23–23	27–31
Helvetia Anaitasuna	29–27	28–29	29–29	34–26	27–31	33–23	32–29	30–27	26–40	34–34	24–25	—	26–27	29–29	28–30	38–30
Incarlopsa Cuenca	28–26	33–25	33–33	28–28	30–25	29–28	28–30	33–26	26–38	34–28	31–27	29–28	—	31–20	29–29	34–24
Recoletas Atlético Valladolid	30–37	33–29	33–34	33–32	32–37	31–30	35–31	29–29	28–42	24–23	25–25	30–22	28–33	—	30–25	30–31
Unicaja Banco Sinfín	29–32	26–29	29–30	32–34	33–32	34–32	21–20	34–30	28–39	34–30	28–33	21–21	25–33	25–27	—	26–29
AD Ciudad de Guadalajara	35–40	31–28	28–30	28–32	25–30	28–25	24–24	24–24	23–50	26–34	32–29	32–31	24–32	27–32	22–23	—

Legend: Blue = home team win; Yellow = draw; Red = away team win.

== Top goalscorers ==
Rank	Player	Club	Goals
1	(Portugal) Joaquim Nazaré	Incarlopsa Cuenca	192
2	(Spain) Antonio Martínez	Abanca Ademar León	188
3	(United States) Alexandre Chan	BM Cisne	183
4	(Spain) Antonio García	Fraikin BM Granollers	162
5	(Spain) Álvaro Martínez	Recoletas Atlético Valladolid	149
6	(Spain) Juan Castro	Abanca Ademar León	144
7	(France) Melvyn Richardson	FC Barcelona	140
8	(Spain) Jon Azkue	Bidasoa Irún	139
9	(Spain) Carlos Álvarez	BM Cisne	137
10	(Argentina) Ramiro Martínez	Club Balonmano Benidorm	132
