= Adam Savić =

Bosnian handball player

Personal information
- Born: 15 July 1986 (age 40) Tuzla, Bosnia and Herzegovina
- Height: 1.92 m (6 ft 4 in)

Sport
- Sport: Handball
- Position: Goalkeeper
- Current club: SCM Politehnica Timișoara
- Number: 12

Senior clubs
- Years: Team
- –: RK Banovići
- –: RK Sloboda Tuzla
- –: RK Konjuh Zivinice
- –: MRK Goražde
- 2013–2014: Gijón Jovellanos
- 2014–2015: BM Huesca
- 2015–2016: BM Sinfín
- 2016–: SCM Politehnica Timișoara
National team
- Years: Team
- –: Bosnia and Herzegovina

Adam Savić (born 15 July 1986) is a Bosnian handball player who plays as a goalkeeper for the Romanian club SCM Politehnica Timișoara and the Bosnia and Herzegovina national team.
