= Juan del Arco =

Spanish handball player (born 1991)

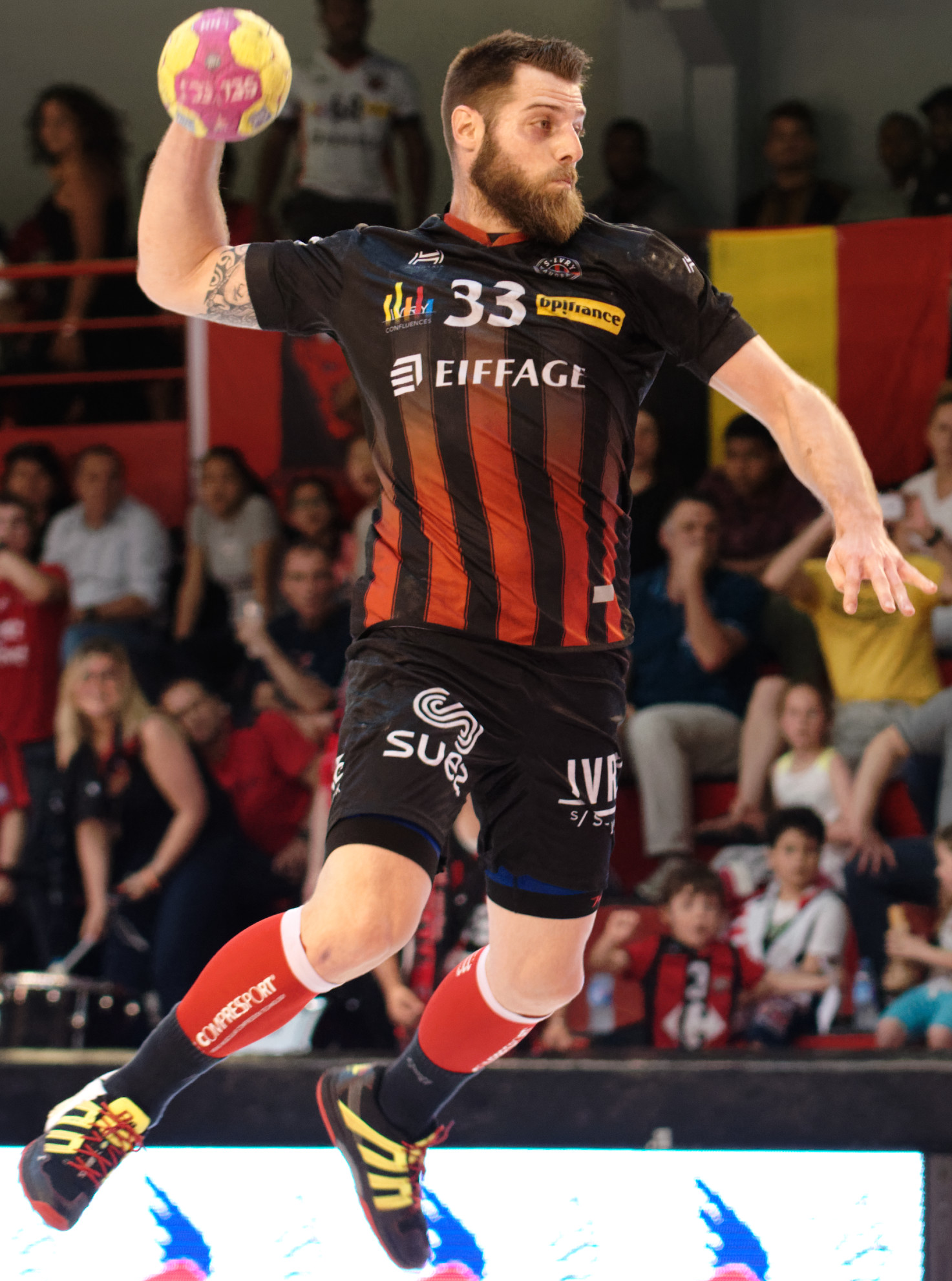
- del Arco playing for US Ivry in 2017

Personal information
- Full name: Juan del Arco Pérez
- Nationality: Spanish
- Born: 29 November 1991 (age 34) Leganés, Spain
- Height: 1.91 m (6 ft 3 in)

Sport
- Sport: Handball
- Position: Centre back
- Current club: Limoges Hand 87
- Number: 23

Senior clubs
- Years: Team
- –2015: (Spain) BM Granollers
- 2015–2016: (Qatar) El Jaish
- 2016–2017: (France) US Ivry
- 2017–2019: (Spain) BM Logroño La Rioja
- 2019–2020: Tremblay-en-France
- 2020: → (France) Limoges Hand 87
- 2020–2022: (Spain) Helvetia Anaitasuna
- 2022-2024: (Spain) Frigoríficos Morrazo Cangas
National team
Years	Team	Apps	(Gls)
2015–2016	Spain	15	(20)
Medal record
European Championship
Silver medal – second place	2016 Poland

Juan del Arco (born 29 November 1991) is a Spanish retired handball player who played the Spanish national team.

He debuted for the Spanish national team on June 10, 2015, versus Austria. He competed at the 2016 European Men's Handball Championship. After this tournament, he was not chosen for the Spanish team again.
