= 2010–11 División de Plata de Balonmano =

División de Plata
- Season: 2010–11
- Champions: Octavio Pilotes Posada
- Promoted: Octavio Pilotes Posada, Obearagón Huesca, Helvetia Anaitasuna
- Relegated: Universidad León Ademar, Grupo Pinta Torrelavega & HV Ingenieros Almoradí
- Matches: 240
- Goals: 13,751 (57.3 per match)

The 2010–11 season of the División de Plata de Balonmano is the 17th season of second-tier handball in Spain.

== Final standings ==
| Pos | Team | Pld | W | D | L | GF | GA | GD | Pts | Promotion or relegation |
|---|---|---|---|---|---|---|---|---|---|---|
| 1 | Octavio Pilotes Posada | 30 | 25 | 1 | 4 | 927 | 805 | +122 | 51 | Promoted |
| 2 | Obearagón Huesca | 30 | 20 | 4 | 6 | 902 | 836 | +66 | 44 | Play-offs for promotion |
| 3 | SD Teucro | 30 | 19 | 6 | 5 | 872 | 812 | +60 | 44 | Play-offs for promotion |
| 4 | Helvetia Anaitasuna | 30 | 18 | 4 | 8 | 939 | 828 | +111 | 40 | Play-offs for promotion |
| 5 | Frigorificos Morrazo Cangas | 30 | 18 | 2 | 10 | 873 | 809 | +64 | 38 | Play-offs for promotion |
| 6 | Barcelona B | 30 | 16 | 2 | 12 | 858 | 813 | +45 | 34 | |
| 7 | Pines Badajoz | 30 | 13 | 4 | 13 | 802 | 785 | +17 | 30 | |
| 8 | BM Barakaldo | 30 | 14 | 2 | 14 | 847 | 866 | −19 | 30 | |
| 9 | ARS Palmanaranja | 30 | 12 | 4 | 14 | 897 | 925 | −28 | 28 | |
| 10 | Artepref Villa de Aranda | 30 | 9 | 9 | 12 | 904 | 908 | −4 | 27 | |
| 11 | Adelma Sinfín | 30 | 11 | 4 | 15 | 826 | 868 | −42 | 26 | |
| 12 | PRASA Pozoblanco | 30 | 11 | 4 | 15 | 872 | 876 | −4 | 26 | |
| 13 | Bidasoa Irún | 30 | 7 | 7 | 16 | 827 | 870 | −43 | 21 | |
| 14 | Universidad de León Ademar | 30 | 8 | 4 | 18 | 895 | 948 | −53 | 20 | Relegated |
| 15 | Grupo Pinta Torrelavega | 30 | 7 | 5 | 18 | 781 | 835 | −54 | 19 | Relegated |
| 16 | H.V. Ingenieros Almoradí | 30 | 1 | 0 | 29 | 729 | 967 | −238 | 2 | Relegated |

=== Playoffs for promotion ===
The promotion playoffs will grant a seat in Liga ASOBAL for 2011–12 season.

==== Semifinals ====
| 28 May 2011; 18:00 | Obearagón Huesca | 37 – 34 | Frigorificos Morrazo | Palacio Municipal de Deportes, Huesca |
| 28 May 2011; 18:00 | | Report | | Palacio Municipal de Deportes, Huesca |

| 28 May 2011; 20:00 | Teucro | 25 – 41 | Helvetia Anaitasuna | Palacio Municipal de Deportes, Huesca |
| 28 May 2011; 20:00 | | Report | | Palacio Municipal de Deportes, Huesca |

==== Third place ====
| 29 May 2011; 10:15 | Frigorificos Morrazo | 24 – 29 | Teucro | Palacio Municipal de Deportes, Huesca |
| 29 May 2011; 10:15 | | Report | | Palacio Municipal de Deportes, Huesca |

==== Final ====
| 29 May 2011; 12:15 | Obearagón Huesca | 31 – 30 | Helvetia Anaitasuna | Palacio Municipal de Deportes, Huesca |
| 29 May 2011; 12:15 | | Report | | Palacio Municipal de Deportes, Huesca |

Finally both Obearagón Huesca and Helvetia Anaitasuna have been promoted to Liga ASOBAL 2011–12.
