= BM Huesca =

Spanish handball club

Bada Huesca
- Full name: Balonmano Huesca
- Founded: 1995; 31 years ago
- Arena: Palacio Municipal de Deportes, Huesca
- Capacity: 4,500
- President: Francisco Giné
- Head coach: José Francisco Nolasco
- League: Liga ASOBAL
- 2024-25: 13th
- Club colours
Home	Away

Bada Huesca is a team of handball based in Huesca, Spain. It plays in Liga ASOBAL.

Location of Bada Huesca

== History ==
The club handball section was established in 1995. The team has been playing continuously in the first division, the Liga ASOBAL, since 2011. The team played in an international cup (EHF Cup) once in the 2014/15 season.

== Crest, colours, supporters ==
=== Naming history ===
Name	Period
Club Balonmano Huesca	1995−1999
Adeslas Huesca	1999–2002
Forcusa Huesca	2002–2008
Obearagón Huesca	2008–2011
Club Balonmano Huesca	2011–2014
Bada Huesca	2014–present

=== Kits ===
HOME
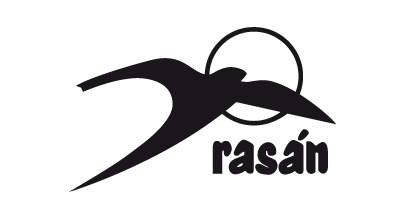
2012–15

== Sports Hall information ==
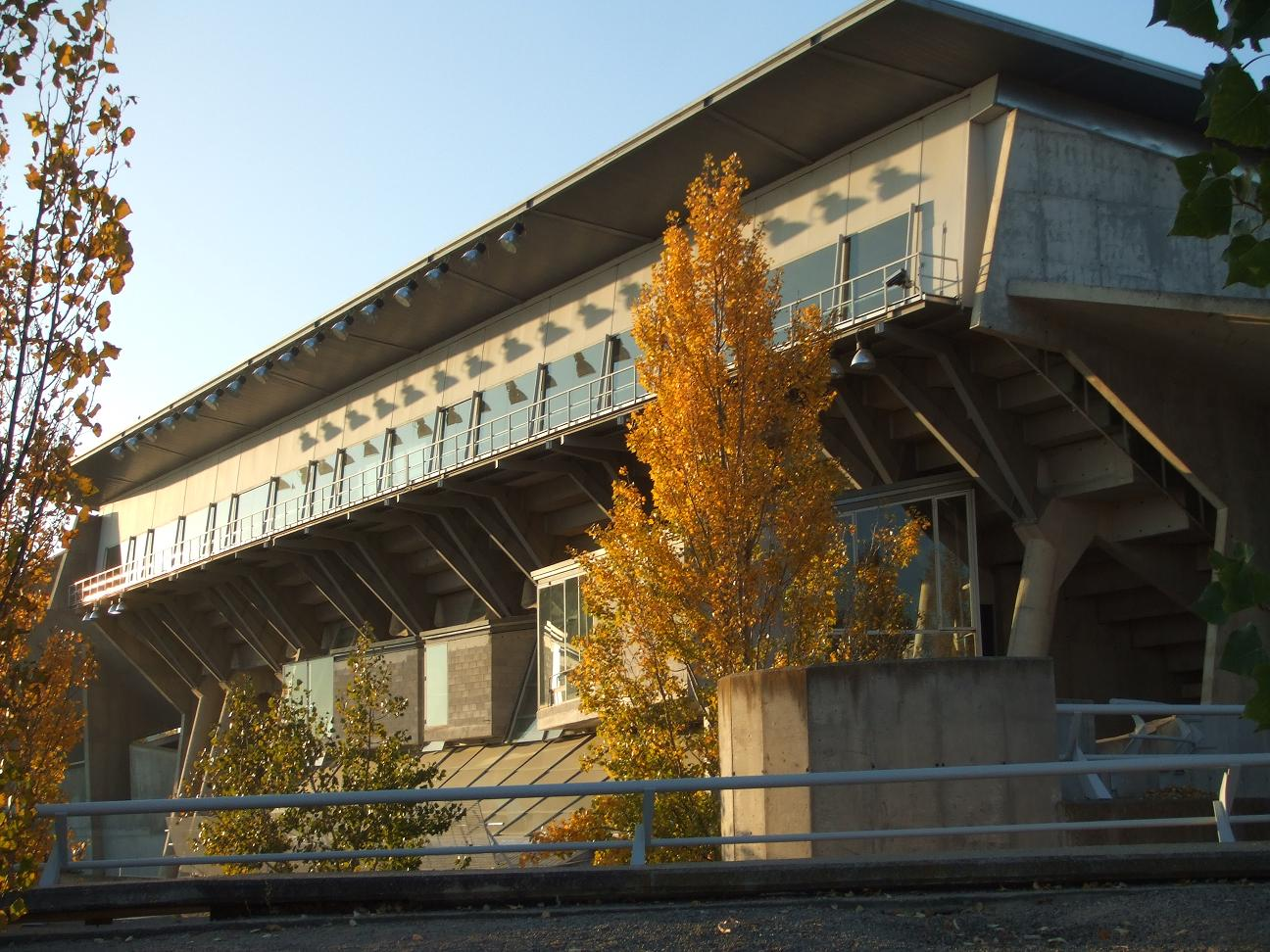
Home hall: Palacio Municipal de Deportes

- Name: – Palacio Municipal de Deportes
- City: – Huesca
- Capacity: – 4500
- Address: – Calle San Jorge, 76, 22003, Huesca, Spain

== Management ==
Position	Name
President	(Spain) Francisco Giné
Vice President	(Spain) José Ignacio Montorio
Vice President	(Spain) Daniel Ramírez
Vice President	(Spain) Pedro Luis Gómez
Club Manager	(Spain) Néstor Oliva

== Team ==
=== Current squad ===
Squad for the 2022–23 season

Bada Huesca

Goalkeepers

- 12 (Spain) Pablo Casterad
- 62 (Brazil) Leonardo Terçariol
- 92 (Canada) (Spain) Daniel Arguillas

Left Wingers

- 10 (Spain) Adria Perez Martinez
- 14 (Spain) Ian Moya

Right Wingers

- 7 (Spain) Gerard Carmona
- 77 (Brazil) Rudolph Hackbarth

Line Players

- 2 (Spain) Iván Montoya
- 23 (Brazil) Rodrigo Benites Díaz

Central Backs

- 15 (Spain) Ignacio Suárez Uribe-Echeverria
- 22 (Brazil) Diógenes Cruz
- 34 (Spain) Miguel Malo

Left Backs

- 25 (Slovenia) Janez Guček
- 27 (Cuba) Frank Cordiés
- 35 (Spain) José Jorge Floris Gonzalvo

Right Backs

- 13 (Spain) Domingo Luis Mosquera
- 21 (Spain) Pere Arnau
- 37 (Spain) Fran Rubio Sánchez

=== Technical staff ===
- Head coach: (Spain) José Francisco Nolasco
- Assistant coach: (Spain) Fernando Pérez Santolaria
- Assistant coach: (Spain) Lucas Calvo Sevilla
- Fitness coach: (Spain) Pedro Barrio Menoyo
- Physiotherapist: (Spain) Luisa Pérez Larre
- Physiotherapist: (Spain) Sergio Ferrer Leiva
- Club Doctor: (Spain) Martín Blecua Alonso

=== Transfers ===
Transfers for the 2026–27 season

Joining

- (Spain) José Andrés Torres (LP) from (Spain) CB Caserío Ciudad Real

Leaving

- (Cuba) Frank Cordiés (LB) to (Spain) Balonmano Torrelavega
- (Cuba) Samuel Cordiés (CB) to (Spain) BM Villa de Aranda
- (Tunisia) Fradj Ben Tekaya (GK) to (Romania) CSM Constanța
- (Hungary) Gábor Décsi (GK) to (Spain) BM Rebi Cuenca
- (Spain) Artur Parera (LP) to (Spain) BM Villa de Aranda
- (Spain) Ignacio Suárez Uribe-Echeverria (CB) to (Spain) BM Atlético Valladolid

=== Transfer History ===
Transfers for the 2025–26 season

Joining

- (Tunisia) Fradj Ben Tekaya (GK) from (Spain) Ángel Ximénez Puente Genil
- (Democratic Republic of the Congo) Aurélien Tchitombi (CB) from (Spain) BM Rebi Cuenca
- (Spain) Daniel Pérez Bravo (LW) from (Spain) BM Nava

Leaving

- (Canada) (Spain) Daniel Arguillas (GK) to (Spain) BM Rebi Cuenca
- (Spain) Miguel Malo (CB) to (Spain) CB Burgos

Transfers for the 2022–23 season

Joining

- (Brazil) Diógenes Cruz (CB) from (Spain) Balonmano Sinfín
- (Brazil) Leonardo Terçariol (GK) from (Spain) BM Logroño La Rioja
- (Spain) Ignacio Suárez Uribe-Echeverria (CB) from (Spain) CB Burgos
- (Cuba) Frank Cordiés (LB) from (Spain) BM Alarcos

Leaving

- (Spain) Sergio Pérez Manzanares (CB) to (France) Saint-Raphaël Var Handball
- (Spain) Asier Nieto Marcos (LB) to (Spain) Bidasoa Irún
- (Brazil) César Almeida (GK) to (France) Nancy Handball
- (Portugal) Joao Paulo de Sousa (LB) to (Spain) Helvetia Anaitasuna
- (Portugal) Miguel Lamelas Gomes (CB) to (Italy) Polisportiva Cingoli
- (Spain) Álex Marcelo (RW)

== Previous squads ==
2014–2015 Team
Shirt No	Nationality	Player	Birth Date	Position
3	Spain	Ander Ugarte Cortes	6 June 1990 (age 36)	Line Player
6	Spain	Javier Ancizu Garcia	7 June 1981 (age 45)	Left Winger
8	Spain	Abraham Rochel Icardo	22 April 1978 (age 48)	Central Back
9	Spain	Agustín Casado	21 May 1996 (age 30)	Central Back
12	Bosnia and Herzegovina	Adam Savić	15 July 1986 (age 40)	Goalkeeper
14	Spain	Mikel Muguerza Alvarez	14 April 1992 (age 34)	Right Back
16	Spain	Fernando Perez Santolaria	10 December 1980 (age 45)	Goalkeeper
17	Spain	Alex Marcelo Fuentes	20 February 1993 (age 33)	Right Back
18	Spain	Carlos Molina	31 May 1991 (age 35)	Left Back
19	Spain	Victor Melida Cambra	1 May 1992 (age 34)	Right Winger
20	Spain	Adrian Nolasco Macia	24 May 1993 (age 33)	Left Back
21	Spain	Antonio Cartón	21 March 1980 (age 46)	Right Winger
22	Spain	Pablo Hernandez Bermudez	29 July 1978 (age 48)	Goalkeeper
23	Spain	Marco Escribano Rodriguez	5 July 1992 (age 34)	Left Winger
25	Spain	Marco Mira Rasilla	19 February 1983 (age 43)	Left Back
26	Spain	Jose Juan Gonzalez Novelle	27 February 1986 (age 40)	Left Back
27	Serbia	Milan Rasic	16 May 1987 (age 39)	Line Player

== Season by season ==
Season	Tier	Division	Pos.	Notes
1995–1996	5	2ª Autonómica	1st	Promoted
1996–1997	4	2ª Nacional	2nd	Promoted
1997–1998	3	1ª Nacional	7th	
1998–1999	3	1ª Nacional	5th	
1999–2000	3	1ª Nacional	9th	
2000–2001	3	1ª Nacional	7th	
2001–2002	3	1ª Nacional	1st	
2002–2003	3	1ª Nacional	2nd	
2003–2004	3	1ª Nacional	2nd	Promoted
2004–2005	2	Honor B	8th	
2005–2006	2	Honor B	13th	
2006–2007	2	Honor B	5th	
2007–2008	2	Honor B	10th	
2008–2009	2	Honor B	13th	
2009–2010	2	Plata	7th	
2010–2011	2	Plata	2nd	Promoted

Season	Tier	Division	Pos.	Notes
2011–2012	1	ASOBAL	11th	
2012–2013	1	ASOBAL	8th	
2013–2014	1	ASOBAL	4th	
2014–2015	1	ASOBAL	9th	
2015–2016	1	ASOBAL	10th	
2016–2017	1	ASOBAL	7th	
2017–2018	1	ASOBAL	7th	
2018–2019	1	ASOBAL	6th	
2019–2020	1	ASOBAL	15th	
2020–2021	1	ASOBAL	5th	
2021–2022	1	ASOBAL	9th	
2022–2023	1	ASOBAL	11th	
2023–2024	1	ASOBAL	8th	
2024–2025	1	ASOBAL	13th	

== European competition ==
EHF Cup: It was formerly known as the IHF Cup until 1993. Also, starting from the 2012–13 season the competition has been merged with the EHF Cup Winners' Cup. The competition will be known as the EHF European League from the 2020–21 season.

As of 30 September 2022:

- Participations in EHF Cup: 1x

Season	Competition	Round	Club	Home	Away	Aggregate
2014–15	EHF Cup	Third round	(Sweden) Eskilstuna Guif	26–23	24–32	50–55

=== EHF ranking ===
As of 10/22/2026

Rank	Team	Points
268	(Belarus) HC Masheka	2
269	(Iceland) KA	2
270	(Poland) Unia Tarnów	2
271	(Spain) Bada Huesca	2
272	(Slovenia) RD Koper	1
273	(Lithuania) Granitas Kaunas	1
274	(Norway) Haslum HK	1

== Former club members ==
=== Notable former players ===
- (Spain) Álvaro Cabanas (2015-2016)
- (Spain) Agustín Casado (2014-2016)
- (Spain) Rodrigo Corrales (2012–2014)
- (Spain) Carlos Molina (2013–2015)
- (Spain) Asier Nieto Marcos (2018-2022)
- (Spain) Álvaro Ruiz Sánchez (2011–2013)
- (Spain) Joan Saubich (2009-2010, 2011-2013)
- (Argentina) Nicolás Bonanno (2016-2019)
- (Argentina) Gonzalo Carró (2016–2019)
- (Argentina) (Italy) Martín Ariel Doldan (2015–2016)
- (Argentina) Agustín Vidal (2009–2010)
- (Argentina) Federico Matías Vieyra (2011–2012)
- (Bosnia and Herzegovina) Adam Savić (2014–2015)
- (Brazil) César Almeida (2021-2022)
- (Brazil) Rudolph Hackbarth (2021-)
- (Brazil) Henrique Teixeira (2016–2018)
- (Brazil) Leonardo Terçariol (2022-)
- (Chile) Emil Feuchtmann (2006-2007)
- (Chile) Patricio Martínez Chávez (2000-2003, 2007-2009)
- (Chile) Rodrigo Salinas Muñoz (2010–2011)
- (Portugal) Miguel Espinha Ferreira (2020–2021)
- (Portugal) Filipe Mota (2018–2020)
- (Serbia) Dimitrije Pejanović (2015–2016)
- (Slovakia) Stanislav Demovič (2012-2013)

=== Former coaches ===
Seasons	Coach	Country
2010–	José Francisco Nolasco	(Spain)
