= Álvaro Ruiz Sánchez =

Spanish handball player (born 1991)

Álvaro Ruiz
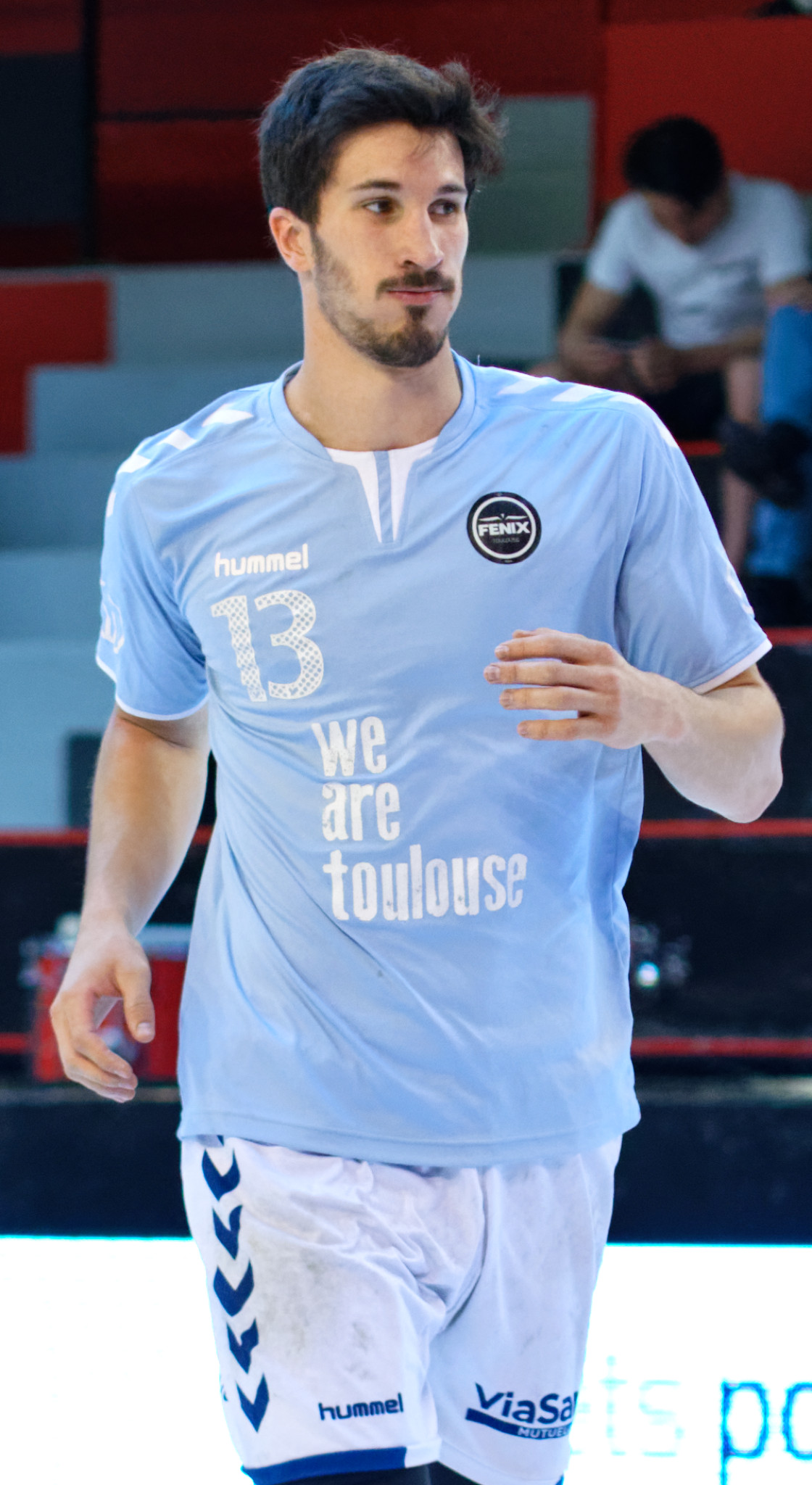

Personal information
- Full name: Álvaro Ruiz Sánchez
- Nationality: Spanish
- Born: 8 April 1991 (age 35) Almería, Spain
- Height: 1.94 m (6 ft 4 in)

Sport
- Sport: Handball
- Position: Centre back
- Current club: Orlen Wisła Płock
- Number: 13

Senior clubs
- Years: Team
- –2011: FC Barcelona
- 2011–2013: BM Huesca
- 2013–2015: BM Granollers
- 2015–2019: Fenix Toulouse
- 2019–2021: Orlen Wisła Płock
- 2021–: BM Benidorm
National team
Years	Team	Apps	(Gls)
2015–	Spain	6	(5)

Álvaro Ruiz (born 8 April 1991) is a Spanish handball player for Orlen Wisła Płock and the Spanish national team.
