= Lucas Moscariello =

Argentine handball player

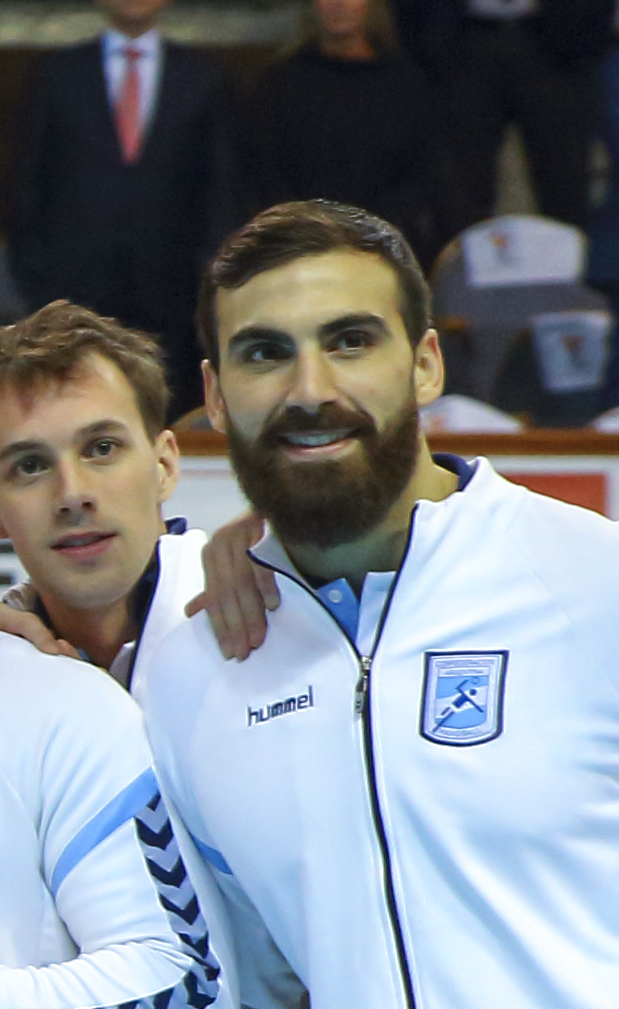

Personal information
- Full name: Lucas Dario Moscariello
- Born: 19 February 1992 (age 34) Buenos Aires, Argentina
- Height: 1.90 m (6 ft 3 in)

Sport
- Sport: Handball
- Position: Pivot
- Current club: BM Benidorm

Senior clubs
- Years: Team
- 2014–2015: Elite Val d'Oise
- 2015–2016: Billère Handball
- 2016–2018: BM Villa de Aranda
- 2018–2021: BM Ciudad Encantada
- 2021–2023: Montpellier Handball
- 2023–: BM Benidorm
National team
Years	Team	Apps	(Gls)
2016–	Argentina	120	(255)
Medal record
Pan American Games
Gold medal – first place	2019 Lima	Team
Pan American Championship
Gold medal – first place	2018 Greenland
South and Central American Championship
Gold medal – first place	2020 Brazil
Gold medal – first place	2026 Paraguay
Silver medal – second place	2022 Brazil
Silver medal – second place	2024 Argentina
South American Games
Gold medal – first place	2022 Asunción	Team
Silver medal – second place	2018 Cochabamba	Team
- Updated on 27 January 2025

Lucas Dario Moscariello (born 19 February 1992) is an Argentine handball player for BM Benidorm and the Argentine national team.

He participated at the 2017 World Men's Handball Championship.
