= Antonio Ugalde =

Spanish handball player (born 1976)

Personal information
- Full name: Antonio Ugalde García
- Born: 13 May 1976 (age 50) Esplugues de Llobregat, Spain
- Height: 1.87 m (6 ft 2 in)

Sport
- Sport: Handball
- Position: Left wing, Centerback

Youth career
- Years: Team
- –1994: BM Granollers

Senior clubs
- Years: Team
- 1994–2003: BM Granollers
- 2003–2005: CB Cangas
- 2005–2007: BM Valladolid
- 2007–2008: BM Ciudad de Almería
- 2008–2009: BM Atlético Boadilla
- 2009–2011: CB Cangas
National team
Years	Team	Apps	(Gls)
1997–2006	Spain	85	(143)
Medal record
Men's Handball
Bronze medal – third place	2000 Sydney	Team

Antonio Ugalde García (born May 13, 1976 in Esplugues de Llobregat, Barcelona) is a Spanish handball player. He competed in the 2000 Summer Olympics.

In 2000, Ugalde won the bronze medal with the Spanish team. He played five matches and scored eight goals.

== Private ==
His younger brother Cristian Ugalde is also a handball player.
