= José Oliver =

Puerto Rican/Catalan archaeologist (born 1954)

José R. Oliver
- Oliver at the Bow Hill, West Sussex excavations in West Sussex, southern England, directed by Mark Roberts, summer 2011.
- Born: José R. Oliver; 10/July/1954; San Juan, Puerto Rico
- Occupation: Archaeologist

José R. Oliver is a Puerto Rican/Catalan archaeologist who specialises in the archaeology of the Caribbean and northern South America. He is affiliated with the Institute of Archaeology at University College London in Bloomsbury, central London, where he works as Reader in Latin American Archaeology.

Born in Barcelona and raised in San Juan, Puerto Rico, Oliver went on to study anthropology in the United States, gaining his BA in the subject from Miami University in Oxford, Ohio in 1977. He subsequently went on to study at the University of Illinois in Urbana-Champaign, gaining his MA in 1981 and then his PhD in 1989. His most recent book, Caciques and Cemi Idols. The Web Spun by Taino Rulers between Hispaniola and Puerto Rico, was published in 2009.

Oliver directs a research project in the Dominican Republic entitled "The Macorix Archaeological Project". It includes a formal field school to train university-level students in collaboration with the Institute of Archaeology-UCL (London), the Museo del Hombre Dominicano (Santo Domingo, D.R.) and the Institute for Field Research (IFR), based in California, USA.
