= Nicolás Bonanno =

Argentine handball player (born 1991)

Personal information
- Born: 18 November 1991 (age 34) Marcos Paz, Argentina
- Height: 1.98 m (6 ft 6 in)

Sport
- Sport: Handball
- Position: Left back
- Current club: BM Huesca
- Number: 77
National team
Years	Team	Apps	(Gls)
–	Argentina	29	(32)
Medal record
Pan American Games
Gold medal – first place	2019 Lima	Team
Gold medal – first place	2023 Santiago	Team
Pan American Championship
Gold medal – first place	2018 Greenland
South and Central American Championship
Gold medal – first place	2020 Brazil
Silver medal – second place	2022 Brazil
Silver medal – second place	2024 Argentina
South American Games
Gold medal – first place	2022 Asunción	Team
Silver medal – second place	2018 Cochabamba	Team

Nicolás Bonanno (born 18 November 1991) is an Argentine handball player for BM Huesca and the Argentine national team.

He represented Argentina at the 2019 World Men's Handball Championship.
