= Gojko Vučinić =

Montenegrin handball player (1970–2021)

Gojko Vučinić (29 September 1970 in Cetinje, Montenegro – 14 April 2021 in Elgoibar, Spain) was a former Montenegrin handballer who stood 1.94 m tall and weighted 94 kg. He played for Arrate and Sanlo Elgoibar, as well as being a coach member of both teams for several years. He also played on the Montenegro men's national handball team. He died on 14 April 2021 in Elgoibar, Spain.
