= Jovan Kovačević =

Yugoslav historian and archaeologist (1920-1988)

- Јован Ковачевић
- Born: 5 February 1920; Paris, France
- Died: 13 January 1988; Belgrade, SR Serbia
- Occupations: Historian, archaeologist
- Years active: 1949–1988
- Known for: contributions to Serb medieval history and archaeology
- Title: Professor

Jovan Kovačević (Serbian: Јован Ковачевић) was a Yugoslav historian and archaeologist. Kovačević was born on 5 February 1920 in Paris, into a family of Belgrade intellectuals. He finished high school in Belgrade, and then began studying history in Berlin in 1939. Due to the outbreak of World War II, he continued his studies in 1946 in Belgrade. He originally worked as an assistant at the Art Museum in Belgrade (1944-1948), and then worked at the Institute of History. He received his doctoral science degree in 1951 and began working at the Faculty of Philosophy in Belgrade in 1954, then was elected assistant professor in the subject of Slavic archaeology. He was elected associate professor in 1960, and then in 1965 became a full professor. Meanwhile, in 1962 he founded the Department of Medieval Archaeology, which he held until his retirement in 1985. He was said to have been strict on exams. He was a member of various professional associations, both domestic and foreign. He was an editor in many scientific publications, and also participated in the compilation of the History of the Serbian People.

== Work ==
- Kovačević, Jovan (1949). "Белешке за проучавање Мирослављевог јеванђеља и материјалне културе XI-XII века". Историски часопис. 1 (1948): 90–102.
- Гарашанин, Милутин; Kovačević, Jovan (1950). Преглед материјалне културе Јужних Словена у раном средњем веку. Београд: Просвета.
- Kovačević, Jovan (1951). "Око Мирослављевог јеванђеља". Историски часопис. 2 (1949–1950): 90–102.
- Kovačević, Jovan (1953). Средњовековна ношња балканских Словена: Студија из историје средњовековне културе Балкана. Београд: Научна књига.
- Kovačević, Jovan (1953). Бој на Косову: Уторак, 15 јун 1389 године. Београд: Просвета.
- Kovačević, Jovan (1955). "Традиција о Дукљанском краљевству код Немањића". Историски часопис. 5 (1954–1955): 291–294.
- Kovačević, Jovan (1955). "Етничка и друштвена припадност ктитора у Дукљи и Поморју од краја VIII до краја XIII века". Историски гласник. 8 (2): 117–129.
- Kovačević, Jovan (1956). "О уводу Барског родослова". Зборник за друштвене науке. 13–14: 61–70.
- Kovačević, Jovan (1960). Arheologija i istorija varvarske kolonizacije južnoslovenskih oblasti od IV do početka VII veka. Novi Sad: Vojvođanski muzej.
- Kovačević, Jovan (1967). "Провинција Превалис" (PDF). Историја Црне Горе. Vol. 1. Титоград: Редакција за историју Црне Горе. pp. 241–277.
- Kovačević, Jovan (1967). "Од доласка Словена до краја XII вијека" (PDF). Историја Црне Горе. Vol. 1. Титоград: Редакција за историју Црне Горе. pp. 279–444.
- Kovačević, Jovan (1967). "Osnovni problemi srednjovekovne arheologije Crne Gore". Materijali IV: VII kongres arheologa Jugoslavije. Beograd-Titograd: Arheološko društvo Jugoslavije; Zavičajni muzej. pp. 39–48.
- Kovačević, Jovan (1972). "Sloveni i staro balkansko stanovništvo". Materijali IX: Simpozijum Srednjevekovne sekcije Arheološkog društva Jugoslavije. Beograd-Prilep: Arheološko društvo Jugoslavije; Narodni muzej. pp. 63–80.
- Kovačević, Jovan (1977). Аварски каганат [Avar Khaganate]. Београд: Српска књижевна задруга.
- Kovačević, Jovan (1977). "Пазариште, резултати досадашњих археолошких радова". Новопазарски зборник. 1: 5–13.
- Kovačević, Jovan (1981). "Досељење Словена на Балканско полуострво". Историја српског народа. Vol. 1. Београд: Српска књижевна задруга. pp. 109–124.

== See also ==
- List of Serbian historians

== Sources ==
- Ћирковић, Сима М.; Михальчић, Раде (1997). "Ковачевић, Јован". Енциклопедија српске историографије (in Serbian). Knowledge. ISBN 978-86-80269-35-1.
