= SCDR Anaitasuna =

Spanish handball club

- Full name: Sociedad Cultural Deportivo Recreativa Anaitasuna
- Nickname(s): Anaita, Anaitasunistas, Verdes, Verdiblancos
- Founded: 1956; 70 years ago
- Arena: Pabellón Anaitasuna, Pamplona
- Capacity: 3,000
- Head coach: Enrique Domínguez
- League: Liga ASOBAL
- 2024-25: 15th (relegated)
- Club colours
Home	Away

Sociedad Cultural Deportivo Recreativa Anaitasuna is a team of handball based in Pamplona, Spain. It plays in División de Plata de Balonmano, the second tier of Spanish handball.

Location of Helvetia Anaitasuna

== History ==
The club handball section was established in 1956. The team has been playing continuously in the first division, the Liga ASOBAL, since 2011. In 2016, he appeared in the final of the Copa del Rey and in 2017 in the final of the Supercopa ASOBAL, but both times they lost to the FC Barcelona team. The team played at the international level in the EHF Cup, was eliminated after the group stage in the 2015/16 and 2017/18 seasons, and reached the quarterfinals in 2016/17.

In the 2024-25 season the team was relegated after finishing 15th in the league table.

== Crest, colours, supporters ==
=== Kit manufacturers ===
Period	Kit manufacturer
2015	(Sweden) Salming
2015 - present	(Germany) Kempa

=== Kits ===
HOME
2014-15	2016–17	2021–22

AWAY
2012–15	2018–19

== Team ==
=== Current squad ===
Squad for the 2022–23 season

Helvetia Anaitasuna

Goalkeepers

- 1 (Spain) Iñaki Martínez
- 12 (Spain) Ander Martín Jaurrieta
- 16 (Spain) Marcos Cancio
- 87 (Argentina) Juan Bar

Left Wingers

- 7 (Spain) Martín Ganuza Jorge
- 17 (Spain) Carlos Chocarro
- 98 (Spain) Alejandro Ortiz Echavarri

Right Wingers

- 2 (Spain) Álvaro Gastón
- 18 (Spain) Xavier González
- 19 (Spain) Mikel Redondo

Line Players

- 3 (Spain) Antonio Bazán
- 13 (Spain) Aitor García Dúo
- 25 (Spain) Josu Arzoz

Central Backs

- 9 (Spain) Ibai Meoki
- 10 (Spain) Ander Torriko
- 14 (Spain) Pablo Itoiz
- 24 (Spain) Francisco Javier Castro
- 44 (Spain) Julen Elustondo

Left Backs

- 15 (Spain) Ernesto Goñi Macua
- 73 (Portugal) Joao Paulo de Sousa
- 77 (Argentina) Nicolás Bonanno

Right Backs

- 6 (Spain) Eduardo Fernández González
- 20 (Brazil) Arthur William De Souza Pereira

=== Technical staff ===
- Head coach: (Spain) Enrique Domínguez
- Assistant coach: (Spain) Pablo Galech
- Fitness coach: (Spain) Javier Angulo
- Physiotherapist: (Spain) Pablo Inchauspe
- Physiotherapist: (Spain) Josetxo Retegi
- Physiotherapist: (Spain) Elisa Arretxea
- Club doctor: (Spain) Mikel Moreno

=== Transfers ===
Transfers for the 2026–27 season

Joining

- (Spain) Eduardo Gurbindo (RB) from (Turkey) Beşiktaş JK
- (Spain) Antonio Bazán (LP) from (Spain) FC Barcelona

Leaving

- (Spain) Iker Aguilera (LB) to (Portugal) Póvoa AC

=== Transfer History ===
Transfers for the 2025–26 season

Joining

- (Bosnia and Herzegovina) Nikola Malivojević (LP) from (Slovakia) HT Tatran Prešov
- (Spain) Andoni Beraza (LB) from (Spain) CD Bidasoa
- (Spain) Iker Aguilera (LB) from (Spain) CB Alcobendas
- (Romania) Alin Cozmaciuc (GK) on loan from (Romania) Dinamo București

Leaving

- (Argentina) Nicolás Zungri (RB) to (Spain) BM Puerto Sagunto
- (Spain) Xavier González (RW) to (Spain) CD Bidasoa
- (Spain) Aitor Albizu (CB) to (Spain) CB Ademar León
- (Spain) Marcos Cancio (GK) to (Spain) CB Ciudad de Logroño
- (Spain) Aitor García Dúo (LP) to (Spain) CB Ciudad de Logroño
- (Spain) Josu Arzoz (LP) to (Spain) Club Balonmano Nava
- (Spain) Daniel Santamaría (GK) to (Spain) CB Burgos
- (Spain) Alonso Moreno Guirao (RB) to (Spain) CB Caserío Ciudad Real
- (Spain) Samuel Pereiro (LB) to (Spain) CB Cangas
- (Spain) Pablo Castro Chapela (LP) to (Spain) CB Cangas
- (Spain) Ernesto Goñi Macua (LB) to (France) ASPTT Mulhouse/Rixheim
- (Spain) Martín Ganuza Jorge (LW) to (Spain) AD Ciudad de Guadalajara

Transfers for the 2022–23 season

Joining

- (Portugal) Joao Paulo de Sousa (LB) from (Spain) BM Huesca
- (Spain) Francisco Javier Castro (CB) from (Spain) Balonmano Sinfín
- (Spain) Ernesto Goñi Macua (LB) from (Spain) CB Ciudad de Logroño
- (Spain) Julen Elustondo (CB) from (Spain) BM Villa de Aranda
- (Croatia) Niko Martinović (CB) from (Croatia) Rukometni klub Zadar 1954

Leaving

- (Spain) Juan del Arco (CB) to (Spain) CB Cangas
- (Spain) Ander Izquierdo (CB) to (Portugal) S.L. Benfica
- (Spain) Héctor González Díaz (CB) to (France) Billère Handball
- (Spain) Adrián Ortiz Echavarri (LW) to (Spain) CB Caserío
- (Spain) Xabier Etxeberria Uriz (RW) (retires)
- (Russia) Pavel Bulkin (LB)

== Previous Squads ==
2016–2017 Team
Shirt No	Nationality	Player	Birth Date	Position
1	Spain	Javier Labairu Elizalde	19 September 1991 (age 35)	Goalkeeper
2	Spain	Álvaro Gastón	27 August 1993 (age 33)	Right Winger
3	Spain	Antonio Bazán	19 May 1996 (age 30)	Line Player
6	Spain	Alejandro Garza Hernandez	3 March 1986 (age 40)	Line Player
7	Spain	Alvaro Del Valle Navasa	21 January 1994 (age 32)	Right Back
8	Spain	Xabier Etxeberria Uriz	8 October 1991 (age 35)	Right Winger
9	Spain	Inaki Astrain Alonso	26 January 1996 (age 30)	Left Back
10	Portugal	Filipe Mota	7 May 1984 (age 42)	Central Back
13	Serbia	Bozidar Nadoveza	16 May 1981 (age 45)	Left Back
14	Spain	Ander Adarraga Lecumberri	14 October 1995 (age 31)	Central Back
15	Spain	Oleg Kisselev Kisseleva	2 August 1997 (age 29)	Left Back
17	Spain	Carlos Chocarro	29 July 1985 (age 41)	Left Winger
18	Spain	Inigo Barricart Dorval	30 August 1995 (age 31)	Left Winger
19	Brazil	Gabriel Ceretta	12 June 1997 (age 29)	Right Winger
20	Spain	Miguel Goñi Arraras	7 May 1981 (age 45)	Left Winger
21	Spain	Mikel Aguirrezabalaga	8 April 1984 (age 42)	Left Back
22	Spain	Fermin Iturri Bandres	18 June 1995 (age 31)	Line Player
23	Spain	Erik Balenciaga	10 May 1993 (age 33)	Central Back
24	Spain	Ander Ugarte Cortes	6 June 1990 (age 36)	Line Player
25	Spain	Sergey Hernández	17 June 1995 (age 31)	Goalkeeper
26	Brazil	Oswaldo Guimarães	23 October 1989 (age 37)	Right Back
31	Spain	Jokin Jimenez Eneriz	19 September 1995 (age 31)	Line Player
33	Sweden	Henrik Nordlander	16 March 1992 (age 34)	Goalkeeper

== Season by season ==
Season	Tier	Division	Pos.	Notes
1990–91	2	1ª Nacional	6th (Group I)	
1991–92	2	1ª Nacional	1st (Group II)	
1992–93	2	1ª Nacional	1st (Group II)	
1993–94	2	1ª Nacional	1st (Group II)	
1994–95	2	Honor B	8th	
1995–96	2	Honor B	9th	
1996–97	2	Honor B	10th	
1997–98	2	Honor B	10th	
1998–99	2	Honor B	3rd / 9th	
1999–00	2	Honor B	7th / 4th	
2000–01	2	Honor B	12th	
2001–02	2	Honor B	12th	
2002–03	2	Honor B	16th	Relegated
2003–04	3	1ª Estatal	6th	

Season	Tier	Division	Pos.	Notes
2004–05	3	1ª Estatal	1st	
2005–06	3	1ª Estatal	1st	Promoted
2006–07	2	Honor B	12th	
2007–08	2	Honor B	6th	
2008–09	2	Honor B	2nd	
2009–10	2	Plata	3rd	
2010–11	2	Plata	4th	Promoted
2011–12	1	ASOBAL	12th	
2012–13	1	ASOBAL	7th	
2013–14	1	ASOBAL	7th	
2014–15	1	ASOBAL	4th	
2015–16	1	ASOBAL	8th	
2016–17	1	ASOBAL	5th	

== European record ==
Season	Competition	Round	Club	1st leg	2nd leg	Aggregate
2016–17	EHF Cup	R3	(Hungary) Csurgói KK	27–21	26–30	53–51
2016–17	EHF Cup	Group Stage	(Germany) MT Melsungen	23–22	22–28	2nd place
2016–17	EHF Cup	Group Stage	(Portugal) S.L. Benfica	35–28	28–33	2nd place
2016–17	EHF Cup	Group Stage	(Finland) Riihimäki Cocks	30–24	33–28	2nd place
2016–17	EHF Cup	QF	(Germany) SC Magdeburg	27–34	32–35	59–69

== EHF ranking ==
As of 14/12/2022

Rank	Team	Points
178	(Montenegro) RK Lovćen	19
179	(Poland) Unia Tarnów	19
180	(Switzerland) BSV Bern	19
181	(Spain) Helvetia Anaitasuna	19
182	(Finland) HC Dicken	18
183	(Cyprus) APOEL Nicosia HC	18
184	(Bulgaria) HC Lokomotiv Gorna Oryahovitsa	18

== Former club members ==
=== Notable former players ===
- (Spain) Mikel Aguirrezabalaga (2016–2019)
- (Spain) Antonio Bazán (2013–)
- (Spain) Alejandro Costoya (2014–2016)
- (Spain) Juan del Arco (2020-2022)
- (Spain) Sergey Hernández (2013–2018)
- (Spain) Ander Izquierdo (2018–2022)
- (Spain) Niko Mindegía (2007-2008)
- (Argentina) Juan Bar (2021-)
- (Argentina) Nicolás Bonanno (2021-)
- (Argentina) Juan Pablo Fernández (2010–2011)
- (Argentina) Guillermo Fischer (2019-2021)
- (Argentina) Matías Schulz (2008–2009, 2011–2013)
- (Austria) Damir Djukic (2011)
- (Brazil) Gabriel Ceretta (2016–2019)
- (Brazil) Oswaldo Guimarães (2016–2018)
- (Brazil) Anderson Mollino (2019–2020)
- (Brazil) Raul Nantes (2017–2019)
- (Cape Verde) Leandro Semedo (2019-2020)
- (Lithuania) Rolandas Bernatonis (2011–2014)
- (Portugal) Filipe Mota (2016–2018)
- (Russia) Ruslan Dashko (2020–2021)
- (Slovenia) Gregor Lorger (2014–2017)
- (Slovakia) Stanislav Demovič (2007–2009)
- (Sweden) Henrik Nordlander (2016–2018)
- (Uruguay) (Spain) Máximo Cancio (2010–2012)
- (Venezuela) Eduardo Salazar (2018–2019)

=== Former coaches ===
Seasons	Coach	Country
2018–2020	Íñaki Añiz	(Spain)
2020–	Enrique Domínguez	(Spain)
