= CB Cangas =

Spanish handball club

Frigoríficos del Morrazo
- Full name: Club Balonmán Cangas Frigoríficos Morrazo
- Nickname: Frigoríficos
- Founded: 1961; 65 years ago
- Arena: Pabellón Municipal O Gatañal
- Capacity: 2,500
- President: Manuel Camiña
- Head coach: Nacho Moyano
- League: Liga ASOBAL
- 2024-25: 11th
- Club colours
Home	Away

Club Balonmán Cangas Frigoríficos Morrazo is a team of handball based in Cangas, Spain. It plays in Liga ASOBAL.

Location of CB Cangas

== History ==
The team, founded in 1961, reached the Spanish first division, Liga ASOBAL, for the first time in 1995. It was there without interruption until 2006. The club made two appearances in Europe's number two cup, the EHF Cup, in the 2005/06 and 2015/16 seasons.

== Sports Hall information ==
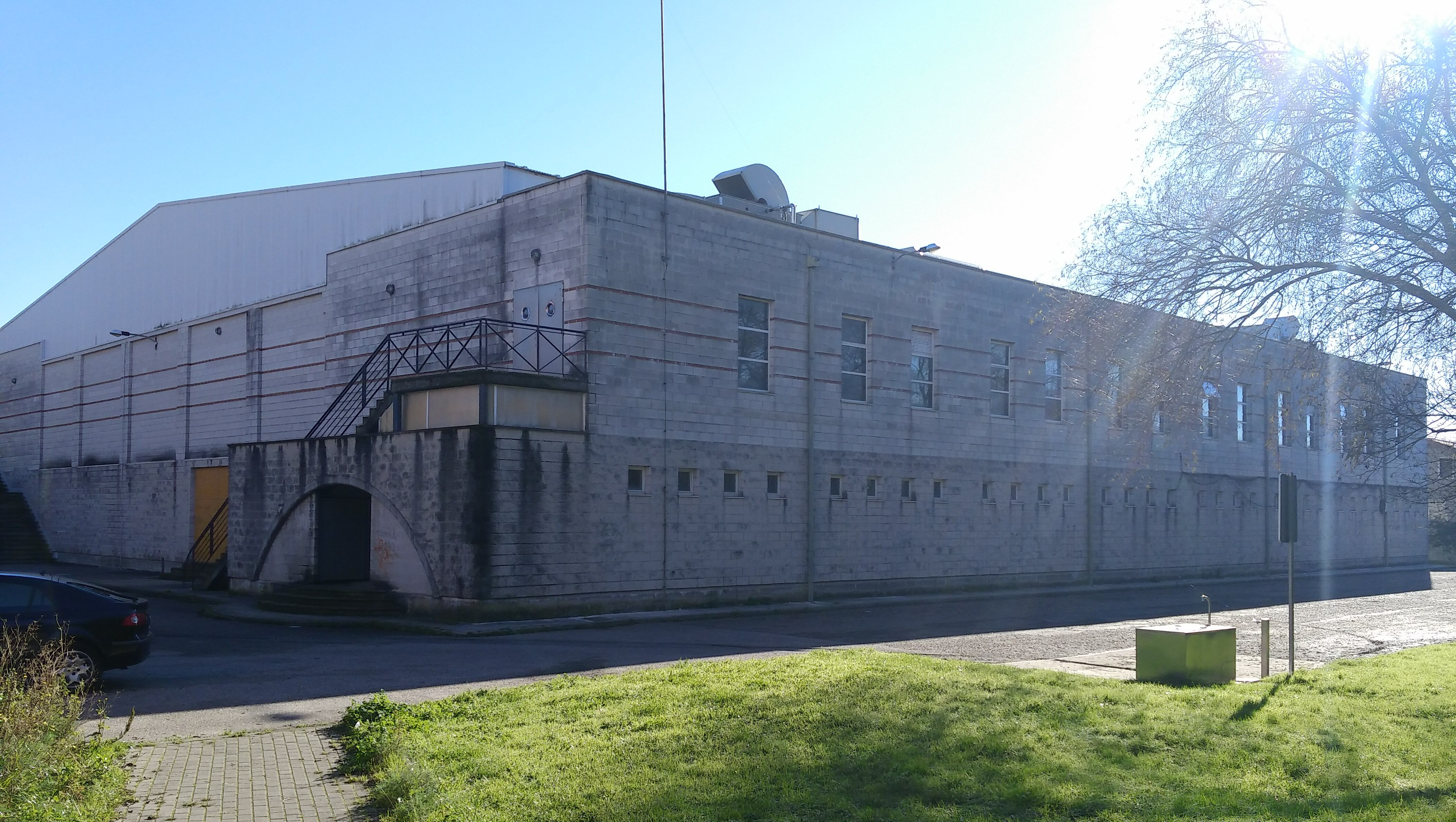
Home hall: Pabellón Municipal O Gatañal

- Name: – Pabellón Municipal O Gatañal
- City: – Cangas
- Capacity: – 2500
- Address: – Carretera Cangas - Aldan, s/n, 36940, Cangas, Spain

== Team ==
=== Current squad ===
Squad for the 2022–23 season

CB Cangas

Goalkeepers

- 1 (Spain) Javier Díaz Pérez
- 12 (Spain) Javier Fernández Gallego
- 36 (Spain) Gerard Forns

Left Wingers

- 3 (Spain) Moisés Simes
- 34 (Spain) Mario Dorado

Right Wingers

- 51 (Portugal) Jenilson Monteiro
- 57 (Spain) Gael Blanco

Line Players

- 10 (Spain) Juan Carlos Quintas
- 20 (Uruguay) Gabriel Chaparro
- 33 (Spain) Alberto Martín Botet

Central Backs

- 4 (Spain) Brais González
- 7 (Spain) Rubén Soliño
- 17 (Spain) Manuel Pérez Mateos
- 18 (Hungary) Rajmond Tóth
- 28 (Spain) Ignacio Salgado
- 39 (Spain) Juan del Arco
- 44 (Spain) Santiago López García

Left Backs

- 25 (Romania) Rares-Marian Fodorean

Right Backs

- 14 (Spain) Martín Gayo
- 71 (Spain) Carlos Vilanova García
- 77 (Argentina) Lucas Aizen

=== Technical staff ===
- Head coach: (Spain) Nacho Moyano
- Assistant coach: (Argentina) Felipe Verde
- Fitness coach: (Spain) Cuco Rodríguez
- Physiotherapist: (Spain) Serxio Lemos
- Club Doctor: (Spain) Manuel Caeiro

=== Transfers ===
Transfers for the 2026–27 season

Joining

- (Bosnia and Herzegovina) Nemanja Peštić (LB) from (Spain) BM Logroño La Rioja
- (Denmark) Pelle Boesen (CB) from (Norway) ØIF Arendal
- (Spain) Hugo Vila (RW) from (Spain) BM Benidorm

Leaving

- (Italy) Nicolo D'Antino (RW) to (Spain) BM Logroño La Rioja
- (Spain) Javier Fernández Gallego (GK) to (Spain) SD Atlético Novás

=== Transfer History ===
Transfers for the 2025–26 season

Joining

- (Italy) Nicolo D'Antino (RW) from (Spain) Recoletas Atlético Valladolid
- (Cuba) Ángel Jesús Rivero Noris (RB) from (Spain) CB Ciudad de Logroño
- (Montenegro) Haris Suljević (GK) from (Bosnia and Herzegovina) RK Izviđač
- (Croatia) Ivan Panjan (GK) from (France) Nancy Handball
- (Norway) David Valderhaug (LB) from (Norway) Haslum HK
- (Hungary) Marcell Ludmán (LB) from (Hungary) NEKA
- (Spain) Samuel Pereiro (LB) from (Spain) Helvetia Anaitasuna
- (Spain) Pablo Castro Chapela (LP) from (Spain) Helvetia Anaitasuna

Leaving

- (Montenegro) Haris Suljević (GK) to (Croatia) RK Zagreb
- (Denmark) Mads Thymann (LB) to (Denmark) Lemvig-Thyborøn Håndbold
- (Hungary) Rajmond Tóth (CB) to (Spain) BM Rebi Cuenca
- (Romania) Rares-Marian Fodorean (LB) to (Spain) Recoletas Atlético Valladolid
- (Egypt) Omar Sherif Abdelaziz (LP) to (Spain) CB Caserío Ciudad Real
- (Egypt) Mohammed Essam Mourad Abdelsadek (LP) to (Greece) A.C. PAOK
- (Spain) Jorge Pérez Molina (GK) to (France) Saint-Raphaël Var Handball
- (Spain) Brais González (CB) to (Spain) Club Balonmano Nava
- (Spain) Gael Blanco (RW) to (Spain) OAR BM Coruña
- (Serbia) Luka Krivokapić (GK) loan back to (Germany) TVB Stuttgart

Transfers for the 2022–23 season

Joining

- (Spain) Juan del Arco (CB) from (Spain) Helvetia Anaitasuna
- (Spain) Mario Dorado (LW) from (Spain) BM Logroño La Rioja
- (Uruguay) Gabriel Chaparro (LP) from (Spain) Atlético Novás
- (Romania) Rares-Marian Fodorean (LB) from (Portugal) Póvoa Andebol Clube
- (Hungary) Rajmond Tóth (CB) from (Hungary) Budakalász FKC

Leaving

- (Spain) Daniel Fernández (LW) to (Germany) TVB 1898 Stuttgart
- (Spain) Carles Asensio (LP) to (Germany) GWD Minden
- (Spain) David Iglesias Estévez (LB) to (France) Limoges Handball
- (Spain) Adrián Menduiña (RW) (retires)

== Previous Squads ==
2015–2016 Team
Shirt No	Nationality	Player	Birth Date	Position
1	Venezuela	Eduardo Salazar	4 August 1993 (age 33)	Goalkeeper
3	Spain	Moisés Simes	20 October 1988 (age 38)	Left Winger
5	Spain	Serafin Pousada Magdaleno	20 March 1988 (age 38)	Right Back
7	Spain	Rubén Soliño	29 August 1989 (age 37)	Central Back
8	Spain	Jesús Soliño	20 July 1975 (age 51)	Right Winger
10	Spain	Daniel Gómez Gómez	21 October 1993 (age 33)	Line Player
11	Spain	Alberto Casares Suárez	9 September 1991 (age 35)	Central Back
12	Spain	Anxo Dopazo Entenza	8 April 1996 (age 30)	Goalkeeper
13	Spain	Fernando Eijo Diaz	22 July 1980 (age 46)	Line Player
18	Spain	Eloy Krook Castaño	13 September 1991 (age 35)	Left Back
19	Spain	Paulo Da Costa Flores	4 July 1989 (age 37)	Left Winger
20	Spain	Daniel Cerqueira Rodriguez	17 September 1984 (age 42)	Line Player
21	Spain	Adrian Rosales Pousada	28 July 1985 (age 41)	Left Back
24	Montenegro	Alen Muratović	23 October 1979 (age 47)	Left Back
25	Spain	David García Barreiro	21 September 1988 (age 38)	Central Back
29	Spain	Yeray Lamariano	11 March 1983 (age 43)	Goalkeeper
81	Spain	Pablo Castro Chapela	18 October 1996 (age 30)	Line Player

2005–2006 Team
Shirt No	Nationality	Player	Birth Date	Position
1	Croatia	Venio Losert	25 July 1976 (age 50)	Goalkeeper
3	Slovenia	Mitja Lesjak	2 September 1979 (age 47)	Line Player
4	Spain	Santiago Gallego Malvido	4 May 1981 (age 45)	Line Player
5	Spain	Serafin Pousada Magdaleno	20 March 1988 (age 38)	Right Back
7	Spain	Francisco Cano Arjona	24 August 1978 (age 48)	Right Back
8	Spain	Jesús Soliño	20 July 1975 (age 51)	Right Winger
9	Spain	Marc Amargant	29 June 1976 (age 50)	Left Back
10	Spain	Eduardo Moledo Tourino	28 May 1987 (age 39)	Right Winger
13	Spain	Fernando Eijo Diaz	22 July 1980 (age 46)	Line Player
14	Serbia	Tihomir Doder	8 August 1979 (age 47)	Central Back
15	Spain	Pablo Sanchez Gonzales	25 May 1980 (age 46)	Left Winger
16	Spain	David Enriquez Gavilan	14 May 1981 (age 45)	Goalkeeper
17	Spain	Guillermo Redondo Torrecilla	5 March 1987 (age 39)	Line Player
18	Spain	Ismael Martinez Gonzalez	20 January 1983 (age 43)	Right Back
19	Spain	Tomas Fontan Carames	14 February 1977 (age 49)	Left Back
21	Spain	Adrian Rosales Pousada	28 July 1985 (age 41)	Left Back
77	Serbia	Ivan Smigic	23 September 1979 (age 47)	Central Back

== Season by season ==
Season	Tier	Division	Pos.	Notes
1990–91	3	1ª Nacional "B"	2nd (Group I)	Promoted
1991–92	2	1ª Nacional	7th (Group I)	
1992–93	2	1ª Nacional	3rd (Group I)	
1993–94	2	1ª Nacional	2nd (Group I)	Promoted
1994–95	2	Honor B	3rd	Promoted
1995–96	1	ASOBAL	13th	
1996–97	1	ASOBAL	10th	
1997–98	1	ASOBAL	13th	
1998–99	1	ASOBAL	12th	
1999–00	1	ASOBAL	9th	
2000–01	1	ASOBAL	13th	
2001–02	1	ASOBAL	13th	
2002–03	1	ASOBAL	12th	

Season	Tier	Division	Pos.	Notes
2003–04	1	ASOBAL	12th	
2004–05	1	ASOBAL	8th	
2005–06	1	ASOBAL	16th	Relegated
2006–07	2	Honor B	6th	
2007–08	2	Honor B	8th	
2008–09	2	Honor B	5th	Promoted
2009–10	1	ASOBAL	16th	Relegated
2010–11	2	Plata	5th	
2011–12	2	Plata	3rd	Promoted
2012–13	1	ASOBAL	14th	
2013–14	1	ASOBAL	10th	
2014–15	1	ASOBAL	5th	
2015–16	1	ASOBAL	6th	
2016–17	1	ASOBAL	14th	

== European competition ==
EHF Cup: It was formerly known as the IHF Cup until 1993. Also, starting from the 2012–13 season the competition has been merged with the EHF Cup Winners' Cup. The competition will be known as the EHF European League from the 2020–21 season.

As of 30 September 2022:

- Participations in EHF Cup: 2x

Season	Competition	Round	Club	Home	Away	Aggregate
2005–06	EHF Cup	Third round	(Denmark) Viborg HK	29–27	20–32	49–59
2015–16	EHF Cup	Third round	(Romania) CSM București	29–29	24–31	53–60

=== EHF ranking ===
As of 14/12/2022

Rank	Team	Points
271	(Romania) CSM Bacău	4
272	(Moldova) HC Olimpus-85 Chișinău	4
273	(Spain) CB Cangas	4
274	(England) Olympia HC	4
275	(Russia) HC Kaustik Volgograd	4
276	(Sweden) Eskilstuna Guif	4

== Former club members ==
=== Notable former players ===
- (Spain) Juan Francisco Alemany (1999–2001)
- (Spain) Vicente Álamo (2000–2002)
- (Spain) Marc Amargant (2005–2006)
- (Spain) Juan del Arco (2022–)
- (Spain) Daniel Fernández (2020–2022)
- (Spain) Rubén Garabaya (1999–2001)
- (Spain) Yeray Lamariano (2015–2016)
- (Spain) Antonio Ugalde (2003–2005, 2009–2011)
- (Austria) (Slovenia) Mare Hojc (2006–2007)
- (Chile) Patricio Martínez Chávez (2004-2005)
- (Chile) (Italy) Marco Oneto (2002–2005)
- (Croatia) Venio Losert (2005–2006)
- (Denmark) Kasper Hvidt (1997-1998)
- (France) Frédéric Louis (2007–2008)
- (France) Bruno Martini (1998–1999)
- (France) (Morocco) Seufyann Sayad (2006–2007)
- (South Korea) Kim Sung-Heon (2002–2003)
- (Montenegro) Marko Lasica (2010–2013)
- (Montenegro) Mile Mijušković (2013–2015)
- (Montenegro) Alen Muratović (2003–2005, 2013–2021)
- (Montenegro) Gojko Vučinić (2001)
- (Montenegro) Filip Vujović (2016–2020)
- (Portugal) Miguel Baptista (2020–2021)
- (Slovenia) Nenad Bilbija (2005–2006)
- (Slovenia) Borut Oslak (2008–2010)
- (Serbia) Tihomir Doder (2005–2006, 2007–2011, 2019–2020)
- (Serbia) Jovan Kovačević (1998–1999)
- (Slovakia) Stanislav Demovič (1999-2000)
- (Ukraine) Oleksandr Hladun (1997)
- (Uruguay) (Spain) Máximo Cancio (2017–2019)
- (Uruguay) Gabriel Chaparro (2022–)
- (Venezuela) Eduardo Salazar (2013-2018)

=== Former coaches ===
Seasons	Coach	Country
2017–2019	Magí Serra Cortina	(Spain)
2019–	Nacho Moyano	(Spain)
