= BM Benidorm =

Spanish handball club

- Full name: Club Balonmano Benidorm
- Nickname(s): Blanquiazules, Azulones, Azules
- Founded: 1994; 32 years ago
- Arena: Pabellón Liliana Fernández Steiner
- Capacity: 3,000
- President: Jacobo Balongo
- Head coach: Marko Krivokapic
- League: Liga ASOBAL
- 2024–25: 16th (relegated)
- Club colours
Home	Away

TM Benidorm is a team of handball based in Benidorm, Spain. It plays in División de Plata de Balonmano, the second tier of Spanish handball.

Location of BM Benidorm

== History ==
The current club was founded in 1994. In May 2014, they were promoted to Liga ASOBAL, in which the team has been playing ever since. In 2020, the team played in the final of the Copa del Rey, and in 2021 they also reached the final of the Supercopa ASOBAL. Internationally, the team played in the 2020/21 EHF European League.

In the 2024–25 season the team was relegated after finishing last in the league table.

== Crest, colours, supporters ==
=== Kits ===
HOME

2014–15

== Management ==
Position	Name
President	(Spain) Jacobo Balongo
Member Of The Board	(Spain) Jose Sanchis
Member Of The Board	(Spain) Vanesa Lerma
Member Of The Board	(Spain) María del Mar Hernández
Member Of The Board	(Spain) Jose Vicente Ferrer
Member Of The Board	(Spain) Jose Antonio Villalgordo

== Team ==
=== Current squad ===
Squad for the 2022–23 season

TM Benidorm

Goalkeepers

- 1 (Spain) Miquel Alvado
- 12 (Spain) Roberto Domènech
- 99 (Poland) Krystian Witkowski

Left Wingers

- 13 (Serbia) Tommaso de Angelis
- 20 (Serbia) Ramiro Martinez
- 21 (Spain) Nikolas Zarikos

Right Wingers

- 22 (Spain) Hugo Vila
- 20 (Argentina) Ramiro Martínez

Line Players

- 11 (Argentina) Lucas Moscariello
- 8 (Spain) Jose Oliver
- 9 (Spain) Bryan Pedraza
- 10 (Spain) Daniel Zhurkov

Central Backs

- 19 (Spain) Juan Carlos Sempere
- 23 (Serbia) Mirko Durovic
- 34 (Spain) Nacho Valles

Left Backs

- 4 (Lithuania) Pablo Agulló
- 14 (Spain) Jaume Planelles
- 18 (Spain) Leo Alonso
- 24 (Spain) Matias Canellas
- 53 (Portugal) Joao Bandeira Lorenço

Right Backs

- 5 (Argentina) Pablo Vanstein
- 55 (Spain) David Roca Rodríguez
- 93 (France) Mane Abdoulah

=== Technical staff ===
- Head Coach: (Serbia) Marko Krivokapic
- Fitness Coach: (Spain) Isidre Perez Marin

=== Transfers ===
Transfers for the 2026–27 season

Joining

- (Argentina) Lucas Aizen (RB) from (Spain) Ángel Ximénez Puente Genil
- (Spain) Vicente Poveda (LB) from (Spain) BM Villa de Aranda

Leaving

- (Spain) Hugo Vila (RW) to (Spain) CB Cangas
- (Spain) Juan Carlos Sempere (CB) to (Spain) CB Eón Alicante
- (Serbia) Uroš Ostojić (LB) loan back to (Spain) BM Villa de Aranda

=== Transfer History ===
Transfers for the 2025–26 season

Joining

- (Angola) Feliciano Couveiro (RB) from (Romania) HC Odorheiu Secuiesc
- (Togo) Abdoula Modi (LP) from (Spain) CB Ciudad de Logroño
- (Spain) David Mach Eijo (GK) from (Spain) BM Rebi Cuenca
- (Spain) Marc López Lozano (LB) from (Spain) Balonmano Sinfín
- (Spain) Pol Roy Trullols (LW) from (Spain) BM Villa de Aranda
- (Spain) Carlos Fernández Sánchez (LB) from (Spain) CB Eón Alicante
- (Serbia) Uroš Ostojić (LB) on loan from (Spain) BM Villa de Aranda

Leaving

- (Argentina) Lucas Moscariello (LP) to (Kuwait) Al-Arabi SC
- (Italy) Tommaso De Angelis (LW) to (Italy) Pallamano Cologne
- (Serbia) Mirko Djurović (CB) to (Italy) Pallamano Conversano
- (Poland) Krystian Witkowski (GK) to (Poland) Stal Mielec
- (Spain) Roberto Domènech (GK) to (Spain) CB Eón Alicante
- (Spain) David Roca Rodríguez (RB) to (Spain) Club Balonmano Nava
- (Spain) Ignacio Vallés Becerra (CB) to (Spain) CD Bidasoa

Transfers for the 2022–23 season

Joining

- (Lithuania) Rolandas Bernatonis (LB) from (Hungary) SBS-Eger
- (Argentina) Ramiro Martínez (RW) from (Spain) Balonmano Sinfín
- (Portugal) Ruben Filipe Santos (CB) from (Portugal) Vitória Setubal
- (Serbia) Mladen Šotić (LW) from (Serbia) RK Vojvodina
- (Bosnia and Herzegovina) Dragan Soljic (LP) from (Spain) CB Ademar León
- (Spain) Samuel Ibáñez (GK) from (Spain) BM Ciudad Encantada

Leaving

- (Spain) Álvaro Ruiz Sánchez (CB) (retires)
- (Spain) Nacho Vallés (CB) to (Poland) KS Azoty-Puławy
- (Argentina) James Parker (LB) to (Egypt) Zamalek SC Handball
- (Argentina) Joaquín Barceló (RW) to (Spain) BM Villa de Aranda
- (Brazil) Roney Franzini (GK) to (Spain) BM Cisne
- (Brazil) Pedro Martínez (LP) to (Spain) BM Atlético Valladolid
- (Spain) José Oliver (LP)

== Previous Squads ==
2019–2020 Team
Shirt No	Nationality	Player	Birth Date	Position
1	Spain	Roberto Rodríguez Lario	19 July 2000 (age 26)	Goalkeeper
2	Spain	Álvaro Cabanas	22 April 1990 (age 36)	Right Winger
3	Spain	Gonzalo Vicente Porras	18 June 1992 (age 34)	Line Player
4	Argentina	Pablo Simonet	4 May 1992 (age 34)	Left Back
5	Cuba	Ángel Noris	24 February 1992 (age 34)	Right Back
6	Spain	Borja Méndez	2 September 1996 (age 30)	Central Back
8	Spain	José Oliver Hernandez	2 February 1996 (age 30)	Line Player
9	Argentina	James Parker	9 June 1994 (age 32)	Left Back
11	France	Jules Lignieres	15 August 1998 (age 28)	Central Back
14	Spain	Mario Dorado Pérez	21 November 1998 (age 27)	Left Winger
15	Spain	Carlos Grau	27 November 1986 (age 39)	Left Back
20	Spain	Adrián Nolasco	24 May 1993 (age 33)	Left Back
21	Spain	Diego Rueda	1 January 1999 (age 27)	Right Winger
27	Spain	Luisma Lorasque	2 August 1985 (age 41)	Line Player
29	Spain	Alejandro Cutanda	1 January 1990 (age 36)	Left Back
62	Brazil	Leonardo Terçariol	14 April 1987 (age 39)	Goalkeeper
69	Cuba	Jorge Pabán	29 September 1981 (age 45)	Right Back
77	Spain	Josep Folqués	8 April 1996 (age 30)	Left Winger

== EHF ranking ==
As of 12/10/2022

Rank	Team	Points
76	(Switzerland) Pfadi Winterthur	70
77	(Czech Republic) Talent Plzeň	70
78	(Estonia) Põlva Serviti	69
79	(Spain) TM Benidorm	68
80	(North Macedonia) RK Metalurg Skopje	68
81	(Sweden) HK Malmö	67
82	(Kosovo) KH Besa Famgas	65

== Former club members ==
=== Notable former players ===
- (Spain) Álvaro Cabanas (2018-2020)
- (Spain) David Cuartero Sánchez (2014–2018)
- (Spain) Josep Folqués (2015–2016, 2019–2021)
- (Spain) Rubén Marchán (2015-2019)
- (Spain) Álvaro Ruiz Sánchez (2021–2022)
- (Argentina) Ramiro Martínez (2022-)
- (Argentina) James Parker (2019-2022)
- (Argentina) Pablo Simonet (2016-2020)
- (Argentina) Pablo Vainstein (2021-)
- (Brazil) Leonardo Terçariol (2018-2021)
- (Chile) Emil Feuchtmann (2020-2021)
- (Chile) Esteban Salinas (2015-2018)
- (Cuba) Guillermo Corzo (2016–2018)
- (Cuba) Jorge Pabán (2017–2020)
- (Italy) Gianluca Dapiran (2018-2019)
- (Lithuania) Rolandas Bernatonis (2022-)
- (Montenegro) Mile Mijušković (2016-2019)
- (Romania) Darius Makaria (2017-2018)
- (Russia) Mikhail Revin (2018–2019)
- (Serbia) Ivan Nikčević (2020-)
