= BM Atlético Valladolid =

Spanish handball club

- Full name: Club Deportivo Balonmano Atlético Valladolid
- Nickname(s): Azules, Gladiadores Azules, Pucela, Atléticos
- Founded: 2014; 12 years ago
- Arena: Polideportivo Huerta del Rey
- Capacity: 3,502
- President: Mario Arranz Pastor
- Head coach: David Pisonero
- League: Liga ASOBAL
- 2024-25: 7th
Home	Away

BM Atlético Valladolid is a team of handball based in Valladolid, Spain. It plays in Liga ASOBAL.

Location of Atlético Valladolid

== History ==
Atlético Valladolid was founded on June 4, 2014. On June 30, 2014, there was a vacancy in the second division after Pozoblanco Handball Club withdrew. Atlético Valladolid could start in their place in the second division. In the first season of its history (2014-2015), the Valladolid club was coached by Nacho González, but it lost to the Balonmano Sinfín team in the finals of the playoffs, so it did not reach the Liga ASOBAL. Sponsored by Recoletas, Atlético Valladolid ended its second season (2015-2016) by winning the league title and promotion to Liga ASOBAL. A historic success that allowed a team born at only two years of age to compete in the highest category of national handball for the first time. The club has been playing in Liga ASOBAL ever since.

== Crest, colours, supporters ==
=== Kit manufacturers ===
Period	Kit manufacturer
2014 - 2015	(Italy) Acerbis
2015 - 2017	(Denmark) Hummel
2017 - present	(Spain) Joma

=== Kits ===
HOME
2014-15	2016–17	2017-18	2018-19	2020-21	2022-23

AWAY
2014-15	2015–16	2016–17	2018-19	2022-23

== Sports Hall information ==
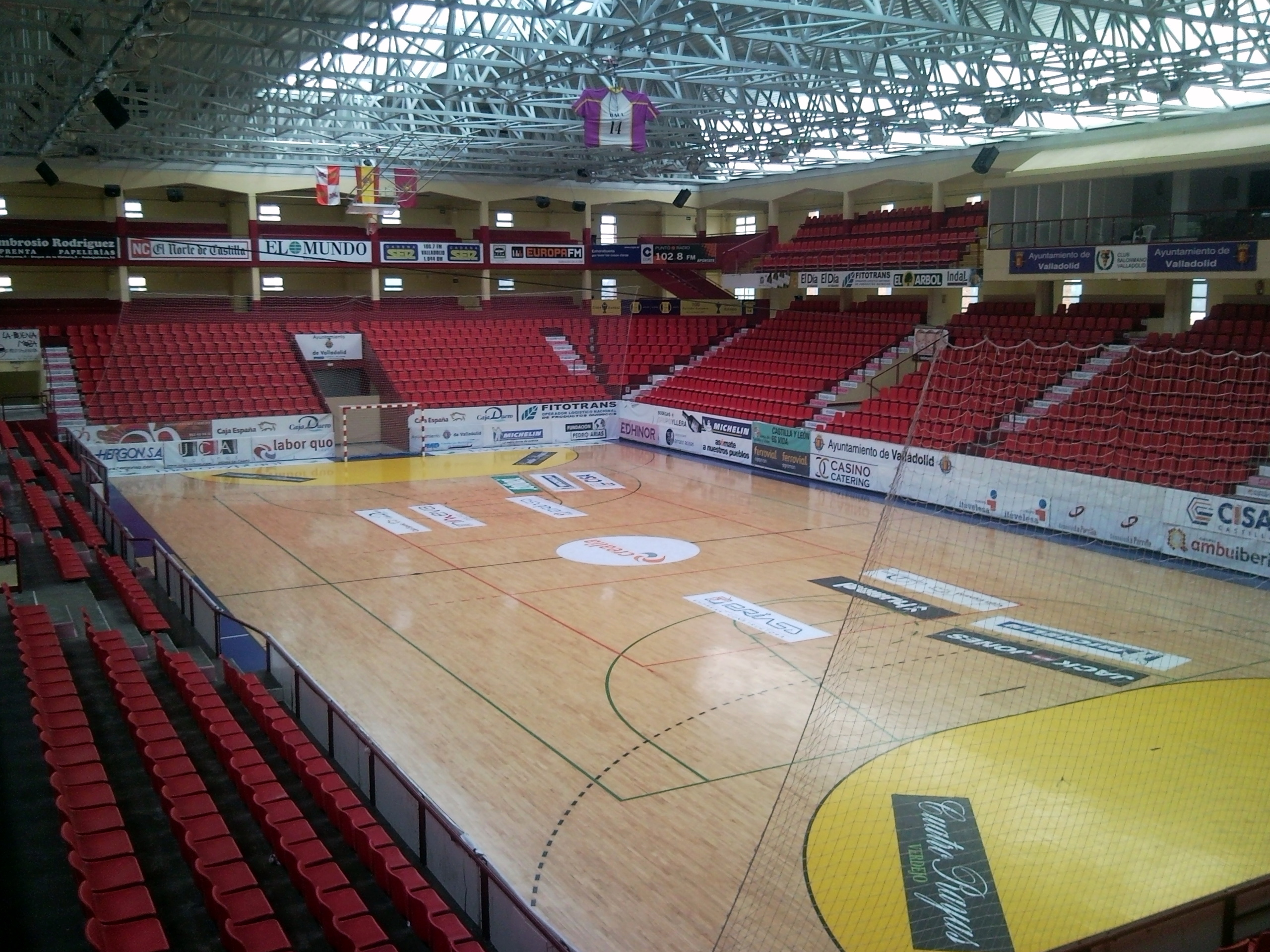
Home hall: Polideportivo Huerta del Rey

- Name: – Polideportivo Huerta del Rey
- City: – Valladolid
- Capacity: – 3502
- Address: – C. de Joaquín Velasco Martín, 9, 47014, Valladolid, Spain

== Team ==
=== Current squad ===
Squad for the 2022–23 season

Atlético Valladolid

Goalkeepers

- 16 (Spain) César Pérez Verdejo
- 29 (Spain) Yeray Lamariano
- 32 (Spain) Nicolás García González

Left Wingers

- 21 (North Macedonia) Dimitar Dimitrioski
- 28 (Spain) Miguel Camino

Right Wingers

- 23 (Italy) Nicolo D'Antino
- 43 (Spain) Manuel García Pascual
- 99 (Spain) Rodrigo Falcucci García

Line Players

- 18 (Spain) Álvaro Martínez Lobato
- 20 (Brazil) Pedro Martínez
- 22 (Spain) Robert Rosell
- 24 (Spain) Daniel Virulegio

Central Backs

- 10 (North Macedonia) Martin Karapalevski
- 6 (Spain) Borja Méndez
- 8 (Brazil) Tarsicio Freitas Oliveira
- 11 (Spain) Alejandro Pisonero
- 39 (Spain) Gonzalo Diez Cortejoso

Left Backs

- 33 (Spain) Pablo Herrero
- 41 (Brazil) Henrique Petter
- 88 (North Macedonia) Darko Dimitrievski

Right Backs

- 19 (Spain) Miguel Martínez Lobato
- 73 (Brazil) José Toledo

=== Technical staff ===
- Head coach: (Spain) David Pisonero
- Assistant coach: (Spain) Óscar Ollero
- Fitness coach: (Spain) Pablo Arranz
- Physiotherapist: (Spain) Javier González
- Club Doctor: (Spain) Pablo Grande

=== Transfers ===
Transfers for the 2026–27 season

Joining

- (Hungary) Benedek Nagy (GK) from (Hungary) ONE Veszprém
- (Spain) Sergio Sánchez Vidán (LW) from (Spain) CB Ademar León
- (Spain) Ignacio Suárez Uribe-Echeverria (CB) from (Spain) BM Huesca
- (Spain) Alejandro Colón (CB) from (Spain) CB Alcobendas
- (Spain) Asier Iribar (LB) on loan from (Spain) CD Bidasoa

Leaving

- (Argentina) Juan Bar (GK) to (Spain) CB Caserío Ciudad Real
- (North Macedonia) Martin Karapalevski (CB) to (North Macedonia) GRK Ohrid
- (Portugal) Gustavo Oliveira (LB) loan back to (Portugal) S.L. Benfica

=== Transfer History ===
Transfers for the 2025–26 season

Joining

- (Romania) Rares-Marian Fodorean (LB) from (Spain) CB Cangas
- (Brazil) Guilherme Carvalho Cabral (LP) from (Portugal) S.L. Benfica
- (Spain) Jorge Serrano (RW) from (Germany) TVB Stuttgart
- (France) Tao Gey-Emparán (RW) on loan from (Spain) CD Bidasoa

Leaving

- (Italy) Nicolo D'Antino (RW) to (Spain) CB Cangas
- (North Macedonia) Dimitar Dimitrioski (LW) to (North Macedonia) RK Prilep 2010
- (Spain) Álvaro Martínez (LP) to (Spain) CB Ciudad de Logroño
- (Spain) Eduardo Calle Redondo (LB) to (France) Saran Loiret Handball

Transfers for the 2022–23 season

Joining

- (North Macedonia) Dimitar Dimitrioski (LW) from (North Macedonia) RK Eurofarm Pelister 2
- (Brazil) José Toledo (RB) from (Romania) CS Minaur Baia Mare
- (Brazil) Pedro Martínez (LP) from (Spain) BM Benidorm
- (Brazil) Henrique Petter (LB) from (Spain) SD Atlético Novás
- (Spain) Daniel Virulegio (LP) from (Spain) BM Cisne
- (Italy) Nicolo D'Antino (RW) on loan from (Spain) CB Nava

Leaving

- (Argentina) Guillermo Fischer (LB) to (Spain) Balonmano Base Oviedo
- (Argentina) Mauricio Basualdo (RB) to (France) JS Cherbourg
- (Spain) Jorge Serrano (RW) to (Germany) TVB 1898 Stuttgart
- (Spain) Daniel Ramos Crespo (LP) to (Spain) BM Torrelavega
- (Spain) Daniel Pérez Bravo (LW) to (Spain) CB Nava
- (Spain) Sergio Casares (RW) to (Spain) CB Nava
- (Spain) Diego Pérez Méndez (LW) to (Spain) BM Ciudad de Málaga
- (Spain) Álvaro Pérez (GK) to (Spain) BM Ciudad de Málaga
- (Spain) Diego Camino (CB) (retires)
- (Brazil) Arthur Patrianova (LB) (retires)
- (Croatia) Paolo Roki (LB)

== Previous Squads ==
2018–2019 Team
Shirt No	Nationality	Player	Birth Date	Position
3	Spain	Diego Camino	22 February 1979 (age 47)	Central Back
4	Spain	Nicolás López Díez	19 March 1994 (age 32)	Line Player
5	Spain	Héctor González Díaz	26 February 1994 (age 32)	Central Back
7	Spain	Roberto Turrado	7 September 1987 (age 39)	Central Back
8	Spain	Daniel Pérez Bravo	20 December 1992 (age 33)	Left Winger
9	Spain	Adrián Fernández	15 June 1994 (age 32)	Central Back
10	Spain	Fernando Hernández	24 February 1973 (age 53)	Right Winger
11	Spain	Rubén Río	2 January 1997 (age 29)	Right Back
12	Spain	Carlos Calle Lobo	22 December 1994 (age 31)	Goalkeeper
16	Spain	César Pérez Verdejo	26 January 1993 (age 33)	Goalkeeper
17	Spain	Abel Serdio	16 April 1994 (age 32)	Line Player
18	Spain	Álvaro Martínez Lobato	31 December 1999 (age 26)	Line Player
19	Spain	Miguel Martínez Lobato	31 December 1999 (age 26)	Right Back
21	Spain	Roberto Pérez Mínguez	15 February 1984 (age 42)	Right Back
22	Argentina	Gastón Mouriño	12 October 1994 (age 32)	Line Player
24	Spain	Jorge Serrano	30 June 1997 (age 29)	Right Winger
28	Spain	Miguel Camino	14 September 1993 (age 33)	Left Winger
43	Spain	Manuel García Pascual	16 April 1997 (age 29)	Right Winger
93	Spain	Víctor Rodríguez Costas	15 March 1993 (age 33)	Left Back
99	Spain	Mario Lanchares	1 January 1999 (age 27)	Goalkeeper

== Former club members ==
=== Notable former players ===
- (Spain) David Fernández Alonso (2015–2016)
- (Spain) Fernando Hernández (2014–2019)
- (Spain) José Delgado (2014-2016)
- (Spain) Daniel Dujshebaev (2016–2017)
- (Spain) Yeray Lamariano (2021-)
- (Spain) Abel Serdio (2016-2019)
- (Spain) Jorge Serrano (2016-2022)
- (Argentina) Guillermo Fischer (2021-2022)
- (Argentina) Gastón Mouriño (2018)
- (Brazil) Arthur Patrianova (2019-2022)
- (Brazil) José Toledo (2022-)
- (Italy) Nicolo D'Antino (2022-)
- (North Macedonia) Darko Dimitrievski (2022-)
- (North Macedonia) Dimitar Dimitrioski (2022-)

=== Former coaches ===
Seasons	Coach	Country
2014–2017	Nacho González Diez	(Spain)
2017–	David Pisonero	(Spain)
