= Liga ASOBAL 2011–12 =

Liga ASOBAL
- Season: 2011–12
- Champions: FC Barcelona Intersport
- Relegated: Maygar Antequera & Alser Puerto Sagunto
- EHF Champions League: FC Barcelona Intersport, Atlético Madrid & Reale Ademar Léon
- EHF Cup: Cuatro Rayas Valladolid & Caja3 Aragón
- Matches: 240
- Goals: 13,534 (56.39 per match)
- Top goalscorer: Jorge Luis Paván, 182
- Biggest home win: FC Barcelona Intersport 44–22 Antequera
- Biggest away win: Quabit Guadalajara 23–39 Atlético Madrid
- Highest scoring: Naturhouse La Rioja 38–34 Huesca

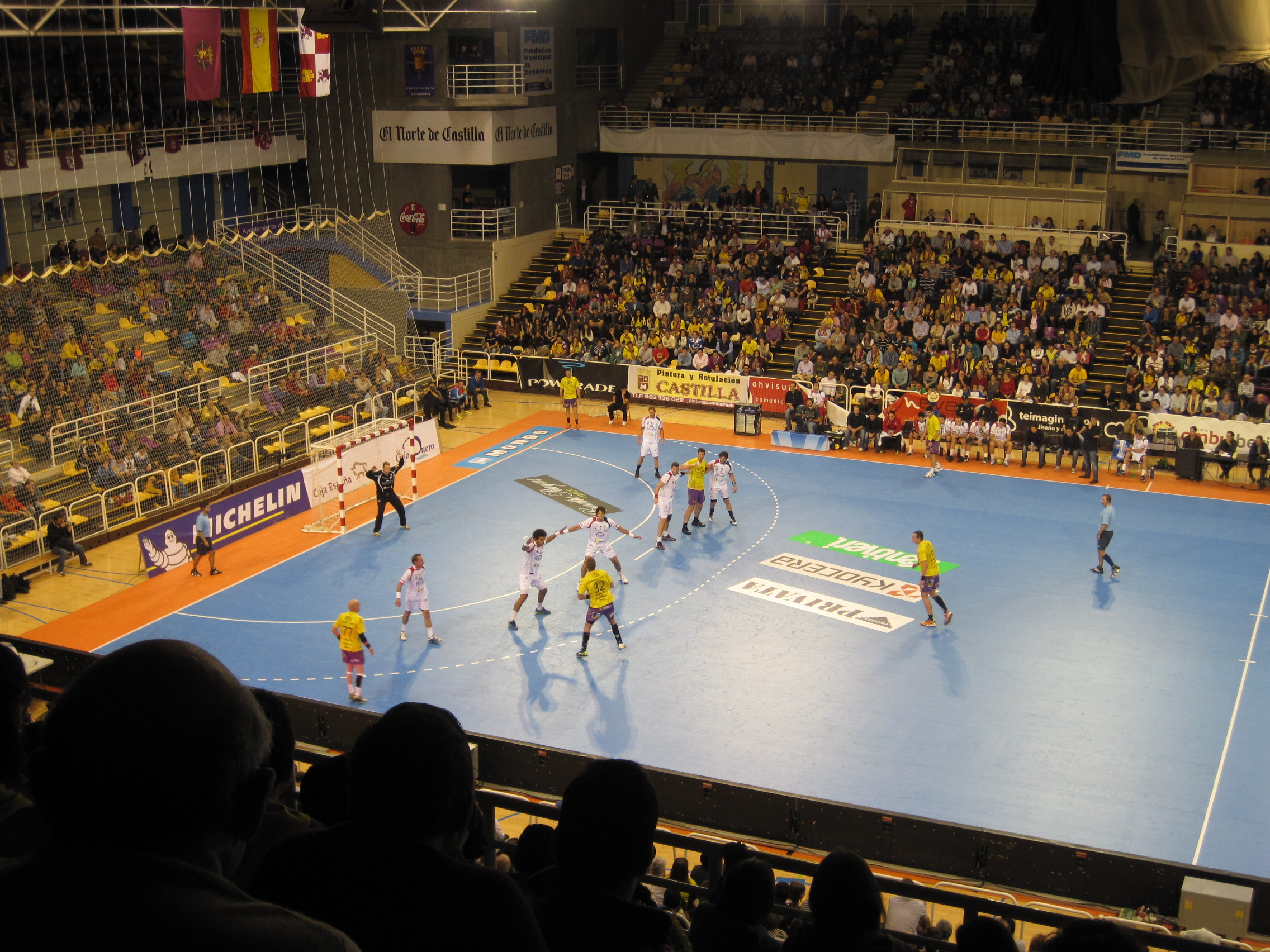
Momento del partido Balonmano Valladolid-Ademar León, correspondiente a la temporada 2011/12 de la liga Asobal.

The Liga ASOBAL 2011–12 was the 22nd season since its establishment. Barcelona Intersport are the defending champions. The campaign began on Friday, 9 September 2011. The last matchday was played on Saturday, 2 June 2012. A total of 16 teams contested the league, 14 of which had already contested in the 2010–11 season, and two of which were promoted from the División de Plata 2010–11.

Barcelona Borges won their eleventh ASOBAL title.

== Promotion and relegation ==
Teams promoted from 2010–11 División de Plata

- Academia Octavio
- Obearagón Huesca
- Helvetia Anaitasuna

Teams relegated to 2011–12 División de Plata

- Alcobendas
- Toledo

Teams dissolved

- JD Arrate

== Teams ==
Location of teams in the 2011–12 Liga ASOBAL

Team	Location	Arena	Capacity
Atlético Madrid	Madrid	Vistalegre	15,000
Antequera	Antequera	Fernando Argüelles	2,575
Anaitasuna	Pamplona	Anaitasuna	3,000
Aragón	Zaragoza	Príncipe Felipe	12,000
Barcelona	Barcelona	Palau Blaugrana	8,250
Ciudad Encantada	Cuenca	El Sargal	1,900
Granollers	Granollers	Palau D'Esports	6,500
Huesca	Huesca	Palacio de Deportes	5,000
Puerto Sagunto	Sagunto	Pabellón Municipal	1,500
Naturhouse La Rioja	Logroño	Palacio de los Deportes	3,851
Quabit Guadalajara	Guadalajara	Multiusos de Guadalajara	5,894
Valladolid	Valladolid	Huerta del Rey	3,500
San Antonio	Pamplona	Pabellón Universitario	3,000
Ademar León	León, Spain	Palacio Municipal	6,000
Academia Octavio	Vigo	As Travesas	5,000
Torrevieja	Torrevieja	Palacio de los Deportes	4,500

== League table ==
	Team	Pld	W	D	L	GF	GA	Diff	Pts
1	Barcelona	30	29	0	1	1012	752	260	58
2	Atlético Madrid	30	28	1	1	1047	771	276	57
3	Ademar León	30	20	4	6	906	796	110	44
4	Valladolid	30	20	3	7	855	779	76	43
5	Aragón	30	16	0	14	882	861	21	32
6	Ciudad Encantada	30	15	1	14	808	874	−66	31
7	Naturhouse La Rioja	30	12	4	13	820	837	−17	28
8	Fraikin Granollers	30	10	6	14	785	802	−17	26
9	Torrevieja	30	12	1	16	819	842	−23	25
10	AMAYA Sport S.A.	30	10	4	16	864	888	−24	24
11	Huesca	30	9	4	17	827	914	−87	22
12	Helvetia Anaitasuna	30	8	6	16	781	881	−100	22
13	Academia Octavio	30	7	6	17	800	893	−93	20
14	Quabit Guadalajara	30	7	4	19	787	871	−84	18
15	Maygar Antequera	30	7	3	20	783	892	−109	17
16	Alser Puerto Sagunto	30	3	5	22	758	881	−123	11

EHF Champions League
EHF Cup
Relegated to División de Plata

- Cuatro Rayas Valladolid declined to play in EHF Cup due to financial reasons.
- San Antonio gave up to play in Liga ASOBAL due to financial reasons.
- Torrevieja gave up to play in Liga ASOBAL due to financial reasons.
- Alser Puerto Sagunto, although was finished in 16th position on standings and was relegated, their status as Liga ASOBAL team was re-established due to vacant seats.

2011–12 Liga ASOBAL winners
(Catalonia)
Barcelona Borges
Eleventh title

== Statistics ==
=== Top goalscorers ===
- Full goalscorers list

Rank	Name	Team	Goals	GP	GPG
1	(Cuba) Jorge Paván	Ciudad Encantada	182	29	6.28
2	(North Macedonia) Kiril Lazarov	Atlético Madrid	155	29	5.34
3	(Spain) Ángel Pérez	Ciudad Encantada	148	29	5.10
4	(Slovakia) Martin Straňovský	Reale Ademar León	144	28	5.14
5	(Belarus) Siarhei Rutenka	FC Barcelona Intersport	136	27	5.04

=== Top goalkeepers ===
- Full goalkeepers list

Rank	Name	Team	Saves	Shots	%
1	(Spain) José Manuel Sierra	Cuatro Rayas Valladolid	392	1016	38.58%
2	(Sweden) Richard Kappelin	Ciudad Encantada	331	977	33.88%
3	(Serbia) Dimitrije Pejanović	Torrevieja	312	894	34.90%
4	(Spain) Javier Díaz	Academia Octavio	302	1052	28.71%
5	(Spain) Gonzalo Pérez	Fraikin Granollers	297	917	32.39%

== See also ==
- División de Plata de Balonmano 2011–12
