= 2014–15 Liga ASOBAL =

Liga ASOBAL
- Season: 2014–15
- Champions: FC Barcelona
- Relegated: MMT Seguros Zamora; Juanfersa Gijón
- EHF Champions League: FC Barcelona; Naturhouse La Rioja
- EHF Cup: Fraikin BM Granollers; Helvetia Anaitasuna; Frigoríficos del Morrazo
- Matches played: 240
- Goals scored: 13,634 (56.81 per match)
- Top goalscorer: Juan Antonio Vázquez, 216
- Biggest home win: FC Barcelona 43–22 Frigoríficos del Morrazo
- Biggest away win: MMT Seguros Zamora 19–45 FC Barcelona
- Highest scoring: Abanca Ademar León 37–43 FC Barcelona

The 2014–15 Liga ASOBAL, also named Liga ASOBAL BAUHAUS by sponsorship reasons, is the 25th season since its establishment. FC Barcelona was the defending champions. The campaign began in September 2014. The last matchday will be played in May 2015. A total of 16 teams contest the league, 14 of which had already contested in the 2013–14 season, and two of which were promoted from the División de Plata 2013–14.

== Promotion and relegation ==
Teams promoted from 2013–14 División de Plata

- MMT Seguros Zamora
- BM Benidorm

Teams relegated to 2014–15 División de Plata

- Cuatro Rayas Valladolid
- Bidasoa Irun

== Teams ==
2014–15 Liga Asobal teams

Team	City	Venue	Capacity
FC Barcelona	Barcelona	Palau Blaugrana	8,250
Naturhouse La Rioja	Logroño	Palacio de los Deportes	3,851
Fraikin Granollers	Granollers	Palau D'Esports	6,500
Bada Huesca	Huesca	Palacio de Deportes	5,000
ABANCA Ademar León	León	Palacio de los Deportes	5,188
Globalcaja C. Encantada	Cuenca	El Sargal	1,900
Helvetia Anaitasuna	Pamplona	Anaitasuna	3,000
BM Guadalajara	Guadalajara	Multiusos de Guadalajara	5,894
BM Aragón	Zaragoza	Príncipe Felipe	10,744
Frigoríficos del Morrazo	Cangas do Morrazo	O Gatañal	3,000
Ángel Ximénez P. Genil	Puente Genil	Alcalde Miguel Salas	600
Juanfersa Grupo Fegar	Gijón	Palacio de Deportes	5,197
Fertiberia Puerto Sagunto	Puerto de Sagunto	Pabellón Municipal	1,500
Villa de Aranda	Aranda de Duero	Príncipe de Asturias	3,000
MMT Seguros Zamora	Zamora	Ángel Nieto	2,100
Benidorm	Benidorm	Palau d'Esports L'Illa	2,500

== League table ==
Pos	Team	Pld	W	D	L	GF	GA	GD	Pts	Qualification or relegation
1	FC Barcelona	30	30	0	0	1187	783	+404	60	Qualification to the EHF Champions League
2	Naturhouse La Rioja	30	23	2	5	944	811	+133	48	Qualification to the EHF Champions League
3	Fraikin BM Granollers	30	20	3	7	840	787	+53	43	Qualification to the EHF Cup
4	Helvetia Anaitasuna	30	16	4	10	869	834	+35	36	Qualification to the EHF Cup
5	Frigoríficos del Morrazo	30	15	2	13	823	848	−25	32	Qualification to the EHF Cup
6	BM Benidorm	30	14	4	12	787	800	−13	32	
7	Abanca Ademar León	30	13	5	12	915	908	+7	31	
8	Blas-Gon Villa de Aranda	30	11	6	13	861	863	−2	28	
9	Bada Huesca	30	13	1	16	807	869	−62	27	
10	Fertiberia Puerto Sagunto	30	12	0	18	881	954	−73	24	
11	BM Guadalajara	30	11	2	17	820	865	−45	24	
12	Ángel Ximénez Puente Genil	30	11	2	17	809	831	−22	24	
13	BM Aragón	30	10	3	17	841	912	−71	23	
14	Globalcaja Ciudad Encantada	30	9	3	18	777	850	−73	21	
15	MMT Seguros Zamora	30	8	3	19	762	880	−118	19	Relegation to División de Plata
16	Juanfersa Gijón	30	4	0	26	710	838	−128	8	Relegation to División de Plata

Updated to match(es) played on 15 May 2015. Source: ASOBAL

2014–15 Liga ASOBAL winners
(Spain)
FC Barcelona
Fourteenth title

== Top goalscorers ==
#	Player	Goals	Team
1	(Spain) Juan Antonio Vázquez	216	Ángel Ximénez Puente Genil
2	(Spain) José Mario Carrillo	179	Abanca Ademar León
3	(Lithuania) Aidenas Malašinskas	177	Fertiberia Puerto Sagunto
4	(Spain) Octavio Magadán	173	MMT Seguros Zamora
4	(Spain) David Cuartero	173	BM Benidorm

== See also ==
- División de Plata de Balonmano 2014–15
