= Danijel Šarić =

Bosnian-Qatari handball player (born 1977)

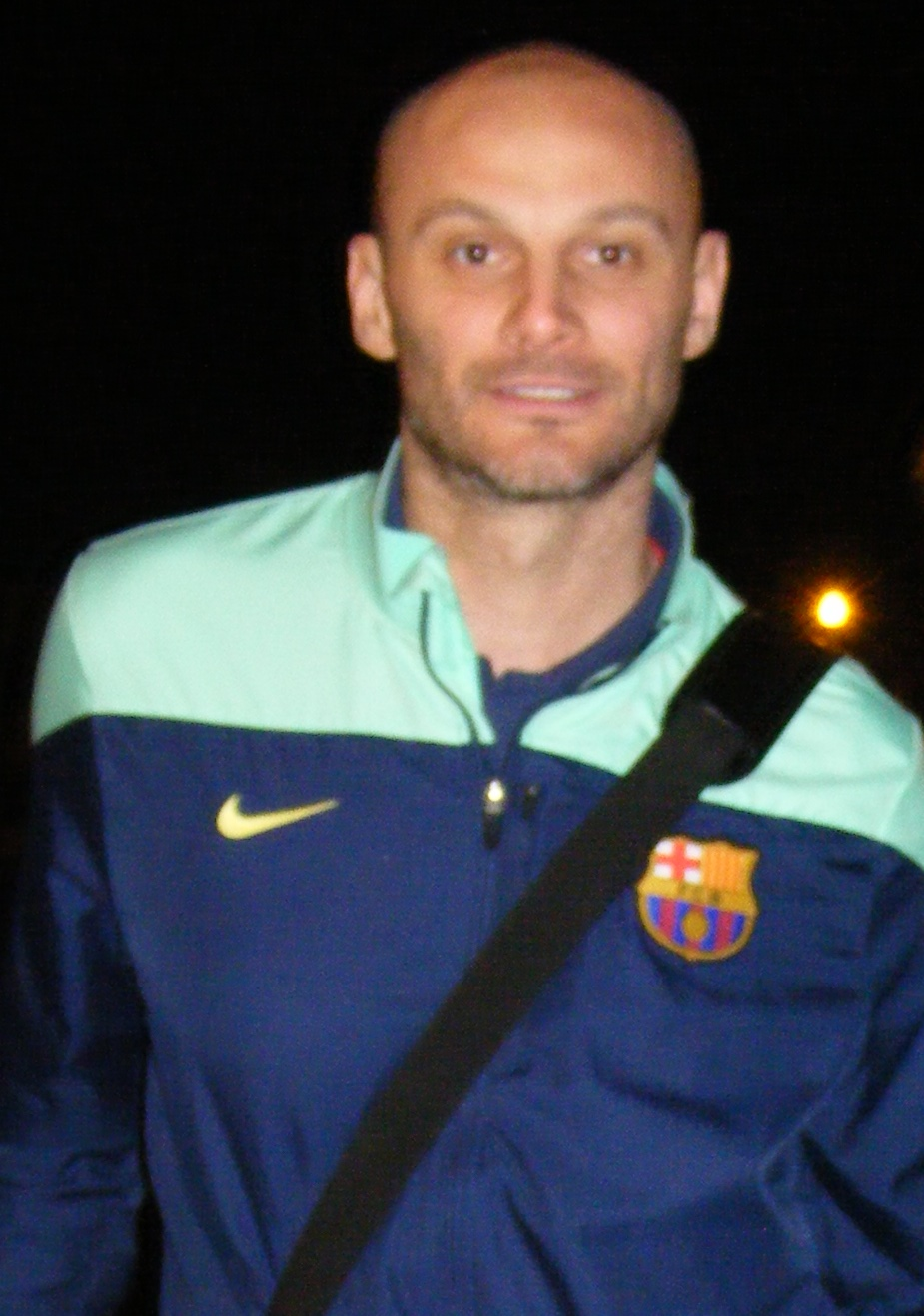
- Šarić in 2014

Personal information
- Full name: Danijel Šarić
- Nationality: Bosnian / Qatari
- Born: 27 June 1977 (age 49) Doboj, SR Bosnia and Herzegovina, SFR Yugoslavia
- Height: 1.94 m (6 ft 4 in)

Sport
- Sport: Handball
- Position: Goalkeeper
- Current club: Al Arabi

Youth career
- Years: Team
- –: Sloga Doboj
- –: Borac Banja Luka

Senior clubs
- Years: Team
- 1996–1999: Crvena zvezda
- 1999–2003: Sintelon
- 2003–2006: Ciudad Real
- 2003–2004: → Cantabria (loan)
- 2004–2006: → Alcobendas (loan)
- 2006–2008: Ademar León
- 2008–2009: Portland San Antonio
- 2009–2016: Barcelona
- 2016–2017: Al Qiyadah
- 2017: Al Sadd
- 2017–2019: Al Duhail
- 2019–: Al Arabi
National team
Years	Team	Apps	(Gls)
2000–2006	Serbia and Montenegro	50	(0)
2010–2011	Bosnia and Herzegovina	7	(0)
2015–2022	Qatar	69	(0)
Medal record
Men's handball
Representing Qatar
World Championship
Silver medal – second place	2015 Qatar	Team
Asian Championship
Gold medal – first place	2016 Bahrain	Team
Gold medal – first place	2018 South Korea	Team
Gold medal – first place	2020 Kuwait	Team
Asian Games
Gold medal – first place	2018 Jakarta–Palembang	Team

Danijel Šarić (Serbian Cyrillic: Данијел Шарић; born 27 June 1977) is a Bosnian-Qatari handball player of Serbian descent who plays for Qatari club Al Arabi.

== Club career ==
After starting out at his hometown club Sloga Doboj and later playing for Borac Banja Luka, Šarić moved to FR Yugoslavia and joined Crvena zvezda. He spent three seasons at the club and won two consecutive national championships (1997 and 1998). In 1999, Šarić switched to ambitious Sintelon, alongside his teammate Ratko Nikolić.

In 2003, Šarić moved to Spain and signed with Ciudad Real, but never played for the team. He instead spent the entire duration of his contract on loan with Cantabria and Alcobendas. In 2006, Šarić was acquired by Ademar León. He also played for Portland San Antonio. In 2009, Šarić agreed terms with Barcelona. He spent seven seasons at the club and won numerous trophies, including two EHF Champions League titles (2011 and 2015).

== International career ==
=== Serbia and Montenegro ===
In the late 1990s, Šarić chose to represent FR Yugoslavia (later known as Serbia and Montenegro) in international competitions, just like his fellow Bosnian Serbs, Mladen Bojinović and Nebojša Golić. He was later named in the preliminary squad for the 2000 Summer Olympics, but was omitted from the final selection. Later on, Šarić participated at the 2005 World Championship and 2006 European Championship. He announced his retirement from the national team in February 2006.

=== Bosnia and Herzegovina ===
In October 2009, it was reported that Šarić accepted a call-up to represent his native Bosnia and Herzegovina. He was cleared to play for the team in the Euro 2012 qualifiers, making his debut in a 27–19 away loss at Hungary on 28 October 2010. His last cap came on 12 March 2011 in a 23–21 home loss to Estonia.

=== Qatar ===
In October 2014, it was announced that Šarić would be representing Qatar at the 2015 World Championship. He helped the team finish as the tournament's runners-up. This was the first World Championship medal for both Qatar and for any Asian team. The result was however controversial due to the many naturalized players of Qatar, of which Šarić was one of them. According to the Frankfurter Allgemeine, only four of the 17 players in the squad were native to Qatar. The practice was criticised by Austrian goalkeeper after his team's loss to Qatar in the round of 16, saying "It [felt] like playing against a world selection team" and "I think it is not the sense of a world championship." Furthermore, there were claims of favourable refereering for the hosts. After the final whistle of their semifinal against Poland, the Polish players showed their discontent by ironically applauding the three referees.

The following year, Šarić participated at the 2016 Summer Olympics. He also won three gold medals at three successive Asian Championships (2016, 2018 and 2020).

== Honours ==
Club

Crvena zvezda

- Handball Championship of FR Yugoslavia: 1996–97, 1997–98

Sintelon

- Handball Cup of FR Yugoslavia: 1999–2000

Barcelona

- Liga ASOBAL: 2010–11, 2011–12, 2012–13, 2013–14, 2014–15, 2015–16
- Copa ASOBAL: 2009–10, 2011–12, 2012–13, 2013–14, 2014–15, 2015–16
- Supercopa ASOBAL: 2008–09, 2011–12, 2012–13, 2013–14
- Copa del Rey de Balonmano: 2009–10, 2013–14
- EHF Champions League: 2010–11, 2014–15
- IHF Men's Super Globe: 2013, 2014

Al Duhail

- Qatar Handball League: 2017–18

Al Arabi

- Qatar Handball League: 2019–20

International

Qatar

- Asian Men's Handball Championship: 2016, 2018, 2020
- Asian Games: 2018
- World Men's Handball Championship runner-up: 2015

Individual

- Liga ASOBAL MVP: 2010–11, 2013–14
- Liga ASOBAL Best Goalkeeper: 2010–11, 2011–12, 2012–13 and 2013–14
- Copa ASOBAL Best Goalkeeper: 2010–11, 2011–12, 2014–15
- Supercopa ASOBAL Best Goalkeeper: 2008–09, 2009–10, 2011–12, 2012–13
- Highest percentage of saves in Liga ASOBAL: 2015–16
