= Liga ASOBAL 2010–11 =

Liga ASOBAL
- Season: 2010–11
- Champions: FC Barcelona Borges
- Relegated: Toledo & Alcobendas
- EHF Champions League: Barcelona Borges, Renovalia Ciudad Real & Reale Ademar
- EHF Cup: Fraikin Granollers, Cuatro Rayas Valladolid & CAI BM Aragón
- Matches: 240
- Goals: 13,620 (56.75 per match)
- Top goalscorer: Rafael Baena (Antequera) – 179 goals
- Biggest home win: Cuatro Rayas Toledo 44–21 Toledo
- Biggest away win: Alcobendas 26–40 Naturhouse La Rioja
- Highest scoring: Reale Ademar 34–41 Ciudad Real

Liga ASOBAL 2010–11 season was the 21st since its establishment. Ciudad Real were the defending champions, having won their 5th La Liga title in the previous season. The campaign began on Saturday, 11 September 2010. The league was originally scheduled to end on 21 May 2011. A total of 16 teams contested the league, 14 of which had already been contested in the 2009–10 season, and two of which were promoted from the División de Plata.

Barcelona Borges won their tenth ASOBAL title.

== Promotion and relegation ==
Teams promoted from 2009–10 División de Honor B de Balonmano

- Alser Puerto Sagunto
- Quabit Guadalajara

Teams relegated to 2010–11 División de Honor B de Balonmano

- Octavio Pilotes Posada
- CB Cangas (Frigoríficos del Morrazo)

== Team information ==
2010–11 Liga Asobal teams

Team	Venue	Capacity
Alcobendas	Severo Ochoa	3,000
Antequera	Fernando Argüelles	2,575
Arrate	Polideportivo Ipurua	3,500
CAI BM Aragón	Príncipe Felipe	12,000
Barcelona Borges	Palau Blaugrana	8,250
Renovalia Ciudad Real	Quijote Arena	5,107
Cuenca 2016	El Sargal	1,900
Fraikin Granollers	Palau D'Esports	6,500
Alser Puerto Sagunto	Pabellón Municipal	1,500
Toledo	Javier Lozano Cid	2,500
Naturhouse La Rioja	Palacio de los Deportes	3,851
Quabit Guadalajara	Multiusos de Guadalajara	5,894
Cuatro Rayas Valladolid	Huerta del Rey	3,500
AMAYA Sport S.A.	Pabellón Universitario	3,000
Reale Ademar León	Palacio Municipal	6,000
Torrevieja	Palacio de los Deportes	4,500

== League table ==
- Final standings

	Team	P	W	D	L	G+	G−	Dif	Pts
1	Barcelona Borges	30	29	0	1	1003	747	256	58
2	Renovalia Ciudad Real	30	27	0	3	986	777	209	54
3	Reale Ademar	30	20	4	6	937	853	84	43
4	Fraikin Granollers	30	20	1	9	911	796	115	43
5	Cuatro Rayas Valladolid	30	20	1	9	878	795	83	41
6	CAI BM Aragón	30	18	4	8	902	853	49	40
7	AMAYA Sport S.A.	30	15	2	13	840	816	24	32
8	Cuenca 2016	30	13	2	15	814	836	–22	28
9	Naturhouse La Rioja	30	13	0	17	820	840	–20	26
10	Antequera	30	12	2	16	796	839	–43	24
11	Torrevieja	30	10	2	18	734	823	–89	22
12	Alser Puerto Sagunto	30	8	4	18	811	883	–72	21
13	Quabit Guadalajara	30	6	6	18	832	919	–87	18
14	Arrate	30	5	4	21	740	877	–137	14
15	Toledo	30	4	3	23	799	945	–146	11
16	Alcobendas	30	1	3	26	730	930	–200	5

EHF Champions League
EHF Cup
EHF Cup Winners' Cup
Relegated to División de Honor B

2010–11 Liga ASOBAL winners
(Catalonia)
Barcelona Borges
Tenth title

== Top goal scorers ==
Player	Goals	Team
(Spain) Rafael Baena	179	Antequera
(Slovakia) Martin Straňovský	161	Reale Ademar León
(Cuba) Jorge Paván	161	Cuenca 2016
(Montenegro) Nikola Prce	157	Alser Puerto Sagunto
(Spain) Rafael da Costa	154	Cuenca 2016
(Montenegro) Novica Rudović	153	Quabit Guadalajara
(Spain) Juanín García	152	Barcelona Borges
(Norway) Håvard Tvedten	148	Cuatro Rayas Valladolid
(Spain) David Cuartero	148	Torrevieja
(Spain) Antonio García	146	Fraikin Granollers

== See also ==
- División de Plata de Balonmano 2010–11
