= 2016–17 Liga ASOBAL =

Liga ASOBAL
- Season: 2016–17
- Champions: FC Barcelona
- Relegated: DS Auto Gomas Sinfín, BM Villa de Aranda
- EHF Champions League: Ademar León
- EHF Cup: Naturhouse La Rioja; BM Granollers; Helvetia Anaitasuna
- Matches played: 240
- Goals scored: 13,126 (54.69 per match)
- Top goalscorer: Chema Márquez (200 goals)

The 2016–17 Liga ASOBAL, also named Liga ASOBAL by sponsorship reasons, is the 27th season since its establishment.

FC Barcelona won the league without losing a single point.

== Promotion and relegation ==
Teams relegated to 2016–17 División de Plata

- ~~BM Aragón~~ (dissolved)
- SD Teucro

Teams promoted from 2015–16 División de Plata

- Bidasoa Irún
- Atlético Valladolid

== Teams ==
2014–15 Liga Asobal teams

Team	City	Venue	Capacity
Abanca Ademar León	León	Palacio de los Deportes	5,188
Ángel Ximénez Avia PG	Puente Genil	Alcalde Miguel Salas	600
Bada Huesca	Huesca	Palacio de Deportes	5,000
Bidasoa Irún	Irún	Polideportivo Artaleku	2,200
BM Benidorm	Benidorm	Palau d'Esports L'Illa	2,500
BM Villa de Aranda	Aranda de Duero	Príncipe de Asturias	3,000
DS Auto Gomas Sinfín	Santander	La Albericia	4,000
FC Barcelona Lassa	Barcelona	Palau Blaugrana	8,250
Fertiberia Puerto Sagunto	Puerto de Sagunto	Pabellón Municipal	1,500
Fraikin Granollers	Granollers	Palau d'Esports	6,500
Frigoríficos del Morrazo	Cangas do Morrazo	O Gatañal	3,000
Helvetia Anaitasuna	Pamplona	Anaitasuna	3,000
Liberbank Ciudad Encantada	Cuenca	El Sargal	1,900
Naturhouse La Rioja	Logroño	Palacio de los Deportes	3,851
Quabit Guadalajara	Guadalajara	Multiusos de Guadalajara	5,894
Recoletas Atlético Valladolid	Valladolid	Polideportivo Huerta del Rey	3,500

== League table ==
Pos	Team	Pld	W	D	L	GF	GA	GD	Pts	Qualification or relegation
1	FC Barcelona Lassa	30	30	0	0	998	740	+258	60	Qualification to the EHF Champions League
2	Abanca Ademar León	30	25	1	4	866	748	+118	51	Qualification to the EHF Champions League
3	Naturhouse La Rioja	30	20	2	8	889	782	+107	42	Qualification to the EHF Cup
4	Fraikin BM Granollers	30	17	3	10	853	816	+37	37	Qualification to the EHF Cup
5	Helvetia Anaitasuna	30	14	4	12	824	810	+14	32	Qualification to the EHF Cup
6	Liberbank Ciudad Encantada	30	13	5	12	807	826	−19	31	
7	Bada Huesca	30	14	2	14	760	796	−36	30	
8	Recoletas Atlético Valladolid	30	14	0	16	840	832	+8	28	
9	Ángel Ximénez Avia Puente Genil	30	10	5	15	812	850	−38	25	
10	Quabit Guadalajara	30	12	0	18	795	862	−67	24	
11	Bidasoa Irún	30	10	3	17	795	837	−42	23	
12	Fertiberia Puerto Sagunto	30	9	5	16	764	805	−41	23	
13	BM Benidorm	30	9	3	18	755	807	−52	21	
14	Frigoríficos del Morrazo	30	9	2	19	798	898	−100	20	
15	BM Villa de Aranda	30	8	4	18	803	859	−56	20	Relegation to División de Plata
16	DS Auto Gomas Sinfín	30	6	1	23	767	858	−91	13	Relegation to División de Plata

Source: ASOBAL
