= Liga ASOBAL 2013–14 =

Liga ASOBAL
- Season: 2013–14
- Champions: FC Barcelona
- Relegated: Bidasoa Irun; Cuatro Rayas Valladolid
- EHF Champions League: FC Barcelona Intersport & Naturhouse La Rioja
- EHF Cup: Fraikin Granollers, BM Huesca & Reale Ademar León
- Matches: 240
- Goals: 13,085 (54.52 per match)
- Top goalscorer: José Mario Carrillo, 179
- Biggest home win: FC Barcelona 48–22 BM Aragón
- Biggest away win: Juanfersa Grupo Fegar 21–45 FC Barcelona
- Highest scoring: Reale Ademar León 36–38 Naturhouse La Rioja

The Liga ASOBAL 2013–14 was the 24th season since its establishment. FC Barcelona was the defending champions. The campaign began on Friday, 13 September 2013. The last matchday was played on Sunday, 25 May 2014. A total of 16 teams contested the league, 13 of which had already contested in the 2012–13 season, and three of which were promoted from the División de Plata 2012–13.

FC Barcelona won their fourth title in a row gathering thirteen ASOBAL titles. FC Barcelona also equaled the record of BM Ciudad Real when in 2009-10 season won every match.

The season was marked by the shutdown of BM Atlético Madrid before the start of season due to financial constraints.

== Promotion and relegation ==
Teams promoted from 2012–13 División de Plata

- Juanfersa Grupo Fegar
- Ángel Ximénez
- Bidasoa Irun

Teams relegated to 2013–14 División de Plata

- ARS Palma del Río

Teams dissolved

- Atlético Madrid

== Teams ==
2013–14 Liga Asobal teams

Team	City	Venue	Capacity
FC Barcelona	Barcelona	Palau Blaugrana	8,250
Naturhouse La Rioja	Logroño	Palacio de los Deportes	3,851
Reale Ademar León	León	Palacio Municipal	6,000
Aragón	Zaragoza	Príncipe Felipe	10,744
Fraikin Granollers	Granollers	Palau D'Esports	6,500
Helvetia Anaitasuna	Pamplona	Anaitasuna	3,000
Huesca	Huesca	Palacio de Deportes	5,000
Fertiberia Puerto Sagunto	Puerto de Sagunto	Pabellón Municipal	1,500
Globalcaja C. Encantada	Cuenca	El Sargal	1,900
Villa de Aranda Top Ribera	Aranda de Duero	Príncipe de Asturias	3,000
Cuatro Rayas Valladolid	Valladolid	Huerta del Rey	3,500
BM Guadalajara	Guadalajara	Multiusos de Guadalajara	5,894
Frigoríficos del Morrazo	Cangas do Morrazo	O Gatañal	3,000
Juanfersa Grupo Fegar	Gijón	Palacio de Deportes	5,197
Ángel Ximénez	Puente Genil	Alcalde Miguel Salas	600
Bidasoa Irun	Irun	Polideportivo Artaleku	2,200

== Standings ==
	Team	Pld	W	D	L	GF	GA	Diff	Pts
1	FC Barcelona	30	30	0	0	1146	709	437	60
2	Naturhouse La Rioja	30	22	3	5	915	803	112	47
3	Fraikin Granollers	30	20	2	8	791	735	56	42
4	Huesca	30	18	4	8	816	804	12	40
5	Reale Ademar León	30	16	4	10	867	843	24	36
6	GlobalCaja C. Encantada	30	11	7	12	761	796	−35	29
7	Helvetia Anaitasuna	30	13	2	15	769	790	−21	28
8	Guadalajara	30	12	3	15	788	797	−9	27
9	Aragón	30	11	3	16	827	878	−51	25
10	Frigoríficos del Morrazo	30	10	5	15	773	806	−33	25
11	Ángel Ximénez	30	9	5	16	771	834	−63	23
12	Juanfersa Grupo Fegar	30	10	3	17	738	810	−72	23
13	Fertiberia Puerto Sagunto	30	10	2	18	816	900	−84	22
14	V. Aranda Top Ribera	30	9	4	17	811	893	−82	22
15	Cuatro Rayas Valladolid	30	8	6	16	779	827	−48	22
16	Bidasoa Irun	30	3	3	24	717	860	−143	9

EHF Champions League
EHF Cup
Relegated to División de Plata

2013–14 Liga ASOBAL winners
(Spain)
Barcelona Borges
Thirteenth title

== Statistics ==
=== Top goalscorers ===
- Full goalscorers list

Rank	Name	Team	Goals	GP	GPG
1	(Spain) José Mario Carrillo	Reale Ademar León	179	30	5.97
2	(France) Léo Renaud-David	GlobalCaja C. Encantada	169	29	5.83
3	(Sweden) Michael Apelgren	Fertiberia Puerto Sagunto	165	29	5.69
4	(Spain) Álvaro Cabanas	V. Aranda Top Ribera	158	30	5.27
5	(Spain) David Cuartero	Huesca	158	30	5.27

=== Top goalkeepers ===
- Full goalkeepers list

Rank	Name	Team	Saves	Shots	%
1	(Argentina) Matías Schulz	Fraikin Granollers	378	1030	36.70%
2	(Spain) Jorge Gómez	Aragón	358	1168	30.65%
3	(Spain) David Bruixola	Fertiberia Puerto Sagunto	349	1125	31.02%
4	(Bosnia and Herzegovina) Adam Savić	Juanfers Grupo Fegar	314	974	32.24%
5	(Spain) Javier Díaz	V. Aranda Top Ribera	313	1075	29.12%

== See also ==
- División de Plata de Balonmano 2013–14
