= Liga ASOBAL 2012–13 =

Liga ASOBAL
- Season: 2012–13
- Champions: FC Barcelona Intersport
- Relegated: ARS Palma del Río
- EHF Champions League: FC Barcelona Intersport, Naturhouse La Rioja
- EHF Cup: Reale Ademar León & BM Aragón
- Matches: 240
- Goals: 13,161 (54.84 per match)
- Top goalscorer: (Spain) Alex Dujshebaev, 198
- Biggest home win: BM Atlético Madrid 34–13 Frigoríficos del Morrazo
- Biggest away win: Helvetia Anaitasuna 19–39 FC Barcelona Intersport
- Highest scoring: BM Aragón 38–36 Cuatro Rayas Valladolid

The Liga ASOBAL 2012–13 was the 23rd season since its establishment. Barcelona Intersport was the defending champions. The campaign began on Friday, 7 September 2012. The last matchday was played on Saturday, 25 May 2013. A total of 16 teams contested the league, 14 of which had already contested in the 2011–12 season, and two of which were promoted from the División de Plata 2011–12.

Barcelona Borges won their third title in a row gathering twelve ASOBAL titles.

The season was marked by the shutdown of BM Atlético Madrid at end of season due to financial constraints.

== Promotion and relegation ==
Teams promoted from 2011–12 División de Plata

- Frigoríficos del Morrazo
- ARS Palma del Río
- Villa de Aranda

Teams relegated to 2012–13 División de Plata

- None (0)

Teams dissolved

- BM Antequera
- CB Torrevieja
- SDC San Antonio

== Teams ==
2012–13 Liga Asobal teams

Team	City	Venue	Capacity
Barcelona Intersport	Barcelona	Palau Blaugrana	8,250
Atlético Madrid	Madrid	Vistalegre	15,000
Reale Ademar León	León	Palacio Municipal	6,000
Cuatro Rayas Valladolid	Valladolid	Huerta del Rey	3,500
Aragón	Zaragoza	Príncipe Felipe	12,000
Globalcaja C. Encantada	Cuenca	El Sargal	1,900
Naturhouse La Rioja	Logroño	Palacio de los Deportes	3,851
Fraikin Granollers	Granollers	Palau D'Esports	6,500
Huesca	Huesca	Palacio de Deportes	5,000
Helvetia Anaitasuna	Pamplona	Anaitasuna	3,000
Academia Octavio	Vigo	As Travesas	5,000
Quabit Guadalajara	Guadalajara	Multiusos de Guadalajara	5,894
Fertiberia Puerto Sagunto	Puerto de Sagunto	Pabellón Municipal	1,500
ARS Palma del Río	Palma del Río	El Pandero	1,500
Frigoríficos del Morrazo	Cangas do Morrazo	O Gatañal	3,000
V. Aranda Autocares Bayo	Aranda de Duero	Príncipe de Asturias	3,000

== League table ==
	Team	Pld	W	D	L	GF	GA	Diff	Pts
1	Barcelona Intersport	30	29	0	1	1019	679	340	58
2	Atlético Madrid	30	24	1	5	916	791	125	49
3	Naturhouse La Rioja	30	20	2	8	880	821	59	42
4	Reale Ademar León	30	18	2	10	834	763	71	38
5	Aragón	30	18	2	10	906	870	36	38
6	Fraikin Granollers	30	15	3	12	820	795	25	33
7	Helvetia Anaitasuna	30	13	4	13	801	810	−9	30
8	Huesca	30	12	4	14	822	824	−2	28
9	Fertiberia Puerto Sagunto	30	11	3	16	738	822	−84	25
10	GlobalCaja C. Encantada	30	11	3	16	789	821	−32	25
11	V. Aranda Autocares Bayo	30	9	4	17	755	820	−65	22
12	Cuatro Rayas Valladolid	30	10	2	18	780	850	−70	22
13	Quabit Guadalajara	30	9	2	19	795	861	−66	20
14	Frigoríficos del Morrazo	30	9	1	20	761	862	−101	19
15	Academia Octavio	30	8	3	19	801	906	−105	19
16	ARS Palma del Río	30	5	2	23	744	866	−122	12

EHF Champions League
EHF Cup
Relegated to División de Plata

- BM Atlético Madrid was disbanded at end of season.

2012–13 Liga ASOBAL winners
(Catalonia)
Barcelona Borges
Twelfth title

== Awards ==
Ideal team is

Position	Player	Team
MVP	(Spain) Julen Aguinagalde	BM Atlético Madrid
Goalkeeper	(Bosnia and Herzegovina) Danijel Šarić	FC Barcelona Intersport
Left wing	(Spain) Juanín García	FC Barcelona Intersport
Pivot	(Spain) Julen Aguinagalde	BM Atlético Madrid
Right wing	(Spain) Víctor Tomás	FC Barcelona Intersport
Left back	(Belarus) Siarhei Rutenka	FC Barcelona Intersport
Central defender	(Spain) Joan Cañellas	BM Atlético Madrid
Right back	(Spain) Alex Dujshebaev	BM Aragón
Coach	(Spain) Jota González	Naturhouse La Rioja
Defender	(Spain) Viran Morros	FC Barcelona Intersport
Newcomer	(Spain) Gonzalo Porras	Cuatro Rayas Valladolid

== Statistics ==
=== Top goalscorers ===
Rank	Name	Team	Goals	GP	GPG
1	(Spain) Alex Dujshebaev	Aragón	198	29	6.83
2	(Spain) Kike Plaza	V. Aranda Autocares Bayo	179	27	6.63
3	(North Macedonia) Kiril Lazarov	Atlético Madrid	156	29	5.38
4	(Spain) Ángel Pérez	GlobalCaja C. Encantada	155	30	5.17
5	(Spain) Joan Saubich	Huesca	155	30	5.17

=== Top goalkeepers ===
Rank	Name	Team	Saves	Shots	%
1	(Spain) Gonzalo Pérez	Fraikin Granollers	428	1109	38.59%
2	(Spain) Jorge Gómez	Quabit Guadalajara	405	1199	33.78%
3	(Spain) Iñaki Malumbres	Reale Ademar León	302	818	36.92%
4	(Spain) Jorge Martínez	Naturhouse La Rioja	287	838	34.25%
5	(Bosnia and Herzegovina) Danijel Šarić	FC Barcelona Intersport	278	656	42.38%

== See also ==
- División de Plata de Balonmano 2012–13
