= 2015–16 Liga ASOBAL =

Liga ASOBAL
- Season: 2015–16
- Champions: FC Barcelona
- Relegated: SD Teucro, BM Aragon
- EHF Champions League: Naturhouse La Rioja
- EHF Cup: Ademar León; BM Granollers; Frigoríficos Morrazo Cangas
- Matches played: 240
- Top goalscorer: Guillermo Corzo (199 goals)

The 2015–16 Liga ASOBAL, also named Liga ASOBAL BAUHAUS by sponsorship reasons, is the 26th season since its establishment. FC Barcelona was the defending champions.

== Promotion and relegation ==
Teams promoted from 2014–15 División de Plata

- SD Teucro
- BM Sinfín

Teams relegated to 2015–16 División de Plata

- MMT Seguros Zamora
- Juanfersa Gijón

== Teams ==
2014–15 Liga Asobal teams

Team	City	Venue	Capacity
Abanca Ademar León	León	Palacio de los Deportes	5,188
Ángel Ximénez P. Genil	Puente Genil	Alcalde Miguel Salas	600
Bada Huesca	Huesca	Palacio de Deportes	5,000
Blas-Gon Villa de Aranda	Aranda de Duero	Príncipe de Asturias	3,000
BM Aragón	Zaragoza	Príncipe Felipe	10,744
BM Benidorm	Benidorm	Palau d'Esports L'Illa	2,500
BM Guadalajara	Guadalajara	Multiusos de Guadalajara	5,894
BM Sinfín	Santander	La Albericia	4,000
FC Barcelona Lassa	Barcelona	Palau Blaugrana	8,250
Fertiberia Puerto Sagunto	Puerto de Sagunto	Pabellón Municipal	1,500
Fraikin Granollers	Granollers	Palau d'Esports	6,500
Frigoríficos del Morrazo	Cangas do Morrazo	O Gatañal	3,000
Globalcaja C. Encantada	Cuenca	El Sargal	1,900
Helvetia Anaitasuna	Pamplona	Anaitasuna	3,000
Naturhouse La Rioja	Logroño	Palacio de los Deportes	3,851
Teucro	Pontevedra	Pavillón Municipal	4,000

== League table ==
Pos	Team	Pld	W	D	L	GF	GA	GD	Pts	Qualification or relegation
1	FC Barcelona Lassa	28	28	0	0	1059	704	+355	56	Qualification to the EHF Champions League
2	Naturhouse La Rioja	28	21	1	6	902	763	+139	43	Qualification to the EHF Champions League
3	Abanca Ademar León	28	17	4	7	821	757	+64	38	Qualification to the EHF Cup
4	Fraikin BM Granollers	28	17	3	8	863	778	+85	37	Qualification to the EHF Cup
5	Frigoríficos del Morrazo	28	12	4	12	764	798	−34	28	Qualification to the EHF Cup
6	Blas-Gon Villa de Aranda	28	11	5	12	817	834	−17	27	
7	Helvetia Anaitasuna	28	11	4	13	768	799	−31	26	
8	BM Benidorm	28	10	4	14	728	796	−68	24	
9	Fertiberia Puerto Sagunto	28	9	4	15	780	850	−70	22	
10	Bada Huesca	28	7	8	13	756	790	−34	22	
11	Globalcaja Ciudad Encantada	28	9	4	15	726	808	−82	22	
12	BM Guadalajara	28	8	5	15	772	822	−50	21	
13	GO FIT	28	8	3	17	758	840	−82	19	
14	Ángel Ximénez Puente Genil	28	8	3	17	712	808	−96	19	
15	Teucro	28	5	6	17	811	890	−79	16	Relegation to División de Plata
16	BM Aragón	0	0	0	0	0	0	0	0	Retired

Updated to match(es) played on 17 April 2016. Source: ASOBAL
