= Balonmano Sinfín =

Spanish handball club

- Full name: Club Deportivo Elemental Sinfín Balonmano
- Nickname(s): Sinfinistas, Sinfineros, Cantabria, Hombres de Negro
- Founded: 2004; 21 years ago
- Arena: Pabellón de La Albericia
- Capacity: 4,000
- President: Servando Revuelta Gil
- Head coach: Rubén Garabaya
- League: Liga ASOBAL

Balonmano Sinfín is a team of handball based in Santander, Spain. It plays in División de Plata de Balonmano.

Location of Balonmano Sinfín

== History ==
The club was founded on April 14, 2004. The men's team started in the Spanish third division. In 2008, they moved up to the second division, and in 2015 to the first division: Liga ASOBAL. The club was relegated from the first division in 2017, but managed to return after just one season. Since 2018, the club has been continuously playing in the first division. In the ASOBAL Cup in 2021, the team reached the final, which they lost against Barcelona.

For sponsorship reasons the club has been called by various name. In 2015-16 by Go Fit Sinfín, in 2018-19 by DS Blendio Sinfin, from 2019 to 2021 as Liberbank Cantabria Sinfín and in 2021-22 as Unicaja Banco Sinfín.

== Crest, colours, supporters ==
=== Kits ===
HOME
2014–15	2016–17	2018–19

AWAY
2015–16	2016–17	2018–19

== Team ==
=== Current squad ===
Squad for the 2022–23 season

Balonmano Sinfín

Goalkeepers

- 12 (Spain) Ernesto Sánchez Diaz
- 92 (Egypt) Mohamed Aly
- 96 (Spain) Israel Marín

Left Wingers

- 7 (Spain) Alberto Pla Castellanos
- 17 (Spain) Diego Monzón

Right Wingers

- 8 (Spain) Marcos Aguilella
- 15 (Spain) Luís Pla Castellanos

Line Players

- 2 (Spain) Diego Muñiz González
- 22 (Spain) Ángel Basualdo
- 29 (Spain) José Manuel Lon
- 72 (Spain) Pablo Rama

Central Backs

- 4 (Argentina) Nicolás Bono
- 5 (Spain) Marcos Domínguez Sanz

Left Backs

- 3 (Spain) Gustavo Alonso Gómez
- 18 (Spain) Leonardo Alonso
- 26 (France) Léo Renaud-David
- 31 (Brazil) Joao Perbelini

Right Backs

- 6 (Spain) Sergio Rubio San Emeterio
- 23 (Spain) Jacob Díaz Aja
- 27 (Spain) Óscar García Sánchez
- 33 (Argentina) Nicolás Zungri

=== Technical staff ===
- Head coach: (Spain) Rubén Garabaya
- Assistant coach: (Spain) Luis Miguel Garabaya
- Fitness coach: (Spain) Javier Palazuelos
- Physiotherapist: (Spain) Javier Martín Izquierdo
- Club Doctor: (Spain) Juan José Díaz-Munío Carabaza

=== Transfers ===
Transfers for the 2025–26 season

Joining

Leaving

- (Spain) Marc López Lozano (LB) to (Spain) BM Benidorm

=== Transfer History ===
Transfers for the 2022–23 season

Joining

- (Egypt) Mohamed Aly (GK) from (France) Angers SCO Handball
- (Argentina) Nicolás Bono (CB) from (Spain) CB Zamora
- (Spain) Marcos Aguilella (RW) from (Spain) CB Ikasa Madrid

Leaving

- (Slovenia) Jaka Malus (CB) to (Germany) Frisch Auf Göppingen
- (Argentina) Ramiro Martínez (RW) to (Spain) BM Benidorm
- (Brazil) Diógenes Cruz (CB) to (Spain) BM Huesca
- (Spain) Francisco Javier Castro (CB) to (Spain) Helvetia Anaitasuna
- (Spain) David Roca Rodríguez (RB) to (Spain) BM Granollers
- (Spain) Pau Guitart (GK) to (Spain) CB Los Dólmenes Antequera
- (Spain) Carlos Lastra (LW) to (Spain) CB Pereda
- (Spain) Alejandro Blázquez (RW) (retires)
- (Spain) Carlos Molina Cosano (LB)

== Previous Squads ==
2020–2021 Team
Shirt No	Nationality	Player	Birth Date	Position
2	Spain	Diego Muñiz González	24 April 1991 (age 34)	Line Player
3	Spain	Sergio Rubio San Emeterio	8 November 2001 (age 24)	Right Back
4	Spain	Javier Valverde	5 January 1998 (age 27)	Left Back
7	Spain	Alberto Pla Castellanos	30 September 1992 (age 33)	Left Winger
8	Spain	Alejandro Blázquez	23 December 1991 (age 34)	Right Winger
10	Spain	Cristian Postigo	7 October 1989 (age 36)	Left Winger
11	Spain	Carlos Lastra	19 January 1999 (age 26)	Left Winger
12	Spain	Ernesto Sánchez Diaz	6 August 1990 (age 35)	Goalkeeper
13	Spain	Gustavo Alonso Gómez	12 September 2002 (age 23)	Left Back
15	Spain	Luís Pla Castellanos	24 June 1998 (age 27)	Right Winger
18	Spain	Leonardo Alonso	18 February 2001 (age 24)	Left Back
20	Argentina	Ramiro Martínez	22 July 1995 (age 30)	Right Winger
22	Spain	Ángel Basualdo	13 September 2001 (age 24)	Line Player
23	Puerto Rico	Jorge Nazario	1 October 1992 (age 33)	Central Back
24	Spain	Francisco Javier Castro	10 September 1996 (age 29)	Central Back
29	Spain	José Manuel Lon	17 February 1977 (age 48)	Line Player
32	Ukraine	Vladyslav Ostroushko	5 March 1986 (age 39)	Left Back
33	Argentina	Nicolás Zungri	19 December 1994 (age 31)	Right Back
34	Spain	Nacho Vallés	18 September 1997 (age 28)	Central Back
88	North Macedonia	Darko Dimitrievski	16 May 1993 (age 32)	Left Back
96	Spain	Israel Marín	1 March 2000 (age 25)	Goalkeeper
99	Cape Verde	Élcio Fernandes	23 September 1996 (age 29)	Goalkeeper

== Season by season ==
Season	Tier	Division	Pos.	Notes	Copa del Rey
2004–05	3	1ª Estatal	5th		
2005–06	3	1ª Estatal	2nd		
2006–07	3	1ª Estatal	1st		
2007–08	3	1ª Estatal	1st	Promoted	
2008–09	2	Div. Honor B	14th		
2009–10	2	Plata	9th		
2010–11	2	Plata	11th		
2011–12	2	Plata	4th		
2012–13	2	Plata	8th		
2013–14	2	Plata	7th		Second round
2014–15	2	Plata	2nd	Promoted	First round
2015–16	1	ASOBAL	13th		Round of 16
2016–17	1	ASOBAL	16th	Relegated	Round of 16
2017–18	1	Plata	5th	Promoted	Third round
2018–19	1	ASOBAL	11th		Second round

== EHF ranking ==
As of 14/12/2022

Rank	Team	Points
277	(Belarus) Dinamo Minsk	4
278	(Sweden) Lugi HF	4
279	(Netherlands) HV Aalsmeer	4
280	(Spain) Balonmano Sinfín	3
281	(Spain) AD Ciudad de Guadalajara	3
282	(France) US Ivry Handball	3
283	(Hungary) Mezőkövesdi KC	3

== Former club members ==
=== Notable former players ===
- (Spain) Francisco Javier Castro (2019–2022)
- (Spain) Pablo Paredes (2015–2017)
- (Argentina) Nicolás Bono (2022–)
- (Argentina) Ramiro Martínez (2020–2022)
- (Cape Verde) Élcio Fernandes (2019–2021)
- (Egypt) Mohamed Aly (2022–)
- (North Macedonia) Darko Dimitrievski (2018-2021)
- (Montenegro) Mile Mijušković (2019-2020)
- (Portugal) Gonçalo Ribeiro (2020)
- (Romania) Darius Makaria (2016–2017)
- (Slovenia) Jaka Malus (2022)
- (Ukraine) Vladyslav Ostroushko (2021)

=== Former coaches ===
Seasons	Coach	Country
2008–2011	Juan Domínguez Munaiz	(Spain)
2011–2020	Rodrigo Reñones	(Spain)
2020–2022	Víctor Montesinos	(Spain)
2022–	Rubén Garabaya	(Spain)
