= BM Puerto Sagunto =

Spanish handball club

Fertiberia Puerto Sagunto
- Full name: Club Balonmano Puerto Sagunto
- Founded: 1951
- Arena: Pabellón Municipal, Puerto Sagunto, Valencian Community, Spain
- Capacity: 1,500
- President: Juanjo Bataller
- Head coach: Patxi Martí
- League: Liga ASOBAL
- 2014–15: Liga ASOBAL, 10th
Home	Away

Club Balonmano Puerto Sagunto is a handball club based in Sagunto, Valencian Community. Puerto Sagunto was founded in 1951 and has played in Liga ASOBAL since the 2012–13 season despite its finish as the bottom team in the 2011–12 season.

== Team ==
=== Current squad ===
Squad for the 2026–27 season

Goalkeepers
Left Wingers
Right Wingers

- (Slovenia) Jakob Pelko

Line players

- (Brazil) Alexandro Pozzer
- (Spain) Miguel Llorens
- (Spain) Guillermo Soler Méndez

Left Backs
Central Backs

- (Spain) Alberto Serradilla

Right Backs

- (Argentina) Nicolás Zungri
- (Spain) Gabriel Navarro

=== Transfers ===
Transfers for the 2026–27 season

Joining

- (Spain) Miguel Llorens (LP) from (Spain) BM Proin Triana
- (Spain) Guillermo Soler Méndez (LP) from (Spain) CD Agustinos Alicante
- (Spain) Gabriel Navarro (RB) from (Spain) OAR BM Coruña

Leaving

- (Spain) Julen Urruzola (LP) to (Spain) AD Ciudad de Guadalajara
- (Spain) Oriol Teixidor (LB) to (Spain) SD Atlético Novás

=== Transfer History ===
Transfers for the 2025–26 season

Joining

- (Brazil) Alexandro Pozzer (LP) from (Spain) BM Rebi Cuenca
- (Argentina) Nicolás Zungri (RB) from (Spain) Helvetia Anaitasuna
- (Slovenia) Jakob Pelko (RW) from (Slovenia) RD Šmartno
- (Spain) Alberto Serradilla (CB) from (Spain) AD Ciudad de Guadalajara
- (Spain) Julen Urruzola (LP) from (Spain) CB Eón Alicante
- (Spain) Oriol Teixidor (LB) from (Spain) SD Atlético Novás

Leaving

== Season by season ==
Season	Tier	Division	Pos.	Notes
1990–91	2	1ª Nacional	5th (Group II)	
1991–92	2	1ª Nacional	8th (Group III)	
1992–93	2	1ª Nacional	5th (Group II)	
1993–94	2	1ª Nacional	4th (Group II)	
1994–95	2	Honor B	7th	
1995–96	2	Honor B	15th	
1996–97	2	Honor B	17th	Relegated
1997–98	3	1ª Nacional	12th (Group C)	
1998–99	3	1ª Nacional	14th (Group C)	Relegated
1999–00	4	2ª Nacional	1st	Promoted
2000–01	3	1ª Nacional	3rd (Group C)	
2001–02	3	1ª Nacional	8th (Group C)	
2002–03	3	1ª Nacional	7th (Group D)	
2003–04	3	1ª Nacional	5th (Group C)	
2004–05	3	1ª Nacional	6th (Group D)	
2005–06	3	1ª Nacional	4th (Group D)	
2006–07	3	1ª Nacional	1st (Group C)	
2007–08	3	1ª Nacional	1st (Group C)	Promoted

Season	Tier	Division	Pos.	Notes
2008–09	2	Honor B	10th	
2009–10	2	Plata	1st	Promoted
2010–11	1	ASOBAL	12th	
2011–12	1	ASOBAL	16th	
2012–13	1	ASOBAL	9th	
2013–14	1	ASOBAL	13th	
2014–15	1	ASOBAL	10th	
2015–16	1	ASOBAL	12th	
2016–17	1	ASOBAL	12th	
2017–18	1	ASOBAL	15th	Relegated
2018–19	2	Plata	2nd	Promoted
2019–20	1	ASOBAL	11th	
2020–21	1	ASOBAL	16th	Relegated
2021–22	2	Plata	5th	
2022–23	2	Plata	1st	Promoted
2023–24	1	ASOBAL	16th	Relegated
2024–25	2	Plata	TBD	

- 11 seasons in Liga ASOBAL

== Stadium information ==
- Name: - Pabellón Municipal de Puerto Sagunto – inaugural year (1975)
- City: - Puerto Sagunto, Sagunto
- Capacity: - 2.000 people
- Address: - Carretera Sagunto-Puerto Sagunto, Km 2,3

== Notable famous players ==
- (Slovenia) Ognjen Backovič
- (Lithuania) Rolandas Bernatonis
- (North Macedonia) Darko Dimitrievski
- (Bosnia and Herzegovina) Nikola Dokić
- (Serbia) Ivan Lapčević
- (Brazil) Alexandro Pozzer
- (Bosnia and Herzegovina) Nikola Prce
- (France) Seufyann Sayad
