= 2013–14 División de Plata de Balonmano =

División de Plata
- Season: 2013–14
- Champions: FC Barcelona B
- Relegated: Ereintza Aguaplast
- Matches: 240
- Goals: 13,490 (56.21 per match)
- Top goalscorer: David Jiménez, 207 goals
- Biggest home win: Calmec Barakaldo 41–25 ARS Palma del Río
- Biggest away win: Go Fit Sinfín 23–36 Meridiano Antequera
- Highest scoring: Calmec Barakaldo 40–36 Go Fit Sinfín; ARS Palma del Río 39–37 Bordils

The 2013–14 season of the División de Plata de Balonmano is the 20th season of second-tier handball in Spain.

Regular season started in September 2013 and finished on 10 May, 2014. After completing 30 matchdays, top team is promoted to Liga ASOBAL, and teams qualified 2nd, 3rd, 4th and 5th play the promotion playoff.

FC Barcelona B was the champion team, but due to its reserve status, they can't promote to Liga ASOBAL. Next team in standings (2nd), MMT Seguros Zamora, was promoted to Liga ASOBAL.

== Competition rules ==
The championship consist of 16 teams playing each other twice for a total of 30 matchdays. At end of regular season, the top team in the standings is promoted to Liga ASOBAL. Teams in 2nd, 3rd, 4th and 5th place play the promotion playoff for a single spot in Liga ASOBAL. Bottom team is relegated to Primera División Estatal while teams in 13th, 14th and 15th play the relegation playoff.

Points during regular season are awarded as following;

Each victory adds 2 points to the winner team.

Each drawn adds 1 point to each team.

== Promotion and relegation ==
Once finished 2013–14 regular season.

Teams promoted to Liga ASOBAL 2014–15

- MMT Seguros Zamora – 2nd at standings
- Servigroup Benidorm – via playoffs

Teams relegated to 2014–15 Primera Nacional

- Ereintza Aguaplast

== Teams ==
Location of teams in División de Plata 2013–14

| Team | Location | Stadium | Capacity |
|---|---|---|---|
| Academia Octavio | Vigo | As Travesas | 4,500 |
| ARS Palma del Río | Palma del Río | El Pandero | 1,500 |
| FC Barcelona B | Barcelona | Palau Blaugrana | 7,500 |
| Alcobendas | Alcobendas | Los Sueños | 1,000 |
| Teucro | Pontevedra | Pavillón Municipal | 4,000 |
| Torrelavega | Torrelavega | Vicente Trueba | 5,375 |
| Go Fit Sinfín | Santander | La Albericia | 4,000 |
| Pozoblanco | Pozoblanco | Juan Sepúlveda | 1,500 |
| Calmec Barakaldo | Barakaldo | Lasesarre | 2,576 |
| Amenabar Zarautz | Zarautz | Polideportivo Municipal | 3,000 |
| Ereintza Aguaplast | Errenteria | Galtzaraborda | 1,000 |
| Bordils | Bordils | Pavelló Blanc i Verd | 500 |
| Servigroup Benidorm | Benidorm | Palau d'Esports L'Illa | 1,000 |
| MMT Seguros Zamora | Zamora | Manuel Camba | 500 |
| Meridiano Antequera | Antequera | Fernando Argüelles | 2,575 |
| Construcciones Castro Chapela | Chapela | Pabellón Municipal | 600 |

== Regular season standings ==
| Pos | Team | Pld | W | D | L | GF | GA | GD | Pts | Promotion or relegation |
|---|---|---|---|---|---|---|---|---|---|---|
| 1 | FC Barcelona B (Note: FC Barcelona B can't promote to Liga ASOBAL due its reserve team status.) | 30 | 20 | 5 | 5 | 920 | 788 | +132 | 45 | |
| 2 | MMT Seguros Zamora | 30 | 18 | 3 | 9 | 913 | 841 | +72 | 39 | Promoted |
| 3 | Alcobendas | 30 | 19 | 1 | 10 | 867 | 800 | +67 | 39 | Promotion playoff |
| 4 | Servigroup Benidorm | 30 | 18 | 3 | 9 | 827 | 785 | +42 | 39 | Promotion playoff |
| 5 | Amenabar Zarautz | 30 | 18 | 1 | 11 | 824 | 816 | +8 | 37 | Promotion playoff |
| 6 | Calmec Barakaldo | 30 | 15 | 4 | 11 | 897 | 895 | +2 | 34 | Promotion playoff |
| 7 | Got Fit Sinfín | 30 | 16 | 1 | 13 | 852 | 860 | −8 | 33 | |
| 8 | Meridiano Antequera | 29 | 16 | 3 | 10 | 856 | 835 | +21 | 33 (Note: 2 points deducted?) | |
| 9 | Academia Octavio | 30 | 14 | 3 | 13 | 863 | 831 | +32 | 31 | |
| 10 | Torrelavega | 30 | 13 | 3 | 14 | 837 | 811 | +26 | 29 | |
| 11 | Bordils | 30 | 13 | 2 | 15 | 869 | 863 | +6 | 28 | |
| 12 | Teucro | 30 | 12 | 4 | 14 | 838 | 839 | −1 | 28 | |
| 13 | Pozoblanco | 30 | 13 | 1 | 16 | 815 | 819 | −4 | 27 | Relegation round |
| 14 | Construcciones Castro Chapela | 30 | 7 | 5 | 18 | 800 | 860 | −60 | 19 | Relegation round |
| 15 | ARS Palma del Río | 30 | 5 | 1 | 24 | 730 | 875 | −145 | 9 (Note: 2 points deducted?) | Relegation round |
| 16 | Ereintza Aguaplast | 30 | 2 | 2 | 26 | 782 | 972 | −190 | 6 | Relegated |

== Promotion playoff ==
Winner of Final will be promoted to Liga ASOBAL for 2014–15 season.

- Host team: Alcobendas
- City: Alcobendas, Community of Madrid
- Venue: Pabellón de los Sueños and Pabellón Amaya Valdemoro
- Date: 24–25 May 2014

=== Bracket ===
Semifinals
3 | Alcobendas | 30
6 | Calmec Barakaldo | 22
4 | Servigroup Benidorm | 26
5 | Amenabar Zarautz | 22

Final
3 | Alcobendas | 25
4 | Servigroup Benidorm | 26
Third place
6 | Calmec Barakaldo | 22
5 | Amenabar Zarautz | 31

Promoted to Liga ASOBAL

=== Semifinals ===
| 24 May; 17:00 (UTC+2) | Alcobendas | 30–22 | Calmec Barakaldo | Pabellón de los Sueños, Alcobendas; Referees: Álvarez Jiménez, Friera Cavada |
| 24 May; 17:00 (UTC+2) | | (13–10) | | Pabellón de los Sueños, Alcobendas; Referees: Álvarez Jiménez, Friera Cavada |

| 24 May; 19:15 (UTC+2) | Servigroup Benidorm | 26–22 | Amenabar Zarautz | Pabellón de los Sueños, Alcobendas; Referees: San Pedro Colorado, Miranda Bedate |
| 24 May; 19:15 (UTC+2) | | (13–11) | | Pabellón de los Sueños, Alcobendas; Referees: San Pedro Colorado, Miranda Bedate |

=== Third place ===
| 25 May; 10:30 (UTC+2) | Calmec Barakaldo | 22–31 | Amenabar Zarautz | Pabellón Amaya Valdemoro, Alcobendas; Referees: Friera Cavada, Álvarez Menéndez |
| 25 May; 10:30 (UTC+2) | | (8–16) | | Pabellón Amaya Valdemoro, Alcobendas; Referees: Friera Cavada, Álvarez Menéndez |

=== Final ===
| 25 May; 12:30 (UTC+2) | Alcobendas | 25–26 (a.e.t.) | Servigroup Benidorm | Pabellón Amaya Valdemoro, Alcobendas; Referees: Fernández Molina, Murillo Castro |
| 25 May; 12:30 (UTC+2) | | (12–8) | | Pabellón Amaya Valdemoro, Alcobendas; Referees: Fernández Molina, Murillo Castro |

== Relegation round ==
Two last teams in the table will be relegated to Primera División for 2014–15 season.

- Host team: Pozoblanco
- City: Pozoblanco, Andalusia
- Venue: Pabellón Municipal Juan Sepúlveda
- Date: 23–25 May 2014

=== Standings ===
| Pos | Team | Pld | W | D | L | GF | GA | GD | Pts | Relegation |
|---|---|---|---|---|---|---|---|---|---|---|
| 1 | ARS Palma del Río | 2 | 2 | 0 | 0 | 55 | 48 | +7 | 4 | |
| 2 | Pozoblanco | 2 | 1 | 0 | 1 | 52 | 55 | −3 | 2 | Relegated |
| 3 | Construcciones Castro Chapela | 2 | 0 | 0 | 2 | 52 | 56 | −4 | 0 | Relegated |

=== Matches ===
| 23 May; 21:00 (UTC+2) | ARS Palma del Río | 28–23 | Pozoblanco | Pabellón Juan Sepúlveda, Pozoblanco; Attendance: 500; Referees: Gallardo Cabello, Sergio Fco. & Fco. José |
| 23 May; 21:00 (UTC+2) | Perella 8 | (11–8) | Casado 7 | Pabellón Juan Sepúlveda, Pozoblanco; Attendance: 500; Referees: Gallardo Cabello, Sergio Fco. & Fco. José |
| 23 May; 21:00 (UTC+2) | 3× (suspension) | Report | 4× (suspension) 1× (red card) | Pabellón Juan Sepúlveda, Pozoblanco; Attendance: 500; Referees: Gallardo Cabello, Sergio Fco. & Fco. José |

| 24 May; 18:30 (UTC+2) | Construcciones Castro Chapela | 25–27 | ARS Palma del Río | Pabellón Juan Sepúlveda, Pozoblanco; Attendance: 200; Referees: Muñoz Díaz, Posada González |
| 24 May; 18:30 (UTC+2) | González 7 | (14–12) | Ortiz 7 | Pabellón Juan Sepúlveda, Pozoblanco; Attendance: 200; Referees: Muñoz Díaz, Posada González |
| 24 May; 18:30 (UTC+2) | 5× (suspension) 1× (red card) | Report | 2× (suspension) | Pabellón Juan Sepúlveda, Pozoblanco; Attendance: 200; Referees: Muñoz Díaz, Posada González |

| 25 May; 12:30 (UTC+2) | Pozoblanco | 29–27 | Construcciones Castro Chapela | Pabellón Juan Sepúlveda, Pozoblanco; Attendance: 150; Referees: Amigo Plaza, García de la Galana |
| 25 May; 12:30 (UTC+2) | Casado 9 | (15–16) | Chema Cid 9 | Pabellón Juan Sepúlveda, Pozoblanco; Attendance: 150; Referees: Amigo Plaza, García de la Galana |
| 25 May; 12:30 (UTC+2) | 3× (suspension) | Report | 5× (suspension) | Pabellón Juan Sepúlveda, Pozoblanco; Attendance: 150; Referees: Amigo Plaza, García de la Galana |

Relegated to Primera División 2014–15
| Pozoblanco | Construcciones Castro Chapela |

== Top goal scorers ==
| Player | Goals | Team |
|---|---|---|
| (Spain) David Jiménez | 207 | Servigroup Benidorm |
| (Spain) Álex Álvarez | 201 | Go Fit Sinfín |
| (Spain) David Aguirrezabalaga | 190 | Amenabar Zarautz |
| (Spain) Octavio Magadán | 183 | MMT Seguros Zamora |
| (Spain) Jorge Martín | 172 | MMT Seguros Zamora |
| (Spain) Guillermo Barbón | 171 | Torrelavega |
| (Spain) Oier García | 170 | Calmec Barakaldo |
| (Spain) Carlos García | 164 | Teucro |
| (Spain) David Pichel | 164 | Teucro |
| (Spain) Chema Cid | 155 | Construcciones Castro Chapela |
