= 2014–15 División de Plata de Balonmano =

División de Plata
- Season: 2014–15
- Champions: SD Teucro
- Promoted: SD Teucro; Go Fit
- Relegated: Automobica Barakaldo; Interestar Maristas Algemesí; Torrelavega
- Matches played: 240
- Goals scored: 13,454 (56.06 per match)
- Top goalscorer: Fernando Hernández 241
- Biggest home win: Go Fit 39–23 Handbol Bordils
- Biggest away win: Amenabar Zarautz 19–32 BM Atlético Valladolid
- Highest scoring: SD Teucro 43–32 La Roca

The 2014–15 season of the División de Plata de Balonmano was the 21st season of second-tier handball in Spain.

Regular season began on 13 September 2014 and finished on 16 May 2015. After completing 30 matchdays, top team was promoted to Liga ASOBAL, while teams qualified 2nd, 3rd, 4th and 5th played the promotion playoff. The three bottom teams were relegated to Primera Estatal.

SD Teucro won regular season's first position, promoting to Liga ASOBAL for 2015–16 season. Go Fit won the promotion playoff and clinched the second promotion spot.

== Competition rules ==
The championship consist of 16 teams playing each other twice for a total of 30 matchdays. At end of regular season, the top team in the standings is promoted to Liga ASOBAL. Teams in 2nd, 3rd, 4th and 5th place play the promotion playoff for a single spot in Liga ASOBAL. Bottom three teams are relegated to Primera División Estatal.

Points during regular season are awarded as following;

Each victory adds 2 points to the winner team.

Each drawn adds 1 point to each team.

== Promotion and relegation ==
Once finished 2014–15 regular season.

Teams promoted to Liga ASOBAL 2015–16

- Teucro – regular season champions
- Go Fit – promotion playoff winners

Teams relegated to 2014–15 Primera Nacional

- Torrelavega
- Automobica Barakaldo
- Interstar Deporte Algemesí

== Teams ==
Location of teams in División de Plata 2014–15

Team	Location	Stadium	Capacity
Bidasoa Irun	Irun	Polideportivo Artaleku	2,200
FC Barcelona B	Barcelona	Palau Blaugrana	7,500
UCAM Alcobendas	Alcobendas	Los Sueños	1,000
Amenabar Zarautz	Zarautz	Polideportivo Municipal	3,000
Automobica Barakaldo	Barakaldo	Lasesarre	2,576
Go Fit	Santander	La Albericia	4,000
Meridiano Antequera	Antequera	Fernando Argüelles	2,575
Academia Octavio	Vigo	As Travesas	4,500
Torrelavega	Torrelavega	Vicente Trueba	5,375
Bordils	Bordils	Pavelló Blanc i Verd	500
Teucro	Pontevedra	Pavillón Municipal	4,000
Zumosol ARS Palma del Río	Palma del Río	El Pandero	1,500
Atlético Valladolid	Valladolid	Huerta del Rey	3,500
La Roca	La Roca del Vallès	Pavelló Nou	1,000
Viveros Herol Nava	Nava de la Asunción	Polideportivo Municipal	700
Interstar Deporte Algemesí	Algemesí	9 d'Octubre	1,000

== Regular season standings ==
Pos	Team	Pld	W	D	L	GF	GA	GD	Pts	Qualification or relegation
1	Teucro	30	24	2	4	957	830	+127	50	Promotion to Liga ASOBAL
2	Go Fit	30	21	3	6	912	800	+112	45	Qualified to promotion playoff
3	FC Barcelona B	30	21	2	7	916	823	+93	44	
4	Atlético Valladolid	30	19	6	5	859	772	+87	44	Qualified to promotion playoff
5	Bidasoa Irun	30	19	2	9	849	780	+69	40	Qualified to promotion playoff
6	Viveros Herol Nava	30	17	3	10	804	776	+28	37	Qualified to promotion playoff
7	UCAM Alcobendas	30	15	6	9	818	788	+30	36	
8	Academia Octavio	30	13	2	15	860	893	−33	28	
9	Zumosol ARS Palma del Río	30	11	4	15	835	819	+16	26	
10	Bordils	30	11	3	16	837	884	−47	25	
11	La Roca	30	8	5	17	820	887	−67	21	
12	Meridiano Antequera	30	9	3	18	817	858	−41	21	
13	Amenabar Zarautz	30	8	3	19	819	882	−63	19	
14	Torrelavega	30	8	2	20	784	853	−69	18	Relegation to Primera División
15	Automobica Barakaldo	30	7	3	20	790	870	−80	17	Relegation to Primera División
16	Interstar Deporte Algemesí	30	3	3	24	777	939	−162	9	Relegation to Primera División

Updated to match(es) played on 17 May 2015. Source: División de Plata and rfebm.net
Rules for classification: 1) points; 2) head-to-head points; 3) head-to-head goal difference; 4) goal difference; 5) number of goals scored

== Promotion playoff ==
Winner of Promotion playoff final will play in Liga ASOBAL 2015–16 season.

- Host team: Go Fit
- City: Santander, Cantabria
- Venue: Pabellón de La Albericia
- Date: 30–31 May 2015

=== Bracket ===
Semifinals
2	Go Fit	32
6	Viveros Herol Nava	22
4	BM Atlético Valladolid	31
5	Bidasoa Irun	20

Final
2	Go Fit	30^{(6)}
4	BM Atlético Valladolid	30^{(5)}
Third place
6	Viveros Herol Nava	20
5	Bidasoa Irun	27

=== Semifinals ===
30 May; 17:30 (UTC+2)	Go Fit	32–22	Viveros Herol Nava	La Albericia, Santander; Attendance: 2,500; Referees: Amigo Plaza, García de la Galana
30 May; 17:30 (UTC+2)	Herrero 7	(14–8)	Ajo 6	La Albericia, Santander; Attendance: 2,500; Referees: Amigo Plaza, García de la Galana
30 May; 17:30 (UTC+2)	3× (suspension)	Report	2× (yellow card) 6× (suspension) 1× (red card)	La Albericia, Santander; Attendance: 2,500; Referees: Amigo Plaza, García de la Galana

30 May; 20:00 (UTC+2)	Atlético Valladolid	31–20	Bidasoa Irun	La Albericia, Santander; Attendance: 2,500; Referees: Álvarez Menéndez, Friera Cavada
30 May; 20:00 (UTC+2)	F Hernández 9	(11–10)	Crowley 7	La Albericia, Santander; Attendance: 2,500; Referees: Álvarez Menéndez, Friera Cavada
30 May; 20:00 (UTC+2)	1× (yellow card) 4× (suspension)	Report	3× (yellow card) 4× (suspension)	La Albericia, Santander; Attendance: 2,500; Referees: Álvarez Menéndez, Friera Cavada

=== Third place ===
31 May; 10:15 (UTC+2)	Viveros Herol Nava	20–27	Bidasoa Irun	La Albericia, Santander; Referees: Álvarez Menéndez, Friera Cavada
31 May; 10:15 (UTC+2)	Villagrán 7	(8–14)	C Martínez 6	La Albericia, Santander; Referees: Álvarez Menéndez, Friera Cavada
31 May; 10:15 (UTC+2)	4× (suspension)	Report	5× (suspension)	La Albericia, Santander; Referees: Álvarez Menéndez, Friera Cavada

=== Final ===
31 May; 12:30 (UTC+2)	Go Fit	30–30 (a.e.t.) (6–5 p)	BM Atlético Valladolid	La Albericia, Santander; Attendance: 2,500; Referees: Yagüe Moro, Peñaranda Ortega
31 May; 12:30 (UTC+2)	three players 5	(14–16)	F Hernández 11	La Albericia, Santander; Attendance: 2,500; Referees: Yagüe Moro, Peñaranda Ortega
31 May; 12:30 (UTC+2)	3× (suspension)	Report	5× (suspension)	La Albericia, Santander; Attendance: 2,500; Referees: Yagüe Moro, Peñaranda Ortega

Promoted to Liga ASOBAL
Go Fit
(First time ever)

== Top goal scorers ==
Rank	Player	Team	Goals	Matches	Avg.
1	(Spain) Fernando Hernández	Atlético Valladolid	241	29	8,31
2	(Spain) Eduard Nonó	Bordils	224	30	7,47
3	(Spain) Alexis Rodríguez	Meridiano Antequera	208	28	7,43
4	(Spain) David Fernández	Viveros Herol Nava	186	30	6,2
5	(Spain) José Carlos Hernández	Torrelavega	184	29	6,34
6	(Spain) Luisma Lorasque	Interstar Deporte Algemesí	179	30	5,97
7	(Spain) David Aguirrezabalaga	Amenabar Zarautz	175	28	6,25
8	(Spain) Carlos García	Teucro	170	29	5,86
8	(Spain) Oier García	Automobica Barakaldo	170	29	5.86
10	(Spain) Álex Álvarez	Go Fit	169	27	6,26
