= BM Villa de Aranda =

Spanish handball club

Villa de Aranda
- Full name: Club Balonmano Villa de Aranda
- Founded: 2000
- Arena: Príncipe de Asturias, Aranda de Duero, Castile and León, Spain
- Capacity: 2,800
- President: (Spain) Fernando Peña
- Head coach: (Spain) Jacobo Cuétara
- League: Liga ASOBAL
- 2024-25: 9th
Home	Away

Club Balonmano Villa de Aranda is a handball team based in Aranda de Duero, Province of Burgos, Castile and León. It was founded in 2000 and made its debut in Liga ASOBAL in 2012–13 season after achieving the promotion from División de Plata in 2011–12 season.

== Crest, colours, supporters ==
=== Kits ===
AWAY
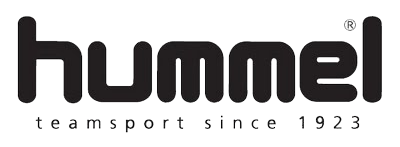
2016-17

== Season by season ==
Season	Tier	Division	Pos.	Notes
2000–01	4	2ª Estatal		Promoted
2001–02	3	1ª Estatal	6th	
2002–03	3	1ª Estatal	2nd	Promoted
2003–04	2	Honor B	11th	
2004–05	2	Honor B	9th	
2005–06	2	Honor B	6th	
2006–07	2	Honor B	9th	
2007–08	2	Honor B	4th	

Season	Tier	Division	Pos.	Notes
2008–09	2	Honor B	6th	
2009–10	2	Plata	12th	
2010–11	2	Plata	10th	
2011–12	2	Plata	5th	Promoted
2012–13	1	ASOBAL	11th	
2013–14	1	ASOBAL	14th	
2014–15	1	ASOBAL	8th	
2015–16	1	ASOBAL		

- 3 season in Liga ASOBAL
- 9 seasons in División de Plata

== Current squad 2015/16 ==
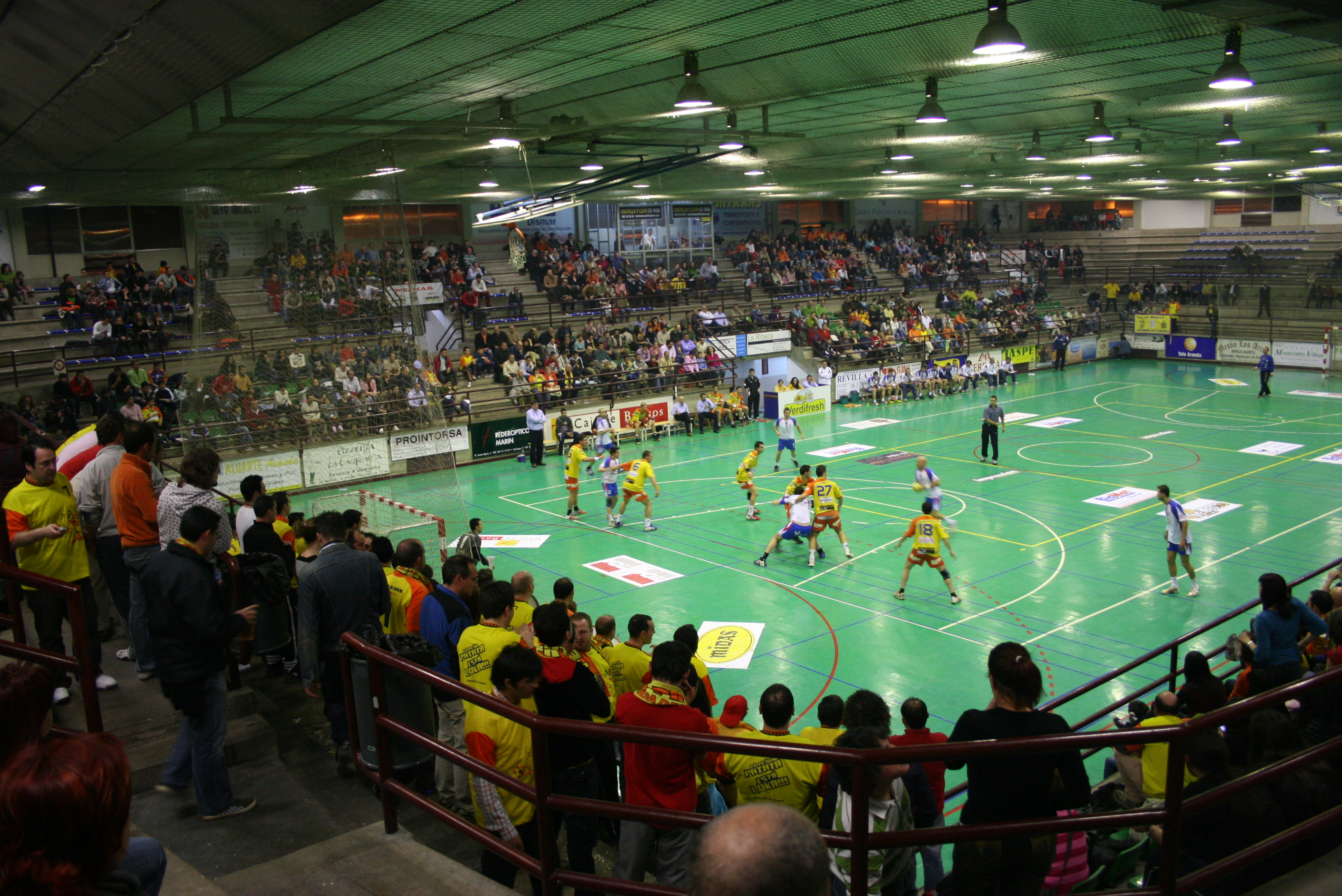
Pabellón Príncipe de Asturias, in a game of División de Honor B in 2008.

Goalkeepers
- 01 (Spain) Luis Lucia Velasquez
- 12 (Spain) Javier Santana Herrera
- 16 (Brazil) Rangel Luan da Rosa

Line players
- 05 (Spain) Ignacio Pecina Tome
- 06 (Estonia) Armi Pärt
- 20 (Spain) Tomas Moreira

Wingers
- 14 (Spain) Javi Muñoz
- 15 (Spain) Bicho
- 19 (Spain) Victor Megias
- 77 (Spain) Guillermo Martín Carazo
- 93 (Spain) Manuel García Pascual

Back players
- 03 (Spain) Marc Canyigueral
- 09 (Spain) Juan Luis Ayala
- 23 (Russia) Michail Revin
- 24 (Brazil) Matheus Perrella
- 26 (Brazil) Oswaldo Guimarães
- 33 (Bosnia and Herzegovina) Amir Cakic

Technical staff
- Head coach (Spain) Jacobo Cuétara
- Assistant coach (Spain) Jordi Lluelles

=== Transfers ===
Transfers for the 2026–27 season

Joining

- (Cuba) Samuel Cordiés (CB) from (Spain) BM Huesca
- (Iran) Mehran Rahnama (LB) from (Romania) AHC Potaissa Turda
- (Bosnia and Herzegovina) (Spain) Filip Šarić (GK) from (Spain) FC Barcelona
- (Sweden) Noah Martinsson (LW) from (Sweden) HF Karlskrona
- (Spain) Artur Parera (LP) from (Spain) BM Huesca
- (Spain) Robert Rosell (LP) from (France) US Ivry Handball
- (Spain) Jorge Romanillos (LP) from (Spain) CB Caserío Ciudad Real
- (Serbia) Uroš Ostojić (LB) back from loan at (Spain) BM Benidorm

Leaving

- (Latvia) Jevgenijs Rogonovs (LP) to (France) Istres Provence Handball
- (Spain) Vicente Poveda (LB) to (Spain) BM Benidorm
- (Spain) Asier Iribar (LB) loan back to (Spain) CD Bidasoa
- (Poland) Jakub Sladkowski (LP) loan back to (Spain) CD Bidasoa

=== Transfer History ===
Transfers for the 2025–26 season

Joining

- (Latvia) Andis Bors (RW) from (Latvia) Murjāņu SG
- (Portugal) Francisco Pereira (CB) from (France) JS Cherbourg
- (Serbia) Uroš Ostojić (LB) from (Serbia) RK Obilić
- (Hungary) Tamás Jánosi (LB) from (Hungary) Balatonfüredi KSE
- (Poland) Jakub Sladkowski (LP) on loan from (Spain) CD Bidasoa
- (Spain) Vicente Poveda (LB) from (Spain) AD Ciudad de Guadalajara
- (Spain) Mateo Arias Buceta (LW) from (Spain) BM Cisne
- (Spain) Asier Iribar (LB) on loan from (Spain) CD Bidasoa

Leaving

- (Argentina) Guillermo Fischer (LB) to (Spain) BM Granollers
- (Ukraine) Maksym Viunik (GK) to (Hungary) Carbonex-Komló
- (Spain) Pol Roy Trullols (LW) to (Spain) BM Benidorm
- (Spain) Rubén Fernández Domínguez (LP) to (Spain) Atlético Novás
- (Spain) Samuel Saiz (LB) loan back to (Spain) CB Ademar León
- (Colombia) Santiago Mosquera Mayo (LB) loan back to (Spain) BM Rebi Cuenca
- (Serbia) Uroš Ostojić (LB) on loan at (Spain) BM Benidorm

== Stadium information ==
- Name: - Príncipe de Asturias
- City: - Aranda de Duero
- Capacity: - 2,800 seats
- Address: - Calle Pizarro, s/n
