= Darko Martinović =

Bosnian-Herzegovinian handball player

Personal information
- Born: September 18, 1982 (age 44) Mostar, SR Bosnia and Herzegovina
- Height: 1.94 m (6 ft 4 1/2 in)

Sport
- Sport: Handball
- Position: Right Back
- Number: 2

Senior clubs
- Years: Team
- 1999-2003: (Bosnia and Herzegovina) HMRK Zrinjski
- 2003–2006: (Bosnia and Herzegovina) HRK Izviđač
- 2006-2009: (Bosnia and Herzegovina) RK Bosna Sarajevo
- 2009-2010: (Spain) Toledo BM
- 2010-2013: (Sweden) IFK Kristianstad
National team
Years	Team	Apps	(Gls)
2002-	Bosnia and Herzegovina	73	(129)
- Updated on July 2013 (UTC)

Darko Martinović (born 18 September 1982) is a Bosnian professional handballer, playing as right back.
