= Agustín Casado =

Spanish handball player (born 1996)

Personal information
- Full name: Agustín Casado Marcelo
- Born: 21 May 1996 (age 30) Carboneras, Spain
- Height: 1.93 m (6 ft 4 in)

Sport
- Sport: Handball
- Position: Centre back
- Current club: ONE Veszprém
- Number: 88

Senior clubs
- Years: Team
- 2013–2014: Club Balonmano Pozoblanco
- 2014–2016: BM Huesca
- 2015–2016: → ARS Palma del Río (loan)
- 2016–2017: ARS Palma del Río
- 2017–2020: BM Nava
- 2020–2022: BM Logroño La Rioja
- 2022–2023: MT Melsungen
- 2023–2025: ONE Veszprém
- 2025–: Montpellier Handball
National team
Years	Team	Apps	(Gls)
2021–	Spain	62	(166)
Medal record
Olympic Games
Bronze medal – third place	2024 Paris	Team
World Championship
Bronze medal – third place	2023 Poland/Sweden
European Championship
Silver medal – second place	2022 Hungary/Slovakia
- Updated on 13 January 2025

Agustín Casado Marcelo (Note: In this Spanish name, the first or paternal surname is Casado and the second or maternal family name is Marcelo.) (born 21 May 1996) is a Spanish handball player for ONE Veszprém and the Spanish national team.

He represented Spain at the 2022 European Men's Handball Championship.
