= Xavier Pascual =

Xavier Pascual may refer to:

- Xavier Pascual Fuertes (born 1968), Spanish former handballer and handball coach.
- Xavi Pascual (basketball) (born 1972), Spanish basketball coach.
