= Darius Makaria =

Romanian handballer (born 1993)

Personal information
- Full name: Darius-Cătălin Makaria
- Nationality: Romanian
- Born: 2 February 1993 (age 33) Baia Mare, Romania
- Height: 1.93 m (6 ft 4 in)

Sport
- Sport: Handball
- Position: Goalkeeper
- Current club: Cavigal Nice Handball
- Number: 16

Youth career
- Years: Team
- 2005–2011: CS Extrem Baia Mare
- 2009–2012: CNOE Sighisoara

Senior clubs
- Years: Team
- 2011–2013: CSM București
- 2013–2016: Dinamo București
- 2016–2017: BM Sinfín
- 2017–2018: Club Balonmano Benidorm
- 2018–: Cavigal Nice Handball
National team
- Years: Team
- 2008–2010: Romania U19
- 2010–2012: Romania U21
- 2014–: Romania
Medal record
World University Championship
Gold medal – first place	2016 Spain	Team

Darius Cătălin Makaria (born 2 February 1993) is a Romanian handballer who plays as a goalkeeper for Cavigal Nice Handball in the France ProLigue.

== Achievements ==
- Junior National Championship :
  - Gold Medalist: 2012
  - Silver Medalist: 2009, 2011
- Liga Națională:
  - Gold Medalist: 2016
  - Bronze Medalist: 2015
