= ARS Palma del Río =

Spanish handball team

- Full name: ARS Palma del Río
- Founded: 1973
- Arena: El Pandero, Palma del Río, Andalusia, Spain
- Capacity: 1,500
- President: (Spain) Eduardo Ruiz
- Head coach: (Spain) Víctor Montesinos
- League: División de Plata
- 2014–15: División de Plata, 9th
Home	Away

ARS Palma del Río is a handball team based in Palma del Río, Córdoba province, Andalusia. It was founded in 1973 within Salesians school of Palma del Río.

== Season by season ==
Season	Tier	Division	Pos.	Notes
1980–81	3	2ª Nacional		Promoted
1981–82	2	1ª Nacional	11th	
1982–83	2	1ª Nacional	5th	
1983–84	2	1ª Nacional	7th	
1984–85	2	1ª Nacional	11th	Relegated
1985–86	3	2ª Nacional		
1986–97	4	2ª Nacional		
1997–98	3	1ª Estatal	7th	
1998–99	3	1ª Estatal	10th	
1999–00	3	1ª Estatal	7th	
2000–01	3	1ª Estatal	4th	
2002–03	3	1ª Estatal	9th	
2001–02	3	1ª Estatal	9th	

Season	Tier	Division	Pos.	Notes
2003–04	3	1ª Estatal	3rd	
2004–05	3	1ª Estatal	3rd	
2005–06	3	1ª Estatal	2nd	Promoted
2006–07	2	Honor B	10th	
2007–08	2	Honor B	11th	
2008–09	2	Honor B	11th	
2009–10	2	Plata	5th	
2010–11	2	Plata	9th	
2011–12	2	Plata	2nd	Promoted
2012–13	1	ASOBAL	16th	Relegated
2013–14	2	Plata	15th / 1st	
2014–15	2	Plata	9th	
2015–16	2	Plata	3rd	

- 1 season in Liga ASOBAL
- 8 seasons in División de Plata

== Notable players ==
- (Spain) Rafael Baena
- (Bosnia and Herzegovina) Nikola Dokić

== Stadium information ==
- Name: - El Pandero
- City: - Palma del Río
- Capacity: - 1,500 seats
- Address: - Avenida Aulio Cornelio Palma, s/n
