= SD Octavio Vigo =

Spanish handball club

Academia Octavio
- Full name: Sociedad Deportiva Octavio Vigo
- Founded: 1966; 59 years ago
- Dissolved: 2019; 6 years ago
- Arena: As Travesas, Vigo, Galicia, Spain
- Capacity: 4,500
- President: (Spain) Javier Rodríguez
- Head coach: (Spain) Quique Domínguez
- League: División de Plata
- 2014–15: División de Plata, 8th
Home	Away

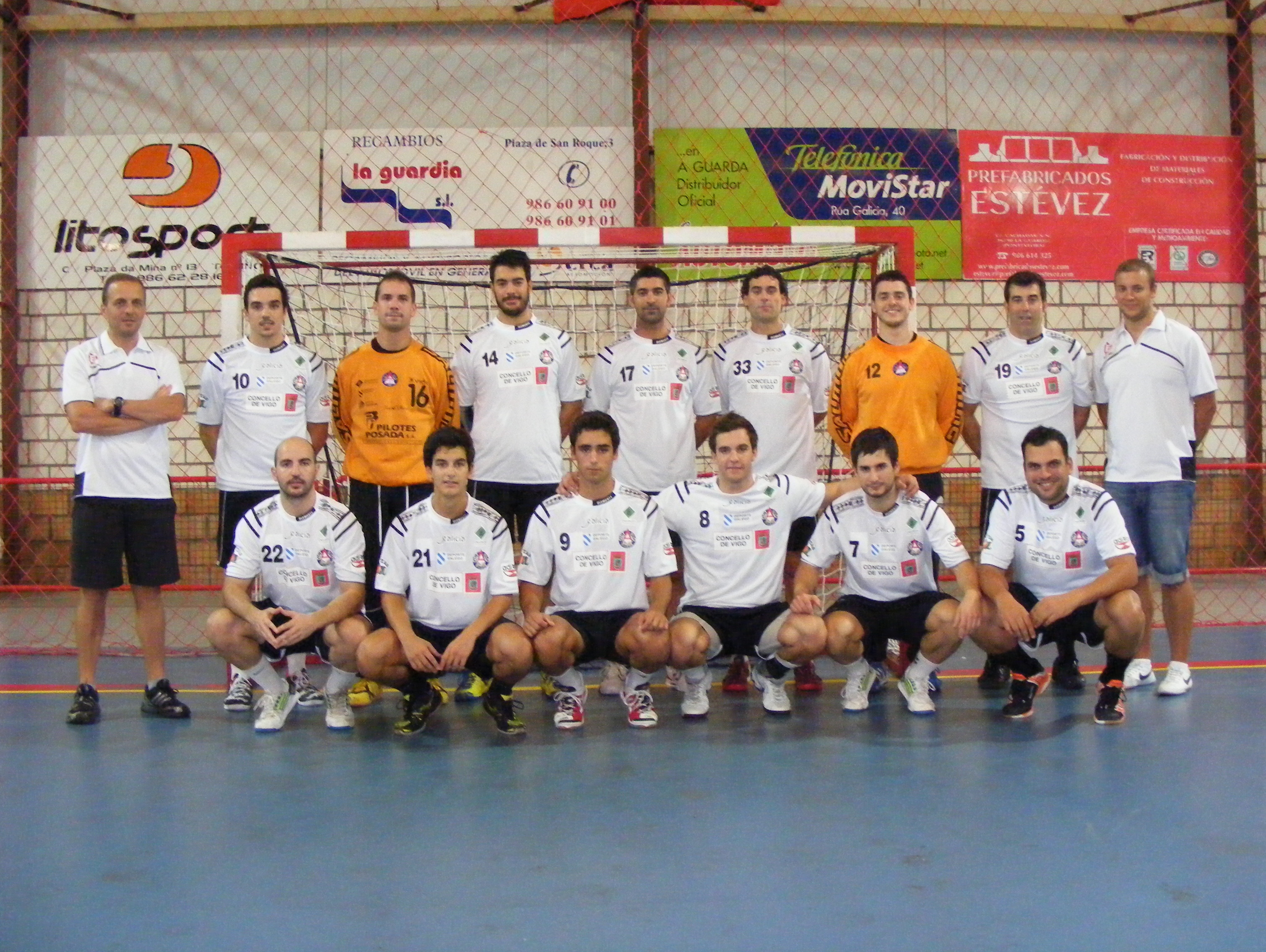
Octavio in the Trofeo Concello do Rosal 2013

Sociedad Deportiva Octavio Vigo was a Spanish handball club based in Vigo, Galicia. The team was disbanded in 2019 while playing in Primera Nacional, the third tier of Spanish handball. The team played in Liga ASOBAL until 2013 where they were relegated to the División de Plata.

They played in the Liga ASOBAL for the first time in 1993-94.

== Season by season ==
Season	Tier	Division	Pos.	Notes
1990–91	3	1ª Nacional "B"	8th (Group I)	Promoted
1991–92	2	1ª Nacional	10th (Group I)	
1992–93	2	1ª Nacional	2nd (Group I)	Promoted
1993–94	1	ASOBAL	8th (Group A)	
1994–95	1	ASOBAL	7th	
1995–96	1	ASOBAL	4th	
1996–97	1	ASOBAL	6th	
1997–98	1	ASOBAL	13th	Relegated
1998–99	2	Honor B	2nd (Group B)	
1999–00	2	Honor B	1st (Group A)	Promoted
2000–01	1	ASOBAL	11th	
2001–02	1	ASOBAL	15th	Relegated
2002–03	2	Honor B	1st	Promoted

Season	Tier	Division	Pos.	Notes
2003–04	1	ASOBAL	16th	Relegated
2004–05	2	Honor B	3rd	
2005–06	2	Honor B	4th	
2006–07	2	Honor B	1st	Promoted
2007–08	1	ASOBAL	11th	
2008–09	1	ASOBAL	9th	
2009–10	1	ASOBAL	15th	Relegated
2010–11	2	Plata	1st	Promoted
2011–12	1	ASOBAL	13th	
2012–13	1	ASOBAL	15th	Relegated
2013–14	2	Plata	9th	
2014–15	2	Plata	8th	
2015–16	2	Plata	16th	Relegated

- 13 seasons in Liga ASOBAL

== Notable players ==
- (Bosnia and Herzegovina) Nikola Prce
- (Croatia) Ivan Čupić
- (Bosnia and Herzegovina) Edhem Sirćo
- (Bosnia and Herzegovina) Darko Martinović
- (Spain) Xavier Pascual Fuertes

== Stadium information ==
- Name: - As Travesas
- City: - Vigo
- Capacity: - 4,500 people
- Address: - Avd. Castrelos, 1
