= 2007–08 División de Honor B de Balonmano =

The 2007–08 season of the División de Honor B de Balonmano is the 14th season of second-tier handball in Spain.

== Final standings ==
Pos	Team	Pld	W	D	L	GF	GA	GD	Pts	Promotion or relegation
1	BM Alcobendas	30	25	2	3	846	737	+109	52	Promoted
2	Edenca Ciudad Encantada	30	21	3	6	902	797	+105	45	Promoted
3	BM Barakaldo	30	18	6	6	844	798	+46	42	
4	Artepref Villa de Aranda	30	16	7	7	809	755	+54	39	
5	PRASA Pozoblanco	30	15	4	11	872	824	+48	34	
6	Helvetia Anaitasuna	30	14	4	12	875	880	−5	32	
7	Lábaro Toledo BM	30	13	5	12	835	825	+10	31	
8	Cangas Frigoríficos del Morrazo	30	12	6	12	786	787	−1	30	
9	Bidasoa Irún	30	11	6	13	778	786	−8	28	
10	Forcusa Huesca	30	12	4	14	805	805	0	28	
11	ARS Palma del Río	30	9	9	12	842	857	−15	27	
12	BM Almoradí Mahersol	30	10	6	14	794	792	+2	26	
13	Lacera Naranco	30	9	5	16	782	812	−30	23	
14	O.A.R. Coruña	30	7	6	17	831	906	−75	20	
15	Grupo Sigarci	30	5	5	20	800	892	−92	15	Relegated
16	Tolimar Tres de Mayo	30	3	2	25	832	980	−148	8	Relegated
