= Toledo BM =

Spanish handball club

Toledo
- Full name: Toledo Balonmano
- Founded: 2001
- Dissolved: 2012
- Arena: Javier Lozano Cid, Toledo, Castile-La Mancha, Spain
- Capacity: 2,500
- 2011–12: División de Plata, W
Home	Away

Toledo Balonmano was a handball club based in Toledo, Castile-La Mancha. Toledo Balonmano was founded in 2001 and played in División de Plata until January 2012 when was disbanded.

== Season by season ==
Season	Tier	Division	Pos.	Notes
2007–08	2	Honor B	7th	
2008–09	2	Honor B	1st	Promoted
2009–10	1	ASOBAL	14th	
2010–11	1	ASOBAL	15th	Relegated
2011–12	2	Plata	W	Disbanded

== Current squad 2010–11 ==
Note: Flags indicate national team as defined under FIFA eligibility rules; some limited exceptions apply. Players may hold more than one non-FIFA nationality.

No.	Pos.	Nation	Player
1		SRB	Dragan Marjanac
2		ESP	Sergio Requejo
3		ESP	Víctor Pascual
4		ESP	Enrique Plaza
5		ESP	Francisco Vidal
6		SWE	Daniel Baverud
7		LTU	Tomas Eitutis
9		ESP	Jorge Casado
10		LTU	Augustas Strazdas
11		ESP	Guillermo Barbón

No.	Pos.	Nation	Player
12		ESP	Fermín Ballesteros
14		LTU	Andrius Stelmokas
16		ESP	Mario Aguado
17		ESP	Javier Fernández
19		DEN	Daniel Svensson
20		ESP	Pedro Fuentes
22		SRB	Milan Ivanović
23		ESP	Ángel Pérez

== Statistics 2010/11 ==
Liga ASOBAL	Position	Pts	P	W	D	L	F	A
Toledo	15th	11	30	4	3	23	799	945

== Stadium information ==
- Name: - Pabellón Municipal "Javier Lozano Cid" – inaugural year (1982)
- City: - Toledo
- Capacity: - 2.500 people
- Address: - Carretera de Mocejón, s/n.
