= 2011–12 División de Plata de Balonmano =

División de Plata
- Season: 2011–12
- Champions: FC Barcelona B
- Relegated: Pozoblanco & Mecalia Novás
- Matches: 168
- Goals: 11,732 (69.83 per match)
- Top goalscorer: Adrián Figueras, FC Barcelona B
- Biggest home win: FC Barcelona B 43–22 Escubal Badajoz
- Biggest away win: BM Alcobendas 22–34 FC Barcelona B
- Highest scoring: ARS PalmaNaranja 36–36 Bidasoa Irún

The 2011–12 season of the División de Plata de Balonmano was the 18th season of second-tier handball in Spain.

== Promotion and relegation ==
Once finished 2011–12 regular season.

Teams promoted to Liga ASOBAL 2012–13

- ARS PalmaNaranja – 1st at standings
- Frigoríficos del Morrazo – playoffs' winner
- CB Villa de Aranda – playoffs' finalist

Teams relegated to 2012–13 Primera Nacional

- Pozoblanco
- Mecalia Atl. Novás

Teams dissolved

- Toledo

== Teams ==
Location of teams in División de Plata 2011–12

Team	Location	Stadium	Capacity
FC Barcelona B	Barcelona	Palau Blaugrana	7,500
ARS PalmaNaranja	Palma del Río	El Pandero	1,500
Frigoríficos del Morrazo	Cangas do Morrazo	O Gatañal	3,000
Adelma Sinfín	Santander	La Albericia	4,000
Villa de Aranda	Aranda de Duero	Príncipe de Asturias	3,000
Gijón Jovellanos	Gijón	La Arena	2,500
Ángel Ximénez	Puente Genil	Alcalde Miguel Salas	600
Barakaldo	Barakaldo	Lasesarre	2,576
Alcobendas	Alcobendas	Los Sueños	1,000
Grupo Pinta Torrelavega	Torrelavega	Vicente Trueba	5,375
Teucro	Pontevedra	Pavillón Municipal	4,000
Bidasoa Irún	Irún	Artaleku	2,686
Escubal Badajoz	Badajoz	La Granadilla	5,000
Pozoblanco	Pozoblanco	Juan Sepúlveda	1,500
Mecalia Atl. Novás	O Rosal	Rosal	1,000
Toledo	Toledo	Javier Lozano	2,500

== Final standings ==
Pos	Team	Pld	W	D	L	GF	GA	GD	Pts	Promotion or relegation
1	FC Barcelona B (Note: FC Barcelona B not played promotion playoffs due to be a reserve team.)	28	25	1	2	885	729	+156	51	
2	ARS PalmaNaranja	28	19	3	6	877	745	+132	41	Promoted
3	Frigoríficos del Morrazo	28	16	5	7	789	69	+720	37	Promotion playoffs
4	Adelma Sinfín	28	16	4	8	807	775	+32	36	Promotion playoffs
5	Villa de Aranda	28	16	3	9	869	799	+70	35	Promotion playoffs
6	Gijón Jovellanos	28	14	5	9	730	723	+7	33	Promotion playoffs
7	Ángel Ximénez	28	15	1	12	763	732	+31	31	
8	Barakaldo	28	13	3	12	773	774	−1	29	
9	Alcobendas	28	8	6	14	779	816	−37	22	
10	Grupo Pinta Torrelavega	28	10	1	17	752	805	−53	21	
11	Teucro	28	9	2	17	753	818	−65	20	
12	Bidasoa Irún	28	8	4	16	758	778	−20	20	
13	Escubal Badajoz	28	9	0	19	736	809	−73	18	
14	Pozoblanco	28	6	2	20	729	842	−113	14	Relegated
15	Mecalia Novás	28	5	2	21	732	889	−157	12	Relegated
16	Toledo (Note: Toledo withdrew at mid-season. Later, the club was disbanded. All its records achieved were expunged.)	0	0	0	0	0	0	0	0	Relegated

== Playoffs for promotion ==
Winner of Final will be promoted to Liga ASOBAL for 2012–13 season.

- Host team: Frigoríficos del Morrazo
- City: Cangas do Morrazo, Pontevedra
- Venue: Pabellón Municipal O Gatañal
- Date: 26–27 May 2012

=== Bracket ===
Semi-finals
26 May - O Gatañal
Frigoríficos del Morrazo	21
Gijón Jovellanos	20
26 May - O Gatañal
Adelma Sinfín	22
Villa de Aranda	23

Final
27 May - O Gatañal
Frigoríficos del Morrazo	27
Villa de Aranda	25
Third place
27 May - O Gatañal
Gijón Jovellanos	24
Adelma Sinfín	25

Promoted to Liga ASOBAL

=== Semifinals ===
26 May 2012; 18:00	Frigorificos del Morrazo	21 – 20	Gijón Jovellanos	Pabellón Municipal O Gatañal, Cangas; Attendance: 2,500; Referees: Monjo Ortega, Hermoso del Amo
26 May 2012; 18:00	Rosales 5	Report	Ruesga 7	Pabellón Municipal O Gatañal, Cangas; Attendance: 2,500; Referees: Monjo Ortega, Hermoso del Amo
26 May 2012; 18:00	7× (suspension) 1× (red card)		6× (suspension)	Pabellón Municipal O Gatañal, Cangas; Attendance: 2,500; Referees: Monjo Ortega, Hermoso del Amo

26 May 2012; 20:00	Adelma Sinfín	22 – 23	Villa de Aranda	Pabellón Municipal O Gatañal, Cangas; Attendance: 900; Referees: Gallardo Cabello F, Gallardo Cabello S
26 May 2012; 20:00	Sanchagarre 11	Report	Bozalongo 6	Pabellón Municipal O Gatañal, Cangas; Attendance: 900; Referees: Gallardo Cabello F, Gallardo Cabello S
26 May 2012; 20:00	4× (suspension)		8× (suspension)	Pabellón Municipal O Gatañal, Cangas; Attendance: 900; Referees: Gallardo Cabello F, Gallardo Cabello S

=== Third place ===
27 May 2012; 10:30	Gijón Jovellanos	24 – 25	Adelma Sinfín	Pabellón Municipal O Gatañal, Cangas; Attendance: 2,000; Referees: Gallardo Cabello F, Gallardo Cabello S
27 May 2012; 10:30	Costoya 8	Report	Kavolius, Sanchagarre 5	Pabellón Municipal O Gatañal, Cangas; Attendance: 2,000; Referees: Gallardo Cabello F, Gallardo Cabello S
27 May 2012; 10:30	4× (suspension)		3× (suspension) 1× (red card)	Pabellón Municipal O Gatañal, Cangas; Attendance: 2,000; Referees: Gallardo Cabello F, Gallardo Cabello S

=== Final ===
27 May 2012; 12:30	Frigoríficos del Morrazo	27 – 25	Villa de Aranda	Pabellón Municipal O Gatañal, Cangas; Attendance: 3,000; Referees: Carlos Luque, Ignacio Pascual
27 May 2012; 12:30	David García 7	Report	Ros 6	Pabellón Municipal O Gatañal, Cangas; Attendance: 3,000; Referees: Carlos Luque, Ignacio Pascual
27 May 2012; 12:30	4× (suspension)		4× (suspension)	Pabellón Municipal O Gatañal, Cangas; Attendance: 3,000; Referees: Carlos Luque, Ignacio Pascual

== Top goal scorers ==
Player	Goals	Team
(Spain) Adrià Figueras	182	FC Barcelona B
(Spain) David Pellitero	174	Gijón Jovellanos
(Spain) José María Bozalongo	173	Villa de Aranda
(Spain) Asier Aramburu	162	Bidasoa Irún
(Spain) Alberto Muñoz	160	Barakaldo
(Spain) Jesús Soliño	160	Frigoríficos del Morrazo
(Spain) Ángel Fernández	150	Grupo Pinta Torrelavega
(Spain) Fernando Hernández	146	Escubal Badajoz
(Spain) Ángel Castaño	145	Alcobendas
(Spain) Alberto Salgado	145	Teucro
