= Fernando Hernández (handballer) =

Spanish handball player (born 1973)

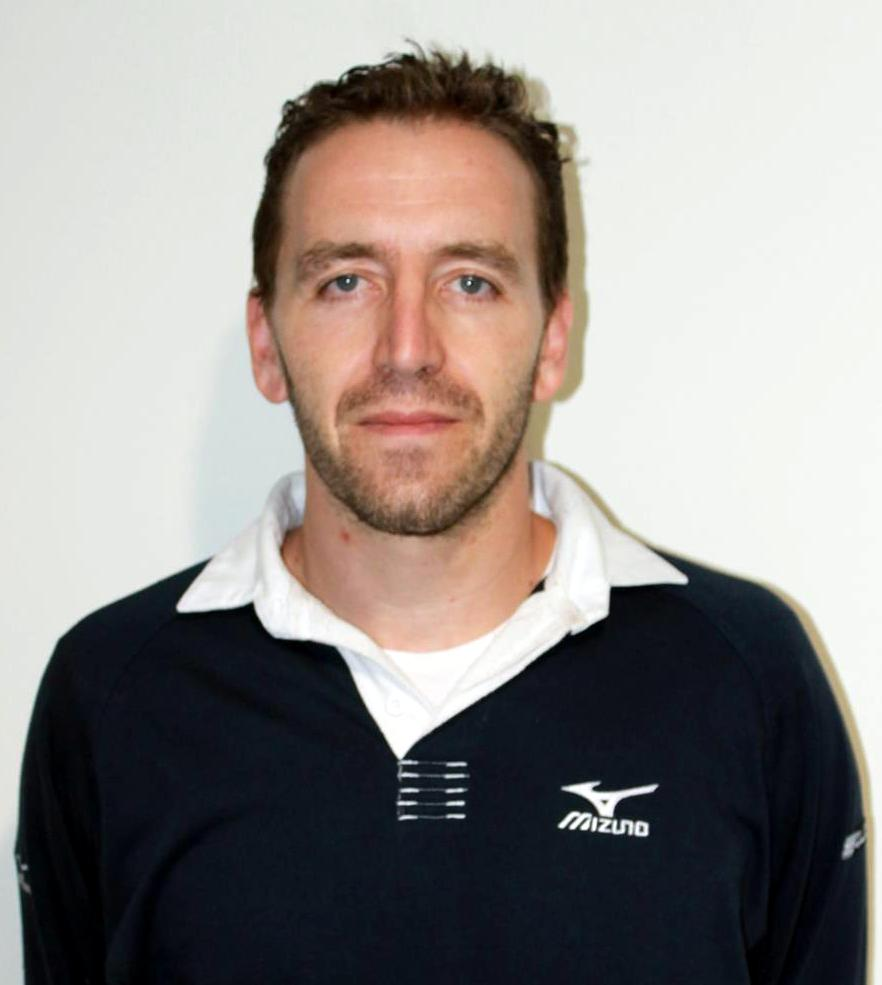
- Hernández in 2013

Personal information
- Full name: Fernando Hernández Casado
- Nationality: Spanish
- Born: 24 February 1973 (age 53) Valladolid, Spain
- Height: 1.85 m (6 ft 1 in)

Sport
- Sport: Handball
- Position: Right wing

Youth career
- Years: Team
- –: La Salle

Senior clubs
- Years: Team
- 1992-1996: BM Valladolid
- 1996-2000: Ademar León
- 2000-2007: FC Barcelona
- 2007-2010: Portland San Antonio
- 2010-2012: BM Badajoz
- 2012-2014: BM Valladolid
- 2006–2008: BM Atlético Valladolid
National team
Years	Team	Apps	(Gls)
–	Spain	120	(327)
Medal record
Men's handball
Representing Spain
Olympic Games
Bronze medal – third place	1996 Atlanta	Team
World Championship
Gold medal – first place	2005 Tunisia
European Championships
Silver medal – second place	1996 Spain
Mediterranean Games
Bronze medal – third place	1997 Bari	Team

Fernando Hernández Casado (Note: In this Spanish name, the first or paternal surname is Hernández and the second or maternal family name is Casado.) (born 24 February 1973) is a Spanish handball player who won 2005 World Men's Handball Championship. He also the competed in the 1996 Summer Olympics and in the 2004 Summer Olympics.

In 1996, he won the bronze medal with the Spanish team. He played one match and scored three goals.

Eight years later, he was a member of the Spanish handball team which finished seventh in the 2004 Olympic tournament. He played all eight matches and scored 15 goals.

== Career ==
Hernández started playing handball at the club La Salle in his hometown, Valladolid. Here, he won the Spanish youth championship in 1989.

In 1992, he made his senior debut for BM Valladolid in the top Spanish league, Liga ASOBAL. In 1996 he joined Ademar León, where he won the Copa ASOBAL and EHF Cup Winners' Cup in 2000. The following summer, he joined FC Barcelona. Here he won the Copa ASOBAL and Spanish Supercup, the 2002 Copa ASOBAL, the 2003 Spanish league and EHF European League, the 2004 Copa del Rey, Spanish Supercup and EHF Men's Champions Trophy, the 2005 EHF Champions League, the 2006 Spanish league and in his last season at the club in 2007 the Spanish Supercup. In 2007, the team did however only finish 4th in the league, which made the club leadership completely change the squad. So Hernández left, together with Albert Rocas, to SDC San Antonio.

In 2010, he joined BM Badajoz in the second tier, before returning to BM Valladolid. In 2014, the club was dissolved and recreated as BM Atlético Valladolid. He chose to stay and followed the club down to the second division under a new name.

With 617 league games, he has had the third most Liga ASOBAL appearances behind Juanín García (628) and José Javier Hombrados (767).
