= 2009–10 División de Plata de Balonmano =

Spanish handball

División de Plata
- Season: 2009–10
- Champions: Alser Puerto Sagunto
- Relegated: Pedro Alonso Niño, Ángel Ximénez & Cajasur Córdoba 2016
- Matches played: 240
- Goals scored: 13,905 (57.94 per match)

The 2009–10 season of the División de Honor B de Balonmano is the 16th season of second-tier handball in Spain.

== Final standings ==
Pos	Team	Pld	W	D	L	GF	GA	GD	Pts	Promotion or relegation
1	Alser Puerto Sagunto	30	23	0	7	923	777	+146	46	Promoted
2	Realitas Guadalajara	30	20	4	6	865	800	+65	44	Play-offs for promotion
3	Helvetia Anaitasuna	30	19	5	6	944	852	+92	43	Play-offs for promotion
4	PRASA Pozoblanco	30	20	2	8	915	816	+99	42	Play-offs for promotion
5	ARS Palma del Río	30	18	4	8	919	872	+47	40	Play-offs for promotion
6	Teucro	30	19	2	9	930	835	+95	40	
7	Obearagón Huesca	30	15	9	6	896	830	+66	39	
8	Barakaldo	30	13	3	14	850	871	−21	29	
9	Adelma Sinfín	30	11	3	16	892	905	−13	25	
10	Bidasoa Irún	30	10	5	15	866	900	−34	25	
11	Grupo Pinta Torrelavega	30	10	3	17	861	904	−43	23	
12	Artepref Villa de Aranda	30	10	3	17	854	913	−59	23	
13	Almoradí Mahersol	30	7	5	18	796	924	−128	19	
14	Pedro Alonso Niño	30	7	3	20	796	883	−87	17	Relegated
15	Ángel Ximénez	30	6	3	21	769	846	−77	15	Relegated
16	Cajasur Córdoba 2016	30	3	4	23	829	977	−148	10	Relegated

=== Playoffs for promotion ^{[usurped]} ===
==== Semifinals ====
29 May 2010; 18:00	Rayet Guadalajara	30 – 27	ARS Palma Naranja	Polideportivo San José, Guadalajara
29 May 2010; 18:00		Report		Polideportivo San José, Guadalajara

29 May 2010; 20:15	Helvetia Anaitasuna	33 – 34	PRASA Pozoblanco	Polideportivo San José, Guadalajara
29 May 2010; 20:15		Report		Polideportivo San José, Guadalajara

==== Final ====
30 May 2010; 12:30	Rayet Guadalajara	30 – 29	PRASA Pozoblanco	Polideportivo San José, Guadalajara
30 May 2010; 12:30		Report		Polideportivo San José, Guadalajara
