= 2008–09 División de Honor B de Balonmano =

The 2008–09 season of the División de Honor B de Balonmano is the 15th season of second-tier handball in Spain.

== Final standings ==
Pos	Team	Pld	W	D	L	GF	GA	GD	Pts	Promotion or relegation
1	Lábaro Toledo	28	19	3	6	783	708	+75	41	Promoted
2	Helvetia Anaitasuna	28	18	3	7	814	745	+69	39	Play-offs for promotion
3	PRASA Pozoblanco	28	17	5	6	790	721	+69	39	Play-offs for promotion
4	Realitas Guadalajara	28	17	1	10	795	754	+41	35	Play-offs for promotion
5	Frigoríficos del Morrazo	28	14	5	9	753	754	−1	33	Play-offs for promotion
6	Artepref Villa de Aranda	28	13	4	11	724	714	+10	30	
7	Almoradí Mahersol	28	14	2	12	743	761	−18	30	
8	Barakaldo	28	14	2	12	787	764	+23	30	
9	Bidasoa Irún	28	12	6	10	777	777	0	30	
10	Alser Puerto Sagunto	28	10	4	14	759	794	−35	24	
11	ARS Palma del Río	28	9	4	15	759	787	−28	22	
12	Hexa Aldemar	28	9	3	16	726	768	−42	21	
13	Obearagón Huesca	28	8	4	16	760	766	−6	20	
14	Adelma Sinfín	28	8	2	18	735	794	−59	18	
15	Atlético Boadilla Madrid	28	3	2	23	728	826	−98	8	Relegated

=== Playoffs for promotion ^{[usurped]} ===
==== Semifinals ====
23 May 2009	PRASA Pozoblanco	30 – 34	Rayet Guadalajara	(report)

23 May 2009	Helvetia Anaitasuna	23 – 30	Frigoríficos del Morrazo	(report)

==== Final ====
24 May 2009	Frigoríficos del Morrazo	25 – 21	Rayet Guadalajara	(report)
