= Pabellón Polideportivo Municipal Fernando Argüelles =

Arena in Antequera, Spain

Coordinates: 37.02253°N 4.56863°W

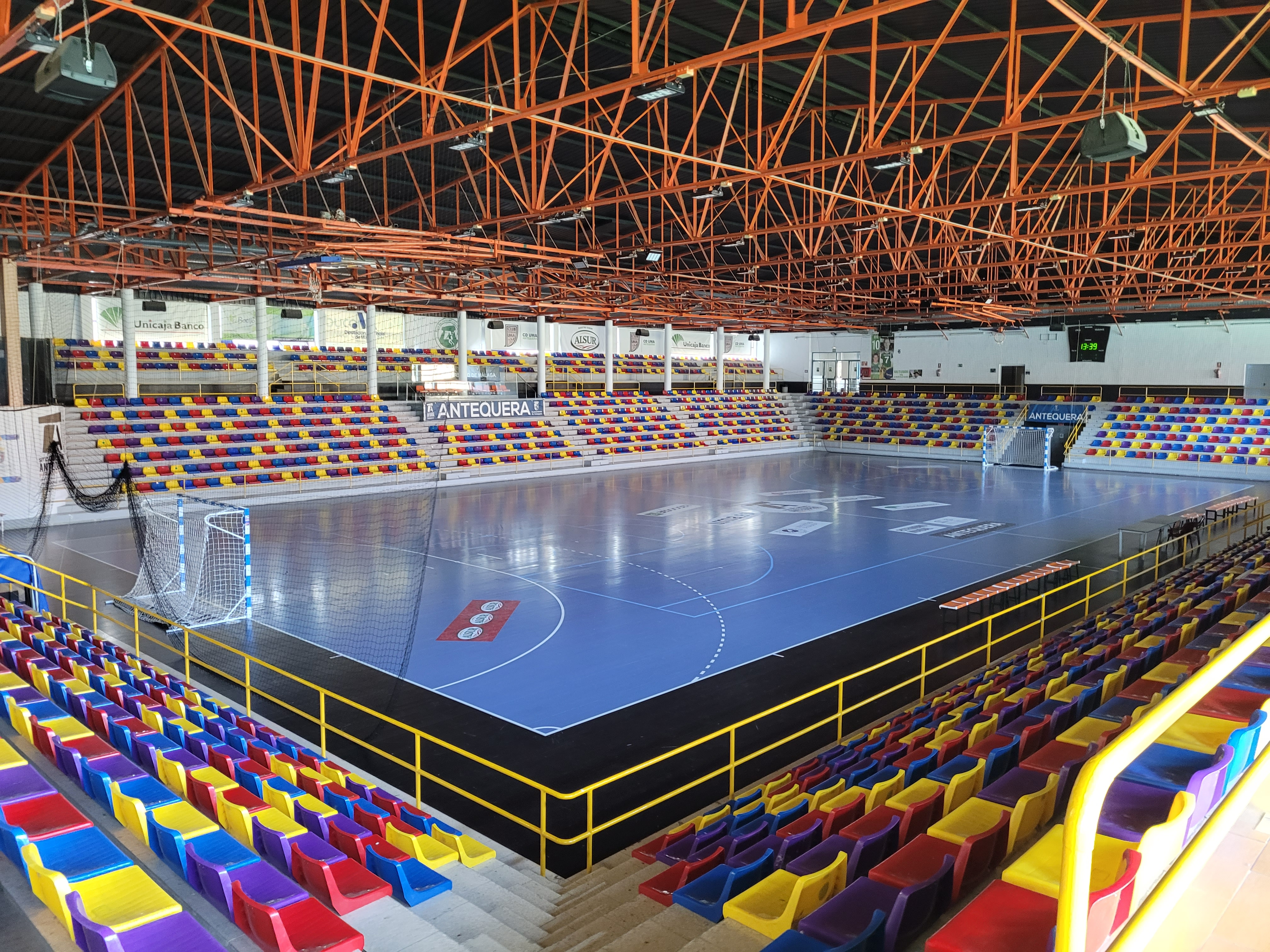
Fernando Argüelles Municipal Sports Pavilion in 2022

Pabellón Polideportivo Municipal Fernando Argüelles is an arena in Antequera, Spain. It is primarily used for team handball and is the home arena of BM Antequera. The arena holds 2,575 people.
