= División de Plata de Balonmano =

División de Plata
- Founded: 1994; 32 years ago
- No. of teams: 16
- Country: Spain
- Confederation: EHF
- Most recent champion: Club Balonmano Eón Alicante (2024–25)
- Level on pyramid: 2
- Promotion to: Liga ASOBAL
- Relegation to: Primera Nacional
- Website: http://www.rfebm.net/
- 2025–26 season

División de Plata de Balonmano, is the second level handball league in Spain. It was founded in 1994 and is managed by RFEBM. From 1994 until 2008–09 season, this competition was known as División de Honor B. From 2009–10 season onwards, it's officially known as División de Plata.

The División de Plata, which is played under EHF rules, currently consists of 16 teams, including ones like Academia Octavio, Calmec Barakaldo, Alcobendas, and Pozoblanco.

== Competition rules ==
The championship consist of 16 teams playing each other twice for a total of 30 matchdays. At end of regular season, the top team in the standings is promoted to Liga ASOBAL. Teams in 2nd, 3rd, 4th and 5th place play the promotion playoff for a single spot in Liga ASOBAL. Bottom three teams are relegated to Primera División Estatal.

Points during regular season are awarded as following;

Each victory adds 2 points to the winner team.

Each drawn adds 1 point to each team.

== 2015–16 season teams ==
Location of teams in División de Plata 2015–16

Team	Location	Stadium	Capacity
MMT Seguros Zamora	Zamora	Ángel Nieto	1,200
Juanfersa Comunicalia	Gijón	Palacio de Deportes	5,197
FC Barcelona B Lassa	Barcelona	Palau Blaugrana	7,500
Atlético Valladolid	Valladolid	Huerta del Rey	3,500
Bidasoa Irun	Irun	Polideportivo Artaleku	2,200
Viveros Herol Nava	Nava de la Asunción	Polideportivo Municipal	700
Alcobendas	Alcobendas	Los Sueños	1,000
Academia Octavio	Vigo	As Travesas	4,500
Zumosol ARS Palma del Río	Palma del Río	El Pandero	1,500
Bordils	Bordils	Pavelló Blanc i Verd	500
La Roca	La Roca del Vallès	Pavelló Nou	1,000
Meridiano Antequera	Antequera	Fernando Argüelles	2,575
Amenabar Zarautz	Zarautz	Polideportivo Municipal	3,000
Cisne	Pontevedra	CGTD de Pontevedra	300
Alarcos Ciudad Real	Ciudad Real	Quijote Arena	5,863
R.G.C. Covadonga	Gijón	Braulio García	1,331

== 2014–15 regular season standings ==
Pos	Team	Pld	W	D	L	GF	GA	GD	Pts	Qualification or relegation
1	Teucro	30	24	2	4	957	830	+127	50	Promotion to Liga ASOBAL
2	Go Fit	30	21	3	6	912	800	+112	45	Qualified to promotion playoff
3	FC Barcelona B	30	21	2	7	916	823	+93	44	
4	Atlético Valladolid	30	19	6	5	859	772	+87	44	Qualified to promotion playoff
5	Bidasoa Irun	30	19	2	9	849	780	+69	40	Qualified to promotion playoff
6	Viveros Herol Nava	30	17	3	10	804	776	+28	37	Qualified to promotion playoff
7	UCAM Alcobendas	30	15	6	9	818	788	+30	36	
8	Academia Octavio	30	13	2	15	860	893	−33	28	
9	Zumosol ARS Palma del Río	30	11	4	15	835	819	+16	26	
10	Bordils	30	11	3	16	837	884	−47	25	
11	La Roca	30	8	5	17	820	887	−67	21	
12	Meridiano Antequera	30	9	3	18	817	858	−41	21	
13	Amenabar Zarautz	30	8	3	19	819	882	−63	19	
14	Torrelavega	30	8	2	20	784	853	−69	18	Relegation to Primera División
15	Automobica Barakaldo	30	7	3	20	790	870	−80	17	Relegation to Primera División
16	Interstar Deporte Algemesí	30	3	3	24	777	939	−162	9	Relegation to Primera División

Updated to match(es) played on 17 May 2015. Source: División de Plata and rfebm.net
Rules for classification: 1) points; 2) head-to-head points; 3) head-to-head goal difference; 4) goal difference; 5) number of goals scored

== Teams promoted by year ==
Season	Teams promoted
1990	Puerto Cruz & Tenerife 3 de Mayo
1991	Guadalajara & Sdad. Conquense
1992	Ceset Naranco & Caserío Vigón
1993	Guadalajara & Pilotes Posada
1994	Ademar León & Cesurca Huétor Tájar
1995	Caja Bilbao UPV Barakaldo & Ariston San Antonio
1996	Pescanova Chapela & PRASA Pozoblanco
1997	Universidad de Oviedo-Naranco
1998	Barakaldo-UPV
1999	Valencia Airtel & Stadium Casablanca
2000	Altea & Pilotes Posada
2001	Barakaldo-UPV, Teucro Caixanova & Almería 2005
2002	Canal Alcobendas & Torrevieja
2003	Octavio Pilotes Posada & Arrate
2004	Alcobendas Toyota & Torrevieja
2005	Algeciras & CAI Aragón
2006	Antequera & Darien Logroño
2007	Pilotes Posada and Teucro

Season	Teams promoted
2008	Alcobendas and Edenca Ciudad Encantada
2009	Lábaro Toledo and Frigoríficos Morrazo
2010	Alser Puerto Sagunto and Realitas Guadalajara
2011	Octavio, BM Huesca and Anaitasuna
2012	Palma del Río, BM Cangas and Villa de Aranda
2013	Juanfersa Gijón, Ángel Ximénez and Bidasoa Irun
2014	MMT Seguros Zamora and Servigroup Benidorm
2015	SD Teucro and BM Sinfín
2016	BM Atlético Valladolid and Bidasoa Irun
2017	SD Teucro and BM Zamora
2018	BM Alcobendas and BM Sinfín
2019	BM Nava and CB Puerto Sagunto
2020	Club Cisne and CB Villa de Aranda
2021	BM Torrelavega and Los Dólmenes Antequera
2022	BM Guadalajara and BM Cisne
2023	BM Puerto Sagunto and BM Nava
2024	BM Guadalajara and BM Villa de Aranda
2025	BM Eón Alicante and BM Caserío Ciudad Real
