= Palacio de los Deportes de La Rioja =

Arena in Logroño, Spain

Coordinates: 42°27′11.28″N 2°27′21.45″W

Palacio de los Deportes
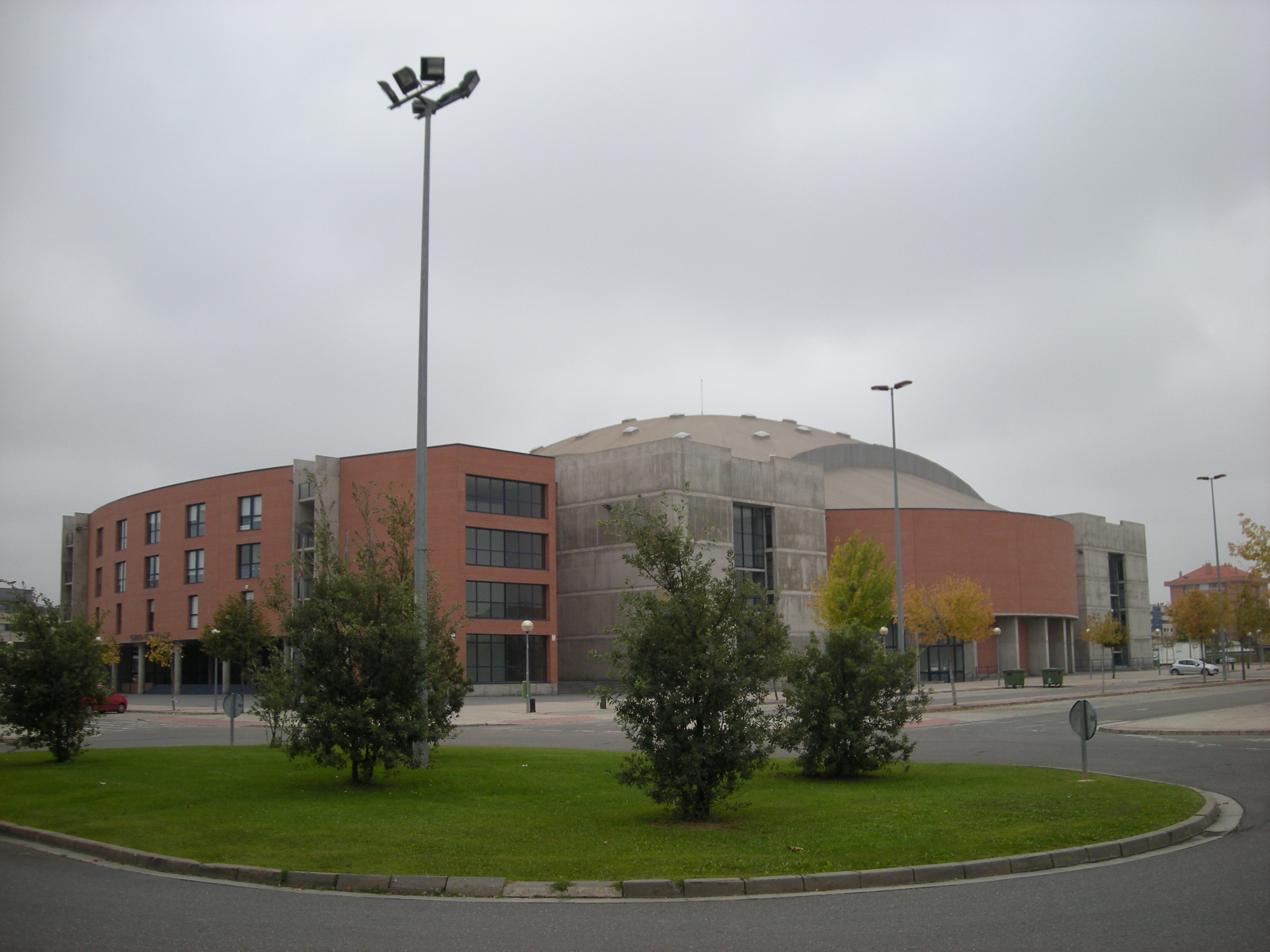
- Interactive map of Palacio de los Deportes
- Full name: Palacio de los Deportes de La Rioja
- Owner: Logroño City Hall
- Capacity: 4,500
- Surface: Parquet Floor

Construction
- Opened: 2003

Tenants
- CB Ciudad de Logroño; CB Clavijo

Palacio de los Deportes de La Rioja is an arena in Logroño, Spain. The arena holds 3,809 people, expandable to 4,500 people with additional seats.

It is primarily used for handball and basketball. This is the home arena of CB Ciudad de Logroño and CB Clavijo.

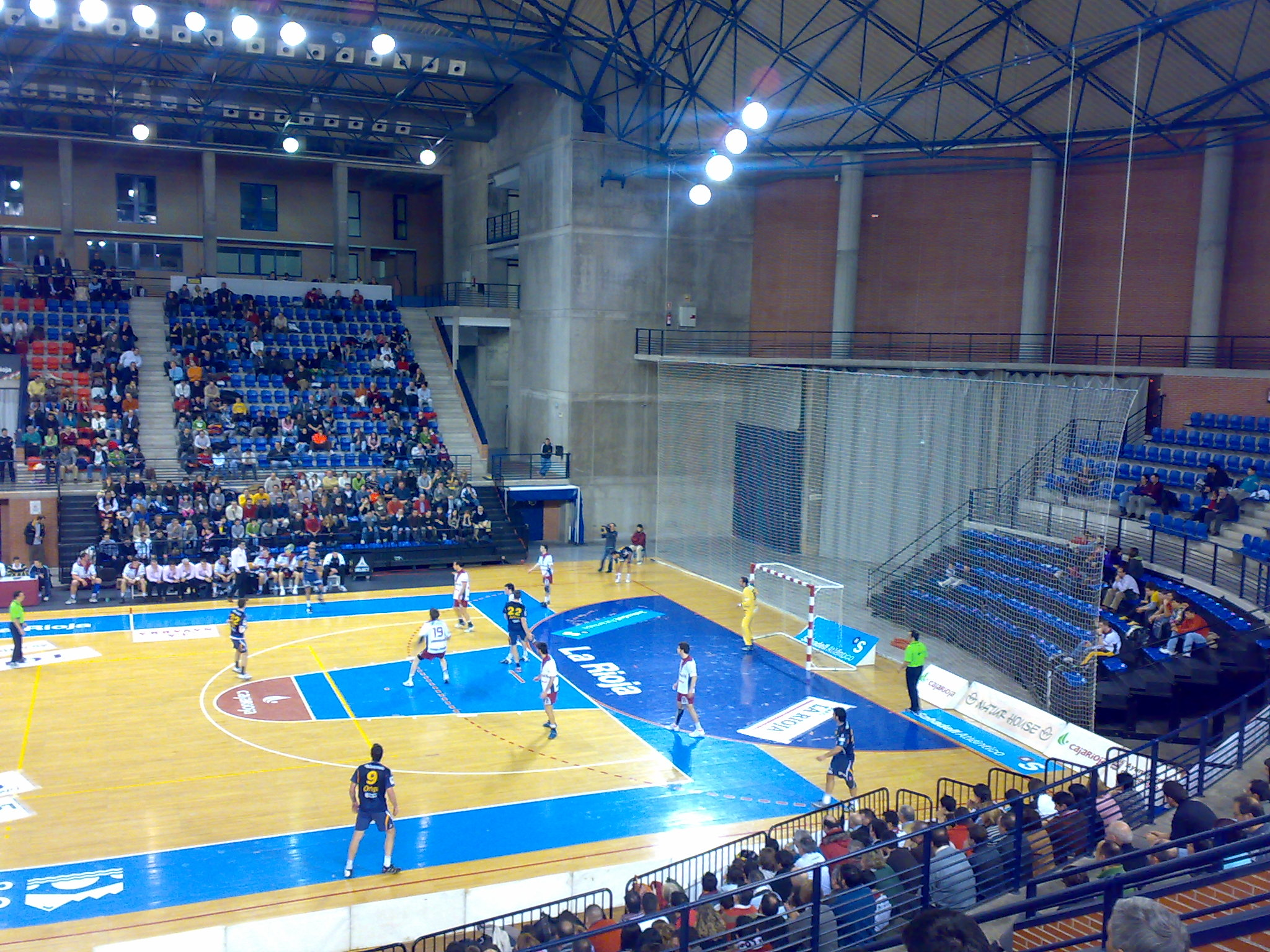
A handball game in the arena.
