= Palau d'Esports de Granollers =

Sport arena in Granollers, Spain

Coordinates: 41°35′55″N 2°17′16″E

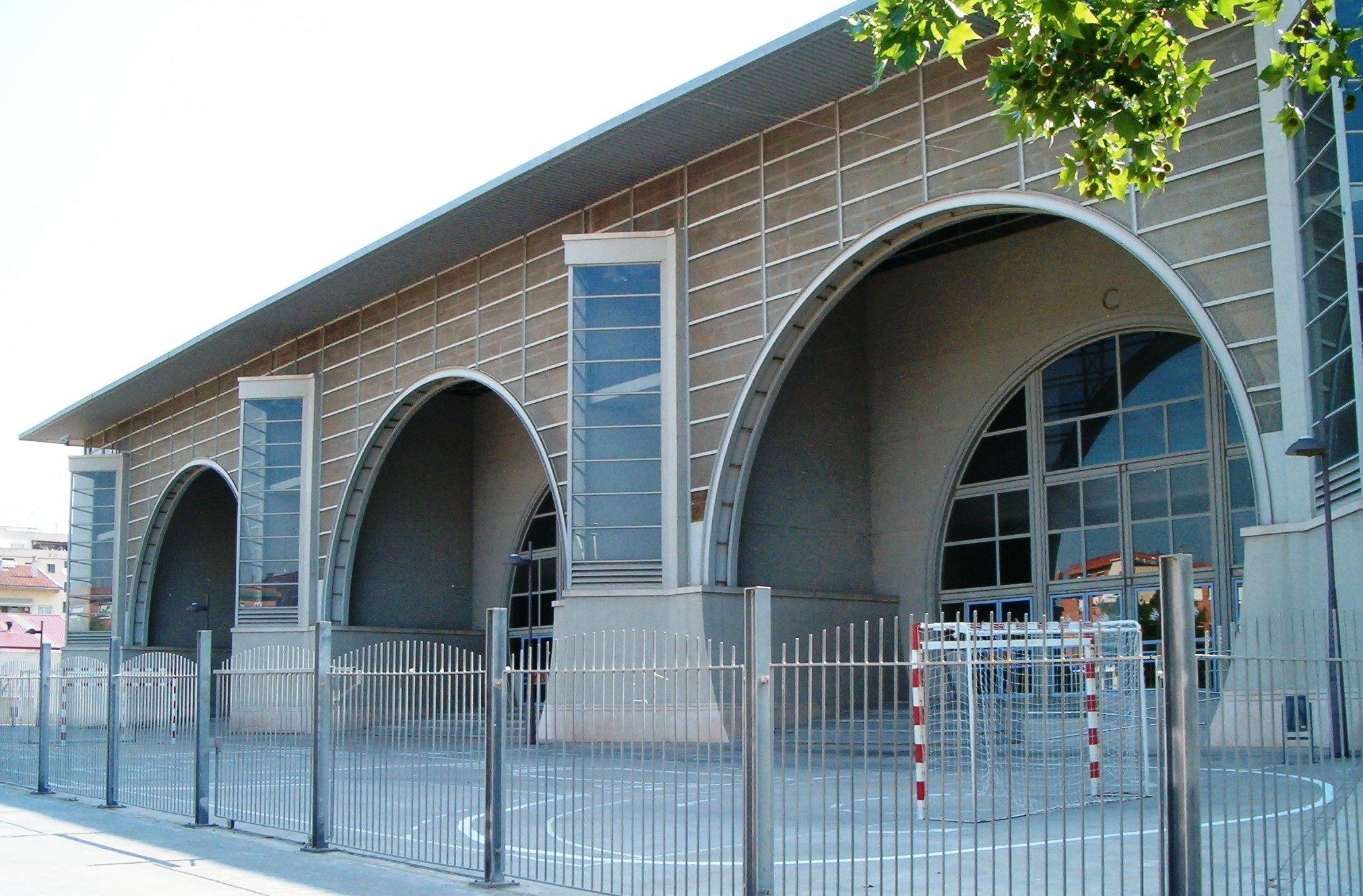
- Interactive map of Palau d'Esports de Granollers
- Location: Granollers, Catalonia, Spain
- Capacity: 5,685

Construction
- Opened: 1991
- Architect: Pep Bonet

Tenant
- BM Granollers

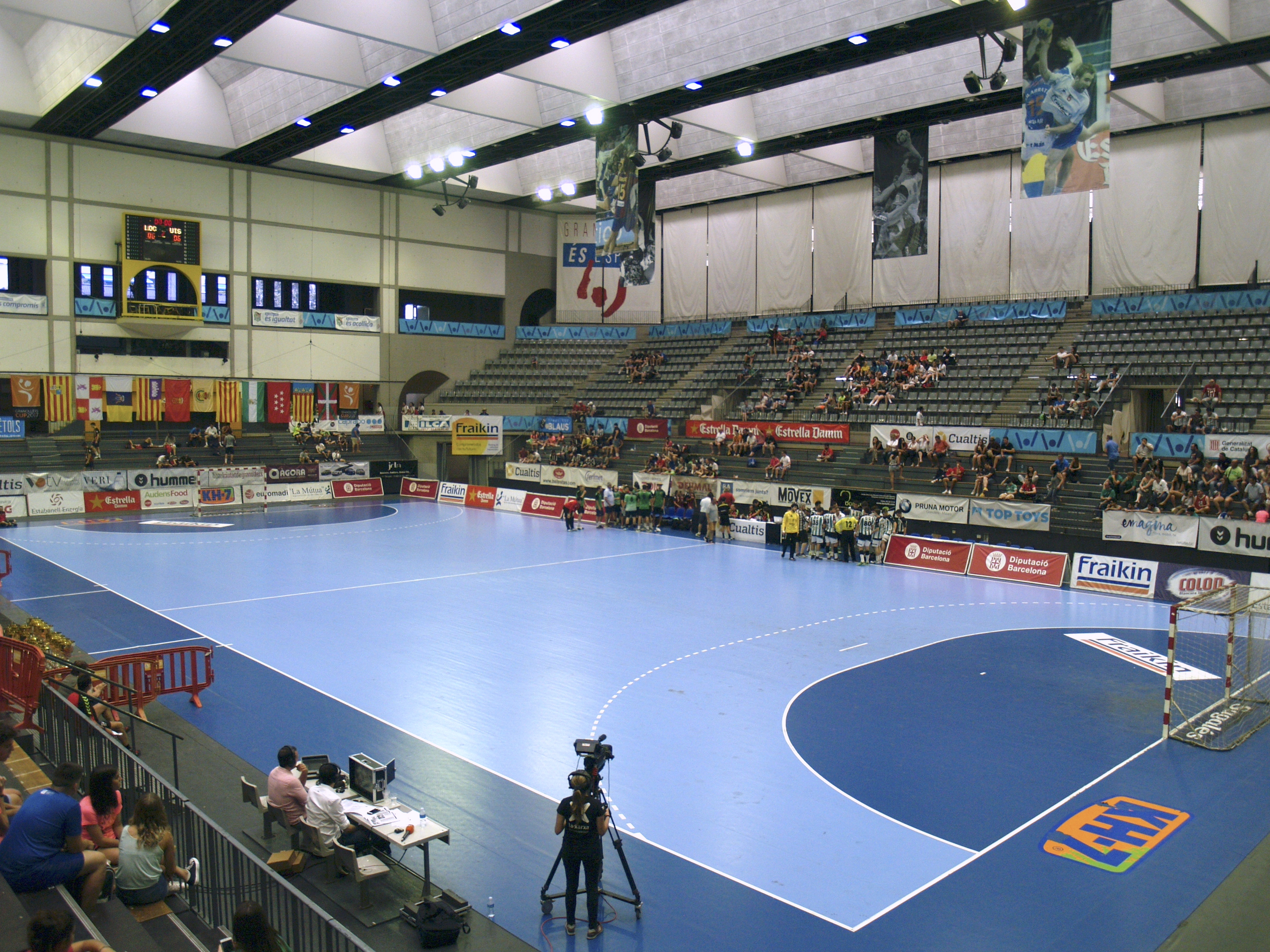
Interior of the arena.

Palau d'Esports de Granollers (Spanish: Palacio de Deportes de Granollers, English: Granollers Sports Palace) is an arena in Granollers, Catalonia. It is primarily used for team handball and is the home arena of BM Granollers. The arena, projected by the Catalan architect Pep Bonet, holds 5,685 people and was opened in 1991 for the 1992 Summer Olympics. During those games, it hosted the handball competitions. It is managed by the city of Granollers.
