= Palacio Multiusos de Guadalajara =

Multi-purpose venue in Guadalajara, Jalisco, Mexico

Coordinates: 40°38′19″N 3°09′56″W

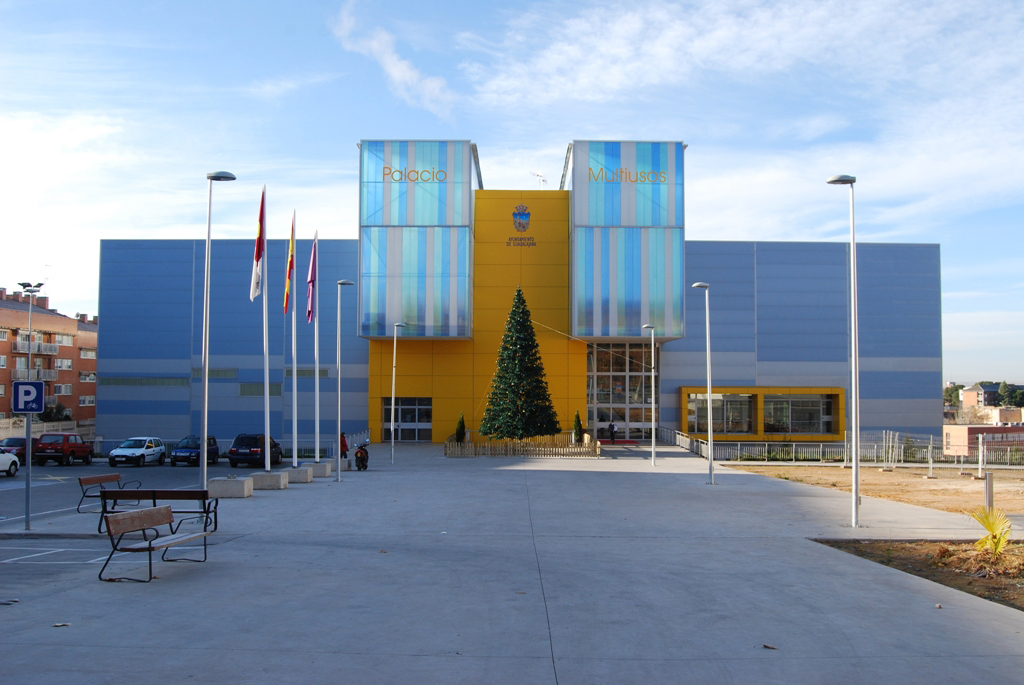
- Interactive map of Palacio Multiusos de Guadalajara
- Location: Guadalajara, Spain
- Capacity: 5,894

Construction
- Opened: 8 July 2010

Tenant
- BM Guadalajara (2010–present)

Palacio Multiusos de Guadalajara, also known as Polideportivo de Aguas Vivas, is an arena in Guadalajara, Spain. It is primarily used for basketball, volleyball, handball and futsal. The capacity of the arena is 5,894 people. It was a venue for the 2013 World Men's Handball Championship.
