= Zamalek SC (handball) in the IHF Super Globe =

Zamalek SC in the IHF Super Globe
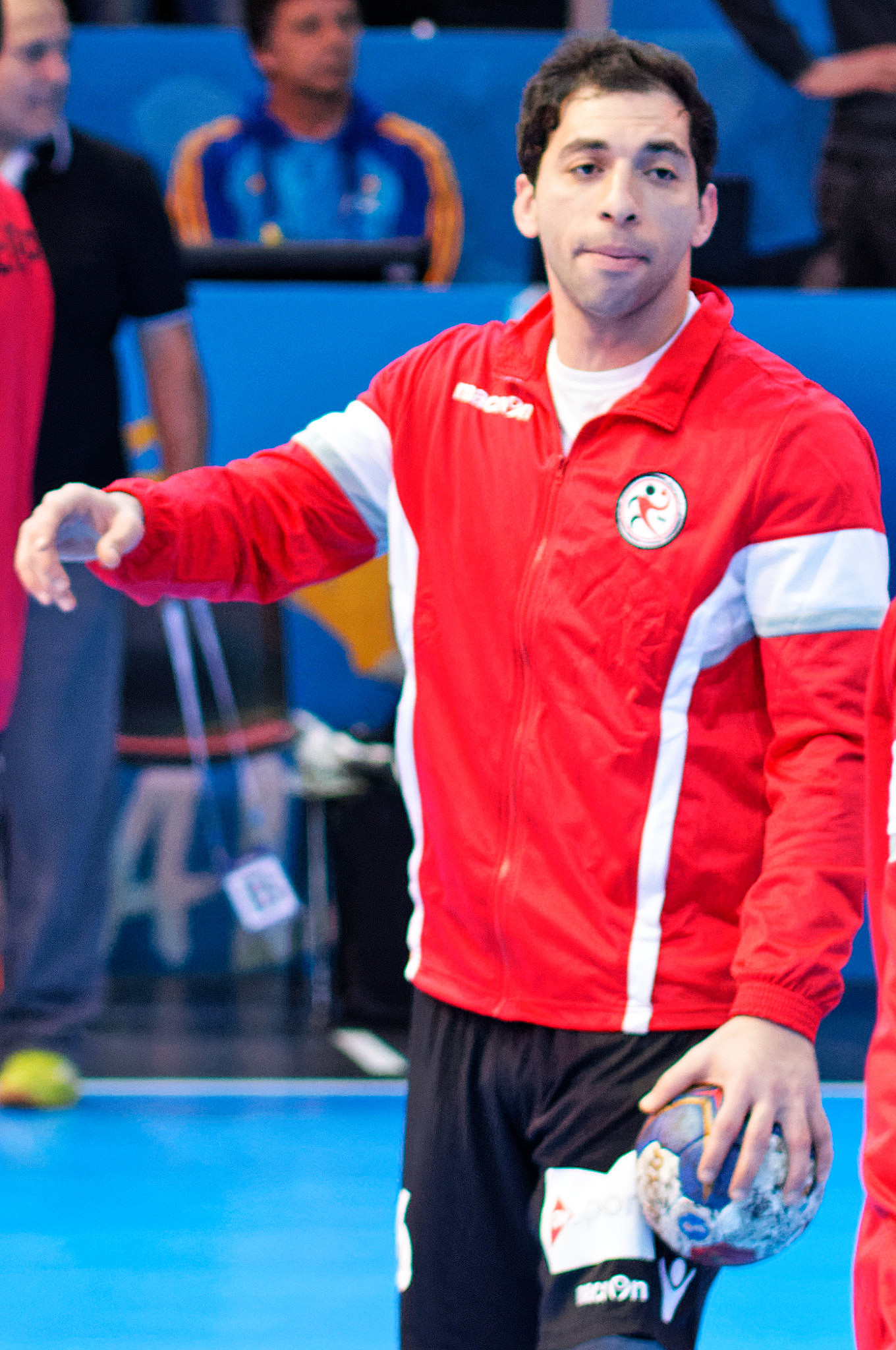
- Ahmed El-Ahmar, Zamalek’s top scorer in the IHF Super Globe with 133 goals, tournament all-time top scorer with 202 goals.
- Club: Zamalek SC
- Most appearances: Ahmed El-Ahmar (19)
- Top scorer: Ahmed El-Ahmar (133)
- First entry: 2010 IHF Super Globe
- Latest entry: 2021 IHF Super Globe

Zamalek Sporting Club is an Egyptian handball club based in Cairo. Zamalek qualified to the IHF Super Globe, the most prestigious handball club tournament of the International Handball Federation (IHF), 6 times, but withdrew 1 time (in 2018) and participated 5 times (in 2010, 2011, 2012, 2019, 2021), with these 5 participations, Zamalek is the most participating African team in the IHF Super Globe, and the 5th most participating team in the history of the tournament. As with all African clubs, the club qualifies through winning the African Handball Champions League (won a record 12 titles), or the African Handball Super Cup (won 7 titles). Zamalek had their best achievement in the IHF Super Globe when they won a bronze medal in 2010 (1st participation). In their 5 participations, Zamalek has never placed lower than 5th place (4th place twice and 5th place twice).

== Summary ==
- Qualified to the IHF Super Globe 6 times.
- Participated in the competition 5 times (2010, 2011, 2012, 2019, 2021).
- Withdrew from the competition 1 time (2018); because of a diplomatic crisis between Egypt and Qatar (host).

Rank	(Qatar) 2010	(Qatar) 2011	(Qatar) 2012	(Saudi Arabia) 2019	(Saudi Arabia) 2021
1					
2					
3	(Egypt) ZSC				
4		(Egypt) ZSC	(Egypt) ZSC		
5				(Egypt) ZSC	(Egypt) ZSC
6					
7					
8					
9					
10					
Total	1	2	3	4	5

== 2010 IHF Super Globe ==
This competition began with a groups format, and 6 teams took part, divided into two groups of three with the top two teams in each group qualifying for the semi-final.

=== Group stage ===
Group A

Team	Pld	W	D	L	GF	GA	GD	Pts
(Spain) Ciudad Real	2	2	0	0	68	41	+27	4
(Egypt) Zamalek	2	1	0	1	53	57	−4	2
(Brazil) Unopar	2	0	0	2	48	71	−23	0

Source: Goalzz

17 May 2010; 16:45	Ciudad Real (Spain)	28 – 22	(Egypt) Zamalek	Aspire Dome, Doha; Attendance: 1,500; Referees: Lazzar, Reveret (France)
17 May 2010; 16:45	Petar Metličić 5	(17 – 13)	Ahmed El-Ahmar 10	Aspire Dome, Doha; Attendance: 1,500; Referees: Lazzar, Reveret (France)
17 May 2010; 16:45	3× (yellow card) 2× (suspension) 0× (red card)	Report	3× (yellow card) 4× (suspension) 0× (red card)	Aspire Dome, Doha; Attendance: 1,500; Referees: Lazzar, Reveret (France)

19 May 2010; 16:45	Zamalek (Egypt)	31 – 29	(Brazil) Unopar	Al-Gharafa Sports Club Hall, Doha; Attendance: 1,200; Referees: Karbas Chi, Elsayed (Iran)
19 May 2010; 16:45	Ahmed El-Ahmar 10	(15 – 15)	Renato Mazzoco, Leonardo Bortolini 7	Al-Gharafa Sports Club Hall, Doha; Attendance: 1,200; Referees: Karbas Chi, Elsayed (Iran)
19 May 2010; 16:45	3× (yellow card) 3× (suspension) 0× (red card)	Report	3× (yellow card) 3× (suspension) 0× (red card)	Al-Gharafa Sports Club Hall, Doha; Attendance: 1,200; Referees: Karbas Chi, Elsayed (Iran)

=== Semifinal ===
May 20, 2010; 18:45	Al Sadd (Qatar)	27 – 23	(Egypt) Zamalek	Aspire Dome, Doha; Attendance: 2,500; Referees: Lazzar, Reveret (France)
May 20, 2010; 18:45	Kiril Lazarov 12	(13 – 12)	Ahmed El-Ahmar 8	Aspire Dome, Doha; Attendance: 2,500; Referees: Lazzar, Reveret (France)
May 20, 2010; 18:45	3× (yellow card) 7× (suspension) 0× (red card)	Report	3× (yellow card) 5× (suspension) 0× (red card)	Aspire Dome, Doha; Attendance: 2,500; Referees: Lazzar, Reveret (France)

=== Bronze Medal ===
May 21, 2010; 17:15	As-Sadd (Lebanon)	22 – 33	(Egypt) Zamalek	Aspire Dome, Doha; Attendance: 1,800; Referees: Karbas Chi, Elsayed (Iran)
May 21, 2010; 17:15	Petar Kapisoda 6	(8 – 12)	Ahmed El-Ahmar 13	Aspire Dome, Doha; Attendance: 1,800; Referees: Karbas Chi, Elsayed (Iran)
May 21, 2010; 17:15	3× (yellow card) 6× (suspension) 0× (red card)	Report	3× (yellow card) 5× (suspension) 0× (red card)	Aspire Dome, Doha; Attendance: 1,800; Referees: Karbas Chi, Elsayed (Iran)

=== Final ranking ===
1st place, gold medalist(s)	(Spain) BM Ciudad Real
2nd place, silver medalist(s)	(Qatar) Al Sadd
3rd place, bronze medalist(s)	(Egypt) Zamalek
4	(Lebanon) As-Sadd
5	(Brazil) Unopar
6	(Australia) Southern Stars

=== Top Scorers ===
Rank	Player	Games	Assists	Goals
1	Ahmed El-Ahmar (Note: Also, the 2010 IHF Super Globe top scorer (41 goals in 4 games).)	4	11	41
2	Hassan Yousry	4	5	16
3	Mohamed Sanad	4	—	12

== 2011 IHF Super Globe ==
This competition began with a groups format, and 8 teams took part, divided into two groups of four with the top team in each group qualifying for the final.

=== Group stage ===
Group B

Team	Pld	W	D	L	GF	GA	GD	Pts
(Spain) Ciudad Real	3	3	0	0	111	70	+41	6
(Egypt) Zamalek	3	1	1	1	103	93	+10	3
(Qatar) Al Sadd	3	1	1	1	104	97	+7	3
(Australia) Southern Stars HC	3	0	0	3	67	125	−58	0

Source: Goalzz

14 May 2011; 13:30	Ciudad Real (Spain)	33–25	(Egypt) Zamalek	Al-Gharafa Sports Club Hall
14 May 2011; 13:30	Kiril Lazarov 4	(18 – 10)	Ahmed El-Ahmar 4	Al-Gharafa Sports Club Hall
14 May 2011; 13:30	3× (yellow card) 4× (suspension) 0× (red card)	Report	2× (yellow card) 3× (suspension) 0× (red card)	Al-Gharafa Sports Club Hall

15 May 2011; 18:00	Zamalek (Egypt)	37–37	(Qatar) Al Sadd	Al-Gharafa Sports Club Hall
15 May 2011; 18:00	Ahmed El-Ahmar 10	(17 – 15)	Marko Vujin 13	Al-Gharafa Sports Club Hall
15 May 2011; 18:00	3× (yellow card) 7× (suspension) 0× (red card)	Report	3× (yellow card) 6× (suspension) 0× (red card)	Al-Gharafa Sports Club Hall

16 May 2011; 16:00	Zamalek (Egypt)	41–23	(Australia) Southern Stars HC	Al-Gharafa Sports Club Hall
16 May 2011; 16:00	Ahmed El-Ahmar 15	(22 – 11)	Kenneth Toerlen 6	Al-Gharafa Sports Club Hall
16 May 2011; 16:00	3× (yellow card) 3× (suspension) 0× (red card)	Report	2× (yellow card) 6× (suspension) 0× (red card)	Al-Gharafa Sports Club Hall

=== Third place game ===
18 May 2011; 17:00	Zamalek (Egypt)	23–28	(Lebanon) As-Sadd	Al-Gharafa Sports Club Hall
18 May 2011; 17:00	Ahmed El-Ahmar 8	(10–13)	Marko Krivokapić 7	Al-Gharafa Sports Club Hall
18 May 2011; 17:00	1× (yellow card) 2× (suspension) 0× (red card)	Report	0× (yellow card) 6× (suspension) 0× (red card)	Al-Gharafa Sports Club Hall

=== Final ranking ===
1st place, gold medalist(s)	(Germany) THW Kiel
2nd place, silver medalist(s)	(Spain) BM Ciudad Real
3rd place, bronze medalist(s)	(Lebanon) As-Sadd
4	(Egypt) Zamalek
5	(Brazil) EC Pinheiros
6	(Qatar) Al Sadd
7	(Qatar) Al Rayyan
8	(Australia) Southern Stars

=== Top Scorers ===
Rank	Player	Games	Assists	Goals
1	Ahmed El-Ahmar (Note: Also, the 2011 IHF Super Globe top scorer (37 goals in 4 games).)	4	3	37
2	Mohamed "Risha" Abd El-Salam	4	6	20
3	Mamdouh Hashem	4	1	18

== 2012 IHF Super Globe ==
This competition began with a groups format, and 8 teams took part, divided into two groups of four with the top two teams in each group qualifying for the semi-final.

=== Group stage ===
Group A

Team	Pld	W	D	L	GF	GA	GD	Pts
(Spain) Atlético Madrid	3	3	0	0	91	75	+16	6
(Egypt) Zamalek	3	2	0	1	85	77	+8	4
(Qatar) El Jaish	3	1	0	2	77	82	−5	2
(Brazil) Metodista	3	0	0	3	78	97	−19	0

Source: Goalzz

27 August 2012; 15:00	Zamalek (Egypt)	33–24	(Brazil) Metodista	Al-Gharafa Sports Club Hall, Doha; Attendance: 500; Referees: Al-Suwaidi, Bamutref (QAT)
27 August 2012; 15:00	Hussein Zaky 7	(12–14)	Castillo 6	Al-Gharafa Sports Club Hall, Doha; Attendance: 500; Referees: Al-Suwaidi, Bamutref (QAT)
27 August 2012; 15:00	3× (yellow card) 3× (suspension) 0× (red card)	Report	3× (yellow card) 5× (suspension) 0× (red card)	Al-Gharafa Sports Club Hall, Doha; Attendance: 500; Referees: Al-Suwaidi, Bamutref (QAT)

28 August 2012; 20:00	El Jaish (Qatar)	24–27	(Egypt) Zamalek	Al-Gharafa Sports Club Hall, Doha; Attendance: 500; Referees: Al Mutawa, Al Suwailam (KUW)
28 August 2012; 20:00	Horvat 7	(12–12)	Hussein Zaky, Sanad 6	Al-Gharafa Sports Club Hall, Doha; Attendance: 500; Referees: Al Mutawa, Al Suwailam (KUW)
28 August 2012; 20:00	3× (yellow card) 3× (suspension) 0× (red card)	Report	4× (yellow card) 0× (suspension) 0× (red card)	Al-Gharafa Sports Club Hall, Doha; Attendance: 500; Referees: Al Mutawa, Al Suwailam (KUW)

29 August 2012; 16:00	Atlético Madrid (Spain)	29–25	(Egypt) Zamalek	Al-Gharafa Sports Club Hall, Doha; Attendance: 500; Referees: Al Suwaidi, Bamutref (QAT)
29 August 2012; 16:00	Lazarov 7	(12–15)	Ahmed El-Ahmar 11	Al-Gharafa Sports Club Hall, Doha; Attendance: 500; Referees: Al Suwaidi, Bamutref (QAT)
29 August 2012; 16:00	3× (yellow card) 2× (suspension) 0× (red card)	Report	3× (yellow card) 6× (suspension) 0× (red card)	Al-Gharafa Sports Club Hall, Doha; Attendance: 500; Referees: Al Suwaidi, Bamutref (QAT)

=== Semifinals ===
31 August 2012; 20:30	THW Kiel (Germany)	34–24	(Egypt) Zamalek	Al-Gharafa Sports Club Hall, Doha; Attendance: 1,000; Referees: Palsson, Leifsson (ISL)
31 August 2012; 20:30	Wiencek 6	(16–12)	Hussein Zaky 8	Al-Gharafa Sports Club Hall, Doha; Attendance: 1,000; Referees: Palsson, Leifsson (ISL)
31 August 2012; 20:30	3× (yellow card) 2× (suspension) 0× (red card)	Report	3× (yellow card) 1× (suspension) 0× (red card)	Al-Gharafa Sports Club Hall, Doha; Attendance: 1,000; Referees: Palsson, Leifsson (ISL)

=== Third place game ===
1 September 2012; 15:00	Al Sadd (Qatar)	32–26	(Egypt) Zamalek	Al-Gharafa Sports Club Hall, Doha; Attendance: 1,200; Referees: Leifsson, Palsson (ISL)
1 September 2012; 15:00	Gajić 9	(16–11)	Ahmed El-Ahmar 10	Al-Gharafa Sports Club Hall, Doha; Attendance: 1,200; Referees: Leifsson, Palsson (ISL)
1 September 2012; 15:00	3× (yellow card) 5× (suspension) 0× (red card)	Report	3× (yellow card) 6× (suspension) 0× (red card)	Al-Gharafa Sports Club Hall, Doha; Attendance: 1,200; Referees: Leifsson, Palsson (ISL)

=== Final ranking ===
1st place, gold medalist(s)	(Spain) Atlético Madrid
2nd place, silver medalist(s)	(Germany) THW Kiel
3rd place, bronze medalist(s)	(Qatar) Al Sadd
4	(Egypt) Zamalek
5	(Qatar) El Jaish
6	(Brazil) Metodista
7	(Saudi Arabia) Mudhar
8	(Australia) Sydney University

=== Top Scorers ===
Rank	Player	Games	Assists	Goals
1	Ahmed El-Ahmar	5	5	32
2	Hussein Zaky	5	5	26
3	Mohamed Sanad	5	1	18
3	Mamdouh Hashem	5	—	18

== 2018 IHF Super Globe ==
Zamalek withdrew from participating in this competition after qualifying; because of a diplomatic crisis between Egypt and Qatar (host of the competition). Hammamet participated in their place.

== 2019 IHF Super Globe ==
This competition was held in a knock-out format starting from the quarterfinals qualification, and 10 teams participated in this competition, Zamalek began directly from the quarterfinals.

=== Quarterfinal ===
28 August 2019; 14:30	Zamalek SC (Egypt)	28–32	(Germany) THW Kiel	Dammam Sports Hall, Dammam; Attendance: 1,400; Referees: Gubica, Milošević (CRO)
28 August 2019; 14:30	El-Deraa, Saad 6	(12–18)	Bilyk, Ekberg 9	Dammam Sports Hall, Dammam; Attendance: 1,400; Referees: Gubica, Milošević (CRO)
28 August 2019; 14:30	1× (yellow card) 2× (suspension) 0× (red card)	Report	1× (yellow card) 0× (suspension) 0× (red card)	Dammam Sports Hall, Dammam; Attendance: 1,400; Referees: Gubica, Milošević (CRO)

=== Placement round 5–10 ===
Group B

Pos	Team	Pld	W	D	L	GF	GA	GD	Pts
1	(Egypt) Zamalek SC	2	2	0	0	71	50	+21	4
2	(Qatar) Al-Duhail	2	1	0	1	50	52	−2	2
3	(United States) New York City THC	2	0	0	2	43	62	−19	0

Source: IHF
Rules for classification: 1) points; 2) head-to-head points; 3) head-to-head goal difference; 4) head-to-head number of goals scored; 5) goal difference.

30 August 2019; 16:30	Zamalek SC (Egypt)	38–24	(United States) New York City THC	Dammam Sports Hall, Dammam; Attendance: 1,200; Referees: Fonseca, Santos (POR)
30 August 2019; 16:30	Ahmed El-Ahmar 7	(19–15)	Pires 8	Dammam Sports Hall, Dammam; Attendance: 1,200; Referees: Fonseca, Santos (POR)
30 August 2019; 16:30	0× (yellow card) 1× (suspension) 0× (red card)	Report	2× (yellow card) 5× (suspension) 0× (red card)	Dammam Sports Hall, Dammam; Attendance: 1,200; Referees: Fonseca, Santos (POR)

31 August 2019; 12:15	Al-Duhail (Qatar)	26–33	(Egypt) Zamalek SC	Dammam Sports Hall, Dammam; Referees: Schulze, Tönnies (GER)
31 August 2019; 12:15	Maaref 6	(12–15)	Ahmed El-Ahmar, El-Deraa 6	Dammam Sports Hall, Dammam; Referees: Schulze, Tönnies (GER)
31 August 2019; 12:15	0× (yellow card) 6× (suspension) 0× (red card)	Report	2× (yellow card) 3× (suspension) 0× (red card)	Dammam Sports Hall, Dammam; Referees: Schulze, Tönnies (GER)

=== Final ranking ===
1st place, gold medalist(s)	(Spain) FC Barcelona
2nd place, silver medalist(s)	(Germany) THW Kiel
3rd place, bronze medalist(s)	(North Macedonia) RK Vardar
4	(Saudi Arabia) Al Wehda
5	(Egypt) Zamalek
6	(Brazil) Handebol Taubaté
7	(Saudi Arabia) Mudhar
8	(Qatar) Al-Duhail
9	(United States) New York City THC
10	(Australia) Sydney University

=== Top Scorers ===
Rank	Player	Games	Assists	Goals
1	Ahmed El-Ahmar	3	3	18
2	Akram Youssry	3	—	14
3	Yehia El-Deraa	3	10	12

== 2021 IHF Super Globe ==
This competition was held in a knock-out format starting from the quarterfinals qualification, and 10 teams participated in this competition, Zamalek began directly from the quarterfinals.

=== Quarterfinal ===
6 October 2021; 20:30	FC Barcelona (Spain)	36–32	(Egypt) Zamalek SC	King Abdullah Sport City Hall, Jeddah; Referees: Gubica, Milošević (CRO)
6 October 2021; 20:30	Frade, Mem 7	(18–17)	Saad 7	King Abdullah Sport City Hall, Jeddah; Referees: Gubica, Milošević (CRO)
6 October 2021; 20:30	0× (yellow card) 4× (suspension) 0× (red card)	Report	1× (yellow card) 3× (suspension) 0× (red card)	King Abdullah Sport City Hall, Jeddah; Referees: Gubica, Milošević (CRO)

=== Placement round 5–10 ===
Group B

Pos	Team	Pld	W	D	L	GF	GA	GD	Pts
1	(Egypt) Zamalek SC	2	2	0	0	80	41	+39	4
2	(Australia) Sydney University	2	0	1	1	45	64	−19	1
3	(Saudi Arabia) Al Wehda	2	0	1	1	48	68	−20	1

Source: IHF
Rules for classification: 1) points; 2) head-to-head points; 3) head-to-head goal difference; 4) head-to-head number of goals scored; 5) goal difference.

7 October 2021; 16:00	Sydney University (Australia)	19–38	(Egypt) Zamalek SC	King Abdullah Sport City Hall, Jeddah; Attendance: 1,350; Referees: Gatelis, Mažeika (LTU)
7 October 2021; 16:00	Dippe 8	(7–18)	Saad 7	King Abdullah Sport City Hall, Jeddah; Attendance: 1,350; Referees: Gatelis, Mažeika (LTU)
7 October 2021; 16:00	2× (yellow card) 6× (suspension) 0× (red card)	Report	1× (yellow card) 6× (suspension) 0× (red card)	King Abdullah Sport City Hall, Jeddah; Attendance: 1,350; Referees: Gatelis, Mažeika (LTU)

9 October 2021; 16:00	Zamalek SC (Egypt)	42–22	(Saudi Arabia) Al Wehda	King Abdullah Sport City Hall, Jeddah; Attendance: 1,560; Referees: Nachevski, Nikolov (MKD)
9 October 2021; 16:00	Saad 9	(19–10)	Barabash 5	King Abdullah Sport City Hall, Jeddah; Attendance: 1,560; Referees: Nachevski, Nikolov (MKD)
9 October 2021; 16:00	0× (yellow card) 3× (suspension) 0× (red card)	Report	0× (yellow card) 3× (suspension) 0× (red card)	King Abdullah Sport City Hall, Jeddah; Attendance: 1,560; Referees: Nachevski, Nikolov (MKD)

=== Final ranking ===
1st place, gold medalist(s)	(Germany) SC Magdeburg
2nd place, silver medalist(s)	(Spain) FC Barcelona
3rd place, bronze medalist(s)	(Denmark) Aalborg Håndbold
4	(Brazil) EC Pinheiros
5	(Egypt) Zamalek
6	(Qatar) Al Duhail
7	(Saudi Arabia) Al-Noor
8	(Australia) Sydney University
9	(Saudi Arabia) Al Wehda
10	(United States) San Francisco CalHeat

=== Top Scorers ===
Rank	Player	Games	Assists	Goals
1	Akram Youssry (Note: Also, the 2021 IHF Super Globe top scorer (23 goals in 3 games).)	3	2	23
2	Hassan Walid	3	3	12
3	Khalid Waleed	3	1	11

== All-Time Top Scorers ==
Rank	Player	Tournaments	Games	Assists	Goals
1	Ahmed El-Ahmar (Note: Also, the IHF Super Globe all-time top scorer with 202 goals.)	5	19	29	134
2	Mamdouh Hashem	3	13	7	46
3	Hassan Yousry	3	13	17	38
4	Akram Youssry	2	6	2	37
5	Mohammad Sanad	3	13	1	35
6	Hussein Zaky	1	5	5	26
7	Yehia El-Deraa	2	6	18	21
8	Mohamed "Risha" Abd El-Salam	1	4	6	20
9	Rami Youssef	3	12	4	20
10	Belal Awad	2	8	4	20

== Statistics and Records ==
- Zamalek scored 581 goals in the IHF Super Globe.
- 3rd Most Scoring Team in the 2019 IHF Super Globe with 99 goals.
- 1st Most Scoring Team in the 2021 IHF Super Globe with 112 goals.
- 1st goal was scored by "Mohammed Mamdouh Hashem" against Ciudad Real.
- 100th goal was scored by "Ahmed El-Ahmar" against As-Sadd.
- 200th goal was scored by "Mohamed "Risha" Abd El-Salam" against Southern Stars.
- 300th goal was scored by "Mohammad Sanad" against Atletico Madrid.
- 400th goal was scored by "Yehia El-Deraa" against New York City THC.
- 500th goal was scored by "Yehia El-Deraa" against FC Barcelona.
