= 2012 Copa ASOBAL =

XXIII Copa ASOBAL 2012

Tournament details
- Venue(s): Pabellón As Travesas (in Vigo host cities)
- Dates: 21 – 22 December
- Teams: 4

Final positions
- Champions: FC Barcelona Intersport (8th title)
- Runner-up: BM Atlético Madrid

Tournament statistics
- Matches played: 3
- Goals scored: 179 (59.67 per match)
- Attendance: 5,000 (1,667 per match)
- Top scorer(s): Jesper Nøddesbo 13

Awards
- Best player: Raúl Entrerríos

The 2012 Copa ASOBAL was the 23rd edition of the Copa ASOBAL. It took place in the Pabellón As Travesas, in Vigo, Galicia, on 21 & 22 December 2012. It was hosted by Liga ASOBAL, Vigo city council & Academia Octavio. Vigo hosts Copa ASOBAL for third time. FC Barcelona Intersport won its eight title and qualified for 2013–14 EHF Champions League.

== Qualified teams ==
Qualified teams are the top four teams on standings at midseason.

#	Team	P	W	D	L	G+	G−	Dif	Pts
1	Barcelona Borges	15	15	0	0	496	322	174	30
2	Atlético Madrid	15	13	1	1	451	382	69	27
3	Reale Ademar	15	9	1	5	422	385	37	19
4	Naturhouse La Rioja	15	9	1	5	417	399	18	19

== Venue ==
Vigo
Pabellón As Travesas
Capacity: 3,500
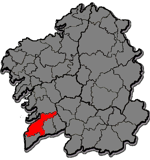

== Matches ==
Semifinals
4	Naturhouse La Rioja	30
2	BM Atlético Madrid	34
1	FC Barcelona Intersport	34
3	Reale Ademar León	25

Final
2	BM Atlético Madrid	24
1	FC Barcelona Intersport	32

=== Semifinals ===
21 December; 19:00 (UTC+1)	Naturhouse La Rioja	30–34	Atlético Madrid	Pabellón As Travesas, Vigo; Attendance: 1,100; Referees: Bustamante López, Álvarez Mata
21 December; 19:00 (UTC+1)	Mindegía 9	(15–15)	Cañellas, Markussen 6	Pabellón As Travesas, Vigo; Attendance: 1,100; Referees: Bustamante López, Álvarez Mata
21 December; 19:00 (UTC+1)	6× (suspension)	Report	4× (suspension)	Pabellón As Travesas, Vigo; Attendance: 1,100; Referees: Bustamante López, Álvarez Mata

21 December; 21:00 (UTC+1)	FC Barcelona Intersport	34–25	Reale Ademar León	Pabellón As Travesas, Vigo; Attendance: 1,400; Referees: Escudero Santiuste, Jesús & Jorge
21 December; 21:00 (UTC+1)	three players 6	(14–12)	Ruesga 8	Pabellón As Travesas, Vigo; Attendance: 1,400; Referees: Escudero Santiuste, Jesús & Jorge
21 December; 21:00 (UTC+1)	4× (suspension)	Report	3× (suspension)	Pabellón As Travesas, Vigo; Attendance: 1,400; Referees: Escudero Santiuste, Jesús & Jorge

=== Final ===
22 December; 18:30 (UTC+1)	Atlético Madrid	24–32	FC Barcelona Intersport	Pabellón As Travesas, Vigo; Attendance: 2,500; Referees: Bustamante López, Álvarez Mata
22 December; 18:30 (UTC+1)	Aguinagalde 4	(13–13)	Nøddesbo 7	Pabellón As Travesas, Vigo; Attendance: 2,500; Referees: Bustamante López, Álvarez Mata
22 December; 18:30 (UTC+1)	2× (suspension)	Report	3× (suspension)	Pabellón As Travesas, Vigo; Attendance: 2,500; Referees: Bustamante López, Álvarez Mata

2012 Copa ASOBAL winners
(Catalonia)
FC Barcelona Intersport
Eighth title

== Top goalscorers ==
Player	Team	Goals
(Denmark) Jesper Nøddesbo	FC Barcelona Intersport	13
(Spain) Raúl Entrerríos	FC Barcelona Intersport	11
(Spain) Niko Mindegia	Naturhouse La Rioja	9
(Spain) Víctor Tomás	FC Barcelona Intersport	9
(Denmark) Nikolaj Markussen	BM Atlético Madrid	9
(Spain) Joan Cañellas	BM Atlético Madrid	9
(Cuba) Jorge Paván	Naturhouse La Rioja	8
(Spain) Carlos Ruesga	Reale Ademar León	8
(Spain) Julen Aguinagalde	BM Atlético Madrid	8
(North Macedonia) Kiril Lazarov	BM Atlético Madrid	7

== See also ==
- Liga ASOBAL 2012–13
- Copa del Rey de Balonmano 2012–13
