= Raúl González (handballer) =

Spanish handball player (born 1970)

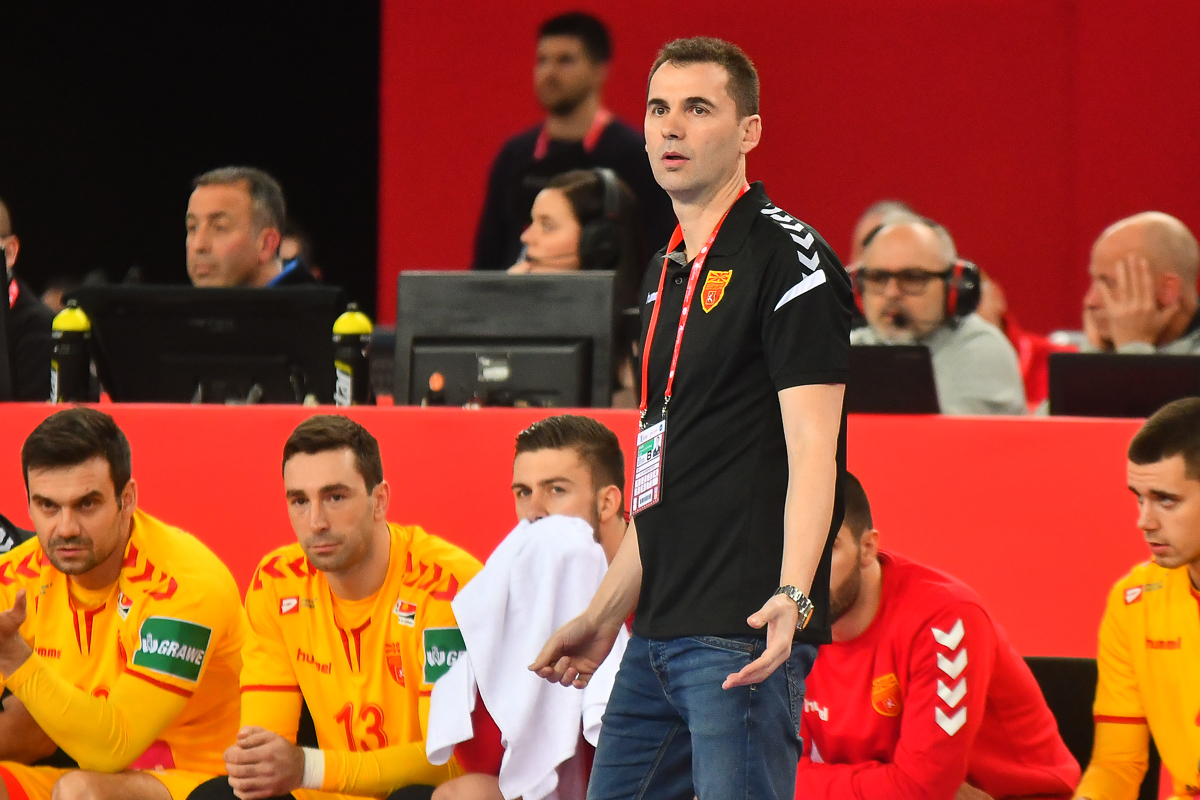
- González in 2018

Personal information
- Full name: Raúl González Gutiérrez
- Nationality: Spanish
- Born: 8 January 1970 (age 56) Valladolid, Spain

Sport
- Sport: Handball
- Current club: Serbia (head coach)

Senior clubs
- Years: Team
- 1987–2005: BM Valladolid
National team
Years	Team	Apps	(Gls)
1995–2001	Spain	57	(55)

Teams managed
- 2005–2011: BM Ciudad Real (assistant)
- 2011–2013: Atlético Madrid (assistant)
- 2014–2018: Vardar
- 2017–2019: Macedonia
- 2018–2025: Paris Saint-Germain
- 2025–present: Serbia
- 2026: Partizan
Medal record
Men's handball
Representing Spain
Olympic Games
Bronze medal – third place	1996 Atlanta	Team
European Championship
Silver medal – second place	1996 Spain

Raúl González Gutiérrez (born 8 January 1970) is a Spanish handball coach and former player who competed in the 1996 Summer Olympics. He is the current head coach of the Serbia national team.

== Biography ==
In 1996 he was a member of the Spanish handball team which won the bronze medal. He played six matches and scored five goals. After his career in late 2005 was Raúl González assistant coach of Talant Duyshebaev at BM Ciudad Real and his successor BM Atlético Madrid. Following the withdrawal of Madrid in the summer of 2013. He was without a club. In January 2014 he took over as coach at the Macedonian club RK Vardar. With Vardar he won the 2016–2017 EHF Champions League as a head coach, 2016–2017 SEHA League and many domestic league and cup titles. In the 2013–14 EHF Champions League he turned in the second round to defending champion HSV Hamburg made, before he lost in the quarterfinals of the SG Flensburg-Handewitt due to the away goals rule.

== Honours ==
=== Player ===
BM Valladolid

- Spanish Cup: 2005
- Copa ASOBAL: 2003

=== Assistant coach ===
BM Ciudad Real

- EHF Champions League: 2005–06, 2007–08, 2008–09
- EHF Champions Trophy: 2005, 2006, 2008
- IHF Super Globe: 2007, 2010
- Liga ASOBAL: 2006–07, 2007–08, 2008–09, 2009–10
- Copa del Rey: 2008, 2011
- Copa ASOBAL: 2006, 2007, 2008, 2011
- Supercopa ASOBAL: 2008, 2011

Atlético Madrid

- IHF Super Globe: 2012
- Copa del Rey: 2012, 2013
- Supercopa ASOBAL: 2012

=== Manager ===
RK Vardar

- EHF Champions League: 2016–17
- SEHA League: 2013–14, 2016–17, 2017–18
- Macedonian League: 2014–15, 2015–16, 2016–17, 2017–18
- Macedonian Cup: 2014, 2015, 2016, 2017, 2018
- Macedonian Supercup: 2017

Paris Saint-Germain

- French League: 2018–19, 2019–20, 2020–21, 2021–22, 2022–23, 2023–24, 2024–25
- French Cup: 2020–21, 2021–22
- French Ligue Cup: 2018–19
- Trophée des champions: 2019, 2023

Partizan

- Serbian Supercup: 2026
- All-Serbian Cup: 2026

=== Individual awards ===
- French Championship Best Coach: 2020
