= Miguel Sánchez-Migallón =

Spanish handball player (born 1995)

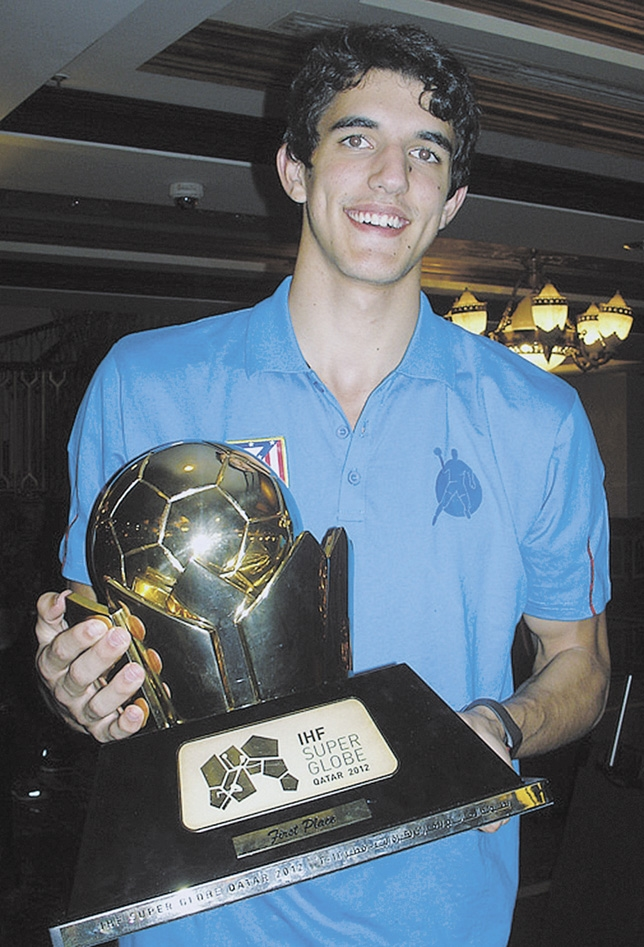
- Sánchez-Migallón in 2012

Personal information
- Full name: Miguel Sánchez-Migallón Naranjo
- Nationality: Spanish
- Born: 8 February 1995 (age 31) Ciudad Real, Spain
- Height: 2.00 m (6 ft 7 in)

Sport
- Sport: Handball
- Position: Left wing

Youth career
- Years: Team
- 2004–2006: San Francisco Javier
- 2006–2010: Pio XII
- 2010–2012: Ciudad Real

Senior clubs
- Years: Team
- 2012–2013: Atlético Madrid
- 2013: Aragón
- 2013–2021: Ciudad de Logroño
- 2021–2023: Vive Kielce
- 2023–2026: S.L. Benfica
- 2026: Partizan
National team
Years	Team	Apps	(Gls)
2016–present	Spain	63	(37)
Medal record
Men's handball
Representing Spain
Olympic Games
Bronze medal – third place	2020 Tokyo	Team
Bronze medal – third place	2024 Paris	Team
World Championship
Bronze medal – third place	2023 Poland–Sweden
European Championship
Silver medal – second place	2022 Hungary–Slovakia
- Updated on 13 January 2025

Miguel Sánchez-Migallón Naranjo (born 8 February 1995) is a Spanish handball player who last played for Partizan. He also represents the Spanish national team.

== Honours ==
Atlético Madrid

- Copa del Rey: 2012–13
- Supercopa ASOBAL: 2012
- IHF Super Globe: 2012

Vive Kielce

- Polish Superliga: 2021–22, 2022–23

Partizan

- Serbian Supercup: 2026
- All-Serbian Cup: 2026
