= 2012–13 Copa del Rey de Balonmano =

2013 Copa del Rey de Balonmano
XXXVIII Copa del Rey 2012–13

Tournament details
- Venue(s): Palacio de los Deportes de La Rioja (in Logroño (Final Four) host cities)
- Dates: 5 December – 4 May
- Teams: 16

Final positions
- Champions: BM Atlético Madrid (12th title)
- Runner-up: Naturhouse La Rioja

Tournament statistics
- Matches played: 19
- Goals scored: 1,090 (57.37 per match)
- Attendance: 32,313 (1,701 per match)
- Top scorer(s): Kiril Lazarov 27

Awards
- Best player: Julen Aguinagalde

The Copa del Rey de Balonmano 2012–13 was the 38th edition of the Copa del Rey de Balonmano, hosted by Liga ASOBAL. For this edition, the tournament undergoes a competition format change, being played as follows:

The final four took place at Palacio de los Deportes de La Rioja, Logroño on 3 & 4 May.

Atlético Madrid won its twelfth title including those that won with former name (Atlético Madrid BM) and current name (BM Neptuno).

== Competition format ==
=== Knockout stage ===
- Round of 16 (single match)
- Quarter-final (two legs)
- Final Four (four quarter-final winners)

=== Final four ===
- Semi-final (single match)
- Final (single match)

== Calendar ==
Round	Date	Fixtures	Clubs	Notes
Round of 16	5 December 2012	8	16 → 8	Liga ASOBAL teams
Quarter-finals	27 February 2013	4	8 → 4	
Quarter-finals	27 March 2013	4	8 → 4	
Final Four	4 & 5 May 2013	3	4 → 1	

== Round of 16 ==
Matches played on 5 December 2012.

All times are CET.

Team 1	Score	Team 2
Helvetia Anaitasuna (Navarre)	29–33	(Catalonia) FC Barcelona Intersport
ARS Palma del Río (Andalusia)	30–32 (a.e.t.)	(Aragon) BM Aragón
Academia Octavio (Galicia (Spain))	24–36	(Community of Madrid) Atlético Madrid
Fertiberia Puerto Sagunto (Valencian Community)	26–25	(Castile and León) Cuatro Rayas Valladolid
BM Huesca (Aragon)	30–37	(Catalonia) Fraikin Granollers
Quabit Guadalajara (Castilla–La Mancha)	18–32	(Castile and León) Reale Ademar León
V. Aranda Autocares Bayo (Castile and León)	21–29	Naturhouse La Rioja
Frigoríficos del Morrazo (Galicia (Spain))	23–24	(Castilla–La Mancha) GlobalCaja Ciudad Encantada

=== Matches ===
4 December 2012; 20:00	Helvetia Anaitasuna	29–33	FC Barcelona Intersport	Pabellón Anaitasuna, Pamplona; Attendance: 2,200; Referees: Merino Mori, Moyano Prieto
4 December 2012; 20:00	Reig 7	(12–16)	García 9	Pabellón Anaitasuna, Pamplona; Attendance: 2,200; Referees: Merino Mori, Moyano Prieto
4 December 2012; 20:00	2× (yellow card) 6× (suspension) 1× (red card)	Report	3× (yellow card) 5× (suspension)	Pabellón Anaitasuna, Pamplona; Attendance: 2,200; Referees: Merino Mori, Moyano Prieto

4 December 2012; 20:45	Academia Octavio	24–36	Atlético Madrid	Pavillón de As Travesas, Vigo; Attendance: 300; Referees: Casado Fernández, Vera Ávila
4 December 2012; 20:45	Källman 9	(10–18)	Lazarov, Cañellas 5	Pavillón de As Travesas, Vigo; Attendance: 300; Referees: Casado Fernández, Vera Ávila
4 December 2012; 20:45	2× (yellow card) 2× (suspension)	Report	2× (yellow card) 3× (suspension)	Pavillón de As Travesas, Vigo; Attendance: 300; Referees: Casado Fernández, Vera Ávila

5 December 2012; 20:15	Fertiberia Puerto Sagunto	26–25	Cuatro Rayas Valladolid	Pabellón Municipal, Puerto de Sagunto; Attendance: 1,500; Referees: Álvarez Mata, Bustamante López
5 December 2012; 20:15	Tarrasó 7	(13–14)	Krivokapić 7	Pabellón Municipal, Puerto de Sagunto; Attendance: 1,500; Referees: Álvarez Mata, Bustamante López
5 December 2012; 20:15	3× (yellow card) 7× (suspension)	Report	3× (yellow card) 4× (suspension) 1× (red card)	Pabellón Municipal, Puerto de Sagunto; Attendance: 1,500; Referees: Álvarez Mata, Bustamante López

5 December 2012; 20:30	Quabit Guadalajara	18–32	Reale Ademar León	Pabellón Multiusos, Guadalajara; Attendance: 600; Referees: Raluy López, Sabroso Ramírez
5 December 2012; 20:30	de la Salud 5	(7–14)	Ruesga 10	Pabellón Multiusos, Guadalajara; Attendance: 600; Referees: Raluy López, Sabroso Ramírez
5 December 2012; 20:30	3× (yellow card) 2× (suspension)	Report	2× (yellow card) 3× (suspension)	Pabellón Multiusos, Guadalajara; Attendance: 600; Referees: Raluy López, Sabroso Ramírez

5 December 2012; 20:30	V. Aranda Autocares Bayo	21–29	Naturhouse La Rioja	Polideportivo Príncipe de Asturias, Aranda de Duero; Attendance: 2,000; Referees: García Mosquera, Ríos Martín
5 December 2012; 20:30	Kike Plaza 6	(10–17)	Cuartero 7	Polideportivo Príncipe de Asturias, Aranda de Duero; Attendance: 2,000; Referees: García Mosquera, Ríos Martín
5 December 2012; 20:30	3× (yellow card) 4× (suspension)	Report	2× (yellow card) 6× (suspension)	Polideportivo Príncipe de Asturias, Aranda de Duero; Attendance: 2,000; Referees: García Mosquera, Ríos Martín

5 December 2012; 20:45	ARS Palma del Río	30–32 (a.e.t.)	BM Aragón	Polideportivo Municipal "El Pandero", Palma del Río; Attendance: 375; Referees: Pastor Gamón, Rodríguez Rodríguez
5 December 2012; 20:45	Luisfe 10	(10–12)	Dujshebaev 9	Polideportivo Municipal "El Pandero", Palma del Río; Attendance: 375; Referees: Pastor Gamón, Rodríguez Rodríguez
5 December 2012; 20:45	2× (suspension)	Report	3× (suspension)	Polideportivo Municipal "El Pandero", Palma del Río; Attendance: 375; Referees: Pastor Gamón, Rodríguez Rodríguez

5 December 2012; 21:00	BM Huesca	30–37	Fraikin Granollers	Palacio de Deportes, Huesca; Attendance: 1,300; Referees: Ruiz González, Zapico Fernández
5 December 2012; 21:00	Demovič 6	(15–18)	Félez 8	Palacio de Deportes, Huesca; Attendance: 1,300; Referees: Ruiz González, Zapico Fernández
5 December 2012; 21:00	3× (yellow card) 2× (suspension) 1× (red card)	Report	3× (yellow card) 2× (suspension)	Palacio de Deportes, Huesca; Attendance: 1,300; Referees: Ruiz González, Zapico Fernández

5 December 2012; 21:00	Frigoríficos del Morrazo	23–24	GlobalCaja Ciudad Encantada	Pabellón Municipal "O Gatañal", Cangas do Morrazo; Attendance: 800; Referees: Jorge & Jesús Escudero Santiuste
5 December 2012; 21:00	Lasiça, Rosales 5	(11–11)	Pérez, Sifré 6	Pabellón Municipal "O Gatañal", Cangas do Morrazo; Attendance: 800; Referees: Jorge & Jesús Escudero Santiuste
5 December 2012; 21:00	6× (suspension)	Report	7× (suspension)	Pabellón Municipal "O Gatañal", Cangas do Morrazo; Attendance: 800; Referees: Jorge & Jesús Escudero Santiuste

Teams qualified to next round
FC Barcelona Intersport	Atlético Madrid	Fertiberia Puerto Sagunto	Reale Ademar León
Naturhouse La Rioja	BM Aragón	Fraikin Granollers	GlobalCaja Ciudad Encantada

== Quarter finals ==
Round to be played in two legs. The matches were played on 27 February and 27 March 2013.

All times are CET.

Team 1	Agg.	Team 2	1st leg	2nd leg
Naturhouse La Rioja	68–53	(Castilla–La Mancha) GlobalCaja Ciudad Encantada	35–27	33–26
BM Aragón (Aragon)	59–70	(Catalonia) FC Barcelona Intersport	30–34	29–36
Reale Ademar León (Castile and León)	47–47 (a)	(Valencian Community) Fertiberia Puerto Sagunto	24–24	23–23
Fraikin Granollers (Catalonia)	53–63	(Community of Madrid) Atlético Madrid	25–30	28–33

=== Matches ===
==== First leg ====
27 February 2013; 20:45 (UTC+1)	Naturhouse La Rioja	35–27	GlobalCaja Ciudad Encantada	Palacio de los Deportes, Logroño; Attendance: 2,000; Referees: Muro San José, Rodríguez Murcia
27 February 2013; 20:45 (UTC+1)	Mindegia 9	(14–13)	Simonet 6	Palacio de los Deportes, Logroño; Attendance: 2,000; Referees: Muro San José, Rodríguez Murcia
27 February 2013; 20:45 (UTC+1)	7× (suspension) 1× (red card)	Report	5× (suspension)	Palacio de los Deportes, Logroño; Attendance: 2,000; Referees: Muro San José, Rodríguez Murcia

27 February 2013; 20:45 (UTC+1)	BM Aragón	30–34	FC Barcelona Intersport	Príncipe Felipe, Zaragoza; Attendance: 1,100; Referees: García Rodríguez, Fernández Pérez
27 February 2013; 20:45 (UTC+1)	Dujshebaev 8	(14–19)	three players 5	Príncipe Felipe, Zaragoza; Attendance: 1,100; Referees: García Rodríguez, Fernández Pérez
27 February 2013; 20:45 (UTC+1)		Report	3× (suspension)	Príncipe Felipe, Zaragoza; Attendance: 1,100; Referees: García Rodríguez, Fernández Pérez

27 February 2013; 20:45 (UTC+1)	Reale Ademar León	24–24	Fertiberia Puerto Sagunto	Palacio de los Deportes, León; Attendance: 2,500; Referees: Ruiz González, Zapico Fernández
27 February 2013; 20:45 (UTC+1)	Borges 5	(9–11)	Milašević 7	Palacio de los Deportes, León; Attendance: 2,500; Referees: Ruiz González, Zapico Fernández
27 February 2013; 20:45 (UTC+1)	2× (suspension)	Report	2× (suspension)	Palacio de los Deportes, León; Attendance: 2,500; Referees: Ruiz González, Zapico Fernández

27 February 2013; 21:00 (UTC+1)	Fraikin Granollers	25–30	Atlético Madrid	Palau d'Esports, Granollers; Attendance: 1,400; Referees: Casado Fernández, Vera Ávila
27 February 2013; 21:00 (UTC+1)	Salinas 8	(11–11)	Lazarov 8	Palau d'Esports, Granollers; Attendance: 1,400; Referees: Casado Fernández, Vera Ávila
27 February 2013; 21:00 (UTC+1)	2× (suspension)	Report	4× (suspension) 1× (red card)	Palau d'Esports, Granollers; Attendance: 1,400; Referees: Casado Fernández, Vera Ávila

==== Second leg ====
26 March 2013; 19:30 (UTC+1)	Atlético Madrid	33–28	Fraikin Granollers	Palacio Vistalegre, Madrid; Attendance: 1,738; Referees: Gude Prego, Juan José & Javier
26 March 2013; 19:30 (UTC+1)	Fernández 8	(17–14)	Campos 7	Palacio Vistalegre, Madrid; Attendance: 1,738; Referees: Gude Prego, Juan José & Javier
26 March 2013; 19:30 (UTC+1)	3× (yellow card) 5× (suspension)	Report	2× (yellow card) 2× (suspension)	Palacio Vistalegre, Madrid; Attendance: 1,738; Referees: Gude Prego, Juan José & Javier

27 March 2013; 17:00 (UTC+1)	GlobalCaja Ciudad Encantada	26–33	Naturhouse La Rioja	El Sargal, Cuenca; Attendance: 800; Referees: Pastor Gamón, Rodríguez Rodríguez
27 March 2013; 17:00 (UTC+1)	Corzo 6	(14–14)	dos Santos 8	El Sargal, Cuenca; Attendance: 800; Referees: Pastor Gamón, Rodríguez Rodríguez
27 March 2013; 17:00 (UTC+1)	3× (yellow card) 4× (suspension)	Report	3× (yellow card) 7× (suspension)	El Sargal, Cuenca; Attendance: 800; Referees: Pastor Gamón, Rodríguez Rodríguez

27 March 2013; 20:15 (UTC+1)	Fertiberia Puerto Sagunto	23–23	Reale Ademar León	Pabellón Internúcleos, Puerto de Sagunto, Sagunto; Attendance: 1,200; Referees: Marín Lorente, García Serradilla
27 March 2013; 20:15 (UTC+1)	Serrano 6	(13–9)	Vražalić 6	Pabellón Internúcleos, Puerto de Sagunto, Sagunto; Attendance: 1,200; Referees: Marín Lorente, García Serradilla
27 March 2013; 20:15 (UTC+1)	3× (yellow card) 2× (suspension) 1× (red card)	Report	2× (yellow card) 4× (suspension)	Pabellón Internúcleos, Puerto de Sagunto, Sagunto; Attendance: 1,200; Referees: Marín Lorente, García Serradilla

27 March 2013; 21:00 (UTC+1)	FC Barcelona Intersport	36–29	BM Aragón	Palau Blaugrana, Barcelona; Attendance: 1,400; Referees: Escudero Santiuste, Jesús & Jorge
27 March 2013; 21:00 (UTC+1)	Aguirrezabalaga 5	(17–15)	García 7	Palau Blaugrana, Barcelona; Attendance: 1,400; Referees: Escudero Santiuste, Jesús & Jorge
27 March 2013; 21:00 (UTC+1)	3× (yellow card) 5× (suspension)	Report	2× (yellow card) 1× (suspension)	Palau Blaugrana, Barcelona; Attendance: 1,400; Referees: Escudero Santiuste, Jesús & Jorge

Teams qualified to Final Four
Atlético Madrid	Naturhouse La Rioja
Fertiberia Puerto Sagunto	FC Barcelona Intersport

== Final four ==
The Final Four draw took place on 26 April at Consejo Regulador de la Denominación de Origen Rioja de Logroño's headquarters.

Semifinals
Fertiberia Puerto Sagunto	25
Naturhouse La Rioja	31
FC Barcelona Intersport	28
BM Atlético Madrid	31

Final
Naturhouse La Rioja	28
BM Atlético Madrid	38

=== Semifinals ===
3 May; 19:00 (UTC+2)	FC Barcelona Intersport	28–31	BM Atlético Madrid	Palacio de los Deportes, Logroño; Attendance: 3,500; Referees: Raluy López, Sabroso Ramírez
3 May; 19:00 (UTC+2)	V. Tomás 8	(8–14)	three players 6	Palacio de los Deportes, Logroño; Attendance: 3,500; Referees: Raluy López, Sabroso Ramírez
3 May; 19:00 (UTC+2)	3× (yellow card) 4× (suspension)	Report	3× (yellow card) 7× (suspension)	Palacio de los Deportes, Logroño; Attendance: 3,500; Referees: Raluy López, Sabroso Ramírez

3 May; 21:30 (UTC+2)	Naturhouse La Rioja	31–25	Fertiberia Puerto Sagunto	Palacio de los Deportes, Logroño; Attendance: 3,800; Referees: Rodríguez Rodríguez, Pastor Gamón
3 May; 21:30 (UTC+2)	Paván, Cuartero 5	(18–13)	Chernov, Chispi 6	Palacio de los Deportes, Logroño; Attendance: 3,800; Referees: Rodríguez Rodríguez, Pastor Gamón
3 May; 21:30 (UTC+2)	3× (yellow card) 2× (suspension)	Report	3× (yellow card) 3× (suspension)	Palacio de los Deportes, Logroño; Attendance: 3,800; Referees: Rodríguez Rodríguez, Pastor Gamón

=== Final ===
4 May; 18:30 (UTC+2)	Naturhouse La Rioja	28–38	BM Atlético Madrid	Palacio de los Deportes, Logroño; Attendance: 3,800; Referees: Muro San José, Rodríguez Murcia
4 May; 18:30 (UTC+2)	T. Petrus 8	(15–18)	Aguinagalde, Jurkiewicz 8	Palacio de los Deportes, Logroño; Attendance: 3,800; Referees: Muro San José, Rodríguez Murcia
4 May; 18:30 (UTC+2)	3× (yellow card) 4× (suspension)	Report	3× (yellow card) 4× (suspension)	Palacio de los Deportes, Logroño; Attendance: 3,800; Referees: Muro San José, Rodríguez Murcia

2012–13 Copa del Rey de Balonmano winners
(Community of Madrid)
Atlético Madrid
Twelfth title

== Top goalscorers ==
- Updated after Final Four, Final

Player	Team	Goals
(North Macedonia) Kiril Lazarov	Atlético Madrid	27
(Brazil) Thiagus Petrus	Naturhouse La Rioja	25
(Cuba) Jorge Paván	Naturhouse La Rioja	23
(Spain) Alex Dujshebaev	BM Aragón	21
(Spain) Julen Aguinagalde	Atlético Madrid	21
(Spain) David Cuartero	Naturhouse La Rioja	18
(Montenegro) Mirko Milašević	Fertiberia Puerto Sagunto	18
(Spain) Javier García	BM Aragón	17
(Spain) Joan Cañellas	Atlético Madrid	17
(Spain) Niko Mindegía	Naturhouse La Rioja	15
(Chile) Rodrigo Salinas	Fraikin Granollers	15

== See also ==
- Liga ASOBAL 2012–13
- Copa ASOBAL 2012
