= 2012 Copa del Rey de Balonmano =

XXXVII Copa del Rey Torrevieja 2012

Tournament details
- Venue(s): Infanta Cristina (in Torrevieja host cities)
- Dates: 7 – 11 March
- Teams: 8

Final positions
- Champions: Atlético Madrid (6th title)
- Runner-up: Barcelona Intersport

Tournament statistics
- Matches played: 7
- Goals scored: 393 (56.14 per match)
- Attendance: 13,600 (1,943 per match)

The 2012 Copa del Rey de Balonmano was the 37th edition of the Copa del Rey de Balonmano. It took place in the Palacio de los Deportes Infanta Cristina, in Torrevieja, Valencian Community, between 7 & 11 March 2012. It was hosted by Liga ASOBAL, Torrevieja city council, Costa Blanca Tourism & Hotel La Laguna. Torrevieja was the host team. Torrevieja hosted Copa del Rey for second time from 2002.

== Qualified teams ==
The qualified teams were the top seven teams on standings at midseason, besides the host team.

#	Team	P	W	D	L	G+	G−	Dif	Pts
1	Barcelona Borges	15	15	0	0	518	368	150	30
2	Atlético Madrid	15	14	0	1	548	410	138	28
3	Cuatro Rayas Valladolid	15	9	3	3	441	394	47	21
4	Reale Ademar	15	10	1	4	442	397	45	21
5	Caja3 Aragón	15	8	0	7	441	425	16	16
6	Naturhouse La Rioja	15	7	2	6	440	438	2	16
7	Academia Octavio	15	6	3	6	413	443	-30	15
9	Torrevieja	15	6	3	6	394	398	-4	15

== Venue ==
Torrevieja
Palacio de los Deportes Infanta Cristina
Capacity: 3,500
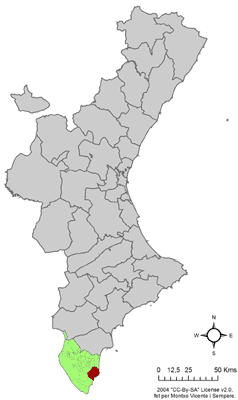

== Matches ==
Quarter-finals
March 8 - Infanta Cristina
Torrevieja	27
Caja3 Aragón	24
March 8 - Infanta Cristina
Atlético Madrid	35
Reale Ademar León	28
March 7 - Infanta Cristina
Cuatro Rayas Valladolid	32
Academia Octavio	24
March 7 - Infanta Cristina
Naturhouse La Rioja	26
FC Barcelona Intersport	28

Semi-finals
March 10 - Infanta Cristina
Torrevieja	20
Atlético Madrid	27
March 10 - Infanta Cristina
Cuatro Rayas Valladolid	26
FC Barcelona Intersport	28

Final
March 11 - Infanta Cristina
Atlético Madrid	37
FC Barcelona Intersport	31

=== Quarter-finals ===
March 7; 19:00 UTC+1	Cuatro Rayas Valladolid	32–24	Academia Octavio	Infanta Cristina, Torrevieja; Attendance: 800; Referees: García Mosquera & Ríos Martín
March 7; 19:00 UTC+1	Ángel Romero, 9	(13–12)	Raúl Nantes, 12	Infanta Cristina, Torrevieja; Attendance: 800; Referees: García Mosquera & Ríos Martín
March 7; 19:00 UTC+1	2× (yellow card) 2× (suspension)	Report	3× (yellow card) 4× (suspension)	Infanta Cristina, Torrevieja; Attendance: 800; Referees: García Mosquera & Ríos Martín

March 7; 21:00 UTC+1	Naturhouse La Rioja	26–28	FC Barcelona Intersport	Infanta Cristina, Torrevieja; Attendance: 1,000; Referees: Álvarez Mata & Bustamante López
March 7; 21:00 UTC+1	Nikola Prce, 10	(14–13)	Siarhei Rutenka, 8	Infanta Cristina, Torrevieja; Attendance: 1,000; Referees: Álvarez Mata & Bustamante López
March 7; 21:00 UTC+1	2× (yellow card) 2× (suspension) 1× (red card)	Report	3× (yellow card) 3× (suspension)	Infanta Cristina, Torrevieja; Attendance: 1,000; Referees: Álvarez Mata & Bustamante López

March 8; 19:00 UTC+1	Atlético de Madrid	35–28	Reale Ademar León	Infanta Cristina, Torrevieja; Attendance: 1,000; Referees: Álvarez Mata & Bustamante López
March 8; 19:00 UTC+1	Julen Aguinagalde, 10	(20–14)	two players, 6	Infanta Cristina, Torrevieja; Attendance: 1,000; Referees: Álvarez Mata & Bustamante López
March 8; 19:00 UTC+1	3× (yellow card) 3× (suspension)	Report	2× (yellow card) 5× (suspension)	Infanta Cristina, Torrevieja; Attendance: 1,000; Referees: Álvarez Mata & Bustamante López

March 8; 21:00 UTC+1	Torrevieja	27–24 (a.e.t.)	Caja3 Aragón	Infanta Cristina, Torrevieja; Attendance: 2,300; Referees: García Mosquera & Ríos Martín
March 8; 21:00 UTC+1	Jorge Sánchez, 7	(14–15)	Antonio Cartón, 8	Infanta Cristina, Torrevieja; Attendance: 2,300; Referees: García Mosquera & Ríos Martín
March 8; 21:00 UTC+1	2× (yellow card) 2× (suspension)	Report	3× (yellow card) 4× (suspension)	Infanta Cristina, Torrevieja; Attendance: 2,300; Referees: García Mosquera & Ríos Martín

=== Semifinals ===
March 10; 18:00 UTC+1	Cuatro Rayas Valladolid	26–28	FC Barcelona Intersport	Infanta Cristina, Torrevieja; Attendance: 2,500; Referees: Raluy López & Sabroso Ramírez
March 10; 18:00 UTC+1	Guillaume Joli, 6	(16–13)	Siarhei Rutenka, 6	Infanta Cristina, Torrevieja; Attendance: 2,500; Referees: Raluy López & Sabroso Ramírez
March 10; 18:00 UTC+1	3× (yellow card) 4× (suspension)	Report	3× (yellow card) 5× (suspension)	Infanta Cristina, Torrevieja; Attendance: 2,500; Referees: Raluy López & Sabroso Ramírez

March 10; 20:00 UTC+1	Torrevieja	20–27	Atlético de Madrid	Infanta Cristina, Torrevieja; Attendance: 2,500; Referees: García Serradilla & Marín Lorente
March 10; 20:00 UTC+1	Eloy González, 8	(9–13)	Kiril Lazarov, 6	Infanta Cristina, Torrevieja; Attendance: 2,500; Referees: García Serradilla & Marín Lorente
March 10; 20:00 UTC+1	3× (yellow card) 4× (suspension)	Report	3× (yellow card) 3× (suspension)	Infanta Cristina, Torrevieja; Attendance: 2,500; Referees: García Serradilla & Marín Lorente

=== Final ===
March 11; 16:00 UTC+1	Atlético de Madrid	37–31	FC Barcelona Intersport	Infanta Cristina, Torrevieja; Attendance: 3,500; Referees: García Fernández & Pastor Gamón
March 11; 16:00 UTC+1	Kiril Lazarov, 7	(14–15)	Raúl Entrerríos, 6	Infanta Cristina, Torrevieja; Attendance: 3,500; Referees: García Fernández & Pastor Gamón
March 11; 16:00 UTC+1	2× (yellow card) 3× (suspension)	Report	3× (yellow card) 4× (suspension)	Infanta Cristina, Torrevieja; Attendance: 3,500; Referees: García Fernández & Pastor Gamón

2012 Copa del Rey de Balonmano winners
(Community of Madrid)
Atlético Madrid
Sixth title

== See also ==
- Liga ASOBAL 2011–12
- División de Plata de Balonmano 2011–12
