= 2005 Copa del Rey de Balonmano =

Logo

The 2004/2005 edition of Copa del Rey de Balonmano was held in Pontevedra, Galicia. The champion was BM Valladolid.

== Quarterfinals ==
25 May 2005:

- CD Bidasoa 28-32 BM Valladolid:
- Caja España Ademar León 31-27 Portland San Antonio:

26 May 2005:

- BM Ciudad Real 39-24 BM Granollers:
- SD Teucro 25-37 FC Barcelona Handbol:

== Semifinals ==
28 May 2005:

- BM Ciudad Real 31-34 BM Valladolid:
- FC Barcelona Handbol 33-28 Caja España Ademar León:

=== Final ===
29 May 2005 xx:xx	BM Valladolid	27–25	FC Barcelona	Pabellón Municipal dos Deportes, Pontevedra; Attendance: 3,000; Referees: Fernández, Permuy
29 May 2005 xx:xx	Gull 7	(14–13)	Romero 6	Pabellón Municipal dos Deportes, Pontevedra; Attendance: 3,000; Referees: Fernández, Permuy
29 May 2005 xx:xx	5× (suspension)	El Mundo	8× (suspension)	Pabellón Municipal dos Deportes, Pontevedra; Attendance: 3,000; Referees: Fernández, Permuy

- BM Valladolid:
  - Goalkeepers: José Manuel Sierra, Asier Zubiría
  - Players: José Manuel García (1), Eric Gull (7, 2p), Raúl González (-), Julio Fis (5, 1p), David Davis (5), Rubén Garabaya (2), Asier Antonio (-), José Ángel Delgado Ávila (-), Chema Rodríguez (3), Juan Bosco Rentero (4).
  - Sanctions: Asier Antonio (2), Delgado, Garabaya, Davis
  - Coach: Juan Carlos Pastor.
- FC Barcelona
  - Goalkeepers: David Barrufet, Dejan Perić
  - Players: Fernando Hernández (3, 1p), Salva Puig (-), László Nagy (4), Lars Krogh Jeppesen (3), Jérôme Fernandez (3), Luka Zvizej (1), Iker Romero (6, 1p), Dragan Škrbić (4), Davor Dominiković (1), Víctor Tomás (-), Xavier O'Callaghan (-).
  - Sanctions: Nagy (2), Dominiković (2), Tomás, Fernandez (2), Zvizej
  - Coach: Xesco Espar

Score:2-2, 5-3, 6-5, 8-8, 11-11, 14-13 (HT) 16-17, 19-20, 22-22, 24-22, 25-24,27-25 (Final).

== See also ==
- Liga ASOBAL
- Handball in Spain
