= 2019 IHF Super Globe =

Tournament details
- Host country: Saudi Arabia
- Venue: 1 (in 1 host city)
- Dates: 27–31 August
- Teams: 10 (from 6 confederations)

Final positions
- Champions: (Spain) FC Barcelona (5th title)
- Runners-up: (Germany) THW Kiel
- Third place: (North Macedonia) RK Vardar
- Fourth place: (Saudi Arabia) Al Wehda

Tournament statistics
- Matches played: 16
- Goals scored: 933 (58.31 per match)
- Top scorers: (Tunisia) Skander Zaïdi (29 goals)

The 2019 IHF Super Globe was the thirteenth edition of the IHF Men's Super Globe, a yearly club world championship in handball organised by the International Handball Federation (IHF). The tournament was held in Dammam, Saudi Arabia from 27 to 31 August 2019.

FC Barcelona won their fifth title and third in a row after defeating THW Kiel 34–32 in the final.

== Venue ==
The championship was played in Dammam, at the Ministry of Sports Hall.

Dammam	2019 IHF Super Globe is located in Saudi Arabia
Ministry of Sports Hall; Capacity: 5000	2019 IHF Super Globe is located in Saudi Arabia

== Teams ==
Location of the teams

Ten teams were competing in the 2019 tournament, two more than in previous tournament. This is due to the split of the Pan-American Team Handball Federation at an IHF Council meeting in Zagreb which was split into the North America and the Caribbean Handball Confederation (NACHC) and the South and Central America Handball Confederation (SCAHC). New York City THC became the first team from North America to compete in the IHF Super Globe after finishing top of the continental championship. The winners of continental tournaments, the defending champion, a host team and wild card teams participated.

Team	Qualified as
(Spain) FC Barcelona	Defending champion
(Egypt) Zamalek SC	Winner of Africa Men's Handball Super Cup
(Qatar) Al-Duhail SC	Winner of Asian Club League Championship
(Australia) Sydney University	Winner of Oceania Handball Champions Cup
(United States) New York City THC	Winner of North American and the Caribbean Senior Club Championship
(Brazil) Handebol Taubaté	Winner of South and Central American Men's Club Handball Championship
(North Macedonia) RK Vardar	Winner of EHF Champions League
(Saudi Arabia) Al Wehda	Host for winning the domestic league
(Germany) THW Kiel	Wildcard
(Saudi Arabia) Al Mudhar	Wildcard

== Results ==
All times are local (UTC+3).

=== Bracket ===
Quarterfinals qualification
Aug 27
(Saudi Arabia) Al Mudhar	33
(United States) New York City THC	13
Aug 27
(Australia) Sydney University	27
(Germany) THW Kiel	41

Quarter-finals
Aug 28
(North Macedonia) RK Vardar	34
(Saudi Arabia) Al Mudhar	27
Aug 28
(Egypt) Zamalek SC	28
(Germany) THW Kiel	32
Aug 28
(Saudi Arabia) Al Wehda	30
(Brazil) Handebol Taubaté	26
Aug 28
(Spain) FC Barcelona	38
(Qatar) Al-Duhail SC	26

Semi-finals
Aug 29
(North Macedonia) RK Vardar	30
(Germany) THW Kiel	34
Aug 29
(Saudi Arabia) Al Wehda	24
(Spain) FC Barcelona	34

Final
Aug 31
(Germany) THW Kiel	32
(Spain) FC Barcelona	34
Third place
Aug 31
(North Macedonia) RK Vardar	30
(Saudi Arabia) Al Wehda	26

=== Quarterfinals qualification ===
27 August 2019; 16:15	Sydney University (Australia)	27–41	(Germany) THW Kiel	Ministry of Sports Hall, Dammam; Attendance: 600; Referees: Fonseca, Santos (POR)
27 August 2019; 16:15	Bouazar Kermani 6	(18–23)	Dahmke 9	Ministry of Sports Hall, Dammam; Attendance: 600; Referees: Fonseca, Santos (POR)
27 August 2019; 16:15	1× (yellow card) 2× (suspension)	Report	1× (yellow card) 2× (suspension)	Ministry of Sports Hall, Dammam; Attendance: 600; Referees: Fonseca, Santos (POR)

27 August 2019; 20:00	Al Mudhar (Saudi Arabia)	33–13	(United States) New York City THC	Ministry of Sports Hall, Dammam; Attendance: 2,500; Referees: Schulze, Tönnies (GER)
27 August 2019; 20:00	Zaïdi 6	(16–5)	Shalaby 4	Ministry of Sports Hall, Dammam; Attendance: 2,500; Referees: Schulze, Tönnies (GER)
27 August 2019; 20:00	1× (yellow card) 2× (suspension)	Report	1× (yellow card) 4× (suspension)	Ministry of Sports Hall, Dammam; Attendance: 2,500; Referees: Schulze, Tönnies (GER)

=== Quarterfinals ===
28 August 2019; 12:15	Al Wehda (Saudi Arabia)	30–26	(Brazil) Handebol Taubaté	Ministry of Sports Hall, Dammam; Attendance: 700; Referees: Kurtagic, Wetterwik (SWE)
28 August 2019; 12:15	Al-Salem, Hasan 7	(17–13)	Cândido, Soares 5	Ministry of Sports Hall, Dammam; Attendance: 700; Referees: Kurtagic, Wetterwik (SWE)
28 August 2019; 12:15	1× (yellow card) 3× (suspension)	Report	2× (yellow card) 1× (suspension)	Ministry of Sports Hall, Dammam; Attendance: 700; Referees: Kurtagic, Wetterwik (SWE)

28 August 2019; 14:30	Zamalek SC (Egypt)	28–32	(Germany) THW Kiel	Ministry of Sports Hall, Dammam; Attendance: 1,400; Referees: Gubica, Milošević (CRO)
28 August 2019; 14:30	El-Deraa, Saad 6	(12–18)	Bilyk, Ekberg 9	Ministry of Sports Hall, Dammam; Attendance: 1,400; Referees: Gubica, Milošević (CRO)
28 August 2019; 14:30	1× (yellow card) 2× (suspension)	Report	1× (yellow card)	Ministry of Sports Hall, Dammam; Attendance: 1,400; Referees: Gubica, Milošević (CRO)

28 August 2019; 17:20	FC Barcelona (Spain)	38–26	(Qatar) Al-Duhail SC	Ministry of Sports Hall, Dammam; Attendance: 900; Referees: Fonseca, Santos (POR)
28 August 2019; 17:20	Pascual 7	(17–10)	Maaref 6	Ministry of Sports Hall, Dammam; Attendance: 900; Referees: Fonseca, Santos (POR)
28 August 2019; 17:20	2× (yellow card) 5× (suspension)	Report	1× (yellow card) 6× (suspension)	Ministry of Sports Hall, Dammam; Attendance: 900; Referees: Fonseca, Santos (POR)

28 August 2019; 20:00	RK Vardar (North Macedonia)	34–27	(Saudi Arabia) Al Mudhar	Ministry of Sports Hall, Dammam; Attendance: 3,200; Referees: Horáček, Novotný (CZE)
28 August 2019; 20:00	Dibirov 7	(17–12)	Jaziri 6	Ministry of Sports Hall, Dammam; Attendance: 3,200; Referees: Horáček, Novotný (CZE)
28 August 2019; 20:00	1× (yellow card) 5× (suspension)	Report	5× (suspension)	Ministry of Sports Hall, Dammam; Attendance: 3,200; Referees: Horáček, Novotný (CZE)

=== Placement round 5–10 ===
==== Group A ====
Pos	Team	Pld	W	D	L	GF	GA	GD	Pts
1	(Brazil) Handebol Taubaté	2	2	0	0	66	49	+17	4
2	(Saudi Arabia) Al Mudhar	2	1	0	1	58	55	+3	2
3	(Australia) Sydney University	2	0	0	2	46	66	−20	0

Source: IHF
Rules for classification: 1) points; 2) head-to-head points; 3) head-to-head goal difference; 4) head-to-head number of goals scored; 5) goal difference.

29 August 2019; 12:15	Sydney University (Australia)	22–35	(Brazil) Handebol Taubaté	Ministry of Sports Hall, Dammam; Referees: Gubica, Milošević (CRO)
29 August 2019; 12:15	Andrusenko, Castro 4	(9–17)	Quost 7	Ministry of Sports Hall, Dammam; Referees: Gubica, Milošević (CRO)
29 August 2019; 12:15	3× (yellow card) 4× (suspension)	Report	1× (yellow card) 1× (suspension)	Ministry of Sports Hall, Dammam; Referees: Gubica, Milošević (CRO)

30 August 2019; 14:30	Al Mudhar (Saudi Arabia)	31–24	(Australia) Sydney University	Ministry of Sports Hall, Dammam; Attendance: 450; Referees: Horáček, Novotný (CZE)
30 August 2019; 14:30	Jaziri 9	(14–13)	Castro 6	Ministry of Sports Hall, Dammam; Attendance: 450; Referees: Horáček, Novotný (CZE)
30 August 2019; 14:30	1× (yellow card) 4× (suspension)	Report	5× (suspension)	Ministry of Sports Hall, Dammam; Attendance: 450; Referees: Horáček, Novotný (CZE)

31 August 2019; 10:00	Handebol Taubaté (Brazil)	31–27	(Saudi Arabia) Al Mudhar	Ministry of Sports Hall, Dammam; Attendance: 300; Referees: Kurtagic, Wetterwik (SWE)
31 August 2019; 10:00	Cánepa 8	(15–17)	Zaïdi 11	Ministry of Sports Hall, Dammam; Attendance: 300; Referees: Kurtagic, Wetterwik (SWE)
31 August 2019; 10:00	3× (yellow card) 6× (suspension)	Report	1× (yellow card) 4× (suspension)	Ministry of Sports Hall, Dammam; Attendance: 300; Referees: Kurtagic, Wetterwik (SWE)

==== Group B ====
Pos	Team	Pld	W	D	L	GF	GA	GD	Pts
1	(Egypt) Zamalek SC	2	2	0	0	71	50	+21	4
2	(Qatar) Al-Duhail SC	2	1	0	1	50	52	−2	2
3	(United States) New York City THC	2	0	0	2	43	62	−19	0

Source: IHF
Rules for classification: 1) points; 2) head-to-head points; 3) head-to-head goal difference; 4) head-to-head number of goals scored; 5) goal difference.

29 August 2019; 14:30	New York City THC (United States)	19–24	(Qatar) Al-Duhail SC	Ministry of Sports Hall, Dammam; Referees: Horáček, Novotný (CZE)
29 August 2019; 14:30	Lang 5	(8–11)	Maaref 7	Ministry of Sports Hall, Dammam; Referees: Horáček, Novotný (CZE)
29 August 2019; 14:30	1× (yellow card) 3× (suspension)	Report	4× (suspension)	Ministry of Sports Hall, Dammam; Referees: Horáček, Novotný (CZE)

30 August 2019; 16:30	Zamalek SC (Egypt)	38–24	(United States) New York City THC	Ministry of Sports Hall, Dammam; Attendance: 1,200; Referees: Fonseca, Santos (POR)
30 August 2019; 16:30	El-Ahmar 7	(19–15)	Pires 8	Ministry of Sports Hall, Dammam; Attendance: 1,200; Referees: Fonseca, Santos (POR)
30 August 2019; 16:30	1× (suspension)	Report	2× (yellow card) 5× (suspension)	Ministry of Sports Hall, Dammam; Attendance: 1,200; Referees: Fonseca, Santos (POR)

31 August 2019; 12:15	Al-Duhail SC (Qatar)	26–33	(Egypt) Zamalek SC	Ministry of Sports Hall, Dammam; Referees: Schulze, Tönnies (GER)
31 August 2019; 12:15	Maaref 6	(12–15)	El-Ahmar, El-Deraa 6	Ministry of Sports Hall, Dammam; Referees: Schulze, Tönnies (GER)
31 August 2019; 12:15	6× (suspension)	Report	2× (yellow card) 3× (suspension)	Ministry of Sports Hall, Dammam; Referees: Schulze, Tönnies (GER)

=== Semifinals ===
29 August 2019; 17:20	RK Vardar (North Macedonia)	30–34	(Germany) THW Kiel	Ministry of Sports Hall, Dammam; Referees: Kurtagic, Wetterwik (SWE)
29 August 2019; 17:20	three players 5	(17–19)	Bilyk 9	Ministry of Sports Hall, Dammam; Referees: Kurtagic, Wetterwik (SWE)
29 August 2019; 17:20	2× (yellow card) 3× (suspension)	Report	3× (yellow card) 5× (suspension)	Ministry of Sports Hall, Dammam; Referees: Kurtagic, Wetterwik (SWE)

29 August 2019; 20:00	Al Wehda (Saudi Arabia)	24–34	(Spain) FC Barcelona	Ministry of Sports Hall, Dammam; Attendance: 2,100; Referees: Schulze, Tönnies (GER)
29 August 2019; 20:00	Zein 9	(16–13)	Cindrić 7	Ministry of Sports Hall, Dammam; Attendance: 2,100; Referees: Schulze, Tönnies (GER)
29 August 2019; 20:00	2× (yellow card) 4× (suspension) 1× (red card)	Report	1× (yellow card) 4× (suspension)	Ministry of Sports Hall, Dammam; Attendance: 2,100; Referees: Schulze, Tönnies (GER)

=== Third place game ===
31 August 2019; 14:30	RK Vardar (North Macedonia)	30–26	(Saudi Arabia) Al Wehda	Ministry of Sports Hall, Dammam; Referees: Horáček, Novotný (CZE)
31 August 2019; 14:30	Čupić 7	(16–16)	Al-Salem 9	Ministry of Sports Hall, Dammam; Referees: Horáček, Novotný (CZE)
31 August 2019; 14:30	1× (yellow card) 4× (suspension)	Report	1× (yellow card) 4× (suspension)	Ministry of Sports Hall, Dammam; Referees: Horáček, Novotný (CZE)

=== Final ===
31 August 2019; 17:20	THW Kiel (Germany)	32–34	(Spain) FC Barcelona	Ministry of Sports Hall, Dammam; Referees: Gubica, Milošević (CRO)
31 August 2019; 17:20	Ekberg 7	(17–15)	Cindrić 11	Ministry of Sports Hall, Dammam; Referees: Gubica, Milošević (CRO)
31 August 2019; 17:20	3× (yellow card) 4× (suspension)	Report	3× (yellow card) 4× (suspension) 1× (red card)	Ministry of Sports Hall, Dammam; Referees: Gubica, Milošević (CRO)

== Final ranking ==
Rank	Team
1st place, gold medalist(s)	(Spain) FC Barcelona
2nd place, silver medalist(s)	(Germany) THW Kiel
3rd place, bronze medalist(s)	(North Macedonia) RK Vardar
4	(Saudi Arabia) Al Wehda
5	(Egypt) Zamalek SC
6	(Brazil) Handebol Taubaté
7	(Saudi Arabia) Al Mudhar
8	(Qatar) Al-Duhail SC
9	(United States) New York City THC
10	(Australia) Sydney University
