= Nikolaj Markussen =

Danish handball player (born 1988)

Personal information
- Full name: Nikolaj Rømer Berg Markussen
- Nationality: Danish
- Born: 1 August 1988 (age 38) Helsinge, Denmark
- Height: 2.12 m (6 ft 11 in)

Sport
- Sport: Handball
- Position: Left Back
- Current club: TTH Holstebro
- Number: 22

Senior clubs
- Years: Team
- 2009–2011: Nordsjælland Håndbold
- 2011–2013: Atlético Madrid BM
- 2013–2014: El Jaish SC
- 2014–2015: Skjern Håndbold
- 2015–2020: Bjerringbro-Silkeborg
- 2020–2021: Telekom Veszprém
- 2021–2026: TTH Holstebro
National team
Years	Team	Apps	(Gls)
2010–2026	Denmark	68	(142)
Medal record
Men's handball
Representing Denmark
World Championship
Gold medal – first place	2019 Germany/Denmark
Silver medal – second place	2013 Spain
European Championships
Gold medal – first place	2012 Serbia
Junior World Championship
Silver medal – second place	2009 Egypt
- Updated on 07 November 2025

Nikolaj Markussen (born 1 August 1988) is a Danish handballer for TTH Holstebro and the Danish national team.

He was part of the Danish team that won the 2019 World Championship, the first time Denmark ever won the title. He is also a European champion with the national team, after winning the 2012 Championship in Serbia, defeating the host nation in the final, 21–19.

== Clubs ==
On 19 February, Markussen signed a two-year deal with Bjerringbro-Silkeborg, starting in the 2015–2016 season.

== Honours ==
- Danish Championship:
  - Gold: 2016
