= David Davis (handballer) =

Spanish handball coach (born 1976)

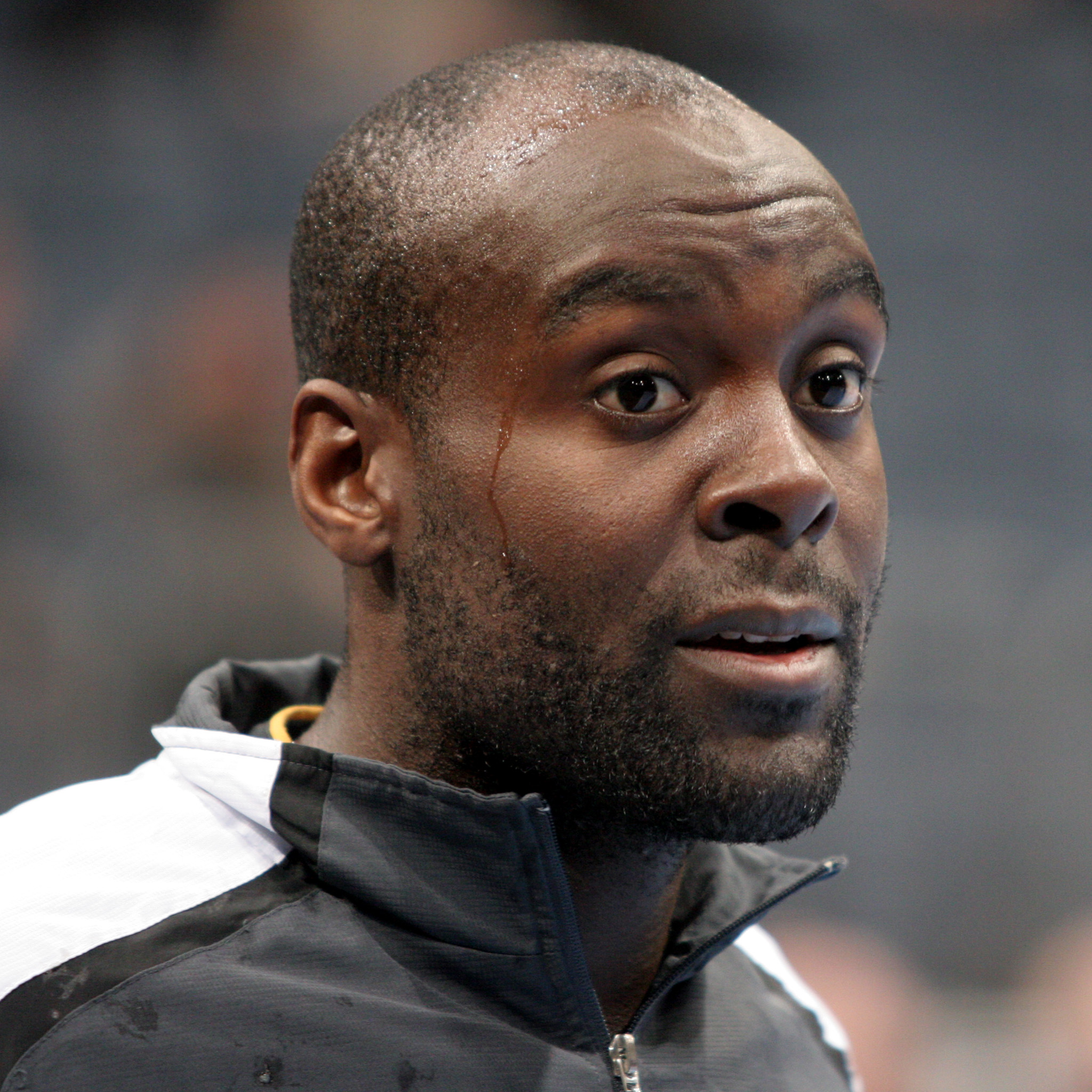
- Davis in 2008

Personal information
- Full name: David Davis Cámara
- Nationality: Spanish
- Born: 25 October 1976 (age 49) Barcelona, Spain
- Height: 1.85 m (6 ft 1 in)

Sport
- Sport: Handball
- Position: Wing
- Current club: Al Ahly

Senior clubs
- Years: Team
- –1995: BM Granollers
- 1995–1996: CB Naranco Oviedo
- 1996–1997: SD Teucro
- 1997–1999: BM Altea
- 1999–2005: BM Valladolid
- 2005–2011: BM Ciudad Real
- 2011–2013: Bm. At. Madrid
- 2013: FC Porto
National team
- Years: Team
- –: Spain

Teams managed
- 2014–2018: RK Vardar (assistant)
- 2016–2017: ŽRK Vardar
- 2017–2018: Russia (assistant)
- 2018–2019: Egypt
- 2018–2021: Telekom Veszprém
- 2022: RK Vardar 1961
- 2022–2024: Al Ahly
- 2024–2025: Dinamo București
- 2025–: Al Ahly
Medal record
Men's handball
Representing Spain
Olympic Games
Bronze medal – third place	2008 Beijing	Team
World Championship
Gold medal – first place	2005 Tunisia	Team
European Championship
Silver medal – second place	2006 Switzerland	Team

David Davis Cámara (Note: In this Spanish name, the first or paternal surname is Davis and the second or maternal family name is Cámara.) (born 25 October 1976) is a Spanish handball coach and former player. He was born in Barcelona and raised in Santa Maria de Palautordera by Equatorial Guinean Bubi parents from Malabo. He played as a left winger.

== Coaching career ==
His last team was FC Porto in 2013. In 2014 he became assistant coach in RK Vardar from Skopje, Macedonia.

In 2016 he was appointed head coach of ŽRK Vardar.

In 2014, he transitioned to coaching, joining the coaching staff of RK Vardar together with Raúl González, with whom he won the EHF Champions League in 2017. They again qualified for the EHFCL Final4 in 2018. In the summer of 2018, he began coaching the Egyptian national team, with whom he competed at the 2019 World Cup in Denmark, achieving eighth place six months later.

In October 2018 he took over Telekom Veszprém. In a very complicated season, he managed to recover the team until they became champions of the Hungarian League and the SEHA League, while they managed to reach the Champions League final. The Egyptian Federation then demanded exclusivity from Davis for its project and, faced with the ultimatum, the Spaniard decided to continue as head of Telekom Veszprém. During the pandemic, in the 2019/2020 season and after the cancellation of the national competitions, the team once again earned a place in the Final4. In 2021, after losing in the quarterfinals against Nantes and lifting the Hungarian Cup, Davis was fired by the club.

In January 2022, the Spanish coach returned to Skopje to manage RK Vardar, which at this point in the season closes its Champions League group and barely stays alive in the national competition. The team managed to get through the difficult group stage, after which they were knocked out by Telekom Veszprém (after starting a draw with Balaton). Despite numerous injuries and financial difficulties, the Macedonians are proclaimed champions of the League and Cup. The sanction of the EHF that prevents RK Vardar from playing in European competitions separated their paths.

In 2025 he re-joined Al Ahly.

== Records with national team ==
- World Championship: 1
  - 2005 – Túnez
- European Men's Handball Championship:1
  - 2006 – Switzerland/ silver medal
- Gold medal Mediterranean Games 2005
- Silver medal European Championship 2006
- Gold medal Youth European Championship 1994
- Campeón España Junior 1995/1996.
- Campeón de España Junior 1994/1995.
- 4 Campeonatos de España en Categ. Inferiores

== Records with clubs ==
- 3 European Handball Championship 2005–2006, 2007–2008, 2008–2009
- 4 ASOBAL League 2006–2007 2007–2008, 2008–2009, 2009–2010.
- 5 King's Cup 2004–2005, 2007–2008, 2010–2011, 2011–2012, 2012–13.
- 3 Supercup of Spain 2007–2008, 2009–2010, 2011–12.
- 5 ASOBAL Cup 2002–2003, 2005–2006, 2006–2007, 2007–2008, 2010–2011.
- 1 EHF Cup 1994–1995.
- 3 European Handball Supercup 2005–2006, 2006–2007, 2008–2009.
- 3 IHF Super Globe 2006–2007, 2009–2010, 2012–2013.
- Runner up ASOBAL League 2005–06, 2010–11, 2011–12, 2012–13.
- Runner up Kings Cup 1999–2000, 2008–2009.
- Runner up Spain Handball Supercup 2008–2009, 2012–13.
- Runner up ASOBAL Cup 2012–13.
- Runner up Europe Cup 2011–12.
- Runner up EHF Cup Winners' Cup 2003–2004.
- Runner up EHF City Cup 1999–2000.
