= Mohamed Abd El-Salam =

Egyptian handball player

Personal information
- Full name: Mohamed Ibrahim Abd El-Salam
- Nationality: Egyptian
- Born: 12 January 1982 (age 43)
- Height: 1.92 m (6 ft 4 in)
- Weight: 83 kg (183 lb)

Sport
- Sport: Handball

Mohamed Ibrahim Abd El-Salam (Arabic: محمد ابراهيم عبد السلام, born 12 January 1982) is an Egyptian handball player. He competed in the 2004 and 2008 Summer Olympics.
