= Mohamed Jilani Maaref =

Tunisian handball player

Personal information
- Nationality: Tunisian
- Born: 27 October 1991 (age 34) Mahdia
- Height: 1.92 m (6 ft 4 in)

Sport
- Sport: Handball
- Position: Left back
- Current club: Club Africain
- Number: 19

Senior clubs
- Years: Team
- 2010–2012: El Makarem de Mahdia
- 2012–2017: Club Africain
- 2017–2024: Al-Ahli
- 2024–: Club Africain
National team
Years	Team	Apps	(Gls)
2012–	Tunisia	22	(22)

Mohamed Jilani Maaref (born 27 October 1991) is a Tunisian handball player for Club Africain and the Tunisian national team.

He participated on the Tunisia men's national handball team at the 2016 Summer Olympics in Rio de Janeiro, in the men's handball tournament.
