= Joan Cañellas =

Spanish handball player (born 1986)

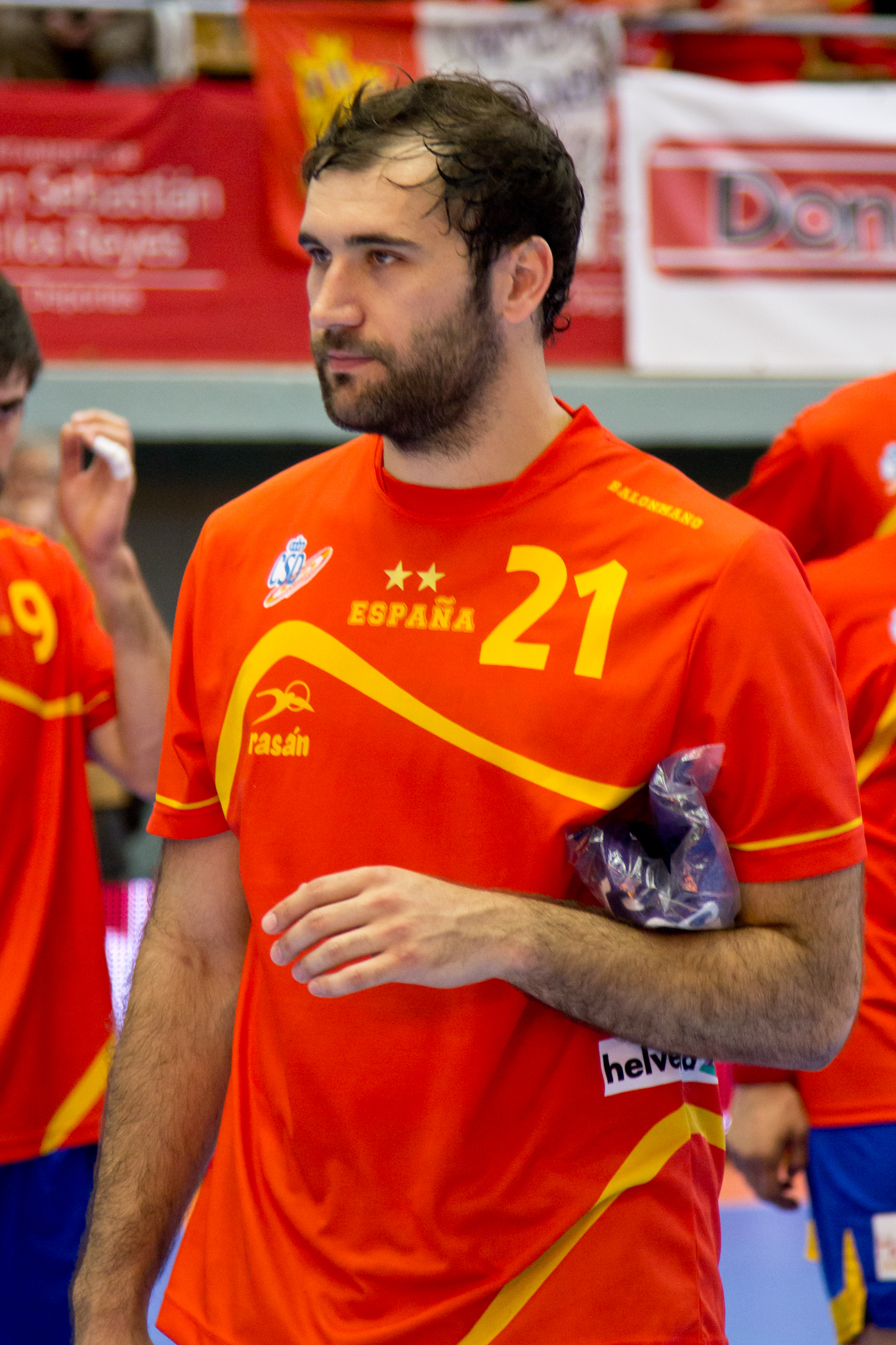
- Cañellas with Spain in 2013

Personal information
- Full name: Joan Cañellas Reixach
- Nationality: Spanish
- Born: 30 September 1986 (age 40) Santa Maria de Palautordera, Spain
- Height: 1.98 m (6 ft 6 in)

Sport
- Sport: Handball
- Position: Left back

Senior clubs
- Years: Team
- 2004–2005: BM Granollers
- 2005–2008: FC Barcelona
- 2008–2009: BM Granollers
- 2009–2011: BM Ciudad Real
- 2011–2013: Atlético Madrid
- 2013–2014: HSV Hamburg
- 2014–2016: THW Kiel
- 2016–2018: RK Vardar
- 2018–2021: SC Pick Szeged
- 2021–2024: Kadetten Schaffhausen
National team
Years	Team	Apps	(Gls)
2008–2024	Spain	237	(570)
Medal record
World Championship
Gold medal – first place	2013 Spain
Bronze medal – third place	2011 Sweden
Bronze medal – third place	2021 Egypt
Bronze medal – third place	2023 Poland/Sweden
European Championship
Gold medal – first place	2018 Croatia
Gold medal – first place	2020 Sweden/Austria/Norway
Silver medal – second place	2016 Poland
Silver medal – second place	2022 Hungary/Slovakia
Bronze medal – third place	2014 Denmark

Joan Cañellas Reixach (born 30 September 1986) is a Spanish former handball player. He is a world Champion from the 2013 World Championship where he was the top scorer in the final against Denmark.

Cañellas scored 50 goals for Spain at the 2014 European Championship in Denmark. He was the tournament's top scorer.

While playing in Madrid, he also studied pharmacy at University of Barcelona and Universidad Complutense de Madrid. Joan is a member of a pharmacist dynasty, six of his family members are pharmacists.

== Honours and awards ==
=== F.C.Barcelona ===
- Spanish League: 2005–06
- Spanish Cup: 2007
- Spanish Supercup: 2007

=== BM. Ciudad Real ===
- Spanish League: 2009–2010
- Spanish Cup: 2010
- Super Globe: 2010
- Asobal Cup: 2010
- Spanish Supercup: 2010
- EHF Champions League Finalist: 2010–11

=== BM. Atletico de Madrid ===
- Super Globe: 2012
- Spanish SuperCup: 2011
- Spanish Cup: 2011, 2012
- EHF Champions League Finalist: 2011–12

=== THW Kiel ===
- Handball-Bundesliga: 2014–2015
- DHB-Supercup: 2015, 2016

=== Vardar Skopje ===
- EHF Champions League Winner: 2016–17
- Macedonian Handball Super League: 2016–17, 2017–18
- Macedonian Handball Cup: 2016, 2017
- SEHA League: 2016, 2017
- Macedonian Handball Super Cup: 2017

=== MOL-Pick Szeged ===
- Magyar Kézilabdakupa: 2018–2019
- Magyar Kézilabdaliga: 2020–2021

=== Kadetten Schaffhausen ===
- Swiss Handball League: 2021-22, 2022–23, 2023–24
- Swiss Men's Handball Cup: 2024

=== Individual ===
- MVP of the SEHA League Final Four: 2017
