= 2012 IHF Super Globe =

Tournament details
- Host country: Qatar
- Venue(s): 1 (in 1 host city)
- Dates: August 27 – September 1
- Teams: 8 (from 5 confederations)

Final positions
- Champions: (Spain) Atlético Madrid (1st title)
- Runner-up: (Germany) THW Kiel
- Third place: (Qatar) Al Sadd
- Fourth place: (Egypt) Zamalek SC

Tournament statistics
- Matches played: 20
- Goals scored: 1,159 (57.95 per match)
- Attendance: 14,900 (745 per match)
- Top scorer(s): (Tunisia) Amine Bannour (42 goals)

Awards
- Best player: (Slovenia) Dragan Gajić

The 2012 IHF Super Globe was the sixth edition. It was held in Doha, Qatar at the Al-Gharafa Sports Club Hall from August 27 – September 1, 2012.

The teams that took part were the respective continental champions.

Atlético Madrid defeated THW Kiel in an all-European final 28–23.

== Teams ==
Group A	Group B
(Spain) Atlético Madrid (Egypt) Zamalek SC (Brazil) Metodista São Bernardo (Qatar) El Jaish SC	(Germany) THW Kiel (Saudi Arabia) Mudhar Club (Qatar) Al Sadd (Australia) Sydney University

== Preliminary round ==
The draw was held on June 23, 2012. The scheduled was published on June 29, 2012.

Legend
Qualified for the semifinals

All times are local (UTC+3)

=== Group A ===
Team	Pld	W	D	L	GF	GA	GD	Pts
(Spain) Atlético Madrid	3	3	0	0	91	75	+16	6
(Egypt) Zamalek SC	3	2	0	1	85	77	+8	4
(Qatar) El Jaish SC	3	1	0	2	77	82	−5	2
(Brazil) Metodista São Bernardo	3	0	0	3	78	97	−19	0

27 August 2012; 15:00	Zamalek SC (Egypt)	33–24	(Brazil) Metodista São Bernardo	Al-Gharafa Sports Club Hall, Doha; Attendance: 500; Referees: Al-Suwaidi, Bamutref (QAT)
27 August 2012; 15:00	Zaki 7	(12–14)	Castillo 6	Al-Gharafa Sports Club Hall, Doha; Attendance: 500; Referees: Al-Suwaidi, Bamutref (QAT)
27 August 2012; 15:00	3× (yellow card) 3× (suspension)	Report	3× (yellow card) 5× (suspension)	Al-Gharafa Sports Club Hall, Doha; Attendance: 500; Referees: Al-Suwaidi, Bamutref (QAT)

27 August 2012; 17:00	Atlético Madrid (Spain)	28–23	(Qatar) El Jaish SC	Al-Gharafa Sports Club Hall, Doha; Attendance: 1,000; Referees: Gatelis, Mazeika (LTU)
27 August 2012; 17:00	Lazarov 7	(11–13)	Dolenec 6	Al-Gharafa Sports Club Hall, Doha; Attendance: 1,000; Referees: Gatelis, Mazeika (LTU)
27 August 2012; 17:00	2× (yellow card) 1× (suspension)	Report	3× (yellow card) 5× (suspension)	Al-Gharafa Sports Club Hall, Doha; Attendance: 1,000; Referees: Gatelis, Mazeika (LTU)

28 August 2012; 14:00	Metodista São Bernardo (Brazil)	27–34	(Spain) Atlético Madrid	Al-Gharafa Sports Club Hall, Doha; Attendance: 300; Referees: Leifsson, Palsson (ISL)
28 August 2012; 14:00	Castillo 6	(16–16)	Jurkiewicz 6	Al-Gharafa Sports Club Hall, Doha; Attendance: 300; Referees: Leifsson, Palsson (ISL)
28 August 2012; 14:00	3× (yellow card) 3× (suspension)	Report	3× (yellow card) 3× (suspension)	Al-Gharafa Sports Club Hall, Doha; Attendance: 300; Referees: Leifsson, Palsson (ISL)

28 August 2012; 20:00	El Jaish SC (Qatar)	24–27	(Egypt) Zamalek SC	Al-Gharafa Sports Club Hall, Doha; Attendance: 500; Referees: Al Mutawa, Al Suwailam (KUW)
28 August 2012; 20:00	Horvat 7	(12–12)	Zaki, Sanad 6	Al-Gharafa Sports Club Hall, Doha; Attendance: 500; Referees: Al Mutawa, Al Suwailam (KUW)
28 August 2012; 20:00	3× (yellow card) 3× (suspension)	Report	4× (yellow card)	Al-Gharafa Sports Club Hall, Doha; Attendance: 500; Referees: Al Mutawa, Al Suwailam (KUW)

29 August 2012; 16:00	Atlético Madrid (Spain)	29–25	(Egypt) Zamalek SC	Al-Gharafa Sports Club Hall, Doha; Attendance: 500; Referees: Al Suwaidi, Bamutref (QAT)
29 August 2012; 16:00	Lazarov 7	(12–15)	Al Ahmr 11	Al-Gharafa Sports Club Hall, Doha; Attendance: 500; Referees: Al Suwaidi, Bamutref (QAT)
29 August 2012; 16:00	3× (yellow card) 2× (suspension)	Report	3× (yellow card) 6× (suspension)	Al-Gharafa Sports Club Hall, Doha; Attendance: 500; Referees: Al Suwaidi, Bamutref (QAT)

29 August 2012; 20:00	El Jaish SC (Qatar)	30–27	(Brazil) Metodista São Bernardo	Al-Gharafa Sports Club Hall, Doha; Attendance: 1,000; Referees: Gatelis, Mazeika (LTU)
29 August 2012; 20:00	Manojlović 7	(15–13)	Chiuffa 11	Al-Gharafa Sports Club Hall, Doha; Attendance: 1,000; Referees: Gatelis, Mazeika (LTU)
29 August 2012; 20:00	3× (yellow card) 4× (suspension)	Report	1× (yellow card) 2× (suspension)	Al-Gharafa Sports Club Hall, Doha; Attendance: 1,000; Referees: Gatelis, Mazeika (LTU)

=== Group B ===
Team	Pld	W	D	L	GF	GA	GD	Pts
(Germany) THW Kiel	3	3	0	0	111	70	+41	6
(Qatar) Al Sadd	3	2	0	1	94	85	+9	4
(Saudi Arabia) Mudhar Club	3	1	0	2	94	103	−9	2
(Australia) Sydney University	3	0	0	3	65	106	−41	0

27 August 2012; 13:00	Mudhar Club (Saudi Arabia)	32–27	(Australia) Sydney University	Al-Gharafa Sports Club Hall, Doha; Referees: Al-Mutawa, Al-Suwailam (KUW)
27 August 2012; 13:00	Bannour 7	(15–12)	Liamazares 8	Al-Gharafa Sports Club Hall, Doha; Referees: Al-Mutawa, Al-Suwailam (KUW)
27 August 2012; 13:00	3× (yellow card) 6× (suspension)	Report	2× (yellow card) 3× (suspension)	Al-Gharafa Sports Club Hall, Doha; Referees: Al-Mutawa, Al-Suwailam (KUW)

27 August 2012; 19:45	THW Kiel (Germany)	29–26	(Qatar) Al Sadd	Al-Gharafa Sports Club Hall, Doha; Attendance: 1,000; Referees: Leifsonn, Palsonn (ISL)
27 August 2012; 19:45	Vujin 7	(9–16)	Gajić 8	Al-Gharafa Sports Club Hall, Doha; Attendance: 1,000; Referees: Leifsonn, Palsonn (ISL)
27 August 2012; 19:45	3× (yellow card) 1× (suspension)	Report	3× (yellow card) 3× (suspension)	Al-Gharafa Sports Club Hall, Doha; Attendance: 1,000; Referees: Leifsonn, Palsonn (ISL)

28 August 2012; 16:00	Sydney University (Australia)	13–40	(Germany) THW Kiel	Al-Gharafa Sports Club Hall, Doha; Attendance: 300; Referees: Akpatsa, Assignon (TOG)
28 August 2012; 16:00	Szklarski 5	(7–21)	Hansen 8	Al-Gharafa Sports Club Hall, Doha; Attendance: 300; Referees: Akpatsa, Assignon (TOG)
28 August 2012; 16:00	2× (yellow card) 2× (suspension)	Report	3× (yellow card) 2× (suspension)	Al-Gharafa Sports Club Hall, Doha; Attendance: 300; Referees: Akpatsa, Assignon (TOG)

28 August 2012; 18:00	Al Sadd (Qatar)	34–31	(Saudi Arabia) Mudhar Club	Al-Gharafa Sports Club Hall, Doha; Attendance: 1,000; Referees: Mazeika, Gutelis (LTU)
28 August 2012; 18:00	Gajić 10	(15–17)	Jallouz 8	Al-Gharafa Sports Club Hall, Doha; Attendance: 1,000; Referees: Mazeika, Gutelis (LTU)
28 August 2012; 18:00	2× (yellow card) 7× (suspension)	Report	3× (yellow card) 7× (suspension)	Al-Gharafa Sports Club Hall, Doha; Attendance: 1,000; Referees: Mazeika, Gutelis (LTU)

29 August 2012; 14:00	THW Kiel (Germany)	42–31	(Saudi Arabia) Mudhar Club	Al-Gharafa Sports Club Hall, Doha; Attendance: 400; Referees: Al Mutawa, Al Suwailam (KUW)
29 August 2012; 14:00	Sigurðsson 8	(20–14)	Jallouz 8	Al-Gharafa Sports Club Hall, Doha; Attendance: 400; Referees: Al Mutawa, Al Suwailam (KUW)
29 August 2012; 14:00	3× (yellow card) 1× (suspension)	Report	3× (yellow card) 1× (suspension)	Al-Gharafa Sports Club Hall, Doha; Attendance: 400; Referees: Al Mutawa, Al Suwailam (KUW)

29 August 2012; 18:00	Al Sadd (Qatar)	34–25	(Australia) Sydney University	Al-Gharafa Sports Club Hall, Doha; Attendance: 800; Referees: Akpatsa, Assignon (TOG)
29 August 2012; 18:00	Gajić 7	(17–10)	Liamazares 5	Al-Gharafa Sports Club Hall, Doha; Attendance: 800; Referees: Akpatsa, Assignon (TOG)
29 August 2012; 18:00	3× (yellow card) 1× (suspension)	Report	3× (yellow card) 4× (suspension)	Al-Gharafa Sports Club Hall, Doha; Attendance: 800; Referees: Akpatsa, Assignon (TOG)

== Knockout stage ==
=== Championship bracket ===
Semi-finals
31 August 2012
(Spain) Atlético Madrid	33
(Qatar) Al Sadd	32
31 August 2012
(Egypt) Zamalek SC	24
(Germany) THW Kiel	34

Final
1 September 2012
(Spain) Atlético Madrid	28
(Germany) THW Kiel	23
Third place
1 September 2012
(Qatar) Al Sadd	32
(Egypt) Zamalek SC	26

==== Semifinals ====
31 August 2012; 18:30	Al Sadd (Qatar)	32–33	(Spain) Atlético Madrid	Al-Gharafa Sports Club Hall, Doha; Attendance: 1,000; Referees: Gatelis, Mazeika (LTU)
31 August 2012; 18:30	Tej 7	(19–18)	Lazarov 7	Al-Gharafa Sports Club Hall, Doha; Attendance: 1,000; Referees: Gatelis, Mazeika (LTU)
31 August 2012; 18:30	3× (yellow card) 5× (suspension)	Report	3× (yellow card) 6× (suspension)	Al-Gharafa Sports Club Hall, Doha; Attendance: 1,000; Referees: Gatelis, Mazeika (LTU)

31 August 2012; 20:30	THW Kiel (Germany)	34–24	(Egypt) Zamalek SC	Al-Gharafa Sports Club Hall, Doha; Attendance: 1,000; Referees: Palsson, Leifsson (ISL)
31 August 2012; 20:30	Wiencek 6	(16–12)	Zaki 8	Al-Gharafa Sports Club Hall, Doha; Attendance: 1,000; Referees: Palsson, Leifsson (ISL)
31 August 2012; 20:30	3× (yellow card) 2× (suspension)	Report	3× (yellow card) 1× (suspension)	Al-Gharafa Sports Club Hall, Doha; Attendance: 1,000; Referees: Palsson, Leifsson (ISL)

==== Third place game ====
1 September 2012; 15:00	Al Sadd (Qatar)	32–26	(Egypt) Zamalek SC	Al-Gharafa Sports Club Hall, Doha; Attendance: 1,200; Referees: Leifsson, Palsson (ISL)
1 September 2012; 15:00	Gajić 9	(16–11)	Al Ahmr 10	Al-Gharafa Sports Club Hall, Doha; Attendance: 1,200; Referees: Leifsson, Palsson (ISL)
1 September 2012; 15:00	3× (yellow card) 5× (suspension)	Report	3× (yellow card) 6× (suspension)	Al-Gharafa Sports Club Hall, Doha; Attendance: 1,200; Referees: Leifsson, Palsson (ISL)

==== Final ====
1 September 2012; 17:00	Atlético Madrid (Spain)	28–23	(Germany) THW Kiel	Al-Gharafa Sports Club Hall, Doha; Attendance: 2,000; Referees: Al Suwaidi, Bamutref (QAT)
1 September 2012; 17:00	Jurkiewicz 5	(13–13)	Jícha 7	Al-Gharafa Sports Club Hall, Doha; Attendance: 2,000; Referees: Al Suwaidi, Bamutref (QAT)
1 September 2012; 17:00	4× (yellow card) 5× (suspension)	Report	4× (yellow card) 5× (suspension)	Al-Gharafa Sports Club Hall, Doha; Attendance: 2,000; Referees: Al Suwaidi, Bamutref (QAT)

=== 5–8th place bracket ===
5–8th semifinals
31 August 2012
(Saudi Arabia) Mudhar Club	31
(Brazil) Metodista São Bernardo	34
31 August 2012
(Australia) Sydney University	25
(Qatar) El Jaish SC	33

Fifth place
1 September 2012
(Brazil) Metodista São Bernardo	23
(Qatar) El Jaish SC	31
Seventh place
1 September 2012
(Saudi Arabia) Mudhar Club	34
(Australia) Sydney University	21

==== Semifinals ====
31 August 2012; 14:30	Metodista São Bernardo (Brazil)	34–31	(Saudi Arabia) Mudhar Club	Al-Gharafa Sports Club Hall, Doha; Attendance: 500; Referees: Al Suwaidi, Bamutref (QAT)
31 August 2012; 14:30	Castillo, Freitas 7	(21–15)	Bannour 13	Al-Gharafa Sports Club Hall, Doha; Attendance: 500; Referees: Al Suwaidi, Bamutref (QAT)
31 August 2012; 14:30	3× (yellow card) 3× (suspension) 1× (red card)	Report	3× (yellow card) 3× (suspension)	Al-Gharafa Sports Club Hall, Doha; Attendance: 500; Referees: Al Suwaidi, Bamutref (QAT)

31 August 2012; 16:30	El Jaish SC (Qatar)	33–25	(Australia) Sydney University	Al-Gharafa Sports Club Hall, Doha; Attendance: 700; Referees: Al Mutawa, Al Suwailam (KUW)
31 August 2012; 16:30	Kehdher 9	(18–9)	Pasquero, Szklarski 5	Al-Gharafa Sports Club Hall, Doha; Attendance: 700; Referees: Al Mutawa, Al Suwailam (KUW)
31 August 2012; 16:30	3× (yellow card) 1× (suspension)	Report	2× (yellow card) 4× (suspension)	Al-Gharafa Sports Club Hall, Doha; Attendance: 700; Referees: Al Mutawa, Al Suwailam (KUW)

==== Seventh place game ====
1 September 2012; 11:00	Mudhar Club (Saudi Arabia)	34–21	(Australia) Sydney University	Al-Gharafa Sports Club Hall, Doha; Attendance: 500; Referees: Akpatsa, Assignon (TOG)
1 September 2012; 11:00	Bannour 14	(17–11)	Szklarski 8	Al-Gharafa Sports Club Hall, Doha; Attendance: 500; Referees: Akpatsa, Assignon (TOG)
1 September 2012; 11:00	2× (yellow card) 3× (suspension)	Report	3× (yellow card) 3× (suspension)	Al-Gharafa Sports Club Hall, Doha; Attendance: 500; Referees: Akpatsa, Assignon (TOG)

==== Fifth place game ====
1 September 2012; 13:00	Metodista São Bernardo (Brazil)	23–31	(Qatar) El Jaish SC	Al-Gharafa Sports Club Hall, Doha; Attendance: 700; Referees: Al Mutawa, Al Suwailam (KUW)
1 September 2012; 13:00	Cruz 7	(13–15)	Khedher 5	Al-Gharafa Sports Club Hall, Doha; Attendance: 700; Referees: Al Mutawa, Al Suwailam (KUW)
1 September 2012; 13:00	2× (yellow card) 2× (suspension)	Report	3× (yellow card) 3× (suspension)	Al-Gharafa Sports Club Hall, Doha; Attendance: 700; Referees: Al Mutawa, Al Suwailam (KUW)

== Final ranking ==
1	(Spain) Atlético Madrid
2	(Germany) THW Kiel
3	(Qatar) Al Sadd
4	(Egypt) Zamalek SC
5	(Qatar) El Jaish SC
6	(Brazil) Metodista São Bernardo
7	(Saudi Arabia) Mudhar Club
8	(Australia) Sydney University
