= Niko Mindegía =

Spanish handball player (born 1988)

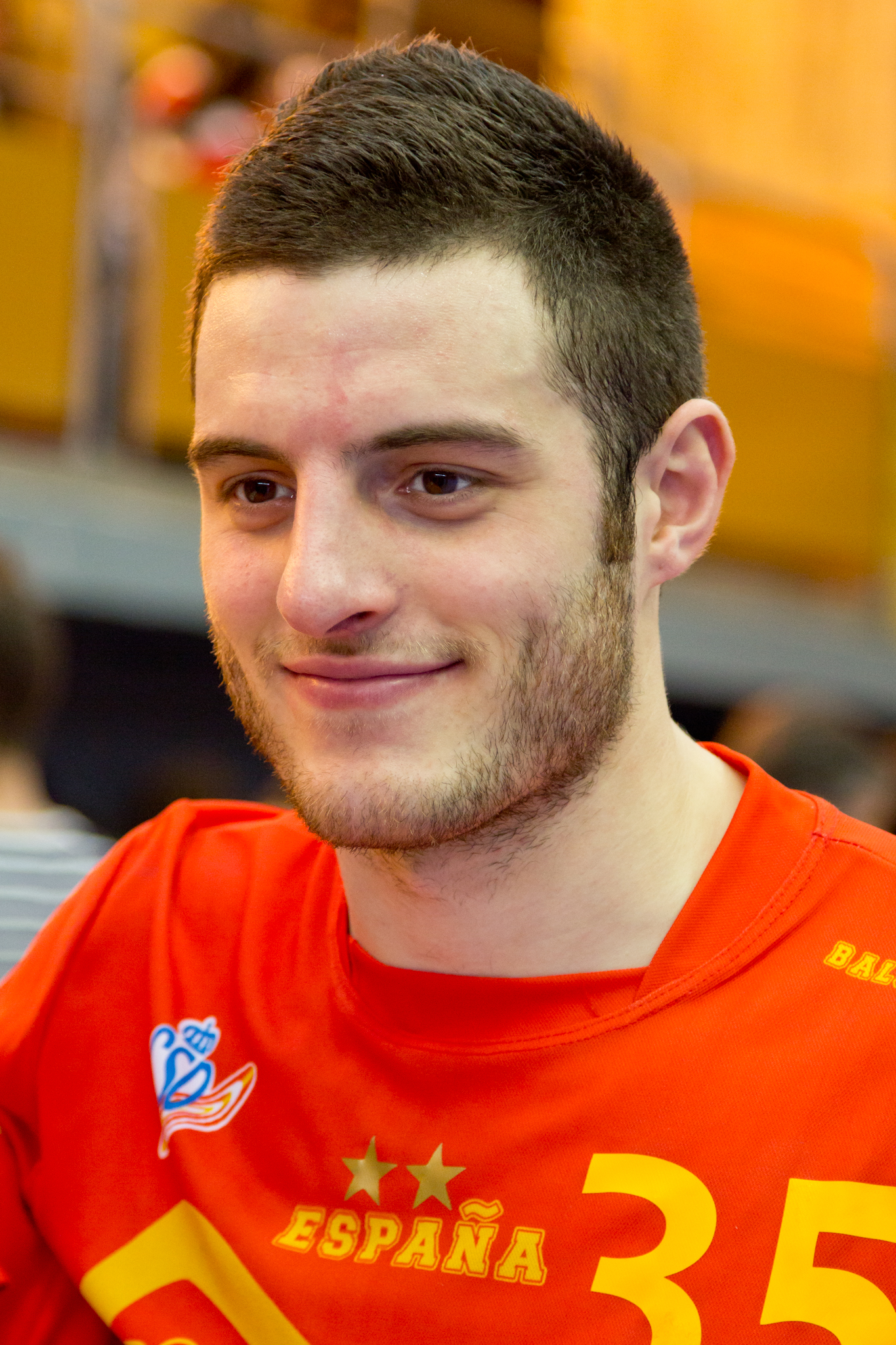
- Mindegía in 2013

Personal information
- Nationality: Spanish
- Born: 19 July 1988 (age 38) Doneztebe/Santesteban, Spain
- Height: 1.84 m (6 ft 0 in)

Sport
- Sport: Handball
- Position: Centre back
- Current club: Wisła Płock
- Number: 55

Senior clubs
- Years: Team
- 2005–2012: SDC San Antonio
- 2007–2008: → SCDR Anaitasuna (loan)
- 2012–2013: Naturhouse La Rioja
- 2013–2016: SC Pick Szeged
- 2016–2017: KIF Kolding København
- 2017–2019: Chambéry SMB HB
- 2019–2024: Wisła Płock
- 2024–: Fenix Toulouse
National team
Years	Team	Apps	(Gls)
2014–	Spain	23	(31)
Medal record
European Championship
Silver medal – second place	2016 Poland

Niko Mindegía Elizaga (born 19 July 1988) is a Spanish handball player who plays for Wisła Płock and the Spanish national team.

He competed at the 2016 European Men's Handball Championship.
