= Mariusz Jurkiewicz =

Polish handball player (born 1982)

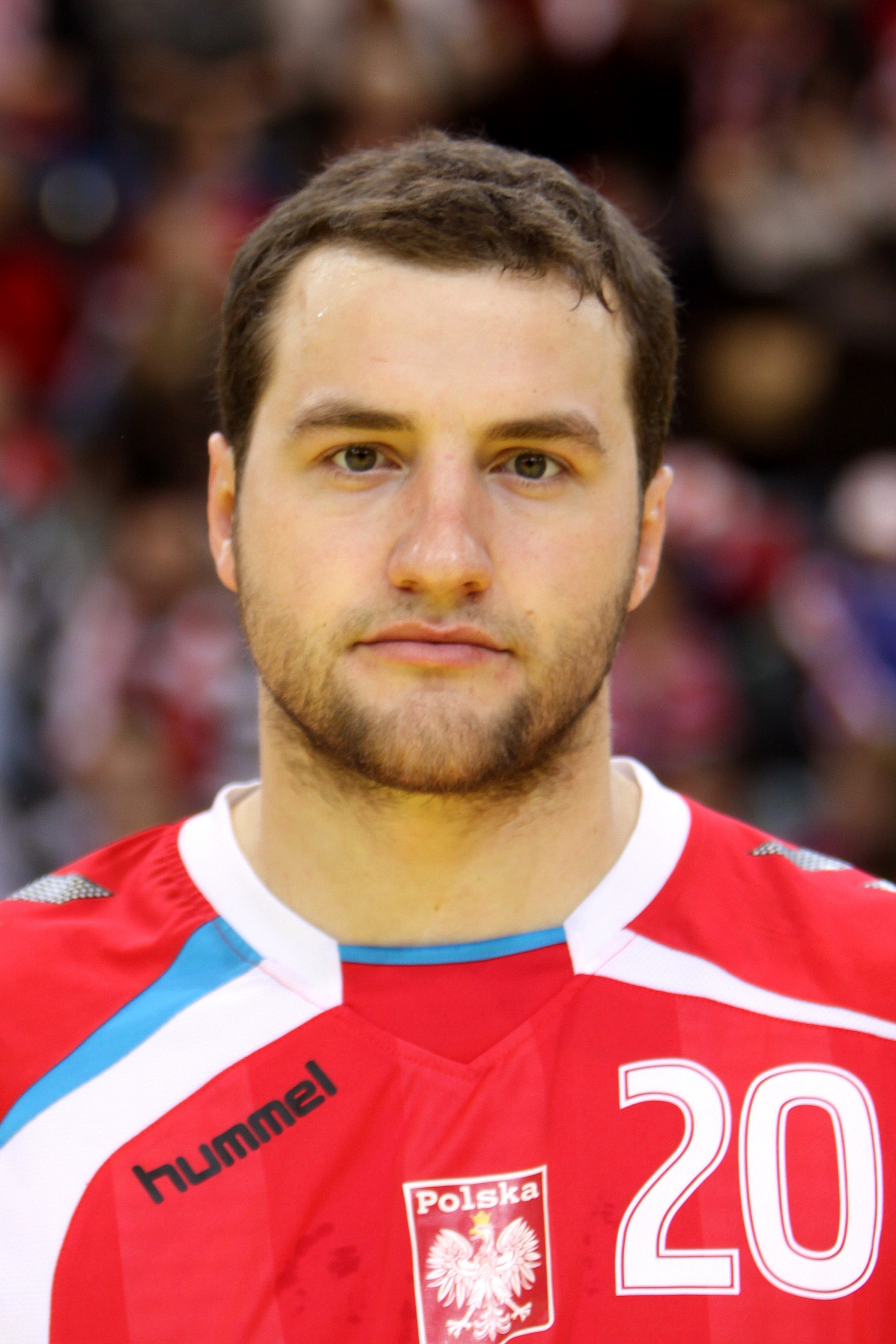

Personal information
- Full name: Mariusz Longin Jurkiewicz
- Nationality: Polish
- Born: 3 February 1982 (age 44) Lubin, Poland
- Height: 1.98 m (6 ft 6 in)

Sport
- Sport: Handball
- Position: Left Back/Central Back

Senior clubs
- Years: Team
- –2003: Zagłębie Lubin
- 2003–2004: Ciudad Real
- 2004–2009: JD Arrate
- 2009–2010: SDC San Antonio
- 2010–2011: Ciudad Real
- 2011–2013: Atlético Madrid
- 2013–2015: Wisła Płock
- 2015–2020: Vive Kielce
National team
Years	Team	Apps	(Gls)
2002–2017	Poland	163	(278)

Teams managed
- 2021–: Wybrzeże Gdańsk
Medal record
World Championship
Bronze medal – third place	2009 Croatia
Bronze medal – third place	2015 Qatar

Mariusz Jurkiewicz (born 3 February 1982) is a former Polish handball player who last played for PGE Vive Kielce.

He participated at the 2016 Summer Olympics in Rio de Janeiro, in the men's handball tournament.

== State awards ==
- 2015 Silver Cross of Merit
