= Julen Aguinagalde =

Spanish handball player (born 1982)

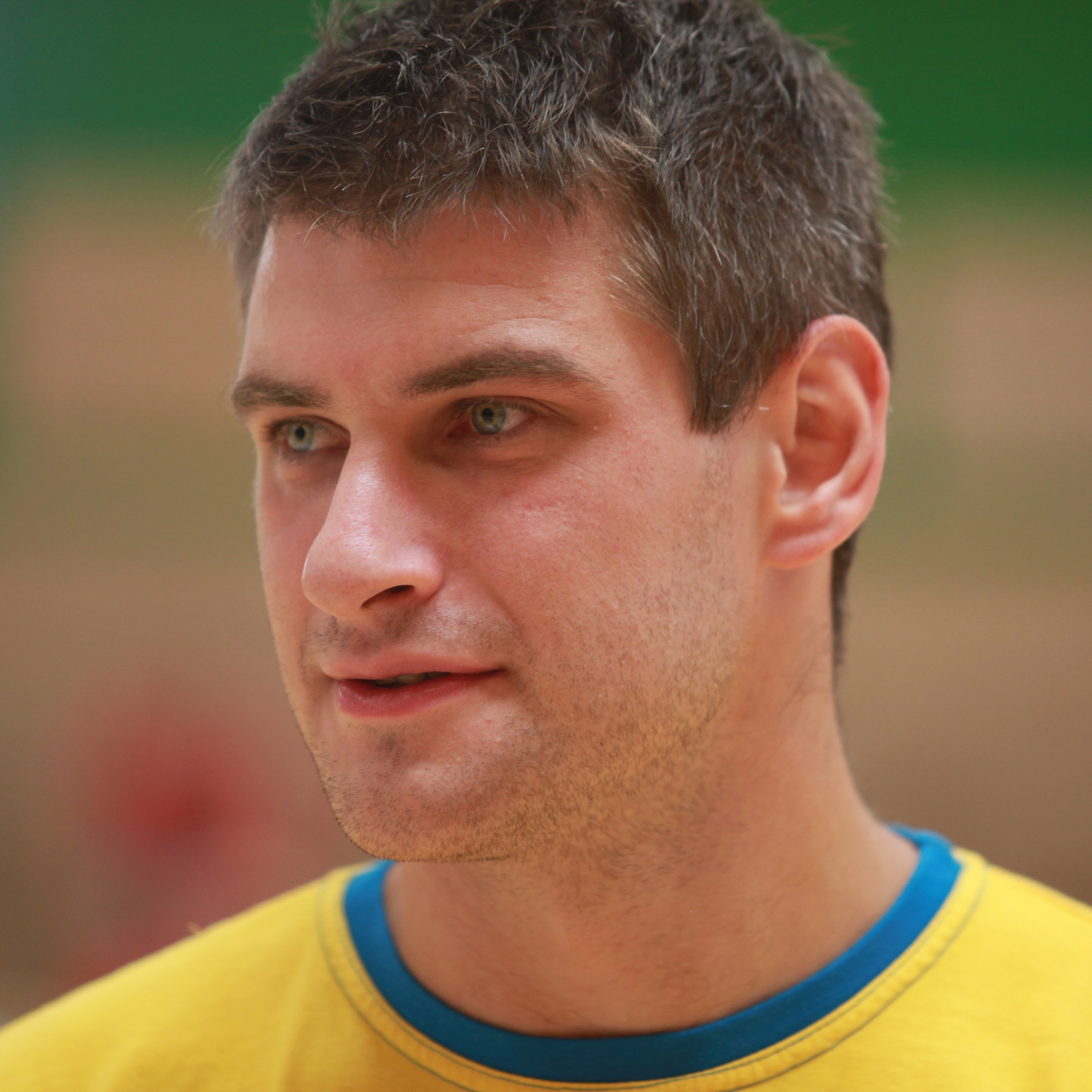
- Aguinagalde in 2013

Personal information
- Full name: Julen Aguinagalde Akizu
- Nationality: Spanish
- Born: 8 December 1982 (age 43) Irun, Spain
- Height: 1.96 m (6 ft 5 in)

Sport
- Sport: Handball
- Position: Pivot
- Current club: Bidasoa Irún
- Number: 13

Senior clubs
- Years: Team
- 1999–2006: Bidasoa
- 2006–2009: Ademar
- 2009–2011: Ciudad Real
- 2011–2013: Atlético Madrid
- 2013–2020: PGE Vive Kielce
- 2020–2022: Bidasoa
National team
Years	Team	Apps	(Gls)
2006–	Spain	105	(485)
Medal record
Olympic Games
Bronze medal – third place	2020 Tokyo	Team
World Championship
Gold medal – first place	2013 Spain
Bronze medal – third place	2011 Sweden
Bronze medal – third place	2021 Egypt
European Championship
Gold medal – first place	2018 Croatia
Gold medal – first place	2020 Sweden/Austria/Norway
Silver medal – second place	2016 Poland
Bronze medal – third place	2014 Denmark
- Updated on 15 June 2022

Julen Aguinagalde Akizu (born 8 December 1982 in Irun, Spain) is a Basque Spanish retired handballer who played as a pivot for the Spanish national team.

== Career ==
Aguinagalde started playing handball in his hometown club Bidasoa Irún. In 1999, he debuted for the senior team in the top division, Liga ASOBAL.

In 2006, he joined Spanish top club Ademar León. Here, he reached the final of EHF European League in 2007, where they lost to German team HSV Hamburg. In 2008, he won the Copa ASOBAL.

In 2009, he joined league rivals BM Ciudad Real, where he won the Spanish championship in 2010, and the Copa del Rey de Balonmano in 2011 and 2012.

In 2013, he joined Polish team KS Kielce. Here, he won the Polish championship every year between 2014 and 2020, and the Polish Cup every year between 2019 and 2020. In 2016, he won the EHF Champions League.

In 2020, he joined his childhood club Bidasoa Irún once again. He played for the club for 2 years before retiring in 2022, and joining Bidasoa Irún as a Sporting Director.
