= Kiril Lazarov =

Macedonian handball player

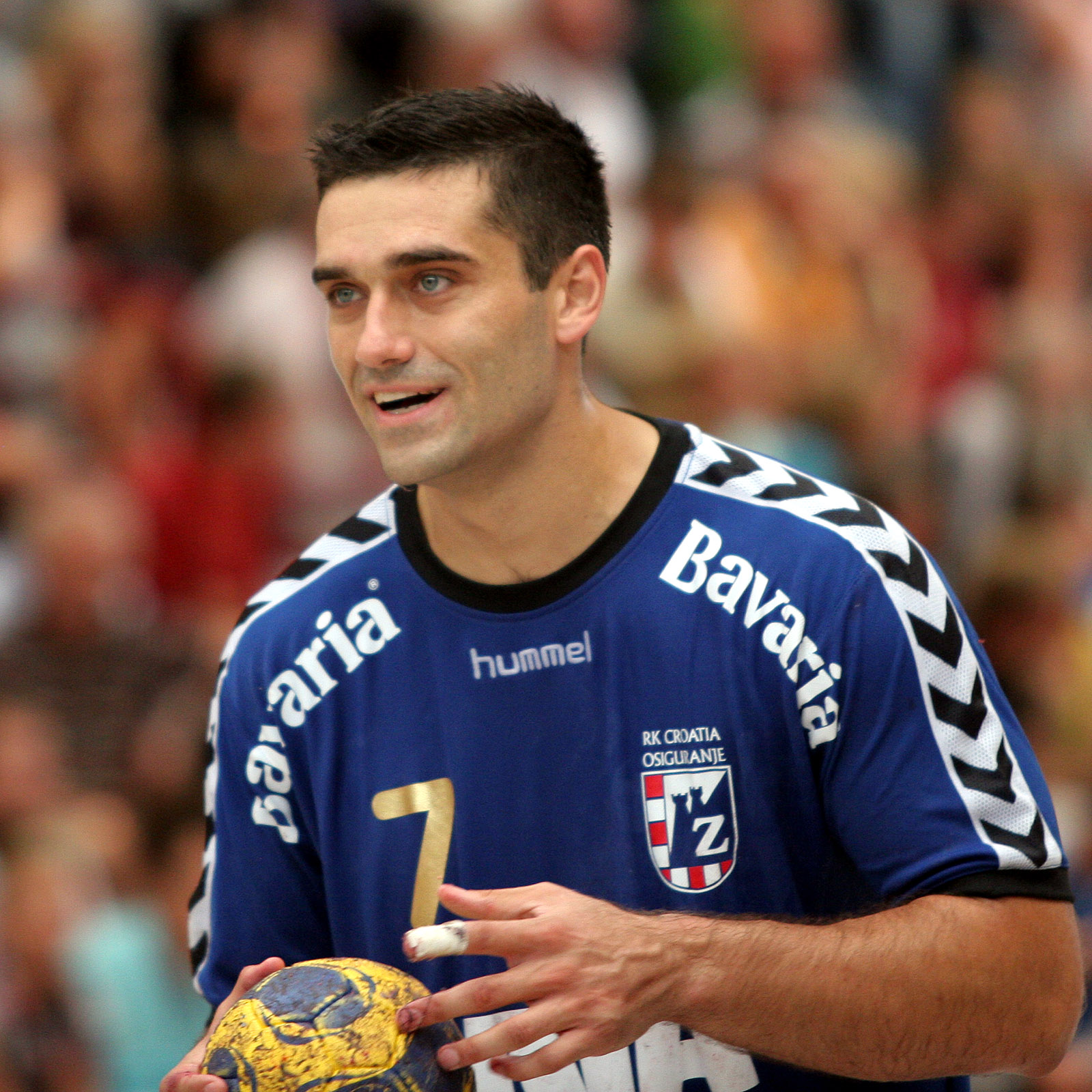
- Lazarov in 2009

Personal information
- Nationality: Macedonian
- Born: 10 May 1980 (age 46) Sveti Nikole, SR Macedonia, Yugoslavia
- Height: 1.93 m (6 ft 4 in)

Sport
- Sport: Handball
- Position: Right back
- Current club: North Macedonia & RK Alkaloid (manager)

Youth career
- Years: Team
- 1991–1994: RK Ovče Pole
- 1994–1995: RK Borec

Senior clubs
- Years: Team
- 1995–1997: RK Borec
- 1997–2000: RK Pelister
- 2000–2002: RK Zagreb
- 2002–2007: MKB Veszprém
- 2007–2010: RK Zagreb
- 2010: Al Sadd SC
- 2010–2011: BM Ciudad Real
- 2011–2013: BM Atlético Madrid
- 2013–2017: FC Barcelona
- 2017–2022: HBC Nantes
National team
Years	Team	Apps	(Gls)
1999–2022	North Macedonia	236	(1728)

Teams managed
- 2021–: North Macedonia
- 2022–: RK Alkaloid

Kiril "Kire" Lazarov (Macedonian: Кирил „Кире“ Лазаров, born 10 May 1980) is a Macedonian former professional handball player and current coach of the North Macedonia national handball team and RK Alkaloid. He is widely regarded as one of the greatest players of all time and won over forty titles playing for clubs in North Macedonia, Croatia, Hungary, and Spain.

Lazarov holds the record for most goals scored in a single World Men's Handball Championship (92). He is also the all-time top scorer in the EHF Champions League and the only player to have scored more than 1,400 goals. He is third on the all-time list of players by number of international goals scored and has the highest ratio of goals scored per match.

== Career ==
Lazarov was the top scorer of the EHF Champions League two times with MKB Veszprém and RK Zagreb. In 2011–12, he was the top scorer for Velux EHF Final 4 runner-up Atlético Madrid.

On 29 January 2009, Lazarov became world record-holder for the number of goals scored in one World Championship. He scored 92 goals in nine games for the Macedonia national team at the 2009 World Men's Handball Championship that took place in Croatia. On 24 March 2009, Lazarov was awarded the Medal for Service to the Country by the then-president of the Republic of Macedonia Branko Crvenkovski in acknowledgment of his sport achievements and his contribution to developing and popularizing the sport in Macedonia as well as promoting the country abroad.

On 27 January 2012, Lazarov became both the European and World record-holder for scored goals in a single championship by scoring 61 goals in 7 games at the 2012 European Men's Handball Championship.

On 4 October 2015, with his fifth goal in a match against PICK Szeged, Lazarov became the first player in the history of the EHF Champions League to break the 1000 goals barrier and helped Barcelona win 30:28.

On 29 May 2016, Lazarov was voted as The Best Right Back of the Champions League All-star team.

In late December 2020, he was voted as best right back of the decade in a poll organized by Handball Planet, with votes coming from fans and a jury consisting of handball legends, coaches and journalists.

Lazarov was inducted into the European Handball Federation Hall of Fame in 2023.

== Honours ==
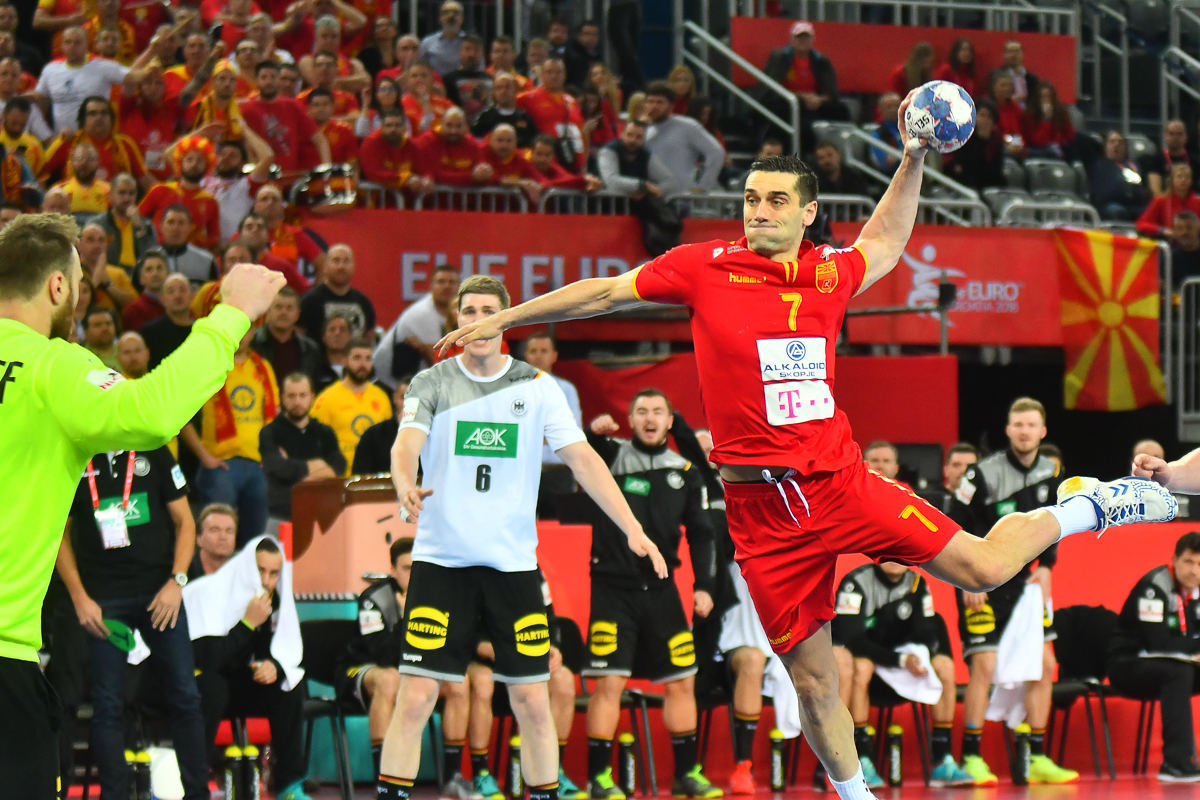
Lazarov at the 2018 European Championship

- RK Pelister
  - Macedonian League: (1997–98 and 1999–00)
  - Macedonian Cup: (1998 and 1999)
- RK Zagreb
  - Croatian League: (2001, 2002, 2008, 2009 and 2010)
  - Croatian Cup: (2000, 2008, 2009 and 2010)
- MKB Veszprem KC
  - Hungarian League: (2003, 2004, 2005 and 2006)
  - Hungarian Cup: ( 2003, 2004, 2005 and 2007)
- BM Ciudad Real
  - Copa del Rey: (2010–11)
  - ASOBAL Cup: (2010–11)
  - ASOBAL Supercup: (2010–11)
  - EHF Champions League runner-up: (2010–11)
  - IHF Super Globe: (2011)
- BM Atlético Madrid
  - ASOBAL Supercup: (2011–12)
  - Copa del Rey: (2011–12) and (2012–13)
  - ASOBAL Cup: (2012–2013)
  - IHF Super Globe: (2012)
- FC Barcelona Handbol
  - EHF Champions League: (2014–15)
  - ASOBAL League: (2013–14), (2014–15) and (2015–16)
  - IHF Super Globe: (2013), (2014)
  - ASOBAL Supercup: (2013–14), (2014–15) and (2015–16)
  - Copa del Rey: (2013–14), (2014–15) and (2015–16)
  - ASOBAL Cup: (2013–14), (2014–15) and (2015–16)
- HBC Nantes
  - EHF Champions League runner-up: (2017–18)

== Personal life ==
Lazarov has been married to his wife Ljubica since June 2006. They have two children, a boy named Blagojče and girl named Lana. His brother Filip is also a handball player.

== See also ==
- List of men's handballers with 1000 or more international goals
