= BM Neptuno =

Spanish handball club

BM Atlético de Madrid
- Full name: Club Deportivo Elemental Balonmano Neptuno
- Founded: 2011
- Dissolved: 2013
- Arena: Palacio Vistalegre, Madrid, Spain
- Capacity: 15,000
- President: (Spain) Domingo Díaz de Mera
- 2012–13: Liga ASOBAL, 2nd
Home	Away

Club Balonmano Neptuno/Atlético de Madrid was a Spanish professional handball team based in Madrid, Spain. Part of the Atlético Madrid sports organization. They played two seasons in the Liga ASOBAL and their home court was the Palacio Vistalegre.

== History ==
Balonmano Atlético de Madrid was created in the early 1950s, it won 11 Spanish Leagues and 10 Spanish Cups between 1952 and 1987, and reached the final of the 1984–85 European Cup and the 1986–87 EHF Cup; they lost both to, respectively, Metaloplastika Sabac and Granitas Kaunas. Jesús Gil disbanded the team in 1992, but it still competed as Atlético de Madrid Alcobendas for two more seasons under the management of some stockholders before finally disappearing in 1994.

Los Colchoneros welcomed handball back into their organization in 2011, formally known as BM Ciudad Real, which folded and relocated to Madrid for financial reasons. The new team started off quite successfully, beating FC Barcelona Handbol 33–26 in the Supercup match in August 2011. When they did so, fan associations in Ciudad Real created Club Balonmano Caserío Ciudad Real as a replacement.

In July 2013, the club announced the shutdown of BM Neptuno/Atletico de Madrid due to little financial support received from public and private entities.

== Season by season ==
Season	Tier	Division	Pos.	Notes
2011–12	1	ASOBAL	2nd	
2012–13	1	ASOBAL	2nd	Disbanded

- 2 seasons in Liga ASOBAL

== Trophies ==
- Liga ASOBAL:
  - Runners-Up: (2). 2011–12, 2012–13.
- Copa del Rey:
  - Champions: (2). 2012, 2013
- Copa ASOBAL:
  - Runners-Up: (1). 2012
- Supercopa ASOBAL:
  - Champions: (1). 2011–12
  - Runners-Up: (1). 2012–13
- EHF Champions League
  - Runners-Up: (1). 2011–12.
- IHF Super Globe:
  - Champions: (1). 2012

== Home arenas ==
City	Arena's name	Term
Madrid	Palacio Vistalegre	2011–2013

== Notable players ==
- (Spain) Isaías Guardiola (2011–2012)
- (Spain) JJ Hombrados
- (Spain) Julen Aguinagalde
- (Sweden) Jonas Källman
- (Spain) David Davis
- (Spain) Roberto García
- (France) Xavier Barachet
- (Spain) Joan Cañellas
- (Poland) Mariusz Jurkiewicz
- (Croatia) Jakov Gojun
- (Croatia) Ivano Balić
- (North Macedonia) Kiril Lazarov
- (Iceland) Ólafur Stefánsson

== Notable coaches ==
- (Spain) Talant Dujshebaev
