= 2015–16 Copa del Rey de Balonmano =

2015–16 Copa del Rey
XLI Copa del Rey 2015–16

Tournament details
- Host country: ESP
- Venue(s): Pabellón Anaitasuna (in Pamplona host cities)
- Dates: 3 October 2015 – 8 May 2016
- Teams: 32

Final positions
- Champions: FC Barcelona Lassa (20th title)
- Runner-up: Helvetia Anaitasuna

Tournament statistics
- Matches played: 35
- Goals scored: 1,970 (56.29 per match)

Awards
- Best player: Jorge Silva

The 2015–16 Copa del Rey de Balonmano was the 41st edition of this tournament, organized by Liga ASOBAL. The tournament began on October 3 and 4, 2015, with the matches of the first round.

FC Barcelona Lassa won its 17th Copa del Rey title after defeating host team Helvetia Anaitasuna in the Final 33–30.

== Competition format and calendar ==
Round	Date	Fixtures	Clubs	Entries
First round	3–4 October 2015	8	32 → 24	New entries: 2015–16 División de Plata teams gain entry. Local team seeding: Luck of the draw. Knock-out tournament type: Single match.
Second round	27–28 October 2015	8	24 → 16	New entries: 8 2015–16 Liga ASOBAL teams (the 5 last non-relegated in the previous season and the 3 promoted from Plata) gain entry. Local team seeding: Match at home of team in lower division. Knock-out tournament type: Single match.
Round of 16	15–16 December 2015	8	16 → 8	New entries: the 8 top teams in 2014–15 Liga ASOBAL gain entry. Local team seeding: Match at home of team that qualified from the second round. Knock-out tournament type: single match.
Quarter-finals	9 March 2016	8	8 → 4	Local team seeding: Luck of the draw. Knock-out tournament type: Double match.
Quarter-finals	12 March 2016	8	8 → 4	Local team seeding: Luck of the draw. Knock-out tournament type: Double match.
Final Four		3	4 → 1	Local team seeding: Semifinals and finals played at home of one of the four qualified teams. Knock-out tournament type: Final four.

== First round ==
Matches were played on 1, 3 and 4 October 2015.

All times are CEST.

Team 1	Score	Team 2
Alarcos Ciudad Real (Castilla–La Mancha)	24–23	(Galicia (Spain)) Academia Octavio
Cisne (Galicia (Spain))	25–27	(Asturias) Juanfersa Comunicalia
R.G.C. Covadonga (Asturias)	21–22	(Castile and León) Viveros Herol Nava
Meridiano Antequera (Andalusia)	22–26	(Community of Madrid) Alcobendas
BM La Roca (Catalonia)	28–32	(Castile and León) MMT Seguros Zamora
Zumosol ARS Palma del Río (Andalusia)	27–29 (a.e.t.)	(Catalonia) FC Barcelona B Lassa
Amenabar Zarautz (Basque Country (autonomous community))	23–26	(Basque Country (autonomous community)) Bidasoa Irun
Bordils (Catalonia)	29–28	(Castile and León) Atlético Valladolid

=== Matches ===
1 October 2015; 20:30	BM La Roca	28–32	MMT Seguros Zamora	Pavelló Municipal, La Roca del Vallès; Attendance: 300; Referees: Ausas Busquets, Escoda Pérez
1 October 2015; 20:30	Vaquer 8	(13–14)	Magadán, Camino 5	Pavelló Municipal, La Roca del Vallès; Attendance: 300; Referees: Ausas Busquets, Escoda Pérez
1 October 2015; 20:30	2× (yellow card) 1× (suspension)	Report	3× (yellow card) 6× (suspension)	Pavelló Municipal, La Roca del Vallès; Attendance: 300; Referees: Ausas Busquets, Escoda Pérez

3 October 2015; 17:30	Cisne	25–27	Juanfersa Comunicalia	Centro Galego de Tecnificación Deportiva, Pontevedra; Attendance: 238; Referees: Rodríguez Estévez, Rosendo López
3 October 2015; 17:30	Cuadrado 7	(14–14)	Pellitero 9	Centro Galego de Tecnificación Deportiva, Pontevedra; Attendance: 238; Referees: Rodríguez Estévez, Rosendo López
3 October 2015; 17:30	3× (yellow card) 2× (suspension)	Report	3× (yellow card) 3× (suspension)	Centro Galego de Tecnificación Deportiva, Pontevedra; Attendance: 238; Referees: Rodríguez Estévez, Rosendo López

3 October 2015; 18:30	Meridiano Antequera	22–26	Alcobendas	Fernando Argüelles, Antequera; Attendance: 300; Referees: Colmenero Guillén, Rollán Martín
3 October 2015; 18:30	Moll 7	(10–12)	M Muñoz 9	Fernando Argüelles, Antequera; Attendance: 300; Referees: Colmenero Guillén, Rollán Martín
3 October 2015; 18:30	3× (yellow card) 2× (suspension)	Report	2× (yellow card) 3× (suspension)	Fernando Argüelles, Antequera; Attendance: 300; Referees: Colmenero Guillén, Rollán Martín

3 October 2015; 19:30	Amenabar Zarautz	23–26	Bidasoa Irun	Polideportivo Municipal, Zarautz; Attendance: 600; Referees: Elordui Elorrieta, Gutiérrez Quintano
3 October 2015; 19:30	Aguirrezabalaga 6	(10–14)	Crowley 7	Polideportivo Municipal, Zarautz; Attendance: 600; Referees: Elordui Elorrieta, Gutiérrez Quintano
3 October 2015; 19:30	2× (yellow card) 4× (suspension)	Report	3× (yellow card) 6× (suspension)	Polideportivo Municipal, Zarautz; Attendance: 600; Referees: Elordui Elorrieta, Gutiérrez Quintano

3 October 2015; 20:00	Bordils	29–28	Atlético Valladolid	Pavelló Blanc i Verd, Bordils; Attendance: 800; Referees: Muñoz Díaz, Posada González
3 October 2015; 20:00	Nonó 9	(14–11)	Hernández 11	Pavelló Blanc i Verd, Bordils; Attendance: 800; Referees: Muñoz Díaz, Posada González
3 October 2015; 20:00	3× (yellow card) 5× (suspension) 1× (red card)	Report	3× (yellow card) 3× (suspension) 1× (red card)	Pavelló Blanc i Verd, Bordils; Attendance: 800; Referees: Muñoz Díaz, Posada González

3 October 2015; 20:00	R.G.C. Covadonga	21–22	Viveros Herol Nava	Pabellón Braulio García, Gijón; Attendance: 150; Referees: Portela Fernández, Rodríguez Mondelo
3 October 2015; 20:00	Paraja 6	(12–12)	three players 4	Pabellón Braulio García, Gijón; Attendance: 150; Referees: Portela Fernández, Rodríguez Mondelo
3 October 2015; 20:00	3× (yellow card) 1× (suspension)	Report	2× (yellow card)	Pabellón Braulio García, Gijón; Attendance: 150; Referees: Portela Fernández, Rodríguez Mondelo

4 October 2015; 12:00	Alarcos Ciudad Real	24–23	Academia Octavio	Quijote Arena, Ciudad Real; Attendance: 450; Referees: García Vico, Sanmartín Almazán
4 October 2015; 12:00	Vidal 6	(9–11)	Iglesias 8	Quijote Arena, Ciudad Real; Attendance: 450; Referees: García Vico, Sanmartín Almazán
4 October 2015; 12:00	2× (yellow card) 4× (suspension)	Report	1× (yellow card) 4× (suspension)	Quijote Arena, Ciudad Real; Attendance: 450; Referees: García Vico, Sanmartín Almazán

4 October 2015; 12:30	Zumosol ARS Palma del Río	27–29 (ET)	FC Barcelona B Lassa	Pabellón El Pandero, Palma del Río; Attendance: 150; Referees: Mendoza Roldán, Visciarelli Lareo
4 October 2015; 12:30	Morales 9	(10–10)	Márquez 7	Pabellón El Pandero, Palma del Río; Attendance: 150; Referees: Mendoza Roldán, Visciarelli Lareo
4 October 2015; 12:30	3× (yellow card) 1× (suspension)	Report	3× (yellow card) 1× (suspension)	Pabellón El Pandero, Palma del Río; Attendance: 150; Referees: Mendoza Roldán, Visciarelli Lareo

Teams qualified to next round
MMT Seguros Zamora	Juanfersa Comunicalia	Alcobendas	Bidasoa Irun
Bordils	Viveros Herol Nava	Alarcos Ciudad Real	FC Barcelona B Lassa

== Second round ==
The second round was drawn with the first one. Matches were played on 27 and 28 October 2015.

All times are CET.

Team 1	Score	Team 2
Alarcos Ciudad Real (Castilla–La Mancha)	27–31	(Aragon) Bada Huesca
Juanfersa Comunicalia (Asturias)	26–23	(Andalusia) Ángel Ximénez Puente Genil
Viveros Herol Nava (Castile and León)	29–25	(Castilla–La Mancha) Globalcaja Ciudad Encantada
Alcobendas (Community of Madrid)	32–31 (a.e.t.)	(Castilla–La Mancha) BM Guadalajara
MMT Seguros Zamora (Castile and León)	26–28	(Cantabria) GO Fit
FC Barcelona B Lassa (Catalonia)	37–29	(Aragon) BM Aragón
Bidasoa Irun (Basque Country (autonomous community))	30–29	(Galicia (Spain)) Teucro
Bordils (Catalonia)	26–30	(Valencian Community) Fertiberia Puerto Sagunto

=== Matches ===
27 October 2015; 20:15	Bidasoa Irun	30–29	Teucro	Polideportivo Artaleku, Irun; Attendance: 1,200; Referees: Carlos & Juan José Gude Priego
27 October 2015; 20:15	Crowley, C Martínez 6	(16–15)	C García 7	Polideportivo Artaleku, Irun; Attendance: 1,200; Referees: Carlos & Juan José Gude Priego
27 October 2015; 20:15	2× (yellow card) 7× (suspension) 1× (red card)	Report	2× (yellow card) 6× (suspension) 2× (red card)	Polideportivo Artaleku, Irun; Attendance: 1,200; Referees: Carlos & Juan José Gude Priego

27 October 2015; 20:30	MMT Seguros Zamora	26–28	GO Fit	Pabellón Ángel Nieto, Zamora; Attendance: 1,000; Referees: Merino Mori, Moyano Prieto
27 October 2015; 20:30	Magadán 5	(14–14)	Paredes 5	Pabellón Ángel Nieto, Zamora; Attendance: 1,000; Referees: Merino Mori, Moyano Prieto
27 October 2015; 20:30	2× (yellow card) 6× (suspension)	Report	3× (yellow card) 4× (suspension)	Pabellón Ángel Nieto, Zamora; Attendance: 1,000; Referees: Merino Mori, Moyano Prieto

28 October 2015; 19:30	Alcobendas	32–31 (ET)	BM Guadalajara	Pabellón de Los Sueños, Alcobendas; Attendance: 500; Referees: Hermoso del Amo, Monjo Ortega
28 October 2015; 19:30	H González 12	(12–14)	Márquez 6	Pabellón de Los Sueños, Alcobendas; Attendance: 500; Referees: Hermoso del Amo, Monjo Ortega
28 October 2015; 19:30	3× (yellow card) 5× (suspension)	Report	2× (yellow card) 7× (suspension) 1× (red card)	Pabellón de Los Sueños, Alcobendas; Attendance: 500; Referees: Hermoso del Amo, Monjo Ortega

28 October 2015; 20:00	FC Barcelona B Lassa	37–29	BM Aragón	Ciutat Esportiva Joan Gamper, Sant Joan Despí; Attendance: 500; Referees: García Serradilla, Marín Lorente
28 October 2015; 20:00	Pérez-Ortíz 8	(20–20)	Linares 8	Ciutat Esportiva Joan Gamper, Sant Joan Despí; Attendance: 500; Referees: García Serradilla, Marín Lorente
28 October 2015; 20:00	2× (suspension)	Report		Ciutat Esportiva Joan Gamper, Sant Joan Despí; Attendance: 500; Referees: García Serradilla, Marín Lorente

28 October 2015; 20:30	Alarcos Ciudad Real	27–31	Bada Huesca	Quijote Arena, Ciudad Real; Attendance: 800; Referees: Casado Fernández, Vera Ávila
28 October 2015; 20:30	Fernández 7	(15–16)	three players 4	Quijote Arena, Ciudad Real; Attendance: 800; Referees: Casado Fernández, Vera Ávila
28 October 2015; 20:30	2× (yellow card) 4× (suspension)	Report	3× (yellow card) 3× (suspension)	Quijote Arena, Ciudad Real; Attendance: 800; Referees: Casado Fernández, Vera Ávila

28 October 2015; 20:30	Juanfersa Comunicalia	26–23	Ángel Ximénez Puente Genil	Palacio de Deportes, Gijón; Attendance: 300; Referees: Jesús & Jorge Escudero Santiuste
28 October 2015; 20:30	Pellitero, Beret 5	(13–11)	Nacho Moya 5	Palacio de Deportes, Gijón; Attendance: 300; Referees: Jesús & Jorge Escudero Santiuste
28 October 2015; 20:30	3× (suspension)	Report	5× (suspension)	Palacio de Deportes, Gijón; Attendance: 300; Referees: Jesús & Jorge Escudero Santiuste

28 October 2015; 21:00	Bordils	26–30	Fertiberia Puerto Sagunto	Pavelló Blanc i Verd, Bordils; Attendance: 850; Referees: Peñaranda Ortega, Yagüe Moros
28 October 2015; 21:00	Nonó 7	(10–14)	Alegre 9	Pavelló Blanc i Verd, Bordils; Attendance: 850; Referees: Peñaranda Ortega, Yagüe Moros
28 October 2015; 21:00	3× (yellow card) 3× (suspension)	Report	3× (yellow card) 7× (suspension)	Pavelló Blanc i Verd, Bordils; Attendance: 850; Referees: Peñaranda Ortega, Yagüe Moros

28 October 2015; 21:00	Viveros Herol Nava	29–25	Globalcaja Ciudad Encantada	Polideportivo Municipal, Nava de la Asunción; Attendance: 635; Referees: Miranda Bedate, San Pedro Colorado
28 October 2015; 21:00	Villagrán 11	(17–9)	López 9	Polideportivo Municipal, Nava de la Asunción; Attendance: 635; Referees: Miranda Bedate, San Pedro Colorado
28 October 2015; 21:00	2× (yellow card) 3× (suspension)	Report	2× (yellow card) 1× (suspension)	Polideportivo Municipal, Nava de la Asunción; Attendance: 635; Referees: Miranda Bedate, San Pedro Colorado

Teams qualified to next round
Bidasoa Irun	GO Fit	Alcobendas	FC Barcelona B Lassa
Bada Huesca	Juanfersa Comunicalia	Fertiberia Puerto Sagunto	Viveros Herol Nava

== Round of 16 ==
The draw took place on 29 October 2015 at RFEBM's headquarters.

Matches were played on 15 and 16 December.

Team 1	Score	Team 2
FC Barcelona B Lassa (Catalonia)	25–32	Naturhouse La Rioja
Juanfersa Comunicalia (Asturias)	20–32	(Catalonia) Fraikin Granollers
Bada Huesca (Aragon)	29–31	(Castile and León) ABANCA Ademar León
Secin Group Alcobendas (Community of Madrid)	31–32 (a.e.t.)	(Valencian Community) Benidorm
GO Fit (Cantabria)	24–29	(Castile and León) Villa de Aranda
Fertiberia Puerto Sagunto (Valencian Community)	25–43	(Catalonia) FC Barcelona Lassa
Viveros Herol Nava (Castile and León)	27–28	(Galicia (Spain)) Frigoríficos del Morrazo
Bidasoa Irun (Basque Country (autonomous community))	30–31	(Navarre) Helvetia Anaitasuna

=== Matches ===
15 December 2015; 20:15	Fertiberia Puerto Sagunto	25–43	FC Barcelona Lassa	Pabellón Polideportivo Internúcleos, Puerto Sagunto; Attendance: 700; Referees: Casado Fernández, Vera Ávila
15 December 2015; 20:15	R Ruiz 5	(12–25)	Kopljar 8	Pabellón Polideportivo Internúcleos, Puerto Sagunto; Attendance: 700; Referees: Casado Fernández, Vera Ávila
15 December 2015; 20:15	2× (yellow card)	Report	3× (yellow card) 1× (suspension)	Pabellón Polideportivo Internúcleos, Puerto Sagunto; Attendance: 700; Referees: Casado Fernández, Vera Ávila

16 December 2015; 20:00	FC Barcelona B Lassa	25–32	Naturhouse La Rioja	Ciutat Esportiva Joan Gamper, Sant Joan Despí; Attendance: 500; Referees: Luque Cabrejas, Pascual Sánchez
16 December 2015; 20:00	Ceretta 5	(13–15)	A Fernández 8	Ciutat Esportiva Joan Gamper, Sant Joan Despí; Attendance: 500; Referees: Luque Cabrejas, Pascual Sánchez
16 December 2015; 20:00	2× (suspension)	Report	1× (suspension)	Ciutat Esportiva Joan Gamper, Sant Joan Despí; Attendance: 500; Referees: Luque Cabrejas, Pascual Sánchez

16 December 2015; 20:15	Bidasoa Irun	30–31	Helvetia Anaitasuna	Polideportivo Artaleku, Irun; Attendance: 900; Referees: Peñaranda Ortega, Yagüe Moros
16 December 2015; 20:15	Crowley 8	(16–15)	Costoya 7	Polideportivo Artaleku, Irun; Attendance: 900; Referees: Peñaranda Ortega, Yagüe Moros
16 December 2015; 20:15	3× (yellow card) 3× (suspension)	Report	2× (yellow card) 4× (suspension)	Polideportivo Artaleku, Irun; Attendance: 900; Referees: Peñaranda Ortega, Yagüe Moros

16 December 2015; 20:30	Bada Huesca	29–31	ABANCA Ademar León	Palacio Municipal, Huesca; Attendance: 450; Referees: Ballano Dueñas, Rodríguez Rodríguez
16 December 2015; 20:30	Marcelo 7	(15–16)	Santos 8	Palacio Municipal, Huesca; Attendance: 450; Referees: Ballano Dueñas, Rodríguez Rodríguez
16 December 2015; 20:30	3× (yellow card) 3× (suspension)	Report	3× (yellow card) 4× (suspension) 1× (red card)	Palacio Municipal, Huesca; Attendance: 450; Referees: Ballano Dueñas, Rodríguez Rodríguez

16 December 2015; 20:30	GO Fit	24–29	Villa de Aranda	Pabellón de La Albericia, Santander; Attendance: 1,100; Referees: Álvarez Mata, Bustamante López
16 December 2015; 20:30	Lon 6	(11–17)	dos Santos 10	Pabellón de La Albericia, Santander; Attendance: 1,100; Referees: Álvarez Mata, Bustamante López
16 December 2015; 20:30	3× (yellow card) 5× (suspension) 1× (red card)	Report	2× (yellow card) 2× (suspension)	Pabellón de La Albericia, Santander; Attendance: 1,100; Referees: Álvarez Mata, Bustamante López

16 December 2015; 20:30	Juanfersa Comunicalia	20–32	Fraikin Granollers	Palacio de Deportes, Gijón; Attendance: 250; Referees: Fernández Fernández, Martín Franco
16 December 2015; 20:30	Beret 5	(8–15)	Figueras, Solé 6	Palacio de Deportes, Gijón; Attendance: 250; Referees: Fernández Fernández, Martín Franco
16 December 2015; 20:30		Report	2× (suspension)	Palacio de Deportes, Gijón; Attendance: 250; Referees: Fernández Fernández, Martín Franco

16 December 2015; 20:30	Secin Group Alcobendas	31–32 (ET)	Benidorm	Pabellón de los Sueños, Alcobendas; Attendance: 650; Referees: García Mosquera, Muro San José
16 December 2015; 20:30	Llopis 7	(14–14)	Jiménez 7	Pabellón de los Sueños, Alcobendas; Attendance: 650; Referees: García Mosquera, Muro San José
16 December 2015; 20:30	3× (yellow card) 6× (suspension) 1× (red card)	Report	3× (yellow card) 7× (suspension) 1× (red card)	Pabellón de los Sueños, Alcobendas; Attendance: 650; Referees: García Mosquera, Muro San José

16 December 2015; 21:00	Viveros Herol Nava	27–28	Frigoríficos del Morrazo	Polideportivo Municipal, Nava de la Asunción; Attendance: 846; Referees: Fernández Molina, Murillo Castro
16 December 2015; 21:00	Campillo 8	(17–28)	Soliño 9	Polideportivo Municipal, Nava de la Asunción; Attendance: 846; Referees: Fernández Molina, Murillo Castro
16 December 2015; 21:00	3× (yellow card) 3× (suspension)	Report	3× (yellow card) 4× (suspension)	Polideportivo Municipal, Nava de la Asunción; Attendance: 846; Referees: Fernández Molina, Murillo Castro

Teams qualified to next round
FC Barcelona Lassa	Naturhouse La Rioja	Helvetia Anaitasuna	ABANCA Ademar León
Villa de Aranda	Fraikin Granollers	Benidorm	Frigoríficos del Morrazo

== Quarter-finals ==
The draw took place on 19 December 2015 at Palacio de los Deportes de León's press room.

The matches were played on 9 March (1st leg) and 12 March (2nd leg).

Team 1	Agg.	Team 2	1st leg	2nd leg
Fraikin Granollers (Catalonia)	51–66	(Catalonia) FC Barcelona Lassa	27–34	24–32
Helvetia Anaitasuna (Navarre)	58–51	(Galicia (Spain)) Frigoríficos del Morrazo	35–24	23–27
ABANCA Ademar León (Castile and León)	63–50	(Valencian Community) Benidorm	33–21	30–29
Villa de Aranda (Castile and León)	52–57	Naturhouse La Rioja	26–27	26–30

=== Matches ===
==== First leg ====
9 March 2016; 20:00	Helvetia Anaitasuna	35–24	Frigoríficos del Morrazo	Pabellón Anaitasuna, Pamplona; Attendance: 1,000; Referees: Escudero Santiuste, Jesús & Jorge
9 March 2016; 20:00	Ugarte, Fernandes 7	(15–10)	Rosales 6	Pabellón Anaitasuna, Pamplona; Attendance: 1,000; Referees: Escudero Santiuste, Jesús & Jorge
9 March 2016; 20:00	2× (yellow card) 2× (suspension)	Report	2× (yellow card) 1× (suspension)	Pabellón Anaitasuna, Pamplona; Attendance: 1,000; Referees: Escudero Santiuste, Jesús & Jorge

9 March 2016; 20:30	Fraikin Granollers	27–34	FC Barcelona Lassa	Palau d'Esports, Granollers; Attendance: 1,675; Referees: García Mosquera, Muro San José
9 March 2016; 20:30	A García, Solé 5	(13–17)	Lazarov 8	Palau d'Esports, Granollers; Attendance: 1,675; Referees: García Mosquera, Muro San José
9 March 2016; 20:30	3× (yellow card)	Report	3× (yellow card) 2× (suspension)	Palau d'Esports, Granollers; Attendance: 1,675; Referees: García Mosquera, Muro San José

9 March 2016; 20:30	Villa de Aranda	26–27	Naturhouse La Rioja	Pabellón Príncipe de Asturias, Aranda de Duero; Attendance: 900; Referees: Hermoso del Amo, Monjo Ortega
9 March 2016; 20:30	Muñoz, Nantes 7	(9–11)	Molina, García 5	Pabellón Príncipe de Asturias, Aranda de Duero; Attendance: 900; Referees: Hermoso del Amo, Monjo Ortega
9 March 2016; 20:30	2× (yellow card) 2× (suspension)	Report	3× (yellow card) 5× (suspension)	Pabellón Príncipe de Asturias, Aranda de Duero; Attendance: 900; Referees: Hermoso del Amo, Monjo Ortega

9 March 2016; 20:45	ABANCA Ademar León	33–21	Benidorm	Palacio de los Deportes, León; Attendance: 1,600; Referees: Álvarez Mata, Bustamante López
9 March 2016; 20:45	Vieyra, 6	(16–8)	tthree players 4	Palacio de los Deportes, León; Attendance: 1,600; Referees: Álvarez Mata, Bustamante López
9 March 2016; 20:45	2× (yellow card) 4× (suspension)	Report	3× (yellow card) 2× (suspension)	Palacio de los Deportes, León; Attendance: 1,600; Referees: Álvarez Mata, Bustamante López

==== Second leg ====
12 March 2016; 18:30	Benidorm	29–30	ABANCA Ademar León	Palau d'Esports L'Illa, Benidorm; Attendance: 600; Referees: Fernández Pérez, García Rodríguez
12 March 2016; 18:30	Marchán 7	(18–15)	Santos 8	Palau d'Esports L'Illa, Benidorm; Attendance: 600; Referees: Fernández Pérez, García Rodríguez
12 March 2016; 18:30	2× (yellow card) 8× (suspension) 2× (red card)	Report	3× (yellow card) 3× (suspension) 1× (red card)	Palau d'Esports L'Illa, Benidorm; Attendance: 600; Referees: Fernández Pérez, García Rodríguez

12 March 2016; 18:30	FC Barcelona Lassa	32–24	Fraikin Granollers	Palau Blaugrana, Barcelona; Attendance: 2,682; Referees: Álvarez Mata, Bustamante López
12 March 2016; 18:30	Lazarov 7	(15–13)	Resina 6	Palau Blaugrana, Barcelona; Attendance: 2,682; Referees: Álvarez Mata, Bustamante López
12 March 2016; 18:30	3× (yellow card) 1× (suspension)	Report	2× (yellow card) 2× (suspension)	Palau Blaugrana, Barcelona; Attendance: 2,682; Referees: Álvarez Mata, Bustamante López

12 March 2016; 18:30	Frigoríficos del Morrazo	27–23	Helvetia Anaitasuna	Pabellón O Gatañal, Cangas; Attendance: 700; Referees: Fernández Fernández, Martín Franco
12 March 2016; 18:30	García 6	(14–11)	Nadoveza 5	Pabellón O Gatañal, Cangas; Attendance: 700; Referees: Fernández Fernández, Martín Franco
12 March 2016; 18:30	1× (yellow card) 3× (suspension)	Report	3× (yellow card) 2× (suspension)	Pabellón O Gatañal, Cangas; Attendance: 700; Referees: Fernández Fernández, Martín Franco

12 March 2016; 20:00	Naturhouse La Rioja	30–26	Villa de Aranda	Palacio de los Deportes, Logroño; Attendance: 2,000; Referees: Merino Mori, Moyano Prieto
12 March 2016; 20:00	Á Fernández 6	(14–10)	Nantes 6	Palacio de los Deportes, Logroño; Attendance: 2,000; Referees: Merino Mori, Moyano Prieto
12 March 2016; 20:00	2× (yellow card) 4× (suspension)	Report	1× (yellow card) 4× (suspension)	Palacio de los Deportes, Logroño; Attendance: 2,000; Referees: Merino Mori, Moyano Prieto

Teams qualified to Final Four
ABANCA Ademar León	FC Barcelona Lassa
Helvetia Anaitasuna	Naturhouse La Rioja

== Final four ==
The Final Four was played on 7/8 May at Pabellón Anaitasuna in Pamplona, Navarre. The draw was conducted on 18 April. Helvetia Anaitasuna's win over Naturhouse La Rioja in semifinals qualified it for 2016–17 EHF Cup as FC Barcelona, Naturhouse La Rioja and ABANCA Ademar León are already qualified for European competitions via Liga ASOBAL.

Semifinals
(Catalonia) FC Barcelona Lassa	33
(Castile and León) ABANCA Ademar León	27
(Navarre) Helvetia Anaitasuna	31
Naturhouse La Rioja	28

Final
(Catalonia) FC Barcelona Lassa	33
(Navarre) Helvetia Anaitasuna	30

=== Semifinals ===
7 May; 18:00 (UTC+2)	FC Barcelona Lassa	33–27	ABANCA Ademar León	Pabellón Anaitasuna, Pamplona; Attendance: 3,500; Referees: Raluy López, Sabroso Ramírez
7 May; 18:00 (UTC+2)	Syprzak 5	(20–12)	Juanjo Fernández 6	Pabellón Anaitasuna, Pamplona; Attendance: 3,500; Referees: Raluy López, Sabroso Ramírez
7 May; 18:00 (UTC+2)	2× (yellow card) 3× (suspension)	Boxscore	3× (yellow card) 4× (suspension)	Pabellón Anaitasuna, Pamplona; Attendance: 3,500; Referees: Raluy López, Sabroso Ramírez

7 May; 20:00 (UTC+2)	Helvetia Anaitasuna	31–28	Naturhouse La Rioja	Pabellón Anaitasuna, Pamplona; Attendance: 3,600; Referees: Marín Lorente, García Serradilla
7 May; 20:00 (UTC+2)	Costoya 10	(16–11)	P Rodríguez 7	Pabellón Anaitasuna, Pamplona; Attendance: 3,600; Referees: Marín Lorente, García Serradilla
7 May; 20:00 (UTC+2)	2× (yellow card) 4× (suspension) 1× (red card)	Boxscore	3× (yellow card) 4× (suspension) 2× (red card)	Pabellón Anaitasuna, Pamplona; Attendance: 3,600; Referees: Marín Lorente, García Serradilla

=== Final ===
8 May; 17:00 (UTC+2)	FC Barcelona Lassa	33–30	Helvetia Anaitasuna	Pabellón Anaitasuna, Pamplona; Attendance: 3,800; Referees: Álvarez Mata, Bustamante López
8 May; 17:00 (UTC+2)	Silva 8	(14–16)	V Tomás 8	Pabellón Anaitasuna, Pamplona; Attendance: 3,800; Referees: Álvarez Mata, Bustamante López
8 May; 17:00 (UTC+2)	3× (yellow card) 6× (suspension)	Boxscore	3× (yellow card) 5× (suspension)	Pabellón Anaitasuna, Pamplona; Attendance: 3,800; Referees: Álvarez Mata, Bustamante López

2015–16 Copa del Rey de Balonmano winners
(Catalonia)
FC Barcelona Lassa
Twentieth title

== See also ==
- Liga ASOBAL 2015–16
- División de Plata de Balonmano 2015–16
