= 2014–15 Copa del Rey de Balonmano =

2014–15 Copa del Rey
XL Copa del Rey 2014–15

Tournament details
- Dates: 4 October 2014 – 7 May 2015
- Teams: 32

Final positions
- Champions: FC Barcelona (19th title)
- Runners-up: BM Granollers

Tournament statistics
- Matches played: 35
- Goals scored: 2,055 (58.71 per match)
- Attendance: 37,672 (1,076 per match)
- Top scorer: Víctor Tomás

Awards
- Best player: Raúl Entrerríos

The Copa del Rey de Balonmano 2014–15 was the 40th edition of this tournament, organized by Liga ASOBAL. The tournament began on October 4 and 5 with the matches of the first round.

FC Barcelona won its nineteenth Copa del Rey title after defeating BM Granollers 27–26 in the Final. Further, with this win, FC Barcelona achieved a 2014–15 season trophy record (7), winning every trophy which they played: Liga ASOBAL, Copa del Rey, Copa ASOBAL, Supercopa ASOBAL, EHF Champions League, Superglobe and the Supercopa de Catalunya.

== Competition format ==
=== Knockout stage ===
- First round (single match)
- Second round (single match)
- Round of 16 (single match)
- Quarter-final (two legs)

=== Final four ===
- Semifinals (single match)
- Final (single match)

== Calendar ==
Round	Date	Fixtures	Clubs	Notes
First round	4/5 October 2014	8	16 → 16	División de Plata teams gain entry
Second round	22 October 2014	8	16 → 16	8 Liga ASOBAL teams teams gain entry
Round of 16	5 November 2014	8	16 → 8	8 Liga ASOBAL teams teams gain entry
Quarter-finals	4 February 2015	8	8 → 4	
Quarter-finals	1 April 2015	8	8 → 4	
Final Four	6/7 June 2015	3	4 → 1	

== First round ==
Matches were played on 4 and 5 October 2014.

All times are CEST.

Team 1	Score	Team 2
Bordils (Catalonia)	30–28	(Community of Madrid) Alcobendas
Interstar Deporte Algemesí (Valencian Community)	34–31 (a.e.t.)	(Galicia (Spain)) Academia Octavio
Viveros Herol Nava (Castile and León)	28–24	(Andalusia) Meridiano Antequera
Zumosol ARS Palma del Río (Andalusia)	31–30	(Cantabria) Go Fit
Torrelavega (Cantabria)	21–26	(Catalonia) FC Barcelona B
La Roca (Catalonia)	25–24	(Basque Country (autonomous community)) Automobica Barakaldo
Teucro (Galicia (Spain))	43–35	(Basque Country (autonomous community)) Amenabar Zarautz
Atlético Valladolid (Castile and León)	31–27	(Basque Country (autonomous community)) Bidasoa Irún

=== Matches ===
4 September 2014; 18:00	Viveros Herol Nava	28–24	Meridiano Antequera	Polideportivo Municipal, Nava de la Asunción; Attendance: 988; Referees: López Romero, Mohedano Fernández
4 September 2014; 18:00	Villagrán 7	(13–14)	A Rodríguez 8	Polideportivo Municipal, Nava de la Asunción; Attendance: 988; Referees: López Romero, Mohedano Fernández
4 September 2014; 18:00	3× (yellow card) 2× (suspension)	Report	3× (yellow card) 4× (suspension)	Polideportivo Municipal, Nava de la Asunción; Attendance: 988; Referees: López Romero, Mohedano Fernández

4 September 2014; 18:30	Torrelavega	21–26	FC Barcelona B	Pabellón Vicente Trueba, Torrelavega; Referees: Álvarez Menéndez, Friera Cavada
4 September 2014; 18:30	Hernández 7	(9–12)	Lancina 6	Pabellón Vicente Trueba, Torrelavega; Referees: Álvarez Menéndez, Friera Cavada
4 September 2014; 18:30	3× (yellow card) 5× (suspension)	Report	2× (yellow card) 4× (suspension)	Pabellón Vicente Trueba, Torrelavega; Referees: Álvarez Menéndez, Friera Cavada

4 September 2014; 20:00	La Roca	25–24	Automobica Barakaldo	Pavelló Nou, La Roca del Vallès; Attendance: 600; Referees: Fernández Molina, Murillo Castro
4 September 2014; 20:00	Pérez, Sánchez 6	(10–11)	Momeñe 7	Pavelló Nou, La Roca del Vallès; Attendance: 600; Referees: Fernández Molina, Murillo Castro
4 September 2014; 20:00	3× (yellow card) 2× (suspension)	Report	2× (yellow card) 7× (suspension) 1× (red card)	Pavelló Nou, La Roca del Vallès; Attendance: 600; Referees: Fernández Molina, Murillo Castro

4 September 2014; 20:00	Bordils	30–28	Alcobendas	Pavelló Blanc i Verd, Bordils; Attendance: 780; Referees: Iniesta Castillo, Soria Fabián
4 September 2014; 20:00	Reixach 10	(15–12)	three players 5	Pavelló Blanc i Verd, Bordils; Attendance: 780; Referees: Iniesta Castillo, Soria Fabián
4 September 2014; 20:00	3× (yellow card) 5× (suspension)	Report	3× (yellow card) 6× (suspension)	Pavelló Blanc i Verd, Bordils; Attendance: 780; Referees: Iniesta Castillo, Soria Fabián

4 September 2014; 20:30	Atlético Valladolid	31–27	Bidasoa Irún	Polideportivo Huerta del Rey, Valladolid; Attendance: 1,500; Referees: Amigo Plaza, García de la Galana
4 September 2014; 20:30	three players 5	(16–14)	Muiña 7	Polideportivo Huerta del Rey, Valladolid; Attendance: 1,500; Referees: Amigo Plaza, García de la Galana
4 September 2014; 20:30	3× (yellow card) 3× (suspension)	Report	2× (yellow card) 7× (suspension)	Polideportivo Huerta del Rey, Valladolid; Attendance: 1,500; Referees: Amigo Plaza, García de la Galana

4 September 2014; 20:30	Teucro	43–35	Amenabar Zarautz	Pavillón Municipal, Pontevedra; Attendance: 780; Referees: Gallardo Cabello; Sergio & Francisco
4 September 2014; 20:30	Moledo 8	(27–18)	Balenciaga 9	Pavillón Municipal, Pontevedra; Attendance: 780; Referees: Gallardo Cabello; Sergio & Francisco
4 September 2014; 20:30	3× (yellow card) 5× (suspension) 1× (red card)	Report	1× (yellow card) 4× (suspension)	Pavillón Municipal, Pontevedra; Attendance: 780; Referees: Gallardo Cabello; Sergio & Francisco

5 September 2014; 12:00	Interstar Deporte Algemesí	34–31 (a.e.t.)	Academia Octavio	Pabellón 9 d'Octubre, Algemesí; Attendance: 500; Referees: Mendoza Roldán, Visciarelli Lareo
5 September 2014; 12:00	Lorasque 8	(13–13)	Hermida 8	Pabellón 9 d'Octubre, Algemesí; Attendance: 500; Referees: Mendoza Roldán, Visciarelli Lareo
5 September 2014; 12:00	3× (yellow card) 3× (suspension) 1× (red card)	Report	3× (yellow card) 3× (suspension)	Pabellón 9 d'Octubre, Algemesí; Attendance: 500; Referees: Mendoza Roldán, Visciarelli Lareo

5 September 2014; 12:00	Zumosol ARS Palma del Río	31–30	Go Fit	Polideportivo El Pandero, Palma del Río; Attendance: 500; Referees: García Sánchez, Vinagre Vázquez
5 September 2014; 12:00	Teixeira 12	(13–16)	Ros, Jorajuría 6	Polideportivo El Pandero, Palma del Río; Attendance: 500; Referees: García Sánchez, Vinagre Vázquez
5 September 2014; 12:00	3× (yellow card) 6× (suspension)	Report	3× (yellow card) 6× (suspension)	Polideportivo El Pandero, Palma del Río; Attendance: 500; Referees: García Sánchez, Vinagre Vázquez

Teams qualified to next round
Viveros Herol Nava	FC Barcelona B	La Roca	Bordils
Atlético Valladolid	Teucro	Interstar Deporte Algemesí	Zumosol ARS Palma del Río

== Second round ==
Matches were played on 22 October 2014.

All times are CET.

Team 1	Score	Team 2
Bordils (Catalonia)	28–29	(Valencian Community) Benidorm
Interstar Deporte Algemesí (Valencian Community)	26–35	(Valencian Community) Fertiberia Puerto Sagunto
Viveros Herol Nava (Castile and León)	24–34	(Castile and León) Villa de Aranda
Zumosol ARS Palma del Río (Andalusia)	20–27	(Asturias) Juanfersa Grupo Fegar
FC Barcelona B (Catalonia)	32–30	(Galicia (Spain)) Frigoríficos del Morrazo
La Roca (Catalonia)	25–31	(Castile and León) MMT Seguros Zamora
Teucro (Galicia (Spain))	28–31	(Andalusia) Ángel Ximénez Puente Genil
Atlético Valladolid (Castile and León)	29–27	(Aragon) Aragón

=== Matches ===
22 October 2014; 19:30	FC Barcelona B	32–30	Frigoríficos del Morrazo	Ciutat Esportiva Joan Gamper, Sant Joan Despí; Attendance: 600; Referees: Álvarez Mata, Bustamante López
22 October 2014; 19:30	Amigó 7	(19–13)	D García 5	Ciutat Esportiva Joan Gamper, Sant Joan Despí; Attendance: 600; Referees: Álvarez Mata, Bustamante López
22 October 2014; 19:30	2× (suspension)	Report	2× (suspension)	Ciutat Esportiva Joan Gamper, Sant Joan Despí; Attendance: 600; Referees: Álvarez Mata, Bustamante López

22 October 2014; 20:30	Atlético Valladolid	29–27	Aragón	Polideportivo Huerta del Rey, Valladolid; Attendance: 750; Referees: Hermoso del Amo, Monjo Ortega
22 October 2014; 20:30	F Hernández 10	(16–16)	A Val 5	Polideportivo Huerta del Rey, Valladolid; Attendance: 750; Referees: Hermoso del Amo, Monjo Ortega
22 October 2014; 20:30	1× (yellow card) 2× (suspension)	Report	3× (yellow card) 3× (suspension) 1× (red card)	Polideportivo Huerta del Rey, Valladolid; Attendance: 750; Referees: Hermoso del Amo, Monjo Ortega

22 October 2014; 20:30	La Roca	25–31	MMT Seguros Zamora	Pavelló Nou, La Roca del Vallès; Attendance: 500; Referees: Luque Cabrejas, Pascual Sánchez
22 October 2014; 20:30	M Sánchez 6	(12–14)	J Martín, Camino 6	Pavelló Nou, La Roca del Vallès; Attendance: 500; Referees: Luque Cabrejas, Pascual Sánchez
22 October 2014; 20:30	3× (yellow card)	Report	3× (yellow card) 3× (suspension)	Pavelló Nou, La Roca del Vallès; Attendance: 500; Referees: Luque Cabrejas, Pascual Sánchez

22 October 2014; 20:45	Teucro	28–31	Ángel Ximénez Puente Genil	Pavillón Municipal, Pontevedra; Attendance: 500; Referees: Merino Mori, Moyano Prieto
22 October 2014; 20:45	Pichel 6	(14–15)	Chispi 9	Pavillón Municipal, Pontevedra; Attendance: 500; Referees: Merino Mori, Moyano Prieto
22 October 2014; 20:45	2× (suspension)	Report	3× (suspension)	Pavillón Municipal, Pontevedra; Attendance: 500; Referees: Merino Mori, Moyano Prieto

22 October 2014; 21:00	Bordils	28–29	Benidorm	Pavelló Blanc i Verd, Bordils; Attendance: 700; Referees: Ballano Dueñas, Rodríguez Rodríguez
22 October 2014; 21:00	Canyigueral 7	(14–16)	Grau, O Río 6	Pavelló Blanc i Verd, Bordils; Attendance: 700; Referees: Ballano Dueñas, Rodríguez Rodríguez
22 October 2014; 21:00	3× (suspension)	Report	5× (suspension) 1× (red card)	Pavelló Blanc i Verd, Bordils; Attendance: 700; Referees: Ballano Dueñas, Rodríguez Rodríguez

22 October 2014; 21:00	Interstar Deporte Algemesí	26–35	Fertiberia Puerto Sagunto	Pabellón 9 d'Octubre, Algemesí; Attendance: 210; Referees: García Serradilla, Marín Lorente
22 October 2014; 21:00	Borras 6	(14–15)	Nacho Plaza 6	Pabellón 9 d'Octubre, Algemesí; Attendance: 210; Referees: García Serradilla, Marín Lorente
22 October 2014; 21:00	2× (yellow card) 2× (suspension)	Report	3× (yellow card) 4× (suspension)	Pabellón 9 d'Octubre, Algemesí; Attendance: 210; Referees: García Serradilla, Marín Lorente

22 October 2014; 21:00	Viveros Herol Nava	24–34	Villa de Aranda	Polideportivo Municipal, Nava de la Asunción; Attendance: 1,000; Referees: García Mosquera, Muro San José
22 October 2014; 21:00	D Fernández 7	(12–19)	Patrianova 8	Polideportivo Municipal, Nava de la Asunción; Attendance: 1,000; Referees: García Mosquera, Muro San José
22 October 2014; 21:00	3× (yellow card) 3× (suspension)	Report	3× (yellow card) 7× (suspension) 1× (red card)	Polideportivo Municipal, Nava de la Asunción; Attendance: 1,000; Referees: García Mosquera, Muro San José

22 October 2014; 21:00	Zumosol ARS Palma del Río	20–27	Juanfersa Grupo Fegar	Polideportivo El Pandero, Palma del Río; Attendance: 250; Referees: Miranda Bedate, San Pedro Colorado
22 October 2014; 21:00	Dijá 7	(9–10)	Paredes 7	Polideportivo El Pandero, Palma del Río; Attendance: 250; Referees: Miranda Bedate, San Pedro Colorado
22 October 2014; 21:00	3× (yellow card) 4× (suspension)	Report	3× (yellow card) 3× (suspension)	Polideportivo El Pandero, Palma del Río; Attendance: 250; Referees: Miranda Bedate, San Pedro Colorado

Teams qualified to next round
FC Barcelona B	Atlético Valladolid	MMT Seguros Zamora	Ángel Ximénez Puente Genil
Benidorm	Fertiberia Puerto Sagunto	Villa de Aranda	Juanfersa Grupo Fegar

== Round of 16 ==
The draw was conducted on 24 October 2014. Matches were to be played on 5 November.

Team 1	Score	Team 2
FC Barcelona B (Catalonia)	31–36 (a.e.t.)	(Castile and León) ABANCA Ademar León
Benidorm (Valencian Community)	34–35 (a.e.t.)	Naturhouse La Rioja
Villa de Aranda (Castile and León)	34–25	(Navarre) Helvetia Anaitasuna
Ángel Ximénez P. Genil (Andalusia)	35–34	(Castilla–La Mancha) BM Guadalajara
Juanfersa Gijón (Asturias)	31–29	(Castilla–La Mancha) Globalcaja C. Encantada
Atlético Valladolid (Castile and León)	31–34	(Aragon) Bada Huesca
Fertiberia Puerto Sagunto (Valencian Community)	31–45	(Catalonia) FC Barcelona
MMT Seguros Zamora (Castile and León)	24–31	(Catalonia) Fraikin Granollers

=== Matches ===
4 November 2014; 20:15	Fertiberia Puerto Sagunto	31–45	FC Barcelona	Pabellón Polideportivo Internúcleos, Puerto Sagunto; Attendance: 1,500; Referees: García Mosquera, Muro San José
4 November 2014; 20:15	Pocholo, V Álvarez	(16–22)	Entrerríos, Lazarov 7	Pabellón Polideportivo Internúcleos, Puerto Sagunto; Attendance: 1,500; Referees: García Mosquera, Muro San José
4 November 2014; 20:15	3× (yellow card) 1× (suspension)	Report	3× (yellow card) 1× (suspension)	Pabellón Polideportivo Internúcleos, Puerto Sagunto; Attendance: 1,500; Referees: García Mosquera, Muro San José

5 November 2014; 19:30	FC Barcelona B	31–36 (a.e.t.)	ABANCA Ademar León	Ciutat Esportiva Joan Gamper, Sant Joan Despí; Attendance: 700; Referees: Casado Fernández, Vera Ávila
5 November 2014; 19:30	Sáez 11	(14–14)	Carrillo 7	Ciutat Esportiva Joan Gamper, Sant Joan Despí; Attendance: 700; Referees: Casado Fernández, Vera Ávila
5 November 2014; 19:30	1× (suspension)	Report	5× (suspension)	Ciutat Esportiva Joan Gamper, Sant Joan Despí; Attendance: 700; Referees: Casado Fernández, Vera Ávila

5 November 2014; 20:30	Atlético Valladolid	31–34	Bada Huesca	Polideportivo Huerta del Rey, Valladolid; Attendance: 1,200; Referees: Merino Mori, Moyano Prieto
5 November 2014; 20:30	F Hernández 13	(16–18)	Cartón 10	Polideportivo Huerta del Rey, Valladolid; Attendance: 1,200; Referees: Merino Mori, Moyano Prieto
5 November 2014; 20:30	1× (yellow card) 4× (suspension)	Report	3× (yellow card) 6× (suspension)	Polideportivo Huerta del Rey, Valladolid; Attendance: 1,200; Referees: Merino Mori, Moyano Prieto

5 November 2014; 20:30	Juanfersa Gijón	31–29	Globalcaja C. Encantada	Palacio de Deportes, Gijón; Attendance: 450; Referees: Álvarez Mata, Bustamante López
5 November 2014; 20:30	A Fernández 7	(15–13)	Marchán 7	Palacio de Deportes, Gijón; Attendance: 450; Referees: Álvarez Mata, Bustamante López
5 November 2014; 20:30	3× (yellow card) 3× (suspension)	Report	2× (yellow card) 3× (suspension)	Palacio de Deportes, Gijón; Attendance: 450; Referees: Álvarez Mata, Bustamante López

5 November 2014; 20:30	Villa de Aranda	34–25	Helvetia Anaitasuna	Príncipe de Asturias, Aranda de Duero; Attendance: 1,000; Referees: Fernández Fernández, Martín Franco
5 November 2014; 20:30	Pažin 8	(21–13)	Reig 6	Príncipe de Asturias, Aranda de Duero; Attendance: 1,000; Referees: Fernández Fernández, Martín Franco
5 November 2014; 20:30	3× (yellow card) 6× (suspension)	Report	2× (yellow card) 3× (suspension)	Príncipe de Asturias, Aranda de Duero; Attendance: 1,000; Referees: Fernández Fernández, Martín Franco

5 November 2014; 20:45	Ángel Ximénez P. Genil	35–34	BM Guadalajara	Alcalde Miguel Salas, Puente Genil; Attendance: 700; Referees: García Serradilla, Marín Lorente
5 November 2014; 20:45	Chispi 13	(19–15)	Chiuffa 8	Alcalde Miguel Salas, Puente Genil; Attendance: 700; Referees: García Serradilla, Marín Lorente
5 November 2014; 20:45	3× (yellow card) 2× (suspension)	Report	3× (yellow card) 2× (suspension)	Alcalde Miguel Salas, Puente Genil; Attendance: 700; Referees: García Serradilla, Marín Lorente

5 November 2014; 20:45	Benidorm	34–35 (a.e.t.)	Naturhouse La Rioja	Palau d'Esports L'Illa, Benidorm; Attendance: 1,000; Referees: Luque Cabrejas, Pascual Sánchez
5 November 2014; 20:45	D Jiménez 9	(15–16)	Luisfe 8	Palau d'Esports L'Illa, Benidorm; Attendance: 1,000; Referees: Luque Cabrejas, Pascual Sánchez
5 November 2014; 20:45	3× (yellow card) 3× (suspension)	Report	2× (yellow card) 2× (suspension)	Palau d'Esports L'Illa, Benidorm; Attendance: 1,000; Referees: Luque Cabrejas, Pascual Sánchez

5 November 2014; 21:00	MMT Seguros Zamora	24–31	Fraikin Granollers	Ángel Nieto, Zamora; Attendance: 1,300; Referees: Hermoso del Amo, Monjo Ortega
5 November 2014; 21:00	Magadán 7	(10–11)	Solé 10	Ángel Nieto, Zamora; Attendance: 1,300; Referees: Hermoso del Amo, Monjo Ortega
5 November 2014; 21:00	3× (yellow card) 5× (suspension)	Report	3× (yellow card) 5× (suspension) 1× (red card)	Ángel Nieto, Zamora; Attendance: 1,300; Referees: Hermoso del Amo, Monjo Ortega

Teams qualified to next round
FC Barcelona	ABANCA Ademar León	Bada Huesca	Juanfersa Gijón
Villa de Aranda	Ángel Ximénez P. Genil	Naturhouse La Rioja	Fraikin Granollers

== Quarter finals ==
The quarter final's draw was conducted on 20 December during ASOBAL's general meeting in León. This round was due to play over two legs. The matches were scheduled for 4 February 2015 (1st leg) and 1 April (2nd leg).

All times are CET.

Team 1	Agg.	Team 2	1st leg	2nd leg
FC Barcelona (Catalonia)	74–57	Naturhouse La Rioja	39–28	35–29
ABANCA Ademar León (Castile and León)	60–63	(Catalonia) Fraikin Granollers	28–28	32–35
Bada Huesca (Aragon)	48–48 (a)	(Asturias) Juanfersa Gijón	26–25	22–23
Ángel Ximénez P. Genil (Andalusia)	50–47	(Castile and León) BLAS-GON Villa de Aranda	29–24	21–23

=== Matches ===
==== First leg ====
4 February 2015; 20:00 (UTC+1)	Bada Huesca	26–25	Juanfersa Gijón	Palacio Municipal, Huesca; Attendance: 650; Referees: Fernández Pérez, García Rodríguez
4 February 2015; 20:00 (UTC+1)	A Cartón 7	(14–12)	Rial 9	Palacio Municipal, Huesca; Attendance: 650; Referees: Fernández Pérez, García Rodríguez
4 February 2015; 20:00 (UTC+1)	3× (yellow card) 5× (suspension)	Report	2× (yellow card) 4× (suspension)	Palacio Municipal, Huesca; Attendance: 650; Referees: Fernández Pérez, García Rodríguez

4 February 2015; 20:45 (UTC+1)	ABANCA Ademar León	28–28	Fraikin Granollers	Palacio de los Deportes, León; Attendance: 1,300; Referees: García Mosquera, Muro San José
4 February 2015; 20:45 (UTC+1)	Silva, Aguirrezabalaga 7	(13–14)	Solé 8	Palacio de los Deportes, León; Attendance: 1,300; Referees: García Mosquera, Muro San José
4 February 2015; 20:45 (UTC+1)	3× (yellow card) 3× (suspension)	Report	3× (yellow card) 1× (suspension)	Palacio de los Deportes, León; Attendance: 1,300; Referees: García Mosquera, Muro San José

4 February 2015; 20:45 (UTC+1)	Ángel Ximénez P. Genil	29–24	BLAS-GON Villa de Aranda	Alcalde Miguel Salas, Puente Genil; Attendance: 400; Referees: Luque Cabrejas, Pascual Sánchez
4 February 2015; 20:45 (UTC+1)	Cuenca 7	(15–11)	Cabanas 5	Alcalde Miguel Salas, Puente Genil; Attendance: 400; Referees: Luque Cabrejas, Pascual Sánchez
4 February 2015; 20:45 (UTC+1)	3× (yellow card) 7× (suspension) 1× (red card)	Report	3× (yellow card) 5× (suspension)	Alcalde Miguel Salas, Puente Genil; Attendance: 400; Referees: Luque Cabrejas, Pascual Sánchez

4 February 2015; 21:00 (UTC+1)	FC Barcelona	39–28	Naturhouse La Rioja	Palau Blaugrana, Barcelona; Attendance: 914; Referees: Álvarez Mata, Bustamante López
4 February 2015; 21:00 (UTC+1)	Rutenka 9	(20–13)	Luisfe 5	Palau Blaugrana, Barcelona; Attendance: 914; Referees: Álvarez Mata, Bustamante López
4 February 2015; 21:00 (UTC+1)	2× (yellow card) 2× (suspension)	Report	3× (yellow card) 1× (suspension)	Palau Blaugrana, Barcelona; Attendance: 914; Referees: Álvarez Mata, Bustamante López

==== Second leg ====
1 April 2015; 20:30 (UTC+2)	Fraikin Granollers	35–32	ABANCA Ademar León	Palau d'Esports, Granollers; Attendance: 1,200; Referees: García Mosquera, Muro San José
1 April 2015; 20:30 (UTC+2)	del Arco 10	(12–15)	Carrillo 10	Palau d'Esports, Granollers; Attendance: 1,200; Referees: García Mosquera, Muro San José
1 April 2015; 20:30 (UTC+2)	3× (yellow card) 3× (suspension)	Report	3× (yellow card) 5× (suspension) 1× (red card)	Palau d'Esports, Granollers; Attendance: 1,200; Referees: García Mosquera, Muro San José

1 April 2015; 20:30 (UTC+2)	Juanfersa Gijón	23–22	Bada Huesca	Palacio de Deportes, Gijón; Attendance: 1,500; Referees: García Serradilla, Marín Lorente
1 April 2015; 20:30 (UTC+2)	Paraja 6	(14–11)	Dijá 6	Palacio de Deportes, Gijón; Attendance: 1,500; Referees: García Serradilla, Marín Lorente
1 April 2015; 20:30 (UTC+2)	3× (yellow card) 0× (suspension)	Report	2× (yellow card) 3× (suspension)	Palacio de Deportes, Gijón; Attendance: 1,500; Referees: García Serradilla, Marín Lorente

1 April 2015; 20:45 (UTC+2)	Naturhouse La Rioja	29–35	FC Barcelona	Palacio de los Deportes, Logroño; Attendance: 2,500; Referees: Ballano Dueñas, Belloso Pérez
1 April 2015; 20:45 (UTC+2)	Luisfe, Fernández 5	(14–18)		Palacio de los Deportes, Logroño; Attendance: 2,500; Referees: Ballano Dueñas, Belloso Pérez
1 April 2015; 20:45 (UTC+2)	3× (yellow card) 2× (suspension)	Report	2× (yellow card) 5× (suspension)	Palacio de los Deportes, Logroño; Attendance: 2,500; Referees: Ballano Dueñas, Belloso Pérez

1 April 2015; 21:00 (UTC+2)	BLAS-GON Villa de Aranda	23–21	Ángel Ximénez P. Genil	Polideportivo Príncipe de Asturias, Aranda de Duero; Attendance: 2,200; Referees: Álvarez Mata, Bustamante López
1 April 2015; 21:00 (UTC+2)	Cabanas, Maestro 5	(13–8)	Moya 5	Polideportivo Príncipe de Asturias, Aranda de Duero; Attendance: 2,200; Referees: Álvarez Mata, Bustamante López
1 April 2015; 21:00 (UTC+2)	3× (yellow card) 6× (suspension)	Report	1× (yellow card) 4× (suspension) 1× (red card)	Polideportivo Príncipe de Asturias, Aranda de Duero; Attendance: 2,200; Referees: Álvarez Mata, Bustamante López

Teams qualified to Final Four
Fraikin Granollers	Juanfersa Gijón
FC Barcelona	Ángel Ximénez P. Genil

== Final four ==
The Final Four was played during days 6 and 7 June at Palacio de Deportes in Gijón, Asturias. The draw was conducted on May 14. One place to the 2015–16 EHF Cup was given to the champion. As FC Barcelona and Fraikin Granollers qualified to European competitions through the 2014–15 Liga ASOBAL, Juanfersa Gijón and Ángel Ximénez Puente Genil can qualify if they at least win the semifinals. If both teams lose their match, the fifth qualified in Liga ASOBAL would play EHF Cup.

Semifinals
(Catalonia) FC Barcelona	34
(Andalusia) Ángel Ximénez Puente Genil	23
(Asturias) Juanfersa Gijón	26
(Catalonia) Fraikin Granollers	28

Final
(Catalonia) FC Barcelona	27
(Catalonia) Fraikin Granollers	26

=== Semifinals ===
6 June; 16:30 (UTC+2)	FC Barcelona	34–23	Ángel Ximénez Puente Genil	Palacio de Deportes, Gijón; Attendance: 3,000; Referees: Jesús Escudero, Jorge Escudero
6 June; 16:30 (UTC+2)	V Tomás 8	(15–12)	Vázquez 5	Palacio de Deportes, Gijón; Attendance: 3,000; Referees: Jesús Escudero, Jorge Escudero
6 June; 16:30 (UTC+2)	2× (yellow card) 5× (suspension)	Report	2× (yellow card) 4× (suspension)	Palacio de Deportes, Gijón; Attendance: 3,000; Referees: Jesús Escudero, Jorge Escudero

6 June; 18:30 (UTC+2)	Juanfersa Gijón	26–28	Fraikin Granollers	Palacio de Deportes, Gijón; Attendance: 3,000; Referees: José Luis Vinagre, Juan Manuel Vinagre
6 June; 18:30 (UTC+2)	Paraja 5	(15–12)	Toledo, del Arco 7	Palacio de Deportes, Gijón; Attendance: 3,000; Referees: José Luis Vinagre, Juan Manuel Vinagre
6 June; 18:30 (UTC+2)	3× (yellow card) 3× (suspension) 1× (red card)	Report	2× (yellow card) 1× (suspension)	Palacio de Deportes, Gijón; Attendance: 3,000; Referees: José Luis Vinagre, Juan Manuel Vinagre

=== Final ===
7 June; 17:30 (UTC+2)	FC Barcelona	27–26	Fraikin Granollers	Palacio de Deportes, Gijón; Attendance: 3,000; Referees: Raluy López, Sabroso Ramírez
7 June; 17:30 (UTC+2)	V Tomás 7	(15–14)	Solé 5	Palacio de Deportes, Gijón; Attendance: 3,000; Referees: Raluy López, Sabroso Ramírez
7 June; 17:30 (UTC+2)	2× (yellow card) 2× (suspension) 1× (red card)	Report	3× (yellow card) 4× (suspension)	Palacio de Deportes, Gijón; Attendance: 3,000; Referees: Raluy López, Sabroso Ramírez

2014–15 Copa del Rey de Balonmano winners
(Catalonia)
FC Barcelona
Nineteenth title

== See also ==
- Liga ASOBAL 2014–15
