= 2013–14 Copa del Rey de Balonmano =

2013–14 Copa del Rey
XXXIX Copa del Rey 2013–14

Tournament details
- Dates: October 19, 2013 – May 4, 2014
- Teams: 32

Final positions
- Champions: FC Barcelona (18th title)
- Runners-up: Fraikin Granollers

Tournament statistics
- Matches played: 35
- Goals scored: 1,966 (56.17 per match)
- Attendance: 32,627 (932 per match)
- Top scorers: Kiril Lazarov, 30

The Copa del Rey de Balonmano 2013–14 is the 39th edition of the Copa del Rey de Balonmano, hosted by Liga ASOBAL. The tournament began on 19 and 20 October with First Round matches.

Atlético Madrid is the defending champion but it will be unable to defend its title as the club was shut down in July 2013.

FC Barcelona won its eighteenth Copa del Rey title, and the first after four years (last in 2010) by defeating BM Granollers 42–32 in the Final.

== Competition format ==
=== Knockout stage ===
- First round (single match)
- Second round (single match)
- Round of 16 (single match)
- Quarter-final (two legs)

=== Final four ===
- Semifinals (single match)
- Final (single match)

== Calendar ==
Round	Date	Fixtures	Clubs	Notes
First round	19/20 October 2013	8	16 → 16	División de Plata teams gain entry
Second round	6/7 November 2013	8	16 → 16	8 Liga ASOBAL teams teams gain entry
Round of 16	10/11/12 December 2013	8	16 → 8	8 Liga ASOBAL teams teams gain entry
Quarter-finals	26 February 2014	8	8 → 4	
Quarter-finals	5 March 2014	8	8 → 4	
Final Four	3/4 May 2014	3	4 → 1	

== First round ==
Matches played on 19 and 20 October 2013.

All times are CEST.

Team 1	Score	Team 2
Amenabar Zarautz (Basque Country (autonomous community))	27–36	(Catalonia) FC Barcelona B
Servigroup Benidorm (Valencian Community)	22–24	(Galicia (Spain)) Teucro
MMT Seguros Zamora (Castile and León)	27–31	(Cantabria) Go Fit Sinfín
Meridiano Antequera (Andalusia)	33–22	(Community of Madrid) Alcobendas
Ereintza Aguaplast (Basque Country (autonomous community))	28–32	(Andalusia) ARS Palma del Río
Solla & Cía Chapela (Galicia (Spain))	29–31	(Andalusia) Pozoblanco
Calmec Barakaldo (Basque Country (autonomous community))	27–30	(Cantabria) Torrelavega
Bordils (Catalonia)	31–22	(Galicia (Spain)) Academia Octavio

=== Matches ===
19 October 2013; 17:45	Amenabar Zarautz	27–33	FC Barcelona B	Polideportivo Municipal, Zarautz; Attendance: 700; Referees: Pérez Domínguez, Pérez Outeda
19 October 2013; 17:45	Balenciaga 7	(13–19)	Sáez 8	Polideportivo Municipal, Zarautz; Attendance: 700; Referees: Pérez Domínguez, Pérez Outeda
19 October 2013; 17:45	2× (yellow card) 3× (suspension)	Report	2× (yellow card) 4× (suspension)	Polideportivo Municipal, Zarautz; Attendance: 700; Referees: Pérez Domínguez, Pérez Outeda

19 October 2013; 18:00	MMT Seguros Zamora	27–31	Go Fit Sinfín	Polideportivo Manuel Camba, Zamora; Attendance: 450; Referees: Ruiz González, Zapico Fernández
19 October 2013; 18:00	Martín 6	(16–17)	Álvarez 9	Polideportivo Manuel Camba, Zamora; Attendance: 450; Referees: Ruiz González, Zapico Fernández
19 October 2013; 18:00	3× (yellow card) 4× (suspension)	Report	3× (yellow card) 6× (suspension)	Polideportivo Manuel Camba, Zamora; Attendance: 450; Referees: Ruiz González, Zapico Fernández

19 October 2013; 18:30	Meridiano Antequera	33–22	Alcobendas	Pabellón Fernando Argüelles, Antequera; Attendance: 450; Referees: Fraile Muñoz, Peris Orts
19 October 2013; 18:30	Río 6	(18–12)	de la Rubia 7	Pabellón Fernando Argüelles, Antequera; Attendance: 450; Referees: Fraile Muñoz, Peris Orts
19 October 2013; 18:30	3× (yellow card) 5× (suspension)	Report	3× (yellow card) 4× (suspension) 1× (red card)	Pabellón Fernando Argüelles, Antequera; Attendance: 450; Referees: Fraile Muñoz, Peris Orts

19 October 2013; 18:30	Solla & Cía Chapela	29–31	Pozoblanco	Pabellón Municipal, Chapela; Attendance: 730; Referees: Gutiérrez Quintano, Elordui Elorrieta
19 October 2013; 18:30	three players 6	(8–14)	Requena 11	Pabellón Municipal, Chapela; Attendance: 730; Referees: Gutiérrez Quintano, Elordui Elorrieta
19 October 2013; 18:30	2× (yellow card) 6× (suspension)	Report	3× (yellow card) 2× (suspension)	Pabellón Municipal, Chapela; Attendance: 730; Referees: Gutiérrez Quintano, Elordui Elorrieta

19 October 2013; 19:00	Calmec Barakaldo	27–30	Torrelavega	Polideportivo Lasesarre, Barakaldo; Attendance: 327; Referees: Rodríguez Mondelo, Portela Fernández
19 October 2013; 19:00	García, Paredes 6	(11–13)	J Marcos, Calderón 9	Polideportivo Lasesarre, Barakaldo; Attendance: 327; Referees: Rodríguez Mondelo, Portela Fernández
19 October 2013; 19:00	2× (yellow card) 5× (suspension)	Report	2× (yellow card) 4× (suspension) 1× (red card)	Polideportivo Lasesarre, Barakaldo; Attendance: 327; Referees: Rodríguez Mondelo, Portela Fernández

19 October 2013; 19:30	Ereintza Aguaplast	28–32	ARS Palma del Río	Polideportivo Galtzaraborda, Errenteria; Attendance: 400; Referees: Peñaranda Ortega, Yagüe Moros
19 October 2013; 19:30	J Imanol, Gimeno 6	(14–17)	Cruz, Martínez 8	Polideportivo Galtzaraborda, Errenteria; Attendance: 400; Referees: Peñaranda Ortega, Yagüe Moros
19 October 2013; 19:30	3× (yellow card) 3× (suspension)	Report	3× (yellow card) 6× (suspension)	Polideportivo Galtzaraborda, Errenteria; Attendance: 400; Referees: Peñaranda Ortega, Yagüe Moros

19 October 2013; 20:00	Bordils	31–22	Academia Octavio	Pavelló Blanc i Verd, Bordils; Attendance: 500; Referees: Fernández Molina, Murillo Castro
19 October 2013; 20:00	Nonó 7	(16–10)	Cerillo 7	Pavelló Blanc i Verd, Bordils; Attendance: 500; Referees: Fernández Molina, Murillo Castro
19 October 2013; 20:00	3× (yellow card) 4× (suspension)	Report	3× (yellow card) 7× (suspension)	Pavelló Blanc i Verd, Bordils; Attendance: 500; Referees: Fernández Molina, Murillo Castro

20 October 2013; 12:30	Servigroup Benidorm	22–24	Teucro	Palau d'Esports L'Illa, Benidorm; Attendance: 320; Referees: Ausàs Busquet, Florenza Virgili
20 October 2013; 12:30	Hernández, D Jiménez 5	(11–12)	Chapela 6	Palau d'Esports L'Illa, Benidorm; Attendance: 320; Referees: Ausàs Busquet, Florenza Virgili
20 October 2013; 12:30	3× (yellow card) 5× (suspension) 1× (red card)	Report	3× (yellow card) 4× (suspension)	Palau d'Esports L'Illa, Benidorm; Attendance: 320; Referees: Ausàs Busquet, Florenza Virgili

Teams qualified to next round
FC Barcelona B	Go Fit Sinfín	Meridiano Antequera	Pozoblanco
Torrelavega	ARS Palma del Río	Bordils	Teucro

== Second round ==
Matches played on 6 and 7 November 2013.

All times are CET.

Team 1	Score	Team 2
ARS Palma del Río (Andalusia)	21–39	(Castilla–La Mancha) Globalcaja C. Encantada
Teucro (Galicia (Spain))	32–32 (a.e.t.) (4–3p)	(Castile and León) Cuatro Rayas Valladolid
Torrelavega (Cantabria)	19–23	(Asturias) Juanfersa Grupo Fegar
FC Barcelona B (Catalonia)	23–21	(Basque Country (autonomous community)) Bidasoa Irun
Pozoblanco (Andalusia)	25–35	(Castile and León) Villa de Aranda Top Ribera
Go Fit Sinfín (Cantabria)	16–25	(Castilla–La Mancha) BM Guadalajara
Meridiano Antequera (Andalusia)	31–32	(Andalusia) Ángel Ximénez
Bordils (Catalonia)	23–32	(Galicia (Spain)) Frigoríficos del Morrazo

=== Matches ===
6 November 2013; 19:00	FC Barcelona B	23–21	Bidasoa Irun	Ciutat Esportiva Joan Gamper, Sant Joan Despí; Attendance: 400; Referees: Hermoso del Amo, Monjo Ortega
6 November 2013; 19:00	Sáez 5	(13–9)	Azkue, Milošević 5	Ciutat Esportiva Joan Gamper, Sant Joan Despí; Attendance: 400; Referees: Hermoso del Amo, Monjo Ortega
6 November 2013; 19:00	4× (suspension)	Report	3× (suspension)	Ciutat Esportiva Joan Gamper, Sant Joan Despí; Attendance: 400; Referees: Hermoso del Amo, Monjo Ortega

6 November 2013; 20:00	Go Fit Sinfín	16–25	BM Guadalajara	Pabellón de La Albericia, Santander; Attendance: 500; Referees: Gude Prego, Juan José & Carlos Javier
6 November 2013; 20:00	Mojo 6	(9–12)	Coke, Tchê Pozzer 5	Pabellón de La Albericia, Santander; Attendance: 500; Referees: Gude Prego, Juan José & Carlos Javier
6 November 2013; 20:00	3× (suspension)	Report	6× (suspension) 1× (red card)	Pabellón de La Albericia, Santander; Attendance: 500; Referees: Gude Prego, Juan José & Carlos Javier

6 November 2013; 20:30	Teucro	32–32 (a.e.t.) (4–3 p)	Cuatro Rayas Valladolid	Pavillón Municipal, Pontevedra; Attendance: 600; Referees: Fernández Fernández, Martín Franco
6 November 2013; 20:30	C García 8	(12–10)	Corzo 6	Pavillón Municipal, Pontevedra; Attendance: 600; Referees: Fernández Fernández, Martín Franco
6 November 2013; 20:30	3× (suspension)	Report	5× (suspension)	Pavillón Municipal, Pontevedra; Attendance: 600; Referees: Fernández Fernández, Martín Franco

6 November 2013; 20:30	Torrelavega	19–23	Juanfersa Grupo Fegar	Pabellón Vicente Trueba, Torrelavega; Attendance: 800; Referees: Escudero Santiuste, Jesús & Jorge
6 November 2013; 20:30	A Pérez 5	(12–11)	M Cancio 6	Pabellón Vicente Trueba, Torrelavega; Attendance: 800; Referees: Escudero Santiuste, Jesús & Jorge
6 November 2013; 20:30		Report		Pabellón Vicente Trueba, Torrelavega; Attendance: 800; Referees: Escudero Santiuste, Jesús & Jorge

6 November 2013; 20:45	ARS Palma del Río	21–39	Globalcaja C. Encantada	Polideportivo El Pandero, Palma del Río; Attendance: 200; Referees: Casado Fernández, Vera Ávila
6 November 2013; 20:45	Dublino 7	(15–20)	A Pérez 7	Polideportivo El Pandero, Palma del Río; Attendance: 200; Referees: Casado Fernández, Vera Ávila
6 November 2013; 20:45	4× (suspension) 1× (red card)	Report	6× (suspension)	Polideportivo El Pandero, Palma del Río; Attendance: 200; Referees: Casado Fernández, Vera Ávila

6 November 2013; 20:45	Meridiano Antequera	31–32	Ángel Ximénez	Pabellón Fernando Argüelles, Antequera; Attendance: 1,100; Referees: Fernández Pérez, García Rodríguez
6 November 2013; 20:45	Río 9	(16–19)	Cuenca 9	Pabellón Fernando Argüelles, Antequera; Attendance: 1,100; Referees: Fernández Pérez, García Rodríguez
6 November 2013; 20:45	2× (suspension)	Report	3× (suspension)	Pabellón Fernando Argüelles, Antequera; Attendance: 1,100; Referees: Fernández Pérez, García Rodríguez

6 November 2013; 21:00	Pozoblanco	25–35	Villa de Aranda Top Ribera	Pabellón Juan Sepúlveda, Pozoblanco; Attendance: 300; Referees: García Mosquera, Vinagre Vázquez
6 November 2013; 21:00	Requena 7	(13–17)	Cabanas 7	Pabellón Juan Sepúlveda, Pozoblanco; Attendance: 300; Referees: García Mosquera, Vinagre Vázquez
6 November 2013; 21:00	4× (suspension)	Report	7× (suspension) 1× (red card)	Pabellón Juan Sepúlveda, Pozoblanco; Attendance: 300; Referees: García Mosquera, Vinagre Vázquez

7 November 2013; 20:30	Bordils	23–32	Frigoríficos del Morrazo	Pavelló Blanc i Verd, Bordils; Attendance: 1,000; Referees: García Serradilla, Marín Lorente
7 November 2013; 20:30	three players 4	(9–17)	Rosales 7	Pavelló Blanc i Verd, Bordils; Attendance: 1,000; Referees: García Serradilla, Marín Lorente
7 November 2013; 20:30	3× (yellow card)	Report	3× (yellow card) 5× (suspension)	Pavelló Blanc i Verd, Bordils; Attendance: 1,000; Referees: García Serradilla, Marín Lorente

Teams qualified to next round
FC Barcelona B	BM Guadalajara	Teucro	Juanfersa Grupo Fegar
Globalcaja C. Encantada	Ángel Ximénez	Villa de Aranda Top Ribera	Frigoríficos del Morrazo

== Round of 16 ==
Matches to be played on 11 December 2013.

All times are CET.

Team 1	Score	Team 2
FC Barcelona B (Catalonia)	35–35 (a.e.t.) (4–3p)	Naturhouse La Rioja
Frigoríficos del Morrazo (Galicia (Spain))	22–28	(Navarre) Helvetia Anaitasuna
Ángel Ximénez (Andalusia)	28–29	(Aragon) BM Aragón
Villa de Aranda Top Ribera (Castile and León)	26–39	(Catalonia) FC Barcelona
Juanfersa Grupo Fegar (Asturias)	31–28	(Castile and León) Reale Ademar León
Globalcaja C. Encantada (Castilla–La Mancha)	24–27	(Valencian Community) Fertiberia Puerto Sagunto
BM Guadalajara (Castilla–La Mancha)	26–32	(Aragon) BM Huesca
Teucro (Galicia (Spain))	22–23	(Catalonia) Fraikin Granollers

=== Matches ===
10 December 2013; 20:30	Globalcaja C. Encantada	24–27	Fertiberia Puerto Sagunto	Pabellón Polideportivo El Sargal, Cuenca; Attendance: 1,000; Referees: Ballano Dueñas, Belloso Pérez
10 December 2013; 20:30	Lipovina 5	(12–13)	Apelgren, Đukić 6	Pabellón Polideportivo El Sargal, Cuenca; Attendance: 1,000; Referees: Ballano Dueñas, Belloso Pérez
10 December 2013; 20:30	3× (yellow card) 2× (suspension)	Report	3× (yellow card) 4× (suspension)	Pabellón Polideportivo El Sargal, Cuenca; Attendance: 1,000; Referees: Ballano Dueñas, Belloso Pérez

10 December 2013; 20:30	Villa de Aranda Top Ribera	26–39	FC Barcelona	Pabellón Príncipe de Asturias, Aranda de Duero; Attendance: 600; Referees: García Mosquera, Ríos Martín
10 December 2013; 20:30	Sladič 6	(12–19)	three players 5	Pabellón Príncipe de Asturias, Aranda de Duero; Attendance: 600; Referees: García Mosquera, Ríos Martín
10 December 2013; 20:30	3× (yellow card) 4× (suspension)	Report	2× (yellow card) 1× (suspension)	Pabellón Príncipe de Asturias, Aranda de Duero; Attendance: 600; Referees: García Mosquera, Ríos Martín

11 December 2013; 19:00	FC Barcelona B	35–35 (a.e.t.) (4–3p)	Naturhouse La Rioja	Ciutat Esportiva Joan Gamper, Sant Joan Despí; Attendance: 800; Referees: Gracia Sánchez, Rodríguez Rodríguez
11 December 2013; 19:00	Montoya 9	(16–17)	Petrus 13	Ciutat Esportiva Joan Gamper, Sant Joan Despí; Attendance: 800; Referees: Gracia Sánchez, Rodríguez Rodríguez
11 December 2013; 19:00	3× (suspension)	Report	1× (suspension)	Ciutat Esportiva Joan Gamper, Sant Joan Despí; Attendance: 800; Referees: Gracia Sánchez, Rodríguez Rodríguez

11 December 2013; 20:00	BM Guadalajara	26–32	BM Huesca	Palacio Multiusos, Guadalajara; Attendance: 1,000; Referees: Hermoso del Amo, Monjo Ortega
11 December 2013; 20:00	three players 5	(16–13)	Marcelo 13	Palacio Multiusos, Guadalajara; Attendance: 1,000; Referees: Hermoso del Amo, Monjo Ortega
11 December 2013; 20:00	3× (yellow card) 3× (suspension)	Report	1× (yellow card) 6× (suspension)	Palacio Multiusos, Guadalajara; Attendance: 1,000; Referees: Hermoso del Amo, Monjo Ortega

11 December 2013; 20:30	Ángel Ximénez	28–29	BM Aragón	Pabellón Alcalde Miguel Salas, Puente Genil; Attendance: 500; Referees: Merino Mori, Moyano Prieto
11 December 2013; 20:30	Fuentes 7	(13–15)	A Pérez 12	Pabellón Alcalde Miguel Salas, Puente Genil; Attendance: 500; Referees: Merino Mori, Moyano Prieto
11 December 2013; 20:30	2× (yellow card) 2× (suspension)	Report	3× (yellow card) 1× (suspension)	Pabellón Alcalde Miguel Salas, Puente Genil; Attendance: 500; Referees: Merino Mori, Moyano Prieto

11 December 2013; 20:45	Frigoríficos del Morrazo	22–28	Helvetia Anaitasuna	Pabellón O Gatañal, Cangas do Morrazo; Attendance: 800; Referees: Muro San José, Rodríguez Murcia
11 December 2013; 20:45	three players 4	(9–12)	Reig 6	Pabellón O Gatañal, Cangas do Morrazo; Attendance: 800; Referees: Muro San José, Rodríguez Murcia
11 December 2013; 20:45	3× (yellow card) 4× (suspension)	Report	3× (yellow card) 5× (suspension)	Pabellón O Gatañal, Cangas do Morrazo; Attendance: 800; Referees: Muro San José, Rodríguez Murcia

11 December 2013; 20:45	Teucro	22–23	Fraikin Granollers	Pavillón Municipal, Pontevedra; Attendance: 1,600; Referees: Fernández Pérez, García Rodríguez
11 December 2013; 20:45	Pedreira 8	(11–13)	Salinas 6	Pavillón Municipal, Pontevedra; Attendance: 1,600; Referees: Fernández Pérez, García Rodríguez
11 December 2013; 20:45	5× (suspension)	Report	4× (suspension)	Pavillón Municipal, Pontevedra; Attendance: 1,600; Referees: Fernández Pérez, García Rodríguez

12 December 2013; 20:30	Juanfersa Grupo Fegar	31–28	Reale Ademar León	Palacio de Deportes, Gijón; Attendance: 1,200; Referees: Fernández Fernández, Martín Franco
12 December 2013; 20:30	Costoya 10	(14–15)	Tatarintsev 8	Palacio de Deportes, Gijón; Attendance: 1,200; Referees: Fernández Fernández, Martín Franco
12 December 2013; 20:30	1× (yellow card) 2× (suspension)	Report	2× (yellow card) 5× (suspension) 1× (red card)	Palacio de Deportes, Gijón; Attendance: 1,200; Referees: Fernández Fernández, Martín Franco

Teams qualified to next round
Fertiberia Puerto Sagunto	FC Barcelona	FC Barcelona B	BM Huesca
BM Aragón	Helvetia Anaitasuna	Fraikin Granollers	Juanfersa Grupo Fegar

== Quarter finals ==
Quarter finals draw was held on December 21 during the RFEBM general meeting in Barcelona. This round is to be played over two legs. The matches are scheduled to 26 February (1st leg) and 5 March 2014 (2nd leg).

All times are CET.

Team 1	Agg.	Team 2	1st leg	2nd leg
Fertiberia Puerto Sagunto (Valencian Community)	48–86	(Catalonia) FC Barcelona	21–42	27–44
BM Aragón (Aragon)	50–50 (a)	(Navarre) Helvetia Anaitasuna	29–29	21–21
FC Barcelona B (Catalonia)	59–64	(Aragon) BM Huesca	28–30	31–34
Fraikin Granollers (Catalonia)	53–31	(Asturias) Juanfersa Grupo Fegar	26–18	27–13

=== Matches ===
==== First leg ====
26 February 2014; 19:30 (UTC+1)	FC Barcelona B	28–30	BM Huesca	Ciutat Esportiva Joan Gamper, Sant Joan Despí; Attendance: 350; Referees: García Mosquera, Ríos Martín
26 February 2014; 19:30 (UTC+1)	Sáez 7	(15–14)	Molina 7	Ciutat Esportiva Joan Gamper, Sant Joan Despí; Attendance: 350; Referees: García Mosquera, Ríos Martín
26 February 2014; 19:30 (UTC+1)	2× (suspension)	Report	4× (suspension)	Ciutat Esportiva Joan Gamper, Sant Joan Despí; Attendance: 350; Referees: García Mosquera, Ríos Martín

26 February 2014; 20:15 (UTC+1)	Fertiberia Puerto Sagunto	21–42	FC Barcelona	Pabellón Polideportivo Internúcleos, Puerto de Sagunto; Attendance: 1,000; Referees: Hermoso del Amo, Monjo Ortega
26 February 2014; 20:15 (UTC+1)	N Plaza 4	(12–18)	J García, Lazarov 6	Pabellón Polideportivo Internúcleos, Puerto de Sagunto; Attendance: 1,000; Referees: Hermoso del Amo, Monjo Ortega
26 February 2014; 20:15 (UTC+1)	3× (yellow card) 1× (suspension)	Report	3× (yellow card) 1× (suspension)	Pabellón Polideportivo Internúcleos, Puerto de Sagunto; Attendance: 1,000; Referees: Hermoso del Amo, Monjo Ortega

26 February 2014; 20:45 (UTC+1)	BM Aragón	29–29	Helvetia Anaitasuna	Pabellón Príncipe Felipe, Zaragoza; Attendance: 300; Referees: García Serradilla, Marín Lorente
26 February 2014; 20:45 (UTC+1)	Lozano, del Valle 8	(17–12)	Bernatonis 6	Pabellón Príncipe Felipe, Zaragoza; Attendance: 300; Referees: García Serradilla, Marín Lorente
26 February 2014; 20:45 (UTC+1)	3× (yellow card) 4× (suspension)	Report	3× (yellow card) 2× (suspension)	Pabellón Príncipe Felipe, Zaragoza; Attendance: 300; Referees: García Serradilla, Marín Lorente

26 February 2014; 20:55 (UTC+1)	Fraikin Granollers	26–18	Juanfersa Grupo Fegar	Palau d'Esports, Granollers; Attendance: 1,000; Referees: Escudero Santiuste, Jesús & Jorge
26 February 2014; 20:55 (UTC+1)	Ruiz 7	(13–9)	Pellitero 3	Palau d'Esports, Granollers; Attendance: 1,000; Referees: Escudero Santiuste, Jesús & Jorge
26 February 2014; 20:55 (UTC+1)	2× (yellow card) 2× (suspension)	Report	3× (yellow card) 2× (suspension)	Palau d'Esports, Granollers; Attendance: 1,000; Referees: Escudero Santiuste, Jesús & Jorge

==== Second leg ====
4 March 2014; 20:00 (UTC+1)	FC Barcelona	44–27	Fertiberia Puerto Sagunto	Palau Blaugrana, Barcelona; Attendance: 900; Referees: Luque Cabrejas, Pascual Sánchez
4 March 2014; 20:00 (UTC+1)	J García 9	(19–12)	Berrios 7	Palau Blaugrana, Barcelona; Attendance: 900; Referees: Luque Cabrejas, Pascual Sánchez
4 March 2014; 20:00 (UTC+1)	3× (yellow card) 3× (suspension)	Report	2× (yellow card) 4× (suspension) 1× (red card)	Palau Blaugrana, Barcelona; Attendance: 900; Referees: Luque Cabrejas, Pascual Sánchez

5 March 2014; 20:00 (UTC+1)	Helvetia Anaitasuna	21–21	BM Aragón	Pabellón Anaitasuna, Pamplona; Attendance: 2,000; Referees: Raluy López, Sabroso Ramírez
5 March 2014; 20:00 (UTC+1)	Nadoveza 7	(8–12)	Cartón 5	Pabellón Anaitasuna, Pamplona; Attendance: 2,000; Referees: Raluy López, Sabroso Ramírez
5 March 2014; 20:00 (UTC+1)	3× (yellow card) 5× (suspension) 1× (red card)	Report	3× (yellow card) 3× (suspension)	Pabellón Anaitasuna, Pamplona; Attendance: 2,000; Referees: Raluy López, Sabroso Ramírez

5 March 2014; 20:30 (UTC+1)	BM Huesca	34–31	FC Barcelona B	Palacio Municipal de Deportes, Huesca; Attendance: 900; Referees: Álvarez Mata, Bustamante López
5 March 2014; 20:30 (UTC+1)	Novelle 9	(16–13)	Figueras, Balaguer 7	Palacio Municipal de Deportes, Huesca; Attendance: 900; Referees: Álvarez Mata, Bustamante López
5 March 2014; 20:30 (UTC+1)	2× (suspension)	Report	1× (suspension)	Palacio Municipal de Deportes, Huesca; Attendance: 900; Referees: Álvarez Mata, Bustamante López

5 March 2014; 20:30 (UTC+1)	Juanfersa Grupo Fegar	13–27	Fraikin Granollers	Palacio de Deportes, Gijón; Attendance: 500; Referees: José Luis & Juan Manuel Vinagre Vázquez
5 March 2014; 20:30 (UTC+1)	Ruesga 4	(9–13)	four players 4	Palacio de Deportes, Gijón; Attendance: 500; Referees: José Luis & Juan Manuel Vinagre Vázquez
5 March 2014; 20:30 (UTC+1)	3× (yellow card) 4× (suspension)	Report	3× (yellow card) 1× (suspension)	Palacio de Deportes, Gijón; Attendance: 500; Referees: José Luis & Juan Manuel Vinagre Vázquez

Teams qualified to Final Four
FC Barcelona	Helvetia Anaitasuna
BM Huesca	Fraikin Granollers

== Final four ==
The Final Four will be held in Pamplona, Navarre at the Pabellón Anaitasuna, with the matches being played on 3 and 4 May. The draw was conducted on 16 April.

Semifinals
(Navarre) Helvetia Anaitasuna	28
(Catalonia) FC Barcelona	36
(Catalonia) Fraikin Granollers	26
(Aragon) BM Huesca	25

Final
(Catalonia) FC Barcelona	42
(Catalonia) Fraikin Granollers	32

=== Semifinals ===
May 3; 18:30 (UTC+2)	Helvetia Anaitasuna	28–36	FC Barcelona	Pabellón Anaitasuna, Pamplona; Attendance: 3,200; Referees: Escudero Santiuste, Jesús & Jorge
May 3; 18:30 (UTC+2)	Nadoveza 7	(10–17)	Lazarov 7	Pabellón Anaitasuna, Pamplona; Attendance: 3,200; Referees: Escudero Santiuste, Jesús & Jorge
May 3; 18:30 (UTC+2)	3× (yellow card) 4× (suspension)	Report	3× (yellow card) 3× (suspension)	Pabellón Anaitasuna, Pamplona; Attendance: 3,200; Referees: Escudero Santiuste, Jesús & Jorge

May 3; 20:30 (UTC+2)	Fraikin Granollers	26–25	BM Huesca	Pabellón Anaitasuna, Pamplona; Attendance: 3,000; Referees: Muro San José, Rodríguez Murcia
May 3; 20:30 (UTC+2)	A Ruiz 7	(12–13)	Pepe Novelle 7	Pabellón Anaitasuna, Pamplona; Attendance: 3,000; Referees: Muro San José, Rodríguez Murcia
May 3; 20:30 (UTC+2)	3× (yellow card) 1× (suspension)	Report	3× (yellow card) 3× (suspension)	Pabellón Anaitasuna, Pamplona; Attendance: 3,000; Referees: Muro San José, Rodríguez Murcia

=== Final ===
May 4; 17:00 (UTC+2)	FC Barcelona	42–32	Fraikin Granollers	Pabellón Anaitasuna, Pamplona; Attendance: 3,200; Referees: Raluy López, Sabroso Ramírez
May 4; 17:00 (UTC+2)	Sarmiento 7	(22–17)	Pérez, Ruiz 5	Pabellón Anaitasuna, Pamplona; Attendance: 3,200; Referees: Raluy López, Sabroso Ramírez
May 4; 17:00 (UTC+2)	3× (yellow card) 2× (suspension)	Report	3× (yellow card) 1× (suspension)	Pabellón Anaitasuna, Pamplona; Attendance: 3,200; Referees: Raluy López, Sabroso Ramírez

2013–14 Copa del Rey de Balonmano winners
(Catalonia)
FC Barcelona
Eighteenth title

== Top goalscorers ==
- Updated after Final. Players in **bold**, still active in the competition.

Player	Team	Goals	Matches	g/m
(North Macedonia) **Kiril Lazarov**	FC Barcelona	30	5	6
(Spain) Víctor Sáez	FC Barcelona B	29	5	5,8
(Spain) Adrià Figueras	FC Barcelona B	28	5	5,6
(Spain) Álvaro Ruiz	Fraikin Granollers	25	5	5
(Spain) Alejandro Marcelo	BM Huesca	24	4	6

== See also ==
- Liga ASOBAL 2013–14
- 2013 Copa ASOBAL
