= 2013 Copa ASOBAL =

XXIV Copa ASOBAL 2013

Tournament details
- Venue(s): Palau Blaugrana (in Barcelona host cities)
- Dates: 21 – 22 December
- Teams: 4

Final positions
- Champions: FC Barcelona (9th title)
- Runner-up: Fraikin Granollers

Tournament statistics
- Matches played: 3
- Goals scored: 183 (61 per match)
- Attendance: 7,600 (2,533 per match)
- Top scorer(s): Víctor Tomás, 14

Awards
- Best player: Víctor Tomás

The 2013 Copa ASOBAL was the 24th edition of the Copa ASOBAL. It took place in the Palau Blaugrana, in Barcelona, Catalonia, on 21 & 22 December 2013. The tournament was hosted by FC Barcelona and Barcelona city council, being the second time Barcelona hosts Copa ASOBAL.

FC Barcelona won its overall ninth title, third in a row and qualified for 2014–15 EHF Champions League.

== Qualified teams ==
Qualified teams are the top four teams on standings at midseason (matchday 15).

#	Team	P	W	D	L	G+	G−	Dif	Pts
1	FC Barcelona	15	15	0	0	561	334	227	30
2	Fraikin Granollers	15	11	0	4	386	354	32	22
3	BM Huesca	15	10	1	4	402	380	22	21
4	Naturhouse La Rioja	15	9	2	4	455	414	41	20

== Venue ==
Barcelona
Palau Blaugrana
Capacity: 7,585
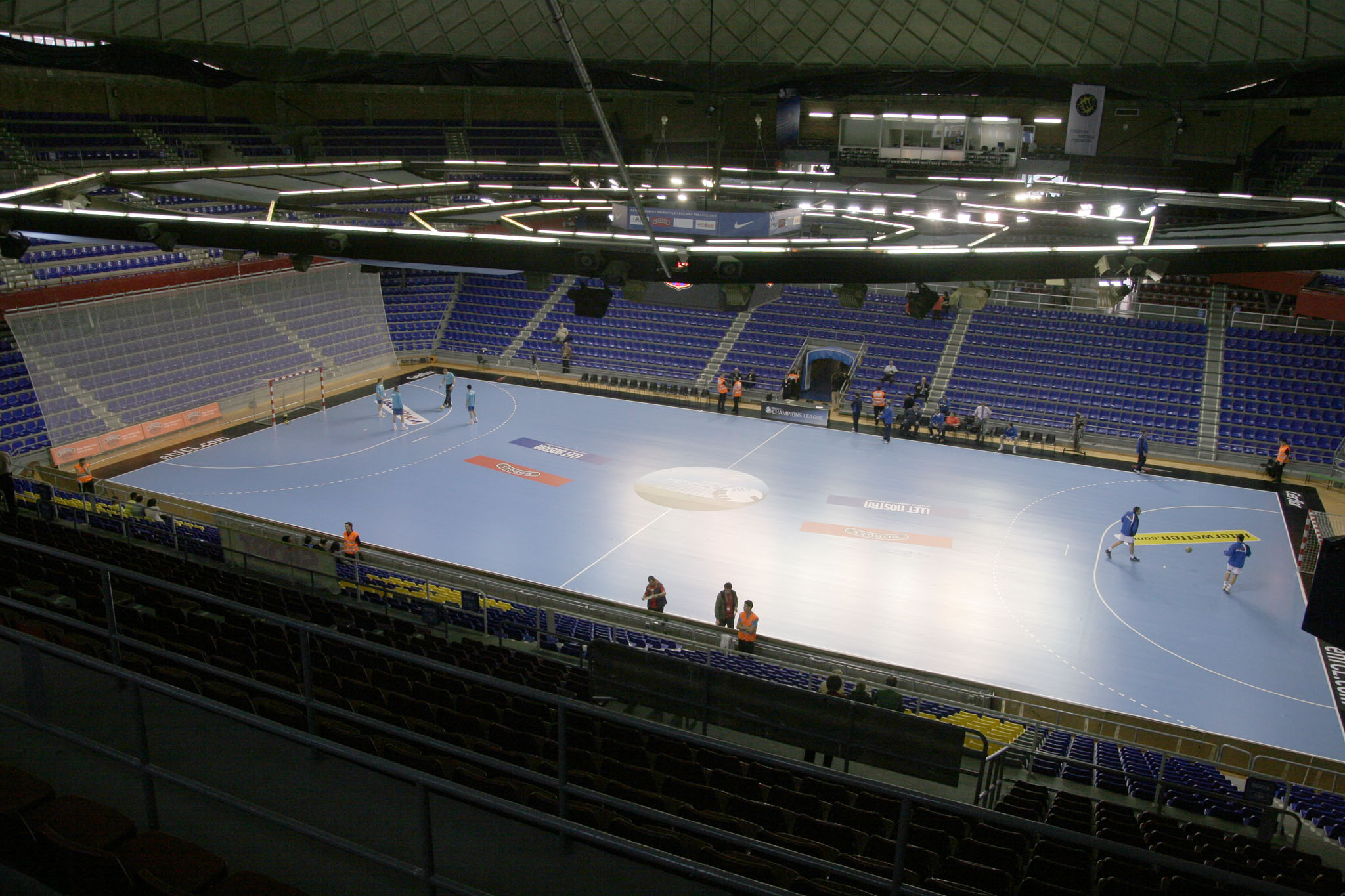

== Matches ==
Semifinals
1	FC Barcelona	39
3	BM Huesca	25
2	Fraikin Granollers	29
4	Naturhouse La Rioja	28

Final
1	FC Barcelona	34
2	Fraikin Granollers	28

=== Semifinals ===
21 December; 11:30 (UTC+1)	Fraikin Granollers	29–28	Naturhouse La Rioja	Palau Blaugrana, Barcelona; Attendance: 2,500; Referees: García Mosquera, Ríos Martín
21 December; 11:30 (UTC+1)	A Ruiz 8	(11–12)	Tioumentsev 8	Palau Blaugrana, Barcelona; Attendance: 2,500; Referees: García Mosquera, Ríos Martín
21 December; 11:30 (UTC+1)	3× (yellow card) 6× (suspension) 1× (red card)	Report	3× (yellow card) 4× (suspension)	Palau Blaugrana, Barcelona; Attendance: 2,500; Referees: García Mosquera, Ríos Martín

21 December; 13:30 (UTC+1)	FC Barcelona	39–25	BM Huesca	Palau Blaugrana, Barcelona; Attendance: 2,100; Referees: Bustamante López, Álvarez Mata
21 December; 13:30 (UTC+1)	Entrerríos 6	(20–12)	Marcelo 6	Palau Blaugrana, Barcelona; Attendance: 2,100; Referees: Bustamante López, Álvarez Mata
21 December; 13:30 (UTC+1)	3× (yellow card) 2× (suspension)	Report	3× (yellow card) 2× (suspension)	Palau Blaugrana, Barcelona; Attendance: 2,100; Referees: Bustamante López, Álvarez Mata

=== Final ===
22 December; 20:00 (UTC+1)	FC Barcelona	34–28	Fraikin Granollers	Palau Blaugrana, Barcelona; Attendance: 4,000; Referees: Bustamante López, Álvarez Mata
22 December; 20:00 (UTC+1)	V Tomás 9	(20–15)	del Arco 5	Palau Blaugrana, Barcelona; Attendance: 4,000; Referees: Bustamante López, Álvarez Mata
22 December; 20:00 (UTC+1)	3× (yellow card) 4× (suspension)	Report	2× (yellow card) 2× (suspension)	Palau Blaugrana, Barcelona; Attendance: 4,000; Referees: Bustamante López, Álvarez Mata

2013 Copa ASOBAL winners
(Catalonia)
FC Barcelona
Ninth title

== TV coverage ==
The tournament was broadcast in Catalonia in Esport3 and nationwide at Spain in Sportmanía. Also worldwide via LAOLA1.tv

== Top goalscorers ==
Player	Team	Goals
(Spain) Víctor Tomás	FC Barcelona	14
(Spain) Álvaro Ruiz	Fraikin Granollers	11
(Russia) Alexandre Tioumentsev	Naturhouse La Rioja	8
(Spain) Raúl Entrerríos	FC Barcelona	8
(North Macedonia) Kiril Lazarov	FC Barcelona	8
(Spain) Juan del Arco	Fraikin Granollers	8
(Belarus) Siarhei Rutenka	FC Barcelona	7
(Spain) Ferran Solé	Fraikin Granollers	7

== See also ==
- Liga ASOBAL 2013–14
- Copa del Rey de Balonmano 2013–14
