= 2015–16 División de Plata de Balonmano =

División de Plata
- Season: 2015–16
- Champions: Atlético Valladolid
- Promoted: Atlético Valladolid
- Relegated: Academia Octavio; La Roca; Cisne BM
- Matches played: 240

The 2015–16 División de Plata de Balonmano is the 22nd season of second-tier handball competition in Spain.

The regular season was to begin in September 2015. After completing 30 matchdays, the top ranked team would be promoted to Liga ASOBAL, and each subsequently ranked team (2nd, 3rd, 4th and 5th) would compete in the promotion playoff for the one open spot in the Liga ASOBAL. The three bottom ranked teams would be relegated to Primera Estatal.

== Competition rules ==
The regular season competition would consist of 16 teams playing each other twice for a total of 30 matchdays. At the end of the regular season, the top ranked team in the standings would be promoted to Liga ASOBAL. Teams in 2nd, 3rd, 4th and 5th place would play each other in the promotion playoff for a single spot in Liga ASOBAL. The bottom three ranked teams would be relegated to Primera División Estatal.

Points during regular season are awarded as follows:

- The winner in each match would be awarded 2 points.
- A draw in any match would have 1 point awarded to each team.

== Teams ==
Location of teams in División de Plata 2015–16

Team	Location	Stadium	Capacity
MMT Seguros Zamora	Zamora	Ángel Nieto	1,200
Juanfersa Comunicalia	Gijón	Palacio de Deportes	5,197
FC Barcelona B Lassa	Barcelona	Palau Blaugrana	7,500
Atlético Valladolid	Valladolid	Huerta del Rey	3,500
Bidasoa Irun	Irun	Polideportivo Artaleku	2,200
Viveros Herol Nava	Nava de la Asunción	Polideportivo Municipal	700
Alcobendas	Alcobendas	Los Sueños	1,000
Academia Octavio	Vigo	As Travesas	4,500
Zumosol ARS Palma del Río	Palma del Río	El Pandero	1,500
Bordils	Bordils	Pavelló Blanc i Verd	500
La Roca	La Roca del Vallès	Pavelló Nou	1,000
Meridiano Antequera	Antequera	Fernando Argüelles	2,575
Amenabar Zarautz	Zarautz	Polideportivo Municipal	3,000
Cisne	Pontevedra	CGTD de Pontevedra	300
Alarcos Ciudad Real	Ciudad Real	Quijote Arena	5,863
R.G.C. Covadonga	Gijón	Braulio García	1,331

^a RGC Covadonga achieved the berth of the reserve team of BM Granollers, which resigned to play in División de Plata.

== Regular season standings ==
Pos	Team	Pld	W	D	L	GF	GA	GD	Pts	Qualification or relegation
1	Atlético Valladolid	30	28	1	1	905	710	+195	57	Promotion to Liga ASOBAL
2	Bidasoa Irun	30	25	1	4	889	709	+180	51	Qualified to promotion playoff
3	Zumosol ARS Palma del Río	30	24	1	5	818	706	+112	49	Qualified to promotion playoff
4	MMT Seguros Zamora	30	19	3	8	782	732	+50	41	Qualified to promotion playoff
5	FC Barcelona Lassa B (Note: FC Barcelona Lassa B is ineligible for promotion nor playoffs.)	30	19	3	8	902	818	+84	41	
6	BM Alarcos Ciudad Real	30	14	4	12	854	851	+3	32	Qualified to promotion playoff
7	Juanfersa Comunicalia	30	14	2	14	805	771	+34	30	
8	Bordils	30	11	4	15	814	839	−25	26	
9	RGC Covadonga	30	10	5	15	765	806	−41	25	
10	Meridiano Antequera	30	9	4	17	751	789	−38	22	
11	Alcobendas	30	9	3	18	747	800	−53	21	
12	Viveros Herol Nava	30	9	3	18	739	816	−77	21	
13	Amenabar Zarautz	30	9	2	19	753	873	−120	20	
14	Cisne BM	30	6	4	20	811	904	−93	16	Relegation to Primera División
15	La Roca	30	6	4	20	800	892	−92	16	Relegation to Primera División
16	Academia Octavio	30	5	2	23	735	854	−119	12	Relegation to Primera División

Source: División de Plata and rfebm.net
Rules for classification: 1) points; 2) head-to-head points; 3) head-to-head goal difference; 4) goal difference; 5) number of goals scored

== Promotion playoffs ==
The promotion playoffs were played at Pabellón Polideportivo Artaleku, home of the top seeded team Bidasoa Irún on 4 and 5 June 2016.

The winner of this playoff promoted to Liga ASOBAL with the regular season champion Atlético Valladolid.

=== Bracket ===
Semifinals
2	Bidasoa Irún	19
6	BM Alarcos Ciudad Real	15
3	Zumosol ARS Palma del Río	17
4	MMT Seguros Zamora	22

Final
2	Bidasoa Irún	25
4	MMT Seguros Zamora	21
Third position game
6	BM Alarcos Ciudad Real	24
3	Zumosol ARS Palma del Río	28
