= Real Grupo de Cultura Covadonga (handball) =

Spanish handball club

Grupo Covadonga
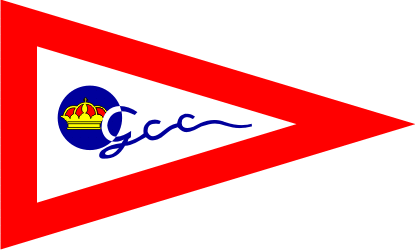
- Full name: Real Grupo de Cultura Covadonga
- Arena: Polideportivo Braulio García, Gijón, Asturias, Spain
- Capacity: 1,331
- President: Enrique Tamargo
- Head coach: Chechu Villaldea
- League: División de Plata
- 2014–15: 2nd (1ª Estatal – Group B)
Home	Away

Real Grupo de Cultura Covadonga is a handball team in Gijón, Asturias. Spain, that plays in División de Plata, the second tier in the Spanish handball.

== History ==
Grupo Covadonga played the top league from the 1976–77 to the 1979–80, after winning the promotion playoff to BM Gavà on May 10, 1976. Years later, in 2001, it achieved a vacant berth in the División de Plata, second tier, and was very close to promote to Liga ASOBAL. After several tries, Grupo Covadonga decreased its level and was relegated to Primera Nacional.

In 2015, despite failing for the second time in a row to promote, Grupo Covadonga returned to División de Plata after taking the spot of the reserve team of BM Granollers. Three years later, the club resigned and sold its place to BM Villa de Aranda.

== Season by season ==
Season	Tier	Division	Pos.	Notes	Copa del Rey
1976–77	1	Div. Honor	7th		Round of 16
1977–78	1	Div. Honor	6th		Quarterfinalist
1978–79	1	Div. Honor	8th		Quarterfinalist
1979–80	1	Div. Honor	12th	Relegated	
1980–81	2	1ª Nacional	3rd		
1981–82	2	1ª Nacional	5th		
1982–83	2	1ª Nacional			
1983–84	2	1ª Nacional	4th		
1984–85	2	1ª Nacional	11th		
1991–92	3	2ª Estatal	2nd		
1992–93	3	2ª Estatal	1st		
1993–94	3	2ª Estatal	1st		
1994–95	4	2ª Estatal	2nd		
1995–96	4	2ª Estatal	3rd		
1996–97	4	2ª Estatal	1st	Promoted	
1997–98	3	1ª Estatal	9th		
1998–99	3	1ª Estatal	10th		
1999–00	3	1ª Estatal	11th		
2000–01	3	1ª Estatal	12th		

Season	Tier	Division	Pos.	Notes	Copa del Rey
2001–02	2	Honor B	6th		
2002–03	2	Honor B	4th		
2003–04	2	Honor B	3rd		
2004–05	2	Honor B	5th		
2005–06	2	Honor B	10th		
2006–07	2	Honor B	14th		
2007–08	2	Honor B	15th	Relegated	
2008–09	3	1ª Estatal	13th		
2009–10	3	1ª Estatal	14th	Relegated	
2010–11	4	2ª Estatal	1st		
2011–12	4	2ª Estatal	1st	Promoted	
2012–13	3	1ª Estatal	4th		
2013–14	3	1ª Estatal	1st		
2014–15	3	1ª Estatal	2nd		
2015–16	2	Plata	9th		First round
2016–17	2	Plata	7th		First round
2017–18	2	Plata	9th		First round
2018–19	3	1ª Nacional	6th		

== Notable players ==
- (Spain) Alberto Entrerríos
- (Spain) Raúl Entrerríos
- (Spain) Juan de la Puente
- (Spain) Carlos Ruesga
