= 2012–13 División de Plata de Balonmano =

División de Plata
- Season: 2012–13
- Champions: FC Barcelona B
- Relegated: None
- Matches: 132
- Goals: 7,097 (53.77 per match)
- Top goalscorer: Adrián Figueras, 160 goals
- Biggest home win: BM Alcobendas 36–20 CB Pozoblanco
- Biggest away win: Amenabar Zarautz 17–32 Juanfersa Gijón
- Highest scoring: FC Barcelona B 44–37 Torrelavega

The 2012–13 season of the División de Plata de Balonmano is the 19th season of second-tier handball in Spain.

Regular season started in October 2012 and finished in late April. After completing 22 matchdays, top team is promoted to Liga ASOBAL, and teams qualified 2nd, 3rd, 4th and 5th play the promotion playoff.

As the champion team was FC Barcelona B, a reserve team, therefore unable to promote, Juanfersa Gijón was automatically promoted.

Ángel Ximénez will play in Liga ASOBAL 2013–14 by winning the promotion playoffs after defeating host team Bidasoa Irún in the final 26–28.

== Promotion and relegation ==
Once finished 2012–13 regular season.

Teams promoted to Liga ASOBAL 2013–14

- Juanfersa Gijón – 2nd at standings
- Ángel Ximénez – via playoffs
- Bidasoa Irun – due to vacant seats

Teams relegated to 2013–14 Primera Nacional

- None

== Teams ==
Location of teams in División de Plata 2012–13
Location of Basque teams in División de Plata 2012–13

Team	Location	Stadium	Capacity
Adelma Sinfín	Santander	La Albericia	4,000
Alcobendas	Alcobendas	Los Sueños	1,000
Amenabar Zarautz	Zarautz	Polideportivo Municipal	3,000
Ángel Ximénez	Puente Genil	Alcalde Miguel Salas	600
Bidasoa Irún	Irún	Artaleku	2,686
Calmec Barakaldo	Barakaldo	Lasesarre	2,576
Ereintza Aguaplast	Errenteria	Galtzaraborda	1,000
FC Barcelona B	Barcelona	Palau Blaugrana	7,500
Juanfersa Gijón	Gijón	La Arena	2,500
Pozoblanco	Pozoblanco	Juan Sepúlveda	1,500
Teucro	Pontevedra	Pavillón Municipal	4,000
Torrelavega	Torrelavega	Vicente Trueba	5,375

== Regular season standings ==
Pos	Team	Pld	W	D	L	GF	GA	GD	Pts	Promotion or qualification
1	FC Barcelona B (Note: FC Barcelona B can't play promotion playoff due its reserve team status.)	22	16	3	3	687	597	+90	35	
2	Juanfersa Gijón	22	16	2	4	605	526	+79	34	Promoted
3	Bidasoa Irún	22	14	1	7	620	593	+27	29	Promotion playoffs
4	Ángel Ximénez	22	13	3	6	566	523	+43	29	Promotion playoffs
5	Alcobendas	22	11	4	7	610	584	+26	26	Promotion playoffs
6	Teucro	22	12	1	9	617	577	+40	25	Promotion playoffs
7	Torrelavega	22	10	3	9	626	607	+19	23	
8	Adelma Sinfín	22	9	4	9	580	589	−9	22	
9	Pozoblanco	22	6	1	15	528	613	−85	13	
10	Calmec Barakaldo	22	5	1	16	566	628	−62	11	
11	Amenabar Zarautz	22	4	2	16	559	632	−73	10	
12	Ereintza Aguaplast	22	3	1	18	533	628	−95	7	

== Promotion playoffs ==
Winner of Final will be promoted to Liga ASOBAL for 2013–14 season.

- Host team: Bidasoa Irún
- City: Irun and Hondarribia, Gipuzkoa
- Venue: Polideportivo Hondartza and Polideportivo Artaleku
- Date: 11–12 May 2013

=== Bracket ===
Semi-finals
11 May - Hondartza
Bidasoa Irún	24
Teucro	20
11 May - Hondartza
Ángel Ximénez	29
Alcobendas	27

Final
12 May - Artaleku
Bidasoa Irún	26
Ángel Ximénez	28
Third place
12 May - Artaleku
Teucro	34
Alcobendas	33

Promoted to Liga ASOBAL

=== Semifinals ===
11 May; 17:00 (UTC+2)	Bidasoa Irún	24–20	Teucro	Polideportivo Hondartza, Hondarribia; Attendance: 800; Referees: Miranda Bedate, San Pedro Colorado
11 May; 17:00 (UTC+2)	Crowley 8	(10–7)	Rial 7	Polideportivo Hondartza, Hondarribia; Attendance: 800; Referees: Miranda Bedate, San Pedro Colorado
11 May; 17:00 (UTC+2)	3× (suspension)	Report	5× (suspension)	Polideportivo Hondartza, Hondarribia; Attendance: 800; Referees: Miranda Bedate, San Pedro Colorado

11 May; 19:30 (UTC+2)	Ángel Ximénez	29–27	Alcobendas	Polideportivo Hondartza, Hondarribia; Attendance: 200; Referees: Bohigas Estela, Castañer Girbes
11 May; 19:30 (UTC+2)	de la Sierra 7	(14–12)	Beret 7	Polideportivo Hondartza, Hondarribia; Attendance: 200; Referees: Bohigas Estela, Castañer Girbes
11 May; 19:30 (UTC+2)	4× (suspension)	Report		Polideportivo Hondartza, Hondarribia; Attendance: 200; Referees: Bohigas Estela, Castañer Girbes

=== Third place ===
12 May; 10:00 (UTC+2)	Teucro	34–33	Alcobendas	Polideportivo Artaleku, Irun; Attendance: 250; Referees: Bohigas Estela, Castañer Girbes
12 May; 10:00 (UTC+2)	Rial 9	(15–14)	Márquez 8	Polideportivo Artaleku, Irun; Attendance: 250; Referees: Bohigas Estela, Castañer Girbes
12 May; 10:00 (UTC+2)	9× (suspension)	Report	10× (suspension)	Polideportivo Artaleku, Irun; Attendance: 250; Referees: Bohigas Estela, Castañer Girbes

=== Final ===
12 May; 12:30 (UTC+2)	Bidasoa Irún	26–28	Ángel Ximénez	Polideportivo Artaleku, Irun; Attendance: 1,800; Referees: Amigo Plaza, Espadas García
12 May; 12:30 (UTC+2)	Renaud-David 14	(12–15)	Pepe Pozo 5	Polideportivo Artaleku, Irun; Attendance: 1,800; Referees: Amigo Plaza, Espadas García
12 May; 12:30 (UTC+2)	4× (suspension)	Report	4× (suspension)	Polideportivo Artaleku, Irun; Attendance: 1,800; Referees: Amigo Plaza, Espadas García

== Top goal scorers ==
Player	Goals	Team
(Spain) Adrià Figueras	160	FC Barcelona B
(Spain) Jon Ortuondo	142	Calmec Barakaldo
(France) Léo Renaud-David	119	Bidasoa Irún
(Spain) Ángel Fernández	118	Torrelavega
(Spain) "Toño" Fernández	118	Teucro
(Spain) Marc García	112	FC Barcelona B
(Spain) Erik Balenciaga	111	Amenabar Zarautz
(Spain) Alberto Requena	105	Pozoblanco
(Spain) José Manuel Herrero	103	Adelma Sinfín
(Spain) César Beret	102	Alcobendas
