= Handball in Spain =

The Spanish handball league is divided into divisions. The top teams play in the Liga ASOBAL. In each division, a team plays all other teams twice, once at home and once away.

The Spanish league teams compete in Europe under the European Handball Federation, most notably in the EHF Champions League. The teams also compete in a domestic cup competition each year, called the Copa del Rey. The winners of the Liga ASOBAL play the winners of the Copa del Rey in the Supercopa ASOBAL (Super Cup).

== Current hierarchical divisional breakdowns ==
- División de Honor (16 teams)
- División de Plata (16 teams)
- List of handball clubs in Spain

For a list of teams, see List of handball clubs in Spain

The Spain men's national handball team represents the whole country, who has won two World Championships.

== Current female hierarchical divisional breakdowns ==
- División de Honor Femenina (14 teams)

For a list of teams, see List of handball clubs in Spain

The Spain national women's handball team represents the whole country.

== Others Competitions ==
- Copa del Rey de Balonmano
- Copa de la Reina de Balonmano
- Supercopa ASOBAL
- Copa ASOBAL
