= List of handball clubs in Spain =

List of handball clubs in Spain sorted by division:

== Men's ==
=== Liga ASOBAL teams ===
- 2015–16 season

=== División de Plata teams ===
- 2015–16 season

== Women's ==
=== División de Honor Femenina teams ===
- 2015–16 teams
