= AB Gijón Jovellanos =

Spanish handball team

Gijón Jovellanos
- Full name: Agrupación Balonmano Gijón Jovellanos
- Founded: 2009
- Arena: Palacio de Deportes, Gijón, Asturias, Spain
- Capacity: 5,197
- President: Juan Gabriel de Álvaro
- Head coach: Sergio Cotelo
- League: División de Plata
- 2014–15: Liga ASOBAL, 16th – relegated
Home	Away

Agrupación Balonmano Gijón Jovellanos is a handball team based in Gijón, Asturias. Gijón Jovellanos plays in Liga ASOBAL.

== History ==
Gijón Jovellanos was founded in 2009 with the aim to be the main handball club in the city grouping the players of the top farm teams in the city.

In its two first seasons competed in Primera Estatal, the third tier, promoting to División de Plata in 2011.

In the 2011–12 season, Gijón Jovellanos qualified for the promotion playoffs to Liga ASOBAL, played in Cangas do Morrazo, but failed in the semifinals against CB Cangas. This promotion was achieved in the next season on 13 April 2013, after beating CB Puente Genil in Gijón by 25–22. Finally, Gijón Jovellanos qualified in second position behind FC Barcelona B.

For playing in Liga ASOBAL, the club moved from Pabellón de La Arena to the Palacio de Deportes. In the first season in the Spanish top league, the Gijón Jovellanos finished in the 12th position and reached the quarterfinals of the 2013–14 Copa del Rey.

On April 1, 2015, despite being in the bottom of the 2014–15 Liga ASOBAL table, Gijón Jovellanos qualified for the 2014–15 Copa del Rey Final Four.

Two years later, in a disastrous season, Gijón Jovellanos was relegated to the third tier.

== Arenas ==
- Pabellón del Natahoyo 2009–2010
- Pabellón de La Arena 2010–2013
- Palacio de Deportes 2013–present

== Sponsorship naming ==
- Medicentro Gijón 2009–2011
- Juanfersa Gijón 2012–2013
- Juanfersa Grupo Fegar 2013–2014
- Juanfersa Gijón 2014–2015
- Juanfersa Comunicalia 2015–2016
- Procoaf Gijón 2017–2019
- DKV Gijón 2019–present

== Head coaches ==
- Alberto Suárez 2009–2015
- Sergio Cotelo 2015–

== Retired numbers ==
- 11 David Pellitero

== Season by season ==
Season	Tier	Division	Pos.	Notes	Copa del Rey
2009–10	3	1ª Estatal	5th		
2010–11	3	1ª Estatal	1st	Promoted	
2011–12	2	Plata	6th		
2012–13	2	Plata	2nd	Promoted	
2013–14	1	ASOBAL	12th		Quarterfinals
2014–15	1	ASOBAL	16th	Relegated	Semifinals
2015–16	2	Plata	7th		Round of 16
2016–17	2	Plata	15th	Relegated	First round
2017–18	3	1ª Estatal	6th		
2018–19	3	1ª Nacional	9th		

- 2 seasons in Liga ASOBAL
