= Alejandro Costoya =

Spanish handball player (born 1993)

Personal information
- Full name: Alejandro Costoya Rodríguez
- Nationality: Spanish
- Born: 6 May 1993 (age 33) Avilés, Spain
- Height: 1.93 m (6 ft 4 in)

Sport
- Sport: Handball
- Position: Left back
- Current club: Chambéry SMBH
- Number: 37
National team
Years	Team	Apps	(Gls)
2017-	Spain	18	(21)
Medal record
Mediterranean Games
Bronze medal – third place	2018 Tarragona	Team
- Updated on 24 january 2025

Alejandro Costoya Rodríguez (born 6 May 1993) is a Spanish handball player who plays for Chambéry SMBH and the Spanish team.

He participated at the 2017 World Men's Handball Championship.
