= Pabellón Polideportivo Artaleku =

Arena in Irun, Spain

Coordinates: 43°20′19″N 1°47′36″W

Pabellón Polideportivo Artaleku is an arena in Irun, Spain. It is primarily used for team handball and is the home arena of CD Bidasoa. The arena holds 2,200 people.
