= Nava de la Asunción =

- Municipality
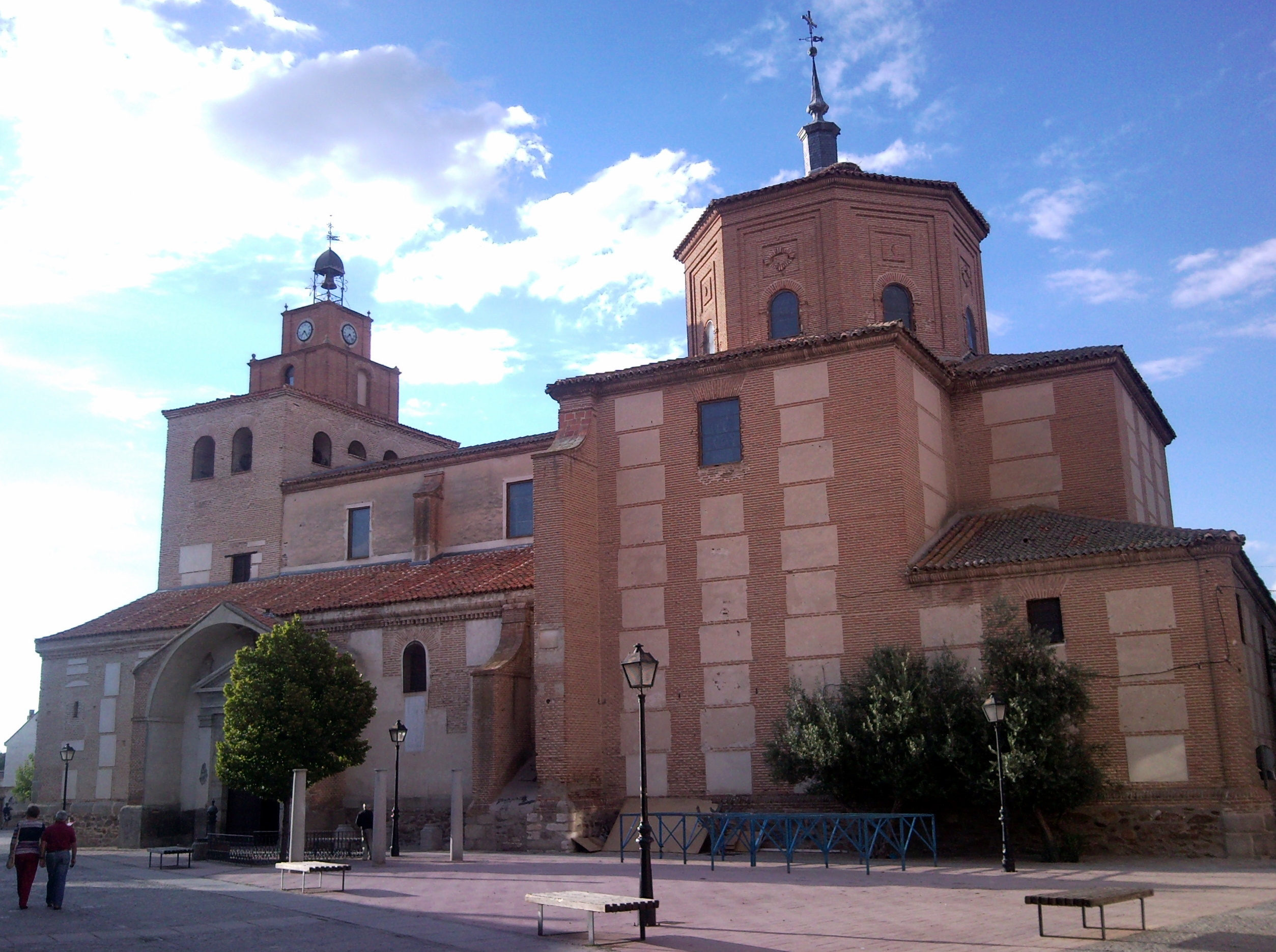
- Church of Nuestra Señora de la Asunción of Nava de la Asunción, Segovia, Spain

- Flag Coat of arms

- Location in Spain. Nava de la Asunción (Spain)
- Coordinates: 41°09′20″N 4°29′13″W
- Country: Spain
- Autonomous community: Castile and León
- Province: Segovia
- Municipality: Nava de la Asunción

Area
  - Total: 82 km^{2} (32 sq mi)

Population (2025-01-01)
  - Total: 2,806
  - Density: 34/km^{2} (89/sq mi)
- Time zone: UTC+1 (CET)
  - Summer (DST): UTC+2 (CEST)
- Website: Official website

Nava de la Asunción is a municipality located in the province of Segovia, Castile and León, Spain. According to the 2004 census (INE), the municipality has a population of 2,645 inhabitants. The municipality holds many festivals.

== Villages ==
- Nava de la Asunción
- Moraleja de Coca

== Notable natives and residents ==
- Jaime Gil de Biedma, poet
