= Palacio de Deportes de Gijón =

Indoor sporting arena located in Spain

Palacio de Deportes
- La Guía
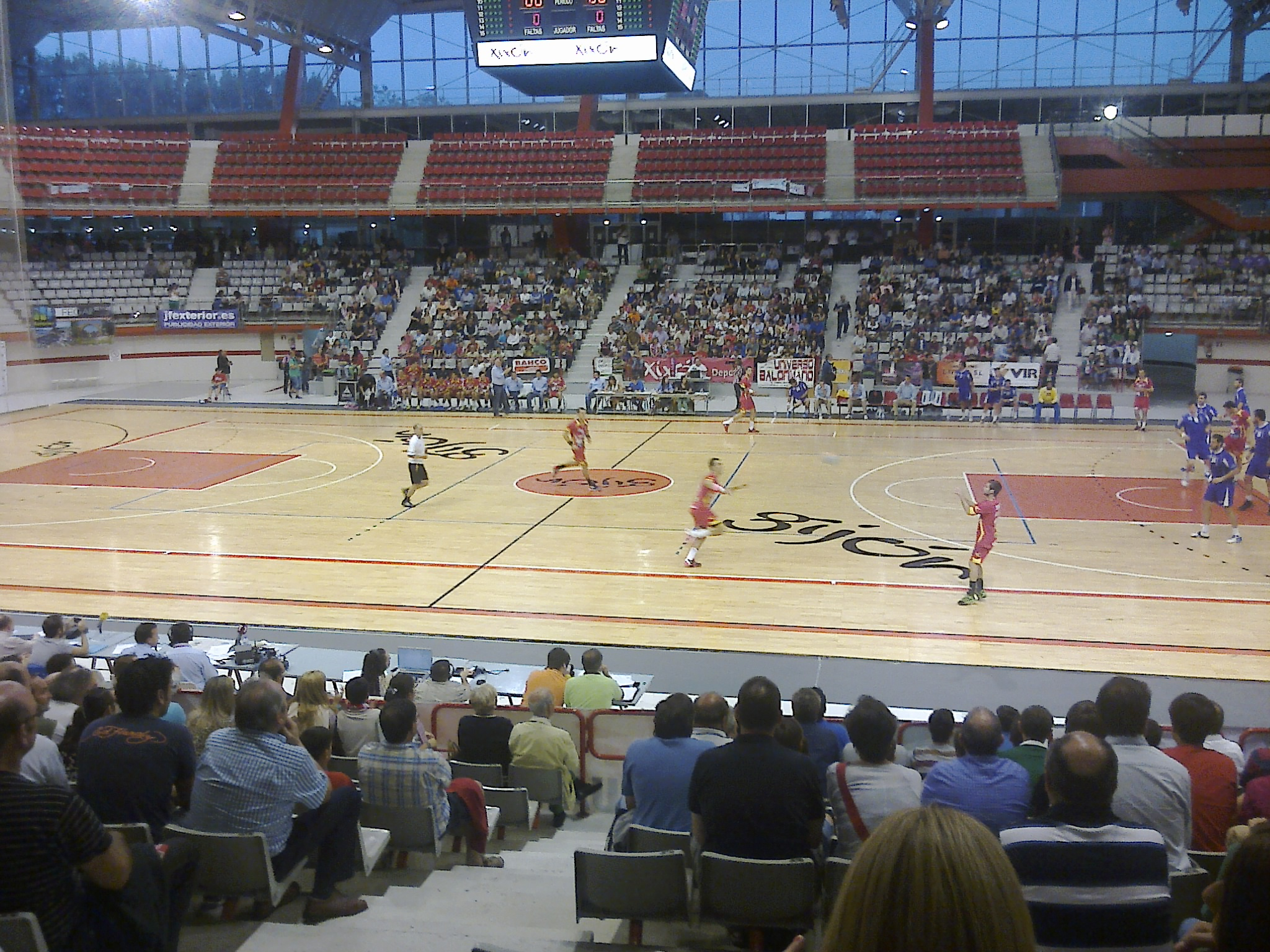
- During a handball game
- Interactive map of Palacio de Deportes
- Full name: Palacio de Deportes de Gijón
- Location: Gijón, Asturias
- Coordinates: 43°32′9″N 5°38′3″W
- Owner: Gijón City Hall
- Capacity: 5,197
- Surface: Parquet Floor
- Record attendance: 8,500

Construction
- Opened: 1992
- Architect: Salvador Pérez Arroyo

Tenants
- Gijón Baloncesto (1992–2009); AB Gijón Jovellanos (2013–present); Gijón Basket (2015–present); Círculo Gijón (2018–present); ATP Gijón Open (2022–present)

Palacio de Deportes de Gijón, officially Palacio de Deportes Presidente Adolfo Suárez, is a multi-purpose sports arena in Gijón, Asturias, Spain. Located in the neighbourhood of La Guía, thus also called, has 5,197 seats and a maximum capacity of 7,000 people. It is owned by the Gijón City Hall.

The arena has also a second court with a capacity of 500 spectators and different halls for practicing several sports like martial arts, weightlifting, snooker, squash, fencing or boxing. It has ten locker rooms and four more for referees.

== History ==
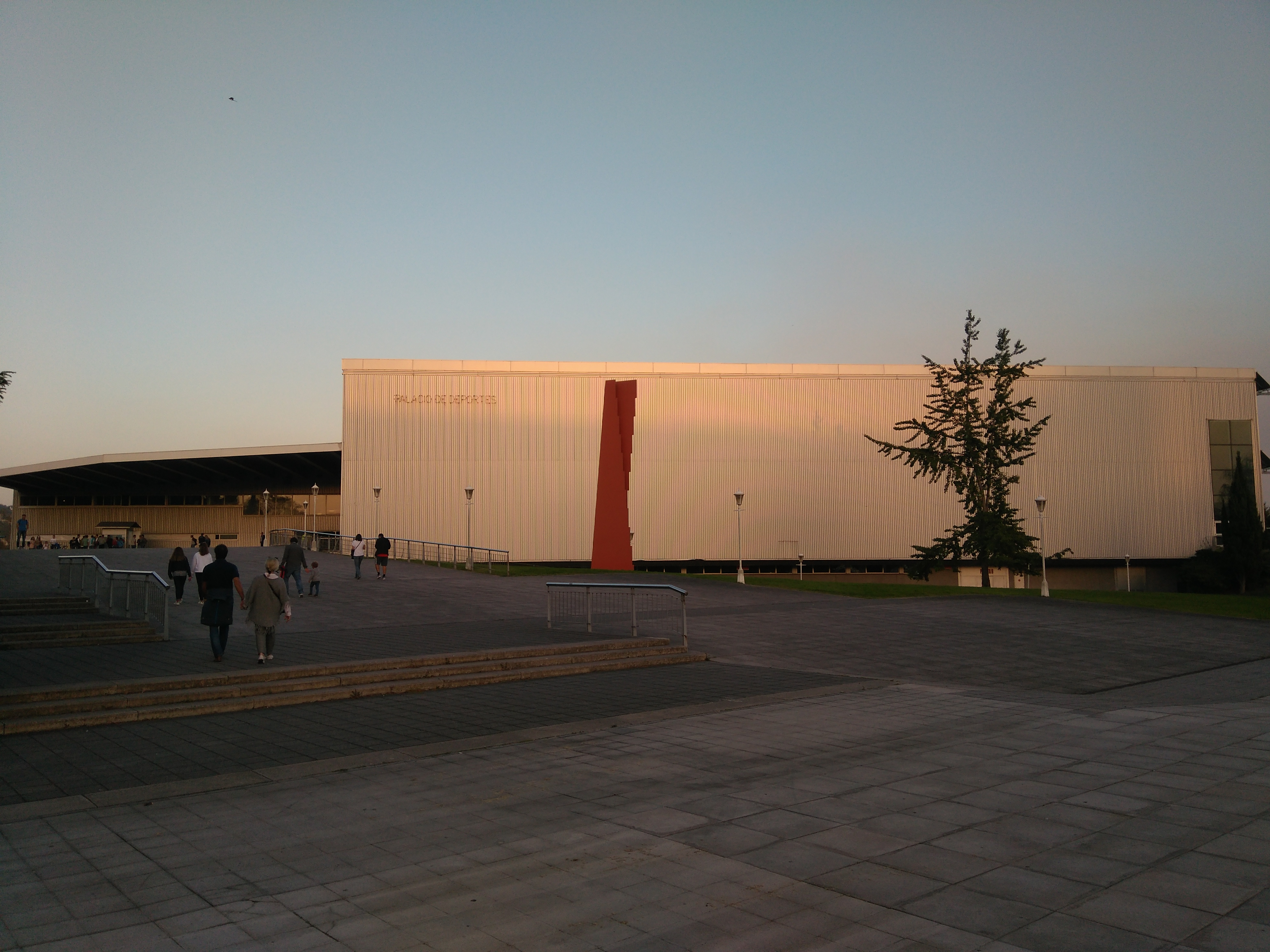
Main façade.

The Palacio de Deportes was inaugurated in 1992 with a concert of Luciano Pavarotti. It has been the home of Gijón Baloncesto until 2009, and it hosted all the home games in its four seasons in the Liga ACB. Nowadays, it is used by Gijón Basket and Círculo Gijón basketball teams. Also by the handball league team AB Gijón Jovellanos.

It also hosted the Final Four of the Copa del Rey de Balonmano 2014–15 on 6 and 7 June 2015 and the 2010 and 2017 editions of the Women's Roller Hockey European Cup.

On 12 April 2014, the City Hall of Gijón accorded to rename the arena as Palacio de Deportes Presidente Adolfo Suárez, in a hommage to the former Spanish Prime Minister. On 2 May 2016, the Town Hall renamed the central court in honour of former basketball player and coach Ed Johnson, who spent 27 years in the city.
