= Ferran Solé =

Spanish handball player (born 1992)

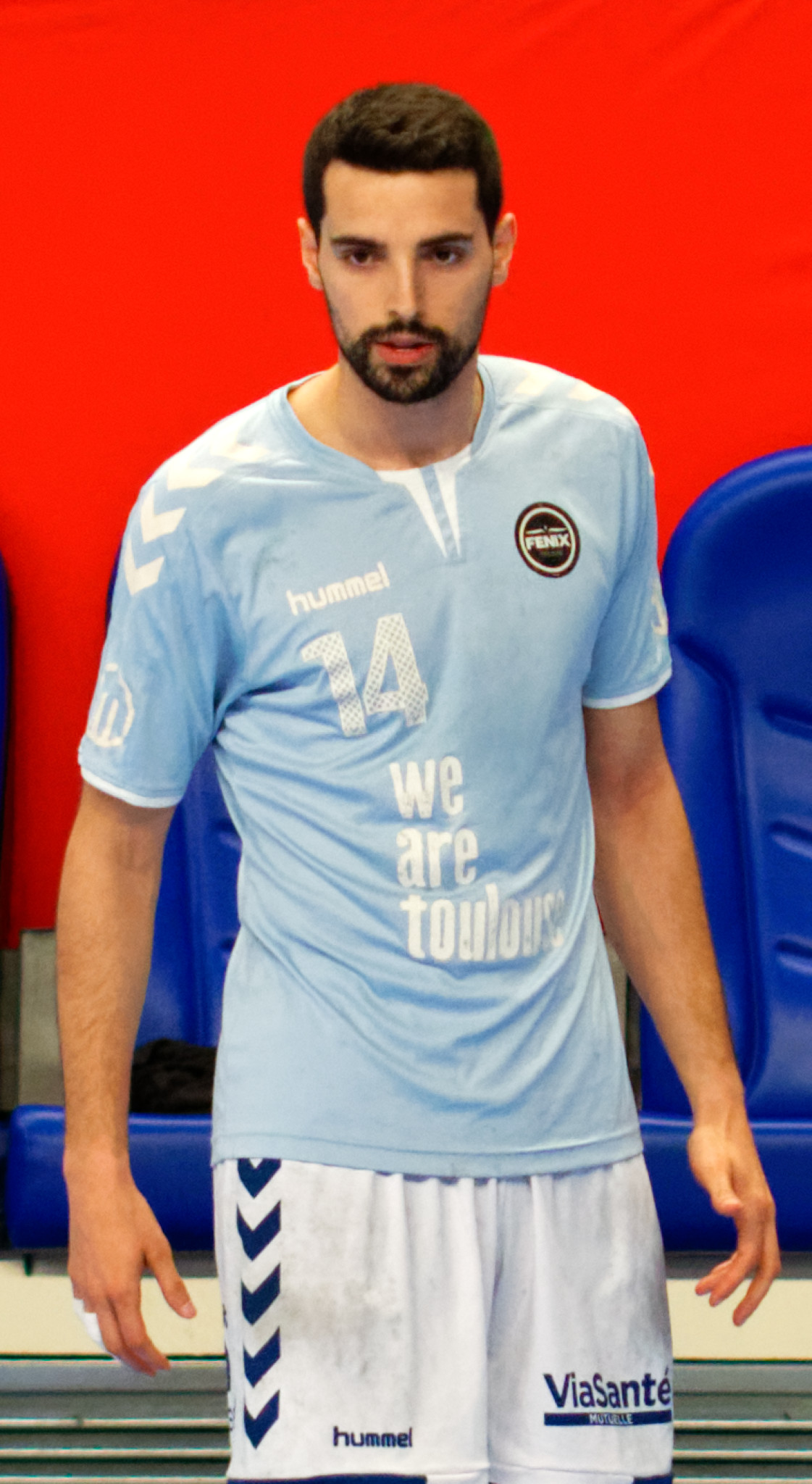
- Solé in 2017

Personal information
- Full name: Ferran Solé Sala
- Nationality: Spanish
- Born: 25 August 1992 (age 34) Sant Quirze, Spain
- Height: 1.92 m (6 ft 4 in)

Sport
- Sport: Handball
- Position: Right wing
- Current club: Paris Saint-Germain
- Number: 14

Senior clubs
- Years: Team
- 2011–2016: BM Granollers
- 2016–2020: Fenix Toulouse
- 2020–: Paris Saint-Germain
National team
Years	Team	Apps	(Gls)
2016–	Spain	113	(429)
Medal record
Olympic Games
Bronze medal – third place	2020 Tokyo	Team
World Championship
Bronze medal – third place	2021 Egypt
Bronze medal – third place	2023 Poland/Sweden
European Championship
Gold medal – first place	2018 Croatia
Gold medal – first place	2020 Sweden/Austria/Norway
Silver medal – second place	2022 Hungary/Slovakia
- Updated on 13 January 2025

Ferran Solé Sala (born 25 August 1992) is a Spanish professional handball player for Paris Saint-Germain and the Spanish national team.

== Career ==
Solé started his career at the Liga ASOBAL club BM Granollers

In 2016 he joined french side Fenix Toulouse Handball, where he played for four years before joining league rivals Paris Saint-Germain.

While playing for Toulouse he debuted for the national team on the 2nd of November 2016.

He participated at the 2018 European Men's Handball Championship.

With PSG he won the French championship in 2021, 2022, 2023, 2024, 2025, and 2026 and the French cup in 2022.

== Individual awards ==
- All-Star Right wing of the World Championship: 2021
