= Víctor Tomás =

Spanish handball player (born 1985)

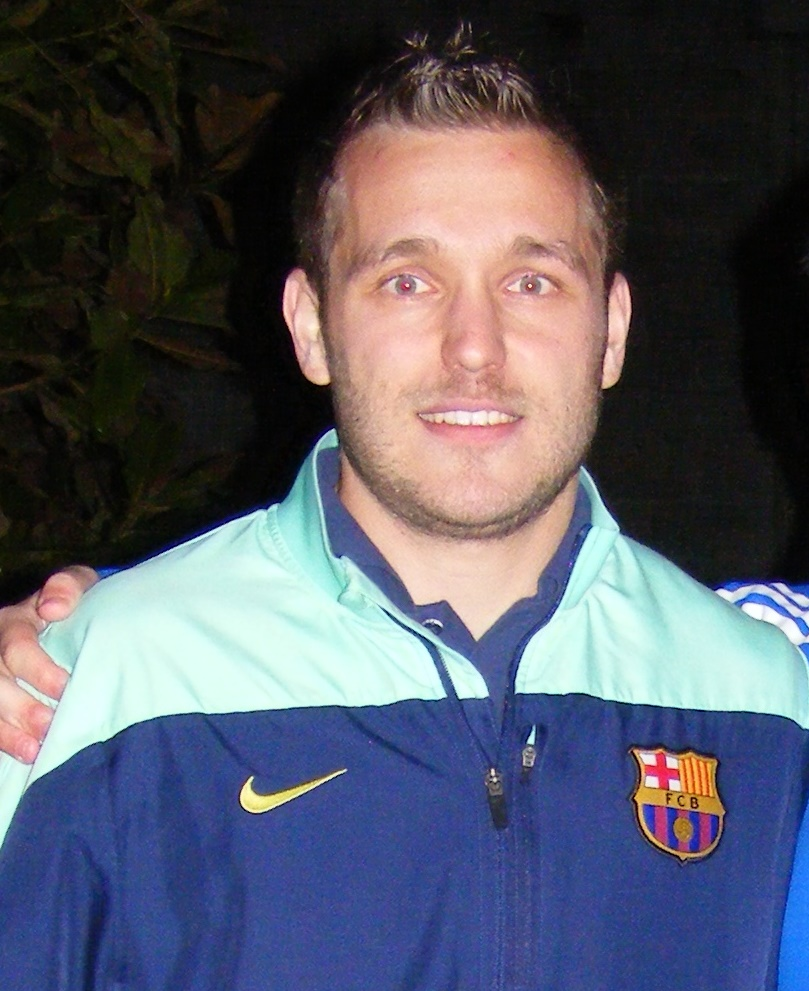

Personal information
- Full name: Víctor Tomás González
- Nationality: Spanish
- Born: 15 February 1985 (age 41) Barcelona, Spain
- Height: 1.78 m (5 ft 10 in)

Sport
- Sport: Handball
- Position: Right wing

Youth career
- Years: Team
- 1998–2004: FC Barcelona

Senior clubs
- Years: Team
- 2004–2020: FC Barcelona
National team
| Years | Team | Apps | (Gls) |
| 2004–2017 | Spain | 176 | (559) |
Medal record
Olympic Games
| Bronze medal – third place | 2008 Beijing | Team |
World Championships
| Gold medal – first place | 2013 Spain |
European Championships
| Silver medal – second place | 2016 Poland |
| Bronze medal – third place | 2014 Denmark |

Víctor Tomás González (born 15 February 1985) is a Spanish retired handball player. He was included in the European Handball Federation Hall of Fame in 2023.

He played for FC Barcelona his whole career and was the captain of the team. Over the course of his 16-year senior career he won a total of 69 titles, including Spanish champion 12 times, and won the EHF Champions League 3 times. He had to retire at the end of the season of 2019/20 due to a heart condition. His shirt number 8 is hanging at FC Barcelona's home arena Palau Blaugrana.

== Titles ==
- World Championship 2013
- EHF Champions League: 2005, 2011, 2015
- EHF Cup: 2003
- European Supercup: 2004
- Liga ASOBAL: 2003, 2006, 2011, 2012, 2013, 2014, 2015, 2016, 2017, 2018, 2019, 2020
- Copa del Rey: 2004, 2007, 2009, 2010, 2014, 2015, 2016, 2017, 2018, 2019, 2020
- Copa ASOBAL: 2010, 2012, 2013, 2014, 2015, 2016, 2017, 2018, 2019, 2020
- Spanish Supercup: 2004, 2007, 2009, 2010, 2013, 2014, 2015, 2016, 2017, 2018, 2019, 2020
- IHF Super Globe: 2014, 2015, 2018, 2019, 2020
- Pyrenean handball league: 2004, 2006, 2007, 2008, 2010, 2011, 2012
- Supercopa de Catalunya: 2013, 2015, 2016, 2017, 2018, 2019, 2020
