= Bordils =

- Municipality
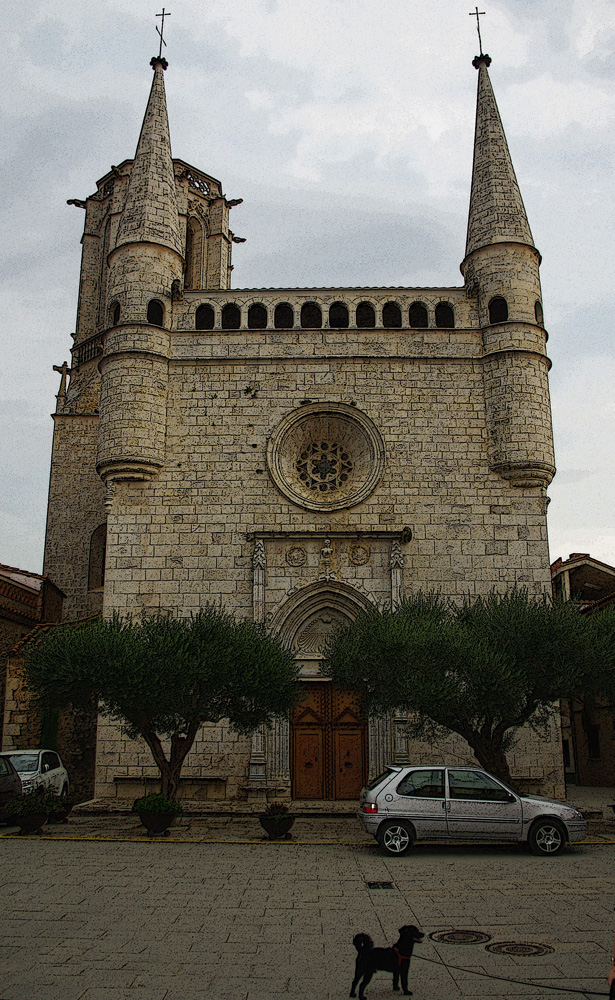
- St. Stephen's parish church, Bordils

- Coat of arms

- Location in Catalonia Bordils (Spain)
- Coordinates: 42°3′N 2°55′E
- Country: Spain
- Community: Catalonia
- Province: Girona
- Comarca: Gironès

Government
  - Mayor: Albert Serrats Llach (2015)

Area
  - Total: 7.3 km^{2} (2.8 sq mi)

Population (2025-01-01)
  - Total: 1,841
  - Density: 250/km^{2} (650/sq mi)
- Website: www.bordils.cat

Bordils (Catalan pronunciation: [buɾˈðils]) is a village in the province of Girona in Catalonia, an autonomous community of Spain. The municipality covers an area of 7.29 square kilometres (2.81 sq mi) and the population in 2014 was 1,690.
