= List of handball clubs in Austria =

This is a list of association handball clubs located in Austria.

== Men Category ==
- Alpla HC Hard
- SG Handball West Wien
- Bregenz Handball
- Handballclub Fivers Margareten
- UHK Krems
- HSG Raiffeisen Bärnbach/Köflac
- HC Linz AG
- Union Basketball Club Sankt Pölten
- ULZ Schwaz
- Union Leoben
- HIT Innsbruck
- UHC Gänserndorf
- UHC Tulln
- SG Handball West Wien
- HC Linz AG
- BT Füchse
- ATV Trofaiach
- Autohaus
- Pichler
- HC ece
- bulls
- UHC Erste Bank Hollabrunn
- HSG Graz
- HC Kärnten
- Team 94
- SC Ferlach
- HC JCL BW Feldkirch
- Jags Vöslau
- WAT Fünfhaus
- UHC Salzburg

== Women Category ==
- Hypo Niederösterreich
- MGA Handball
- SC Wiener Neustadt
- Dornbirn/Schoren
- Hypo NÖ 2
- Feldkirch
- Union Korneuburg
- Atzgersdorf
- Stockerau
- Admira Landhaus
- Fünfhaus
- SG Graz
- Druck Tulln
- UHC Eggenburg
- Kärnten.
- BT Füchse

== Former teams ==
- ATV Trofaiach
- HC Bruch
