= Manaskov =

Manaskov (Macedonian: Манасков) is a surname. Notable people with the surname include:

- Dejan Manaskov (born 1992), Macedonian handball player
- Martin Manaskov (born 1994), Macedonian handball player
- Pepi Manaskov (born 1964), Macedonian handball player and coach
