= Handball Tirol =

Austrian handball club

- Full name: Sparkasse Schwaz Handball Tirol
- Short name: HT
- Founded: 2013; 13 years ago
- Arena: Osthalle Schwaz
- Capacity: 1,000
- President: Klaus Hauser
- Head coach: Christoph Jauernik
- League: HLA Meisterliga
- Club colours
Home	Away

Handball Tirol is a handball club from Schwaz, Austria. They currently compete in the HLA Meisterliga.

The current name of the club is Sparkasse Schwaz Handball Tirol due to sponsorship reasons.

Location of Handball Tirol

== History ==
In May 2013, ULZ Schwaz and HIT Innsbruck merged to form Handball Tirol. In the 2013/14 season, the first team, led by Erwin Gierlinger, finished 7th in the HLA Meisterliga. They became silver medalists in the ÖHB Cup in 2021/22 and 2023/24. In 2024/25, the team won the ÖHB Cup, securing its first title since its founding. The team also won the HLA Supercup in August 2025.

== Crest, colours, supporters ==
=== Club crest ===
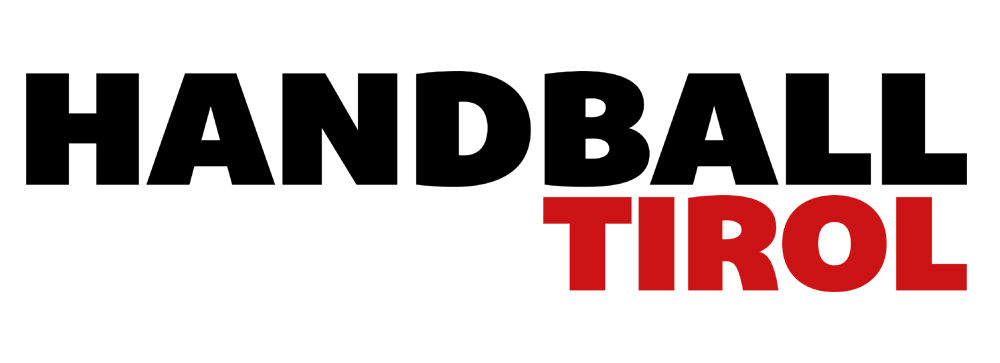
Old Logo
(-2020)

=== Kits ===
HOME

2019–20

== Management ==
Position	Name
President	(Austria) Klaus Hauser
Sport Director	(Austria) Thomas Lintner

== Team ==
=== Current squad ===
Squad for the 2025–26 season

Handball Tirol

Goalkeepers

- 12 (Austria) Tobias Alber
- 52 (Austria) Boris Tanic

Left Wingers

- 47 (Austria) Benjamin Erhard
- 77 (Austria) Lukas Prader

Right Wingers

- 17 (Croatia) Filip Perić
- 21 (Germany) Philipp Jochimsen

Line Players

- 6 (Austria) Emanuel Petrusic
- 97 (Austria) Samuel Kofler

Left Backs

- 5 (Netherlands) Jelte Hiemstra
- 19 (Croatia) Petar Medić
- 26 (Austria) Michael Miskovez
- 32 (Germany) Tobias Grothues

Central Backs

- 8 (Austria) Sebastian Spendier
- 35 (Austria) Thomas Wagner

Right Backs

- 3 (Austria) Thomas Kandolf
- 99 (Austria) Johannes Demmerer

=== Technical staff ===
- Head coach: (Germany) Christoph Jauernik
- Assistant coach: (Germany) Benjamin Riemann
- Fitness coach: (Austria) Hannes Danler
- Physiotherapist: (Austria) Pooya Poostchi
- Club doctor: (Austria) Dr. Albin Kulhanek

=== Transfers ===
Transfers for the 2026–27 season

Joining

- (Netherlands) Robin Leunissen (LB) from (Germany) OHV Aurich
- (Germany) Jonas Riecke (RB) from (Germany) MT Melsungen

Leaving

- (Germany) Tobias Grothues (LB)
- (Austria) Sebastian Spendier (CB) (retires)
- (Austria) Thomas Kandolf (RB) (retires)
- (Austria) Johannes Demmerer (RB)

=== Transfer History ===
Transfers for the 2025–26 season

Joining

- (Netherlands) Jelte Hiemstra (LB) from (Netherlands) Limburg Lions

Leaving

- (Belarus) Aliaksei Kishou (GK) to (Austria) HC Linz AG
- (Austria) Alexander Wanitschek (LW) (retires)
- (Austria) Jonas Magelinskas (CB)

== Accomplishments ==
- Austrian Cup (ÖHB-Cup)
  - Gold: 2025
  - Silver: 2022, 2024
- Austrian Super Cup (HLA Supercup)
  - Gold: 2025

== EHF ranking ==
As of 23/10/2025

Rank	Team	Points
139	(Romania) CSA Steaua București	29
140	(Cyprus) Parnassos Strovolou	28
141	(Sweden) HK Malmö	28
142	(Austria) Handball Tirol	27
143	(Montenegro) RK Budvanska rivijera	27
144	(North Macedonia) GRK Tikveš	27
145	(Iceland) ÍBV	27

== Former club members ==
=== Notable former players ===
The list includes players who have played at least once for their national team or spent at least 10 years with the team.

==== Goalkeepers ====
- (Austria) Christian Aigner (2013–2015)
- (Belarus) Aliaksei Kishou (2015–2018, 2020–2025)
- (Lithuania) Aistis Pažemeckas (2016–2018)

==== Right wingers ====
- (Austria) Richard Wöss (2019–2022)
- (Lithuania) Andrius Račkauskas (2013–2015)

==== Left wingers ====
- (Austria) Manuel Gierlinger (2013–2014)
- (Austria) Alexander Wanitschek (2013–2025)

==== Line players ====
- (Austria) Dominik Bammer (2013–2014)
- (Austria) Balthasar Huber (2013–2021)
- (Austria) Emanuel Petrusic (2017–)
- (Russia) Aleksandr Pyshkin (2017–2020)

==== Left backs ====
- (Austria) Michael Miskovez (2017–)
- (Belarus) Hleb Harbuz (2015–2017)
- (Belarus) Anton Prakapenia (2014–2018)
- (Croatia) Petar Medić (2019–)
- (Greece) Spyros Balomenos (2013–2014)

==== Central backs ====
- (Austria) Damir Djukic (2015–2017)
- (Austria) Sebastian Spendier (2017–2026)
- (Austria) Gerald Zeiner (2020–2022)
- (Croatia) Krešimir Maraković (2013–2015)
- (Denmark) Matias Helt Jepsen (2017–2018)

==== Right backs ====
- (Austria) Armin Hochleitner (2013–2021)
- (Austria) Thomas Kandolf (2013–2018, 2023–2026)

=== Former coaches ===
Seasons	Coach	Country
2013–2014	Erwin Gierlinger	(Austria)
2014–2015	Krešimir Maraković	(Croatia)
2015–2018	Raúl Alonso	(Spain)
2018–2021	Frank Bergemann	(Germany)
2022	Gerald Zeiner	(Austria)
2022	Klaus Hagleitner	(Austria)
2023–	Christoph Jauernik	(Germany)
