= Alpla HC Hard =

Austrian handball club

- Full name: Alpla Handball Club Hard
- Nickname: Die Roten Teufel
- Short name: HC Hard
- Founded: 1986; 40 years ago
- Arena: Sporthalle am See, Hard
- Capacity: 2,400
- President: Günther Lehner
- Head coach: Spyros Balomenos
- League: Handball Liga Austria
- 2023–24: 2nd
- Club colours
Home	Away

Alpla HC Hard is a handball club from Hard, Austria. They currently compete in the Handball Liga Austria.

Location of Alpla HC Hard

== History ==
In 1986, the handball division was separated from the ATSV Hard club, and subsequently the independent club HC 86 Hard was founded. Under the guidance of coach Zoltán Balogh, HC Hard reached the Austrian top flight in the 1997/98 season. In the 2002/03 season, HC Hard won the Austrian Championship for the first time under the guidance of coach Frank Bergemann. In the 2004/05 season, the club won its first victory in the Austrian Cup. The club moved to its new home in the Sporthalle am See in 2005. The club won the championship 7 times in total (2003, 2012, 2013, 2014, 2015, 2017, 2021), the cup 4 times (2005, 2008, 2014, 2018) and the Super Cup 5 times (2012, 2017, 2018, 2019, 2021). In 2007/08, HC Hard reached the final of the EHF Challenge Cup, but won the final against Romanian UCM Sport Reșița with a score of 54:47 on aggregate.

== Crest, colours, supporters ==
=== Naming history ===
Name	Period
HC Alpla Hard	−2002
Alpla HC Hard	2002–2004
HC Superfund Hard	2004–2007
Alpla HC Hard	2007–present

=== Kits ===
HOME
2019–20	2023–24	2024–25

AWAY
2018-19	2019–20

== Sports Hall information ==
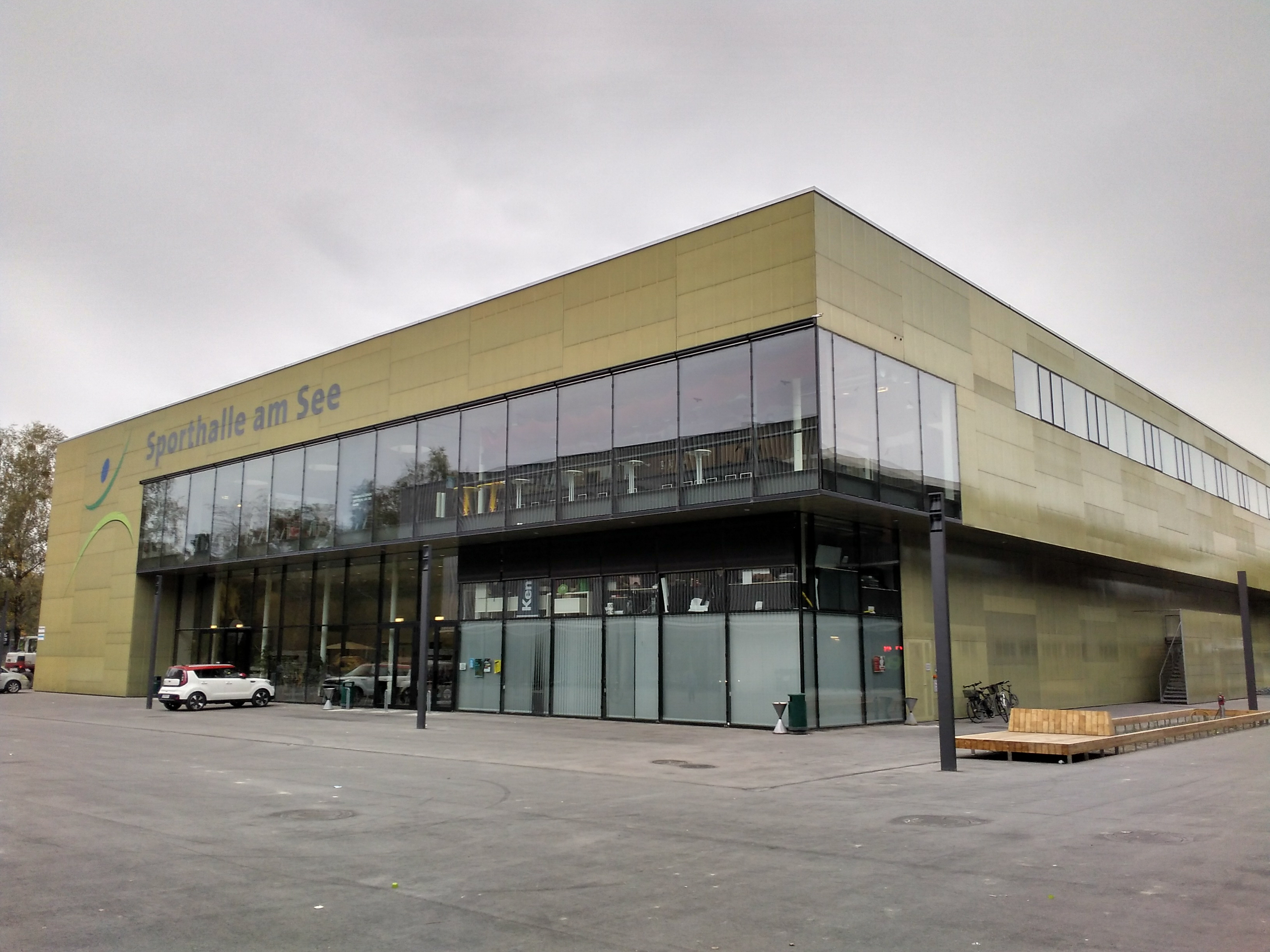
Home hall: Sporthalle am See

- Arena: – Sporthalle am See
- City: – Hard
- Capacity: – 2400
- Address: – Seestraße 60, 6971 Hard, Austria

== Team ==
=== Current squad ===
Squad for the 2022–23 season

Alpla HC Hard

Goalkeepers

- 16 (Austria) Emanuel Baldauf
- 20 (Austria) Benjamin Edionwe
- 32 (Montenegro) (Austria) Golub Doknić

Left Wingers

- 5 (Austria) Manuel Maier
- 7 (Switzerland) (Austria) Luca Raschle

Right Wingers

- 18 (Austria) Paul Schwärzler
- 38 (Austria) Lennio Sgonc

Line Players

- 29 (Austria) Lukas Schweighofer
- 92 (Croatia) Jadranko Stojanović

Central Backs

- 19 (Germany) Nico Schnabl
- 24 (Austria) Linus Weber
- 31 (Iceland) Sigtryggur Daði Rúnarsson

Left Backs

- 3 (Lithuania) Karolis Antanavičius
- 6 (Austria) Dominik Schmid
- 13 (Austria) Frederic Wüstner
- 15 (Austria) Valentin Mischi
- 37 (Croatia) Ivan Horvat

Right Backs

- 8 (Austria) Nikola Stevanovic
- 28 (Bosnia and Herzegovina) Srđan Predragović

=== Technical staff ===
- Head coach: (Greece) Spyros Balomenos
- Assistant coach: (Germany) Benjamin Trautvetter
- Fitness coach: (Austria) Stefan Jäger
- Masseur: (Austria) Martin Maier
- Club Doctor: (Austria) Dr. Michael Fink

=== Transfers ===
Transfers for the 2026–27 season

Joining

- (Greece) Eleftherios Papazoglou (GK) from (Greece) Athinaikos H.C.
- (Denmark) Jens Svane Peschardt (CB) from (Denmark) KIF Kolding
- (Denmark) Mathias Sonne Domino (LB) from (Germany) DHK Flensborg

Leaving

- (Iceland) Tumi Steinn Rúnarsson (CB) to (Austria) HSG Bärnbach/Köflach
- (Iceland) Tryggvi Jónsson (LB) to (Norway) TIF Viking
- (Germany) Caspar Mosblech (LP) to (Germany) SG Pforzheim/Eutingen
- (North Macedonia) Martin Manaskov (LB)
- (Austria) (Montenegro) Golub Doknić (GK) (retires)

=== Transfer History ===
Transfers for the 2025–26 season

Joining

- (Iceland) Tryggvi Jónsson (LB) from (Iceland) Fram Reykjavík
- (North Macedonia) Martin Manaskov (LB) from (North Macedonia) GRK Tikveš
- (Germany) Caspar Mosblech (LP) from (Germany) TSV Bayer Dormagen
- (Austria) Nico Sager (LW) from (Austria) SC Ferlach
- (Austria) Marc-Andre Haunold (LB) from (Germany) ASV Hamm-Westfalen

Leaving

- (Lithuania) Karolis Antanavičius (LB) to (Germany) GWD Minden
- (Croatia) Ivan Horvat (CB) to (Austria) HSG Bärnbach/Köflach
- (Germany) Nico Schnabl (CB) to (Germany) TuS Ferndorf
- (Austria) Samuel Wendel (LW) (retires)

Transfers for the 2022–23 season

Joining

- (Austria) Nikola Stevanovic (RB) from (Greece) AEK Athens
- (Austria) Frederic Wüstner (LB) from (Switzerland) TSV St. Otmar St. Gallen
- (Iceland) Sigtryggur Daði Rúnarsson (CB) from (Iceland) Íþróttabandalag Vestmannaeyja

Leaving

- (Austria) Thomas Hurich (GK) (retires)
- (Austria) Manuel Schmid (CB) (retires)
- (Austria) Robin Kritzinger (RW) to (Austria) Bregenz Handball

== Previous Squads ==
2020–2021 Team
Shirt No	Nationality	Player	Birth Date	Position
1	Austria	Thomas Hurich	6 April 1992 (age 34)	Goalkeeper
3	Austria	Konrad Wurst	30 January 1998 (age 28)	Right Back
5	Austria	Manuel Maier	17 May 1998 (age 28)	Left Winger
6	Austria	Dominik Schmid	7 September 1989 (age 36)	Left Back
7	SwitzerlandAustria	Luca Raschle	6 November 1990 (age 35)	Left Winger
8	Austria	Manuel Schmid	5 November 1993 (age 32)	Central Back
9	Austria	Boris Zivkovic	2 May 1992 (age 34)	Right Back
11	Croatia	Marijan Maric	8 February 1996 (age 30)	Left Back
15	Slovenia	Nejc Zmavc	6 September 1990 (age 35)	Line Player
18	Austria	Paul Schwärzler	7 May 2000 (age 26)	Right Winger
22	Austria	Robin Kritzinger	18 December 2001 (age 24)	Right Winger
23	Serbia	Marko Krsmančić	2 December 1989 (age 36)	Central Back
27	Austria	Thomas Weber	7 June 1987 (age 39)	Left Winger
28	Austria	Lukas Schweighofer	29 December 1992 (age 33)	Line Player
32	MontenegroAustria	Golub Doknić	16 April 1982 (age 44)	Goalkeeper
37	Croatia	Ivan Horvat	17 February 1993 (age 33)	Left Back

2013–2014 Team
Shirt No	Nationality	Player	Birth Date	Position
1	Austria	Thomas Huemer	29 April 1976 (age 50)	Goalkeeper
4	Croatia	Krešimir Kozina	25 June 1990 (age 36)	Line Player
6	Austria	Dominik Schmid	7 September 1989 (age 36)	Left Back
7	SwitzerlandAustria	Luca Raschle	6 November 1990 (age 35)	Left Winger
8	Austria	Dominik Wetzel	16 June 1989 (age 37)	Line Player
9	Austria	Boris Zivkovic	2 May 1992 (age 34)	Right Back
11	Austria	Michael Jochum	8 November 1985 (age 40)	Left Winger
13	SerbiaAustria	Marko Tanasković	6 June 1985 (age 41)	Right Back
16	Austria	Martin Kalischnig	8 June 1986 (age 40)	Goalkeeper
18	Austria	Bernd Friede	18 February 1980 (age 46)	Central Back
19	Austria	Rene Pascal Rigas	19 March 1990 (age 36)	Right Winger
21	Austria	Michael Knauth	7 January 1983 (age 43)	Right Winger
23	Serbia	Marko Krsmančić	2 December 1989 (age 36)	Central Back
26	Austria	Lukas Herburger	19 December 1994 (age 31)	Line Player
27	Austria	Thomas Weber	7 June 1987 (age 39)	Left Winger
28	Austria	Gerald Zeiner	28 June 1988 (age 38)	Central Back
32	MontenegroAustria	Golub Doknić	16 April 1982 (age 44)	Goalkeeper

2007–2008 Team
Shirt No	Nationality	Player	Birth Date	Position
1	Austria	Thomas Huemer	29 April 1976 (age 50)	Goalkeeper
2	Austria	Christoph Jochum	19 July 1987 (age 39)	Left Winger
3	Austria	Christian Grebien	18 March 1979 (age 47)	Line Player
4	Austria	Alexander Kathrein	14 May 1983 (age 43)	Left Winger
5	Poland	Damian Moszczynski	20 January 1980 (age 46)	Left Back
6	Austria	Dominik Schmid	7 September 1989 (age 36)	Left Back
10	Austria	Wolfgang Fürstler	5 January 1989 (age 37)	Left Back
11	Austria	Michael Jochum	8 November 1985 (age 40)	Left Winger
12	Austria	Jürgen Suppanschitz	11 March 1986 (age 40)	Goalkeeper
14	Latvia	Margots Valkovskis	30 September 1976 (age 49)	Line Player
16	Austria	Simon Wallner	3 October 1989 (age 36)	Goalkeeper
17	Austria	Stefan Watzl	20 November 1981 (age 44)	Central Back
18	Austria	Bernd Friede	18 February 1980 (age 46)	Central Back
19	Austria	Rene Pascal Rigas	19 March 1990 (age 36)	Right Winger
20	Germany	Björn Navarin	20 September 1975 (age 50)	Left Back
22	Poland	Damian Wleklak	28 February 1976 (age 50)	Central Back
27	Austria	Stefan Klement	4 June 1979 (age 47)	Right Back
33	Germany	Markus Pregler	6 November 1971 (age 54)	Line Player
77	Austria	Robert Weber	25 November 1985 (age 40)	Right Winger

== EHF ranking ==
As of 5/12/2025

Rank	Team	Points
167	(Azerbaijan) HC Baki	21
168	(Denmark) TTH Holstebro	21
169	(Iceland) Stjarnan	20
170	(Austria) Alpla HC Hard	20
171	(Croatia) MRK Čakovec	19
172	(Belarus) HC Meshkov Brest	19
173	(Netherlands) JD Techniek Hurry-Up	19

== Former club members ==
=== Notable former players ===
- (Austria) Harald Beilschmied (2000–2001)
- (Austria) Daniel Dicker (2014–2018)
- (Austria) Wolfgang Filzwieser (2002–2007)
- (Austria) Bernd Friede (1999–2008, 2010–2014)
- (Austria) (Switzerland) Guido Graf (1998–2002)
- (Austria) Lukas Herburger (2011–2018)
- (Austria) Maximilian Hermann (2018–2020)
- (Austria) Michael Knauth (2008–2018)
- (Austria) Roland Schlinger (2014–2017)
- (Austria) Dominik Schmid (2008–2014, 2015–)
- (Austria) Lukas Schweighofer (2018–)
- (Austria) Nikola Stevanovic (2022–)
- (Austria) Ibish Thaqi (2006–2007)
- (Austria) Markus Wagesreiter (2005–2007)
- (Austria) Robert Weber (2004–2008)
- (Austria) Frederic Wüstner (2012–2018, 2022–)
- (Austria) Gerald Zeiner (2013–2020)
- (Austria) Boris Zivkovic (2011–2021)
- (Bosnia and Herzegovina) Srđan Predragović (2021–)
- (Croatia) Ivan Horvat (2018–)
- (Croatia) Bruno Kozina (2019–2020)
- (Croatia) Krešimir Kozina (2013–2015)
- (Iceland) Sigtryggur Daði Rúnarsson (2022–)
- (Latvia) Mārtiņs Lībergs (2003–2005)
- (North Macedonia) (Croatia) Risto Arnaudovski (2017–2019)
- (Montenegro) (Austria) Golub Doknić (2011–)
- (Poland) Damian Wleklak (2007–2009)
- (Russia) Stanislav Kulinchenko (2004–2007)
- (Serbia) Marko Krsmančić (2011–2015, 2020–2021)
- (Serbia) Mitar Markez (2014–2015)
- (Switzerland) (Austria) Luca Raschle (2009–)

=== Former coaches ===
Seasons	Coach	Country
1999–2000	Niels Möller	(Denmark)
2000–2005	Frank Bergemann	(Germany)
2005–2007	Goran Zivkovic	(Bosnia and Herzegovina)
2007–2008	Gerald Gabl	(Austria)
2008–2010	Zbigniew Tłuczyński	(Poland)
2010–2016	Markus Burger	(Austria)
2016–2018	Petr Hrachovec	(Czech Republic)
2018–2020	Klaus Gärtner	(Germany)
2020–2021	Mario Bjeliš	(Croatia)
2021–2026	Hannes Jón Jónsson	(Iceland)
2026–	Spyros Balomenos	(Greece)
