= Vizvary =

Vizvary or Vizváry or Vizvári is a Hungarian surname. Notable people with the surname include:

- Istvan Vizvary (born 1975), Polish science fiction writer
- Kristof Vizvary (born 1983), Austrian handball player
- Matúš Vizváry (born 1989), Slovak ice hockey player
- Sylvia Čápová-Vizváry (born 1947), Slovak pianist
- György Vízvári, Hungarian water polo player
- Gyula Vízvári (1841–1908), Hungarian actor, theatre director, and professor
- Mariska Vízváry (1877–1954), Hungarian actress
- Matúš Vizváry, Slovak professional ice hockey player
