= Austrian Handball Federation =

Governing body of handball in Austria

Austrian Handball Federation German: Österreichischer Handballbund ÖHB
- IOC nation: Republic of Austria (AUT)
- Sport: Handball
- Other sports: Beach handball; Wheelchair handball
- Official website: www.oehb.sportlive.at

HISTORY
- Year of formation: 25 January 1925; 101 years ago

DEMOGRAPHICS
- Membership size: 9 Full Members

AFFILIATIONS
- International federation: International Handball Federation (IHF)
- IHF member since: 11 July 1946; 80 years ago
- Continental association: European Handball Federation
- National Olympic Committee: Austrian Olympic Committee
- Other affiliation(s): Federal Ministry for National Defence and Sport

GOVERNING BODY
- President: Mr. Gerhard Hofbauer (Austria)

HEADQUARTERS
- Address: Hauslabgasse, Vienna
- Country: Austria
- Secretary General: Mr. Martin Hausleitner

FINANCE
- Sponsors: Ströck; Admiral; Kempa; Allianz; Lidl; Intersport; Wiesbauer fanreisen.com Arcotel Hotels; MG Motor

The Austrian Handball Federation (German: Österreichischer Handballbund) (ÖHB) is the national organization responsible for managing and promoting the practice of handball and beach handball in Austria. Its head office is located in Vienna. ÖHB was founded on 25 January 1925 and is affiliated to the International Handball Federation, European Handball Federation and Austrian Olympic Committee. Current president of ÖHB is Mr. Gerhard Hofbauer, who held the position since 1996. Mr. Martin Hausleitner is current secretary general of ÖHB.

== Competitions ==
- Handball Liga Austria
- Women Handball Liga Austria

== National teams ==
=== Handball ===
- Austria men's national handball team
- Austria men's national junior handball team
- Austria men's national youth handball team
- Austria women's national handball team
- Austria women's national junior handball team
- Austria women's national youth handball team

=== Beach Handball ===
- Austria national beach handball team
- Austria women's national beach handball team

== See also ==
- List of handball clubs in Austria
