= Union Handballklub Krems =

Austrian handball club

Förthof UHK Krems
- Full name: Förthof Union Handballklub Krems
- Short name: UHK
- Founded: 1947; 79 years ago
- Arena: Sporthalle Krems, Krems an der Donau
- Capacity: 1,500
- President: Bernhard Lackner
- Head coach: Ibish Thaqi
- League: Handball Liga Austria
- Club colours
Home	Away

Förthof UHK Krems is a professional handball club from Krems an der Donau, Austria. They currently compete in the Handball Liga Austria.

Location of Union Handballklub Krems

== History ==
In 1947 the UHK Krems was founded as the handball section of Union Krems. It has always been in the Austrian First Division since the 2002/2003 season. They won the championship 6 times (1973, 1975, 1977, 2019, 2022, 2025), they were cup winners 5 times (1973, 1975, 1978, 2010, 2019).

== Crest, colours, supporters ==
=== Club crest ===
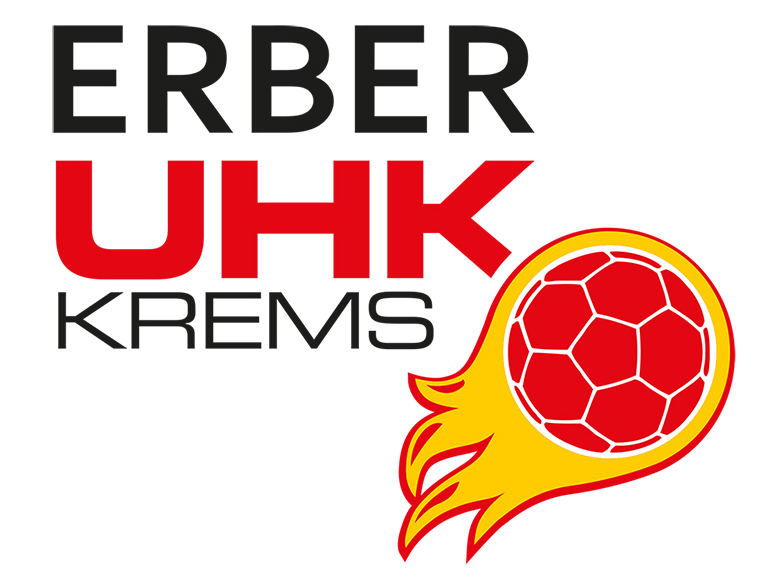
Old Logo
(-2021)

=== Kit manufacturers ===
Period	Kit manufacturer
– 2014	(Germany) Puma
2014 – 2021	(Denmark) Hummel
2021 – present	(Germany) Puma

=== Kits ===
HOME
2010–14	2014-17	2017-20	2020-21	2021–23

AWAY
2010–14	2015-16	2018-20	2020-21	2021–24	2024–25

THIRD
2011–14

== Sports Hall information ==
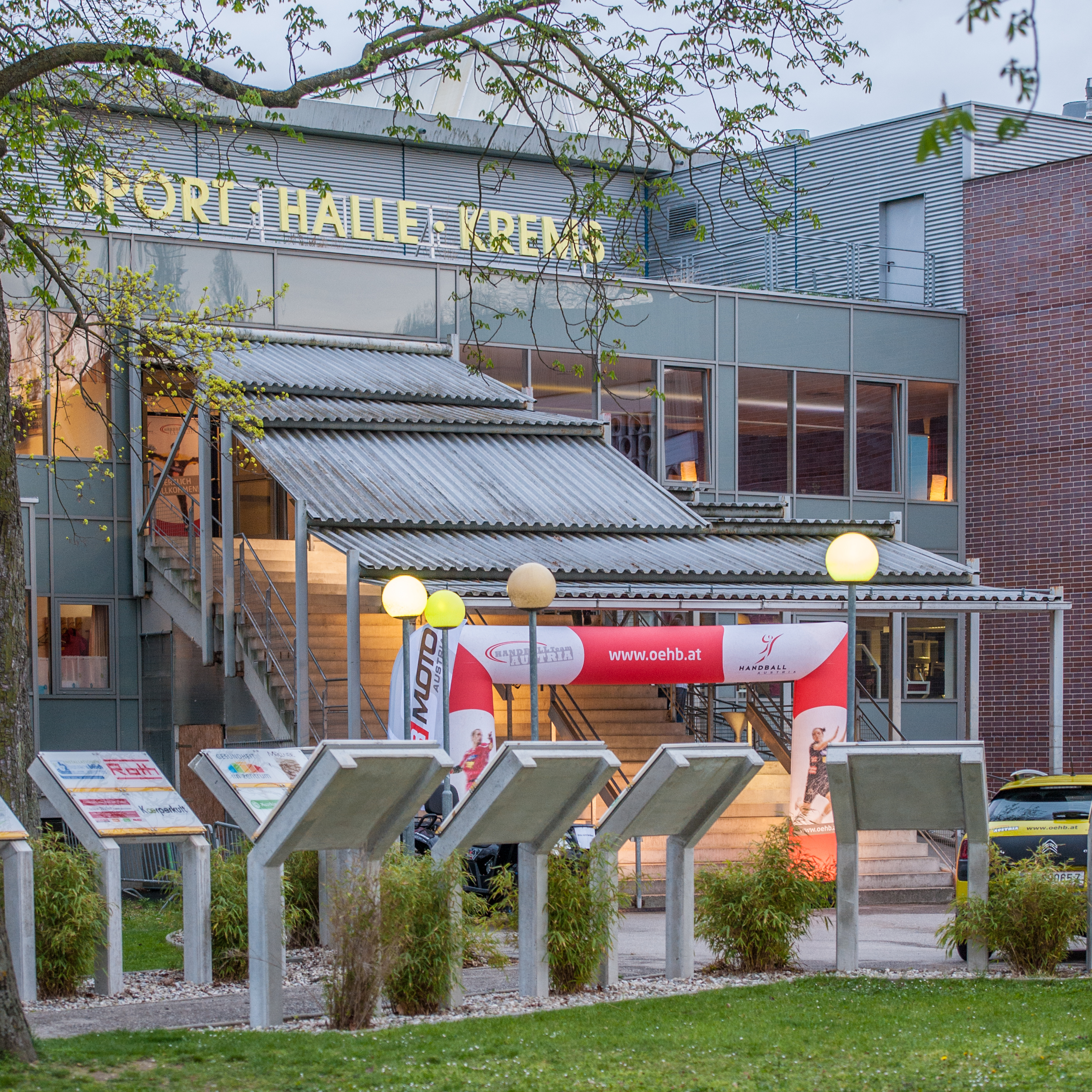
Home hall: Sporthalle Krems

- Arena: – Sporthalle Krems
- City: – Krems an der Donau
- Capacity: – 1500
- Address: – Strandbadstraße 3, 3500 Krems an der Donau, Austria

== Management ==
Position	Name
President	(Austria) Bernhard Lackner
Vice-president	(Austria) Josef Nussbaum
Honorary President	(Austria) Hans Penz
Member Of The Board	(Austria) Alois Autherith
Member Of The Board	(Austria) Christoph Hofbauer
Member Of The Board	(Austria) Gudrun Kanzler

== Team ==
=== Current squad ===
Squad for the 2022–23 season

Förthof UHK Krems

Goalkeepers

- 22 (Austria) Lukas Domevscek
- 36 (Slovakia) Samuel Fabry
- 40 (Austria) Thomas Eichberger

Left Wingers

- 6 (Austria) Jonathan Provin
- 10 (Austria) Tobias Auss
- 12 (Austria) Fabian Hellerschmid
- 29 (Austria) Julian Pratschner

Right Wingers

- 11 (Austria) Matthias Führer
- 14 (Austria) Benedikt Rudischer
- 17 (Austria) Stephan Wiesbauer
- 26 (Austria) Jakob Schwanzer

Line Players

- 2 (Austria) Yannick Beron
- 15 (Austria) Kenan Hasecic
- 20 (Austria) Sinan Alkic

Central Backs

- 7 (Austria) Moritz Schobert
- 8 (Austria) Marko Simek
- 23 (Austria) Mario Lippitsch

Left Backs

- 4 (Austria) Lukas Nikolic
- 5 (Austria) (Lithuania) Romas Kirveliavičius
- 21 (Hungary) Gábor Hajdú
- 24 (Austria) Daniel Dicker
- 28 (Austria) Sebastian Feichtinger
- 32 (Austria) Paul Hofmann

Right Backs

- 9 (Croatia) Rudolf Bobaš

=== Technical staff ===
- Head coach: (Austria) Ibish Thaqi
- Assistant coach: (Austria) Jörg Merten
- Physiotherapist: (Austria) Claudia Nachtnebel

=== Transfers ===
Transfers for the 2026–27 season

Joining

- (Norway) Jonas Myreng Elverhøy (LB) from (Norway) Kristiansand Topphåndball
- (Germany) Maxim Schalles (RW) from (Germany) TV Großwallstadt
- (Austria) Christoph Barta (RW) from (Austria) Jags Vöslau

Leaving

- (Germany) Thies Bergemann (RW) to (Germany) TuS N-Lübbecke
- (Slovenia) Domen Knez (LB) to (Austria) HSG Bärnbach/Köflach
- (Austria) Marc Gaydusek (RW) to (Austria) BT Füchse
- (Austria) Tobias Auss (LW) to (Austria) UHC Eggenburg
- (Austria) Tilen Pausits (CB) to (Germany) TSG Altenhagen-Heepen

=== Transfer History ===
Transfers for the 2025–26 season

Joining

- (Slovenia) Domen Knez (LB) from (Austria) HSG Bärnbach/Köflach
- (Finland) Robin Granlund (LB) from (Germany) Bergischer HC

Leaving

- (Slovakia) Samuel Fabry (GK) to (Austria) UHC Hollabrunn

Transfers for the 2022–23 season

Joining

- (Austria) Thomas Eichberger (GK) from (Germany) ThSV Eisenach
- (Austria) Daniel Dicker (LB) from (Germany) ThSV Eisenach
- (Austria) Julian Pratschner (LW) from (Austria) WAT Fünfhaus

Leaving

- (Austria) Jakob Jochmann (CB) (retires)
- (Austria) Fabian Posch (LP) to (Austria) JAGS Vöslau
- (Austria) Igor Vuckovic (LB) to (Germany) TV 08 Willstätt
- (Slovenia) Gašper Hrastnik (RB) to (Slovenia) RD Ribnica

== Previous Squads ==
2021–2022 Team
Shirt No	Nationality	Player	Birth Date	Position
3	Austria	Jakob Jochmann	2 October 1993 (age 32)	Central Back
4	Austria	Lukas Nikolic	9 April 2001 (age 25)	Left Back
5	AustriaLithuania	Romas Kirveliavičius	5 March 1988 (age 38)	Left Back
8	Austria	Marko Simek	30 June 1995 (age 31)	Central Back
9	Croatia	Rudolf Bobaš	1 September 2002 (age 24)	Right Back
10	Austria	Tobias Auss	26 February 2000 (age 26)	Left Winger
11	Austria	Matthias Führer	19 March 1994 (age 32)	Right Winger
14	Austria	Fabian Posch	5 January 1988 (age 38)	Line Player
15	Austria	Kenan Hasecic	15 May 1996 (age 30)	Line Player
17	Austria	Stephan Wiesbauer	17 April 2000 (age 26)	Right Winger
20	Austria	Igor Vuckovic	20 April 1998 (age 28)	Left Back
21	Hungary	Gábor Hajdú	20 October 1989 (age 36)	Left Back
22	Austria	Lukas Domevscek	10 June 1999 (age 27)	Goalkeeper
23	Austria	Mario Lippitsch	2 July 2002 (age 24)	Central Back
24	Austria	Benedikt Rudischer	21 July 2003 (age 23)	Right Winger
26	Austria	Jakob Schwanzer	26 July 2005 (age 21)	Right Winger
28	Austria	Sebastian Feichtinger	5 June 1992 (age 34)	Left Back
36	Slovakia	Samuel Fabry	1 January 2001 (age 25)	Goalkeeper
77	Slovenia	Gašper Hrastnik	13 November 1992 (age 33)	Right Back

2008–2009 Team
Shirt No	Nationality	Player	Birth Date	Position
5	Austria	Bernhard Grabner	10 August 1985 (age 41)	Line Player
6	AustriaCroatia	Ivica Belas	22 March 1977 (age 49)	Central Back
7	Austria	Mario Osimitz	17 July 1988 (age 38)	Right Winger
8	Czech Republic	Pavel Hrachovec	24 March 1974 (age 52)	Left Winger
11	Austria	Gerald Zeiner	28 June 1988 (age 38)	Left Winger
15	Austria	Kristof Vizvary	21 August 1983 (age 43)	Left Back
16	Austria	Bernhard Binder	27 October 1977 (age 48)	Goalkeeper
17	Austria	Tobias Schopf	15 December 1985 (age 40)	Left Winger
18	Austria	Ibish Thaqi	21 March 1980 (age 46)	Central Back
19	Austria	Patrik Lachmann	12 September 1977 (age 49)	Right Winger
20	Austria	Christoph Svoboda	16 April 1990 (age 36)	Right Back
21	Austria	Daniel Kottan	19 June 1989 (age 37)	Left Back
22	Austria	Georg Chalupa	1 November 1984 (age 41)	Left Back
23	Austria	Peter Marek	17 February 1989 (age 37)	Right Back
25	Serbia	Rados Pesic	3 December 1980 (age 45)	Right Back
30	Austria	Werner Lint	4 December 1978 (age 47)	Line Player
61	Austria	Wolfgang Filzwieser	30 September 1984 (age 41)	Goalkeeper

== Titles ==
- Handball Liga Austria
  - Winner (6) : 1973, 1975, 1977, 2019, 2022, 2025
- Austrian Cup
  - Winner (5) : 1979, 1980, 1984, 2010, 2019

In the 1978/79, 1979/80 and 1983/84 seasons, the UHK Krems was automatically Austrian Cup winner as runner-up in the championship and qualified for the international cup winner competition.

== EHF ranking ==
As of 5/12/2025

Rank	Team	Points
71	(Cyprus) Anorthosis Famagusta	72
72	(Iceland) Haukar	72
73	(Slovenia) MRK Krka	72
74	(Austria) Union Handballklub Krems	71
75	(Czech Republic) SKKP Brno	70
76	(Poland) Chrobry Głogów	69
77	(Italy) Raimond Sassari	67

== Former club members ==
=== Notable former players ===
- (Austria) (Croatia) Ivica Belas (2008–2016)
- (Austria) Daniel Dicker (2022–)
- (Austria) Thomas Eichberger (2022–)
- (Austria) Sebastian Feichtinger (2021–)
- (Austria) Wolfgang Filzwieser (2008–2013)
- (Austria) Jakob Jochmann (2017–2022)
- (Austria) Thomas Kandolf (2018–2020)
- (Austria) (Lithuania) Romas Kirveliavičius (2021–)
- (Austria) Werner Lint (2008–2014)
- (Austria) Christoph Neuhold (2013–2016)
- (Austria) Fabian Posch (2016–2022)
- (Austria) Julian Pratschner (2022–)
- (Austria) Tobias Schopf (2005–2018)
- (Austria) Ibish Thaqi (2005–2006, 2007-2009)
- (Austria) Kristof Vizvary (2008–2013, 2014-2016)
- (Austria) Gerald Zeiner (2005–2009)
- (Croatia) Ivan Vukas (2009–2011)
- (Hungary) Gábor Hajdú (2018–)
- (Hungary) (Austria) Norbert Visy (2009–2018)
- (Lithuania) Gerdas Babarskas (2012–2015)
- (North Macedonia) Petar Angelov (2018)
- (North Macedonia) Vlatko Mitkov (2012–2018)
- (Montenegro) Aleksandar Glendža (2020)
- (Slovakia) Michal Shejbal (2012–2016, 2018-2020)

=== Former coaches ===
Seasons	Coach	Country
2006–2007	István Gulyás	(Hungary)
2007–2013	István Szilágyi	(Hungary)
2013–2016	Ivica Belas	(Austria) (Croatia)
2016–	Ibish Thaqi	(Austria)
