= Maja Svetik =

Slovenian handball player (born 1996)

Personal information
- Nationality: Slovenian
- Born: 9 March 1996 (age 30) Šempeter pri Gorici, Slovenia
- Height: 1.67 m (5 ft 6 in)

Sport
- Sport: Handball
- Position: Left wing
- Current club: RK Krim
- Number: 99

Senior clubs
- Years: Team
- –2020: ŽRK Ajdovščina
- 2020–2023: RK Krim
- 2023–: BT Füchse
National team
Years	Team	Apps	(Gls)
2019-	Slovenia	68	(76)
- Updated on 12 October 2024

Maja Svetik (born 9 March 1996) is a Slovenian handball player for the Austrian club BT Füchse and the Slovenian national team.

She represented Slovenia at the 2019 World Women's Handball Championship.
