= Karl-Heinz Lehner =

Austrian operatic bass-baritone

Karl-Heinz Lehner is an Austrian operatic and concert bass-baritone.

== Life ==
Born in Eggenburg, Lehner began his musical education during hisschool years with the Altenburger Sängerknaben as soprano and alto. After the Abitur, he studied at the Universität für Musik und darstellende Kunst Wien, wo Leopold Spitzer in singing and Edith Mathis in Lied and oratorio were his teachers.

After completing his training, Lehner received his first permanent engagement at the Stadttheater Bremerhaven, which he left after two seasons to move to the Opernhaus Dortmund, where he had the opportunity to work on an extensive repertoire. He then moved to the Aalto-Theater in Essen.

He received guest contracts at the Komische Oper Berlin, the Volksoper Wien and the Opernhaus Graz, and he performed as King Marke at the Teatro dell'Opera di Roma and as Colline at the Bregenzer Festspiele. He made his debut as Sparafucile at the Hamburgische Staatsoper and as Orest at the Bayerische Staatsoper in Munich.

Since 2006, Lehner has performed in various roles at the Bayreuth Festival.

In addition to his opera activities, Lehner is also a concert singer. This activity has taken him to the Wiener Konzerthaus, the Konzerthaus Dortmund, the Wiener Musikverein, the Salzburg Festival and the Saalbau Essen.

He has worked with the conductors Georges Prêtre, Philippe Jordan, Ulf Schirmer, Leopold Hager, Jac van Steen, Stefan Soltesz, Axel Kober and Gabriel Feltz. Among the directors under whom he worked were Claus Guth, Jens-Daniel Herzog, Stefan Herheim and Anselm Weber.

== Repertoire ==
- Méphistophélès in Faust
- Sarastro in the Magic Flute
- Il Commendatore in Don Giovanni
- Colline in La Bohème
- Baron Ochs auf Lerchenau in Der Rosenkavalier
- Lodovico in Otello
- Sparafucile in Rigoletto
- Titurel in Parsifal
- Fafner in Das Rheingold and Siegfried
- A night guard in Die Meistersinger von Nürnberg
- Hermann, Landgraf von Thüringen in Tannhäuser
- König Marke in Tristan und Isolde

== Awards ==
- 2000: Förderpreis des Landes Nordrhein-Westfalen für junge Künstlerinnen und Künstler
