= Jakob Jochmann =

Austrian handball player (born 1993)

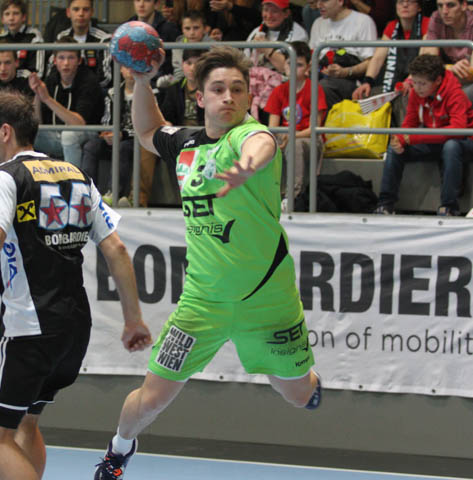

Personal information
- Nationality: Austrian
- Born: 2 October 1993 (age 33) Vienna, Austria
- Height: 1.78 m (5 ft 10 in)

Sport
- Sport: Handball
- Position: Centre back
- Current club: WAT Fünfhaus

Youth career
- Years: Team
- –2011: WAT Fünfhaus

Senior clubs
- Years: Team
- 2011–2014: WAT Fünfhaus
- 2014–2017: SG Handball West Wien
- 2017–2022: UHK Krems
- 2026–: WAT Fünfhaus
National team
Years	Team	Apps	(Gls)
–	Austria	22	(24)
- Updated on 6 March 2026

Jakob Jochmann (born 2 October 1993) is an Austrian handball player for WAT Fünfhaus and the Austrian national team.

He represented Austria at the 2020 European Men's Handball Championship.

He retired in 2022 while playing for UHK Krems, but made a return in 2026 for his childhood club WAT Fünfhaus. With UHK Krems he won the Austrian Championship in 2019 and 2022, as well as the Austrian Cup in 2019.
