= Eggenburg =

- Municipality
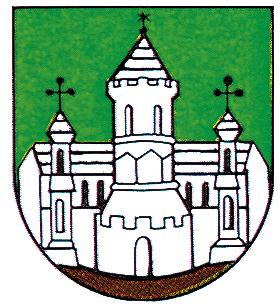
- Coat of arms

- Location within Austria
- Coordinates: 48°39′N 15°49′E
- Country: Austria
- State: Lower Austria
- District: Horn

Government
  - Mayor: Georg Gilli

Area
  - Total: 23.54 km^{2} (9.09 sq mi)
- Elevation: 329 m (1,079 ft)

Population (2018-01-01)
  - Total: 3,540
  - Density: 150/km^{2} (389/sq mi)
- Time zone: UTC+1 (CET)
  - Summer (DST): UTC+2 (CEST)
- Postal code: 3730
- Area code: 02984
- Website: www.eggenburg.gv.at

Eggenburg is a town in the district of Horn in Lower Austria, Austria.

== Population ==
Historical population
Year	Pop.	±%
1869	2,431	—
1880	2,729	+12.3%
1890	3,222	+18.1%
1900	4,106	+27.4%
1910	4,822	+17.4%
1923	4,257	−11.7%
1934	4,154	−2.4%
1939	4,930	+18.7%
1951	4,456	−9.6%
1961	4,016	−9.9%
1971	3,730	−7.1%
1981	3,680	−1.3%
1991	3,625	−1.5%
2001	3,645	+0.6%
2011	3,602	−1.2%

== Gallery ==
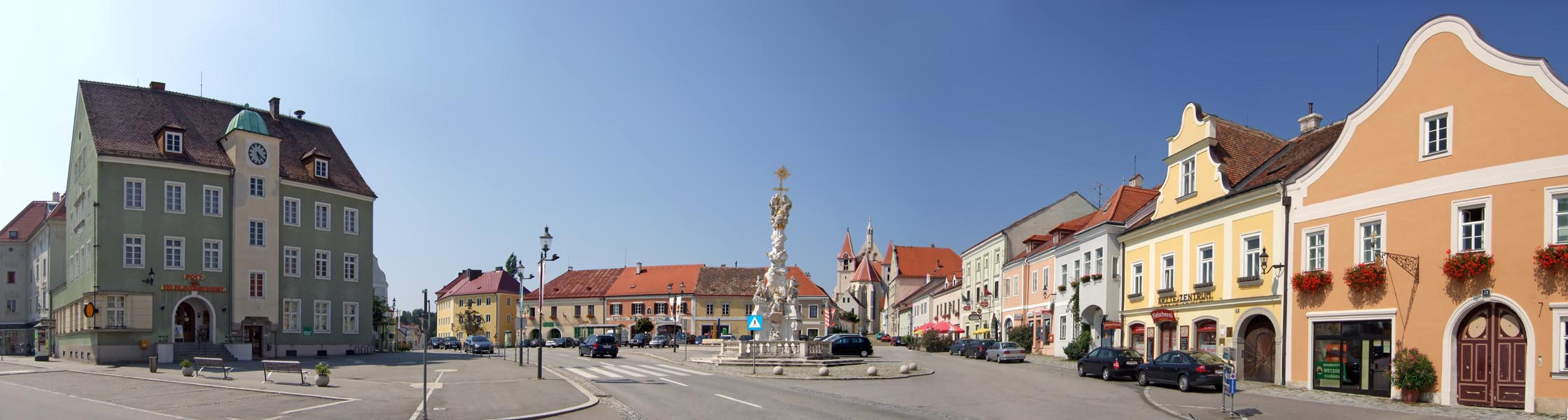
Eggenburg

== Notable people ==
- Johann Zelebor (1819–1869), naturalist, illustrator, and zoologist
- Maria Teschler-Nicola (born 1950), human biologist, anthropologist and ethnologist
- Burkhard Stangl (born 1960), a composer and musician, mainly plays guitar and electronics,
- Karl-Heinz Lehner (born ca. 1975), an Austrian operatic and concert bass-baritone.
- Tobias Schopf (born 1985), an Austrian handball player who has played 18 games for Austria
- Dominik Hofbauer (born 1990), an Austrian footballer who has played over 210 games
