= Bruno Kozina =

Croatian handball player (born 1992)

Personal information
- Full name: Bruno Kozina
- Nationality: (Croatia) Croatian
- Born: 7 January 1992 (age 34) Derventa, Bosnia and Herzegovina
- Height: 1.85 m (6 ft 1 in)

Sport
- Sport: Handball
- Position: Centre back
- Current club: (Switzerland) HSC Kreuzlingen
- Number: 74

Youth career
- Years: Team
- –: RK Matulji
- –: RK Zamet

Senior clubs
- Years: Team
- 2009–2011: RK Zamet
- 2011–2012: HRK Karlovac
- 2012–2014: RK Buzet
- 2014–2015: Kadetten Schaffhausen
- 2015–2017: RTV 1879 Basel
- 2017–2018: Cesson Rennes MHB
- 2018–2019: RTV 1879 Basel
- 2019: Alpla HC Hard
- 2020: Váci KSE
- 2020–2021: BM Puerto Sagunto
- 2021–2022: Csurgói KK
- 2022–: HSC Kreuzlingen

Bruno Kozina (born 7 January 1992) is a Croatian handball player who plays for HSC Kreuzlingen.

== Club career ==
Kozina started his professional career at RK Zamet, the premier handball club of Rijeka. He also plays for Croatian Premier League clubs HRK Karlovac and RK Buzet. In the 2014/15 season, he moved to Swiss handball club Kadetten Schaffhausen. One year later he signed a contract with another Swiss club RTV 1879 Basel. In November 2017, he joined French side Cesson Rennes MHB. In the 2018/19 season he returned to RTV 1879 Basel. In October 2019, he signed a contract with Alpla HC Hard. In Januar 2020 he signed a contract with Váci KSE. In the 2020/21 season he signed with the Spanish club BM Puerto Sagunto. In the 2021/22 season he signed with the Hungarian club Csurgói KK. In the 2022/23 season, he returned to the Swiss Quickline Handball League to play for HSC Kreuzlingen.

== Individual honours ==
- Season 2015/16 best field scorer in Swiss Handball League with 140 goals in 30 games.
- Season 2016/17 third field scorer in Swiss Handball League with 141 goals in 28 games.

== Personal life ==
Bruno has an older brother Krešimir who is also a handball player.
