= Tobias Schopf =

Austrian handball player (born 1985)

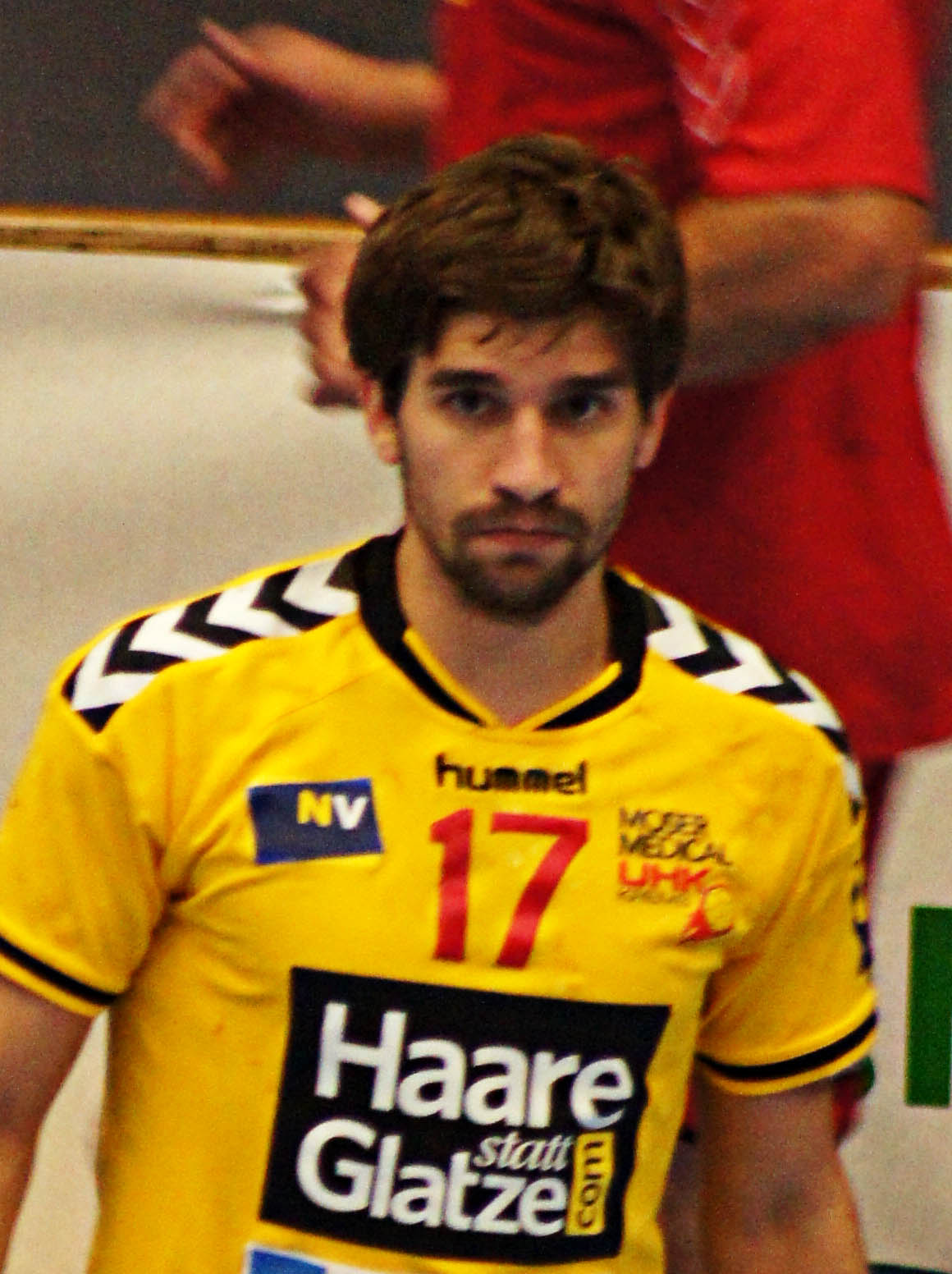

Personal information
- Nationality: Austrian
- Born: 25 December 1985 (age 40) Eggenburg, Austria
- Height: 1.70 m (5 ft 7 in)

Sport
- Sport: Handball
- Position: Left wing
- Current club: UHK Krems
- Number: 17
National team
Years	Team	Apps	(Gls)
–	Austria	18	(15)

Tobias Schopf (born 25 December 1985) is an Austrian handball player for UHK Krems and the Austrian national team.

He participated at the 2018 European Men's Handball Championship.
