= Sebastian Spendier =

Austrian handball player (born 1996)

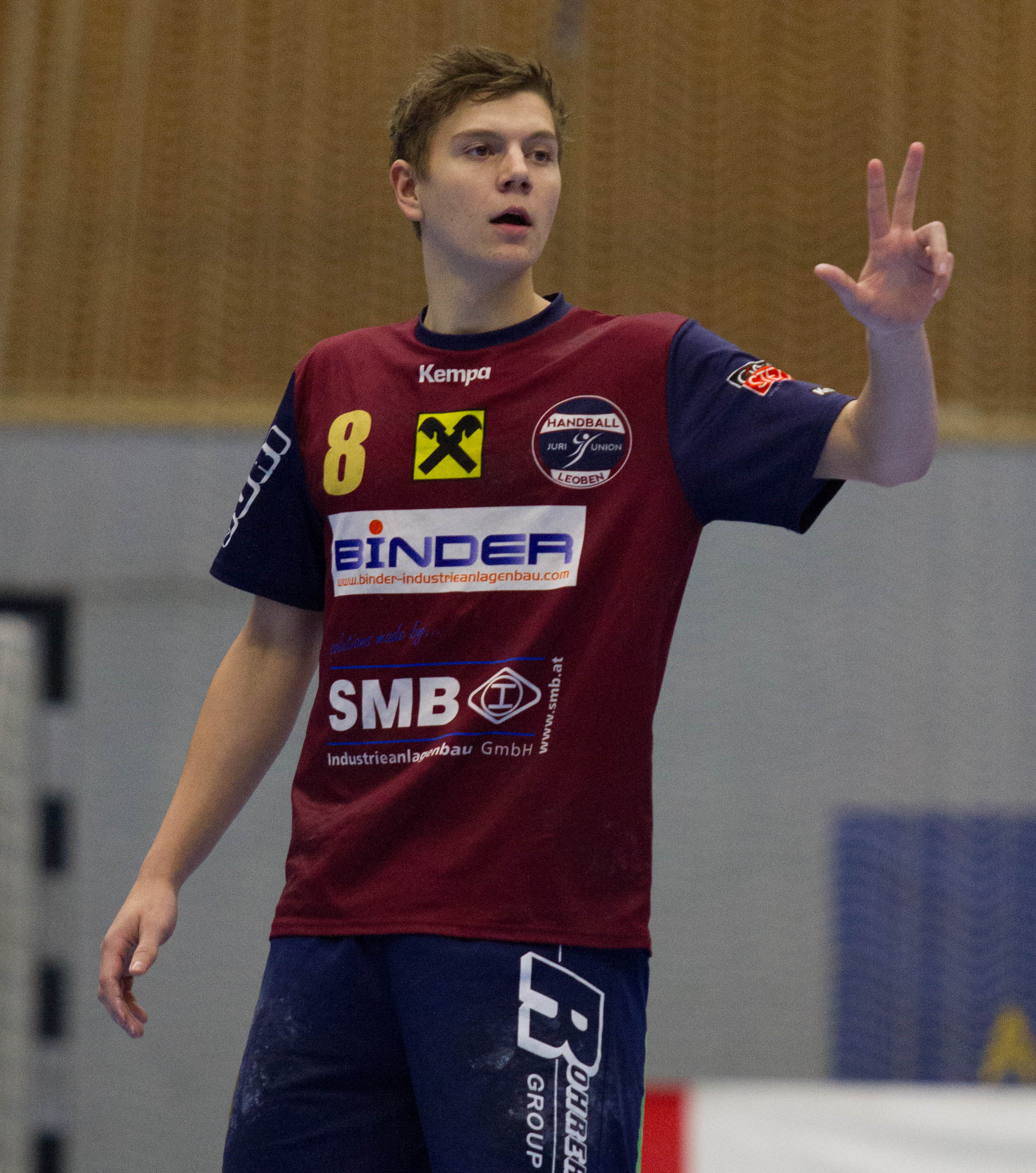

Personal information
- Nationality: Austrian
- Born: 17 December 1996 (age 29) Klagenfurt, Austria
- Height: 1.89 m (6 ft 2 in)

Sport
- Sport: Handball
- Position: Centre back
- Current club: Handball Tirol
- Number: 8
National team
Years	Team	Apps	(Gls)
2018–	Austria	10	(5)

Sebastian Spendier (born 17 December 1996) is an Austrian handball player for Handball Tirol and the Austrian national team.

He represented Austria at the 2019 World Men's Handball Championship.
