= Krešimir Kozina =

Croatian handball player (born 1990)

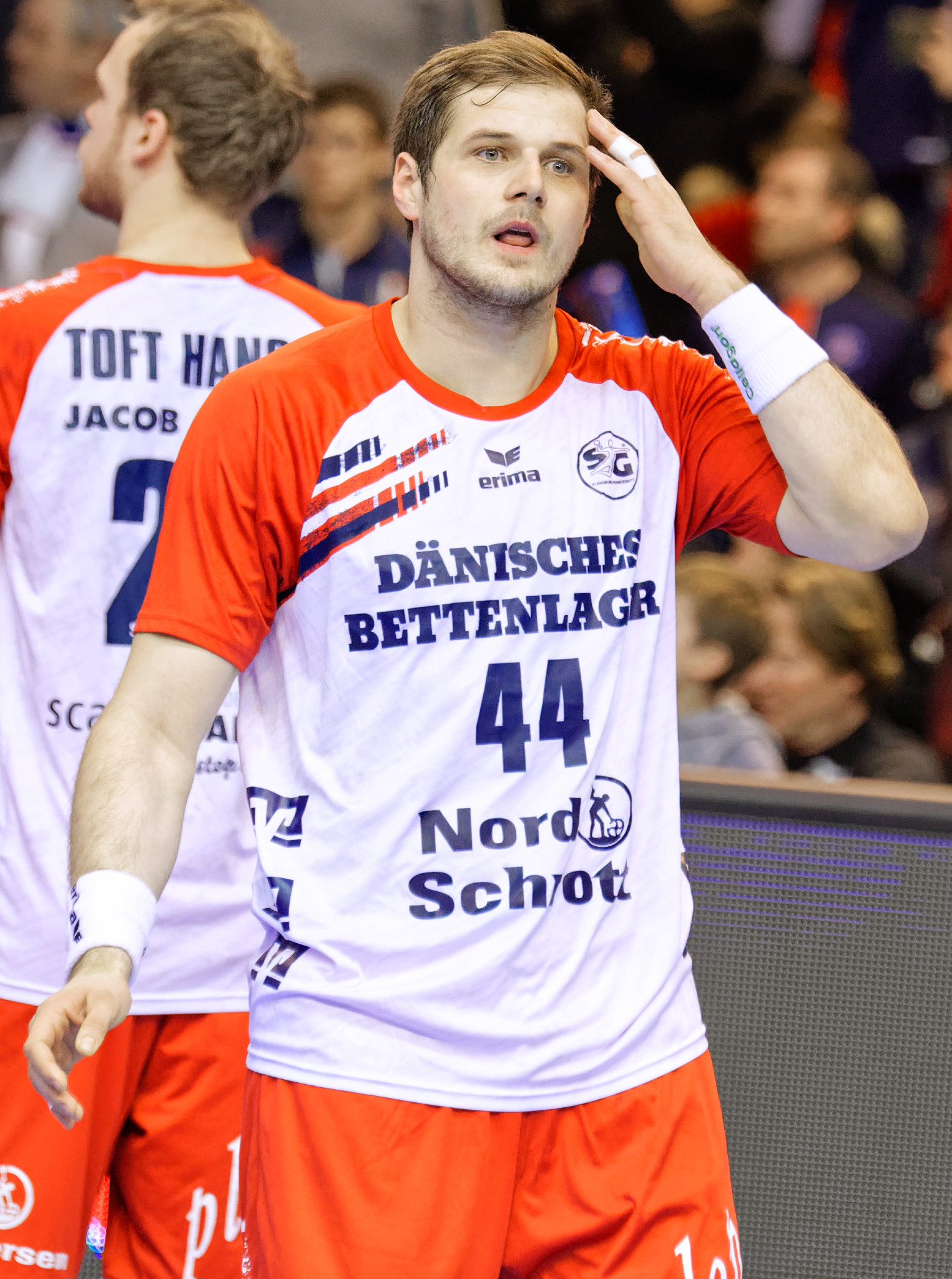
- Krešimir Kozina in 2016

Personal information
- Nationality: Croatian
- Born: 25 June 1990 (age 36) Derventa, SR Bosnia and Herzegovina, SFR Yugoslavia
- Height: 1.96 m (6 ft 5 in)

Sport
- Sport: Handball
- Position: Pivot
- Current club: Frisch Auf Göppingen
- Number: 44

Youth career
- Years: Team
- –: RK Matulji
- –: RK Zamet

Senior clubs
- Years: Team
- 2007–2011: RK Zamet
- 2011–2013: RK Nexe
- 2013–2015: Alpla HC Hard
- 2015–2016: SG Flensburg-Handewitt
- 2016–2017: Füchse Berlin
- 2017–2024: Frisch Auf Göppingen
- 2024–: RK Nexe Našice
National team
| Years | Team | Apps | (Gls) |
| 2015– | Croatia | 32 | (32) |
Medal record
Youth World Championship
| Gold medal – first place | 2009 Tunisia |
European Championship
| Bronze medal – third place | 2016 Poland |

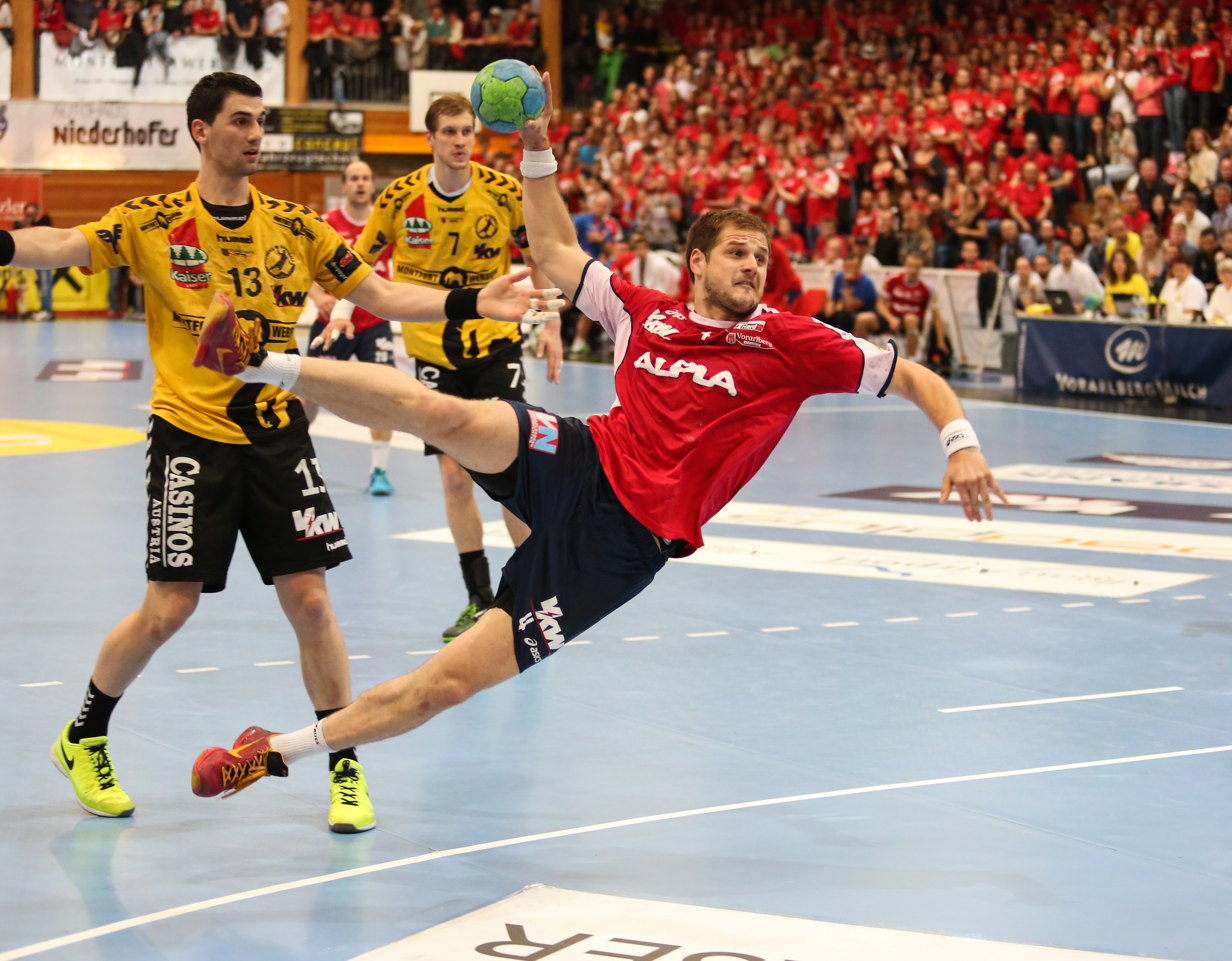
Kresimir Kozina during the second Finale-game of the Handball Liga Austria on 26 May 2015

Krešimir Kozina (born 25 June 1990) is a Croatian handball player for Frisch Auf Göppingen and the Croatian national team.

== Club career ==
Kozina started his youth career in RK Matulji before establishing himself in Zamet the premier handball club of Rijeka.

After four seasons he moved to NEXE. While there he debuted in his first European competition EHF Cup. In 2013 he moved to Austrian Alpla HC Hard. With the club he started winning his first trophies as a club player.

In 2015 Kozina turned down Croatian powerhouse Zagreb and transferred to SG Flensburg-Handewitt where he spent one season.

On 29 May 2016 Kozina signed for Füchse Berlin. On 8 September Kozina won the IHF Super Globe with the club.

On 8 December Kozina announced that he signed with Frisch Auf Göppingen and that he would be moving in the summer of 2017.

Kozina playerd for the Bundesliga Stars team on 2 February 2018 against Germany scoring 4 goals for a win of 43:39.

== International career ==
Kozina started his international career playing for Croatia U-21 at the Youth World Championship where Croatia won the tournament.

He debuted for Croatia 6 November 2015 against Macedonia at a friendly tournament called Croatia Cup.

Kozina competed at the 2016 European Men's Handball Championship where Croatia won third place. Kozina also competed at the 2016 Summer Olympics in Rio de Janeiro. Croatia was eliminated by Poland in the Quarter-finals.

In December 2016 Kozina was invited to national team training for the upcoming 2017 World Championship as a replacement for Marino Marić who was injured. Kozina appeared at the HEP Croatia Cup in their match against Tunisia and scored two goals before being gaining 2 minutes at the end of the match. He didn't appear in the match against Montenegro. Croatia won the HEP Croatia Cup. On 10 January Željko Babić announced the players he would be taking to France, Kozina was not on the list.

== Personal life ==
Kozina has a younger brother Bruno who is also a handball player.

== Honours ==
Zamet

- Croatian Championship U-18
  - Runner-up: 2008

Nexe Našice

- Dukat Premier League
  - Runner-up: 2011–12, 2012–13

Alpla HC Hard

- Austrian Bundesliga
  - Winner: 2013–14, 2014–15
- ÖHB Cup
  - Winner: 2014

Flensburg

- Bundesliga
  - Runner-up: 2015–16
- DHB-Pokal
  - Finalist: 2016

Fusche Berlin

- IHF Super Globe
  - Winner: 2016
- EHF Cup
  - Finalist: 2016–17

Croatia

- Youth World Championship: 2009 – First place
- European Men's Handball Championship: 2016 -Third place
- Summer Olympics: 2016 – Fifth place

Individual

- Dražen Petrović Award – 2009
- Special recognition for achievements in sports by PGŽ: 2009
- Dukat Premier League most average 7m received in 2010–11 -season – 2,00 avg.
- Dukat Premier League most 7m received in 2010–11 -season – 56
- Dukat Premier League best percentage of goals shot from 6m in 2012–13 season – 91,7%
