= Damian Wleklak =

Polish handball player (born 1976)

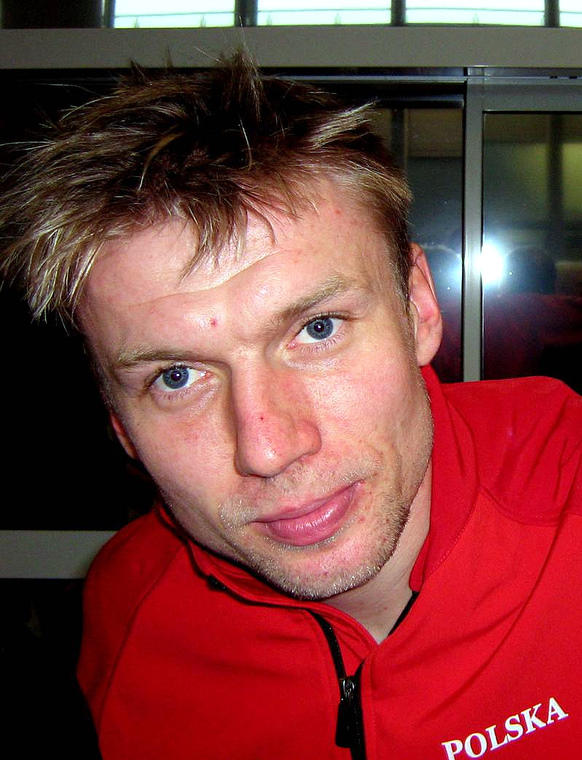

Personal information
- Nationality: Polish
- Born: February 28, 1976 (age 50) Malbork, Poland
- Height: 1.82 m (6 ft 0 in)

Sport
- Sport: Handball
- Position: Centre back

Senior clubs
- Years: Team
- –2001: Wybrzeże Gdańsk
- 2001–2007: Wisła Płock
- 2007–2009: Alpla HC Hard
- 2009–2011: GWD Minden
- 2011–2012: Wybrzeże Gdańsk
National team
| Years | Team | Apps | (Gls) |
| 1998–2009 | Poland | 164 | (273) |

Teams managed
- 2009–2012: Poland (assistant)
- 2011–2017: Wybrzeże Gdańsk
- 2012: Poland
Medal record
World Championship
| Silver medal – second place | 2007 Germany |
| Bronze medal – third place | 2009 Croatia |

Damian Wleklak (born 28 February 1976) is a former Polish handball player.

== Career ==
He was a member of the Polish national team which received a silver medal at the World Championship in 2007 and a bronze in 2009.

=== State awards ===
Golden Cross of Merit in 2007.
