= Dominik Schmid (handballer) =

Austrian handball player (born 1989)

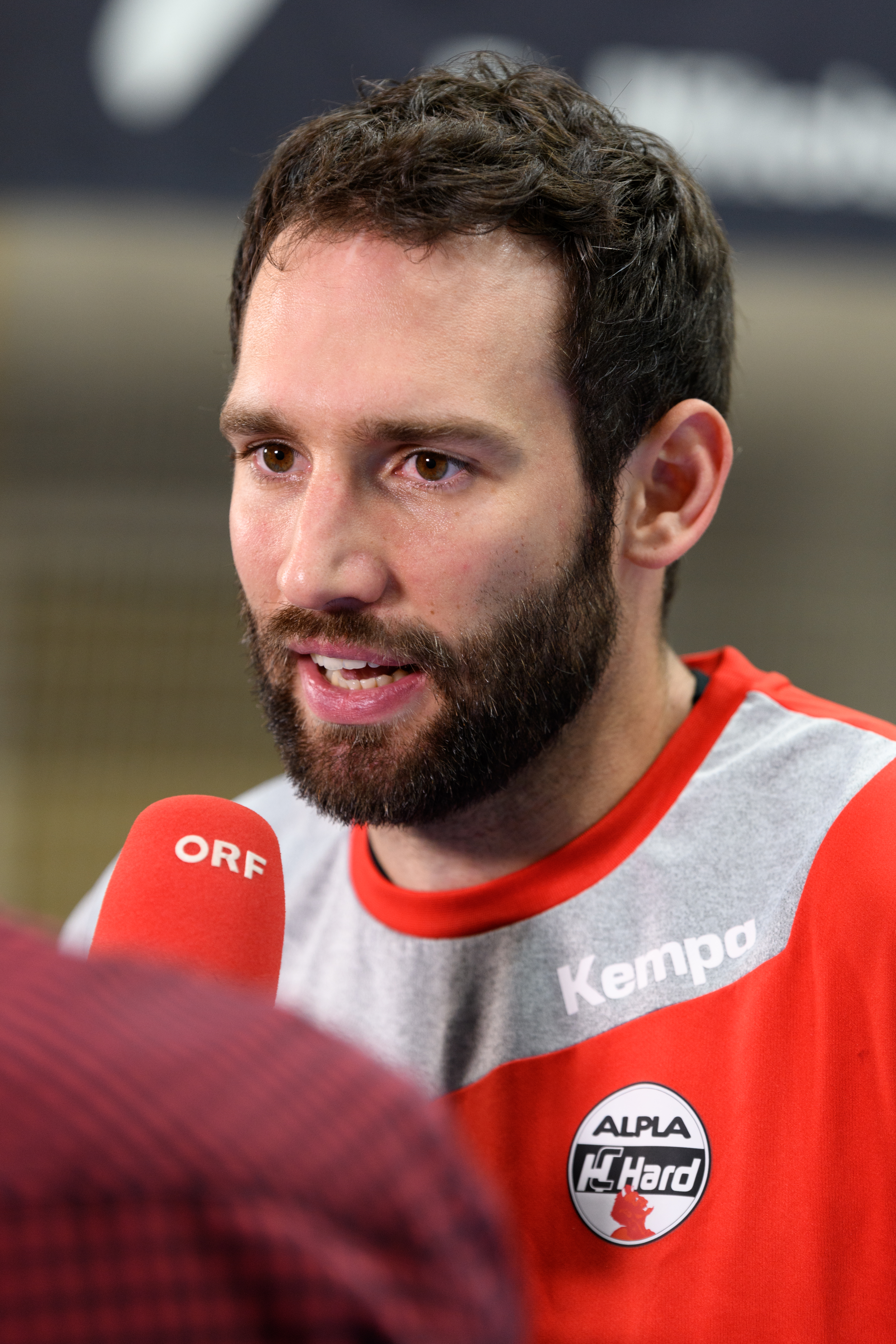

Personal information
- Nationality: Austrian
- Born: 7 September 1989 (age 37) Bregenz, Austria
- Height: 1.93 m (6 ft 4 in)

Sport
- Sport: Handball
- Position: Central back
- Current club: Alpla HC Hard
- Number: 6

Youth career
- Years: Team
- –: Alpla HC Hard

Senior clubs
- Years: Team
- –2014: Alpla HC Hard
- 2014–2015: SG BBM Bietigheim
- 2015–: Alpla HC Hard
National team
Years	Team	Apps	(Gls)
2011–	Austria	57	(74)
- Updated on 27 March 2024

Dominik Schmid (born 7 September 1989) is an Austrian handball player who plays for Alpla HC Hard and the Austrian national team.

His brother Manuel Schmid is also a handball player.
