= Raul Santos =

Austrian handball player (born 1992)

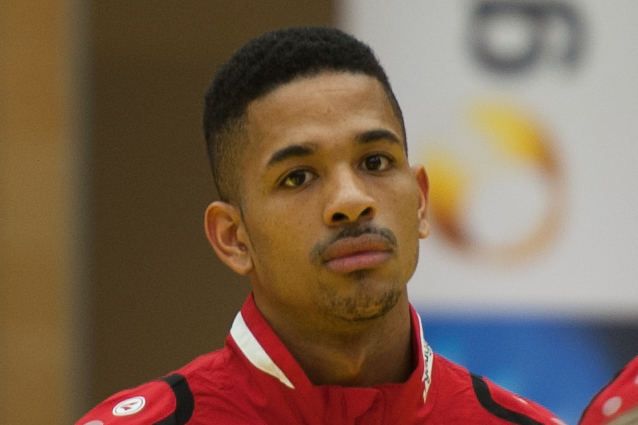

Personal information
- Nationality: Austrian
- Born: 1 June 1992 (age 34) Santo Domingo, Dominican Republic
- Height: 1.80 m (5 ft 11 in)

Sport
- Sport: Handball
- Position: Left wing
- Current club: BT Füchse
- Number: 92

Youth career
- Years: Team
- 2004–2008: Union Leoben

Senior clubs
- Years: Team
- 2008–2013: Union Leoben
- 2013–2016: VfL Gummersbach
- 2016–2018: THW Kiel
- 2018–2020: SC DHfK Leipzig
- 2020–2022: VfL Gummersbach
- 2022–2025: BT Füchse
National team
Years	Team	Apps	(Gls)
2011–2022	Austria	89	(308)
- Updated on 23 August 2022

Raul Santos (born 1 June 1992) is an Austrian handball player for the Austrian club BT Füchse and the Austrian national team.

He debuted for the Austrian national team on April 12th 2011 against Slovakia.

He retired after the 2024–25 season.
