= Gerald Zeiner =

Austrian handball player (born 1988)

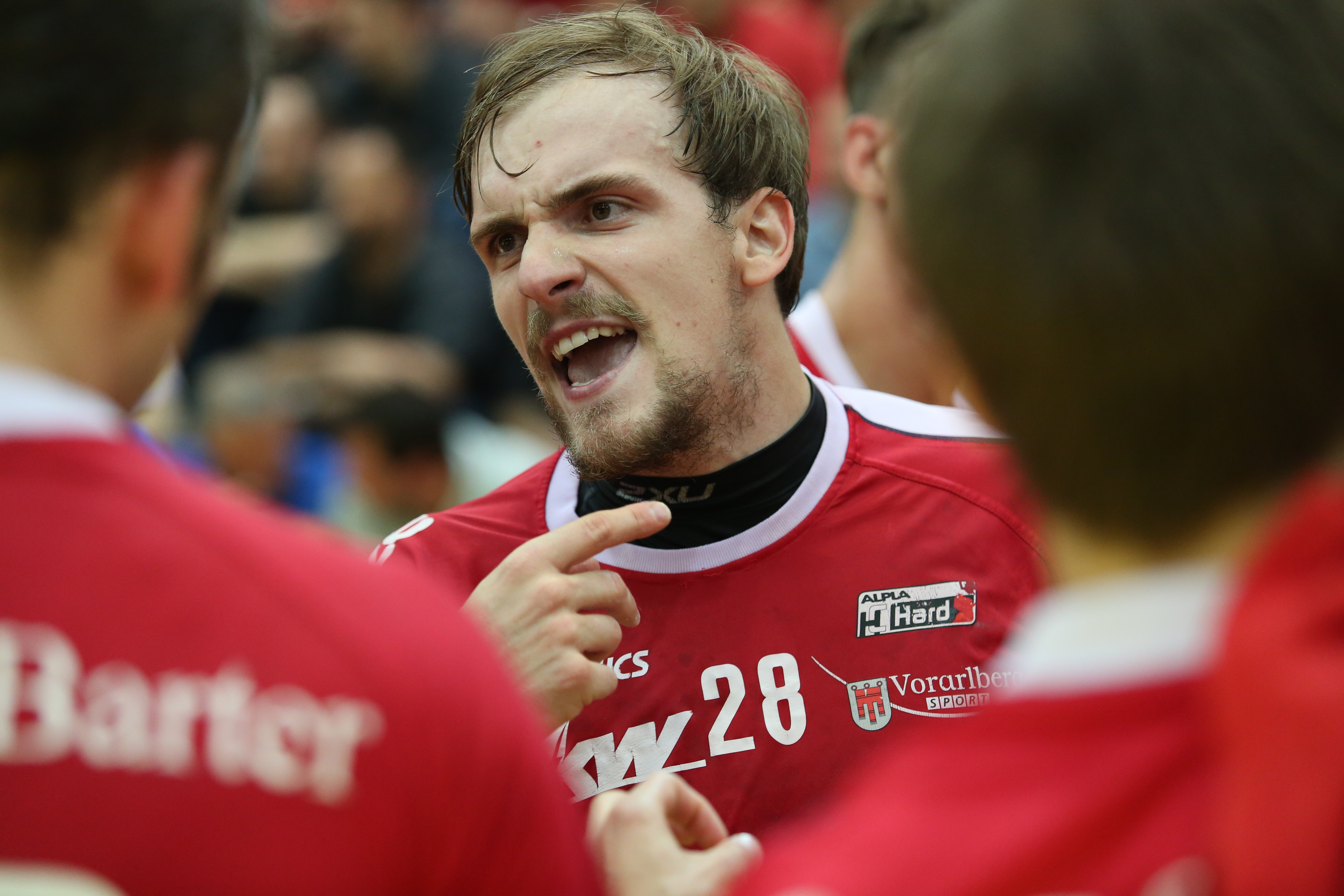

Personal information
- Nationality: Austrian
- Born: 28 June 1988 (age 38) Krems an der Donau, Austria
- Height: 1.90 m (6 ft 3 in)

Sport
- Sport: Handball
- Position: Centre back
- Current club: Retired

Senior clubs
- Years: Team
- –2009: UHK Krems
- 2009–2019: UHC Tulin
- 2010–2013: Union Leoben
- 2013–2020: Alpla HC Hard
- 2020–2022: Handball Tirol
National team
Years	Team	Apps	(Gls)
2015–	Austria	69	(133)

Teams managed
- 2022: Handball Tirol (player-coach)

Gerald Zeiner (born 28 June 1988) is an Austrian handball player for Alpla HC Hard and the Austrian national team.

He participated at the 2018 European Men's Handball Championship and at the 2019 World Men's Handball Championship.

In 2022 he acted as the player-coach for Handball Tirol.
