= HSG Graz =

Austrian handball club

- Full name: HSG Holding Graz
- Founded: 1997; 29 years ago
- Arena: Raiffeisen Sportpark, Graz
- Capacity: 3,000
- Head coach: Risto Arnaudovski
- League: HLA Meisterliga
- Club colours

HSG Graz is a handball club from Graz, Austria. They currently compete in the HLA Meisterliga.

The current name of the club is HSG Holding Graz due to sponsorship reasons.

Location of HSG Graz

== History ==
The club was founded in 1997. They were promoted to the first division for the first time in 2002, but for financial reasons they voluntarily agreed to be relegated to the second division in 2003. In 2017, they finished second in the ÖHB Cup and won the second division, the HLA Challenge League, thus being promoted back to the first division, the HLA Meisterliga.

== Crest, colours, supporters ==
=== Kits ===
AWAY
2017–20	2022–23	2023–24

== Team ==
=== Current squad ===
Squad for the 2025–26 season

HSG Holding Graz

Goalkeepers

- 1 (Austria) Felix Buchgraber
- 12 (Austria) Thomas Eichberger
- 16 (Austria) Maximilian Kolouch

Left Wingers

- 14 (Austria) Markus Höfer
- 15 (Austria) Paul Offner
- 27 (Austria) Martin Ernet

Right Wingers

- 13 (Austria) Theodor Schweighofer
- 19 (Austria) Paul Rosenberger
- 20 (Austria) Thomas Scherr

Line Players

- 10 (Austria) Maximilian Kelich
- 29 (Austria) Lukas Schweighofer
- 31 (Austria) Julian Schöpf

Left Backs

- 23 (Austria) (Serbia) Nemanja Beloš
- 35 (Croatia) Jura Egon Juranić
- 93 (North Macedonia) Borjan Damjanoski

Central Backs

- 6 (Austria) Jakob Rosenberger
- 30 (Austria) Kilian Schranz
- 32 (Slovenia) Matic Kotar
- 33 (Austria) Leonhard Schweighofer

Right Backs

- 7 (Slovenia) Matej Galina
- 24 (Austria) Florian Schimmel
- 25 (Austria) Simon Sonnleitner
- 77 (Slovenia) Jurij Jensterle

=== Technical staff ===
- Head coach: (Greece) Spyros Balomenos
- Assistant coach: (Bosnia and Herzegovina) Goran Pajičić
- Goalkeeping coach: (Bosnia and Herzegovina) Amel Kocic
- Coach: (Austria) Anna Fötsch-Schweighofer

=== Transfers ===
Transfers for the 2026–27 season

Joining

- (Austria) Martin Breg (RW) from (Austria) BT Füchse

Leaving

- (Slovenia) Matej Galina (RB) to (Austria) SC Ferlach
- (North Macedonia) Borjan Damjanoski (LB) to (Austria) BT Füchse
- (Austria) Maximilian Kelich (LP) to (Austria) BT Füchse
- (Austria) Jakob Rosenberger (CB) to (Austria) HIB Handball Graz
- (Austria) Theodor Schweighofer (RW) (retires)
- (Austria) Florian Schimmel (RB) (retires)

=== Transfer History ===
Transfers for the 2025–26 season

Joining

- (Slovenia) Matic Kotar (CB) from (Austria) Bregenz Handball
- (Croatia) Jura Egon Juranić (LB) from (Austria) SC Ferlach
- (Austria) Maximilian Kelich (LP) from (Austria) HIB Handball Graz
- (Austria) Jakob Rosenberger (CB) from (Austria) HIB Handball Graz
- (Austria) Paul Rosenberger (RW) from (Austria) HIB Handball Graz
- (Austria) Simon Sonnleitner (RB) from (Austria) HIB Handball Graz

Leaving

- (Bosnia and Herzegovina) Jovo Budović (GK) to (Austria) HSG Bärnbach/Köflach
- (Austria) Ramon Raschid (LP) (retires)
- (Austria) (Hungary) József Albek (LB) to (Greece) Athinaikos H.C.

Transfers for the 2024–25 season

Joining

- (Austria) (Serbia) Nemanja Beloš (LB) back from loan at (Qatar) Al Arabi SC

Leaving

- (Austria) (Serbia) Nemanja Beloš (LB) on loan at (Qatar) Al Arabi SC

== Accomplishments ==
- Austrian Cup (ÖHB-Cup)
  - Silver: 2017

== Former club members ==
=== Notable former players ===
The list includes players who have played at least once for their national team or spent at least 10 years with the team.

==== Goalkeepers ====
- (Austria) Leon Bergmann (2020–2023)
- (Austria) Thomas Eichberger (2011–2020, 2024–)

==== Line players ====
- (Austria) Lukas Schweighofer (2003–2018, 2023–)

==== Left backs ====
- (Austria) (Hungary) József Albek (2017–2025)
- (Austria) (Serbia) Nemanja Beloš (2017–)
- (Austria) Daniel Dicker (2011–2013, 2018–2020)
- (Slovenia) Aleš Pajovič (2015–2018)

==== Right backs ====
- (Bosnia and Herzegovina) Srđan Predragović (2023–2024)
