= Aleš Pajovič =

Slovenian handball player

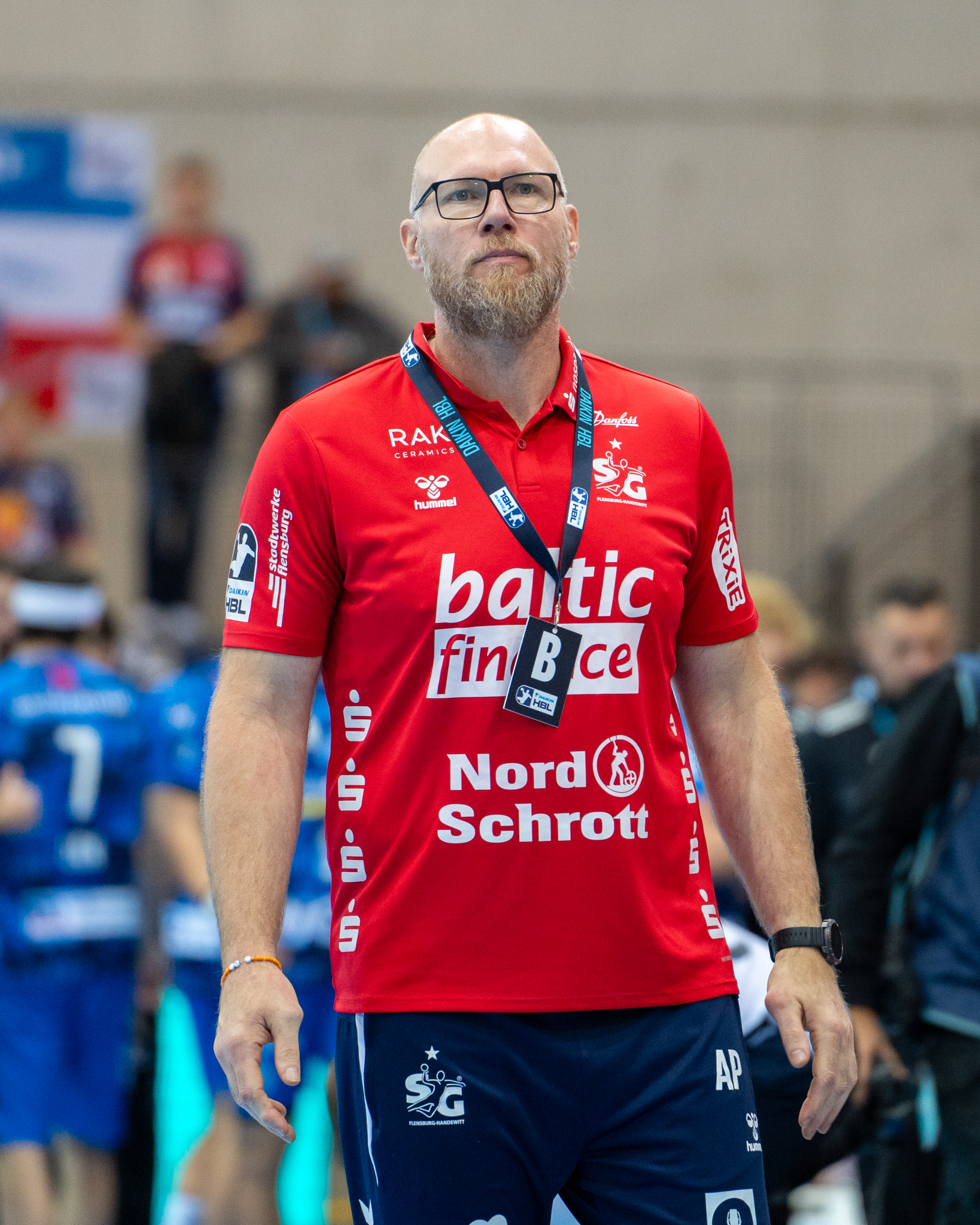

Personal information
- Nationality: Slovenian
- Born: 6 January 1979 (age 47) Celje, Slovenia, Yugoslavia
- Height: 1.97 m (6 ft 6 in)

Sport
- Sport: Handball
- Position: Left back

Senior clubs
- Years: Team
- -2003: RK Celje
- 2003-2009: BM Ciudad Real
- 2007: → THW Kiel
- 2009-2011: RK Celje
- 2011: → HC Shoppingcity Seiersberg
- 2011-2013: SC Magdeburg
- 2013-2015: TuS N-Lübbecke
- 2015-2018: HSG Graz
National team
Years	Team	Apps	(Gls)
–	Slovenia	181	(697)

Teams managed
- 2015–2019: HSG Graz
- 2019–: Austria
- 2025–: SG Flensburg-Handewitt

Aleš Pajovič (born 6 January 1979) is a Slovenian retired handball player and current coach of the Austrian national team.

== Playing career ==
Pajovič started playing handball at his hometown club RK Celje. He played his first senior game in 1997. With Celje he won the domestic league every year from 1998 to 2003, as well as the Slovenian cup from 1998 to 2001. In 2003, he joined Spanish side BM Ciudad Real. During that first season with Real, he won the 2003-04 Liga ASOBAL and Copa ASOBAL In 2004-05, he won the Spanish cup for the second time, and for the third time in 2005-06. That season, he also won the EHF Champions League for the first time.

In the 2006-07 season, Ciudad Real had issues with registration of players (it had more foreign players than league rules allowed, and Pajovič was forced out to sit out the whole season. He stayed with the club hoped either Arpad Šterbik or Siarhei Rutenka would obtain Spanish citizenship.

In October 2007, he joined German champions THW Kiel on loan until the end of the year. He then returned to Real where he won the treble in season 2007-08 (Spanish league, Spanish cup, and EHF Champions League), and a double in season 2008-09 (Spanish league and EHF Champions League).

In 2009, he returned to RK Celje. In 2011, he joined Austrian side HC Shoppingcity Seiersberg on loan to help them get promoted to the top Austrian League. After that short stint, he joined German side SC Magdeburg. Halfway through the 2012-13 season, he joined league rivals TuS N-Lübbecke.

In 2015, he joined Austrian HSG Graz, where he became a player-coach during the 2017-18 season.

He retired after the 2018-19 season and became a coach at the club.

== National team ==
Aleš Pajovič played 181 games for Slovenia.

At the 2004 European Championship, he was deemed one of the crucial players who helped Slovenia secure the silver medal.

He competed at the 2000 Summer Olympics and the 2004 Summer Olympics.

== Coaching career ==
In March 2019, he became the head coach of the Austrian national team and under his command the team played at four European Championships (in 2020, 2022, 2024, and 2026), as well as three World Championships (in 2019, 2021, and 2025).
