= Thomas Eichberger =

Austrian handball player (born 1993)

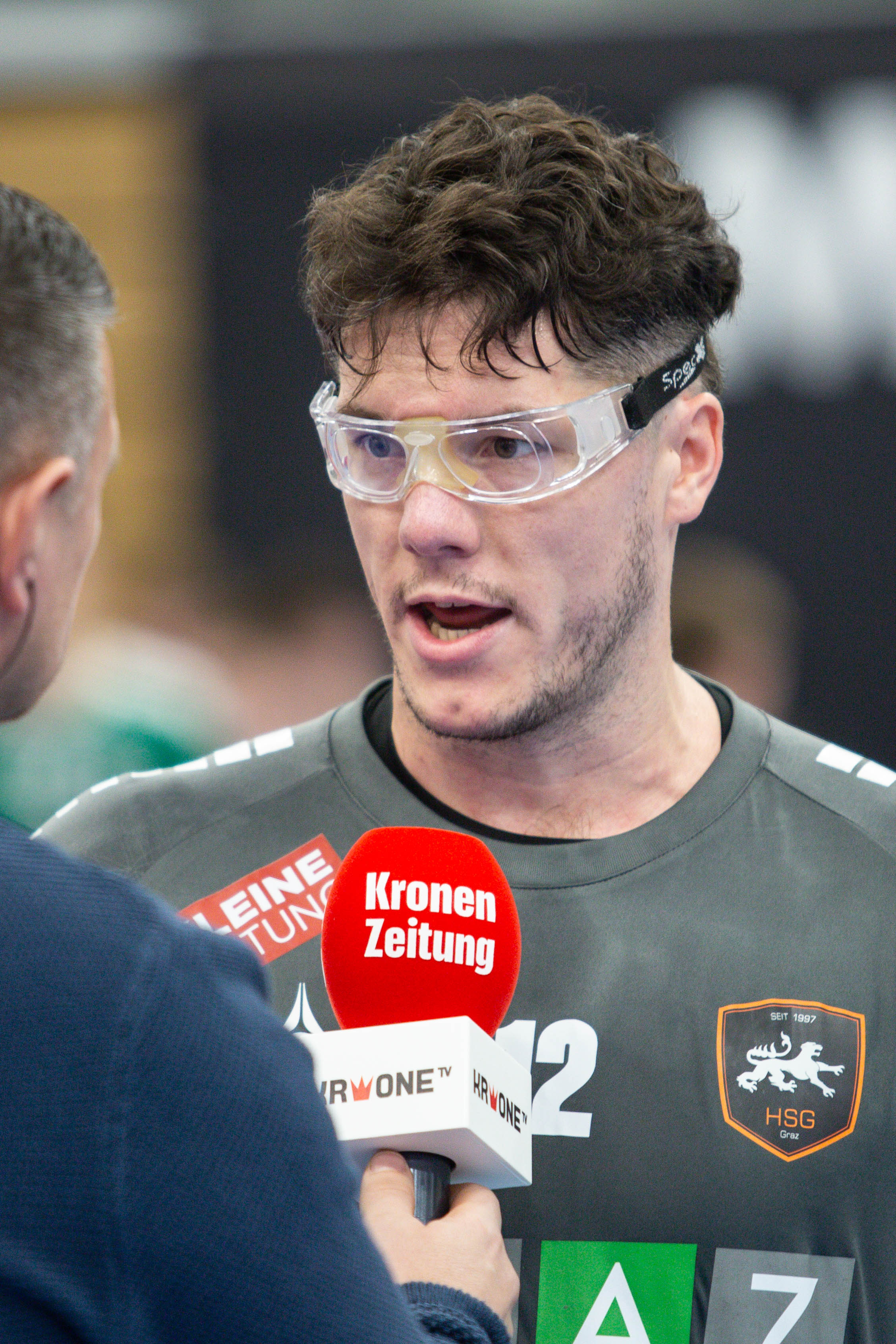
- Eichberger (2026)

Personal information
- Nationality: Austrian
- Born: 20 August 1993 (age 33) Judenburg, Austria
- Height: 1.95 m (6 ft 5 in)

Sport
- Sport: Handball
- Position: Goalkeeper
- Current club: HSG Graz
- Number: 12

Youth career
- Years: Team
- –: HIB Graz

Senior clubs
- Years: Team
- 2010-2011: ATV Trofaiach
- 2011-2020: HSG Graz
- 2020-2022: ThSV Eisenach
- 2022-2024: UHK Krems
- 2024-: HSG Graz
National team
Years	Team	Apps	(Gls)
2018-	Austria	32	(2)
- Updated on 31 December 2025

Thomas Eichberger (born 20 August 1993) is an Austrian handball player for HSG Graz and the Austrian national team.

He represented Austria at the 2020 European Men's Handball Championship.
