= Aliaksei Kishou =

Belarusian handball player

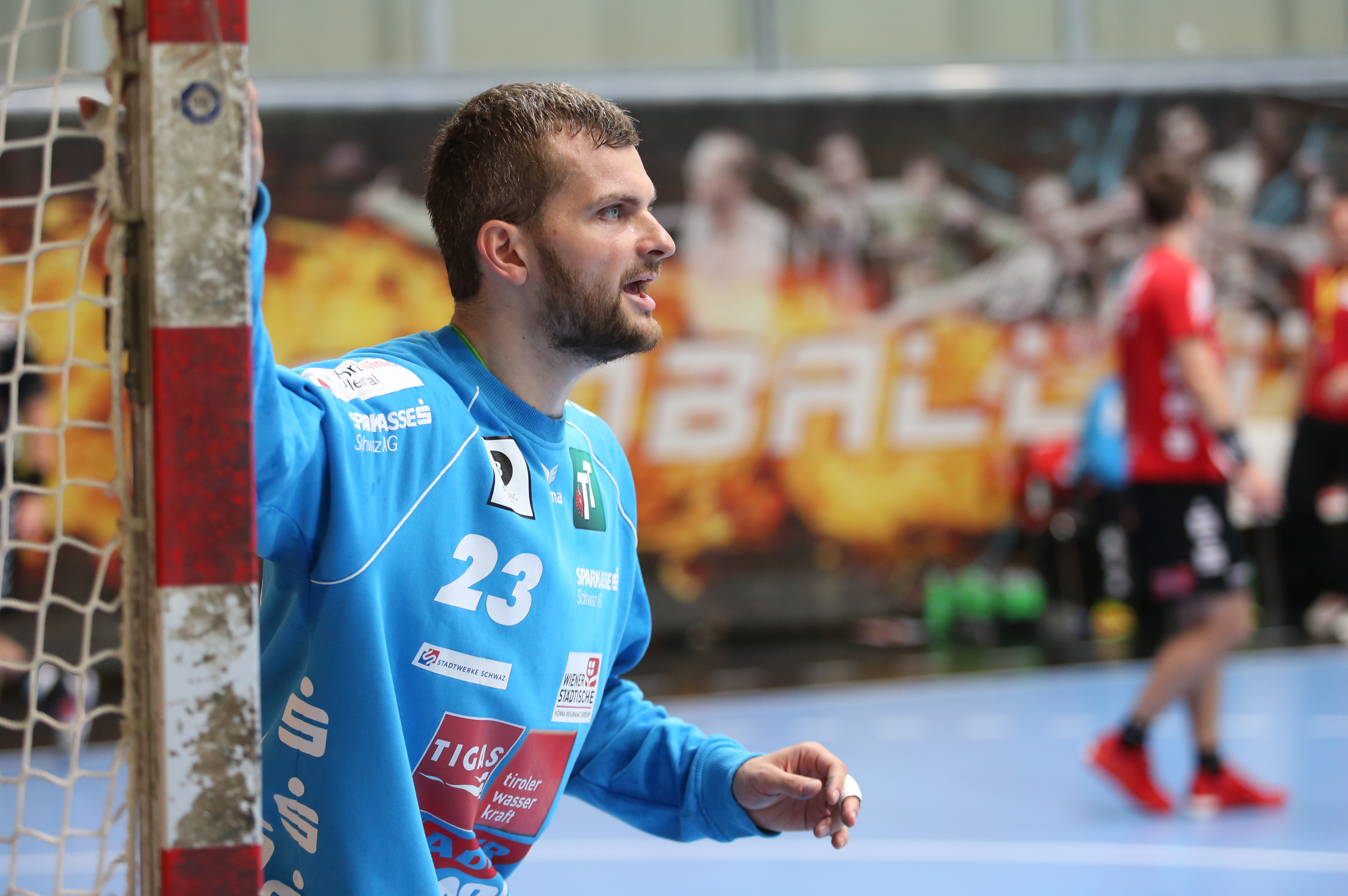

Personal information
- Nationality: Belarusian
- Born: 23 September 1986 (age 40) Slutsk, Belarus
- Height: 1.94 m (6 ft 4 in)

Sport
- Sport: Handball
- Position: Goalkeeper
- Current club: SKA Minsk
- Number: 23
National team
Years	Team	Apps	(Gls)
–	Belarus	48	(0)

Aliaksei Kishou (born 23 September 1986) is a Belarusian handball player for SKA Minsk and the Belarusian national team.
