= Pepi Manaskov =

Macedonian handball player

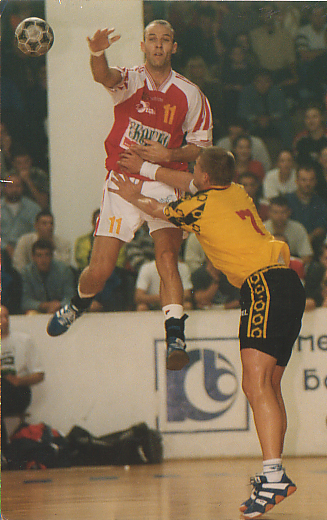

Personal information
- Full name: Pepi Manaskov
- Nationality: Macedonian
- Born: 19 August 1964 (age 62) Titov Veles, Yugoslavia
- Height: 1.97 m (6 ft 5 1/2 in)

Sport
- Sport: Handball
- Position: Left Back

Senior clubs
- Years: Team
- 1983–1990: Pelister
- 1991–1993: Créteil
- 1993–1997: VFL Hameln
- 1997–1998: Pelister
- 1998–2000: Celje
- 2000–2002: RK Vardar PRO
- 2002–2003: HC Fillipos Verias
- 2003–2004: Borec Mladost
- 2004–2005: RK Pelister
National team
Years	Team	Apps	(Gls)
1991–2006	Macedonia	84	(264)

Teams managed
- 2011–2012: RK Kumanovo
- 2013–2019: RK Vardar Junior
- 2020–2021: HC Rabotnichki

Pepi Manaskov (Macedonian: Пепи Манасков; born 19 August 1964) is a former Macedonian handball player and current coach of Vardar Junior.

His sons Dejan and Martin are handball players.

In November 2011, he became the head coach of RK Kumanovo.

== Clubs ==
- RK Pelister (1986-1993)
- US Créteil (1991-1993)
- VFL Hameln (1993–1997)
- RK Pelister (1997–1998)
- Celje Pivovarna Lasko (1998–2000)
- RK Vardar PRO (2000–2002)
- HC Fillipos Verias (2002–2003)
- RK Vardar PRO (2003–2004)
- RK Pelister (2004–2005)
- RK Vardar PRO (2005–2006)

== Honours & Achievements ==
As player:

- RK Pelister
  - Macedonian Handball Championship:
    - Winner: 1997/98, 2004/05
  - Macedonian Handball Cup:
    - Winner: 1997/98, 2004/05
  - Doboj International Handball Tournament:
    - Winner: 1996/97
- RK Celje Pivovarna Lasko
  - Slovenian Championships:
    - Winner: 1997/98, 1998/99, 1999/00
  - Slovenian Cup:
    - Winner: 1997/98, 1998/99, 1999/00
- RK Vardar PRO
  - Macedonian Handball Championship:
    - Winner: 2000/01, 2001/02, 2003/04
  - Macedonian Handball Cup:
    - Winner: 2000/01, 2003/04
- AC Filippos Verias
  - Greek Handball League:
    - Winner: 2002/03
  - Greek Handball Cup:
    - Winner: 2002/03
