= Frederic Wüstner =

Austrian handball player (born 1992)

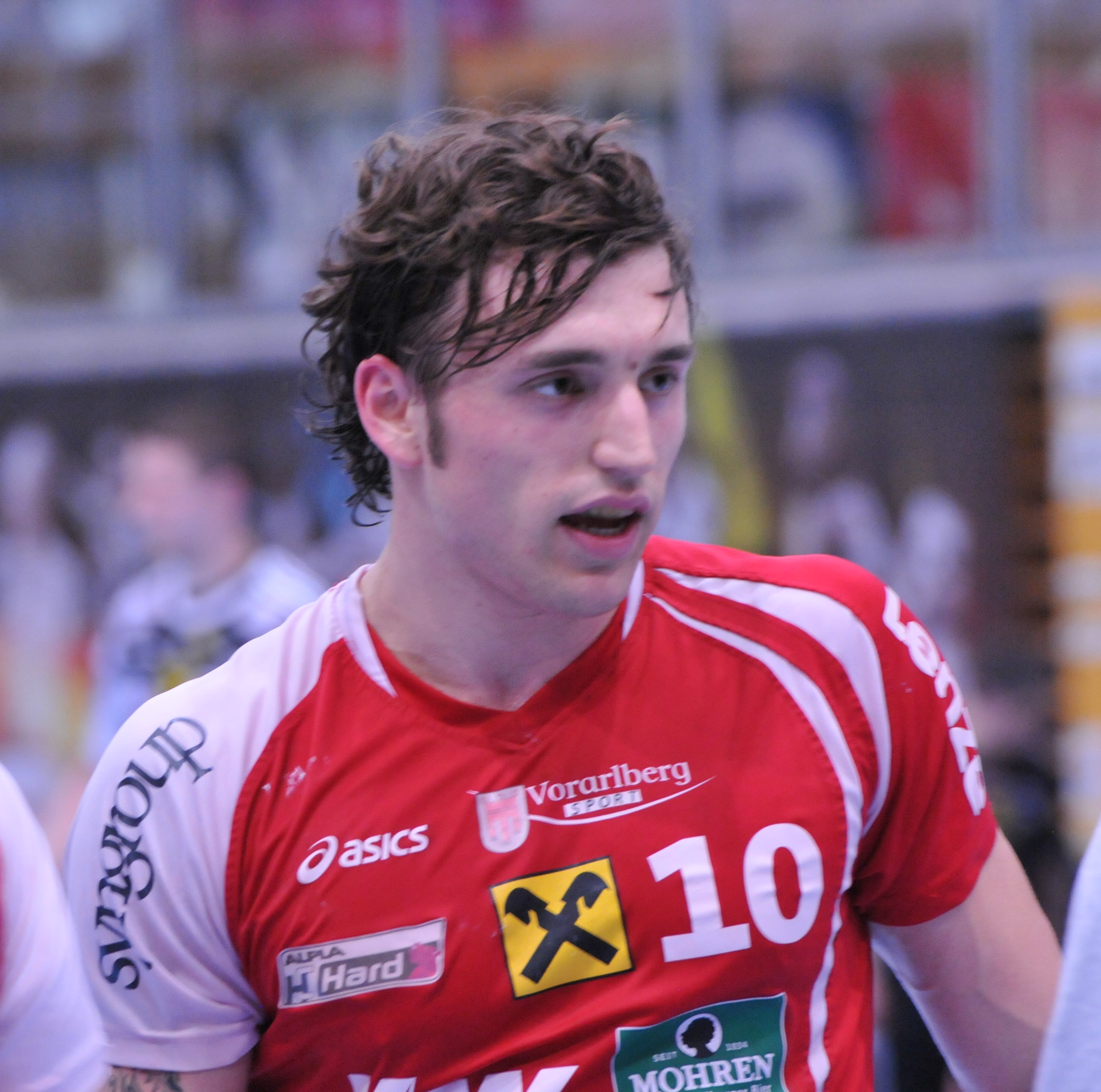

Personal information
- Nationality: Austrian
- Born: 7 September 1992 (age 34) Bregenz, Austria
- Height: 1.91 m (6 ft 3 in)

Sport
- Sport: Handball
- Position: Left back
- Current club: TSV St. Otmar St. Gallen
- Number: 10
National team
Years	Team	Apps	(Gls)
2018–	Austria	13	(0)

Frederic Wüstner (born 7 September 1992) is an Austrian handball player for TSV St. Otmar St. Gallen and the Austrian national team.

He represented Austria at the 2019 World Men's Handball Championship.
