= Thomas Kandolf =

Austrian handball player (born 1993)

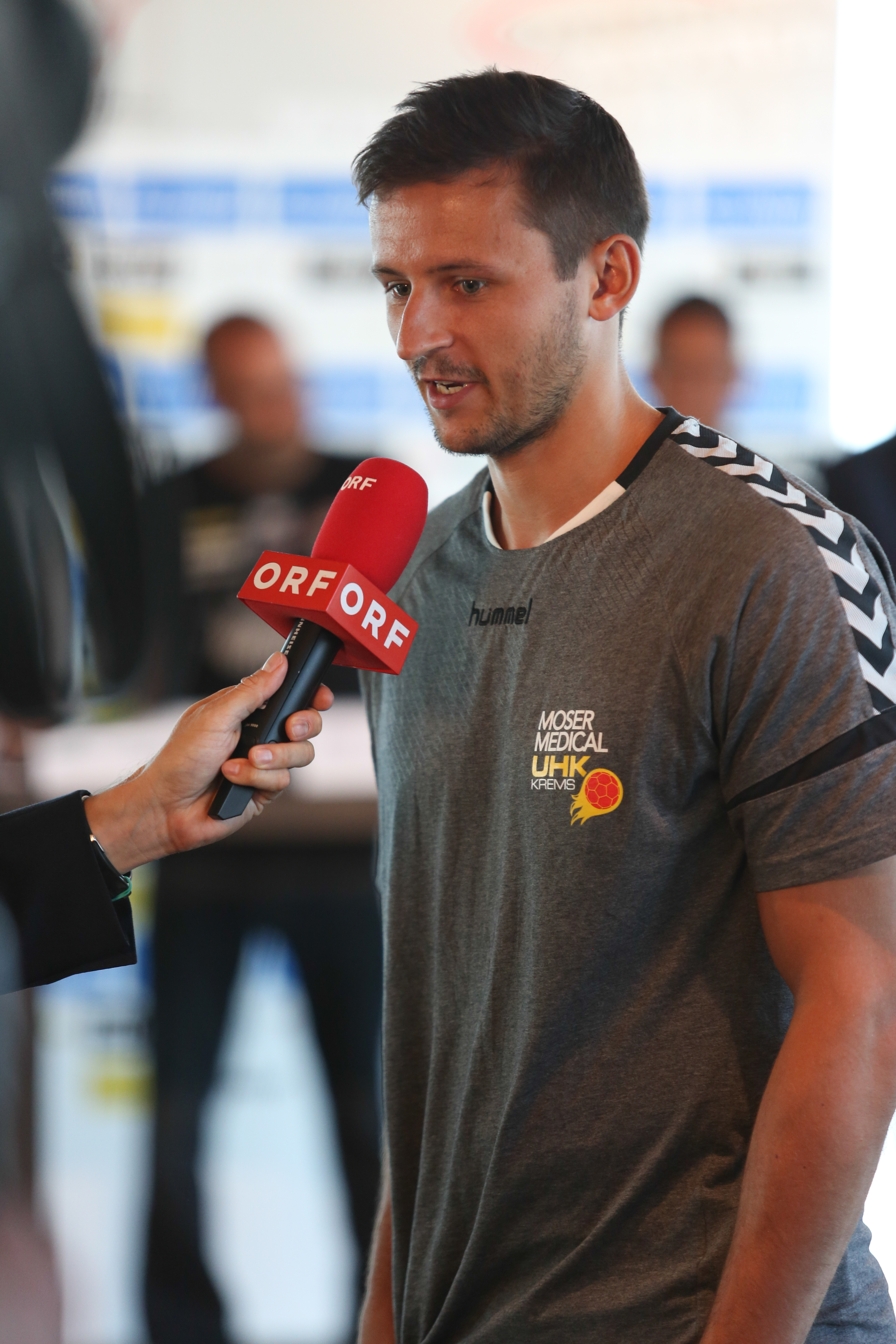

Personal information
- Nationality: Austrian
- Born: 1 December 1993 (age 32) Innsbruck, Austria
- Height: 1.83 m (6 ft 0 in)

Sport
- Sport: Handball
- Position: Right back
- Current club: Handball Tirol
- Number: 3
National team
Years	Team	Apps	(Gls)
–	Austria	13	(14)

Thomas Kandolf (born 1 December 1993) is an Austrian handball player for Handball Tirol and the Austrian national team.

He participated at the 2018 European Men's Handball Championship.
