= Srđan Predragović =

Bosnian handball player (born 1995)

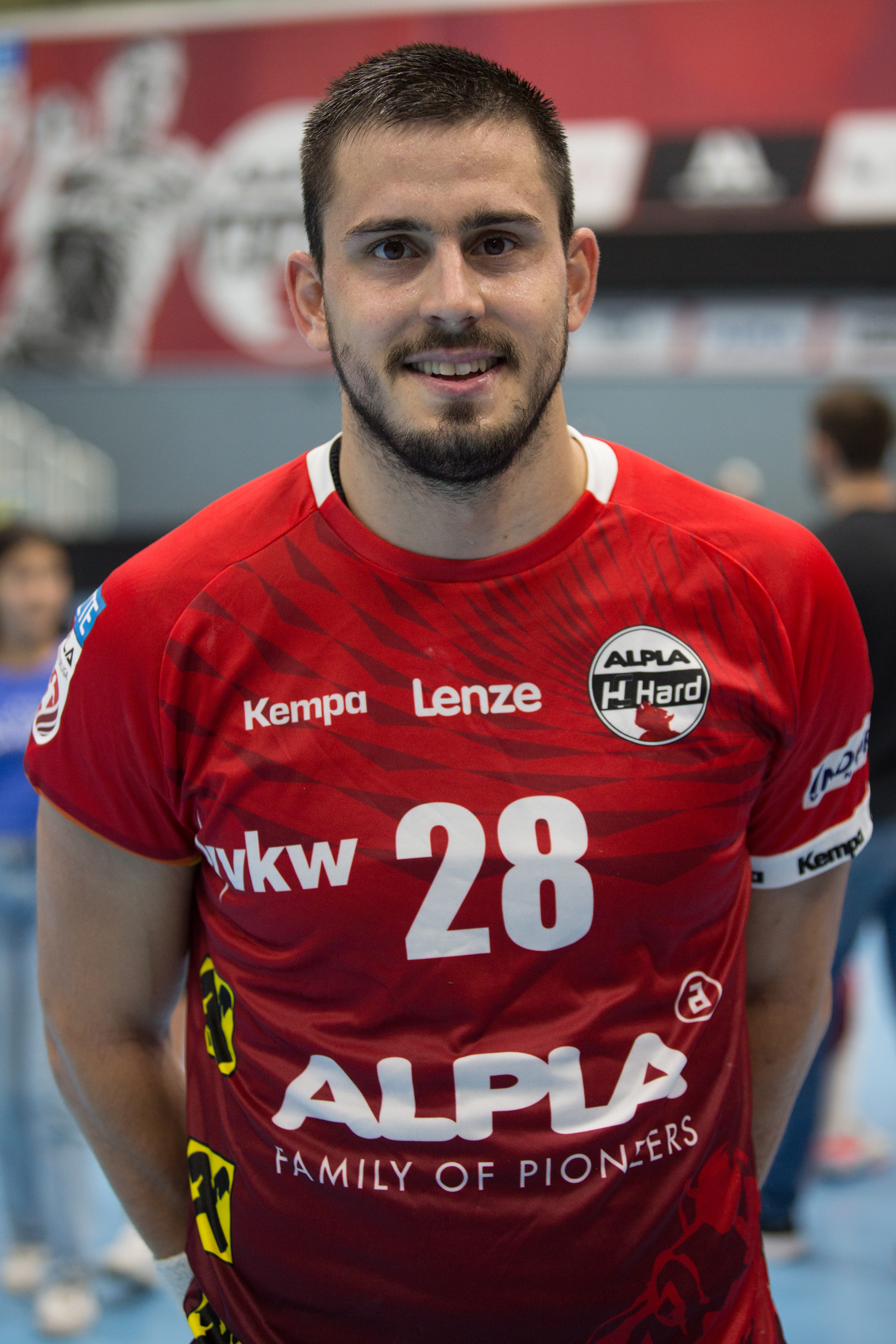

Personal information
- Born: 4 July 1995 (age 31) Banja Luka, Bosnia and Herzegovina
- Height: 1.93 m (6 ft 4 in)

Sport
- Sport: Handball
- Position: Right wing/back
- Current club: Alpla HC Hard
National team
Years	Team	Apps	(Gls)
–	Bosnia and Herzegovina	13	(22)

Srđan Predragović (born 4 July 1995) is a Bosnian handball player for Alpla HC Hard and the Bosnian national team.

He represented Bosnia and Herzegovina at the 2020 European Men's Handball Championship.
