= Kristof Vizvary =

Austrian handball player (born 1983)

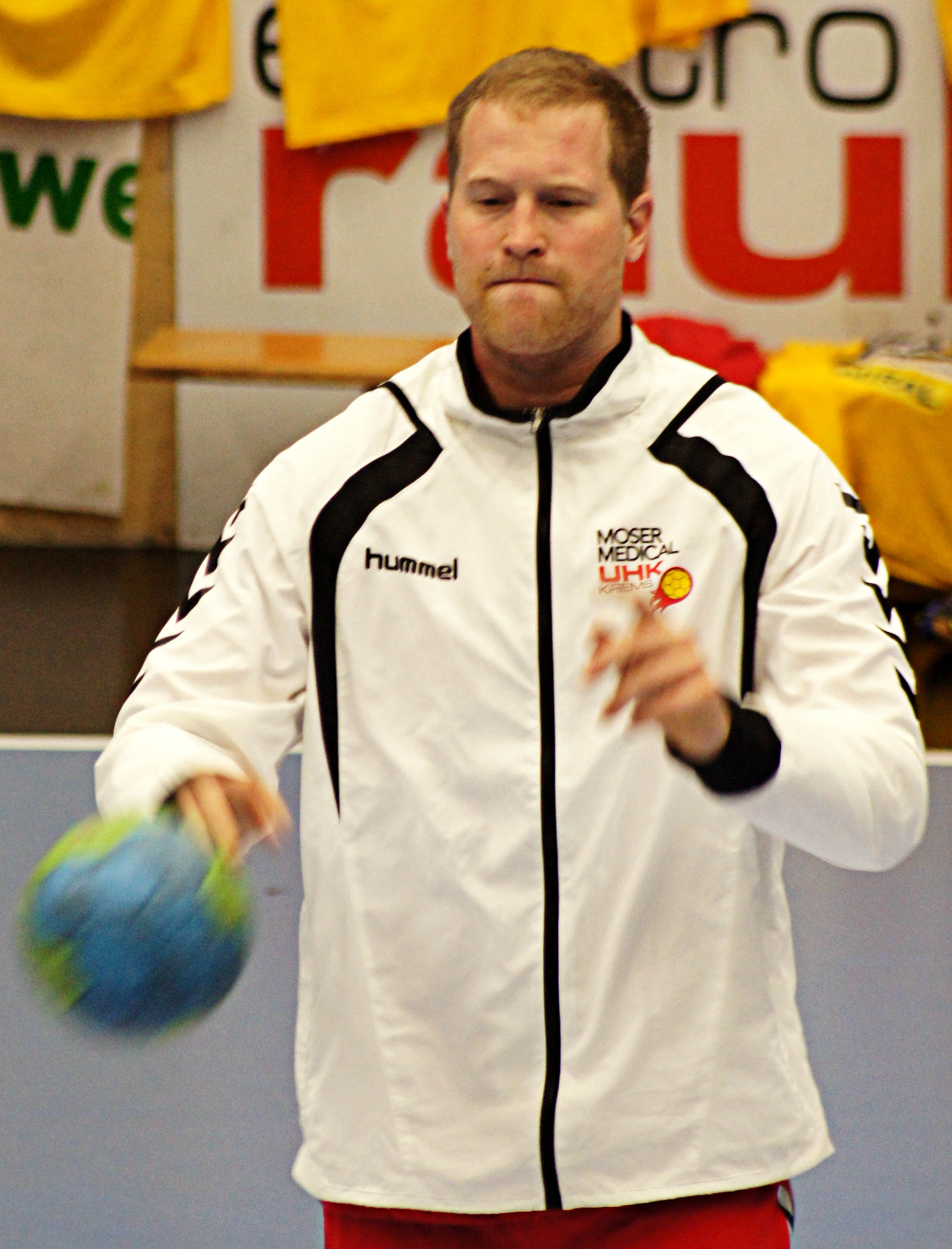
Kristof Vizvary

Kristof Vizvary (born 21 August 1983 in Lower Austria) is a professional handball player. Kristof first played for UHC Tulln and now plays for UHK Krems. He is 198 cm (6 ft 6 in) tall and weighs 105 kg (231 lb).
