= Dejan Manaskov =

Macedonian handball player

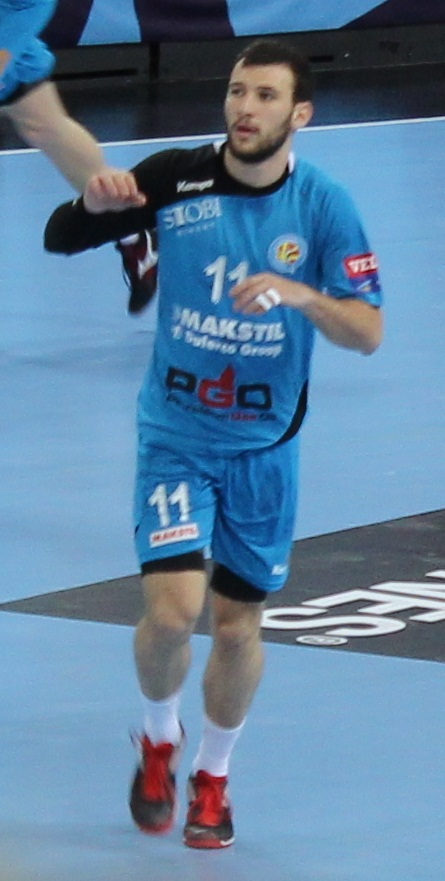

Personal information
- Nationality: Macedonian
- Born: 26 August 1992 (age 34) Créteil, France
- Height: 1.81 m (5 ft 11 in)

Sport
- Sport: Handball
- Position: Left wing
- Current club: RK Eurofarm Pelister
- Number: 11

Youth career
- Years: Team
- 2002–2008: RK Borec

Senior clubs
- Years: Team
- 2008–02/2015: RK Metalurg Skopje
- 2015: HSG Wetzlar
- 2015–2016: RK Vardar
- 2016–2017: Rhein-Neckar Löwen
- 2017–2022: Telekom Veszprém
- 2022–2023: RK Vardar 1961
- 01/2024–2026: RK Eurofarm Pelister
National team
Years	Team	Apps	(Gls)
2012–	Macedonia	72	(279)

Dejan Manaskov (Macedonian: Дејан Манасков; born 26 August 1992) is a Macedonian handball player for RK Eurofarm Pelister.

He is the older son of Pepi Manaskov. His brother, Martin Manaskov, is also a handball player.

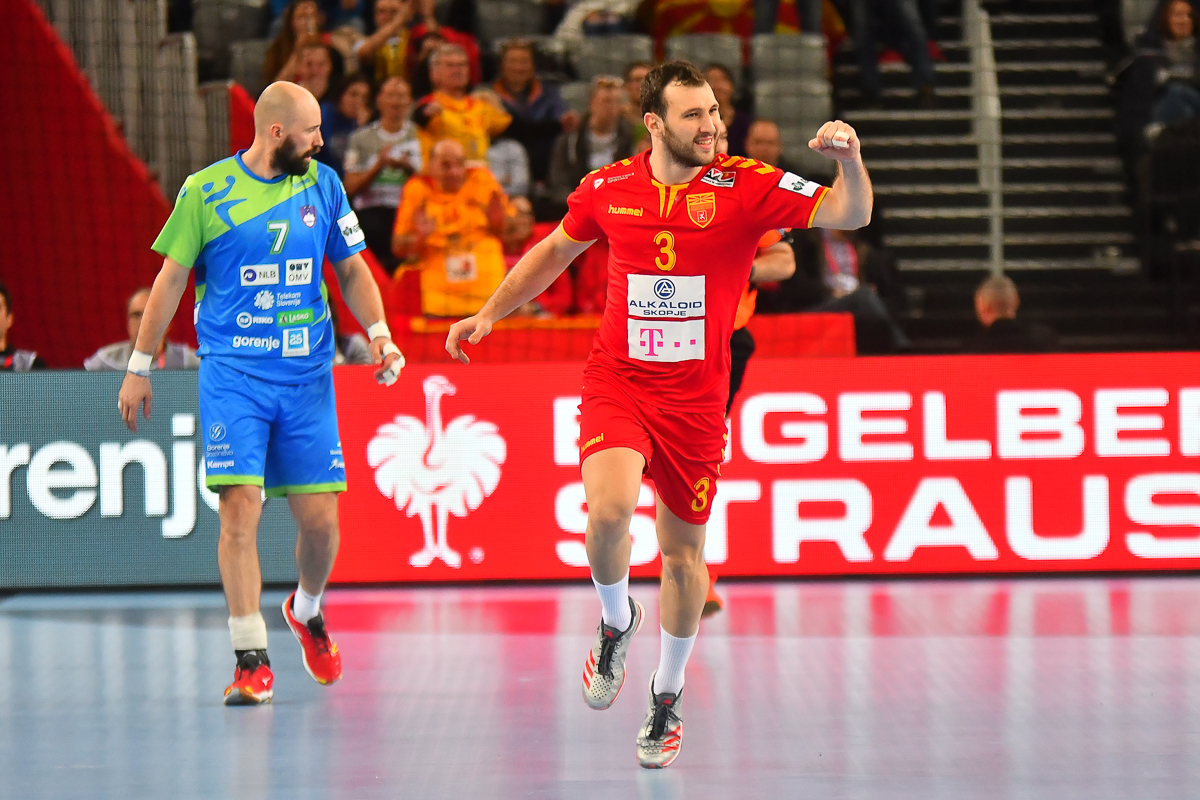
Dejan Manaskov (2018) National team

With Metalurg he won the championship and the cup 4 times. After Metalurg he moved to HSG Wetzlar. He had a great season with Wetzlar. So next season RK Vardar he brought the winger sniper in its superstar team. He had a great season in Vardar winning both the cup and the championship With German Rhein-Necker,he immediately showed interest in bringing the winger sniper in Germany. After winning the German Bundesliga in his first season European Heavyweight Veszprem decided to bring him at his team. Having many successful years with Veszprem in the season 2022 he returned to Skopje and signed with RK Vardar again.

== Honours ==
- RK Metalurg
- Macedonian Handball Super League

Winner: (2009–10, 2010–11, 2011–12 ,2013–14)

- Macedonian Cup

Winner: (2009, 2010, 2011, 2013)

- RK Vardar
- Macedonian Handball Super League

Winner: (2015–16)

- Macedonian Cup

Winner:(2015-16, 2022-23)

- Rhein-Neckar Löwen
  - German League: 2017
- Veszprem
  - Hungarian league : 2018–19
  - Hungarian Cup: 2018, 2021, 2022
- RK Eurofarm Pelister
- Macedonian Handball Super League

Winner: (2023–24, 2024–25)
