= Martin Manaskov =

Macedonian handball player

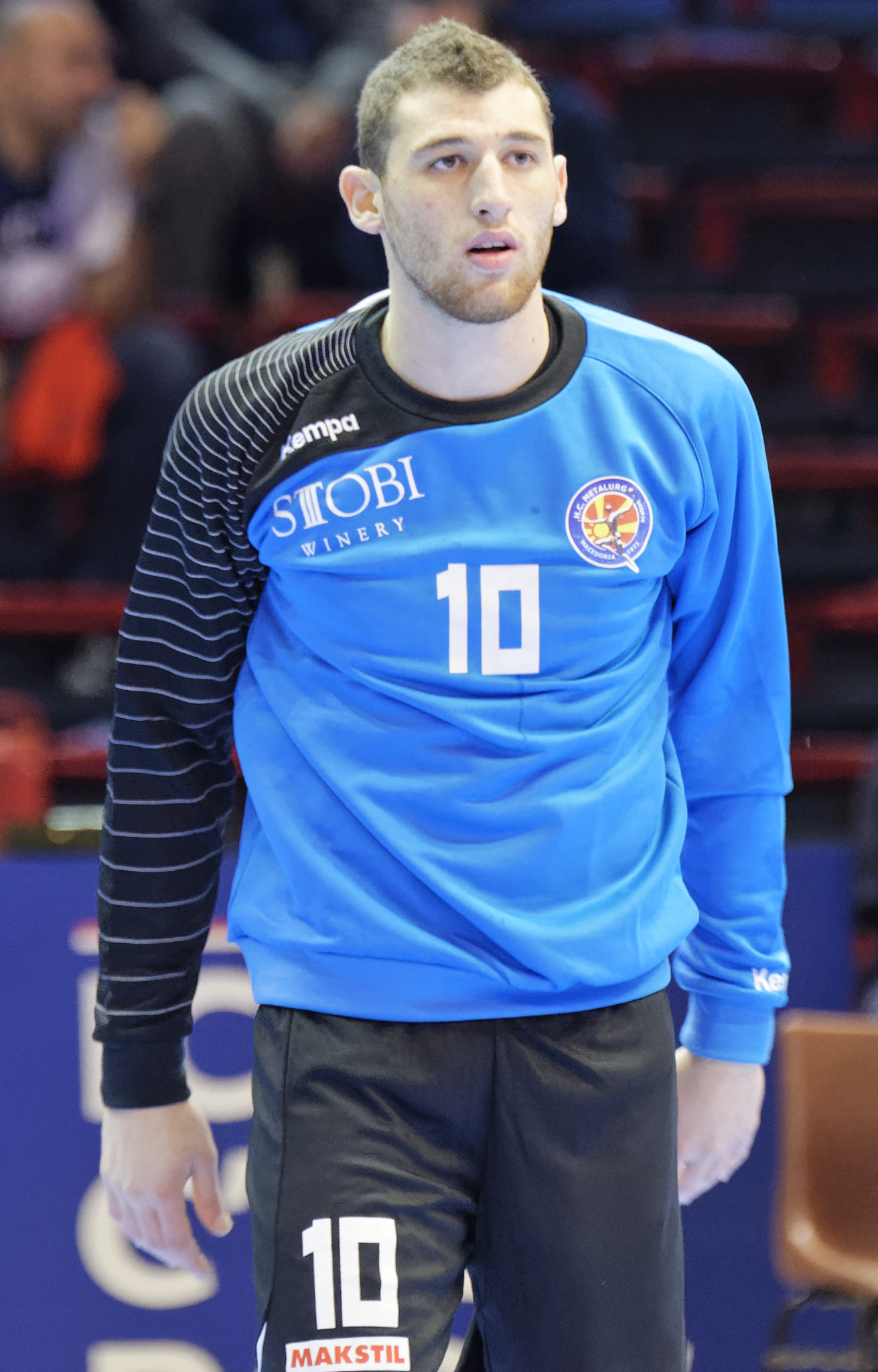

Personal information
- Nationality: Macedonian
- Born: 7 June 1994 (age 32) Titov Veles, Macedonia
- Height: 1.92 m (6 ft 4 in)

Sport
- Sport: Handball
- Position: Centre Back
- Current club: Alpla HC Hard
- Number: 24

Senior clubs
- Years: Team
- 2015: (North Macedonia) RK Metalurg Skopje
- 2015–2017: (North Macedonia) RK Vardar Junior
- 2017–2019: (North Macedonia) RK Tineks Prolet
- 2019–2022: (North Macedonia) GRK Ohrid
- 2022–2023: (North Macedonia) HC Butel Skopje
- 2023–12/2025: (North Macedonia) GRK Tikveš
- 03/2026–: (Austria) Alpla HC Hard
National team
- Years: Team
- 2013–: Macedonia

Martin Manaskov (born 7 June 1994) is a Macedonian handball player who plays for Alpla HC Hard.

His brother Dejan Manaskov is also a handball player and his father Pepi Manaskov is a former handball player.
