= Matúš Vizváry =

Slovak ice hockey player

- Born: March 15, 1989 (age 36); Bratislava, Czechoslovakia
- Height: 6 ft 1 in (185 cm)
- Weight: 185 lb (84 kg; 13 st 3 lb)
- Position: left defender
- Shoots: left
- Mestis team Former teams: Hokki Kajaanin; HK Ruzinov 99 Bratislava; HC Banska Bystrica; Yunost Minsk; HK Dukla Trencin; Raahe-Kiekko
- Playing career: HK Ruzinov 99 Bratislava–present

Matúš Vizváry (born March 15, 1989) is a Slovak professional ice hockey player who played with Kajaanin Hokki in the second-highest league Mestis on Finland .
