= Spyros Balomenos =

Greek handball player (born 1979)

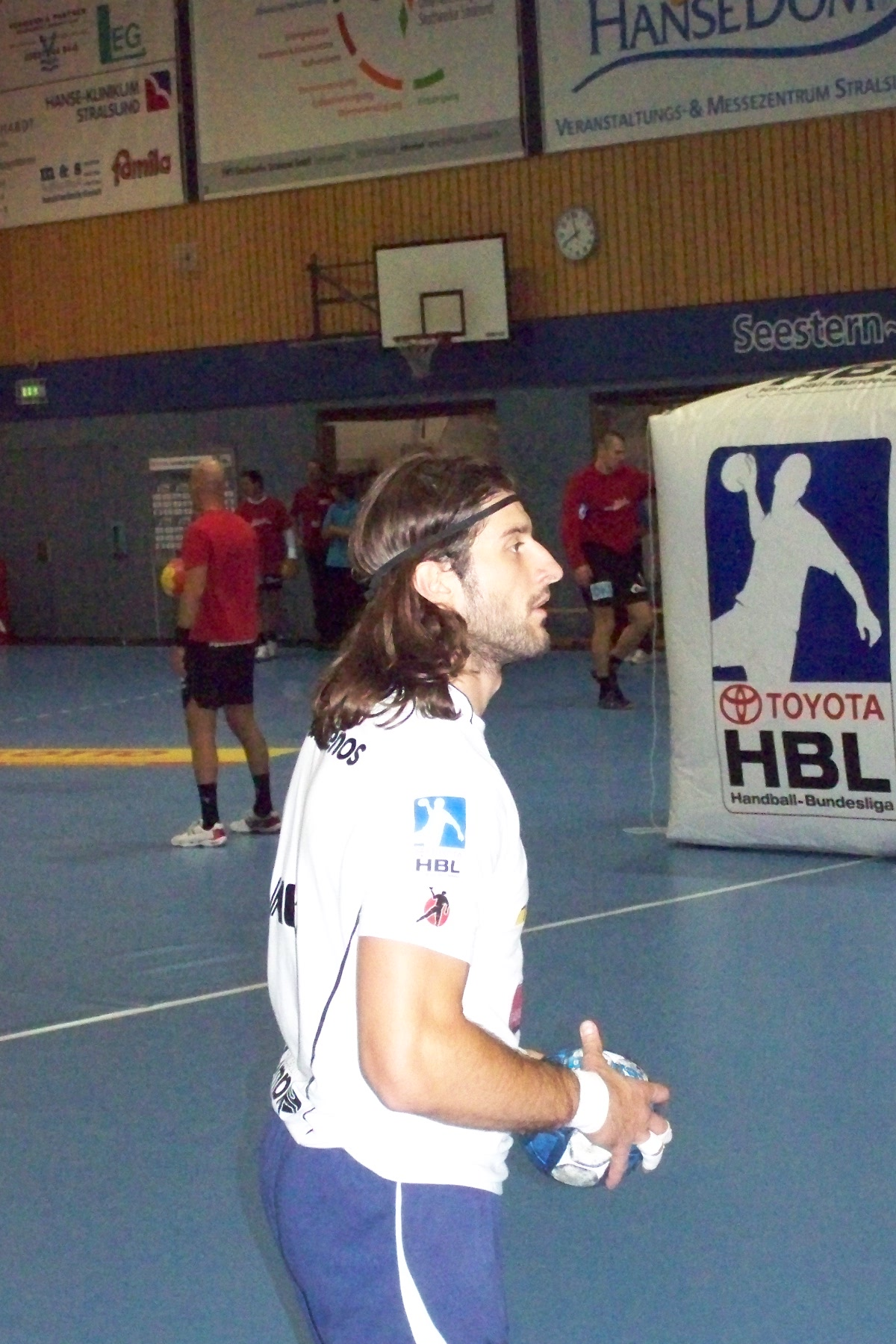
- Spyros Balomenos in 2008

Personal information
- Nationality: Greek
- Born: 28 February 1979 (age 47) Athens, Greece
- Height: 195 cm (77 in)

Sport
- Sport: Handball
- Position: Left back
National team
Years	Team	Apps
–	Greece	120

Teams managed
- –: AEK Athens (assistant)
- 2022-2024: Jags Vöslau
- 2024-: HSG Graz

Spyros Balomenos (born 28 February 1979) is a Greek handball player and coach, who is currently the head coach of Austrian team HSG Graz. He competed in the men's tournament at the 2004 Summer Olympics.

From April 2022 until summer 2024 he was the head coach of Jags Vöslau. In 2024 he became the head coach of HSG Graz.
