= Daniel Dicker =

Austrian handball player (born 1995)

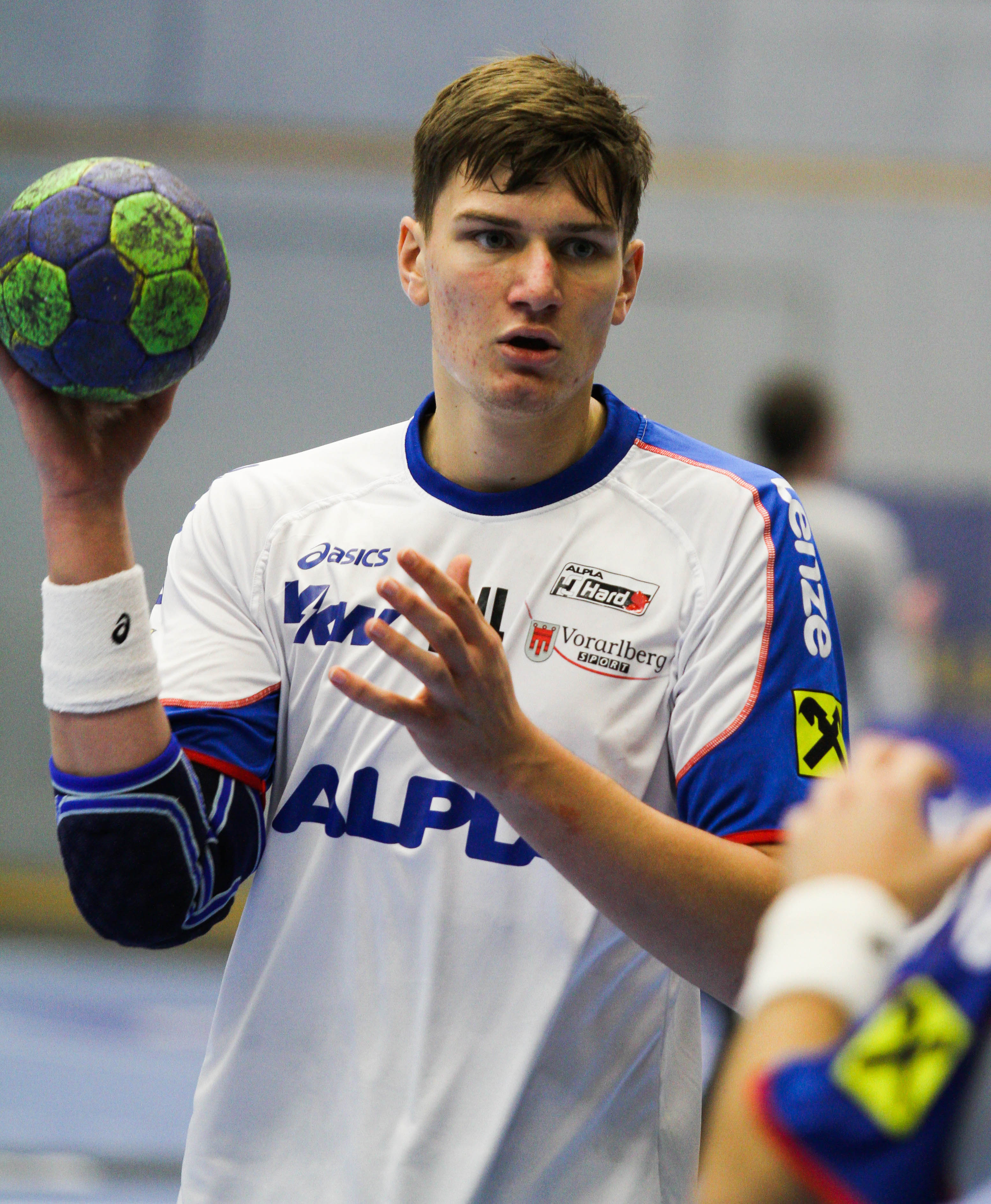

Personal information
- Nationality: Austrian
- Born: 5 June 1995 (age 31) Graz, Austria
- Height: 1.99 m (6 ft 6 in)

Sport
- Sport: Handball
- Position: Left back
- Current club: HSG Graz
- Number: 24
National team
Years	Team	Apps	(Gls)
2019–	Austria	33	(27)
- Updated on 16. September 2022

Daniel Dicker (born 5 June 1995) is an Austrian handball player for HSG Graz and the Austrian national team.

He represented Austria at the 2019 World Men's Handball Championship and the 2020 European Men's Handball Championship.
