= BT Füchse =

Austrian handball club

- Full name: BT-Füchse Handballclub Bruck-Trofaiach
- Short name: BT Füchse
- Founded: 2020; 6 years ago
- Arena: Hannes Bammer Halle, Sporthalle Trofaiach
- Capacity: 1,000
- Head coach: Benjamin Teraš - men's team Mario Maretic - women's team
- League: Handball Liga Austria, Women Handball Liga Austria
- 2023-24: Men's team: 3rd, Women's team: 8th
- Club colours
Home	Away

BT-Füchse Handballclub Bruck-Trofaiach normally just called BT-Füchse is an Austrian handball club from Bruck an der Mur and Trofaiach, Austria.

== History ==
The club was founded in 2020 as a fusion between HC Bruck and ATV Trofaiach. The goal was to create a place for talent development in Obersteiermark.

The women's team started in the top Austrian division. The men's team reached the top division after a year, when they were promoted in the 2020-2021 season by winning the HLA Challenge League.

== Crest, colours, supporters ==
=== Kits ===
AWAY

2021–22

== Team ==
=== Current squad ===
Squad for the 2026–27 season

Goalkeepers

- 24 (Austria) Julian Mittendorfer
- 46 (Austria) Jan Kroiss
- 78 (Austria) Felix Rachwalik

Left Wingers

- 4 (Austria) Philipp Nenadić
- 17 (Austria) Thomas Kuhn

Right Wingers

- 23 (Austria) Christoph Wolfger
- (Austria) Marc Gaydusek

Line players

- 2 (Austria) Clemens Meleschnig
- 95 (Austria) Hasbulat Sabazgiraev
- (Austria) Maximilian Kelich

Left Backs

- 94 (Austria) Christoph Neuhold
- (North Macedonia) Borjan Damjanoski

Central Backs

- 13 (Greece) Christoforos Tsakouridis
- 25 (Slovenia) Tilen Kosi
- 27 (Austria) Florian Hofstätter

Right Backs

=== Transfers ===
Transfers for the 2026–27 season

Joining

- (North Macedonia) Borjan Damjanoski (LB) from (Austria) HSG Graz
- (Austria) Maximilian Kelich (LP) from (Austria) HSG Graz
- (Austria) Marc Gaydusek (RW) from (Austria) UHK Krems

Leaving

- (Luxembourg) Adel Rastoder (LB)
- (Austria) Martin Breg (RW) to (Austria) HSG Graz
- (Austria) Julian Schiffleitner (RB) to (Austria) WAT Atzgersdorf
- (Austria) Fabian Kornsteiner (LW) (retires)
- (Austria) Sandro Jankovic (LP)
- (Austria) Thomas Nenadić (CB)

=== Transfer History ===
Transfers for the 2025–26 season

Joining

- (Greece) Christoforos Tsakouridis (CB) from (Greece) AC Diomidis Argous
- (Austria) Clemens Meleschnig (LP) from (Austria) SG Handball West Wien
- (Austria) Jan Kroiss (GK) from (Austria) Bregenz Handball

Leaving

- (Bosnia and Herzegovina) (Croatia) Marko Karaula (CB) to (Croatia) HRK Gorica
- (Austria) Raul Santos (LW) (retires)
- (Austria) Moritz Krainer (LW) (retires)

== Accomplishments ==
- HLA Challenge League Men
  - Winner 2020-21

== Former club members ==
=== Notable former players ===
Criteria

To appear in this section a player must have either:

- Played at least one official international match for their national team at any time.
- Or spent at least 10 years with the team.

==== Right wingers ====
- (Austria) Martin Breg (2020–2026)

==== Left wingers ====
- (Austria) Raul Santos (2022–2025)

==== Left backs ====
- (Austria) Christoph Neuhold (2022–)

==== Central backs ====
- (Greece) Christoforos Tsakouridis (2025–)

==== Right backs ====
- (Austria) Julian Schiffleitner (2022–2026)

=== Former coaches ===
Seasons	Coach	Country
2020–2021	Dino Poje	(Croatia)
2021	Jürgen Radischnig	(Austria)
2021–	Benjamin Teraš	(Slovenia)
