= 2010 European Men's Handball Championship squads =

This is a list of the 2010 European Men's Handball Championship squads. Each team had until 15 December 2009 to register 28 players. Of these 28 players, the national associations must choose 16 players at least one day before the tournament. After this a maximum of two players can be replaced with a player from the original 28. After the main round has started, yet another player can be replaced.

== Group A ==
=== Croatia ===
Head coach: Slavko Goluža (CRO)

| No. | Pos. | Name | Date of birth (age) | Height | App. | Goals | Club |
|---|---|---|---|---|---|---|---|
| 12 | GK | Goran Čarapina | 12 April 1981 (aged 28) | 195 cm | 0 | 0 | RK Poreč |
| 25 | GK | Mirko Alilović | 15 September 1985 (aged 24) | 200 cm | 61 | 0 | Ademar León |
| 4 | CB | Ivano Balić | 1 April 1979 (aged 30) | 191 cm | 153 | 451 | RK Zagreb |
| 5 | CB | Domagoj Duvnjak | 1 June 1988 (aged 21) | 197 cm | 52 | 167 | HSV Hamburg |
| 6 | LB | Blaženko Lacković | 25 December 1980 (aged 29) | 195 cm | 144 | 432 | HSV Hamburg |
| 7 | RW | Vedran Zrnić | 26 September 1979 (aged 30) | 188 cm | 140 | 321 | VfL Gummersbach |
| 8 | RB | Marko Kopljar | 12 February 1986 (aged 23) | 210 cm | 20 | 33 | RK Zagreb |
| 9 | P | Igor Vori | 20 September 1980 (aged 29) | 202 cm | 139 | 374 | HSV Hamburg |
| 10 | LW | Jakov Gojun | 18 April 1986 (aged 23) | 203 cm | 19 | 17 | RK Zagreb |
| 14 | LB | Drago Vuković | 3 August 1983 (aged 26) | 194 cm | 66 | 83 | VfL Gummersbach |
| 17 | LW | Vedran Mataija | 6 May 1988 (aged 21) | 180 cm | 0 | 0 | RK Poreč |
| 20 | LB | Damir Bičanić | 29 June 1985 (aged 24) | 194 cm | 20 | 41 | Ademar León |
| 21 | RB | Denis Buntić | 13 October 1982 (aged 27) | 198 cm | 56 | 103 | Ademar León |
| 24 | LB | Tonči Valčić | 9 June 1978 (aged 31) | 194 cm | 124 | 205 | RK Zagreb |
| 26 | LW | Manuel Štrlek | 1 December 1988 (aged 21) | 181 cm | 5 | 18 | RK Zagreb |
| 27 | RW | Ivan Čupić | 27 March 1986 (aged 23) | 175 cm | 39 | 143 | RK Gorenje Velenje |
| 28 | P | Željko Musa | 8 January 1986 (aged 24) | 200 cm | 2 | 3 | RK Trimo Trebnje |

=== Norway ===
Head coach: Robert Hedin (SWE)

| No. | Pos. | Name | Date of birth (age) | Height | App. | Goals | Club |
|---|---|---|---|---|---|---|---|
| 1 | GK | Steinar Ege | 10 April 1972 (aged 37) | 194 cm | 230 | 1 | FCK Håndbold |
| 12 | GK | Ole Erevik | 9 January 1981 (aged 29) | 196 cm | 95 | 0 | KIF Kolding |
| 24 | GK | Magnus Dahl | 28 September 1988 (aged 21) | 197 cm | 8 | 0 | Fyllingen HB |
| 3 | LB | Stian Vatne | 10 May 1974 (aged 35) | 200 cm | 97 | 128 | Füchse Berlin |
| 5 | P | Frank Løke | 6 February 1980 (aged 29) | 193 cm | 166 | 610 | RK Zagreb |
| 6 | CB | Kjetil Strand | 2 October 1979 (aged 30) | 190 cm | 88 | 434 | Füchse Berlin |
| 7 | RW | Lars Erik Bjørnsen | 20 July 1982 (aged 27) | 183 cm | 59 | 104 | Team Tvis Holstebro |
| 8 | P | Bjarte Myrhol | 28 September 1988 (aged 21) | 190 cm | 91 | 199 | Rhein Neckar Löwen |
| 9 | CB | Børge Lund | 13 May 1979 (aged 30) | 196 cm | 154 | 296 | THW Kiel |
| 10 | LW | Håvard Tvedten | 29 July 1978 (aged 31) | 182cm | 156 | 555 | BM Valladolid |
| 11 | LB | Erlend Mamelund | 1 May 1984 (aged 25) | 197 cm | 56 | 179 | FCK Håndbold |
| 13 | RB | Christoffer Rambo | 18 November 1989 (aged 20) | 201 cm | 11 | 12 | IL Runar Sandefjord |
| 15 | LB | Kristian Kjelling | 6 September 1980 (aged 29) | 197 cm | 122 | 468 | AaB Håndbold |
| 18 | RB | Vegard Samdahl | 21 March 1978 (aged 31) | 194 cm | 36 | 72 | Wisła Płock |
| 19 | LW | Thomas Skoglund | 3 March 1983 (aged 26) | 182 cm | 72 | 161 | GOG Svendborg |
| 20 | P | Einar Sand Koren | 12 November 1984 (aged 25) | 190 cm | 23 | 44 | FCK Håndbold |
| 22 | RW | Christian Spanne | 22 June 1986 (aged 23) | 180 cm | 22 | 38 | Drammen HK |

=== Russia ===
Head coach: Vladimir Maximov (RUS)

| No. | Pos. | Name | Date of birth (age) | Height | App. | Goals | Club |
|---|---|---|---|---|---|---|---|
| 1 | GK | Oleg Grams | 20 February 1984 (aged 25) | 201 cm | 67 | 0 | Chekhovskiye Medvedi |
| 16 | GK | Aleksey Kostygov | 5 July 1973 (aged 36) | 191 cm | 131 | 1 | University-Neva St. Petersburg |
| 2 | CB | Vasily Filippov | 18 January 1981 (aged 29) | 183 cm | 101 | 227 | Chekhovskiye Medvedi |
| 3 | P | Oleg Zotov | 28 June 1984 (aged 25) | 200 cm | 0 | 0 | Chekhovskiye Medvedi |
| 7 | RW | Dmitry Kovalyov | 15 May 1982 (aged 27) | 180 cm | 90 | 198 | Chekhovskiye Medvedi |
| 10 | P | Aleksandr Chernoivanov | 13 February 1979 (aged 30) | 203 cm | 80 | 184 | Chekhovskiye Medvedi |
| 15 | LB | Aleksey Rastvortsev | 8 August 1978 (aged 31) | 200 cm | 214 | 812 | Chekhovskiye Medvedi |
| 17 | RB | Alexey Kamanin | 6 June 1978 (aged 31) | 200 cm | 180 | 376 | Chekhovskiye Medvedi |
| 19 | RB | Samvel Aslanyan | 23 February 1986 (aged 23) | 186 cm | 41 | 56 | Chekhovskiye Medvedi |
| 20 | P | Mikhail Chipurin | 17 November 1980 (aged 29) | 190 cm | 123 | 323 | Chekhovskiye Medvedi |
| 31 | LW | Timur Dibirov | 30 July 1983 (aged 26) | 180 cm | 85 | 283 | Chekhovskiye Medvedi |
| 33 | RW | Sergei Predybailov | 1 April 1982 (aged 27) | 184 cm | 27 | 68 | Zarja Kaspija Astrakhan |
| 35 | RB | Konstantin Igropulo | 14 April 1985 (aged 24) | 190 cm | 77 | 352 | FC Barcelona |
| 47 | RB | Andrei Starych | 2 February 1984 (aged 25) | 198 cm | 32 | 34 | Chekhovskiye Medvedi |
| 77 | CB | Vitali Ivanov | 3 February 1976 (aged 33) | 194 cm | 213 | 497 | Chekhovskiye Medvedi |
| 79 | LW | Alexey Kaynarov | 1 April 1979 (aged 30) | 185 cm | 53 | 65 | Zarja Kaspija Astrakhan |

=== Ukraine ===
Head coach: Leonid Zaharov (UKR)

| No. | Pos. | Name | Date of birth (age) | Height | App. | Goals | Club |
|---|---|---|---|---|---|---|---|
| 1 | GK | Serhij Bilyk | 9 February 1970 (aged 39) | 201 cm | 53 | 0 | Aon Fivers |
| 12 | GK | Vadym Brazhnyk | 25 February 1975 (aged 34) | 200 cm | 12 | 0 | Budiwelnyk Browary |
| 16 | GK | Gennadiy Komok | 5 July 1987 (aged 22) | 190 cm | 13 | 0 | HC ZTR Zaporizhzhia |
| 2 | CB | Olexandr Pedan | 10 March 1986 (aged 23) | 192 cm | 17 | 9 | HC ZTR Zaporizhzhia |
| 4 | LB | Sergii Liubchenko | 31 May 1984 (aged 25) | 201 cm | 8 | 13 | HC ZTR Zaporizhzhia |
| 5 | CB | Yuriy Petrenko | 17 November 1977 (aged 32) | 187 cm | 59 | 146 | Paris HB |
| 6 | LW | Vitaliy Nat | 12 April 1977 (aged 32) | 183 cm | 78 | 272 | Vive Kielce |
| 7 | P | Olexandr Shevelev | 2 December 1987 (aged 22) | 200 cm | 21 | 37 | HK Portowyk Yuzhne |
| 8 | RW | Mykola Stetsyura | 20 July 1986 (aged 23) | 185 cm | 23 | 23 | HC ZTR Zaporizhzhia |
| 9 | RW | Olexij Hantschew | 22 August 1988 (aged 21) | 190 cm | 17 | 39 | HC ZTR Zaporizhzhia |
| 10 | P | Andrij Nataljuk | 28 January 1971 (aged 38) | 201 cm | 77 | 6 | HC ZTR Zaporizhzhia |
| 13 | LW | Mykhaylo Krivchikov | 12 January 1987 (aged 23) | 173 cm | 24 | 55 | HC ZTR Zaporizhzhia |
| 14 | P | Dmytro Doroshchuk | 29 September 1986 (aged 23) | 200 cm | 15 | 15 | HK Portowyk Yuzhne |
| 15 | LB | Serhij Burka | 9 June 1987 (aged 22) | 207 cm | 23 | 64 | HC ZTR Zaporizhzhia |
| 17 | LB | Vladyslav Ostroushko | 5 March 1986 (aged 23) | 200 cm | 10 | 26 | HC ZTR Zaporizhzhia |
| 18 | RB | Sergiy Onufriyenko | 31 January 1985 (aged 24) | 185 cm | 26 | 143 | Dynamo Minsk |

== Group B ==
=== Austria ===
Head coach: Dagur Sigurðsson (ISL)

| No. | Pos. | Name | Date of birth (age) | Height | App. | Goals | Club |
|---|---|---|---|---|---|---|---|
| 1 | GK | Thomas Bauer | 24 January 1986 (aged 23) | 1,89 m | 26 | 0 | TV Korschenbroich |
| 12 | GK | Nikola Marinovic | 29 August 1976 (aged 33) | 1,98 m | 76 | 0 | HBW Balingen-Weilstetten |
| 3 | P | Patrick Fölser | 16 November 1976 (aged 33) | 1,93 m | 171 | 478 | HSG Düsseldorf |
| 5 | RB | Vytautas Žiūra | 11 May 1979 (aged 30) | 1,88 m | 29 | 67 | Viborg HK |
| 7 | RW | Robert Weber | 25 November 1985 (aged 24) | 1,79 m | 62 | 203 | SC Magdeburg |
| 9 | CB | Martin Abadir | 19 June 1981 (aged 28) | 1,96 m | 51 | 85 | Margareten |
| 10 | RB | Lucas Mayer | 16 February 1983 (aged 26) | 1,85 m | 21 | 71 | A1 Bregenz |
| 11 | LW | Michael Knauth | 7 January 1983 (aged 27) | 1,8 m | 30 | 47 | Alpla HC Hard |
| 13 | P | Matthias Günther | 11 October 1976 (aged 33) | 1,9 m | 121 | 148 | A1 Bregenz |
| 14 | CB | Viktor Szilágyi | 16 September 1978 (aged 31) | 1,96 m | 130 | 584 | VfL Gummersbach |
| 17 | LW | Konrad Wilczynski | 9 February 1982 (aged 27) | 1,8 m | 85 | 389 | Füchse Berlin |
| 18 | LW | Michael Jochum | 8 November 1985 (aged 24) | 1,83 m | 5 | 11 | Alpla HC Hard |
| 20 | LB | Bernd Friede | 18 February 1980 (aged 29) | 1,91 m | 41 | 68 | TSV St. Otmar |
| 21 | LB | Roland Schlinger | 17 September 1982 (aged 27) | 1,91 m | 100 | 378 | A1 Bregenz |
| 22 | LB | Markus Wagesreiter | 14 January 1982 (aged 28) | 1,97 m | 70 | 69 | HBW Balingen-Weilstetten |
| 25 | CB | Mare Hojc | 5 January 1982 (aged 28) | 1,85 m | 7 | 1 | HBW Balingen-Weilstetten |

=== Denmark ===
Head coach: Ulrik Wilbek (DEN)

| No. | Pos. | Name | Date of birth (age) | Height | App. | Goals | Club |
|---|---|---|---|---|---|---|---|
| 1 | GK | Kasper Hvidt | 6 February 1976 (aged 33) | 1,92 m | 212 | 1 | FCK Håndbold |
| 12 | GK | Niklas Landin Jacobsen | 19 December 1988 (aged 21) | 2 m | 21 | 0 | GOG Svendborg |
| 2 | CB | Thomas Mogensen | 30 January 1983 (aged 26) | 1,86 m | 50 | 115 | SG Flensburg-Handewitt |
| 5 | P | Torsten Laen | 26 November 1979 (aged 30) | 1,98 m | 145 | 245 | Füchse Berlin |
| 6 | LB | Lars Jørgensen | 3 February 1978 (aged 31) | 1,93 m | 185 | 141 | AG København |
| 9 | LW | Lars Christiansen | 18 April 1972 (aged 37) | 1,82 m | 294 | 1370 | SG Flensburg-Handewitt |
| 10 | CB | Henrik Knudsen | 6 March 1982 (aged 27) | 1,83 m | 8 | 19 | Vive Kielce |
| 11 | LW | Anders Eggert | 14 May 1982 (aged 27) | 1,79 m | 46 | 169 | SG Flensburg-Handewitt |
| 13 | CB | Bo Spellerberg | 24 July 1979 (aged 30) | 1,92 m | 152 | 228 | KIF Kolding |
| 14 | P | Michael V. Knudsen | 4 September 1978 (aged 31) | 1,89 m | 204 | 686 | SG Flensburg-Handewitt |
| 17 | RW | Lasse Svan Hansen | 31 August 1983 (aged 26) | 1,84 m | 38 | 78 | SG Flensburg-Handewitt |
| 18 | RW | Hans Lindberg | 1 August 1981 (aged 28) | 1,86 m | 103 | 256 | HSV Hamburg |
| 22 | RB | Kasper Søndergaard | 9 August 1981 (aged 28) | 1,9 m | 64 | 149 | KIF Kolding |
| 24 | LB | Mikkel Hansen | 22 October 1987 (aged 22) | 1,92 m | 36 | 128 | FC Barcelona |
| 26 | LB | Kasper Nielsen | 9 June 1975 (aged 34) | 1,92 m | 129 | 273 | GOG Svendborg |
| 27 | | Mads Ø. Nielsen | 17 March 1981 (aged 28) | 1,97 m | 18 | 49 | Bjerringbro-Silkeborg |

=== Iceland ===
Head coach: Guðmundur Guðmundsson (ISL)

| No. | Pos. | Name | Date of birth (age) | Height | App. | Goals | Club |
|---|---|---|---|---|---|---|---|
| 1 | GK | Björgvin Páll Gústavsson | 24 May 1985 (aged 24) | 1,93 m | 58 | 3 | Kadetten Schaffhausen |
| 16 | GK | Hreiðar Guðmundsson | 29 November 1980 (aged 29) | 1,93 m | 91 | 2 | TV Emsdetten |
| 2 | P | Vignir Svavarsson | 20 June 1980 (aged 29) | 1,94 m | 117 | 131 | TBV Lemgo |
| 3 | LB | Logi Geirsson | 10 October 1982 (aged 27) | 1,92 m | 82 | 286 | TBV Lemgo |
| 4 | CB | Aron Pálmarsson | 19 July 1990 (aged 19) | 1,93 m | 10 | 27 | THW Kiel |
| 5 | LB | Ingimundur Ingimundarson | 29 January 1980 (aged 29) | 1,93 m | 64 | 48 | GWD Minden |
| 6 | RB | Ásgeir Örn Hallgrímsson | 17 February 1984 (aged 25) | 1,91 m | 116 | 159 | GOG Svendborg |
| 7 | CB | Arnór Atlason | 23 July 1984 (aged 25) | 1,91 m | 79 | 167 | FCK Håndbold |
| 9 | LW | Guðjón Valur Sigurðsson | 8 August 1979 (aged 30) | 1,87 m | 223 | 1077 | Rhein Neckar Löwen |
| 10 | CB | Snorri Guðjónsson | 17 October 1981 (aged 28) | 1,87 m | 149 | 549 | Rhein-Neckar Löwen |
| 11 | RB | Ólafur Stefánsson | 3 July 1973 (aged 36) | 1,96 m | 286 | 1359 | Rhein-Neckar Löwen |
| 14 | LW | Sturla Ásgeirsson | 20 July 1980 (aged 29) | 1,82 m | 37 | 54 | HSG Düsseldorf |
| 15 | RW | Alexander Petersson | 2 July 1980 (aged 29) | 1,86 m | 92 | 359 | SG Flensburg-Handewitt |
| 17 | P | Sverre Andreas Jakobsson | 8 February 1977 (aged 32) | 1,96 m | 73 | 16 | TV Großwallstadt |
| 18 | P | Róbert Gunnarsson | 22 May 1980 (aged 29) | 1,9 m | 156 | 478 | VfL Gummersbach |
| 22 | LB | Ólafur Guðmundsson | 13 May 1990 (aged 19) | 1,92 m | 9 | 14 | FH Hafnarfjörður |

=== Serbia ===
Head coach: Sead Hasanefendić (BIH)

| No. | Pos. | Name | Date of birth (age) | Height | App. | Goals | Club |
|---|---|---|---|---|---|---|---|
| 1 | GK | Darko Stanić | 8 October 1978 (aged 31) | 1,9 m | 65 | 0 | RK Koper |
| 12 | GK | Dejan Perić | 22 September 1970 (aged 39) | 1,84 m | 205 | 1 | KC Veszprém |
| 16 | GK | Dimitrije Pejanović | 9 July 1974 (aged 35) | 1,98 m | 50 | 0 | BM Torrevieja |
| 3 | RB | Nikola Kojić | 28 March 1979 (aged 30) | 1,87 m | 97 | 197 | RK Celje |
| 5 | CB | Žarko Šešum | 16 June 1986 (aged 23) | 1,95 m | 65 | 257 | KC Veszprém |
| 7 | LW | Ivan Nikčević | 11 February 1981 (aged 28) | 1,81 m | 76 | 319 | SDC San Antonio |
| 9 | RB | Aleksandar Stojanović | 22 June 1983 (aged 26) | 1,97 m | 63 | 228 | Kadetten Schaffhausen |
| 11 | P | Alem Toskić | 12 February 1982 (aged 27) | 1,9 m | 79 | 101 | RK Celje |
| 13 | LB | Momir Ilić | 22 December 1981 (aged 28) | 2 m | 87 | 498 | THW Kiel |
| 15 | LW | Dobrivoje Marković | 22 April 1986 (aged 23) | 1,91 m | 51 | 124 | Cuenca 2016 |
| 18 | CB | Danijel Anđelković | 28 August 1978 (aged 31) | 1,87 m | 101 | 333 | SC Szeged |
| 19 | LB | Ivan Lapčević | 26 March 1976 (aged 33) | 2,01 m | 119 | 311 | KC Veszprém |
| 22 | P | Uroš Vilovski | 25 February 1984 (aged 25) | 1,93 m | 33 | 36 | KC Veszprém |
| 23 | LB | Nenad Vučković | 23 August 1980 (aged 29) | 1,92 m | 7 | 188 | MT Melsungen |
| 25 | CB | Petar Nenadić | 28 June 1986 (aged 23) | 1,99 m | 35 | 85 | SC Szeged |
| 26 | RB | Ivan Stanković | 27 April 1982 (aged 27) | 1,92 m | 12 | 34 | BM Aragón |

== Group C ==
=== Germany ===
Head coach: Heiner Brand (GER)

| No. | Pos. | Name | Date of birth (age) | Height | App. | Goals | Club |
|---|---|---|---|---|---|---|---|
| 1 | GK | Johannes Bitter | 2 September 1982 (aged 27) | 2,04 m | 120 | 2 | HSV Hamburg |
| 12 | GK | Silvio Heinevetter | 21 October 1984 (aged 25) | 1,94 m | 28 | 0 | Füchse Berlin |
| 3 | LW | Uwe Gensheimer | 26 October 1986 (aged 23) | 1,88 m | 27 | 94 | Rhein-Neckar Löwen |
| 4 | P | Oliver Roggisch | 25 August 1978 (aged 31) | 2,02 m | 127 | 28 | Rhein-Neckar Löwen |
| 6 | RB | Michael Müller | 19 September 1984 (aged 25) | 1,97 m | 36 | 93 | Rhein-Neckar Löwen |
| 7 | CB | Martin Strobel | 5 June 1986 (aged 23) | 1,89 m | 40 | 55 | TBV Lemgo |
| 9 | P | Christoph Theuerkauf | 13 October 1984 (aged 25) | 1,92 m | 19 | 39 | SC Magdeburg |
| 11 | RB | Holger Glandorf | 30 March 1983 (aged 26) | 1,95 m | 114 | 404 | TBV Lemgo |
| 13 | LB | Sven-Sören Christophersen | 9 May 1985 (aged 24) | 1,98 m | 30 | 51 | HSG Wetzlar |
| 15 | LW | Torsten Jansen | 23 December 1976 (aged 33) | 1,85 m | 170 | 472 | HSV Hamburg |
| 17 | P | Manuel Späth | 16 October 1985 (aged 24) | 1,99 m | 16 | 18 | Frisch Auf Göppingen |
| 18 | CB | Michael Kraus | 28 September 1983 (aged 26) | 1,87 m | 89 | 279 | TBV Lemgo |
| 19 | RW | Christian Schöne | 23 February 1981 (aged 28) | 1,88 m | 74 | 126 | Frisch Auf Göppingen |
| 20 | RW | Christian Sprenger | 6 April 1983 (aged 26) | 1,9 m | 53 | 111 | THW Kiel |
| 21 | LB | Lars Kaufmann | 25 February 1982 (aged 27) | 1,99 m | 85 | 201 | Frisch Auf Göppingen |
| 22 | RW | Stefan Schröder | 17 July 1981 (aged 28) | 1,83 m | 47 | 99 | HSV Hamburg |
| 24 | CB | Michael Haaß | 12 December 1983 (aged 26) | 1,94 m | 47 | 50 | Frisch Auf Göppingen |

=== Poland ===
Head coach: Bogdan Wenta (POL)

| No. | Pos. | Name | Date of birth (age) | Height | App. | Goals | Club |
|---|---|---|---|---|---|---|---|
| 1 | GK | Sławomir Szmal | 2 October 1978 (aged 31) | 1,9 m | 178 | 2 | Rhein Neckar Löwen |
| 16 | GK | Piotr Wyszomirski | 6 January 1988 (aged 22) | 1,94 m | 6 | 0 | KS Azoty-Puławy |
| 2 | CB | Bartłomiej Jaszka | 16 June 1983 (aged 26) | 1,84 m | 77 | 108 | Füchse Berlin |
| 3 | RB | Krzysztof Lijewski | 7 July 1983 (aged 26) | 1,98 m | 94 | 189 | HSV Hamburg |
| 4 | RB | Patryk Kuchczyński | 17 March 1983 (aged 26) | 1,82 m | 133 | 271 | Vive Kielce |
| 5 | LW | Mateusz Jachlewski | 27 December 1984 (aged 25) | 1,82 m | 82 | 205 | Vive Kielce |
| 8 | LB | Karol Bielecki | 23 January 1982 (aged 27) | 2,01 m | 139 | 615 | Rhein-Neckar Löwen |
| 9 | P | Artur Siódmiak | 7 October 1975 (aged 34) | 1,92 m | 112 | 94 | TuS Nettelstedt-Lübbecke |
| 10 | P | Daniel Żółtak | 28 February 1984 (aged 25) | 1,95 m | 48 | 32 | Vive Kielce |
| 13 | P | Bartosz Jurecki | 31 January 1979 (aged 30) | 1,93 m | 119 | 379 | SC Magdeburg |
| 14 | RW | Mariusz Jurasik | 4 May 1976 (aged 33) | 1,92 m | 176 | 644 | Vive Kielce |
| 15 | LB | Michał Jurecki | 27 October 1984 (aged 25) | 2,02 m | 93 | 189 | TuS Nettelstedt-Lübbecke |
| 19 | LW | Tomasz Tłuczyński | 19 April 1979 (aged 30) | 1,82 m | 84 | 343 | TuS Nettelstedt-Lübbecke |
| 20 | LB | Mariusz Jurkiewicz | 3 February 1982 (aged 27) | 1,96 m | 70 | 122 | SDC San Antonio |
| 22 | RB | Marcin Lijewski | 21 September 1977 (aged 32) | 1,97 m | 212 | 635 | HSV Hamburg |
| 32 | LW | Tomasz Rosiński | 24 February 1984 (aged 25) | 1,92 m | 7 | 12 | Vive Kielce |

=== Slovenia ===
Head coach: Zvonimir Serdarušić (GER)

| No. | Pos. | Name | Date of birth (age) | Height | App. | Goals | Club |
|---|---|---|---|---|---|---|---|
| 12 | GK | Gorazd Škof | 11 July 1977 (aged 32) | 1,88 m | 103 | 0 | RK Zagreb |
| 16 | GK | Aljoša Rezar | 24 February 1983 (aged 26) | 1,9 m | 27 | 0 | RK Celje |
| 2 | LB | Miladin Kozlina | 11 February 1983 (aged 26) | 1,98 m | 101 | 242 | RK Celje |
| 4 | RB | Renato Vugrinec | 9 June 1975 (aged 34) | 1,96 m | 185 | 598 | RK Celje |
| 5 | LW | Jure Dobelšek | 1 April 1984 (aged 25) | 1,93 m | 39 | 78 | RK Gorenje Velenje |
| 6 | P | Zoran Lubej | 14 December 1975 (aged 34) | 1,93 m | 157 | 385 | RK Zagreb |
| 7 | RW | Vid Kavtičnik | 24 May 1984 (aged 25) | 1,91 m | 104 | 319 | Montpellier HB |
| 9 | RB | Jure Natek | 30 March 1982 (aged 27) | 1,93 m | 118 | 290 | RK Gorenje Velenje |
| 11 | CB | Sebastian Skube | 3 April 1987 (aged 22) | 1,89 m | 20 | 44 | RK Trimo Trebnje |
| 13 | CB | David Špiler | 2 January 1983 (aged 27) | 1,89 m | 77 | 174 | RK Celje |
| 14 | RW | Matjaž Brumen | 23 December 1982 (aged 27) | 1,9 m | 110 | 327 | RK Celje |
| 15 | LB | Aleš Pajovič | 6 January 1979 (aged 31) | 1,97 m | 165 | 689 | RK Celje |
| 17 | RW | Dragan Gajič | 21 July 1984 (aged 25) | 1,9 m | 76 | 187 | RK Zagreb |
| 19 | P | Miha Žvižej | 6 November 1987 (aged 22) | 1,93 m | 22 | 56 | RK Gorenje Velenje |
| 20 | LW | Luka Žvižej | 9 December 1980 (aged 29) | 1,85 m | 142 | 400 | SC Szeged |
| 24 | CB | Uroš Zorman | 9 January 1980 (aged 30) | 1,9 m | 138 | 359 | RK Celje |

=== Sweden ===
Head coach: Staffan Olsson (SWE)

| No. | Pos. | Name | Date of birth (age) | Height | App. | Goals | Club |
|---|---|---|---|---|---|---|---|
| 1 | GK | Mattias Andersson | 29 March 1978 (aged 31) | 1,86 m | 45 | 0 | TV Großwallstadt |
| 12 | GK | Dan Beutler | 7 October 1977 (aged 32) | 1,93 m | 58 | 0 | SG Flensburg-Handewitt |
| 3 | P | Mattias Gustafsson | 10 July 1978 (aged 31) | 1,93 m | 60 | 99 | AaB Aalborg |
| 5 | RB | Kim Andersson | 21 August 1982 (aged 27) | 1,99 m | 161 | 602 | THW Kiel |
| 6 | LW | Jonas Källman | 17 July 1981 (aged 28) | 2 m | 136 | 412 | BM Ciudad Real |
| 8 | CB | Lukas Karlsson | 21 May 1982 (aged 27) | 1,78 m | 39 | 97 | KIF Kolding |
| 9 | RW | Jan Lennartsson | 22 September 1981 (aged 28) | 1,85 m | 103 | 257 | AaB Aalborg |
| 10 | RW | Niclas Ekberg | 23 December 1988 (aged 21) | 1,91 m | 19 | 64 | Ystads IF |
| 11 | CB | Dalibor Doder | 24 May 1979 (aged 30) | 1,82 m | 97 | 293 | Ademar León |
| 14 | P | Robert Arrhenius | 14 May 1979 (aged 30) | 1,95 m | 171 | 337 | BM Aragón |
| 17 | RB | Oscar Carlén | 11 May 1988 (aged 21) | 1,93 m | 57 | 132 | SG Flensburg-Handewitt |
| 18 | LB | Tobias Karlsson | 4 June 1981 (aged 28) | 1,96 m | 60 | 48 | SG Flensburg-Handewitt |
| 22 | GK | Johan Sjöstrand | 26 February 1987 (aged 22) | 1,95 m | 21 | 0 | SG Flensburg-Handewitt |
| 23 | CB | Fredrik Larsson | 14 April 1984 (aged 25) | 1,93 m | 14 | 32 | BM Aragón |
| 24 | LW | Fredrik Petersen | 27 August 1983 (aged 26) | 1,88 m | 28 | 78 | GOG Svendborg |
| 25 | LB | Kim Ekdahl Du Rietz | 23 July 1989 (aged 20) | 1,96 m | 11 | 11 | LUGI HF |

== Group D ==
=== Czech Republic ===
Head coach: Martin Lipták (SVK)

| No. | Pos. | Name | Date of birth (age) | Height | App. | Goals | Club |
|---|---|---|---|---|---|---|---|
| 16 | GK | Martin Galia | 12 April 1979 (aged 30) | 1,89 m | 121 | 3 | TBV Lemgo |
| 71 | GK | Petr Štochl | 24 April 1976 (aged 33) | 1,93 m | 131 | 2 | Füchse Berlin |
| 2 | LW | Karel Nocar | 28 February 1977 (aged 32) | 1,84 m | 161 | 366 | Chambéry Savoie |
| 3 | RB | Jiří Vítek | 14 May 1977 (aged 32) | 1,95 m | 66 | 183 | Bergischer HC |
| 4 | LW | Pavel Mičkal | 31 January 1984 (aged 25) | 1,84 m | 31 | 40 | HSG Nordhorn |
| 5 | CB | Ondřej Zdráhala | 10 July 1983 (aged 26) | 1,88 m | 39 | 116 | HCB Karviná |
| 6 | P | Václav Vraný | 13 September 1982 (aged 27) | 2,02 m | 40 | 67 | HSC 2000 Coburg |
| 7 | LB | Daniel Kubeš | 7 February 1978 (aged 31) | 1,99 m | 95 | 182 | TBV Lemgo |
| 8 | P | Kamil Piskač | 4 October 1978 (aged 31) | 1,86 m | 15 | 22 | Dukla Praha |
| 9 | LB | Filip Jícha | 19 April 1982 (aged 27) | 2 m | 105 | 544 | THW Kiel |
| 10 | RW | Jan Filip | 14 June 1973 (aged 36) | 1,88 m | 180 | 891 | Kadetten Schaffhausen |
| 11 | RW | Jan Sobol | 22 May 1984 (aged 25) | 1,88 m | 65 | 212 | Montpellier HB |
| 15 | LB | Alois Mráz | 8 September 1978 (aged 31) | 1,95 m | 101 | 259 | HSG Wetzlar |
| 18 | RB | Jan Stehlík | 18 April 1985 (aged 24) | 1,88 m | 23 | 45 | Saint-Raphaël |
| 19 | LB | Jiří Hynek | 7 June 1981 (aged 28) | 1,98 m | 76 | 10 | Ahlener SG |
| 22 | LB | Tomáš Sklenák | 2 March 1982 (aged 27) | 1,86 m | 14 | 42 | ThSV Eisenach |

=== France ===
Head coach: Claude Onesta (FRA)

| No. | Pos. | Name | Date of birth (age) | Height | App. | Goals | Club |
|---|---|---|---|---|---|---|---|
| 12 | GK | Daouda Karaboué | 11 December 1975 (aged 34) | 1,98 m | 91 | 0 | Montpellier Handball |
| 16 | GK | Thierry Omeyer | 2 November 1976 (aged 33) | 1,92 m | 222 | 0 | THW Kiel |
| 2 | LB | Jérôme Fernandez | 7 March 1977 (aged 32) | 1,99 m | 287 | 1140 | BM Ciudad Real |
| 3 | P | Didier Dinart | 18 January 1977 (aged 33) | 1,99 m | 314 | 150 | BM Ciudad Real |
| 4 | RB | Xavier Barachet | 19 November 1988 (aged 21) | 1,85 m | 0 | 0 | Chambéry Savoie |
| 5 | CB | Guillaume Gille | 12 July 1976 (aged 33) | 1,92 m | 269 | 652 | HSV Hamburg |
| 6 | P | Bertrand Gille | 24 March 1978 (aged 31) | 1,87 m | 219 | 689 | HSV Hamburg |
| 8 | LB | Daniel Narcisse | 16 December 1979 (aged 30) | 1,89 m | 198 | 624 | THW Kiel |
| 9 | RW | Guillaume Joli | 27 March 1985 (aged 24) | 1,78 m | 21 | 44 | Chambéry Savoie |
| 13 | LB | Nikola Karabatic | 11 April 1984 (aged 25) | 1,95 m | 149 | 627 | Montpellier Handball |
| 15 | CB | Franck Junillon | 28 November 1978 (aged 31) | 1,95 m | 80 | 110 | MT Melsungen |
| 19 | RW | Luc Abalo | 6 September 1984 (aged 25) | 1,82 m | 104 | 366 | BM Ciudad Real |
| 20 | P | Cédric Sorhaindo | 7 June 1984 (aged 25) | 1,92 m | 42 | 73 | Paris HB |
| 21 | LW | Michaël Guigou | 28 January 1982 (aged 27) | 1,79 m | 127 | 464 | Montpellier Handball |
| 23 | RB | Sébastien Bosquet | 24 February 1979 (aged 30) | 1,98 m | 71 | 144 | Dunkerque HGL |
| 24 | LW | Sébastien Ostertag | 16 March 1979 (aged 30) | 1,73 m | 34 | 93 | Tremblay-en-France Handball |
| 25 | P | Grégoire Detrez | 22 May 1981 (aged 28) | 1,84 m | 18 | 29 | Chambéry Savoie |

=== Hungary ===
Head coach: István Csoknyai (HUN)

| No. | Pos. | Name | Date of birth (age) | Height | App. | Goals | Club |
|---|---|---|---|---|---|---|---|
| 1 | GK | Nenad Puljezević | 13 March 1973 (aged 36) | 1,95 m | 42 | 0 | TSV Hannover-Burgdorf |
| 12 | GK | Nándor Fazekas | 16 October 1976 (aged 33) | 1,92 m | 172 | 1 | KC Veszprém |
| 3 | LB | Ferenc Ilyés | 20 December 1981 (aged 28) | 1,98 m | 127 | 342 | TBV Lemgo |
| 5 | LB/CB | Gábor Császár | 16 June 1984 (aged 25) | 1,83 m | 113 | 335 | Chambery Savoie |
| 7 | P | Gyula Gál | 18 August 1976 (aged 33) | 1,93 m | 164 | 413 | RK Zagreb |
| 8 | LW | Gergő Iváncsik | 30 November 1981 (aged 28) | 1,9 m | 163 | 422 | KC Veszprém |
| 9 | RW | Tamás Iváncsik | 3 April 1983 (aged 26) | 1,8 m | 77 | 196 | KC Veszprém |
| 13 | RB | Milorad Krivokapić | 30 July 1980 (aged 29) | 1,9 m | 7 | 27 | SC Szeged |
| 15 | LW | Szabolcs Törő | 10 March 1983 (aged 26) | 1,83 m | 68 | 124 | JD Arrate |
| 17 | RB | Balázs Laluska | 20 June 1981 (aged 28) | 2,02 m | 110 | 188 | RK Koper |
| 18 | CB | Kornél Nagy | 21 November 1986 (aged 23) | 1,92 m | 41 | 59 | Dunaferr SE |
| 20 | RW | Péter Gulyás | 4 March 1984 (aged 25) | 2,01 m | 41 | 113 | KC Veszprém |
| 22 | LB | Dávid Katzirz | 25 June 1980 (aged 29) | 1,95 m | 71 | 100 | SC Szeged |
| 23 | CB | Nikola Eklemović | 8 February 1978 (aged 31) | 1,93 m | 29 | 76 | KC Veszprém |
| 25 | P | Szabolcs Zubai | 31 March 1984 (aged 25) | 1,9 m | 89 | 124 | SC Szeged |
| 28 | P | Timuzsin Schuch | 5 June 1985 (aged 24) | 1,97 m | 21 | 15 | HCM Constanța |

=== Spain ===
Head coach: Valero Rivera (ESP)

| No. | Pos. | Name | Date of birth (age) | Height | App. | Goals | Club |
|---|---|---|---|---|---|---|---|
| 1 | GK | José Javier Hombrados | 7 April 1972 (aged 37) | 1,97 m | 205 | 1 | BM Ciudad Real |
| 12 | GK | José Manuel Sierra | 21 May 1978 (aged 31) | 1,94 m | 51 | 0 | BM Valladolid |
| 16 | GK | Arpad Sterbik | 20 November 1979 (aged 30) | 2 m | 1 | 0 | BM Ciudad Real |
| 2 | LB | Alberto Entrerríos | 7 November 1976 (aged 33) | 1,92 m | 191 | 579 | BM Ciudad Real |
| 3 | RB | Eduardo Gurbindo | 8 November 1987 (aged 22) | 1,94 m | 2 | 3 | BM Torrevieja |
| 6 | P | Rubén Garabaya | 15 September 1979 (aged 30) | 2,01 m | 132 | 285 | FC Barcelona |
| 7 | P | Carlos Prieto | 2 February 1980 (aged 29) | 2,03 m | 82 | 107 | Rhein Neckar Löwen |
| 8 | RW | Víctor Tomás | 15 February 1985 (aged 24) | 1,78 m | 56 | 165 | FC Barcelona |
| 9 | LB | Raúl Entrerríos | 12 February 1981 (aged 28) | 1,95 m | 101 | 210 | BM Valladolid |
| 13 | P | Julen Aguinagalde | 8 December 1982 (aged 27) | 1,95 m | 37 | 63 | BM Ciudad Real |
| 15 | LW | Cristian Ugalde | 19 October 1987 (aged 22) | 1,87 m | 22 | 66 | FC Barcelona |
| 17 | LW | Juanín García | 28 August 1977 (aged 32) | 1,76 m | 158 | 661 | FC Barcelona |
| 18 | CB | Iker Romero | 15 June 1980 (aged 29) | 1,96 m | 154 | 573 | FC Barcelona |
| 19 | RB | Cristian Malmagro | 11 March 1983 (aged 26) | 1,97 m | 34 | 111 | SDC San Antonio |
| 20 | CB | Chema Rodríguez | 5 January 1980 (aged 30) | 1,87 m | 78 | 123 | BM Ciudad Real |
| 22 | LW | Mikel Aguirrezabalaga | 8 April 1985 (aged 24) | 1,96 m | 3 | 1 | Ademar León |
| 24 | LB | Viran Morros | 15 December 1983 (aged 26) | 1,99 m | 40 | 57 | BM Ciudad Real |
