= Lukas Frühstück =

Austrian handball player (born 1991)

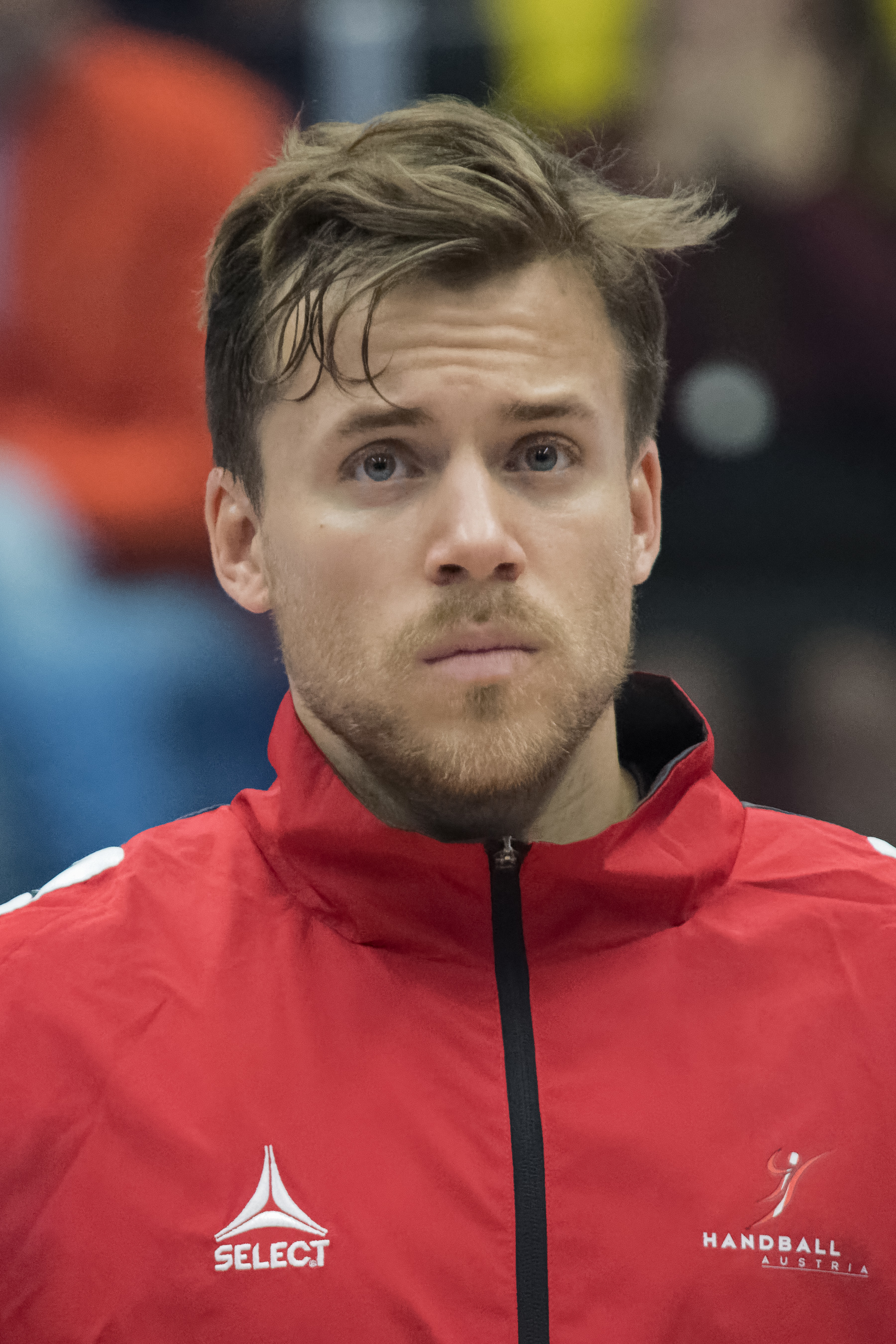
- Lukas Frühstück in 2017

Personal information
- Nationality: Austrian
- Born: 26 June 1991 (age 35) Bregenz, Austria
- Height: 185 cm (73 in)

Sport
- Sport: Handball
- Position: centre back
- Current club: Bregenz Handball
- Number: 6

Senior clubs
- Years: Team
- 2007 – 2022: Bregenz Handball
National team
Years	Team	Apps	(Gls)
2015–	Austria	16	(7)
- Updated on 14 February 2025

Lukas Frühstück (born 26 June 1991) is an Austrian Handball player for Bregenz Handball. He has played his entire career at Bregenz Handball.

== Career ==
Lukas Frühstück has been playing handball for Bregenz since his youth with Bregenz Handball.

He played with Bregenz Handball in the EHF Champions League (2007/08, 2008/09, 2009/10, 2010/11) and the EHF Cup (2009/10, 2010/11, 2011/12, 2013/14, 2014 / 15).

Since 2015, he has played in the team squad of the Austria men's national handball team, where he is coached by Patrekur Jòhannesson.

== Personal life ==
His father Roland Frühstück is an Austrian politician for the Austrian People's Party (ÖVP) and manager.

== Successes ==
- Lukas Frühstück won three times the Handball Liga Austria championship with the Bregenz Handball team and the Austrian cup once.

== HLA balance sheet ==
Season	Club	Playing class	Goals	7-Meter	Field goals
2008/09	Bregenz Handball	HLA	24	4/5	20
2009/10	Bregenz Handball	HLA	23	3/3	20
2010/11	Bregenz Handball	HLA	0	0/0	0
2011/12	Bregenz Handball	HLA	31	1/1	30
2012/13	Bregenz Handball	HLA	29	0/0	29
2013/14	Bregenz Handball	HLA	46	24/36	22
2014/15	Bregenz Handball	HLA	82	7/11	75
2015/16	Bregenz Handball	HLA	73	4/9	69
2008–2016	Total	HLA	308	43/65 (66%)	265
