= Fabian Posch =

Austrian handball player (born 1988)

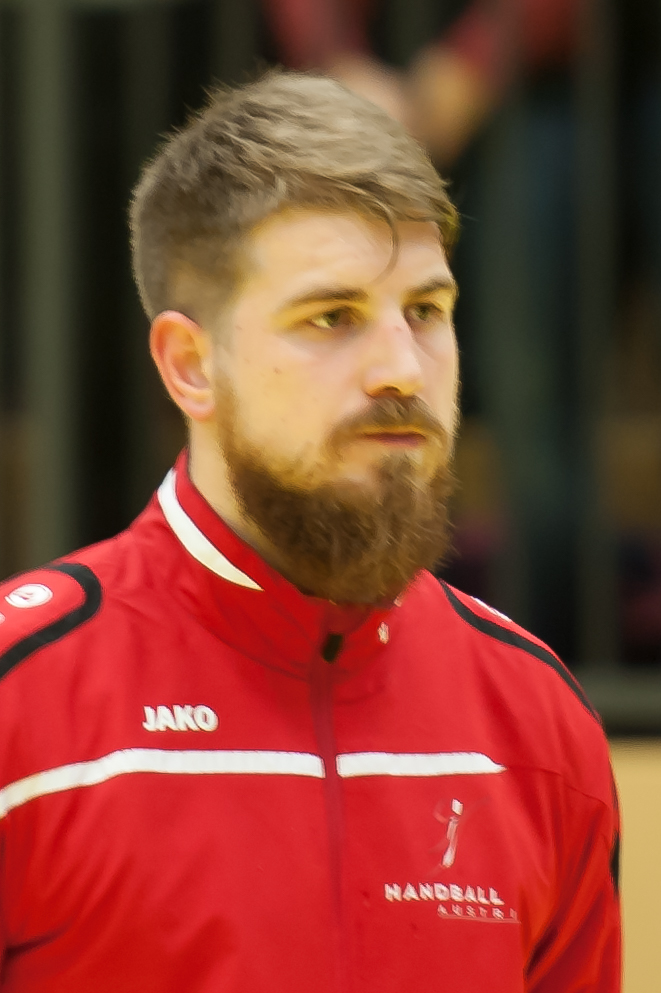

Personal information
- Nationality: Austrian
- Born: 5 January 1988 (age 38) Oberndorf bei Salzburg, Austria
- Height: 1.98 m (6 ft 6 in)

Sport
- Sport: Handball
- Position: Pivot
- Current club: Retired

Youth career
- Years: Team
- –: UHC Salzburg

Senior clubs
- Years: Team
- -2006: UHC Salzburg
- 2006-2011: Bregenz Handball
- 2011-2013: ULZ Schwaz
- 2013-2014: SC Ferlach
- 2014-2016: SG Handball West Wien
- 2016-2022: UHK Krems
- 2022-2024: Jags Vöslau
National team
Years	Team	Apps	(Gls)
2007-2024	Austria	113	(196)

Fabian Posch (born 5 January 1988) is an Austrian former handball player, who played for the Austrian national team.

== Career ==
Posch started his career at the youth team of UHC Salzburg. He started as a back player, and was reeducated as a pivot.

In 2006 he joined Bregenz Handball. Here he won the Austrian Championship four times. In the 2008–09 season he was named rookie of the season.

For the 2010–11 season he joined ULZ Schwaz.

For the 2013-14 eaon he joined the recently promoted SC Ferlach. Here he had his best season scoring wise with 137 goals, and that prompted a move to SG Handball West Wien in 2014.

After 2 years he joined UHK Krems. In the 2018-19 he won the cup and league double with Krems. The same season he was named as the player of the season.

In 2022 he joined Jags Vöslau. After the 2023–24 season he retired.

=== National team ===
With the Austrian national team Posch played at the 2025 World Men's Handball Championship, where Austria reached the round of 16. Posch played 6 games and scored 14 goals.

== Seasonal statistics ==
Season	Team	League	Goals	Penalty goals	Outfield goals
2008/09	Bregenz Handball	HLA	57	0	57
2009/10	Bregenz Handball	HLA	61	0	61
2010/11	Bregenz Handball	HLA	111	0	111
2011/12	ULZ Schwaz	HLA	88	0	88
2012/13	ULZ Schwaz	HLA	87	1	86
2013/14	SC Ferlach	HLA	137	10	127
2014/15	SG Handball West Wien	HLA	131	0/0	131
2015/16	SG Handball West Wien	HLA	65	0/0	65
2016/17	UHK Krems	HLA	167	0/0	167
2017/18	UHK Krems	HLA	172	0/0	172
2018/19	UHK Krems	HLA	142	0/0	142
2019/20	The Austrian league was cancelled due to the COVID-19 pandemic				
2020/21	UHK Krems	HLA	85	0/0	85
2008–2021	Total	HLA	1294	11	1283

== Titles ==
- Handball Liga Austria
  - Winner: 2006–07, 2007–08, 2008–09, 2009–10, 2018–19, 2021–22
- ÖHB-Cup
  - Winner: 2018–19

== Accolades ==
- HLA „Newcomer des Jahres“ 2008–09
- HLA „Handballer des Jahres“ 2018-19
