= Marian Klopcic =

Austrian handball player (born 1992)

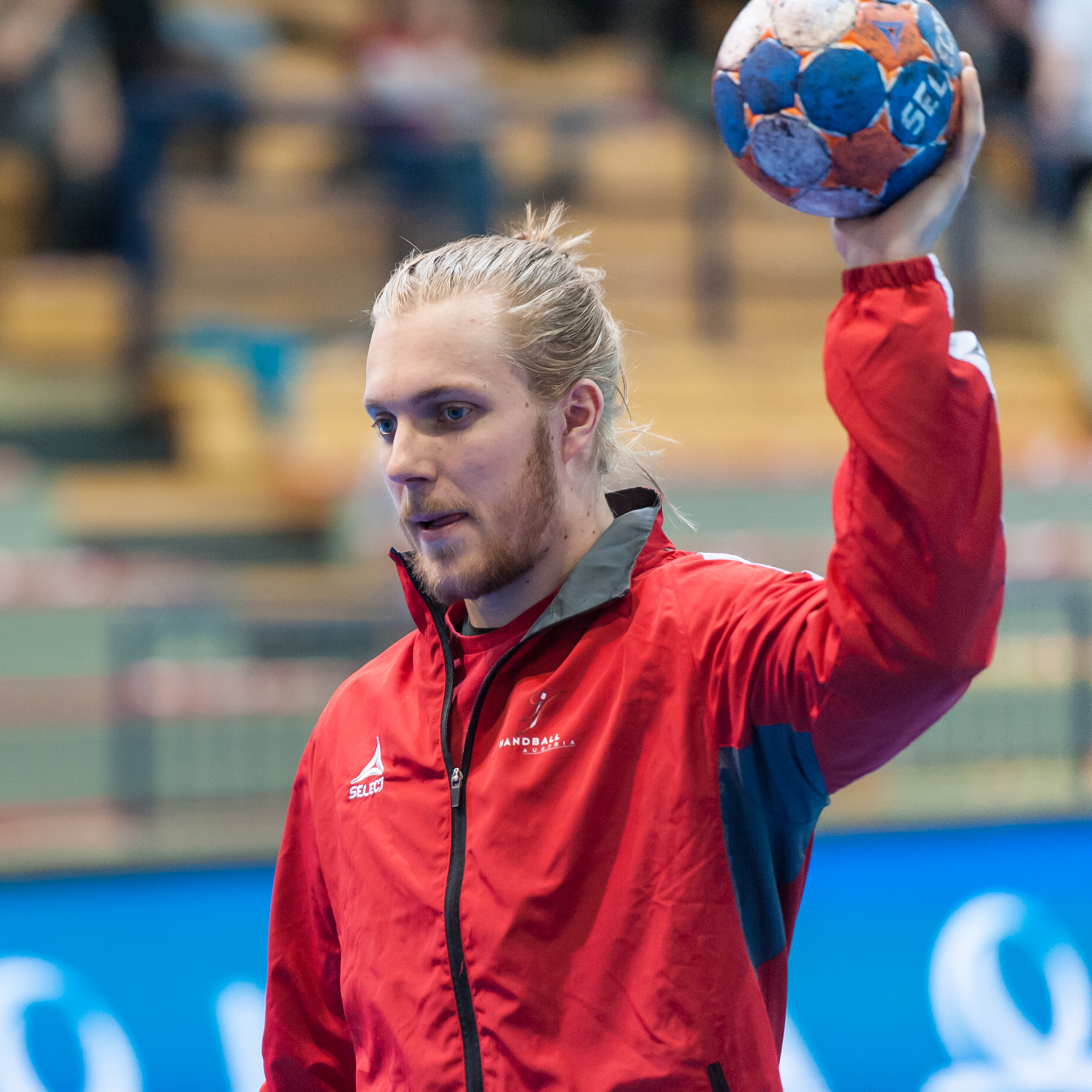

Personal information
- Nationality: Austrian
- Born: 14 January 1992 (age 34) Klagenfurt, Austria
- Height: 1.84 m (6 ft 0 in)

Sport
- Sport: Handball
- Position: Right wing
- Current club: Bregenz Handball
- Number: 15

Youth career
- Years: Team
- –2009: SC Ferlach
- 2009–2012: Bregenz Handball

Senior clubs
- Years: Team
- 2009–2023: Bregenz Handball
National team
Years	Team	Apps	(Gls)
2011–2023	Austria	51	(44)
- Updated on 14. October 2023

Marian Klopcic (born 14 January 1992) is an Austrian former handball player for Bregenz Handball and the Austrian national team. He represented Austria at the 2015 and 2019 World Men's Handball Championship.

He played his entire senior career for Bregenz Handball. He won the Austrian Championship once in 2010 and the Austrian Cup once in 2022. The same season he also won the HLA Supercup.

== Season stats ==
Season	Team	League	Goals	Penalty goals	Outfield goals
2009/10	Bregenz Handball	HLA	55	0/0	55
2010/11	Bregenz Handball	HLA	69	4/5	65
2011/12	Bregenz Handball	HLA	55	19/22	36
2012/13	Bregenz Handball	HLA	66	13/17	53
2013/14	Bregenz Handball	HLA	62	11/12	51
2014/15	Bregenz Handball	HLA	78	0/1	78
2015/16	Bregenz Handball	HLA	55	0/1	55
2016/17	Bregenz Handball	HLA	84	0/0	84
2017/18	Bregenz Handball	HLA	71	15/21	56
2018/19	Bregenz Handball	HLA	49	0/0	49
2009–2019	Total	HLA	644	62/79 (79 %)	582
