= Dominik Bammer =

Austrian handball player (born 1990)

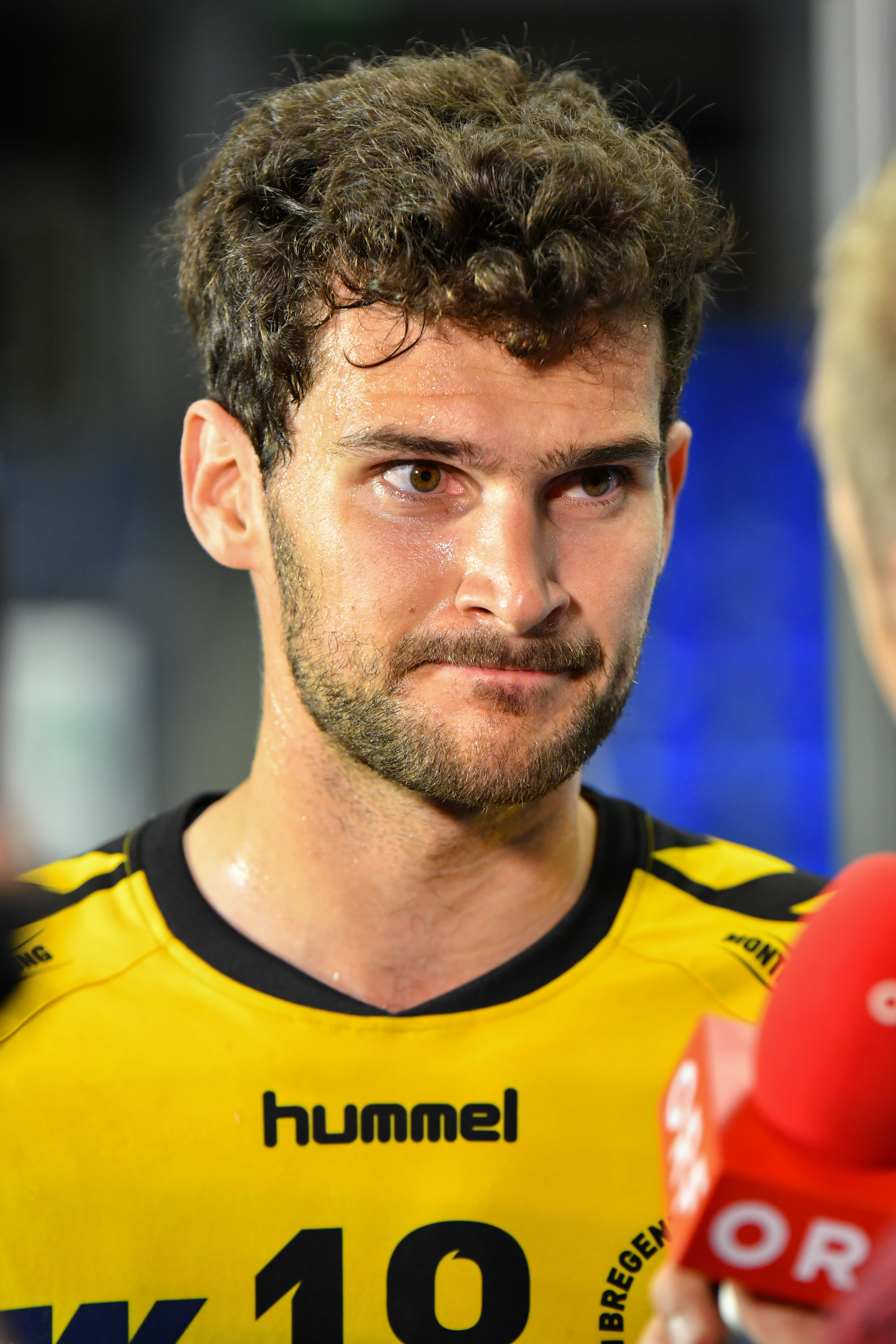

Personal information
- Nationality: Austrian
- Born: 18 January 1990 (age 36) Linz, Austria
- Height: 1.92 m (6 ft 4 in)

Sport
- Sport: Handball
- Position: Pivot
- Current club: Bregenz Handball
National team
Years	Team	Apps	(Gls)
–	Austria	1	(0)

Dominik Bammer (born 18 January 1990) is an Austrian handball player for Bregenz Handball and the Austrian national team.
