= Roland Frühstück =

Austrian politician (born 1958)

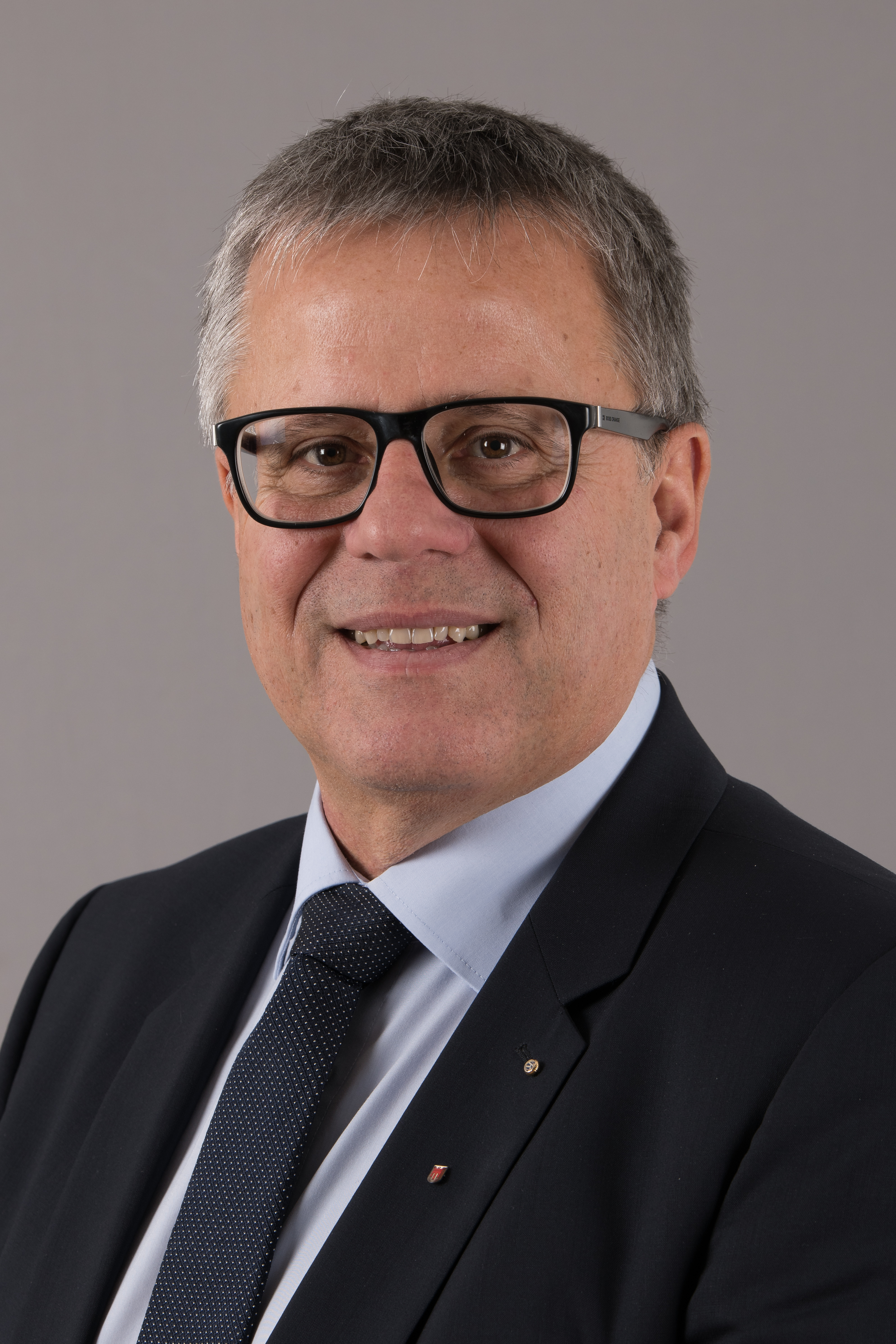
Roland Frühstück (2017)

Roland Frühstück (born 8 February 1958, in Bregenz, Austria) is an Austrian politician for the Austrian People's Party (ÖVP). Frühstück has been, since 2009, deputy to the Vorarlberg State Parliament, and is currently serving as the ÖVP representative (klubobmann) in the state parliament.

== Education and profession ==
Frühstück grew up in Vorarlberg's capital of Bregenz, where he graduated from trade school in 1972. Following his trade school, he passed his matura under the Business Academy in Bregenz. In 1979, he graduated from the Business Academy and began studying German and sports as part of a teaching degree at the University of Innsbruck. In 1984, he graduated.

Frühstück's first professional job was at the Business Academy in Schwaz, where he taught for a year before HTL Rankweil changed back to Vorarlberg. In 1993, he led a professional career back in his hometown when he began teaching at the Bregenzer Bundesgymnasium Blumenstraße. Since 1995, he has been in various management positions of the handball club Bregenz Handball. His career as a teacher ended in 2006 when he became a politician. After the trainer of Bregenz Handball was dismissed in February 2012, Frühstück took over his position as a sports director.

== Political career ==
Frühstück's political career began in 2000, when he was a part of the mayoral election in Bregenz for the ÖVP and for town council and was elected into town council. As a town councilor, he managed the department of real estate and sport from 2005. After the Vorarlberg state elections in 2009, he was a mandated substitute for then Governor Herbert Sausgruber, who was elected into the Vorarlberg Landtag. On 7 December 2011, he was chosen as the successor of the Vorarlberg state government, appointed Rainer Gögele, who ÖVP Vorarlberg branch selected for their party chairman in the parliament.

== Personal life ==
Roland Frühstück has been married since July 8, 1988 and is the father of a son and a daughter. He lives with his family in Bregenz.

His son, Lukas Frühstück, is a handball player for Bregenz Handball.

In March 2012, Roland Frühstück was arrested for driving under the influence. Both he and his political companions later described this as a serious mistake.
