= Konrad Wilczynski =

Austrian handball player (born 1982)

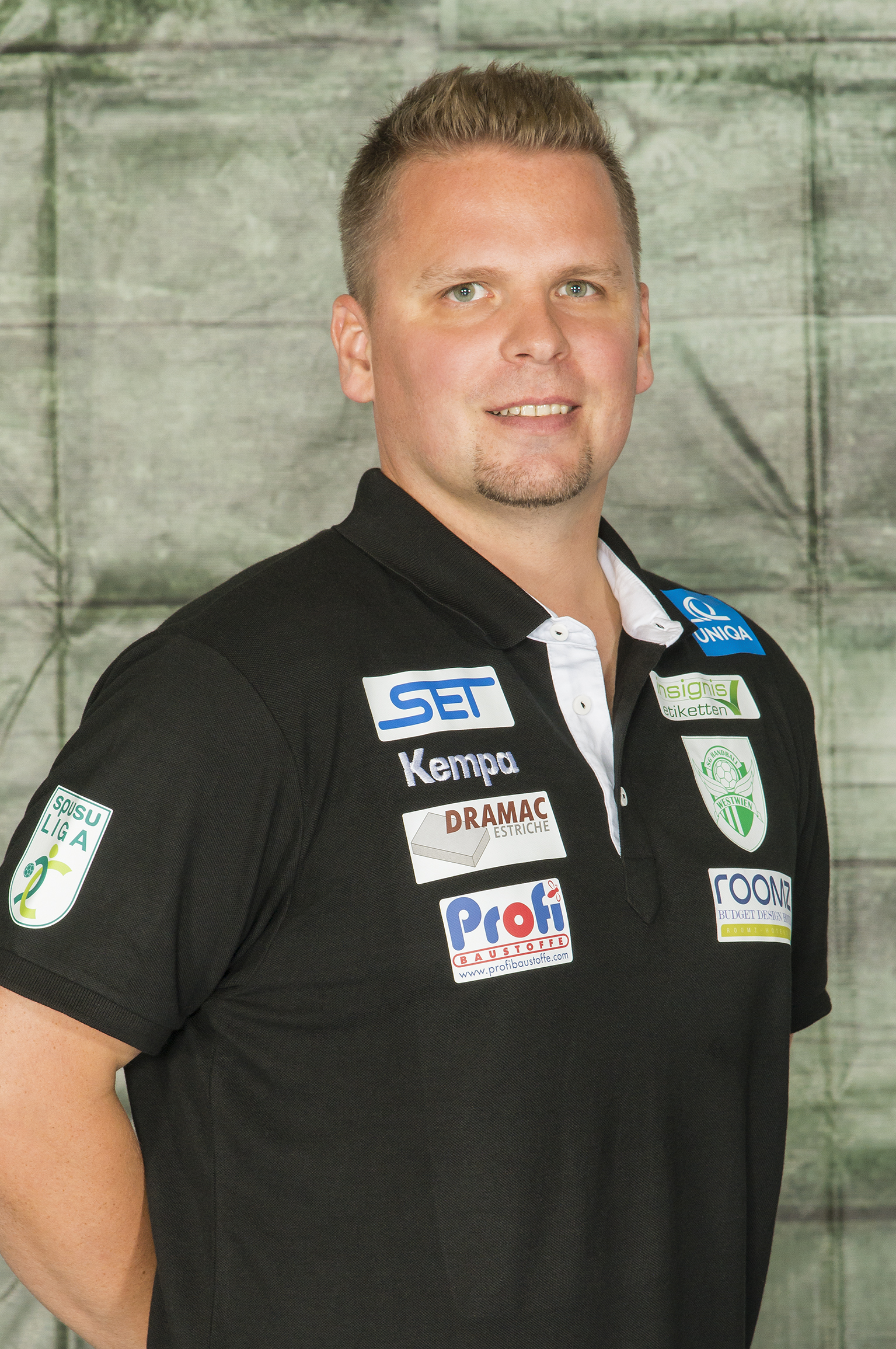
- Wilczynski in 2019

Personal information
- Nationality: Austrian
- Born: 9 February 1982 (age 44) Vienna, Austria
- Height: 1.80 m (5 ft 11 in)

Sport
- Sport: Handball
- Position: Left wing
- Current club: Retired

Youth career
- Years: Team
- –: SG Handball West Wien

Senior clubs
- Years: Team
- –2002: SG Handball West Wien
- 2002–2006: Bregenz Handball
- 2006–2011: Füchse Berlin
- 2011–2014: SG Handball West Wien
National team
Years	Team	Apps	(Gls)
–	Austria	127	(557)

Konrad Wilczynski (born 9 February 1982) is an Austrian former handball player for the Austrian national team.

== Career ==
Wilczynski started his career at SG Handball West Wien, where he played until 2002. Then he joined Bregenz Handball, where he won the Austrian Championship in 2004, 2005 and 2006 and the Cup in 2003 and 2006.

In 2006 he joined German team Füchse Berlin. In his first season at the club he helped them getting promoted to the handball-Bundesliga. In the 2007-08 he became the league top scorer with 237 goals. He left the team in 2011. He then returned to SG Handball West Wien, where he signed a 5 years contract. He retired in 2014.

He then became the sporting director at SG Handball West Wien. At the end of the 2022–23 season he had to pull the team from the Handball Liga Austria for economic reasons, and afterwards he retired from the position.
