= Michael Roth (handballer) =

German handball player (born 1962)

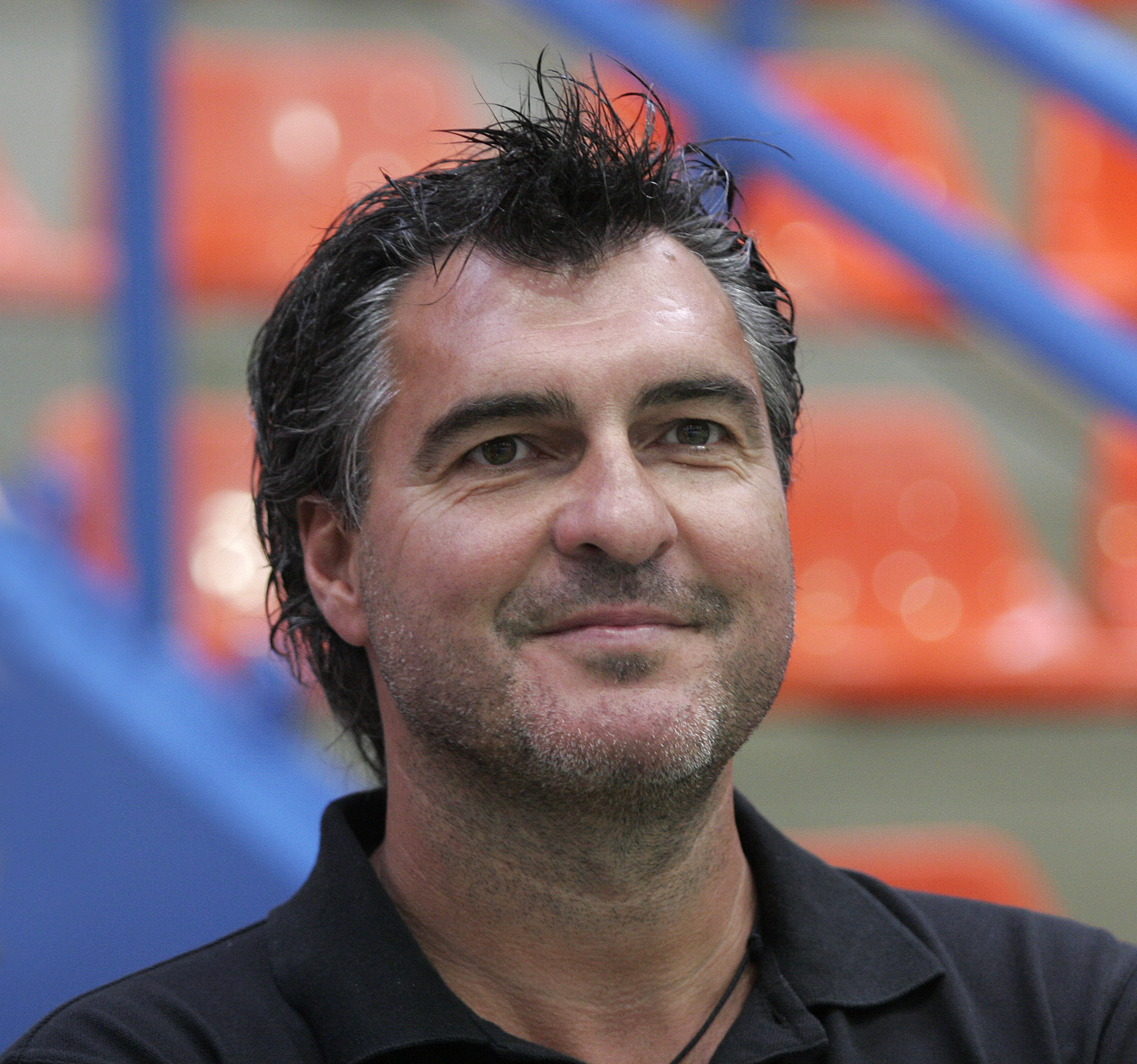
- Michael Roth in 2007

Personal information
- Nationality: German
- Born: 15 February 1962 (age 64) Heidelberg, West Germany
- Height: 1.94 m (6 ft 4 in)

Sport
- Sport: Handball
- Position: Centre back

Youth career
- Years: Team
- –: SG Leutershausen

Senior clubs
- Years: Team
- –: SG Leutershausen
- –: TuS Hofweier
- –1986: MTSV Schwabing
- 1986–1990: TV Großwallstadt
- 1990: TV Eitra
- –: TUSEM Essen
- –: TSV Östringen
National team
Years	Team	Apps	(Gls)
1984	Germany	44	(60)

Teams managed
- 1994–2002: TSV Östringen
- 2002–2004: SG Kronau-Östringen
- 2004–2009: TV Großwallstadt
- 2009–2010: HSG Wetzlar
- 2010–2018: MT Melsungen
- 2018–2019: Sydney University
- 2020: Füchse Berlin
- 2020: Bahrain
- 2022: VfL Lübeck-Schwartau
- 2022–: Bregenz Handball
Medal record
Men's handball
Representing West Germany
Olympic Games
Silver medal – second place	1984 Los Angeles	Team

Michael Roth (born 15 February 1962) is a German former handball player who competed in the 1984 Summer Olympics.

He was a member of the West German handball team which won the silver medal. He played two matches and scored two goals.

His twin brother Ulrich Roth was also a team member.

Michael Roth was the HSG Wetzlar Bundesliga team's coach in 2009.

From 1 October 2020, he will be coaching the Bahrain national team.
