= Nikola Marinovic =

Serbian-Austrian handball player (born 1976)

Nikola Marinović
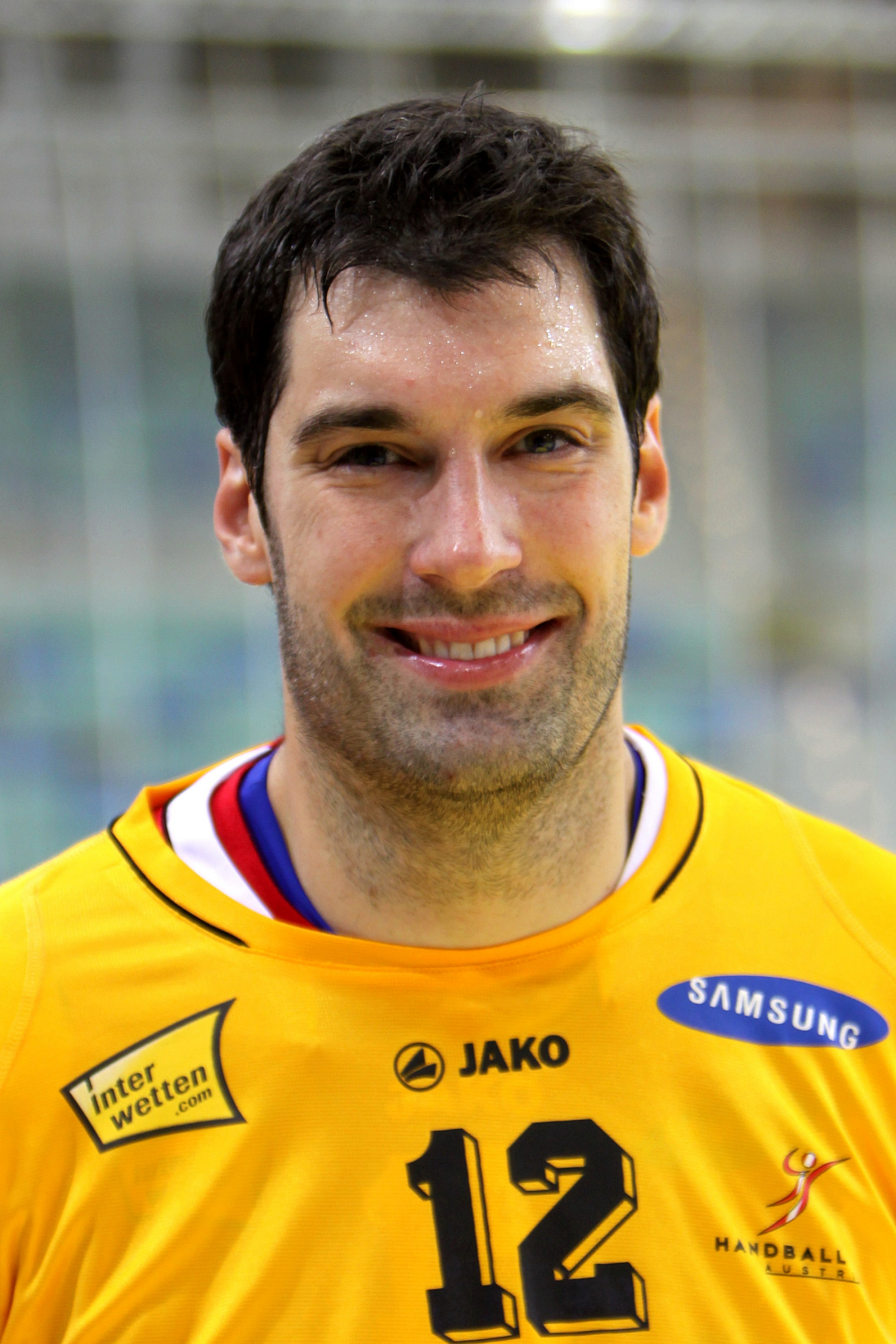
- Marinović in 2010

Personal information
- Full name: Nikola Marinović
- Nationality: Serbian / Austrian
- Born: 29 August 1976 (age 50) Belgrade, SFR Yugoslavia
- Height: 1.98 m (6 ft 6 in)

Sport
- Sport: Handball
- Position: Goalkeeper
- Current club: GC Amicitia Zürich
- Number: 76

Senior clubs
- Years: Team
- 1996–2001: Crvena zvezda
- 2001–2002: Lovćen
- 2002–2005: SG Handball West Wien
- 2005–2009: Bregenz
- 2009–2011: HBW Balingen-Weilstetten
- 2011–2013: HSG Wetzlar
- 2013–2015: Frisch Auf Göppingen
- 2015–2018: Kadetten Schaffhausen
- 2018–2022: GC Amicitia Zürich
- 2018: → HSG Wetzlar (loan)
- 2022–: HSC Kreuzlingen
National team
Years	Team	Apps	(Gls)
–	Yugoslavia	2	(0)
–	Austria	169	(0)

Nikola Marinović (Serbian Cyrillic: Никола Мариновић; born 29 August 1976) is a Serbian-Austrian handball player and handball coach.

== Club career ==
Marinović played for Crvena zvezda in the Handball Championship of FR Yugoslavia for five seasons, winning back-to-back titles in 1997 and 1998. He also spent one season with fellow Yugoslav side Lovćen, before moving abroad to Austria in 2002. Over the next seven years, Marinović played for SG Handball West Wien (2002–2005) and Bregenz (2005–2009).

== International career ==
At international level, Marinović was capped for FR Yugoslavia before switching allegiance to Austria.

Since 2022 he has been a goalkeeping coach for the Austrian national team.

== Honours ==
Crvena zvezda

- Handball Championship of FR Yugoslavia: 1996–97, 1997–98

Lovćen

- Handball Cup of FR Yugoslavia: 2001–02

Bregenz

- Handball Liga Austria: 2005–06, 2006–07, 2007–08, 2008–09

Kadetten Schaffhausen

- Swiss Handball League: 2015–16, 2016–17

Kadetten Schaffhausen

- Handball Cup of Switzerland: 2015-16
