= Lucas Mayer (handballer) =

Austrian handball player (born 1983)

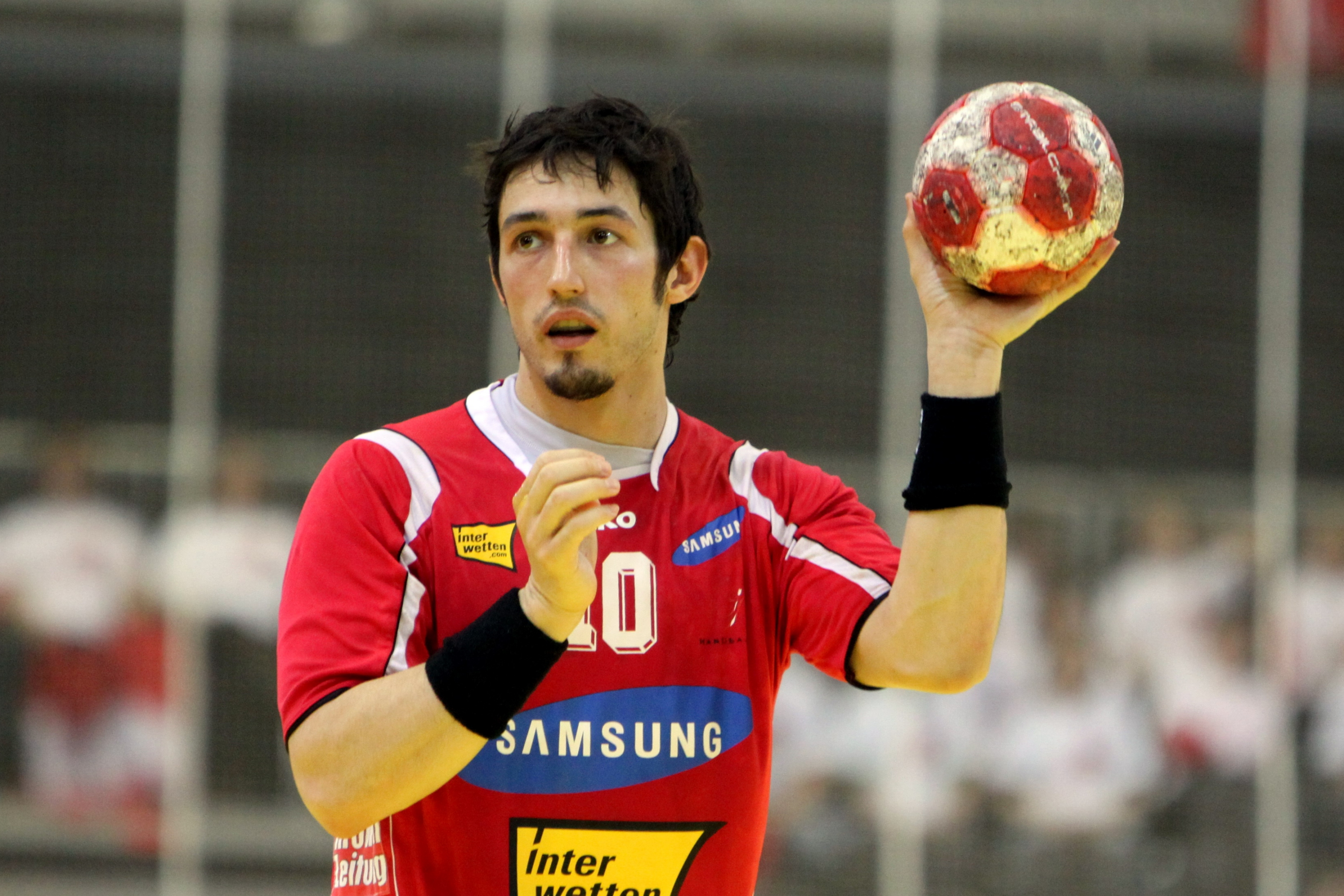

Personal information
- Nationality: Austrian
- Born: 16 February 1983 (age 43) Bregenz, Austria
- Height: 1.86 m (6 ft 1 in)

Sport
- Sport: Handball
- Position: Right back
- Current club: Bregenz Handball
- Number: 2

Youth career
- Years: Team
- 1993-2001: HCL Lustenau

Senior clubs
- Years: Team
- 2001-2006: HCL Lustenau
- 2006-2017: Bregenz Handball
National team
| Years | Team | Apps | (Gls) |
| 2008-2015 | Austria | 78 | (160) |

Lucas Mayer (born 16 February 1983) is an Austrian former handball player, who played for Bregenz Handball and the Austrian national team.
