= Markus Wagesreiter =

Austrian handball player (born 1982)

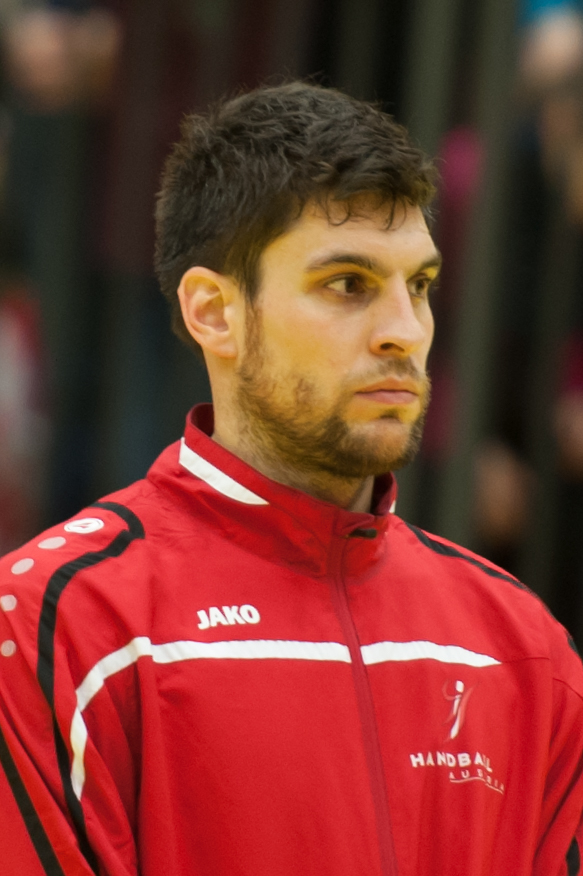

Personal information
- Nationality: Austrian
- Born: 14 January 1982 (age 44) Sankt Pölten, Austria
- Height: 1.98 m (6 ft 6 in)

Sport
- Sport: Handball
- Position: Pivot

Senior clubs
- Years: Team
- 2000-2005: UHC Tulln
- 2005-2007: Superfund Hard
- 2007-2008: Eintracht Hildesheim
- 2008-2010: HBW Balingen-Weilstetten
- 2010-2012: Bregenz Handball
- 2012-2016: SG Handball West Wien
- 2016-2018: Union St. Pölten
- 2018-2020: UHC Tulln
National team
Years	Team	Apps	(Gls)
–	Austria	143	(111)

Markus Wagesreiter (born 14 January 1982) is an Austrian former handball player who played for Austrian national team the Austrian national team. He retired in 2020.
