= Roland Schlinger =

Austrian handball player (born 1982)

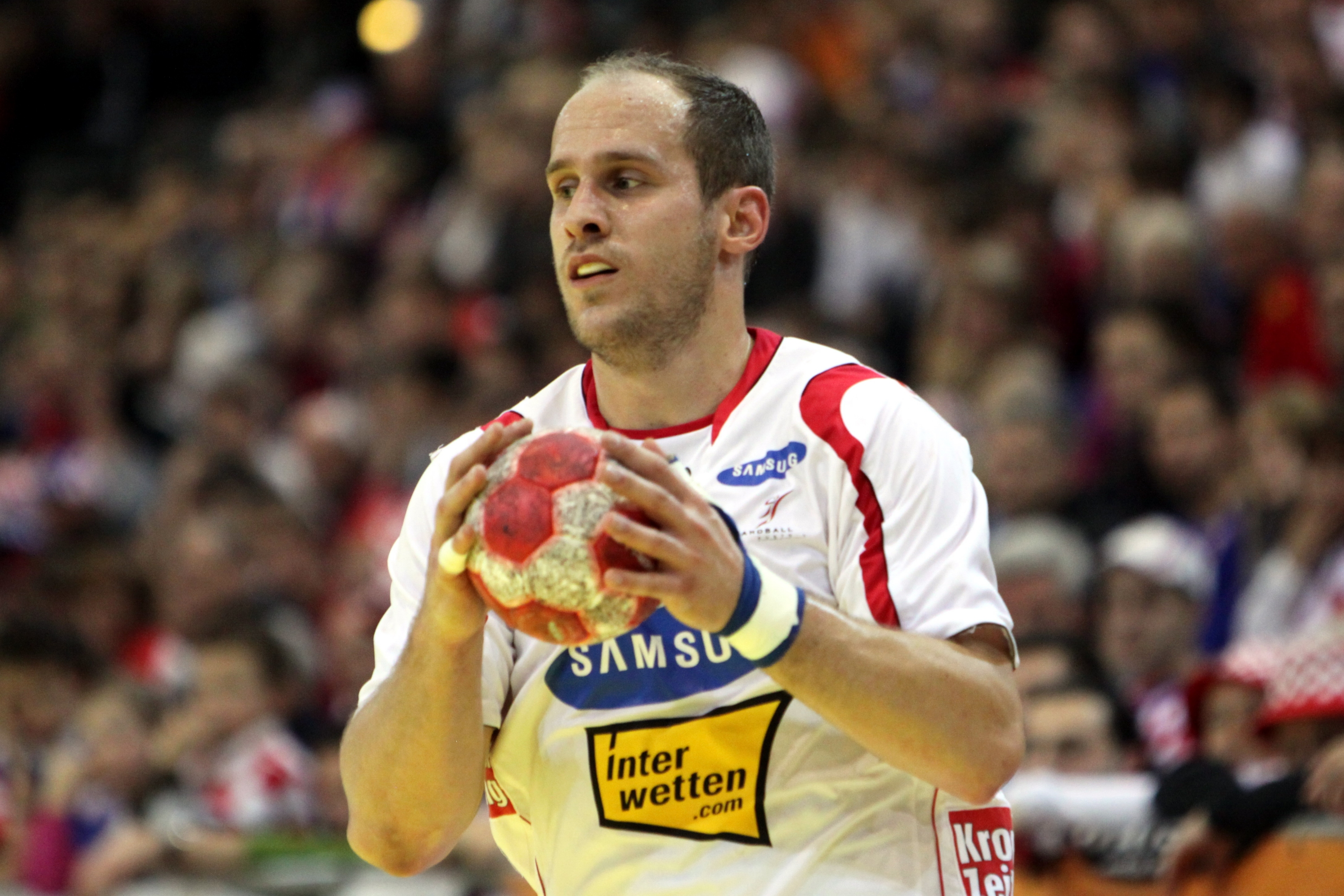

Personal information
- Nationality: Austrian
- Born: 17 September 1982 (age 44) Vienna, Austria
- Height: 1.92 m (6 ft 4 in)

Sport
- Sport: Handball
- Position: Left back

Youth career
- Years: Team
- -1998: Post SV
- 1998-2002: SG Handball West Wien

Senior clubs
- Years: Team
- 2000-2002: SG Handball West Wien
- 2002-2006: A1 Bregenz
- 2006-2007: Ademar León
- 2007-2010: A1 Bregenz
- 2010-2014: HBW Balingen-Weilstetten
- 2014-2017: Alpla HC Hard
National team
Years	Team	Apps	(Gls)
–	Austria	168	(595)

Roland Schlinger (born 17 September 1982) is an Austrian handball player for Alpla HC Hard and the Austrian national team.

He won the Austrian Championship 6 times with A1 Bregenz and twice with Alpla HC Hard.

== Titles ==
- Bregenz Handball
  - Handball Liga Austria 2003/04, 2004/05, 2005/06, 2007/08, 2008/09, 2009/10
  - ÖHB-Cup 2002/03, 2005/06
  - HLA „Handballer des Jahres“ 2005/06, 2009/10
- Alpla HC Hard
  - Handball Liga Austria 2014/15, 2016/17
