= Bregenz Handball =

Austrian handball club

- Short name: Bregenz HB
- Founded: 1946; 80 years ago
- Arena: Sporthalle Rieden-Vorkloster, Bregenz
- Capacity: 1,600
- President: Gregor Günther
- Head coach: Michael Roth
- League: Handball Liga Austria
- Club colours
| Home | Away |

Bregenz Handball is a professional handball club from Bregenz, Austria. They currently compete in the Handball Liga Austria.

Location of Bregenz Handball

== History ==
Bregenz Handball was founded in 1946 at the divisions of SC Schwarz-Weiß Bregenz. The team initially played in the German championships. In the 1995/1996 season, the team switched from the German championship to the Austrian championship. After two years in the 2nd league, in the 1996/1997 season, it was promoted to the first division with a championship title. After the handball division of SC Schwarz-Weiß Bregenz operated as an independent club for several years, the parent association was effectively separated in 1996. The growing importance of the club allowed different companies to become involved as main and name sponsors, so the club name changed often (Casino Zima Alno Bregenz, PTA Bregenz, Post Bregenz, jet2web Bregenz, A1 Bregenz). It was only in the 2012/2013 season that the club management decided that the main sponsor no longer had any influence on the name of the club. The team won the Austrian Cup in 2000. A year later, the first league title in the club's history followed. The team won the Austrian championship 9 times in total (the Austrian record) and the Austrian cup 5 times.

== Crest, colours, supporters ==
=== Kit manufacturers ===
| Period | Kit manufacturer |
|---|---|
| – 2009 | (Germany) Puma |
| 2009–2022 | (Denmark) Hummel |
| 2022 – present | (Denmark) Select Sport |

=== Kits ===
HOME
| 2008–09 | 2009–11 |

AWAY
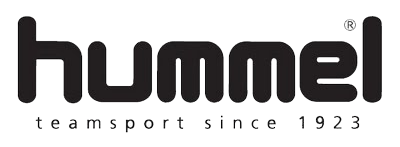
2009–10

== Sports Hall information ==
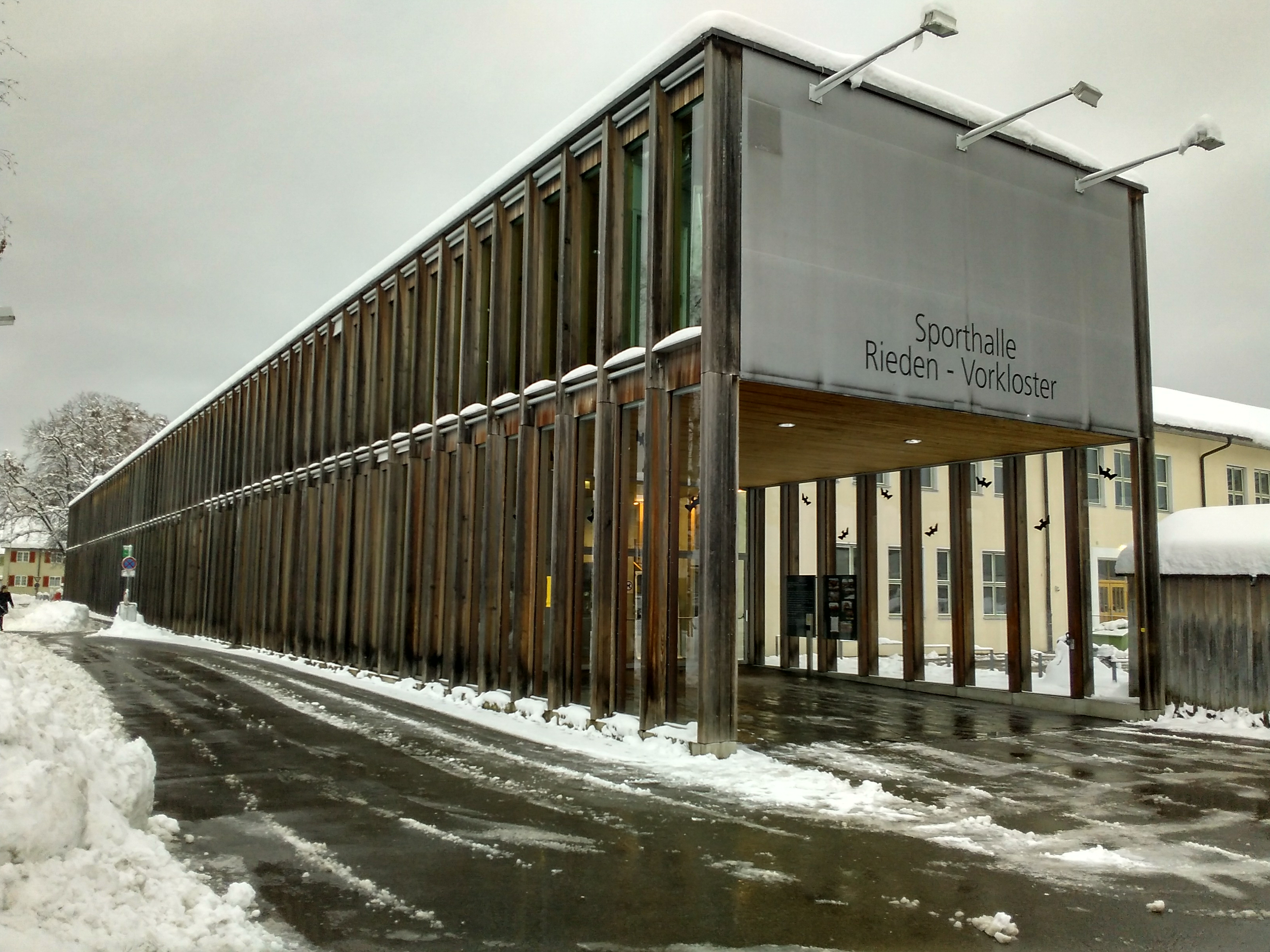
Home hall: Sporthalle Rieden-Vorkloster

- Arena: – Sporthalle Rieden-Vorkloster
- City: – Bregenz
- Capacity: – 1600
- Address: – Burggräflergasse 11, 6900 Bregenz, Austria

== Management ==
| Position | Name |
|---|---|
| President | (Austria) Gregor Günther |
| Executive Director | (Austria) Björn Tyrner |
| Member Of The Board | (Austria) Bernd Schuler |
| Member Of The Board | (Austria) Phillip Radel |
| Member Of The Board | (Austria) Michael Lipburger |
| Member Of The Board | (Austria) Rupert Manhart |

== Team ==
=== Current squad ===
Squad for the 2022–23 season

Bregenz Handball

Goalkeepers

- 16 (Austria) Ralf Patrick Häusle
- 46 (Austria) Jan Kroiss

Left Wingers

- 8 (Austria) Sebastian Burger
- 29 (Austria) Alexander Wassel

Right Wingers

- 5 (Austria) Christoph Kornexl
- 15 (Austria) Marian Klopcic
- 17 (Austria) Raphael König
- 22 (Austria) Robin Kritzinger

Line Players

- 23 (Germany) Marcel Timm
- 26 (Austria) Florian Mohr

Central Backs

- 6 (Austria) Lukas Frühstück
- 30 (Austria) Claudio Svečak
- 32 (Slovenia) Matic Kotar

Left Backs

- 11 (Germany) Matthias Brombeis
- 24 (Russia) Mikhail Vinogradov
- 57 (Austria) Dian Ramić

Right Backs

- 13 (Serbia) Uroš Mitrović

=== Technical staff ===
- Head coach: (Germany) Michael Roth
- Assistant coach: (Serbia) (Austria) Marko Tanasković
- Goalkeeping coach: (Serbia) (Austria) Goran Aleksić
- Athletic Trainer: (Austria) Johannes Sturn
- Physiotherapist: (Austria) Gerd Rainer
- Physiotherapist: (Austria) Niklas Engel
- Club Doctor: (Austria) Dr. Johannes Hartl

=== Transfers ===
Transfers for the 2026–27 season

Joining

- (Iceland) Guðmundur Bragi Ástþórsson (CB) from (Denmark) TMS Ringsted
- (Iceland) Jón Ómar Gíslason (LP) from (Iceland) Haukar Handball
- (Germany) Philipp Wäger (LB) from (Germany) Eintracht Hildesheim
- (Germany) Tyler Grömling (RB) from (Germany) DJK Rimpar

Leaving

- (Italy) Tommaso Romei (LP) to (Germany) 1. VfL Potsdam
- (Bosnia and Herzegovina) Srđan Predragović (RB)
- (Germany) Louis Mönch (CB) to (Germany) HC Oppenweiler/Backnang
- (Austria) Niklas Günther (LW)

=== Transfer History ===
Transfers for the 2025–26 season

Joining

- (Lithuania) Mindaugas Dumčius (RB) from (Germany) HC Elbflorenz
- (Italy) Tommaso Romei (LP) from (Italy) Sport Club Meran Handball
- (Germany) Louis Mönch (CB) from (Germany) TSB Heilbronn-Horkheim

Leaving

- (Slovenia) Matic Kotar (CB) to (Austria) HSG Graz
- (Austria) Markus Mahr (CB) to (Germany) 1. VfL Potsdam
- (Austria) Jan Kroiss (GK) to (Austria) BT Füchse

Transfers for the 2022–23 season

Joining

- (Austria) Raphael König (RW) from (Austria) SC Ferlach
- (Austria) Robin Kritzinger (RW) from (Austria) Alpla HC Hard
- (Austria) Sebastian Burger (LW) from (Austria) BT Füchse
- (Bosnia and Herzegovina) Dragan Pavlović (RB) from (Slovenia) RK Koper
- (Serbia) Uroš Mitrović (RB) on loan from (Poland) Wisła Płock

Leaving

- (Austria) Ante Ešegović (RB) (retires)
- (Serbia) (Austria) Goran Aleksić (GK) (retires)
- (Serbia) (Austria) Marko Tanasković (RB) (retires)
- (Austria) Marijan Rojnica (RW) to (Switzerland) SV Fides St. Gallen
- (Croatia) Marko Čorić (LP) to (Iceland) Fram Reykjavík
- (Montenegro) Luka Vukićević (RB) to (Iceland) Fram Reykjavík
- (Bosnia and Herzegovina) Dragan Pavlović (RB) to (Slovenia) RK Koper

== Previous Squads ==
2019–2020 Team
| Shirt No | Nationality | Player | Birth Date | Position |
|---|---|---|---|---|
| 1 | SerbiaAustria | Goran Aleksić | 12 September 1982 (age 44) | Goalkeeper |
| 4 | Austria | Christian Jäger | 25 August 1997 (age 29) | Right Back |
| 6 | Austria | Lukas Frühstück | 26 June 1991 (age 35) | Central Back |
| 7 | Lithuania | Povilas Babarskas | 13 December 1988 (age 37) | Left Back |
| 10 | Croatia | Marko Coric | 23 May 1996 (age 30) | Line Player |
| 11 | Germany | Matthias Brombeis | 30 August 2001 (age 25) | Left Back |
| 15 | Austria | Marian Klopcic | 14 January 1992 (age 34) | Right Winger |
| 16 | Austria | Ralf Patrick Häusle | 30 December 1994 (age 31) | Goalkeeper |
| 17 | Austria | Severin Lampert | 10 February 2000 (age 26) | Left Winger |
| 19 | Germany | Nico Schnabl | 17 April 1996 (age 30) | Central Back |
| 20 | Austria | Ante Ešegović | 12 April 1996 (age 30) | Right Back |
| 22 | Austria | Robin Kritzinger | 18 December 2001 (age 24) | Right Winger |
| 23 | Croatia | Josip Jurić-Grgić | 4 April 1995 (age 31) | Left Back |
| 26 | Austria | Florian Mohr | 30 January 1998 (age 28) | Line Player |
| 28 | Austria | Clemens Gangl | 8 October 1993 (age 33) | Line Player |
| 29 | Austria | Alexander Wassel | 30 December 1992 (age 33) | Left Winger |
| 30 | Austria | Claudio Svečak | 21 December 2001 (age 24) | Central Back |
| 32 | Austria | Kevin Radic | 20 April 1998 (age 28) | Goalkeeper |
| 57 | Austria | Dian Ramic | 28 September 2000 (age 26) | Left Back |
| 71 | North Macedonia | Vlatko Mitkov | 16 August 1981 (age 45) | Right Back |

2009–2010 Team
| Shirt No | Nationality | Player | Birth Date | Position |
|---|---|---|---|---|
| 2 | Austria | Lucas Mayer | 16 February 1983 (age 43) | Right Back |
| 4 | Austria | Lukas Frühstück | 26 June 1991 (age 35) | Central Back |
| 5 | Austria | Marian Klopcic | 14 January 1992 (age 34) | Right Winger |
| 7 | Austria | Philipp Günther | 20 March 1982 (age 44) | Left Back |
| 9 | Austria | Emanuel Sonnweber | 22 April 1990 (age 36) | Left Back |
| 10 | Austria | Roland Schlinger | 17 September 1982 (age 44) | Left Back |
| 11 | Austria | Andreas Varga | 6 February 1977 (age 49) | Central Back |
| 12 | Austria | Christopher Winkler | 8 May 1989 (age 37) | Goalkeeper |
| 13 | Austria | Matthias Günther | 11 October 1976 (age 49) | Line Player |
| 14 | Austria | Julian Rauch | 17 March 1988 (age 38) | Right Winger |
| 15 | Austria | Fabian Posch | 5 January 1988 (age 38) | Line Player |
| 17 | Austria | Gernot Watzl | 25 March 1985 (age 41) | Central Back |
| 18 | Austria | Petar Roganovic | 17 April 1989 (age 37) | Left Back |
| 19 | Austria | Björn Tyrner | 15 November 1984 (age 41) | Left Winger |
| 20 | Germany | Fabian Maier Hasselmann | 27 December 1990 (age 35) | Right Winger |
| 21 | SerbiaAustria | Goran Aleksić | 12 September 1982 (age 44) | Goalkeeper |
| 22 | Croatia | Mario Obad | 9 December 1982 (age 43) | Left Back |

2007–2008 Team
| Shirt No | Nationality | Player | Birth Date | Position |
|---|---|---|---|---|
| 1 | AustriaSerbia | Nikola Marinovic | 29 August 1976 (age 50) | Goalkeeper |
| 2 | Austria | Lucas Mayer | 16 February 1983 (age 43) | Right Back |
| 4 | Austria | Lukas Frühstück | 26 June 1991 (age 35) | Central Back |
| 5 | AustriaSlovenia | Mare Hojc | 5 January 1982 (age 44) | Central Back |
| 7 | Austria | Philipp Günther | 20 March 1982 (age 44) | Left Back |
| 8 | Austria | David Hausmann | 12 August 1987 (age 39) | Left Winger |
| 10 | Austria | Roland Schlinger | 17 September 1982 (age 44) | Left Back |
| 11 | Austria | Andreas Varga | 6 February 1977 (age 49) | Central Back |
| 12 | Austria | Johannes Winkler | 14 May 1983 (age 43) | Goalkeeper |
| 13 | Austria | Matthias Günther | 11 October 1976 (age 49) | Line Player |
| 14 | Austria | Julian Rauch | 17 March 1988 (age 38) | Right Winger |
| 15 | Austria | Fabian Posch | 5 January 1988 (age 38) | Line Player |
| 16 | Hungary | Gábor Busa | 24 September 1987 (age 39) | Goalkeeper |
| 19 | Austria | Christopher Winkler | 8 May 1989 (age 37) | Goalkeeper |
| 20 | Austria | Michael Knauth | 7 January 1983 (age 43) | Right Winger |
| 21 | Austria | Bernhard Grissmann | 2 March 1982 (age 44) | Line Player |
| 22 | Croatia | Zdravko Medic | 22 January 1973 (age 53) | Right Back |
| 24 | Croatia | Mario Obad | 9 December 1982 (age 43) | Left Back |
| 72 | Austria | Miroslav Radojicic | 3 January 1972 (age 54) | Central Back |
| 98 | Austria | Sebastian Manhart | 4 July 1975 (age 51) | Left Winger |
| 99 | Austria | Gregor Günther | 12 March 1978 (age 48) | Left Back |

== Titles ==
- Austrian Championship
  - Winner (9) : 2001, 2002, 2004, 2005, 2006, 2007, 2008, 2009, 2010
- Austrian Cup
  - Winner (5) : 2000, 2002, 2003, 2006, 2022

== EHF ranking ==
As of 5/12/2025

| Rank | Team | Points |
|---|---|---|
| 110 | (Switzerland) BSV Bern | 42 |
| 111 | (Romania) HC Buzău | 41 |
| 112 | (Azerbaijan) Kur | 40 |
| 113 | (Austria) Bregenz Handball | 40 |
| 114 | (Estonia) Mistra | 40 |
| 115 | (Luxembourg) Handball Esch | 39 |
| 116 | (France) PAUC Aix-en-Provence | 38 |

== Former club members ==
=== Notable former players ===
- (Austria) Christian Aigner (2003–2007)
- (Austria) Dominik Bammer (2014–2018)
- (Austria) Damir Djukic (2005–2007)
- (Austria) Ante Ešegović (2012–2022)
- (Austria) Lukas Frühstück (2007–)
- (Austria) Gregor Günther (1995–2011)
- (Austria) Matthias Günther (1994–2002, 2007–2012)
- (Austria) Philipp Günther (2000–2013)
- (Austria) Ralf Patrick Häusle (2008–)
- (Austria) (Slovenia) Mare Hojc (2007–2009)
- (Austria) Marian Klopcic (2009–)
- (Austria) Michael Knauth (1994–2008)
- (Austria) Sebastian Manhart (1992–2005)
- (Austria) (Serbia) Nikola Marinovic (2005–2009)
- (Austria) Lucas Mayer (2006–2017)
- (Austria) Fabian Posch (2006–2011)
- (Austria) Roland Schlinger (2002–2006, 2007–2010)
- (Austria) Björn Tyrner (2008–2011)
- (Austria) Markus Wagesreiter (2010–2012)
- (Austria) Konrad Wilczynski (2002–2006)
- (Bosnia and Herzegovina) Nikola Prce (2006–2007)
- (Croatia) Vedran Banić (2010–2012)
- (Croatia) Miro Barišić (2000–2002)
- (Croatia) Mario Bjeliš (2005–2007)
- (Croatia) Vladimir Božić (2015)
- (Croatia) Marko Buvinić (2016–2017)
- (Croatia) Filip Gavranović (2013–2015)
- (Croatia) Bruno Gudelj (1999–2003)
- (Croatia) Josip Jurić-Grgić (2018–2021)
- (Croatia) Kristijan Ljubanović (2002–2005)
- (Croatia) Mario Obad (2007–2010)
- (Germany) Holger Schneider (1998–1999)
- (Greenland) Hans Peter Motzfeldt-Kyed (1995–2001)
- (Iceland) Dagur Sigurðsson (2003–2007)
- (Lithuania) Povilas Babarskas (2012–2015, 2017–2021)
- (Lithuania) Arūnas Vaškevičius (2001–2005)
- (North Macedonia) (Croatia) Risto Arnaudovski (2011–2012)
- (North Macedonia) Vlatko Mitkov (2018–2020)
- (Montenegro) (Serbia) Draško Mrvaljević (2012–2013)
- (Norway) Espen Lie Hansen (2015–2016)
- (Russia) Mikhail Vinogradov (2021–)
- (Slovenia) Luka Kikanović (2017–2019)
- (Serbia) (Austria) Goran Aleksić (2009–2022)
- (Serbia) Bojan Beljanski (2015–2018)
- (Serbia) Nemanja Beloš (2016–2017)
- (Serbia) Ivan Dimitrijević (2013–2014)
- (Sweden) Tobias Warvne (2014–2017)
- (Ukraine) Roman Chychykalo (2017–2018)

=== Former coaches ===
| Seasons | Coach | Country |
|---|---|---|
| 1998–1999 | Holger Schneider | (Germany) |
| 1999–2003 | Bruno Gudelj | (Croatia) |
| 2003–2007 | Dagur Sigurðsson | (Iceland) |
| 2007–2008 | Zdravko Medić | (Croatia) |
| 2008–2012 | Martin Lipták | (Czech Republic) |
| 2012–2014 | Geir Sveinsson | (Iceland) |
| 2014–2017 | Robert Hedin | (Sweden) |
| 2017–2019 | Jörg Lützelberger | (Germany) |
| 2019–2022 | Markus Burger | (Austria) |
| 2022–2023 | Michael Roth | (Germany) |
| 2023–2026 | Marko Tanasković | (Austria) (Serbia) |
| 2026– | Michael Roth | (Germany) |
