= Patrick Fölser =

Austrian handball player (born 1976)

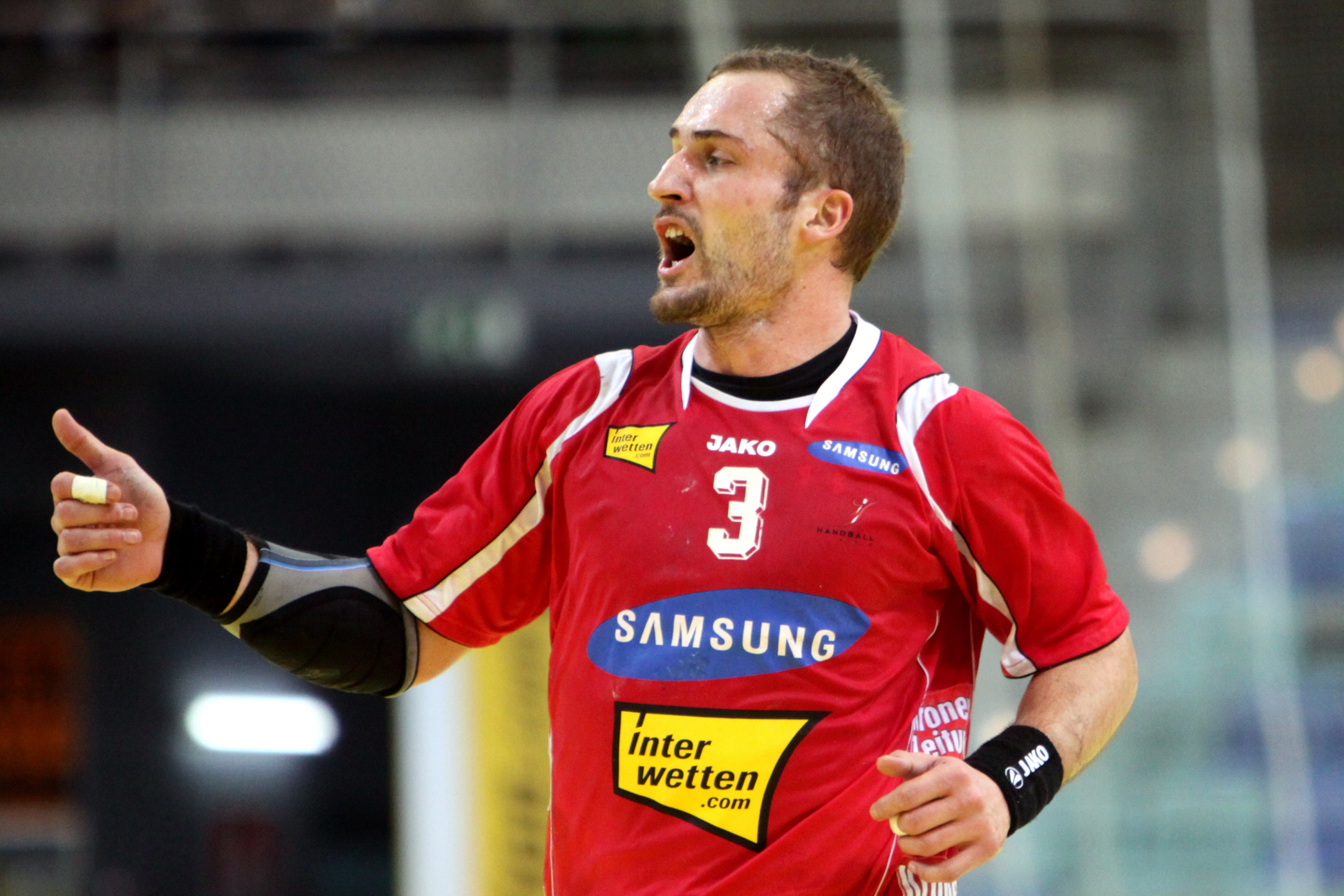

Personal information
- Nationality: Austrian
- Born: 16 November 1976 (age 49) Linz, Austria
- Height: 1.93 m (6 ft 4 in)

Sport
- Sport: Handball
- Position: Pivot
- Current club: SG Handball West Wien
National team
Years	Team	Apps	(Gls)
1996-2014	Austria	218	(567)

Patrick Fölser (born 16 November 1976) is an Austrian former handball player for SG Handball West Wien and the Austrian national team. With 218 games he is the third most capped player on the Austrian National Team, only behind Ewald Humenberger and Robert Weber.

In 2018 he became the sporting director at the Austrian Handball Association.
