= Jure Dobelšek =

Slovenian handball player

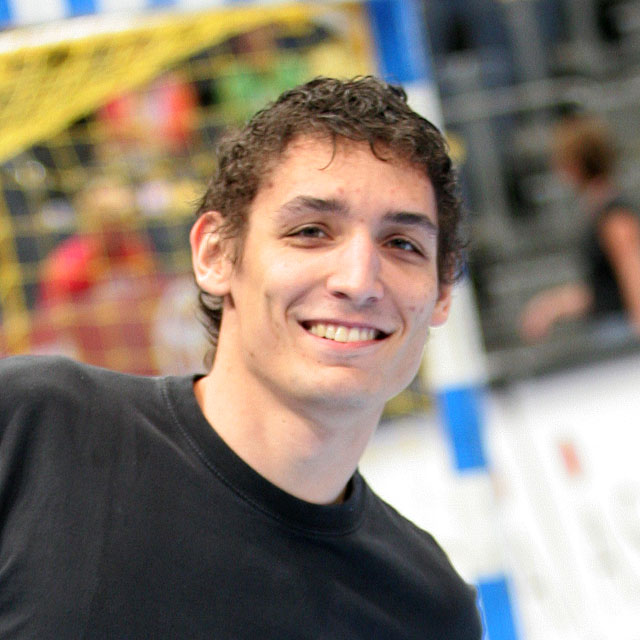
- Jure Dobelšek (2009)

Personal information
- Nationality: Slovenian
- Born: 1 April 1984 (age 42) Celje, Yugoslavia
- Height: 192 cm (76 in)

Sport
- Sport: Handball
- Position: Left wing

Youth career
- Years: Team
- 1993-2001: RK Velenje

Senior clubs
- Years: Team
- 2001-2009: RK Velenje
- 2009-2013: RK Koper
National team
Years	Team	Apps	(Gls)
200.–201.	Slovenia	89	(129)

Jure Dobelšek (born 1 April 1984 in Celje, Yugoslavia) was a Slovenian professional handball player who played for the Slovenian national team.

His brother, Luka Dobelšek, was also a professional handball player.
