= Holger Schneider =

German handball player (born 1963)

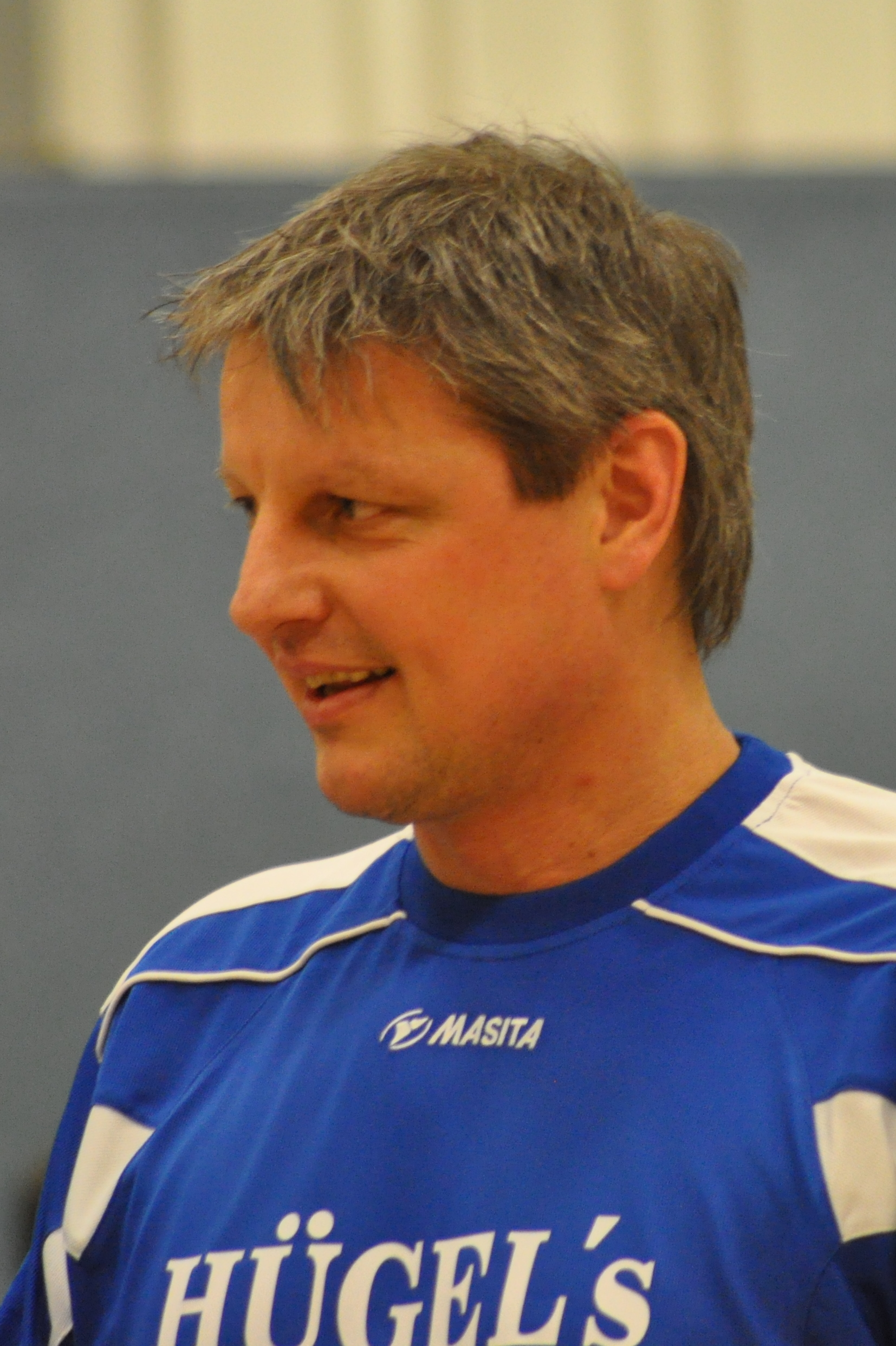

Personal information
- Nationality: German
- Born: 4 August 1963 (age 62); Güstrow, East Germany

Sport
- Sport: Handball

Holger Schneider (born 4 August 1963) is a German former handball player. He competed at the 1988 Summer Olympics representing East Germany and the 1992 Summer Olympics representing unified Germany.
