= Viktor Szilágyi =

Austrian handball player (born 1978)

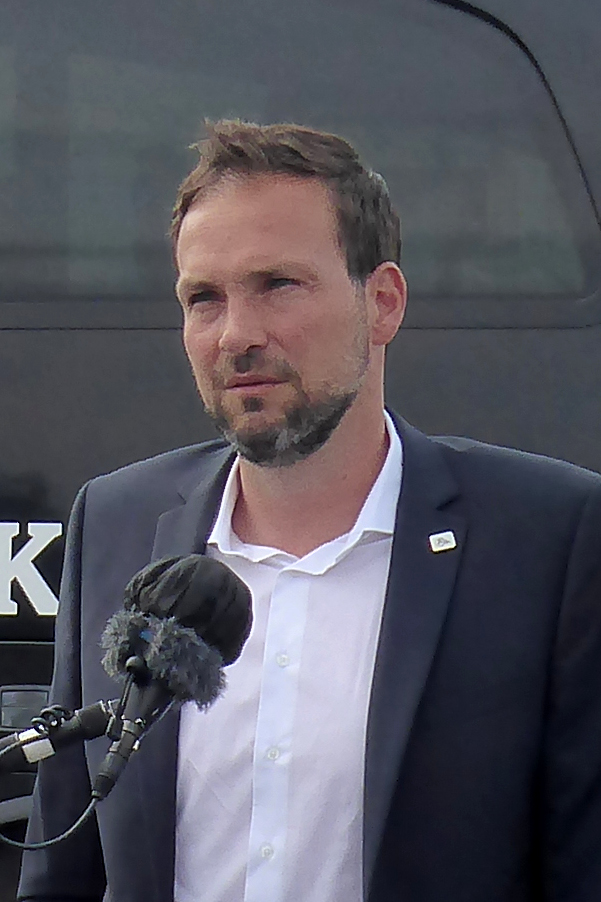

Personal information
- Nationality: Austrian, Hungarian
- Born: 16 September 1978 (age 48) Budapest, Hungary
- Height: 1.95 m (6 ft 5 in)

Sport
- Sport: Handball
- Position: Centre back
- Current club: THW Kiel
- Number: Sport director

Senior clubs
- Years: Team
- –1999: Union St. Pölten
- 1999–2000: HIT Innsbruck
- 2000–2001: TSV Bayer Dormagen
- 2001–2005: TUSEM Essen
- 2005–2008: THW Kiel
- 2008–2010: VfL Gummersbach
- 2010–2012: SG Flensburg Handewitt
- 2012–2017: Bergischer HC
National team
Years	Team	Apps	(Gls)
–	Austria	203	(907)

Viktor Szilágyi (born 16 September 1978) is a retired Hungarian-born Austrian handball player for the Austria men's national handball team. He retired from professional handball in 2017. Currently, he is the sport director at THW Kiel.

His father, István Szilágyi is a Hungarian former handball player and current coach, while his brother Zoltán Szilágyi is the head coach of Debreceni VSC.

He was 6 years old when they moved to Austria and would eventually represent the nation as a part of the Austria national youth team, and the Austria national team.
