= Bruno Gudelj =

Croatian handball player (born 1966)

Personal information
- Nationality: Croatian
- Born: 8 May 1966 (age 60) Zagreb, SR Croatia, SFR Yugoslavia
- Height: 1.92 m (6 ft 4 in)

Sport
- Sport: Handball
- Position: Center back
- Number: 7

Senior clubs
- Years: Team
- 1983-1994: Zagreb Chromos
- 1994-1996: TSG Bielefeld
- 1996-1998: TUSEM Essen
- 1998-1999: CD Bidasoa Irún
- 1999-2003: Bregenz Handball
National team
- Years: Team
- 1989-1990: Yugoslavia
- 1992–1996: Croatia

Teams managed
- 1999-2003: Bregenz Handball
- 2004-2005: RK Zagreb
- 2005-2006: HIT Innsbruck
Medal record
Men's handball
Representing Yugoslavia
Goodwill Games
Silver medal – second place	1990 Seattle	Team
Representing Croatia
Olympic Games
Gold medal – first place	1996 Atlanta	Team
European Championship
Bronze medal – third place	1994 Portugal	Team
Mediterranean Games
Gold medal – first place	1993 Languedoc-Roussillon	Team

Bruno Gudelj (born 8 May 1966) is a Croatian handball player.

He played for the Croatia men's national handball team at the 1996 Summer Olympics in Atlanta, where Croatia won the gold medal.

== Honours ==
Zagreb

- Yugoslav First League (2): 1988-89, 1990-91
- Yugoslav Second League (2): 1984-85, 1987-88
- Croatian First League (4): 1991-92, 1992-93, 1993-94, 2004-05
- Croatian Cup (3): 1992, 1993, 1994, 2005
- EHF Champions League (2): 1991-92, 1992-93
- European Super Cup (1): 1993

Bregenz Handball

- Austria Liga (2): 2000-01, 2001-02
- Austria Cup (3): 2000, 2002, 2003

=== Orders ===
- Order of Danica Hrvatska with face of Franjo Bučar - 1995
