= Handball Liga Austria =

Austrian handball league

HLA Meisterliga
- Current season, competition or edition: 2025–26 Handball Liga Austria
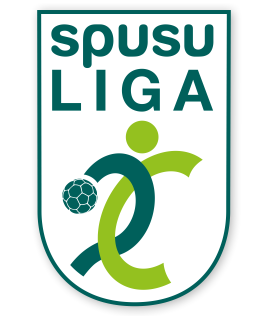
- Sport: Handball
- Founded: 1961; 65 years ago
- No. of teams: 12
- Country: Austria
- Confederation: EHF
- Most recent champion: Jags Vöslau (1) (2025–26)
- Most titles: Bregenz Handball (9 titles)
- Relegation to: HLA Challenge
- International cups: EHF Cup; EHF Challenge Cup
- Website: http://www.hla.at/

The HLA Meisterliga (Handball Liga Austria Meisterliga) is the professional handball league of Austria.

== Competition format ==
The current format was introduced in the 2025-2026 season. The competition has 12 teams. The season begins with a regular season where each team plays each other twice, home and away. The table is then separated into two parts, a championship group and a relegation group. The top eight teams meet in quarterfinals, followed by semi- and lastly a final. The winner is declared Austrian champion. The bottom four meets in relegation playoff to see who gets relegated to the HLA Challenger League.

=== Format prior to 2021-2022 ===
The leagued consisted of 10 teams, who in the regular season played each other twice, home and away. The first five teams qualify for a first playoff round, while the last five play a play-down round. At the end of this second round, the five teams of the playoff round and the top three teams of the play-down round play elimination rounds. The last two play a relegation round.

== Current teams ==
=== Teams for season 2025–26 ===
Location of teams in 2025–26 Superliga

Team	City
HC Linz AG	Linz
SC Ferlach	Ferlach
Handballclub Fivers Margareten	Wien
UHK Krems	Krems an der Donau
Jags Vöslau	Bad Vöslau
Alpla HC Hard	Hard
HSG Xentis Lipizzanerheimat	Köflach
BT Füchse	Bruck an der Mur
HSG Graz	Graz
Handball Tirol	Schwaz
Bregenz Handball	Bregenz
UHC Hollabrunn	Hollabrunn

== Handball Liga Austria past champions ==
- 1961 : ATSV Linz
- 1962 : WAT Atzgersdorf
- 1963 : Rapid Wien
- 1964 : Rapid Wien (2)
- 1965 : Rapid Wien (3)
- 1966 : Union West Wien
- 1967 : Rapid Wien (4)
- 1968 : UHC Salzburg
- 1969 : UHC Salzburg (2)
- 1970 : Union Edelweiß Linz
- 1971 : Salzburger AK 1914
- 1972 : UHC Salzburg (3)
- 1973 : Union Krems
- 1974 : Oberglas Bärnbach
- 1975 : Union Krems (2)
- 1976 : Oberglas Bärnbach (2)
- 1977 : Union Krems (3)
- 1978 : ASKÖ Linz
- 1979 : ASKÖ Linz (2)
- 1980 : ASKÖ Linz (3)
- 1981 : ASKÖ Linz (4)
- 1982 : Raika Köflach (3)
- 1983 : ATSE Waagner Biro Graz
- 1984 : ATSE Waagner Biro Graz (2)
- 1985 : ATSE Waagner Biro Graz (3)
- 1986 : Union Raika Stockerau
- 1987 : ATSE Waagner Biro Graz (4)
- 1988 : ATSE Waagner Biro Graz (5)
- 1989 : UHK Volksbank Wien (2)
- 1990 : ATSE Waagner Biro Graz (6)
- 1991 : UHK Volksbank Wien (3)
- 1992 : UHK Volksbank Wien (4)
- 1993 : UHK Volksbank Wien (5)
- 1994 : ASKÖ Linz (5)
- 1995 : ASKÖ Linz (6)
- 1996 : ASKÖ Linz (7)
- 1997 : HC Sparkasse Bruck
- 1998 : HC Sparkasse Bruck (2)
- 1999 : HSG Raiff. Bärnbach/Köflach (4)
- 2000 : HSG Raiff. Bärnbach/Köflach (5)
- 2001 : jet2web Bregenz
- 2002 : jet2web Bregenz (2)
- 2003 : Alpla HC Hard
- 2004 : A1 Bregenz (3)
- 2005 : A1 Bregenz (4)
- 2006 : A1 Bregenz (5)
- 2007 : A1 Bregenz (6)
- 2008 : A1 Bregenz (7)
- 2009 : A1 Bregenz (8)
- 2010 : A1 Bregenz (9)
- 2011 : HC Fivers Margareten
- 2012 : Alpla HC Hard (2)
- 2013 : Alpla HC Hard (3)
- 2014 : Alpla HC Hard (4)
- 2015 : Alpla HC Hard (5)
- 2016 : HC Fivers Margareten (2)
- 2017 : Alpla HC Hard (6)
- 2018 : HC Fivers Margareten (3)
- 2019 : UHK Krems (4)
- 2020 : No Champion (COVID-19 pandemic)
- 2021 : Alpla HC Hard (7)
- 2022 : UHK Krems (5)
- 2023 : SG Handball West Wien (6)
- 2024 : HC Linz AG (7)
- 2025 : UHK Krems (6)
- 2026 : Jags Vöslau (1)

	Club	Titles	Year
1.	Bregenz Handball	9	2001, 2002, 2004, 2005, 2006, 2007, 2008, 2009, 2010
2.	HC Linz AG	8	1978, 1979, 1980, 1981, 1994, 1995, 1996, 2024
3.	Alpla HC Hard	7	2003, 2012, 2013, 2014, 2015, 2017, 2021
4.	ATSE Waagner Biro Graz	6	1983, 1984, 1985, 1987, 1988, 1990
5.	SG Handball West Wien	5	1966, 1989, 1991, 1992, 1993, 2023
6.	HSG Raiffeisen Bärnbach/Köflach	5	1974, 1976, 1983, 1999, 2000
7.	UHK Krems	5	1973, 1975, 1977, 2019, 2022
8.	Rapid Wien	4	1963, 1964, 1965, 1967
9.	UHC Salzburg	3	1968, 1969, 1972
10.	HC Fivers Margareten	3	2011, 2016, 2018
11.	HC Bruck	2	1997, 1998
12.	ATSV Linz	1	1961
13.	WAT Atzgersdorf	1	1962
14.	Union Edelweiß Linz	1	1970
15.	Salzburger AK 1914	1	1971
16.	Union Raika Stockerau	1	1986

== EHF coefficient ranking ==
For season 2017–2018, see footnote

- 23. (32) (Netherlands) Lotto Eredivisie (10.78)
- 24. (20) (Turkey) Süper Ligi (9.67)
- 25. (26) Handball Liga Austria (9.00)
- 26. (23) (Greece) A1 Ethniki (8.00)
- 27. (36) (Iceland) Olís deildin (7.00)
