= Austria men's national handball team =

Handball team

Austria

Information
- Association: Austrian Handball Federation
- Coach: Iker Romero
- Assistant coach: Erwin Gierlinger; Nikola Marinovic
- Most caps: Ewald Humenberger (246)
- Most goals: Andreas Dittert (1089)

Colours
1st	2nd

Results

Summer Olympics
- Appearances: 1 (First in 1936)
- Best result: (silver) (1936)

World Championship
- Appearances: 8 (First in 1938)
- Best result: (silver) (1938)

European Championship
- Appearances: 7 (First in 2010)
- Best result: 8th (2020)
- Last updated on Unknown.

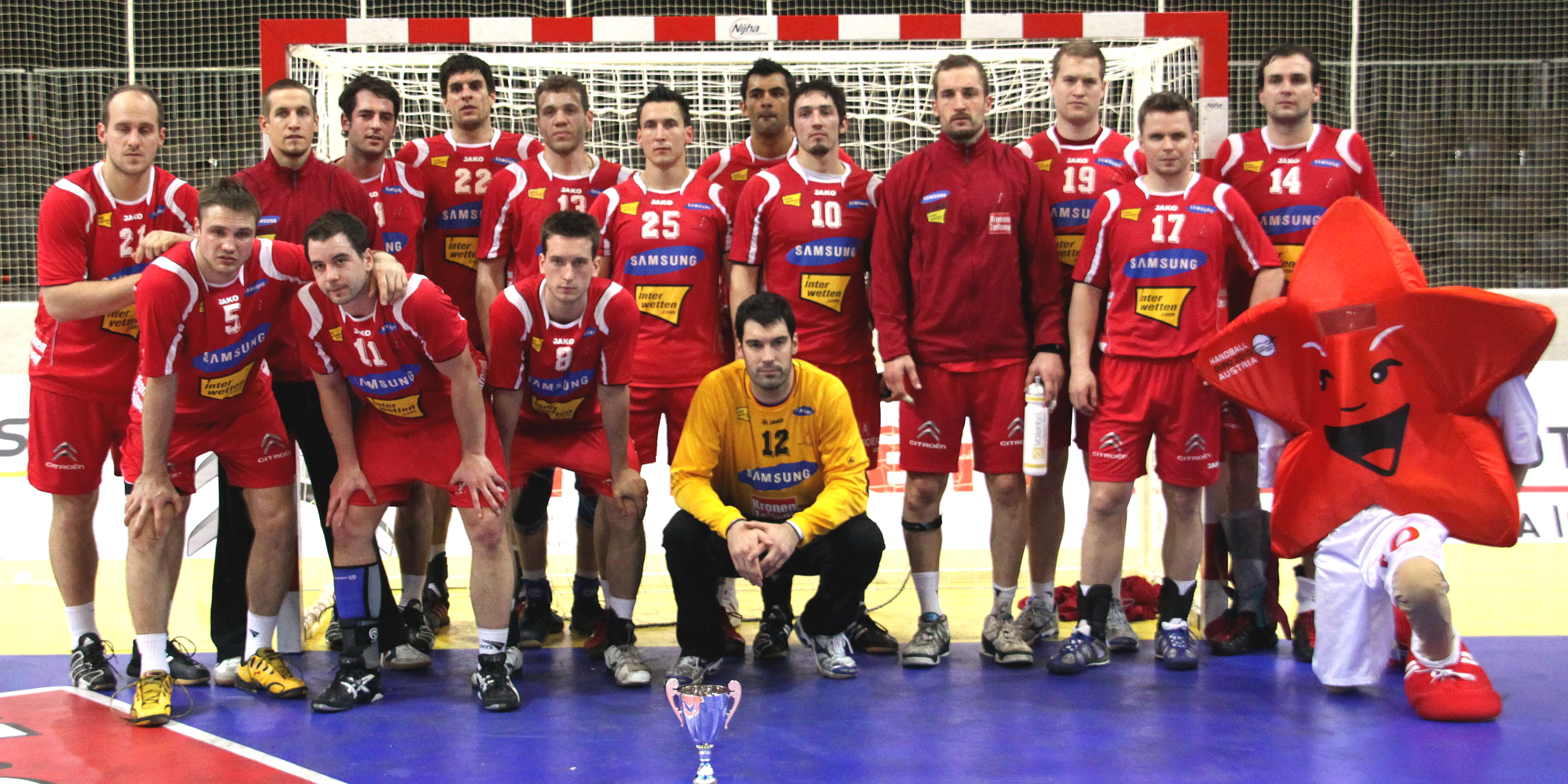
Austria national handball team 2010-01-09

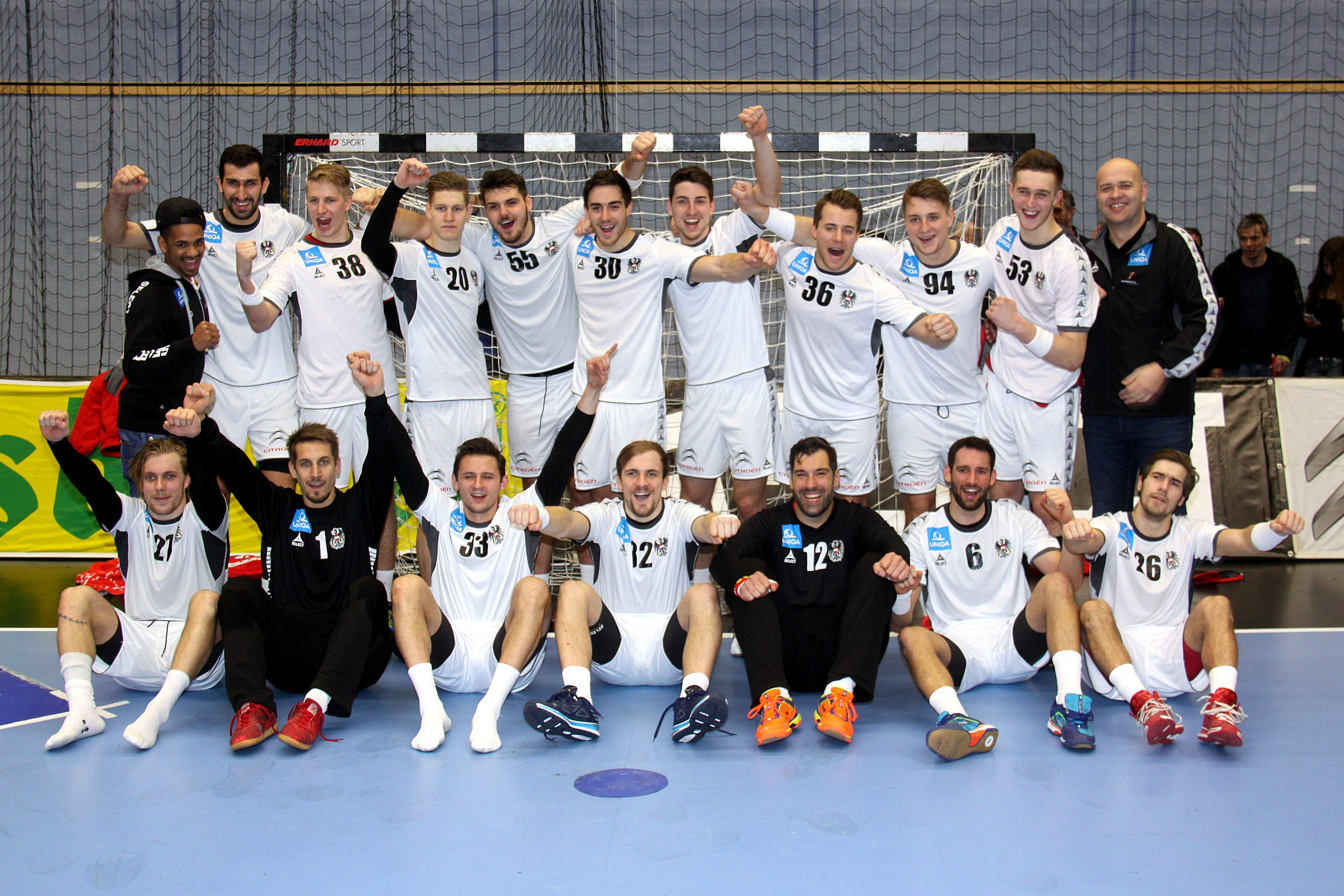
Austria national handball team 2016-01-17

The Austria national handball team is the national handball team of Austria.

== Competitive record ==
=== Olympic Games ===
Olympic record
Games	Round	Position	Pld	W	D	L	GF	GA
(Germany) 1936 Berlin	Runners-up	2nd of 6	5	4	0	1	60	29
Not held from 1948 to 1968
(West Germany) 1972 Munich	did not qualify							
(Canada) 1976 Montreal	did not qualify							
(Soviet Union) 1980 Moscow	did not qualify							
(United States) 1984 Los Angeles	did not qualify							
(South Korea) 1988 Seoul	did not qualify							
(Spain) 1992 Barcelona	did not qualify							
(United States) 1996 Atlanta	did not qualify							
(Australia) 2000 Sydney	did not qualify							
(Greece) 2004 Athens	did not qualify							
(China) 2008 Beijing	did not qualify							
(United Kingdom) 2012 London	did not qualify							
(Brazil) 2016 Rio de Janeiro	did not qualify							
(Japan) 2020 Tokyo	did not qualify							
(France) 2024 Paris	did not qualify							
Total	1/15	–	5	4	0	1	60	29

=== World Championship ===
World Championship record
Year	Round	Position	GP	W	D	L	GS	GA
(Nazi Germany) 1938	Runners-up	2	3	2	0	1	16	11
(Sweden) 1954	did not qualify							
(East Germany) 1958	Preliminary round	9	3	1	0	2	50	69
(West Germany) 1961	did not qualify							
(Czechoslovakia) 1964	did not qualify							
(Sweden) 1967	did not qualify							
(France) 1970	did not qualify							
(East Germany) 1974	did not qualify							
(Denmark) 1978	did not qualify							
(West Germany) 1982	did not qualify							
(Switzerland) 1986	did not qualify							
(Czechoslovakia) 1990	did not qualify							
(Sweden) 1993	Preliminary round	14	6	3	1	2	147	138
(Iceland) 1995	did not qualify							
(Japan) 1997	did not qualify							
(Egypt) 1999	did not qualify							
(France) 2001	did not qualify							
(Portugal) 2003	did not qualify							
(Tunisia) 2005	did not qualify							
(Germany) 2007	did not qualify							
(Croatia) 2009	did not qualify							
(Sweden) 2011	17/18th place	18	7	2	0	5	205	212
(Spain) 2013	did not qualify							
(Qatar) 2015	Round of 16	13	6	2	1	3	174	169
(France) 2017	did not qualify							
(Denmark) / (Germany) 2019	Presidents' Cup	19	7	2	0	5	172	199
(Egypt) 2021	Presidents' Cup	26	7	3	0	4	220	220
(Poland) (Sweden) 2023	did not qualify							
(Croatia) (Denmark) (Norway) 2025	Main round	17	6	2	2	2	184	182
(Germany) 2027	did not qualify							
(France) (Germany) 2029	TBD							
(Denmark) (Iceland) (Norway) 2031	TBD							
Total	8/32	–	45	17	4	24	1168	1200

=== European Championship ===
European Championship record
Year	Round	Position	GP	W	D	L	GS	GA
(Portugal) 1994	did not qualify							
(Spain) 1996	did not qualify							
(Italy) 1998	did not qualify							
(Croatia) 2000	did not qualify							
(Sweden) 2002	did not qualify							
(Slovenia) 2004	did not qualify							
(Switzerland) 2006	did not qualify							
(Norway) 2008	did not qualify							
(Austria) 2010	Main Round	9	6	2	1	3	184	187
(Serbia) 2012	did not qualify							
(Denmark) 2014	Main Round	11	6	2	0	4	159	160
(Poland) 2016	did not qualify							
(Croatia) 2018	Group stage	15	3	0	0	3	80	99
(Austria) (Norway) (Sweden) 2020	Main round	8	7	3	1	3	205	214
(Hungary) (Slovakia) 2022	Preliminary round	20	3	0	0	3	86	99
(Germany) 2024	Main round	8	7	2	3	2	196	195
(Denmark) (Norway) (Sweden) 2026	Main round	16	3	1	0	2	78	85
(Portugal) (Spain) (Switzerland) 2028	To be determined							
(Czech Republic) (Denmark) (Poland) 2030	To be determined							
(France) (Germany) 2032	To be determined							
Total	7/20	–	35	10	5	20	988	1039

* Colored background indicates that medal was won on the tournament.
** Red border color indicates that tournament was held on home soil.

== Team ==
=== Current squad ===
Squad for the 2026 European Men's Handball Championship.

Head coach: Iker Romero

No.	Pos.	Name	Date of birth (age)	Height	App.	Goals	Club
6	LB	Markus Mahr	3 November 2000 (age 26)	1.89 m	35	36	(Germany) 1. VfL Potsdam
7	RB	Janko Božović	14 July 1985 (age 41)	2.04 m	203	576	(Kuwait) Sulaibikhat SC
18	P	Emanuel Petrusic	26 June 2001 (age 25)	1.93 m	4	0	(Austria) Handball Tirol
19	RW	Nils Moser	2 June 2005 (age 21)	1.90 m	3	2	(Austria) HC Linz AG
20	LW	Sebastian Frimmel	18 December 1995 (age 30)	1.90 m	129	473	(Hungary) SC Pick Szeged
23	LB	Nemanja Beloš	8 June 1994 (age 32)	1.92 m	27	48	(Austria) HSG Graz
26	P	Lukas Herburger	19 December 1994 (age 31)	1.97 m	92	90	(Germany) Füchse Berlin
30	RB	Boris Zivkovic	2 May 1992 (age 34)	1.95 m	86	167	(France) C' Chartres Métropole Handball
45	LW	Eric Damböck	6 September 1999 (age 27)	1.81 m	53	69	(Germany) TV Emsdetten
51	GK	Leon Bergmann	17 April 2004 (age 22)	1.96 m	13	1	(Switzerland) Kadetten Schaffhausen
53	LB	Mykola Bilyk	28 November 1996 (age 29)	1.98 m	116	523	(Germany) THW Kiel
55	P	Tobias Wagner	26 March 1995 (age 31)	1.98 m	124	370	(France) Limoges Handball
57	RW	Jakob Nigg	6 May 2003 (age 23)	1.84 m	36	55	(Germany) TVB Stuttgart
66	CB	Elias Kofler	9 August 2000 (age 26)	1.87 m	41	24	(Germany) HSV Hamburg
72	CB	Lukas Hutecek	2 July 2000 (age 26)	1.89 m	73	254	(Germany) TBV Lemgo
97	RB	Michael Miskovez	29 August 1997 (age 29)	1.97 m	51	10	(Austria) Handball Tirol
98	GK	Constantin Möstl	1 April 2000 (age 26)	1.86 m	48	0	(Germany) TBV Lemgo

=== Player statistics ===
==== Most capped players ====
#	Player	Games
1	Ewald Humenberger	246
2	Robert Weber	228
3	Patrick Fölser	218
4	Andreas Dittert	203
4	Viktor Szilágyi	203
6	Janko Božović	190
7	Nikola Marinović	169
8	Roland Schlinger	168
9	Thomas Bauer	165
10	Stefan Higatzberger	163

==== Top scorers ====
#	Player	Goals	Games	Average
1	Andreas Dittert	1089	203	5,4
2	Robert Weber	990	228	4,3
3	Viktor Szilágyi	907	203	4,5
4	David Szlezak	667	157	4,2
5	Roland Schlinger	595	168	3,5
6	Konrad Wilczynski	578	136	4,3
7	Patrick Fölser	567	218	2,6
8	Janko Božović	531	190	2,8
9	Nikola Bilyk	498	110	4,5
10	Michael Gangel	459	150	3,1
