= Liga ASOBAL 1993–94 =

Liga ASOBAL
- Season: 1993–94
- Champions: Teka
- Relegated: Arrate
- Top goalscorer: (Czech Republic) Václav Lanča (210 goals)

Liga ASOBAL 1993–94 season was the fourth since its establishment. The league was played in a two phases. In the first phase, a total of 16 teams were separate in two groups of eight teams. The first four of every groups passed to the second phase for the title. The last four passed to the second phase for the permanence in Liga ASOBAL.

== First phase ==
=== Group A ===
	Team	P	W	D	L	G+	G−	Dif	Pts
1	Granollers	14	12	0	2	369	302	67	24
2	Juventud Alcalá	14	7	3	4	333	324	9	17
3	Puleva Maristas	14	8	0	6	383	356	27	16
4	Avidesa Alzira	14	8	0	6	337	320	17	16
5	CajaPontevedra	14	7	1	6	312	320	–8	15
6	Valladolid	14	7	1	6	350	341	9	15
7	Ciudad Real	14	4	1	9	316	361	–45	9
8	Academia Octavio	14	0	0	14	296	372	–76	0

Second Round (title)
Second Round (permanence)

=== Group B ===
	Team	P	W	D	L	G+	G−	Dif	Pts
1	Barcelona	14	13	1	0	355	289	66	27
2	Elgorriaga Bidasoa	14	11	0	3	343	316	27	22
3	Teka	14	8	3	3	370	324	46	19
4	Cadagua Gáldar	14	7	3	4	380	369	11	17
5	Conquense	14	4	3	7	318	334	–16	11
6	Atl. Madrid Alcobendas	14	3	3	8	336	342	–6	9
7	Arrate	14	2	0	12	295	362	–67	4
8	Guadalajara	14	1	1	12	304	365	–61	3

Second Round (title)
Second Round (permanence)

== Second phase ==
=== Group I ===
	Team	P	W	D	L	G+	G−	Dif	Pts
1	Barcelona	14	11	2	1	341	289	52	24
2	Teka	14	7	2	5	332	319	13	16
3	Juventud Alcalá	14	7	2	5	342	348	–6	16
4	Granollers	14	7	1	6	327	337	–10	15
5	Elgorriaga Bidasoa	14	6	2	6	331	328	3	14
6	Avidesa Alzira	14	6	1	7	310	331	–21	13
7	Cadagua Gáldar	14	4	2	8	394	404	–10	10
8	Puleva Maristas	14	2	0	12	343	364	–21	4

EHF Champions League
EHF Cup Winners' Cup
EHF Cup
EHF City Cup

=== Championship playoffs ===
quarter-finals
1	Barcelona	27	26	_
8	Puleva Maristas	27	22	_
4	Granollers	21	22	18
5	Elgorriaga Bidasoa	19	25	21
2	Teka	23	37	_
7	Cadagua Gáldar	22	23	_
3	Juventud Alcalá	29	27	_
6	Avidesa Alzira	32	30	_

semi-finals
1	Barcelona	18	24	_
5	Elgorriaga Bidasoa	19	25	_
2	Teka	28	22	27
6	Avidesa Alzira	22	26	24

final
5	Elgorriaga Bidasoa	20	16	24	22
2	Teka	22	23	19	23

1993–94 Liga ASOBAL winners
(Cantabria)
Teka
Second title

=== Group II ===
	Team	P	W	D	L	G+	G−	Dif	Pts
9	CajaPontevedra	20	13	1	6	463	436	27	27
10	Conquense	20	12	2	6	467	434	33	26
11	Ciudad Real	20	12	1	7	498	452	46	25
12	Valladolid	20	11	3	6	487	444	43	25
13	Atl. Madrid Alcobendas	20	7	4	9	491	488	3	18
14	Guadalajara	20	6	3	11	408	468	–60	15
15	Arrate	20	6	2	12	464	499	–35	14
16	Academia Octavio	20	4	2	14	423	480	–57	10

In–Out promotion
Relegated

=== In–Out promotion ===
==== 1st leg ====
May 7, 1994	Guadalajara	27–18	Ademar E. Tello

May 7, 1994	Atl. Madrid Alcobendas	23–12	Anaitasuna

==== 2nd leg ====
May 14, 1994	Ademar E. Tello	23–26	Guadalajara

May 14, 1994	Anaitasuna	20–24	Atl. Madrid Alcobendas

- Guadalajara & Atl. Madrid Alcobendas remained in Liga ASOBAL.
- Later, Atl. Madrid Alcobendas was dissolved and Academia Octavio maintained its seat.

== Top goal scorers ==
Player	Goals	Team
(Czechoslovakia) Václav Lanča	210	BM. Guadalajara
(Russia) Valery Gopin	151	Puleva Maristas
(Federal Republic of Yugoslavia) Nedeljko Jovanović	123	Elgorriaga Bidasoa
(Spain) Juan Francisco Alemany	119	Avidesa Alzira
(Spain) Alfredo Mayoral	118	Conquense
(Spain) Antonio Ortega	110	Puleva Maristas
(Ukraine) Serhiy Bebeshko	105	Ciudad Real
(Federal Republic of Yugoslavia) Zoran Tomić	101	Valladolid
(Federal Republic of Yugoslavia) Dalibor Brajdić	99	Academia Octavio
(Poland) Bogdan Wenta	96	Barcelona
