= Manuel Montoya =

Spanish handball manager (1959–2024)

Personal information
- Full name: Manuel Montoya Fernández
- Nationality: Spanish
- Born: 18 October 1959 Barcelona, Spain
- Died: 2 September 2024 (aged 64)

Sport
- Sport: Handball

Teams managed
- Years: Team
- 1992–1997: BM Granollers
- 1997–1998: Pilotes Posada Academia Octavio
- 1998–2000: Handbol Adrianenc
- 2002–2007: BM Granollers
- 2004–2010: Catalonia
- 2010–2013: Spain (assistant manager)
- 2013–2018: Qatar (assistant manager)
- 2018–2019: Romania
- 2021–2022: Iran

Manuel Montoya Fernández (18 October 1959 – 2 September 2024) was a Spanish handball coach and manager for both the Romanian and Iranian national teams.

Montoya started at the Col·legi Pare Manyanet in Barcelona. He had a PhD in Physical Activity and Sport Sciences and was a professor at the INEFc University in Barcelona.

On 14 September 2018, he signed a two-year contract to coach the Romania national team, replacing Xavier Pascual Fuertes who previously resigned. In August 2019, he was dismissed as coach of Romania and replaced by Rareş Fortuneanu. On 20 July 2021, he signed a contract to coach the Iran national team. He coached the Iran team until 2 February 2022 when he quit as their manager.

Montoya died on 2 September 2024, at the age of 64.

== International honours ==
=== Manager ===
Granollers

- EHF Cup:
  - Winner: 1995, 1996

=== Assistant Manager ===
Qatar

2014 Asian Men's Handball Championship

Winner

2016 Asian Men's Handball Championship

Winner

2018 Asian Men's Handball Championship

Winner

2015 World Men's Handball Championship

Runners-Up

Assistant manager

Spain
2013 World Men's Handball Championship
Winner
