= Carlos Viver =

Spanish handball player and coach (born 1973)

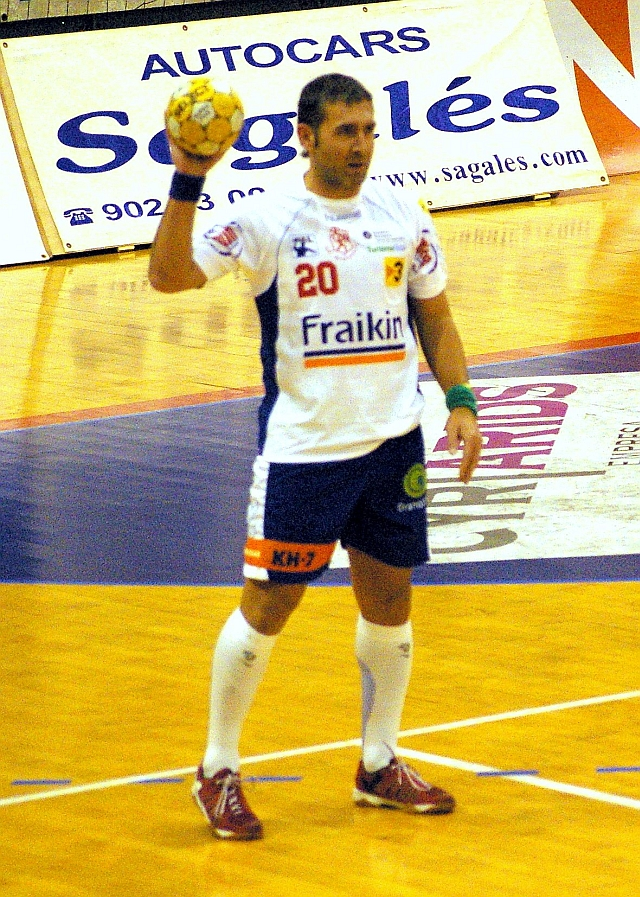
- Viver in 2007

Personal information
- Full name: Carlos Viver Arza
- Nationality: Spanish
- Born: 24 April 1973 (age 53) Granollers, Spain

Sport
- Sport: Handball

Senior clubs
- Years: Team
- 1991–1999: BM Granollers
- 1999–2000: SD Teucro
- 2000–2008: BM Granollers
National team
Years	Team	Apps
–	Spain	6

Teams managed
- –2014: BM Granollers (W)
- 2014–2017: BM Granollers
- 2017–2021: Spain (W)
- 11/2020–3/2023: Rapid București
- 1/2024–: Angola (W)
- 2025–: CS Gloria Bistrița
Medal record
World Championship
Silver medal – second place	2019 Japan
Mediterranean Games
Gold medal – first place	2018 Tarragona	Team

Carlos Viver (born 24 April 1973) is a Spanish former handball player and current head coach of the Angolan women's national team.

On 23 February 2017, he replaced Jorge Dueñas as head coach of Spain national team.

== Trophies ==
=== Player ===
Granollers

- EHF Cup: 1994–1995, 1995–1996
- Copa ASOBAL: 1994

=== Manager ===
Spain (w)

- Mediterranean Games: 2018
