= Aitor Etxaburu =

Spanish handball player (born 1966)

Personal information
- Full name: Aitor Iñaki Etxaburu Castro
- Born: 17 June 1966 (age 60) Eibar, Spain
- Height: 194 cm (76 in)

Sport
- Sport: Handball
- Position: Pivot

Senior clubs
- Years: Team
- 1983-1986: JD Arrate
- 1986-1989: FC Barcelona
- 1989-1991: CB Cantabria Santander
- 1991-1993: BM Granollers
- 1993-2001: Bidasoa Irún
National team
Years	Team	Apps	(Gls)
1989-?	Spain	87	(162)

Teams managed
- 2001-2010: Bidasoa Irún
- 2010-2014: Helvetia Anaitasuna
- 2014-2015: BM Bera Bera
- 2015-2018: Billère HB
- 2018-: Bidasoa Irún 2
- 9/2022-: Chile
Medal record
Men's handball
Representing Spain
Olympic Games
Bronze medal – third place	1996 Atlanta	Team

Aitor Iñaki Etxaburu Castro (born 17 June 1966) is a Spanish handball player and coach. He is currently the coach of Chile's national team.

== Playing career ==
Etxaburu started his career at JD Arrate, where he played until 1986, where he at the age of 20 joined FC Barcelona. Here he won the 1988 and 1989 Liga ASOBAL, the 1988 Copa del Rey, the 1986 and 1988 Supercopa ASOBAL and the 1987, 1988 and 1989 Catalan Championship.

After three years he joined CB Cantabria Santander, where he won the 1990 EHF Cup Winners' Cup and the 1991 Copa ASOBAL. In 1991 he joined BM Granollers.

From 1991 until his retirement in 2001 he played for Bidasoa Irún. Here he won the 1995 Liga ASOBAL and 1994-95 EHF Champions League, the 1995 Supercopa ASOBAL, the 1996 Copa del Rey and the 1997 EHF Cup Winners' Cup. In 1996 he reached the final of the Champions League again, where he lost to his former club FC Barcelona.

=== National team ===
With the Spanish youth team he won silver medals at the 1987 Junior World Championship.

He made his debut for the Spanish senior team on 4 January 1989 against Switzerland.

In 1991 he won the Super Cup with Spain.

A year later he was a member of the Spanish handball team which finished fifth in the Olympic tournament. He played all six matches and scored six goals.

At the 1994 European Championship he scored 18 goals in 6 games, when Spain finished 5th.

At the 1996 Olympics he won the bronze medal with the Spanish team. He played five matches and scored eight goals.

== Coaching career ==
After his retirement as a player he became the coach of his former club Bidasoa Irun. In the 2006–07 season he was relegated with the team.

In 2010 he became the head coach of the second league team Helvetia Anaitasuna.

In 2014 he became the head coach of the women's team BM Bera Bera. Here he won the Spanish Championship and the Supercup in his only season at the club.

He then became the head coach of the French second-tier team Billère HB. In 2016 he managed to get them promoted to the top league.

Since 2018 he has been a coach at the Bidasoa second team.

In 2022 he became the head coach of the Chile's national team, replacing Mateo Garralda. He coached the team at the 2023 World Championship, where they finished 26th.
