= Viudes =

Viudes or Viudès is a surname. Notable people with the surname include:

- Cyril Viudes (born 1982), French handballer
- Isabel Viudes (born 1944), Argentine politician
- Luc Viudès (born 1956), French shot putter
