= David Nilsson =

David Nilsson may refer to:

- Dave Nilsson (born 1969), Australian baseball player
- David Nilsson (runner) (born 1987), Swedish long-distance runner
- David Mitov Nilsson (born 1991), Swedish-Macedonian footballer

== See also ==
- Dawid Nilsson (born 1977), Polish handball player
