= Oleg Kiselyov =

Russian handball player

Personal information
- Full name: Oleg Viktorovich Kiselyov
- Nationality: Russian
- Born: 11 January 1967 (age 59) Yaroslavl, USSR
- Height: 199 cm (78 in)

Sport
- Sport: Handball
- Position: Centre back / left back
- Current club: Retired

Senior clubs
- Years: Team
- 1984–1992: Dynamo Astrakhan
- 1992–1994: BM Granollers
- 1994–1996: Bidasoa Irun
- 1996–1997: CB Cantabria
- 1997–2004: Portland San Antonio
National team
- Years: Team
- –1992: Soviet Union
- 1992: Unified team
- 1992–: Russia

Teams managed
- 2007–2008: BM Lagunak
Medal record
Men's handball
Representing Soviet Union
World Championships
Silver medal – second place	1990 Czechoslovakia	Team
Representing the Unified Team
Olympic Games
Gold medal – first place	1992 Barcelona	Team
Representing Russia
World Championships
Gold medal – first place	1993 Sweden	Team
European Championships
Gold medal – first place	1996 Spain	Team
Silver medal – second place	1994 Portugal	Team

Oleg Viktorovich Kiselyov (Russian: Олег Викторович Киселёв; born 11 January 1967 in Yaroslavl) is a Russian handball player. He is a World Champion from 1993 with Russia and a Olympic Champion with the Unified Team from the 1992 Summer Olympics in Barcelona. He played for the Russia men's national handball team at the 1996 Summer Olympics in Atlanta, where Russia finished 5th.

== Career ==
Kiselyov started his handball career at Dynamo Astrakhan in 1984. Here he won the 1990 Soviet Men's Handball Championship in 1990, and finished 2nd in the 1988-89 and 1990-91 seasons.

In 1992 he joined the Spanish team BM Granollers. Here he won the 1994 Copa ASOBAL. Afterwards he joined Bidasoa Irun. Here he won the 1994-95 EHF Champions League, the 1995-96 Spanish Supercup and Spanish Cup.

Then he moved to CB Cantabria. In 1997 he joined Portland San Antonio, where he played until 2004, where he retired. With San Antonio he won the 1999 Spanish Cup, the 1999-2000 EHF Cup Winners' Cup and the 2000-01 EHF Champions League.

In the 2007-08 season he was the head coach for the Spanish second tier side BM Lagunak.

== Private ==
His two sons Jaroslav (born 1991) and Oleg (born 1997) are also handball players. Oleg has played matches for the Spanish youth national teams.
