= 1993–94 EHF Cup =

The 1993–94 season of the EHF Cup was the 13th edition of the tournament. It was won by BM Alzira in a final match against ASKÖ Linz.

== First round ==
Team #1	Agg.	Team #2	1st leg	2nd leg
IFK Skövde (Sweden)	41–38	(Latvia) HK Dia Riga	19–18	22–20
Steaua Bucharest (Romania)	56–34	(Luxembourg) HC Berchem Roeser	29–19	27–15
ASKÖ Linde Linz (Austria)	56–30	(Turkey) Beşiktaş JK	24–9	32–21
CSKA Moscow (Russia)	48–28	(Italy) Ortigia Siracusa	27–16	21–12
CB Alzira (Spain)	50–41	(Czech Republic) HC Dukla Prague	31–20	19–21
Montpellier HB (France)	68–35	(Georgia (country)) HB Mamuli Tbilisi	35–17	33–18
CD Elgorriaga Bidasoa Irún (Spain)	38–35	(Switzerland) Kadetten Schaffhausen	22–18	16–17
CF Os Belenenses (Portugal)	34–58	(Hungary) Elektromos Budapest	18–29	16–29
Virum-Sorgenfri HK (Denmark)	40–42	(Iceland) Íþróttafélag Reykjavíkur	21–19	19–23
Sporting Neerpelt (Belgium)	35–35	(Croatia) HC Sisak	17–22	18–13
AEL Limassol (Cyprus)	(walkover)	(Estonia) Viimsi Tallinn	–	–
Philippos Veria H.C. (Greece)	41–44	(Ukraine) SKA Kyiv	22–21	19–23
Tutunski-Kombinat Prilep (North Macedonia)	38–41	(Slovenia) Andor Jadran Kozina	22–21	16–20
HAKA/E&O (Netherlands)	45–46	(Slovakia) ŠKP Bratislava	21–23	24–23
Urædd Porsgrunn (Norway)	42–57	(Poland) Petrochemia Płock	24–23	18–34

== Eighth-finals ==
Team #1	Agg.	Team #2	1st leg	2nd leg
ŠKP Bratislava (Slovakia)	47–52	(Romania) Steaua Bucharest	25–22	22–30
AEL Limassol (Cyprus)	(walkover)	(Austria) ASKÖ Linde Linz	–	–
Petrochemia Płock (Poland)	48–46	(Sweden) IFK Skövde	26–22	22–24
Andor Jadran Kozina (Slovenia)	43–64	(Germany) SV Niederwürzbach	22–25	21–39
Íþróttafélag Reykjavíkur (Iceland)	30–51	(Spain) CD Elgorriaga Bidasoa Irún	11–28	19–23
HC Sisak (Croatia)	37–61	(Spain) CB Alzira	20–30	17–31
Elektromos Budapest (Hungary)	37–34	(France) Montpellier HB	19–17	18–17
SKA Kyiv (Ukraine)	38–37	(Russia) CSKA Moscow	21–16	17–21

== Quarter-finals ==
Team #1	Agg.	Team #2	1st leg	2nd leg
Elektromos Budapest (Hungary)	42–46	(Austria) ASKÖ Linde Linz	23–22	19–24
SKA Kyiv (Ukraine)	38–51	(Romania) Steaua Bucharest	23–23	15–28
Petrochemia Płock (Poland)	48–52	(Spain) CB Alzira	24–22	24–30
CD Elgorriaga Bidasoa Irún (Spain)	51–43	(Germany) SV Niederwürzbach	25–20	26–23

== Semi-finals ==
Team #1	Agg.	Team #2	1st leg	2nd leg
Steaua Bucharest (Romania)	44–59	(Austria) ASKÖ Linde Linz	23–38	21–21
Elgorriaga Bidasoa Irún (Spain)	38–44	(Spain) CB Alzira	18–18	20–26

== Final ==
Team #1	Agg.	Team #2	1st leg	2nd leg
CB Alzira (Spain)	44–41	(Austria) ASKÖ Linde Linz	23–19	21–22
