= Jaume Fort =

Spanish handball player (born 1966)

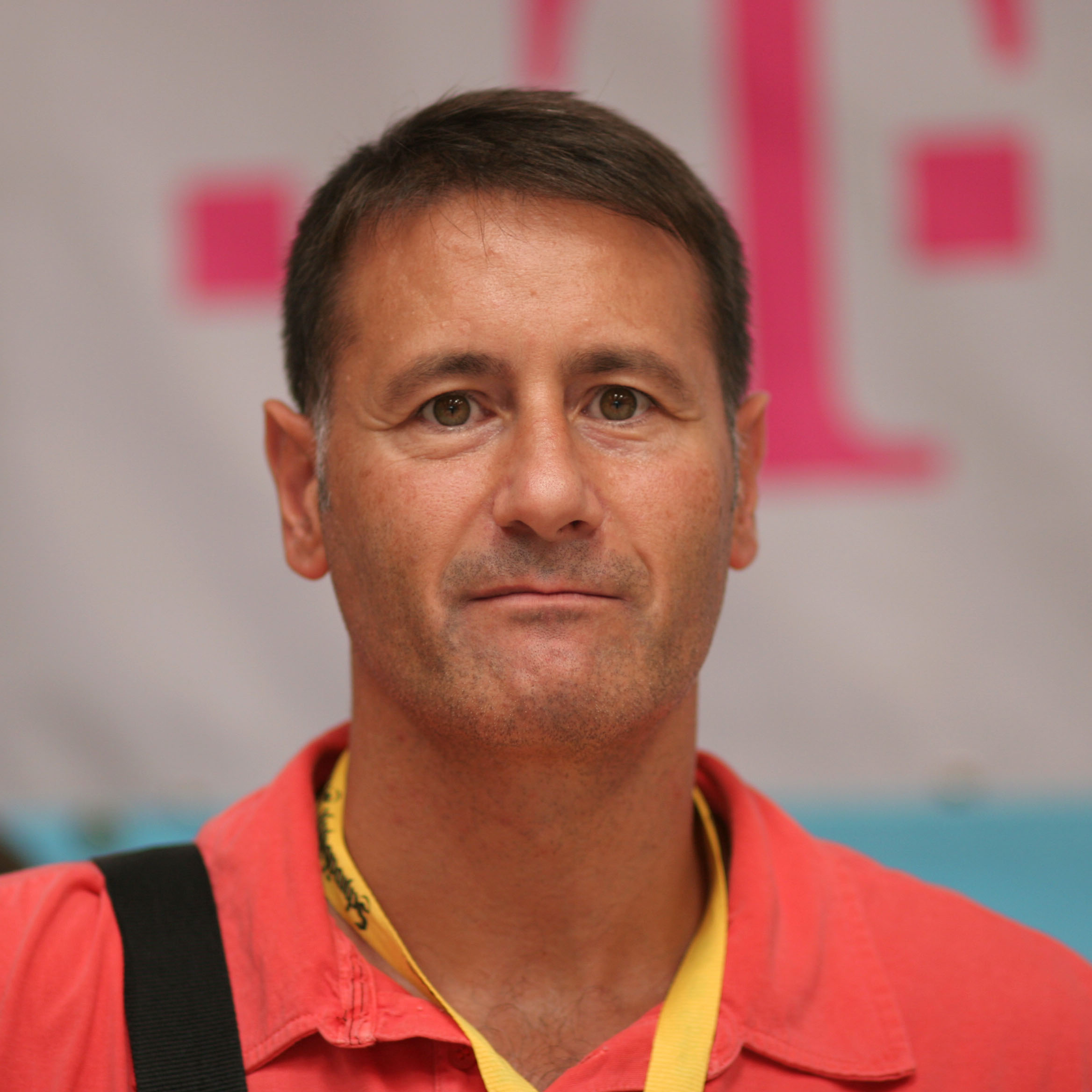
- Fort in 2008

Personal information
- Full name: Jaume Fort Mauri Lorenzo
- Born: 25 July 1966 (age 60) Cardedeu, Spain
- Height: 1.82 m (6 ft 0 in)

Sport
- Sport: Handball
- Position: Goalkeeper

Youth career
- Years: Team
- 1972–1981: BM Cardedeu
- 1981–1986: BM Granollers

Senior clubs
- Years: Team
- 1986–1990: BM Granollers
- 1990–1994: CB Alzira
- 1994–1999: CB Cantabria
- 1999–2001: TBV Lemgo
- 2001–2004: Frisch Auf Göppingen
- 2005: BM Ciudad Real
National team
Years	Team	Apps	(Gls)
1988–2000	Spain	177	(0)
Medal record
Men's Handball
Olympic Games
Bronze medal – third place	1996 Atlanta	Team
European Championship
Silver medal – second place	1996 Spain

Jaume Fort Mauri (born July 25, 1966) is a Spanish handball player who competed in the 1988 Summer Olympics, in the 1992 Summer Olympics, and in the 1996 Summer Olympics.

== Career ==
Fort started playing handball aged 6 at his local club BM Cardedeu. When he was 15 he joined the youth team of BM Granollers. In 1986 he made his senior debut.

In 1990 he joined newly founded team CB Alzira. Here he won the Copa del Rey de Balonmano in 1992 and the EHF Cup in 1993-94.

He then joined CB Cantabria Santander. Here he played for 5 years, winning the Copa Del Rey, Copa ASOBAL, Supercopa ASOBAL and the EHF Cup Winners' Cup.

In 1999 he joined the German team TBV Lemgo, where he won the German Supercup. After two years, he joined the recently promoted team Frisch Auf Göppingen. He retired in 2004. In March 2005 he made his comeback for BM Ciudad Real following an injury to their starting goalkeeper Arpad Šterbik. That season he reached the final of the 2004-05 EHF Champions League, where they lost to league rivals FC Barcelona.

== National team ==
In 1988 he was a member of the Spanish handball team which finished ninth in the Olympic tournament. He played two matches as goalkeeper.

Four years later he was part of the Spanish team which finished fifth in the 1992 Olympic tournament. He played five matches as goalkeeper.

At the 1996 Games he won the bronze medal with the Spanish team. He played six matches as goalkeeper. The same year he won a silver medal at the 1996 European Men's Handball Championship.

At the 2000 European Men's Handball Championship he won a bronze medal.

== Post playing career ==
In 2007 he joined the Athletes Commission of the International Handball Federation. Later he was elected the chair person of the European Handball Players' Union.

Since 2017 he has been the president of the Catalan Handball Federation.
