= Kaba Gassama =

Spanish handball player (born 1997)

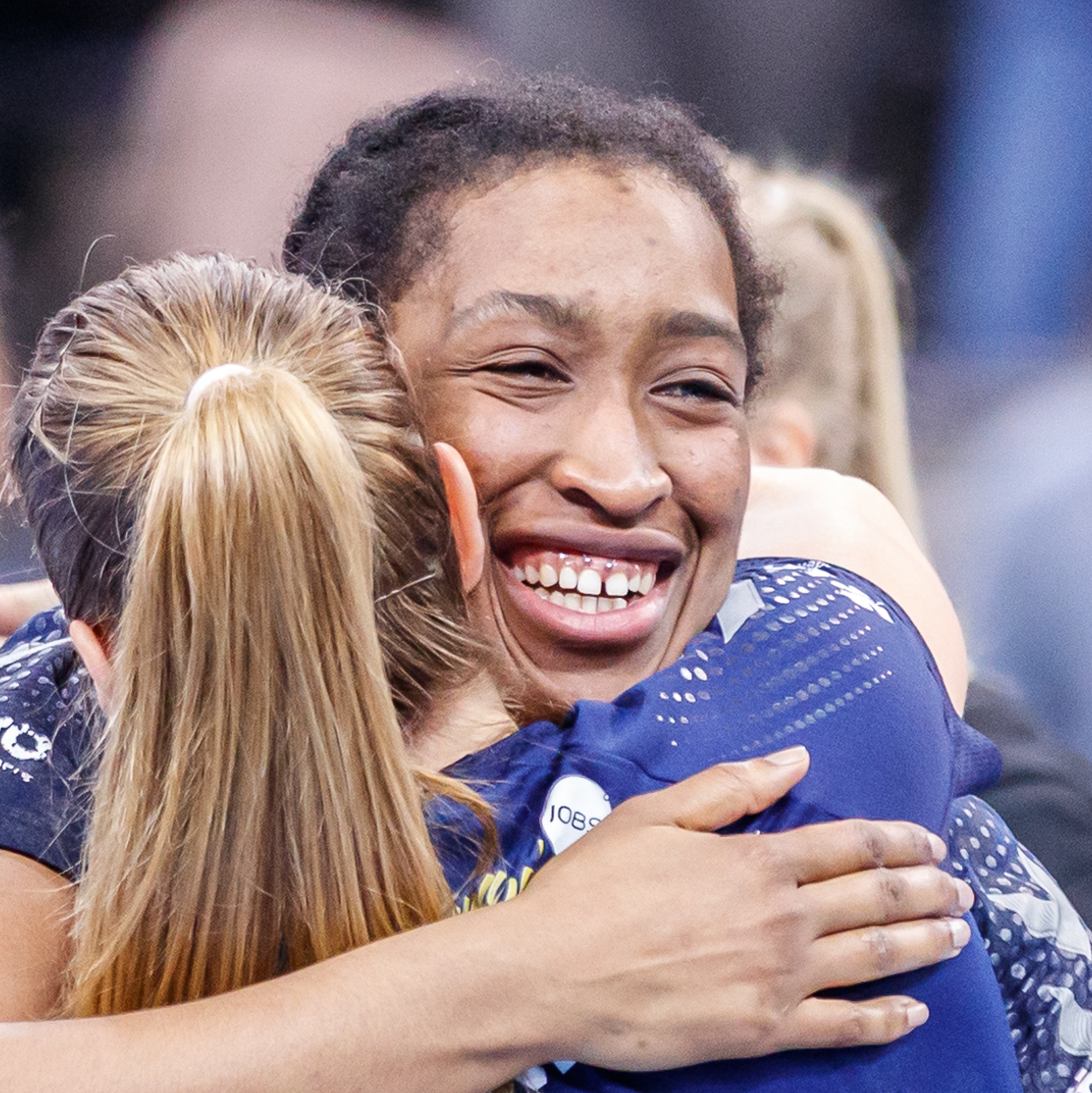
- Gassama in 2023

Personal information
- Full name: Kaba Gassama Cissokho
- Nationality: Spanish
- Born: 16 August 1997 (age 29) Granollers, Spain
- Height: 1.84 m (6 ft 0 in)

Sport
- Sport: Handball
- Position: Pivot
- Current club: HB Ludwigsburg
- Number: 4

Senior clubs
- Years: Team
- 2014–2020: KH-7 Granollers
- 2020–2021: Nantes Atlantique Handball
- 2021–2022: Fleury Loiret HB
- 2022–2024: SG BBM Bietigheim
- 2024–: HB Ludwigsburg
National team
Years	Team	Apps	(Gls)
2017–	Spain	83	(223)
Medal record
Mediterranean Games
Gold medal – first place	2022 Oran	Team
- Updated on 5 November 2025

Kaba Gassama Cissokho (Note: In this Spanish name, the first or paternal surname is Gassama and the second or maternal family name is Cissokho.) (born 16 August 1997) is a Spanish handball player for the German club HB Ludwigsburg and the Spanish national team.

Gassama's older brother Mamadou Gassama is also a handball player, and her other brother, Sekou Gassama, is a footballer.
