= Mamadou Gassama (handballer) =

Spanish handball player (born 1993)

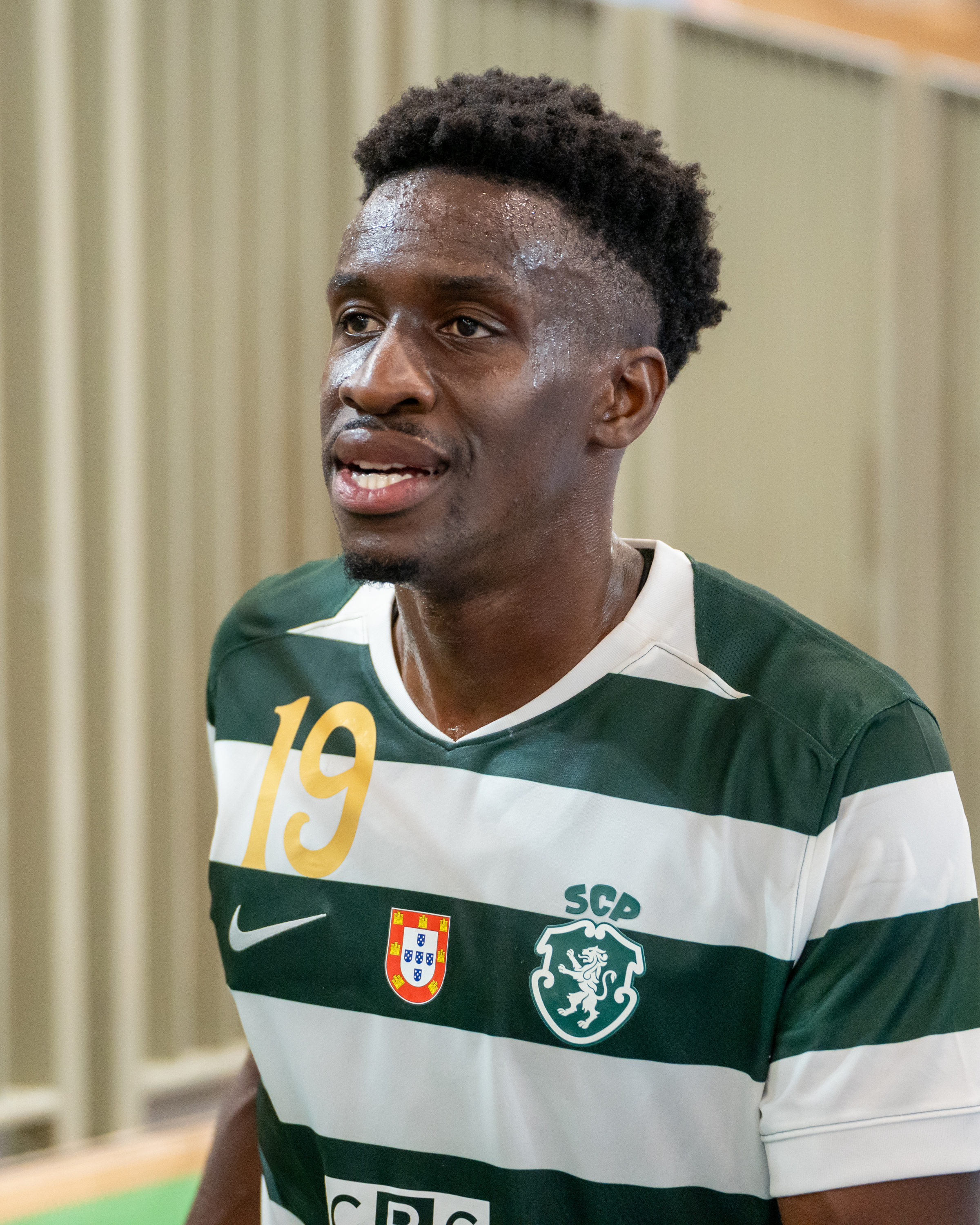

Personal information
- Full name: Mamadou Gassama Cissokho
- Nationality: Spanish
- Born: 28 October 1993 (age 32) Granollers, Spain
- Height: 1.90 m (6 ft 3 in)

Sport
- Sport: Handball
- Position: Right wing
- Current club: Sporting CP
- Number: 19

Senior clubs
- Years: Team
- 2014–: BM Granollers

Mamadou Gassama Cissokho (born 28 October 1993) is a Spanish handball player who plays for Sporting CP.

His sister Kaba Gassama is also a handball player, and his brother, Sekou Gassama, is a footballer.
