= HC Linz AG =

Austrian handball club

- Full name: Handball Club Linz AG
- Short name: Linz
- Founded: 1972; 54 years ago
- Arena: Sporthauptschule Linz Kleinmünchen
- Capacity: 1,200
- Head coach: Milan Vunjak
- League: Handball Liga Austria
- 2024-25: 4th
- Club colours
Home	Away

HC Linz AG is a handball club from Linz, Austria. They currently compete in the Handball Liga Austria.

Location of HC Linz AG

== History ==
The club was founded in 1972. It was promoted to the top division in 1974 and has been in the top division continuously since then. They became Austrian champions seven times (1978, 1979, 1980, 1981, 1994, 1995 and 1996) and won the Austrian Cup four times (1994, 1995, 1996, 1997). In the 1993/94 season, the club reached the final of the EHF Cup.

In the 2023-24 season they won their first championship since 1996.

== Crest, colours, supporters ==
=== Kits ===
HOME
2014–15	2015–16	2017–18

AWAY
2015–16	2017–18	2018-19	2019–20

== Team ==
=== Current squad ===
Squad for the 2023–24 season

HC Linz AG

Goalkeepers

- 16 (Austria) David Zwicklhuber
- 61 (Austria) Florian Kaiper

Left Wingers

- 5 (Austria) Christian Kislinger
- 33 (Austria) Elmar Böhm
- 77 (Austria) Elias Derdak

Right Wingers

- 23 (Austria) Silas Wiesinger

Line Players

- 13 (Austria) Jakob Kropf
- 92 (Croatia) Jadranko Stojanović
- 99 (Bosnia and Herzegovina) Dejan Golubović

Left Backs

- 7 (Croatia) (Bosnia and Herzegovina) Mislav Grgić
- 11 (Austria) Leon Ghent
- 39 (Bosnia and Herzegovina) Arnad Hamzić

Central Backs

- 6 (Austria) Sinisa Sironjic
- 24 (Austria) Moritz Bachmann
- 26 (Slovenia) Lucijan Fižuleto
- 49 (Austria) Ajdin Alkic
- 66 (Austria) Daniel Röthig

Right Backs

- 34 (Austria) Nicolas Paulnsteiner

=== Technical staff ===
- Head coach: (Slovenia) Milan Vunjak
- Assistant coach: (Austria) Manuel Gierlinger
- Fitness coach: (Austria) Matthias Papke
- Physiotherapist: (Austria) Franz Kainz
- Physiotherapist: (Austria) Christoph Eisner
- Club doctor: (Austria) Dr. Franz Gaderer

=== Transfers ===
Transfers for the 2026–27 season

Joining

- (Bosnia and Herzegovina) Omer Mehmedović (CB) from (North Macedonia) RK Eurofarm Pelister
- (Slovenia) Tarik Velić (RB) from (Slovenia) RK Gorenje Velenje
- (Slovakia) Filip Jaszai (RW) from (Austria) HSC Wels

Leaving

- (Bosnia and Herzegovina) Pavle Petrović (RB) to (Austria) HSG Bärnbach/Köflach
- (Belarus) Andrei Klimavets (LB) to (France) Cesson Rennes MHB
- (Austria) Clemens Möstl (LB) to (Germany) Füchse Berlin
- (Austria) Nils Moser (RW) to (Austria) Union St. Pölten
- (Austria) Fabian Palan (RW) to (Austria) HSC Wels

=== Transfer History ===
Transfers for the 2025–26 season

Joining

- (Belarus) Aliaksei Kishou (GK) from (Austria) Handball Tirol
- (Bosnia and Herzegovina) Pavle Petrović (RB) from (North Macedonia) RK Eurofarm Pelister
- (Austria) Nils Moser (RW) from (Austria) Union St. Pölten
- (Austria) Fabian Palan (RW) from (Austria) ASKÖ HC Neue Heimat

Leaving

- (Austria) Florian Kaiper (GK) to (Austria) Jags Vöslau
- (Austria) Moritz Bachmann (CB) to (Austria) Jags Vöslau

Transfers for the 2023–24 season

Joining

- (Austria) Florian Kaiper (GK) from (Austria) SG Handball West Wien
- (Austria) Nicolas Paulnsteiner (RB) from (Austria) SG Handball West Wien
- (Austria) Elias Derdak (RW) from (Austria) SG Handball West Wien
- (Croatia) Jadranko Stojanović (LP) from (Austria) Alpla HC Hard
- (Croatia) (Bosnia and Herzegovina) Mislav Grgić (LB) from (Germany) TSV Bayer Dormagen
- (Bosnia and Herzegovina) Arnad Hamzić (LB) from (North Macedonia) GRK Tikveš
- (Bosnia and Herzegovina) Dejan Golubović (LP) from (Austria) SK Keplinger-Traun

Leaving

- (Austria) Alexander Hermann (LB) (retires)
- (Austria) Maximilian Hermann (RB) (retires)
- (Austria) Markus Bokesch (GK) (retires)
- (Serbia) Dejan Babić (LP) to (Austria) Alpla HC Hard
- (Slovenia) Tine Gartner (RW) to (Austria) Union Handballklub Krems
- (Slovenia) Tobias Cvetko (LB) to (Turkey) Beşiktaş JK

== Titles ==
- Handball Liga Austria
  - Winner (8) : 1978, 1979, 1980, 1981, 1994, 1995, 1996, 2024
- Austrian Cup
  - Winner (4) : 1994, 1995, 1996, 1997
- EHF Cup
  - Finalist: 1994

== European record ==
=== EHF Cup and EHF European League ===
Season	Round	Club	Home	Away	Aggregate
1993–94; Finalist	1/16	(Turkey) Beşiktaş JK	24–9	32–21	56–30
1993–94; Finalist	1/8	(Cyprus) AEL Limassol	wo.		
1993–94; Finalist	1/4	(Hungary) Budapesti Elektromos SE	24–19	22–23	46–42
1993–94; Finalist	1/2	(Romania) Steaua București	21–21	38–23	59–44
1993–94; Finalist	Finals	(Spain) CB Alzira Avidesa	22–21	19–23	41–44

=== EHF ranking ===
As of 5/12/2025

Rank	Team	Points
177	(Russia) Chekhovskiye Medvedi	16
178	(Italy) Handball Meran	16
179	(Germany) ThSV Eisenach	16
180	(Austria) HC Linz AG	16
181	(Romania) CSM Constanța	16
182	(Austria) roomz JAGS Vöslau	16
183	(Hungary) Csurgói KK	15

== Former club members ==
=== Notable former players ===
- (Austria) Dominik Ascherbauer (2008–2021)
- (Austria) Damir Djukic (2004–2005)
- (Austria) Sebastian Feichtinger (1997–2008)
- (Austria) Patrick Fölser (1998–2000)
- (Austria) Manuel Gierlinger (1991–2003)
- (Austria) Alexander Hermann (2008–2012, 2022–2023)
- (Austria) Maximilian Hermann (2008–2011, 2020–2023)
- (Austria) Ewald Humenberger (1986–1996, 2000–2008)
- (Austria) Antonio Juric (2015–2020)
- (Austria) Florian Kaiper (2023–)
- (Austria) Klemens Kainmüller (1990–2005, 2013–2018, 2019)
- (Austria) Werner Lint (2001–2007)
- (Austria) Manuel Papsch (2002–2016)
- (Bosnia and Herzegovina) Srđan Predragović (2017–2018, 2019)
- (Hungary) Zsolt Kontra (1986–1990)
- (Poland) Zygfryd Kuchta (1976–1979)
- (Poland) Andrzej Szymczak (1976–1980)
- (Slovenia) Saša Barišić-Jaman (2012–2013)
