= César Almeida =

César Almeida may refer to:

- César Almeida (fighter) (born 1988), Brazilian kickboxer and mixed martial artist
- César Almeida (handballer) (born 1989), Brazilian handball player
