= Maximilian Hermann =

Austrian handball player (born 1991)

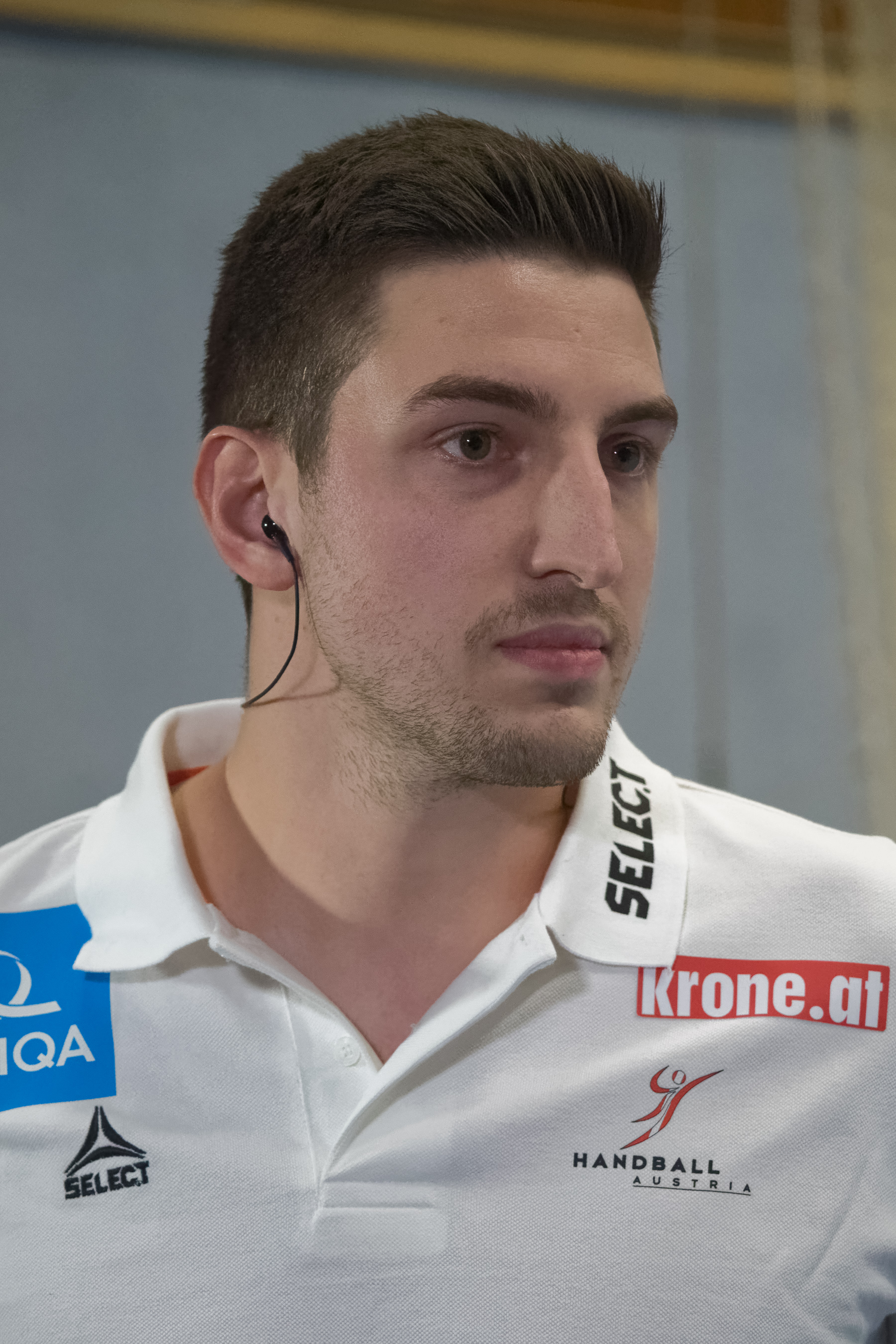

Personal information
- Nationality: Austrian
- Born: 10 December 1991 (age 34) Linz, Austria
- Height: 1.94 m (6 ft 4 in)

Sport
- Sport: Handball
- Position: Right back
- Current club: Los Angeles Handball Club

Senior clubs
- Years: Team
- –2011: HC Linz AG
- 2011–2013: HIT medalp Tirol
- 2013–2017: Bergischer HC
- 2017–2018: VfL Gummersbach
- 2018–2020: Alpla HC Hard
- 2020–2023: HC Linz AG
- 12/2025–: Los Angeles THC
National team
| Years | Team | Apps | (Gls) |
| 2011– | Austria | 61 | (109) |
- Updated on 5 December 2025

Maximilian Hermann (born 10 December 1991) is an Austrian handball player for Los Angeles THC and the Austrian national team.

He is the twin brother of Alexander Hermann.

He retired after the 2022–23 season, but came back to the court to join Los Angeles Handball Club in December 2025. In March 2026 he won the American Championship with the club.
