= Jakub Skrzyniarz =

Polish handball player (born 1996)

Personal information
- Nationality: Polish
- Born: 6 June 1996 (age 30) Głogów, Poland
- Height: 1.89 m (6 ft 2 in)

Sport
- Sport: Handball
- Position: Goalkeeper
- Current club: CD Bidasoa

Youth career
- Years: Team
- 2012–2014: SMS Gdańsk

Senior clubs
- Years: Team
- 2014–2015: SMS Gdańsk
- 2015–2019: Zagłębie Lubin
- 2019–2022: Górnik Zabrze
- 2022–: CD Bidasoa
National team
Years	Team	Apps	(Gls)
2020–	Poland	5	(0)

Jakub Skrzyniarz (born 6 June 1996) is a Polish handball player for CD Bidasoa and the Polish national team.
