= Ole Erevik =

Norwegian handball player (born 1981)

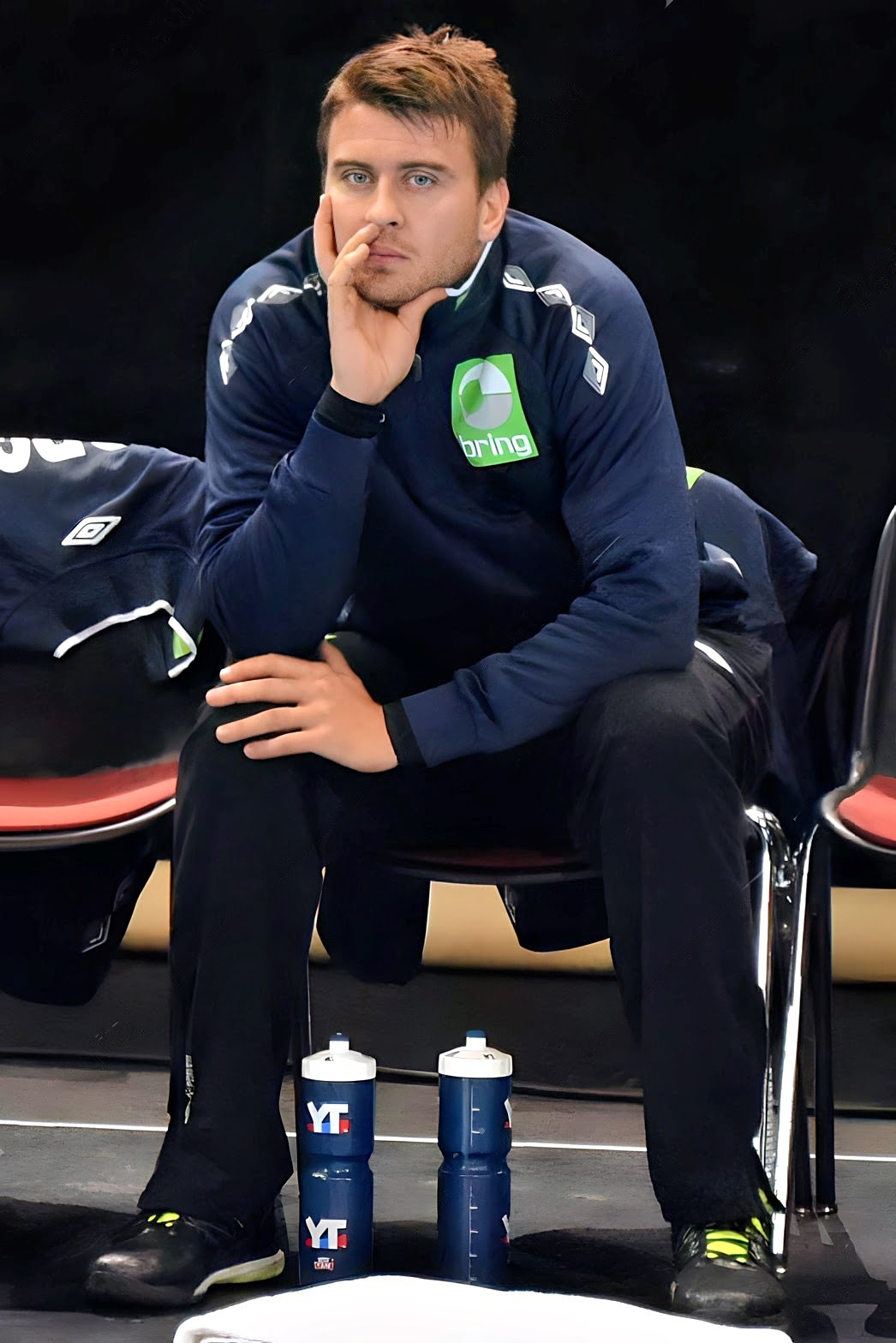
- Erevik in 2016

Personal information
- Nationality: Norwegian
- Born: 9 January 1981 (age 45) Stavanger, Norway
- Height: 1.96 m (6 ft 5 in)

Sport
- Sport: Handball
- Position: Goalkeeper

Senior clubs
- Years: Team
- 2000–2004: Viking Stavanger HK
- 2004–2005: CB Ademar León
- 2005–2007: CD Bidasoa
- 2007–2008: SC Magdeburg
- 2008–2011: KIF Kolding
- 2011–2015: Aalborg Håndbold
- 2015–2017: Pays d'Aix UC
- 2017–2018: GOG
National team
Years	Team	Apps	(Gls)
2001–2017	Norway	184	(0)
Medal record
World Championship
Silver medal – second place	2017 France

Ole Erevik (born 9 January 1981) is a Norwegian retired handball player.

== Career ==
Erevik participated with the Norwegian national team at the 2005, 2007, 2009, 2011 and 2017 World Men's Handball Championship and at the 2006, 2008, 2010, 2012, 2014 and 2016 European Men's Handball Championship.

He won a silver medal with Norway at the 2017 World Men's Handball Championship.

Erevik was awarded the Håndballstatuetten trophy from the Norwegian Handball Federation in 2021.
