= Sekou Gassama =

Senegalese footballer (born 1995)

Personal information
- Full name: Sekou Gassama Cissokho
- Date of birth: 6 May 1995 (age 31)
- Place of birth: Granollers, Spain
- Height: 1.88 m (6 ft 2 in)
- Position: Forward

Youth career
- 2003–2004: Atlético Vallés
- 2004–2007: Barcelona
- 2007–2010: Atlético Vallés
- 2010–2013: Damm
- 2013–2014: Almería

Senior career*
Years	Team	Apps	(Gls)
2013–2014	Almería B	2	(0)
2014–2015	Valladolid B	7	(2)
2015	Rayo Vallecano B	4	(0)
2015–2016	Bergantiños	6	(1)
2016	Badalona	16	(2)
2016–2017	Sant Andreu	33	(12)
2017–2018	Almería B	23	(15)
2018–2020	Almería	25	(6)
2019	→ Valencia B (loan)	8	(3)
2020–2023	Valladolid	1	(0)
2020	→ Fuenlabrada (loan)	9	(3)
2020–2021	→ Fuenlabrada (loan)	9	(5)
2021–2022	→ Málaga (loan)	9	(1)
2022–2023	→ Racing Santander (loan)	16	(1)
2023–2024	Anorthosis Famagusta	26	(9)
2024–2025	USM Alger	9	(2)
2025	Eldense	11	(1)
2026	Universitario de Deportes	4	(0)

International career
- Senegal U20
Medal record
Men's football
Representing Senegal
African U-20 Championship
Silver medal – second place	2015 Senegal
- * Club domestic league appearances and goals as of 20 June 2025

Sekou Gassama Cissokho (born 6 May 1995) is a footballer who plays as a forward. Born in Spain, he represented Senegal at under-20 international level.

== Club career ==
Born in Granollers, Barcelona, Catalonia, Gassama started his career at FC Barcelona's youth setup, as a central defender. He finished his formation with UD Almería, and made his senior debut with the reserves on 13 October 2013, coming on as a half-time substitute in a 0–3 Segunda División B home loss against La Roda CF.

On 14 July 2014, Gassama signed a three-year contract with Real Valladolid, being assigned to the B-team also in the third division. The following 26 January he terminated his contract and joined another reserve team, Rayo Vallecano B in the same category.

Gassama continued to appear in the third and fourth tiers in the following years, representing Bergantiños CF, CF Badalona, UE Sant Andreu and Almería B. With the latter he achieved promotion to the third division by netting a career-best 21 goals, six only in the play-offs.

Gassama was definitely promoted to Almería's main squad in Segunda División ahead of the 2018–19 campaign, and made his professional debut on 17 August, starting in a 0–1 away loss against Cádiz CF. His first professional goal came on 11 September, as he scored the equalizer in a 2–1 away defeat of Málaga CF for the season's Copa del Rey.

On 1 November 2018, Gassama scored a late brace in a 3–3 home draw against Villarreal CF also for the national cup. The following 31 January, he moved to third division side Valencia CF Mestalla on loan until June.

Gassama returned to the Rojiblancos for the 2019–20 season, being a first-choice under Pedro Emanuel and scoring a brace in his first match of the campaign, a 3–0 home defeat of Albacete Balompié. However, he lost space after the arrival of Darwin Núñez and Juan Muñoz, being demoted to a backup option by new manager Guti.

On 28 January 2020, Gassama signed a four-and-a-half-year contract with La Liga side Real Valladolid, being immediately loaned to CF Fuenlabrada until June. On 1 October, he was again loaned to Fuenla for the 2020–21 campaign, but spent most of the season nursing foot and knee injuries.

On 28 August 2021, Gassama moved to fellow second division side Málaga CF on loan for the 2021–22 season. Roughly one year later, he moved to Racing de Santander in the same category, also on a one-year loan deal.

On 1 July 2023, Gassama terminated his contract with Valladolid. Following his departure, he joined Cypriot First Division club Anorthosis Famagusta on a two-year deal.

On 3 February 2025, after a six-month spell at USM Alger, Gassama returned to Spain and its second division, after signing a six-month contract with CD Eldense.

== Personal life ==
Gassama's siblings Mamadou and Kaba are handball players. Gassama is Muslim.
