= Álvaro Ferrer =

Spanish handball player (born 1982)

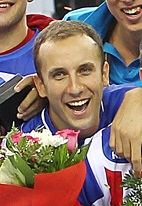
- Ferrer in 2012

Personal information
- Full name: Álvaro Ferrer Vecilla
- Born: 17 March 1982 (age 44) Granollers, Spain
- Height: 1.91 m (6 ft 3 in)

Sport
- Sport: Handball
- Position: Central back
- Current club: BM Granollers
- Number: 8

Senior clubs
- Years: Team
- 2001-2011: BM Granollers
- 2011-2012: CB Ademar León
- 2012-2013: Atlético Madrid
- 2013-2014: FC Porto
- 2014-2014: TSV Hannover-Burgdorf
- 2014-2015: BM La Roca
- 2015-2015: BM Aragón
- 2015-2019: BM Granollers
National team
Years	Team	Apps	(Gls)
2003-2009	Spain	9	(15)

Álvaro Ferrer Vecilla (Note: In this Spanish name, the first or paternal surname is Ferrer and the second or maternal family name is Vecilla.) (born 17 March 1982) was a Spanish handball player. He has played more than 400 matches in Liga ASOBAL.
