= Jordi Nuñez =

Spanish handball player (born 1968)

Jordi Núñez
Personal information
- Full name: Jordi Núñez Carretero
- Nationality: Spanish
- Born: 19 September 1968 (age 58) Granollers, Spain
- Height: 1.90 m (6 ft 3 in)

Sport
- Sport: Handball
- Position: Goalkeeper

Senior clubs
- Years: Team
- 1986–1995: BM Granollers
- 1995–1997: Bidasoa Irun
- 1997–2003: BM Ciudad Real
- 2003–2005: CB Cantabria Santander
- 2005–2006: Club Balonmano Antequera
National team
Years	Team	Apps	(Gls)
1993–2000	Spain	101	(0)
Medal record
Men's Handball
Bronze medal – third place	1996 Atlanta	Team
Bronze medal – third place	2000 Sydney	Team

Jordi Núñez Carretero (born 19 September 1968 in Granollers, Barcelona) is a Spanish handball player who competed in the 1996 Summer Olympics and in the 2000 Summer Olympics.

In 1996 he won the bronze medal with the Spanish team. He played five matches as goalkeeper.

Four years later he won his second bronze medal with the Spanish handball team in the 2000 Olympic tournament. He played four matches as goalkeeper.
