= Alexander Hermann =

Austrian handball player (born 1991)

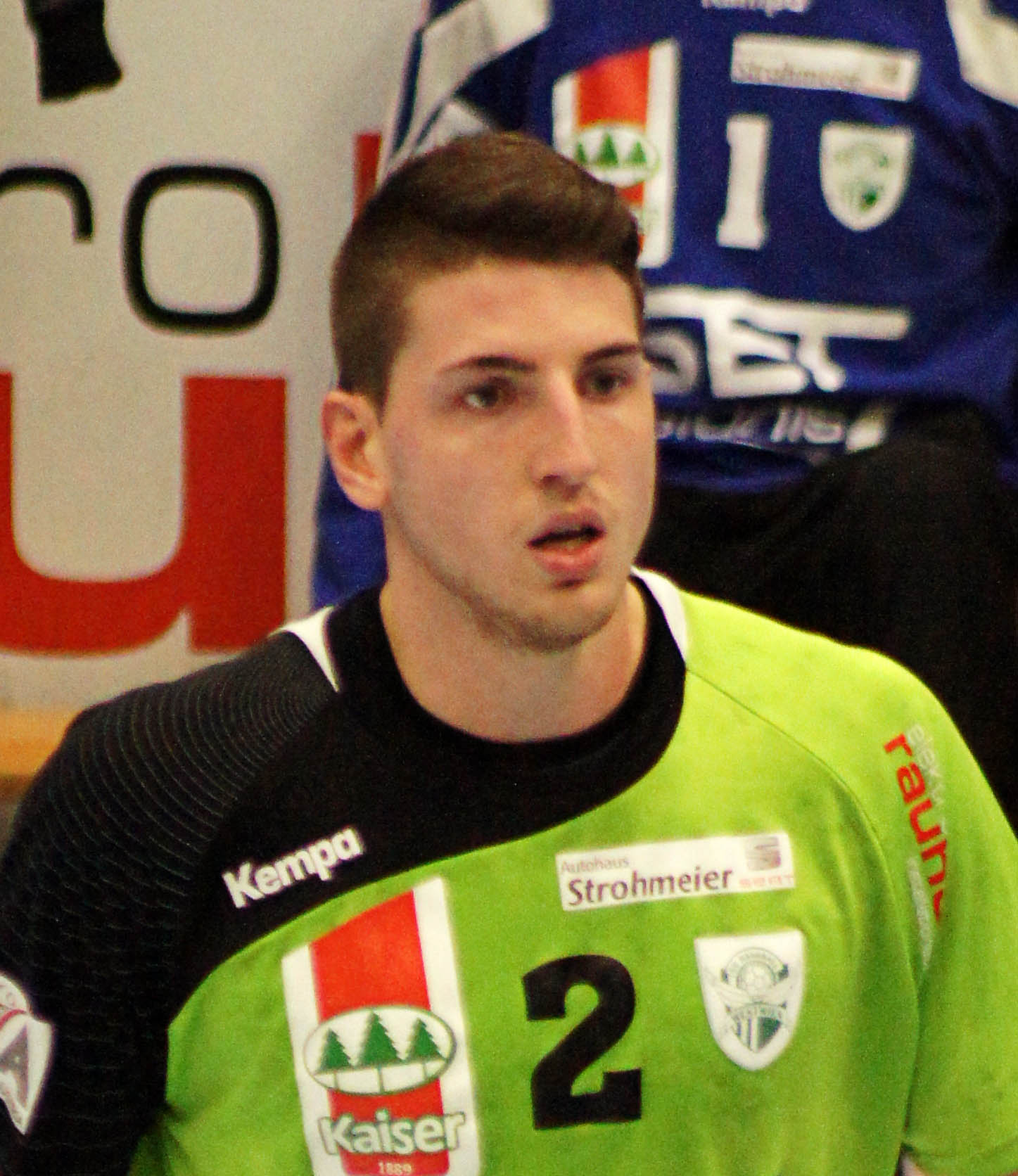

Personal information
- Nationality: Austrian
- Born: 10 December 1991 (age 34) Linz, Austria
- Height: 1.92 m (6 ft 4 in)

Sport
- Sport: Handball
- Position: Left back
- Current club: Retired

Senior clubs
- Years: Team
- -2012: HC Linz AG
- 2012-2015: SG Handball West Wien
- 2015-2017: HSG Wetzlar
- 2017-2019: SG Handball West Wien
- 2019-2022: VfL Gummersbach
- 2022-2023: HC Linz AG
National team
| Years | Team | Apps | (Gls) |
| 2011-2023 | Austria | 80 | (138) |

Alexander Hermann (born 10 December 1991) is an Austrian former handball player who played the Austrian national team.

He retired in 2023 for personal reasons.

He is the twin brother of fellow handballer Maximilian Hermann.
