= Dominik Ascherbauer =

Austrian handball player (born 1989)

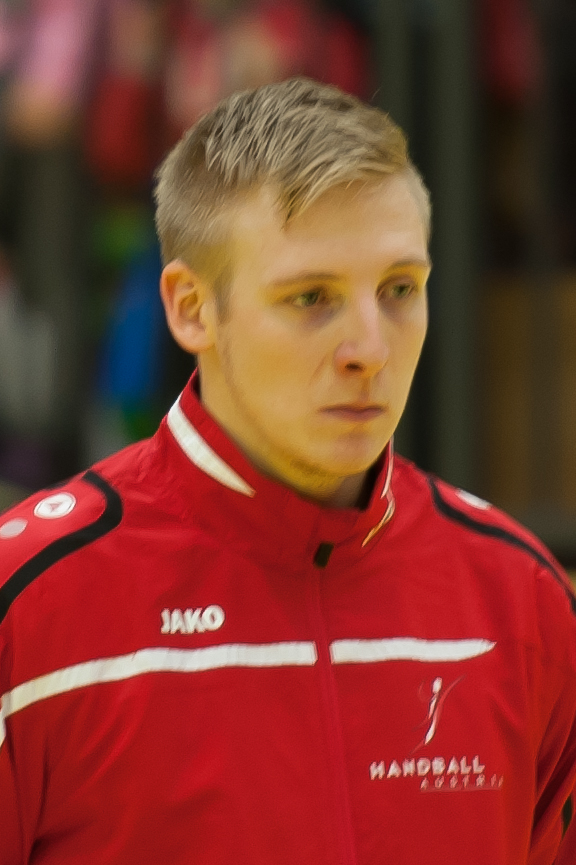

Personal information
- Nationality: Austrian
- Born: 21 August 1989 (age 37) Linz, Austria
- Height: 1.91 m (6 ft 3 in)

Sport
- Sport: Handball
- Position: Left wing

Senior clubs
- Years: Team
- –: HC Linz
National team
| Years | Team | Apps | (Gls) |
| 2013-? | Austria | 6 | (14) |

Dominik Ascherbauer (born 21 August 1989) is an Austrian former handball player for HC Linz and the Austrian national team.
