= Goran Kozomara =

Slovenian handball player

Personal information
- Full name: Goran Kozomara
- Nationality: Slovenian (Slovenia)
- Born: 5 June 1981 (age 45) Celje, Slovenia
- Height: 198 cm (78 in)

Sport
- Sport: Handball
- Position: Line player

Senior clubs
- Years: Team
- -2000: RK Celje
- 2000-2001: Radeče
- 2001: RK Trimo Trebnje
- 2001-2002: BM Granollers
- 2002-2003: RD Slovan
- 2003-2004: RK Velika Nedelja
- 2004-2006: RK Celje
- 2006-2007: CB Cantabria Santander
- 2007-2008: AaB Håndbold
- 2008-2010: Skjern Håndbold
- 2010-2011: BSV
- 2011-2012: Paris HB
National team
Years	Team	Apps	(Gls)
–	Slovenia	72	(79)

Goran Kozomara (born 5 June 1981) is a Slovenian handball player. He played for AaB Håndbold, Skjern Håndbold and BSV in Denmark, Celje Pivovarna Laško in Slovenia, Teka Cantabria and BM Granollers in the best league of Spain, and Paris HB in France.

Kozomara was a regular member of the Slovenian national handball team.
