= Jaime Puig =

Spanish handball player (born 1957)

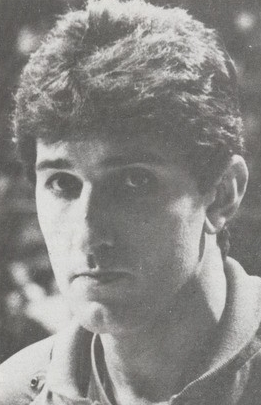
- Jaime Puig (1986)

Personal information
- Full name: Jaime Puig Rofés
- Nationality: Spanish
- Born: 17 June 1957 (age 69) Barcelona, Spain

Sport
- Sport: Handball
- Position: Pivot

Senior clubs
- Years: Team
- 1976–1989: BM Granollers
- 1989–1993: Teka Cantabria
National team
Years	Team	Apps	(Gls)
1981–1989	Spain	172	(486)

Jaime Puig Rofés (born 17 June 1957) is a Spanish handball player. He competed at the 1984 Summer Olympics and the 1988 Summer Olympics.

He played for BM Granollers and Teka Cantabria. With TEKA he won the 1990 EHF Cup Winners' Cup, the 1991 and 1992 Copa ASOBAL, the 1992 Spanish Supercup.

His son Salvador Puig Asbert is also a handball player.
