= Fernando Bolea =

Spanish handball player and coach (1965–2024)

Personal information
- Nationality: Spanish
- Born: 29 May 1965 Zaragoza, Spain
- Died: 27 June 2024 (aged 59) Valladolid, Spain
- Height: 188 cm (74 in)

Sport
- Sport: Handball
- Position: Left wing

Senior clubs
- Years: Team
- 1982–1984: Corazonistas de Zaragoza
- 1984–1985: CN Helios
- 1985–1990: BM Valladolid
- 1990–1995: Bidasoa Irun
- 1995–1995: SD Octavio Vigo
- 1997–1999: VfL Hameln
- 1999–2003: Garbel Zaragoza
National team
Years	Team	Apps	(Gls)
1989–1995	Spain	52	(103)

Teams managed
- 2003–2004: Garbel Zaragoza
- 2004–2006: BM Aragon
- 2006–2007: Pallamano Conversano
- 2007–2012: AD Ciudad de Guadalajara
- 2012–2016: Bidasoa Irun

Fernando Bolea (29 May 1965 – 27 June 2024) was a Spanish handball player and handball coach. He competed in the men's tournament at the 1992 Summer Olympics. Bolea died in Valladolid on 27 June 2024, at the age of 59.
