= 1994–95 EHF Cup =

The 1994–95 season of the EHF Cup was won by BM Granollers.

== Preliminary round ==
Team #1	Agg.	Team #2	1st leg	2nd leg
ROSK Riga (Latvia)	(walkover)	(Azerbaijan) Azeri Baku	–	–
Serviti Põlva (Estonia)	52–55	(Lithuania) Maistas Klaipeda	21–23	31–32

== First round ==
Team #1	Agg.	Team #2	1st leg	2nd leg
Montpellier HB (France)	53–37	(Israel) HC Ness Ziona	27–11	26–26
BM Granollers (Spain)	65–58	(North Macedonia) Vardar Skopje	34–23	31–35
CB Alzira (Spain)	56–43	(Netherlands) HAKA/E&O	29–20	27–23
IFK Skövde (Sweden)	46–44	(Norway) Fyllingen IL	27–20	19–24
Petrolul Craiova (Romania)	36–44	(Slovakia) HT Tatran Prešov	23–21	13–23
UHK West Wien (Austria)	47–52	(Russia) Polyot Chelyabinsk	25–24	22–28
Sporting Clube de Portugal	53–33	(Bulgaria) Lyulin Sofia	23–18	30–15
Initia HC Hasselt (Belgium)	37–63	(Germany) SG Vfl BHW Hameln	15–32	22–31
RK Umag (Croatia)	(walkover)	(Ukraine) ZTR Zaporizhzhia	–	–
HC Prato (Italy)	42–36	(Switzerland) Wacker Thun	17–23	25–13
ROSK Riga (Latvia)	53–72	(Denmark) VRI Aarhus	24–36	29–36
ASKI Ankara (Turkey)	49–44	(Luxembourg) Red Boys Differdange	31–23	18–21
Kilkis GAC (Greece)	50–37	(Georgia (country)) Amirani Tbilisi	24–14	26–23
Maistas Klaipeda (Lithuania)	43–53	(Czech Republic) Tatra Kopřivnice	21–30	22–23
Selfoss (Iceland)	34–40	(Slovenia) Gorenje Velenje	19–24	15–16
Grammar School Nicosia (Cyprus)	35–53	(Hungary) SC Pick Szeged	18–23	17–30

== Eighth-finals ==
Team #1	Agg.	Team #2	1st leg	2nd leg
ASKI Ankara (Turkey)	43–69	(Russia) Polyot Chelyabinsk	22–33	21–36
Gorenje Velenje (Slovenia)	36–36 (a)	(Slovakia) HT Tatran Prešov	20–14	16–22
SC Pick Szeged (Hungary)	47–46	(France) Montpellier HB	27–24	20–22
HC Prato (Italy)	43–41	(Sweden) IFK Skövde	22–18	21–23
ZTR Zaporizhzhia (Ukraine)	45–40	Sporting Clube de Portugal	25–20	20–20
Tatra Kopřivnice (Czech Republic)	32–50	(Spain) BM Granollers	19–30	13–20
Kilkis GAC (Greece)	34–61	(Germany) SG VfL BHW Hameln	18–30	16–31
VRI Aarhus (Denmark)	44–56	(Spain) CB Alzira	25–25	19–31

== Quarter-finals ==
Team #1	Agg.	Team #2	1st leg	2nd leg
SG VfL BHW Hameln (Germany)	50–46	(Ukraine) ZTR Zaporizhzhia	30–20	20–26
BM Granollers (Spain)	52–50	(Spain) CB Alzira	29–21	23–29
HC Prato (Italy)	36–38	(Slovenia) Gorenje Velenje	18–24	18–14
Polyot Chelyabinsk (Russia)	48–48 (a)	(Hungary) SC Pick Szeged	23–21	25–27

== Semi-finals ==
Team #1	Agg.	Team #2	1st leg	2nd leg
SG VfL BHW Hameln (Germany)	47–52	(Spain) BM Granollers	26–24	21–28
Gorenje Velenje (Slovenia)	45–58	(Russia) Polyat Chelyabinsk	24–29	21–29

== Final ==
Team #1	Agg.	Team #2	1st leg	2nd leg
Polyot Chelyabinsk (Russia)	45–49	(Spain) BM Granollers	24–26	21–23

1993–94 EHF Cup

Balonmano Granollers
First title

== See also ==
- European Handball Federation
