= 1994–95 EHF Champions League =

European handball tournament

EHF Champions League
- 1994–95

Tournament information
- Sport: Handball
- Dates: 3 September 1994–22 April 1995
- Administrator: EHF
- Participants: 35

Final positions
- Champions: (Spain) CD Bidasoa Irún

Tournament statistics
- Top scorer: (Federal Republic of Yugoslavia) Nenad Peruničić (82)

The 1994–95 edition of the EHF Champions League was won by CD Bidasoa Irún in their debut at the competition in a final match against the champions of the last two pre-Champions League editions, RK Zagreb.

== Preliminary round ==
| Team 1 | Agg. | Team 2 | 1st leg | 2nd leg |
|---|---|---|---|---|
| GTU Tbilisi (Georgia (country)) | 34–72 | (Slovakia) Lokomotíva Trnava | 17–30 | 17–42 |
| Belasitsa Petrich (Bulgaria) | 46–38 | (Estonia) Kehra Tallinn | 24–17 | 22–21 |
| Pelister Bitola (North Macedonia) | 56–57 | (Belarus) SKA Minsk | 29–24 | 27–33 |

== First round ==
| Team 1 | Agg. | Team 2 | 1st leg | 2nd leg |
|---|---|---|---|---|
| RK Zagreb (Croatia) | 52–45 | (Sweden) Drott Halmstadt | 23–22 | 29 – 23 |
| Cantabria Santander (Spain) | 56–33 | (Turkey) Ankara Spor | 27–15 | 29 – 18 |
| THW Kiel (Germany) | 53–36 | (Slovakia) Lokomotiva Trnava | 26–19 | 27 – 17 |
| MKB Veszprém (Hungary) | 46–39 | (Slovenia) Celje | 22–18 | 24 – 21 |
| Kolding IF (Denmark) | 53–49 | (Iceland) Valur Reykjavik | 27–27 | 26 – 22 |
| Bidasoa Irún (Spain) | 61–43 | (Ukraine) SKA Kiev | 36–25 | 25 – 18 |
| OM Vitrolles (France) | 74–31 | (Luxembourg) Handball Echternach | 36–21 | 38 – 10 |
| Os Belenenses Lisbon (Portugal) | 50–50 (a) | (Greece) Filippos Veria H.C. | 33–24 | 17 – 26 |
| Hapoel Rishon LeZion (Israel) | 38–38 (a) | (Switzerland) Pfadi Winterthur | 25–20 | 18 – 23 |
| Horn Sittardia (Netherlands) | 39–36 | (Belgium) Initia Hasselt | 24–21 | 15 – 15 |
| Dukla Prague (Czech Republic) | 53–40 | (Bulgaria) Belasitsa Petrich | 27–17 | 26 – 23 |
| Steaua Bucharest (Romania) | 48–48 (a) | (Poland) Iskra Kielce | 25–24 | 23 – 24 |
| CSKA Moscow (Russia) | 72–45 | (Cyprus) SPE Strovolou | 41–19 | 31 – 26 |
| Granitas Kaunas (Lithuania) | 50–50 (a) | (Norway) Sandefjord TIF | 26–23 | 24 – 27 |
| HSG Linz (Austria) | 56–49 | (Finland) BK 46 Karis | 32–24 | 24 – 25 |
| SKA Minsk (Belarus) | 49–50 | (Italy) Principe Trieste | 21–23 | 28–27 |

== Eight finals ==
| Team 1 | Agg. | Team 2 | 1st leg | 2nd leg |
|---|---|---|---|---|
| Pfadi Winterthur (Switzerland) | 51–52 | (Hungary) MKB Veszprém | 26–23 | 25 – 29 |
| Iskra Kielce (Poland) | 42–56 | (Spain) Bidasoa Irún | 23–26 | 19 – 30 |
| Horn Sittardia (Netherlands) | 41–54 | (Spain) Cantabria Santander | 27–24 | 14 – 30 |
| Principe Trieste (Italy) | 34–36 | (France) OM Vitrolles | 20–17 | 14 – 19 |
| HSG Linz (Austria) | 41–48 | (Germany) THW Kiel | 19–18 | 22 – 30 |
| Dukla Prague (Czech Republic) | 49–46 | (Greece) Filippos Veria H.C. | 27–16 | 22 – 30 |
| CSKA Moscow (Russia) | 49–54 | (Croatia) RK Zagreb | 32–21 | 17 – 33 |
| Granitas Kaunas (Lithuania) | 49–54 | (Denmark) Kolding IF | 27–22 | 22 – 32 |

== Group stage ==
=== Group A ===
| Team | Pld | W | D | L | GF | GA | GD | Pts |
|---|---|---|---|---|---|---|---|---|
| (Croatia) RK Zagreb | 6 | 4 | 1 | 1 | 156 | 147 | +9 | 9 |
| (Spain) Cantabria Santander | 6 | 3 | 1 | 2 | 155 | 125 | +30 | 7 |
| (Hungary) MKB Veszprém | 6 | 2 | 2 | 2 | 131 | 147 | −16 | 6 |
| (Denmark) Kolding IF | 6 | 1 | 0 | 5 | 140 | 163 | −23 | 2 |

Matchday One
| MKB Veszprém | 24–24 | Cantabria Santander |
| Kolding IF | 31–36 | RK Zagreb |
Matchday Two
| RK Zagreb | 30–18 | MKB Veszprém |
| Cantabria Santander | 28–16 | Kolding IF |
Matchday Three
| MKB Veszprém | 25–20 | Kolding IF |
| RK Zagreb | 20–19 | Cantabria Santander |
Matchday Four
| MKB Veszprém | 23–23 | RK Zagreb |
| Kolding IF | 26–25 | Cantabria Santander |
Matchday Five
| Cantabria Santander | 25–15 | MKB Veszprém |
| RK Zagreb | 23–22 | Kolding IF |
Matchday Six
| Kolding IF | 25–26 | MKB Veszprém |
| Cantabria Santander | 34–24 | RK Zagreb |

=== Group B ===
| Team | Pld | W | D | L | GF | GA | GD | Pts |
|---|---|---|---|---|---|---|---|---|
| (Spain) Bidasoa Irún | 6 | 4 | 0 | 2 | 137 | 126 | +11 | 8 |
| (Germany) THW Kiel | 6 | 3 | 0 | 3 | 137 | 136 | +1 | 6 |
| (France) OM Vitrolles | 6 | 3 | 0 | 3 | 133 | 133 | 0 | 6 |
| (Czech Republic) Dukla Prague | 6 | 2 | 0 | 4 | 139 | 151 | −12 | 4 |

Matchday One
| Dukla Prague | 25–29 | OM Vitrolles |
| Bidasoa Irún | 25–18 | THW Kiel |
Matchday Two
| THW Kiel | 28–24 | Dukla Prague |
| OM Vitrolles | 19–20 | Bidasoa Irún |
Matchday Three
| Bidasoa Irún | 24–19 | Dukla Prague |
| OM Vitrolles | 23–19 | THW Kiel |
Matchday Four
| Dukla Prague | 24–23 | THW Kiel |
| Bidasoa Irún | 22–21 | OM Vitrolles |
Matchday Five
| THW Kiel | 23–21 | Bidasoa Irún |
| OM Vitrolles | 22–21 | Dukla Prague |
Matchday Six
| Dukla Prague | 26–25 | Bidasoa Irún |
| THW Kiel | 26–19 | OM Vitrolles |

== Final ==
| Team 1 | Agg. | Team 2 | 1st leg | 2nd leg |
|---|---|---|---|---|
| Bidasoa Irún (Spain) | 56–47 | (Croatia) RK Zagreb | 30–20 | 26 – 27 |

EHF Champions League
1994–95 winners

First title
