= Dawid Nilsson =

Polish handball coach (born 1977)

Personal information
- Nationality: Polish
- Born: 31 August 1977 (age 49) Sławno, Poland
- Height: 1.90 m (6 ft 3 in)

Sport
- Sport: Handball
- Position: Left back
- Current club: Stal Mielec (manager)

Youth career
- Years: Team
- –1995: Gwardia Koszalin

Senior clubs
- Years: Team
- 1995–2001: Wybrzeże Gdańsk
- 2001–2005: IFK Skövde
- 2005–2007: Bidasoa Irun
- 2007–2008: Aarhus Håndbold
- 2008–2010: Cuenca
- 2010–2012: Dunkerque HB
- 2012–2016: Wybrzeże Gdańsk
National team
Years	Team	Apps	(Gls)
2002–2006	Poland	58	(95)

Teams managed
- 2018–2019: Arka Gdynia
- 2019–: Stal Mielec

Dawid Nilsson (born 31 August 1977) is a retired Polish handball player and current coach of Stal Mielec.
