= Václav Lanča =

Czech handball player

Personal information
- Nationality: Czech (Czechoslovakia)
- Born: 14 August 1966 (age 60) Ostrava, Czechoslovakia
- Height: 197 cm (78 in)

Sport
- Sport: Handball

Senior clubs
- Years: Team
- –: Banik Karvina
- –: BM Valladolid
- –: Grasshopper Club Zurich
- –: BSV Bern
National team
- Years: Team
- –: Czechoslovakia

Václav Lanča (born 14 August 1966 in Ostrava) is a Czech former handball player who competed in the 1992 Summer Olympics.
