= BM Granollers =

Spanish handball club

- Full name: Club Balonmano Granollers
- Nickname: Blanquiblaus
- Short name: BMG
- Founded: 1944; 82 years ago
- Arena: Palau d'Esports, Granollers
- Capacity: 5,685
- President: Alfred Serra
- Head coach: M: Antonio Rama; W: Dolo Martín
- League: M: Liga ASOBAL; W: División de Honor
- 2021–22: M: Liga ASOBAL, 2nd W: División de Honor, 7th
- Club colours
Home	Away

Club Balonmano Granollers, commonly known as BM Granollers, is a professional handball club based in Granollers, Catalonia, Spain.

Location of Fraikin BM Granollers

== History ==
The club was founded in 1944 and it is one of the oldest and most successful Catalan Spanish handball clubs in terms of titles won. Since its inception, the club quickly got a great competitive level. BM Granollers has competed almost every season in the top league of Spanish handball (currently Liga ASOBAL). It became the first Spanish handball club taking part in a European competition in 1959. BM Granollers won the EHF Cup Winners' Cup in 1976, so it became the first Spanish handball club winning a European title.

Thanks to this history, the city of Granollers hosted the handball matches at the Barcelona 1992 Olympic Games. The Palau d'Esports, the current club's arena, was built for this event and subsequently has also hosted the 2013 World Men's Handball Championship and the 2021 World Women's Handball Championship.

One of the BM Granollers' landmarks is its commitment with young players formation. Many great handball players and team managers have been formed in BM Granollers youth academy (players such as Joan Cañellas, Antonio García, Enric Masip and Mateo Garralda; team managers such as Pep Vilà, Miquel Roca Mas, Sead Hasanefendić, Toni García and Carlos Viver). In recent years, moreover, BM Granollers has significantly increased the number of female teams in the youth academy. From the 2014–15 season, BM Granollers has become the only handball club in Spain with main male and female teams simultaneously in the top league of Spanish handball (Liga ASOBAL and División de Honor Femenina).

== Men's handball team ==
=== Crest, colours, supporters ===
==== Kit manufacturers ====
Period	Kit manufacturer
2003 - 2008	(Denmark) Hummel
2008 - 2016	(Germany) Kempa
2016 - present	(Denmark) Hummel

==== Kits ====
HOME
2014–15	2015–16

AWAY
2014–15	2015–16

=== Sports Hall information ===
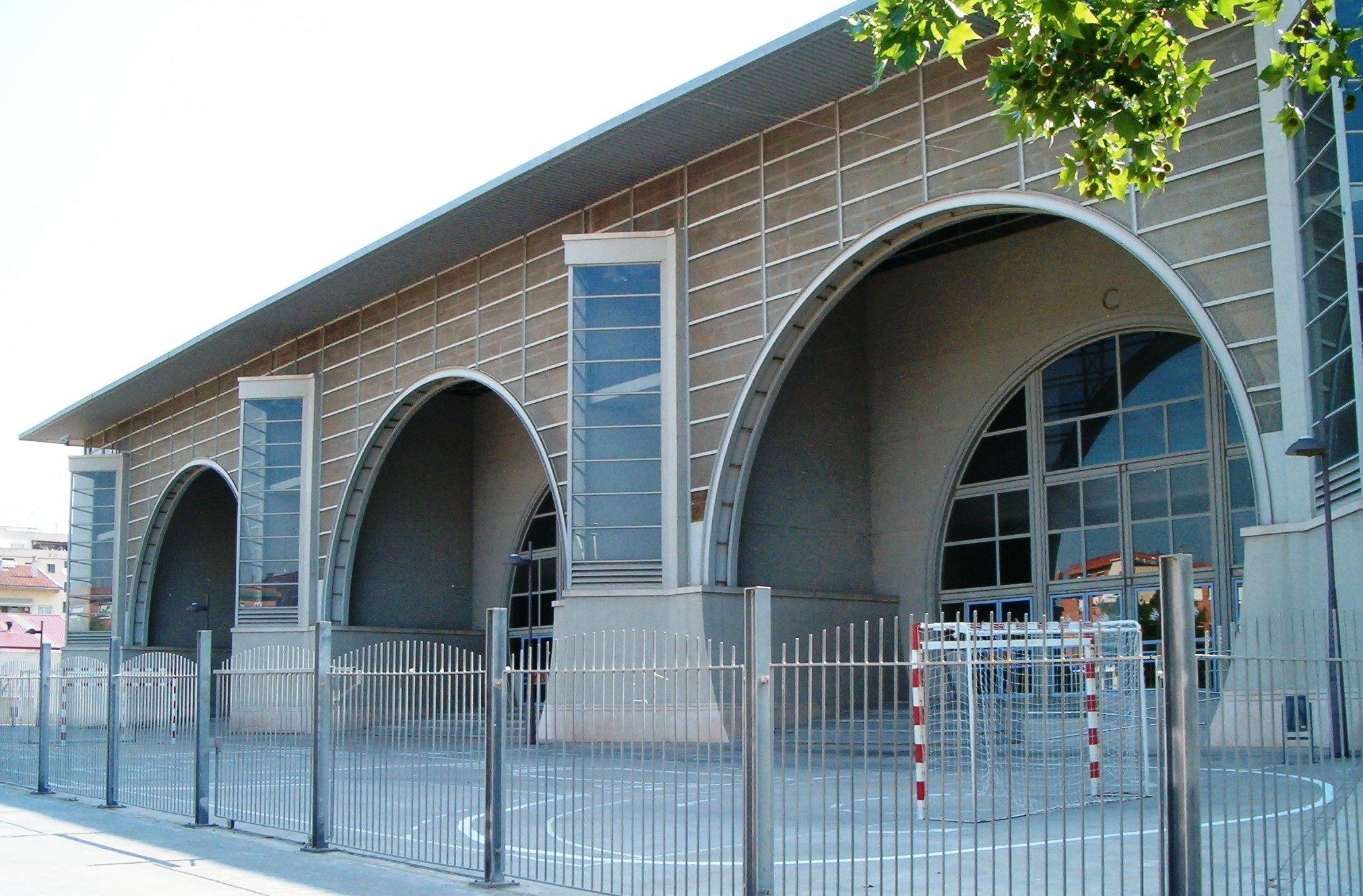
Home hall: Palau d'Esports

- Name: – Palau d'Esports
- City: – Granollers
- Capacity: – 5685
- Address: – Carrer de Francesc Macià i Llussà, s/n, 08400 Granollers, Catalonia, Spain

=== Team ===
==== Current squad ====
Squad for the 2024–25 season

Fraikin BM Granollers

Goalkeepers

- 1 (Spain) Roberto Rodríguez
- 51 (Spain) Pau Panitti

Left Wingers

- 9 (Spain) Jordi Deumal
- 32 (Spain) Pablo Guijarro

Right Wingers

- 34 (Spain) Pablo Ugardagarin
- 77 (Spain) Sergi Franco Miró

Line Players

- 7 (Spain) Victor Romero Holguin
- 10 (Spain) Oriol Rey Morales
- 2 (Spain) Ivan Montoya

Left Backs

- 8 (Brazil) Tarcisio Freitas
- 99 (Spain) Antonio García Robledo

Central Backs

- 21 (Spain) Gerard Domingo
- 6 (Spain) Biel Valera
- 33 (Spain) Ferran Catillo
- 14 (Brazil) Leonardo Abrahão

Right Backs

- 3 (Argentina) Andres Moyano

==== Technical staff ====
- Head coach: (Spain) Antonio Rama
- Assistant coach: (Spain) Pablo Larrumbide
- Goalkeeping coach: (Spain) Perico García
- Physiotherapist: (Spain) Ivan García Perez
- Club Doctor: (Spain) Dr. Joan Vives

=== Transfers ===
Transfers for the 2026–27 season

Joining

- (Spain) Quim Rocas (CB) from (Spain) FC Barcelona

Leaving

- (Spain) Sergi Franco Miró (RW) to (Switzerland) RTV 1879 Basel
- (Spain) Quim Rocas (CB) on loan at (Spain) Ángel Ximénez Puente Genil
- (Serbia) Luka Krivokapić (GK) loan back to (Germany) TVB Stuttgart

=== Transfer History ===
Transfers for the 2025–26 season

Joining

- (Argentina) Guillermo Fischer (LB) from (Spain) BM Villa de Aranda
- (Spain) Adrià Figueras (LP) from (France) C' Chartres MHB
- (Spain) Juan Palomino (LB) from (Spain) FC Barcelona
- (Spain) Josep Ernèst Armengol Garín (LP) from (Spain) FC Barcelona
- (Spain) Bruno Reguart (CB) from (Germany) TVB Stuttgart
- (Serbia) Luka Krivokapić (GK) on loan from (Germany) TVB Stuttgart

Leaving

- (Argentina) Andrés Moyano (RB) to (Spain) Balonmano Torrelavega
- (Brazil) Leonardo Abrahão (CB) to (Austria) Jags Vöslau
- (Spain) Víctor Romero (LP) to (Portugal) Sporting CP
- (Spain) Roberto Rodríguez (GK) to (France) Chambéry SMBH
- (Spain) Oriol Rey Morales (LP) to (North Macedonia) GRK Ohrid
- (Spain) Iván Montoya (LP) to (Spain) CB Eón Alicante
- (Spain) Marc Vega (LW) to (Spain) UD Ibiza HC Eivissa
- (Spain) Biel Valera (CB) to (Spain) UD Ibiza HC Eivissa

=== Previous squads ===
2017–2018 Team
Shirt No	Nationality	Player	Birth Date	Position
1	Spain	Marc Guardia Tomas	13 January 1995 (age 31)	Goalkeeper
2	Spain	Álvaro Cabanas	22 April 1990 (age 36)	Right Winger
3	Spain	Gonzalo Vicente Porras Perez	18 June 1992 (age 34)	Line Player
4	Lithuania	Rolandas Bernatonis	22 January 1987 (age 39)	Left Back
5	Spain	Edgar Perez Lopez	20 March 1994 (age 32)	Left Winger
6	Spain	Ismael Bela Esono Mangue	21 October 1996 (age 30)	Left Back
7	Spain	Marc Garcia Dieguez	27 September 1984 (age 42)	Left Back
8	Spain	Álvaro Ferrer	17 March 1982 (age 44)	Central Back
9	Spain	Pol Valera	19 September 1998 (age 28)	Central Back
10	Spain	Adrià Martínez Bages	25 May 1998 (age 28)	Left Winger
11	Spain	Pau Navarro Baches	7 December 1999 (age 26)	Line Player
12	Spain	Pol Gavanach Llobet	7 July 1997 (age 29)	Goalkeeper
13	Spain	Adrià Figueras	31 August 1988 (age 38)	Line Player
14	Spain	Marc Cañellas	21 July 1995 (age 31)	Central Back
15	Spain	Albert Pujol Armendariz	15 April 1991 (age 35)	Left Back
16	Spain	Enric David Gonzalez Yanez	10 July 1999 (age 27)	Goalkeeper
17	Spain	David Resina Forns	5 April 1987 (age 39)	Left Winger
19	Spain	Mamadou Gassama	28 October 1993 (age 33)	Right Winger
25	Serbia	Vukasin Rakocija	26 April 1996 (age 30)	Left Back
28	Portugal	Jorge Filipe Fernandes Monteiro da Silva	23 May 1989 (age 37)	Right Back
31	Spain	Josep Reixach	16 January 1992 (age 34)	Right Winger
89	Brazil	César Almeida	6 January 1989 (age 37)	Goalkeeper
95	Spain	Alejandro Márquez Coloma	5 January 1995 (age 31)	Right Back
99	Spain	Ian Tarrafeta	4 January 1999 (age 27)	Central Back

2015–2016 Team
Shirt No	Nationality	Player	Birth Date	Position
1	Spain	Marc Guardia Tomas	13 January 1995 (age 31)	Goalkeeper
2	Brazil	Henrique Teixeira	27 February 1989 (age 37)	Left Back
3	Spain	Gonzalo Vicente Porras Perez	18 June 1992 (age 34)	Line Player
4	Spain	Moises Blanxart Moreno	25 January 1988 (age 38)	Right Winger
5	Spain	Edgar Perez Lopez	20 March 1994 (age 32)	Left Winger
6	Spain	Miquel Flores Traveria	29 March 1990 (age 36)	Central Back
7	Spain	Marc Garcia Dieguez	27 September 1984 (age 42)	Left Back
8	Spain	Álvaro Ferrer	17 March 1982 (age 44)	Central Back
9	Spain	Arnau García	12 June 1994 (age 32)	Left Back
10	Spain	Adria Perez Martinez	26 November 1991 (age 34)	Left Winger
13	Spain	Adrià Figueras	31 August 1988 (age 38)	Line Player
14	Spain	Ferran Solé	25 August 1992 (age 34)	Right Winger
15	Spain	Marc Cañellas	21 July 1995 (age 31)	Central Back
16	Spain	Pol Sastre Rodriguez	24 July 1991 (age 35)	Goalkeeper
17	Spain	David Resina Forns	5 April 1987 (age 39)	Left Winger
18	Spain	Mamadou Gassama	28 October 1993 (age 33)	Right Winger
19	Spain	Salvador Puig	4 December 1979 (age 46)	Right Back
25	Brazil	Guilherme Valadão Gama	25 January 1991 (age 35)	Left Back
29	Brazil	José Toledo	11 January 1994 (age 32)	Right Back
33	Brazil	Fernando Pacheco Filho	25 May 1983 (age 43)	Right Back
36	Spain	Gerard Forns Galve	26 December 1994 (age 31)	Goalkeeper
39	Spain	Carles Asensio Cambra	10 August 1997 (age 29)	Line Player
77	Spain	Marc Montolio Montero	3 April 1994 (age 32)	Line Player
89	Brazil	César Almeida	6 January 1989 (age 37)	Goalkeeper
95	Spain	Alejandro Márquez Coloma	5 January 1995 (age 31)	Right Back

2009–2010 Team
Shirt No	Nationality	Player	Birth Date	Position
1	Sweden	Fredrik Ohlander	11 February 1976 (age 50)	Goalkeeper
2	Spain	Marc Pujol Reverter	24 July 1983 (age 43)	Left Winger
3	Spain	Juan del Arco	29 November 1991 (age 34)	Central Back
4	Spain	Juan Andreu	20 January 1985 (age 41)	Line Player
5	Spain	Alejandro Perez-Ortiz Acedo	6 April 1987 (age 39)	Central Back
6	Sweden	Michael Apelgren	20 August 1984 (age 42)	Central Back
7	Spain	Iban Raigal Salcedo	6 September 1982 (age 44)	Line Player
8	Spain	Álvaro Ferrer	17 March 1982 (age 44)	Central Back
9	Spain	Antonio García Robledo	6 March 1984 (age 42)	Left Back
10	Spain	Moises Blanxart Moreno	25 January 1988 (age 38)	Right Winger
11	Spain	Raúl Campos	16 July 1978 (age 48)	Right Back
12	Spain	Alexandre Gonzales Torres	2 April 1990 (age 36)	Goalkeeper
14	Spain	Gonzalo Caracuel del Cacho	20 July 1984 (age 42)	Right Winger
16	Spain	Manel Perez Cantalosella	8 January 1982 (age 44)	Goalkeeper
17	Spain	David Resina Forns	5 April 1987 (age 39)	Left Winger
18	Spain	Manel Cirac Gascon	21 March 1988 (age 38)	Line Player
19	Spain	Salvador Puig	4 December 1979 (age 46)	Right Back
24	SerbiaMontenegro	Aleksandar Svitlica	28 May 1982 (age 44)	Right Winger
27	Sweden	Nicklas Grundsten	1 October 1983 (age 43)	Line Player
32	Serbia	Davor Čutura	28 November 1979 (age 46)	Central Back

=== Honours ===
==== Domestic and European competitions ====
- 1 EHF Cup Winner's Cup: 1975–76
- 2 EHF Cup: 1994–95, 1995–96
- 10 Spanish leagues: 1958–59, 1959–60, 1960–61, 1965–66, 1966–67, 1967–68, 1969–70, 1970–71, 1971–72, 1973–74
- 3 Copa del Rey: 1957–58, 1969–70, 1973–74
- 1 ASOBAL Cup: 1993–94
- 4 Catalan leagues: 1985–86, 1988–89, 1989–90, 1990–91
- 1 Pyrenées league: 2008
- Double

Winners (2): 1969–70, 1973–74

==== Season to season ====
BM Granollers has been playing the top Spanish handball league since 1955, except on 1963–64 and 1964–65 seasons, when it resigned due to changes in the competition system and economic reasons.

Season	Domestic competition		European competition	
Season	League	Pos.	Competition	Result
1955–56	1ª División	1		
1956–57	1ª División	1		
1957–58	1ª División	1		
1958–59	División de Honor	1		
1959–60	División de Honor	1	EHF Champions League	1/4
1960–61	División de Honor	1		
1961–62	1ª División	2	EHF Champions League	1/8
1962–63	1ª División	2		
1965–66	División de Honor	1		
1966–67	División de Honor	1	EHF Champions League	1/16
1967–68	División de Honor	1	EHF Champions League	1/4
1968–69	División de Honor	3		
1969–70	División de Honor	1		
1970–71	División de Honor	1	EHF Champions League	1/4
1971–72	División de Honor	1	EHF Champions League	1/16
1972–73	División de Honor	4	EHF Champions League	1/16
1973–74	División de Honor	1		
1974–75	División de Honor	3	EHF Champions League	1/8
1975–76	División de Honor	5	EHF Cup Winner's Cup	Champion
1976–77	División de Honor	5	EHF Cup Winner's Cup	1/4
1977–78	División de Honor	5		
1978–79	División de Honor	7		
1979–80	División de Honor	4		
1980–81	División de Honor	8		
1981–82	División de Honor	3		
1982–83	División de Honor	3	IHF Cup	1/8
1983–84	División de Honor	4	IHF Cup	1/4
1984–85	División de Honor	4		
1985–86	División de Honor	3		
1986–87	División de Honor	6		
1987–88	División de Honor	3		
1988–89	División de Honor	4		
1989–90	División de Honor	4		

Season	Domestic competition		European competition	
Season	League	Pos.	Competition	Result
1990–91	Liga ASOBAL	7		
1991–92	Liga ASOBAL	2		
1992–93	Liga ASOBAL	Final		
1993–94	Liga ASOBAL	1/4	City Cup	1/2
1994–95	Liga ASOBAL	6	EHF Cup	Champion
1995–96	Liga ASOBAL	5	EHF Cup	Champion
1996–97	Liga ASOBAL	11	EHF Cup	1/2
1997–98	Liga ASOBAL	10		
1998–99	Liga ASOBAL	9		
1999–00	Liga ASOBAL	11		
2000–01	Liga ASOBAL	7		
2001–02	Liga ASOBAL	10		
2002–03	Liga ASOBAL	9		
2003–04	Liga ASOBAL	7		
2004–05	Liga ASOBAL	6	EHF Cup	1/4
2005–06	Liga ASOBAL	10	EHF Cup Winner's Cup	1/4
2006–07	Liga ASOBAL	9		
2007–08	Liga ASOBAL	12	EHF Cup	1/8
2008–09	Liga ASOBAL	6		
2009–10	Liga ASOBAL	8	EHF Cup Winner's Cup	Final
2010–11	Liga ASOBAL	4		
2011–12	Liga ASOBAL	8	EHF Cup	1/4
2012–13	Liga ASOBAL	6		
2013–14	Liga ASOBAL	3		
2014–15	Liga ASOBAL	3	EHF Cup	1/8 (GP)
2015–16	Liga ASOBAL	4	EHF Cup	3 (Final 4)
2016–17	Liga ASOBAL	4	EHF Cup	1/8 (GP)
2017–18	Liga ASOBAL	3	EHF Cup	1/4
2018–19	Liga ASOBAL	5	EHF Cup	1/8 (GP)
2019–20	Liga ASOBAL	6		
2020–21	Liga ASOBAL	4		
2021–22	Liga ASOBAL	2	EHF European League	2QR
2022–23	Liga ASOBAL	3	EHF European League	Final
2023–24	Liga ASOBAL	3	EHF European League	QR
2024–25	Liga ASOBAL	2	EHF European League	MR

=== European record ===
==== Cup Winners' Cup ====
From the 2012–13 season, the men's competition was merged with the EHF Cup.

Season	Round	Club	Home	Away	Aggregate
1975–76; Winners	Round of 16	(Sweden) Västra Frölunda IF	23–19	20–15	43–34
1975–76; Winners	Quarter-finals	(Netherlands) AHC'31 Amsterdam	18–15	31–27	49–42
1975–76; Winners	Semi-finals	(Norway) Oppsal	13–13	15–13	28–26
1975–76; Winners	Finals	(Germany) Grün-Weiß Dankersen	26–24		

==== EHF Cup and EHF European League ====
Season	Round	Club	Home	Away	Aggregate
1994–95; Winners	1/16	(North Macedonia) RK Vardar	34–23	31–35	65–58
1994–95; Winners	1/8	(Czech Republic) Tatra Kopřivnice	20–13	30–19	50–32
1994–95; Winners	1/4	(Spain) CBM Alzira Avidesa	29–21	23–29	52–50
1994–95; Winners	1/2	(Germany) VfL Hameln	28–21	24–26	52–47
1994–95; Winners	Finals	(Russia) Polyot Chelyabinsk	23–21	26–24	49–45
1995–96; Winners	1/16	(Poland) Śląsk Wrocław	25–10	22–16	47–26
1995–96; Winners	1/8	(Greece) GAS Archelaos Katerinis	39–17	35–17	74–34
1995–96; Winners	1/4	(Hungary) Budapesti Elektromos SE	26–20	17–21	43–41
1995–96; Winners	1/2	(Germany) SG Flensburg-Handewitt	25–17	22–27	47–44
1995–96; Winners	Finals	(Ukraine) HC Donbas Donetsk	28–18	28–27	56–45

==== EHF ranking ====
As of 22 October 2026

Rank	Team	Points
24	(Portugal) S.L. Benfica	172
25	(Spain) Bidasoa Irun	168
26	(Germany) TSV Hannover-Burgdorf	165
27	(Spain) Fraikin BM Granollers	163
28	(Slovenia) Celje Pivovarna Laško	162
29	(Hungary) MOL Tatabánya KC	159
30	(Norway) Kolstad Håndball	154

=== Former club members ===
==== Notable former players ====
- (Spain) Vicente Álamo (2002–2008)
- (Spain) Marc Amargant (1996–2003)
- (Spain) Juan Andreu (2004–2010)
- (Spain) Álvaro Cabanas (2016–2018)
- (Spain) Raúl Campos (2001–2012)
- (Spain) José Luis Pérez Canca (2003–2008)
- (Spain) Joan Cañellas (2004–2005, 2008–2009)
- (Spain) Marc Cañellas (2014–2018)
- (Spain) Juan del Arco (2009–2015)
- (Spain) Aitor Etxaburu (1991–1993)
- (Spain) Eduard Fernández Roura (1997–2002)
- (Spain) Álvaro Ferrer (2001–2011, 2015–2019)
- (Spain) Adrià Figueras (2014–2020)
- (Spain) Jaume Fort (1981–1990)
- (Spain) Aleix Franch (1987–1992)
- (Spain) Arnau García (2011–2017)
- (Spain) Mateo Garralda (1986–1991)
- (Spain) Cristian Malmagro (2000–2007)
- (Spain) Chema Márquez (2020–2022)
- (Spain) Enric Masip (1987–1990)
- (Spain) Jordi Nuñez (1986–1995)
- (Spain) Gonzalo Pérez de Vargas (2011–2013)
- (Spain) Jaime Puig (1976–1989)
- (Spain) Salvador Puig (1993–2003, 2008–2011, 2014–2016)
- (Spain) Albert Rocas (1997–2000)
- (Spain) Álvaro Ruiz Sánchez (2013–2015)
- (Spain) Eugeni Serrano (1977–1979)
- (Spain) Ferran Solé (2011–2016)
- (Spain) Ian Tarrafeta (2017–2020)
- (Spain) Antonio Ugalde (1994–2003)
- (Spain) Pol Valera (2017–2023)
- (Spain) Carlos Viver (1991–1999, 2000–2008)
- (Argentina) Nicolás Bonanno (2019–2020)
- (Argentina) Matías Schulz (2013–2014)
- (Bosnia and Herzegovina) Denis Bahtijarević (2001–2004)
- (Brazil) César Almeida (2015–2016, 2017–2020)
- (Brazil) Oswaldo Guimarães (2018–2020)
- (Brazil) Fernando Pacheco Filho (2015–2016)
- (Brazil) Henrique Teixeira (2015–2016)
- (Brazil) José Toledo (2014–2015)
- (Brazil) Guilherme Valadão Gama (2014–2016)
- (Chile) Rodrigo Salinas Muñoz (2012–2014)
- (Croatia) Patrik Ćavar (2001–2005)
- (Croatia) Venio Losert (2001–2004)
- (Croatia) Zoran Mikulić (1995–1996)
- (Czech Republic) Michal Kasal (2016–2017)
- (Czech Republic) Tomáš Řezníček (2011–2012)
- (France) Éric Cailleaux (1983–1984)
- (Iceland) Árni Þór Sigtryggsson (2007–2008)
- (Iceland) Geir Sveinsson (1989–1991)
- (South Korea) Kim Sung-Heon (1999–2001)
- (Lithuania) Rolandas Bernatonis (2017–2018)
- (Lithuania) Aidenas Malašinskas (2011–2013)
- (Montenegro) Veselin Vujović (1993–1995)
- (Russia) Vyacheslav Atavin (2000–2002)
- (Russia) Vladislav Kalarash (1996–1997)
- (Russia) Oleg Kisselev (1992–1994)
- (Russia) Andrey Tyumentsev (1991–1992)
- (Slovenia) Goran Kozomara (2001–2002)
- (Serbia) Igor Butulija (1994–1995)
- (Serbia) Davor Čutura (2007–2010)
- (Serbia) Marko Krivokapić (2004–2007)
- (Serbia) Draško Nenadić (2010–2012, 2019–2020)
- (Serbia) Ivan Nikčević (2010–2011)
- (Serbia) Dimitrije Pejanović (2014–2015)
- (Serbia) (Montenegro) Aleksandar Svitlica (2007–2011)
- (Serbia) Slobodan Veselinović (1997–1999)
- (Sweden) Michael Apelgren (2009–2010)
- (Sweden) Per Carlén (1985–1989)
- (Sweden) Peter Gentzel (2000–2001)
- (Sweden) Nicklas Grundsten (2009–2015)
- (Sweden) Peder Järphag (1986–1988)
- (Sweden) Fredrik Ohlander (2008–2011)
- (Sweden) Tomas Sivertsson (2000–2001)
- (Sweden) Ljubomir Vranjes (1999–2001)

==== Former coaches ====
Seasons	Coach	Country
1952–1970	Pep Vilà	(Spain)
1970–1974	Miquel Roca Mas	(Spain)
1974–1980	Joaquín Crespo "Quini"	(Spain)
1980–1984	Ferran Raga	(Spain)
1984–1989	Emilio Alonso Río	(Spain)
1989–1992	Josep Maria Guiteras	(Spain)
1992–1997	Manuel Montoya	(Spain)
1997–1998	José Luis Villanueva López	(Spain)
1998–1999	Josep Maria Guiteras	(Spain)
1999–2000	Jaume Puig	(Spain)
2000–2002	Sead Hasanefendić	(Croatia)
2002–2008	Manuel Montoya	(Spain)
2008–2010	Lorenzo Rueda	(Spain)
2010–2012	Manolo Cadenas Montañés	(Spain)
2012–2014	Toni Garcia Guerrero	(Spain)
2014–2017	Carlos Viver	(Spain)
2017–	Antonio Rama	(Spain)

== Women's handball team ==
=== Honours ===
==== Domestic competition ====
- 7 Catalan Champions Trophy: 2014, 2015, 2016, 2017, 2018, 2019, 2020
- 1 Spanish Championship (División de Honor Plata): 2013–14

==== Season to season ====
BM Granollers has been playing the top Spanish handball league since 2014.

Season	Domestic competition		European competition	
Season	League	Pos.	Competition	Result
2014–15	División de Honor Femenina	12		
2015–16	División de Honor Femenina	12		
2016–17	División de Honor Femenina	10		
2017–18	División de Honor Femenina	8		
2018–19	División de Honor Femenina	4		
2019–20	División de Honor Femenina	6	Challenge Cup	1/2 (cancelled)
2020–21	División de Honor Femenina	6	Challenge Cup	R3

=== Team ===
==== Current squad ====
Squad for the 2020–21 season

Num	Name	Age	Height	Country	Position
16	Marta Mera	20	1.71	(Spain)	Goalkeeper
13	Giulia Guarieiro	24	1.78	(Brazil)	Left back
8	Mireia Torras	24	1.65	(Spain)	Central back
98	Martina Capdevila	21	1.75	(Spain)	Central back
99	Carmen Prelchi	21	1.71	(Spain)	Pivot
10	Lora Sarandeva	22	1.76	(Bulgaria)	Left back
7	Elene Vázquez	20	1.77	(Spain)	Left back
1	Nicole Wiggins	20	1.72	(Spain)	Goalkeeper
28	Jana Castañera	19	1.68	(Spain)	Left wing
14	Ona Vegué	23	1.67	(Spain)	Left wing
23	Ana González	22	1.67	(Spain)	Right wing
51	Janna Sobrepera	20	1.72	(Spain)	Left back
9	Lea Kofler	19	1.71	(Austria)	Left back

Technical staff:

- (Spain) Robert Cuesta | Head coach
- (Spain) Jessica Bonilla | Assistant manager
- (Spain) Antonio Romero | Team liaison
- (Spain) Joan Vives Turcó | Doctor
