= Cyril Viudes =

French handball player (born 1982)

Personal information
- Nationality: French
- Born: 6 February 1982 (age 44) Champigny-sur-Marne, France
- Height: 1.98 m (6 ft 6 in)

Sport
- Sport: Handball
- Position: Line player
- Current club: KIF Kolding København
- Number: 19

Senior clubs
- Years: Team
- –2005: Toulouse Union HB
- 2005-2007: Bidasoa Irún
- 2007-2012: Saint-Raphaël Var Handball
- 2012-2019: KIF Kolding København

Cyril Viudes (born 6 February 1982) is a French former handball player. He played for KIF Kolding København in Denmark, Saint-Raphaël Var Handball and Toulouse Union HB in his home country and Bidasoa Irún in Spain.

At KIF Kolding København he won the 2014 and 2015 Danish Championship and in 2014, the Danish Cup.
