= EHF European League =

European handball cup competition

- Current season, competition or edition: 2026–27 EHF European League
- Sport: Handball
- Founded: 1981
- No. of teams: 32
- Country: EHF members
- Confederation: EHF (Europe)
- Most recent champions: (Germany) MT Melsungen (1st title)
- Most titles: (Germany) Frisch Auf Göppingen (Germany) THW Kiel (Germany) SC Magdeburg (4 titles each)
- Level on pyramid: 2
- Website: ehfel.eurohandball.com

The EHF European League is an annual men's handball club competition organised by the European Handball Federation (EHF) since 1981. It is the second-tier competition of European club handball, ranking only below the EHF Champions League. Previously called the EHF Cup, the competition will be known as the EHF European League from the season 2020–21. MT Melsungen are the current holders.

== History ==
It was formerly known as the IHF Cup until 1993. Also, starting from the 2012–13 season the competition has been merged with the EHF Cup Winners' Cup. The EHF coefficient rank decides, which teams have access and in which stage they enter.

== Winners ==
=== IHF Cup ===
Year	Final			Semifinal losers	
Year	Champion	Score	Second place	Semifinal losers	
1981–82; Details	(West Germany); VfL Gummersbach	23–14	(Socialist Federal Republic of Yugoslavia); Željezničar Sarajevo	(Czechoslovakia); Slavia Prague	(Switzerland); Pfadi Winterthur
1982–83; Details	(Soviet Union); ZTR Zaporizhzhia	23–16; 22–20	(Sweden); IFK Karlskrona	(West Germany); Füchse Berlin	(Finland); BK-46 Karis
1983–84; Details	(West Germany); TV Grosswallstadt	16–15; 20–19	(Denmark); HG Gladsaxe	(Hungary); Bányász Tatabánya	(Czechoslovakia); TK Lokomotiva Trnava
1984–85; Details	(Romania); HC Minaur Baia Mare	22–17; 14–18	(Soviet Union); ZTR Zaporizhzhia	(Spain); Tecnisa Alicante	(Austria); WAT Margareten Wien
1985–86; Details	(Hungary); Raba Vasas ETO Györ	23–17; 20–24	(Spain); Tecnisa Alicante	(Socialist Federal Republic of Yugoslavia); Proleter Zrenjanin	(Sweden); Lugi Lund
1986–87; Details	(Soviet Union); Granitas Kaunas	23–23; 18–18	(Spain); Atlético Madrid BM	(West Germany); VfL Gummersbach	(Norway); Urædd Porsgrun
1987–88; Details	(Romania); HC Minaur Baia Mare	20–21; 23–20	(Soviet Union); Granitas Kaunas	(Spain); FC Barcelona	(Switzerland); TSV St. Otmar St. Gallen
1988–89; Details	(West Germany); TURU Düsseldorf	17–12; 15–18	(East Germany); ASK Vorwärts Frankfurt	(Spain); CD Cajamadrid	(Soviet Union); SKIF Krasnodar
1989–90; Details	(Soviet Union); SKIF Krasnodar	25–27; 29–13	(Socialist Federal Republic of Yugoslavia); Proleter Zrenjanin	(Spain); CD Cajamadrid	(Czechoslovakia); Dukla Prague
1990–91; Details	(Socialist Federal Republic of Yugoslavia); Borac Banja Luka	20–15; 23–24	(Soviet Union); CSKA Moscow	(Germany); TUSEM Essen	(Czechoslovakia); SKP Bratislava
1991–92; Details	(Germany); SG Wallau-Massenheim	23–25; 22–20	(Belarus); SKA Minsk	(Spain); Alzira Avidesa	(Socialist Federal Republic of Yugoslavia); Proleter Zrenjanin
1992–93; Details	(Spain); Cantabria	24–20; 26–20	(Germany); Bayer Dormagen	(Romania); Steaua Bucuresti	(Germany); SG Leutershausen

=== EHF Cup ===
Year	Final			Semifinal losers		
Year	Champion	Score	Second place	Semifinal losers		
1993–94; Details	(Spain); Alzira Avidesa	23–19; 21–22	(Austria); ASKÖ Linde Linz	(Spain); Elgorriaga Bidasoa		(Romania); Steaua Bucuresti
1994–95; Details	(Spain); Granollers	26–24; 23–21	(Russia); Polyot Cheljabinsk	(Slovenia); Gorenje Velenje		(Germany); SG Vfl BHW Hameln
1995–96; Details	(Spain); Granollers	28–18; 28–27	(Ukraine); Shakhtar-Academiya	(Croatia); Zadar Gortan		(Germany); SG Flensburg-Handewitt
1996–97; Details	(Germany); SG Flensburg-Handewitt	22–25; 30–17	(Denmark); Virum Sorgenfri	(Spain); Academia Octavio Vigo		(Spain); Granollers
1997–98; Details	(Germany); THW Kiel	23–25; 26–21	(Germany); SG Flensburg-Handewitt	(Russia); CSKA Moscow		(Croatia); Brodomerkur
1998–99; Details	(Germany); SC Magdeburg	22–30; 31–22	(Spain); BM Valladolid	(Germany); TBV Lemgo		(Norway); Sandefjord TIF
1999–00; Details	(Croatia); RK Metković Jambo	24–22; 23–25	(Germany); SG Flensburg-Handewitt	(Portugal); ABC Braga		(Slovenia); Prevent
2000–01; Details	(Germany); SC Magdeburg	27–27; 26–22	(Croatia); RK Metković Jambo	(Spain); Bidasoa Irun		(Iceland); Haukar
2001–02; Details	(Germany); THW Kiel	36–29; 24–28	(Spain); FC Barcelona	(Germany); SG Wallau-Massenheim		(Spain); Gáldar
2002–03; Details	(Spain); FC Barcelona	35–23; 33–26	(Russia); Lukoil-Dynamo Astrakhan	(Hungary); Dunaferr SE		(Spain); Altea
2003–04; Details	(Germany); THW Kiel	32–28; 27–19	(Spain); Altea	(Romania); Dinamo-Romc. Bucuresti		(Russia); Lukoil-Dynamo Astrakhan
2004–05; Details	(Germany); TUSEM Essen	22–30; 31–22	(Germany); SC Magdeburg	(Germany); VfL Gummersbach		(Russia); Lukoil-Dynamo Astrakhan
2005–06; Details	(Germany); TBV Lemgo	30–29; 25–22	(Germany); Frisch Auf Göppingen	(France); US Créteil Handball		(Germany); VfL Gummersbach
2006–07; Details	(Germany); SC Magdeburg	30–30; 31–28	(Spain); CAI Aragón	(Switzerland); Grasshopper Club Zürich		(Denmark); Skjern Handball
2007–08; Details	(Germany); HSG Nordhorn	31–27; 29–30	(Denmark); FCK Handball	(Spain); CAI Aragón		(Slovenia); Cimos Koper
2008–09; Details	(Germany); VfL Gummersbach	29–28; 26–22	(Slovenia); Gorenje	(Switzerland); TSV St. Otmar St. Gallen		(Spain); CAI Aragón
2009–10; Details	(Germany); TBV Lemgo	24–18; 28–30	(Switzerland); Kadetten Schaffhausen	(Spain); Naturhouse La Rioja		(Germany); SG Flensburg-Handewitt
2010–11; Details	(Germany); Frisch Auf Göppingen	23–21; 30–26	(Germany); TV Grosswallstadt	(Spain); Naturhouse La Rioja		(Germany); TBV Lemgo
2011–12; Details	(Germany); Frisch Auf Göppingen	34–28; 26–26	(France); Dunkerque HB	(Germany); Rhein-Neckar Löwen		(Germany); SC Magdeburg
Year	Final – Four					
Year	Champion	Score	Second place	Third place	Score	Fourth place
2012–13; Details	(Germany); Rhein-Neckar Löwen	26–24	(France); HBC Nantes	(Denmark); Tvis Holstebro	28–27	(Germany); Frisch Auf Göppingen
2013–14; Details	(Hungary); Pick Szeged	29–28	(France); Montpellier AHB	(Germany); Füchse Berlin	29–28	(Romania); HCM Constanța
2014–15; Details	(Germany); Füchse Berlin	30–27	(Germany); Hamburg	(Denmark); Skjern Håndbold	27–22	(Slovenia); Gorenje Velenje
2015–16; Details	(Germany); Frisch Auf Göppingen	32–26	(France); HBC Nantes	(Spain); Fraikin Granollers	25–21	(France); Chambéry Savoie
2016–17; Details	(Germany); Frisch Auf Göppingen	30–22	(Germany); Füchse Berlin	(Germany); SC Magdeburg	32–31	(France); Saint-Raphaël Var Handball
2017–18; Details	(Germany); Füchse Berlin	28–25	(France); Saint-Raphaël Var Handball	(Germany); SC Magdeburg	35–25	(Germany); Frisch Auf Göppingen
2018–19; Details	(Germany); THW Kiel	26–22	(Germany); Füchse Berlin	(Portugal); FC Porto	28–26	(Denmark); TTH Holstebro
2019–20; Details	Cancelled due to COVID-19 pandemic					

=== EHF European League ===
Year	Final – Four					
Year	Champion	Score	Second place	Third place	Score	Fourth place
2020–21; Details	(Germany); SC Magdeburg	28–25	(Germany); Füchse Berlin	(Germany); Rhein-Neckar Löwen	32–27	(Poland); Orlen Wisła Płock
2021–22; Details	(Portugal); SL Benfica	40–39	(Germany); SC Magdeburg	(Poland); Orlen Wisła Płock	27–22	(Croatia); RK Nexe
2022–23; Details	(Germany); Füchse Berlin	36–31	(Spain); BM Granollers	(Germany); Frisch Auf Göppingen	33–29	(France); Montpellier HB
2023–24; Details	(Germany); Flensburg-Handewitt	36–31	(Germany); Füchse Berlin	(Germany); Rhein-Neckar Löwen	32–31	(Romania); Dinamo București
2024–25; Details	(Germany); Flensburg-Handewitt	32–25	(France); Montpellier HB	(Germany); THW Kiel	37–31	(Germany); MT Melsungen
2025–26; Details	(Germany); MT Melsungen	24–23	(Germany); THW Kiel	(Germany); Flensburg-Handewitt	32–30	(France); Montpellier HB

== Statistics ==
=== Winning clubs ===
Performance in the EHF Cup/European League by club
Club	Winners	Runners-up	Years won	Years runner-up
(Germany) SC Magdeburg	4	2	1999, 2001, 2007, 2021	2005, 2022
(Germany) Frisch Auf Göppingen	4	1	2011, 2012, 2016, 2017	2006
(Germany) THW Kiel	4	1	1998, 2002, 2004, 2019	2026
(Germany) Füchse Berlin	3	4	2015, 2018, 2023	2017, 2019, 2021, 2024
(Germany) SG Flensburg-Handewitt	3	2	1997, 2024, 2025	1998, 2000
(Spain) BM Granollers	2	1	1995, 1996	2023
(Romania) HC Minaur Baia Mare	2	0	1985, 1988	—
(Germany) VfL Gummersbach	2	0	1982, 2009	—
(Germany) TBV Lemgo	2	0	2006, 2010	—
(Soviet Union) ZTR Zaporizhzhia	1	1	1983	1985
(Soviet Union) Granitas Kaunas	1	1	1987	1988
(Croatia) RK Metković	1	1	2000	2001
(Spain) FC Barcelona	1	1	2003	2002
(Germany) TV Grosswallstadt	1	1	1984	2011
(Hungary) Raba Vasas ETO Györ	1	0	1986	—
(Germany) TuRU Düsseldorf	1	0	1989	—
(Soviet Union) SKIF Krasnodar	1	0	1990	—
(Socialist Federal Republic of Yugoslavia) RK Borac Banja Luka	1	0	1991	—
(Germany) SG Wallau-Massenheim	1	0	1992	—
(Spain) CB Cantabria	1	0	1993	—
(Spain) Alzira Avidesa	1	0	1994	—
(Germany) TUSEM Essen	1	0	2005	—
(Germany) HSG Nordhorn-Lingen	1	0	2008	—
(Germany) Rhein-Neckar Löwen	1	0	2013	—
(Hungary) SC Pick Szeged	1	0	2014	—
(Portugal) SL Benfica	1	0	2022	—
(Germany) MT Melsungen	1	0	2026	—
(France) HBC Nantes	0	2	—	2013, 2016
(France) Montpellier Handball	0	2	—	2014, 2025
(Socialist Federal Republic of Yugoslavia) RK Željezničar	0	1	—	1982
(Sweden) IFK Karlskrona	0	1	—	1983
(Denmark) HG Gladsaxe	0	1	—	1984
(Spain) Tecnisa Alicante	0	1	—	1986
(Spain) Atlético Madrid BM	0	1	—	1987
(East Germany) ASK Vorwärts Frankfurt	0	1	—	1989
(Socialist Federal Republic of Yugoslavia) RK Proleter Zrenjanin	0	1	—	1990
(Soviet Union) CSKA Moscow	0	1	—	1991
(Belarus) SKA Minsk	0	1	—	1992
(Germany) Bayer Dormagen	0	1	—	1993
(Austria) ASKÖ Linde Linz	0	1	—	1994
(Russia) Polyot Cheljabinsk	0	1	—	1995
(Ukraine) Shakhtar-Academiya	0	1	—	1996
(Denmark) Virum-Sorgenfri HK	0	1	—	1997
(Spain) BM Valladolid	0	1	—	1999
(Russia) Dynamo Astrakhan	0	1	—	2003
(Spain) BM Altea	0	1	—	2004
(Spain) CAI Aragón	0	1	—	2007
(Denmark) FCK Håndbold	0	1	—	2008
(Slovenia) RK Gorenje	0	1	—	2009
(Switzerland) Kadetten Schaffhausen	0	1	—	2010
(France) Dunkerque HB	0	1	—	2012
(Germany) HSV Hamburg	0	1	—	2015
(France) Saint-Raphaël Var Handball	0	1	—	2018

=== Titles by country ===
Rank	Country	Winners	Runners-up	Total finals
1	Germany	29	13	42
2	Spain	5	7	12
3	Soviet Union ^{[A]}	3	3	6
4	Romania	2	0	2
5	Hungary	2	0	2
6	Yugoslavia ^{[B]}	1	2	3
7	Croatia	1	1	2
8	Portugal	1	0	1
9	France	0	6	6
10	Denmark	0	3	3
11	Russia	0	2	2
12	Sweden	0	1	1
13	East Germany	0	1	1
14	Belarus	0	1	1
15	Austria	0	1	1
16	Ukraine	0	1	1
17	Slovenia	0	1	1
18	Switzerland	0	1	1

==== Notes ====
- ^{A} Results until the Dissolution of the Soviet Union in 1991. One club from present day Ukraine won the title once and was runner-up another time, one club from present day Lithuania also won the title once and was runner-up another time, while one title and an additional one time runner-up were achieved by two clubs from present day Russia.
- ^{B} Results until the Breakup of Yugoslavia in the early 1990s. One Club from present day Bosnia and Herzegovina won the title once and another was runner-up one time, while a club from present day Serbia was also runner-up one time.

== See also ==
- EHF Champions League
- EHF European Cup
