= CD Bidasoa =

Spanish handball club

Bidasoa Irun
- Full name: Club Deportivo Bidasoa Irun
- Founded: 1962; 64 years ago
- Arena: Polideportivo Artaleku, Irún
- Capacity: 2,200
- President: Gurutz Aguinagalde
- Head coach: Álex Mozas
- League: Liga ASOBAL
- 2024–25: 4th
- Club colours
Home	Away

CD Bidasoa Irun is a team of handball based in Irún, Spain. It plays in Liga ASOBAL.

Location of Bidasoa Irun

== History ==
The Basque club was founded in 1962. Five years after its foundation, CD Bidasoa managed to get promoted to the second division and after the 1969/1970 season it was promoted to the first division. Eight years was enough to reach the highest class. The team achieved its main successes with the support of the Elgorriaga chocolate company. In its home country, the club won the league a total of two times (1987, 1995), the Copa del Rey two times (1992, 1996), the ASOBAL Cup one time (1993) and the Supercopa ASOBAL one time (1996). The club won two international cups: EHF Champions League in 1995, EHF Cup Winner's Cup in 1997.

== Crest, colours, supporters ==
=== Naming history ===
Name	Period
CD Bidasoa	1962−1990
Elgorriaga Bidasoa	1990–2000
CD Bidasoa	2000–2004
Bidasoa Irun	2004–present

=== Kits ===
HOME
2012–13	2014-15

== Sports Hall information ==
- Name: – Polideportivo Artaleku
- City: – Irún
- Capacity: – 2200
- Address: – 30 Karrika Nagusia, 20304 Irún

== Management ==
Position	Name
President	(Spain) Gurutz Aguinagalde
Vice President	(Spain) Igor Barandiarán
Club manager	(Spain) Asier Zubiría

== Team ==
=== Current squad ===
Squad for the 2024–25 season

Bidasoa Irun

Goalkeepers

- 33 (Poland) Jakub Skrzyniarz
- 40 (Argentina) Leonel Maciel

Left Wingers

- 8 (Spain) Mikel Zabala
- 32 (Cuba) Dariel García

Right Wingers

- 2 (Spain) Iñaki Cavero
- 9 (France) Tao Gey-Emparan

Line Players

- 4 (Serbia) Marko Jevtić
- 11 (Chile) Esteban Salinas
- 28 (Brazil) Matheus Silva

Left Backs

- 10 (Spain) Eneko Furundarena
- 20 (Greece) Theodoros Boskos
- 22 (France) Alex Raix
- 39 (Spain) Asier Nieto
- 97 (Spain) Tito Díaz

Central Backs

- 23 (Spain) Asier Iribar
- 31 (Spain) Gorka Nieto
- 35 (Brazil) Pedro Pacheco

Right Backs

- 17 (Chile) Rodrigo Salinas
- 19 (Spain) Julen Múgica

=== Technical staff ===
- Head coach: (Spain) Álex Mozas
- Assistant coach: (Spain) Javier Campo

=== Transfers ===
Transfers for the 2026–27 season

Joining

- (Portugal) João Magalhães (LW) from (Portugal) FC Porto
- (Spain) Niko Mindegia (CB) from (France) Fenix Toulouse Handball
- (Spain) Asier Iribar (LB) back from loan at (Spain) BM Villa de Aranda
- (Poland) Jakub Sladkowski (LP) back from loan at (Spain) BM Villa de Aranda
- (Spain) Miguel Ángel Martín (RB) on loan from (Spain) FC Barcelona

Leaving

- (Chile) Rodrigo Salinas (RB) to (Spain) BM Proin Triana
- (Cuba) Dariel García (LW) to (Germany) MT Melsungen
- (Poland) Piotr Mielczarski (LB) to (France) Limoges Handball
- (Spain) Asier Iribar (LB) on loan at (Spain) BM Atlético Valladolid

=== Transfer History ===
Transfers for the 2025–26 season

Joining

- (Spain) Iñaki Peciña (LP) from (France) Chambéry SMBH
- (Spain) Xavier González (RW) from (Spain) Helvetia Anaitasuna
- (Spain) Mario Nevado (LB) from (Spain) Club Balonmano Nava
- (Spain) Xavi Tuà Hernández (LW) from (Spain) CB Ciudad de Logroño
- (Spain) Ignacio Vallés Becerra (CB) from (Spain) BM Benidorm
- (Poland) Jakub Sladkowski (LP) back from loan at (Spain) BM Guadalajara

Leaving

- (Greece) Theodoros Boskos (LB) to (Hungary) Budai Farkasok KKUK
- (Brazil) Pedro Pacheco (CB) to (France) Saran Loiret Handball
- (Spain) Asier Nieto Marcos (LB) to (France) Cesson Rennes MHB
- (Poland) Jakub Sladkowski (LP) on loan at (Spain) BM Villa de Aranda
- (Spain) Andoni Beraza (LB) to (Spain) Helvetia Anaitasuna
- (Spain) Asier Iribar (LB) on loan at (Spain) BM Villa de Aranda
- (Spain) Jon Iribar (LB) on loan at (Spain) Zaragoza Balonmano
- (France) Tao Gey-Emparán (RW) on loan at (Spain) Recoletas Atlético Valladolid

Transfers for the 2024–25 season

Joining

- (Argentina) Leonel Maciel (GK) from (Portugal) Sporting CP
- (Greece) Theodoros Boskos (LB) from (Spain) Ángel Ximénez Puente Genil
- (Poland) Piotr Mielczarski (LB) from (Poland) ZPRP Kielce

Leaving

- (Poland) Jakub Sladkowski (P) loan to (Spain) BM Guadalajara
- (Poland) Piotr Mielczarski (LB) loan to (Spain) BM Guadalajara
- (Spain) Xabier Barreto (LW) loan to (Spain) Eón Alicante
- (Spain) Julen Urruzola (LB) loan to (Spain) Eón Alicante
- (Tunisia) Mehdi Harbaoui (GK) to (France) Dunkerque

== Previous Squads ==
2019–2020 Team
Shirt No	Nationality	Player	Birth Date	Position
1	Brazil	Rangel Luan	11 May 1996 (age 30)	Goalkeeper
2	Spain	Iñaki Cavero	27 April 1996 (age 30)	Right Winger
4	Serbia	Miloš Orbović	2 November 1993 (age 32)	Right Back
6	Spain	Adrián Crowley	17 May 1988 (age 38)	Left Winger
8	Spain	Mikel Zabala	23 April 1998 (age 28)	Left Winger
11	Spain	Kauldi Odriozola	7 January 1997 (age 29)	Right Winger
12	Spain	Yon Gomez Iragorri	19 July 2000 (age 26)	Goalkeeper
15	Spain	Iker Serrano	22 June 1984 (age 42)	Line Player
16	Spain	Xoan Manuel Ledo	6 July 1996 (age 30)	Goalkeeper
17	Chile	Esteban Salinas	18 January 1992 (age 34)	Line Player
18	Spain	Jaime Mancisidor Vergara	19 April 2000 (age 26)	Right Winger
20	GermanyFrance	Paco Barthe-Spiess	15 September 1992 (age 34)	Left Back
21	Spain	Sergio De la Salud Novella	1 April 1985 (age 41)	Central Back
22	France	Léo Renaud-David	11 June 1987 (age 39)	Left Back
23	Chile	Rodrigo Salinas Muñoz	25 February 1989 (age 37)	Right Back
24	Spain	Martin Santano Estebanez	4 March 2002 (age 24)	Left Winger
25	Spain	Jon Azkue	3 July 1994 (age 32)	Central Back
26	Spain	Gorka Nieto Marcos	31 January 2002 (age 24)	Central Back
27	France	Thomas Tésorière	21 January 1989 (age 37)	Line Player
28	Brazil	Matheus Francisco da Silva	7 February 1998 (age 28)	Line Player
37	Hungary	Donát Bartók	13 July 1996 (age 30)	Right Back
51	France	Rudy Seri	2 April 1994 (age 32)	Left Back

2006–2007 Team
Shirt No	Nationality	Player	Birth Date	Position
1	Norway	Ole Erevik	9 January 1981 (age 45)	Goalkeeper
2	Spain	Julen Ventura	26 January 1987 (age 39)	Left Back
3	ChileItaly	Marco Oneto	3 June 1982 (age 44)	Line Player
4	Spain	Unai Arrieta Aizpurua	14 January 1981 (age 45)	Left Winger
5	Spain	Iñaki Peciña	31 May 1988 (age 38)	Line Player
6	Spain	Jose Manuel Garcia Moriñigo	3 February 1984 (age 42)	Right Winger
7	Serbia	Ivan Stanković	27 April 1982 (age 44)	Right Back
8	Poland	Dawid Nilsson	31 August 1977 (age 49)	Left Back
9	SpainRussia	Aleksandr Tiumentsev	4 October 1983 (age 43)	Central Back
11	Romania	Ionut Stefan Georgescu	16 June 1982 (age 44)	Right Winger
12	France	Arnaud Tabarand	25 February 1986 (age 40)	Goalkeeper
13	Slovenia	Nenad Bilbija	6 February 1984 (age 42)	Left Back
14	Bosnia and Herzegovina	Srđan Trivundža	19 March 1981 (age 45)	Central Back
15	France	Cyril Viudes	6 February 1982 (age 44)	Line Player
17	Spain	Asier Aramburu	2 January 1985 (age 41)	Left Winger
19	Hungary	Ákos Kis	31 December 1975 (age 50)	Left Back
21	Denmark	Mikkel Aagaard	6 November 1979 (age 46)	Left Winger

1995–1996 Team
Shirt No	Nationality	Player	Birth Date	Position
1	Spain	Gurutz Aguinagalde	26 October 1977 (age 49)	Goalkeeper
2	Spain	David Rodríguez	2 September 1975 (age 51)	Left Winger
3	Spain	Javier De la Haza	28 October 1971 (age 55)	Left Back
4	Italy	Ángel Fernández	5 December 1972 (age 53)	Left Winger
5	Spain	Ricardo Marín	28 April 1968 (age 58)	Central Back
8	Spain	Enrique Andreu Lluch	5 August 1970 (age 56)	Left Winger
9	Serbia	Nenad Peruničić	1 May 1971 (age 55)	Left Back
10	Spain	Armand Rubiño	5 September 1968 (age 58)	Right Winger
12	Spain	Javier Barreto	9 February 1975 (age 51)	Goalkeeper
13	Spain	Ignacio Pujol	6 April 1971 (age 55)	Line Player
14	Spain	Iñaki Ordoñez	20 August 1968 (age 58)	Right Back
15	Russia	Oleg Kisselev	11 January 1967 (age 59)	Central Back
16	Spain	Jordi Nuñez	19 September 1968 (age 58)	Goalkeeper
18	Spain	Aitor Etxaburu	17 June 1966 (age 60)	Line Player

1994–1995 Team
Shirt No	Nationality	Player	Birth Date	Position
1	Sweden	Tomas Svensson	15 February 1968 (age 58)	Goalkeeper
2	Spain	David Rodríguez	2 September 1975 (age 51)	Left Winger
3	Spain	Javier De la Haza	28 October 1971 (age 55)	Left Back
4	Italy	Ángel Fernández	5 December 1972 (age 53)	Left Winger
8	Spain	Fernando Fernández Urosa	5 January 1971 (age 55)	Central Back
9	Serbia	Nenad Peruničić	1 May 1971 (age 55)	Left Back
10	Spain	Armand Rubiño	5 September 1968 (age 58)	Right Winger
11	Spain	Ignacio Pujol	6 April 1971 (age 55)	Line Player
12	Spain	Javier Barreto	9 February 1975 (age 51)	Goalkeeper
13	Spain	Fernando Bolea	29 May 1965 (age 61)	Left Winger
14	Spain	Iñaki Ordoñez	20 August 1968 (age 58)	Right Back
15	Russia	Oleg Kisselev	11 January 1967 (age 59)	Central Back
18	Spain	Aitor Etxaburu	17 June 1966 (age 60)	Line Player

== Trophies ==
- Liga ASOBAL: 2
  - Winners: 1986–87, 1994–95
  - Runners-Up: 1993–94, 2018–19
- Copa del Rey: 2
  - Winners: 1991–92, 1995–96
  - Runners-Up: 1992–93
- ASOBAL Cup: 1
  - Winners: 1992–93
  - Runners-Up: 1991–92, 2018–19, 2019–20
- Supercopa ASOBAL: 1
  - Winners: 1995–96
  - Runners-Up: 1993–94, 1996–97
- EHF Champions League: 1
  - Winners: 1994–95
  - Runners-Up: 1995–96
- EHF Cup Winner's Cup: 1
  - Winners: 1996–97
  - Runners-Up: 1990–91

== EHF ranking ==
As of 10/22/2026

Rank	Team	Points
22	(Denmark) Skanderborg AGF Håndbold	180
23	(Norway) Elverum Håndball	175
24	(Portugal) SL Benfica	172
25	(Spain) Bidasoa Irun	168
26	(Germany) TSV Hannover-Burgdorf	165
27	(Spain) BM Granollers	163
28	(Slovenia) Celje Pivovarna Laško	162

== Former club members ==
=== Notable former players ===
- (Spain) Gurutz Aguinagalde (1995-2005)
- (Spain) Julen Aguinagalde (1999-2006, 2020–)
- (Spain) Asier Antonio (1997-2002)
- (Spain) Fernando Bolea (1990–1995)
- (Spain) Adrián Crowley (2005-2006, 2011–2021)
- (Spain) Aitor Etxaburu (1993–2001)
- (Spain) (Cuba) Julio Fis (1999–2000)
- (Spain) Xoan Manuel Ledo (2017–2022)
- (Spain) Yeray Lamariano (2007–2009)
- (Spain) Asier Nieto Marcos (2022–)
- (Spain) Jordi Nuñez (1995–1997)
- (Spain) Kauldi Odriozola (2016–2022)
- (Spain) Jesús Olalla (1985-1993, 1996–1998)
- (Spain) Iñaki Peciña (2005–2010)
- (Spain) Jose Manuel Sierra (2020–2022)
- (Argentina) Nicolás Bonanno (2020–2021)
- (Argentina) Gastón Mouriño (2015–2016)
- (Argentina) Agustín Vidal (2013–2014)
- (Bosnia and Herzegovina) Peđa Dejanović (2014–2017)
- (Bosnia and Herzegovina) Senjanin Maglajlija (1997–1998)
- (Brazil) Rangel Luan (2017–2020)
- (Chile) (Italy) Marco Oneto (2005–2007)
- (Chile) Esteban Salinas (2018–2020)
- (Chile) Rodrigo Salinas Muñoz (2017–)
- (Croatia) Bruno Gudelj (1998–1999)
- (Denmark) Mikkel Aagaard (2007)
- (France) Patrick Cazal (1999–2002)
- (France) Olivier Girault (1998–1999)
- (France) (Tunisia) Mehdi Harbaoui (2022–)
- (France) Christophe Kempé (1999–2001)
- (France) Sébastien Quintallet (2007)
- (France) Cyril Viudes (2005–2007)
- (France) Semir Zuzo (1998–1999)
- (Hungary) Donát Bartók (2020–2021)
- (Iceland) Heiðmar Felixson (2002–2004)
- (Iceland) Alfreð Gíslason (1989–1991)
- (Iceland) Patrekur Jóhannesson (2003–2004)
- (Iceland) Júlíus Jónasson (1991–1992)
- (Lithuania) Rolandas Bernatonis (2009-2011)
- (Montenegro) (Serbia) Ratko Đurković (2003–2004)
- (Norway) Ole Erevik (2005–2007)
- (Norway) André Jørgensen (2003–2006)
- (Poland) Dawid Nilsson (2005–2007)
- (Poland) Jakub Skrzyniarz (2022–)
- (Poland) (Germany) Bogdan Wenta (1989–1993)
- (Romania) Dan Racoțea (2020-2021)
- (Russia) Oleg Khodkov (2001–2003)
- (Russia) Oleg Kisselev (1994–1996)
- (Russia) Yuri Nesterov (2003–2004)
- (Russia) Mikhail Revin (2014–2015)
- (Slovenia) Nenad Bilbija (2006–2007)
- (Serbia) Mladen Bojinović (2000–2001)
- (Serbia) Jovica Cvetković (1988–1989)
- (Serbia) Časlav Grubić (1986–1988)
- (Serbia) Nedeljko Jovanović (1993–1994)
- (Serbia) Jovan Kovačević (1997–1998)
- (Serbia) Miloš Orbović (2019–2020)
- (Serbia) Nenad Peruničić (1994–1997)
- (Serbia) Ivan Stanković (2004–2007)
- (Serbia) Vladica Stojanović (2004-2006)
- (Sweden) Tomas Svensson (1992–1995)
- (Uruguay) (Spain) Máximo Cancio (2008–2009)

=== Former coaches ===
Seasons	Coach	Country
1975–1997	Juantxo Villarreal	(Spain)
1997–1999	Ivan Sopalović	(Serbia)
1999	Mario Hernández	(Spain)
1999–2002	Julián Ruiz	(Spain)
2002–2003	Aitor Etxaburu	(Spain)
2003–2004	Jordi Ribera	(Spain)
2004–2007	Julián Ruiz	(Spain)
2007–2010	Aitor Etxaburu	(Spain)
2010–2012	Fernando Herrero	(Spain)
2012–2016	Fernando Bolea	(Spain)
2016–	Jacobo Cuétara	(Spain)
