= CB Alzira =

Spanish handball club

Avidesa Alzira
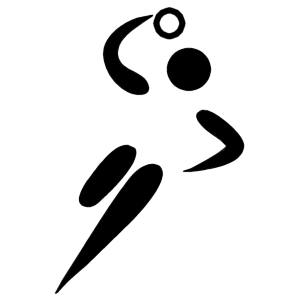
- Full name: Club Balonmano Alzira
- Founded: 1989
- Dissolved: 1995
- Arena: Palacio de los Deportes, Alzira, Spain
- Capacity: 2,800
- 1994–95: Liga ASOBAL, 10th
Home	Away

Club Balonmano Alzira was a Spanish handball team based in Alzira, Spain. CB Alzira achieved two great trophies before it was dissolved in 1995.

The club was founded in 1989 when a club located in Valencia city, Caixa Valencia was relocated to Alzira and renamed as Avidesa Alzira. The club was dissolved in July 1995, due to huge committed debts with its players.

== Trophies ==
- Copa del Rey: 1
  - Winners: 1991–92
- EHF Cup: 1
  - Winners: 1993–94

== Notable players ==
- (Iceland) Geir Sveinsson
- (Romania) Vasile Stîngă
- (Romania) Maricel Voinea
- (Spain) (Ukraine) Andrei Xepkin
- (Spain) Jaume Fort
- (Socialist Federal Republic of Yugoslavia) Dragan Škrbić
