= 2026–27 Liga ASOBAL =

37th season of the Liga ASOBAL

Liga ASOBAL
- Season: 2026–27
- Dates: 11 September 2026 – 6 June 2027
- Matches: 25
- Goals: 1,617 (64.68 per match)
- Top goalscorer: Gonzalo Pérez (53 goals)

The 2026–27 Liga ASOBAL is the 37th season of the Liga ASOBAL, Spain's premier handball league. The season began on 11 September 2026 and will conclude on 6 June 2027.

== Teams ==
2026–27 Liga Asobal teams

=== Team changes ===
Promoted from 2025–26 División de Plata de Balonmano	Relegated from 2025–26 Liga ASOBAL
Cajasol Sevilla BM Proin; Fertiberia Puerto Sagunto	Bada Huesca; Sanicentro BM Guadalajara

=== Stadiums ===
Team	City	Venue	Capacity
Abanca Ademar León	León	Pabellón Municipal de los Deportes	6,000
Ángel Ximénez Puente Genil	Puente Genil	Pabellón Municipal Alcalde Miguel Salas	900
Bathco BM Torrelavega	Torrelavega	Pabellón Municipal Vicente Trueba	2,400
BM Caserío Ciudad Real	Ciudad Real	Quijote Arena	5,500
BM Logroño La Rioja	Logroño	Palacio de los Deportes de La Rioja	3,809
Cajasol Sevilla BM Proin	Seville	Pabellón de Amate	1,595
FC Barcelona	Barcelona	Palau Blaugrana	7,234
Fertiberia Puerto Sagunto	Sagunto	Pabellón Municipal Port de Sagunt	2,150
Fraikin BM Granollers	Granollers	Palau d'Esports de Granollers	6,000
Frigoríficos del Morrazo	Cangas do Morrazo	Pabellón Municipal de O Gatañal	2,500
Horneo Eón Alicante	Alicante	Pabellón Pitiu Rochel	1,780
Irudek Bidasoa Irún	Irún	Polideportivo Artaleku	2,500
Rebi Balonmano Cuenca	Cuenca	Pabellón Municipal El Sargal	1,800
Recoletas Atlético Valladolid	Valladolid	Polideportivo Huerta del Rey	3,550
Tubos Aranda Villa de Aranda	Aranda de Duero	Pabellón Santiago Manguán	2,800
Viveros Herol BM Nava	Nava de la Asunción	Pabellón Municipal Guerrer@s Naver@s	900

== League table ==
Pos	Team	Pld	W	D	L	GF	GA	GD	Pts	Qualification or relegation
1	Irudek Bidasoa Irún	8	8	0	0	283	243	+40	16	Qualification for the Champions League group stage
2	FC Barcelona	7	7	0	0	291	203	+88	14	Qualification for the European League group stage
3	Recoletas Atlético Valladolid	8	6	1	1	265	232	+33	13	Qualification for the European League group stage
4	BM Logroño La Rioja	8	5	2	1	275	265	+10	12	Qualification for the European League group stage
5	Bathco BM Torrelavega	8	5	1	2	250	223	+27	11	Qualification for the European League group stage
6	Fraikin BM Granollers	8	5	1	2	263	255	+8	11	
7	BM Caserío Ciudad Real	7	3	2	2	221	220	+1	8	
8	Abanca Ademar León	8	3	0	5	280	283	−3	6	
9	Cajasol Sevilla BM Proin	8	3	0	5	253	268	−15	6	
10	Rebi Balonmano Cuenca	8	2	2	4	260	279	−19	6	
11	Horneo Eón Alicante	8	3	0	5	239	265	−26	6	
12	Fertiberia Puerto Sagunto	8	2	1	5	237	240	−3	5	
13	Tubos Aranda Villa de Aranda	8	1	2	5	238	270	−32	4	
14	Ángel Ximénez Puente Genil	8	1	1	6	230	266	−36	3	Relegation playoffs
15	Viveros Herol BM Nava	8	1	1	6	242	288	−46	3	Relegation to División de Plata
16	Frigoríficos del Morrazo	8	1	0	7	252	279	−27	2	Relegation to División de Plata

Updated to match(es) played on 1 November 2026. Source: ASOBAL
Rules for classification: 1) points; 2) head-to-head points; 3) head-to-head goal difference; 4) head-to-head number of goals scored; 5) goal difference; 6) goals scored.

== Results ==
Home \ Away	ADE	PGE	TLV	CAS	LOG	SEV	BAR	PSG	GRA	CNG	EON	BID	CQN	ATV	VDA	NAV
Abanca Ademar León	—									33–32		33–37	32–35		40–35	36–38
Ángel Ximénez Puente Genil		—	28–35		32–32		27–39								32–34	
Bathco BM Torrelavega			—			37–33				28–31					28–21	33–19
BM Caserío Ciudad Real	35–33			—	29–29				34–33		35–29					
BM Logroño La Rioja					—		32–48	36–32		39–32						
Cajasol Sevilla BM Proin		30–31			27–33	—		29–28	29–31							
FC Barcelona							—				46–31		45–27			
Fertiberia Puerto Sagunto	39–38							—	24–27		18–22					39–24
Fraikin BM Granollers		32–31					25–36		—	38–34						
Frigoríficos del Morrazo							28–37			—	27–31	32–33		36–40		
Horneo Eón Alicante	32–35		32–29						31–41		—	31–34				
Irudek Bidasoa Irún		31–25		36–32		38–33						—				35–25
Rebi Balonmano Cuenca			31–31		32–36	36–37							—	26–28		
Recoletas Atlético Valladolid		33–24	28–29	30–26				37–30						—	34–26	
Tubos Aranda Villa de Aranda				30–30			33–40	27–27				32–39			—	
Viveros Herol BM Nava					33–38	34–35							34–37	35–35		—

Updated to match(es) played on 1 November 2026. Source: ASOBAL
Legend: Blue = home team win; Yellow = draw; Red = away team win.

== Top goalscorers ==
Rank	Player	Club	Goals
1	(Spain) Gonzalo Pérez	Abanca Ademar León	53
2	(Spain) Antonio Capitán	Fertiberia Puerto Sagunto	50
3	(Spain) Mario Nevado	Irudek Bidasoa Irún	40
4	(Hungary) Rajmund Tóth	Rebi Balonmano Cuenca	38
5	(France) Tao Gey-Emparan	Recoletas Atlético Valladolid	36
6	(Spain) Miguel Martínez	BM Logroño La Rioja	35
7	(Spain) Chema Márquez	Cajasol Sevilla BM Proin	33
7	(Cuba) Samuel Cordiés	Tubos Aranda Villa de Aranda	33
7	(Poland) Patryk Wasiak	Abanca Ademar León	33
10	(Slovakia) Jakub Prokop	Bathco BM Torrelavega	32
10	(Denmark) Pelle Motzkus Boesen	Frigoríficos del Morrazo	32
