= 2026–27 EHF European League group stage =

The 2026–27 EHF European League group stage will be played between 29 September and 2 December 2026 to determine the sixteen teams advancing to the play-offs of the 2026–27 EHF European League.

== Format ==
In each group, teams played against each other in a double round-robin format, with home and away matches. The top two qualify for the play-offs.

== Draw ==
External videos
- Draw

The draw took place on the at 11:00 CET in Vienna on 17 July 2026. The only restriction was that no clubs from the same country cannot be in the same group.

Key to colours
Teams advancing to the Play-offs

Pot 1
Team
(Bosnia and Herzegovina) HC Izviđač
(Croatia) RK Nexe
(Spain) Irudek Bidasoa Irún
(Germany) SG Flensburg-Handewitt
(Hungary) MOL Tatabánya KC
(North Macedonia) HC Eurofarm Pelister
(Portugal) SL Benfica
(Sweden) IK Sävehof

Pot 2
Team
(Czech Republic) HCB Karviná
(Spain) Fraikin BM Granollers
(France) Limoges Handball
(Germany) VfL Gummersbach
(Iceland) Valur
(Norway) Elverum Håndball
(Switzerland) Kadetten Schaffhausen
(Slovakia) Tatran Prešov

Pot 3
Team
(Croatia) MRK Sesvete
(Spain) Fenix Toulouse
(Spain) BM Logroño La Rioja
(Spain) Bathco BM Torrelavega
(France) Chambéry SMB HB
(France) Saint-Raphaël Var Handball
(Romania) HC Buzău
(Slovenia) RD LL Grosist Slovan

Pot 4
Team
(Denmark) Mors-Thy Håndbold
(Denmark) TTH Holstebro
(Germany) Bergischer HC
(Poland) PGE Wybrzeże Gdańsk
(Portugal) Águas Santas
(Portugal) Madeira Andebol SAD
(Romania) CSM București
(Sweden) Hammarby IF

== Tiebreakers ==
In the group stage, teams were ranked according to points (2 points for a win, 1 point for a draw, 0 points for a loss), and if tied on points, the following tiebreaking criteria were applied, in the order given, to determine the rankings:

1. Points in matches among tied teams;
2. Goal difference in matches among tied teams;
3. Goal difference in all group matches;
4. Goals scored in all group matches;
5. If more than two teams were tied, and after applying all head-to-head criteria above, a subset of teams were still tied, all head-to-head criteria above were reapplied exclusively to this subset of teams;
6. Drawing lots.

== Groups ==
All times are local.

=== Group A ===
Pos	Team	Pld	W	D	L	GF	GA	GD	Pts	Qualification	NEX	HAM	ELV	SRA
1	(Croatia) RK Nexe	4	3	0	1	138	125	+13	6	Play-offs	—	–	38–23	33–26
2	(Sweden) Hammarby IF	4	3	0	1	126	124	+2	6	Play-offs	30–28	—	–	34–26
3	(Norway) Elverum Håndball	4	2	0	2	142	137	+5	4		37–39	37–28	—	–
4	(France) Saint-Raphaël Var Handball (E)	4	0	0	4	117	137	−20	0		–	33–34	32–36	—

Updated to match(es) played on 17 November 2026. Source: EHF
Rules for classification: Tiebreakers
(E) Eliminated

29 September 2026; 20:45	RK Nexe (Croatia)	33–26	(France) Saint-Raphaël Var Handball	OS Kralja Tomislava, Našice; Attendance: 1,500; Referees: Horváth, Marton (HUN)
29 September 2026; 20:45	Lučin 7	(17–13)	Mohamed 7	OS Kralja Tomislava, Našice; Attendance: 1,500; Referees: Horváth, Marton (HUN)
29 September 2026; 20:45	1× (yellow card) 7× (suspension)	Report	1× (yellow card) 6× (suspension)	OS Kralja Tomislava, Našice; Attendance: 1,500; Referees: Horváth, Marton (HUN)

29 September 2026; 20:45	Elverum Håndball (Norway)	37–28	(Sweden) Hammarby IF	Terningen Arena, Elverum; Attendance: 1,710; Referees: Pagh, Thygesen (DEN)
29 September 2026; 20:45	Pedersen 14	(17–13)	Dolk 7	Terningen Arena, Elverum; Attendance: 1,710; Referees: Pagh, Thygesen (DEN)
29 September 2026; 20:45	1× (yellow card) 1× (suspension)	Report	2× (yellow card) 6× (suspension) 1× (red card)	Terningen Arena, Elverum; Attendance: 1,710; Referees: Pagh, Thygesen (DEN)

6 October 2026; 18:45	Hammarby IF (Sweden)	30–28	(Croatia) RK Nexe	Eriksdalshallen, Stockholm; Attendance: 1,421; Referees: Fotakidis, Kinatzidis (GRE)
6 October 2026; 18:45	Stenmalm 8	(16–15)	Lučin 6	Eriksdalshallen, Stockholm; Attendance: 1,421; Referees: Fotakidis, Kinatzidis (GRE)
6 October 2026; 18:45	5× (suspension)	Report	3× (suspension)	Eriksdalshallen, Stockholm; Attendance: 1,421; Referees: Fotakidis, Kinatzidis (GRE)

6 October 2026; 20:45	Saint-Raphaël Var Handball (France)	32–36	(Norway) Elverum Håndball	Palais des Sports JF Krakowski, Saint-Raphaël; Attendance: 1,100; Referees: Pirvu, Potirniche (ROU)
6 October 2026; 20:45	Mohamed, Marescot 6	(15–20)	Pedersen 11	Palais des Sports JF Krakowski, Saint-Raphaël; Attendance: 1,100; Referees: Pirvu, Potirniche (ROU)
6 October 2026; 20:45	1× (yellow card) 4× (suspension) 1× (red card)	Report	2× (suspension)	Palais des Sports JF Krakowski, Saint-Raphaël; Attendance: 1,100; Referees: Pirvu, Potirniche (ROU)

13 October 2026; 18:45	Elverum Håndball (Norway)	37–39	(Croatia) RK Nexe	Terningen Arena, Elverum; Attendance: 1,633; Referees: Cipov, Klus (SVK)
13 October 2026; 18:45	Gulliksen 15	(18–18)	Lučin 9	Terningen Arena, Elverum; Attendance: 1,633; Referees: Cipov, Klus (SVK)
13 October 2026; 18:45	1× (suspension)	Report	1× (yellow card) 7× (suspension)	Terningen Arena, Elverum; Attendance: 1,633; Referees: Cipov, Klus (SVK)

13 October 2026; 18:45	Hammarby IF (Sweden)	34–26	(France) Saint-Raphaël Var Handball	Eriksdalshallen, Stockholm; Attendance: 1,575; Referees: Mitrevski, Todorovski (MKD)
13 October 2026; 18:45	Stenmalm 8	(18–15)	Kouadio 6	Eriksdalshallen, Stockholm; Attendance: 1,575; Referees: Mitrevski, Todorovski (MKD)
13 October 2026; 18:45	1× (yellow card) 4× (suspension)	Report	3× (suspension)	Eriksdalshallen, Stockholm; Attendance: 1,575; Referees: Mitrevski, Todorovski (MKD)

17 November 2026; 18:45	RK Nexe (Croatia)	38–32	(Norway) Elverum Håndball	OS Kralja Tomislava, Našice; Attendance: 2,000; Referees: Antic, Jakovljevic (SRB)
17 November 2026; 18:45	Lučin 12	(15–12)	Gulliksen 8	OS Kralja Tomislava, Našice; Attendance: 2,000; Referees: Antic, Jakovljevic (SRB)
17 November 2026; 18:45	6× (suspension)	Report	2× (suspension)	OS Kralja Tomislava, Našice; Attendance: 2,000; Referees: Antic, Jakovljevic (SRB)

17 November 2026; 18:45	Saint-Raphaël Var Handball (France)	33–34	(Sweden) Hammarby IF	Palais des Sports JF Krakowski, Saint-Raphaël; Attendance: 1,088; Referees: Fabryczny, Rawicki (POL)
17 November 2026; 18:45	Gorgibus, Leyvigne 7	(16–13)	Lennernäs 8	Palais des Sports JF Krakowski, Saint-Raphaël; Attendance: 1,088; Referees: Fabryczny, Rawicki (POL)
17 November 2026; 18:45	2× (suspension)	Report	1× (yellow card) 5× (suspension)	Palais des Sports JF Krakowski, Saint-Raphaël; Attendance: 1,088; Referees: Fabryczny, Rawicki (POL)

24 November 2026; 20:45	Saint-Raphaël Var Handball (France)	–	RK Nexe (Croatia)	Palais des Sports JF Krakowski, Saint-Raphaël; Referees: Pagh, Thygesen (DEN)
24 November 2026; 20:45		(–)		Palais des Sports JF Krakowski, Saint-Raphaël; Referees: Pagh, Thygesen (DEN)
24 November 2026; 20:45		Report		Palais des Sports JF Krakowski, Saint-Raphaël; Referees: Pagh, Thygesen (DEN)

24 November 2026; 20:45	Hammarby IF (Sweden)	–	(Norway) Elverum Håndball	Eriksdalshallen, Stockholm; Referees: Hellbusch, Jansen (GER)
24 November 2026; 20:45		(–)		Eriksdalshallen, Stockholm; Referees: Hellbusch, Jansen (GER)
24 November 2026; 20:45		Report		Eriksdalshallen, Stockholm; Referees: Hellbusch, Jansen (GER)

1 December 2026; 18:45	RK Nexe (Croatia)	–	(Sweden) Hammarby IF	OS Kralja Tomislava, Našice
1 December 2026; 18:45		(–)		OS Kralja Tomislava, Našice
1 December 2026; 18:45		Report		OS Kralja Tomislava, Našice

1 December 2026; 18:45	Elverum Håndball (Norway)	–	(France) Saint-Raphaël Var Handball	Terningen Arena, Elverum
1 December 2026; 18:45		(–)		Terningen Arena, Elverum
1 December 2026; 18:45		Report		Terningen Arena, Elverum

=== Group B ===
Pos	Team	Pld	W	D	L	GF	GA	GD	Pts	Qualification	MAD	LIM	BID	FHH
1	(Portugal) Madeira Andebol SAD	4	3	0	1	146	128	+18	6	Play-offs	—	–	40–32	37–29
2	(France) Limoges Handball	4	3	0	1	142	126	+16	6	Play-offs	31–30	—	32–28	–
3	(Spain) Irudek Bidasoa Irún	4	2	0	2	134	142	−8	4		–	35–33	—	39–37
4	(Iceland) FH Hafnarfjordur (E)	4	0	0	4	135	161	−26	0		36–39	33–46	–	—

Updated to match(es) played on 17 November 2026. Source: EHF
Rules for classification: Tiebreakers
(E) Eliminated

30 September 2026; 20:45	Irudek Bidasoa Irún (Spain)	39–37	(Iceland) FH Hafnarfjordur	Polideportivo Artaleku, Irun; Attendance: 962; Referees: Lončar, Lončar (CRO)
30 September 2026; 20:45	Salinas 9	(18–14)	Arndal, Guðjónsson 8	Polideportivo Artaleku, Irun; Attendance: 962; Referees: Lončar, Lončar (CRO)
30 September 2026; 20:45	4× (suspension)	Report	4× (suspension)	Polideportivo Artaleku, Irun; Attendance: 962; Referees: Lončar, Lončar (CRO)

30 September 2026; 20:45	Limoges Handball (France)	31–30	(Portugal) Madeira Andebol SAD	Palais des Sports de Beaublanc, Limoges; Attendance: 3,850; Referees: Stancu (ROM), Pepe (ITA)
30 September 2026; 20:45	Ogando 5	(18–13)	Costa da Silva 8	Palais des Sports de Beaublanc, Limoges; Attendance: 3,850; Referees: Stancu (ROM), Pepe (ITA)
30 September 2026; 20:45		Report	1× (yellow card) 3× (suspension) 1× (red card)	Palais des Sports de Beaublanc, Limoges; Attendance: 3,850; Referees: Stancu (ROM), Pepe (ITA)

6 October 2026; 18:45	FH Hafnarfjordur (Iceland)	33–46	(France) Limoges Handball	Kaplakriki, Hafnarfjörður; Attendance: 714; Referees: Beňuš, Uhlíř (CZE)
6 October 2026; 18:45	Ólafsson 8	(16–27)	Mielczarski 7	Kaplakriki, Hafnarfjörður; Attendance: 714; Referees: Beňuš, Uhlíř (CZE)
6 October 2026; 18:45	6× (suspension)	Report	5× (suspension)	Kaplakriki, Hafnarfjörður; Attendance: 714; Referees: Beňuš, Uhlíř (CZE)

6 October 2026; 19:45	Madeira Andebol SAD (Portugal)	40–32	(Spain) Irudek Bidasoa Irún	Pavilhao do CS Maritimo, Madeira; Attendance: 600; Referees: Hellbusch, Jansen (GER)
6 October 2026; 19:45	Pina 10	(20–13)	González 8	Pavilhao do CS Maritimo, Madeira; Attendance: 600; Referees: Hellbusch, Jansen (GER)
6 October 2026; 19:45	3× (suspension)	Report		Pavilhao do CS Maritimo, Madeira; Attendance: 600; Referees: Hellbusch, Jansen (GER)

13 October 2026; 19:45	Madeira Andebol SAD (Portugal)	37–29	(Iceland) FH Hafnarfjordur	Pavilhao do CS Maritimo, Madeira; Attendance: 977; Referees: Altmar, Horvath (HUN)
13 October 2026; 19:45	Pina 9	(22–11)	three players 4	Pavilhao do CS Maritimo, Madeira; Attendance: 977; Referees: Altmar, Horvath (HUN)
13 October 2026; 19:45		Report	2× (suspension)	Pavilhao do CS Maritimo, Madeira; Attendance: 977; Referees: Altmar, Horvath (HUN)

13 October 2026; 20:45	Limoges Handball (France)	32–28	(Spain) Irudek Bidasoa Irún	Palais des Sports de Beaublanc, Limoges; Attendance: 3,700; Referees: Boricic, Markovic (SRB)
13 October 2026; 20:45	Pelayo 6	(16–13)	Nevado 5	Palais des Sports de Beaublanc, Limoges; Attendance: 3,700; Referees: Boricic, Markovic (SRB)
13 October 2026; 20:45	1× (yellow card) 2× (suspension)	Report	4× (suspension)	Palais des Sports de Beaublanc, Limoges; Attendance: 3,700; Referees: Boricic, Markovic (SRB)

17 November 2026; 19:45	FH Hafnarfjordur (Iceland)	36–39	(Portugal) Madeira Andebol SAD	Kaplakriki, Hafnarfjörður; Attendance: 450; Referees: Bogdanovs, Cernavskis (LAT)
17 November 2026; 19:45	Guðjónsson 10	(22–18)	Pina 9	Kaplakriki, Hafnarfjörður; Attendance: 450; Referees: Bogdanovs, Cernavskis (LAT)
17 November 2026; 19:45	2× (suspension) 1× (red card)	Report	1× (yellow card) 2× (suspension)	Kaplakriki, Hafnarfjörður; Attendance: 450; Referees: Bogdanovs, Cernavskis (LAT)

17 November 2026; 20:45	Irudek Bidasoa Irún (Spain)	35–33	(France) Limoges Handball	Polideportivo Artaleku, Irun; Attendance: 1,316; Referees: Kull, Tint (EST)
17 November 2026; 20:45	three players 6	(18–17)	Ogando 12	Polideportivo Artaleku, Irun; Attendance: 1,316; Referees: Kull, Tint (EST)
17 November 2026; 20:45	1× (yellow card) 3× (suspension)	Report	5× (suspension)	Polideportivo Artaleku, Irun; Attendance: 1,316; Referees: Kull, Tint (EST)

24 November 2026; 19:45	FH Hafnarfjordur (Iceland)	–	(Spain) Irudek Bidasoa Irún	Kaplakriki, Hafnarfjörður; Referees: Pirvu, Potirniche (ROU)
24 November 2026; 19:45		(–)		Kaplakriki, Hafnarfjörður; Referees: Pirvu, Potirniche (ROU)
24 November 2026; 19:45		Report		Kaplakriki, Hafnarfjörður; Referees: Pirvu, Potirniche (ROU)

24 November 2026; 19:45	Madeira Andebol SAD (Portugal)	–	(France) Limoges Handball	Pavilhao do CS Maritimo, Madeira; Referees: Budzák, Záhradník (SVK)
24 November 2026; 19:45		(–)		Pavilhao do CS Maritimo, Madeira; Referees: Budzák, Záhradník (SVK)
24 November 2026; 19:45		Report		Pavilhao do CS Maritimo, Madeira; Referees: Budzák, Záhradník (SVK)

1 December 2026; 20:45	Irudek Bidasoa Irún (Spain)	–	(Portugal) Madeira Andebol SAD	Polideportivo Artaleku, Irun
1 December 2026; 20:45		(–)		Polideportivo Artaleku, Irun
1 December 2026; 20:45		Report		Polideportivo Artaleku, Irun

1 December 2026; 20:45	Limoges Handball (France)	–	(Iceland) FH Hafnarfjordur	Palais des Sports de Beaublanc, Limoges
1 December 2026; 20:45		(–)		Palais des Sports de Beaublanc, Limoges
1 December 2026; 20:45		Report		Palais des Sports de Beaublanc, Limoges

=== Group C ===
Pos	Team	Pld	W	D	L	GF	GA	GD	Pts	Qualification	KAD	RKI	CHA	BUC
1	(Switzerland) Kadetten Schaffhausen (Q)	4	4	0	0	150	119	+31	8	Play-offs	—	42–30	–	39–32
2	(Bosnia and Herzegovina) RK Izviđač	4	2	0	2	118	133	−15	4	Play-offs	29–34	—	34–33	–
3	(France) Chambéry SMB HB	4	1	0	3	126	129	−3	2		28–35	–	—	32–35
4	(Romania) CSM București	4	1	0	3	116	129	−13	2		–	24–25	25–33	—

Updated to match(es) played on 17 November 2026. Source: EHF
Rules for classification: Tiebreakers
(Q) Qualified for the phase indicated

29 September 2026; 18:45	RK Izviđač (Bosnia and Herzegovina)	34–33	(France) Chambéry SMB HB	Sportska Dvorana Ljubuški, Ljubuški; Attendance: 3,000; Referees: Serdiuc, Sîrbu (MDA)
29 September 2026; 18:45	Šahinović 7	(19–17)	Claude, Vanègue 7	Sportska Dvorana Ljubuški, Ljubuški; Attendance: 3,000; Referees: Serdiuc, Sîrbu (MDA)
29 September 2026; 18:45	2× (suspension)	Report	1× (suspension)	Sportska Dvorana Ljubuški, Ljubuški; Attendance: 3,000; Referees: Serdiuc, Sîrbu (MDA)

30 September 2026; 18:45	Kadetten Schaffhausen (Switzerland)	39–32	(Romania) CSM București	BBC Arena, Schaffhausen; Attendance: 1,083; Referees: Backović, Palačković (SLO)
30 September 2026; 18:45	Ríkharðsson 14	(16–16)	Drăgan 12	BBC Arena, Schaffhausen; Attendance: 1,083; Referees: Backović, Palačković (SLO)
30 September 2026; 18:45	2× (suspension)	Report	1× (yellow card) 2× (suspension)	BBC Arena, Schaffhausen; Attendance: 1,083; Referees: Backović, Palačković (SLO)

6 October 2026; 18:45	Kadetten Schaffhausen (Switzerland)	42–30	(Bosnia and Herzegovina) RK Izviđač	BBC Arena, Schaffhausen; Attendance: 1,145; Referees: Fält, Holm (SWE)
6 October 2026; 18:45	Ríkharðsson, Maros 9	(23–11)	Melić 7	BBC Arena, Schaffhausen; Attendance: 1,145; Referees: Fält, Holm (SWE)
6 October 2026; 18:45		Report	4× (suspension)	BBC Arena, Schaffhausen; Attendance: 1,145; Referees: Fält, Holm (SWE)

6 October 2026; 19:45	CSM București (Romania)	25–33	(France) Chambéry SMB HB	Dinamo Polyvalent Hall, Bucharest; Referees: Budzák, Záhradník (SVK)
6 October 2026; 19:45	Drăgan 6	(14–17)	Vanègue 8	Dinamo Polyvalent Hall, Bucharest; Referees: Budzák, Záhradník (SVK)
6 October 2026; 19:45	4× (suspension)	Report	1× (yellow card) 3× (suspension)	Dinamo Polyvalent Hall, Bucharest; Referees: Budzák, Záhradník (SVK)

13 October 2026; 18:45	Chambéry SMB HB (France)	28–35	(Switzerland) Kadetten Schaffhausen	Le Phare, Chambéry; Attendance: 2,315; Referees: Mitrovic, Vesovic (MNE)
13 October 2026; 18:45	Zammit, Vanègue 5	(13–16)	Ríkharðsson 10	Le Phare, Chambéry; Attendance: 2,315; Referees: Mitrovic, Vesovic (MNE)
13 October 2026; 18:45	1× (yellow card) 5× (suspension) 1× (red card)	Report	1× (yellow card) 6× (suspension)	Le Phare, Chambéry; Attendance: 2,315; Referees: Mitrovic, Vesovic (MNE)

13 October 2026; 19:45	CSM București (Romania)	24–25	(Bosnia and Herzegovina) RK Izviđač	Dinamo Polyvalent Hall, Bucharest; Attendance: 1,500; Referees: Biro, Kiss (HUN)
13 October 2026; 19:45	Drăgan, Baba 6	(9–12)	Melić 6	Dinamo Polyvalent Hall, Bucharest; Attendance: 1,500; Referees: Biro, Kiss (HUN)
13 October 2026; 19:45	5× (suspension)	Report	6× (suspension) 1× (red card)	Dinamo Polyvalent Hall, Bucharest; Attendance: 1,500; Referees: Biro, Kiss (HUN)

17 November 2026; 18:45	RK Izviđač (Bosnia and Herzegovina)	29–34	(Switzerland) Kadetten Schaffhausen	Sportska Dvorana Ljubuški, Ljubuški; Attendance: 4,000; Referees: Jerlecki, Labun (POL)
17 November 2026; 18:45	Šahinović 6	(12–16)	Ríkharðsson 10	Sportska Dvorana Ljubuški, Ljubuški; Attendance: 4,000; Referees: Jerlecki, Labun (POL)
17 November 2026; 18:45	3× (suspension)	Report	3× (suspension)	Sportska Dvorana Ljubuški, Ljubuški; Attendance: 4,000; Referees: Jerlecki, Labun (POL)

17 November 2026; 20:45	Chambéry SMB HB (France)	32–35	(Romania) CSM București	Le Phare, Chambéry; Attendance: 2,868; Referees: Borge, Nygren (NOR)
17 November 2026; 20:45	Vanègue 10	(12–18)	Drăgan 5	Le Phare, Chambéry; Attendance: 2,868; Referees: Borge, Nygren (NOR)
17 November 2026; 20:45	3× (suspension)	Report	1× (yellow card) 3× (suspension)	Le Phare, Chambéry; Attendance: 2,868; Referees: Borge, Nygren (NOR)

24 November 2026; 18:45	Kadetten Schaffhausen (Switzerland)	–	(France) Chambéry SMB HB	BBC Arena, Schaffhausen
24 November 2026; 18:45		(–)		BBC Arena, Schaffhausen
24 November 2026; 18:45		Report		BBC Arena, Schaffhausen

24 November 2026; 20:45	RK Izviđač (Bosnia and Herzegovina)	–	(Romania) CSM București	Sportska Dvorana Ljubuški, Ljubuški
24 November 2026; 20:45		(–)		Sportska Dvorana Ljubuški, Ljubuški
24 November 2026; 20:45		Report		Sportska Dvorana Ljubuški, Ljubuški

1 December 2026; 18:45	Chambéry SMB HB (France)	–	(Bosnia and Herzegovina) RK Izviđač	Le Phare, Chambéry
1 December 2026; 18:45		(–)		Le Phare, Chambéry
1 December 2026; 18:45		Report		Le Phare, Chambéry

1 December 2026; 19:45	CSM București (Romania)	–	(Switzerland) Kadetten Schaffhausen	Dinamo Polyvalent Hall, Bucharest
1 December 2026; 19:45		(–)		Dinamo Polyvalent Hall, Bucharest
1 December 2026; 19:45		Report		Dinamo Polyvalent Hall, Bucharest

=== Group D ===
Pos	Team	Pld	W	D	L	GF	GA	GD	Pts	Qualification	IKS	BER	SEV	TAT
1	(Sweden) IK Sävehof	4	3	0	1	127	107	+20	6	Play-offs	—	–	34–27	30–26
2	(Germany) Bergischer HC	4	2	1	1	122	123	−1	5	Play-offs	29–25	—	32–32	–
3	(Croatia) MRK Sesvete	4	1	2	1	132	133	−1	4		–	37–31	—	36–36
4	(Slovakia) Tatran Prešov	4	0	1	3	116	134	−18	1		25–38	29–30	–	—

Updated to match(es) played on 17 November 2026. Source: EHF
Rules for classification: Tiebreakers

29 September 2026; 18:45	IK Sävehof (Sweden)	34–27	(Croatia) MRK Sesvete	Partille Arena, Partille; Attendance: 625; Referees: Bogdanovs, Cernavskis (LAT)
29 September 2026; 18:45	Durlanu, Sandberg 7	(15–13)	Ivanišević 7	Partille Arena, Partille; Attendance: 625; Referees: Bogdanovs, Cernavskis (LAT)
29 September 2026; 18:45	6× (suspension)	Report	3× (suspension)	Partille Arena, Partille; Attendance: 625; Referees: Bogdanovs, Cernavskis (LAT)

30 September 2026; 20:45	Tatran Prešov (Slovakia)	29–30	(Germany) Bergischer HC	Tatran Handball Arena, Prešov; Attendance: 1,156; Referees: Lesiak, Lidacka (POL)
30 September 2026; 20:45	Bogdanić 10	(16–17)	Steinhaus 9	Tatran Handball Arena, Prešov; Attendance: 1,156; Referees: Lesiak, Lidacka (POL)
30 September 2026; 20:45	3× (suspension)	Report	5× (suspension)	Tatran Handball Arena, Prešov; Attendance: 1,156; Referees: Lesiak, Lidacka (POL)

6 October 2026; 18:45	Bergischer HC (Germany)	29–25	(Sweden) IK Sävehof	Klingenhalle, Solingen; Attendance: 2,359; Referees: Borge, Nygren (NOR)
6 October 2026; 18:45	Hangstein 8	(16–11)	Røisland 7	Klingenhalle, Solingen; Attendance: 2,359; Referees: Borge, Nygren (NOR)
6 October 2026; 18:45	5× (suspension)	Report	4× (suspension)	Klingenhalle, Solingen; Attendance: 2,359; Referees: Borge, Nygren (NOR)

6 October 2026; 20:45	MRK Sesvete (Croatia)	36–36	(Slovakia) Tatran Prešov	Srednja škola Jelkovec, Sesvete; Attendance: 1,550; Referees: Altmar, Horvath (HUN)
6 October 2026; 20:45	Tomic 7	(19–18)	Bogdanić 8	Srednja škola Jelkovec, Sesvete; Attendance: 1,550; Referees: Altmar, Horvath (HUN)
6 October 2026; 20:45	1× (yellow card) 3× (suspension)	Report	5× (suspension)	Srednja škola Jelkovec, Sesvete; Attendance: 1,550; Referees: Altmar, Horvath (HUN)

13 October 2026; 20:45	Tatran Prešov (Slovakia)	25–38	(Sweden) IK Sävehof	Tatran Handball Arena, Prešov; Attendance: 980; Referees: Serdiuc, Sîrbu (MDA)
13 October 2026; 20:45	Bogdanić 6	(11–20)	three players 5	Tatran Handball Arena, Prešov; Attendance: 980; Referees: Serdiuc, Sîrbu (MDA)
13 October 2026; 20:45	5× (suspension)	Report	3× (suspension)	Tatran Handball Arena, Prešov; Attendance: 980; Referees: Serdiuc, Sîrbu (MDA)

13 October 2026; 20:45	MRK Sesvete (Croatia)	37–31	(Germany) Bergischer HC	Srednja škola Jelkovec, Sesvete; Attendance: 1,750; Referees: Peretz, Schwartz (ISR)
13 October 2026; 20:45	Hršak 11	(18–13)	Hangstein, Fuchs 7	Srednja škola Jelkovec, Sesvete; Attendance: 1,750; Referees: Peretz, Schwartz (ISR)
13 October 2026; 20:45	1× (yellow card) 2× (suspension)	Report	1× (suspension)	Srednja škola Jelkovec, Sesvete; Attendance: 1,750; Referees: Peretz, Schwartz (ISR)

17 November 2026; 20:45	Bergischer HC (Germany)	32–32	(Croatia) MRK Sesvete	Klingenhalle, Solingen; Attendance: 2,321; Referees: Alvarez, Bustamante (ESP)
17 November 2026; 20:45	Steinhaus 7	(15–17)	Dumenčić 6	Klingenhalle, Solingen; Attendance: 2,321; Referees: Alvarez, Bustamante (ESP)
17 November 2026; 20:45	1× (yellow card) 2× (suspension)	Report	2× (yellow card) 4× (suspension) 1× (red card)	Klingenhalle, Solingen; Attendance: 2,321; Referees: Alvarez, Bustamante (ESP)

17 November 2026; 20:45	IK Sävehof (Sweden)	30–26	(Slovakia) Tatran Prešov	Partille Arena, Partille; Attendance: 307; Referees: Petursson, Thrastarson (ISL)
17 November 2026; 20:45	Durlanu 10	(16–13)	Urban 6	Partille Arena, Partille; Attendance: 307; Referees: Petursson, Thrastarson (ISL)
17 November 2026; 20:45	4× (suspension)	Report	2× (suspension)	Partille Arena, Partille; Attendance: 307; Referees: Petursson, Thrastarson (ISL)

24 November 2026; 18:45	IK Sävehof (Sweden)	–	(Germany) Bergischer HC	Partille Arena, Partille
24 November 2026; 18:45		(–)		Partille Arena, Partille
24 November 2026; 18:45		Report		Partille Arena, Partille

24 November 2026; 18:45	Tatran Prešov (Slovakia)	–	(Croatia) MRK Sesvete	Tatran Handball Arena, Prešov
24 November 2026; 18:45		(–)		Tatran Handball Arena, Prešov
24 November 2026; 18:45		Report		Tatran Handball Arena, Prešov

1 December 2026; 20:45	MRK Sesvete (Croatia)	–	(Sweden) IK Sävehof	Srednja škola Jelkovec, Sesvete
1 December 2026; 20:45		(–)		Srednja škola Jelkovec, Sesvete
1 December 2026; 20:45		Report		Srednja škola Jelkovec, Sesvete

1 December 2026; 20:45	Bergischer HC (Germany)	–	(Slovakia) Tatran Prešov	Klingenhalle, Solingen
1 December 2026; 20:45		(–)		Klingenhalle, Solingen
1 December 2026; 20:45		Report		Klingenhalle, Solingen

=== Group E ===
Pos	Team	Pld	W	D	L	GF	GA	GD	Pts	Qualification	FLE	GRA	BUZ	AGU
1	(Germany) SG Flensburg-Handewitt (Q)	4	4	0	0	145	111	+34	8	Play-offs	—	40–31	36–27	–
2	(Spain) Fraikin BM Granollers (Q)	4	3	0	1	130	127	+3	6	Play-offs	–	—	37–31	30–25
3	(Romania) HC Buzău	4	0	1	3	119	136	−17	1		31–33	–	—	30–30
4	(Portugal) Águas Santas	4	0	1	3	108	128	−20	1		22–36	31–32	–	—

Updated to match(es) played on 17 November 2026. Source: EHF
Rules for classification: Tiebreakers
(Q) Qualified for the phase indicated

29 September 2026; 19:45	HC Buzău (Romania)	30–30	(Portugal) Águas Santas	Romeo Iamandi, Buzău; Attendance: 1,500; Referees: Peretz, Schwartz (ISR)
29 September 2026; 19:45	Tărîță 9	(13–14)	Fontes 5	Romeo Iamandi, Buzău; Attendance: 1,500; Referees: Peretz, Schwartz (ISR)
29 September 2026; 19:45	2× (suspension)	Report	1× (yellow card) 2× (suspension)	Romeo Iamandi, Buzău; Attendance: 1,500; Referees: Peretz, Schwartz (ISR)

30 September 2026; 18:45	SG Flensburg-Handewitt (Germany)	40–31	(Spain) Fraikin BM Granollers	GGW Arena, Flensburg; Attendance: 3,044; Referees: Fotakidis, Kinatzidis (GRE)
30 September 2026; 18:45	Volz 8	(20–20)	Fis, Urdangarin 9	GGW Arena, Flensburg; Attendance: 3,044; Referees: Fotakidis, Kinatzidis (GRE)
30 September 2026; 18:45	1× (suspension)	Report		GGW Arena, Flensburg; Attendance: 3,044; Referees: Fotakidis, Kinatzidis (GRE)

6 October 2026; 19:45	Águas Santas (Portugal)	22–36	(Germany) SG Flensburg-Handewitt	Pavilhão da Associação Atlética de Águas Santas, Águas Santas; Attendance: 1,400; Referees: Jovandić, Sekulić (SER)
6 October 2026; 19:45	Lopes Sousa 5	(10–18)	Minne 6	Pavilhão da Associação Atlética de Águas Santas, Águas Santas; Attendance: 1,400; Referees: Jovandić, Sekulić (SER)
6 October 2026; 19:45	1× (yellow card)	Report	1× (suspension)	Pavilhão da Associação Atlética de Águas Santas, Águas Santas; Attendance: 1,400; Referees: Jovandić, Sekulić (SER)

6 October 2026; 20:45	Fraikin BM Granollers (Spain)	37–31	(Romania) HC Buzău	Palau d'Esports de Granollers, Granollers; Referees: Þrastarson, Pétursson (ISL)
6 October 2026; 20:45	Guijarro 6	(20–11)	Lazurca 8	Palau d'Esports de Granollers, Granollers; Referees: Þrastarson, Pétursson (ISL)
6 October 2026; 20:45	1× (yellow card) 5× (suspension)	Report	1× (yellow card) 2× (suspension)	Palau d'Esports de Granollers, Granollers; Referees: Þrastarson, Pétursson (ISL)

13 October 2026; 19:45	Águas Santas (Portugal)	31–32	(Spain) Fraikin BM Granollers	Pavilhão da Associação Atlética de Águas Santas, Águas Santas; Attendance: 700; Referees: Lončar, Lončar (CRO)
13 October 2026; 19:45	Queirós 9	(16–15)	Figueras 8	Pavilhão da Associação Atlética de Águas Santas, Águas Santas; Attendance: 700; Referees: Lončar, Lončar (CRO)
13 October 2026; 19:45	5× (suspension)	Report	5× (suspension)	Pavilhão da Associação Atlética de Águas Santas, Águas Santas; Attendance: 700; Referees: Lončar, Lončar (CRO)

13 October 2026; 20:45	SG Flensburg-Handewitt (Germany)	36–27	(Romania) HC Buzău	GGW Arena, Flensburg; Attendance: 3,477; Referees: Beňuš, Uhlíř (CZE)
13 October 2026; 20:45	Tønnesen, Volz 7	(17–14)	Virbauskas 11	GGW Arena, Flensburg; Attendance: 3,477; Referees: Beňuš, Uhlíř (CZE)
13 October 2026; 20:45	4× (suspension)	Report	2× (suspension)	GGW Arena, Flensburg; Attendance: 3,477; Referees: Beňuš, Uhlíř (CZE)

17 November 2026; 19:45	HC Buzău (Romania)	31–33	(Germany) SG Flensburg-Handewitt	Romeo Iamandi, Buzău; Attendance: 1,700; Referees: L. Hardegger, S. Hardegger (SUI)
17 November 2026; 19:45	Broască 8	(15–14)	Minne 9	Romeo Iamandi, Buzău; Attendance: 1,700; Referees: L. Hardegger, S. Hardegger (SUI)
17 November 2026; 19:45	2× (suspension)	Report	2× (suspension)	Romeo Iamandi, Buzău; Attendance: 1,700; Referees: L. Hardegger, S. Hardegger (SUI)

17 November 2026; 20:45	Fraikin BM Granollers (Spain)	30–25	(Portugal) Águas Santas	Palau d'Esports de Granollers, Granollers; Attendance: 958; Referees: Pagh, Pontoppidan (DEN)
17 November 2026; 20:45	Deumal 8	(14–9)	Baptista 8	Palau d'Esports de Granollers, Granollers; Attendance: 958; Referees: Pagh, Pontoppidan (DEN)
17 November 2026; 20:45	1× (yellow card) 2× (suspension)	Report	1× (yellow card)	Palau d'Esports de Granollers, Granollers; Attendance: 958; Referees: Pagh, Pontoppidan (DEN)

24 November 2026; 18:45	SG Flensburg-Handewitt (Germany)	–	(Portugal) Águas Santas	GGW Arena, Flensburg
24 November 2026; 18:45		(–)		GGW Arena, Flensburg
24 November 2026; 18:45		Report		GGW Arena, Flensburg

24 November 2026; 19:45	HC Buzău (Romania)	–	(Spain) Fraikin BM Granollers	Romeo Iamandi, Buzău
24 November 2026; 19:45		(–)		Romeo Iamandi, Buzău
24 November 2026; 19:45		Report		Romeo Iamandi, Buzău

1 December 2026; 19:45	Águas Santas (Portugal)	–	(Romania) HC Buzău	Pavilhão da Associação Atlética de Águas Santas, Águas Santas
1 December 2026; 19:45		(–)		Pavilhão da Associação Atlética de Águas Santas, Águas Santas
1 December 2026; 19:45		Report		Pavilhão da Associação Atlética de Águas Santas, Águas Santas

1 December 2026; 20:45	Fraikin BM Granollers (Spain)	–	(Germany) SG Flensburg-Handewitt	Palau d'Esports de Granollers, Granollers
1 December 2026; 20:45		(–)		Palau d'Esports de Granollers, Granollers
1 December 2026; 20:45		Report		Palau d'Esports de Granollers, Granollers

=== Group F ===
Pos	Team	Pld	W	D	L	GF	GA	GD	Pts	Qualification	TOR	BEN	HOL	KAR
1	(Spain) Bathco BM Torrelavega (Q)	4	4	0	0	133	113	+20	8	Play-offs	—	–	38–30	33–32
2	(Portugal) SL Benfica	4	2	0	2	120	112	+8	4	Play-offs	24–31	—	–	30–23
3	(Denmark) TTH Holstebro	4	2	0	2	122	123	−1	4		27–31	32–31	—	–
4	(Czech Republic) HCB Karviná (E)	4	0	0	4	104	131	−27	0		–	26–35	23–33	—

Updated to match(es) played on 17 November 2026. Source: EHF
Rules for classification: Tiebreakers
(E) Eliminated; (Q) Qualified for the phase indicated

29 September 2026; 18:45	HCB Karviná (Czech Republic)	23–33	(Denmark) TTH Holstebro	Sportovni hala házené STaRS, Karviná; Attendance: 1,200; Referees: Mitrović, Vešović (MNE)
29 September 2026; 18:45	Patzel 7	(11–16)	Berg 6	Sportovni hala házené STaRS, Karviná; Attendance: 1,200; Referees: Mitrović, Vešović (MNE)
29 September 2026; 18:45	4× (suspension)	Report	6× (suspension)	Sportovni hala házené STaRS, Karviná; Attendance: 1,200; Referees: Mitrović, Vešović (MNE)

29 September 2026; 20:45	SL Benfica (Portugal)	24–31	(Spain) Bathco BM Torrelavega	Pavilhão da Luz Nº 2, Lisbon; Attendance: 296; Referees: Picard, Vauchez (FRA)
29 September 2026; 20:45	Izquierdo 6	(14–17)	Prokop 6	Pavilhão da Luz Nº 2, Lisbon; Attendance: 296; Referees: Picard, Vauchez (FRA)
29 September 2026; 20:45	1× (yellow card) 1× (suspension)	Report	1× (suspension)	Pavilhão da Luz Nº 2, Lisbon; Attendance: 296; Referees: Picard, Vauchez (FRA)

6 October 2026; 20:45	TTH Holstebro (Denmark)	32–31	(Portugal) SL Benfica	Gråkjær Arena, Holstebro; Attendance: 2,036; Referees: Cipov, Klus (SVK)
6 October 2026; 20:45	three players 5	(15–15)	Bogojevic, Barbeito 7	Gråkjær Arena, Holstebro; Attendance: 2,036; Referees: Cipov, Klus (SVK)
6 October 2026; 20:45	1× (suspension)	Report	3× (suspension)	Gråkjær Arena, Holstebro; Attendance: 2,036; Referees: Cipov, Klus (SVK)

6 October 2026; 20:45	Bathco BM Torrelavega (Spain)	33–32	(Czech Republic) HCB Karviná	Pabellón Vicente Trueba, Torrelavega; Attendance: 1,463; Referees: Puksic, Satler (SLO)
6 October 2026; 20:45	Muñoz 7	(17–14)	Patzel 7	Pabellón Vicente Trueba, Torrelavega; Attendance: 1,463; Referees: Puksic, Satler (SLO)
6 October 2026; 20:45	2× (suspension)	Report	3× (suspension)	Pabellón Vicente Trueba, Torrelavega; Attendance: 1,463; Referees: Puksic, Satler (SLO)

13 October 2026; 18:45	HCB Karviná (Czech Republic)	26–35	(Portugal) SL Benfica	Sportovni hala házené STaRS, Karviná; Attendance: 1,500; Referees: Fabryczny, Rawicki (POL)
13 October 2026; 18:45	Valent 6	(14–18)	Nazaré 10	Sportovni hala házené STaRS, Karviná; Attendance: 1,500; Referees: Fabryczny, Rawicki (POL)
13 October 2026; 18:45	1× (yellow card) 1× (suspension)	Report	1× (yellow card) 3× (suspension)	Sportovni hala házené STaRS, Karviná; Attendance: 1,500; Referees: Fabryczny, Rawicki (POL)

13 October 2026; 20:45	Bathco BM Torrelavega (Spain)	38–30	(Denmark) TTH Holstebro	Pabellón Vicente Trueba, Torrelavega; Attendance: 1,422; Referees: Horváth, Marton (HUN)
13 October 2026; 20:45	Moyano 8	(16–16)	Pedersen, Reitan 8	Pabellón Vicente Trueba, Torrelavega; Attendance: 1,422; Referees: Horváth, Marton (HUN)
13 October 2026; 20:45	1× (yellow card) 3× (suspension)	Report	5× (suspension)	Pabellón Vicente Trueba, Torrelavega; Attendance: 1,422; Referees: Horváth, Marton (HUN)

17 November 2026; 18:45	TTH Holstebro (Denmark)	27–31	(Spain) Bathco BM Torrelavega	Gråkjær Arena, Holstebro; Attendance: 1,580; Referees: Mitrevski, Todorovski (MKD)
17 November 2026; 18:45	Berg 7	(12–15)	Muñoz 8	Gråkjær Arena, Holstebro; Attendance: 1,580; Referees: Mitrevski, Todorovski (MKD)
17 November 2026; 18:45	3× (suspension)	Report	2× (yellow card) 1× (suspension)	Gråkjær Arena, Holstebro; Attendance: 1,580; Referees: Mitrevski, Todorovski (MKD)

17 November 2026; 19:45	SL Benfica (Portugal)	30–23	(Czech Republic) HCB Karviná	Pavilhão da Luz Nᵒ 2, Lisbon; Attendance: 343; Referees: R. Thiyagarajah, S. Thiyagarajah (GER)
17 November 2026; 19:45	Bandeira 10	(14–12)	Patzel 4	Pavilhão da Luz Nᵒ 2, Lisbon; Attendance: 343; Referees: R. Thiyagarajah, S. Thiyagarajah (GER)
17 November 2026; 19:45	4× (suspension)	Report	3× (suspension)	Pavilhão da Luz Nᵒ 2, Lisbon; Attendance: 343; Referees: R. Thiyagarajah, S. Thiyagarajah (GER)

24 November 2026; 18:45	TTH Holstebro (Denmark)	–	(Czech Republic) HCB Karviná	Gråkjær Arena, Holstebro
24 November 2026; 18:45		(–)		Gråkjær Arena, Holstebro
24 November 2026; 18:45		Report		Gråkjær Arena, Holstebro

24 November 2026; 20:45	Bathco BM Torrelavega (Spain)	–	(Portugal) SL Benfica	Pabellón Vicente Trueba, Torrelavega
24 November 2026; 20:45		(–)		Pabellón Vicente Trueba, Torrelavega
24 November 2026; 20:45		Report		Pabellón Vicente Trueba, Torrelavega

1 December 2026; 19:45	SL Benfica (Portugal)	–	(Denmark) TTH Holstebro	Pavilhão da Luz Nᵒ 2, Lisbon
1 December 2026; 19:45		(–)		Pavilhão da Luz Nᵒ 2, Lisbon
1 December 2026; 19:45		Report		Pavilhão da Luz Nᵒ 2, Lisbon

1 December 2026; 20:45	HCB Karviná (Czech Republic)	–	(Spain) Bathco BM Torrelavega	Sportovni hala házené STaRS, Karviná
1 December 2026; 20:45		(–)		Sportovni hala házené STaRS, Karviná
1 December 2026; 20:45		Report		Sportovni hala házené STaRS, Karviná

=== Group G ===
Pos	Team	Pld	W	D	L	GF	GA	GD	Pts	Qualification	GDA	GUM	LOG	PEL
1	(Poland) PGE Wybrzeże Gdańsk	4	2	2	0	134	129	+5	6	Play-offs	—	–	30–30	31–31
2	(Germany) VfL Gummersbach	4	2	0	2	134	125	+9	4	Play-offs	34–38	—	–	38–28
3	(Spain) BM Logroño La Rioja	4	1	1	2	125	123	+2	3		34–35	30–34	—	–
4	(North Macedonia) HC Eurofarm Pelister	4	1	1	2	112	128	−16	3		–	29–28	24–31	—

Updated to match(es) played on 17 November 2026. Source: EHF
Rules for classification: Tiebreakers

29 September 2026; 18:45	VfL Gummersbach (Germany)	34–38	(Poland) PGE Wybrzeże Gdańsk	Schwalbe-Arena, Gummersbach; Attendance: 3,011; Referees: Hardegger, Hardegger (SUI)
29 September 2026; 18:45	Roganović 9	(19–17)	Czapliński 8	Schwalbe-Arena, Gummersbach; Attendance: 3,011; Referees: Hardegger, Hardegger (SUI)
29 September 2026; 18:45	2× (suspension) 1× (red card)	Report	4× (suspension)	Schwalbe-Arena, Gummersbach; Attendance: 3,011; Referees: Hardegger, Hardegger (SUI)

30 September 2026; 20:45	HC Eurofarm Pelister (North Macedonia)	24–31	(Spain) BM Logroño La Rioja	Boro Čurlevski Sports Hall, Bitola; Attendance: 3,000; Referees: Borge, Nygren (NOR)
30 September 2026; 20:45	Ristevski, Atanasijevic 4	(8–16)	Martínez 7	Boro Čurlevski Sports Hall, Bitola; Attendance: 3,000; Referees: Borge, Nygren (NOR)
30 September 2026; 20:45	2× (suspension) 1× (red card)	Report	5× (suspension) 1× (red card)	Boro Čurlevski Sports Hall, Bitola; Attendance: 3,000; Referees: Borge, Nygren (NOR)

6 October 2026; 18:45	PGE Wybrzeże Gdańsk (Poland)	31–31	(North Macedonia) HC Eurofarm Pelister	Ergo Arena, Gdańsk; Attendance: 4,213; Referees: Chiruta, Murariu (ROU)
6 October 2026; 18:45	Tomczak 8	(16–17)	Kuzmanovski 15	Ergo Arena, Gdańsk; Attendance: 4,213; Referees: Chiruta, Murariu (ROU)
6 October 2026; 18:45	2× (suspension)	Report	2× (yellow card) 5× (suspension)	Ergo Arena, Gdańsk; Attendance: 4,213; Referees: Chiruta, Murariu (ROU)

6 October 2026; 20:45	BM Logroño La Rioja (Spain)	30–34	(Germany) VfL Gummersbach	Palacio de los Deportes de La Rioja, Logroño; Attendance: 1,182; Referees: Ivanovic, Kaludjerovic (MNE)
6 October 2026; 20:45	D'Antino 6	(16–17)	Kodrin, Roganović 7	Palacio de los Deportes de La Rioja, Logroño; Attendance: 1,182; Referees: Ivanovic, Kaludjerovic (MNE)
6 October 2026; 20:45	2× (yellow card) 4× (suspension)	Report	3× (suspension) 2× (red card)	Palacio de los Deportes de La Rioja, Logroño; Attendance: 1,182; Referees: Ivanovic, Kaludjerovic (MNE)

13 October 2026; 18:45	VfL Gummersbach (Germany)	38–28	(North Macedonia) HC Eurofarm Pelister	Schwalbe-Arena, Gummersbach; Attendance: 3,177; Referees: Pagh, Pontoppidan (DEN)
13 October 2026; 18:45	Dujshebaev 9	(20–15)	Kuzmanovski 7	Schwalbe-Arena, Gummersbach; Attendance: 3,177; Referees: Pagh, Pontoppidan (DEN)
13 October 2026; 18:45	1× (yellow card) 1× (suspension)	Report	3× (suspension)	Schwalbe-Arena, Gummersbach; Attendance: 3,177; Referees: Pagh, Pontoppidan (DEN)

13 October 2026; 18:45	PGE Wybrzeże Gdańsk (Poland)	30–30	(Spain) BM Logroño La Rioja	Ergo Arena, Gdańsk; Attendance: 4,228; Referees: Novykov (UKR), Gatelis (LTU)
13 October 2026; 18:45	Mořkovský 9	(13–14)	Oliveira 9	Ergo Arena, Gdańsk; Attendance: 4,228; Referees: Novykov (UKR), Gatelis (LTU)
13 October 2026; 18:45	1× (yellow card) 2× (suspension)	Report	1× (yellow card) 3× (suspension)	Ergo Arena, Gdańsk; Attendance: 4,228; Referees: Novykov (UKR), Gatelis (LTU)

17 November 2026; 20:45	HC Eurofarm Pelister (North Macedonia)	29–28	(Germany) VfL Gummersbach	Boro Čurlevski Sports Hall, Bitola; Attendance: 2,750; Referees: Benus, Uhlir (CZE)
17 November 2026; 20:45	Kuzmanovski 7	(9–14)	Vujović 8	Boro Čurlevski Sports Hall, Bitola; Attendance: 2,750; Referees: Benus, Uhlir (CZE)
17 November 2026; 20:45	3× (suspension) 1× (red card)	Report	4× (suspension) 1× (red card)	Boro Čurlevski Sports Hall, Bitola; Attendance: 2,750; Referees: Benus, Uhlir (CZE)

17 November 2026; 20:45	BM Logroño La Rioja (Spain)	34–35	(Poland) PGE Wybrzeże Gdańsk	Palacio de los Deportes de La Rioja, Logroño; Attendance: 2,234; Referees: Horváth, Marton (HUN)
17 November 2026; 20:45	three players 5	(17–15)	Czapliński 12	Palacio de los Deportes de La Rioja, Logroño; Attendance: 2,234; Referees: Horváth, Marton (HUN)
17 November 2026; 20:45	5× (suspension)	Report	1× (yellow card) 4× (suspension) 2× (red card)	Palacio de los Deportes de La Rioja, Logroño; Attendance: 2,234; Referees: Horváth, Marton (HUN)

24 November 2026; 18:45	HC Eurofarm Pelister (North Macedonia)	–	(Poland) PGE Wybrzeże Gdańsk	Boro Čurlevski Sports Hall, Bitola
24 November 2026; 18:45		(–)		Boro Čurlevski Sports Hall, Bitola
24 November 2026; 18:45		Report		Boro Čurlevski Sports Hall, Bitola

24 November 2026; 20:45	VfL Gummersbach (Germany)	–	(Spain) BM Logroño La Rioja	Schwalbe-Arena, Gummersbach
24 November 2026; 20:45		(–)		Schwalbe-Arena, Gummersbach
24 November 2026; 20:45		Report		Schwalbe-Arena, Gummersbach

1 December 2026; 18:45	PGE Wybrzeże Gdańsk (Poland)	–	(Germany) VfL Gummersbach	Ergo Arena, Gdańsk
1 December 2026; 18:45		(–)		Ergo Arena, Gdańsk
1 December 2026; 18:45		Report		Ergo Arena, Gdańsk

1 December 2026; 18:45	BM Logroño La Rioja (Spain)	–	(North Macedonia) HC Eurofarm Pelister	Palacio de los Deportes de La Rioja, Logroño
1 December 2026; 18:45		(–)		Palacio de los Deportes de La Rioja, Logroño
1 December 2026; 18:45		Report		Palacio de los Deportes de La Rioja, Logroño

=== Group H ===
Pos	Team	Pld	W	D	L	GF	GA	GD	Pts	Qualification	SLO	VAL	TKC	MOR
1	(Slovenia) RD LL Grosist Slovan (Q)	4	4	0	0	143	116	+27	8	Play-offs	—	34–29	–	37–26
2	(Iceland) Valur	4	2	0	2	134	125	+9	4	Play-offs	–	—	38–34	39–28
3	(Hungary) MOL Tatabánya KC	4	1	0	3	127	137	−10	2		31–36	29–28	—	–
4	(Denmark) Mors-Thy Håndbold	4	1	0	3	119	145	−26	2		30–36	–	35–33	—

Updated to match(es) played on 17 November 2026. Source: EHF
Rules for classification: Tiebreakers
(Q) Qualified for the phase indicated

29 September 2026; 20:45	Valur (Iceland)	39–28	(Denmark) Mors-Thy Håndbold	Hlíðarendi, Reykjavík; Attendance: 532; Referees: Novykov (UKR), Gatelis (LTU)
29 September 2026; 20:45	Óskarsson 10	(19–15)	Wosniak, Jensen 6	Hlíðarendi, Reykjavík; Attendance: 532; Referees: Novykov (UKR), Gatelis (LTU)
29 September 2026; 20:45	4× (suspension)	Report	4× (suspension)	Hlíðarendi, Reykjavík; Attendance: 532; Referees: Novykov (UKR), Gatelis (LTU)

30 September 2026; 18:45	MOL Tatabánya KC (Hungary)	31–36	(Slovenia) RD LL Grosist Slovan	Tatabányai Multifunkcionális Sportcsarnok, Tatabánya; Attendance: 1,740; Referees: Jørum, Kleven (NOR)
30 September 2026; 18:45	Éles 5	(16–18)	Cokan 16	Tatabányai Multifunkcionális Sportcsarnok, Tatabánya; Attendance: 1,740; Referees: Jørum, Kleven (NOR)
30 September 2026; 18:45	6× (suspension)	Report	3× (suspension)	Tatabányai Multifunkcionális Sportcsarnok, Tatabánya; Attendance: 1,740; Referees: Jørum, Kleven (NOR)

6 October 2026; 18:45	RD LL Grosist Slovan (Slovenia)	34–29	(Iceland) Valur	Tivoli Hall, Ljubljana; Attendance: 377; Referees: Bozhinovski, Nachevski (MKD)
6 October 2026; 18:45	Latkovic 6	(20–12)	Róbertsson 8	Tivoli Hall, Ljubljana; Attendance: 377; Referees: Bozhinovski, Nachevski (MKD)
6 October 2026; 18:45	4× (suspension)	Report	1× (suspension)	Tivoli Hall, Ljubljana; Attendance: 377; Referees: Bozhinovski, Nachevski (MKD)

6 October 2026; 18:45	Mors-Thy Håndbold (Denmark)	35–33	(Hungary) MOL Tatabánya KC	Thy Hallen, Thisted; Attendance: 712; Referees: Alvarez, Bustamante (ESP)
6 October 2026; 18:45	Houe 7	(20–16)	Grigoraș 10	Thy Hallen, Thisted; Attendance: 712; Referees: Alvarez, Bustamante (ESP)
6 October 2026; 18:45	1× (yellow card) 2× (suspension)	Report	1× (yellow card) 5× (suspension) 1× (red card)	Thy Hallen, Thisted; Attendance: 712; Referees: Alvarez, Bustamante (ESP)

13 October 2026; 18:45	Mors-Thy Håndbold (Denmark)	30–36	(Slovenia) RD LL Grosist Slovan	Thy Hallen, Thisted; Attendance: 700; Referees: Jerlecki, Labun (POL)
13 October 2026; 18:45	Houe 7	(14–17)	Samoila, Čavor 6	Thy Hallen, Thisted; Attendance: 700; Referees: Jerlecki, Labun (POL)
13 October 2026; 18:45	1× (yellow card) 4× (suspension)	Report	1× (yellow card) 5× (suspension)	Thy Hallen, Thisted; Attendance: 700; Referees: Jerlecki, Labun (POL)

13 October 2026; 20:45	Valur (Iceland)	38–34	(Hungary) MOL Tatabánya KC	Hlíðarendi, Reykjavík; Attendance: 536; Referees: Kull, Tint (EST)
13 October 2026; 20:45	Óskarsson, Róbertsson 9	(16–16)	Éles 6	Hlíðarendi, Reykjavík; Attendance: 536; Referees: Kull, Tint (EST)
13 October 2026; 20:45	3× (suspension)	Report	2× (yellow card) 5× (suspension) 1× (red card)	Hlíðarendi, Reykjavík; Attendance: 536; Referees: Kull, Tint (EST)

17 November 2026	MOL Tatabánya KC (Hungary)	29–28	(Iceland) Valur	Tatabányai Multifunkcionális Sportcsarnok, Tatabánya; Attendance: 2,000; Referees: D. Loncar, Z. Loncar (CRO)
17 November 2026	Sztraka, Molnár 5	(14–12)	Óskarsson 8	Tatabányai Multifunkcionális Sportcsarnok, Tatabánya; Attendance: 2,000; Referees: D. Loncar, Z. Loncar (CRO)
17 November 2026	3× (suspension)	Report	2× (suspension)	Tatabányai Multifunkcionális Sportcsarnok, Tatabánya; Attendance: 2,000; Referees: D. Loncar, Z. Loncar (CRO)

17 November 2026	RD LL Grosist Slovan (Slovenia)	37–26	(Denmark) Mors-Thy Håndbold	Tivoli Hall, Ljubljana; Attendance: 328; Referees: Ivanovic, Kaludjerovic (MNE)
17 November 2026	Mlivić 7	(17–13)	Kvistgaard Bak 8	Tivoli Hall, Ljubljana; Attendance: 328; Referees: Ivanovic, Kaludjerovic (MNE)
17 November 2026	1× (yellow card) 2× (suspension)	Report	2× (yellow card) 4× (suspension)	Tivoli Hall, Ljubljana; Attendance: 328; Referees: Ivanovic, Kaludjerovic (MNE)

24 November 2026; 18:45	RD LL Grosist Slovan (Slovenia)	–	(Hungary) MOL Tatabánya KC	Tivoli Hall, Ljubljana
24 November 2026; 18:45		(–)		Tivoli Hall, Ljubljana
24 November 2026; 18:45		Report		Tivoli Hall, Ljubljana

24 November 2026; 20:45	Mors-Thy Håndbold (Denmark)	–	(Iceland) Valur	Thy Hallen, Thisted
24 November 2026; 20:45		(–)		Thy Hallen, Thisted
24 November 2026; 20:45		Report		Thy Hallen, Thisted

1 December 2026	MOL Tatabánya KC (Hungary)	–	(Denmark) Mors-Thy Håndbold	Tatabányai Multifunkcionális Sportcsarnok, Tatabánya
1 December 2026		(–)		Tatabányai Multifunkcionális Sportcsarnok, Tatabánya
1 December 2026		Report		Tatabányai Multifunkcionális Sportcsarnok, Tatabánya

1 December 2026	Valur (Iceland)	–	(Slovenia) RD LL Grosist Slovan	Hlíðarendi, Reykjavík
1 December 2026		(–)		Hlíðarendi, Reykjavík
1 December 2026		Report		Hlíðarendi, Reykjavík
