= 2025–26 Liga ASOBAL =

36th season of the Liga ASOBAL

Liga ASOBAL
- Season: 2025–26
- Dates: 12 September 2025 – 31 May 2026
- Champions: FC Barcelona
- Relegated: Bada Huesca; Sanicentro BM Guadalajara
- Champions League: FC Barcelona
- European League: BM Logroño La Rioja; Fraikin BM Granollers; Irudek Bidasoa Irún; Bathco BM Torrelavega
- Matches: 240
- Goals: 14,625 (60.94 per match)
- Top goalscorer: Gonzalo Pérez (231 goals)

The 2025–26 Liga ASOBAL was the 36th season of the Liga ASOBAL, Spain's premier handball league. The season began on 12 September 2025 and concluded on 31 May 2026.

On 12 April 2026, defending champions FC Barcelona officially secured their 33rd title.

== Teams ==
2025–26 Liga Asobal teams

=== Team changes ===
Promoted from 2024–25 División de Plata de Balonmano	Relegated from 2024–25 Liga ASOBAL
Horneo Eón Alicante; BM Caserío Ciudad Real	Helvetia Anaitasuna; TM Benidorm

=== Stadiums ===
Team	City	Venue	Capacity
Abanca Ademar León	León	Pabellón Municipal de los Deportes	6,000
Ángel Ximénez Puente Genil	Puente Genil	Pabellón Municipal Alcalde Miguel Salas	900
Bada Huesca	Huesca	Palacio Municipal de Huesca	4,900
Bathco BM Torrelavega	Torrelavega	Pabellón Municipal Vicente Trueba	2,400
BM Caserío Ciudad Real	Ciudad Real	Quijote Arena	5,500
BM Logroño La Rioja	Logroño	Palacio de los Deportes de La Rioja	3,809
FC Barcelona	Barcelona	Palau Blaugrana	7,234
Fraikin BM Granollers	Granollers	Palau d'Esports de Granollers	6,000
Frigoríficos del Morrazo	Cangas do Morrazo	Pabellón Municipal de O Gatañal	2,500
Horneo Eón Alicante	Alicante	Pabellón Pitiu Rochel	1,780
Irudek Bidasoa Irún	Irún	Polideportivo Artaleku	2,500
Rebi Balonmano Cuenca	Cuenca	Pabellón Municipal El Sargal	1,800
Recoletas Atlético Valladolid	Valladolid	Polideportivo Huerta del Rey	3,550
Sanicentro BM Guadalajara	Guadalajara	Pabellón David Santamaría	1,500
Tubos Aranda Villa de Aranda	Aranda de Duero	Pabellón Santiago Manguán	2,800
Viveros Herol BM Nava	Nava de la Asunción	Pabellón Municipal Guerrer@s Naver@s	900

== League table ==
Pos	Team	Pld	W	D	L	GF	GA	GD	Pts	Qualification or relegation
1	FC Barcelona (C)	30	30	0	0	1204	799	+405	60	Qualification for the Champions League group stage
2	BM Logroño La Rioja	30	20	3	7	950	892	+58	43	Qualification for the European League group stage
3	Fraikin BM Granollers	30	21	1	8	952	897	+55	43	Qualification for the European League group stage
4	Irudek Bidasoa Irún	30	20	2	8	960	902	+58	42	Qualification for the European League group stage
5	Bathco BM Torrelavega	30	19	3	8	949	889	+60	41	Qualification for the European League group stage
6	Recoletas Atlético Valladolid	30	15	3	12	871	882	−11	33	
7	Abanca Ademar León	30	12	7	11	918	928	−10	31	
8	BM Caserío Ciudad Real	30	12	3	15	874	929	−55	27	
9	Horneo Eón Alicante	30	12	2	16	912	944	−32	26	
10	Tubos Aranda Villa de Aranda	30	11	1	18	866	909	−43	23	
11	Rebi Balonmano Cuenca	30	10	3	17	851	921	−70	23	
12	Frigoríficos del Morrazo	30	10	2	18	838	895	−57	22	
13	Ángel Ximénez Puente Genil	30	8	3	19	842	916	−74	19	
14	Viveros Herol BM Nava	30	9	1	20	881	948	−67	19	Relegation playoffs
15	Bada Huesca (R)	30	7	3	20	880	981	−101	17	Relegation to División de Plata
16	Sanicentro BM Guadalajara (R)	30	4	3	23	877	993	−116	11	Relegation to División de Plata

Source: ASOBAL
Rules for classification: 1) points; 2) head-to-head points; 3) head-to-head goal difference; 4) head-to-head number of goals scored; 5) goal difference; 6) goals scored.
(C) Champions; (R) Relegated

== Results ==
Home \ Away	ADE	PGE	HCA	TLV	CAS	LOG	BAR	GRA	CNG	EON	BID	CQN	GUA	ATV	VDA	NAV
Abanca Ademar León	—	29–28	33–33	28–28	38–31	32–32	28–38	36–39	25–19	29–28	28–30	29–28	34–31	27–28	37–32	32–29
Ángel Ximénez Puente Genil	26–33	—	37–36	26–25	27–27	39–42	23–38	23–28	28–34	25–25	30–36	22–21	33–29	25–30	28–27	26–28
Bada Huesca	35–30	27–31	—	32–31	29–29	25–31	29–40	33–41	30–31	30–32	25–31	30–25	29–24	30–30	28–25	25–24
Bathco BM Torrelavega	40–33	32–27	33–28	—	35–28	29–25	27–35	33–35	28–30	29–28	32–31	32–29	39–31	24–24	28–25	28–25
BM Caserío Ciudad Real	27–33	27–31	37–31	29–37	—	28–33	27–37	26–24	28–28	33–23	33–30	25–23	34–27	33–30	22–19	30–27
BM Logroño La Rioja	33–33	31–24	33–28	30–29	38–35	—	28–41	33–29	33–26	33–29	32–34	32–31	34–30	32–28	42–30	28–25
FC Barcelona	48–31	41–29	42–25	36–24	43–26	43–30	—	42–31	42–31	51–32	33–31	42–22	40–20	35–25	41–27	45–25
Fraikin BM Granollers	30–29	38–33	36–29	32–31	38–29	24–24	28–35	—	33–25	29–31	32–29	31–30	19–15	27–23	28–22	37–33
Frigoríficos del Morrazo	25–29	32–30	32–27	28–30	34–25	26–30	22–35	27–33	—	28–25	25–26	28–24	29–34	29–30	28–26	26–28
Horneo Eón Alicante	35–32	39–35	34–27	32–38	26–31	31–29	23–37	31–28	34–24	—	32–33	28–28	32–28	25–27	33–31	38–35
Irudek Bidasoa Irún	26–26	32–27	32–24	34–34	32–25	28–32	27–39	31–32	30–27	38–35	—	32–30	34–31	34–24	32–26	26–27
Rebi Balonmano Cuenca	30–24	29–27	35–33	27–28	31–30	29–28	23–52	28–32	31–31	32–27	30–36	—	33–33	31–23	24–22	33–32
Sanicentro BM Guadalajara	26–26	25–25	36–30	30–44	28–30	32–36	24–38	29–32	30–32	29–35	36–38	33–34	—	31–25	27–30	26–33
Recoletas Atlético Valladolid	30–30	25–23	35–25	27–29	34–30	27–34	28–39	29–26	29–23	31–30	33–36	33–25	32–22	—	36–30	36–35
Tubos Aranda Villa de Aranda	35–33	26–24	30–34	31–34	32–26	26–35	28–34	33–27	28–25	30–26	32–36	33–23	36–32	33–29	—	29–25
Viveros Herol BM Nava	28–31	24–30	41–33	33–38	31–33	21–17	24–42	27–35	34–33	34–32	30–35	33–32	29–30	29–30	32–32	—

Source: ASOBAL
Legend: Blue = home team win; Yellow = draw; Red = away team win.

== Top goalscorers ==
Rank	Player	Club	Goals
1	(Spain) Gonzalo Pérez	Abanca Ademar León	231
2	(Spain) David Cadarso	BM Logroño La Rioja	165
3	(Spain) Marcos Fis	Fraikin BM Granollers	164
4	(Spain) Álvaro Martínez	BM Logroño La Rioja	137
5	(Portugal) Joao Lourenço	Viveros Herol BM Nava	135
6	(Spain) Isidoro Martínez	Bathco BM Torrelavega	130
7	(Spain) Ander Torrico	Horneo Eón Alicante	129
7	(Slovakia) Jakub Prokop	Bathco BM Torrelavega	129
9	(Spain) Javier Muñoz	Bathco BM Torrelavega	128
10	(Hungary) Rajmund Tóth	Rebi Balonmano Cuenca	127
