= Mile Mijušković =

Montenegrin handball player (born 1985)

Personal information
- Nationality: Montenegrin
- Born: 8 October 1985 (age 41) Nikšić, SR Montenegro, Yugoslavia
- Height: 1.92 m (6 ft 4 in)

Sport
- Sport: Handball
- Position: Goalkeeper
- Current club: BM Torrelavega
- Number: 85
National team
Years	Team	Apps	(Gls)
–	Montenegro	44	(0)

Mile Mijušković (born 8 October 1985) is a Montenegrin handball player for BM Torrelavega and the Montenegrin national team.
