= 2026–27 EHF European League =

European club handball tournament

EHF European League
- 2026–27
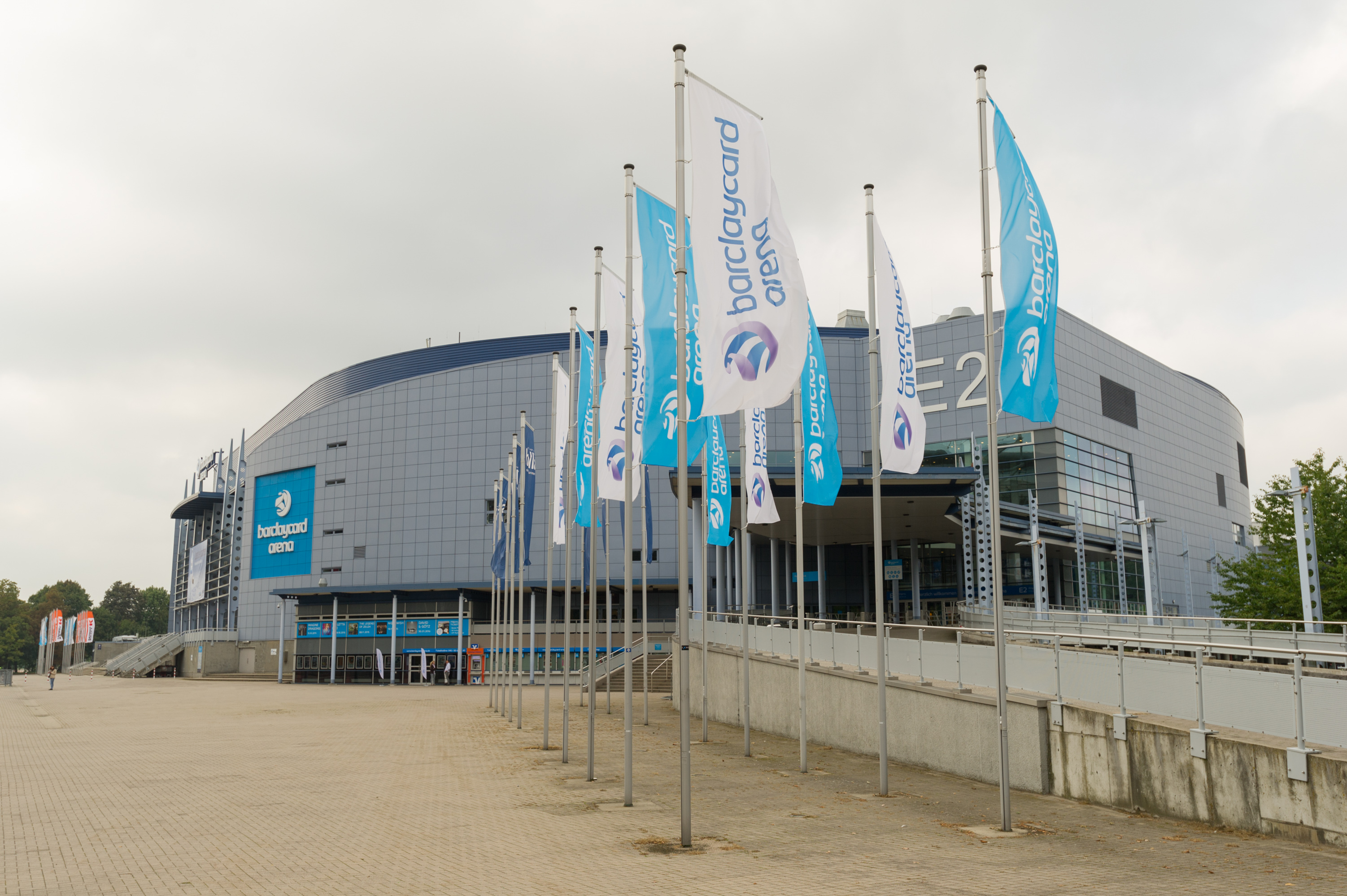
- The Final Four will be played at the Barclays Arena in Hamburg, Germany

Tournament information
- Sport: Handball
- Date: Group stage: 29 September – 2 December 2026; Knockout stage: 9 February – 28 April 2027; Final Four: 22–23 May 2027
- Tournament format(s): Round Robin and Knockout stage
- Website: EHF European League

The 2026–27 EHF European League is the 46th season of Europe's secondary club handball tournament organised by the European Handball Federation (EHF), and the 7th season since it was renamed from the EHF Cup to the EHF European League.

== Format ==
The tournament has a new format as follows:

- Group stage: 32 teams are split into eight groups of four with home and away matches. The top 2 teams in each group will progress to the play-offs. Teams from the same country can't be drawn into the same group.
- Play-offs: The 16 group winners and runners-up are joined by the 12 teams that finished third and fourth in the group phase of the EHF Champions League, and play in 14 different home and away matches. The winners advance to the last 16.
- Last 16: The 14 winners from the play-offs are joined by two more teams that finished fifth in the Champions League main round and play in eight home and away ties. The winners progress to the quarterfinals.
- Quarter-finals: The winners of the Last 16 will play a knockout system to determine who makes it to the European League finals, played in a Final 4 format.

== Rankings ==
The rankings are based on the performances of each club from a respective country from a three-year period.

- Associations 1–2 can have four clubs qualify.
- Associations 3–5 can have three clubs qualify.
- Associations 6–11 can have two clubs qualify.
- Associations 12–18 can have one club qualify.
- Associations below the top 18 are allowed to enter apply one club for a potential wildcard.

Rank	Association	Average points	Teams
1	Germany	154.67	3
2	France	97.00	3
3	Portugal	67.00	3
4	Spain	66.00	4
5	Denmark	61.33	2
6	Switzerland	53.00	1
7	Sweden	47.00	2
8	Croatia	42.67	2
9	Romania	38.33	2
10	Iceland	29.50	2
11	Hungary	28.33	1
12	Ukraine	22.50	0
13	Serbia	19.00	0

Rank	Association	Average points	Teams
14	North Macedonia	19.00	1
15	Poland	18.33	1
16	Slovakia	16.33	1
17	Slovenia	13.33	1
18	Montenegro	10.00	0
19	Norway	9.67	1
20	Austria	9.00	0
21	Bosnia and Herzegovina	6.50	1
22	Greece	6.00	0
23	Czech Republic	5.50	1
24	Finland	3.00	0
N/A	(N/A) Everyone else	0.00	0

=== Ranking facts ===
Biggest rise
Pos	Team	Old	New	Move
1	Serbia	21	13	▲ +8
2	Iceland	14	10	▲ +4
2	Ukraine	16	12	▲ +4
2	Montenegro	22	18	▲ +4
2	Austria	16	14	▲ +4
2	Czech Republic	27	23	▲ +4

Biggest fall
Pos	Team	Old	New	Move
1	Russia	15	25	▼ –10
2	Poland	9	15	▼ –6
2	Slovenia	11	17	▼ –6
2	Finland	18	24	▼ –6
5	Croatia	4	8	▼ –4

New entries
Czech Republic

Entries leaving
Russia

== Qualified teams ==
The full list of teams qualified for each stage of the 2026–27 EHF European League was announced on 17 July 2026.

The labels in the parentheses show how each team qualified for the place of its starting round:

- CW: Cup winners
- CR: Cup runners-up
- 1st, ..., 5th: League position of the previous season

Group stage
(Germany) SG Flensburg-Handewitt (3rd)	(Germany) VfL Gummersbach (4th)	(Germany) Bergischer HC (13th, CR)	(France) Limoges Handball (4th)
(France) Chambéry SMB HB (5th)	(France) Saint-Raphaël Var Handball (6th)	(Portugal) SL Benfica (3rd, CR)	(Portugal) Águas Santas (4th)
(Portugal) Madeira Andebol SAD (5th)	(Spain) BM Logroño La Rioja (2nd)	(Spain) Fraikin BM Granollers (3rd)	(Spain) Irudek Bidasoa Irún (4th, CR)
(Spain) Bathco BM Torrelavega (5th)	(Denmark) TTH Holstebro (4th) (Note: To decide Denmark's representatives, the regular season standings are used.)	(Denmark) Mors-Thy Håndbold (6th)	(Switzerland) Kadetten Schaffhausen (2nd, CW)
(Sweden) Hammarby IF (3rd) (Note: To decide Sweden's representatives, the regular season standings are used.)	(Sweden) IK Sävehof (6th)	(Croatia) MRK Sesvete (2nd)	(Croatia) RK Nexe (3rd, CR)
(Romania) HC Buzău (2nd)	(Romania) CSM București (3rd)	(Iceland) Valur (1st)	(Iceland) FH Hafnarfjordur (2nd)
(Hungary) MOL Tatabánya KC (3rd, CR)	(North Macedonia) HC Eurofarm Pelister (2nd)	(Poland) PGE Wybrzeże Gdańsk (3rd, CR)	(Slovakia) Tatran Prešov (1st, CW)
(Slovenia) RD LL Grosist Slovan (2nd)	(Norway) Elverum Håndball (3rd)	(Bosnia and Herzegovina) HC Izviđač (1st)	(Czech Republic) HCB Karviná (1st)

== Round and draw dates ==
=== Schedule ===
Phase	Round	Draw date	Round date
Group stage	Matchday 1	17 July 2026	29 September 2026
Group stage	Matchday 2	17 July 2026	6 October 2026
Group stage	Matchday 3	17 July 2026	13 October 2026
Group stage	Matchday 4	17 July 2026	17 November 2026
Group stage	Matchday 5	17 July 2026	24 November 2026
Group stage	Matchday 6	17 July 2026	1 December 2026
Play offs	First leg	TBD	9 February 2027
Play offs	Second leg	TBD	23 February 2027
Last 16	First leg	TBD	23 March 2027
Last 16	Second leg	TBD	30 March 2027
Quarterfinals	First leg	TBD	20 April 2027
Quarterfinals	Second leg	TBD	27 April 2027
Final four	Semi-finals	TBD	22 May 2027
Final four	Final and Third place game	TBD	23 May 2027

== Group stage ==
Location of teams of the 2025–26 EHF European League group stage
Brown: Group A; Red: Group B; Orange: Group C; Yellow: Group D;
Green: Group E; Blue: Group F; Purple: Group G; Pink: Group H

The draw for the group stage was conducted on 17 July 2026 at the EHF office in Vienna.

In the group stage, teams were ranked according to points (2 points for a win, 1 point for a draw, 0 points for a loss). After completion of the group stage, if two or more teams have scored the same number of points, the ranking will be determined as follows:

Tiebreakers
1. Highest number of points in matches between the teams directly involved;
2. Superior goal difference in matches between the teams directly involved;
3. Highest number of goals scored in matches between the teams directly involved;
4. Superior goal difference in all matches of the group;
5. Highest number of plus goals in all matches of the group;
6. Drawing of Lots

=== Group A ===
Pos	Team	Pld	W	D	L	GF	GA	GD	Pts	Qualification	NEX	HAM	ELV	SRA
1	(Croatia) RK Nexe	4	3	0	1	138	125	+13	6	Play-offs	—	–	38–23	33–26
2	(Sweden) Hammarby IF	4	3	0	1	126	124	+2	6	Play-offs	30–28	—	–	34–26
3	(Norway) Elverum Håndball	4	2	0	2	142	137	+5	4		37–39	37–28	—	–
4	(France) Saint-Raphaël Var Handball	4	0	0	4	117	137	−20	0		–	33–34	32–36	—

Updated to match(es) played on 17 November 2026. Source: EHF
Rules for classification: Tiebreakers

=== Group B ===
Pos	Team	Pld	W	D	L	GF	GA	GD	Pts	Qualification	MAD	LIM	BID	FHH
1	(Portugal) Madeira Andebol SAD	4	3	0	1	146	128	+18	6	Play-offs	—	–	40–32	37–29
2	(France) Limoges Handball	4	3	0	1	142	126	+16	6	Play-offs	31–30	—	32–28	–
3	(Spain) Irudek Bidasoa Irún	4	2	0	2	134	142	−8	4		–	35–33	—	39–37
4	(Iceland) FH Hafnarfjordur	4	0	0	4	135	161	−26	0		36–39	33–46	–	—

Updated to match(es) played on 17 November 2026. Source: EHF
Rules for classification: Tiebreakers

=== Group C ===
Pos	Team	Pld	W	D	L	GF	GA	GD	Pts	Qualification	KAD	RKI	CHA	BUC
1	(Switzerland) Kadetten Schaffhausen	4	4	0	0	150	119	+31	8	Play-offs	—	42–30	–	39–32
2	(Bosnia and Herzegovina) RK Izviđač	4	2	0	2	118	133	−15	4	Play-offs	29–34	—	34–33	–
3	(France) Chambéry SMB HB	4	1	0	3	126	129	−3	2		28–35	–	—	32–35
4	(Romania) CSM București	4	1	0	3	116	129	−13	2		–	24–25	25–33	—

Updated to match(es) played on 17 November 2026. Source: EHF
Rules for classification: Tiebreakers

=== Group D ===
Pos	Team	Pld	W	D	L	GF	GA	GD	Pts	Qualification	IKS	BER	SEV	TAT
1	(Sweden) IK Sävehof	4	3	0	1	127	107	+20	6	Play-offs	—	–	34–27	30–26
2	(Germany) Bergischer HC	4	2	1	1	122	123	−1	5	Play-offs	29–25	—	32–32	–
3	(Croatia) MRK Sesvete	4	1	2	1	132	133	−1	4		–	37–31	—	36–36
4	(Slovakia) Tatran Prešov	4	0	1	3	116	134	−18	1		25–38	29–30	–	—

Updated to match(es) played on 17 November 2026. Source: EHF
Rules for classification: Tiebreakers

=== Group E ===
Pos	Team	Pld	W	D	L	GF	GA	GD	Pts	Qualification	FLE	GRA	BUZ	AGU
1	(Germany) SG Flensburg-Handewitt	4	4	0	0	145	111	+34	8	Play-offs	—	40–31	36–27	–
2	(Spain) Fraikin BM Granollers	4	3	0	1	130	127	+3	6	Play-offs	–	—	37–31	30–25
3	(Romania) HC Buzău	4	0	1	3	119	136	−17	1		31–33	–	—	30–30
4	(Portugal) Águas Santas	4	0	1	3	108	128	−20	1		22–36	31–32	–	—

Updated to match(es) played on 17 November 2026. Source: EHF
Rules for classification: Tiebreakers

=== Group F ===
Pos	Team	Pld	W	D	L	GF	GA	GD	Pts	Qualification	TOR	BEN	HOL	KAR
1	(Spain) Bathco BM Torrelavega	4	4	0	0	133	113	+20	8	Play-offs	—	–	38–30	33–32
2	(Portugal) SL Benfica	4	2	0	2	120	112	+8	4	Play-offs	24–31	—	–	30–23
3	(Denmark) TTH Holstebro	4	2	0	2	122	123	−1	4		27–31	32–31	—	–
4	(Czech Republic) HCB Karviná	4	0	0	4	104	131	−27	0		–	26–35	23–33	—

Updated to match(es) played on 17 November 2026. Source: EHF
Rules for classification: Tiebreakers

=== Group G ===
Pos	Team	Pld	W	D	L	GF	GA	GD	Pts	Qualification	GDA	GUM	LOG	PEL
1	(Poland) PGE Wybrzeże Gdańsk	4	2	2	0	134	129	+5	6	Play-offs	—	–	30–30	31–31
2	(Germany) VfL Gummersbach	4	2	0	2	134	125	+9	4	Play-offs	34–38	—	–	38–28
3	(Spain) BM Logroño La Rioja	4	1	1	2	125	123	+2	3		34–35	30–34	—	–
4	(North Macedonia) HC Eurofarm Pelister	4	1	1	2	112	128	−16	3		–	29–28	24–31	—

Updated to match(es) played on 17 November 2026. Source: EHF
Rules for classification: Tiebreakers

=== Group H ===
Pos	Team	Pld	W	D	L	GF	GA	GD	Pts	Qualification	SLO	VAL	TKC	MOR
1	(Slovenia) RD LL Grosist Slovan	4	4	0	0	143	116	+27	8	Play-offs	—	34–29	–	37–26
2	(Iceland) Valur	4	2	0	2	134	125	+9	4	Play-offs	–	—	38–34	39–28
3	(Hungary) MOL Tatabánya KC	4	1	0	3	127	137	−10	2		31–36	29–28	—	–
4	(Denmark) Mors-Thy Håndbold	4	1	0	3	119	145	−26	2		30–36	–	35–33	—

Updated to match(es) played on 17 November 2026. Source: EHF
Rules for classification: Tiebreakers

== Knockout stage ==
In the play-offs, sixteen teams ranked 1st and 2nd from the group stage, along with the twelve teams that finished third and fourth in the Champions League group stage, play against each other in home-and-away matches.

The fourteen winning teams will then be joined by the two teams that finished fifth in the Champions League main round for another round of home-and-away matches to advance to the quarterfinals. The quarterfinal winners qualify for the Final Four tournament.

== Final Four ==
The Final Four tournament will be held at the Barclays Arena in Hamburg, Germany.

=== Bracket ===
Semi-finals
22 May
22 May

Final
23 May
Third place
23 May

== Top goalscorers ==
As of 17 November 2026

Rank	Player	Team	Goals
1	(Iceland) Óðinn Þór Ríkharðsson	(Switzerland) Kadetten Schaffhausen	43
2	(Cape Verde) Délcio Pina	(Portugal) Madeira Andebol SAD	35
3	(Norway) Kevin Gulliksen	(Norway) Elverum Håndball	34
3	(Croatia) Tin Lučin	(Croatia) RK Nexe	34
5	(Denmark) Frederik Emil Pedersen	(Norway) Elverum Håndball	32
5	(Iceland) Gunnar Róbertsson	(Iceland) Valur	32
7	(France) Lucas Vanègue	(France) Chambéry SMB HB	30
8	(Romania) Andrei Drăgan	(Romania) CSM București	29
8	(North Macedonia) Filip Kuzmanovski	(North Macedonia) HC Eurofarm Pelister	29
8	(Iceland) Arnór Snær Óskarsson	(Iceland) Valur	29

== See also ==
- 2026–27 EHF Champions League
- 2026–27 EHF European Cup
- 2026–27 Women's EHF Champions League
- 2026–27 Women's EHF European League
