= Oswaldo Guimarães =

Brazilian handball player (born 1989)

Oswaldo Maestro
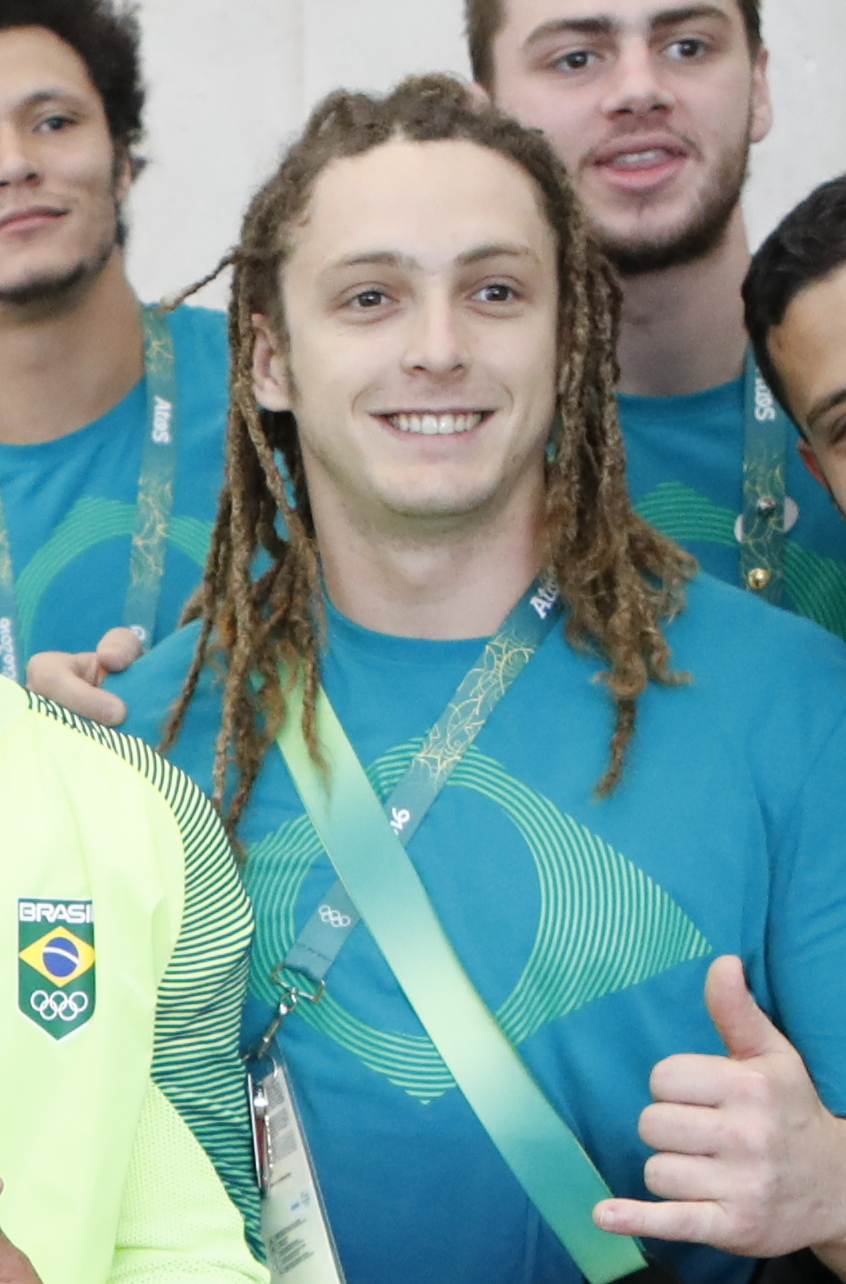
- Maestro in 2016

Personal information
- Full name: Oswaldo Maestro dos Santos Guimarães
- Born: 23 October 1989 (age 36) São Paulo, Brazil
- Height: 1.83 m (6 ft 0 in)

Sport
- Sport: Handball
- Position: Right Back
- Current club: Balonmano Torrelavega
- Number: 16

Senior clubs
- Years: Team
- –2013: EC Pinheiros
- 2013–2016: BM Villa de Aranda
- 2016–2018: SCDR Anaitasuna
- 2018–2021: BM Granollers
- 2021–2023: BHB Billére Pau Pyrénées
- 2023–: Balonmano Torrelavega
National team
Years	Team	Apps	(Gls)
–	Brazil	49	(74)
Medal record
Men's handball
Representing Brazil
Pan American Games
Gold medal – first place	2015 Toronto	Team
Bronze medal – third place	2019 Lima	Team
Pan American Championship
Gold medal – first place	2016 Argentina
Silver medal – second place	2018 Greenland
South and Central American Championship
Silver medal – second place	2020 Brazil
South American Games
Gold medal – first place	2018 Cochabamba	Team

Oswaldo Maestro dos Santos Guimarães (born 23 October 1989) is a Brazilian handball player for Balonmano Torrelavega and the Brazilian handball team.

He won a gold medal the 2015 Pan American Games and competed for Brazil at the 2013 World Championships and 2016 Summer Olympics.
