= Leonardo Terçariol =

Brazilian handball player (born 1987)

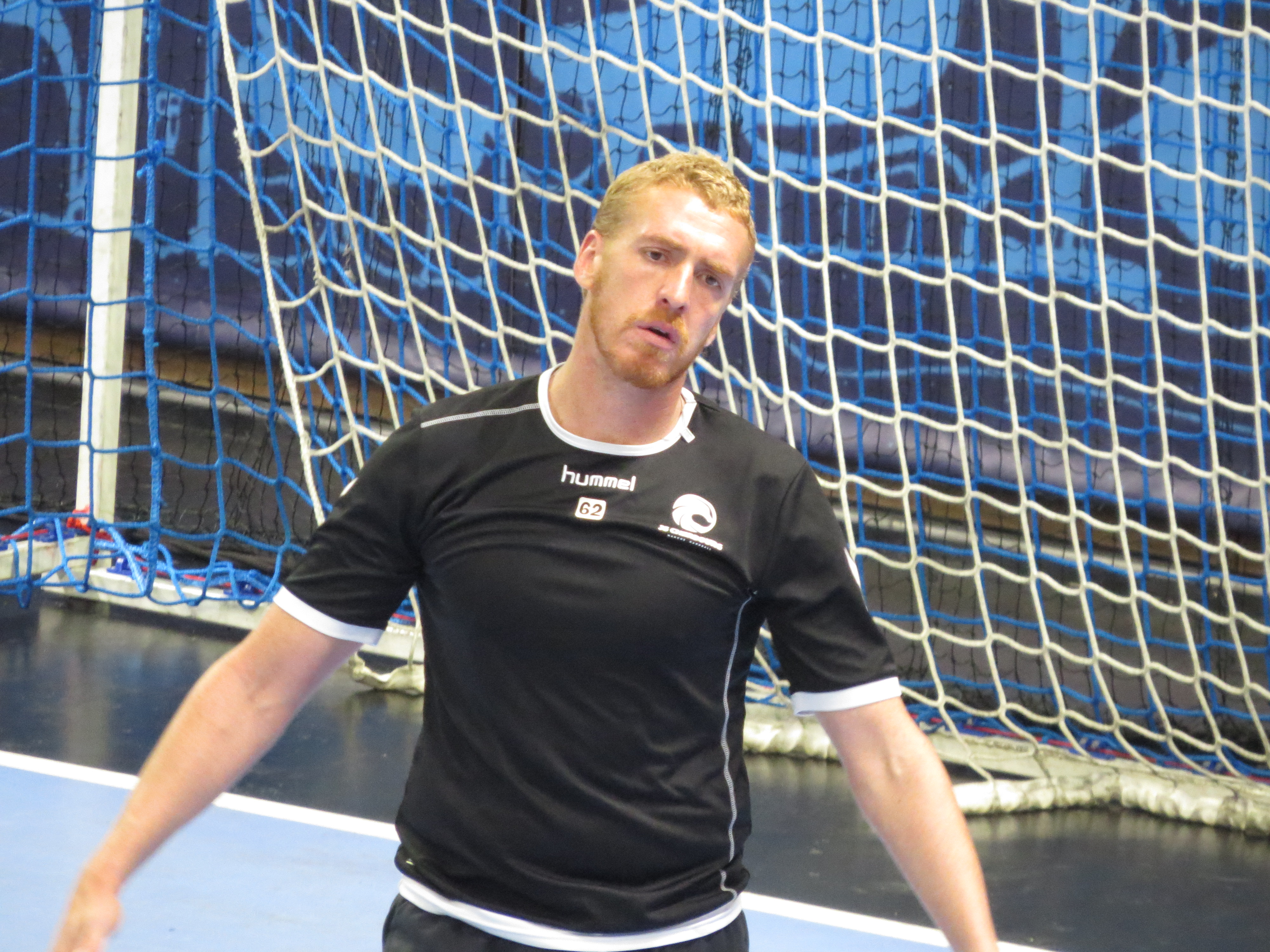
- Terçariol in 2017

Personal information
- Born: 14 April 1987 (age 39) São Bernardo do Campo, Brazil
- Height: 1.94 m (6 ft 4 in)

Sport
- Sport: Handball
- Position: Goalkeeper
- Current club: BM Torrelavega
- Number: 62

Senior clubs
- Years: Team
- 2005-2014: ADC Metodista
- 2014-2015: Follo HK
- 2015-2017: BM Ciudad Encantada
- 2017-2018: Cherbourg HB
- 2018-2021: CB Benidorm
- 2021-2022: BM Ciudad de Logroño
- 2022-2024: CB Huesca
- 2024-: BM Torrelavega
National team
Years	Team	Apps	(Gls)
–	Brazil	43	(4)
Medal record
Pan American Games
Silver medal – second place	2023 Santiago	Team
Bronze medal – third place	2019 Lima	Team
South and Central American Championship
Silver medal – second place	2020 Brazil

Leonardo Vial Terçariol (born 14 April 1987) is a Brazilian handball player for BM Benidorm and the Brazilian national team.

He represented Brazil at the 2019 World Men's Handball Championship. He also competed at the 2020 Summer Olympics.

== Individual awards ==
- 2020 South and Central American Men's Handball Championship: Best goalkeeper
