= Balonmano Torrelavega =

Spanish handball club

- Full name: Bathco Balonmano Torrelavega
- Nickname(s): Naranjas, El Escuadrón Naranja, The Orange Squad
- Founded: 2002; 24 years ago
- Arena: Pabellón Municipal Vicente Trueba, Torrelavega
- Capacity: 2,500
- President: Antonio Gómez Peña
- Head coach: Jacobo Cuétara
- League: Liga ASOBAL
- 2024–25: 3rd
- Club colours
Home	Away

Balonmano Torrelavega is a team of handball based in Torrelavega, Spain. It plays in Liga ASOBAL.

The current name of the club is Bathco Balonmano Torrelavega due to sponsorship reasons.

Location of Balonmano Torrelavega

== History ==
The club was founded in 2002. The predecessor clubs were AD EDM Torrelavega and BMT Cuatrocaños. Since the 2021/2022 season, the team has been playing in the highest Spanish league, Liga ASOBAL. In 2024, the team reached the final of the Copa del Rey, where the best Spanish team won the silver medal against FC Barcelona.

== Crest, colours, supporters ==
=== Kits ===
HOME
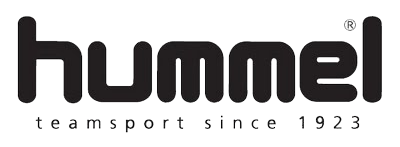
2011-12

== Team ==
=== Current squad ===
Squad for the 2024–25 season

Balonmano Torrelavega

Goalkeepers

- 12 (Spain) Carlos Calle
- 62 (Brazil) Leonardo Terçariol
- 71 (Spain) Abraham González

Left Wingers

- 6 (Spain) Miguel de Cos Gutierrez
- 10 (Spain) Alex Rubiño
- 32 (Spain) Ángel Fernández Pérez

Right Wingers

- 3 (Spain) Antonio Torres Quiñonero
- 14 (Spain) Javier Muñoz
- 25 (Argentina) Facundo Cangiani

Line Players

- 4 (Brazil) Márcio da Silva
- 19 (Spain) Borja Lombilla
- 24 (Spain) Jokin Aja
- 88 (Spain) Diego Gandara

Central Backs

- 21 (Spain) Isidoro Martínez
- 26 (Slovakia) Marko Jurkovic
- 30 (Spain) Pedro Berrío
- 77 (Spain) Nicolai Colunga

Left Backs

- 11 (Spain) Carlos Gómez Alonso
- 15 (Spain) Juanjo Fernández
- 18 (Slovakia) Jakub Prokop

Right Backs

- 28 (Brazil) Oswaldo Maestro dos Santos

=== Technical staff ===
- Head coach: (Spain) Jacobo Cuétara
- Assistant coach: (Spain) Jordi Lluelles Miserol
- Goalkeeping coach: (Spain) Marcos Gárate
- Physiotherapist: (Spain) Álvaro Leiva
- Club doctor: (Spain) Pedro Vicente Del Moral

=== Transfers ===
Transfers for the 2026–27 season

Joining

- (Brazil) Rangel da Rosa (GK) from (Portugal) S.L. Benfica
- (Brazil) Mikael Lopes Cândido (RB) from (Spain) FC Barcelona
- (Iran) Saeid Barkhordari (GK) from (Spain) CB Ademar León
- (Cuba) Frank Cordiés (LB) from (Spain) BM Huesca
- (Spain) Pedro Berrío (CB) back from loan at (Spain) CB Soria

Leaving

- (Brazil) Leonardo Terçariol (GK) to (Spain) BM Proin Triana
- (France) James Edward Scott Junior (LB) to (France) Dijon Métropole Handball
- (Spain) Carlos Gómez Alonso (LB) on loan at (Spain) BM Cisne

=== Transfer History ===
Transfers for the 2025–26 season

Joining

- (Argentina) Andrés Moyano (RB) from (Spain) BM Granollers
- (France) James Edward Scott Junior (LB) from (Japan) Daido Steel HC

Leaving

- (Brazil) Guilherme Linhares (RB) to (Spain) BM Cisne
- (Spain) Pedro Berrío (CB) on loan at (Spain) CB Soria
- (Spain) Diego Gándara (LP) on loan at (Spain) BM Rebi Cuenca

Transfers for the 2024–25 season

Joining

- (Slovakia) Jakub Prokop (LB) from (Spain) CB Nava
- (Brazil) Leonardo Terçariol (GK) from (Spain) BM Huesca
- (Brazil) Márcio da Silva (LP) from (Spain) Ángel Ximénez Puente Genil
- (Brazil) Guilherme Linhares (RB) from (Spain) CB Burgos
- (Spain) Ángel Fernández Pérez (LW) from (France) Limoges Handball
- (Spain) Nicolai Colunga (CB) from (Denmark) TMS Ringsted
- (Spain) Juanjo Fernández (LB) from (Spain) REBI Balonmano Cuenca

Leaving

- (Poland) Mikołaj Czapliński (LW) to (Poland) Wybrzeże Gdańsk
- (Montenegro) Mile Mijušković (GK)
- (Argentina) Fabrizio Casanova Barrera (LB) to (Spain) CB Burgos
- (Brazil) Matheus Novais (CB) to (Spain) BM Puerto Sagunto
- (Spain) Adrián Fernández (CB) to (Spain) Abanca Ademar León
- (Spain) Alonso Moreno Guirao (RB) to (Spain) Helvetia Anaitasuna
- (Spain) Daniel Ramos Crespo (LP) to (Spain) Ángel Ximénez Puente Genil
- (Spain) Héctor González Díaz (LB) to (Switzerland) CS Chênois Genève
- (Spain) Pablo Paredes (LB)

== Accomplishments ==
- División de Plata de Balonmano
  - Gold (1): 2021
- Copa del Rey
  - Silver (1): 2024

== EHF ranking ==
As of 10/22/2026

Rank	Team	Points
59	(Greece) AEK H.C.	77
60	(Italy) Raimond Sassari	77
61	(Slovenia) RK Trimo Trebnje	76
62	(Spain) Balonmano Torrelavega	74
63	(Greece) PAOK	72
64	(Romania) AHC Potaissa Turda	69
65	(Denmark) Mors-Thy Håndbold	72

== Former club members ==
=== Notable former players ===
==== Goalkeepers ====
- (Brazil) Leonardo Terçariol (2024–)
- (Cape Verde) Élcio Fernandes (2021–2023)
- (Montenegro) Mile Mijušković (2022–2024)

==== Right wingers ====
- (Argentina) Facundo Cangiani (2019–)

==== Left wingers ====
- (Spain) Ángel Fernández Pérez (2008–2013, 2024–)
- (Poland) Mikołaj Czapliński (2022–2024)
- (Ukraine) Zakhar Denysov (2022)

==== Line players ====
- (Spain) Jaime Gallego (2020–2023)
- (Serbia) Ivan Popović (2022–2023)

==== Left backs ====
- (Spain) Asier Nieto (2015–2016)
- (Spain) Pablo Paredes (2023–2024)
- (Argentina) Fabrizio Casanova Barrera (2019–2024)
- (Switzerland) Thomas Gautschi (2010–2011)
- (Slovakia) Jakub Prokop (2024–)
- (Uruguay) (Spain) Máximo Cancio (2016–2017)

==== Right backs ====
- (Brazil) Oswaldo Maestro dos Santos (2022–)

=== Former coaches ===
Seasons	Coach	Country
2019–2024	Álex Mozas	(Spain)
2024–	Jacobo Cuétara	(Spain)
