= 2013 Men's Youth World Handball Championship =

Tournament details
- Host country: Hungary
- Venues: 2 (in 2 host cities)
- Dates: August 10–23
- Teams: 24 (from 4 confederations)

Final positions
- Champions: Denmark (3rd title)
- Runners-up: Croatia
- Third place: Germany
- Fourth place: Spain

Tournament statistics
- Matches played: 100
- Goals scored: 5,758 (57.58 per match)
- Top scorers: (Brazil) José Toledo (Romania) Nicușor Negru (64 goals)

Awards
- Best player: (Denmark) Simon Hald Jensen

The 2013 IHF Men's Youth World Championship was the 5th edition of the tournament and was held at Hungary from 10 – 23 August 2013.

The Oceania Continent Handball Federation withdrew from the tournament.

Denmark defeated Croatia 32–26 in the final to win the title for the third consecutive time.

== Venues ==
Location	View	City	Arena	Capacity
2013 Men's Youth World Handball Championship is located in Hungary		Budaörs	BVUSS	1,000
2013 Men's Youth World Handball Championship is located in Hungary		Érd	Városi Sportcsarnok	1,800

== Qualified teams ==
Africa

- Angola
- Egypt
- Gabon
- Tunisia

Americas

- Argentina
- Brazil
- Chile
- Venezuela

Asia

- Japan
- South Korea
- Qatar

Europe

- Austria
- Belarus
- Croatia
- Denmark
- France (replaced team from Oceania)
- Germany
- Hungary (host)
- Norway
- Romania
- Serbia
- Slovenia
- Spain
- Sweden

Oceania

Oceania gave up their spot, a team from Europe (France) replaced its spot.

== Preliminary round ==
Twenty-four teams were drawn into four groups of six teams each. The draw was made in Budaörs on 23 May 2013. The top four teams from each group advanced to the Round of 16. The match schedule was released on June 13.

=== Group A ===
Team	Pld	W	D	L	GF	GA	GD	Pts
Denmark	5	5	0	0	177	119	+58	10
Egypt	5	3	0	2	181	151	+30	6
Serbia	5	3	0	2	161	142	+19	6
Belarus	5	3	0	2	142	138	+4	6
Japan	5	1	0	4	152	177	−25	2
Chile	5	0	0	5	105	191	−86	0

10 August 2013; 09:30	Denmark	39 – 27	Japan	BVUSS, Budaörs; Attendance: 300; Referees: Krichene, Makhlouf (TUN)
10 August 2013; 09:30	Pedersen 10	(17–14)	Tokuda 9	BVUSS, Budaörs; Attendance: 300; Referees: Krichene, Makhlouf (TUN)
10 August 2013; 09:30	3× (yellow card) 1× (suspension)	Report	3× (yellow card)	BVUSS, Budaörs; Attendance: 300; Referees: Krichene, Makhlouf (TUN)

10 August 2013; 11:45	Egypt	53 – 22	Chile	BVUSS, Budaörs; Attendance: 250; Referees: Guzmán, Pérez (PUR)
10 August 2013; 11:45	Saad 10	(24–10)	Adema 4	BVUSS, Budaörs; Attendance: 250; Referees: Guzmán, Pérez (PUR)
10 August 2013; 11:45	2× (yellow card) 1× (suspension)	Report	2× (yellow card) 1× (suspension)	BVUSS, Budaörs; Attendance: 250; Referees: Guzmán, Pérez (PUR)

10 August 2013; 14:00	Belarus	26 – 23	Serbia	BVUSS, Budaörs; Attendance: 100; Referees: Johansson, Kliko (SWE)
10 August 2013; 14:00	Harbuz 8	(12–9)	Vrgović, Radjenović 4	BVUSS, Budaörs; Attendance: 100; Referees: Johansson, Kliko (SWE)
10 August 2013; 14:00	4× (yellow card) 8× (suspension)	Report	3× (yellow card) 9× (suspension)	BVUSS, Budaörs; Attendance: 100; Referees: Johansson, Kliko (SWE)

11 August 2013; 16:00	Japan	36 – 38	Egypt	BVUSS, Budaörs; Attendance: 200; Referees: Andorka, Hucker (HUN)
11 August 2013; 16:00	Tanaka 10	(16–16)	Amr Badawy 10	BVUSS, Budaörs; Attendance: 200; Referees: Andorka, Hucker (HUN)
11 August 2013; 16:00	3× (yellow card) 4× (suspension)	Report	2× (yellow card) 4× (suspension)	BVUSS, Budaörs; Attendance: 200; Referees: Andorka, Hucker (HUN)

11 August 2013; 18:15	Serbia	32 – 38	Denmark	BVUSS, Budaörs; Attendance: 300; Referees: Fonseca, Santos (POR)
11 August 2013; 18:15	Sretenović 8	(15–23)	Kirkelokke 9	BVUSS, Budaörs; Attendance: 300; Referees: Fonseca, Santos (POR)
11 August 2013; 18:15	3× (yellow card) 3× (suspension)	Report	3× (yellow card) 3× (suspension)	BVUSS, Budaörs; Attendance: 300; Referees: Fonseca, Santos (POR)

11 August 2013; 20:30	Chile	23 – 27	Belarus	BVUSS, Budaörs; Referees: Bartlett, Stokes (GBR)
11 August 2013; 20:30	Franco 5	(12–17)	Harbuz 6	BVUSS, Budaörs; Referees: Bartlett, Stokes (GBR)
11 August 2013; 20:30	3× (yellow card) 6× (suspension)	Report	3× (yellow card) 5× (suspension)	BVUSS, Budaörs; Referees: Bartlett, Stokes (GBR)

13 August 2013; 09:30	Denmark	38 – 17	Chile	BVUSS, Budaörs; Attendance: 50; Referees: Assignon, Akpatsa (TOG)
13 August 2013; 09:30	Kildelund 7	(18–9)	Ayala 5	BVUSS, Budaörs; Attendance: 50; Referees: Assignon, Akpatsa (TOG)
13 August 2013; 09:30	3× (yellow card) 1× (suspension)	Report	3× (yellow card) 4× (suspension)	BVUSS, Budaörs; Attendance: 50; Referees: Assignon, Akpatsa (TOG)

13 August 2013; 11:45	Egypt	37 – 30	Belarus	BVUSS, Budaörs; Attendance: 280; Referees: Schulze, Tönnies (GER)
13 August 2013; 11:45	Hossam 8	(14–17)	Harbuz 9	BVUSS, Budaörs; Attendance: 280; Referees: Schulze, Tönnies (GER)
13 August 2013; 11:45	3× (yellow card) 4× (suspension)	Report	3× (yellow card) 7× (suspension)	BVUSS, Budaörs; Attendance: 280; Referees: Schulze, Tönnies (GER)

13 August 2013; 14:00	Japan	29 – 37	Serbia	BVUSS, Budaörs; Attendance: 250; Referees: Brunner, Salah (SUI)
13 August 2013; 14:00	Tanaka 9	(13–17)	Mladenović 12	BVUSS, Budaörs; Attendance: 250; Referees: Brunner, Salah (SUI)
13 August 2013; 14:00	3× (yellow card) 4× (suspension)	Report	3× (yellow card) 3× (suspension)	BVUSS, Budaörs; Attendance: 250; Referees: Brunner, Salah (SUI)

14 August 2013; 13:45	Belarus	20 – 32	Denmark	BVUSS, Budaörs; Attendance: 200; Referees: Kolahdouzan, Mousavian (IRN)
14 August 2013; 13:45	Karvatski, Gayduchenko 5	(9–15)	Stoklund Larsen 6	BVUSS, Budaörs; Attendance: 200; Referees: Kolahdouzan, Mousavian (IRN)
14 August 2013; 13:45	3× (yellow card) 1× (suspension)	Report	3× (yellow card) 7× (suspension)	BVUSS, Budaörs; Attendance: 200; Referees: Kolahdouzan, Mousavian (IRN)

14 August 2013; 16:00	Egypt	30 – 33	Serbia	BVUSS, Budaörs; Attendance: 900; Referees: Mata, López (ESP)
14 August 2013; 16:00	Amr Badawy 7	(15–17)	Mladenović 9	BVUSS, Budaörs; Attendance: 900; Referees: Mata, López (ESP)
14 August 2013; 16:00	3× (yellow card) 2× (suspension)	Report	3× (yellow card) 5× (suspension)	BVUSS, Budaörs; Attendance: 900; Referees: Mata, López (ESP)

14 August 2013; 20:30	Chile	24 – 37	Japan	BVUSS, Budaörs; Attendance: 200; Referees: Fonseca, Santos (POR)
14 August 2013; 20:30	Adema 7	(12–16)	Tanaka, Tokuda 6	BVUSS, Budaörs; Attendance: 200; Referees: Fonseca, Santos (POR)
14 August 2013; 20:30	3× (yellow card) 5× (suspension)	Report	3× (yellow card) 5× (suspension)	BVUSS, Budaörs; Attendance: 200; Referees: Fonseca, Santos (POR)

16 August 2013; 09:30	Serbia	36 – 19	Chile	BVUSS, Budaörs; Attendance: 50; Referees: Assignon, Akpatsa (TOG)
16 August 2013; 09:30	Mršulja 8	(16–10)	Adema 7	BVUSS, Budaörs; Attendance: 50; Referees: Assignon, Akpatsa (TOG)
16 August 2013; 09:30	3× (yellow card) 4× (suspension)	Report	3× (yellow card)	BVUSS, Budaörs; Attendance: 50; Referees: Assignon, Akpatsa (TOG)

16 August 2013; 11:45	Belarus	39 – 23	Japan	BVUSS, Budaörs; Attendance: 50; Referees: Andorka, Hucker (HUN)
16 August 2013; 11:45	Gayduchenko, Harbuz 9	(19–13)	Tokuda 6	BVUSS, Budaörs; Attendance: 50; Referees: Andorka, Hucker (HUN)
16 August 2013; 11:45	3× (yellow card) 3× (suspension)	Report	2× (yellow card) 1× (suspension)	BVUSS, Budaörs; Attendance: 50; Referees: Andorka, Hucker (HUN)

16 August 2013; 14:00	Denmark	30 – 23	Egypt	BVUSS, Budaörs; Attendance: 250; Referees: Schulze, Tönnies (GER)
16 August 2013; 14:00	Jacobsen 5	(15–10)	Amr Badawy, Mohamed Yehia 5	BVUSS, Budaörs; Attendance: 250; Referees: Schulze, Tönnies (GER)
16 August 2013; 14:00	3× (yellow card) 7× (suspension)	Report	2× (yellow card) 6× (suspension) 1× (red card)	BVUSS, Budaörs; Attendance: 250; Referees: Schulze, Tönnies (GER)

=== Group B ===
Team	Pld	W	D	L	GF	GA	GD	Pts
Sweden	5	5	0	0	169	121	+48	10
Qatar	5	3	0	2	122	140	−18	6
Slovenia	5	2	1	2	151	142	+9	5
Romania	5	2	1	2	150	147	+3	5
Tunisia	5	1	0	4	121	144	−23	2
South Korea	5	1	0	4	155	174	−19	2

10 August 2013; 16:15	Sweden	32 – 22	Tunisia	BVUSS, Budaörs; Referees: Andorka, Hucker (HUN)
10 August 2013; 16:15	Karlsson 6	(18–12)	Zaatir 6	BVUSS, Budaörs; Referees: Andorka, Hucker (HUN)
10 August 2013; 16:15	4× (yellow card) 10× (suspension)	Report	3× (yellow card) 3× (suspension) 1× (red card)	BVUSS, Budaörs; Referees: Andorka, Hucker (HUN)

10 August 2013; 18:30	Slovenia	27 – 27	Romania	BVUSS, Budaörs; Attendance: 350; Referees: Kulik, Nabokau (BLR)
10 August 2013; 18:30	Kodrin, Fizuleto 5	(14–12)	Negru 14	BVUSS, Budaörs; Attendance: 350; Referees: Kulik, Nabokau (BLR)
10 August 2013; 18:30	4× (yellow card) 4× (suspension)	Report	4× (yellow card) 3× (suspension)	BVUSS, Budaörs; Attendance: 350; Referees: Kulik, Nabokau (BLR)

10 August 2013; 20:45	Qatar	33 – 32	South Korea	BVUSS, Budaörs; Attendance: 150; Referees: Mata, López (ESP)
10 August 2013; 20:45	Al-Buainanin, Kapić 6	(16–19)	Lim Jae-Seo 10	BVUSS, Budaörs; Attendance: 150; Referees: Mata, López (ESP)
10 August 2013; 20:45	4× (yellow card) 5× (suspension) 1× (red card)	Report	2× (yellow card) 5× (suspension)	BVUSS, Budaörs; Attendance: 150; Referees: Mata, López (ESP)

12 August 2013; 13:45	Romania	32 – 27	Qatar	BVUSS, Budaörs; Attendance: 300; Referees: Leszczynski, Piechota (POL)
12 August 2013; 13:45	Negru 8	(18–15)	three players 5	BVUSS, Budaörs; Attendance: 300; Referees: Leszczynski, Piechota (POL)
12 August 2013; 13:45	3× (yellow card) 5× (suspension)	Report	3× (yellow card) 4× (suspension) 1× (red card)	BVUSS, Budaörs; Attendance: 300; Referees: Leszczynski, Piechota (POL)

12 August 2013; 16:00	Tunisia	29 – 32	Slovenia	BVUSS, Budaörs; Attendance: 250; Referees: Schulze, Tönnies (GER)
12 August 2013; 16:00	Sassi 8	(14–18)	Bratković 8	BVUSS, Budaörs; Attendance: 250; Referees: Schulze, Tönnies (GER)
12 August 2013; 16:00	3× (yellow card) 6× (suspension)	Report	3× (yellow card) 3× (suspension)	BVUSS, Budaörs; Attendance: 250; Referees: Schulze, Tönnies (GER)

12 August 2013; 18:15	South Korea	28 – 37	Sweden	BVUSS, Budaörs; Attendance: 250; Referees: Lenci, Grillo (ARG)
12 August 2013; 18:15	Ha Tae-Hyun 6	(14–14)	Konradsson, Zetterman 7	BVUSS, Budaörs; Attendance: 250; Referees: Lenci, Grillo (ARG)
12 August 2013; 18:15	2× (yellow card) 4× (suspension)	Report	4× (yellow card) 3× (suspension)	BVUSS, Budaörs; Attendance: 250; Referees: Lenci, Grillo (ARG)

13 August 2013; 16:15	Slovenia	25 – 26	Qatar	BVUSS, Budaörs; Attendance: 220; Referees: Andorka, Hucker (HUN)
13 August 2013; 16:15	Kodrin 5	(13–15)	Bendevis 8	BVUSS, Budaörs; Attendance: 220; Referees: Andorka, Hucker (HUN)
13 August 2013; 16:15	3× (yellow card) 3× (suspension)	Report	3× (yellow card) 5× (suspension)	BVUSS, Budaörs; Attendance: 220; Referees: Andorka, Hucker (HUN)

13 August 2013; 18:30	Tunisia	31 – 30	South Korea	BVUSS, Budaörs; Attendance: 200; Referees: Fonseca, Santos (POR)
13 August 2013; 18:30	Douiri, Sassi 7	(15–12)	Ha Tae-Hyun 8	BVUSS, Budaörs; Attendance: 200; Referees: Fonseca, Santos (POR)
13 August 2013; 18:30	3× (yellow card) 9× (suspension) 1× (red card)	Report	4× (yellow card) 3× (suspension)	BVUSS, Budaörs; Attendance: 200; Referees: Fonseca, Santos (POR)

13 August 2013; 20:45	Sweden	38 – 29	Romania	BVUSS, Budaörs; Attendance: 300; Referees: Mata, López (ESP)
13 August 2013; 20:45	Olsson 7	(19–15)	Racoțea 7	BVUSS, Budaörs; Attendance: 300; Referees: Mata, López (ESP)
13 August 2013; 20:45	3× (yellow card) 3× (suspension)	Report	2× (yellow card) 1× (suspension)	BVUSS, Budaörs; Attendance: 300; Referees: Mata, López (ESP)

15 August 2013; 14:00	Slovenia	39 – 28	South Korea	BVUSS, Budaörs; Attendance: 400; Referees: Leszczynski, Piechota (POL)
15 August 2013; 14:00	Gjerek 12	(20–16)	Ha Tae-Hyun 9	BVUSS, Budaörs; Attendance: 400; Referees: Leszczynski, Piechota (POL)
15 August 2013; 14:00	3× (yellow card) 6× (suspension)	Report	3× (yellow card) 5× (suspension)	BVUSS, Budaörs; Attendance: 400; Referees: Leszczynski, Piechota (POL)

15 August 2013; 16:15	Qatar	14 – 30	Sweden	BVUSS, Budaörs; Attendance: 180; Referees: Kulik, Nabokau (BLR)
15 August 2013; 16:15	Al-Safadi 3	(7–13)	Hallen 5	BVUSS, Budaörs; Attendance: 180; Referees: Kulik, Nabokau (BLR)
15 August 2013; 16:15	2× (yellow card) 4× (suspension)	Report	3× (yellow card) 2× (suspension)	BVUSS, Budaörs; Attendance: 180; Referees: Kulik, Nabokau (BLR)

15 August 2013; 18:30	Romania	28 – 18	Tunisia	BVUSS, Budaörs; Attendance: 300; Referees: Grillo, Lenci (ARG)
15 August 2013; 18:30	Negru 9	(17–5)	Zaatir 6	BVUSS, Budaörs; Attendance: 300; Referees: Grillo, Lenci (ARG)
15 August 2013; 18:30	3× (yellow card) 3× (suspension)	Report	3× (yellow card) 7× (suspension)	BVUSS, Budaörs; Attendance: 300; Referees: Grillo, Lenci (ARG)

16 August 2013; 11:45	Sweden	32 – 28	Slovenia	Városi Sportcsarnok, Érd; Attendance: 200; Referees: Kolahdouzan, Mousavian (IRN)
16 August 2013; 11:45	Konradsson 8	(16–14)	Kodrin 8	Városi Sportcsarnok, Érd; Attendance: 200; Referees: Kolahdouzan, Mousavian (IRN)
16 August 2013; 11:45	3× (yellow card) 7× (suspension)	Report	4× (yellow card) 5× (suspension) 1× (red card)	Városi Sportcsarnok, Érd; Attendance: 200; Referees: Kolahdouzan, Mousavian (IRN)

16 August 2013; 16:15	South Korea	37 – 34	Romania	BVUSS, Budaörs; Attendance: 250; Referees: Salah, Brunner (SUI)
16 August 2013; 16:15	Ha Tae-Hyun 14	(20–18)	Rotaru 11	BVUSS, Budaörs; Attendance: 250; Referees: Salah, Brunner (SUI)
16 August 2013; 16:15	3× (yellow card) 5× (suspension)	Report	2× (yellow card) 3× (suspension)	BVUSS, Budaörs; Attendance: 250; Referees: Salah, Brunner (SUI)

16 August 2013; 18:30	Qatar	22 – 21	Tunisia	BVUSS, Budaörs; Attendance: 200; Referees: Mata, López (ESP)
16 August 2013; 18:30	Bendevis 6	(9–9)	Abdelli 10	BVUSS, Budaörs; Attendance: 200; Referees: Mata, López (ESP)
16 August 2013; 18:30	3× (yellow card) 1× (suspension)	Report	2× (yellow card) 6× (suspension)	BVUSS, Budaörs; Attendance: 200; Referees: Mata, López (ESP)

=== Group C ===
Team	Pld	W	D	L	GF	GA	GD	Pts
Spain	5	4	0	1	156	126	+30	8
Croatia	5	4	0	1	165	129	+36	8
France	5	3	0	2	156	127	+29	6
Brazil	5	3	0	2	163	123	+40	6
Argentina	5	1	0	4	122	172	−50	2
Angola	5	0	0	5	110	195	−85	0

10 August 2013; 09:30	Spain	24 – 25	Brazil	Városi Sportcsarnok, Érd; Referees: Schulze, Tönnies (GER)
10 August 2013; 09:30	Azkue Saizar 5	(10–11)	Santos 8	Városi Sportcsarnok, Érd; Referees: Schulze, Tönnies (GER)
10 August 2013; 09:30	3× (yellow card) 4× (suspension)	Report	3× (yellow card) 8× (suspension)	Városi Sportcsarnok, Érd; Referees: Schulze, Tönnies (GER)

10 August 2013; 11:45	Croatia	29 – 28	France	Városi Sportcsarnok, Érd; Attendance: 500; Referees: Fonseca, Santos (POR)
10 August 2013; 11:45	Mihić, Kuduz 7	(11–12)	three players 5	Városi Sportcsarnok, Érd; Attendance: 500; Referees: Fonseca, Santos (POR)
10 August 2013; 11:45	3× (yellow card) 3× (suspension)	Report	3× (yellow card) 6× (suspension)	Városi Sportcsarnok, Érd; Attendance: 500; Referees: Fonseca, Santos (POR)

10 August 2013; 14:00	Argentina	30 – 26	Angola	Városi Sportcsarnok, Érd; Attendance: 300; Referees: Kolahdouzan, Mousavian (IRN)
10 August 2013; 14:00	Rodríguez 7	(13–12)	Cassange 8	Városi Sportcsarnok, Érd; Attendance: 300; Referees: Kolahdouzan, Mousavian (IRN)
10 August 2013; 14:00	3× (yellow card) 6× (suspension)	Report	3× (yellow card) 4× (suspension)	Városi Sportcsarnok, Érd; Attendance: 300; Referees: Kolahdouzan, Mousavian (IRN)

12 August 2013; 16:00	Brazil	29 – 30	Croatia	Városi Sportcsarnok, Érd; Attendance: 200; Referees: Johansson, Kliko (SWE)
12 August 2013; 16:00	Toledo 10	(14–15)	Mihić 9	Városi Sportcsarnok, Érd; Attendance: 200; Referees: Johansson, Kliko (SWE)
12 August 2013; 16:00	3× (yellow card) 4× (suspension) 1× (red card)	Report	3× (yellow card) 4× (suspension)	Városi Sportcsarnok, Érd; Attendance: 200; Referees: Johansson, Kliko (SWE)

12 August 2013; 18:15	Angola	21 – 38	Spain	Városi Sportcsarnok, Érd; Attendance: 250; Referees: Kulik, Nabokau (BLR)
12 August 2013; 18:15	Cassagne 7	(10–17)	Péréz Lopéz, Azkue Saizar 6	Városi Sportcsarnok, Érd; Attendance: 250; Referees: Kulik, Nabokau (BLR)
12 August 2013; 18:15	2× (yellow card) 6× (suspension)	Report	3× (yellow card) 2× (suspension)	Városi Sportcsarnok, Érd; Attendance: 250; Referees: Kulik, Nabokau (BLR)

12 August 2013; 20:30	France	28 – 22	Argentina	Városi Sportcsarnok, Érd; Attendance: 200; Referees: Koo, Lee (KOR)
12 August 2013; 20:30	Vigneron, Seri 4	(13–9)	Rodríguez 9	Városi Sportcsarnok, Érd; Attendance: 200; Referees: Koo, Lee (KOR)
12 August 2013; 20:30	3× (yellow card) 3× (suspension)	Report	3× (yellow card) 5× (suspension)	Városi Sportcsarnok, Érd; Attendance: 200; Referees: Koo, Lee (KOR)

13 August 2013; 14:00	Brazil	39 – 18	Angola	Városi Sportcsarnok, Érd; Attendance: 100; Referees: Guzmán, Pérez (PUR)
13 August 2013; 14:00	Andrade 7	(16–8)	Cassange 6	Városi Sportcsarnok, Érd; Attendance: 100; Referees: Guzmán, Pérez (PUR)
13 August 2013; 14:00	3× (yellow card) 4× (suspension)	Report	3× (yellow card) 2× (suspension)	Városi Sportcsarnok, Érd; Attendance: 100; Referees: Guzmán, Pérez (PUR)

13 August 2013; 16:15	Croatia	39 – 18	Argentina	Városi Sportcsarnok, Érd; Attendance: 500; Referees: Leszczynski, Piechota (POL)
13 August 2013; 16:15	Grbavac, Božić Pavletić 6	(21–8)	Rodríguez 9	Városi Sportcsarnok, Érd; Attendance: 500; Referees: Leszczynski, Piechota (POL)
13 August 2013; 16:15	3× (yellow card) 3× (suspension)	Report	3× (yellow card) 5× (suspension)	Városi Sportcsarnok, Érd; Attendance: 500; Referees: Leszczynski, Piechota (POL)

13 August 2013; 20:45	Spain	31 – 25	France	Városi Sportcsarnok, Érd; Attendance: 500; Referees: Krichene, Makhlouf (TUN)
13 August 2013; 20:45	Azkue Saizar 6	(15–13)	Delecroix 7	Városi Sportcsarnok, Érd; Attendance: 500; Referees: Krichene, Makhlouf (TUN)
13 August 2013; 20:45	2× (yellow card)	Report	1× (yellow card) 5× (suspension)	Városi Sportcsarnok, Érd; Attendance: 500; Referees: Krichene, Makhlouf (TUN)

15 August 2013; 14:00	Croatia	39 – 25	Angola	Városi Sportcsarnok, Érd; Attendance: 200; Referees: Krichene, Makhlouf (TUN)
15 August 2013; 14:00	Mihić 10	(20–7)	Cassang 9	Városi Sportcsarnok, Érd; Attendance: 200; Referees: Krichene, Makhlouf (TUN)
15 August 2013; 14:00	3× (yellow card) 6× (suspension)	Report	3× (yellow card) 3× (suspension)	Városi Sportcsarnok, Érd; Attendance: 200; Referees: Krichene, Makhlouf (TUN)

15 August 2013; 16:15	Argentina	27 – 34	Spain	Városi Sportcsarnok, Érd; Referees: Brunner, Salah (SUI)
15 August 2013; 16:15	four players 5	(14–17)	López Álvarez 11	Városi Sportcsarnok, Érd; Referees: Brunner, Salah (SUI)
15 August 2013; 16:15	3× (yellow card) 3× (suspension)	Report	3× (yellow card) 6× (suspension)	Városi Sportcsarnok, Érd; Referees: Brunner, Salah (SUI)

15 August 2013; 18:30	France	26 – 25	Brazil	Városi Sportcsarnok, Érd; Attendance: 300; Referees: Johansson, Kliko (SWE)
15 August 2013; 18:30	Tritta, Bouilly 5	(11–11)	Toledo 7	Városi Sportcsarnok, Érd; Attendance: 300; Referees: Johansson, Kliko (SWE)
15 August 2013; 18:30	4× (yellow card) 5× (suspension)	Report	3× (yellow card) 3× (suspension)	Városi Sportcsarnok, Érd; Attendance: 300; Referees: Johansson, Kliko (SWE)

16 August 2013; 14:00	Argentina	25 – 45	Brazil	Városi Sportcsarnok, Érd; Attendance: 300; Referees: Lee, Koo (KOR)
16 August 2013; 14:00	Rodríguez 10	(10–20)	Silva 7	Városi Sportcsarnok, Érd; Attendance: 300; Referees: Lee, Koo (KOR)
16 August 2013; 14:00	3× (yellow card) 7× (suspension)	Report	3× (yellow card) 4× (suspension)	Városi Sportcsarnok, Érd; Attendance: 300; Referees: Lee, Koo (KOR)

16 August 2013; 16:15	Spain	29 – 28	Croatia	Városi Sportcsarnok, Érd; Attendance: 300; Referees: Leszczynski, Piechota (POL)
16 August 2013; 16:15	López Álvarez 8	(12–14)	Mihić 6	Városi Sportcsarnok, Érd; Attendance: 300; Referees: Leszczynski, Piechota (POL)
16 August 2013; 16:15	3× (yellow card) 3× (suspension) 1× (red card)	Report	3× (yellow card) 6× (suspension)	Városi Sportcsarnok, Érd; Attendance: 300; Referees: Leszczynski, Piechota (POL)

16 August 2013; 20:45	Angola	20 – 49	France	Városi Sportcsarnok, Érd; Attendance: 200; Referees: Stokes, Bartlett (GBR)
16 August 2013; 20:45	Cassange 6	(12–23)	Marie Joseph 9	Városi Sportcsarnok, Érd; Attendance: 200; Referees: Stokes, Bartlett (GBR)
16 August 2013; 20:45	3× (yellow card) 3× (suspension)	Report	2× (yellow card)	Városi Sportcsarnok, Érd; Attendance: 200; Referees: Stokes, Bartlett (GBR)

=== Group D ===
Team	Pld	W	D	L	GF	GA	GD	Pts
Germany	5	5	0	0	197	109	+88	10
Norway	5	4	0	1	163	116	+47	8
Austria	5	2	1	2	142	112	+30	5
Hungary	5	2	1	2	134	120	+14	5
Venezuela	5	1	0	4	99	193	−94	2
Gabon	5	0	0	5	99	184	−85	0

9 August 2013; 19:30	Hungary	39 – 17	Venezuela	BVUSS, Budaörs; Attendance: 1,105; Referees: Brunner, Salah (SUI)
9 August 2013; 19:30	Bujdoso 11	(19–10)	Palacios 6	BVUSS, Budaörs; Attendance: 1,105; Referees: Brunner, Salah (SUI)
9 August 2013; 19:30	3× (yellow card) 5× (suspension)	Report	3× (yellow card) 3× (suspension)	BVUSS, Budaörs; Attendance: 1,105; Referees: Brunner, Salah (SUI)

10 August 2013; 16:15	Germany	37 – 30	Norway	Városi Sportcsarnok, Érd; Attendance: 1,000; Referees: Leszczynski, Piechota (POL)
10 August 2013; 16:15	Suton 9	(19–13)	Sagosen 12	Városi Sportcsarnok, Érd; Attendance: 1,000; Referees: Leszczynski, Piechota (POL)
10 August 2013; 16:15	2× (yellow card) 5× (suspension)	Report	4× (yellow card) 4× (suspension)	Városi Sportcsarnok, Érd; Attendance: 1,000; Referees: Leszczynski, Piechota (POL)

10 August 2013; 18:30	Austria	37 – 22	Gabon	Városi Sportcsarnok, Érd; Attendance: 700; Referees: Koo, Lee (KOR)
10 August 2013; 18:30	Bilyk 8	(19–11)	Somand 8	Városi Sportcsarnok, Érd; Attendance: 700; Referees: Koo, Lee (KOR)
10 August 2013; 18:30	4× (yellow card) 5× (suspension)	Report	3× (yellow card) 6× (suspension)	Városi Sportcsarnok, Érd; Attendance: 700; Referees: Koo, Lee (KOR)

11 August 2013; 16:00	Norway	24 – 22	Austria	Városi Sportcsarnok, Érd; Attendance: 500; Referees: Krichene, Makhlouf (TUN)
11 August 2013; 16:00	Pedersen 6	(14–15)	Neuhold 8	Városi Sportcsarnok, Érd; Attendance: 500; Referees: Krichene, Makhlouf (TUN)
11 August 2013; 16:00	3× (yellow card) 6× (suspension)	Report	3× (yellow card) 3× (suspension)	Városi Sportcsarnok, Érd; Attendance: 500; Referees: Krichene, Makhlouf (TUN)

11 August 2013; 18:15	Gabon	17 – 29	Hungary	Városi Sportcsarnok, Érd; Attendance: 1,100; Referees: Kolahdouzan, Mousavian (IRN)
11 August 2013; 18:15	Nguema Aboghe 6	(9–15)	Kovacsics 6	Városi Sportcsarnok, Érd; Attendance: 1,100; Referees: Kolahdouzan, Mousavian (IRN)
11 August 2013; 18:15	3× (yellow card) 3× (suspension)	Report	3× (yellow card) 5× (suspension)	Városi Sportcsarnok, Érd; Attendance: 1,100; Referees: Kolahdouzan, Mousavian (IRN)

11 August 2013; 20:30	Venezuela	19 – 46	Germany	Városi Sportcsarnok, Érd; Attendance: 100; Referees: Akpatsa, Assignon (TOG)
11 August 2013; 20:30	three players 4	(8–24)	Jäger 12	Városi Sportcsarnok, Érd; Attendance: 100; Referees: Akpatsa, Assignon (TOG)
11 August 2013; 20:30	2× (yellow card) 5× (suspension)	Report	3× (yellow card) 5× (suspension)	Városi Sportcsarnok, Érd; Attendance: 100; Referees: Akpatsa, Assignon (TOG)

13 August 2013; 09:30	Norway	40 – 16	Venezuela	Városi Sportcsarnok, Érd; Attendance: 100; Referees: Stokes, Bartlett (GBR)
13 August 2013; 09:30	Matic 11	(21–7)	Huebdian 6	Városi Sportcsarnok, Érd; Attendance: 100; Referees: Stokes, Bartlett (GBR)
13 August 2013; 09:30	3× (yellow card) 2× (suspension)	Report	2× (yellow card) 5× (suspension)	Városi Sportcsarnok, Érd; Attendance: 100; Referees: Stokes, Bartlett (GBR)

13 August 2013; 11:45	Germany	43 – 12	Gabon	Városi Sportcsarnok, Érd; Attendance: 250; Referees: Kulik, Nabokau (BLR)
13 August 2013; 11:45	Ritterbach 8	(22–7)	Litona Somand 4	Városi Sportcsarnok, Érd; Attendance: 250; Referees: Kulik, Nabokau (BLR)
13 August 2013; 11:45	2× (yellow card) 5× (suspension)	Report	2× (yellow card) 4× (suspension)	Városi Sportcsarnok, Érd; Attendance: 250; Referees: Kulik, Nabokau (BLR)

13 August 2013; 18:30	Austria	20 – 20	Hungary	Városi Sportcsarnok, Érd; Attendance: 2,500; Referees: Kliko, Johansson (SWE)
13 August 2013; 18:30	Neuhold 7	(8–8)	three players 4	Városi Sportcsarnok, Érd; Attendance: 2,500; Referees: Kliko, Johansson (SWE)
13 August 2013; 18:30	4× (yellow card) 6× (suspension)	Report	4× (yellow card) 8× (suspension)	Városi Sportcsarnok, Érd; Attendance: 2,500; Referees: Kliko, Johansson (SWE)

14 August 2013; 16:00	Austria	38 – 15	Venezuela	Városi Sportcsarnok, Érd; Attendance: 200; Referees: Guzmán, Pérez (PUR)
14 August 2013; 16:00	Lomoschitz 9	(16–7)	Huebdian, Henriquez 4	Városi Sportcsarnok, Érd; Attendance: 200; Referees: Guzmán, Pérez (PUR)
14 August 2013; 16:00	3× (yellow card) 3× (suspension)	Report	2× (yellow card) 10× (suspension) 1× (red card)	Városi Sportcsarnok, Érd; Attendance: 200; Referees: Guzmán, Pérez (PUR)

14 August 2013; 18:15	Hungary	23 – 40	Germany	BVUSS, Budaörs; Attendance: 1,400; Referees: Koo, Lee (KOR)
14 August 2013; 18:15	Nagy 4	(11–16)	Drux, Kunkel 7	BVUSS, Budaörs; Attendance: 1,400; Referees: Koo, Lee (KOR)
14 August 2013; 18:15	3× (yellow card) 6× (suspension)	Report	2× (yellow card) 5× (suspension)	BVUSS, Budaörs; Attendance: 1,400; Referees: Koo, Lee (KOR)

14 August 2013; 18:15	Gabon	18 – 43	Norway	Városi Sportcsarnok, Érd; Attendance: 250; Referees: Grillo, Lenci (ARG)
14 August 2013; 18:15	Nguema Aboghe 7	(7–22)	Matic 11	Városi Sportcsarnok, Érd; Attendance: 250; Referees: Grillo, Lenci (ARG)
14 August 2013; 18:15	2× (yellow card) 2× (suspension) 1× (red card)	Report	2× (yellow card) 1× (suspension)	Városi Sportcsarnok, Érd; Attendance: 250; Referees: Grillo, Lenci (ARG)

16 August 2013; 09:30	Venezuela	32 – 30	Gabon	Városi Sportcsarnok, Érd; Attendance: 200; Referees: Nabokau, Kulik (BLR)
16 August 2013; 09:30	Huebdian 10	(16–14)	Nguema Aboghe 10	Városi Sportcsarnok, Érd; Attendance: 200; Referees: Nabokau, Kulik (BLR)
16 August 2013; 09:30	3× (yellow card) 2× (suspension) 1× (red card)	Report	2× (yellow card) 5× (suspension)	Városi Sportcsarnok, Érd; Attendance: 200; Referees: Nabokau, Kulik (BLR)

16 August 2013; 18:30	Hungary	23 – 26	Norway	Városi Sportcsarnok, Érd; Attendance: 2,500; Referees: Santos, Fonseca (POR)
16 August 2013; 18:30	Faluvegi 7	(13–16)	Eriksen 9	Városi Sportcsarnok, Érd; Attendance: 2,500; Referees: Santos, Fonseca (POR)
16 August 2013; 18:30	4× (yellow card) 6× (suspension) 1× (red card)	Report	3× (yellow card) 5× (suspension)	Városi Sportcsarnok, Érd; Attendance: 2,500; Referees: Santos, Fonseca (POR)

16 August 2013; 20:45	Germany	31 – 25	Austria	BVUSS, Budaörs; Attendance: 200; Referees: Grillo, Lenci (ARG)
16 August 2013; 20:45	Hausmann 6	(17–12)	Neuhold 6	BVUSS, Budaörs; Attendance: 200; Referees: Grillo, Lenci (ARG)
16 August 2013; 20:45	3× (yellow card) 4× (suspension)	Report	3× (yellow card) 3× (suspension)	BVUSS, Budaörs; Attendance: 200; Referees: Grillo, Lenci (ARG)

== Knockout round ==
=== Championship ===
Round of 16
B1	Sweden	31
A4	Belarus	21
D3	Austria	25
C2	Croatia	29
B3	Slovenia	33
A2	Egypt	29
D1	Germany	35
C4	Brazil	26
C3	France	25
D2	Norway	35
A1	Denmark	35
B4	Romania	14
A3	Serbia	27
B2	Qatar	24
C1	Spain	25
D4	Hungary	23

Quarterfinals
B1	Sweden	22
C2	Croatia	27
B3	Slovenia	32
D1	Germany	37
D2	Norway	19
A1	Denmark	35
A3	Serbia	20
C1	Spain	21

Semifinals
C2	Croatia	29
D1	Germany	26
A1	Denmark	32
C1	Spain	23

Final
C2	Croatia	26
A1	Denmark	32
Third place
D1	Germany	29
C1	Spain	23

==== Round of 16 ====
18 August 2013; 14:00	Sweden	31 – 21	Belarus	BVUSS, Budaörs; Attendance: 230; Referees: Koo, Lee (KOR)
18 August 2013; 14:00	Karlsson 7	(17–11)	Harbuz 6	BVUSS, Budaörs; Attendance: 230; Referees: Koo, Lee (KOR)
18 August 2013; 14:00	3× (yellow card) 3× (suspension)	Report	2× (yellow card) 5× (suspension)	BVUSS, Budaörs; Attendance: 230; Referees: Koo, Lee (KOR)

18 August 2013; 14:00	France	25 – 35	Norway	Városi Sportcsarnok, Érd; Attendance: 400; Referees: Kolahdouzan, Mousavian (IRN)
18 August 2013; 14:00	Bouilly 7	(13–21)	Sagosen, Eriksen 8	Városi Sportcsarnok, Érd; Attendance: 400; Referees: Kolahdouzan, Mousavian (IRN)
18 August 2013; 14:00	3× (yellow card)	Report	3× (yellow card) 4× (suspension)	Városi Sportcsarnok, Érd; Attendance: 400; Referees: Kolahdouzan, Mousavian (IRN)

18 August 2013; 16:15	Austria	25 – 29	Croatia	BVUSS, Budaörs; Attendance: 400; Referees: Andorka, Hucker (HUN)
18 August 2013; 16:15	Frimmel 9	(11–13)	Mihić 7	BVUSS, Budaörs; Attendance: 400; Referees: Andorka, Hucker (HUN)
18 August 2013; 16:15	2× (yellow card) 2× (suspension)	Report	3× (yellow card) 4× (suspension)	BVUSS, Budaörs; Attendance: 400; Referees: Andorka, Hucker (HUN)

18 August 2013; 16:15	Denmark	35 – 14	Romania	Városi Sportcsarnok, Érd; Attendance: 1,000; Referees: Krichene, Makhlouf (TUN)
18 August 2013; 16:15	Stoklund Larsen, Hald Jensen 6	(15–8)	Rotaru 4	Városi Sportcsarnok, Érd; Attendance: 1,000; Referees: Krichene, Makhlouf (TUN)
18 August 2013; 16:15	3× (yellow card) 4× (suspension)	Report	3× (yellow card) 1× (suspension)	Városi Sportcsarnok, Érd; Attendance: 1,000; Referees: Krichene, Makhlouf (TUN)

18 August 2013; 18:30	Slovenia	33 – 29	Egypt	BVUSS, Budaörs; Attendance: 300; Referees: Johansson, Kliko (SWE)
18 August 2013; 18:30	Kodrin 8	(15–13)	Amr Badawy 8	BVUSS, Budaörs; Attendance: 300; Referees: Johansson, Kliko (SWE)
18 August 2013; 18:30	3× (yellow card) 11× (suspension)	Report	4× (yellow card) 5× (suspension)	BVUSS, Budaörs; Attendance: 300; Referees: Johansson, Kliko (SWE)

18 August 2013; 18:30	Spain	25 – 23	Hungary	Városi Sportcsarnok, Érd; Attendance: 2,500; Referees: Grillo, Lenci (ARG)
18 August 2013; 18:30	Azkue Saizar 7	(14–9)	Nagy 7	Városi Sportcsarnok, Érd; Attendance: 2,500; Referees: Grillo, Lenci (ARG)
18 August 2013; 18:30	4× (yellow card) 3× (suspension)	Report	3× (yellow card) 6× (suspension)	Városi Sportcsarnok, Érd; Attendance: 2,500; Referees: Grillo, Lenci (ARG)

18 August 2013; 20:45	Germany	35 – 26	Brazil	BVUSS, Budaörs; Attendance: 200; Referees: Fonseca, Santos (POR)
18 August 2013; 20:45	Kunkel 10	(18–12)	Ponciano 7	BVUSS, Budaörs; Attendance: 200; Referees: Fonseca, Santos (POR)
18 August 2013; 20:45	2× (yellow card) 4× (suspension) 1× (red card)	Report	4× (yellow card) 8× (suspension)	BVUSS, Budaörs; Attendance: 200; Referees: Fonseca, Santos (POR)

18 August 2013; 20:45	Serbia	27 – 24	Qatar	Városi Sportcsarnok, Érd; Attendance: 450; Referees: Leszczynski, Piechota (POL)
18 August 2013; 20:45	Mladenović, A. Radovanović 6	(10–10)	Saleh, Bendevis 6	Városi Sportcsarnok, Érd; Attendance: 450; Referees: Leszczynski, Piechota (POL)
18 August 2013; 20:45	4× (yellow card) 2× (suspension)	Report	3× (yellow card) 4× (suspension)	Városi Sportcsarnok, Érd; Attendance: 450; Referees: Leszczynski, Piechota (POL)

==== Quarterfinals ====
20 August 2013; 10:00	Sweden	22 – 27	Croatia	BVUSS, Budaörs; Attendance: 500; Referees: Mata, López (ESP)
20 August 2013; 10:00	Karlsson 4	(11–13)	Mamić 11	BVUSS, Budaörs; Attendance: 500; Referees: Mata, López (ESP)
20 August 2013; 10:00	3× (yellow card) 1× (suspension)	Report	2× (yellow card) 5× (suspension)	BVUSS, Budaörs; Attendance: 500; Referees: Mata, López (ESP)

20 August 2013; 10:00	Norway	19 – 35	Denmark	Városi Sportcsarnok, Érd; Attendance: 100; Referees: Schulze, Tönnies (GER)
20 August 2013; 10:00	Pedersen 4	(7–16)	Holst Jensen 7	Városi Sportcsarnok, Érd; Attendance: 100; Referees: Schulze, Tönnies (GER)
20 August 2013; 10:00	3× (yellow card) 5× (suspension)	Report	2× (yellow card) 4× (suspension)	Városi Sportcsarnok, Érd; Attendance: 100; Referees: Schulze, Tönnies (GER)

20 August 2013
12:30
Slovenia
32 – 37 (ET)
Germany
BVUSS, Budaörs
Attendance: 500
Referees: Leszczynski, Piechota (POL)
Gjerek, Bratkovic 6
(16–15)
Drux 10
3× (yellow card) 6× (suspension)
Report
3× (yellow card) 5× (suspension)

FT: 29–29 ET: 3–8

20 August 2013; 12:30	Serbia	20 – 21	Spain	Városi Sportcsarnok, Érd; Attendance: 400; Referees: Johansson, Kliko (SWE)
20 August 2013; 12:30	Terzić 6	(12–12)	Sánchez Migallón, García Barcelo 5	Városi Sportcsarnok, Érd; Attendance: 400; Referees: Johansson, Kliko (SWE)
20 August 2013; 12:30	3× (yellow card) 1× (suspension)	Report	3× (yellow card) 1× (suspension)	Városi Sportcsarnok, Érd; Attendance: 400; Referees: Johansson, Kliko (SWE)

==== Semifinals ====
21 August 2013; 17:30	Croatia	29 – 26	Germany	Városi Sportcsarnok, Érd; Attendance: 500; Referees: Fonseca, Santos (POR)
21 August 2013; 17:30	Mamić 9	(13–15)	Suton 10	Városi Sportcsarnok, Érd; Attendance: 500; Referees: Fonseca, Santos (POR)
21 August 2013; 17:30	3× (yellow card) 3× (suspension) 1× (red card)	Report	3× (yellow card) 5× (suspension)	Városi Sportcsarnok, Érd; Attendance: 500; Referees: Fonseca, Santos (POR)

21 August 2013; 20:00	Denmark	32 – 23	Spain	BVUSS, Budaörs; Attendance: 800; Referees: Koo, Lee (KOR)
21 August 2013; 20:00	Hald Jensen 9	(17–13)	Fernandéz Clemente 4	BVUSS, Budaörs; Attendance: 800; Referees: Koo, Lee (KOR)
21 August 2013; 20:00	3× (yellow card) 3× (suspension)	Report	3× (yellow card) 2× (suspension)	BVUSS, Budaörs; Attendance: 800; Referees: Koo, Lee (KOR)

==== Third place game ====
23 August 2013; 14:30	Germany	29 – 23	Spain	Városi Sportcsarnok, Érd; Attendance: 2,500; Referees: Johansson, Kliko (SWE)
23 August 2013; 14:30	Kunkel 8	(13–15)	Carmona Agustin 5	Városi Sportcsarnok, Érd; Attendance: 2,500; Referees: Johansson, Kliko (SWE)
23 August 2013; 14:30	3× (yellow card) 5× (suspension)	Report	3× (yellow card) 5× (suspension)	Városi Sportcsarnok, Érd; Attendance: 2,500; Referees: Johansson, Kliko (SWE)

==== Final ====
23 August 2013; 17:00	Croatia	26 – 32	Denmark	Városi Sportcsarnok, Érd; Attendance: 2,000; Referees: Schulze, Tönnies (GER)
23 August 2013; 17:00	Mihić 5	(12–12)	Stoklund Larsen 10	Városi Sportcsarnok, Érd; Attendance: 2,000; Referees: Schulze, Tönnies (GER)
23 August 2013; 17:00	4× (yellow card) 7× (suspension)	Report	3× (yellow card) 4× (suspension)	Városi Sportcsarnok, Érd; Attendance: 2,000; Referees: Schulze, Tönnies (GER)

=== 5–8th place playoff ===
5–8th place semifinals
22 August
Sweden	33
Slovenia	22
22 August
Norway	26
Serbia	24

Fifth place game
23 August
Sweden	20
Norway	26
Seventh place game
23 August
Slovenia	31
Serbia	39

==== 5–8th place semifinals ====
22 August 2013; 15:00	Sweden	33 – 22	Slovenia	BVUSS, Budaörs; Attendance: 100; Referees: Fonseca, Santos (POR)
22 August 2013; 15:00	Hallen 9	(19–9)	Kodrin 6	BVUSS, Budaörs; Attendance: 100; Referees: Fonseca, Santos (POR)
22 August 2013; 15:00	2× (yellow card) 4× (suspension) 1× (red card)	Report	4× (yellow card) 5× (suspension)	BVUSS, Budaörs; Attendance: 100; Referees: Fonseca, Santos (POR)

22 August 2013; 17:30	Norway	26 – 24	Serbia	BVUSS, Budaörs; Attendance: 400; Referees: Hucker, Andorka (HUN)
22 August 2013; 17:30	Sagosen 12	(13–11)	Mladenović 10	BVUSS, Budaörs; Attendance: 400; Referees: Hucker, Andorka (HUN)
22 August 2013; 17:30	2× (yellow card) 1× (suspension)	Report	2× (yellow card) 3× (suspension)	BVUSS, Budaörs; Attendance: 400; Referees: Hucker, Andorka (HUN)

==== Seventh place game ====
23 August 2013; 10:30	Slovenia	31 – 39	Serbia	BVUSS, Budaörs; Attendance: 200; Referees: Kolahdouzan, Mousavian (IRN)
23 August 2013; 10:30	Kodrin 7	(18–16)	Sotić 12	BVUSS, Budaörs; Attendance: 200; Referees: Kolahdouzan, Mousavian (IRN)
23 August 2013; 10:30	4× (yellow card) 3× (suspension)	Report	3× (yellow card) 7× (suspension)	BVUSS, Budaörs; Attendance: 200; Referees: Kolahdouzan, Mousavian (IRN)

==== Fifth place game ====
23 August 2013; 12:45	Sweden	20 – 26	Norway	BVUSS, Budaörs; Attendance: 100; Referees: Koo, Lee (KOR)
23 August 2013; 12:45	Fingren 6	(12–15)	Sagosen 6	BVUSS, Budaörs; Attendance: 100; Referees: Koo, Lee (KOR)
23 August 2013; 12:45	2× (yellow card) 3× (suspension)	Report	2× (yellow card) 4× (suspension)	BVUSS, Budaörs; Attendance: 100; Referees: Koo, Lee (KOR)

=== 9–16th place playoff ===
9–16th quarterfinals
19 August
Belarus	25
Austria	22
19 August
Egypt	33
Brazil	39
19 August
France	26
Romania	29
19 August
Qatar	18
Hungary	25

9–16th semifinals
21 August
Belarus	22
Brazil	33
21 August
Romania	22
Hungary	30

Ninth place game
22 August
Brazil	35
Hungary	29
Eleventh place game
22 August
Belarus	22
Romania	27

==== 9–16th quarterfinals ====
19 August 2013; 18:30	Belarus	25 – 22	Austria	BVUSS, Budaörs; Referees: Brunner, Salah (SUI)
19 August 2013; 18:30	Vailupau 9	(10–11)	Bilyk 5	BVUSS, Budaörs; Referees: Brunner, Salah (SUI)
19 August 2013; 18:30	3× (yellow card) 3× (suspension)	Report	3× (yellow card) 6× (suspension)	BVUSS, Budaörs; Referees: Brunner, Salah (SUI)

19 August 2013; 18:30	Qatar	18 – 25	Hungary	Városi Sportcsarnok, Érd; Attendance: 800; Referees: Schulze, Tönnies (GER)
19 August 2013; 18:30	Bendevis 8	(9–12)	Nagy 6	Városi Sportcsarnok, Érd; Attendance: 800; Referees: Schulze, Tönnies (GER)
19 August 2013; 18:30	3× (yellow card) 10× (suspension)	Report	3× (yellow card) 8× (suspension)	Városi Sportcsarnok, Érd; Attendance: 800; Referees: Schulze, Tönnies (GER)

19 August 2013; 20:45	Egypt	33 – 39	Brazil	BVUSS, Budaörs; Attendance: 100; Referees: Mata, López (ESP)
19 August 2013; 20:45	Hafez 7	(18–23)	Toledo 13	BVUSS, Budaörs; Attendance: 100; Referees: Mata, López (ESP)
19 August 2013; 20:45	2× (yellow card) 2× (suspension)	Report	2× (yellow card) 7× (suspension)	BVUSS, Budaörs; Attendance: 100; Referees: Mata, López (ESP)

19 August 2013; 20:45	France	26 – 29	Romania	Városi Sportcsarnok, Érd; Attendance: 300; Referees: Koo, Lee (KOR)
19 August 2013; 20:45	Villeminot 5	(13–14)	Negru 8	Városi Sportcsarnok, Érd; Attendance: 300; Referees: Koo, Lee (KOR)
19 August 2013; 20:45	3× (yellow card) 7× (suspension)	Report	2× (yellow card) 6× (suspension)	Városi Sportcsarnok, Érd; Attendance: 300; Referees: Koo, Lee (KOR)

==== 9–12th semifinals ====
21 August 2013; 15:00	Belarus	22 – 33	Brazil	BVUSS, Budaörs; Attendance: 100; Referees: Krichene, Makhlouf (TUN)
21 August 2013; 15:00	Harbuz 8	(13–14)	Toledo 9	BVUSS, Budaörs; Attendance: 100; Referees: Krichene, Makhlouf (TUN)
21 August 2013; 15:00	3× (yellow card) 4× (suspension)	Report	2× (yellow card) 4× (suspension) 1× (red card)	BVUSS, Budaörs; Attendance: 100; Referees: Krichene, Makhlouf (TUN)

21 August 2013; 15:00	Romania	22 – 30	Hungary	BVUSS, Budaörs; Attendance: 400; Referees: Brunner, Salah (SUI)
21 August 2013; 15:00	Negru 6	(6–16)	Stranigg 8	BVUSS, Budaörs; Attendance: 400; Referees: Brunner, Salah (SUI)
21 August 2013; 15:00	3× (yellow card) 4× (suspension)	Report	3× (yellow card) 7× (suspension)	BVUSS, Budaörs; Attendance: 400; Referees: Brunner, Salah (SUI)

==== Eleventh place game ====
22 August 2013; 20:00	Belarus	22 – 27	Romania	Városi Sportcsarnok, Érd; Attendance: 50; Referees: Bartlett, Stokes (GBR)
22 August 2013; 20:00	Gayduchenko 7	(12–12)	Racoțea 11	Városi Sportcsarnok, Érd; Attendance: 50; Referees: Bartlett, Stokes (GBR)
22 August 2013; 20:00	3× (yellow card) 4× (suspension)	Report	3× (yellow card) 1× (suspension)	Városi Sportcsarnok, Érd; Attendance: 50; Referees: Bartlett, Stokes (GBR)

==== Ninth place game ====
22 August 2013; 20:00	Brazil	35 – 29	Hungary	BVUSS, Budaörs; Attendance: 1,800; Referees: Kolahdouzan, Mousavian (IRN)
22 August 2013; 20:00	Toledo 10	(19–15)	Falugevi 8	BVUSS, Budaörs; Attendance: 1,800; Referees: Kolahdouzan, Mousavian (IRN)
22 August 2013; 20:00	3× (yellow card) 5× (suspension)	Report	3× (yellow card) 6× (suspension)	BVUSS, Budaörs; Attendance: 1,800; Referees: Kolahdouzan, Mousavian (IRN)

=== 13–16th place playoff ===
13–16th place semifinals
21 August
Austria	28
Egypt	36
21 August
France	29
Qatar	22

13th place game
22 August
Egypt	26
France	27
15th place game
22 August
Austria	27
Qatar	29

==== 13–16th place semifinals ====
21 August 2013; 17:30	Austria	28 – 36	Egypt	BVUSS, Budaörs; Attendance: 200; Referees: Grillo, Lenci (ARG)
21 August 2013; 17:30	Bilyk 6	(15–17)	Saad 11	BVUSS, Budaörs; Attendance: 200; Referees: Grillo, Lenci (ARG)
21 August 2013; 17:30	3× (yellow card) 5× (suspension)	Report	3× (yellow card) 5× (suspension)	BVUSS, Budaörs; Attendance: 200; Referees: Grillo, Lenci (ARG)

21 August 2013; 20:00	France	29 – 22	Qatar	Városi Sportcsarnok, Érd; Attendance: 100; Referees: Kulik, Nabokau (BLR)
21 August 2013; 20:00	Delecroix 6	(13–13)	Bendevis 10	Városi Sportcsarnok, Érd; Attendance: 100; Referees: Kulik, Nabokau (BLR)
21 August 2013; 20:00	3× (yellow card) 3× (suspension)	Report	3× (yellow card) 2× (suspension)	Városi Sportcsarnok, Érd; Attendance: 100; Referees: Kulik, Nabokau (BLR)

==== 15th place game ====
22 August 2013; 15:00	Austria	27 – 29	Qatar	Városi Sportcsarnok, Érd; Attendance: 100; Referees: Johansson, Kliko (SWE)
22 August 2013; 15:00	Bilyk 7	(16–12)	Berrached 10	Városi Sportcsarnok, Érd; Attendance: 100; Referees: Johansson, Kliko (SWE)
22 August 2013; 15:00	3× (yellow card) 4× (suspension)	Report	3× (yellow card) 4× (suspension)	Városi Sportcsarnok, Érd; Attendance: 100; Referees: Johansson, Kliko (SWE)

==== 13th place game ====
22 August 2013; 17:30	Egypt	26 – 27	France	Városi Sportcsarnok, Érd; Attendance: 200; Referees: Krichene, Makhlouf (TUN)
22 August 2013; 17:30	Mohsen Hassan, Adel Yousry Saad 5	(12–12)	Saidani, Tournat 5	Városi Sportcsarnok, Érd; Attendance: 200; Referees: Krichene, Makhlouf (TUN)
22 August 2013; 17:30	3× (yellow card) 1× (suspension)	Report	3× (yellow card) 3× (suspension)	Városi Sportcsarnok, Érd; Attendance: 200; Referees: Krichene, Makhlouf (TUN)

== President's Cup ==
=== 17–20th place playoff ===
17–20th place semifinals
18 August
Japan	43
Tunisia	31
18 August
Argentina	36
Venezuela	25

19th place game
19 August
Japan	42
Argentina	36
17th place game
19 August
Tunisia	43
Venezuela	28

==== 17–20th place semifinals ====
18 August 2013; 09:30	Japan	43 – 31	Tunisia	BVUSS, Budaörs; Attendance: 50; Referees: Guzmán, Pérez (PUR)
18 August 2013; 09:30	Tokuda 9	(23–15)	Abdelli 10	BVUSS, Budaörs; Attendance: 50; Referees: Guzmán, Pérez (PUR)
18 August 2013; 09:30	3× (yellow card) 1× (suspension)	Report	2× (yellow card) 5× (suspension)	BVUSS, Budaörs; Attendance: 50; Referees: Guzmán, Pérez (PUR)

18 August 2013; 09:30	Argentina	36 – 25	Venezuela	Városi Sportcsarnok, Érd; Attendance: 100; Referees: Bartlett, Stokes (GBR)
18 August 2013; 09:30	Rodríguez 12	(18–13)	Huebdian 7	Városi Sportcsarnok, Érd; Attendance: 100; Referees: Bartlett, Stokes (GBR)
18 August 2013; 09:30	3× (yellow card) 3× (suspension)	Report	2× (yellow card) 4× (suspension)	Városi Sportcsarnok, Érd; Attendance: 100; Referees: Bartlett, Stokes (GBR)

==== 17th place game ====
19 August 2013; 14:00	Venezuela	28 – 43	Tunisia	BVUSS, Budaörs; Attendance: 50; Referees: Akpatsa, Assignon (TOG)
19 August 2013; 14:00	Huebdian 8	(12–22)	Abdelli 10	BVUSS, Budaörs; Attendance: 50; Referees: Akpatsa, Assignon (TOG)
19 August 2013; 14:00		Report		BVUSS, Budaörs; Attendance: 50; Referees: Akpatsa, Assignon (TOG)

==== 19th place game ====
19 August 2013; 16:15	Argentina	36 – 42	Japan	BVUSS, Budaörs; Attendance: 200; Referees: Kulik, Nabokau (BLR)
19 August 2013; 16:15	Zungri 8	(16–18)	Tokuda 14	BVUSS, Budaörs; Attendance: 200; Referees: Kulik, Nabokau (BLR)
19 August 2013; 16:15	4× (yellow card) 6× (suspension)	Report	3× (yellow card) 4× (suspension)	BVUSS, Budaörs; Attendance: 200; Referees: Kulik, Nabokau (BLR)

=== 21–24th place playoff ===
21st–24th place semifinals
18 August
Chile	33
South Korea	40
18 August
Angola	29
Gabon	26

23rd place game
19 August
South Korea	34
Angola	21
21st place game
19 August
Chile	23
Gabon	24

==== 21st–24th place semifinals ====
18 August 2013; 11:45	Chile	33 – 40	South Korea	BVUSS, Budaörs; Attendance: 200; Referees: Brunner, Salah (SUI)
18 August 2013; 11:45	Adema 8	(16–22)	Park Young-Jun, Ha Tae-Hyun 8	BVUSS, Budaörs; Attendance: 200; Referees: Brunner, Salah (SUI)
18 August 2013; 11:45	1× (yellow card) 3× (suspension)	Report	3× (yellow card) 4× (suspension)	BVUSS, Budaörs; Attendance: 200; Referees: Brunner, Salah (SUI)

18 August 2013; 11:45	Angola	29 – 26	Gabon	Városi Sportcsarnok, Érd; Attendance: 150; Referees: Akpatsa, Assignon (TOG)
18 August 2013; 11:45	Pascoal 8	(16–13)	Nguema Aboghe 10	Városi Sportcsarnok, Érd; Attendance: 150; Referees: Akpatsa, Assignon (TOG)
18 August 2013; 11:45	3× (yellow card) 3× (suspension)	Report	3× (yellow card) 2× (suspension)	Városi Sportcsarnok, Érd; Attendance: 150; Referees: Akpatsa, Assignon (TOG)

==== 21st place game ====
19 August 2013; 14:00	Chile	23 – 24	Gabon	Városi Sportcsarnok, Érd; Attendance: 50; Referees: Leszczynski, Piechota (POL)
19 August 2013; 14:00	Adema, Ayala 6	(10–9)	Nguema Aboghe 8	Városi Sportcsarnok, Érd; Attendance: 50; Referees: Leszczynski, Piechota (POL)
19 August 2013; 14:00	3× (yellow card) 4× (suspension)	Report	3× (yellow card) 6× (suspension)	Városi Sportcsarnok, Érd; Attendance: 50; Referees: Leszczynski, Piechota (POL)

==== 23rd place game ====
19 August 2013; 16:15	South Korea	34 – 21	Angola	Városi Sportcsarnok, Érd; Attendance: 350; Referees: Guzmán, Pérez (PUR)
19 August 2013; 16:15	Park Young-Jun 7	(12–12)	Cassange 6	Városi Sportcsarnok, Érd; Attendance: 350; Referees: Guzmán, Pérez (PUR)
19 August 2013; 16:15	3× (yellow card) 2× (suspension)	Report	3× (yellow card) 3× (suspension)	Városi Sportcsarnok, Érd; Attendance: 350; Referees: Guzmán, Pérez (PUR)

== Final standings ==
Rank	Team
Gold medal	Denmark
Silver medal	Croatia
Bronze medal	Germany
4	Spain
5	Norway
6	Sweden
7	Serbia
8	Slovenia
9	Brazil
10	Hungary
11	Romania
12	Belarus
13	France
14	Egypt
15	Qatar
16	Austria
17	Japan
18	Argentina
19	Tunisia
20	Venezuela
21	South Korea
22	Angola
23	Gabon
24	Chile

== Awards ==
=== All-star team ===
- Goalkeeper: Sebastian Frandsen (DEN)
- Left wing: Lovro Mihić (CRO)
- Left back: Marko Mamić (CRO)
- Pivot: Ignacio Plaza Jiménez (ESP)
- Centre back: Tim Suton (GER)
- Right back: Niclas Kirkeløkke (DEN)
- Right wing: Sebastian Karlsson (SWE)

=== Other awards ===
- MVP: Simon Hald Jensen (DEN)
