= Handball at the 2024 Summer Olympics – Men's team rosters =

This article shows the rosters of all participating teams at the men's handball tournament at the 2024 Summer Olympics in Paris.

Each roster consisted of 15 players, where 14 can be chosen for each match. The players could be changed without restrictions.

Age, clubs, caps and goals as of the start of the tournament, 27 July 2024.

== Group A ==
=== Croatia ===
A 20-player roster was announced on 23 May 2024. The final squad was revealed on 7 July 2024.

Head coach: (Iceland) Dagur Sigurðsson

No.	Pos.	Name	Date of birth (age)	Height	App.	Goals	Club
1	GK	Dominik Kuzmanović	15 August 2002 (aged 21)	1.93 m	21	0	(Germany) VfL Gummersbach
2	LW	Lovro Mihić	25 August 1994 (age 30)	1.81 m	62	86	(Poland) Orlen Wisła Płock
5	CB	Domagoj Duvnjak	1 June 1988 (aged 36)	1.98 m	257	771	(Germany) THW Kiel
6	RW	Mario Šoštarič	25 November 1992 (aged 31)	1.93 m	20	70	(Hungary) OTP Bank-Pick Szeged
9	RB	Luka Lovre Klarica	25 September 2001 (aged 22)	1.97 m	26	66	(Croatia) RK Zagreb
11	LB	Zvonimir Srna	18 January 1998 (aged 26)	2.02 m	28	61	(Croatia) RK Zagreb
12	GK	Matej Mandić	2 May 2002 (aged 22)	2.06 m	24	0	(Croatia) RK Zagreb
17	LB	Josip Šarac	24 February 1998 (aged 26)	2.00 m	33	40	(Germany) Frisch Auf Göppingen
33	CB	Luka Cindrić	5 July 1993 (aged 31)	1.82 m	112	321	(Hungary) ONE Veszprém
40	P	Nikola Grahovac	14 December 1998 (aged 25)	2.01 m	15	8	(Hungary) ONE Veszprém
41	LB	Tin Lučin	16 August 1999 (aged 24)	1.97 m	32	82	(Croatia) Nexe Našice
51	RB	Ivan Martinović	6 January 1998 (aged 26)	1.94 m	44	197	(Germany) Rhein Neckar-Löwen
53	P	Marin Šipić	29 April 1996 (aged 28)	1.90 m	72	135	(Switzerland) HC Kriens-Luzern
93	P	Veron Načinović	7 March 2000 (aged 24)	2.04 m	31	69	(France) Montpellier Handball

=== Germany ===
A 17-player roster was announced on 10 June 2024. The final roster was revealed on 8 July 2024.

Head coach: (Iceland) Alfreð Gíslason

No.	Pos.	Name	Date of birth (age)	Height	App.	Goals	Club
1	GK	David Späth	29 April 2002 (aged 22)	2.00 m	20	0	(Germany) Rhein-Neckar Löwen
4	P	Johannes Golla	5 November 1997 (aged 26)	1.95 m	83	287	(Germany) SG Flensburg-Handewitt
7	CB	Luca Witzke	3 April 1999 (aged 25)	1.91 m	29	61	(Germany) SC DHfK Leipzig
11	LB	Sebastian Heymann	1 March 1998 (aged 26)	1.98 m	36	64	(Germany) Rhein-Neckar Löwen
14	P	Justus Fischer	6 February 2003 (aged 21)	1.94 m	14	11	(Germany) TSV Hannover-Burgdorf
15	CB	Juri Knorr	9 May 2000 (aged 24)	1.91 m	60	230	(Germany) Rhein-Neckar Löwen
18	LB	Julian Köster	16 March 2000 (aged 24)	2.00 m	50	119	(Germany) VfL Gummersbach
23	RB	Renārs Uščins	29 April 2002 (aged 22)	1.89 m	20	61	(Germany) TSV Hannover-Burgdorf
25	RB	Kai Häfner	10 July 1989 (aged 35)	1.92 m	146	349	(Germany) TVB Stuttgart
29	RW	Tim Hornke	4 August 1990 (aged 33)	1.88 m	22	57	(Germany) SC Magdeburg
33	GK	Andreas Wolff	3 March 1991 (aged 33)	1.98 m	161	14	(Germany) THW Kiel
34	LW	Rune Dahmke	10 April 1993 (aged 31)	1.89 m	74	111	(Germany) THW Kiel
36	LW	Lukas Mertens	22 March 1996 (aged 28)	1.82 m	47	108	(Germany) SC Magdeburg
44	RB	Christoph Steinert	18 January 1990 (aged 34)	1.96 m	48	87	(Germany) HC Erlangen
71	LB	Marko Grgić	11 September 2003 (aged 20)	1.98 m	4	8	(Germany) ThSV Eisenach
80	P	Jannik Kohlbacher	19 July 1995 (aged 29)	1.93 m	114	225	(Germany) Rhein-Neckar Löwen

=== Japan ===
A 19-player roster was announced on 7 June 2024. The final roster was revealed on 28 June 2024.

Head coach: (Spain) Antonio Carlos Ortega

No.	Pos.	Name	Date of birth (age)	Height	App.	Goals	Club
1	GK	Takumi Nakamura	2 August 1996 (aged 27)	1.90 m	34	1	(Japan) Toyoda Gosei Blue Falcon
2	CB	Kosuke Yasuhira	29 June 2000 (aged 24)	1.72 m	15	61	(North Macedonia) RK Vardar
4	RW	Tomoya Sakurai	18 October 1999 (aged 24)	1.90 m	0	0	(Japan) Toyota Auto Body Brave Kings
9	LW	Naoki Sugioka	18 April 1994 (aged 30)	1.77 m	67	129	(Japan) Toyota Auto Body Brave Kings
13	P	Shuichi Yoshida	26 March 2001 (aged 23)	1.93 m	39	84	(France) HBC Nantes
15	LB	Adam Yuki Baig	12 April 1999 (aged 25)	1.95 m	78	191	(Japan) Zeekstar Tokyo
19	RB	Shinnosuke Tokuda	6 December 1995 (aged 28)	1.78 m	92	297	(Saudi Arabia) Khaleej Club
20	RB	Jin Watanabe	17 January 1990 (aged 34)	1.83 m	125	393	(Japan) Toyota Auto Body Brave Kings
21	GK	Daisuke Okamoto	29 March 1995 (aged 29)	1.90 m	7	0	(Japan) Toyota Auto Body Brave Kings
25	RW	Hiroki Motoki	14 February 1992 (aged 32)	1.82 m	119	342	(Japan) Zeekstar Tokyo
27	P	Hiroyasu Tamakawa	27 April 1995 (aged 29)	2.00 m	86	80	(Japan) Zeekstar Tokyo
31	LB	Tatsuki Yoshino	13 July 1994 (aged 30)	1.83 m	75	267	(Japan) Toyota Auto Body Brave Kings
39	CB	Naoki Fujisaka	1 July 2002 (aged 22)	1.80 m	0	0	(Japan) Nippon Sport Science Univ.
44	LW	Sota Takano	19 August 1998 (aged 25)	1.93 m	30	22	(Japan) Toyota Auto Body Brave Kings

=== Slovenia ===
A 21-player roster was announced on 3 June 2024. The final squad was revealed on 8 July 2024.

Head coach: Uroš Zorman

No.	Pos.	Name	Date of birth (age)	Height	App.	Goals	Club
3	P	Blaž Blagotinšek	17 January 1994 (aged 30)	2.05 m	134	240	(Germany) SG Flensburg-Handewitt
5	LB	Nik Henigman	4 December 1995 (aged 28)	2.01 m	76	105	(France) Saint-Raphaël Var
8	RW	Blaž Janc	20 November 1996 (aged 27)	1.86 m	101	366	(Spain) Barça
11	RB	Jure Dolenec	6 December 1988 (aged 35)	1.90 m	195	686	(France) Limoges Handball
17	RB	Nejc Cehte	4 September 1992 (aged 31)	1.96 m	72	129	(North Macedonia) Eurofarm Pelister
19	LW	Staš Slatinek Jovičić	6 December 2000 (aged 23)	1.88 m	25	59	(Slovenia) RD Slovan
20	LW	Tilen Kodrin	14 May 1994 (aged 30)	1.91 m	85	146	(Germany) VfL Gummersbach
22	P	Matej Gaber	22 July 1991 (aged 33)	1.98 m	142	208	(France) HBC Nantes
23	CB	Miha Zarabec	12 October 1991 (aged 32)	1.78 m	104	222	(Poland) Orlen Wisła Płock
26	GK	Klemen Ferlin	26 June 1989 (aged 35)	1.90 m	73	2	(Germany) HC Erlangen
27	P	Kristjan Horžen	8 December 1999 (aged 24)	1.92 m	44	64	(Germany) VfL Gummersbach
44	CB	Dean Bombač	4 April 1989 (aged 35)	1.89 m	129	272	(Hungary) ETO-SZESE Győr FKC
51	LB	Borut Mačkovšek	11 September 1992 (aged 31)	2.03 m	144	379	(Hungary) OTP Bank-Pick Szeged
77	RW	Domen Novak	26 April 1998 (aged 26)	1.82 m	37	76	(Germany) HSG Wetzlar
88	CB	Aleks Vlah	22 July 1997 (aged 27)	1.92 m	44	155	(Denmark) Aalborg Håndbold
90	GK	Urban Lesjak	24 August 1990 (aged 33)	1.88 m	85	0	(Slovenia) RK Trimo Trebnje
99	GK	Urh Kastelic	27 February 1996 (aged 28)	2.02 m	56	7	(Germany) TBV Lemgo

=== Spain ===
A 21-player roster was announced on 10 June 2024. The final squad was revealed on 7 July 2024. On 18 July 2024, Jorge Maqueda replaced Joan Cañellas due to an injury.

Head coach: Jordi Ribera

No.	Pos.	Name	Date of birth (age)	Height	App.	Goals	Club
1	GK	Gonzalo Pérez de Vargas	10 January 1991 (aged 33)	1.90 m	179	18	(Spain) Barça
5	RB	Jorge Maqueda	6 February 1988 (aged 36)	1.95 m	202	497	(Poland) Industria Kielce
10	RB	Alex Dujshebaev	17 December 1992 (aged 31)	1.87 m	152	442	(Poland) Industria Kielce
12	GK	Rodrigo Corrales	24 January 1991 (aged 33)	2.02 m	128	4	(Hungary) Telekom Veszprém
17	P	Adrià Figueras	31 August 1988 (aged 35)	1.92 m	124	335	(France) C' Chartres Métropole
18	RB	Imanol Garciandia	30 April 1995 (aged 29)	2.02 m	50	131	(Hungary) OTP Bank-Pick Szeged
20	P	Abel Serdio	16 April 1994 (aged 30)	1.95 m	40	88	(Poland) Orlen Wisła Płock
25	LB	Agustín Casado	21 May 1996 (aged 28)	1.90 m	46	119	(Hungary) Telekom Veszprém
28	RW	Aleix Gómez	7 May 1997 (aged 27)	1.80 m	83	320	(Spain) Barça
36	CB	Ian Tarrafeta	4 January 1999 (aged 25)	1.88 m	45	101	(France) Pays d'Aix UC
51	LW	Miguel Sánchez-Migallón	8 February 1995 (aged 29)	2.00 m	45	30	(Portugal) SL Benfica
59	LB	Daniel Dujshebaev	4 July 1997 (aged 27)	1.97 m	86	186	(Poland) Industria Kielce
62	RW	Kauldi Odriozola	7 January 1997 (aged 27)	1.83 m	60	170	(France) HBC Nantes
70	LW	Daniel Fernández	28 March 2001 (aged 23)	1.76 m	35	113	(Germany) TVB Stuttgart
99	P	Javier Rodríguez Moreno	22 July 2002 (aged 22)	2.00 m	4	6	(Spain) Barça

=== Sweden ===
A 17-player roster was announced on 10 June 2024. On 21 June, Felix Möller replaced Andreas Nilsson who had to withdraw. The final roster was revealed on 24 July. On 28 July, Felix Möller replaced Max Darj due to an injury and on 1 August, Jonathan Edvardsson replaced Daniel Pettersson.

Head coach: (Norway) Glenn Solberg

No.	Pos.	Name	Date of birth (age)	Height	App.	Goals	Club
2	LB	Jonathan Carlsbogård	19 April 1995 (aged 29)	1.95 m	69	134	(Spain) Barça
5	P	Max Darj	27 September 1991 (aged 32)	1.92 m	121	145	(Germany) Füchse Berlin
6	P	Felix Möller	4 September 2002 (aged 21)	1.96 m	15	10	(Denmark) Aalborg Håndbold
11	RW	Daniel Pettersson	6 May 1992 (aged 32)	1.79 m	90	207	(Germany) SC Magdeburg
12	GK	Andreas Palicka	10 July 1986 (aged 38)	1.89 m	158	16	(France) Paris Saint-Germain
13	RW	Sebastian Karlsson	21 January 1995 (aged 29)	1.78 m	15	41	(France) Montpellier Handball
15	LW	Hampus Wanne	10 December 1993 (aged 30)	1.85 m	96	393	(Spain) Barça
16	GK	Tobias Thulin	5 July 1995 (aged 29)	1.98 m	60	0	(Hungary) SC Pick Szeged
19	CB	Felix Claar	5 January 1997 (aged 27)	1.93 m	74	196	(Germany) SC Magdeburg
22	LW	Lucas Pellas	28 August 1995 (aged 28)	1.83 m	71	226	(France) Montpellier Handball
23	RB	Albin Lagergren	11 September 1992 (aged 31)	1.86 m	110	324	(Germany) SC Magdeburg
24	CB	Jim Gottfridsson	2 September 1992 (aged 31)	1.91 m	155	495	(Germany) SG Flensburg-Handewitt
28	CB	Jonathan Edvardsson	7 April 1997 (aged 27)	1.90 m	22	8	(Germany) TSV Hannover-Burgdorf
32	P	Oscar Bergendahl	8 March 1995 (aged 29)	1.92 m	56	84	(Germany) SC Magdeburg
33	RB	Lukas Sandell	3 February 1997 (aged 27)	1.93 m	58	140	(Hungary) Telekom Veszprém
49	LB	Karl Wallinius	14 January 1999 (aged 25)	1.99 m	29	29	(Germany) THW Kiel

== Group B ==
=== Argentina ===
A 17-player roster was announced on 7 June 2024.

Head coach: Guillermo Milano

No.	Pos.	Name	Date of birth (age)	Height	App.	Goals	Club
2	LW	Federico Gastón Fernández	17 October 1989 (aged 34)	1.87 m	218	790	(Argentina) San Fernando
3	RB	Federico Pizarro	7 September 1986 (aged 37)	1.85 m	252	825	(Spain) BM Ciudad Encantada
4	CB	Nicolás Bono	16 August 1997 (aged 26)	1.79 m	24	43	(France) Istres Provence
6	CB	Diego Simonet	26 December 1989 (aged 34)	1.89 m	137	429	(France) Montpellier Handball
7	LW	Ignacio Pizarro	8 February 1990 (aged 34)	1.78 m	94	307	(Spain) BM Ciudad Encantada
8	CB	Pablo Simonet	4 May 1992 (aged 32)	1.85 m	150	332	(Spain) BM Puente Genil
11	P	Lucas Moscariello	19 February 1992 (aged 32)	1.90 m	106	223	(Spain) BM Benidorm
14	RB	Andrés Moyano	28 July 1996 (aged 27)	1.92 m	27	57	(Spain) BM Granollers
18	LB	Guillermo Fischer	18 July 1996 (aged 28)	2.00 m	57	51	(Spain) BM Villa de Aranda
19	CB	Pedro Martínez Cami	20 December 1999 (aged 24)	1.90 m	59	127	(Portugal) Benfica
22	P	Gastón Mouriño	12 October 1994 (aged 29)	1.92 m	69	118	(Romania) CSM Constanța
23	LB	James Parker	9 June 1994 (aged 30)	1.87 m	41	75	(Spain) Balonmano Alicante
40	GK	Leonel Maciel	4 January 1989 (aged 35)	1.92 m	131	17	(Spain) CD Bidasoa
77	LB	Nicolás Bonanno	18 November 1991 (aged 32)	1.98 m	93	67	(Spain) Club Balonmano Nava
87	GK	Juan Bar	29 June 1987 (aged 37)	1.90 m	85	5	(Spain) BM Valladolid

=== Denmark ===
A 20-player roster was announced on 10 June 2024. The final squad was announced on 3 July. On 9 July, Mads Hoxer Hangaard was replaced by Hans Lindberg. On 30 July, Simon Hald and Magnus Saugstrup were replaced by Lukas Jørgensen and Lasse Andersson.

Head coach: Nikolaj Jacobsen

No.	Pos.	Name	Date of birth (age)	Height	App.	Goals	Club
1	GK	Niklas Landin Jacobsen	19 December 1988 (aged 35)	2.01 m	275	12	(Denmark) Aalborg Håndbold
3	RB	Niclas Kirkeløkke	26 March 1994 (aged 30)	1.95 m	81	158	(Germany) SG Flensburg-Handewitt
4	LW	Magnus Landin Jacobsen	20 August 1995 (aged 28)	1.97 m	135	247	(Germany) THW Kiel
7	LW	Emil Jakobsen	24 January 1998 (aged 26)	1.90 m	72	247	(Germany) SG Flensburg-Handewitt
11	CB	Rasmus Lauge	20 June 1991 (aged 33)	1.96 m	167	247	(Denmark) Bjerringbro-Silkeborg
12	GK	Emil Nielsen	10 March 1997 (aged 27)	1.95 m	42	5	(Spain) Barça
15	P	Magnus Saugstrup	12 July 1996 (aged 28)	1.95 m	84	184	(Germany) SC Magdeburg
18	RW	Hans Lindberg	1 August 1981 (aged 42)	1.88 m	300	806	(Denmark) HØJ Elite
19	RB	Mathias Gidsel	8 February 1999 (aged 25)	1.90 m	70	376	(Germany) Füchse Berlin
21	LB	Henrik Møllgaard	2 January 1985 (aged 39)	1.97 m	218	182	(Denmark) Aalborg Håndbold
24	LB	Mikkel Hansen	22 October 1987 (aged 36)	1.92 m	268	1358	Not attached
25	P	Lukas Jørgensen	31 March 1999 (aged 25)	1.93 m	35	95	(Germany) SG Flensburg-Handewitt
28	LB	Lasse Andersson	11 March 1994 (aged 30)	1.96 m	69	77	(Germany) Füchse Berlin
34	P	Simon Hald	28 September 1994 (aged 29)	2.03 m	95	99	(Denmark) Aalborg Håndbold
42	OB	Thomas Sommer Arnoldsen	11 January 2002 (aged 22)	1.98 m	7	21	(Denmark) Aalborg Håndbold
43	LB	Simon Pytlick	11 December 2000 (aged 23)	1.93 m	37	148	(Germany) SG Flensburg-Handewitt

=== Egypt ===
A 20-player roster was announced on 13 June 2024. The final squad was revealed on 15 July 2024.

Head coach: (Spain) Juan Carlos Pastor

No.	Pos.	Name	Date of birth (age)	Height	App.	Goals	Club
5	RB	Yahia Omar	9 September 1997 (aged 26)	1.95 m	62	221	(France) Paris Saint-Germain
10	LB	Abdelrahman Abdou	30 January 1996 (aged 28)	1.96 m	15	25	(Egypt) Al Ahly
15	LB	Ahmed Hesham	15 May 2000 (aged 24)	1.91 m	58	77	(France) Montpellier Handball
21	P	Mohamed Tarek	15 January 2002 (aged 22)	2.02 m	0	0	(Egypt) Zamalek
24	P	Ibrahim El-Masry	11 March 1989 (aged 35)	1.96 m	62	81	(Egypt) Al Ahly
31	LW	Omar El-Wakil	14 May 1988 (aged 36)	1.74 m	224	302	(Egypt) Zamalek
39	CB	Yehia El-Deraa	17 July 1995 (aged 29)	1.92 m	162	319	(Hungary) Telekom Veszprém
45	CB	Seif El-Deraa	19 September 1998 (aged 25)	1.87 m	58	93	(France) Limoges Handball
48	RW	Mohab Abdelhak	20 January 2003 (aged 21)	1.94 m	35	65	(France) USAM Nîmes Gard
53	RW	Akram Yosri	22 November 1994 (aged 29)	1.80 m	53	147	(Egypt) Zamalek
80	P	Ahmed Adel	25 November 1994 (aged 29)	1.84 m	27	24	(Egypt) Al Ahly
88	GK	Karim Handawy	1 May 1988 (aged 36)	1.88 m	175	2	(Saudi Arabia) Al Safa
90	LB	Ali Zein	14 December 1990 (aged 33)	1.91 m	310	464	(Romania) Dinamo București
91	RW	Mohamed Sanad	16 January 1991 (aged 33)	1.88 m	171	418	(France) USAM Nîmes Gard
92	GK	Mohamed Aly	13 November 1992 (aged 31)	1.90 m	15	0	(Portugal) Benfica

=== France ===
A 21-player roster was announced on 10 June 2024. The final squad was named on 8 July 2024.

Head coach: Guillaume Gille

No.	Pos.	Name	Date of birth (age)	Height	App.	Goals	Club
2	RW	Yanis Lenne	29 June 1996 (aged 28)	1.88 m	56	111	(France) Montpellier Handball
4	CB	Aymeric Minne	18 July 1995 (aged 29)	1.95 m	127	389	(Hungary) Telekom Veszprém
5	CB	Nedim Remili	18 July 1995 (aged 29)	1.95 m	127	389	(Hungary) Telekom Veszprém
8	LB	Elohim Prandi	24 August 1998 (aged 25)	1.93 m	39	94	(France) Paris Saint-Germain
9	RB	Melvyn Richardson	31 January 1997 (aged 27)	1.90 m	87	208	(Spain) Barça
10	RB	Dika Mem	31 August 1997 (aged 26)	1.94 m	117	399	(Spain) Barça
11	P	Nicolas Tournat	5 April 1994 (aged 30)	2.00 m	96	219	(France) HBC Nantes
12	GK	Vincent Gérard	16 December 1986 (aged 37)	1.89 m	152	18	(France) Istres Provence
13	LB	Nikola Karabatić	11 April 1984 (aged 40)	1.96 m	357	1294	Not attached
22	P	Luka Karabatić	19 April 1988 (aged 36)	2.02 m	154	174	(France) Paris Saint-Germain
23	P	Ludovic Fabregas	1 July 1996 (aged 28)	1.98 m	141	344	(Hungary) Telekom Veszprém
25	LW	Hugo Descat	16 August 1992 (aged 31)	1.83 m	58	244	(Hungary) Telekom Veszprém
28	RW	Valentin Porte	7 September 1990 (aged 33)	1.90 m	190	425	(France) Montpellier Handball
31	LW	Dylan Nahi	30 November 1999 (aged 24)	1.92 m	57	155	(Poland) Industria Kielce
34	P	Karl Konan	3 June 1995 (aged 29)	1.96 m	34	6	(France) Montpellier Handball
92	GK	Rémi Desbonnet	28 February 1992 (aged 32)	1.82 m	40	4	(France) Montpellier Handball

=== Hungary ===
A 20-player roster was announced on 4 June 2024. The final squad was announced on 5 July 2024.

Head coach: (Spain) Chema Rodríguez

No.	Pos.	Name	Date of birth (age)	Height	App.	Goals	Club
2	P	Adrián Sipos	8 March 1990 (aged 34)	1.98 m	82	37	(Germany) MT Melsungen
7	LW	Bendegúz Bóka	2 October 1993 (aged 30)	1.95 m	86	207	(Hungary) Balatonfüredi KSE
11	LB	Patrik Ligetvári	13 February 1996 (aged 28)	2.03 m	101	88	(Hungary) Telekom Veszprém
16	GK	Roland Mikler	20 September 1984 (aged 39)	1.92 m	245	1	(Hungary) OTP Bank-Pick Szeged
24	CB	Gergő Fazekas	31 October 2003 (aged 20)	1.90 m	27	43	(Poland) Wisła Płock
26	RW	Pedro Rodríguez Álvarez	22 August 1990 (aged 33)	1.97 m	40	104	(Hungary) MOL-Tatabánya KC
27	P	Bence Bánhidi	9 February 1995 (aged 29)	2.06 m	113	347	(Hungary) OTP Bank-Pick Szeged
30	LB	Zoltán Szita	10 February 1998 (aged 26)	1.96 m	75	171	(Poland) Wisła Płock
32	GK	Kristóf Palasics	19 April 2002 (aged 22)	1.99 m	15	0	(Spain) BM Logroño La Rioja
33	RB	Gábor Ancsin	27 November 1990 (aged 33)	2.02 m	161	360	(Hungary) Ferencvárosi TC
39	LB	Richárd Bodó	13 March 1993 (aged 31)	2.03 m	112	330	(Hungary) OTP Bank-Pick Szeged
43	RB	Zoran Ilić	2 January 2002 (aged 22)	1.97 m	34	42	(Germany) HSV Hamburg
45	P	Miklós Rosta	14 February 1999 (aged 25)	2.03 m	65	178	(Romania) CS Dinamo București
61	GK	László Bartucz	5 November 1991 (aged 32)	1.94 m	29	0	(Hungary) MOL-Tatabánya KC
66	CB	Máté Lékai	16 June 1988 (aged 36)	1.90 m	182	548	(Hungary) Ferencvárosi TC
77	CB	Egon Hanusz	25 September 1997 (aged 26)	1.77 m	52	78	(Portugal) Benfica
91	RW	Bence Imre	15 October 2002 (aged 21)	1.86 m	17	76	(Germany) THW Kiel

=== Norway ===
The squad was announced on 3 July 2024.

Head coach: Jonas Wille

No.	Pos.	Name	Date of birth (age)	Height	App.	Goals	Club
3	DF	Vetle Eck Aga	4 October 1993 (aged 30)	1.90 m	51	4	(Norway) Kolstad Håndball
5	CB	Sander Sagosen	14 September 1995 (aged 28)	1.95 m	168	839	(Norway) Kolstad Håndball
6	LW	Sebastian Barthold	27 August 1991 (aged 32)	1.85 m	85	229	(Denmark) Aalborg Håndbold
11	P	Petter Øverby	26 March 1992 (aged 32)	2.00 m	138	144	(Germany) THW Kiel
12	GK	Kristian Sæverås	22 June 1996 (aged 28)	1.95 m	88	3	(Germany) SC DHfK Leipzig
19	RW	Kristian Bjørnsen	10 January 1989 (aged 35)	1.91 m	198	714	(Denmark) Aalborg Håndbold
21	P	Magnus Gullerud	13 November 1991 (aged 32)	1.94 m	191	291	(Norway) Kolstad Håndball
22	CB	Tobias Grøndahl	22 January 2001 (aged 23)	1.84 m	35	84	(Denmark) GOG Håndbold
24	CB	Christian O'Sullivan	22 August 1991 (aged 32)	1.90 m	192	295	(Germany) SC Magdeburg
27	RB	Harald Reinkind	17 August 1992 (aged 31)	1.97 m	169	363	(Germany) THW Kiel
30	GK	Torbjørn Bergerud	16 July 1994 (aged 30)	2.00 m	144	0	(Norway) Kolstad Håndball
42	RB	Gabriel Setterblom	22 November 1997 (aged 26)	1.92 m	10	16	(Denmark) SønderjyskE
43	LB	Simen Lyse	1 February 2000 (aged 24)	1.95 m	18	44	(Norway) Kolstad Håndball
71	LW	Alexander Blonz	17 April 2000 (aged 24)	1.89 m	86	221	(Denmark) GOG Håndbold

== See also ==
- Handball at the 2024 Summer Olympics – Women's team rosters
