= Nemanja Mladenović =

Nemanja Mladenović may refer to:

- Nemanja Mladenović (footballer, born 1993), Serbian association football midfielder, who plays for Zemun
- Nemanja Mladenović (footballer, born 1996), Serbian association football centre-back
- Nemanja Mladenović (handballer) (born 1994), Serbian handball player
