= Neuhold =

Neuhold is a surname. Notable people with the surname include:

- Alois Neuhold (born 1951), Austrian painter
- Christoph Neuhold (born 1994), Austrian handball player
- Florian Neuhold (born 1993), Austrian footballer
- Günter Neuhold (born 1947), Austrian conductor
