= Handball at the 2024 Summer Olympics – Women's team rosters =

This article shows the rosters of all participating teams at the women's handball tournament at the 2024 Summer Olympics in Paris.

Each roster consisted of 15 players, where 14 could be chosen for each match. The players could be changed without restrictions.

Age, clubs, caps and goals as of the start of the tournament, 25 July 2024.

== Group A ==
=== Denmark ===
The squad was announced on 6 June 2024. On 24 July, Helena Elver replaced Simone Petersen due to an injury. On 2 August, Michala Møller replaced Louise Burgaard.

Head coach: Jesper Jensen

No.	Pos.	Name	Date of birth (age)	Height	App.	Goals	Club
1	GK	Sandra Toft	18 October 1989 (aged 34)	1.76 m	182	2	(Hungary) Győri ETO KC
5	P	Sarah Iversen	10 April 1990 (aged 34)	1.77 m	90	148	(Denmark) Ikast Håndbold
6	CB	Helena Elver	1 March 1998 (aged 26)	1.75 m	22	28	(Denmark) Odense Håndbold
8	LB	Anne Mette Hansen	25 August 1994 (aged 29)	1.82 m	163	475	(France) Metz Handball
10	P	Kathrine Heindahl	26 March 1992 (aged 32)	1.82 m	137	277	(Denmark) Team Esbjerg
11	LB	Line Haugsted	11 November 1994 (aged 29)	1.80 m	100	132	(Denmark) Team Esbjerg
16	GK	Althea Reinhardt	1 September 1996 (aged 27)	1.80 m	112	0	(Denmark) Odense Håndbold
18	RB	Mette Tranborg	1 January 1996 (aged 28)	1.92 m	110	261	(Denmark) Team Esbjerg
23	LB	Kristina Jørgensen	17 January 1998 (aged 26)	1.87 m	112	331	(Hungary) Győri ETO KC
25	RW	Trine Østergaard	17 October 1991 (aged 32)	1.66 m	184	368	(Romania) CSM București
27	RB	Louise Burgaard	17 October 1992 (aged 31)	1.76 m	176	368	(Denmark) Odense Håndbold
32	LB	Mie Højlund	24 October 1997 (aged 26)	1.80 m	100	193	(Denmark) Odense Håndbold
33	LW	Emma Friis	31 October 1999 (aged 24)	1.62 m	59	176	(Romania) CSM București
34	P	Rikke Iversen	18 May 1993 (aged 31)	1.78 m	79	120	(Denmark) Team Esbjerg
42	LB	Michala Møller	16 February 2000 (aged 24)	1.78 m	27	27	(Denmark) Team Esbjerg

=== Germany ===
A 21-player squad was announced on 17 May 2024. The final roster was revealed on 8 July 2024.

Head coach: Markus Gaugisch

No.	Pos.	Name	Date of birth (age)	Height	App.	Goals	Club
4	CB	Alina Grijseels	12 April 1996 (aged 28)	1.75 m	88	295	(Romania) CSM București
7	P	Meike Schmelzer	19 July 1993 (aged 31)	1.79 m	111	145	(Romania) HC Dunărea Brăila
9	P	Lisa Antl	21 June 2000 (aged 24)	1.73 m	52	75	(Germany) Borussia Dortmund
11	LB	Xenia Smits	22 April 1994 (aged 30)	1.85 m	120	283	(Germany) HB Ludwigsburg
20	LB	Emily Bölk	26 April 1998 (aged 26)	1.82 m	115	347	(Hungary) Ferencvárosi TC
23	LB	Annika Lott	7 December 1999 (aged 24)	1.80 m	28	47	(France) Brest Bretagne Handball
24	GK	Sarah Wachter	16 December 1999 (aged 24)	1.82 m	27	1	(Germany) Borussia Dortmund
27	RB	Julia Maidhof	13 March 1998 (aged 26)	1.76 m	54	183	(Romania) Râmnicu Vâlcea
29	LW	Antje Döll	3 October 1988 (aged 35)	1.70 m	81	214	(Germany) HB Ludwigsburg
30	RW	Jenny Behrend	20 January 1996 (aged 28)	1.70 m	60	102	(Germany) HB Ludwigsburg
42	GK	Katharina Filter	4 February 1999 (aged 25)	1.80 m	52	2	(France) Brest Bretagne Handball
77	RB	Viola Leuchter	15 June 2004 (aged 20)	1.87 m	19	48	(Germany) HB Ludwigsburg
93	P	Julia Behnke	28 March 1993 (aged 31)	1.80 m	108	200	(Germany) TuS Metzingen
95	LW	Johanna Stockschläder	11 February 1995 (aged 29)	1.67 m	53	143	Unattached

=== Norway ===
A 15-player squad was announced on 3 July 2024. The final roster was revealed on 24 July. On 29 July, Henny Reistad replaced Thale Rushfeldt Deila and on 31 July, Thale Rushfeldt Deila replaced Nora Mørk.

Head coach: (Iceland) Þórir Hergeirsson

No.	Pos.	Name	Date of birth (age)	Height	App.	Goals	Club
4	LB	Veronica Kristiansen	10 July 1990 (aged 34)	1.75 m	179	573	(Hungary) Győri ETO KC
6	P	Maren Nyland Aardahl	2 March 1994 (aged 30)	1.83 m	52	94	(Denmark) Odense Håndbold
7	RB	Stine Skogrand	3 March 1993 (aged 31)	1.73 m	146	273	(Denmark) Ikast Håndbold
9	RB	Nora Mørk	5 April 1991 (aged 33)	1.69 m	185	893	(Denmark) Team Esbjerg
10	CB	Stine Bredal Oftedal	25 September 1991 (aged 32)	1.68 m	261	732	Unattached
12	GK	Silje Solberg-Østhassel	16 June 1990 (aged 34)	1.78 m	206	9	(Norway) Vipers Kristiansand
13	P	Kari Brattset Dale	15 February 1991 (aged 33)	1.84 m	124	316	(Hungary) Győri ETO KC
14	LB	Kristine Breistøl	23 August 1993 (aged 30)	1.91 m	80	120	(Hungary) Győri ETO KC
15	P	Vilde Ingstad	18 December 1994 (aged 29)	1.80 m	132	202	(Romania) CSM București
16	GK	Katrine Lunde	30 March 1980 (aged 44)	1.81 m	355	3	(Norway) Vipers Kristiansand
20	RW	Marit Røsberg Jacobsen	25 February 1994 (aged 30)	1.65 m	105	185	(Denmark) Team Esbjerg
23	LW	Camilla Herrem	8 October 1986 (aged 37)	1.67 m	310	901	(Norway) Sola HK
24	LW	Sanna Solberg-Isaksen	16 June 1990 (aged 34)	1.78 m	205	389	(Denmark) Team Esbjerg
25	CB	Henny Reistad	9 February 1999 (aged 25)	1.81 m	84	344	(Denmark) Team Esbjerg
33	LB	Thale Rushfeldt Deila	15 January 2000 (aged 24)	1.78 m	40	71	(Denmark) Odense Håndbold

=== Slovenia ===
A 20-player squad was announced on 3 June 2024. The final roster was revealed on 8 July 2024.

Head coach: (Montenegro) Dragan Adžić

No.	Pos.	Name	Date of birth (age)	Height	App.	Goals	Club
2	P	Valentina Klemenčič	5 February 2002 (aged 22)	1.85 m	45	57	(Slovenia) RK Krim
6	RB	Ana Gros	21 January 1991 (aged 33)	1.86 m	151	759	(Slovenia) RK Krim
7	CB	Elizabeth Omoregie	29 December 1996 (aged 27)	1.77 m	33	72	(Romania) CSM București
9	CB	Nina Spreitzer	4 March 1998 (aged 26)	1.77 m	67	32	(Slovenia) RK Krim
10	LB	Tjaša Stanko	5 November 1997 (aged 26)	1.73 m	105	440	(Slovenia) RK Krim
11	LB	Ana Abina	30 July 1997 (aged 26)	1.78 m	73	83	(Slovenia) ŽRK Ajdovščina
14	LW	Tamara Mavsar	1 April 1991 (aged 33)	1.73 m	102	388	(Slovenia) RK Krim
16	GK	Maja Vojnovič	26 January 1998 (aged 26)	1.80 m	73	1	(Slovenia) RK Krim
17	P	Nataša Ljepoja	28 January 1996 (aged 28)	1.79 m	73	147	(Romania) SCM Râmnicu Vâlcea
20	RW	Alja Varagić	11 December 1990 (aged 33)	1.85 m	99	229	(Slovenia) RK Krim
21	GK	Amra Pandžić	20 September 1989 (aged 34)	1.78 m	101	2	(Slovenia) RK Krim
25	RB	Barbara Lazović	4 January 1988 (aged 36)	1.83 m	105	321	(Slovenia) RK Krim
28	LW	Maja Svetik	9 March 1996 (aged 28)	1.68 m	60	68	(Austria) BT Füchse
35	LB	Ema Hrvatin	4 January 2000 (aged 24)	1.78 m	23	29	(France) Saint-Amand
88	LW	Ema Abina	18 February 1999 (aged 25)	1.71 m	32	36	(Slovenia) RK Krim

=== South Korea ===
A 22-player squad was announced on 14 May 2024. It was reduced to 17 players on 2 July 2024.

Head coach: (Sweden) Henrik Signell

No.	Pos.	Name	Date of birth (age)	Height	App.	Goals	Club
2	RW	Song Ji-young	5 May 1995 (aged 29)	1.64 m	29	55	(South Korea) Seoul City
7	LW	Shin Eun-joo	9 September 1993 (aged 30)	1.70 m	56	106	(South Korea) Incheon City
11	RB	Ryu Eun-hee	24 February 1990 (aged 34)	1.79 m	171	524	(Hungary) Győri ETO KC
12	GK	Jeong Jin-hui	24 March 1999 (aged 25)	1.80 m	33	0	(South Korea) Seoul City
16	GK	Park Sae-young	11 August 1994 (aged 29)	1.76 m	67	0	(South Korea) Wonderful Samcheok
18	LB	Han Mi-seul	13 August 1993 (aged 30)	1.78 m	48	79	(South Korea) Incheon City
19	P	Kang Eun-hye	17 April 1996 (aged 28)	1.86 m	65	90	(South Korea) SK Sugar Gliders
23	LB	Woo Bit-na	23 October 2001 (aged 22)	1.72 m	10	36	(South Korea) Seoul City
24	CB	Kang Kyung-min	8 November 1996 (aged 27)	1.65 m	19	42	(South Korea) SK Sugar Gliders
26	RB	Kang Eun-seo	4 March 1999 (aged 25)	1.69 m	6	1	(South Korea) Incheon City
27	RW	Jeon Ji-yeon	2 May 2003 (aged 21)	1.68 m	5	5	(South Korea) Wonderful Samcheok
29	LB	Kim Da-young	16 September 1996 (aged 27)	1.70 m	0	0	(South Korea) Busan
31	P	Gim Bo-eun	8 December 1997 (aged 26)	1.77 m	32	68	(South Korea) Wonderful Samcheok
33	CB	Shin Jin-mi	23 June 1998 (aged 26)	1.67 m	6	9	(South Korea) Busan

=== Sweden ===
The squad was announced on 4 June 2024. On 26 July, Olivia Löfqvist replaced Sofia Hvenfelt due to an injury.

Head coach: Tomas Axnér

No.	Pos.	Name	Date of birth (age)	Height	App.	Goals	Club
1	GK	Johanna Bundsen	3 June 1991 (aged 33)	1.85 m	146	4	(Germany) HB Ludwigsburg
3	RB	Nina Koppang	31 May 2002 (aged 22)	1.78 m	30	41	(Norway) Vipers Kristiansand
6	CB	Carin Strömberg	10 July 1993 (aged 31)	1.84 m	147	221	(France) Neptunes de Nantes
7	P	Linn Blohm	20 May 1992 (aged 32)	1.80 m	167	490	(Hungary) Győri ETO KC
8	LB	Jamina Roberts	28 May 1990 (aged 34)	1.76 m	234	604	(Norway) Vipers Kristiansand
10	RW	Mathilda Lundström	20 December 1996 (aged 27)	1.65 m	80	124	(Denmark) HH Elite
21	GK	Evelina Eriksson	20 August 1996 (aged 27)	1.84 m	33	1	(Romania) CSM București
23	CB	Emma Lindqvist	17 September 1997 (aged 26)	1.77 m	89	182	(Denmark) Ikast Håndbold
24	RW	Nathalie Hagman	19 July 1991 (aged 33)	1.67 m	222	820	(Romania) SCM Râmnicu Vâlcea
29	LB	Kristin Thorleifsdóttir	13 January 1998 (aged 26)	1.82 m	61	87	(Hungary) Debreceni VSC
35	P	Sofia Hvenfelt	23 April 1996 (aged 28)	1.80 m	29	36	(Germany) HB Ludwigsburg
38	LW	Elin Hansson	7 August 1996 (aged 27)	1.73 m	75	188	(Denmark) Team Esbjerg
42	CB	Jenny Carlson	17 April 1995 (aged 29)	1.72 m	62	175	(Germany) HB Ludwigsburg
49	P	Olivia Löfqvist	13 July 1998 (aged 26)	1.77 m	10	7	(Norway) Storhamar HE
54	LB	Tyra Axnér	18 March 2002 (aged 22)	1.78 m	35	57	(France) Metz Handball

== Group B ==
=== Angola ===
An 18-player squad was announced on 17 June 2024. It was reduced to 15 players on 7 July 2024.

Head coach: (Spain) Carlos Viver

No.	Pos.	Name	Date of birth (age)	Height	App.	Goals	Club
1	GK	Marta Alberto	10 February 1995 (aged 29)	1.82 m	22	1	(Angola) Petro de Luanda
2	LB	Vilma Nenganga	12 September 1996 (aged 27)	1.77 m	14	22	(Angola) Petro de Luanda
5	P	Liliane Mario	16 November 2004 (aged 19)	1.77 m	20	57	(Angola) Primeiro de Agosto
6	RB	Juliana Machado	6 November 1994 (aged 29)	1.72 m	74	137	(Angola) Primeiro de Agosto
7	RW	Dolores Rosário	1 April 2003 (aged 21)	1.76 m	20	32	(Angola) Primeiro de Agosto
8	CB	Helena Paulo	24 January 1998 (aged 26)	1.73 m	48	184	(Romania) Târgu Jiu
9	LW	Natália Santos	25 December 1986 (aged 37)	1.73 m	289	230	(Angola) Primeiro de Agosto
10	P	Albertina Kassoma	12 June 1996 (aged 28)	1.85 m	86	243	(Romania) Rapid București
11	LW	Marília Quizelete	3 June 1997 (aged 27)	1.73 m	23	45	(Angola) Petro de Luanda
13	RW	Natália Kamalandua Fonseca	25 December 1998 (aged 25)	1.64 m	30	85	(Romania) CSM Corona Brașov
18	CB	Chelcia Gabriel	24 September 2000 (aged 23)	1.70 m	11	25	(Angola) Petro de Luanda
20	LB	Stelvia Pascoal	20 October 2002 (aged 21)	1.72 m	29	32	(France) Saint-Amand Handball
30	GK	Eliane Paulo	9 March 1999 (aged 25)	1.81 m	7	0	(Romania) Târgu Jiu
35	RB	Azenaide Carlos	14 June 1990 (aged 34)	1.73 m	96	116	(Romania) CSM Corona Brașov

=== Brazil ===
A 21-player squad was announced on 14 June 2024. The final squad was revealed on 4 July 2024.

Head coach: Cristiano Rocha

No.	Pos.	Name	Date of birth (age)	Height	App.	Goals	Club
1	GK	Gabriela Moreschi	8 July 1994 (aged 30)	1.90 m	79	0	(Romania) CSM București
2	LB	Bruna de Paula	26 September 1996 (aged 27)	1.70 m	102	332	(Hungary) Győri ETO KC
6	LB	Mariane Fernándes	4 January 1996 (aged 28)	1.65 m	49	113	(Poland) Zagłębie Lubin
7	P	Tamires Morena Lima	16 May 1994 (aged 30)	1.83 m	157	260	(Romania) Gloria Bistrița-Năsăud
10	RW	Jéssica Quintino	17 April 1991 (aged 33)	1.72 m	145	396	(Romania) Minaur Baia Mare
14	LW	Ana Cláudia Bolzan	15 July 1996 (aged 28)	1.77 m	29	49	(Portugal) Benfica
20	LW	Larissa Araújo	1 July 1992 (aged 32)	1.67 m	107	230	(Romania) CSM Corona Brașov
21	RW	Adriana Cardoso de Castro	29 October 1990 (aged 33)	1.67 m	85	360	Unknown
22	LB	Samara Vieira	7 October 1991 (aged 32)	1.83 m	49	85	(Turkey) Konyaaltı Bld. SK
23	RB	Giulia Guarieiro	24 July 1995 (aged 29)	1.74 m	55	84	(Spain) BM Granollers
30	RB	Gabriela Bitolo	1 April 1999 (aged 25)	1.80 m	27	35	(Spain) CBF Málaga Costa del Sol
36	P	Marcela Arounian	7 January 2000 (aged 24)	1.89 m	31	43	(Spain) BM Aula Cultural
42	CB	Jhennifer Lopes	28 July 2000 (aged 23)	1.76 m	26	15	(Spain) BM Remudas
49	CB	Patrícia Matieli	8 November 1988 (aged 35)	1.68 m	100	144	(Poland) Zagłębie Lubin
77	LB	Kelly Rosa	25 January 2004 (aged 20)	1.80 m	10	24	(Spain) CB Elche
87	GK	Renata Arruda	18 February 1999 (aged 25)	1.78 m	59	7	(Romania) Gloria Bistrița-Năsăud

=== France ===
A 21-player squad was announced on 17 May 2024. The final squad was announced on 8 July 2024. On 29 July, Grâce Zaadi and Cléopatre Darleux replaced Méline Nocandy and Hatadou Sako and on 31 July, Oriane Ondono replaced Sarah Bouktit.

Head coach: Olivier Krumbholz

No.	Pos.	Name	Date of birth (age)	Height	App.	Goals	Club
1	GK	Laura Glauser	20 August 1993 (aged 30)	1.80 m	124	1	(Hungary) Ferencvárosi TC
2	CB	Méline Nocandy	25 February 1998 (aged 26)	1.73 m	74	143	(France) Brest Bretagne Handball
3	RW	Alicia Toublanc	3 May 1996 (aged 28)	1.69 m	50	156	(Romania) SCM Râmnicu Vâlcea
6	LW	Chloé Valentini	19 April 1995 (aged 29)	1.65 m	90	258	(France) Metz Handball
8	LW	Coralie Lassource	1 September 1992 (aged 31)	1.67 m	92	164	(France) Brest Bretagne Handball
10	CB	Grâce Zaadi	7 July 1993 (aged 31)	1.71 m	184	364	(Romania) CSM București
16	GK	Cléopatre Darleux	1 July 1989 (aged 34)	1.76 m	200	5	Unknown
20	RB	Laura Flippes	13 December 1994 (aged 29)	1.71 m	133	265	(France) Metz Handball
21	LB	Orlane Kanor	16 June 1997 (aged 27)	1.74 m	90	189	(Hungary) Ferencvárosi TC
22	CB	Tamara Horacek	5 November 1995 (aged 28)	1.78 m	87	161	(Slovenia) RK Krim
26	P	Pauletta Foppa	22 December 2000 (aged 23)	1.77 m	88	224	(France) Brest Bretagne Handball
27	LB	Estelle Nze Minko	11 August 1991 (aged 32)	1.78 m	187	454	(Hungary) Győri ETO KC
29	P	Oriane Ondono	14 April 1996 (aged 28)	1.80 m	29	31	(France) Brest Bretagne Handball
31	RW	Lucie Granier	11 May 1999 (aged 25)	1.67 m	46	101	(France) Metz Handball
32	P	Sarah Bouktit	27 August 2002 (aged 21)	1.79 m	26	54	(France) Metz Handball
34	CB	Léna Grandveau	21 January 2003 (aged 21)	1.70 m	25	43	(France) Neptunes de Nantes
99	GK	Hatadou Sako	21 October 1995 (aged 28)	1.74 m	21	0	(Hungary) Győri ETO KC

=== Hungary ===
The squad was announced on 5 July 2024.

Head coach: Vladimir Golovin

No.	Pos.	Name	Date of birth (age)	Height	App.	Goals	Club
4	P	Petra Füzi-Tóvizi	15 March 1999 (aged 25)	1.78 m	73	85	(Hungary) Debreceni VSC
6	LW	Nadine Szöllősi-Schatzl	19 November 1993 (aged 30)	1.74 m	113	275	(Hungary) Moyra-Budaörs Handball
11	RB	Anna Albek	2 December 2001 (aged 22)	1.89 m	28	31	(Hungary) Mosonmagyaróvári KC SE
15	LB	Kinga Debreczeni-Klivinyi	31 March 1992 (aged 32)	1.75 m	89	186	(Hungary) Moyra-Budaörs Handball
16	GK	Blanka Böde-Bíró	22 September 1994 (aged 29)	1.87 m	116	3	(Hungary) Ferencvárosi TC
19	LW	Gréta Márton	3 October 1999 (aged 24)	1.73 m	78	181	(Hungary) Ferencvárosi TC
28	RB	Nikolett Papp	23 July 1996 (aged 28)	1.82 m	45	58	(Romania) SCM Gloria Buzău
31	GK	Zsófi Szemerey	2 June 1994 (aged 30)	1.83 m	22	0	(France) Metz Handball
32	P	Noémi Pásztor	2 April 1999 (aged 25)	1.78 m	35	33	(France) Neptunes de Nantes
38	CB	Petra Vámos	14 September 2000 (aged 23)	1.75 m	67	168	(France) Metz Handball
42	RB	Katrin Klujber	21 April 1999 (aged 25)	1.70 m	76	405	(Hungary) Ferencvárosi TC
44	LB	Gréta Kácsor	24 April 2000 (aged 24)	1.75 m	39	61	(Romania) Gloria Bistrița-Năsăud
58	P	Réka Bordás	26 August 1997 (aged 26)	1.85 m	54	53	(Hungary) Ferencvárosi TC
59	LB	Csenge Kuczora	26 January 2000 (aged 24)	1.76 m	36	117	(Germany) Thüringer HC
61	GK	Kinga Janurik	6 November 1991 (aged 32)	1.76 m	63	1	(Hungary) Ferencvárosi TC
66	RW	Viktória Győri-Lukács	31 October 1995 (aged 28)	1.68 m	119	342	(Hungary) Győri Audi ETO KC
77	CB	Petra Simon	12 November 2004 (aged 19)	1.68 m	17	45	(Hungary) Ferencvárosi TC

=== Netherlands ===
The squad was announced on 8 July 2024. On 20 July, Zoë Sprengers was replaced by Judith van der Helm due to an injury.

Head coach: (Sweden) Per Johansson

No.	Pos.	Name	Date of birth (age)	Height	App.	Goals	Club
6	RB	Laura van der Heijden	27 June 1990 (aged 34)	1.73 m	280	850	(France) Chambray Touraine Handball
8	LB	Lois Abbingh	13 August 1992 (aged 31)	1.78 m	205	857	(Norway) Vipers Kristiansand
9	CB	Larissa Nüsser	8 February 2000 (aged 24)	1.75 m	71	124	(Norway) Vipers Kristiansand
12	LW	Bo van Wetering	5 October 1999 (aged 24)	1.71 m	76	292	(Hungary) Győri ETO KC
14	LB	Judith van der Helm	13 January 2005 (aged 19)	1.82 m	3	1	(Netherlands) OTTO Work Force/VOC Amsterdam
16	P	Tamara Haggerty	29 April 1996 (aged 28)	1.78 m	32	22	(Hungary) DVSC Schaeffler
17	LB	Kim Molenaar	28 April 2002 (aged 22)	1.78 m	26	21	(Denmark) København Håndbold
18	LB	Kelly Dulfer	21 March 1994 (aged 30)	1.85 m	185	308	(Hungary) Győri ETO KC
26	RW	Angela Malestein	31 January 1993 (aged 31)	1.73 m	208	629	(Hungary) Ferencvárosi TC
30	GK	Rinka Duijndam	6 August 1997 (aged 26)	1.78 m	85	1	(Romania) CS Rapid București
38	GK	Yara ten Holte	23 November 1999 (aged 24)	1.75 m	50	4	(Denmark) Odense Håndbold
44	P	Nikita van der Vliet	14 March 2000 (aged 24)	1.73 m	48	82	(Denmark) Odense Håndbold
48	RB	Dione Housheer	26 September 1999 (aged 24)	1.80 m	88	257	(Hungary) Győri ETO KC
79	CB	Estavana Polman	5 August 1992 (aged 31)	1.74 m	182	621	(Romania) CS Rapid București

=== Spain ===
A 20-player squad was announced on 4 June 2024. The final roster was revealed on 11 July 2024. Carmen Campos replaced Alicia Fernández due to an injury on 24 July 2024.

Head coach: Ambros Martín

No.	Pos.	Name	Date of birth (age)	Height	App.	Goals	Club
1	GK	Nicole Wiggins	9 August 2000 (aged 23)	1.78 m	22	1	(France) OGC Nice
2	RW	Marta López	4 February 1990 (aged 34)	1.68 m	143	316	(Romania) CS Rapid București
6	CB	Carmen Campos	10 July 1995 (aged 29)	1.71 m	69	154	(Germany) Borussia Dortmund
8	CB	Silvia Arderíus	11 July 1990 (aged 34)	1.68 m	95	111	(Spain) CBF Málaga
15	RW	Maitane Etxeberria	15 January 1997 (aged 27)	1.68 m	92	166	(Spain) BM Bera Bera
16	GK	Mercedes Castellanos	21 July 1988 (aged 36)	1.84 m	98	4	(Spain) CBF Málaga
17	LW	Jennifer Gutiérrez	20 February 1995 (aged 29)	1.69 m	102	264	(Slovenia) RK Krim
22	LB	Lara González Ortega	22 February 1992 (aged 32)	1.84 m	176	183	(Romania) CS Rapid București
23	RB	Paula Arcos	21 December 2001 (aged 22)	1.72 m	56	135	(Norway) Vipers Kristiansand
24	P	Lysa Tchaptchet	20 December 2001 (aged 22)	1.83 m	48	62	(Denmark) Odense Håndbold
33	P	Kaba Gassama	16 August 1997 (aged 26)	1.84 m	68	104	(Germany) HB Ludwigsburg
34	CB	Alicia Fernández	21 December 1992 (aged 31)	1.72 m	101	227	(Romania) CS Rapid București
58	RB	María Prieto O'Mullony	3 October 1997 (aged 26)	1.72 m	25	64	(Spain) BM Aula Cultural
86	LB	Alexandrina Cabral	5 May 1986 (aged 38)	1.75 m	163	741	Unattached
99	RB	Mireya González	18 July 1991 (aged 33)	1.78 m	121	246	(Romania) HC Dunărea Brăila

== See also ==
- Handball at the 2024 Summer Olympics – Men's team rosters
