= Vadim Gayduchenko =

Belarusian handball player

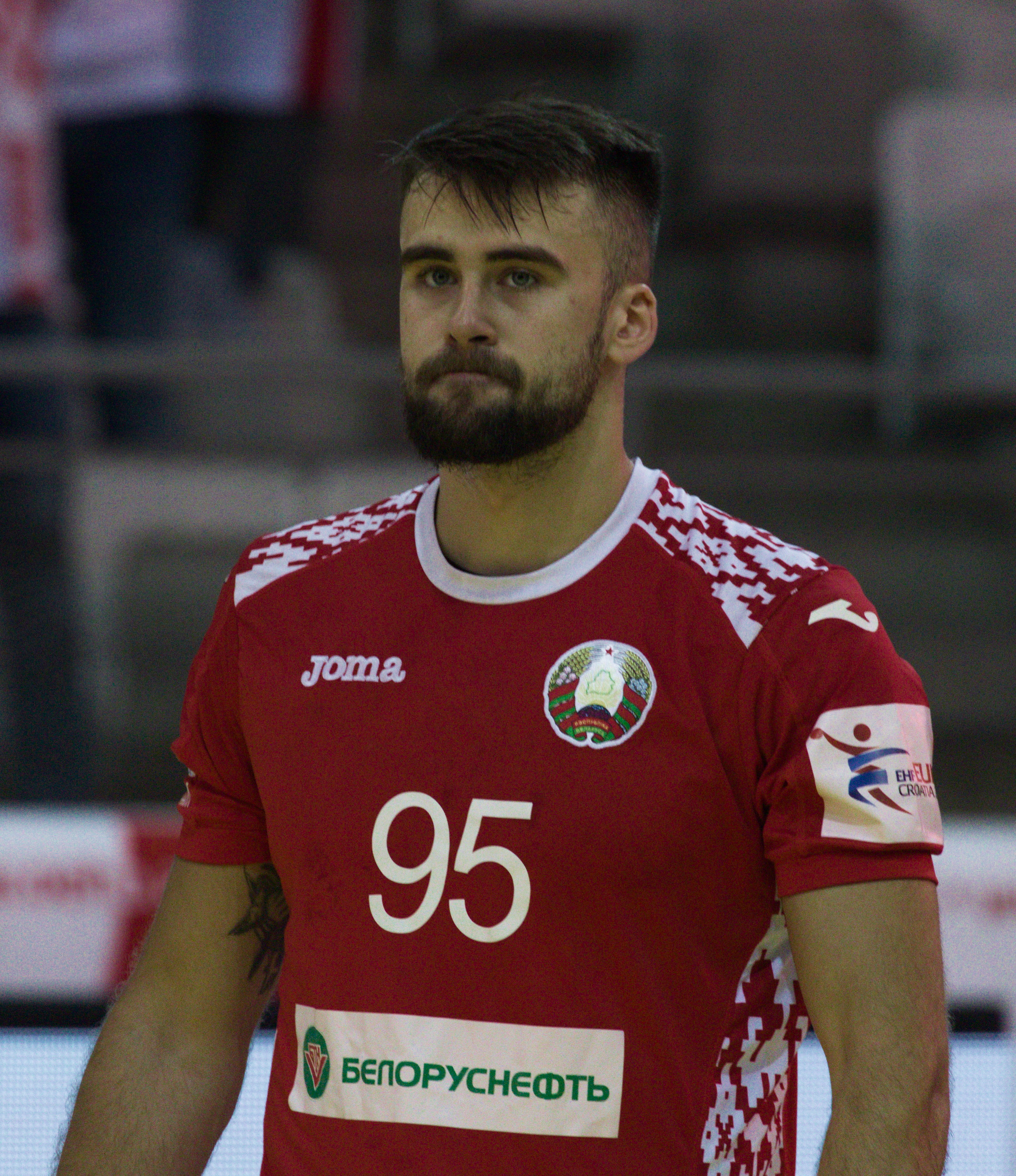

Personal information
- Nationality: Belarusian
- Born: 24 April 1995 (age 31) Babruysk, Belarus
- Height: 1.93 m (6 ft 4 in)

Sport
- Sport: Handball
- Position: Left back
- Current club: Saint-Raphaël Var
- Number: 95

Senior clubs
- Years: Team
- –2013: Masheka Mogilev
- 2013–2017: SKA Minsk
- 2017–2018: Dinamo București
- 2018–2022: Saint-Raphaël Var
- 2022–2024: C' Chartres MHB
- 2024–: Billère Handball
National team
Years	Team	Apps	(Gls)
2013–	Belarus	76	(172)

Vadim Gayduchenko (born 24 April 1995) is a Belarusian handball player for C' Chartres MHB and the Belarusian national team.

He participated at the 2017 World Men's Handball Championship.
