= Hleb Harbuz =

Belarusian handball player

Personal information
- Nationality: Belarusian
- Born: 17 March 1994 (age 32) Minsk, Belarus
- Height: 1.90 m (6 ft 3 in)

Sport
- Sport: Handball
- Position: Left Back
- Current club: HC Victor
- Number: 14

Senior clubs
- Years: Team
- 2011–2014: Dinamo Minsk
- 2014–2015: Neva
- 2015–2017: Handball Tyrol
- 2017: Motor Zaporizhzhia
- 2017–2019: SKA Minsk
- 2019–2022: Kriens-Luzern
- 2022–2023: GC Amicitia Zürich
- 2023–2024: Meshkov Brest
- 2024–2025: TSV St. Otmar St. Gallen
- 2025–2026: Maccabi Tel Aviv
- 2026–: HC Victor
National team
Years	Team	Apps	(Gls)
–	Belarus	6	(7)
- Updated on 3 October 2022

Hleb Harbuz (born 17 March 1994) is a Belarusian handball player for HC Victor and the Belarusian national team.

He participated at the 2018 European Men's Handball Championship, where Belarus finished 10th.
