= Omar Al-Safadi =

Qatari handball player (born 1994)

Personal information
- Nationality: Qatari
- Born: 4 September 1994 (age 32)
- Height: 1.82 m (5 ft 11 1/2 in)

Sport
- Sport: Handball
- Position: Centre back
- Current club: Al-Rayan
- Number: 9
National team
Years	Team	Apps	(Gls)
–	Qatar	23	(48)

Omar Al-Safadi (born 4 September 1994) is a Qatari handball player for Al-Rayan and the Qatari national team.

He participated at the 2017 World Men's Handball Championship.
