= Niclas Kirkeløkke =

Danish handball player (born 1994)

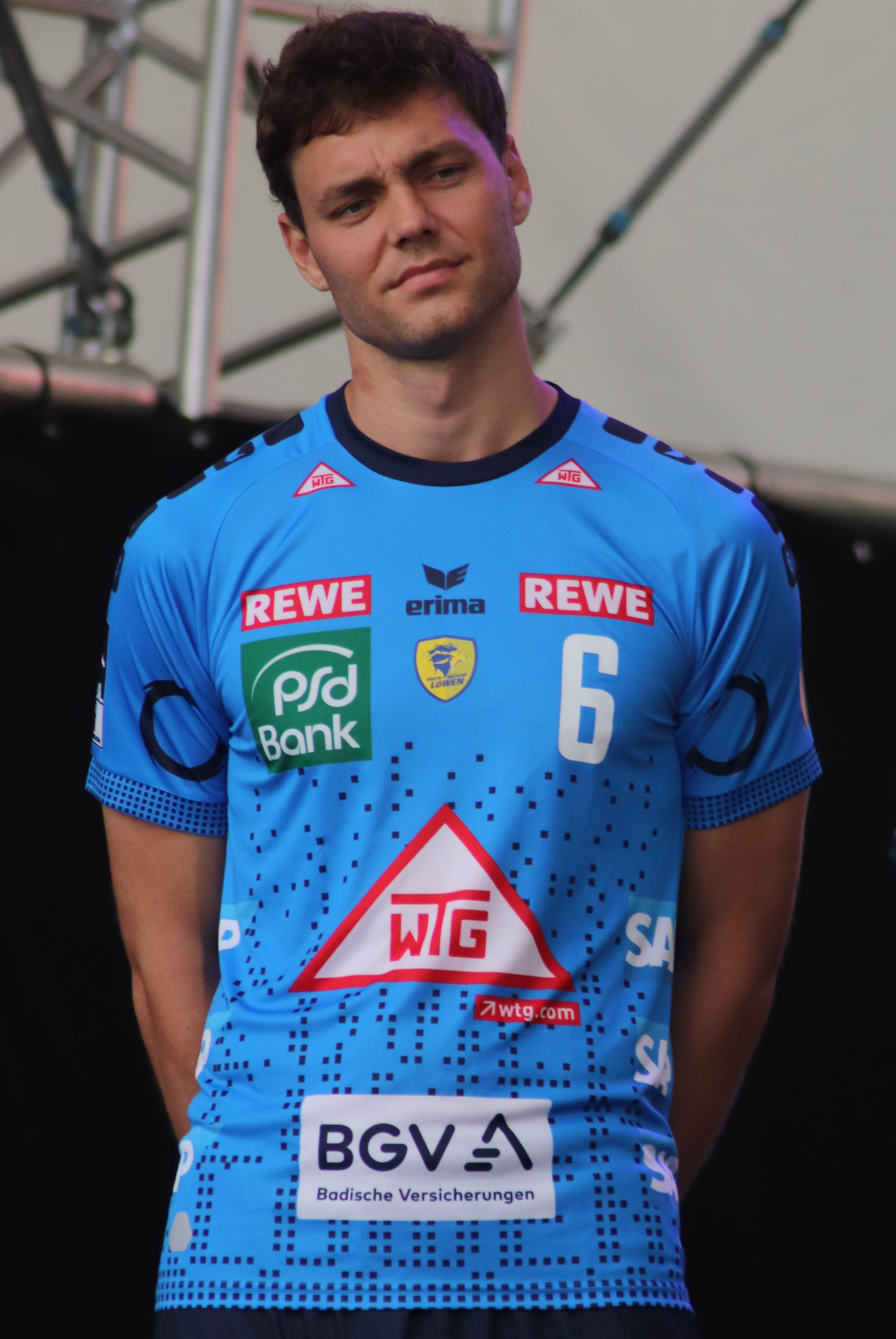
- Kirkeløkke at BUGA 2023 in Mannheim

Personal information
- Full name: Niclas Vest Kirkeløkke
- Born: 26 March 1994 (age 32) Ringe, Denmark
- Height: 1.95 m (6 ft 5 in)

Sport
- Sport: Handball
- Position: Right back
- Current club: SG Flensburg-Handewitt
- Number: 5

Youth career
- Years: Team
- –2005: Risøhøj Håndbold
- 2005–2012: GOG Håndbold

Senior clubs
- Years: Team
- 2012–2019: GOG Håndbold
- 2019–2024: Rhein-Neckar Löwen
- 2024–2027: SG Flensburg-Handewitt
- 2027–: Fredericia HK
National team
Years	Team	Apps	(Gls)
2016–	Denmark	118	(217)
Medal record
Olympic Games
Gold medal – first place	2024 Paris	Team
World Championship
Gold medal – first place	2023 Poland/Sweden
Gold medal – first place	2025 Croatia/Denmark/Norway
European Championship
Gold medal – first place	2026 Denmark/Norway/Sweden
Silver medal – second place	2024 Germany
Bronze medal – third place	2022 Hungary/Slovakia
Youth World Championship
Gold medal – first place	2013 Hungary
Youth European Championship
Bronze medal – third place	2012 Austria
Youth Olympics
Gold medal – first place	2011 Turkey
- Updated on 2 February 2026

Niclas Vest Kirkeløkke (born 26 March 1994) is a Danish handball player for SG Flensburg-Handewitt and the Danish national team. He primarily plays right back but has also been deployed as a right winger for the national team. This shift is largely due to his strong defensive skills in the right back position and to accommodate Mathias Gidsel on the right back position.

== Career ==
Kirkeløkke began his handball career in Risøhøj Håndbold at the U6 age group, before making the move to GOG at the age of 11.

In 2012, he was promoted to the senior team of GOG, then playing in the second tier, the 1st Division. He participated in the 2013 Men's Youth World Handball Championship, where Denmark won the tournament by beating Croatia in the final, and he was named to the all-star team.

He debuted for the Danish national team on 3 November 2016 against the Netherlands. Two months later, he played in his first major international tournament, the 2017 World Men's Handball Championship.

In 2018, he joined German club Rhein-Neckar Löwen. In May 2021, he extended his contract with the club. With Rhein-Neckar Löwen, he won the 2022–23 DHB-Pokal.

In 2023, he was part of the Danish team that won the 2023 World Championship.

For the 2024–25 season, he joined league rivals SG Flensburg-Handewitt on a three-year deal.

In 2025, he won the World Championship for the second time with Denmark.

At the 2026 European Men's Handball Championship he won gold medals, meaning that Denmark held both the World, European and Olympic titles at the same time, as only the second team ever after France's 'Les Experts'.

== Individual awards ==
- All-Star Right back of the Youth World Championship: 2013

== Personal life ==
Kirkeløkke is the son of Gun-Britt Kirkeløkke, who played many matches for the youth and junior national teams in the early 1980s. Gun-Britt's twin sister, Gun-Maj Kirkeløkke, also played 25 A-national matches from 1985 to 1987. His sister, Sarah Kirkeløkke, is also a professional handball player.
