= Nemanja Mladenović (handballer) =

Serbian handball player (born 1994)

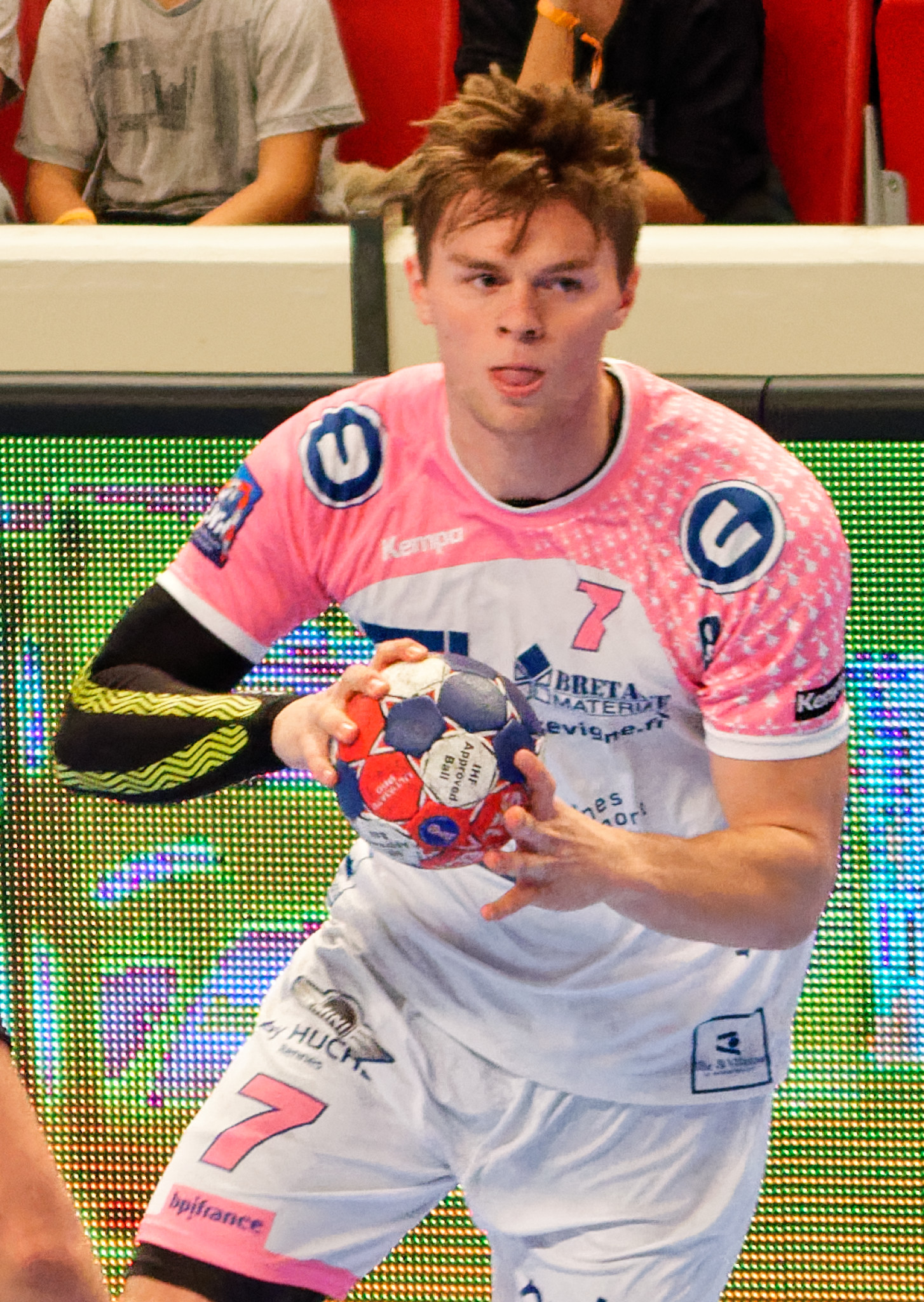

Personal information
- Nationality: Serbian
- Born: January 4, 1994 (age 32) Sombor, Serbia
- Height: 1.96 m (6 ft 5 in)

Sport
- Sport: Handball
- Position: Centre Back, Left Back
- Current club: Al-Khaleej Club
- Number: 31

Youth career
- Years: Team
- –2011: (Hungary) MVM Veszprém KC
- 2011–2013: (Germany) VfL Gummersbach

Senior clubs
- Years: Team
- 2012–2014: (Germany) VfL Gummersbach
- 2014–2015: (Germany) HC Empor Rostock
- 2015–2016: (France) Cesson Rennes MHB
- 2016–2017: (North Macedonia) RK Metalurg Skopje
- 2017–2019: (Romania) HC Dobrogea Sud
- 2019–2020: (Portugal) Sporting CP
- 2020–2021: (Qatar) Al Ahli SC
- 2022–: (Saudi Arabia) Al-Khaleej Club
National team
Years	Team	Apps
–	Serbia	19

Nemanja Mladenović (born 4 January 1994) is a Serbian handball player who plays for Saudi Arabian Al-Khaleej Club.
