= Tilen Kodrin =

Slovenian handball player (born 1994)

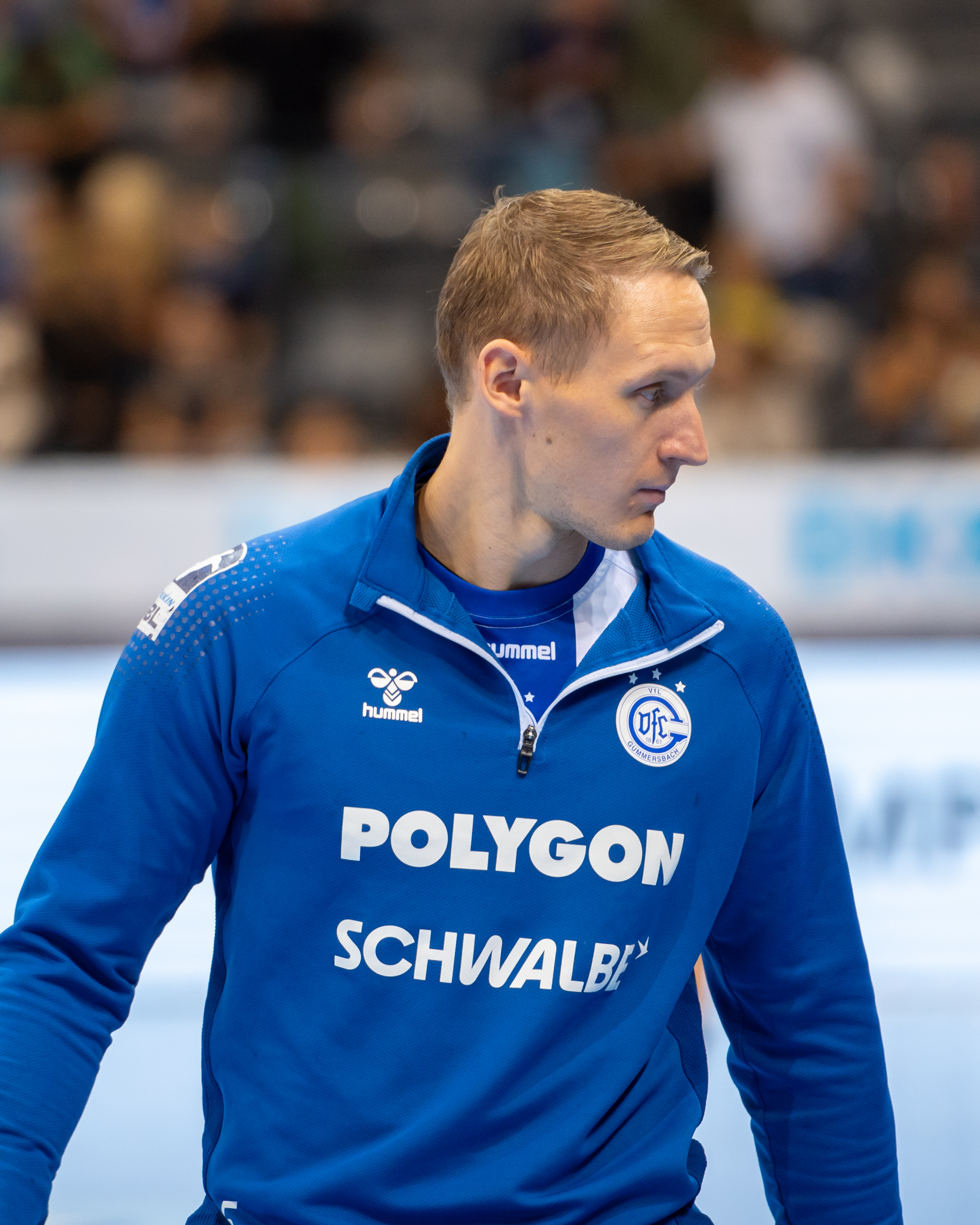
- Kodrin in 2024

Personal information
- Nationality: Slovenian
- Born: 14 May 1994 (age 32) Celje, Slovenia
- Height: 1.92 m (6 ft 4 in)

Sport
- Sport: Handball
- Position: Left wing
- Current club: VfL Gummersbach
- Number: 5

Youth career
- Years: Team
- –2012: RK Celje

Senior clubs
- Years: Team
- 2013–2014: RK Maribor Branik
- 2014–2022: RK Celje
- 2022–: VfL Gummersbach
National team
Years	Team	Apps	(Gls)
2016–	Slovenia	113	(200)
Medal record
World Championship
Bronze medal – third place	2017 France
- Updated on 24 January 2026

Tilen Kodrin (born 14 May 1994) is a Slovenian handball player who plays for VfL Gummersbach and the Slovenia national team.

He represented Slovenia at the 2017 World Men's Handball Championship and the 2024 Summer Olympics.
