= Christoph Neuhold =

Austrian handball player (born 1994)

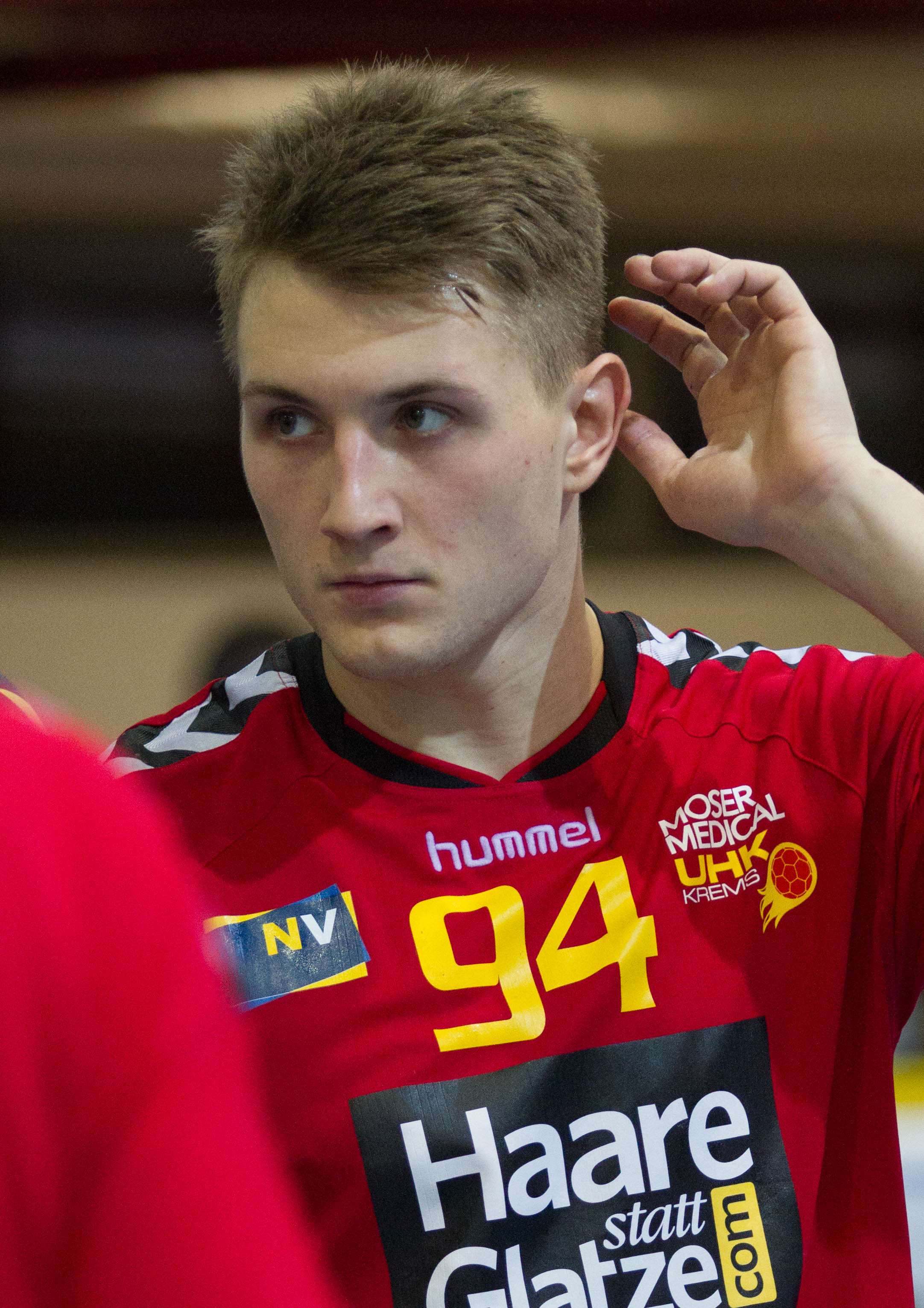

Personal information
- Nationality: Austrian
- Born: 27 April 1994 (age 32)
- Height: 1.93 m (6 ft 4 in)

Sport
- Sport: Handball
- Position: Left back
- Current club: ASV Hamm-Westfalen
- Number: 94
National team
Years	Team	Apps	(Gls)
–	Austria	42	(19)
- Updated on 16 May 2022

Christoph Neuhold (born 27 April 1994) is an Austrian handball player for ASV Hamm-Westfalen and the Austrian national team.

He participated at the 2018 European Men's Handball Championship.
