= Shinnosuke Tokuda =

Japanese handball player (born 1995)

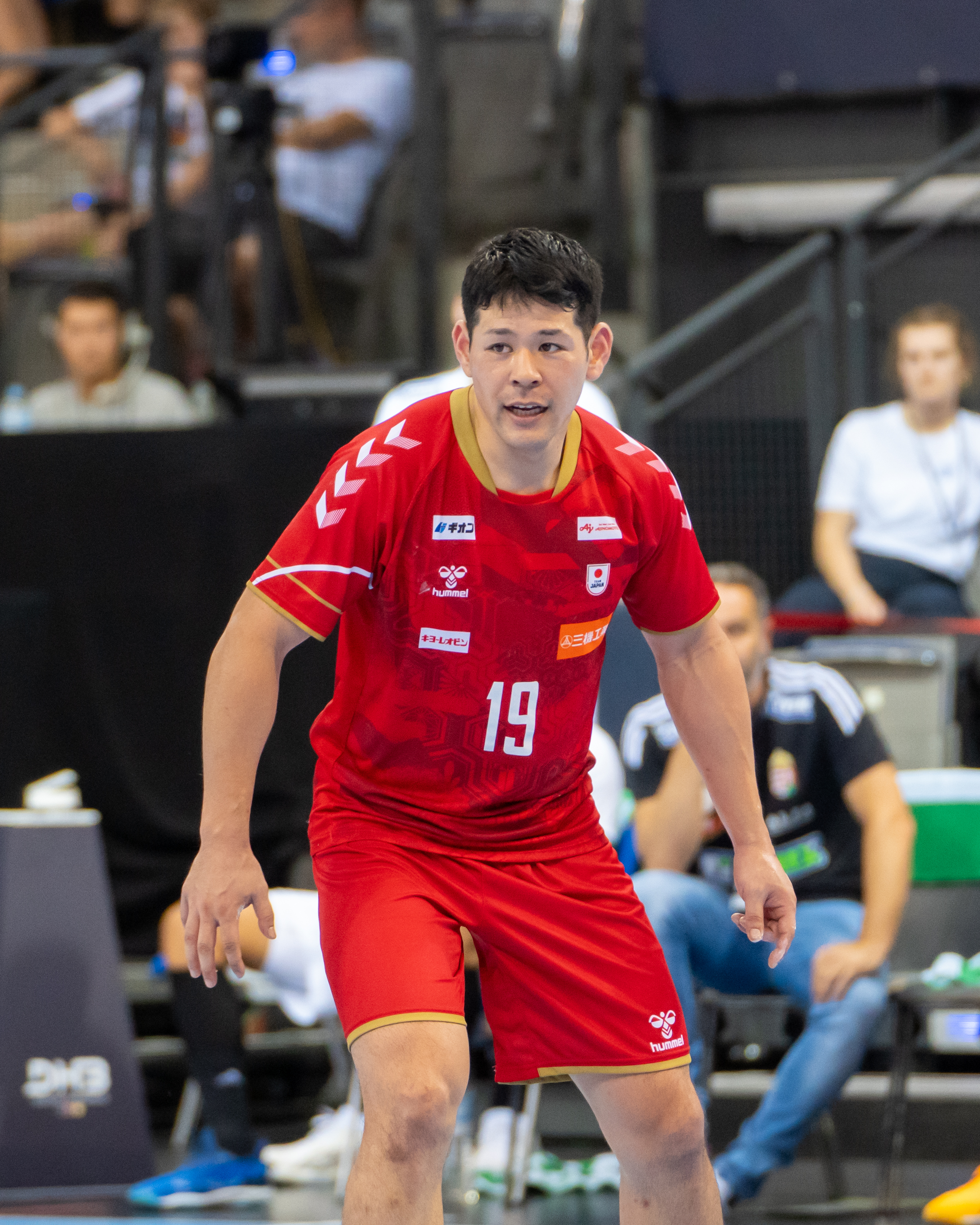

Personal information
- Nationality: Japanese
- Born: 6 December 1995 (age 30) Iwakuni, Japan
- Height: 1.78 m (5 ft 10 in)

Sport
- Sport: Handball
- Position: Right back
- Current club: toyota boshoku kyushu red tornado saga
- Number: 46
National team
Years	Team	Apps	(Gls)
2016–	Japan	35	(129)
Medal record
Asian Championship
Silver medal – second place	2024 Bahrain

Shinnosuke Tokuda (徳田 新之介, Tokuda Shinnosuke; born 6 December 1995) is a Japanese handball player for Saudi Arabian Khaleej Club and the Japanese national team.

He participated at the 2017 World Men's Handball Championship.
