= Lovro Mihić =

Croatian handball player (born 1994)

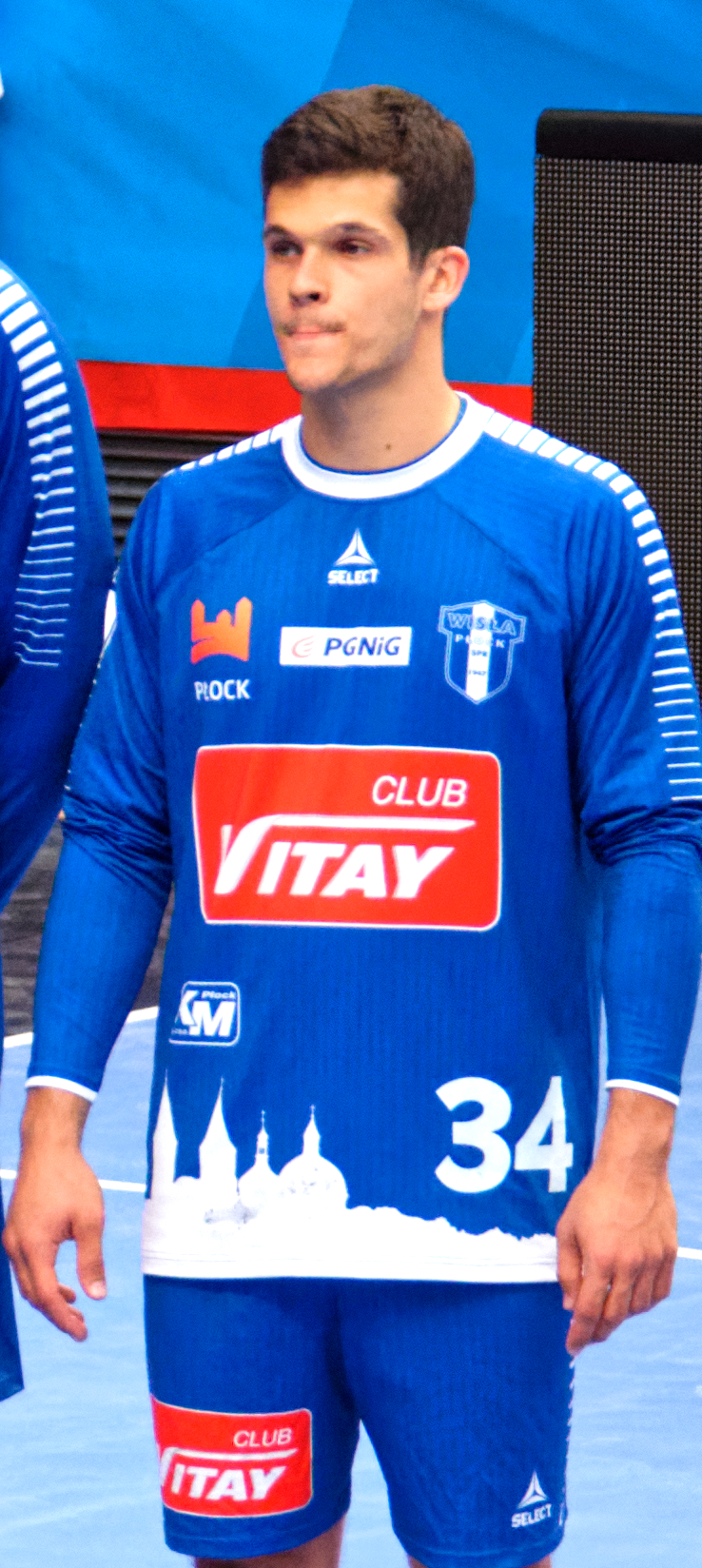
- Mihić in 2016

Personal information
- Nationality: Croatian
- Born: 25 August 1994 (age 32) Zagreb, Croatia
- Height: 1.80 m (5 ft 11 in)

Sport
- Sport: Handball
- Position: Left wing
- Current club: Wisła Płock
- Number: 34

Senior clubs
- Years: Team
- 2012–2016: RK Zagreb
- 2016–: Wisła Płock
National team
Years	Team	Apps	(Gls)
2015–	Croatia	73	(107)
- Updated on 17 January 2026

Lovro Mihić (born 25 August 1994) is a Croatian handball player who plays for Wisła Płock and the Croatian national team.

He participated at the 2017 World Men's Handball Championship and the 2024 Summer Olympics.
