= 2026–27 DHB-Pokal =

DHB-Pokal
- 2026–27

Tournament information
- Sport: Handball
- Dates: 21 August 2026–11 April 2027
- Teams: 42
- Website: HBL

Tournament statistics
- Matches played: 41
- Goals scored: 2982 (72.73 per match)
- Attendance: 70,955 (1,731 per match)
- Top scorer(s): Jonas Kämper (12 goals)

The 2026–27 DHB-Pokal is the 50th edition of the tournament, running from 21 August 2026 to 11 April 2027.

== Format ==
In the first round ten teams from the Bundesliga, all 18 teams from the 2. Bunesliga and 14 teams from the 3. Liga will face against each other. The teams will be split into a north-and south group. In the second round, the remaining teams from the Bundesliga join, except for the three best-placed teams from the last edition, those will join in the round of 16. The tournament will come to an end with a final four in the Lanxess Arena in Cologne.

== Schedule ==
The rounds of the 2026–27 competition were scheduled as follows:

Round	Matches
First round	21–23 August 2026
Second round	22–24 September 2026
Round of 16	10–12 November 2026
Quarterfinals	16–17 December 2026
Final four	10–11 April 2027

Times are UTC+2 (November and December games are UTC+1)

== First round ==
The draw took place on 24 June 2026. The games were played between 21 and 23 August 2026.

21 August 2026; 18:30	HC Oppenweiler/Backnang	29–31	HSC 2000 Coburg	Murrtal-Arena, Backnang; Attendance: 450; Referees: Kern, Kuschel
21 August 2026; 18:30	Klingler 9	(12–17)	Wesseling 7	Murrtal-Arena, Backnang; Attendance: 450; Referees: Kern, Kuschel
21 August 2026; 18:30	2× (suspension)	Report	3× (suspension)	Murrtal-Arena, Backnang; Attendance: 450; Referees: Kern, Kuschel

21 August 2026
19:00
TUSEM Essen
36–33 (ET)
SC DHfK Leipzig
Sportpark Am Hallo, Essen
Attendance: 1,221
Referees: Cesnik, Konrad
Werschkull 8
(15–16)
Semper 7
2× (suspension)
Report
1× (yellow card) 4× (suspension) 1× (red card)

FT: 26–26 ET: 5–5, 5–2

21 August 2026; 19:30	ASV Hamm-Westfalen	28–32	Dessau-Roßlauer HV	Westpress Arena, Hamm; Attendance: 977; Referees: Bärmann, Bärmann
21 August 2026; 19:30	Firnhaber 7	(19–16)	Nowak 9	Westpress Arena, Hamm; Attendance: 977; Referees: Bärmann, Bärmann
21 August 2026; 19:30	1× (suspension)	Report	1× (suspension)	Westpress Arena, Hamm; Attendance: 977; Referees: Bärmann, Bärmann

21 August 2026; 19:30	TuS Ferndorf	29–36	TSV Hannover-Burgdorf	Sporthalle Stählerwiese, Kreuztal; Attendance: 1,077; Referees: vom Dorff, vom Dorff
21 August 2026; 19:30	Jansen 8	(17–20)	Pedersen 10	Sporthalle Stählerwiese, Kreuztal; Attendance: 1,077; Referees: vom Dorff, vom Dorff
21 August 2026; 19:30	3× (suspension)	Report	2× (suspension)	Sporthalle Stählerwiese, Kreuztal; Attendance: 1,077; Referees: vom Dorff, vom Dorff

21 August 2026; 19:30	TV Emsdetten	29–25	TuS Nettelstedt-Lübbecke	Ems-Halle, Emsdetten; Attendance: 1,637; Referees: Friedel, Herrmann
21 August 2026; 19:30	Terhaer 7	(17–14)	Bergemann 6	Ems-Halle, Emsdetten; Attendance: 1,637; Referees: Friedel, Herrmann
21 August 2026; 19:30	1× (yellow card) 3× (suspension) 1× (red card)	Report	5× (suspension)	Ems-Halle, Emsdetten; Attendance: 1,637; Referees: Friedel, Herrmann

21 August 2026; 19:30	TuS Spenge	23–36	GWD Minden	Großturnhalle Spenge, Spenge; Attendance: 750; Referees: Gimmler, Rips
21 August 2026; 19:30	Meyer 4	(8–19)	Weber 7	Großturnhalle Spenge, Spenge; Attendance: 750; Referees: Gimmler, Rips
21 August 2026; 19:30	1× (suspension)	Report	3× (suspension)	Großturnhalle Spenge, Spenge; Attendance: 750; Referees: Gimmler, Rips

21 August 2026; 20:00	SG Pforzheim-Eutingen	22–30	SG BBM Bietigheim	Bertha-Benz-Halle, Pforzheim; Attendance: 1,300; Referees: Kauth, Kolb
21 August 2026; 20:00	Broschwitz 4	(14–14)	Hermann, Orlov 6	Bertha-Benz-Halle, Pforzheim; Attendance: 1,300; Referees: Kauth, Kolb
21 August 2026; 20:00	5× (suspension)	Report	4× (suspension)	Bertha-Benz-Halle, Pforzheim; Attendance: 1,300; Referees: Kauth, Kolb

21 August 2026; 20:00	TSB Heilbronn-Horkheim	26–39	TVB Stuttgart	Stauwehrhalle, Heilbronn; Attendance: 750; Referees: Kuttler, Merz
21 August 2026; 20:00	Starz 7	(11–18)	Darmoul, Zieker 8	Stauwehrhalle, Heilbronn; Attendance: 750; Referees: Kuttler, Merz
21 August 2026; 20:00	1× (suspension)	Report	2× (yellow card) 3× (suspension)	Stauwehrhalle, Heilbronn; Attendance: 750; Referees: Kuttler, Merz

21 August 2026; 20:15	HSG Hanau	26–37	HC Erlangen	Main-Kinzig-Halle, Hanau; Attendance: 716; Referees: Hellbusch, Jansen
21 August 2026; 20:15	Rivic 7	(12–19)	Lochman 7	Main-Kinzig-Halle, Hanau; Attendance: 716; Referees: Hellbusch, Jansen
21 August 2026; 20:15	1× (yellow card) 3× (suspension)	Report	3× (suspension)	Main-Kinzig-Halle, Hanau; Attendance: 716; Referees: Hellbusch, Jansen

21 August 2026; 20:15	TV Gelnhausen	25–27	TV Hüttenberg	Rudi-Lechleidner-Halle, Gelnhausen; Attendance: 1,150; Referees: Hurst, Krag
21 August 2026; 20:15	Malolepszy 7	(14–12)	Kuntscher 7	Rudi-Lechleidner-Halle, Gelnhausen; Attendance: 1,150; Referees: Hurst, Krag
21 August 2026; 20:15	1× (yellow card) 3× (suspension) 1× (red card)	Report	4× (suspension)	Rudi-Lechleidner-Halle, Gelnhausen; Attendance: 1,150; Referees: Hurst, Krag

21 August 2026; 20:30	TuS Vinnhorst	32–33	1. VfL Potsdam	Sportzentrum TuS Vinnhorst, Hanover; Attendance: 450; Referees: Blümel, Linker
21 August 2026; 20:30	Kalafut 7	(13–14)	Schröder 8	Sportzentrum TuS Vinnhorst, Hanover; Attendance: 450; Referees: Blümel, Linker
21 August 2026; 20:30	2× (yellow card) 6× (suspension)	Report	2× (yellow card) 7× (suspension)	Sportzentrum TuS Vinnhorst, Hanover; Attendance: 450; Referees: Blümel, Linker

23 August 2026; 15:30	TSV Bayer Dormagen	26–34	ThSV Eisenach	TSV Bayer Sportcenter, Dormagen; Attendance: 1,270; Referees: Heine, Standke
23 August 2026; 15:30	Köster, Leis 4	(14–12)	Aellen 19	TSV Bayer Sportcenter, Dormagen; Attendance: 1,270; Referees: Heine, Standke
23 August 2026; 15:30	6× (suspension)	Report	1× (yellow card) 6× (suspension)	TSV Bayer Sportcenter, Dormagen; Attendance: 1,270; Referees: Heine, Standke

23 August 2026; 16:00	TSV Altenholz	25–37	VfL Lübeck-Schwartau	Edgar-Meschkat-Halle, Altenholz; Attendance: 750; Referees: Müller, Müller
23 August 2026; 16:00	Szilágyi 8	(11–18)	Holpert 7	Edgar-Meschkat-Halle, Altenholz; Attendance: 750; Referees: Müller, Müller
23 August 2026; 16:00	1× (yellow card) 3× (suspension)	Report	3× (suspension) 1× (red card)	Edgar-Meschkat-Halle, Altenholz; Attendance: 750; Referees: Müller, Müller

23 August 2026; 16:00	SV Salamander Kornwestheim	29–33	Rhein-Neckar Löwen	Sporthalle Ost, Kornwestheim; Attendance: 950; Referees: Kuttler, Merz
23 August 2026; 16:00	Kazmeier 8	(15–18)	Mierzwa, Þrastarson 6	Sporthalle Ost, Kornwestheim; Attendance: 950; Referees: Kuttler, Merz
23 August 2026; 16:00	2× (suspension)	Report	1× (yellow card) 3× (suspension)	Sporthalle Ost, Kornwestheim; Attendance: 950; Referees: Kuttler, Merz

23 August 2026; 16:00	HG Saarlouis	29–34	Frisch Auf Göppingen	Joachim-Deckarm-Halle, Saarbrücken; Attendance: 800; Referees: Kijowsky, Strüder
23 August 2026; 16:00	Noh 7	(14–18)	Persson 9	Joachim-Deckarm-Halle, Saarbrücken; Attendance: 800; Referees: Kijowsky, Strüder
23 August 2026; 16:00	4× (suspension)	Report	1× (yellow card) 2× (suspension) 1× (red card)	Joachim-Deckarm-Halle, Saarbrücken; Attendance: 800; Referees: Kijowsky, Strüder

23 August 2026; 16:30	MTV Braunschweig	28–39	HSV Hamburg	Volkswagen Halle, Braunschweig; Attendance: 3,050; Referees: Köppl, Regner
23 August 2026; 16:30	Hagen 6	(11–21)	Beyer, Jørgensen 7	Volkswagen Halle, Braunschweig; Attendance: 3,050; Referees: Köppl, Regner
23 August 2026; 16:30	1× (yellow card) 2× (suspension)	Report		Volkswagen Halle, Braunschweig; Attendance: 3,050; Referees: Köppl, Regner

23 August 2026; 17:00	HSG Krefeld Niederrhein	29–35	VfL Eintracht Hagen	Glockenspitzhalle, Krefeld; Attendance: 715; Referees: Otto, Piper
23 August 2026; 17:00	Jagieniak 5	(11–20)	Busch, Norouzinezhad 6	Glockenspitzhalle, Krefeld; Attendance: 715; Referees: Otto, Piper
23 August 2026; 17:00	5× (suspension)	Report	4× (suspension)	Glockenspitzhalle, Krefeld; Attendance: 715; Referees: Otto, Piper

23 August 2026; 17:00	TV Großwallstadt	31–38	HBW Balingen-Weilstetten	Untermainhalle, Elsenfeld; Attendance: 910; Referees: Baumgart, Dinges
23 August 2026; 17:00	Klein, Redkyn 5	(16–21)	Pfattheicher, Raguse 9	Untermainhalle, Elsenfeld; Attendance: 910; Referees: Baumgart, Dinges
23 August 2026; 17:00	4× (suspension)	Report	1× (yellow card) 2× (suspension)	Untermainhalle, Elsenfeld; Attendance: 910; Referees: Baumgart, Dinges

23 August 2026; 17:00	Eulen Ludwigshafen	28–33	HSG Wetzlar	Friedrich-Ebert-Halle, Ludwigshafen; Attendance: 1,081; Referees: Hurst, Krag
23 August 2026; 17:00	Schmitt 7	(13–18)	Kirschner 7	Friedrich-Ebert-Halle, Ludwigshafen; Attendance: 1,081; Referees: Hurst, Krag
23 August 2026; 17:00	1× (yellow card) 5× (suspension)	Report	1× (yellow card) 6× (suspension)	Friedrich-Ebert-Halle, Ludwigshafen; Attendance: 1,081; Referees: Hurst, Krag

23 August 2026; 17:00	Longericher SC	37–35	HSG Nordhorn-Lingen	Sporthalle Carl-von-Ossietzky Gesamtschule, Cologne; Attendance: 350; Referees: Hellbusch, Jansen
23 August 2026; 17:00	Kämper 12	(20–22)	Marschall 10	Sporthalle Carl-von-Ossietzky Gesamtschule, Cologne; Attendance: 350; Referees: Hellbusch, Jansen
23 August 2026; 17:00	2× (suspension)	Report	1× (suspension)	Sporthalle Carl-von-Ossietzky Gesamtschule, Cologne; Attendance: 350; Referees: Hellbusch, Jansen

23 August 2026; 17:00	EHV Aue	25–38	HC Elbflorenz 2006	Erzgebirgshalle, Lößnitz; Attendance: 1,150; Referees: Fedtke, Wienrich
23 August 2026; 17:00	Bones 8	(15–21)	Fuhrmann, Preußner 5	Erzgebirgshalle, Lößnitz; Attendance: 1,150; Referees: Fedtke, Wienrich
23 August 2026; 17:00	3× (suspension) 1× (red card)	Report	4× (suspension)	Erzgebirgshalle, Lößnitz; Attendance: 1,150; Referees: Fedtke, Wienrich

== Second round ==
The draw took place on 30 August 2026. The games were played between 22 and 24 September 2026.

22 September 2026; 18:30	HC Elbflorenz 2006	30–31	HSV Hamburg	BallsportArena Dresden, Dresden; Attendance: 1,666; Referees: Hellbusch, Jansen
22 September 2026; 18:30	Löser 7	(18–14)	Andersen 9	BallsportArena Dresden, Dresden; Attendance: 1,666; Referees: Hellbusch, Jansen
22 September 2026; 18:30	1× (suspension)	Report	3× (suspension)	BallsportArena Dresden, Dresden; Attendance: 1,666; Referees: Hellbusch, Jansen

22 September 2026
19:00
MT Melsungen
35–33 (ET)
Rhein-Neckar Löwen
Rothenbach-Halle, Kassel
Attendance: 1,955
Referees: Hurst, Krag
Mensing 7
(16–17)
Kohlbacher 8
1× (yellow card) 2× (suspension)
Report
1× (yellow card) 2× (suspension)

FT: 29–29 ET: 6–4

23 September 2026; 19:00	Dessau-Roßlauer HV	28–38	VfL Gummersbach	Anhalt-Arena, Dessau; Attendance: 1,769; Referees: Friedel, Herrmann
23 September 2026; 19:00	Hadzimuhamedovic, Schüler 6	(12–20)	Roganović 10	Anhalt-Arena, Dessau; Attendance: 1,769; Referees: Friedel, Herrmann
23 September 2026; 19:00	2× (suspension)	Report	1× (suspension)	Anhalt-Arena, Dessau; Attendance: 1,769; Referees: Friedel, Herrmann

23 September 2026; 19:00	HBW Balingen-Weilstetten	35–28	TSV Hannover-Burgdorf	MaxMey-Generalbau-Arena, Balingen; Attendance: 1,427; Referees: Kauth, Kolb
23 September 2026; 19:00	Dayan, Heinzelmann 6	(15–11)	Fischer 8	MaxMey-Generalbau-Arena, Balingen; Attendance: 1,427; Referees: Kauth, Kolb
23 September 2026; 19:00	2× (suspension)	Report	3× (suspension)	MaxMey-Generalbau-Arena, Balingen; Attendance: 1,427; Referees: Kauth, Kolb

23 September 2026; 19:00	SC Magdeburg	38–28	HSG Wetzlar	GETEC Arena, Magdeburg; Attendance: 4,318; Referees: Bona, Frank
23 September 2026; 19:00	Saugstrup 8	(19–14)	Kirschner, Mappes 7	GETEC Arena, Magdeburg; Attendance: 4,318; Referees: Bona, Frank
23 September 2026; 19:00	1× (yellow card)	Report	6× (suspension)	GETEC Arena, Magdeburg; Attendance: 4,318; Referees: Bona, Frank

23 September 2026; 19:00	TV Hüttenberg	23–41	THW Kiel	Mittelhessen-Arena, Wetzlar; Attendance: 3,560; Referees: Hartmann, Hennekes
23 September 2026; 19:00	Kuntscher 8	(11–22)	Makuc 6	Mittelhessen-Arena, Wetzlar; Attendance: 3,560; Referees: Hartmann, Hennekes
23 September 2026; 19:00	2× (suspension)	Report		Mittelhessen-Arena, Wetzlar; Attendance: 3,560; Referees: Hartmann, Hennekes

23 September 2026; 19:00	VfL Lübeck-Schwartau	35–38	SG Flensburg-Handewitt	Hansehalle, Lübeck; Attendance: 2,235; Referees: Schulze, Tönnies
23 September 2026; 19:00	Hagedorn 11	(19–16)	Pytlick 11	Hansehalle, Lübeck; Attendance: 2,235; Referees: Schulze, Tönnies
23 September 2026; 19:00	1× (yellow card) 1× (suspension)	Report	3× (suspension)	Hansehalle, Lübeck; Attendance: 2,235; Referees: Schulze, Tönnies

23 September 2026; 19:30	HSC 2000 Coburg	26–36	Frisch Auf Göppingen	HUK-Coburg arena, Coburg; Attendance: 1,342; Referees: Gimmler, Rips
23 September 2026; 19:30	Savvas 8	(14–16)	Ten Velde 11	HUK-Coburg arena, Coburg; Attendance: 1,342; Referees: Gimmler, Rips
23 September 2026; 19:30	4× (suspension)	Report	3× (suspension)	HUK-Coburg arena, Coburg; Attendance: 1,342; Referees: Gimmler, Rips

23 September 2026; 19:30	SG BBM Bietigheim	32–34	GWD Minden	EgeTrans Arena, Bietigheim-Bissingen; Attendance: 524; Referees: Baumgart, Dinges
23 September 2026; 19:30	Pfeifer 8	(15–19)	Staar 7	EgeTrans Arena, Bietigheim-Bissingen; Attendance: 524; Referees: Baumgart, Dinges
23 September 2026; 19:30	1× (suspension)	Report	2× (yellow card) 4× (suspension) 1× (red card)	EgeTrans Arena, Bietigheim-Bissingen; Attendance: 524; Referees: Baumgart, Dinges

23 September 2026; 19:30	TUSEM Essen	25–32	1. VfL Potsdam	Sportpark am Hallo, Essen; Attendance: 1,127; Referees: Blümel, Linker
23 September 2026; 19:30	Werschkull 6	(14–15)	Siemer 7	Sportpark am Hallo, Essen; Attendance: 1,127; Referees: Blümel, Linker
23 September 2026; 19:30	1× (yellow card) 3× (suspension)	Report	1× (yellow card) 2× (suspension)	Sportpark am Hallo, Essen; Attendance: 1,127; Referees: Blümel, Linker

23 September 2026; 19:30	TV Emsdetten	36–33	ThSV Eisenach	Ems-Halle, Emsdetten; Attendance: 1,699; Referees: Cesnik, Konrad
23 September 2026; 19:30	Tobeler 8	(16–15)	Montebovi 7	Ems-Halle, Emsdetten; Attendance: 1,699; Referees: Cesnik, Konrad
23 September 2026; 19:30	1× (yellow card) 1× (suspension) 1× (red card)	Report	2× (suspension)	Ems-Halle, Emsdetten; Attendance: 1,699; Referees: Cesnik, Konrad

23 September 2026; 20:00	Longericher SC	32–40	VfL Eintracht Hagen	Sporthalle Carl-von-Ossietzky Gesamtschule, Cologne; Attendance: 500; Referees: vom Dorff, vom Dorff
23 September 2026; 20:00	Kremp 8	(16–19)	Busch 10	Sporthalle Carl-von-Ossietzky Gesamtschule, Cologne; Attendance: 500; Referees: vom Dorff, vom Dorff
23 September 2026; 20:00	1× (yellow card) 1× (suspension)	Report	1× (yellow card) 2× (suspension)	Sporthalle Carl-von-Ossietzky Gesamtschule, Cologne; Attendance: 500; Referees: vom Dorff, vom Dorff

24 September 2026; 19:00	TVB Stuttgart	26–29	HC Erlangen	Scharrena Stuttgart, Stuttgart; Attendance: 1,011; Referees: Bärmann, Bärmann
24 September 2026; 19:00	Darmoul 6	(9–13)	Nissen 9	Scharrena Stuttgart, Stuttgart; Attendance: 1,011; Referees: Bärmann, Bärmann
24 September 2026; 19:00	1× (yellow card) 4× (suspension)	Report	1× (yellow card) 3× (suspension)	Scharrena Stuttgart, Stuttgart; Attendance: 1,011; Referees: Bärmann, Bärmann

== Round of 16 ==
The draw took place on 26 September 2026. The games were played on 10 and 12 November 2026.

10 November 2026; 19:30	VfL Eintracht Hagen	33–32	GWD Minden	Ischelandhalle, Hagen; Attendance: 1,412; Referees: Blümel, Linker
10 November 2026; 19:30	Busch 10	(15–11)	three players 5	Ischelandhalle, Hagen; Attendance: 1,412; Referees: Blümel, Linker
10 November 2026; 19:30	2× (yellow card) 5× (suspension)	Report	2× (yellow card) 4× (suspension)	Ischelandhalle, Hagen; Attendance: 1,412; Referees: Blümel, Linker

11 November 2026; 19:00	HBW Balingen-Weilstetten	33–34	Frisch Auf Göppingen	MaxMey-Generalbau-Arena, Balingen; Attendance: 2,128; Referees: Baumgart, Dinges
11 November 2026; 19:00	Raguse 6	(19–19)	Newel 9	MaxMey-Generalbau-Arena, Balingen; Attendance: 2,128; Referees: Baumgart, Dinges
11 November 2026; 19:00	1× (yellow card) 5× (suspension)	Report	2× (yellow card) 5× (suspension)	MaxMey-Generalbau-Arena, Balingen; Attendance: 2,128; Referees: Baumgart, Dinges

11 November 2026; 19:00	SC Magdeburg	43–32	HSV Hamburg	GETEC Arena, Magdeburg; Attendance: 5,833; Referees: Kuttler, Maike Merz
11 November 2026; 19:00	Magnússon 11	(22–19)	Andersen, Schmidt 5	GETEC Arena, Magdeburg; Attendance: 5,833; Referees: Kuttler, Maike Merz
11 November 2026; 19:00		Report	2× (suspension)	GETEC Arena, Magdeburg; Attendance: 5,833; Referees: Kuttler, Maike Merz

11 November 2026; 19:00	TBV Lemgo	34–35	THW Kiel	Phoenix-Contact-Arena, Lemgo; Attendance: 4,520; Referees: Schulze, Tönnies
11 November 2026; 19:00	Versteijnen, Zehnder 6	(14–18)	Makuc, Zerbe 7	Phoenix-Contact-Arena, Lemgo; Attendance: 4,520; Referees: Schulze, Tönnies
11 November 2026; 19:00	1× (yellow card) 2× (suspension)	Report	3× (suspension)	Phoenix-Contact-Arena, Lemgo; Attendance: 4,520; Referees: Schulze, Tönnies

11 November 2026; 19:30	1. VfL Potsdam	30–42	Füchse Berlin	MBS Arena, Potsdam; Attendance: 2,250; Referees: Kauth, Kolb
11 November 2026; 19:30	Savini 6	(14–23)	Gidsel 13	MBS Arena, Potsdam; Attendance: 2,250; Referees: Kauth, Kolb
11 November 2026; 19:30	1× (suspension)	Report	1× (yellow card) 2× (suspension)	MBS Arena, Potsdam; Attendance: 2,250; Referees: Kauth, Kolb

11 November 2026; 19:30	TV Emsdetten	26–38	HC Erlangen	Ems-Halle, Emsdetten; Attendance: 2,100; Referees: Hellbusch, Jansen
11 November 2026; 19:30	Terhaer 5	(15–21)	Bialowas 7	Ems-Halle, Emsdetten; Attendance: 2,100; Referees: Hellbusch, Jansen
11 November 2026; 19:30	1× (suspension)	Report	2× (suspension)	Ems-Halle, Emsdetten; Attendance: 2,100; Referees: Hellbusch, Jansen

12 November 2026; 19:00	MT Melsungen	36–26	Bergischer HC	Rothenbach-Halle, Kassel; Attendance: 2,598; Referees: Cesnik, Konrad
12 November 2026; 19:00	Sigrist 6	(18–10)	Hilding 4	Rothenbach-Halle, Kassel; Attendance: 2,598; Referees: Cesnik, Konrad
12 November 2026; 19:00	1× (suspension)	Report	2× (suspension)	Rothenbach-Halle, Kassel; Attendance: 2,598; Referees: Cesnik, Konrad

12 November 2026; 19:30	SG Flensburg-Handewitt	35–34	VfL Gummersbach	GP Joule Arena, Flensburg; Attendance: 5,477; Referees: Hurst, Krag
12 November 2026; 19:30	Pytlick 9	(18–21)	Schluroff 11	GP Joule Arena, Flensburg; Attendance: 5,477; Referees: Hurst, Krag
12 November 2026; 19:30	2× (yellow card) 1× (suspension)	Report	2× (suspension)	GP Joule Arena, Flensburg; Attendance: 5,477; Referees: Hurst, Krag

== Quarterfinals ==
The draw took place on 15 November 2026. The games will be played on 16 and 17 December 2026.

16 December 2026; 19:00	HC Erlangen	v	Füchse Berlin	PSD Bank Nürnberg Arena, Nuremberg
16 December 2026; 19:00		Report		PSD Bank Nürnberg Arena, Nuremberg

16 December 2026; 19:00	MT Melsungen	v	THW Kiel	Rothenbach-Halle, Kassel
16 December 2026; 19:00		Report		Rothenbach-Halle, Kassel

16 December 2026; 19:30	VfL Eintracht Hagen	v	SC Magdeburg	Ischelandhalle, Hagen
16 December 2026; 19:30		Report		Ischelandhalle, Hagen

17 December 2026; 19:00	SG Flensburg-Handewitt	v	Frisch Auf Göppingen	GP Joule Arena, Flensburg
17 December 2026; 19:00		Report		GP Joule Arena, Flensburg

== Final four ==
The games were played on 10 and 11 April 2027 at the Lanxess Arena, Cologne.

=== Bracket ===
Semi-finals
10 April
10 April

Final
11 April
Third place
11 April

=== Semifinals ===
10 April 2027; 15:45	TBD	v	TBD	Lanxess Arena, Cologne
10 April 2027; 15:45		Report		Lanxess Arena, Cologne

10 April 2027; 18:45	TBD	v	TBD	Lanxess Arena, Cologne
10 April 2027; 18:45		Report		Lanxess Arena, Cologne

=== Third place game ===
11 April 2027; 12:30	LSF1	v	LSF2	Lanxess Arena, Cologne
11 April 2027; 12:30		Report		Lanxess Arena, Cologne

=== Final ===
11 April 2027; 15:30	WSF1	v	WSF2	Lanxess Arena, Cologne
11 April 2027; 15:30		Report		Lanxess Arena, Cologne
