= 2025–26 DHB-Pokal =

DHB-Pokal
- 2025–26

Tournament information
- Sport: Handball
- Dates: 16 August 2025–19 April 2026
- Teams: 40
- Website: HBL

Final positions
- Champions: Füchse Berlin
- Runner-up: Bergischer HC

Tournament statistics
- Matches played: 41
- Goals scored: 2501 (61 per match)
- Attendance: 150,566 (3,672 per match)

The 2025–26 DHB-Pokal was the 49th edition of the tournament, held from 16 August 2025 to 19 April 2026.

== Format ==
In the first round eleven teams from 2. Bunesliga and 3. Liga faced against each other. The teams were split into a north-and south group. In the second round, the teams from the Bundesliga joined, except for the three best-placed teams from the last edition, those joined in the round of 16. The tournament came to an end with a final four in the Lanxess Arena in Cologne.

== Schedule ==
The rounds of the 2025–26 competition were scheduled as follows:

Round	Matches
First round	15–19 August 2025
Second round	30 September – 21 October 2025
Round of 16	5–6 November 2025
Quarterfinals	17–18 December 2025
Final four	18–19 April 2026

Times are UTC+2 (November and December games are UTC+1)

== First round ==
The draw took place on 10 July 2025. The games were played between 15 and 19 August 2025. The match between Bietigheim and Potsdam (both played in Bundesliga last year) was played, because HBW Balingen-Weilstetten, as a second-league club, qualified for the round of 16 after finishing third last year.

15 August 2025; 19:00	HC Empor Rostock	24–35	VfL Eintracht Hagen	Fiete-Reder-Halle, Rostock; Attendance: 403; Referees: Otto, Piper
15 August 2025; 19:00	Dias, Pratschner 7	(11–17)	Kutz, Norouzinezhad 5	Fiete-Reder-Halle, Rostock; Attendance: 403; Referees: Otto, Piper
15 August 2025; 19:00	2× (yellow card) 3× (suspension)	Report	0× (yellow card) 3× (suspension)	Fiete-Reder-Halle, Rostock; Attendance: 403; Referees: Otto, Piper

15 August 2025; 19:30	TuS Vinnhorst	28–31	Dessau-Roßlauer HV 06	Sportzentrum TuS Vinnhorst, Hanover; Attendance: 650; Referees: Engeln, Schmitz
15 August 2025; 19:30	Rohrweber 7	(13–17)	Haake, Nowak 6	Sportzentrum TuS Vinnhorst, Hanover; Attendance: 650; Referees: Engeln, Schmitz
15 August 2025; 19:30	2× (yellow card) 1× (suspension)	Report	1× (yellow card) 3× (suspension)	Sportzentrum TuS Vinnhorst, Hanover; Attendance: 650; Referees: Engeln, Schmitz

16 August 2025; 18:00	Wölfe Würzburg	31–32	TV Großwallstadt	Dreifachsporthalle, Rimpar; Attendance: 554; Referees: Hellbusch, Jansen
16 August 2025; 18:00	Bauder 11	(17–18)	Schalles 9	Dreifachsporthalle, Rimpar; Attendance: 554; Referees: Hellbusch, Jansen
16 August 2025; 18:00	8× (suspension) 1× (red card)	Report	4× (suspension)	Dreifachsporthalle, Rimpar; Attendance: 554; Referees: Hellbusch, Jansen

16 August 2025; 18:00	TSG A-H Bielefeld	24–38	Bergischer HC	Sporthalle am Gymnasium Heepen, Bielefeld; Attendance: 700; Referees: Hillebrand, Umbescheidt
16 August 2025; 18:00	Hörr 6	(14–19)	Maldonado 8	Sporthalle am Gymnasium Heepen, Bielefeld; Attendance: 700; Referees: Hillebrand, Umbescheidt
16 August 2025; 18:00	3× (suspension) 1× (red card)	Report	1× (suspension)	Sporthalle am Gymnasium Heepen, Bielefeld; Attendance: 700; Referees: Hillebrand, Umbescheidt

16 August 2025; 19:00	HSG Krefeld Niederrhein	29–37	GWD Minden	Glockenspitz-Sporthalle, Krefeld; Attendance: 1,107; Referees: Schwarzmeier, Stewen
16 August 2025; 19:00	Persson 10	(17–20)	Kranzmann 6	Glockenspitz-Sporthalle, Krefeld; Attendance: 1,107; Referees: Schwarzmeier, Stewen
16 August 2025; 19:00	1× (yellow card) 4× (suspension) 1× (red card)	Report	3× (suspension) 1× (red card)	Glockenspitz-Sporthalle, Krefeld; Attendance: 1,107; Referees: Schwarzmeier, Stewen

16 August 2025; 19:00	Longericher SC Köln	27–29	TSV Bayer Dormagen	LSC ARENA, Cologne; Attendance: 500; Referees: Engeln, Schmitz
16 August 2025; 19:00	Schulz 6	(11–15)	Strosack 6	LSC ARENA, Cologne; Attendance: 500; Referees: Engeln, Schmitz
16 August 2025; 19:00	1× (yellow card) 5× (suspension)	Report	1× (yellow card) 1× (suspension)	LSC ARENA, Cologne; Attendance: 500; Referees: Engeln, Schmitz

16 August 2025; 19:00	HC Oppenweiler/Backnang	25–30	HC Elbflorenz 2006	Murrtal-Arena, Backnang; Attendance: 400; Referees: Janz, Sug
16 August 2025; 19:00	Diebel 8	(9–16)	Stavast 7	Murrtal-Arena, Backnang; Attendance: 400; Referees: Janz, Sug
16 August 2025; 19:00	2× (suspension)	Report	1× (suspension)	Murrtal-Arena, Backnang; Attendance: 400; Referees: Janz, Sug

16 August 2025; 19:30	TV Gelnhausen	28–37	HSC 2000 Coburg	Rudi-Lechleidner-Halle, Gelnhausen; Attendance: 600; Referees: Seidler, Seidler
16 August 2025; 19:30	Csaba 7	(15–18)	Schmidt 10	Rudi-Lechleidner-Halle, Gelnhausen; Attendance: 600; Referees: Seidler, Seidler
16 August 2025; 19:30	2× (yellow card) 7× (suspension)	Report	1× (yellow card) 6× (suspension) 1× (red card)	Rudi-Lechleidner-Halle, Gelnhausen; Attendance: 600; Referees: Seidler, Seidler

16 August 2025; 19:30	MTV Braunschweig	25–33	TV Emsdetten	Sporthalle Alte Waage, Braunschweig; Attendance: 1,024; Referees: Odabas, van Os
16 August 2025; 19:30	Pieles 7	(13–14)	Széles 11	Sporthalle Alte Waage, Braunschweig; Attendance: 1,024; Referees: Odabas, van Os
16 August 2025; 19:30	3× (suspension)	Report	1× (yellow card) 3× (suspension)	Sporthalle Alte Waage, Braunschweig; Attendance: 1,024; Referees: Odabas, van Os

16 August 2025; 20:00	VfL Pfullingen	20–28	TV 05/07 Hüttenberg	Kurt-App-Sporthalle, Pfullingen; Attendance: 500; Referees: Hörath, Hofmann
16 August 2025; 20:00	Goller, Rix 5	(12–13)	Dyatlov 5	Kurt-App-Sporthalle, Pfullingen; Attendance: 500; Referees: Hörath, Hofmann
16 August 2025; 20:00	1× (yellow card) 7× (suspension) 2× (red card)	Report	1× (yellow card) 6× (suspension)	Kurt-App-Sporthalle, Pfullingen; Attendance: 500; Referees: Hörath, Hofmann

17 August 2025; 17:00	SG BBM Bietigheim	25–24	1. VfL Potsdam	Sporthalle am Viadukt, Bietigheim-Bissingen; Attendance: 680; Referees: Kern, Kuschel
17 August 2025; 17:00	Fischer, Vlahović 5	(13–8)	Mengon 5	Sporthalle am Viadukt, Bietigheim-Bissingen; Attendance: 680; Referees: Kern, Kuschel
17 August 2025; 17:00	4× (suspension)	Report	1× (yellow card) 3× (suspension)	Sporthalle am Viadukt, Bietigheim-Bissingen; Attendance: 680; Referees: Kern, Kuschel

19 August 2025; 19:30	Eintracht Hildesheim	27–35	HSG Nordhorn-Lingen	Volksbank-Arena, Hildesheim; Attendance: 504; Referees: Otto, Piper
19 August 2025; 19:30	Quedenbaum 10	(13–20)	Lux 7	Volksbank-Arena, Hildesheim; Attendance: 504; Referees: Otto, Piper
19 August 2025; 19:30	3× (suspension)	Report	5× (suspension)	Volksbank-Arena, Hildesheim; Attendance: 504; Referees: Otto, Piper

== Second round ==
The draw took place on 23 August 2025. The games were played between 30 September and 21 October 2025.

30 September 2025; 19:30	HSG Nordhorn-Lingen	35–32	HC Erlangen	Euregium, Nordhorn; Attendance: 1,806; Referees: Hartmann, Hennekes
30 September 2025; 19:30	Bandlow 11	(17–16)	Nissen, Steinert 7	Euregium, Nordhorn; Attendance: 1,806; Referees: Hartmann, Hennekes
30 September 2025; 19:30	4× (suspension)	Report	4× (suspension)	Euregium, Nordhorn; Attendance: 1,806; Referees: Hartmann, Hennekes

30 September 2025; 19:30	TV Großwallstadt	35–34	SG BBM Bietigheim	Untermainhalle, Elsenfeld; Attendance: 1,024; Referees: Cesnik, Konrad
30 September 2025; 19:30	Skaarnæs 11	(17–18)	Pfeifer 10	Untermainhalle, Elsenfeld; Attendance: 1,024; Referees: Cesnik, Konrad
30 September 2025; 19:30	1× (yellow card) 3× (suspension)	Report	1× (suspension)	Untermainhalle, Elsenfeld; Attendance: 1,024; Referees: Cesnik, Konrad

1 October 2025; 19:00	Füchse Berlin	35–30	HSG Wetzlar	MBS Arena, Potsdam; Attendance: 1,596; Referees: Kern, Kuschel
1 October 2025; 19:00	Freihöfer, Gidsel 7	(19–15)	Ahouansou, Čavor 6	MBS Arena, Potsdam; Attendance: 1,596; Referees: Kern, Kuschel
1 October 2025; 19:00	1× (yellow card) 1× (suspension)	Report	1× (yellow card) 4× (suspension) 1× (red card)	MBS Arena, Potsdam; Attendance: 1,596; Referees: Kern, Kuschel

1 October 2025; 19:00	Frisch Auf Göppingen	26–28	SC DHfK Leipzig	EWS Arena, Göppingen; Attendance: 3,500; Referees: Köppl, Regner
1 October 2025; 19:00	Schiller 8	(12–14)	Semper 7	EWS Arena, Göppingen; Attendance: 3,500; Referees: Köppl, Regner
1 October 2025; 19:00	1× (yellow card) 2× (suspension)	Report	3× (suspension)	EWS Arena, Göppingen; Attendance: 3,500; Referees: Köppl, Regner

1 October 2025; 19:00	VfL Eintracht Hagen	25–36	TBV Lemgo	Ischelandhalle, Hagen; Attendance: 1,389; Referees: vom Dorff, vom Dorff
1 October 2025; 19:00	Norouzinezhad 8	(11–19)	Suton 11	Ischelandhalle, Hagen; Attendance: 1,389; Referees: vom Dorff, vom Dorff
1 October 2025; 19:00	1× (yellow card)	Report	3× (yellow card) 3× (suspension)	Ischelandhalle, Hagen; Attendance: 1,389; Referees: vom Dorff, vom Dorff

1 October 2025
19:00
HC Elbflorenz 2006
40–40 (ET)
HSV Hamburg
BallsportArena Dresden, Dresden
Attendance: 1,723
Referees: Hellbusch, Jansen
Löser 9
(15–16)
Andersen 12
3× (suspension)
Report
5× (suspension)

FT: 35–35 ET: 2–2, 3–3 Pen: 7–6

1 October 2025; 19:00	TV 05/07 Hüttenberg	21–32	VfL Gummersbach	Sportzentrum Hüttenberg, Hüttenberg; Attendance: 1,450; Referees: Baumgart, Dinges
1 October 2025; 19:00	Dyatlov 5	(8–17)	Gomes, Vujović 5	Sportzentrum Hüttenberg, Hüttenberg; Attendance: 1,450; Referees: Baumgart, Dinges
1 October 2025; 19:00	3× (suspension)	Report	1× (suspension)	Sportzentrum Hüttenberg, Hüttenberg; Attendance: 1,450; Referees: Baumgart, Dinges

1 October 2025; 19:30	TSV Bayer Dormagen	23–38	TSV Hannover-Burgdorf	TSV Bayer Sportcenter, Dormagen; Attendance: 972; Referees: Linker, Schmidt
1 October 2025; 19:30	Böckenholt, Schmidt 4	(13–21)	Pedersen, Poulsen 7	TSV Bayer Sportcenter, Dormagen; Attendance: 972; Referees: Linker, Schmidt
1 October 2025; 19:30	1× (suspension)	Report	2× (yellow card) 3× (suspension)	TSV Bayer Sportcenter, Dormagen; Attendance: 972; Referees: Linker, Schmidt

1 October 2025; 19:30	GWD Minden	25–28	ThSV Eisenach	Merkur Arena, Lübbecke; Attendance: 540; Referees: Bona, Frank
1 October 2025; 19:30	Antanavičius, Weber 6	(13–13)	Büchner 7	Merkur Arena, Lübbecke; Attendance: 540; Referees: Bona, Frank
1 October 2025; 19:30	4× (suspension)	Report	6× (suspension)	Merkur Arena, Lübbecke; Attendance: 540; Referees: Bona, Frank

1 October 2025; 19:30	Rhein-Neckar Löwen	32–38	SG Flensburg-Handewitt	SNP Dome, Heidelberg; Attendance: 3,971; Referees: Hurst, Krag
1 October 2025; 19:30	Kohlbacher 8	(18–18)	three players 7	SNP Dome, Heidelberg; Attendance: 3,971; Referees: Hurst, Krag
1 October 2025; 19:30	2× (suspension)	Report	1× (yellow card) 2× (suspension)	SNP Dome, Heidelberg; Attendance: 3,971; Referees: Hurst, Krag

2 October 2025; 19:00	TV Emsdetten	30–35	TVB Stuttgart	Ems-Halle, Emsdetten; Attendance: 1,761; Referees: Heine, Standke
2 October 2025; 19:00	Damböck 8	(13–18)	Häfner 8	Ems-Halle, Emsdetten; Attendance: 1,761; Referees: Heine, Standke
2 October 2025; 19:00	5× (suspension) 1× (red card)	Report	1× (yellow card) 5× (suspension)	Ems-Halle, Emsdetten; Attendance: 1,761; Referees: Heine, Standke

2 October 2025; 19:30	HSC 2000 Coburg	23–26	Bergischer HC	HUK-Coburg arena, Coburg; Attendance: 1,586; Referees: Hörath, Hofmann
2 October 2025; 19:30	Krone 9	(13–10)	Maldonado 7	HUK-Coburg arena, Coburg; Attendance: 1,586; Referees: Hörath, Hofmann
2 October 2025; 19:30	2× (suspension)	Report	2× (suspension)	HUK-Coburg arena, Coburg; Attendance: 1,586; Referees: Hörath, Hofmann

21 October 2025; 19:00	Dessau-Roßlauer HV 06	34–44	SC Magdeburg	Anhalt-Arena, Dessau-Roßlau; Attendance: 2,845; Referees: Thöne, Zupanovic
21 October 2025; 19:00	Danneberg 10	(15–19)	Magnússon 8	Anhalt-Arena, Dessau-Roßlau; Attendance: 2,845; Referees: Thöne, Zupanovic
21 October 2025; 19:00	4× (suspension)	Report	2× (yellow card) 2× (suspension)	Anhalt-Arena, Dessau-Roßlau; Attendance: 2,845; Referees: Thöne, Zupanovic

== Round of 16 ==
The draw was held on 9 October 2025. The games were played between 5 and 6 November 2025.

5 November 2025
19:00
HC Elbflorenz 2006
30–32 (ET)
MT Melsungen
BallsportArena Dresden, Dresden
Attendance: 2,704
Referees: Schulze, Tönnies
Dierberg 9
(14–12)
Drosten 6
3× (suspension)
Report
5× (suspension)

FT: 25–25 ET: 5–7

5 November 2025
19:00
Bergischer HC
40–38 (ET)
TSV Hannover-Burgdorf
Uni-Halle, Wuppertal
Attendance: 2,384
Referees: Heine, Standke
Beyer 10
(15–12)
Pedersen 9
2× (yellow card) 6× (suspension) 1× (red card)
Report
2× (yellow card) 3× (suspension) 1× (red card)

FT: 28–28 ET: 12–10

5 November 2025; 19:00	HBW Balingen-Weilstetten	36–41	THW Kiel	Mey-Generalbau-Arena, Balingen; Attendance: 2,350; Referees: Baumgart, Dinges
5 November 2025; 19:00	Heinzelmann, Pfattheicher 8	(17–19)	Reinkind 8	Mey-Generalbau-Arena, Balingen; Attendance: 2,350; Referees: Baumgart, Dinges
5 November 2025; 19:00	1× (yellow card) 7× (suspension)	Report	5× (suspension)	Mey-Generalbau-Arena, Balingen; Attendance: 2,350; Referees: Baumgart, Dinges

5 November 2025; 19:00	TBV Lemgo	30–27	VfL Gummersbach	Lipperlandhalle, Lemgo; Attendance: 3,995; Referees: Hurst, Krag
5 November 2025; 19:00	Schagen 6	(17–13)	Schluroff, Smits 6	Lipperlandhalle, Lemgo; Attendance: 3,995; Referees: Hurst, Krag
5 November 2025; 19:00	1× (yellow card) 2× (suspension)	Report	3× (suspension)	Lipperlandhalle, Lemgo; Attendance: 3,995; Referees: Hurst, Krag

5 November 2025; 19:30	HSG Nordhorn-Lingen	27–28	SC DHfK Leipzig	Euregium, Nordhorn; Attendance: 1,947; Referees: Cesnik, Konrad
5 November 2025; 19:30	Marschall 7	(11–14)	Lönn 5	Euregium, Nordhorn; Attendance: 1,947; Referees: Cesnik, Konrad
5 November 2025; 19:30	1× (yellow card) 1× (suspension)	Report	1× (yellow card) 4× (suspension)	Euregium, Nordhorn; Attendance: 1,947; Referees: Cesnik, Konrad

5 November 2025; 19:30	TV Großwallstadt	27–45	SC Magdeburg	Untermainhalle, Elsenfeld; Attendance: 2,500; Referees: Köppl, Regner
5 November 2025; 19:30	Schalles 5	(11–23)	Weber 8	Untermainhalle, Elsenfeld; Attendance: 2,500; Referees: Köppl, Regner
5 November 2025; 19:30	2× (suspension)	Report	1× (suspension)	Untermainhalle, Elsenfeld; Attendance: 2,500; Referees: Köppl, Regner

5 November 2025; 20:00	TVB Stuttgart	29–36	SG Flensburg-Handewitt	Scharrena, Stuttgart; Attendance: 1,921; Referees: Kern, Kuschel
5 November 2025; 20:00	Häfner 13	(12–17)	Jakobsen 9	Scharrena, Stuttgart; Attendance: 1,921; Referees: Kern, Kuschel
5 November 2025; 20:00	1× (suspension)	Report	1× (yellow card) 4× (suspension)	Scharrena, Stuttgart; Attendance: 1,921; Referees: Kern, Kuschel

6 November 2025; 20:00	Füchse Berlin	38–22	ThSV Eisenach	Max-Schmeling-Halle, Berlin; Attendance: 3,796; Referees: vom Dorff, vom Dorff
6 November 2025; 20:00	Gidsel, Grøndahl 6	(22–12)	Joelsson 5	Max-Schmeling-Halle, Berlin; Attendance: 3,796; Referees: vom Dorff, vom Dorff
6 November 2025; 20:00	1× (yellow card) 2× (suspension)	Report	1× (yellow card) 4× (suspension) 1× (red card)	Max-Schmeling-Halle, Berlin; Attendance: 3,796; Referees: vom Dorff, vom Dorff

== Quarterfinals ==
The draw took place on 6 November 2025. The games were played between 17 and 18 December 2025.

17 December 2025; 19:00	SC DHfK Leipzig	27–35	TBV Lemgo	BallsportArena Dresden, Dresden; Attendance: 2,704; Referees: vom Dorff, vom Dorff
17 December 2025; 19:00	Krzikalla 6	(11–14)	Versteijnen 8	BallsportArena Dresden, Dresden; Attendance: 2,704; Referees: vom Dorff, vom Dorff
17 December 2025; 19:00	2× (suspension)	Report	3× (suspension)	BallsportArena Dresden, Dresden; Attendance: 2,704; Referees: vom Dorff, vom Dorff

18 December 2025; 19:00	Füchse Berlin	32–30	THW Kiel	Max-Schmeling-Halle, Berlin; Attendance: 8,525; Referees: Schulze, Tönnies
18 December 2025; 19:00	Gidsel 9	(16–17)	Zerbe 10	Max-Schmeling-Halle, Berlin; Attendance: 8,525; Referees: Schulze, Tönnies
18 December 2025; 19:00	1× (yellow card) 2× (suspension)	Report	1× (yellow card) 3× (suspension)	Max-Schmeling-Halle, Berlin; Attendance: 8,525; Referees: Schulze, Tönnies

18 December 2025; 19:00	Bergischer HC	30–23	MT Melsungen	Uni-Halle, Wuppertal; Attendance: 3,200; Referees: Hurst, Krag
18 December 2025; 19:00	Seesing 7	(12–9)	Kulesh 5	Uni-Halle, Wuppertal; Attendance: 3,200; Referees: Hurst, Krag
18 December 2025; 19:00	3× (suspension)	Report	1× (yellow card) 2× (suspension) 1× (red card)	Uni-Halle, Wuppertal; Attendance: 3,200; Referees: Hurst, Krag

18 December 2025; 19:30	SC Magdeburg	35–29	SG Flensburg-Handewitt	GETEC Arena, Magdeburg; Attendance: 6,600; Referees: Baumgart, Dinges
18 December 2025; 19:30	Magnússon 11	(18–14)	Pytlick 7	GETEC Arena, Magdeburg; Attendance: 6,600; Referees: Baumgart, Dinges
18 December 2025; 19:30	1× (suspension)	Report	1× (suspension)	GETEC Arena, Magdeburg; Attendance: 6,600; Referees: Baumgart, Dinges

== Final four ==
The draw took place on 18 December 2025. The games were played on 18 and 19 April 2026 at the Lanxess Arena, Cologne.

=== Bracket ===
Semi-finals
18 April
TBV Lemgo	36
Füchse Berlin	39
18 April
Bergischer HC (Pen)	27 (4)
SC Magdeburg	27 (3)

Final
19 April
Füchse Berlin	42
Bergischer HC	33
Third place
19 April
TBV Lemgo	35
SC Magdeburg	31

=== Semifinals ===
18 April 2026; 15:45	TBV Lemgo	36–39	Füchse Berlin	Lanxess Arena, Cologne; Attendance: 19,750; Referees: Baumgart, Dinges
18 April 2026; 15:45	Suton 8	(16–20)	Andersson 11	Lanxess Arena, Cologne; Attendance: 19,750; Referees: Baumgart, Dinges
18 April 2026; 15:45	3× (suspension)	Report	1× (yellow card) 2× (suspension)	Lanxess Arena, Cologne; Attendance: 19,750; Referees: Baumgart, Dinges

18 April 2026
18:45
Bergischer HC
27–27 (ET)
SC Magdeburg
Lanxess Arena, Cologne
Attendance: 19,750
Referees: Hurst, Krag
Beyer 7
(11–11)
Claar 8
2× (yellow card) 3× (suspension)
Report
1× (yellow card)

FT: 22–22 ET: 5–5 Pen: 4–3

=== Third place game ===
19 April 2026; 12:45	TBV Lemgo	35–31	SC Magdeburg	Lanxess Arena, Cologne; Attendance: 19,750; Referees: Köppl, Regner
19 April 2026; 12:45	Suton 8	(16–15)	Musche 6	Lanxess Arena, Cologne; Attendance: 19,750; Referees: Köppl, Regner
19 April 2026; 12:45	2× (suspension)	Report		Lanxess Arena, Cologne; Attendance: 19,750; Referees: Köppl, Regner

=== Final ===
19 April 2026; 15:45	Füchse Berlin	42–33	Bergischer HC	Lanxess Arena, Cologne; Attendance: 19,750; Referees: Thiyagarajah, Thiyagarajah
19 April 2026; 15:45	Andersson 10	(22–17)	Beyer, Hangstein 6	Lanxess Arena, Cologne; Attendance: 19,750; Referees: Thiyagarajah, Thiyagarajah
19 April 2026; 15:45	4× (suspension)	Report	4× (suspension)	Lanxess Arena, Cologne; Attendance: 19,750; Referees: Thiyagarajah, Thiyagarajah
