= 2023–24 DHB-Pokal =

DHB-Pokal
- 2023–24

Tournament information
- Sport: Handball
- Dates: 25 August 2023–14 April 2024
- Teams: 40
- Website: HBL

Final positions
- Champions: SC Magdeburg
- Runner-up: MT Melsungen

Tournament statistics
- Matches played: 44
- Goals scored: 2705 (61.48 per match)
- Attendance: 146,145 (3,321 per match)
- Top scorer(s): Mathias Gidsel (31 goals)

The 2023–24 DHB-Pokal was the 47th edition of the tournament.

SC Magdeburg won their third title by defeating MT Melsungen in the final.

== Format ==
In the first round the two relegated teams from the 2022–23 Handball-Bundesliga and eight other teams from the 2. Bunesliga joined 12 teams from the 3. Liga and amateur-cup. The teams were split into a north-and south group and face each other. In the third round, the other teams from the Bundesliga joined, except for the three best-placed teams from the last edition, those joined in the round of 16. The tournament came to an end with a final four in the Lanxess Arena in Cologne.

== Schedule ==
The rounds of the 2023–24 competition were scheduled as follows:

Round	Matches
First round	25–26 August 2023
Second round	12–20 September 2023
Third round	3–4 October 2023
Round of 16	12–13 December 2023
Quarterfinals	3–4 February 2024
Final four	13–14 April 2024

Times are UTC+2 (December and February games are UTC+1)

== First round ==
The draw took place on 3 July 2023. The games were played on 25 and 26 August 2023.

25 August 2023; 18:30	Eintracht Hildesheim	23–29	GWD Minden	Volksbank-Arena Hildesheim, Hildesheim; Attendance: 603; Referees: Krag, Hurst
25 August 2023; 18:30	Von Hermanni 11	(11–13)	Staar 6	Volksbank-Arena Hildesheim, Hildesheim; Attendance: 603; Referees: Krag, Hurst
25 August 2023; 18:30	1× (yellow card) 2× (suspension)	Report	1× (yellow card) 5× (suspension)	Volksbank-Arena Hildesheim, Hildesheim; Attendance: 603; Referees: Krag, Hurst

25 August 2023; 20:00	TV Emsdetten	29–34	1. VfL Potsdam	EMS-Halle, Emsdetten; Attendance: 1,050; Referees: Cesnik, Konrad
25 August 2023; 20:00	Terhaer 7	(16–18)	Sauter, Šimić 6	EMS-Halle, Emsdetten; Attendance: 1,050; Referees: Cesnik, Konrad
25 August 2023; 20:00	7× (suspension)	Report	4× (suspension)	EMS-Halle, Emsdetten; Attendance: 1,050; Referees: Cesnik, Konrad

25 August 2023; 20:15	HSG Hanau	19–40	ASV Hamm-Westfalen	Main-Kinzig-Halle, Hanau; Attendance: 277; Referees: Kolb, Kauth
25 August 2023; 20:15	Bergold 4	(9–21)	Zintel 7	Main-Kinzig-Halle, Hanau; Attendance: 277; Referees: Kolb, Kauth
25 August 2023; 20:15	4× (suspension)	Report	1× (yellow card) 4× (suspension)	Main-Kinzig-Halle, Hanau; Attendance: 277; Referees: Kolb, Kauth

26 August 2023; 18:00	EHV Aue	30–33	SG BBM Bietigheim	Erzgebirgshalle, Lößnitz; Attendance: 608; Referees: Standke, Heine
26 August 2023; 18:00	Peter 8	(18–16)	Wolf 8	Erzgebirgshalle, Lößnitz; Attendance: 608; Referees: Standke, Heine
26 August 2023; 18:00	2× (suspension)	Report	3× (suspension)	Erzgebirgshalle, Lößnitz; Attendance: 608; Referees: Standke, Heine

26 August 2023; 19:30	TV Gelnhausen	26–40	HSC 2000 Coburg	Rudi-Lechleidner-Halle, Gelnhausen; Attendance: 540; Referees: Schmack, Dinges
26 August 2023; 19:30	Malolepszy 8	(14–20)	Billek 10	Rudi-Lechleidner-Halle, Gelnhausen; Attendance: 540; Referees: Schmack, Dinges
26 August 2023; 19:30	5× (suspension)	Report	4× (suspension) 1× (red card)	Rudi-Lechleidner-Halle, Gelnhausen; Attendance: 540; Referees: Schmack, Dinges

26 August 2023; 20:00	TuS Vinnhorst	30–35	HSG Nordhorn-Lingen	Sporthalle Vinnhorst, Hanover; Attendance: 421; Referees: Kinzel, Grobe
26 August 2023; 20:00	Siegler 5	(14–16)	Lux 11	Sporthalle Vinnhorst, Hanover; Attendance: 421; Referees: Kinzel, Grobe
26 August 2023; 20:00	1× (yellow card) 3× (suspension)	Report	4× (suspension)	Sporthalle Vinnhorst, Hanover; Attendance: 421; Referees: Kinzel, Grobe

== Second round ==
The draw took place on 29 August 2023. The games were played between 12 and 20 September 2023.

12 September 2023; 19:30	TuS Ferndorf	26–41	SG BBM Bietigheim	Sporthalle Stählerwiese, Kreuztal; Attendance: 583; Referees: Hartmann, Hennekes
12 September 2023; 19:30	Mundus 8	(12–18)	Bader, Wolf 9	Sporthalle Stählerwiese, Kreuztal; Attendance: 583; Referees: Hartmann, Hennekes
12 September 2023; 19:30	2× (yellow card) 6× (suspension) 1× (red card)	Report	2× (yellow card) 2× (suspension)	Sporthalle Stählerwiese, Kreuztal; Attendance: 583; Referees: Hartmann, Hennekes

13 September 2023; 19:00	HSG Krefeld	37–40	HSG Nordhorn-Lingen	Glockenspitz-Sporthalle, Krefeld; Attendance: 379; Referees: Engeln, Schmitz
13 September 2023; 19:00	Hüller 7	(18–16)	Lux 12	Glockenspitz-Sporthalle, Krefeld; Attendance: 379; Referees: Engeln, Schmitz
13 September 2023; 19:00	6× (suspension)	Report	2× (yellow card) 5× (suspension)	Glockenspitz-Sporthalle, Krefeld; Attendance: 379; Referees: Engeln, Schmitz

13 September 2023; 20:00	MTV Braunschweig	24–32	Dessau-Roßlauer HV	Sporthalle Alte Waage, Braunschweig; Attendance: 400; Referees: Kittel, Scharfe
13 September 2023; 20:00	three players 5	(14–16)	Haake 7	Sporthalle Alte Waage, Braunschweig; Attendance: 400; Referees: Kittel, Scharfe
13 September 2023; 20:00	1× (yellow card) 4× (suspension) 1× (red card)	Report	1× (yellow card) 6× (suspension)	Sporthalle Alte Waage, Braunschweig; Attendance: 400; Referees: Kittel, Scharfe

13 September 2023; 20:00	TuS Fürstenfeldbruck	29–40	HSC 2000 Coburg	Wittelsbacher-Halle, Fürstenfeldbruck; Attendance: 450; Referees: Kauth, Kolb
13 September 2023; 20:00	Link 7	(10–17)	Fuß, Valkovskis 6	Wittelsbacher-Halle, Fürstenfeldbruck; Attendance: 450; Referees: Kauth, Kolb
13 September 2023; 20:00	1× (yellow card) 5× (suspension) 1× (red card)	Report	1× (yellow card) 3× (suspension)	Wittelsbacher-Halle, Fürstenfeldbruck; Attendance: 450; Referees: Kauth, Kolb

18 September 2023
19:15
ASV Hamm-Westfalen
50–49 (ET)
1. VfL Potsdam
Westpress Arena, Hamm
Attendance: 460
Referees: Bona, Frank
three players 8
(23–20)
Sauter 16
1× (yellow card) 3× (suspension)
Report
1× (yellow card) 6× (suspension)

FT: 39–39 ET: 10–9

19 September 2023; 19:00	Bergische Panther	22–31	VfL Lübeck-Schwartau	Sporthalle Schwanen, Wermelskirchen; Attendance: 201; Referees: Foerster, Foerster
19 September 2023; 19:00	Kämper 5	(10–15)	Löfström 6	Sporthalle Schwanen, Wermelskirchen; Attendance: 201; Referees: Foerster, Foerster
19 September 2023; 19:00	1× (yellow card) 4× (suspension)	Report	5× (suspension)	Sporthalle Schwanen, Wermelskirchen; Attendance: 201; Referees: Foerster, Foerster

19 September 2023; 19:00	HC Oppenweiler/Backnang	24–33	TUSEM Essen	Gemeindehalle, Oppenweiler; Attendance: 172; Referees: Jaros, Thrun
19 September 2023; 19:00	Goller, Newel 5	(15–17)	Rose 6	Gemeindehalle, Oppenweiler; Attendance: 172; Referees: Jaros, Thrun
19 September 2023; 19:00	1× (yellow card) 2× (suspension)	Report	5× (suspension)	Gemeindehalle, Oppenweiler; Attendance: 172; Referees: Jaros, Thrun

19 September 2023; 19:30	TuS Nettelstedt-Lübbecke	28–24	GWD Minden	Merkur Arena, Lübbecke; Attendance: 1,990; Referees: Fedtke, Wienrich
19 September 2023; 19:30	Hangstein 9	(14–10)	Darmoul 11	Merkur Arena, Lübbecke; Attendance: 1,990; Referees: Fedtke, Wienrich
19 September 2023; 19:30	3× (suspension)	Report	7× (suspension) 1× (red card)	Merkur Arena, Lübbecke; Attendance: 1,990; Referees: Fedtke, Wienrich

20 September 2023
19:00
TSG Friesenheim
31–32 (ET)
VfL Eintracht Hagen
Sportzentrum TV Hochdorf, Hochdorf-Assenheim
Attendance: 352
Referees: Hehn, Mayer
Raguse 7
(13–15)
Gaubatz 10
1× (yellow card) 5× (suspension)
Report
2× (suspension)

FT: 28–28 ET: 3–4

== Third round ==
The draw took place on 29 August 2023. The games were played on 3 and 4 October 2023.

3 October 2023; 15:00	THW Kiel	31–32	HSG Wetzlar	Sparkassen-Arena, Kiel; Attendance: 4,389; Referees: Fedtke, Wienrich
3 October 2023; 15:00	Johansson 7	(17–19)	Novak 10	Sparkassen-Arena, Kiel; Attendance: 4,389; Referees: Fedtke, Wienrich
3 October 2023; 15:00	2× (suspension)	Report	1× (yellow card) 6× (suspension)	Sparkassen-Arena, Kiel; Attendance: 4,389; Referees: Fedtke, Wienrich

3 October 2023; 16:00	interaktiv.Handball Ratingen	27–44	VfL Gummersbach	Sporthalle Gothaer Straße, Ratingen; Attendance: 800; Referees: Bona, Frank
3 October 2023; 16:00	Oelze 7	(10–23)	Kodrin 14	Sporthalle Gothaer Straße, Ratingen; Attendance: 800; Referees: Bona, Frank
3 October 2023; 16:00	1× (yellow card) 3× (suspension)	Report	1× (yellow card) 1× (suspension)	Sporthalle Gothaer Straße, Ratingen; Attendance: 800; Referees: Bona, Frank

3 October 2023
16:30
HC Erlangen
35–38 (ET)
Füchse Berlin
Tectake Arena, Würzburg
Attendance: 2,900
Referees: Otto, Piper
Steinert 10
(13–16)
Gidsel, Tollbring 10
3× (suspension)
Report
1× (yellow card) 3× (suspension)

FT: 30–30 ET: 5–8

3 October 2023; 17:00	ASV Hamm-Westfalen	35–36	HSV Hamburg	Westpress Arena, Hamm; Attendance: 1,687; Referees: Cesnik, Konrad
3 October 2023; 17:00	Huesmann 7	(18–18)	Lassen 10	Westpress Arena, Hamm; Attendance: 1,687; Referees: Cesnik, Konrad
3 October 2023; 17:00	1× (yellow card) 6× (suspension) 1× (red card)	Report	7× (suspension)	Westpress Arena, Hamm; Attendance: 1,687; Referees: Cesnik, Konrad

3 October 2023; 17:00	TuS Nettelstedt-Lübbecke	29–27	HBW Balingen-Weilstetten	Merkur Arena, Lübbecke; Attendance: 876; Referees: vom Dorff, vom Dorff
3 October 2023; 17:00	Skroblien 9	(16–12)	Müller 5	Merkur Arena, Lübbecke; Attendance: 876; Referees: vom Dorff, vom Dorff
3 October 2023; 17:00	1× (yellow card) 4× (suspension)	Report	2× (yellow card) 2× (suspension)	Merkur Arena, Lübbecke; Attendance: 876; Referees: vom Dorff, vom Dorff

3 October 2023; 17:00	HC Gelpe/Strombach	27–37	TUSEM Essen	Sporthalle Gesamtschule Derschlag, Gummersbach; Attendance: 320; Referees: Janz, Sug
3 October 2023; 17:00	Meyer 8	(17–20)	Eißing 7	Sporthalle Gesamtschule Derschlag, Gummersbach; Attendance: 320; Referees: Janz, Sug
3 October 2023; 17:00	5× (suspension)	Report	1× (yellow card)	Sporthalle Gesamtschule Derschlag, Gummersbach; Attendance: 320; Referees: Janz, Sug

3 October 2023; 18:00	Dessau-Roßlauer HV	28–31	MT Melsungen	Anhalt Arena, Dessau; Attendance: 1,927; Referees: Kauth, Kolb
3 October 2023; 18:00	Löser 7	(17–12)	Krištopāns 7	Anhalt Arena, Dessau; Attendance: 1,927; Referees: Kauth, Kolb
3 October 2023; 18:00	2× (suspension)	Report	2× (suspension)	Anhalt Arena, Dessau; Attendance: 1,927; Referees: Kauth, Kolb

3 October 2023; 18:00	VfL Lübeck-Schwartau	25–33	SC DHfK Leipzig	Hansehalle, Lübeck; Attendance: 1,216; Referees: Hannes, Hannes
3 October 2023; 18:00	Patzel 5	(17–19)	Rúnarsson 7	Hansehalle, Lübeck; Attendance: 1,216; Referees: Hannes, Hannes
3 October 2023; 18:00	1× (yellow card) 2× (suspension)	Report	1× (yellow card) 2× (suspension)	Hansehalle, Lübeck; Attendance: 1,216; Referees: Hannes, Hannes

3 October 2023; 18:00	VfL Eintracht Hagen	25–23	HSC 2000 Coburg	Ischelandhalle, Hagen; Attendance: 615; Referees: Köppl, Regner
3 October 2023; 18:00	Buergin 6	(13–10)	Krone 6	Ischelandhalle, Hagen; Attendance: 615; Referees: Köppl, Regner
3 October 2023; 18:00	1× (yellow card) 5× (suspension)	Report	1× (yellow card) 4× (suspension) 1× (red card)	Ischelandhalle, Hagen; Attendance: 615; Referees: Köppl, Regner

4 October 2023; 19:00	TBV Lemgo	25–31	Frisch Auf Göppingen	Lipperlandhalle, Lemgo; Attendance: 2,928; Referees: Kuttler, Merz
4 October 2023; 19:00	Schagen, Zehnder 5	(12–15)	Schiller 6	Lipperlandhalle, Lemgo; Attendance: 2,928; Referees: Kuttler, Merz
4 October 2023; 19:00	1× (yellow card) 3× (suspension)	Report	1× (yellow card) 2× (suspension)	Lipperlandhalle, Lemgo; Attendance: 2,928; Referees: Kuttler, Merz

4 October 2023; 19:00	TV Bittenfeld	25–26	ThSV Eisenach	Scharrena Stuttgart, Stuttgart; Attendance: 628; Referees: Hellbusch, Jansen
4 October 2023; 19:00	Häfner, Serrano Villalobos 5	(11–13)	Zehnder 10	Scharrena Stuttgart, Stuttgart; Attendance: 628; Referees: Hellbusch, Jansen
4 October 2023; 19:00	3× (suspension)	Report	4× (suspension) 1× (red card)	Scharrena Stuttgart, Stuttgart; Attendance: 628; Referees: Hellbusch, Jansen

4 October 2023; 19:30	HSG Nordhorn-Lingen	27–35	Bergischer HC	Euregium, Nordhorn; Attendance: 1,648; Referees: Heine, Standke
4 October 2023; 19:30	Marschall, Pöhle 5	(12–19)	Beyer 9	Euregium, Nordhorn; Attendance: 1,648; Referees: Heine, Standke
4 October 2023; 19:30	4× (suspension)	Report	1× (yellow card) 3× (suspension)	Euregium, Nordhorn; Attendance: 1,648; Referees: Heine, Standke

4 October 2023; 19:30	SG BBM Bietigheim	31–29	TSV Hannover-Burgdorf	Sporthalle am Viadukt, Bietigheim-Bissingen; Attendance: 706; Referees: Kern, Kuschel
4 October 2023; 19:30	Bader 8	(12–12)	Steinhauser 7	Sporthalle am Viadukt, Bietigheim-Bissingen; Attendance: 706; Referees: Kern, Kuschel
4 October 2023; 19:30	1× (yellow card) 2× (suspension)	Report	1× (yellow card) 2× (suspension)	Sporthalle am Viadukt, Bietigheim-Bissingen; Attendance: 706; Referees: Kern, Kuschel

== Round of 16 ==
The draw took place on 9 October 2023. The games were played on 12 and 13 December 2023.

12 December 2023; 19:00	HSV Hamburg	31–28	ThSV Eisenach	Alsterdorfer Sporthalle, Hamburg; Attendance: 1,378; Referees: Grobe, Kinzel
12 December 2023; 19:00	Baijens, Mortensen 8	(14–16)	Zehnder 8	Alsterdorfer Sporthalle, Hamburg; Attendance: 1,378; Referees: Grobe, Kinzel
12 December 2023; 19:00	4× (suspension)	Report	1× (yellow card) 2× (suspension)	Alsterdorfer Sporthalle, Hamburg; Attendance: 1,378; Referees: Grobe, Kinzel

12 December 2023; 19:30	SG BBM Bietigheim	33–42	Füchse Berlin	EgeTrans Arena, Bietigheim-Bissingen; Attendance: 3,024; Referees: Brodbeck, Reich
12 December 2023; 19:30	Wiederstein 5	(16–19)	Gidsel 11	EgeTrans Arena, Bietigheim-Bissingen; Attendance: 3,024; Referees: Brodbeck, Reich
12 December 2023; 19:30	1× (yellow card) 1× (suspension)	Report	1× (suspension)	EgeTrans Arena, Bietigheim-Bissingen; Attendance: 3,024; Referees: Brodbeck, Reich

12 December 2023; 20:00	SC DHfK Leipzig	21–27	MT Melsungen	Arena Leipzig, Leipzig; Attendance: 3,831; Referees: Schulze, Tönnies
12 December 2023; 20:00	Semper, Sunnefeldt 5	(12–14)	Martinović 7	Arena Leipzig, Leipzig; Attendance: 3,831; Referees: Schulze, Tönnies
12 December 2023; 20:00	3× (suspension)	Report	3× (suspension)	Arena Leipzig, Leipzig; Attendance: 3,831; Referees: Schulze, Tönnies

13 December 2023; 19:00	SC Magdeburg	39–31	HSG Wetzlar	GETEC Arena, Magdeburg; Attendance: 5,429; Referees: Blümel, Loppaschewski
13 December 2023; 19:00	Magnússon 10	(21–15)	four players 4	GETEC Arena, Magdeburg; Attendance: 5,429; Referees: Blümel, Loppaschewski
13 December 2023; 19:00	2× (suspension)	Report	4× (suspension)	GETEC Arena, Magdeburg; Attendance: 5,429; Referees: Blümel, Loppaschewski

13 December 2023; 19:00	VfL Eintracht Hagen	28–36	TuS Nettelstedt-Lübbecke	Ischelandhalle, Hagen; Attendance: 1,302; Referees: Hannes, Hannes
13 December 2023; 19:00	Busch 9	(12–19)	Dräger 7	Ischelandhalle, Hagen; Attendance: 1,302; Referees: Hannes, Hannes
13 December 2023; 19:00		Report	3× (suspension)	Ischelandhalle, Hagen; Attendance: 1,302; Referees: Hannes, Hannes

13 December 2023; 19:00	TUSEM Essen	24–33	Rhein-Neckar Löwen	Sportpark am Hallo, Essen; Attendance: 2,578; Referees: Otto, Piper
13 December 2023; 19:00	Werschkull 5	(13–18)	Kohlbacher, Zacharias 6	Sportpark am Hallo, Essen; Attendance: 2,578; Referees: Otto, Piper
13 December 2023; 19:00	1× (yellow card) 3× (suspension)	Report	2× (suspension)	Sportpark am Hallo, Essen; Attendance: 2,578; Referees: Otto, Piper

13 December 2023; 19:30	VfL Gummersbach	33–28	Frisch Auf Göppingen	Schwalbe-Arena, Gummersbach; Attendance: 3,132; Referees: Hellbusch, Jansen
13 December 2023; 19:30	Vujović 12	(18–13)	Šarac 9	Schwalbe-Arena, Gummersbach; Attendance: 3,132; Referees: Hellbusch, Jansen
13 December 2023; 19:30	2× (suspension)	Report	7× (suspension)	Schwalbe-Arena, Gummersbach; Attendance: 3,132; Referees: Hellbusch, Jansen

13 December 2023; 19:30	SG Flensburg-Handewitt	37–29	Bergischer HC	Flens-Arena, Flensburg; Attendance: 4,131; Referees: Heine, Standke
13 December 2023; 19:30	Jakobsen, Hansen 6	(18–15)	Maldonado 6	Flens-Arena, Flensburg; Attendance: 4,131; Referees: Heine, Standke
13 December 2023; 19:30	2× (suspension)	Report	3× (suspension)	Flens-Arena, Flensburg; Attendance: 4,131; Referees: Heine, Standke

== Quarterfinals ==
The draw took place on 14 December 2023. The games were played on 3 and 4 February 2024.

3 February 2024; 19:00	TuS Nettelstedt-Lübbecke	28–30	MT Melsungen	Merkur Arena, Lübbecke; Attendance: 2,356; Referees: Schulze, Tönnies
3 February 2024; 19:00	Genz 7	(13–16)	Jónsson 10	Merkur Arena, Lübbecke; Attendance: 2,356; Referees: Schulze, Tönnies
3 February 2024; 19:00	2× (suspension)	Report	4× (suspension)	Merkur Arena, Lübbecke; Attendance: 2,356; Referees: Schulze, Tönnies

3 February 2024; 20:00	HSV Hamburg	25–37	SG Flensburg-Handewitt	Alsterdorfer Sporthalle, Hamburg; Attendance: 3,800; Referees: Hannes, Hannes
3 February 2024; 20:00	Baijens 9	(11–14)	Pytlick 9	Alsterdorfer Sporthalle, Hamburg; Attendance: 3,800; Referees: Hannes, Hannes
3 February 2024; 20:00	1× (suspension)	Report	1× (yellow card) 3× (suspension)	Alsterdorfer Sporthalle, Hamburg; Attendance: 3,800; Referees: Hannes, Hannes

4 February 2024; 16:30	Füchse Berlin	31–29	VfL Gummersbach	Max-Schmeling-Halle, Berlin; Attendance: 7,715; Referees: Grobe, Kinze
4 February 2024; 16:30	Gidsel 9	(16–13)	Mappes 8	Max-Schmeling-Halle, Berlin; Attendance: 7,715; Referees: Grobe, Kinze
4 February 2024; 16:30	2× (suspension)	Report	3× (suspension)	Max-Schmeling-Halle, Berlin; Attendance: 7,715; Referees: Grobe, Kinze

4 February 2024; 18:00	SC Magdeburg	34–24	Rhein-Neckar Löwen	GETEC Arena, Magdeburg; Attendance: 6,600; Referees: vom Dorff, vom Dorff
4 February 2024; 18:00	Magnússon 8	(18–14)	Reichmann 7	GETEC Arena, Magdeburg; Attendance: 6,600; Referees: vom Dorff, vom Dorff
4 February 2024; 18:00	1× (yellow card) 1× (suspension)	Report	1× (suspension)	GETEC Arena, Magdeburg; Attendance: 6,600; Referees: vom Dorff, vom Dorff

== Final four ==
The draw took place on 6 February 2024. The games were played on 13 and 14 April 2024 at the Lanxess Arena, Cologne.

=== Bracket ===
Semi-finals
13 April
SC Magdeburg	30
Füchse Berlin	25
13 April
SG Flensburg-Handewitt	28
MT Melsungen	33

Final
14 April
SC Magdeburg	30
MT Melsungen	19
Third place
14 April
Füchse Berlin	28
SG Flensburg-Handewitt	31

=== Semifinals ===
13 April 2024; 16:10	SC Magdeburg	30–25	Füchse Berlin	Lanxess Arena, Cologne; Attendance: 19,750; Referees: Thiyagarajah, Thiyagarajah
13 April 2024; 16:10	Kristjánsson 8	(14–10)	Andersson 9	Lanxess Arena, Cologne; Attendance: 19,750; Referees: Thiyagarajah, Thiyagarajah
13 April 2024; 16:10	2× (suspension)	Report	1× (yellow card) 1× (suspension)	Lanxess Arena, Cologne; Attendance: 19,750; Referees: Thiyagarajah, Thiyagarajah

13 April 2024; 19:00	SG Flensburg-Handewitt	28–33	MT Melsungen	Lanxess Arena, Cologne; Attendance: 19,750; Referees: Schulze, Tönnies
13 April 2024; 19:00	Jakobsen 9	(11–16)	Kastening 7	Lanxess Arena, Cologne; Attendance: 19,750; Referees: Schulze, Tönnies
13 April 2024; 19:00	1× (yellow card) 2× (suspension)	Report	5× (suspension)	Lanxess Arena, Cologne; Attendance: 19,750; Referees: Schulze, Tönnies

=== Third place game ===
14 April 2024; 12:45	Füchse Berlin	28–31	SG Flensburg-Handewitt	Lanxess Arena, Cologne; Attendance: 19,750; Referees: vom Dorff, vom Dorff
14 April 2024; 12:45	Andersson 7	(19–15)	Pytlick 7	Lanxess Arena, Cologne; Attendance: 19,750; Referees: vom Dorff, vom Dorff
14 April 2024; 12:45	3× (suspension)	Report	2× (suspension)	Lanxess Arena, Cologne; Attendance: 19,750; Referees: vom Dorff, vom Dorff

=== Final ===
14 April 2024; 15:35	SC Magdeburg	30–19	MT Melsungen	Lanxess Arena, Cologne; Attendance: 19,750; Referees: Brodbeck, Reich
14 April 2024; 15:35	Mertens 7	(13–11)	Kastening 5	Lanxess Arena, Cologne; Attendance: 19,750; Referees: Brodbeck, Reich
14 April 2024; 15:35	2× (yellow card) 2× (suspension)	Report	3× (suspension)	Lanxess Arena, Cologne; Attendance: 19,750; Referees: Brodbeck, Reich
