= Patrick Wiencek =

German handball player (born 1989)

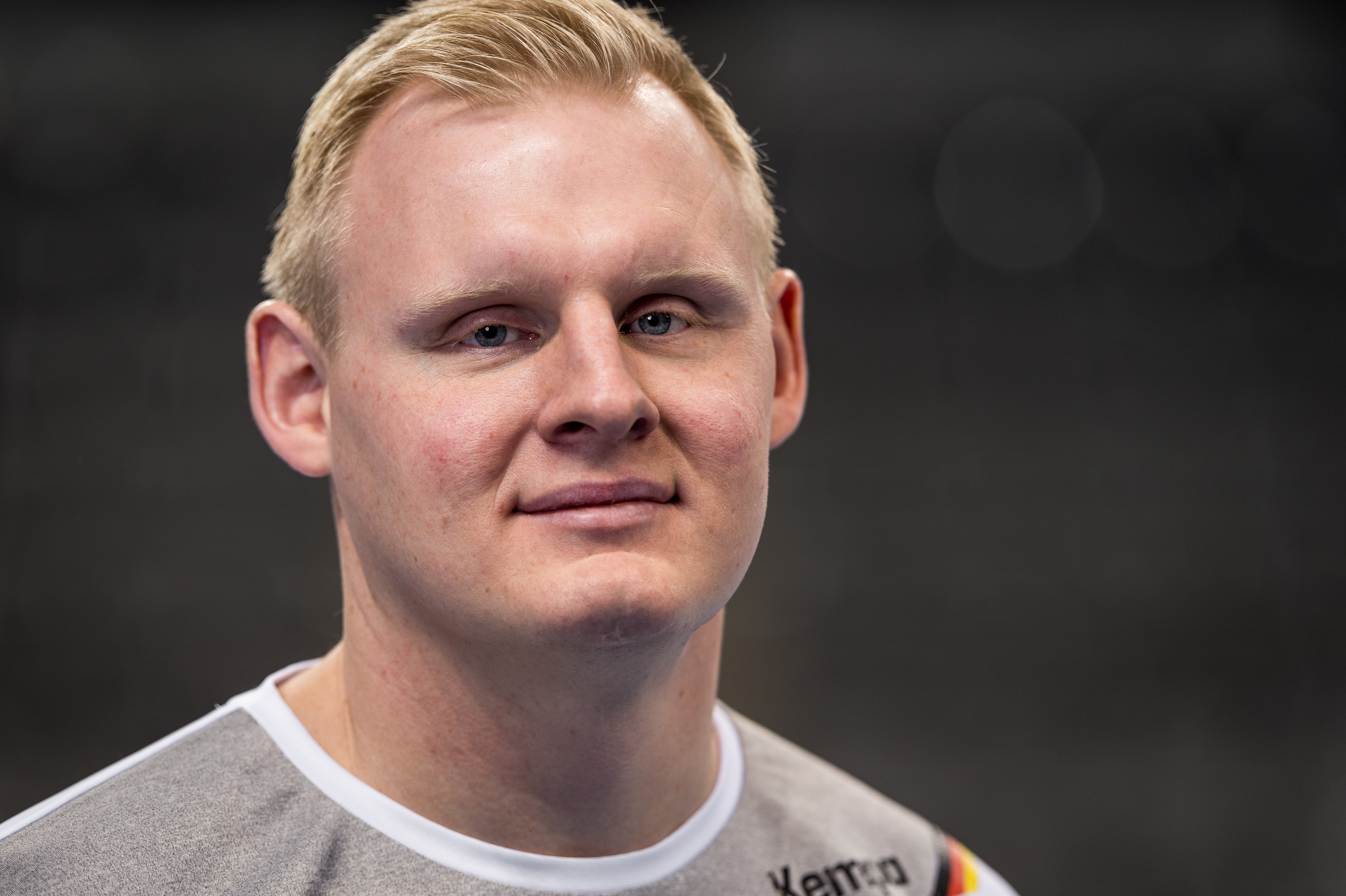
- Wiencek with Germany in 2018

Personal information
- Nationality: German
- Born: 22 March 1989 (age 37) Duisburg, West Germany
- Height: 2.01 m (6 ft 7 in)

Sport
- Sport: Handball
- Position: Pivot
- Current club: THW Kiel
- Number: 17

Senior clubs
- Years: Team
- –2006: MSV Duisburg
- 2006–2007: HSG Düsseldorf
- 2007–2008: Bergischer HC
- 2008–2010: TUSEM Essen
- 2010–2012: VfL Gummersbach
- 2012–: THW Kiel
National team
Years	Team	Apps	(Gls)
2009–2022	Germany	159	(316)
Medal record
Olympic Games
Bronze medal – third place	2016 Rio de Janeiro	Team

Patrick Wiencek (born 22 March 1989) is a German professional handballer playing for THW Kiel.

He retired from international duty in March 2022.

== Achievements ==
- EHF Champions League:
  - Gold: 2020
- EHF Cup:
  - Gold: 2019
- EHF Cup Winners' Cup:
  - Gold: 2011
- Handball-Bundesliga:
  - Gold: 2013, 2014, 2015, 2020, 2021, 2023
- DHB-Pokal
  - Gold: 2013, 2017, 2019, 2022, 2025
- DHB-Supercup:
  - Gold: 2012, 2014, 2015, 2020, 2021, 2022, 2023
