= 2024–25 DHB-Pokal =

DHB-Pokal
- 2024–25

Tournament information
- Sport: Handball
- Dates: 24 August 2024–13 April 2025
- Teams: 40
- Website: HBL

Final positions
- Champions: THW Kiel
- Runner-up: MT Melsungen

Tournament statistics
- Matches played: 40
- Goals scored: 2408 (60.2 per match)

The 2024–25 DHB-Pokal was the 48th edition of the tournament.

THW Kiel won their 13th title with a win over MT Melsungen.

== Format ==
In the first round eleven teams from 2. Bunesliga and 3. Liga played against each other. The teams were split into a north-and south group. In the second round, the teams from the Bundesliga join, except for the three best-placed teams from the last edition, those joined in the round of 16. The tournament came to an end with a final four in the Lanxess Arena in Cologne.

== Schedule ==
The rounds of the 2024–25 competition were scheduled as follows:

| Round | Matches |
|---|---|
| First round | 21–25 August 2024 |
| Second round | 2–3 October 2024 |
| Round of 16 | 13–14 November 2024 |
| Quarterfinals | 19–20 December 2024 |
| Final four | 12–13 April 2025 |

Times are UTC+2 (November and December games are UTC+1)

== First round ==
The draw took place on 27 June 2024. The games were played between 21 and 25 August 2024.

| 21 August 2024; 20:00 | MTV Braunschweig | 25–29 | HSG Nordhorn-Lingen | Sporthalle Alte Waage, Braunschweig; Attendance: 400; Referees: Müller, Müller |
| 21 August 2024; 20:00 | Mudrow 11 | (9–16) | Jaeger 8 | Sporthalle Alte Waage, Braunschweig; Attendance: 400; Referees: Müller, Müller |
| 21 August 2024; 20:00 | 2× (yellow card) 1× (suspension) | Report | 1× (yellow card) 1× (suspension) 1× (red card) | Sporthalle Alte Waage, Braunschweig; Attendance: 400; Referees: Müller, Müller |

| 23 August 2024; 19:00 | HC Empor Rostock | 28–25 | 1. VfL Potsdam | Fiete-Reder-Halle, Rostock; Referees: Standke, Heine |
| 23 August 2024; 19:00 | Gansau, Meuser 6 | (14–12) | Akakpo, Klein 5 | Fiete-Reder-Halle, Rostock; Referees: Standke, Heine |
| 23 August 2024; 19:00 | 1× (yellow card) 6× (suspension) 1× (red card) | Report | 1× (yellow card) 5× (suspension) | Fiete-Reder-Halle, Rostock; Referees: Standke, Heine |

| 24 August 2024; 19:00 | ASV Hamm-Westfalen | 33–27 | TV Emsdetten | Westpress Arena, Hamm; Referees: Standke, Heine |
| 24 August 2024; 19:00 | Dayan, Huesmann 7 | (16–12) | Esche 6 | Westpress Arena, Hamm; Referees: Standke, Heine |
| 24 August 2024; 19:00 | 1× (yellow card) 5× (suspension) | Report | 1× (yellow card) 5× (suspension) | Westpress Arena, Hamm; Referees: Standke, Heine |

| 24 August 2024; 19:00 | HSG Krefeld | 26–29 | TUSEM Essen | Glockenspitz Sporthalle, Krefeld; Referees: Halbach, Halbach |
| 24 August 2024; 19:00 | Persson 5 | (14–13) | Göttler 5 | Glockenspitz Sporthalle, Krefeld; Referees: Halbach, Halbach |
| 24 August 2024; 19:00 | 2× (yellow card) 1× (suspension) | Report | 2× (suspension) | Glockenspitz Sporthalle, Krefeld; Referees: Halbach, Halbach |

| 24 August 2024; 19:00 | TuS Ferndorf | 31–35 | HSC 2000 Coburg | Sporthalle Stählerwiese, Kreuztal; Referees: Zollitsch, Volkening |
| 24 August 2024; 19:00 | Kević 8 | (12–14) | Fuß 10 | Sporthalle Stählerwiese, Kreuztal; Referees: Zollitsch, Volkening |
| 24 August 2024; 19:00 | 1× (yellow card) 4× (suspension) | Report | 2× (suspension) 1× (red card) | Sporthalle Stählerwiese, Kreuztal; Referees: Zollitsch, Volkening |

| 24 August 2024; 20:00 | HSG Konstanz | 30–35 | HC Elbflorenz 2006 | Riesenberg Sporthalle, Allensbach; Referees: Struder, Kijowsky |
| 24 August 2024; 20:00 | Erifopoulos 7 | (14–13) | Pehlivan 5 | Riesenberg Sporthalle, Allensbach; Referees: Struder, Kijowsky |
| 24 August 2024; 20:00 | 1× (yellow card) 3× (suspension) | Report | 4× (suspension) | Riesenberg Sporthalle, Allensbach; Referees: Struder, Kijowsky |

| 24 August 2024; 20:00 | SG Leutershausen | 29–43 | VfL Eintracht Hagen | Heinrich Beck Halle, Leutershausen; Referees: Seidler, Seidler |
| 24 August 2024; 20:00 | Mastrocola, Weindl 5 | (12–13) | Busch, Richter 6 | Heinrich Beck Halle, Leutershausen; Referees: Seidler, Seidler |
| 24 August 2024; 20:00 | 3× (suspension) | Report | 1× (yellow card) 1× (suspension) | Heinrich Beck Halle, Leutershausen; Referees: Seidler, Seidler |

| 24 August 2024; 20:00 | HC Oppenweiler/Backnang | 20–32 | TSG Friesenheim | Gemeindehalle, Oppenweiler; Referees: Thrun, Jaros |
| 24 August 2024; 20:00 | Fröhlich 5 | (9–16) | Schwarzer 6 | Gemeindehalle, Oppenweiler; Referees: Thrun, Jaros |
| 24 August 2024; 20:00 | 2× (yellow card) 6× (suspension) | Report | 2× (yellow card) 2× (suspension) | Gemeindehalle, Oppenweiler; Referees: Thrun, Jaros |

| 25 August 2024; 16:30 | HSG Rodgau Nieder-Roden | 19–24 | SG BBM Bietigheim | Sporthalle Nieder-Roden, Rodgau; Referees: Barmann, Barmann |
| 25 August 2024; 16:30 | Stenger 5 | (10–8) | Claus 6 | Sporthalle Nieder-Roden, Rodgau; Referees: Barmann, Barmann |
| 25 August 2024; 16:30 | 3× (yellow card) 1× (suspension) | Report | 1× (yellow card) | Sporthalle Nieder-Roden, Rodgau; Referees: Barmann, Barmann |

| 25 August 2024; 17:00 | Eintracht Hildesheim | 26–39 | VfL Lübeck-Schwartau | Volksbank Arena, Hildesheim; Attendance: 561; Referees: Kern, Kuschel |
| 25 August 2024; 17:00 | Wäger 7 | (12–20) | Refsgaard 6 | Volksbank Arena, Hildesheim; Attendance: 561; Referees: Kern, Kuschel |
| 25 August 2024; 17:00 | 2× (yellow card) | Report | 5× (yellow card) | Volksbank Arena, Hildesheim; Attendance: 561; Referees: Kern, Kuschel |

| 25 August 2024; 17:00 | Wilhelmshavener HV | 37–40 | TuS Nettelstedt-Lübbecke | Nordfrost-Arena, Wilhelmshaven; Attendance: 458; Referees: Gimmler, Rips |
| 25 August 2024; 17:00 | Schweigart 9 | (19–17) | Genz 7 | Nordfrost-Arena, Wilhelmshaven; Attendance: 458; Referees: Gimmler, Rips |
| 25 August 2024; 17:00 | 6× (yellow card) 1× (suspension) | Report | 4× (yellow card) | Nordfrost-Arena, Wilhelmshaven; Attendance: 458; Referees: Gimmler, Rips |

== Second round ==
The draw took place on 31 August 2024. The games were played on 2 and 3 October 2024.

2 October 2024
19:00
VfL Lübeck-Schwartau
33–36 (ET)
TSV Hannover-Burgdorf
Hansehalle, Lübeck
Referees: Schulze, Tönnies

(19–15)

Report

FT: 11–15 ET: 3–6

| 2 October 2024; 19:00 | TSG Friesenheim | 17–30 | TBV Lemgo | Friedrich-Ebert-Halle, Ludwigshafen; Referees: Hellbusch, Jansen |
| 2 October 2024; 19:00 | Schwarzer 4 | (9–13) | Carstensen 8 | Friedrich-Ebert-Halle, Ludwigshafen; Referees: Hellbusch, Jansen |
| 2 October 2024; 19:00 | 1× (yellow card) 4× (suspension) | Report | 1× (yellow card) 4× (suspension) | Friedrich-Ebert-Halle, Ludwigshafen; Referees: Hellbusch, Jansen |

| 2 October 2024; 19:00 | HC Elbflorenz | 32–36 | Bergischer HC | BallsportARENA, Dresden; Referees: Fedtke, Wienrich |
| 2 October 2024; 19:00 | Seidler 7 | (16–17) | Beyer 12 | BallsportARENA, Dresden; Referees: Fedtke, Wienrich |
| 2 October 2024; 19:00 | 1× (yellow card) 5× (suspension) | Report | 2× (suspension) | BallsportARENA, Dresden; Referees: Fedtke, Wienrich |

| 2 October 2024; 19:00 | Füchse Berlin | 37–36 | Frisch Auf Göppingen | Max-Schmeling-Halle, Berlin; Referees: Heine, Standke |
| 2 October 2024; 19:00 | Gidsel 10 | (20–17) | Hallbäck 9 | Max-Schmeling-Halle, Berlin; Referees: Heine, Standke |
| 2 October 2024; 19:00 | 5× (suspension) 1× (red card) | Report | 1× (yellow card) 4× (suspension) | Max-Schmeling-Halle, Berlin; Referees: Heine, Standke |

| 2 October 2024; 19:00 | HSC 2000 Coburg | 25–22 | TVB Stuttgart | HUK-COBURG arena, Coburg; Attendance: 1,556; Referees: Köppl, Regner |
| 2 October 2024; 19:00 | Schmidt 7 | (13–10) | Fernández, Rubin 4 | HUK-COBURG arena, Coburg; Attendance: 1,556; Referees: Köppl, Regner |
| 2 October 2024; 19:00 | 2× (suspension) | Report | 3× (suspension) | HUK-COBURG arena, Coburg; Attendance: 1,556; Referees: Köppl, Regner |

2 October 2024
19:00
HC Empor Rostock
42–40 (ET)
HSG Nordhorn-Lingen
Fiete-Reder-Halle, Rostock
Referees: Klinke, Klinke
Funke 8
(17–15)
Firnhaber 14
1× (yellow card) 5× (suspension)
Report
2× (suspension)

FT: 33–33 ET: 9–7

| 2 October 2024; 19:00 | TuS Nettelstedt-Lübbecke | 23–32 | SC DHfK Leipzig | Merkur Arena, Lübbecke; Referees: Thöne, Zupanovic |
| 2 October 2024; 19:00 | Wesseling 4 | (6–14) | Binder 9 | Merkur Arena, Lübbecke; Referees: Thöne, Zupanovic |
| 2 October 2024; 19:00 | 2× (suspension) 1× (red card) | Report | 5× (suspension) | Merkur Arena, Lübbecke; Referees: Thöne, Zupanovic |

| 2 October 2024; 19:30 | ASV Hamm-Westfalen | 30–31 | TUSEM Essen | WESTPRESS arena, Hamm; Referees: Kern, Kuschel |
| 2 October 2024; 19:30 | Bornemann 8 | (14–15) | Eißing 7 | WESTPRESS arena, Hamm; Referees: Kern, Kuschel |
| 2 October 2024; 19:30 | 4× (suspension) | Report | 5× (suspension) 1× (red card) | WESTPRESS arena, Hamm; Referees: Kern, Kuschel |

| 2 October 2024; 19:30 | HBW Balingen-Weilstetten | 34–32 | HSG Wetzlar | Sparkassen-Arena, Balingen; Referees: Kuttler, Merz |
| 2 October 2024; 19:30 | Müller, Pfattheicher 6 | (21–16) | Mappes 5 | Sparkassen-Arena, Balingen; Referees: Kuttler, Merz |
| 2 October 2024; 19:30 | 1× (yellow card) 9× (suspension) | Report | 2× (suspension) | Sparkassen-Arena, Balingen; Referees: Kuttler, Merz |

| 2 October 2024; 19:30 | VfL Eintracht Hagen | 26–29 | Rhein-Neckar Löwen | Ischelandhalle, Hagen; Referees: vom Dorff, vom Dorff |
| 2 October 2024; 19:30 | Von Boenigk 8 | (14–15) | Martinović 7 | Ischelandhalle, Hagen; Referees: vom Dorff, vom Dorff |
| 2 October 2024; 19:30 | 1× (yellow card) 4× (suspension) | Report | 1× (yellow card) 1× (suspension) 1× (red card) | Ischelandhalle, Hagen; Referees: vom Dorff, vom Dorff |

| 2 October 2024; 19:30 | HC Erlangen | 27–28 | VfL Gummersbach | Arena Nürnberger Versicherung, Nuremberg; Attendance: 2,853; Referees: Blümel, Loppaschewski |
| 2 October 2024; 19:30 | Gömmel 8 | (12–15) | Schluroff, Viðarsson 6 | Arena Nürnberger Versicherung, Nuremberg; Attendance: 2,853; Referees: Blümel, Loppaschewski |
| 2 October 2024; 19:30 | 4× (suspension) | Report | 4× (suspension) | Arena Nürnberger Versicherung, Nuremberg; Attendance: 2,853; Referees: Blümel, Loppaschewski |

| 2 October 2024; 19:30 | SG BBM Bietigheim | 26–31 | ThSV Eisenach | EgeTrans Arena, Bietigheim-Bissingen; Referees: Baumgart, Dinges |
| 2 October 2024; 19:30 | three players 4 | (8–18) | Walz 8 | EgeTrans Arena, Bietigheim-Bissingen; Referees: Baumgart, Dinges |
| 2 October 2024; 19:30 | 4× (suspension) | Report | 2× (yellow card) 7× (suspension) | EgeTrans Arena, Bietigheim-Bissingen; Referees: Baumgart, Dinges |

| 3 October 2024; 15:00 | HSV Hamburg | 27–30 | THW Kiel | Barclays Arena, Hamburg; Attendance: 5,876; Referees: Brodbeck, Reich |
| 3 October 2024; 15:00 | | (12–12) | | Barclays Arena, Hamburg; Attendance: 5,876; Referees: Brodbeck, Reich |
| 3 October 2024; 15:00 | | Report | | Barclays Arena, Hamburg; Attendance: 5,876; Referees: Brodbeck, Reich |

== Round of 16 ==
The draw took place on 3 October 2024. The games will be played on 13 and 14 November 2024.

| 13 November 2024; 19:00 | TSV Hannover-Burgdorf | 26–33 | SG Flensburg-Handewitt | ZAG-Arena, Hanover; Attendance: 7,513; Referees: vom Dorff, vom Dorff |
| 13 November 2024; 19:00 | Fischer 8 | (13–14) | Pytlick 7 | ZAG-Arena, Hanover; Attendance: 7,513; Referees: vom Dorff, vom Dorff |
| 13 November 2024; 19:00 | 1× (yellow card) 1× (suspension) | Report | 4× (suspension) | ZAG-Arena, Hanover; Attendance: 7,513; Referees: vom Dorff, vom Dorff |

| 13 November 2024; 19:00 | HC Empor Rostock | 28–36 | HBW Balingen-Weilstetten | Fiete-Reder-Halle, Rostock; Attendance: 735; Referees: Thöne, Zupanovic |
| 13 November 2024; 19:00 | Meuser, Pratschner 5 | (19–19) | Grüner 8 | Fiete-Reder-Halle, Rostock; Attendance: 735; Referees: Thöne, Zupanovic |
| 13 November 2024; 19:00 | 6× (suspension) | Report | 5× (suspension) | Fiete-Reder-Halle, Rostock; Attendance: 735; Referees: Thöne, Zupanovic |

| 13 November 2024; 19:30 | TUSEM Essen | 27–32 | MT Melsungen | Sportpark am Hallo, Essen; Referees: Blümel, Loppaschewski |
| 13 November 2024; 19:30 | Hermeling, Wilhelm 5 | (15–14) | Barrufet 7 | Sportpark am Hallo, Essen; Referees: Blümel, Loppaschewski |
| 13 November 2024; 19:30 | 2× (suspension) | Report | 1× (suspension) | Sportpark am Hallo, Essen; Referees: Blümel, Loppaschewski |

| 13 November 2024; 19:30 | ThSV Eisenach | 30–24 | SC DHfK Leipzig | Werner-Aßmann-Halle, Eisenach; Attendance: 2,800; Referees: Schulze, Tönnies |
| 13 November 2024; 19:30 | three players 5 | (15–10) | Rúnarsson 7 | Werner-Aßmann-Halle, Eisenach; Attendance: 2,800; Referees: Schulze, Tönnies |
| 13 November 2024; 19:30 | 1× (suspension) | Report | 1× (yellow card) 4× (suspension) | Werner-Aßmann-Halle, Eisenach; Attendance: 2,800; Referees: Schulze, Tönnies |

| 13 November 2024; 19:30 | HSC 2000 Coburg | 29–28 | TBV Lemgo | HUK-COBURG arena, Coburg; Attendance: 2,109; Referees: Hellbusch, Jansen |
| 13 November 2024; 19:30 | Fuß, Helmersson 7 | (14–14) | Suton, Versteijnen 6 | HUK-COBURG arena, Coburg; Attendance: 2,109; Referees: Hellbusch, Jansen |
| 13 November 2024; 19:30 | 1× (yellow card) 3× (suspension) 1× (red card) | Report | 1× (yellow card) 3× (suspension) | HUK-COBURG arena, Coburg; Attendance: 2,109; Referees: Hellbusch, Jansen |

| 13 November 2024; 20:00 | THW Kiel | 29–28 | SC Magdeburg | Wunderino Arena, Kiel; Attendance: 7,521; Referees: Thiyagarajah, Thiyagarajah |
| 13 November 2024; 20:00 | Imre, Madsen 5 | (14–14) | Damgaard 8 | Wunderino Arena, Kiel; Attendance: 7,521; Referees: Thiyagarajah, Thiyagarajah |
| 13 November 2024; 20:00 | 1× (yellow card) 3× (suspension) | Report | 2× (yellow card) 3× (suspension) | Wunderino Arena, Kiel; Attendance: 7,521; Referees: Thiyagarajah, Thiyagarajah |

| 14 November 2024; 19:00 | VfL Gummersbach | 29–24 | Bergischer HC | Schwalbe-Arena, Gummersbach; Referees: Hurst, Krag |
| 14 November 2024; 19:00 | Schluroff 7 | (17–14) | M'Bengue 6 | Schwalbe-Arena, Gummersbach; Referees: Hurst, Krag |
| 14 November 2024; 19:00 | 1× (yellow card) 3× (suspension) | Report | 1× (yellow card) 3× (suspension) | Schwalbe-Arena, Gummersbach; Referees: Hurst, Krag |

| 14 November 2024; 20:00 | Rhein-Neckar Löwen | 30–29 | Füchse Berlin | SNP Dome, Heidelberg; Attendance: 3,791; Referees: Baumgart, Dinges |
| 14 November 2024; 20:00 | Martinović 10 | (12–16) | Freihöfer 8 | SNP Dome, Heidelberg; Attendance: 3,791; Referees: Baumgart, Dinges |
| 14 November 2024; 20:00 | 1× (yellow card) 3× (suspension) | Report | 2× (yellow card) 1× (suspension) | SNP Dome, Heidelberg; Attendance: 3,791; Referees: Baumgart, Dinges |

== Quarterfinals ==
The draw took place on 14 November 2024. The games were played on 18 and 19 December 2024.

18 December 2024
19:30
HSC 2000 Coburg
33–38 (ET)
HBW Balingen-Weilstetten
HUK-COBURG arena, Coburg
Attendance: 3,530
Referees: Baumgart, Dinges
Schmidt 7
(17–15)
Pfattheicher 7
2× (yellow card) 2× (suspension)
Report
1× (yellow card) 7× (suspension)

FT: 30–30 ET: 3–8

| 19 December 2024; 19:00 | Rhein-Neckar Löwen | 31–28 | ThSV Eisenach | SNP Dome, Heidelberg; Referees: Thöne, Zupanovic |
| 19 December 2024; 19:00 | Martinović 11 | (15–15) | Grgić 10 | SNP Dome, Heidelberg; Referees: Thöne, Zupanovic |
| 19 December 2024; 19:00 | 1× (yellow card) 6× (suspension) | Report | 1× (yellow card) 4× (suspension) | SNP Dome, Heidelberg; Referees: Thöne, Zupanovic |

| 19 December 2024; 19:00 | THW Kiel | 36–33 | VfL Gummersbach | Wunderino Arena, Kiel; Attendance: 7,510; Referees: Heine, Standke |
| 19 December 2024; 19:00 | Madsen 8 | (20–20) | Horžen 6 | Wunderino Arena, Kiel; Attendance: 7,510; Referees: Heine, Standke |
| 19 December 2024; 19:00 | 3× (suspension) | Report | 1× (yellow card) 3× (suspension) | Wunderino Arena, Kiel; Attendance: 7,510; Referees: Heine, Standke |

| 19 December 2024; 20:00 | MT Melsungen | 30–28 | SG Flensburg-Handewitt | Rothenbach-Halle, Melsungen; Referees: vom Dorff, vom Dorff |
| 19 December 2024; 20:00 | Kastening 6 | (14–13) | Pytlick 8 | Rothenbach-Halle, Melsungen; Referees: vom Dorff, vom Dorff |
| 19 December 2024; 20:00 | 2× (yellow card) 3× (suspension) | Report | 3× (yellow card) 3× (suspension) | Rothenbach-Halle, Melsungen; Referees: vom Dorff, vom Dorff |

== Final ==
The draw took place on 19 December 2024. The games were played on 12 and 13 April 2025 at the Lanxess Arena, Cologne.

=== Bracket ===
Semi-finals
12 April
THW Kiel (ET) | 32
Rhein-Neckar Löwen | 31
12 April
MT Melsungen | 31
HBW Balingen-Weilstetten | 27

Final
13 April
THW Kiel | 28
MT Melsungen | 23
Third place
13 April
Rhein-Neckar Löwen | 31
HBW Balingen-Weilstetten | 32

=== Semifinals ===
12 April 2025
16:10
THW Kiel
32–31 (ET)
Rhein-Neckar Löwen
Lanxess Arena, Cologne
Referees: Hurst, Krag
Madsen 11
(14–17)
Knorr 9
4× (suspension)
Report
5× (suspension) 1× (red card)

FT: 28–28 ET: 4–3

| 12 April 2025; 19:00 | MT Melsungen | 31–27 | HBW Balingen-Weilstetten | Lanxess Arena, Cologne; Referees: Baumgart, Dinges |
| 12 April 2025; 19:00 | Balenciaga 6 | (15–14) | Pfattheicher, Robert Timmermeister 6 | Lanxess Arena, Cologne; Referees: Baumgart, Dinges |
| 12 April 2025; 19:00 | 4× (suspension) | Report | 2× (yellow card) 2× (suspension) | Lanxess Arena, Cologne; Referees: Baumgart, Dinges |

=== Third place game ===
| 13 April 2025; 12:45 | Rhein-Neckar Löwen | 31–32 | HBW Balingen-Weilstetten | Lanxess Arena, Cologne; Referees: Blümel, Loppaschewski |
| 13 April 2025; 12:45 | Móré 7 | (15–19) | Müller 7 | Lanxess Arena, Cologne; Referees: Blümel, Loppaschewski |
| 13 April 2025; 12:45 | 2× (yellow card) 1× (suspension) | Report | 2× (yellow card) 8× (suspension) 1× (red card) | Lanxess Arena, Cologne; Referees: Blümel, Loppaschewski |

=== Final ===
| 13 April 2025; 15:35 | THW Kiel | 28–23 | MT Melsungen | Lanxess Arena, Cologne; Referees: Schulze, Tönnies |
| 13 April 2025; 15:35 | | (10–9) | | Lanxess Arena, Cologne; Referees: Schulze, Tönnies |
| 13 April 2025; 15:35 | | Report | | Lanxess Arena, Cologne; Referees: Schulze, Tönnies |
