= Lasse Andersson =

Danish handball player (born 1994)

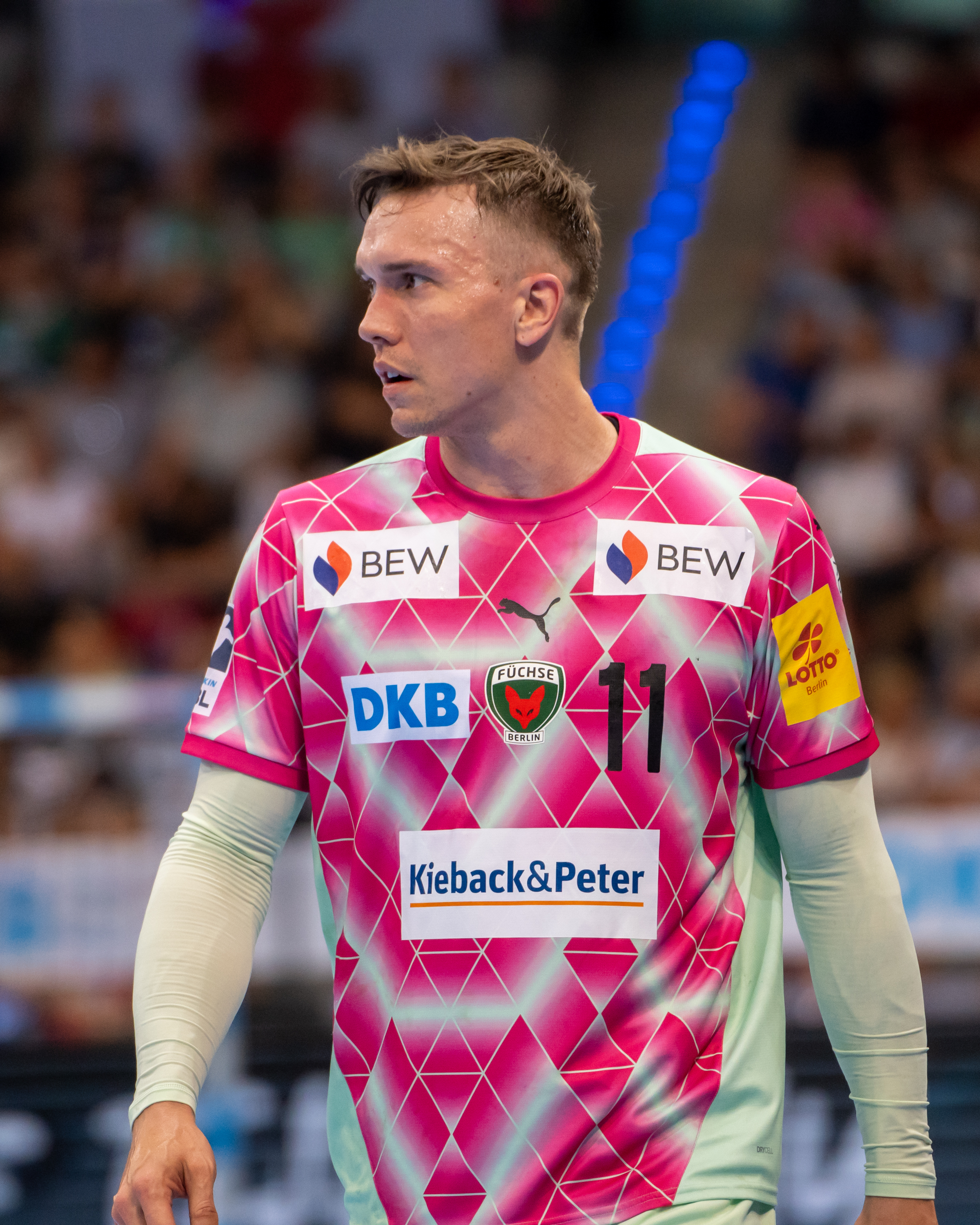
- Andersson in 2025

Personal information
- Full name: Lasse Bredekjær Andersson
- Nationality: Danish
- Born: 11 March 1994 (age 32) Copenhagen, Denmark
- Height: 1.90 m (6 ft 3 in)

Sport
- Sport: Handball
- Position: Left back
- Current club: HØJ Elite
- Number: 11

Youth career
- Years: Team
- –2012: FIF Håndbold

Senior clubs
- Years: Team
- 2012–2013: TMS Ringsted
- 2013–2016: KIF Kolding København
- 2016–2020: FC Barcelona
- 2020–2026: Füchse Berlin
- 2026–: HØJ Elite
National team
| Years | Team | Apps | (Gls) |
| 2015– | Denmark | 86 | (121) |
Medal record
Olympic Games
| Gold medal – first place | 2024 Paris | Team |
| Silver medal – second place | 2020 Tokyo | Team |
World Championship
| Gold medal – first place | 2021 Egypt |
| Gold medal – first place | 2025 Croatia/Denmark/Norway |
European Championship
| Gold medal – first place | 2026 Denmark/Norway/Sweden |
| Bronze medal – third place | 2022 Hungary/Slovakia |
- Updated on 15 January 2026

Lasse Bredekjær Andersson (born 11 March 1994) is a Danish handball player for Füchse Berlin and the Danish national team. He holds the world record for the fastest measured handball shot at 140 km/h.

== Career ==
Andersson began playing handball at age four with Copenhagen club Frederiksberg IF. In December 2012, he joined TMS Ringsted, signing his first professional contract. That season, he won the 'Årets Talent' award with KIF Kolding. In 2013, he moved to KIF Kolding København, where he won the Danish Championship in 2014 and 2015 and the Danish Cup in 2013.

In 2016, Andersson signed with FC Barcelona. He played there for four years, winning the Spanish league and cup double each season. In March 2018, he suffered a cruciate ligament rupture, sidelining him for 13 months.

In 2020, Andersson joined German club Füchse Berlin. In September 2024, he extended his contract until 2027. With Füchse, he won the EHF European League in 2023 and the 2024–25 Handball-Bundesliga, the club's first Bundesliga title. In the 2024–25 season, he reached the 2024–25 EHF Champions League final, where Füchse lost to SC Magdeburg.

In 2026 he won the DHB-Pokal with the club. In the final against Bergischer HC he was the top scorer with 10 goals. For the 2026–27 season he signed for Danish club HØJ Elite. After signing the contract, HØJ was relegated. Andersson decided to join the club regardless in the 1st Division despite Füchse being interested in keeping him and several Danish top league clubs being interested in signing him.

=== National team ===
Andersson competed at the 2012 U18 European Championship and the 2013 Men's Junior World Handball Championship. He debuted for the Danish senior team in 2015. He won gold at the 2021 World Championship and the 2024 Summer Olympics, and silver at the 2020 Summer Olympics.

At the 2026 European Men's Handball Championship he won gold medals, meaning that Denmark held both the World, European and Olympic titles at the same time, as only the second team ever after France's 'Les Experts'.

== Personal life ==
His brother, Nicolaj Bredekjær Andersson, is a handball coach. He supports the football club FC København.

== Honours ==
KIF Kolding

- Danish Championship:
  - 2014, 2015
- Danish Cup:
  - 2013

FC Barcelona

- Liga ASOBAL:
  - 2016–17, 2017–18, 2018–19, 2019–20
- Copa del Rey:
  - 2016–17, 2017–18, 2018–19, 2019–20
- Copa ASOBAL:
  - 2016–17, 2017–18, 2018–19, 2019–20
- Supercopa ASOBAL:
  - 2016–17, 2017–18, 2018–19, 2019–20
- IHF Super Globe:
  - 2017, 2018, 2019

Füchse Berlin

- EHF European League:
  - 2023
- Handball-Bundesliga:
  - Winner: 2025
  - Silver: 2024
  - Bronze: 2022, 2023
- EHF Champions League:
  - Silver: 2025
- DHB-Pokal:
  - Winner: 2026
