= Tim Suton =

German handball player (born 1996)

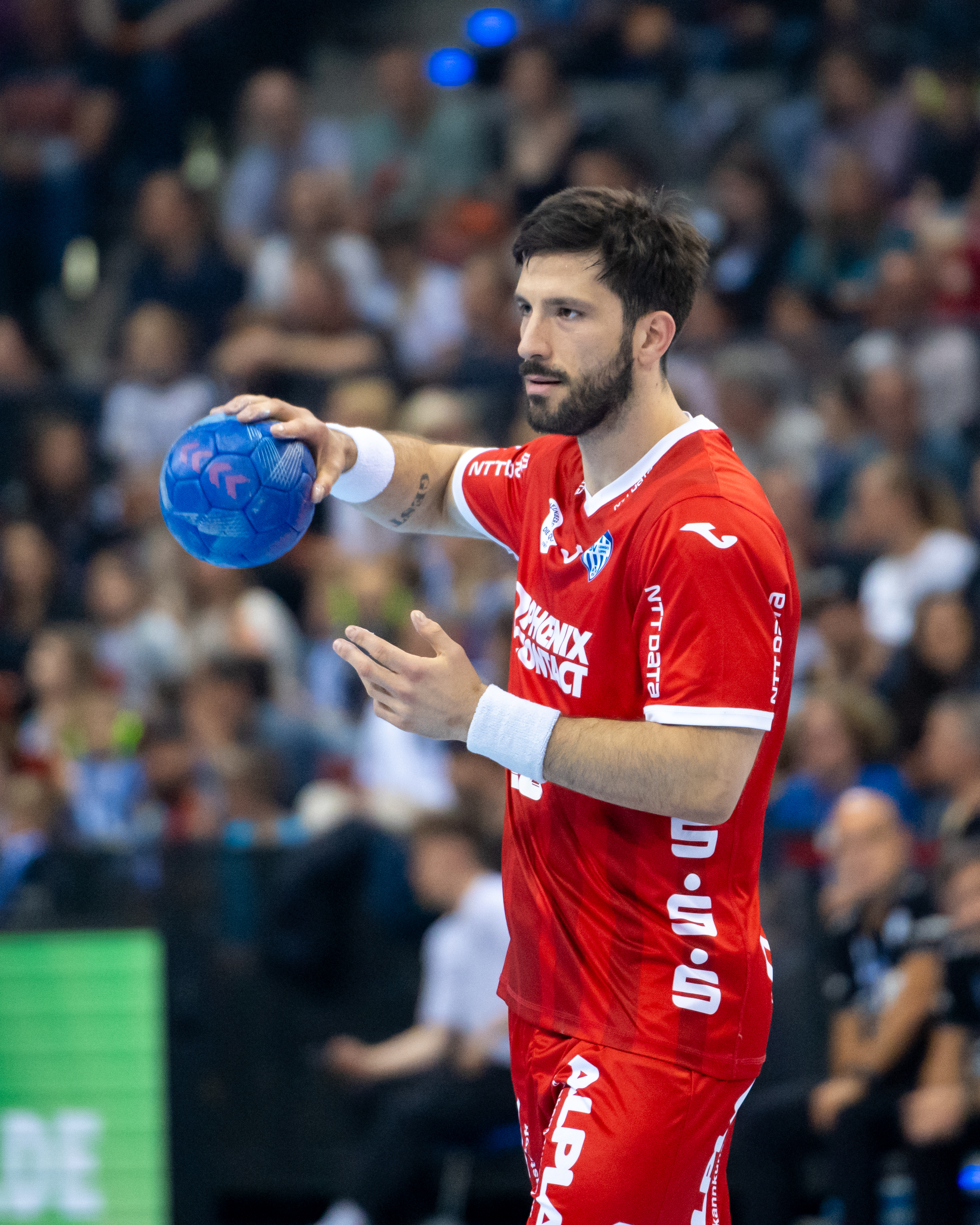

Personal information
- Nationality: German
- Born: 8 May 1996 (age 30) Kirchheim unter Teck, Germany
- Height: 1.91 m (6 ft 3 in)

Sport
- Sport: Handball
- Position: Centre back
- Current club: TBV Lemgo
- Number: 23

Youth career
- Years: Team
- –: TV Willstätt
- –: HSG Düsseldorf
- –2012: TSV Bayer Dormagen
- 2012–2013: HSG Völklingen

Senior clubs
- Years: Team
- 2012–2014: HG Saarlouis
- 2014: Rhein-Neckar Löwen
- 2014–2015: TBV Lemgo
- 2015–2016: TuS N-Lübbecke
- 2016–: TBV Lemgo Lippe
National team
Years	Team	Apps	(Gls)
2017–	Germany	14	(19)
- Updated on 22. August 2022

Tim Suton (born 8 May 1996) is a German handball player for TBV Lemgo and the German national team.

He participated at the 2019 World Men's Handball Championship.
