= HC Empor Rostock =

German handball club

- Full name: Handballclub Empor Rostock
- Founded: 1946 / unified 11 November 1954
- Arena: Stadthalle Rostock and Sporthalle Marienehe
- President: Thomas Schneider
- Head coach: Maik Handschke
- League: 3. Liga
- 2023-24: 2nd
- Club colours
Home	Away

HC Empor Rostock is a team handball club from Rostock, Germany.

Empor Rostock was one of the most successful team handball clubs of the GDR, winning both the GDR Championship and GDR Pokal on seven occasions and the European Club Championship and EHF Cup Winners' Cup in 1982.

== History ==
The team was founded in 1946 as a part of broader sportsclub SC Empor Rostock, one year after the second World War. It was the first Rostock based team, that could compete at a national level.

When Germany reunified, the team joined the Handball-Bundesliga, where they played for 1991 to 1993.

On 25 February 1999 the handball club separated from SC Empor Rostock and became Handball-Club Empor Rostock.

In 2002 the women's team was separated from HC Empor for economic reasons and became PSV Rostock.

== Crest, colours, supporters ==
=== Kits ===
AWAY
2011–13	2014–15	2015–16

== Current squad ==
NO.	NAME	NATIONALITY	POSITION
1	Marco Stange	Deutschland	TW
16	Oliver Mayer	Deutschland	TW
20	Oliver Schröder	Deutschland	TW
2	Carsten Granschow	Deutschland	RR, RA
3	Martin Waschul	Deutschland	RL
4	Matthias Struck	Deutschland	RR, RA
5	Robert Kählke	Deutschland	RA, RR
6	Jens Dethloff	Deutschland	KM
7	Stefan Jähnke	Deutschland	RM, RR
8	Torsten Schilk	Deutschland	RR, RA
9	Dennis Leissink	Deutschland	LA, RM
10	Uwe Kalski	Deutschland	RM, LA
11	Max Baldauf	Deutschland	RA
18	Marvin Nartey	Deutschland	RL
22	Ludek Drobek	Tschechien	RL
49	Christian Schwartz	Deutschland	KM
72	Lars Rabenhorst	Deutschland	RL

== Honours ==
=== Men ===
- 10x DDR Champion
  - Indoor Handball: 1953, 1954, 1956, 1957, 1968, 1973, 1978, 1986, 1987
  - Field Handball: 1955
- 9x DDR Vice Champion
  - Indoor Handball: 1970, 1980, 1981, 1982
  - Field Handball: 1948, 1949, 1950, 1953, 1958
- 7x DDR Cup Winner
  - 1980, 1981, 1985, 1986, 1987, 1988, 1989
- Champion's League Finalist
  1979
- Cup Winner's Cup
  1982
- Cup Winner's Cup Finalist
  1983
- European Club Championship
  1982
- Team of the Year (GDR)
  1961
- Bundesliga
  1991-1993

=== Women ===
- 6x Champion
  - Indoor Handball: 1966, 1967, 1989
  - Field Handball: 1964, 1965, 1966
