= Mohamed Darmoul =

Tunisian handball player

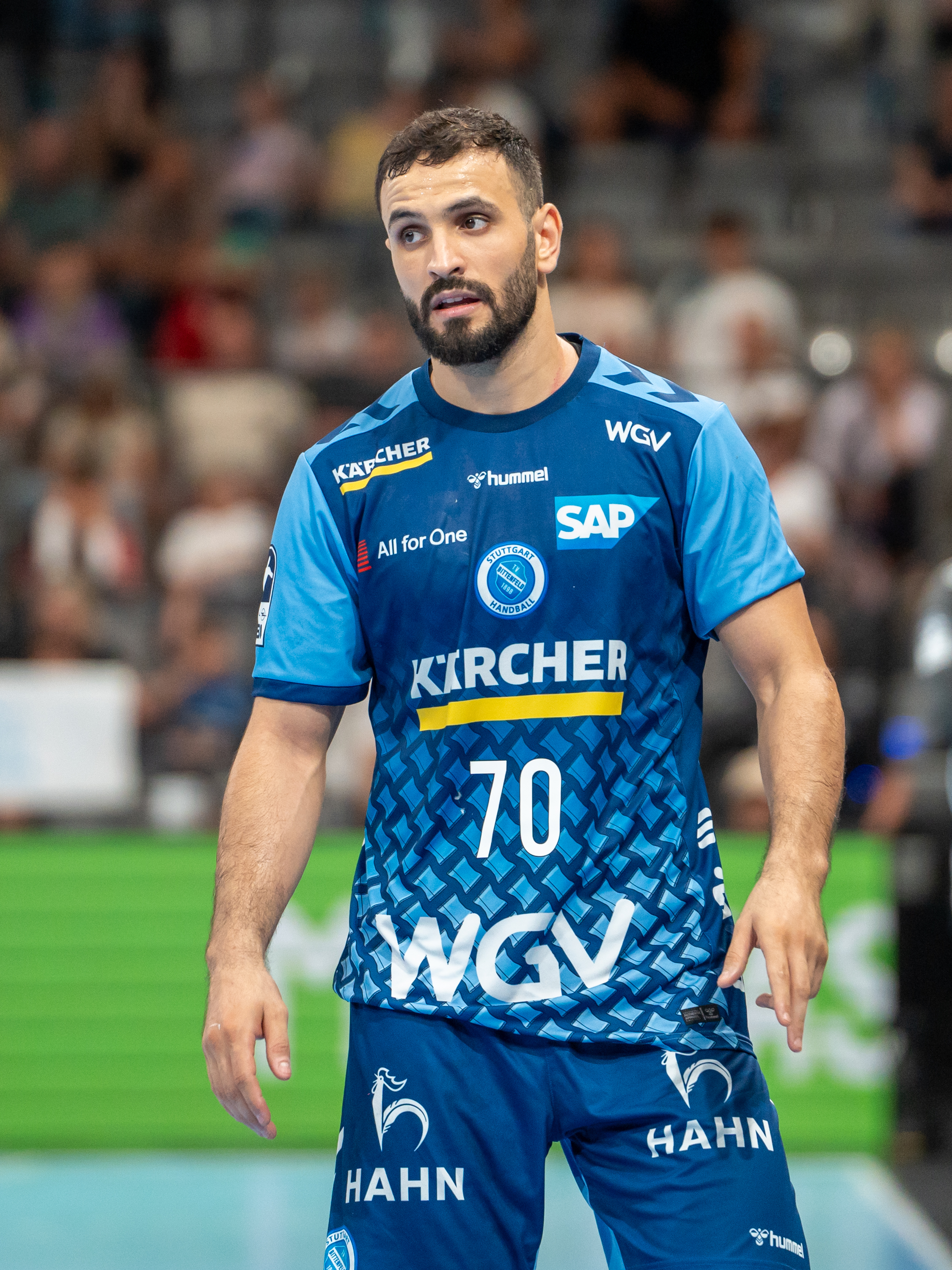

Personal information
- Full name: Mohamed Amine Darmoul
- Nationality: Tunisian
- Born: 4 February 1998 (age 28) Sousse, Tunisia
- Height: 1.83 m (6 ft 0 in)

Sport
- Sport: Handball
- Position: Centre back
- Current club: TVB Stuttgart
- Number: 70

Senior clubs
- Years: Team
- 2017–2021: Étoile Sportive du Sahel
- 2020: → Al-Khaleej
- 2021: → Mudhar
- 2021–2024: GWD Minden
- 2024: Al Arabi
- 2024–2026: MT Melsungen
- 2026 -: TVB Stuttgart
National team
| Years | Team | Apps | (Gls) |
| – | Tunisia | 44 | (145) |
Medal record
African Championship
| Silver medal – second place | 2020 Tunisia |
- Updated on 9 May 2024

Mohamed Amine Darmoul (arabic: محمد أمين درمول, born 4 February 1998) is a Tunisian handball player for MT Melsungen and the Tunisian national team.

He represented Tunisia at the 2021 World Men's Handball Championship.
