= Frederik Bo Andersen =

Danish handball player (born 1998)

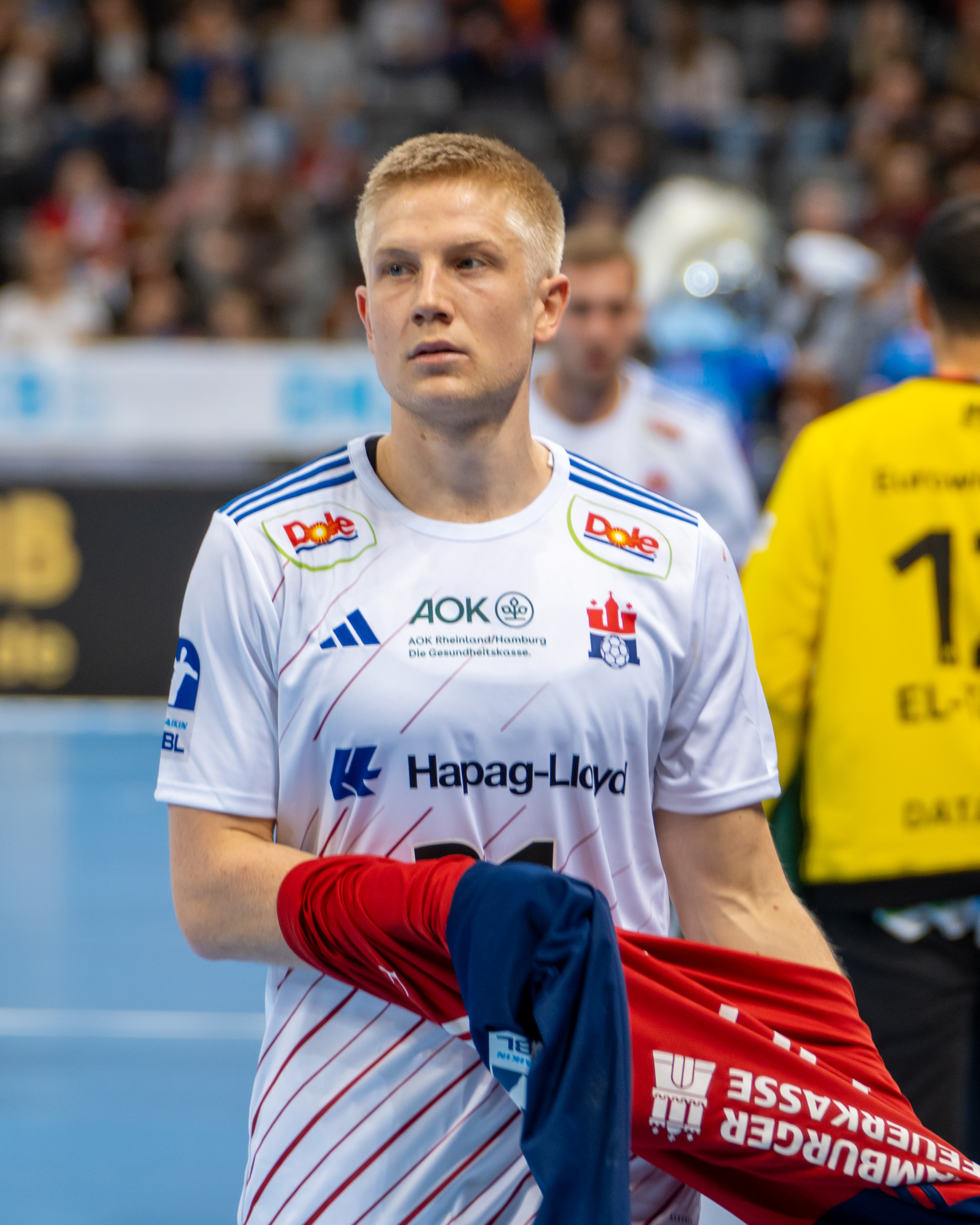
- Andersen for HSV Hamburg in 2024

Personal information
- Nationality: Danish
- Born: 9 December 1998 (age 27) Roskilde, Danmark
- Height: 186 cm (73 in)

Sport
- Sport: Handball
- Position: Right wing
- Current club: HSV Hamburg
- Number: 21

Youth career
- Years: Team
- –2015: Roskilde Håndbold
- 2015–2016: GOG Håndbold

Senior clubs
- Years: Team
- 2018–2021: GOG Håndbold
- 2021–: HSV Hamburg
National team
Years	Team	Apps	(Gls)
2024–	Denmark	6	(10)
Medal record
European Championship
Gold medal – first place	2026 Denmark/Norway/Sweden
- Updated on 3 February 2026

Frederik Bo Andersen (born 9 December 1998) is a Danish handball player for HSV Hamburg and the Danish national team.

== Career ==
Andersen started playing handball at Roskilde Håndbold and then joined GOG Håndbold in 2015, where he made his league debut. He won the Danish Men's Handball Cup in 2019 with the club.

In 2021, he joined German club HSV Hamburg.

He made his debut for the Danish national team on 6 November 2024 against Norway. His first major international tournament was the 2026 European Men's Handball Championship, where Denmark won gold medals. This meant that Denmark held both the World, European and Olympic titles at the same time, as only the second team ever after France's 'Les Experts'. He did however only play a single game at the tournament.
