= DHB-Pokal =

Elimination handball tournament held annually in Germany

- Current season, competition or edition: 2026–27 DHB-Pokal
- Sport: Handball
- Founded: 1975; 51 years ago
- Administrator: DHB
- No. of teams: 58
- Country: Germany
- Most recent champion: Füchse Berlin (2025–26)
- Most titles: THW Kiel (13 titles)
- International cup: EHF Cup
- Website: daikin-hbl.de

The DHB-Pokal (English: German Handball Federation Cup) is an elimination handball tournament held annually in Germany. It is the second most important handball national title in the country after the Handball-Bundesliga championship.

== DHB-Pokal Winners ==
Year	Winner	Score	Runner Up
1975	TSV Grün-Weiß Dankersen	15:14	TSV 1896 Rintheim
1976	TSV Grün-Weiß Dankersen	13:12	SG Dietzenbach
1977	VfL Gummersbach	16:14	TV Hüttenberg
1978	VfL Gummersbach	14:11	TV Hüttenberg
1979	TSV Grün-Weiß Dankersen	19:14	THW Kiel
1980	TV Großwallstadt	17:15	TuS Nettelstedt
1981	TuS Nettelstedt	15:19, 22:17	VfL Günzburg
1982	VfL Gummersbach	18:19, 18:12	TV Großwallstadt
1983	VfL Gummersbach	15:14, 23:16	TUSEM Essen
1984	TV Großwallstadt	17:20, 20:14	Reinickendorfer Füchse
1985	VfL Gummersbach	20:16, 30:19	TV Großwallstadt
1986	MTSV Schwabing	32:29, 16:18	VfL Gummersbach
1987	TV Großwallstadt	16:15, 21:22	TuRU Düsseldorf
1988	TUSEM Essen	25:18, 28:21	SG Wallau-Massenheim
1989	TV Großwallstadt	21:21, 21:18	VfL Gummersbach
1990	TSV Milbertshofen	16:12, 17:17	THW Kiel
1991	TUSEM Essen	21:16, 17:20	TV Niederwürzbach
1992	TUSEM Essen	20:19, 19:20, 5:4 (PS)	SG Flensburg-Handewitt
1993	SG Wallau-Massenheim	24:21	TSV Bayer Dormagen
1994	SG Wallau-Massenheim	17:14	SG Flensburg-Handewitt
1995	TBV Lemgo	24:18	HSV Düsseldorf
1996	SC Magdeburg	20:18	TUSEM Essen
1997	TBV Lemgo	28:23	HSG Dutenhofen/Müncholzhausen
1998	THW Kiel	30:15	TV Niederwürzbach
1999	THW Kiel	28:19	TBV Lemgo
2000	THW Kiel	30:25 (OT)	SG Flensburg-Handewitt
2001	VfL Bad Schwartau	30:23	HSG D/M Wetzlar
2002	TBV Lemgo	25:23	SC Magdeburg
2003	SG Flensburg-Handewitt	31:30 (OT)	TUSEM Essen
2004	SG Flensburg-Handewitt	29:23	HSV Hamburg
2005	SG Flensburg-Handewitt	33:31	THW Kiel
2006	HSV Hamburg	26:25	Rhein-Neckar Löwen
2007	THW Kiel	33:31	Rhein-Neckar Löwen
2008	THW Kiel	32:29	HSV Hamburg
2009	THW Kiel	30:24	VfL Gummersbach
2010	HSV Hamburg	34:33 (OT)	Rhein-Neckar Löwen
2011	THW Kiel	30:24	SG Flensburg-Handewitt
2012	THW Kiel	33:31	SG Flensburg-Handewitt
2013	THW Kiel	33:30	SG Flensburg-Handewitt
2014	Füchse Berlin	22:21	SG Flensburg-Handewitt
2015	SG Flensburg-Handewitt	27:27, 5:4 (PS)	SC Magdeburg
2016	SC Magdeburg	32:30	SG Flensburg-Handewitt
2017	THW Kiel	29:23	SG Flensburg-Handewitt
2018	Rhein-Neckar Löwen	30:26	TSV Hannover-Burgdorf
2019	THW Kiel	28:24	SC Magdeburg
2020	TBV Lemgo	28:24	MT Melsungen
2021	Due to the COVID-19 pandemic, no cup was held for 2020/21, instead the cup of 2019/20 was finished in 2021.		
2022	THW Kiel	28:21	SC Magdeburg
2023	Rhein-Neckar Löwen	36:34 (ET)	SC Magdeburg
2024	SC Magdeburg	30:19	MT Melsungen
2025	THW Kiel	28:23	MT Melsungen
2026	Füchse Berlin	42:33	Bergischer HC

== Total titles won ==
Club	Titles	Years
THW Kiel	13	1998, 1999, 2000, 2007, 2008, 2009, 2011, 2012, 2013, 2017, 2019, 2022, 2025
VfL Gummersbach	5	1977, 1978, 1982, 1983, 1985
TV Großwallstadt	4	1980, 1984, 1987, 1989
SG Flensburg-Handewitt	4	2003, 2004, 2005, 2015
TBV Lemgo	4	1995, 1997, 2002, 2020
TSV Grün-Weiß Dankersen	3	1975, 1976, 1979
TUSEM Essen	3	1988, 1991, 1992
SC Magdeburg	3	1996, 2016, 2024
SG Wallau-Massenheim	2	1993, 1994
HSV Hamburg	2	2006, 2010
Rhein-Neckar Löwen	2	2018, 2023
Füchse Berlin	2	2014, 2026
TuS Nettelstedt-Lübbecke	1	1981
MTSV Schwabing	1	1986
TSV Milbertshofen	1	1990
VfL Bad Schwartau	1	2001

== See also ==
- Handball-Bundesliga
- DHB-Supercup
- DHB-Pokal (women)
