= Scharrena Stuttgart =

Arena in Stuttgart, Germany

Coordinates: 48°47′32″N 9°13′55″E

Scharrena
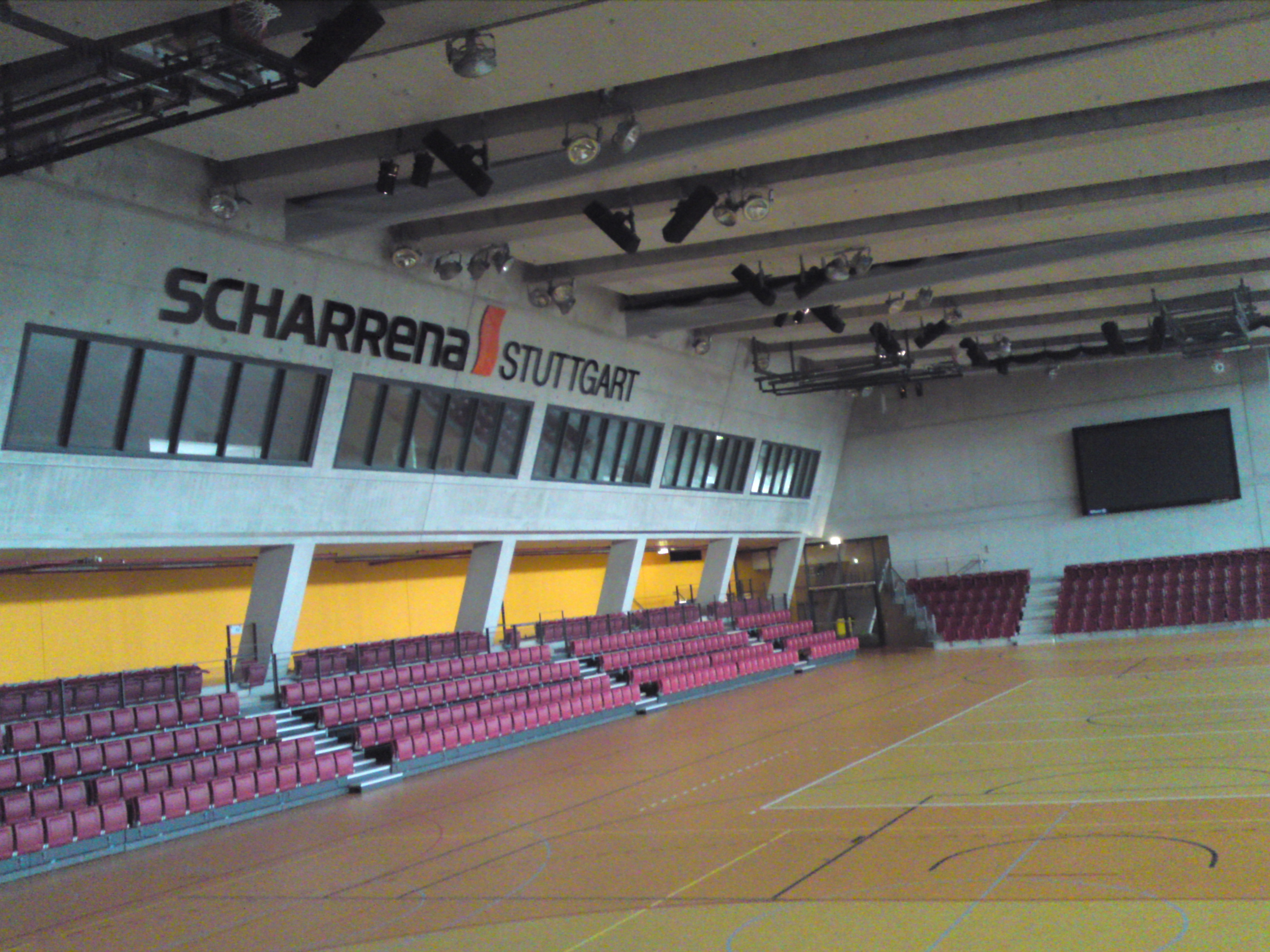
- Interactive map of Scharrena
- Full name: SCHARRena
- Location: Stuttgart, Baden-Württemberg; Germany
- Owner: City of Stuttgart
- Operator: Sports office of City of Stuttgart
- Capacity: 2,019 (Volleyball), (handball)

Construction
- Groundbreaking: 2009
- Built: 2011
- Cost: € 13,15 million

Tenants
- Smart Allianz Stuttgart (Volleyball) (2011-present); HV Stuttgarter Kickers (handball) (2011-present); MTV Stuttgart (gymnastics (2011-present] German Championship in Fistball 2012; TV Bittenfeld (handball) (starting season 2012-2013)

The Scharrena Stuttgart (SCHARRena Stuttgart official spelling) is a multi-purpose hall in Stuttgart's Bad Cannstatt district. The hall is located on the Neckar Park fairground, under the Unterthürkheimer Kurve stand of the MHPArena. The maximum capacity is 2,019 seats. Since April 2011, the Hall is the home ground of the women's volleyball national league Smart Alliance Stuttgart.

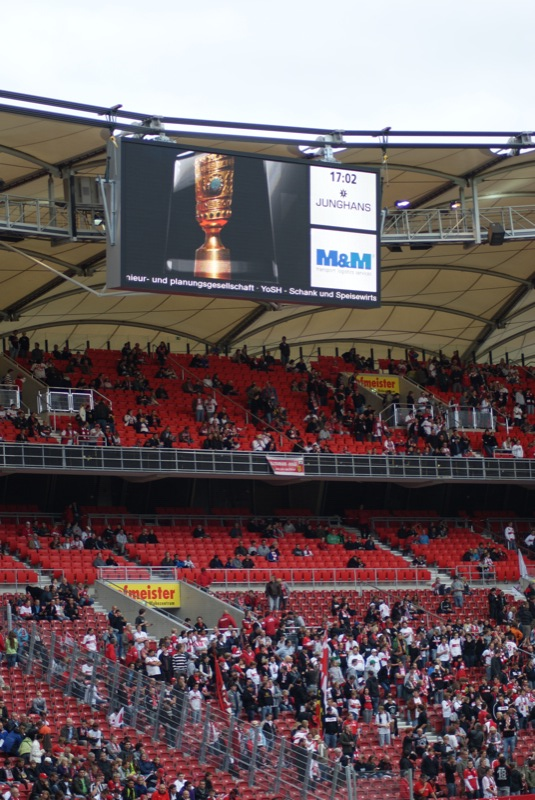
Scharrena is located under Unterthürkheimer Kurve (stand of MHPArena)
