= Dessau-Roßlauer HV =

German handball club

- Full name: Dessau-Roßlauer Handballverein von 2006 e. V.
- Nickname(s): ZAB Dessau, „Beavers“
- Founded: 2006; 20 years ago
- Arena: Anhalt Arena
- Capacity: 3,500
- President: Ralf Theumer
- Head coach: Uwe Jungandreas
- League: 2. Handball-Bundesliga
- 2024–25: 10th
- Club colours
Home	Away

Dessau-Roßlauer HV is a handball club from Dessau-Roßlau, Germany. Currently, they compete in the 2. Handball-Bundesliga. The club was founded in 2006 on the roots of the former team BSG ZAB Dessau, which which has roots back from 1898 and Roßlauer HV Jahn 1924 from 1924. BSG ZAB Dessau played in the 1st Bundesliga in 1991.

== Team ==
=== Current squad ===
Squad for the 2024–25 season

Goalkeepers

- 1 (Germany) Janik Patzwaldt
- 16 (Germany) Philip Ambrosius
- 33 (Germany) Max Mohs

Left wingers

- 3 (Germany) Fynn Gonschor
- 7 (Germany) Carl-Phillip Haake

Right wingers

- 18 (Slovakia) David Mišových
- 98 (Germany) Yannick-Marcos Pust

Line players

- 17 (Germany) Luka Baumgart
- 72 (Germany) Tim Maximilian Hertzfeld
- 99 (Germany) Tillman Leu

Left backs

- 14 (Poland) Jakub Powarzyński
- 26 (Germany) Yannick Danneberg

Centre backs

- 6 (Germany) Fritz-Leon Haake
- 10 (Germany) Vincent Bülow

Right backs

- 13 (Norway) Alexander Djordjije Mitrovic
- 15 (Poland) Marcel Nowak
- 24 (Germany) Oskar Emanuel

=== Transfers ===
Transfers for the 2026–27 season

Joining

- (Czech Republic) Martin Březina (CB) from (Czech Republic) HC Dukla Prague
- (Bosnia and Herzegovina) Alen Hadzimuhamedovic (LB) from (Germany) SG BBM Bietigheim
- (Germany) Niklas Döbbel (RB) from (Germany) SC Magdeburg
- (Germany) Tim Grüner (LW) from (Germany) HBW Balingen-Weilstetten
- (Germany) Leon Ciudad Benitez (LP) from (Germany) VfL Lübeck-Schwartau

Leaving

- (Germany) Tim Maximilian Hertzfeld (LP) to (Germany) SC DHfK Leipzig
- (Germany) Fritz-Leon Haake (CB) to (Germany) SC DHfK Leipzig
- (Germany) Fynn Gonschor (LW) to (Germany) HSG Ostsee N/G

=== Transfer History ===
Transfers for the 2025–26 season

Joining

- (North Macedonia) Tomislav Jagurinovski (RB) from (North Macedonia) RK Vardar

Leaving

- (Norway) Alexander Djordjije Mitrovic (RB) to (Norway) Kristiansand Topphåndball
- (Germany) Oskar Emanuel (RW) to (Germany) SG Pforzheim/Eutingen

=== Staff ===
Staff for the 2024–25 season

Pos.	Name
Managing director	(Germany) Sebastian Glock
Head coach	(Germany) Uwe Jungandreas
Assistant coach	(Bosnia and Herzegovina) Vanja Radić
Goalkeeping coach	(Germany) Thomas Vollert
Team physician	(Germany) Cindy Schödel
Physiotherapist	(Germany) Ive Lassanske
Physiotherapist	(Germany) Kerstin Habedank
