= Niels Versteijnen =

Dutch handball player (born 2000)

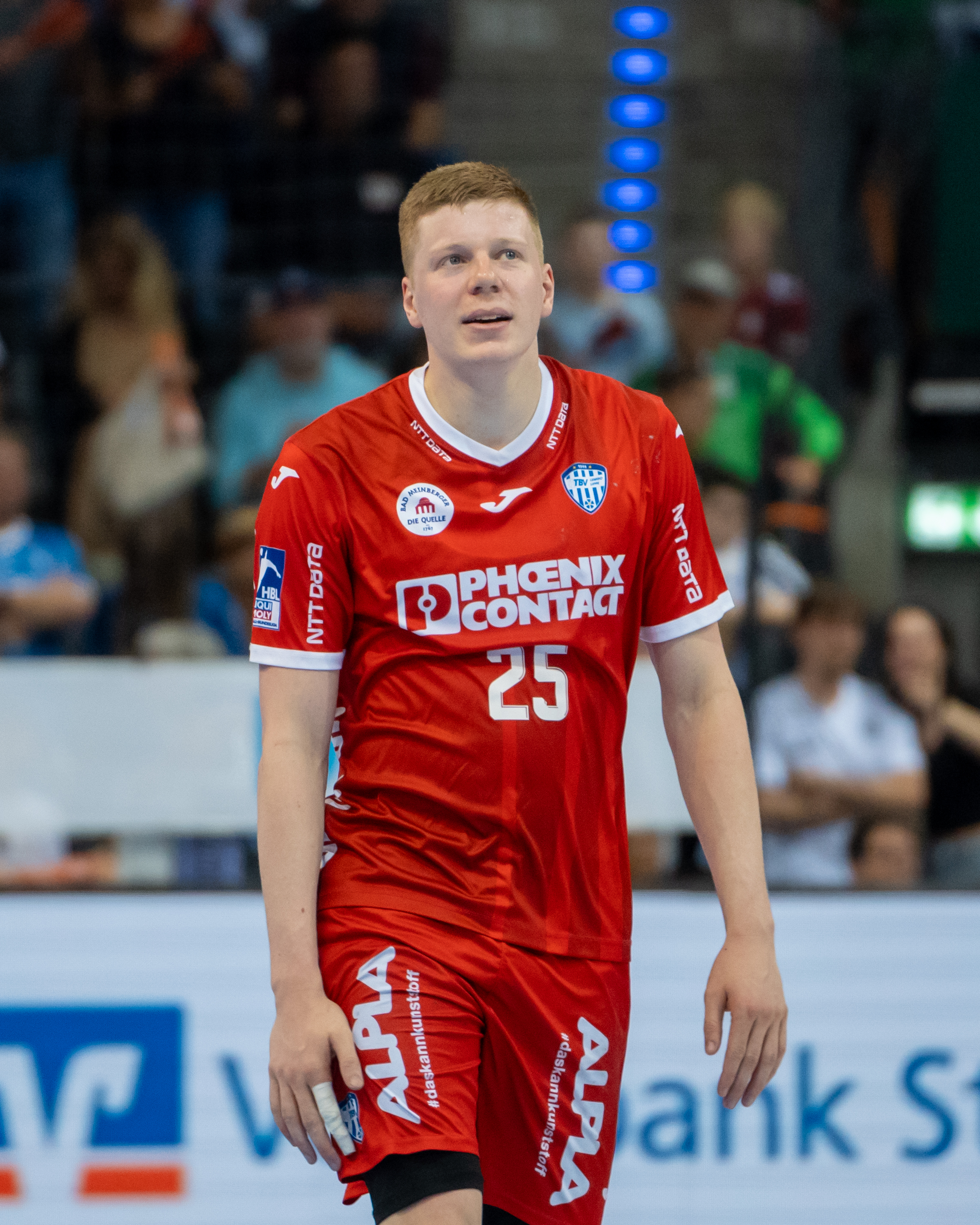
- Versteijnen with TBV Lemgo Lippe in 2024

Personal information
- Nationality: Dutch
- Born: 3 February 2000 (age 26) Groningen, Netherlands
- Height: 2.00 m (6 ft 7 in)

Sport
- Sport: Handball
- Position: Right back
- Current club: TBV Lemgo Lippe
- Number: 20

Youth career
- Years: Team
- –2013: White Demons
- 2013–2018: RED-RAG Tachos
- 2018–2019: SG Flensburg-Handewitt

Senior clubs
- Years: Team
- 2019–2022: SG Flensburg-Handewitt
- 2020–2022: → VfL Lübeck-Schwartau (loan)
- 2022–: TBV Lemgo Lippe
National team
| Years | Team | Apps | (Gls) |
| 2018– | Netherlands | 44 | (85) |

Niels Versteijnen (born 3 February 2000) is a Dutch handball player for German Bundesliga club TBV Lemgo-Lippe and the Dutch national team.

He represented the Netherlands at the 2020 European Men's Handball Championship.
