= 2021–22 DHB-Pokal =

The 2021–22 DHB-Pokal was the 45th edition of the tournament.

THW Kiel won their 13th title after defeating SC Magdeburg in the final.

== Round 1 ==
The draw was held on 20 July 2021. The matches were played from 26 to 29 August 2021. All Handball-Bundesliga teams had a bye.

26 August 2021; 19:30	1. VfL Potsdam	26–28	EHV Aue	MBS Arena, Potsdam; Attendance: 412; Referees: Zupanovic, Thone
26 August 2021; 19:30	Roosna 7	(11–15)	Kammlodt, Lux 5	MBS Arena, Potsdam; Attendance: 412; Referees: Zupanovic, Thone
26 August 2021; 19:30	5× (suspension)	Report	1× (yellow card) 3× (suspension) 1× (red card)	MBS Arena, Potsdam; Attendance: 412; Referees: Zupanovic, Thone

27 August 2021; 19:00	SG Pforzheim/Eutingen	20–25	VfL Gummersbach	Bertha-Benz-Halle, Pforzheim; Attendance: 350; Referees: Hofmann, Horath
27 August 2021; 19:00	Hohnerlein, Kusch 3	(8–14)	Styrmisson 7	Bertha-Benz-Halle, Pforzheim; Attendance: 350; Referees: Hofmann, Horath
27 August 2021; 19:00	1× (yellow card) 8× (suspension) 1× (red card)	Report	1× (yellow card) 4× (suspension) 1× (red card)	Bertha-Benz-Halle, Pforzheim; Attendance: 350; Referees: Hofmann, Horath

27 August 2021; 19:30	VfL Eintracht Hagen	30–32	TuS Ferndorf	Krollmann Arena, Hagen; Attendance: 340; Referees: Schmidt, Linker
27 August 2021; 19:30	Renninger 8	(16–18)	Bornemann 7	Krollmann Arena, Hagen; Attendance: 340; Referees: Schmidt, Linker
27 August 2021; 19:30	1× (yellow card) 5× (suspension) 1× (red card)	Report	1× (yellow card) 7× (suspension)	Krollmann Arena, Hagen; Attendance: 340; Referees: Schmidt, Linker

28 August 2021; 16:30	HC Empor Rostock	19–26	SG BBM Bietigheim	OSPA Arena, Rostock; Attendance: 300; Referees: Standke, Heine
28 August 2021; 16:30	Breitenfeldt 6	(8–14)	Wesseling 9	OSPA Arena, Rostock; Attendance: 300; Referees: Standke, Heine
28 August 2021; 16:30	1× (yellow card) 3× (suspension)	Report	1× (yellow card) 3× (suspension)	OSPA Arena, Rostock; Attendance: 300; Referees: Standke, Heine

28 August 2021; 18:00	SV 64 Zweibrücken	23–30	TuS Nettelstedt-Lübbecke	Westpfalzhalle Zweibrucken, Zweibrücken; Attendance: 350; Referees: Frank, Bona
28 August 2021; 18:00	Kockler 7	(12–15)	Skroblien 10	Westpfalzhalle Zweibrucken, Zweibrücken; Attendance: 350; Referees: Frank, Bona
28 August 2021; 18:00	4× (suspension) 2× (red card)	Report	1× (suspension)	Westpfalzhalle Zweibrucken, Zweibrücken; Attendance: 350; Referees: Frank, Bona

28 August 2021; 18:00	OHV Aurich	27–31	TV Grosswallstadt	Sparkassen Arena Aurich, Aurich; Attendance: 369; Referees: Klinke, Klinke
28 August 2021; 18:00	Wendlandt 11	(13–17)	Jansen 10	Sparkassen Arena Aurich, Aurich; Attendance: 369; Referees: Klinke, Klinke
28 August 2021; 18:00	1× (yellow card) 5× (suspension)	Report	3× (suspension)	Sparkassen Arena Aurich, Aurich; Attendance: 369; Referees: Klinke, Klinke

28 August 2021; 19:00	TGS Pforzheim	26–36	ASV Hamm-Westfalen	Bertha-Benz-Halle, Pforzheim; Attendance: 414; Referees: Heinz-Hebisch, Lenhardt
28 August 2021; 19:00	Taafel 7	(8–19)	Huesmann 7	Bertha-Benz-Halle, Pforzheim; Attendance: 414; Referees: Heinz-Hebisch, Lenhardt
28 August 2021; 19:00		Report	3× (suspension)	Bertha-Benz-Halle, Pforzheim; Attendance: 414; Referees: Heinz-Hebisch, Lenhardt

28 August 2021; 19:00	ATSV Habenhausen	24–27	TSV Bayer Dormagen	Hinni Schwenker Halle, Bremen; Attendance: 200; Referees: Otto, Piper
28 August 2021; 19:00	Hintke 6	(10–12)	Mast 6	Hinni Schwenker Halle, Bremen; Attendance: 200; Referees: Otto, Piper
28 August 2021; 19:00	2× (yellow card) 5× (suspension) 2× (red card)	Report	1× (yellow card) 4× (suspension)	Hinni Schwenker Halle, Bremen; Attendance: 200; Referees: Otto, Piper

28 August 2021
19:30
HSG Rodgau Nieder-Roden
31–33 (ET)
DJK Rimpar Wölfe
Sporthalle Nieder-Roden, Rodgau
Attendance: 262
Referees: Jansen, Hellbusch
Kohlstrung 10
(15–18)
Schmidt 7
3× (suspension)
Report
5× (suspension)

FT: 27–27 ET: 4–6

29 August 2021; 15:00	Handball Sport Verein Hamburg	30–25	HC Elbflorenz 2006	Sporthalle Wandsbek, Hamburg; Attendance: 600; Referees: Tönnies, Schulze
29 August 2021; 15:00	Weller 10	(14–14)	Wucherpfennig 7	Sporthalle Wandsbek, Hamburg; Attendance: 600; Referees: Tönnies, Schulze
29 August 2021; 15:00	1× (yellow card) 5× (suspension)	Report	5× (suspension) 1× (red card)	Sporthalle Wandsbek, Hamburg; Attendance: 600; Referees: Tönnies, Schulze

29 August 2021; 16:00	VfL Lübeck-Schwartau	31–35	ThSV Eisenach	Hansehalle, Lübeck; Attendance: 307; Referees: Gimmler, Rips
29 August 2021; 16:00	Klíma, Versteijnen 6	(11–18)	Hangstein 10	Hansehalle, Lübeck; Attendance: 307; Referees: Gimmler, Rips
29 August 2021; 16:00	5× (suspension)	Report	5× (suspension)	Hansehalle, Lübeck; Attendance: 307; Referees: Gimmler, Rips

29 August 2021; 17:00	HC Oppenweiler/Backnang	25–32	TV Hüttenberg	Gemeindehalle Oppenweiler, Oppenweiler; Attendance: 199; Referees: Kuschel, Senk
29 August 2021; 17:00	Lenz 8	(15–19)	Mappes 10	Gemeindehalle Oppenweiler, Oppenweiler; Attendance: 199; Referees: Kuschel, Senk
29 August 2021; 17:00	1× (yellow card) 2× (suspension)	Report	2× (yellow card) 3× (suspension)	Gemeindehalle Oppenweiler, Oppenweiler; Attendance: 199; Referees: Kuschel, Senk

== Round 2 ==
The draw was held on 4 September 2021. The matches were played between 5 and 21 October 2021. The finalists of the Amateurpokal entered this round.

5 October 2021; 19:00	TSG Friesenheim	23–24	GWD Minden	Friedrich-Ebert-Halle, Ludwigshafen; Attendance: 743; Referees: Thiyagarajah, Thiyagarajah
5 October 2021; 19:00	Hofmann 6	(9–12)	Darmoul, Jukić 6	Friedrich-Ebert-Halle, Ludwigshafen; Attendance: 743; Referees: Thiyagarajah, Thiyagarajah
5 October 2021; 19:00	2× (yellow card) 3× (suspension)	Report	3× (suspension)	Friedrich-Ebert-Halle, Ludwigshafen; Attendance: 743; Referees: Thiyagarajah, Thiyagarajah

5 October 2021; 19:00	SC DHfK Leipzig Handball	24–31	Rhein-Neckar Löwen	Arena Leipzig, Leipzig; Attendance: 2,537; Referees: Loppaschewski, Blümel
5 October 2021; 19:00	Gębala, Ivić 4	(12–15)	Gensheimer 8	Arena Leipzig, Leipzig; Attendance: 2,537; Referees: Loppaschewski, Blümel
5 October 2021; 19:00	2× (suspension)	Report	1× (yellow card) 3× (suspension)	Arena Leipzig, Leipzig; Attendance: 2,537; Referees: Loppaschewski, Blümel

5 October 2021; 19:30	TSV Bayer Dormagen	28–31	TBV Lemgo	TSV Sportcenter, Dormagen; Attendance: 833; Referees: Standke, Heine
5 October 2021; 19:30	Meuser 8	(17–16)	Elísson 16	TSV Sportcenter, Dormagen; Attendance: 833; Referees: Standke, Heine
5 October 2021; 19:30	1× (yellow card) 3× (suspension)	Report	1× (yellow card) 2× (suspension)	TSV Sportcenter, Dormagen; Attendance: 833; Referees: Standke, Heine

5 October 2021; 19:30	SG VTB/Altjührden	18–36	Bergischer HC	Sportplatz Altjührden, Varel; Attendance: 314; Referees: Klinke, Klinke
5 October 2021; 19:30	three players 3	(7–17)	Damm 5	Sportplatz Altjührden, Varel; Attendance: 314; Referees: Klinke, Klinke
5 October 2021; 19:30	3× (suspension)	Report	1× (suspension)	Sportplatz Altjührden, Varel; Attendance: 314; Referees: Klinke, Klinke

5 October 2021; 20:00	SG Langenfeld	19–42	TSV Hannover-Burgdorf	Konrad-Adenauer-Gymnasium, Langenfeld; Attendance: 350; Referees: Frank, Bona
5 October 2021; 20:00	Hambrock, Preissegger 2	(8–20)	Plógv Hansen 7	Konrad-Adenauer-Gymnasium, Langenfeld; Attendance: 350; Referees: Frank, Bona
5 October 2021; 20:00	1× (yellow card) 4× (suspension)	Report	3× (suspension)	Konrad-Adenauer-Gymnasium, Langenfeld; Attendance: 350; Referees: Frank, Bona

5 October 2021; 20:00	DJK Rimpar Wölfe	26–34	TV Bittenfeld	s.Oliver Arena, Würzburg; Attendance: 177; Referees: Kinzel, Grobe
5 October 2021; 20:00	Schmidt 6	(15–14)	Lönn 7	s.Oliver Arena, Würzburg; Attendance: 177; Referees: Kinzel, Grobe
5 October 2021; 20:00	1× (yellow card) 3× (suspension)	Report	1× (yellow card) 1× (suspension)	s.Oliver Arena, Würzburg; Attendance: 177; Referees: Kinzel, Grobe

6 October 2021; 19:00	EHV Aue	26–38	THW Kiel	Erzgebirgshalle Lößnitz, Aue; Attendance: 1,453; Referees: Krag, Hurst
6 October 2021; 19:00	Bornhorn 6	(12–17)	Bilyk 8	Erzgebirgshalle Lößnitz, Aue; Attendance: 1,453; Referees: Krag, Hurst
6 October 2021; 19:00	2× (yellow card) 4× (suspension)	Report	1× (yellow card) 3× (suspension)	Erzgebirgshalle Lößnitz, Aue; Attendance: 1,453; Referees: Krag, Hurst

6 October 2021; 19:00	Handball Sport Verein Hamburg	28–29	Füchse Berlin	Barclaycard Arena, Hamburg; Attendance: 1,895; Referees: Koppl, Regner
6 October 2021; 19:00	Valiullin 9	(14–17)	Lindberg 7	Barclaycard Arena, Hamburg; Attendance: 1,895; Referees: Koppl, Regner
6 October 2021; 19:00	1× (yellow card) 4× (suspension) 1× (red card)	Report	2× (yellow card) 5× (suspension)	Barclaycard Arena, Hamburg; Attendance: 1,895; Referees: Koppl, Regner

6 October 2021; 19:00	SG BBM Bietigheim	28–30	MT Melsungen	Sporthalle am Viadukt, Bietigheim-Bissingen; Attendance: 632; Referees: Jansen, Hellbusch
6 October 2021; 19:00	Fischer, Pfeifer 6	(10–16)	Kühn 6	Sporthalle am Viadukt, Bietigheim-Bissingen; Attendance: 632; Referees: Jansen, Hellbusch
6 October 2021; 19:00	1× (yellow card) 3× (suspension)	Report	2× (suspension)	Sporthalle am Viadukt, Bietigheim-Bissingen; Attendance: 632; Referees: Jansen, Hellbusch

6 October 2021; 19:15	ASV Hamm-Westfalen	33–29	TV Grosswallstadt	Westpress Arena, Hamm; Attendance: 467; Referees: Dorff, Dorff
6 October 2021; 19:15	Huesmann 7	(15–15)	Savvas 7	Westpress Arena, Hamm; Attendance: 467; Referees: Dorff, Dorff
6 October 2021; 19:15	2× (yellow card) 4× (suspension)	Report	1× (yellow card) 3× (suspension)	Westpress Arena, Hamm; Attendance: 467; Referees: Dorff, Dorff

6 October 2021; 19:30	TV Hüttenberg	26–40	Frisch Auf Göppingen	Sportzentrum Hüttenberg, Hüttenberg; Attendance: 462; Referees: Hannes, Hannes
6 October 2021; 19:30	Weber 7	(11–20)	Heymann 8	Sportzentrum Hüttenberg, Hüttenberg; Attendance: 462; Referees: Hannes, Hannes
6 October 2021; 19:30	1× (yellow card) 3× (suspension)	Report	1× (yellow card) 6× (suspension)	Sportzentrum Hüttenberg, Hüttenberg; Attendance: 462; Referees: Hannes, Hannes

6 October 2021; 19:30	HC Erlangen	29–26	SG Flensburg-Handewitt	Arena Nürnberger Versicherung, Nuremberg; Attendance: 1,853; Referees: Baumgart, Wild
6 October 2021; 19:30	Steinert 9	(16–12)	Semper 6	Arena Nürnberger Versicherung, Nuremberg; Attendance: 1,853; Referees: Baumgart, Wild
6 October 2021; 19:30	1× (yellow card) 1× (suspension)	Report	1× (yellow card) 3× (suspension)	Arena Nürnberger Versicherung, Nuremberg; Attendance: 1,853; Referees: Baumgart, Wild

6 October 2021; 19:30	HSG Nordhorn-Lingen	29–25	HBW Balingen-Weilstetten	EmslandArena, Lingen; Attendance: 810; Referees: Otto, Piper
6 October 2021; 19:30	Weber 7	(12–11)	Thomann 5	EmslandArena, Lingen; Attendance: 810; Referees: Otto, Piper
6 October 2021; 19:30	1× (yellow card) 5× (suspension) 1× (red card)	Report	1× (yellow card) 4× (suspension)	EmslandArena, Lingen; Attendance: 810; Referees: Otto, Piper

6 October 2021; 20:00	ThSV Eisenach	25–29	HSG Wetzlar	Werner-Aßmann-Halle, Eisenach; Attendance: 825; Referees: Schneider, Hartmann
6 October 2021; 20:00	Hangstein, Saul 5	(14–13)	Čavor 7	Werner-Aßmann-Halle, Eisenach; Attendance: 825; Referees: Schneider, Hartmann
6 October 2021; 20:00	2× (yellow card) 4× (suspension)	Report	2× (yellow card) 3× (suspension)	Werner-Aßmann-Halle, Eisenach; Attendance: 825; Referees: Schneider, Hartmann

7 October 2021; 19:30	VfL Gummersbach	30–22	TuS Ferndorf	Schwalbe-Arena, Gummersbach; Attendance: 1,103; Referees: Schmidt, Linker
7 October 2021; 19:30	Božović 6	(14–14)	Bornemann 9	Schwalbe-Arena, Gummersbach; Attendance: 1,103; Referees: Schmidt, Linker
7 October 2021; 19:30	1× (yellow card) 4× (suspension)	Report	1× (yellow card) 4× (suspension)	Schwalbe-Arena, Gummersbach; Attendance: 1,103; Referees: Schmidt, Linker

21 October 2021; 18:00	TuS Nettelstedt-Lübbecke	23–30	SC Magdeburg	Merkur Arena, Lübbecke; Attendance: 536; Referees: Baumgart, Wild
21 October 2021; 18:00	Skroblien 8	(12–14)	Mertens 6	Merkur Arena, Lübbecke; Attendance: 536; Referees: Baumgart, Wild
21 October 2021; 18:00	1× (yellow card) 4× (suspension)	Report	1× (yellow card) 2× (suspension)	Merkur Arena, Lübbecke; Attendance: 536; Referees: Baumgart, Wild

== Round of 16 ==
The draw was held on 22 October 2021. The matches were played on 14, 15 and 21 December 2021.

14 December 2021
18:15
TBV Lemgo
32–29 (ET)
Füchse Berlin
Lipperlandhalle, Lemgo
Attendance: 1,821
Referees: Koppl, Regner
Elísson 13
(12–15)
Lindberg 9
4× (suspension)
Report
1× (yellow card) 6× (suspension)

FT: 25–25 ET: 7–4

14 December 2021; 19:00	VfL Gummersbach	38–26	HSG Nordhorn-Lingen	Schwalbe-Arena, Gummersbach; Attendance: 980; Referees: Jansen, Hellbusch
14 December 2021; 19:00	Styrmisson 7	(19–11)	Pohle 6	Schwalbe-Arena, Gummersbach; Attendance: 980; Referees: Jansen, Hellbusch
14 December 2021; 19:00	1× (yellow card) 2× (suspension)	Report	1× (yellow card) 4× (suspension)	Schwalbe-Arena, Gummersbach; Attendance: 980; Referees: Jansen, Hellbusch

14 December 2021; 19:30	HC Erlangen	31–19	HSG Wetzlar	Arena Nürnberger Versicherung, Nuremberg; Attendance: 340; Referees: Kolb, Kauth
14 December 2021; 19:30	Sellin 6	(12–9)	Holst 6	Arena Nürnberger Versicherung, Nuremberg; Attendance: 340; Referees: Kolb, Kauth
14 December 2021; 19:30	6× (suspension)	Report	4× (suspension)	Arena Nürnberger Versicherung, Nuremberg; Attendance: 340; Referees: Kolb, Kauth

15 December 2021; 19:00	Rhein-Neckar Löwen	35–30	TV Bittenfeld	SAP Arena, Mannheim; Attendance: 750; Referees: Tönnies, Schulze
15 December 2021; 19:00	Schmid 10	(18–17)	Zieker 7	SAP Arena, Mannheim; Attendance: 750; Referees: Tönnies, Schulze
15 December 2021; 19:00	4× (suspension)	Report	1× (suspension) 1× (red card)	SAP Arena, Mannheim; Attendance: 750; Referees: Tönnies, Schulze

15 December 2021
19:00
TSV Hannover-Burgdorf
28–30 (ET)
THW Kiel
ZAG-Arena, Hanover
Attendance: 2,054
Referees: Kinzel, Grobe
Martinović 9
(13–12)
three players 5
1× (yellow card) 6× (suspension)
Report
5× (suspension)

FT: 25–25 ET: 3–5

15 December 2021; 19:30	GWD Minden	31–28	Frisch Auf Göppingen	Kampa-Halle, Minden; Attendance: 365; Referees: Fedtke, Wienrich
15 December 2021; 19:30	Urban 11	(20–13)	Schiller 7	Kampa-Halle, Minden; Attendance: 365; Referees: Fedtke, Wienrich
15 December 2021; 19:30	3× (suspension)	Report	1× (yellow card) 4× (suspension)	Kampa-Halle, Minden; Attendance: 365; Referees: Fedtke, Wienrich

15 December 2021; 19:30	MT Melsungen	28–22	Bergischer HC	Rothenbach-Halle, Melsungen; Attendance: 1,378; Referees: Schneider, Hartmann
15 December 2021; 19:30	Kühn 7	(16–12)	Gunnarsson 6	Rothenbach-Halle, Melsungen; Attendance: 1,378; Referees: Schneider, Hartmann
15 December 2021; 19:30	2× (yellow card) 1× (suspension)	Report	2× (yellow card) 1× (suspension)	Rothenbach-Halle, Melsungen; Attendance: 1,378; Referees: Schneider, Hartmann

21 December 2021; 19:15	ASV Hamm-Westfalen	26–31	SC Magdeburg	Westpress Arena, Hamm; Attendance: 1,495; Referees: Standke, Heine
21 December 2021; 19:15	Von Boenigk 5	(14–13)	Damgaard, Pettersson 6	Westpress Arena, Hamm; Attendance: 1,495; Referees: Standke, Heine
21 December 2021; 19:15	1× (yellow card) 2× (suspension)	Report		Westpress Arena, Hamm; Attendance: 1,495; Referees: Standke, Heine

== Quarterfinals ==
The draw was held on 17 December 2021. The matches were played on 5 and 6 February 2022.

5 February 2022; 18:00	VfL Gummersbach	27–29	HC Erlangen	Schwalbe-Arena, Gummersbach; Attendance: 1,240; Referees: Koppl, Regner
5 February 2022; 18:00	Santos 7	(16–12)	Jeppsson 8	Schwalbe-Arena, Gummersbach; Attendance: 1,240; Referees: Koppl, Regner
5 February 2022; 18:00	1× (yellow card) 3× (suspension)	Report	1× (yellow card) 3× (suspension)	Schwalbe-Arena, Gummersbach; Attendance: 1,240; Referees: Koppl, Regner

6 February 2022; 16:00	SC Magdeburg	34–26	GWD Minden	GETEC Arena, Magdeburg; Attendance: 2,058; Referees: Otto, Piper
6 February 2022; 16:00	Smits 9	(18–11)	Damgaard 8	GETEC Arena, Magdeburg; Attendance: 2,058; Referees: Otto, Piper
6 February 2022; 16:00	1× (yellow card)	Report	1× (yellow card) 4× (suspension)	GETEC Arena, Magdeburg; Attendance: 2,058; Referees: Otto, Piper

6 February 2022; 18:00	Rhein-Neckar Löwen	24–26	THW Kiel	SNP Dome, Heidelberg; Attendance: 2,500; Referees: Kuttler, Merz
6 February 2022; 18:00	Gensheimer 6	(13–12)	Ekberg, Sagosen 6	SNP Dome, Heidelberg; Attendance: 2,500; Referees: Kuttler, Merz
6 February 2022; 18:00	2× (yellow card) 3× (suspension)	Report	3× (suspension)	SNP Dome, Heidelberg; Attendance: 2,500; Referees: Kuttler, Merz

6 March 2022; 18:30	TBV Lemgo	28–24	MT Melsungen	Lipperlandhalle, Lemgo; Attendance: 2,408; Referees: Krag, Hurst
6 March 2022; 18:30	Elísson 10	(15–10)	Kühn 8	Lipperlandhalle, Lemgo; Attendance: 2,408; Referees: Krag, Hurst
6 March 2022; 18:30	1× (yellow card)	Report	1× (suspension)	Lipperlandhalle, Lemgo; Attendance: 2,408; Referees: Krag, Hurst

== Final four ==
The draw was held on 8 February 2022. The matches were played on 23 and 24 April 2022.

=== Bracket ===
Semi-finals
23 April
THW Kiel	28
TBV Lemgo	26
23 April
SC Magdeburg	30
HC Erlangen	22

Final
24 April
THW Kiel	28
SC Magdeburg	21

=== Semifinals ===
23 April 2022; 13:30	THW Kiel	28–26	TBV Lemgo	Barclaycard Arena, Hamburg; Attendance: 12,800; Referees: Tönnies, Schulze
23 April 2022; 13:30	Sagosen 8	(12–12)	Elísson 7	Barclaycard Arena, Hamburg; Attendance: 12,800; Referees: Tönnies, Schulze
23 April 2022; 13:30	1× (suspension)	Report	1× (yellow card) 1× (suspension)	Barclaycard Arena, Hamburg; Attendance: 12,800; Referees: Tönnies, Schulze

23 April 2022; 16:10	SC Magdeburg	30–22	HC Erlangen	Barclaycard Arena, Hamburg; Attendance: 12,800; Referees: Kinzel, Grobe
23 April 2022; 16:10	Magnússon 6	(17–13)	Jeppsson 6	Barclaycard Arena, Hamburg; Attendance: 12,800; Referees: Kinzel, Grobe
23 April 2022; 16:10	1× (yellow card) 3× (suspension)	Report	1× (yellow card) 5× (suspension)	Barclaycard Arena, Hamburg; Attendance: 12,800; Referees: Kinzel, Grobe

=== Final ===
24 April 2022; 13:25	THW Kiel	28–21	SC Magdeburg	Barclaycard Arena, Hamburg; Attendance: 13,200; Referees: Baumgart, Wild
24 April 2022; 13:25	Sagosen 7	(12–13)	Magnússon 7	Barclaycard Arena, Hamburg; Attendance: 13,200; Referees: Baumgart, Wild
24 April 2022; 13:25	1× (yellow card) 5× (suspension)	Report	1× (yellow card) 3× (suspension)	Barclaycard Arena, Hamburg; Attendance: 13,200; Referees: Baumgart, Wild
