= 2018–19 DHB-Pokal =

The 2018–19 DHB-Pokal was the 43rd edition of the tournament.

THW Kiel won the cup for the eleventh time.

== Format ==
The first round was split in a north and a south part and played in mini tournaments where only the winner advanced to the round of 16. From there on a knockout system was used to determine the winner. The final four was played on one weekend in Hamburg.

== Round 1 ==
The draw was held on 19 June 2018. The matches were played on 18 and 19 August 2018 with a semifinal and final. The winner of each tournament advanced to the round of 16.

Team 1	Score	Team 2
North
Göttingen
THW Kiel	39–23	TUSEM Essen
TSV Bayer Dormagen	36–25	Northeimer HC
THW Kiel	44–27	TSV Bayer Dormagen
Spenge
Leichlinger TV	26–45	SC DHfK Leipzig
Dessau-Roßlauer HV	29–26	TuS Spenge
SC DHfK Leipzig	26–25	Dessau-Roßlauer HV
Wilhelmshaven
HSV Hamburg	24–37	GWD Minden
1. VfL Potsdam	30–34	Wilhelmshavener HV
GWD Minden	27–23	Wilhelmshavener HV
Altenholz
TSV Hannover-Burgdorf	30–23	VfL Eintracht Hagen
Mecklenburger Stiere Schwerin	30–34	TSV Altenholz
TSV Hannover-Burgdorf	24–27	TSV Altenholz
Halver
HSG Nordhorn-Lingen	19–28	SG Flensburg-Handewitt
TuS Ferndorf	26–23	SG Schalksmühle-Halver
SG Flensburg-Handewitt	30–22	TuS Ferndorf
Emsdetten
Oranienburger HC	23–37	Füchse Berlin
TV Emsdetten	34–35 (OT)	TuS Nettelstedt-Lübbecke
Füchse Berlin	33–26	TuS Nettelstedt-Lübbecke
Neustadt
HSG Krefled	25–29	ASV Hamm-Westfalen
HSG Ostsee N/G	26–37	TBV Lemgo
ASV Hamm-Westfalen	25–31	TBV Lemgo
Hildesheim
Handball Hannover-Burgwedel	18–26	Eintracht Hildesheim
SC Magdeburg	31–17	VfL Lübeck-Schwartau
Eintracht Hildesheim	18–35	SC Magdeburg

Team 1	Score	Team 2
South
Fürstenfeldbruck
TV Hüttenberg	29–26	HC Elbflorenz 2006
Rhein-Neckar Löwen	43–19	TuS Fürstenfeldbruck
TV Hüttenberg	29–38	Rhein-Neckar Löwen
Kornwestheim
SV Salamander Kornwestheim	27–35	HSC 2000 Coburg
VfL Gummersbach	29–15	SG Leutershausen
HSC 2000 Coburg	23–27	VfL Gummersbach
Weilheim/Teck
TSG Haßloch	18–28	HBW Balingen-Weilstetten
Frisch Auf Göppingen	34–23	HSG Konstanz
HBW Balingen-Weilstetten	24–25	Frisch Auf Göppingen
Melsungen
Longericher SC	25–33	ThSV Eisenach
HC Rhein Vikings	22–33	MT Melsungen
ThSV Eisenach	19–37	MT Melsungen
Hanau
HC Erlangen	38–18	MSG Groß-Bieberau/Modau
SG BBM Bietigheim	33–32	HSG Hanau
HC Erlangen	34–20	SG BBM Bietigheim
Lößnitz
EHV Aue	23–21	HSG Rodgau Nieder-Roden
TV Grosswallstadt	24–30	HSG Wetzlar
EHV Aue	18–28	HSG Wetzlar
Heilbronn
TSB Heilbronn-Horkheim	28–26	HG Oftersheim/Schwetzingen
TV Bittenfeld	26–29	DJK Rimpar Wölfe
TSB Heilbronn-Horkheim	23–25	DJK Rimpar Wölfe
Pfullingen
TSG Friesenheim	28–29	VfL Pfullingen
HG Saarlouis	11–36	Bergischer HC
VfL Pfullingen	22–35	Bergischer HC

== Round of 16 ==
The draw was held on 22 August 2018. The match from Berlin was moved forward to 16 September due to their involvement in the 2018 IHF Super Globe, the other matches will be played on 16 and 17 October 2018.

16 September 2018; 17:30	GWD Minden	26–31	Füchse Berlin	Kampa-Halle, Minden; Attendance: 1,151; Referees: Hurst, Krag
16 September 2018; 17:30	Rambo 9	(9–17)	Simak 8	Kampa-Halle, Minden; Attendance: 1,151; Referees: Hurst, Krag
16 September 2018; 17:30	2× (yellow card) 1× (suspension)	Report	2× (yellow card) 3× (suspension)	Kampa-Halle, Minden; Attendance: 1,151; Referees: Hurst, Krag

16 October 2018; 19:00	TSV Hannover-Burgdorf	23–17	TBV Lemgo	AWD Hall, Hanover; Attendance: 2,649; Referees: Geipel, Helbig
16 October 2018; 19:00	Kastening, Olsen 6	(11–11)	Bartok 4	AWD Hall, Hanover; Attendance: 2,649; Referees: Geipel, Helbig
16 October 2018; 19:00	1× (yellow card) 4× (suspension)	Report	1× (yellow card)	AWD Hall, Hanover; Attendance: 2,649; Referees: Geipel, Helbig

16 October 2018
19:30
Bergischer HC
29–32 (ET)
Rhein-Neckar Löwen
Klingenhalle, Solingen
Attendance: 2,487
Referees: Thiyagarajah, Thiyagarajah
Arnesson 7
(11–13)
Schmid 11
3× (yellow card) 3× (suspension)
Report
3× (yellow card) 2× (suspension)

FT: 24–24 ET: 5–8

16 October 2018; 20:00	HSG Wetzlar	20–28	MT Melsungen	Rittal Arena Wetzlar, Wetzlar; Attendance: 2,820; Referees: Fasthoff, Behrens
16 October 2018; 20:00	Holst, Rüdiger 5	(8–13)	Kühn 5	Rittal Arena Wetzlar, Wetzlar; Attendance: 2,820; Referees: Fasthoff, Behrens
16 October 2018; 20:00	2× (yellow card) 4× (suspension)	Report	2× (yellow card) 2× (suspension)	Rittal Arena Wetzlar, Wetzlar; Attendance: 2,820; Referees: Fasthoff, Behrens

17 October 2018; 19:00	VfL Gummersbach	24–25	Frisch Auf Göppingen	Schwalbe-Arena, Gummersbach; Attendance: 2,036; Referees: Blümel, Loppaschewski
17 October 2018; 19:00	Norouzinejad 9	(13–11)	Heymann 6	Schwalbe-Arena, Gummersbach; Attendance: 2,036; Referees: Blümel, Loppaschewski
17 October 2018; 19:00	3× (yellow card) 5× (suspension)	Report	3× (yellow card) 5× (suspension)	Schwalbe-Arena, Gummersbach; Attendance: 2,036; Referees: Blümel, Loppaschewski

17 October 2018; 19:00	SG Flensburg-Handewitt	28–31	SC Magdeburg	Flens-Arena, Flensburg; Attendance: 5,330; Referees: Brodbeck, Reich
17 October 2018; 19:00	Wanne 7	(15–16)	Weber 8	Flens-Arena, Flensburg; Attendance: 5,330; Referees: Brodbeck, Reich
17 October 2018; 19:00	2× (yellow card) 5× (suspension)	Report	3× (yellow card) 3× (suspension)	Flens-Arena, Flensburg; Attendance: 5,330; Referees: Brodbeck, Reich

17 October 2018; 19:30	THW Kiel	31–23	SC DHfK Leipzig	Sparkassen-Arena, Kiel; Attendance: 6,731; Referees: Grobe, Kinzel
17 October 2018; 19:30	Nilsson 8	(15–8)	Weber 8	Sparkassen-Arena, Kiel; Attendance: 6,731; Referees: Grobe, Kinzel
17 October 2018; 19:30	3× (yellow card) 3× (suspension)	Report	3× (yellow card) 3× (suspension)	Sparkassen-Arena, Kiel; Attendance: 6,731; Referees: Grobe, Kinzel

17 October 2018; 20:00	DJK Rimpar Wölfe	21–26	HC Erlangen	s.Oliver Arena, Würzburg; Attendance: 1,676; Referees: Schneider, Hartmann
17 October 2018; 20:00	Backs, Sauer 4	(10–14)	Sellin 8	s.Oliver Arena, Würzburg; Attendance: 1,676; Referees: Schneider, Hartmann
17 October 2018; 20:00	3× (yellow card) 3× (suspension)	Report	3× (yellow card) 4× (suspension)	s.Oliver Arena, Würzburg; Attendance: 1,676; Referees: Schneider, Hartmann

== Quarterfinals ==
The draw was held on 18 October 2018. The matches will be played on 27 November and 18 and 19 December 2018.

27 November 2018; 19:00	THW Kiel	31–19	MT Melsungen	Sparkassen-Arena, Kiel; Attendance: 5,800; Referees: Fasthoff, Behrens
27 November 2018; 19:00	Ekberg 7	(19–8)	Reichmann 5	Sparkassen-Arena, Kiel; Attendance: 5,800; Referees: Fasthoff, Behrens
27 November 2018; 19:00	2× (yellow card)	Report	3× (yellow card)	Sparkassen-Arena, Kiel; Attendance: 5,800; Referees: Fasthoff, Behrens

18 December 2018
18:00
Füchse Berlin
37–35 (ET)
Rhein-Neckar Löwen
Max-Schmeling-Halle, Berlin
Attendance: 6,405
Referees: Schulze, Tönnies
three players 7
(14–17)
Larsen 10
2× (yellow card) 4× (suspension)
Report
1× (yellow card) 8× (suspension) 2× (red card)

FT: 30–30 ET: 7–5

18 December 2018; 19:00	TSV Hannover-Burgdorf	33–29	HC Erlangen	TUI Arena, Hanover; Attendance: 4,348; Referees: Geipel, Helbig
18 December 2018; 19:00	Brozović, Ugalde 7	(16–14)	Steinert 8	TUI Arena, Hanover; Attendance: 4,348; Referees: Geipel, Helbig
18 December 2018; 19:00	3× (yellow card) 4× (suspension)	Report	2× (yellow card) 4× (suspension) 1× (red card)	TUI Arena, Hanover; Attendance: 4,348; Referees: Geipel, Helbig

19 December 2018; 19:00	SC Magdeburg	40–27	Frisch Auf Göppingen	GETEC Arena, Magdeburg; Attendance: 6,372; Referees: Hurst, Krag
19 December 2018; 19:00	Musche 10	(21–12)	Rentschler 6	GETEC Arena, Magdeburg; Attendance: 6,372; Referees: Hurst, Krag
19 December 2018; 19:00	3× (yellow card) 4× (suspension)	Report	2× (yellow card) 4× (suspension)	GETEC Arena, Magdeburg; Attendance: 6,372; Referees: Hurst, Krag

== Final four ==
The draw was held on 8 January 2019. The matches were played on 6 and 7 April 2019.

=== Bracket ===
Semifinals
6 April
TSV Hannover-Burgdorf	28
SC Magdeburg	29
6 April
THW Kiel	24
Füchse Berlin	22

Final
7 April
SC Magdeburg	24
THW Kiel	28

=== Semifinals ===
6 April 2019; 15:50	TSV Hannover-Burgdorf	28–29	SC Magdeburg	Barclaycard Arena, Hamburg; Attendance: 13,200; Referees: Immel, Klein
6 April 2019; 15:50	Olsen 7	(11–15)	Damgaard 16	Barclaycard Arena, Hamburg; Attendance: 13,200; Referees: Immel, Klein
6 April 2019; 15:50	2× (yellow card) 1× (suspension) 1× (red card)	Report	3× (yellow card) 3× (suspension)	Barclaycard Arena, Hamburg; Attendance: 13,200; Referees: Immel, Klein

6 April 2019; 18:30	THW Kiel	24–22	Füchse Berlin	Barclaycard Arena, Hamburg; Attendance: 13,200; Referees: Tönnies, Schulze
6 April 2019; 18:30	Duvnjak, Ekberg 6	(13–7)	Wiede 6	Barclaycard Arena, Hamburg; Attendance: 13,200; Referees: Tönnies, Schulze
6 April 2019; 18:30	6× (yellow card) 2× (suspension) 1× (red card)	Report	5× (yellow card) 3× (suspension)	Barclaycard Arena, Hamburg; Attendance: 13,200; Referees: Tönnies, Schulze

=== Final ===
7 April 2019; 15:10	SC Magdeburg	24–28	THW Kiel	Barclaycard Arena, Hamburg; Attendance: 13,200; Referees: Baumgart, Wild
7 April 2019; 15:10	Damgaard 6	(13–14)	Reinkind 6	Barclaycard Arena, Hamburg; Attendance: 13,200; Referees: Baumgart, Wild
7 April 2019; 15:10	2× (yellow card) 1× (suspension)	Report	3× (yellow card) 3× (suspension)	Barclaycard Arena, Hamburg; Attendance: 13,200; Referees: Baumgart, Wild
