= 2020–21 Handball-Bundesliga =

Handball-Bundesliga
- Season: 2020–21
- Dates: 1 October 2020 – 27 June 2021
- Champions: THW Kiel
- Relegated: Die Eulen Ludwigshafen; HSG Nordhorn-Lingen; TUSEM Essen; HSC 2000 Coburg
- Champions League: THW Kiel; SG Flensburg-Handewitt
- EHF European League: SC Magdeburg; Füchse Berlin; TBV Lemgo
- Matches: 380
- Goals: 21,012 (55.29 per match)
- Top goalscorer: Ómar Ingi Magnússon (274 goals)
- Attendance: 91,242 (240 per match) (Note: Due to the COVID-19 pandemic in Germany, each local health department allows a different number of spectators.)

The 2020–21 Handball-Bundesliga was the 56th season of the Handball-Bundesliga, Germany's premier handball league and the 44th season consisting of only one league. Due to the COVID-19 pandemic, the league announced 1 October 2020 as the start date and the season ended on 27 June 2021.

As there were no relegated teams last season, this season is being played with 20 teams.

THW Kiel won their twenty-second overall and second consecutive title.

== Teams ==
Locations of the 2020–21 Handball-Bundesliga teams

=== Team changes ===
Promoted from 2019–20 2. Handball-Bundesliga	Relegated from 2019–20 Handball-Bundesliga
HSC 2000 Coburg; TUSEM Essen	None as season was cancelled.

=== Stadiums ===
Team	Location	Arena	Capacity
Bergischer HC	Wuppertal; Solingen; Düsseldorf	Uni-Halle; Klingenhalle; ISS Dome	3,200; 2,800; 12,500
Füchse Berlin	Berlin	Max-Schmeling-Halle	9,000
HBW Balingen-Weilstetten	Balingen	Sparkassen-Arena; Porsche-Arena	2,300; 6,181
TVB 1898 Stuttgart	Stuttgart	Scharrena Stuttgart; Porsche-Arena	2,251; 6,211
HSC 2000 Coburg	Coburg	HUK-Coburg arena	3,530
HC Erlangen	Nuremberg	Arena Nürnberger Versicherung	8,308
TUSEM Essen	Essen	Sportpark am Hallo	2,500
SG Flensburg-Handewitt	Flensburg	Flens-Arena	6,300
Die Eulen Ludwigshafen	Ludwigshafen	Friedrich-Ebert-Halle	2,350
Frisch Auf Göppingen	Göppingen	EWS Arena	5,600
TSV Hannover-Burgdorf	Hanover	ZAG-Arena; Swiss Life Hall	9,850; 4,460
THW Kiel	Kiel	Wunderino Arena	10,285
SC DHfK Leipzig	Leipzig	Quarterback Immobilien Arena	6,327
TBV Lemgo	Lemgo	Phoenix Contact Arena	4,790
SC Magdeburg	Magdeburg	GETEC Arena	6,600
MT Melsungen	Kassel	Rothenbach-Halle	4,300
GWD Minden	Minden	Kampa-Halle	4,059
HSG Nordhorn-Lingen	Nordhorn; Lingen (Ems)	Euregium; EmslandArena	4,100; 4,995
Rhein-Neckar Löwen	Mannheim	SAP Arena	13,200
HSG Wetzlar	Wetzlar	Rittal Arena Wetzlar	4,421

== Standings ==
Pos	Team	Pld	W	D	L	GF	GA	GD	Pts	Qualification or relegation
1	THW Kiel (C)	38	33	2	3	1212	999	+213	68 (Note: Kiel 57–52 Flensburg)	Champions League
2	SG Flensburg-Handewitt	38	32	4	2	1175	998	+177	68	Champions League
3	SC Magdeburg	38	25	3	10	1151	1013	+138	53	EHF European League
4	Füchse Berlin	38	25	2	11	1093	1003	+90	52	EHF European League
5	Rhein-Neckar Löwen	38	23	4	11	1116	1023	+93	50	
6	SC DHfK Leipzig	38	19	4	15	1017	1019	−2	42 (Note: Leipzig 55–55 Göppingen, Leipzig scored more away goals)	
7	Frisch Auf Göppingen	38	18	6	14	1055	1046	+9	42	
8	MT Melsungen	38	19	3	16	1062	1062	0	41 (Note: Melsungen 8 Pts; Lemgo 4 Pts; Wetzlar 0 Pts)	
9	TBV Lemgo	38	18	5	15	1043	1056	−13	41	EHF European League
10	HSG Wetzlar	38	18	5	15	1078	1034	+44	41	
11	TSV Hannover-Burgdorf	38	15	6	17	1032	1034	−2	36	
12	Bergischer HC	38	16	3	19	1037	1019	+18	35	
13	HC Erlangen	38	15	4	19	1038	1051	−13	34	
14	TVB 1898 Stuttgart	38	14	4	20	1019	1075	−56	32	
15	HBW Balingen-Weilstetten	38	13	3	22	1023	1100	−77	29	
16	GWD Minden	38	10	8	20	989	1051	−62	28	
17	Die Eulen Ludwigshafen (R)	38	10	5	23	927	1018	−91	25	Relegated to 2. Handball-Bundesliga
18	HSG Nordhorn-Lingen (R)	38	7	3	28	964	1112	−148	17	Relegated to 2. Handball-Bundesliga
19	TUSEM Essen (R)	38	7	1	30	1013	1142	−129	15	Relegated to 2. Handball-Bundesliga
20	HSC 2000 Coburg (R)	38	4	3	31	968	1157	−189	11	Relegated to 2. Handball-Bundesliga

Source: DKB
Rules for classification: 1) points; 2) head-to-head points; 3) head-to-head goal difference; 4) head-to-head number of goals scored; 5) goal difference; 6) goals scored.
(C) Champions; (R) Relegated

== Results ==
Home \ Away	BAL	BRG	BER	BIT	COB	ERL	ESS	FLE	FRI	GÖP	HAN	KIE	LEI	LEM	MAG	MEL	MIN	NOR	RNL	WET
HBW Balingen-Weilstetten	—	27–25	19–28	28–30	34–26	24–29	31–28	25–32	26–27	30–31	30–26	22–33	20–20	25–26	26–39	23–25	29–29	35–24	32–30	30–28
Bergischer HC	30–22	—	29–32	30–31	28–24	29–25	35–29	25–30	28–19	29–28	27–23	27–32	29–30	33–26	21–25	23–25	25–24	25–25	26–28	20–22
Füchse Berlin	36–30	29–27	—	31–25	32–20	30–22	30–23	29–33	28–21	34–27	31–27	26–28	27–28	30–24	22–32	32–30	28–25	29–25	23–29	35–28
TVB 1898 Stuttgart	27–23	26–30	25–28	—	23–29	25–27	31–23	30–32	26–29	28–26	31–26	27–34	30–24	26–26	22–32	26–26	30–26	36–24	32–28	24–31
HSC 2000 Coburg	27–27	24–27	25–32	28–26	—	27–26	31–32	25–29	23–23	21–29	26–33	32–37	22–29	23–27	26–28	25–30	24–28	26–29	28–31	30–30
HC Erlangen	32–34	20–25	30–27	34–25	33–28	—	29–24	26–27	19–24	31–28	21–21	25–31	30–22	31–35	30–28	31–21	21–21	35–29	20–26	28–36
TUSEM Essen	33–27	22–32	23–24	27–20	29–27	20–26	—	28–29	27–29	28–32	26–26	27–31	24–26	37–39	26–31	28–35	29–20	26–33	23–33	29–36
SG Flensburg-Handewitt	38–26	29–22	29–33	34–30	32–22	33–23	35–28	—	35–29	30–23	28–24	31–28	29–23	27–27	33–30	36–20	29–24	33–26	26–26	32–24
Die Eulen Ludwigshafen	27–22	28–22	23–34	28–24	22–19	26–30	25–26	20–29	—	25–27	26–27	20–29	27–27	24–25	22–28	27–30	30–24	26–28	24–26	27–27
Frisch Auf Göppingen	28–23	26–26	25–24	27–17	37–29	27–27	35–27	28–28	24–22	—	31–24	28–31	30–33	28–28	21–29	23–30	33–29	26–26	34–32	33–30
TSV Hannover-Burgdorf	25–29	30–30	27–27	23–23	27–23	27–26	30–26	26–33	25–28	31–25	—	29–35	31–28	31–23	27–29	31–23	26–25	31–22	36–30	25–24
THW Kiel	38–34	33–30	32–26	33–28	41–26	36–30	37–25	29–21	29–19	31–23	34–31	—	31–21	33–23	24–24	29–28	41–26	32–22	32–23	31–21
SC DHfK Leipzig	26–18	27–25	24–24	23–25	35–29	30–25	26–23	24–29	27–19	22–25	29–26	26–33	—	32–32	33–29	29–33	24–21	24–21	26–33	32–28
TBV Lemgo	26–32	31–23	23–29	35–29	33–26	24–23	31–23	22–33	24–22	26–26	24–26	25–30	28–23	—	32–27	28–30	29–27	36–29	28–23	28–27
SC Magdeburg	26–28	27–31	29–24	29–30	42–22	36–26	34–28	29–32	37–29	28–22	33–25	34–33	33–34	30–28	—	31–27	29–28	28–20	31–33	27–27
MT Melsungen	24–25	32–31	32–35	28–30	27–32	31–29	35–31	30–32	25–23	31–23	20–28	26–32	31–28	27–21	24–27	—	24–24	33–28	25–26	30–28
GWD Minden	20–27	29–36	31–26	27–27	30–21	30–29	30–29	28–29	24–24	24–23	28–27	30–35	23–20	28–23	25–35	30–30	—	27–27	26–26	24–29
HSG Nordhorn-Lingen	29–27	26–31	20–25	26–29	28–26	30–31	22–19	28–38	27–24	20–29	20–22	29–35	24–28	25–32	26–33	21–29	20–22	—	24–29	29–30
Rhein-Neckar Löwen	36–27	24–23	24–27	30–20	39–24	26–30	33–27	31–31	31–27	31–32	33–28	25–25	23–28	26–18	22–27	31–22	29–27	30–26	—	37–24
HSG Wetzlar	36–26	30–22	29–27	30–25	31–22	28–28	26–30	27–29	29–11	31–32	26–24	31–22	29–26	21–27	24–24	25–33	28–25	35–26	34–32	—

Source: DKB
Legend: Blue = home team win; Yellow = draw; Red = away team win.

== Top goalscorers ==
Rank	Player	Club	Goals	Shots	%
1	(Iceland) Ómar Ingi Magnússon	SC Magdeburg	274	400	69
2	(Germany) Marcel Schiller	Frisch Auf Göppingen	270	378	71
3	(Iceland) Bjarki Már Elísson	TBV Lemgo	254	340	75
4	(Austria) Robert Weber	HSG Nordhorn-Lingen	235	338	69
5	(Sweden) Hampus Wanne	SG Flensburg-Handewitt	230	321	72
6	(Iceland) Viggó Kristjánsson	TVB 1898 Stuttgart	230	371	62
7	(Germany) Julius Kühn	MT Melsungen	211	366	58
8	(Sweden) Niclas Ekberg	THW Kiel	205	264	78
9	(Germany) Florian Billek	HSC 2000 Coburg	204	285	72
10	(Denmark) Hans Lindberg	Füchse Berlin	197	255	77
