= 2016 DHB-Pokal =

The 2016 DHB-Pokal was the 40th edition of the tournament. SC Magdeburg won the tournament, beating SG Flensburg-Handewitt in the final.

== Format ==
The first round was split in a north and a south part and played in mini tournaments where only the winner advanced to the round of 16. From there on a knockout system was used to determine the winner. The final four was played on one weekend in Hamburg.

== Round 1 ==
Games were played on 15 and 16 August 2015.

Team 1	Score	Team 2
Played in Emsdetten
HF Springe	33–34	TV Emsdetten
SG Flensburg-Handewitt	33–14	TV Korschenbroich
TV Emsdetten	19–41	SG Flensburg-Handewitt
Played in Aue
TBV Lemgo	41–26	SG Leutershausen
EHV Aue	35–22	SV 64 Zweibrücken
TBV Lemgo	24–30	EHV Aue
Played in Solingen
TV 1893 Neuhausen	17–28	Bergischer HC
HSG Rodgau Nieder Roden	20–24	TV Hüttenberg
Bergischer HC	26–21	TV Hüttenberg
Played in Rostock
HC Empor Rostock	25–24	HSG Krefeld
HC Elbflorenz Dresden	24–30	TuS Nettelstedt-Lübbecke
HC Empor Rostock	21–26	TuS Nettelstedt-Lübbecke
Played in Hamm
1. VfL Potsdam	20–41	GWD Minden
ASV Hamm-Westfalen	26–24	Wilhelmshavener HV
GWD Minden	21–26	ASV Hamm-Westfalen
Played in Hildesheim
TSV Hannover-Burgdorf	30–28	VfL Lübeck-Schwartau
Dessau-Roßlauer HV 06	23–37	Eintracht Hildesheim
TSV Hannover-Burgdorf	31–27	Eintracht Hildesheim
Played in Lingen
HSV Hannover	24–27	HSG Nordhorn-Lingen
HSV Hamburg	34–23	TuS Ferndorf
HSG Nordhorn-Lingen	30–29	HSV Hamburg
Played in Leipzig
Füchse Berlin	39–25	SG LVB Leipzig
SC DHfK Leipzig	29–18	TSV Altenholz
Füchse Berlin	26–24	SC DHfK Leipzig
Played in Essen
TUSEM Essen	34–25	DHK Flensborg
THW Kiel	39–18	VfL Fredenbeck
TUSEM Essen	22–25	THW Kiel
Played in Coburg
HSG Kleenheim	18–43	HSG Wetzlar
HSC 2000 Coburg	25–24	HSG Konstanz
HSG Wetzlar	25–26	HSC 2000 Coburg
Played in Nußloch
TV Kirchzell	24–35	TSV Bayer Dormagen
HBW Balingen-Weilstetten	38–22	SG Nussloch
TSV Bayer Dormagen	25–28	HBW Balingen-Weilstetten
Played in Saarlouis
Leichlinger TV	35–39	HG Saarlouis
VfL Gummersbach	24–18	HC Erlangen
HG Saarlouis	23–31	VfL Gummersbach
Played in Kornwestheim
TSG Friesenheim	32–19	SV Salamander Konwestheim
TV Bittenfeld	18–27	Rhein-Neckar Löwen
TSG Friesenheim	17–30	Rhein-Neckar Löwen
Played in Eisenach
TSB Heilbronn/Horkheim	30–24	TV Großwallstadt
MT Melsungen	30–18	ThSV Eisenach
TSB Heilbronn/Horkheim	21–35	MT Melsungen
Played in Rimpar
SG BBM Bietigheim	36–26	TV Hochdorf
DJK Rimpar Wölfe	18–28	Frisch Auf Göppingen
SG BBM Bietigheim	25–31	Frisch Auf Göppingen
Played in Hagen
Oranienburger HC	32–33	VfL Eintracht Hagen
SV Henstedt-Ulzburg	23–28	SC Magdeburg
VfL Eintracht Hagen	32–39	SC Magdeburg

== Round 2 ==
The draw was held on 6 September 2015.

27 October 2015; 19:30	HBW Balingen-Weilstetten	25–29	Frisch Auf Göppingen	SparkassenArena, Balingen; Attendance: 1,850; Referees: Wild, Baumgart (GER)
27 October 2015; 19:30	Wilke 9	(13–15)	Kraus 8	SparkassenArena, Balingen; Attendance: 1,850; Referees: Wild, Baumgart (GER)
27 October 2015; 19:30	4× (yellow card) 2× (suspension)	Report	2× (yellow card) 4× (suspension)	SparkassenArena, Balingen; Attendance: 1,850; Referees: Wild, Baumgart (GER)

28 October 2015; 19:00	Rhein-Neckar Löwen	29–23	Füchse Berlin	Friedrich-Ebert-Halle, Ludwigshafen; Attendance: 1,731; Referees: Schneider, Hartmann (GER)
28 October 2015; 19:00	González 6	(16–13)	Nielsen, Nenadić 4	Friedrich-Ebert-Halle, Ludwigshafen; Attendance: 1,731; Referees: Schneider, Hartmann (GER)
28 October 2015; 19:00	3× (yellow card) 1× (suspension)	Report	3× (yellow card) 1× (suspension)	Friedrich-Ebert-Halle, Ludwigshafen; Attendance: 1,731; Referees: Schneider, Hartmann (GER)

28 October 2015; 19:00	EHV Aue	22–28	GWD Minden	Erzgebirgshalle, Aue; Attendance: 1,350; Referees: Helbig, Geipel (GER)
28 October 2015; 19:00	Roch 6	(13–12)	Sjöstrand 7	Erzgebirgshalle, Aue; Attendance: 1,350; Referees: Helbig, Geipel (GER)
28 October 2015; 19:00	3× (yellow card) 2× (suspension)	Report	3× (yellow card) 2× (suspension)	Erzgebirgshalle, Aue; Attendance: 1,350; Referees: Helbig, Geipel (GER)

28 October 2015; 19:00	TSV Hannover-Burgdorf	22–28	MT Melsungen	Swiss-Life-Hall, Hannover; Attendance: 2,246; Referees: Holm, Brauer (GER)
28 October 2015; 19:00	Häfner 7	(11–15)	Rnić, Sellin 7	Swiss-Life-Hall, Hannover; Attendance: 2,246; Referees: Holm, Brauer (GER)
28 October 2015; 19:00	2× (yellow card) 3× (suspension)	Report	3× (yellow card) 2× (suspension)	Swiss-Life-Hall, Hannover; Attendance: 2,246; Referees: Holm, Brauer (GER)

28 October 2015; 19:00	TuS Nettelstedt-Lübbecke	34–39	SC Magdeburg	Kreissporthalle, Lübbecke; Attendance: 848; Referees: vom Dorff, vom Dorff (GER)
28 October 2015; 19:00	Borozan 8	(15–20)	Van Olphen 6	Kreissporthalle, Lübbecke; Attendance: 848; Referees: vom Dorff, vom Dorff (GER)
28 October 2015; 19:00	1× (yellow card) 3× (suspension)	Report	3× (yellow card) 2× (suspension)	Kreissporthalle, Lübbecke; Attendance: 848; Referees: vom Dorff, vom Dorff (GER)

28 October 2015; 19:00	VfL Gummersbach	19–36	SG Flensburg-Handewitt	Schwalbe-Arena, Gummersbach; Attendance: 2,080; Referees: Pritschow, Pritschow (GER)
28 October 2015; 19:00	three players 3	(9–18)	Eggert 9	Schwalbe-Arena, Gummersbach; Attendance: 2,080; Referees: Pritschow, Pritschow (GER)
28 October 2015; 19:00	4× (yellow card) 4× (suspension)	Report	2× (yellow card) 2× (suspension)	Schwalbe-Arena, Gummersbach; Attendance: 2,080; Referees: Pritschow, Pritschow (GER)

28 October 2015; 19:30	HSG Nordhorn-Lingen	19–24	Bergischer HC	Euregium, Nordhorn; Attendance: 2,510; Referees: Klein, Immel (GER)
28 October 2015; 19:30	Verjans 7	(7–11)	Oelze 7	Euregium, Nordhorn; Attendance: 2,510; Referees: Klein, Immel (GER)
28 October 2015; 19:30	4× (yellow card) 7× (suspension) 2× (red card)	Report	3× (yellow card) 4× (suspension) 1× (red card)	Euregium, Nordhorn; Attendance: 2,510; Referees: Klein, Immel (GER)

28 October 2015; 20:15	HSC 2000 Coburg	23–27	THW Kiel	HUK-Coburg Arena, Coburg; Attendance: 3,530; Referees: Maier, Kilp (GER)
28 October 2015; 20:15	Gerlich 7	(9–16)	Cañellas 6	HUK-Coburg Arena, Coburg; Attendance: 3,530; Referees: Maier, Kilp (GER)
28 October 2015; 20:15	3× (yellow card) 1× (suspension)	Report	3× (yellow card) 4× (suspension)	HUK-Coburg Arena, Coburg; Attendance: 3,530; Referees: Maier, Kilp (GER)

== Quarterfinals ==
The draw was held on 1 November 2015.

16 December 2015; 19:00	SC Magdeburg	29–25	Frisch Auf Göppingen	GETEC Arena, Magdeburg; Attendance: 5,730; Referees: Loppaschweski, Blumel (GER)
16 December 2015; 19:00	Bagersted 5	(15–13)	Kaufmann 4	GETEC Arena, Magdeburg; Attendance: 5,730; Referees: Loppaschweski, Blumel (GER)
16 December 2015; 19:00	3× (yellow card) 4× (suspension) 1× (red card)	Report	4× (yellow card) 2× (suspension)	GETEC Arena, Magdeburg; Attendance: 5,730; Referees: Loppaschweski, Blumel (GER)

16 December 2015; 19:00	THW Kiel	27–34	SG Flensburg-Handewitt	Sparkassen-Arena, Kiel; Attendance: 10,285; Referees: Geipel, Helbig (GER)
16 December 2015; 19:00	Duvnjak 7	(15–18)	Glandorf, Svan Hansen 9	Sparkassen-Arena, Kiel; Attendance: 10,285; Referees: Geipel, Helbig (GER)
16 December 2015; 19:00	3× (yellow card) 3× (suspension)	Report	2× (yellow card) 3× (suspension)	Sparkassen-Arena, Kiel; Attendance: 10,285; Referees: Geipel, Helbig (GER)

16 December 2015; 20:00	Rhein-Neckar Löwen	22–21	MT Melsungen	Friedrich-Ebert-Halle, Ludwigshafen; Attendance: 2,140; Referees: Immel, Klein (GER)
16 December 2015; 20:00	Gensheimer 8	(15–11)	Sellin 4	Friedrich-Ebert-Halle, Ludwigshafen; Attendance: 2,140; Referees: Immel, Klein (GER)
16 December 2015; 20:00	4× (yellow card) 3× (suspension)	Report	4× (yellow card) 6× (suspension) 1× (red card)	Friedrich-Ebert-Halle, Ludwigshafen; Attendance: 2,140; Referees: Immel, Klein (GER)

16 December 2015; 20:15	Bergischer HC	24–23	GWD Minden	Uni-Halle, Wuppertal; Attendance: 1,984; Referees: Brodbeck, Reich (GER)
16 December 2015; 20:15	three players 5	(13–14)	Sjöstrand 7	Uni-Halle, Wuppertal; Attendance: 1,984; Referees: Brodbeck, Reich (GER)
16 December 2015; 20:15	3× (yellow card) 5× (suspension)	Report	2× (yellow card) 4× (suspension)	Uni-Halle, Wuppertal; Attendance: 1,984; Referees: Brodbeck, Reich (GER)

== Final four ==
The final four was held on 30 April and 1 May 2016 at the Barclaycard Arena in Hamburg.

=== Bracket ===
Semifinals
Rhein-Neckar Löwen	30
SG Flensburg-Handewitt (ET)	31
Bergischer HC	33
SC Magdeburg (ET)	36

Final
SG Flensburg-Handewitt	30
SC Magdeburg	32

=== Semifinals ===
30 April 2016
15:00
Rhein-Neckar Löwen
30–31 (ET)
SG Flensburg-Handewitt
Barclaycard Arena, Hamburg
Attendance: 13,200
Referees: Geipel, Helbig (GER)
Gensheimer 11
(12–14)
three players 5
4× (yellow card) 6× (suspension) 2× (red card)
Report
2× (yellow card) 6× (suspension) 1× (red card)

FT: 26–26 ET: 4–5

30 April 2016
17:45
Bergischer HC
33–36 (ET)
SC Magdeburg
Barclaycard Arena, Hamburg
Attendance: 13,200
Referees: Blumel, Loppaschewski (GER)
Nippes 7
(15–14)
Weber 12
1× (yellow card) 6× (suspension)
Report
3× (yellow card) 2× (suspension)

FT: 29–29 ET: 4–7

=== Final ===
1 May 2016; 15:00	SG Flensburg-Handewitt	30–32	SC Magdeburg	Barclaycard Arena, Hamburg; Attendance: 13,200; Referees: Pritschow, Pritschow (GER)
1 May 2016; 15:00	Gottfridsson 7	(12–14)	Weber 10	Barclaycard Arena, Hamburg; Attendance: 13,200; Referees: Pritschow, Pritschow (GER)
1 May 2016; 15:00	3× (yellow card) 3× (suspension)	Report	4× (yellow card) 6× (suspension)	Barclaycard Arena, Hamburg; Attendance: 13,200; Referees: Pritschow, Pritschow (GER)
