= 2019–20 Handball-Bundesliga =

Handball season

Handball-Bundesliga
- Season: 2019–20
- Champions: THW Kiel
- Champions League: THW Kiel; SG Flensburg-Handewitt
- EHF Cup: SC Magdeburg; TSV Hannover-Burgdorf; Rhein-Neckar Löwen
- Matches: 240
- Goals: 13,032 (54.3 per match)
- Top goalscorer: Bjarki Már Elísson (216 goals)
- Attendance: 1,170,750 (4,878 per match)

The 2019–20 Handball-Bundesliga was the 55th season of the Handball-Bundesliga, Germany's premier handball league and the 43rd season consisting of only one league. It ran from 22 August 2019 until it was cancelled in April 2020.

Due to the COVID-19 pandemic the league postponed the league until late April. On 3 April, it was suspended until 16 May.

On 21 April 2020, the season was eventually cancelled. THW Kiel was declared the champion.

== Teams ==
Locations of the 2019–20 Handball-Bundesliga teams

=== Team changes ===
Promoted from 2018–19 2. Handball-Bundesliga	Relegated from 2018–19 Handball-Bundesliga
HBW Balingen-Weilstetten; HSG Nordhorn-Lingen	SG BBM Bietigheim; VfL Gummersbach

=== Stadiums ===
Team	Location	Arena	Capacity
Bergischer HC	Wuppertal; Solingen; Düsseldorf	Uni-Halle; Klingenhalle; ISS Dome	3,200; 2,800; 12,500
Füchse Berlin	Berlin	Max-Schmeling-Halle	9,000
HBW Balingen-Weilstetten	Balingen	Sparkassen-Arena; Porsche-Arena	2,300; 6,181
TVB 1898 Stuttgart	Stuttgart	Scharrena Stuttgart; Porsche-Arena	2,251; 6,211
HC Erlangen	Nuremberg	Arena Nürnberger Versicherung	8,308
SG Flensburg-Handewitt	Flensburg	Flens-Arena	6,300
Die Eulen Ludwigshafen	Ludwigshafen	Friedrich-Ebert-Halle	2,350
Frisch Auf Göppingen	Göppingen	EWS Arena	5,600
TSV Hannover-Burgdorf	Hanover	TUI Arena; Swiss Life Hall	9,850; 4,460
THW Kiel	Kiel	Sparkassen-Arena	10,285
SC DHfK Leipzig	Leipzig	Quarterback Immobilien Arena	6,327
TBV Lemgo	Lemgo	Phoenix Contact Arena	4,790
SC Magdeburg	Magdeburg	GETEC Arena	6,600
MT Melsungen	Kassel	Rothenbach-Halle	4,300
GWD Minden	Minden	Kampa-Halle	4,059
HSG Nordhorn-Lingen	Nordhorn; Lingen (Ems)	Euregium; EmslandArena	4,100; 4,995
Rhein-Neckar Löwen	Mannheim	SAP Arena	13,200
HSG Wetzlar	Wetzlar	Rittal Arena Wetzlar	4,421

== Standings ==
The season was cancelled on 21 April 2020. The final season placings were determined by points per game. There were no relegations to the 2nd division.

Pos	Team	Pld	W	D	L	GF	GA	GD	PPG	Qualification
1	THW Kiel (C)	26	22	0	4	782	650	+132	1.69	Champions League
2	SG Flensburg-Handewitt	27	20	2	5	732	647	+85	1.56	Champions League
3	SC Magdeburg	27	19	1	7	782	717	+65	1.44	EHF Cup
4	TSV Hannover-Burgdorf	27	16	4	7	778	736	+42	1.33	
5	Rhein-Neckar Löwen	26	15	4	7	729	686	+43	1.31	EHF Cup
6	Füchse Berlin	27	17	1	9	775	723	+52	1.30	EHF Cup
7	MT Melsungen	26	15	2	9	716	700	+16	1.23	
8	SC DHfK Leipzig	26	13	1	12	714	714	0	1.04	
9	HSG Wetzlar	27	12	3	12	754	754	0	1.00	
10	TBV Lemgo	27	12	3	12	765	768	−3	1.00	
11	Frisch Auf Göppingen	26	11	1	14	679	684	−5	0.88	
12	TVB 1898 Stuttgart	27	8	5	14	709	759	−50	0.78	
13	Bergischer HC	27	8	4	15	709	728	−19	0.74	
14	HC Erlangen	27	9	2	16	695	739	−44	0.74	
15	GWD Minden	26	7	4	15	690	720	−30	0.69	
16	HBW Balingen-Weilstetten	27	6	4	17	741	818	−77	0.59	
17	Die Eulen Ludwigshafen	27	6	3	18	639	702	−63	0.56	
18	HSG Nordhorn-Lingen	27	2	0	25	643	787	−144	0.15	

Source: Handball-Bundesliga
Rules for classification: 1) Points per game; 2) Goal difference; 3) Goals scored.
(C) Champions

== Results ==
Home \ Away	BAL	BRG	BER	BIT	ERL	FLE	FRI	GÖP	HAN	KIE	LEI	LEM	MAG	MEL	MIN	NOR	RNL	WET
HBW Balingen-Weilstetten	—	29–27	31–30	25–25	30–32		25–25		33–35	20–32	26–24	29–31	32–34	36–23	26–26	25–23		33–34
Bergischer HC		—	26–26		25–24	20–21		25–25	28–27	29–34		35–33	23–24	24–24	26–23	31–18	26–29	30–33
Füchse Berlin	33–27	27–24	—	36–27	30–23	33–35	29–19			29–28	29–28		25–24	28–22	25–29	30–32	23–22	32–27
TVB 1898 Stuttgart	32–26	25–31	32–33	—	30–24	23–23		29–26	23–28	21–29	25–25	26–26	27–29	31–28	24–24	29–24		
HC Erlangen	32–27	28–26	34–29	29–24	—		23–27	23–26		27–31	25–22	26–26	27–32	25–30		26–25	29–29	25–31
SG Flensburg-Handewitt	32–25	29–23	27–23			—	29–26	28–22			30–22		29–23	30–23	27–22	29–27	30–27	31–28
Die Eulen Ludwigshafen		27–27	19–27	23–27	19–23	25–23	—	24–23	24–26		34–27	29–36	17–20	25–25		19–12	23–26	25–31
Frisch Auf Göppingen	26–32	28–22	25–28	31–22		28–26	29–21	—	24–27	26–27		34–27			26–23	28–26		26–21
TSV Hannover-Burgdorf	31–23		31–28	32–19	29–25	23–22	25–23	30–32	—	25–32			31–28		36–30	30–29	29–29	
THW Kiel	36–26			35–23	29–15		30–27	31–24	32–23	—	27–26	31–24		38–26	29–27	31–23	27–21	20–27
SC DHfK Leipzig	27–26	35–32	24–23	31–28	26–21		32–27		30–27		—	34–32	25–26		31–28		28–29	26–29
TBV Lemgo	27–24		26–31	27–23	34–32	18–27	27–19		26–36	27–30	26–27	—	24–32		31–26	31–25	30–25	32–27
SC Magdeburg	38–26		27–29	33–28	24–20	26–25		30–21	30–30	32–31	28–26		—	26–25	31–29	39–27	28–32	34–27
MT Melsungen	36–23	28–25		21–26	28–27	19–24	26–25	30–17	31–25		31–34	26–23	31–29	—			31–26	28–26
GWD Minden	30–30	26–23	30–25		26–29	23–27	29–23	27–26	32–32	26–29	21–25	33–31		27–29	—		24–28	
HSG Nordhorn-Lingen		21–26	24–34			20–29	19–21	20–30	24–32		33–30	24–29	21–27	24–31	25–26	—	17–27	25–31
Rhein-Neckar Löwen	37–26	30–24		33–32		22–24		28–21	30–23	26–25	26–23	29–29		30–33		32–28	—	29–26
HSG Wetzlar		27–24		27–28		27–27	26–23	31–30	25–25	26–30		28–32	29–28	26–31	26–23	34–27	27–27	—

Source: DKB
Legend: Blue = home team win; Yellow = draw; Red = away team win.

== Statistics ==
=== Top goalscorers ===
Rank	Name	Goals	Shots	%
1	(Iceland) Bjarki Már Elísson	217	287	75
2	(Denmark) Hans Lindberg	202	254	80
3	(Denmark) Michael Damgaard	166	316	53
4	(Sweden) Niclas Ekberg	164	201	82
4	(Austria) Robert Weber	164	235	70
6	(Germany) Marcel Schiller	157	223	70
7	(Germany) Timo Kastening	144	200	72
7	(Germany) Patrick Zieker	144	194	74
9	(Germany) Uwe Gensheimer	134	177	76
10	(Netherlands) Jeffrey Boomhouwer	131	179	73

Source: HBL

=== Top goalkeepers ===
Rank	Name	%	Saves	Shots
1	(Serbia) Dejan Milosavljev	36	124	349
2	(Denmark) Niklas Landin Jacobsen	35	220	421
2	(Germany) Finn Zecher	35	8	23
4	(Serbia) Tibor Ivanišević	34	70	232
5	(Germany) Can Adanir	33	1	6
6	(Germany) Finn Hummel	33	1	3
7	(Sweden) Peter Johannesson	33	199	600
8	(Bosnia and Herzegovina) Benjamin Burić	33	166	504
9	(Slovenia) Gorazd Škof	32	121	380
10	(Germany) Mario Ruminsky	31	24	77

Source: HBL
