= 2014–15 Handball-Bundesliga =

Handball-Bundesliga
- Season: 2014–15
- Champions: THW Kiel
- Relegated: GWD Minden; TSG Friesenheim; HC Erlangen; SG BBM Bietigheim
- Champions League: THW Kiel; Rhein-Neckar Löwen; SG Flensburg-Handewitt
- EHF Cup: SC Magdeburg; Frisch Auf Göppingen
- Matches: 342
- Goals: 18,838 (55.08 per match)
- Top goalscorer: (Austria) Robert Weber (271 goals)

The 2014–15 Handball-Bundesliga was the 50th season of the Handball-Bundesliga, Germany's premier handball league and the 38th season consisting of only one league.

== Team information ==
19 teams competed this year.

Location of teams in the Handball-Bundesliga

Team	Location	Arena	Capacity
Frisch Auf Göppingen	Göppingen	EWS Arena	5,600
Füchse Berlin	Berlin	Max-Schmeling-Halle	9,500
SC Magdeburg	Magdeburg	GETEC Arena	7,071
TuS Nettelstedt-Lübbecke	Lübbecke	Merkur Arena	3,250
HSV Hamburg	Hamburg	O2 World Hamburg	13,000
HSG Wetzlar	Wetzlar	Rittal Arena	4,412
HBW Balingen-Weilstetten	Balingen	Sparkassen-Arena	2,340
Rhein-Neckar Löwen	Mannheim	SAP Arena	13,200
SG Flensburg-Handewitt	Flensburg	Flens-Arena	6,300
TBV Lemgo	Lemgo	Lipperlandhalle	5,000
THW Kiel	Kiel	Sparkassen-Arena	10,285
TSV Hannover-Burgdorf	Hannover	Swiss Life Hall	4,460
MT Melsungen	Kassel	Rothenbach-Halle	4,300
TSG Friesenheim	Ludwigshafen	Friedrich-Ebert-Halle	2,500
VfL Gummersbach	Gummersbach	Schwalbe-Arena	4,132
SG BBM Bietigheim	Bietigheim-Bissingen	EgeTrans Arena	4,583
GWD Minden	Minden	Kampa-Halle	4,059
Bergischer HC	Wuppertal; Solingen	Uni-Halle; Klingenhalle	3,200; 2,800
HC Erlangen	Nuremberg	Arena Nürnberger Versicherung	8,130

== Standings ==
Pos	Team	Pld	W	D	L	GF	GA	GD	Pts	Qualification or relegation
1	THW Kiel (C)	36	32	1	3	1095	854	+241	65	Advance to Champions League
2	Rhein-Neckar Löwen	36	31	1	4	1093	876	+217	63	Advance to Champions League
3	SG Flensburg-Handewitt	36	24	6	6	1025	887	+138	54	Advance to Champions League
4	SC Magdeburg	36	23	2	11	1074	994	+80	48	Advance to EHF Cup
5	Frisch Auf Göppingen	36	19	4	13	976	961	+15	42	Advance to EHF Cup
6	MT Melsungen	36	18	4	14	1060	997	+63	40	
7	Füchse Berlin	36	18	4	14	997	1004	−7	40	
8	HSG Wetzlar	36	14	6	16	958	952	+6	34	
9	HSV Hamburg	36	16	2	18	992	1006	−14	34	
10	VfL Gummersbach	36	15	4	17	979	1007	−28	34	
11	HBW Balingen-Weilstetten	36	14	3	19	900	990	−90	31	
12	TuS Nettelstedt-Lübbecke	36	12	5	19	996	1018	−22	29	
13	TSV Hannover-Burgdorf	36	11	7	18	981	1019	−38	29	
14	Bergischer HC	36	12	4	20	982	1064	−82	28	
15	TBV Lemgo	36	11	5	20	1042	1037	+5	27	
16	GWD Minden (R)	36	12	1	23	950	1003	−53	25	Relegated
17	TSG Friesenheim (R)	36	12	1	23	920	1064	−144	25	Relegated
18	HC Erlangen (R)	36	9	5	22	901	1008	−107	23	Relegated
19	SG BBM Bietigheim (R)	36	6	1	29	917	1097	−180	13	Relegated

Source: dkb-handball-bundesliga.de
Rules for classification: 1) points; 2) Goal difference; 3) Goals scored.
(C) Champions; (R) Relegated

== Results ==
Home \ Away	BAL	BRG	BER	BIE	ERL	FLE	FRI	GÖP	GUM	HAM	HAN	KIE	LEM	LÜB	MAG	MEL	MIN	RNL	WET
Balingen		25–24	26–35	25–24	31–22	20–20	33–30	24–30	29–28	22–21	31–27	22–21	33–28	23–23	25–32	28–23	28–25	27–32	22–24
Bergischer HC	22–18		30–25	33–27	32–27	36–31	27–30	28–28	28–26	35–30	31–31	20–32	31–30	28–27	24–25	28–29	32–30	24–23	28–28
Berlin	30–23	32–23		33–32	26–26	29–32	30–24	24–22	30–27	28–25	28–29	27–38	30–27	30–30	32–27	27–24	32–23	20–30	32–24
Bietigheim	25–29	32–25	22–24		24–26	30–38	24–26	29–25	23–21	28–34	24–28	25–37	22–34	24–32	23–30	23–35	27–23	22–32	28–25
Erlangen	28–27	25–25	28–28	24–24		22–22	37–26	24–29	25–24	34–31	32–29	22–36	31–25	25–30	19–28	28–31	19–23	27–25	22–20
Flensburg	32–18	40–27	36–27	31–25	27–17		29–23	34–26	32–26	29–24	32–26	26–22	24–24	25–21	26–30	29–22	27–24	26–29	27–21
Friesenheim	28–27	30–29	26–31	26–20	27–26	23–27		23–29	26–24	30–23	27–24	20–33	25–24	25–40	24–32	29–35	28–24	22–30	23–29
Göppingen	32–28	31–27	29–27	27–17	25–21	26–34	33–25		23–23	26–23	25–22	25–29	28–27	27–19	33–36	26–31	29–28	22–33	23–22
Gummersbach	31–25	31–28	27–26	35–29	24–21	24–32	30–24	27–31		27–27	29–29	26–32	29–28	29–27	28–27	26–32	27–32	27–32	23–21
Hamburg	26–28	21–20	33–25	28–23	34–24	20–24	33–25	30–29	32–31		23–23	19–20	28–32	34–26	33–29	31–30	28–25	25–26	28–31
Hannover	29–23	39–31	26–31	36–29	35–33	25–25	27–19	29–29	26–26	30–36		26–28	31–27	35–28	24–28	22–26	26–20	23–31	28–26
Kiel	37–18	32–17	32–18	40–27	23–22	30–26	29–21	28–21	33–27	29–19	34–25		33–29	24–21	34–22	32–23	24–23	23–23	32–25
Lemgo	21–21	34–26	28–29	37–30	29–23	26–30	32–32	22–26	26–28	45–26	27–23	27–21		27–35	23–30	33–30	38–21	28–39	26–26
Lübbecke	30–33	34–31	26–35	32–24	28–23	26–31	24–26	29–27	29–31	28–34	25–25	24–31	35–35		29–25	28–28	23–26	25–27	27–26
Magdeburg	27–19	38–32	30–26	37–25	31–26	29–26	36–28	32–32	33–28	25–26	34–28	26–32	36–24	26–32		37–33	28–22	27–32	33–30
Melsungen	31–20	40–28	31–24	33–25	37–23	22–22	31–25	27–32	26–27	23–26	29–26	32–41	35–30	32–23	26–28		35–25	28–31	28–28
Minden	31–24	28–30	30–21	35–27	29–25	22–31	33–26	24–26	25–29	36–30	31–22	23–32	23–30	29–27	35–26	25–25		25–37	24–30
RN Löwen	36–25	30–24	34–21	35–25	35–18	23–20	37–21	26–20	29–24	28–26	32–20	28–29	35–34	35–25	24–23	32–26	28–23		27–20
Wetzlar	25–20	25–18	24–24	26–29	28–26	22–22	32–27	29–24	29–30	32–25	29–27	29–32	32–25	22–28	31–31	29–31	27–25	31–27	

Legend: Blue = home team win; Yellow = draw; Red = away team win.
