= Hampus Wanne =

Swedish handball player (born 1993)

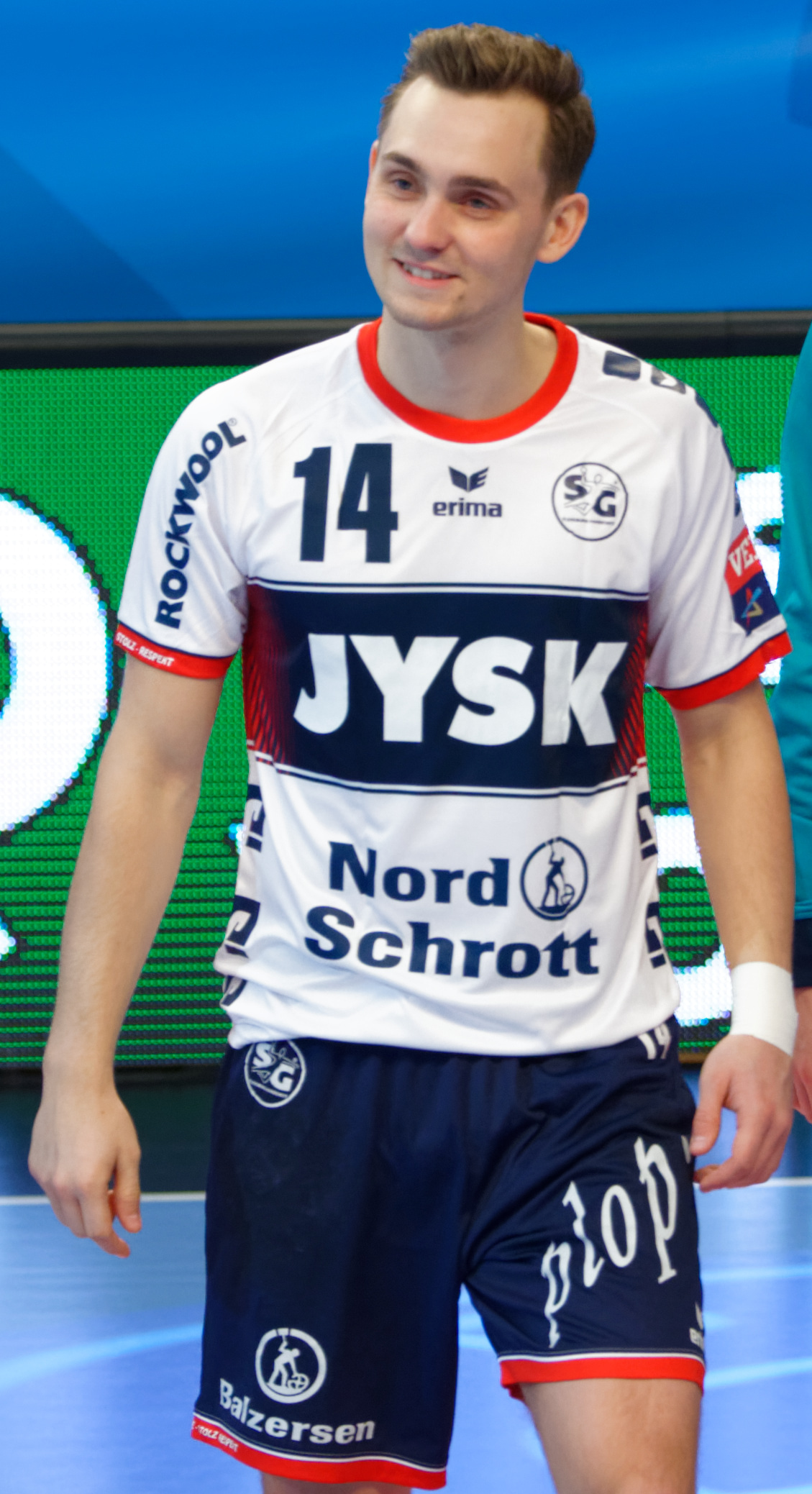

Personal information
- Nationality: Swedish
- Born: 10 December 1993 (age 32) Gothenburg, Sweden
- Height: 1.85 m (6 ft 1 in)

Sport
- Sport: Handball
- Position: Left wing
- Current club: HØJ Elite
- Number: 14

Youth career
- Years: Team
- –2005: Önnereds HK
- 2005–2011: Redbergslids IK

Senior clubs
- Years: Team
- 2011–2013: HK Aranäs
- 2013: Önnereds HK
- 2013–2022: SG Flensburg-Handewitt
- 2022–2025: FC Barcelona
- 2025–: HØJ Elite
National team
Years	Team	Apps	(Gls)
2017–	Sweden	115	(458)
Medal record
World Championship
Silver medal – second place	2021 Egypt
European Championship
Gold medal – first place	2022 Hungary/Slovakia
Silver medal – second place	2018 Croatia
Bronze medal – third place	2024 Germany
- Updated on 14 January 2026

Hampus Wanne (born 10 December 1993) is a Swedish professional handballer for HØJ Elite and the Swedish national team.

== Club career ==
Hampus Wanne started his professional career at Elitserien club HK Aranäs. In January 2013, he moved to the second division team Önnereds HK, the club that he started playing handball as a junior. At the end of the season, regarded as one of the greatest talents on the left wing position, Wanne signed a one-year contract with the Handball-Bundesliga team SG Flensburg-Handewitt for 2013/14 season.

In his first season with the team, SG Flensburg-Handewitt qualified for the EHF Champions League final four in Cologne. In the semi-final game against Barcelona, he scored three goals after coming in as a substitute at 45th minute when Flensburg was down 24–29 and he played a crucial part in Flensburg's impressive 6–0 run in the final seven minutes of the regular time to force the game into an extra-time which also finished with a draw. In the 7-meter shootout, Wanne scored the decisive penalty against Danijel Šarić and sent his team to the Champions League final. Wanne did not take any part in the final match where Flensburg defeated their German rival THW Kiel 30–28 and reached the Champions League trophy for the first time in the club's history. At the end of the season, Wanne extended his contract with Flensburg until the end of 2015/16 season.

In 2015, Wanne became DHB-Pokal champion with his team after he scored once again the winning penalty in the 7-meter shootout against SC Magdeburg.

In summer 2022, Wanne left SG Flensburg-Handewitt for FC Barcelona.

== International career ==
Wanne made his international debut with Sweden men's national handball team against Germany on 18 March 2017. He was a member of the Swedish national team that took silver medal at the 2018 European Handball Championship in Croatia. He won silver medals again at the 2021 World Championship. At this occasion he was named as part of the all-star team.

At the 2020 Olympics he reached the quarterfinal.

At the 2022 European Championship he was a key part of the Swedish team that won gold medals, playing 8 out of 9 games and scoring 45 goals.

Two years later he won bronze medals at the 2024 European Championship, playing all 9 games and scoring 36 goals. This was enough to once again be part of the tournament all-star team.

At the 2024 Olympics he reached the quarterfinal with Sweden.

At the 2025 World Championship he and Sweden finished on a disappointing 14th place.

== Personal life ==
He is engaged to former handballer Daniela Gustin.

== Honours ==
=== Club ===
- EHF Champions League
  - Gold: 2014, 2024
  - Bronze: 2023
- IHF Super Globe
  - Silver: 2022
  - Bronze: 2023
- Handball-Bundesliga
  - Gold: 2018, 2019
  - Silver: 2016, 2017, 2020, 2021
  - Bronze: 2014, 2015
- DHB-Pokal
  - Gold: 2015
  - Silver: 2014, 2016, 2017
- DHB-Supercup
  - Gold: 2019
  - Silver: 2015, 2018, 2020
- Liga ASOBAL
  - Gold: 2023, 2024
- Copa ASOBAL
  - Gold: 2023, 2024
- Copa del Rey
  - Gold: 2023, 2024
- Supercopa Ibérica
  - Gold: 2022, 2023

=== International ===
- EHF European Championship
  - Gold: 2022
  - Silver: 2018
- IHF World Championship
  - Silver: 2021

=== Individual ===
- All-Star left wing of the World Championship: 2021
- All-Star left wing of the European Championship: 2024
- All-Star left wing of the EHF Champions League: 2022
- Swedish Handballer of the Year: 2021
