= Sergey Gorpishin =

Russian handball player

Sergej Gorpishin
Personal information
- Nationality: Russian
- Born: 31 August 1997 (age 29) Erlangen, Germany
- Height: 2.00 m (6 ft 7 in)

Sport
- Sport: Handball
- Position: Pivot
- Current club: Die Eulen Ludwigshafen
- Number: 18

Senior clubs
- Years: Team
- 2016–2017: Springe
- 2017–2018: HC Erlangen
- 2018: DJK Rimpar
- 2018–2019: HC Erlangen
- 2019–2020: RK Vardar
- 2020: Die Eulen Ludwigshafen
- 2021–2022: HBC CSKA Moscow
- 2022–2023: Die Eulen Ludwigshafen
- 2023–: 1. VfL Potsdam
National team
Years	Team	Apps	(Gls)
2018–	Russia	11	(11)

Sergej Gorpishin (born 31 August 1997, in Erlangen) is a Russian handball player who plays for Die Eulen Ludwigshafen and the Russian national team.

He represented Russia at the 2019 World Men's Handball Championship.
