= Tomasz Gębala =

Polish handball player (born 1995)

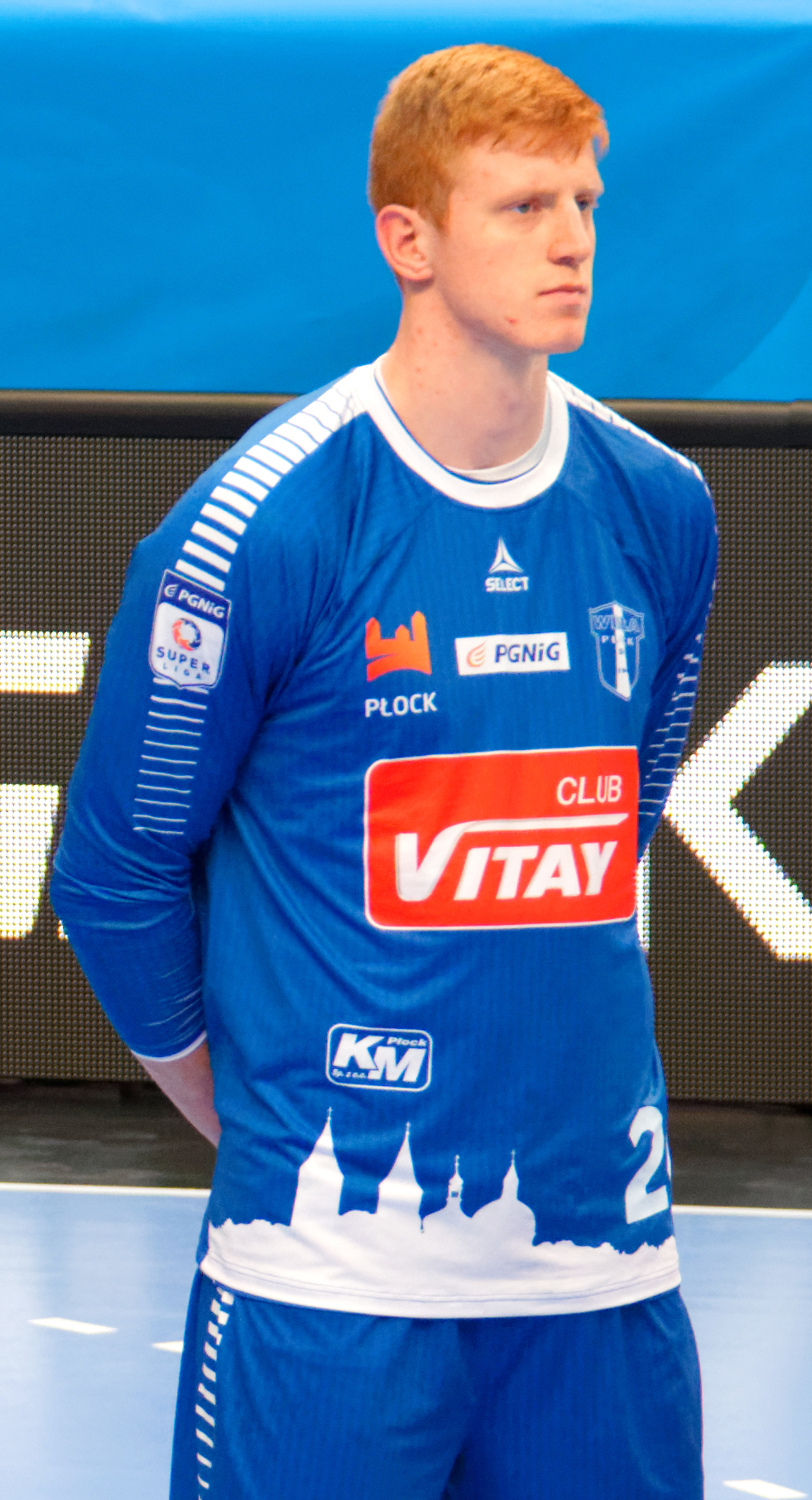

Personal information
- Nationality: Polish
- Born: 23 November 1995 (age 30) Gdynia, Poland
- Height: 2.12 m (6 ft 11 in)

Sport
- Sport: Handball
- Position: Left back
- Current club: Industria Kielce
- Number: 48

Youth career
- Years: Team
- –2011: Arka Gdynia

Senior clubs
- Years: Team
- 2011–2013: SMS Gdańsk
- 2013–2016: SC Magdeburg
- 2016–2019: Wisła Płock
- 2019–2025: Industria Kielce
- 2025-: Wybrzeże Gdańsk
National team
Years	Team	Apps	(Gls)
2016–	Poland	49	(135)

Tomasz Gębala (born 23 November 1995) is a Polish handball player for Industria Kielce.

He participated at the 2017 World Men's Handball Championship.

== Private life ==
His older brother Maciej Gębala is also a handball player.
