= Petter Øverby =

Norwegian handball player (born 1992)

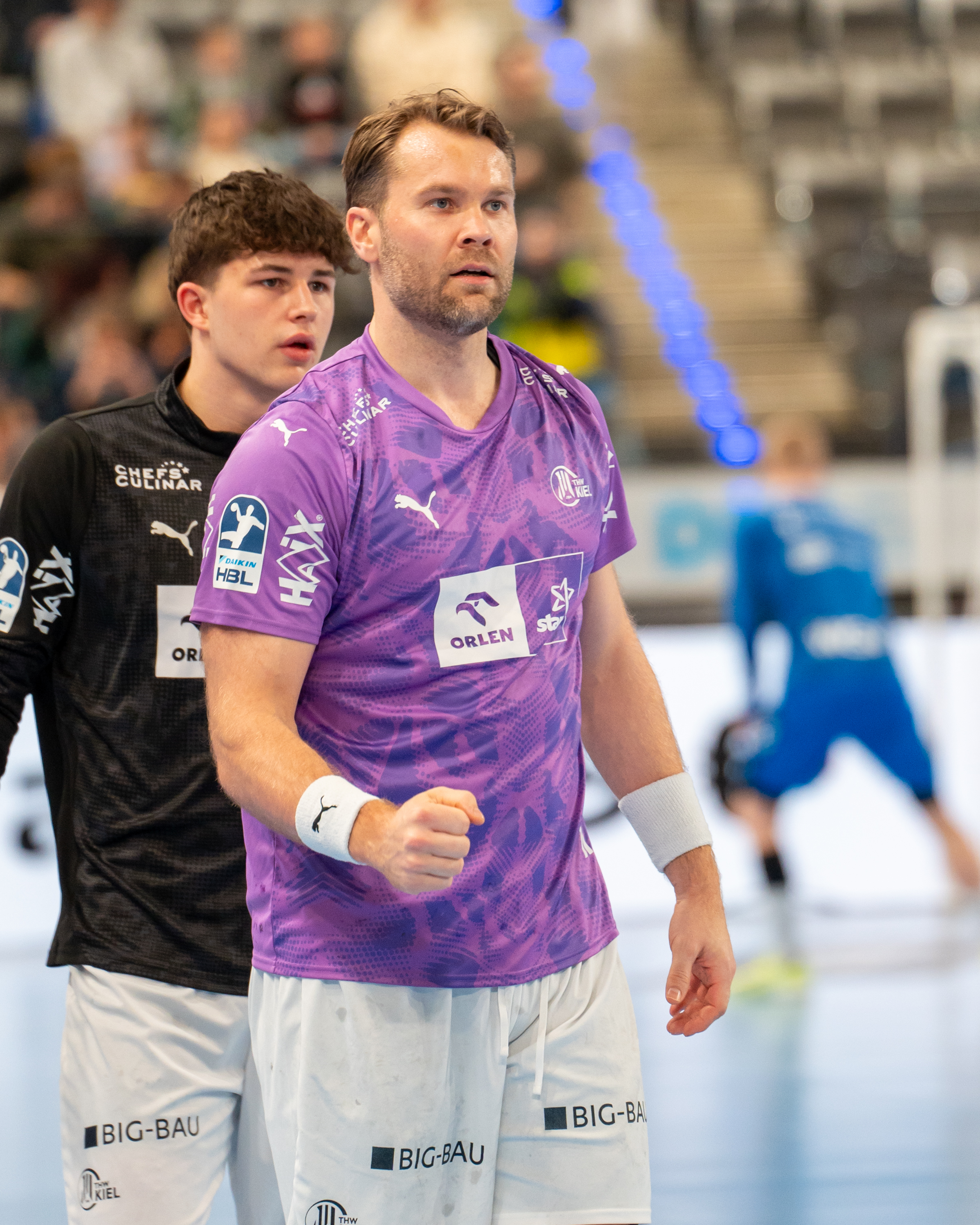
- Øverby in 2026

Personal information
- Nationality: Norwegian
- Born: 26 March 1992 (age 34) Kongsvinger, Norway
- Height: 2.00 m (6 ft 7 in)

Sport
- Sport: Handball
- Position: Pivot
- Current club: THW Kiel
- Number: 11

Senior clubs
- Years: Team
- 2010–2017: Elverum Håndball
- 2017–2018: KIF Kolding
- 2018–2022: HC Erlangen
- 2022–: THW Kiel
National team
Years	Team	Apps	(Gls)
2013–2025	Norway	153	(160)
Medal record
World Championship
Silver medal – second place	2017 France
Silver medal – second place	2019 Germany/Denmark
European Championship
Bronze medal – third place	2020 Sweden/Austria/Norway
- Updated on 1 July 2025

Petter Øverby (born 26 March 1992) is a Norwegian professional handball player for THW Kiel and the Norwegian national team.

He competed at the 2016 European Men's Handball Championship.

== Achievements ==
- Norwegian League:
  - Gold: 2013, 2017
- Handball-Bundesliga:
  - Gold: 2023
- DHB-Pokal
  - Gold: 2025
- DHB-Supercup:
  - Gold: 2022, 2023
