= Klemen Ferlin =

Slovenian handball player (born 1989)

Personal information
- Nationality: Slovenian
- Born: 26 June 1989 (age 37) Ljubljana, SFR Yugoslavia
- Height: 1.92 m (6 ft 4 in)

Sport
- Sport: Handball
- Position: Goalkeeper
- Current club: RD Slovan
- Number: 22

Senior clubs
- Years: Team
- 2006–2014: RK Trimo Trebnje
- 2014–2018: RK Gorenje Velenje
- 2018–2020: RK Celje
- 2020–2024: HC Erlangen
- 2024–2026: KS Iskra Kielce
- 2026–: RD Slovan
National team
Years	Team	Apps	(Gls)
–	Slovenia	89	(4)
- Updated on 24 January 2026

Klemen Ferlin (born 26 June 1989) is a Slovenian handball player who plays for RD Slovan and the Slovenia national team.

Ferlin represented Slovenia at the 2020 European Men's Handball Championship and at the 2024 Summer Olympics.
