= Martin Schwalb =

German handball player (born 1963)

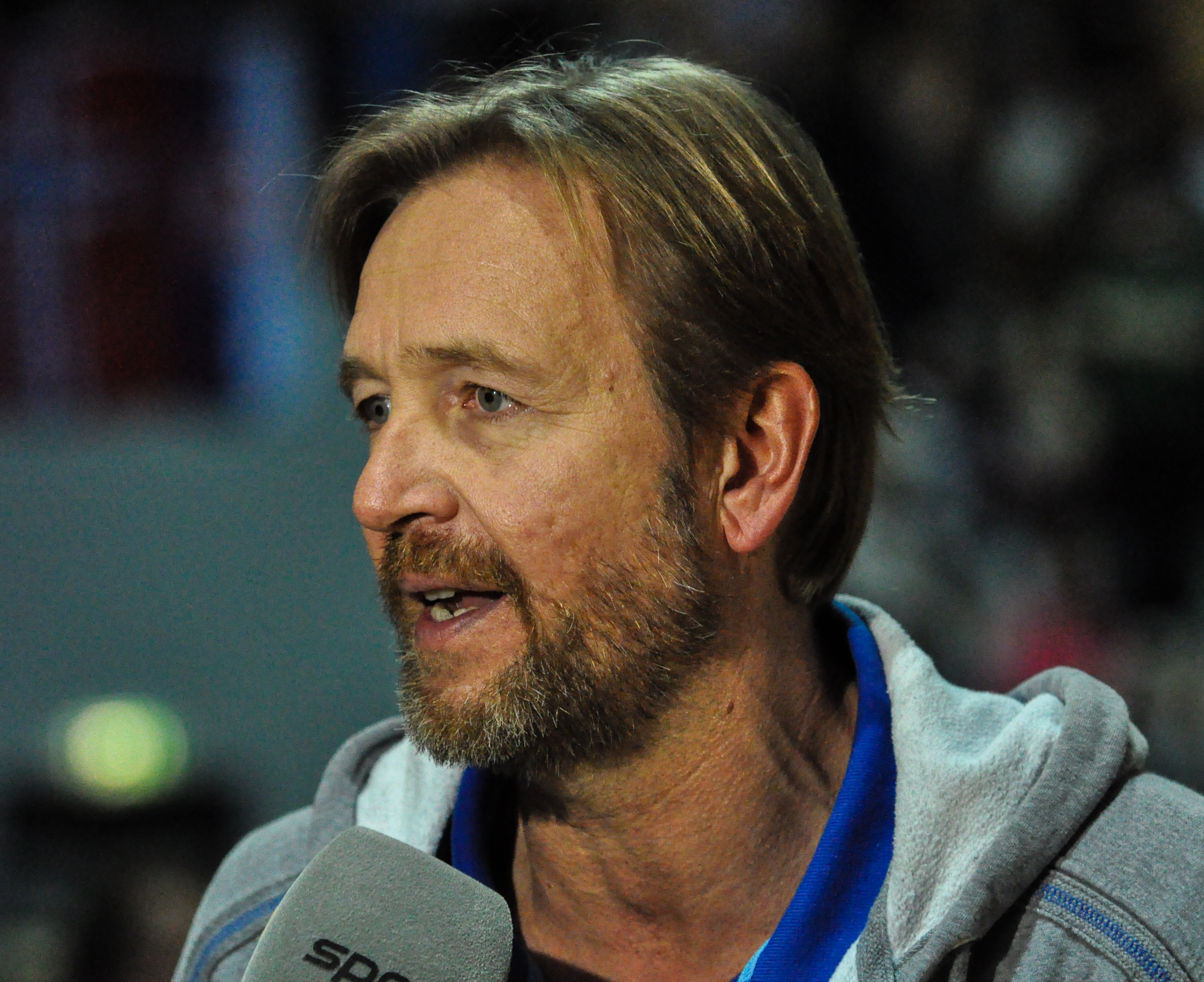
- Schwalb with HSV Hamburg in 2008

Personal information
- Born: 4 May 1963 (age 63) Stuttgart, West Germany
- Height: 1.94 m (6 ft 4 in)

Sport
- Sport: Handball
- Position: Right back

Senior clubs
- Years: Team
- -1980: TSG Steinheim
- 1980-1982: TSG Oßweil
- 1982-1984: Frisch Auf Göppingen
- 1984-1988: TV Großwallstadt
- 1988-1990: TUSEM Essen
- 1990-1998: SG Wallau-Massenheim
- 1999: HC 93 Bad Salzuflen
National team
Years	Team	Apps	(Gls)
1983-?	Germany	193	(594)

Teams managed
- 1998-2005: SG Wallau-Massenheim
- 2005: HSG Wetzlar
- 2005-2011: HSV Hamburg
- 2012-2014: HSV Hamburg
- 2020-2021: Rhein-Neckar Löwen
- 1/2024-2/2025: HC Erlangen
Medal record
Men's handball
Representing West Germany
Olympic Games
Silver medal – second place	1984 Los Angeles	Team

Martin Schwalb (born 4 May 1963) is a former West German handball player and current handball coach who competed in the 1984 Summer Olympics and in the 1996 Summer Olympics.

In 2013 he led his team, HSV Hamburg, to its first win of the EHF Champions League.

In 1984 he was a member of the West German handball team which won the silver medal. He played all six matches and scored nine goals. He and all the other players of the German Handballteam were awarded with the Silver Laurel Leaf, Germany's highrst sportaward.

Twelve years later he was part of the German team which finished seventh. He played all six matches and scored 23 goals.

== Clubs ==
=== As a player ===
- (Germany) TSG Steinheim (–1980)
- (Germany) TSG Oßweil (1980–1982)
- (Germany) Frisch Auf Göppingen (1982–1984)
- (Germany) TV Großwallstadt (1984–1988)
- (Germany) TUSEM Essen (1988–1990)
- (Germany) SG Wallau-Massenheim (1990–1998)

=== As a coach ===
- (Germany) SG Wallau-Massenheim (1998–2005)
- (Germany) HSG Wetzlar (2005)
- (Germany) HSV Hamburg (2005–2011, 2012–2014)
- (Germany) Rhein-Neckar Löwen (2020-2021)
- (Germany) HC Erlangen(2024-2025)
