= Gorazd Škof =

Slovenian handball player

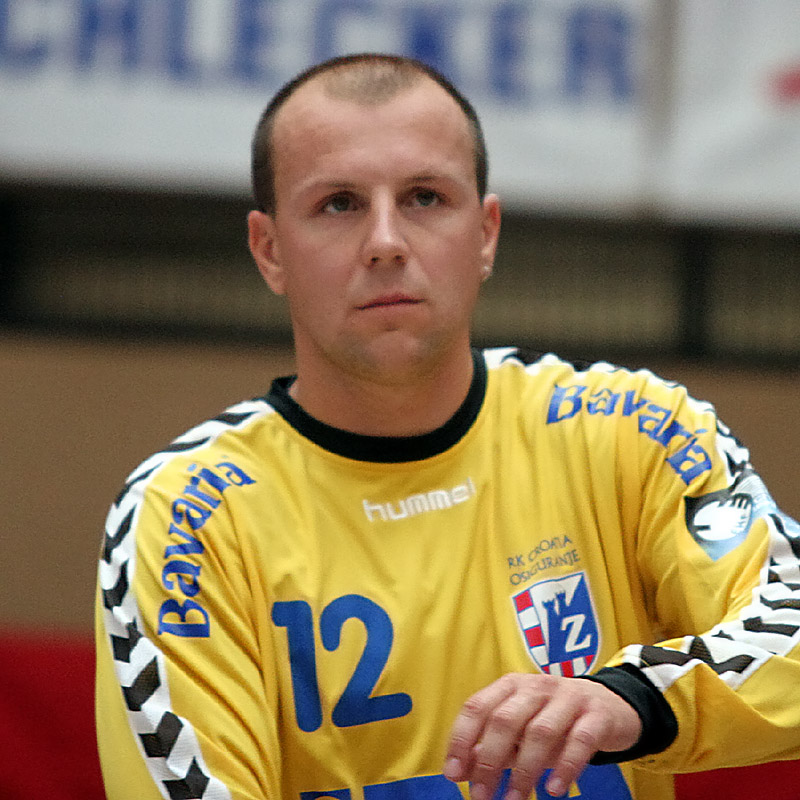
- Škof in 2009

Personal information
- Nationality: Slovenian
- Born: 11 July 1977 (age 49) Novo Mesto, SFR Yugoslavia
- Height: 1.88 m (6 ft 2 in)

Sport
- Sport: Handball
- Position: Goalkeeper

Senior clubs
- Years: Team
- –: RK Brežice
- –: RK Krško
- 1999–2003: RK Trimo Trebnje
- 2003–2004: RK Gorenje Velenje
- 2004–2008: RK Celje
- 2008–2011: RK Zagreb
- 2011–2013: RK Cimos Koper
- 2013: Créteil
- 2013–2016: HBC Nantes
- 2016–2017: Paris SG
- 2017–2019: HC Erlangen
- 2019: SC Ferlach
- 2019–2021: Die Eulen Ludwigshafen
National team
Years	Team	Apps	(Gls)
2001–2016	Slovenia	188	(0)

Teams managed
- 2022–: Slovenia (GK coach)
- 2023: HC Erlangen (GK coach)
- 2023–: HC Kriens-Luzern (GK coach)

Gorazd Škof (born 11 July 1977) is a Slovenian handball coach and retired player. He made a total of 188 appearances for Slovenia and represented the team in several major tournaments, including the 2016 Summer Olympics.

In 2017 he won the French Championship with Paris SG.
