= Maciej Gębala =

Polish handball player (born 1994)

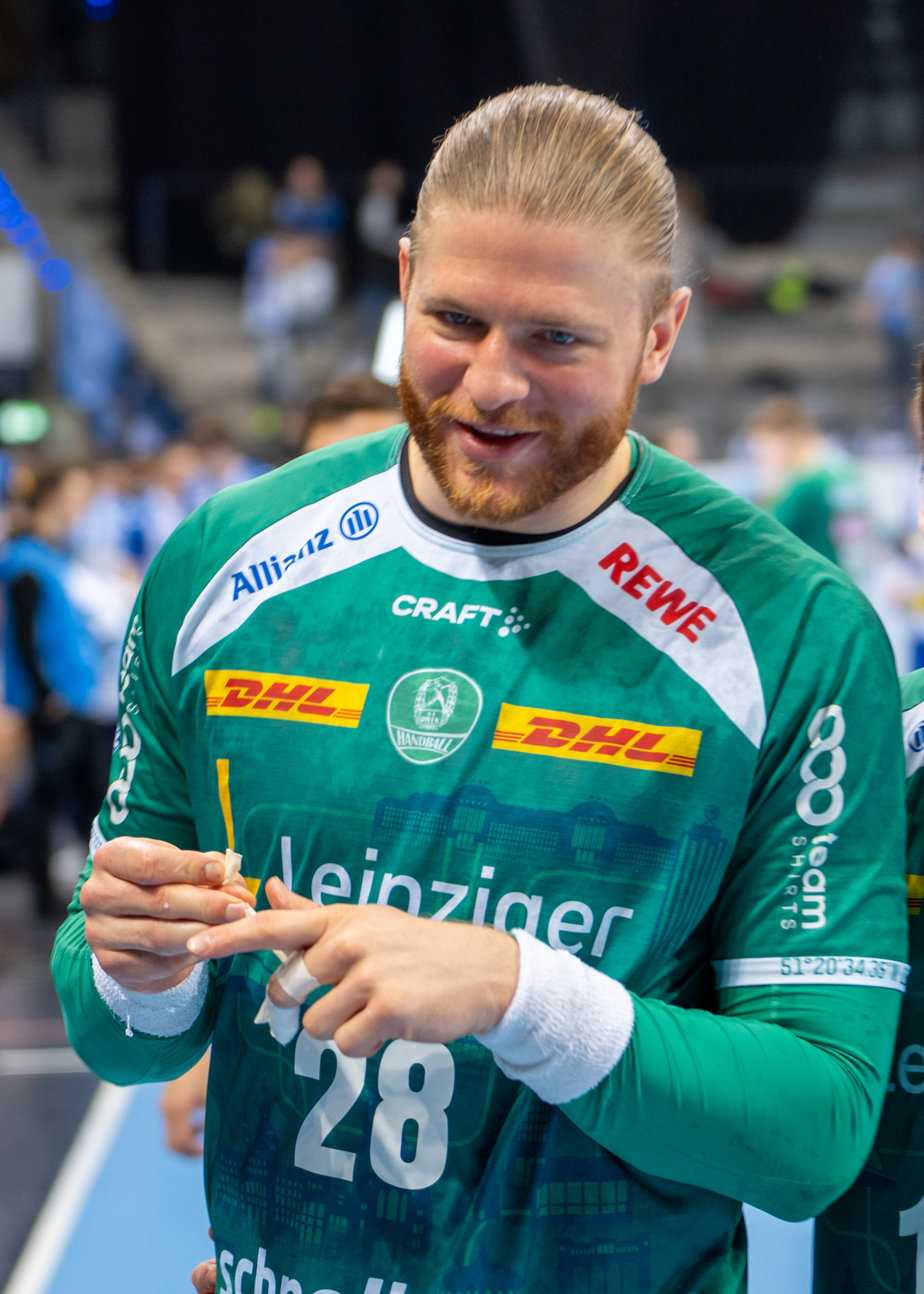

Personal information
- Nationality: Polish
- Born: 10 January 1994 (age 32) Gdynia, Poland
- Height: 2.00 m (6 ft 7 in)

Sport
- Sport: Handball
- Position: Pivot
- Current club: HC Erlangen
- Number: 77

Senior clubs
- Years: Team
- 2011–2012: SMS Gdańsk
- 2012–2013: Arka Gdynia
- 2013–2016: SC Magdeburg
- 2015–2016: → HC Aschersleben (loan)
- 2016–2018: Wisła Płock
- 2018–2024: SC DHfK Leipzig
- 2024–: HC Erlangen
National team
Years	Team	Apps	(Gls)
2015–	Poland	116	(151)
- Updated on 12 January 2026

Maciej Gębala (born 10 January 1994) is a Polish handball player for HC Erlangen in Germany and the Polish national team.

He competed at the 2016 European Men's Handball Championship and at the 2017 World Men's Handball Championship.

== Private life ==
His younger brother Tomasz Gębala is also a handball player.
