= Christoph Steinert =

German handball player (born 1990)

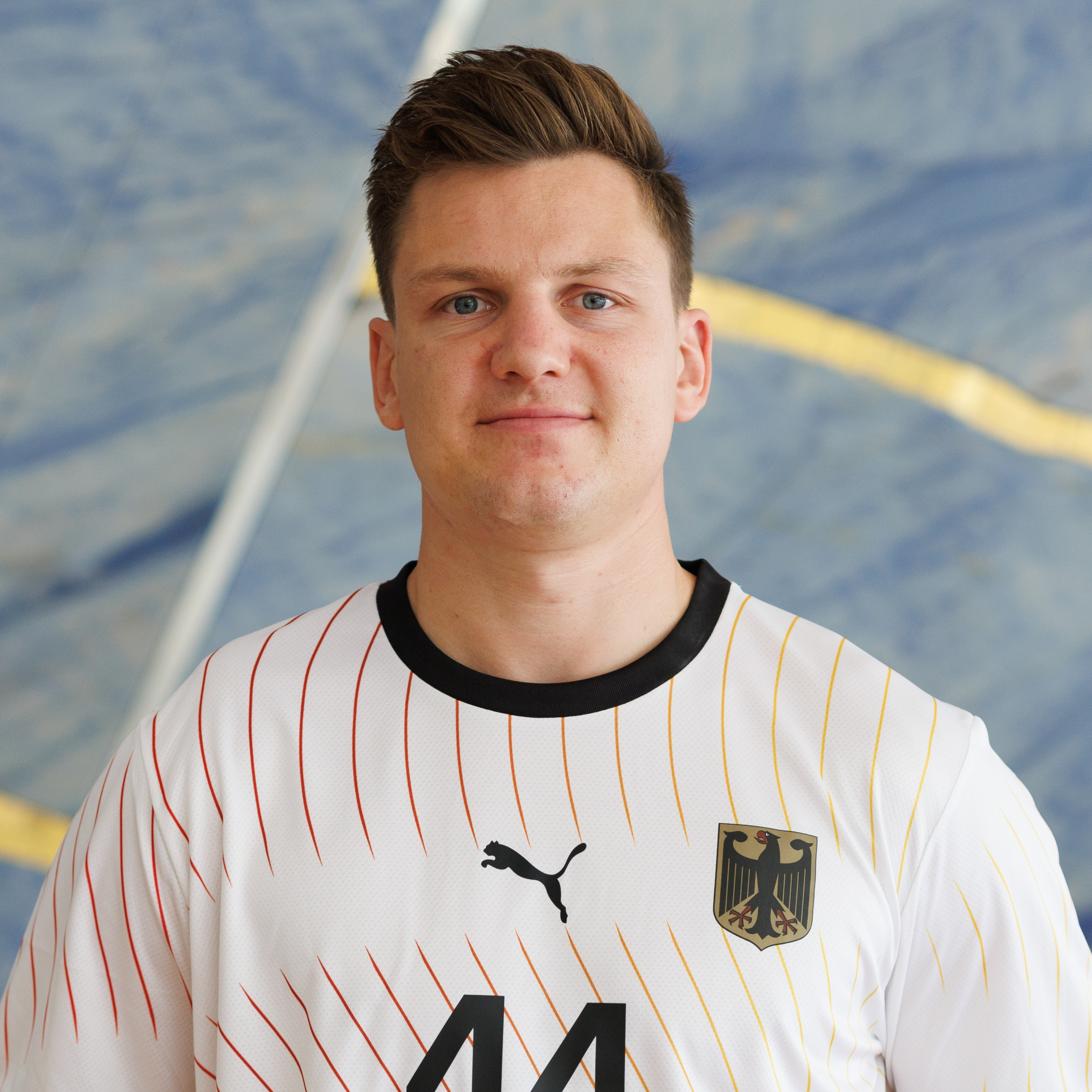
- Steinert in 2024

Personal information
- Full name: Christoph Steinert
- Born: 18 January 1990 (age 36) Berlin, Germany
- Height: 1.95 m (6 ft 5 in)

Sport
- Sport: Handball
- Position: Right back
- Current club: HC Erlangen
- Number: 44

Youth career
- Years: Team
- 2003–2007: SV Lokomotive Rangsdorf
- 2007–2009: SC Magdeburg

Senior clubs
- Years: Team
- 2009–2010: SC Magdeburg
- 2010–2015: GWD Minden
- 2015–2017: SC DHfK Leipzig
- 2017–2019: HC Erlangen
- 2019–2021: SC Magdeburg
- 2021–: HC Erlangen
National team
Years	Team	Apps	(Gls)
2022–	Germany	51	(101)
Medal record
Olympic Games
Silver medal – second place	2024 Paris	Team
- Updated on 7 January 2025

Christoph Steinert (born 18 January 1990) is a German handball player for HC Erlangen and the German national team.

== Career ==
Steinert started playing handball at the age of 13 at SV Lokomotive Rangsdorf.

Steinert won his first major trophy in 2021 with SC Magdeburg, when they defeated Füchse Berlin 28–25 in the final of the EHF European League. He represented Germany at the 2023 World Men's Handball Championship and 2024 European Men's Handball Championship.
