= Johannes Sellin =

German handball player (born 1990)

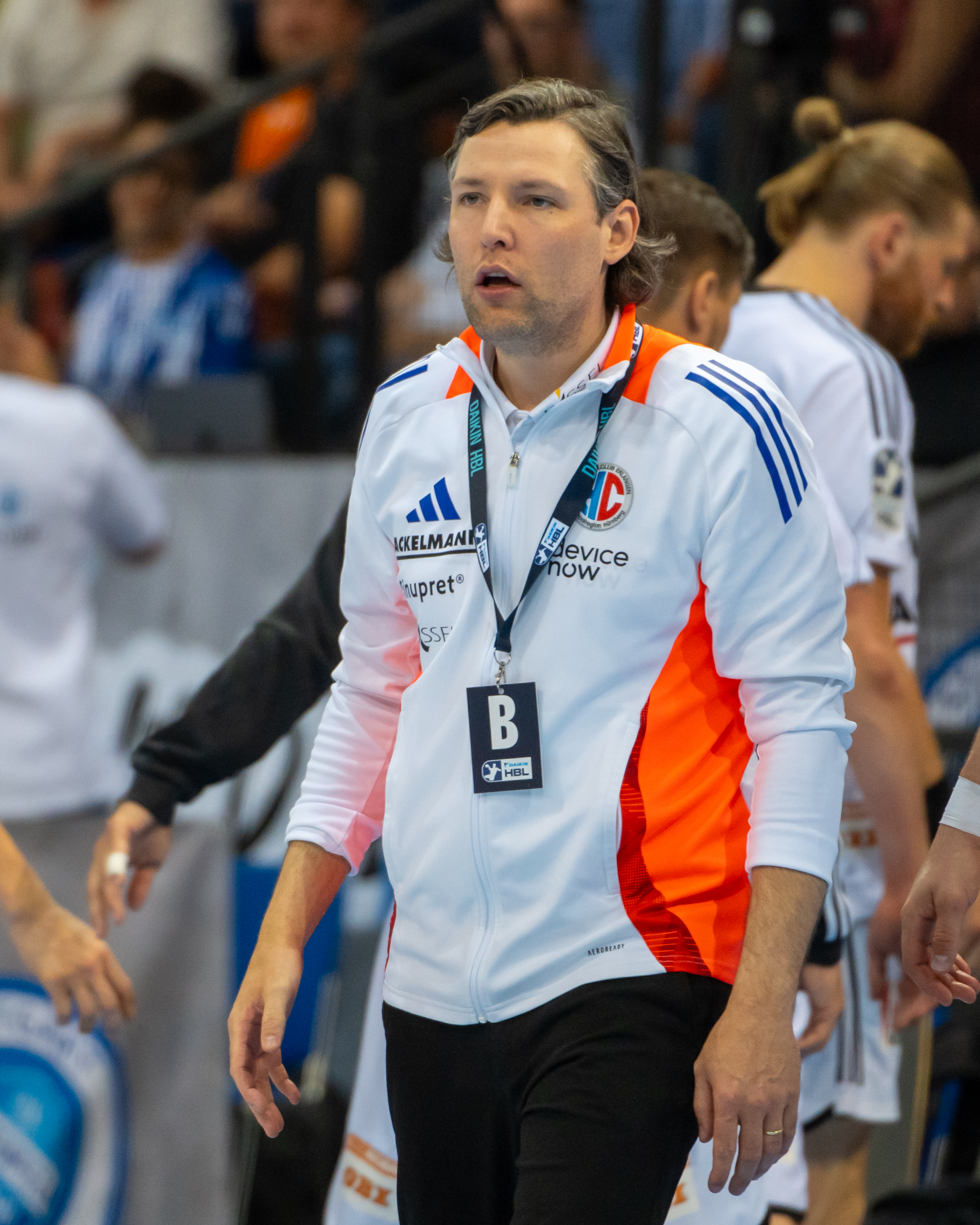
- Sellin in the German national team, 16 September 2014

Personal information
- Nationality: German
- Born: 31 December 1990 (age 35) Wolgast, Germany
- Height: 1.87 m (6 ft 2 in)

Sport
- Sport: Handball
- Position: Right wing
- Current club: HC Erlangen
- Number: 23

Youth career
- Years: Team
- –: HSV Insel Usedom
- 2007-2009: Füchse Berlin

Senior clubs
- Years: Team
- 2008–2013: Füchse Berlin
- 2013–2017: MT Melsungen
- 2017–2023: HC Erlangen
National team
Years	Team	Apps	(Gls)
2012–2023	Germany	54	(108)

Teams managed
- 2023-2024: HC Erlangen 2nd team
- 2024: HC Erlangen Assistant
- 2024-: HC Erlangen
Medal record
European Championship
Gold medal – first place	2016 Poland

Johannes Sellin (born 31 December 1990) is a former German handball player and handball coach. As a player he played the German national team, and was part of the German team that won the 2016 European Men's Handball Championship.

== Playing career ==
Sellin played youth handball at SV Insel Usedom. In 2007 he joined Füchse Berlin, where he started in the second team. From 2009 to 2013 he played for Reinickendorf Füchse Berlin. In 2011 he won the U21 World Championship with the German youth team. The same year he reached the final four of the 2011-12 EHF Champions League. Afterwards he joined MT Melsungen on a two year deal. On 14 March 2012 he debuted for the German national team in a match against Iceland. In 2017 he joined HC Erlangen, where he played for the rest of his career until 2023.

=== Career statistics ===
Season	Team	League	Games	Goals	Penalty goals	Outfield goals
2009/10	Füchse Berlin	Bundesliga	14	26	1	25
2010/11	Füchse Berlin	Bundesliga	26	31	0	31
2011/12	Füchse Berlin	Bundesliga	22	50	0	50
2012/13	Füchse Berlin	Bundesliga	26	100	9	91
2013/14	MT Melsungen	Bundesliga	32	140	39	101
2014/15	MT Melsungen	Bundesliga	35	114	30	83
2015/16	MT Melsungen	Bundesliga	32	159	40	119
2016/17	MT Melsungen	Bundesliga	31	205	67	138
2017/18	HC Erlangen	Bundesliga	18	61	9	52
2018/19	HC Erlangen	Bundesliga	23	77	8	69
2019/20	HC Erlangen	Bundesliga	27	113	32	81
2020/21	HC Erlangen	Bundesliga	32	66	18	48
2021/22	HC Erlangen	Bundesliga	31	85	1	84
2022/23	HC Erlangen	Bundesliga	33	53	0	53
2009–2023	Career Total	Bundesliga	404	1321	254	1067

== Coaching career ==
After his career he was appointed the coach for the second team of HC Erlangen on the third tier of German handball. In 2024 he joined the first team coaching staff as assistant. On October 1st the same year, he replaced Martin Schwalb as the head coach at the club.

== Achievements ==
- European Championship:
  - Gold: 2016
