= Bjarki Már Elísson =

Icelandic handball player (born 1990)

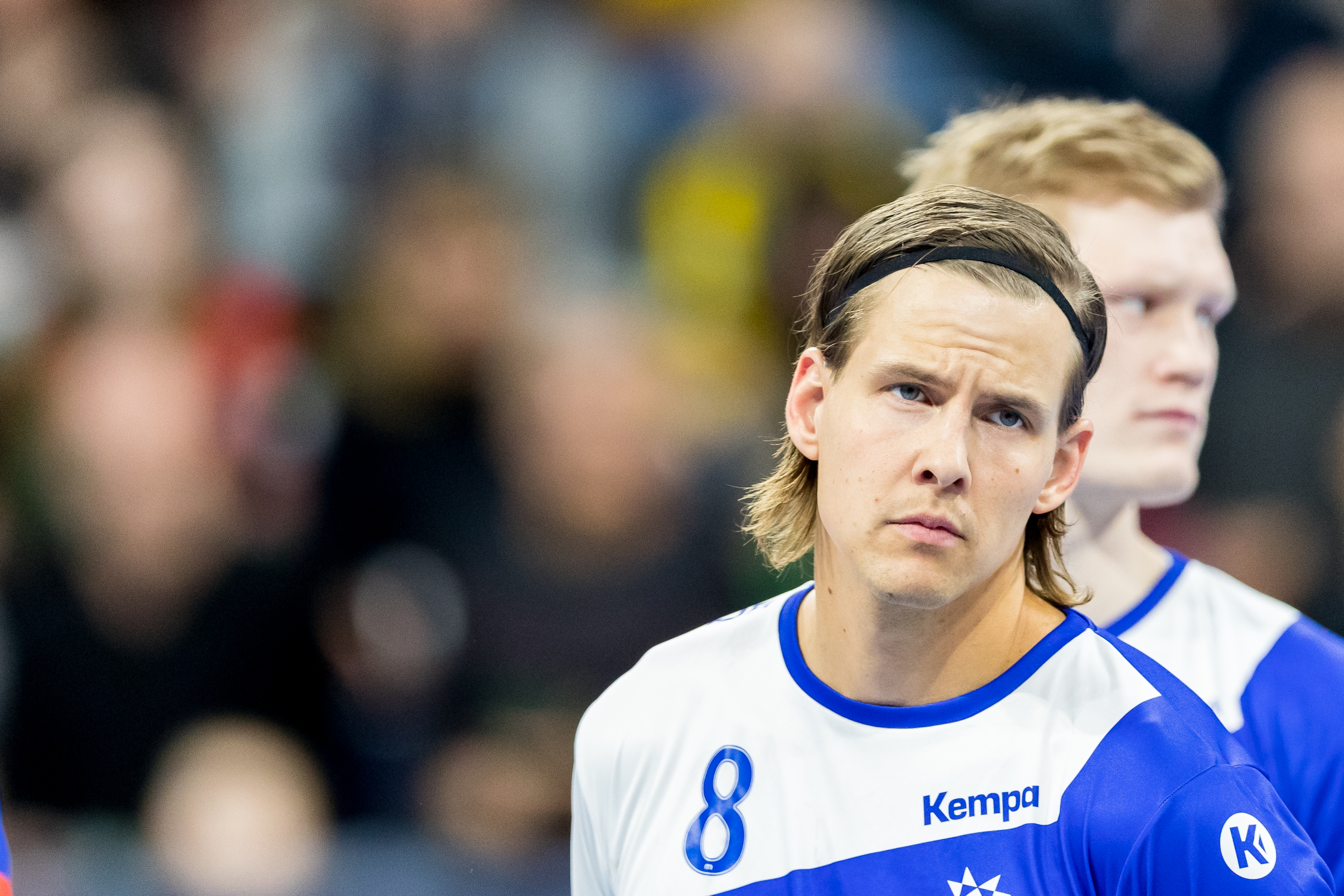

Personal information
- Nationality: Icelandic
- Born: 16 May 1990 (age 36) Reykjavík, Iceland
- Height: 1.91 m (6 ft 3 in)

Sport
- Sport: Handball
- Position: Left wing
- Current club: Paris Saint-Germain
- Number: 4

Youth career
- Years: Team
- –2002: Fylkir
- 2002–2006: Fram
- 2006–2008: Selfoss

Senior clubs
- Years: Team
- 2008–2009: Selfoss
- 2009–2013: HK Kópavogur
- 2013–2015: ThSV Eisenach
- 2015–2019: Füchse Berlin
- 2019–2022: TBV Lemgo Lippe
- 2022–2026: ONE Veszprém
- 2026–: Paris Saint-Germain
National team
Years	Team	Apps	(Gls)
2012–	Iceland	141	(465)

Bjarki Már Elísson (born 16 May 1990) is an Icelandic handball player for Paris Saint-Germain and the Icelandic national handball team.

He participated at the 2017 World Men's Handball Championship. At the 2026 European Men's Handball Championship he finished 4th with Iceland, losing to Denmark in the semifinal and Croatia in the third-place playoff.
