= TSG Friesenheim =

German handball club

Die Eulen Ludwigshafen
- Full name: TSG Ludwigshafen-Friesenheim Bundesliga Handball GmbH
- Nickname: Die Eulen
- Founded: 1881; 145 years ago
- Arena: Friedrich-Ebert-Halle
- Capacity: 2,500
- Head coach: Michael Haaß
- League: 2. Handball-Bundesliga
- 2024-25: 13th
- Club colours
Home	Away

TSG Friesenheim is a handball club from Ludwigshafen, Germany that as in the 2. Handball-Bundesliga since their relegation in the 2020–21 season.

The club was established in 1881 under the name Turnverein Friesenheim

== Accomplishments ==
- 2. Handball-Bundesliga: 2
  - Gold: 2010, 2014

== Crest, colours, supporters ==
=== Kits ===
HOME
2011-13	2013-16	2017–19	2019–20	2020-21

AWAY
2014-15	2015-16	2017–19

== Team ==
=== Current squad ===
Squad for the 2019–20 season

Goalkeeper

- 12 (North Macedonia) Martin Tomovski
- 16 (Slovenia) Gorazd Škof
- 72 (Germany) Stefan Hanemann

Wingers
LW

- 11 (Germany) Jonathan Scholz
- 19 (Germany) Jan Remmlinger
- 21 (Germany) Malte Voigt
- 22 (Germany) Jannik Hofmann

RW

- 20 (Germany) Alexander Falk
- 23 (Germany) Pascal Durak

Line players

- 2 (Germany) Frederic Stüber
- 14 (Germany) Maximilian Haider
- 43 (Germany) Kai Dippe

Back players
LB

- 8 (Germany) Gunnar Dietrich
- 10 (Germany) Daniel Hideg
- 55 (Russia) Azat Valiullin

CB

- 24 (Germany) Pascal Bührer
- 25 (Germany) Dominik Mappes

RB

- 27 (Germany) Jerome Müller
- 35 (Germany) Yessine Meddeb
- 37 (Germany) Max Neuhaus
- 77 (Germany) Jannek Klein

=== Staff ===
- Head coach: Ben Matschke
- Assistant coach: Frank Eckhardt
- Assistant coach: Frank Müller

=== Transfers ===
Transfers for the 2026–27 season

Joining

- (Poland) Paweł Krawczyk (GK) from (Germany) MT Melsungen
- (Germany) Monty Kleinsteuber (LW) from (Germany) SC Magdeburg
- (Germany) Phileas Daniel (CB) from (Germany) SC Magdeburg
- (Germany) Janis Boieck (GK) from (Germany) HC Oppenweiler/Backnang
- (Germany) Sebastian Bösing (LP) from (Germany) TSG Haßloch
- (Germany) Bruno Eickhoff (LP) on loan from (Germany) MT Melsungen

Leaving

- (Slovenia) Žiga Urbič (GK) to (Germany) TV Großwallstadt
- (Germany) Mats Grupe (GK) to (Germany) ThSV Eisenach
- (Germany) Tim Schaller (LW) to (Germany) TV Homburg
- (Germany) Leon Hein (LP) to (Germany) Eintracht Hildesheim
- (Germany) Frederic Stüber (LP)

=== Transfer History ===
Transfers for the 2025–26 season

Joining

- (Germany) Lars Röller (LP) from (Germany) TV Großwallstadt
- (Germany) René Zobel (RB) from (Germany) TV Emsdetten
- (Germany) Matteo Menges (CB) from (Germany) HSC 2000 Coburg

Leaving

- (Switzerland) (Tunisia) Sadok Ben Romdhane (RB) to (Switzerland) TV Möhlin
- (Germany) Mex Raguse (LB) to (Germany) HBW Balingen-Weilstetten
- (Germany) Sebastian Trost (LB) to (Germany) TV Großwallstadt
- (Germany) Magnus Grupe (CB) loan back to (Germany) Rhein-Neckar Löwen
- (Germany) Friedrich Schmitt (LB) on loan at (Germany) MT Melsungen
