= Friedrich-Ebert-Halle =

Multi-purpose hall in Ludwigshafen, Germany

Coordinates: 49.4914°N 8.4129°E

- Eberthalle
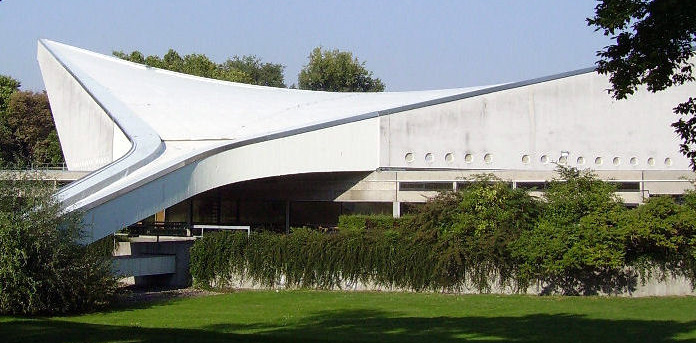
- Friedrich-Ebert-Halle
- Interactive map of Friedrich-Ebert-Halle
- Address: Erzbergerstraße 89; 67063 Ludwigshafen; Germany
- Capacity: 2250
- Type: Indoor arena

Construction
- Opened: 12 March 1965
- Architect: Roland Rainer

Website
- ludwigshafen-eberthalle.de

Friedrich-Ebert-Halle (also known as Eberthalle) is an indoor arena located in Ludwigshafen, Germany, which can accommodate 2,250 guests. The facility was designed by Roland Rainer and completed in 1965. It is used for sporting events, fairs, exhibitions and concerts. Past performers include The Kinks, The Who, Dio, Rainbow and Whitesnake.
