= HC Erlangen =

German handball club

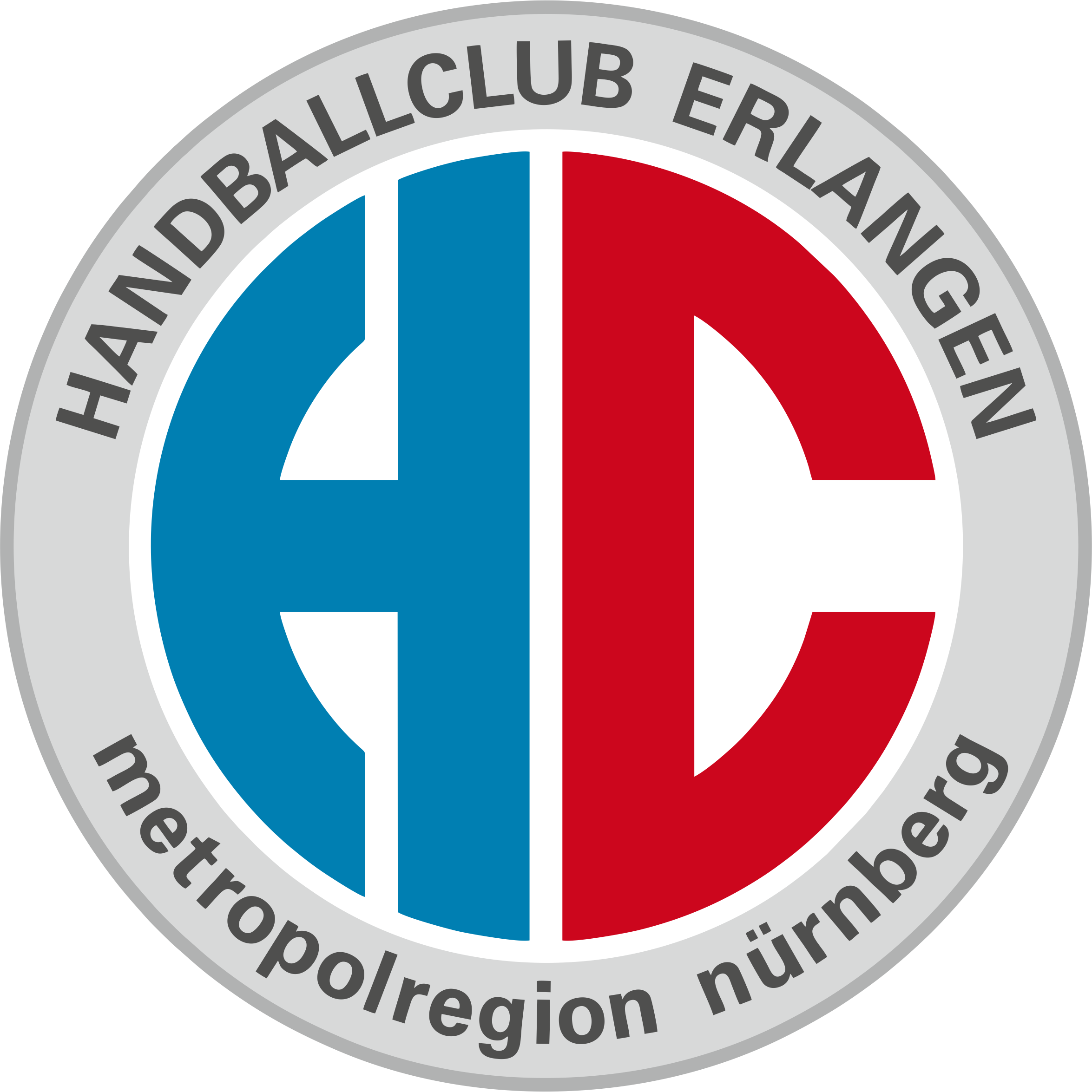
- Full name: Handballclub Erlangen e. V.
- Short name: HCE
- Founded: 2001; 25 years ago
- Arena: PSD Bank Nürnberg Arena
- Capacity: 8,308
- Head coach: Johannes Sellin
- League: Handball-Bundesliga
- 2025–26: 15th of 18
- Club colours
Home	Away

HC Erlangen is a handball club from Erlangen, Germany. They currently compete in the Handball-Bundesliga.

Location of HC Erlangen

== History ==
HC Erlangen was made as a merger between HG Erlangen and CSG Erlangen. In the 2000/2001 season, both HG Erlangen and CSG Erlangen played in the 2. Handball-Bundesliga, but CSG Erlangen had to drop out due to a licensing problem, so the club decided to merge with its neighbor, HG Erlangen. The new club was formed and was named HC Erlangen.

They reached the DHB-Pokal FINAL4 in 2022, but lost their semi-final match against SC Magdeburg 30—22.

== Accomplishments ==
- 2. Handball-Bundesliga:
  - Gold: 2016

== Crest, colours, supporters ==
=== Kit manufacturers ===
Period	Kit manufacturer
–2015	(Germany) Adidas
2015–2018	(Denmark) Hummel
2018–2021	(Germany) Kempa
2021–present	(Germany) Adidas

=== Kits ===
HOME
2010–11	2011–12	2015–16	2017–18	2019–20	2020–21	2021–22

AWAY
2011–12	2016–17	2018–19	2019–20	2021–22

THIRD

2019–20

== Sports hall information ==
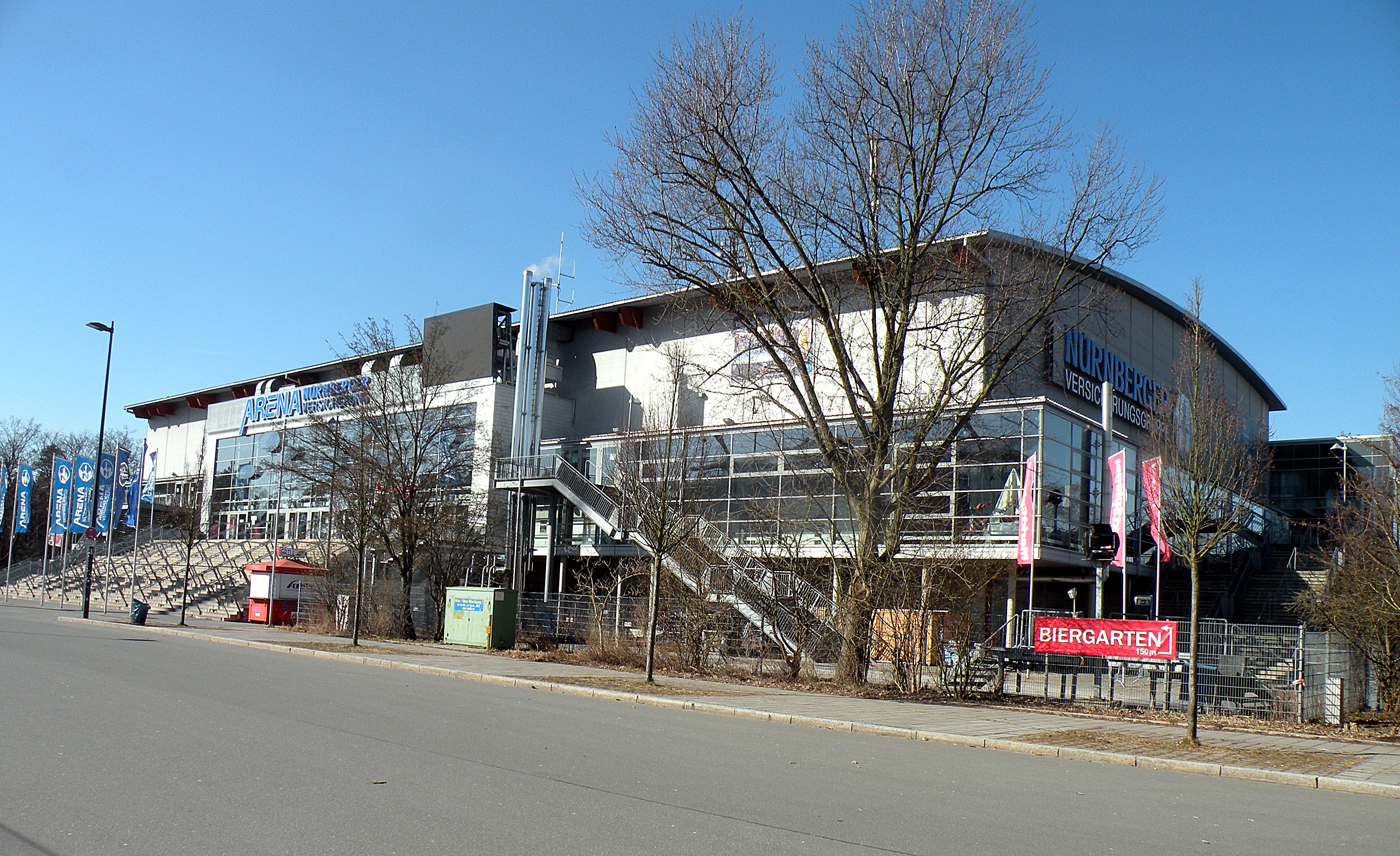
Home hall: PSD Bank Nürnberg Arena

- Name: – PSD Bank Nürnberg Arena
- City: – Nuremberg
- Capacity: – 8308
- Address: – Kurt-Leucht-Weg 11, 90471 Nürnberg, Germany

== Team ==
=== Current squad ===
Squad for the 2024–25 season

HC Erlangen

Goalkeepers

- (Algeria) Khalifa Ghedbane
- (Croatia) Tin Herceg

Left wingers

- 7 (Germany) Yannik Bialowas
- 21 (Germany) Christopher Bissel

Right wingers

- 67 (Sweden) Hampus Olsson

Line players

- 18 (Germany) Sebastian Firnhaber
- 99 (Germany) Stefan Bauer
- (Poland) Maciej Gębala
- (Austria) Tobias Wagner

Left backs

- 28 (Sweden) Jonathan Svensson
- 33 (Germany) Nikolai Link
- (Germany) Marek Nissen
- (Serbia) Miloš Kos

Centre Backs

- 20 (Germany) Niko Büdel
- (Norway) Sander Øverjordet

Right backs

- 4 (Germany) Stephan Seitz
- 27 (Germany) Antonio Metzner
- 44 (Germany) Christoph Steinert

=== Technical staff ===
- Head Coach: (Germany) Johannes Sellin
- Assistant Coach: (Iceland) Ólafur Stefánsson

=== Transfers ===
Transfers for the 2027–28 season

Joining

Leaving

- (Iceland) Viggó Kristjánsson (RB) to (Germany) SG Flensburg-Handewitt

=== Transfer History ===
Transfers for the 2026–27 season

Joining

- (Guinea) (France) Rubens Pierre (GK) from (France) Tremblay Handball
- (Germany) Eloy Morante Maldonado (CB) from (Germany) Bergischer HC
- (Germany) Frieder Bandlow (RB) from (Germany) HSG Nordhorn-Lingen

Leaving

- (Serbia) Miloš Kos (LB) to (Serbia) RK Partizan
- (Sweden) Hampus Olsson (RW) to (Sweden) Lugi HF
- (Germany) Antonio Metzner (RB) to (Germany) GWD Minden
- (Germany) David Sehnke (CB) to (Germany) TV Hüttenberg
- (Germany) Lars Genz (LB) on loan at (Germany) VfL Eintracht Hagen

Transfers for the 2025–26 season

Joining

- (Iceland) Andri Már Rúnarsson (CB) from (Germany) SC DHfK Leipzig

Leaving

- (Austria) Tobias Wagner (LP) to (France) Limoges Handball

Transfers for the 2024–25 season

Joining

- (Algeria) Khalifa Ghedbane (GK) from (North Macedonia) RK Eurofarm Pelister
- (Switzerland) Manuel Zehnder (LB) return from loan at (Germany) ThSV Eisenach
- (Germany) Marek Nissen (LB) from (Germany) TuS N-Lübbecke
- (Norway) Sander Øverjordet (CB) from (Denmark) KIF Kolding
- (Poland) Maciej Gębala (LP) from (Germany) SC DHfK Leipzig
- (Austria) Tobias Wagner (LP) from (Austria) Bregenz Handball
- (Germany) Dario Quenstedt (GK) from (Germany) TSV Hannover-Burgdorf
- (Serbia) Miloš Kos (LB) from (Croatia) RK Zagreb
- (Iceland) Viggó Kristjánsson (RB) from (Germany) SC DHfK Leipzig

Leaving

- (Denmark) Bertram Obling (GK) to (Germany) VfL Gummersbach
- (Sweden) Simon Jeppsson (LB) to (Norway) Kolstad Håndball
- (Germany) Lutz Heiny (LB) to (Germany) TuS N-Lübbecke
- (Switzerland) Manuel Zehnder (CB) to (Germany) SC Magdeburg
- (Germany) Veit Mävers (CB)
- (Denmark) Mads Peter Lønborg (RW) to (Denmark) Aarhus HC
- (Germany) Tim Zechel (LP) to (Germany) SC Magdeburg

== Previous squads ==
2018–2019 Team
Shirt No	Nationality	Player	Birth Date	Position
3	Germany	Nicolai Theilinger	9 February 1992 (age 34)	Right Back
5	Germany	Johannes Sellin	31 December 1990 (age 35)	Right Winger
9	Norway	Petter Øverby	26 March 1992 (age 34)	Line Player
12	Slovenia	Gorazd Škof	11 July 1977 (age 49)	Goalkeeper
13	Germany	Michael Haaß	12 December 1983 (age 42)	Central Back
15	Russia	Sergey Gorpishin	31 August 1997 (age 29)	Line Player
17	Germany	Benedikt Kellner	28 August 1998 (age 28)	Central Back
20	Germany	Nico Büdel	8 December 1989 (age 36)	Central Back
21	Germany	Christopher Bissel	3 September 1995 (age 31)	Left Winger
22	Germany	Dominik Mappes	25 December 1994 (age 31)	Central Back
24	Germany	Martin Murawski	14 September 1994 (age 32)	Left Winger
25	Germany	Jan Schäffer	3 May 1990 (age 36)	Line Player
26	Germany	Michael Haßferter	6 October 1995 (age 31)	Goalkeeper
29	Germany	Nikolas Katsigiannis	17 September 1982 (age 44)	Goalkeeper
33	Germany	Nikolai Link	2 April 1990 (age 36)	Left Back
36	Germany	Florian von Gruchalla	13 June 1989 (age 37)	Right Winger
44	Germany	Christoph Steinert	18 January 1990 (age 36)	Central Back
46	Germany	Jonas Thümmler	21 August 1993 (age 33)	Line Player
71	Germany	Andreas Schröder	26 August 1991 (age 35)	Left Back

== EHF ranking ==
As of 22 October 2026

Rank	Team	Points
220	(Czech Republic) Talent MAT Plzeň	7
221	(Slovenia) RD Ribnica	7
222	(Turkey) Köycegiz BLD SK	7
223	(Germany) HC Erlangen	6
224	(Poland) MMTS Kwidzyn	6
225	(Belarus) SKA Minsk	6
226	(Estonia) HC Tallinn	6

== Former club members ==
=== Notable former players ===
- (Germany) Nico Büdel (2017–)
- (Germany) Steffen Fäth (2020–)
- (Germany) Sebastian Firnhaber (2019–)
- (Germany) Michael Haaß (2016–2020)
- (Germany) Nikolas Katsigiannis (2014–2015, 2016–2020)
- (Germany) Carsten Lichtlein (2019–2020)
- (Germany) Nikolai Link (2012–)
- (Germany) Antonio Metzner (2019–)
- (Germany) Sebastian Preiß (1997–2001, 2013–2016)
- (Germany) Ole Rahmel (2013–2017)
- (Germany) Johannes Sellin (2017–)
- (Germany) Christoph Steinert (2017–2019, 2021–)
- (Germany) Nicolai Theilinger (2015–2019)
- (Germany) Steffen Weinhold (2003–2007)
- (Germany) Martin Ziemer (2020–)
- (Argentina) Ariel Panzer (2004)
- (Austria) David Szlezak (1999–2001)
- (Croatia) Šime Ivić (2019–2021)
- (Croatia) Stanko Sabljić (2014–2015)
- (Czech Republic) Pavel Horák (2015–2017)
- (Czech Republic) Jan Štochl (2013–2016)
- (Denmark) Kim Sonne-Hansen (2022–)
- (Georgia (country)) Sergo Datukashvili (1998–1999)
- (Iceland) Sigurbergur Sveinsson (2014–2015)
- (Netherlands) Iso Sluijters (2011)
- (Norway) Petter Øverby (2018–2022)
- (Russia) Sergey Gorpishin (2017–2019)
- (Russia) Igor Lyovshin (2016–2017)
- (Slovenia) Uroš Bundalo (2016–2017)
- (Slovenia) Klemen Ferlin (2020–)
- (Slovenia) Patrik Leban (2021–)
- (Slovenia) Gorazd Škof (2017–2019)
- (Spain) Isaías Guardiola (2016–2018)
- (Slovakia) Martin Straňovský (2014–2018)
- (Slovakia) Csaba Szücs (2002–2008)
- (Sweden) Marcus Enström (2017–2018)
- (Sweden) Simon Jeppsson (2020–)
- (Sweden) Hampus Olsson (2020–)
- (Sweden) Tobias Rivesjö (2015–2016)
- (Ukraine) Oleksandr Hladun (2001–2002)

=== Former coaches ===
Seasons	Coach
2007–2015	Frank Bergemann
2015–2017	Robert Andersson
2017–2020	Aðalsteinn Eyjólfsson
2020	Rolf Brack
2020–2022	Michael Haaß
2022–2024	Raúl Alonso
2024–2025	Martin Schwalb
2025–	Johannes Sellin
