= 2026 European Men's Handball Championship final =

International handball match

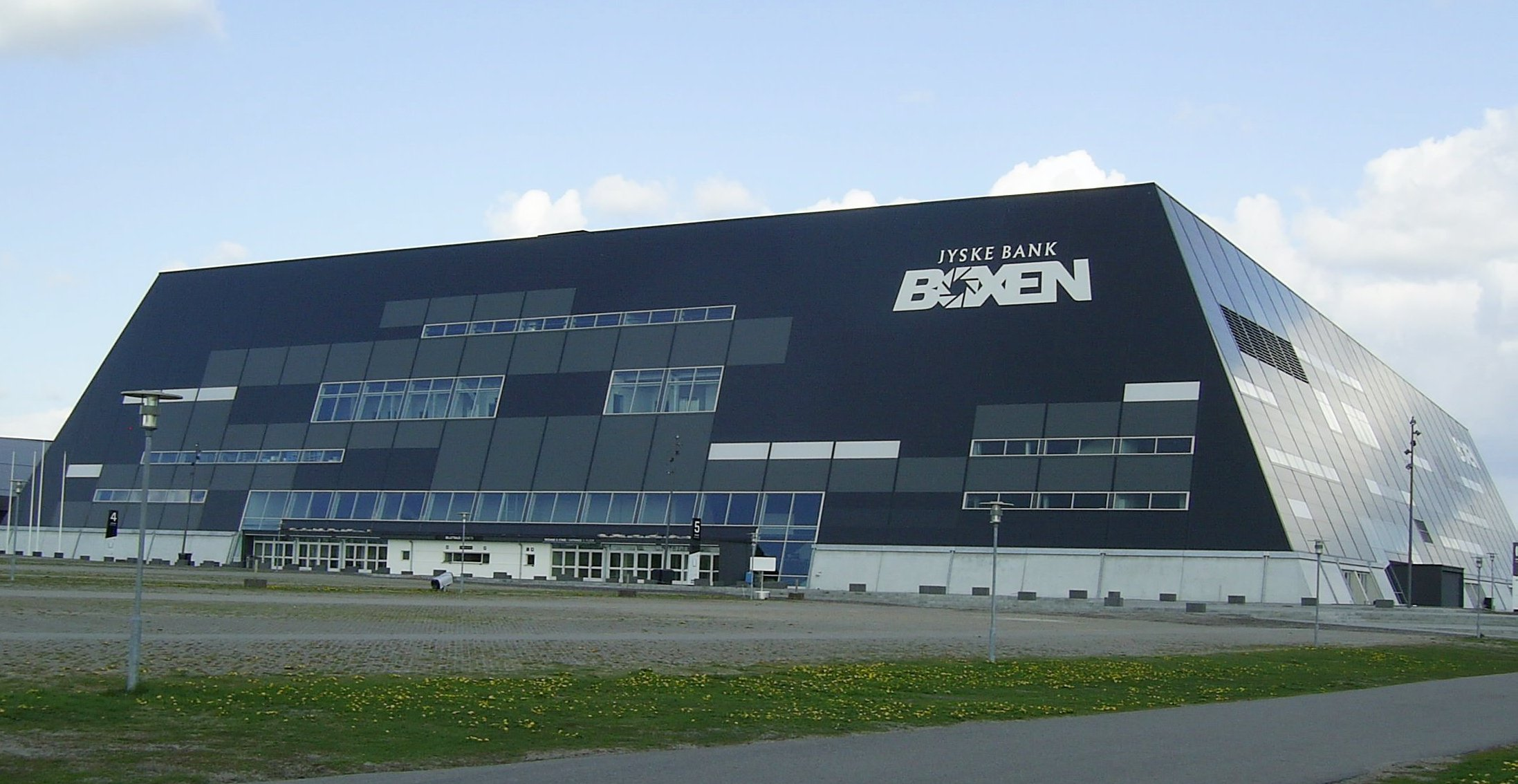
- The Jyske Bank Boxen hosted the final.
- Event: 2026 European Men's Handball Championship
Denmark	Germany
34	27
- Date: 25 January 2026
- Venue: Jyske Bank Boxen, Herning
- Man of the Match: (Denmark) Kevin Møller
- Referee: (Montenegro) Ivan Pavićević (Montenegro) Miloš Ražnatović

The 2026 European Men's Handball Championship final was the final match of the 2026 European Men's Handball Championship, the 17th edition of the biannual continental tournament in men's national handball teams, organised by Europe's governing aquatics body, European Handball Federation. The match was played at Jyske Bank Boxen in Herning, Denmark, on 1 February 2026, and was contested by co-hosts Denmark and Germany.

The tournament involved co-hosts Denmark, Norway and Sweden and 21 other teams. The 24 teams competed in a group stage, from which 12 teams qualified for the main round and 4 later advanced to the semifinals.

For Denmark, it is the fifth final and it is the fourth final for the Germans. This is the first time the two teams have met in a European Championship final, though it is not their first major final; they previously faced each other at the 2024 Olympic Games, where Denmark emerged victorious. Both sides had already met each other earlier in the tournament, with the Danes winning 31–26. Their last appearances for Denmark and Germany in the final were in 2024 and 2016 respectively.

Denmark won their third title after defeating Germany in the final.

== Route to the final ==
Note: In all results below, the score of the finalist is given first.

Denmark
Round
Germany
Opponent
Result
Preliminary round
Opponent
Result
North Macedonia
36–24
Match 1
Austria
30–27
Romania
39–24
Match 2
Serbia
27–30
Portugal
29–31
Match 3
Spain
34–32
Group B placement

Pos	Team	Pld	Pts
1	Portugal	3	5
2	Denmark	3	4
3	North Macedonia	3	3
4	Romania	3	0

Source: EHF
Final standings
Group A placement

Pos	Team	Pld	Pts
1	Germany	3	4
2	Spain	3	4
3	Austria	3	2
4	Serbia	3	2

Source: EHF
Opponent
Result
Main round
Opponent
Result
France
32–29
Match 4
Portugal
32–30
Spain
36–31
Match 5
Norway
30–28
Germany
31–26
Match 6
Denmark
26–31
Norway
38–24
Match 7
France
38–34
Group I placement

Pos	Team	Pld	Pts
1	Denmark (H)	5	8
2	Germany	5	8
3	Portugal	5	5
4	France	5	4
5	Norway (H)	5	3
6	Spain	5	2

Source: EHF
(H) Hosts
Final standings
Group I placement

Pos	Team	Pld	Pts
1	Denmark (H)	5	8
2	Germany	5	8
3	Portugal	5	5
4	France	5	4
5	Norway (H)	5	3
6	Spain	5	2

Source: EHF
(H) Hosts
Opponent
Result
Knockout stage
Opponent
Result
Iceland
31–28
Semifinals
Croatia
31–28

== Venue ==
The Jyske Bank Boxen hosted the final. This will be the second time they host the final, the first being in 2014.

2026 European Men's Handball Championship final is located in Denmark	Herning
2026 European Men's Handball Championship final is located in Denmark	Jyske Bank Boxen
2026 European Men's Handball Championship final is located in Denmark	Capacity: 15,000

== Match ==
1 February 2026; 18:00	Denmark	34–27	Germany	Jyske Bank Boxen, Herning; Attendance: 15,000; Referees: Pavićević, Ražnatović (MNE)
1 February 2026; 18:00	Pytlick 8	(18–16)	three players 5	Jyske Bank Boxen, Herning; Attendance: 15,000; Referees: Pavićević, Ražnatović (MNE)
1 February 2026; 18:00	3× (suspension)	Report	1× (yellow card) 3× (suspension) 2× (red card)	Jyske Bank Boxen, Herning; Attendance: 15,000; Referees: Pavićević, Ražnatović (MNE)

Denmark
Pos	Num	Player	Goals	Tot min	2 Min
RB	3	Niclas Kirkeløkke	2/3	35:10	1
LW	4	Magnus Landin	0	30:00	0
LW	7	Emil Jakobsen	3/6	29:02	0
CB	11	Rasmus Lauge	0/1	3:23	0
P	15	Magnus Saugstrup	1/1	60:00	0
RB	19	Mathias Gidsel	7/14	59:37	0
CB	22	Mads Mensah Larsen	0	9:20	0
P	25	Lukas Jørgensen	Inj		
RW	26	Jóhan á Plógv Hansen	7/8	13:04	0
LB	28	Lasse Andersson	DNP		
P	33	Emil Bergholt	NS		
P	34	Simon Hald	NS		
RB	38	Mads Hoxer	1/1	43:57	0
CB	42	Thomas Arnoldsen	5/6	40:37	1
LB	43	Simon Pytlick	8/12	34:12	1
RW	49	Frederik Bo Andersen	NS		
CB	59	Mads Svane Knudsen	DNP		
LB	64	Lasse Kjær Møller	DNP		
Goalkeepers
Num	Player		Tot sav	Min	Goals
12	Emil Nielsen		7/19 (37%)	23:11	0
20	Kevin Møller		8/23 (35%)	32:27	0
Head coach
Nikolaj Jacobsen

Denmark	Statistics	Germany
34/52	Goals	27/46
4	Turnovers	9
31 sec	Avr Time Attack	39 sec
15/42	Tot sav	14/48

Timeouts
Team	1st	2nd
Denmark	1	1
Germany	1	1

Germany
Pos	Num	Player	Goals	Tot min	2 Min
CB	3	Nils Lichtlein	2/3	5:07	
P	4	Johannes Golla	0	47:49	1
LB	5	Miro Schluroff	DNP		
LB	13	Matthes Langhoff	0	24:17	0
RW	14	Mathis Häseler	NS		
CB	14	Juri Knorr	5/11	33:24	0
RW	17	Lukas Zerbe	2/3	55:04	0
LB	18	Julian Köster	4/7	47:05	0
RB	23	Renārs Uščins	2/7	26:01	0
CB	30	Tom Kiesler (red card)	0	5:17	1
RB	32	Franz Semper	1/2	16:13	0
LW	34	Rune Dahmke	DNP		
LW	36	Lukas Mertens	1/1	46:21	0
54	P	Justus Fischer	NS		
LB	71	Marko Grgić	5/6	46:21	1
P	80	Jannik Kohlbacher (red card)	0/1	31:46	0
Goalkeepers
Num	Player		Tot sav	Min	Goals
1	David Späth		0/2 (0%)	1:47	0
33	Andreas Wolff		14/45 (31%)	52:22	0
Head coach
(Iceland) Alfreð Gíslason

Reserve referees:
(Slovenia) Bojan Lah
(Slovenia) David Sok
EHF Observer:
(Norway) Øyvind Togstad
EHF Supervisor:
(France) Denis Reibel
Timekeeper:
(Denmark) Svend Zachariassen
Scorekeeper:
(Denmark) Ernst Hoehrmann

Match rules

- Two halves of 30 minutes (60 minutes in total).
- 10 minutes of extra time if necessary.
- A second 10 minutes of extra time if necessary.
- Penalty shoot-out if scores still level.

== Squads ==
Denmark

No.	Pos.	Name	Date of birth (age)	Height	App.	Goals	Club
49	RW	Frederik Bo Andersen	9 December 1998 (aged 27)	1.86 m	3	5	(Germany) HSV Hamburg
28	LB	Lasse Andersson	11 March 1994 (aged 31)	1.96 m	86	122	(Germany) Füchse Berlin
33	P	Emil Bergholt	25 August 1997 (aged 28)	1.90 m	23	13	(Denmark) Skjern Håndbold
19	RB	Mathias Gidsel	8 February 1999 (aged 26)	1.90 m	95	578	(Germany) Füchse Berlin
38	RB	Mads Hoxer	6 December 2000 (aged 25)	1.95 m	10	24	(Denmark) Aalborg Håndbold
26	RW	Jóhan á Plógv Hansen	1 May 1994 (aged 31)	1.90 m	109	195	(Denmark) Skanderborg Aarhus Håndbold
7	LW	Emil Jakobsen	24 January 1998 (aged 27)	1.90 m	100	359	(Germany) SG Flensburg-Handewitt
34	P	Simon Hald	28 September 1994 (aged 31)	2.03 m	112	116	(Denmark) Aalborg Håndbold
25	P	Lukas Jørgensen (Note: Replaced by Thomas Arnoldsen from the main round onwards.)	31 March 1999 (aged 26)	1.94 m	61	174	(Germany) SG Flensburg-Handewitt
3	RB	Niclas Kirkeløkke	26 March 1994 (aged 31)	1.95 m	107	202	(Germany) SG Flensburg-Handewitt
59	CB	Mads Svane Knudsen	25 March 2002 (aged 23)	1.85 m	0	0	(Denmark) Bjerringbro-Silkeborg
4	LW	Magnus Landin	20 August 1995 (aged 30)	2.00 m	161	296	(Germany) THW Kiel
11	CB	Rasmus Lauge	20 June 1991 (aged 34)	1.95 m	184	465	(Denmark) Bjerringbro-Silkeborg
22	CB	Mads Mensah Larsen	12 August 1991 (aged 34)	1.88 m	216	338	(Denmark) Skjern Håndbold
20	GK	Kevin Møller	20 June 1989 (aged 36)	2.00 m	94	7	(Germany) SG Flensburg-Handewitt
64	LB	Lasse Kjær Møller	11 June 1996 (aged 29)	1.99 m	19	22	(Germany) SG Flensburg-Handewitt
12	GK	Emil Nielsen	10 March 1997 (aged 28)	1.95 m	68	6	(Spain) FC Barcelona
43	LB	Simon Pytlick	11 December 2000 (aged 25)	1.93 m	60	278	(Germany) SG Flensburg-Handewitt
15	P	Magnus Saugstrup (c)	12 July 1996 (aged 29)	1.95 m	105	205	(Germany) SC Magdeburg

Germany

No.	Pos.	Name	Date of birth (age)	Height	App.	Goals	Club
34	LW	Rune Dahmke	10 April 1993 (aged 32)	1.89 m	94	137	(Germany) THW Kiel
54	P	Justus Fischer	6 February 2003 (aged 22)	1.93 m	32	40	(Germany) TSV Hannover-Burgdorf
4	P	Johannes Golla (c)	5 November 1997 (aged 28)	1.95 m	106	370	(Germany) SG Flensburg-Handewitt
71	LB	Marko Grgic	11 September 2003 (aged 22)	1.98 m	29	88	(Germany) SG Flensburg-Handewitt
14	RW	Mathis Häseler	25 June 2002 (aged 23)	1.90 m	4	7	(Germany) VfL Gummersbach
30	CB	Tom Kiesler	24 April 2001 (aged 24)	1.93 m	2	0	(Germany) VfL Gummersbach
15	CB	Juri Knorr	9 May 2000 (aged 25)	1.94 m	81	311	(Denmark) Aalborg Håndbold
80	P	Jannik Kohlbacher	19 July 1995 (aged 30)	1.90 m	126	239	(Germany) Rhein-Neckar Löwen
18	LB	Julian Köster	16 March 2000 (aged 25)	2.03 m	73	192	(Germany) VfL Gummersbach
13	LB	Matthes Langhoff	30 March 2002 (aged 23)	1.93 m	1	1	(Germany) Füchse Berlin
3	CB	Nils Lichtlein	31 July 2002 (aged 23)	1.83 m	29	32	(Germany) Füchse Berlin
36	LW	Lukas Mertens	22 March 1996 (aged 29)	1.82 m	68	151	(Germany) SC Magdeburg
5	LB	Miro Schluroff	25 April 2000 (aged 25)	1.98 m	6	13	(Germany) VfL Gummersbach
32	RB	Franz Semper	5 July 1997 (aged 28)	1.91 m	28	59	(Germany) SC DHfK Leipzig
1	GK	David Späth	29 April 2002 (aged 23)	2.00 m	44	3	(Germany) Rhein-Neckar Löwen
23	RB	Renārs Uščins	29 April 2002 (aged 23)	1.89 m	43	172	(Germany) TSV Hannover-Burgdorf
33	GK	Andreas Wolff	3 March 1991 (aged 34)	1.98 m	185	15	(Germany) THW Kiel
17	RW	Lukas Zerbe	17 January 1996 (aged 29)	1.84 m	45	98	(Germany) THW Kiel
