= Helmut Kosmehl =

German handball player and handball/football manager

Personal information
- Date of birth: 27 September 1944 (age 82)
- Place of birth: Magdeburg, Germany
- Position: Forward

Senior career*
Years	Team	Apps	(Gls)
1964–1975	VfL Gummersbach (handball)		
1975–1976	Spandauer SV (football)		

International career
	Germany (handball)	27	(14)

Managerial career
- 1976–1988: Mauritius
- 1991: Spear Motors FC
- 1992: BSV Stahl Brandenburg
- 1992–1993: Seychelles
- 2000: Dominica
- * Club domestic league appearances and goals

Helmut Kosmehl (born 27 September 1944 in Magdeburg) is a German professional handball and football player and football manager.

== Career ==
He joined West Germany in 1964 and engages VfL Gummersbach with whom he won four League handball champions in 1967, 1970, 1971 and 1974. He has 27 caps for 14 goals with Germany men's national handball team.

In 1975, he joined to the second division football club Spandauer SV has lost its first 14 league games and two meetings with the hassle club. The club finished last in the league not winning just twice in 36 games, and cashes 115 goals during the season.

Helmut Kosmehl moved to Switzerland in 1976 and engages with the handball club Pfadi Winterthur He coached the Mauritius, Seychelles and Dominica Seychelles national football teams.

In 2008, he was appointed to the direction of AmaZulu FC training center in South Africa.
