= Feldhoff =

Feldhoff is a surname. Notable people with the surname include:

- Jochen Feldhoff (born 1943), German handball player
- Markus Feldhoff (born 1974), German footballer and manager
