= Rune Dahmke =

German handball player (born 1993)

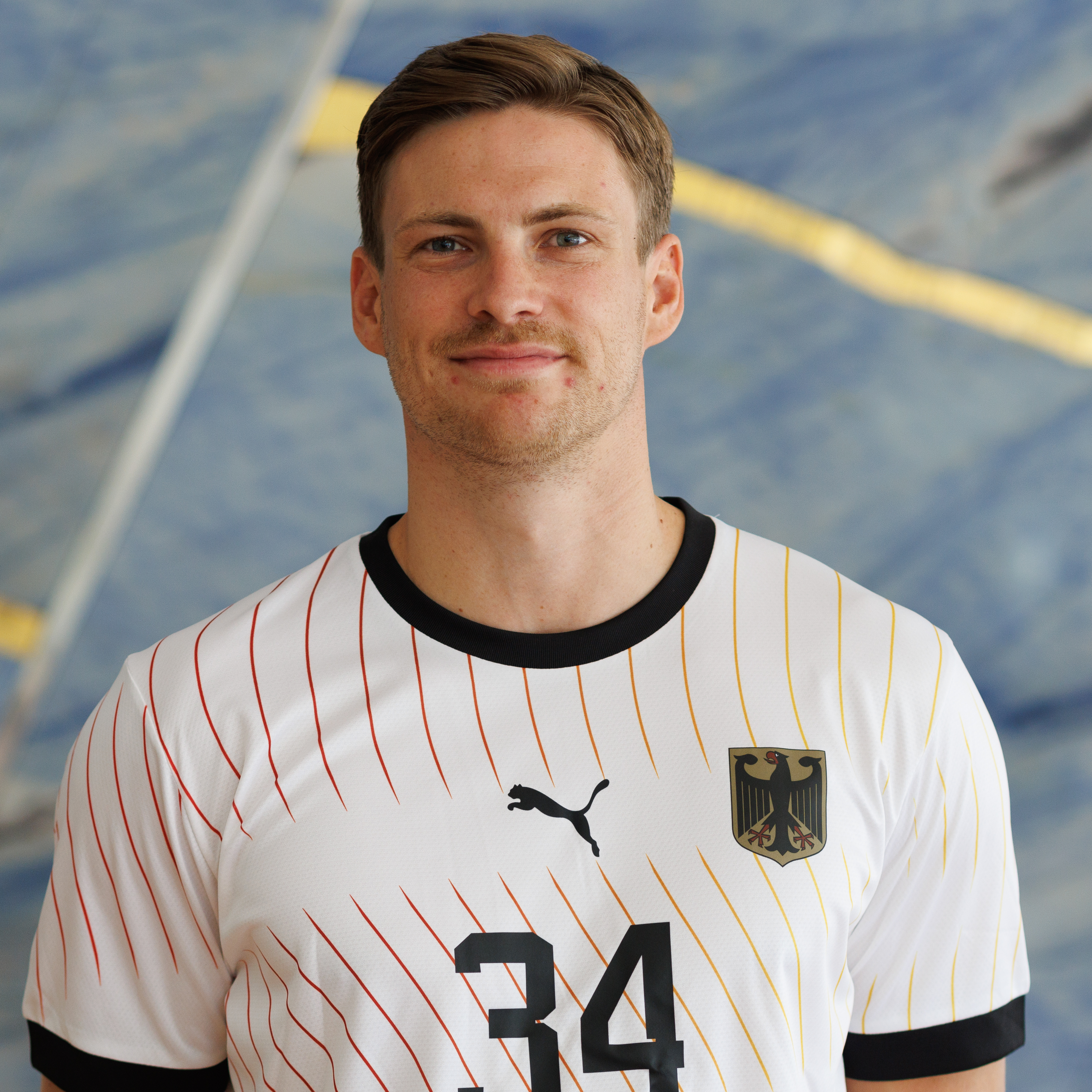
- Dahmke in 2024

Personal information
- Nationality: German
- Born: 10 April 1993 (age 33) Kiel, Germany
- Height: 1.90 m (6 ft 3 in)

Sport
- Sport: Handball
- Position: Left wing
- Current club: THW Kiel
- Number: 23

Youth career
- Years: Team
- –2008: SV Mönkeberg
- 2008–2012: THW Kiel

Senior clubs
- Years: Team
- 2012–2014: TSV Altenholz
- 2014–: THW Kiel
National team
Years	Team	Apps	(Gls)
2015–	Germany	102	(139)
Medal record
Olympic Games
Silver medal – second place	2024 Paris	Team
European Championship
Gold medal – first place	2016 Poland
Silver medal – second place	2026 Denmark/Norway/Sweden
- Updated on 8 November 2026

Rune Dahmke (born 10 April 1993) is a German professional handball player for THW Kiel and the Germany national team.

He was a part of the German team, that won gold medals at the 2016 European Men's Handball Championship. He was also on the German team that won silver medals at the 2024 Olympics.

== Career ==
Dahmke started playing handball at SV Mönkeberg and joined THW Kiel in 2008. In 2012 to 2014 he played for the 3. Liga side TSV Altenholz, while also playing for THW Kiel in the EHF Champions League. He made his debut in a 28:25 win over Romanian HCM Constanța, where he played for 2.5 minutes. With TSV Altenholz he was promoted to the 2. Bundesliga in the 2013–14 season.

The following season he became fully a part of the senior team at THW Kiel, where he signed a two-year deal, replacing Guðjón Valur Sigurðsson, who had left for FC Barcelona.

With Kiel he has won the DHB Supercup 6 times, the German Championship 4 times, the DHB-Pokal 3 times, as well as the EHF Cup and EHF Champions League.

=== Season statistics ===
Season	Team	League	Games	Goals	Penalty goals	Outfield goals
2014/15	THW Kiel	Bundesliga	28	47	3	44
2015/16	THW Kiel	Bundesliga	30	88	9	79
2016/17	THW Kiel	Bundesliga	28	63	0	63
2017/18	THW Kiel	Bundesliga	27	52	0	52
2018/19	THW Kiel	Bundesliga	34	43	0	43
2019/20	THW Kiel	Bundesliga	26	26	0	26
2020/21	THW Kiel	Bundesliga	37	82	0	82
2021/22	THW Kiel	Bundesliga	31	38	0	38
2022/23	THW Kiel	Bundesliga	32	40	0	40
2023/24	THW Kiel	Bundesliga	33	73	0	73
2024/25	THW Kiel	Bundesliga	31	55	0	55
2014–2025	Total	Bundesliga	337	607	12	595

Source: Spielerprofil bei der Handball-Bundesliga

=== National team ===
In November 2015 he was included in the German national team for the first time under Dagur Sigurðsson for the Super Cup against Brazil, Serbia and Slovenia. He would make his debut against Brazil in a 29:20 win. Jannik Kohlbacher made his debut in the same match.

In 2016 he won gold medals at the 2016 European Championship, beating Spain in the final 24:17.

At the 2018 European Championship he was not initially part of Christian Prokop's team, but was included later in the main round.

At the 2022 European Championship he was once again included in the German team during the tournament, this time being included after the second game. In 2024 he was part of the team that finished 4th at the 2024 European Championship.

At the 2024 Olympics in Paris he was part of the German reserves, and entered the team after the first match, when Tim Hornke was injured. At this tournament he won silver medals, losing to Denmark in the final. For this he was awarded the Silbernes Lorbeerblatt. At the 2025 World Championship he finished 6th with the German team, once again going out against Denmark.

At the 2026 European Men's Handball Championship he won silver medals, losing to Denmark in the final.

== Personal life ==
Dahmke's father, Frank Dahmke, also played for THW Kiel, between 1981 and 1991. Since February 2014 he has been a member of the THW Kiel supervisory board.

He is married to fellow handballer, Stine Bredal Oftedal. Their daughter, Amelie was born in July 2025.

== Honours ==
- European Championship:
  - Gold: 2016
- Summer Olympics:
  - Silver: 2024
- EHF Champions League:
  - Gold: 2020
- EHF Cup:
  - Gold: 2019
- Handball-Bundesliga:
  - Gold: 2015, 2020, 2021, 2023
- DHB-Pokal
  - Gold: 2017, 2019, 2022, 2025
- DHB-Supercup:
  - Gold: 2014, 2015, 2020, 2021, 2022, 2023
