= 2019–20 DHB-Pokal =

Handball tournament

The 2019–20 DHB-Pokal was the 44th edition of the German Handball Cup. TBV Lemgo won the tournament, beating MT Melsungen in the final.

== Format ==
The first round was split in a north and a south part and played in mini tournaments where only the winner advanced to the round of 16. From there on a knockout system was used to determine the winner. The final four was played on one weekend in Hamburg.

== Round 1 ==
The draw was held on 18 June 2019. The matches were played on 17 and 18 August 2019.

Team 1	Score	Team 2
North
Played in Lübeck
Mecklenburger Stiere Schwerin	24–35	SG Flensburg-Handewitt
VfL Gummersbach	20–25	VfL Lübeck-Schwartau
SG Flensburg-Handewitt	30–14	VfL Lübeck-Schwartau
Played in Habenhausen
TUSEM Essen	34–21	1. VfL Potsdam
TSV Hannover-Burgdorf	42–25	ATSV Habenhausen
TUSEM Essen	25–34	TSV Hannover-Burgdorf
Played in Burscheid
HSG Bergische Panther	24–30	Wilhelmshavener HV
Eintracht Hildesheim	26–37	TBV Lemgo
Wilhelmshavener HV	23–40	TBV Lemgo
Played in Minden
GWD Minden	21–31	ASV Hamm-Westfalen
HC Empor Rostock	31–29	Oranienburger HC
ASV Hamm-Westfalen	28–19	HC Empor Rostock
Played in Nordhorn-Lingen
TSV Altenholz	27–40	SC DHfK Leipzig
HSG Nordhorn-Lingen	34–26	SG Schalksmühle-Halver Dragons
SC DHfK Leipzig	31–21	HSG Nordhorn-Lingen
Played in Baunatal
TV Emsdetten	35–33	Dessau-Rosslauer HV 06
THW Kiel	43–23	Eintracht Baunatal
TV Emsdetten	23–39	THW Kiel
Played in Northeim
SC Magdeburg	41–26	Northeimer HC
VfL Eintracht Hagen	30–29	Handball Hamburg
SC Magdeburg	46–17	VfL Eintracht Hagen
Played in Spenge
HSG Krefeld	22–35	Füchse Berlin
TuS Nettelstedt-Lübbecke	30–18	TuS Spenge
Füchse Berlin	23–21	TuS Nettelstedt-Lübbecke

Team 1	Score	Team 2
South
Played in Aue
TSG Friesenheim	27–23	SG Leutershausen
EHV Aue	27–25	HSG Konstanz
TSG Friesenheim	31–26	EHV Aue
Played in Balingen Weilstetten
TV Grosswallstadt	36–34	Longericher SC
HBW Balingen-Weilstetten	28–36	HSG Wetzlar
TV Grosswallstadt	27–30	HSG Wetzlar
Played in Pforzheim
Bergischer HC	35–23	TGS Pforzheim
TuS Fürstenfeldbruck	28–31	HC Elbflorenz Dresden
Bergischer HC	28–22	HC Elbflorenz Dresden
Played in Rodgau-Nieder-Roden
SG BBM Bietigheim	28–27	HSG Rodgau-Nieder-Roden
MT Melsungen	31–24	DJK Rimpar Wölfe
SG BBM Bietigheim	25–31	MT Melsungen
Played in Saarlouis
TuS Ferndorf	36–28	SG Nußloch
Rhein-Neckar Löwen	46–23	HG Saarlouis
TuS Ferndorf	17–30	Rhein-Neckar Löwen
Played in Aachen
TV Bittenfeld	29–24	HSC 2000 Coburg
BTB Aachen 1908	33–34 (OT)	TSB Heilbronn-Horkheim
TV Bittenfeld	31–27	TSB Heilbronn-Horkheim
Played in Göppingen
TSV Bayer Dormagen	28–24	HC Rhein Vikings
Frisch Auf Göppingen	38–24	TuS 04 Dansenberg
TSV Bayer Dormagen	24–33	Frisch Auf Göppingen
Played in Hanau
ThSV Eisenach	23–30	HC Erlangen
TV Hüttenberg	21–23	HSG Hanau
HC Erlangen	28–14	HSG Hanau

== Round of 16 ==
The draw was held on 21 August 2019. The matches were played between 25 September and 3 October 2019.

25 September 2019; 20:00	TV Bittenfeld	30–26	HC Erlangen	Scharrena Stuttgart, Stuttgart; Attendance: 710; Referees: Helbig, Geipel
25 September 2019; 20:00	Lonn 8	(13–12)	Sellin 6	Scharrena Stuttgart, Stuttgart; Attendance: 710; Referees: Helbig, Geipel
25 September 2019; 20:00	3× (yellow card) 4× (suspension)	Report	2× (yellow card) 1× (suspension)	Scharrena Stuttgart, Stuttgart; Attendance: 710; Referees: Helbig, Geipel

1 October 2019; 19:00	Füchse Berlin	31–30	SC Magdeburg	Max-Schmeling-Halle, Berlin; Attendance: 7,692; Referees: Regner, Koppl
1 October 2019; 19:00	Lindberg 7	(15–16)	Musche 9	Max-Schmeling-Halle, Berlin; Attendance: 7,692; Referees: Regner, Koppl
1 October 2019; 19:00	3× (yellow card) 4× (suspension)	Report	3× (yellow card) 6× (suspension)	Max-Schmeling-Halle, Berlin; Attendance: 7,692; Referees: Regner, Koppl

1 October 2019; 19:00	SC DHfK Leipzig	27–30	MT Melsungen	Arena Leipzig, Leipzig; Attendance: 4,342; Referees: Klein, Immel
1 October 2019; 19:00	Roscheck 6	(12–13)	Marić 7	Arena Leipzig, Leipzig; Attendance: 4,342; Referees: Klein, Immel
1 October 2019; 19:00	3× (yellow card) 1× (suspension)	Report	3× (yellow card) 5× (suspension) 1× (red card)	Arena Leipzig, Leipzig; Attendance: 4,342; Referees: Klein, Immel

2 October 2019
19:00
Rhein-Neckar Löwen
36–34 (ET)
Frisch Auf Göppingen
SAP Arena, Mannheim
Attendance: 3,753
Referees: Loppaschewski, Blümel
Schmid 10
(14–16)
Schiller 7
2× (yellow card) 8× (suspension)
Report
2× (yellow card) 4× (suspension)

FT: 29–29 ET: 7–5

2 October 2019; 19:00	TBV Lemgo	27–24	Bergischer HC	Lipperlandhalle, Lemgo; Attendance: 2,678; Referees: Baumgart, Wild
2 October 2019; 19:00	Elísson 7	(12–12)	three players 4	Lipperlandhalle, Lemgo; Attendance: 2,678; Referees: Baumgart, Wild
2 October 2019; 19:00	3× (yellow card) 3× (suspension)	Report	2× (yellow card) 2× (suspension)	Lipperlandhalle, Lemgo; Attendance: 2,678; Referees: Baumgart, Wild

2 October 2019; 19:00	ASV Hamm-Westfalen	24–25	TSG Friesenheim	Westpress Arena, Hamm; Attendance: 2,012; Referees: Merz, Schilha
2 October 2019; 19:00	three players 4	(14–13)	Durak, Müller 6	Westpress Arena, Hamm; Attendance: 2,012; Referees: Merz, Schilha
2 October 2019; 19:00	3× (yellow card) 4× (suspension)	Report	2× (yellow card) 4× (suspension)	Westpress Arena, Hamm; Attendance: 2,012; Referees: Merz, Schilha

2 October 2019; 20:00	HSG Wetzlar	25–26	THW Kiel	Rittal Arena Wetzlar, Wetzlar; Attendance: 3,734; Referees: Schulze, Tönnies
2 October 2019; 20:00	Čavor 10	(14–12)	Ekberg 6	Rittal Arena Wetzlar, Wetzlar; Attendance: 3,734; Referees: Schulze, Tönnies
2 October 2019; 20:00	2× (yellow card) 4× (suspension)	Report	2× (yellow card) 2× (suspension)	Rittal Arena Wetzlar, Wetzlar; Attendance: 3,734; Referees: Schulze, Tönnies

3 October 2019; 17:00	SG Flensburg-Handewitt	20–26	TSV Hannover-Burgdorf	Flens-Arena, Flensburg; Attendance: 4,855; Referees: Schneider, Hartmann
3 October 2019; 17:00	Gottfridsson 6	(9–15)	Kastening, Olsen 5	Flens-Arena, Flensburg; Attendance: 4,855; Referees: Schneider, Hartmann
3 October 2019; 17:00	3× (yellow card) 4× (suspension)	Report	3× (yellow card) 2× (suspension)	Flens-Arena, Flensburg; Attendance: 4,855; Referees: Schneider, Hartmann

== Quarterfinals ==
The draw was held on 3 October 2019. The matches were played on 3 and 4 December 2019.

3 December 2019; 19:00	MT Melsungen	33–30	Füchse Berlin	Rothenbach-Halle, Melsungen; Attendance: 4,168; Referees: Baumgart, Wild
3 December 2019; 19:00	Kühn 9	(14–16)	Lindberg 12	Rothenbach-Halle, Melsungen; Attendance: 4,168; Referees: Baumgart, Wild
3 December 2019; 19:00	3× (yellow card) 6× (suspension)	Report	3× (yellow card) 4× (suspension) 1× (red card)	Rothenbach-Halle, Melsungen; Attendance: 4,168; Referees: Baumgart, Wild

3 December 2019; 19:00	TSG Friesenheim	23–26	TBV Lemgo	Friedrich-Ebert-Halle, Ludwigshafen; Attendance: 2,350; Referees: Schneider, Hartmann
3 December 2019; 19:00	Falk 8	(9–12)	Theuerkauf 6	Friedrich-Ebert-Halle, Ludwigshafen; Attendance: 2,350; Referees: Schneider, Hartmann
3 December 2019; 19:00	3× (yellow card) 5× (suspension)	Report	3× (yellow card) 2× (suspension)	Friedrich-Ebert-Halle, Ludwigshafen; Attendance: 2,350; Referees: Schneider, Hartmann

3 December 2019; 20:00	TV Bittenfeld	34–35	THW Kiel	Scharrena Stuttgart, Stuttgart; Attendance: 2,095; Referees: Zupanovic, Thone
3 December 2019; 20:00	Schmidt 7	(15–18)	Ekberg 10	Scharrena Stuttgart, Stuttgart; Attendance: 2,095; Referees: Zupanovic, Thone
3 December 2019; 20:00	3× (yellow card) 2× (suspension)	Report	3× (yellow card) 1× (suspension)	Scharrena Stuttgart, Stuttgart; Attendance: 2,095; Referees: Zupanovic, Thone

4 December 2019; 20:00	Rhein-Neckar Löwen	30–31	TSV Hannover-Burgdorf	SAP Arena, Mannheim; Attendance: 7,620; Referees: Tönnies, Schulze
4 December 2019; 20:00	Schmid 16	(14–17)	Olsen 10	SAP Arena, Mannheim; Attendance: 7,620; Referees: Tönnies, Schulze
4 December 2019; 20:00	1× (yellow card) 2× (suspension)	Report	1× (yellow card) 6× (suspension)	SAP Arena, Mannheim; Attendance: 7,620; Referees: Tönnies, Schulze

== Final four ==
The draw was held on 9 December 2019. The matches would have been played on 4 and 5 April 2020. Due to the COVID-19 pandemic the league postponed the final four on 12 March 2020 and moved it back to after the season. On 4 May, the matches were scheduled to 27 and 28 February 2021 but was moved back later on. It took place on 3 and 4 June 2021.

=== Bracket ===
Semifinals
3 June
MT Melsungen	27
TSV Hannover-Burgdorf	24
3 June
TBV Lemgo	29
THW Kiel	28

Final
4 June
TBV Lemgo	28
MT Melsungen	24

=== Semifinals ===
3 June 2021; 17:00	TBV Lemgo	29–28	THW Kiel	Barclaycard Arena, Hamburg; Attendance: 2,000; Referees: Schneider, Hartmann
3 June 2021; 17:00	Elísson, Schagen 6	(11–18)	Ekberg, Pekeler 6	Barclaycard Arena, Hamburg; Attendance: 2,000; Referees: Schneider, Hartmann
3 June 2021; 17:00	2× (yellow card)	Report	1× (yellow card) 2× (suspension)	Barclaycard Arena, Hamburg; Attendance: 2,000; Referees: Schneider, Hartmann

3 June 2021; 19:30	MT Melsungen	27–24	TSV Hannover-Burgdorf	Barclaycard Arena, Hamburg; Attendance: 1,600; Referees: Loppaschewski, Blümel
3 June 2021; 19:30	Kühn 7	(14–10)	Martinović 8	Barclaycard Arena, Hamburg; Attendance: 1,600; Referees: Loppaschewski, Blümel
3 June 2021; 19:30	6× (suspension)	Report	1× (yellow card) 3× (suspension) 1× (red card)	Barclaycard Arena, Hamburg; Attendance: 1,600; Referees: Loppaschewski, Blümel

=== Final ===
4 June 2021; 17:30	TBV Lemgo	28–24	MT Melsungen	Barclaycard Arena, Hamburg; Attendance: 2,000; Referees: Tönnies, Schulze
4 June 2021; 17:30	Carlsbogård, Zerbe 5	(15–12)	Pavlović 6	Barclaycard Arena, Hamburg; Attendance: 2,000; Referees: Tönnies, Schulze
4 June 2021; 17:30	1× (yellow card) 2× (suspension)	Report	1× (yellow card) 2× (suspension)	Barclaycard Arena, Hamburg; Attendance: 2,000; Referees: Tönnies, Schulze
