= Wolfgang Schwenke (handballer) =

German handball player (born 1968)

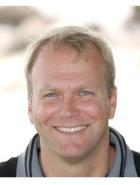
- Wolfgang Schwenke in 2007

Personal information
- Nationality: German
- Born: 27 March 1968 (age 58) Flensburg, West Germany
- Height: 196 cm (77 in)

Sport
- Sport: Handball
- Position: Left back

Senior clubs
- Years: Team
- 1976–1987: VfL Bad Schwartau
- 1987–1995: THW Kiel
- 1996–1996: VfL Bad Schwartau
- 1996–2001: THW Kiel
National team
Years	Team	Apps	(Gls)
1990-?	Germany	53	(96)

Wolfgang Schwenke (born 27 March 1968) is a German former handball player. He competed in the men's tournament at the 1992 Summer Olympics.
