= Uwe Schwenker =

German handball player (born 1959)

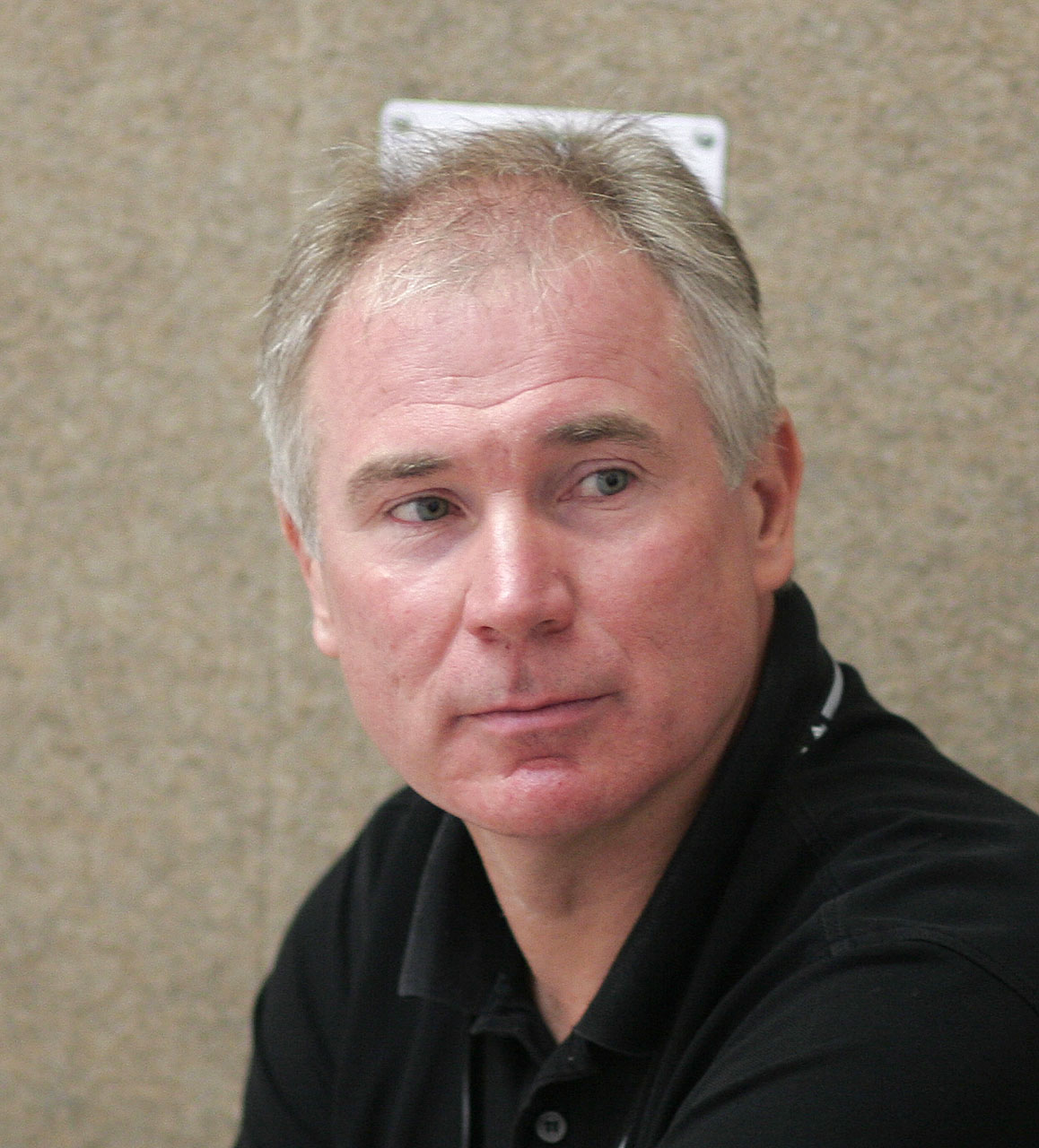
- Schwenker in 2007

Personal information
- Born: 24 March 1959 (age 67) Bremen, West Germany
- Height: 1.86 m (6 ft 1 in)

Sport
- Sport: Handball
- Position: Left back

Senior clubs
- Years: Team
- 1978–1980: TV Grambke-Bremen
- 1980–1992: THW Kiel
- 1993–1994: THW Kiel
National team
| Years | Team | Apps | (Gls) |
| – | West Germany | 72 | (164) |
Medal record
Men's handball
Representing West Germany
Olympic Games
| Silver medal – second place | 1984 Los Angeles | Team |

Uwe Schwenker (born 24 March 1959) is a West German former handball player who competed in the 1984 Summer Olympics.

He was a member of the West German handball team which won the silver medal. He played one match and scored seven goals.
