= Jonathan Carlsbogård =

Swedish handball player (born 1995)

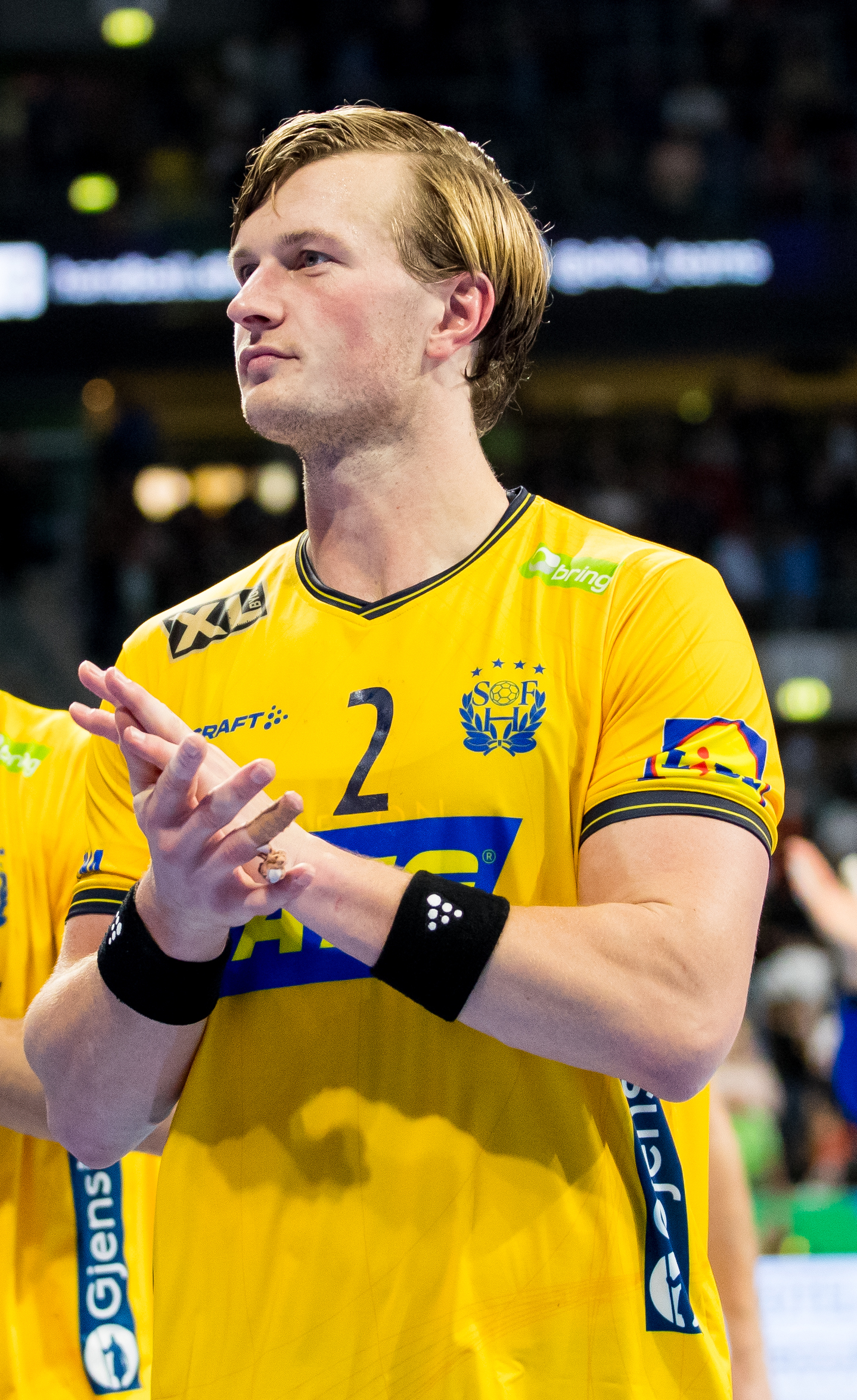
- Carlsbogård with the Sweden national team in 2022

Personal information
- Nationality: Swedish
- Born: 19 April 1995 (age 31) Gothenburg, Sweden
- Height: 1.95 m (6 ft 5 in)

Sport
- Sport: Handball
- Position: Left back
- Current club: FC Barcelona
- Number: 9

Youth career
- Years: Team
- –: Kärra HF
- –: Redbergslids IK

Senior clubs
- Years: Team
- –2013: Kärra HF
- 2013–2018: Redbergslids IK
- 2018–2022: TBV Lemgo
- 2022–: FC Barcelona
National team
Years	Team	Apps	(Gls)
2020–	Sweden	90	(175)
Medal record
World Championship
Silver medal – second place	2021 Egypt
European Championship
Gold medal – first place	2022 Hungary/Slovakia
Bronze medal – third place	2024 Germany
- Updated on 14 January 2026

Jonathan Carlsbogård (born 19 April 1995) is a Swedish professional handball player for FC Barcelona and the Sweden national team.

At club level, Carlsbogård has won seven titles playing for clubs in Germany and Spain. With the Sweden national team, he won the 2022 European Championship, placed second at the 2021 World Championship and finished third at the 2024 European Championship. In 2023, Carlsbogård received the Swedish Handball Player of the Year award by the Swedish Handball Association.

== Honours ==
=== Club ===
TBV Lemgo

- DHB-Pokal
  - Gold: 2020
- DHB-Supercup
  - Silver: 2021

FC Barcelona

- EHF Champions League
  - Gold: 2024
  - Bronze: 2023
- Liga ASOBAL
  - Gold: 2023, 2024
- Copa ASOBAL
  - Gold: 2023, 2024
- Copa del Rey
  - Gold: 2023, 2024
- Supercopa Ibérica
  - Gold: 2022, 2023
- IHF Super Globe
  - Silver: 2022
  - Bronze: 2023

=== International ===
- IHF World Championship
  - Silver: 2021
- EHF European Championship
  - Gold: 2022
  - Bronze: 2024

=== Individual awards ===
- Swedish Handballer of the Year: 2023
