= Olaf Berner =

German teacher and handball player (born 1949)

Personal information
- Nationality: German
- Born: 31 August 1949 (age 77) Itzehoe, West Germany
- Height: 1.84 m (6 ft 0 in)

Sport
- Sport: Handball
- Position: Left wing
- Current club: Retired

Senior clubs
- Years: Team
- –1978: THW Kiel
- 1978–1995: TSV Altenholz
- 1995–: THW Kiel IV

Olaf Berner (born 31 August 1949) is a German teacher and former team handball player.

Olaf Berner is member of THW Kiel since the early 1960s. He left the club two times for playing with the TSV Altenholz at the Handball-Bundesliga, but both times he returned to the THW. From 1976 to 1978 he played for the THW at the Handball-Bundesliga. During the 1977/78 season he was the captain of the Zebras.

Berner is geography and sports teacher. He is married and has two children.

Since July 2012 Olaf Berner is president of the THW Kiel.
