= Børge Lund =

Norwegian handball player (born 1979)

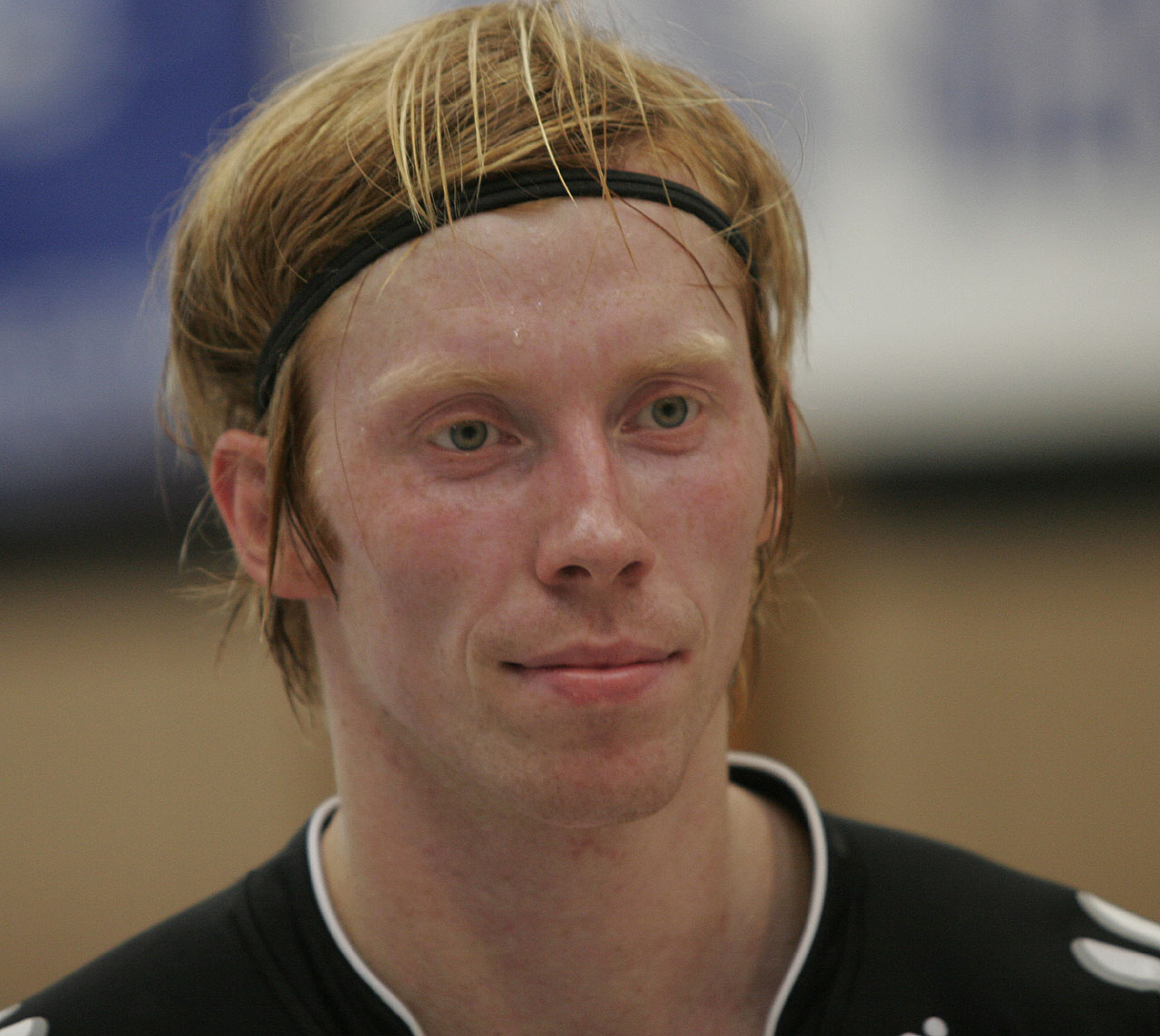
- Lund in 2007

Personal information
- Nationality: Norwegian
- Born: 13 March 1979 (age 47) Bodø, Norway
- Height: 1.96 m (6 ft 5 in)

Sport
- Sport: Handball
- Position: Central back

Senior clubs
- Years: Team
- –2002: Bodø HK
- 2002–2006: AaB Håndbold
- 2006–2007: HSG Nordhorn
- 2007–2010: THW Kiel
- 2010–2012: Rhein-Neckar Löwen
- 2012–2013: Füchse Berlin
- 2013–2016: Bodø HK
National team
Years	Team	Apps	(Gls)
2000–2014	Norway	216	(390)

Teams managed
- 2016–2021: Norway (assistant coach)
- 2020-2026: Elverum Handball
- 2026-: THW Kiel

Børge Lund (born 13 March 1979) is a retired Norwegian handball player and current handball coach of THW Kiel. He played 216 matches and scored 390 goals for the Norway men's national handball team between 2000 and 2014. He participated at the 2005 and 2007 World Men's Handball Championship, as well in the 2011 World Men's Handball Championship and the 2012 and 2014 European Men's Handball Championship.

Lund was awarded the Håndballstatuetten trophy from the Norwegian Handball Federation in 2019.
