= Klaus Kater =

German handball player (born 1948)

Klaus Kater (born 16 June 1948 in Marienheide) is a former West German handball player who competed in the 1972 Summer Olympics.

He made his first steps on the handball court in Kotthausen. For VfL Gummersbach, he played from 1966 until 1976. In 1977, he moved to the third division, Bayer Leverkusen, with whom he rose several times in the second and first division. Particularly well known that he was to face the seven-meter throw as close as possible in front of the shooter to cover the gate better and so provoke missed shots. That was not unusual. The successful method found many imitators, and it had to be installed to protect a mark in the goal crease in the allowable distance of three meters.

In 1972, he was part of the West German team which finished sixth in the Olympic tournament. He played five matches as goalkeeper.

The trained toolmaker has two children. Since 1978, he works for the Bayer plant in Leverkusen owned media company Dynevo GmbH. He is currently retired.
