= Predrag Timko =

Serbian handball player (born 1948)

Predrag Timko (born July 27, 1948, SR BiH) is a Bosnia- born handball player who competed for Yugoslavia in the 1976 Summer Olympics.

In 1976 he was part of the Yugoslav team which finished fifth in the Olympic tournament. He played three matches and scored two goals. He appeared in 25 national team-A selections, and 40 national team-B selections.

He played for RK Krivaja from Zavidovići, THW Kiel, and Füchse Berlin. Predrag is a Top scorer in German Bundesliga in Season 1979/80, 26 matches, 178/97 goals. Timko scored 465 goals in 106 Bundesliga games.
