= Mathis Häseler =

German handball player (born 2002)

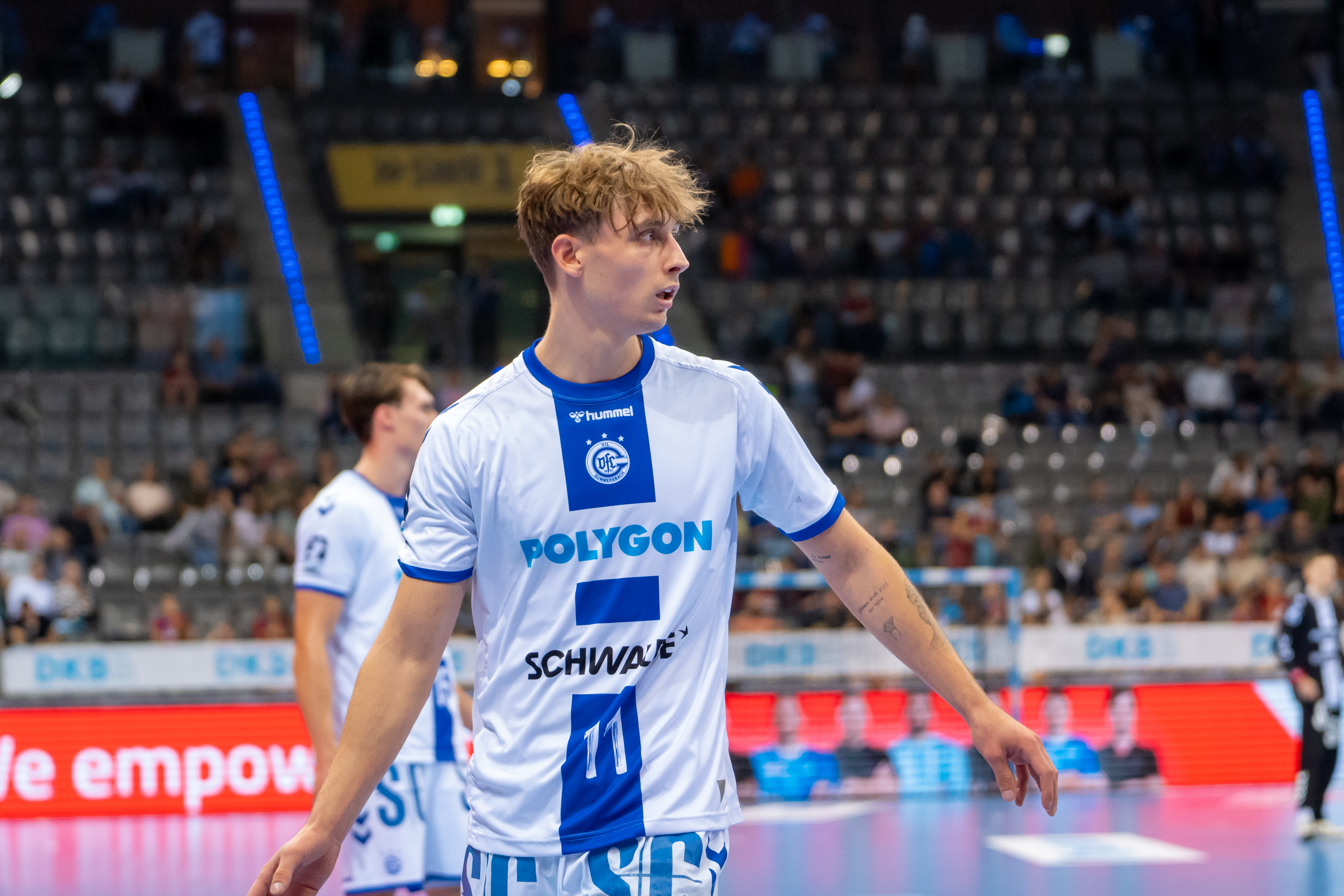
- Mathis Häseler in 2024

Personal information
- Nationality: German
- Born: 25 June 2002 (age 24) Lünen, Germany
- Height: 1.90 m (6 ft 3 in)

Sport
- Sport: Handball
- Position: Right wing
- Current club: VfL Gummersbach
- Number: 11

Youth career
- Years: Team
- 2014–2020: VfL Gummersbach

Senior clubs
- Years: Team
- 2020–: VfL Gummersbach
National team
Years	Team	Apps	(Gls)
2025–	Germany	14	(20)
Medal record
European Championship
Silver medal – second place	2026 Denmark/Norway/Sweden
- Updated on 8 November 2026

Mathis Häseler (born 25 June 2002) is a German handball player.

== Career ==
Häseler has played his entire career for VfL Gummersbach. He was promoted to the first team in 2020. In 2022 he helped the team getting promoted to the Handball-Bundesliga.

== National team ==
With the German youth team he won a silver medal at the 2019 European Youth Olympic Festival He later won gold medals at the 2023 IHF Men's U21 Handball World Championship.

He made his debut for the German senior team in May 2025 against Switzerland. His first major international tournament was the 2026 European Men's Handball Championship, where Germany won silver medals, losing to Denmark in the final.
