= Justus Fischer =

German handball player (born 2003)

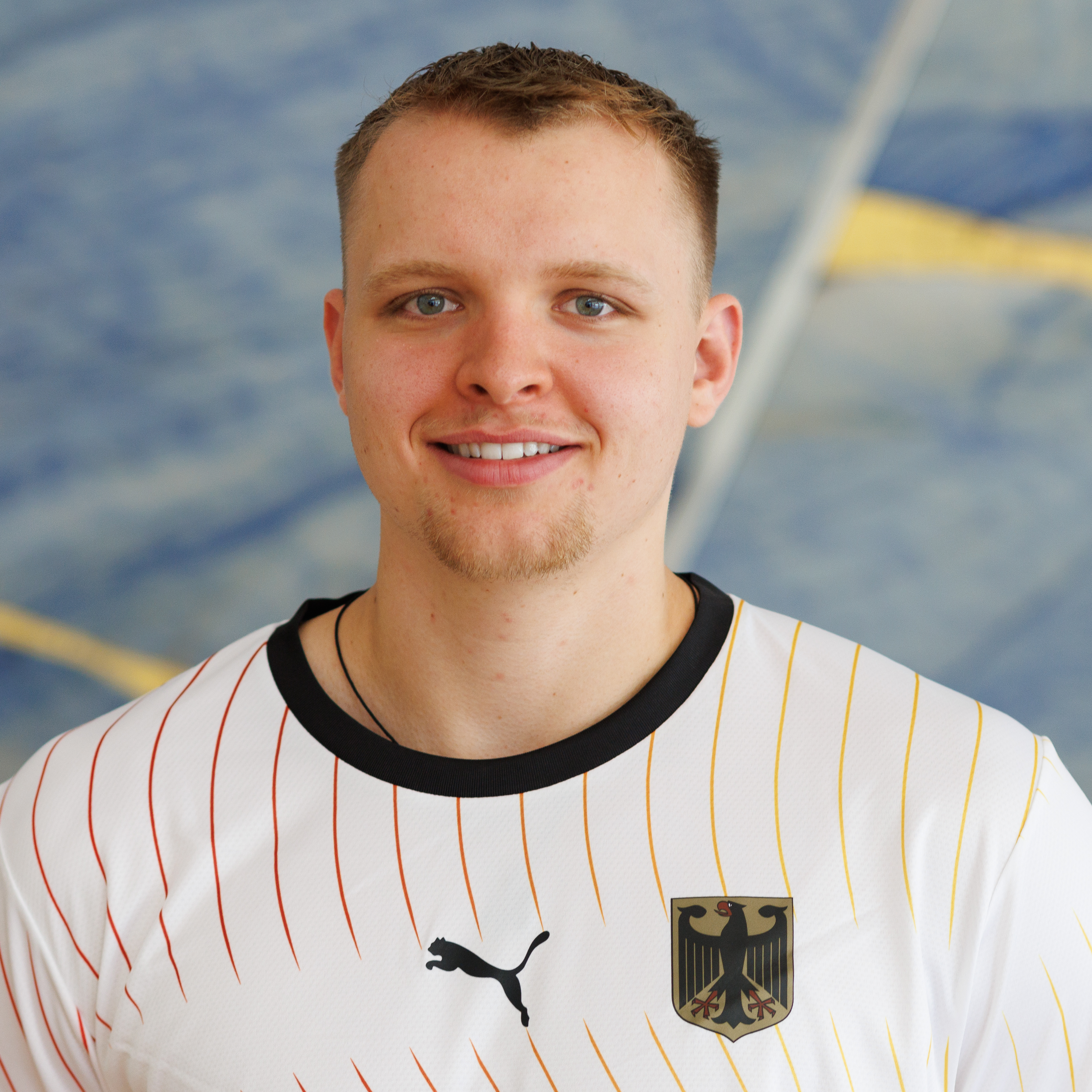
- Fischer in 2024

Personal information
- Nationality: German
- Born: 6 February 2003 (age 23) Hanover, Germany
- Height: 1.94 m (6 ft 4 in)

Sport
- Sport: Handball
- Position: Pivot
- Current club: TSV Hannover-Burgdorf
- Number: 54

Senior clubs
- Years: Team
- 2020–: TSV Hannover-Burgdorf
National team
Years	Team	Apps	(Gls)
2023–	Germany	47	(72)
Medal record
Men's handball
Representing Germany
Olympic Games
Silver medal – second place	2024 Paris	Team
European Championship
Silver medal – second place	2026 Denmark/Norway/Sweden
European Youth Summer Olympic Festival
Silver medal – second place	2019 Baku
- Updated on 8 November 2026

Justus Fischer (born 6 February 2003) is a German handball player who plays for TSV Hannover-Burgdorf and the German national team.

== Club career ==
Fischer has been playing for TSV Hannover-Burgdorf since the C-youth team. At the age of 16, he made his debut with the men in the 3rd division. In the 2019–20 DHB-Pokal, he was in the professional squad for the first time. In the 2020–21 Bundesliga season, he made his debut in the German top flight. In October 2022, he signed his first professional contract with the "Recken", valid until 2025.

== International career ==
With the German U-17 national team, Fischer won the silver medal at the 2019 European Youth Olympic Festival in Azerbaijan. With the U-19 national team, he became European champion at the 2021 U-19 European Championship in Croatia. The team won the title at the 2023 U-21 World Championship in Germany and Greece. Fischer was also voted into the All-Star team as the best pivot.

Before the 2023 World Championship, national coach Alfred Gislason called up Fischer to the extended squad of the German senior national team. He made his debut for the national team on 27 April 2023 in the 23–32 defeat against Sweden in Kristianstad. Three days later, he scored his first two goals in the 32:31 win against Spain in Berlin. He was in the squad for the 2024 European Championship and finished 4th with Germany.

At the 2026 European Men's Handball Championship he won silver medals, losing to Denmark in the final.
