= Nils Lichtlein =

German handball player (born 2002)

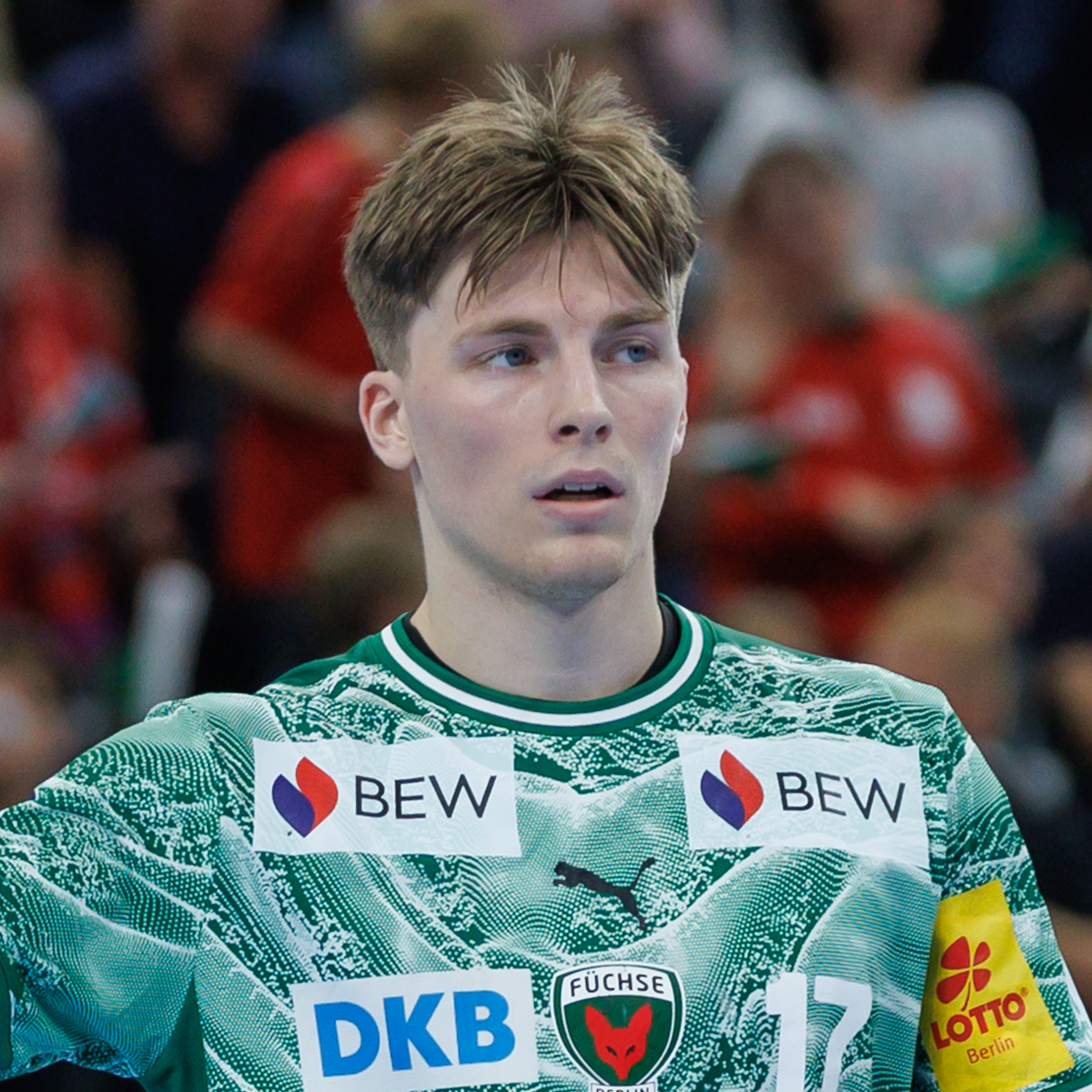
- Lichtlein in 2025

Personal information
- Nationality: German
- Born: 31 July 2002 (age 24) Regensburg, Germany
- Height: 1.83 m (6 ft 0 in)

Sport
- Sport: Handball
- Position: Right back, centre back
- Current club: Füchse Berlin
- Number: 17

Senior clubs
- Years: Team
- 2007–2016: ESV 1927 Regensburg
- 2016–: Füchse Berlin
National team
Years	Team	Apps	(Gls)
2023–	Germany	40	(56)
Medal record
European Championship
Silver medal – second place	2026 Denmark/Norway/Sweden
Junior World Championship
Gold medal – first place	2023 Germany/Greece
- Updated on 8 November 2026

Nils Lichtlein (born 31 July 2002) is a German handball player, for the German Bundesliga team Füchse Berlin.

== Career ==
Lichtlein started playing handball at the local club ESV 1927 Regensburg, where he won the Bavarian championship in 2015. In 2016 he joined Füchse Berlin, where he started in the youth ranks. With the Füchse youth team he won the youth Bundesliga in 2017-18.

From 2021 to 2023 he played for the B-team 1. VfL Potsdam in the 2. Handball-Bundesliga. A ligament injury held him out for most of the 2021–22 season.

In 2023 he won the EHF European League with Füchse Berlin. Two seasons later he won the 2024–25 Handball-Bundesliga, which was the first in club history. The same season he played in the 2024–25 EHF Champions League final, where Füchse lost to league rivals SC Magdeburg.

He debuted for the German national team on 3 November 2023 against Egypt. His first major international tournament was the 2024 European Championship. At the 2026 European Men's Handball Championship he won silver medals, losing to Denmark in the final.

== Personal life ==
Lichtlein was born in Regensburg, Germany. His grandfather, Artur Lichtlein, his uncle, Carsten Lichtlein and his mother, Silke Lichtlein, were also handball players.
