= Julian Köster =

German handball player (born 1989)

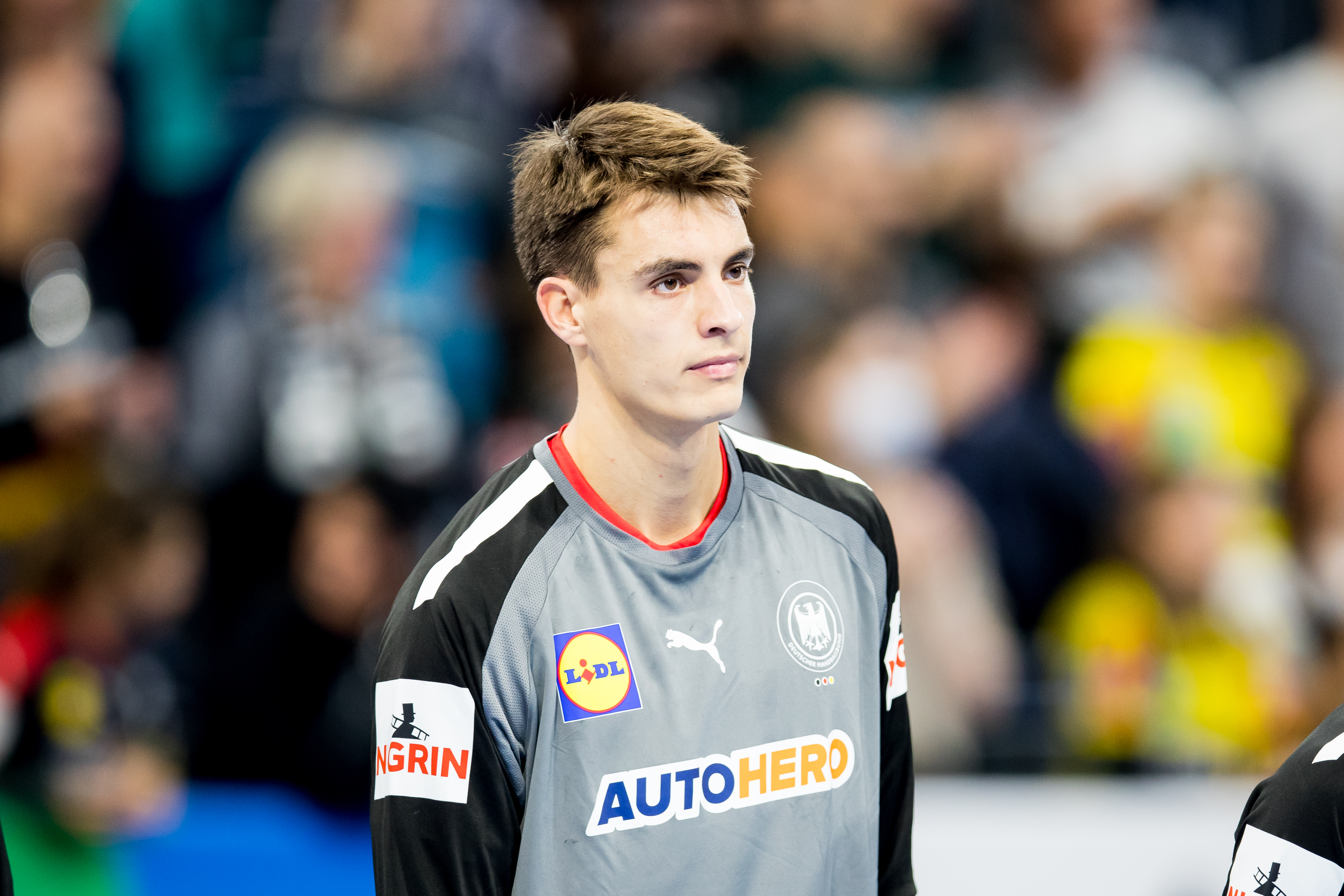
- Köster in 2022

Personal information
- Nationality: German
- Born: 16 March 2000 (age 26) Bielefeld, Germany
- Height: 2.00 m (6 ft 7 in)

Sport
- Sport: Handball
- Position: Left back
- Current club: VfL Gummersbach
- Number: 7

Youth career
- Years: Team
- –: TuS SW Brauweiler
- 2015–2018: TSV Bayer Dormagen

Senior clubs
- Years: Team
- 2018–2020: TSV Bayer Dormagen
- 2020–2026: VfL Gummersbach
- 2026–: THW Kiel
National team
Years	Team	Apps	(Gls)
2021–	Germany	87	(237)
Medal record
Olympic Games
Silver medal – second place	2024 Paris	Team
European Championship
Silver medal – second place	2026 Denmark/Norway/Sweden
Youth World Championship
Silver medal – second place	2019 North Macedonia
- Updated on 8 November 2026

Julian Köster (born 16 March 2000) is a German handball player for VfL Gummersbach and the German national team.

== Career ==
=== Club career ===
Having started at TuS SW Brauweiler, Köster completed his youth team career at TSV Bayer Dormagen, a team he would make his senior handball debut with in 2018, playing in the 2. Bundesliga. In 2020, the German switched to league rivals VfL Gummersbach, signing a contract until 2024. His team earned promotion to the Bundesliga in the 2022 season, one which automatically triggered a one-year contract extension in Köster's contract. He became captain of the team in 2022, and signed on to play for Gummersbach until 2026 following a tenth-placed finish in the 2022–23 Bundesliga campaign.

=== National team ===
Köster made his international debut on the German national team on 21 September 2021. He participated at the 2021 World Men's Handball Championship in Egypt. Afterwards, Köster took part in the 2022 European Championship, where he played in all seven matches and became Germany's second-highest scorer with 18 goals. He once again became the second-highest scorer for Germany at the 2024 Euros, where his 31 goals helped Germany finish fourth.

At the 2026 European Men's Handball Championship he won silver medals, losing to Denmark in the final.

== Individual awards ==
Best Defender

- Best Defender of the IHF Men's Youth World Championship: 2019
