= Handball at the 2019 European Youth Summer Olympic Festival =

- Venue: ABU Arena + Baku Sports Hall
- Dates: 22–27 July
- Competitors: 240 from 14 nations

Handball competitions of the 2019 European Youth Summer Olympic Festival was held in ABU Arena and Baku Sports Hall from 22 to 27 July 2019.

== Medal summary ==
=== Medal table ===
Rank	Nation	Gold	Silver	Bronze	Total
1	Croatia (CRO)	1	0	0	1
1	France (FRA)	1	0	0	1
3	Germany (GER)	0	1	0	1
3	Netherlands (NED)	0	1	0	1
5	Denmark (DEN)	0	0	1	1
5	Hungary (HUN)	0	0	1	1
Totals (6 entries)		2	2	2	6

=== Medalists ===
Event	Gold	Silver	Bronze
Boys	Croatia; Dominik Kuzmanović; Mislav Trninić; Marin Lisac; Ivan Barbić; Rok Malin; Matija Car; Fabijan Grubišić; Jakov Neralić; Mario Zakić; Matej Svržnjak; Matej Mandić; Zlatko Raužan; Mislav Obradović; David Štrković; Adam Šalić	Germany; Tim Freihöfer; Felix Eißing; Carl Haake; David Kuntscher; Matiss Häseler; Paul Kompenhans; Renārs Uščins; Maxim Orlov; Lorenz Rinn; Niclas Heitkamp; Fynn Nicolaus; Ole Pregler; Lasse Ludwig; Oskar Neudeck; Justus Fischer	Denmark; Mikkel Møller Løvkvist; Thomas Sommer Arnoldsen; Frederik Arnoldsen; Lucas Garsdal; Lukas Goller; Lasse Højgaard; Livio Klausen; Tobias Bonde Mygind; Julius Mørch-Rasmussen; Viktor Nevers; Lasse Pedersen; Carl Emil Wettendorff; Mikkel Lang Rasmussen; Mads Jacob Kragh Thomsen; Victor Foged Wolf
Girls	France; Léna Grandveau; Mathilde Cayez; Inès Segur; Kiara Tshimanga; Ève Barlet; Clara Vaxes; Mathilde Thouvenot; Lucie Modenel; Inès Naceur; Lucie Callegher; Iona Stemmer; Cassidy Chambonnier; Sarah Bouktit; Mélanie Halter; Charlène Guerrier	Netherlands; Senna van Gallen; Sam de Borst; Rianne van Rijnsoever; Pam Korsten; Malene Froeling; Jessie van de Ruit; Romé Steverink; Astrid Uitslag; Jette van Ingen; Lisa Vlug; Kim Molenaar; Esma Alice Staal; Lynn Kuipers; Britt Maarchalkerweerd; Pipy Wolfs	Hungary; Blanka Vajer; Borbála Ballai; Eszter Pál; Anna Kukely; Brigitta Csekő; Krisztina Tóth; Blanka Pődör; Lilly Török; Noémi Takács; Csenge Csatlós; Diána Rónai; Diána Világos; Zsófia Mlinkó; Panna Zsigmond; Gréta Sápi

== Participating nations ==
A total of 240 athletes from 14 nations competed in handball at the 2019 European Youth Summer Olympic Festival:

- Azerbaijan (30)
- Croatia (15)
- Czech Republic (15)
- Denmark (15)
- France (30)
- Germany (15)
- Hungary (15)
- Iceland (15)
- Netherlands (15)
- Romania (15)
- Spain (15)
- Serbia (15)
- Slovenia (15)
- Switzerland (15)
