= Lukas Zerbe =

German handball player (born 1996)

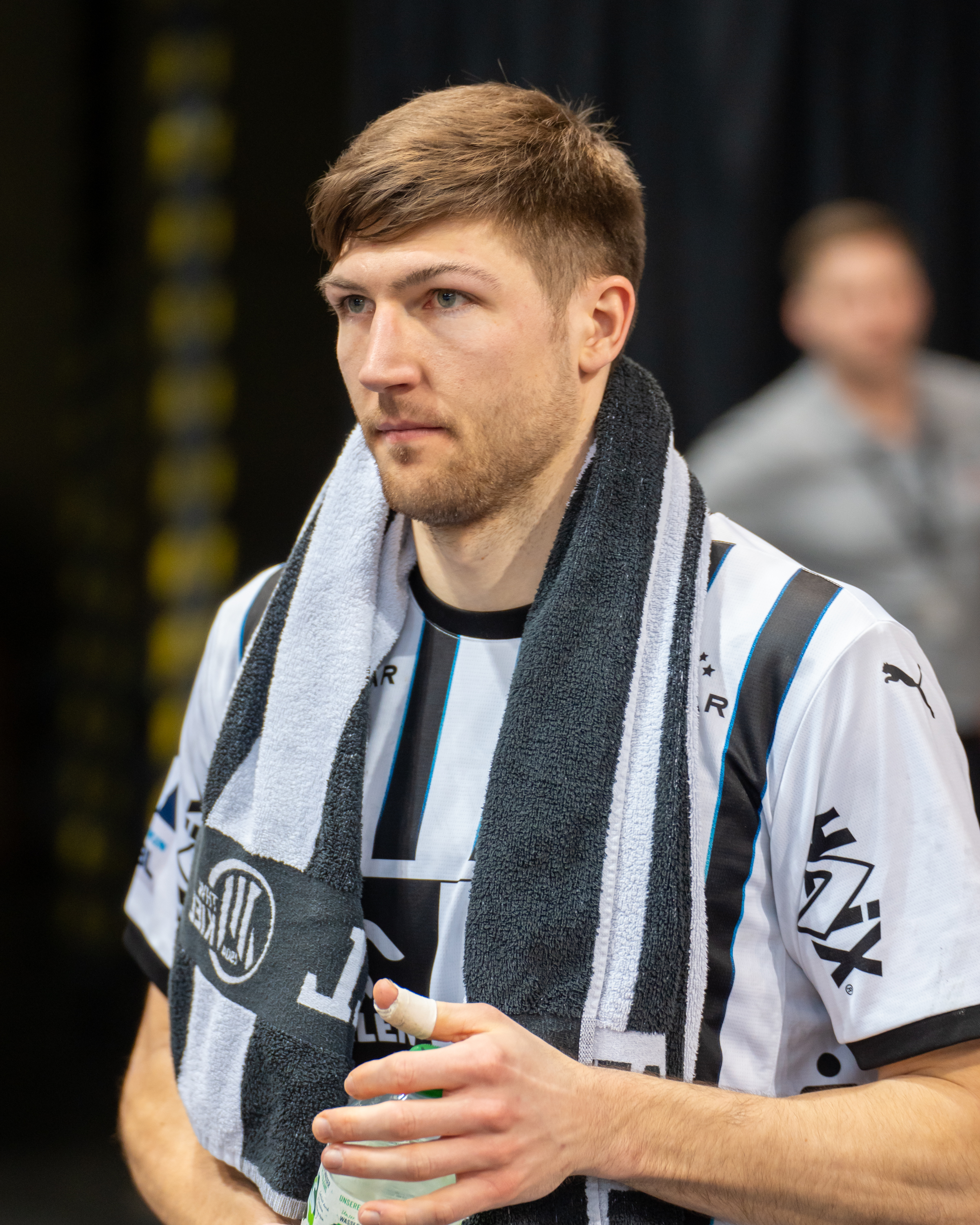
- Zerbe in 2026

Personal information
- Nationality: German
- Born: 17 January 1996 (age 30) Lemgo, Germany
- Height: 1.84 m (6 ft 0 in)

Sport
- Sport: Handball
- Position: Right wing
- Current club: THW Kiel
- Number: 24

Senior clubs
- Years: Team
- –2018: TBV Lemgo
- 2018–2019: TuS Ferndorf
- 2019–2024: TBV Lemgo Lippe
- 2024–: THW Kiel
National team
Years	Team	Apps	(Gls)
2021–	Germany	58	(146)
Medal record
European Championship
Silver medal – second place	2026 Denmark/Norway/Sweden
- Updated on 8 November 2026

Lukas Zerbe (born 17 January 1996) is a German handballer who plays as a right winger for THW Kiel and the German national team.

== Career ==
Zerbe was Lemgo's joint top-scorer with five goals in the 2019–20 DHB-Pokal final against MT Melsungen, which they won 28–24. He made his debut for the national team in 2021, in a friendly match against Portugal. He was the captain of Lemgo. Though selected to represent his country at the 2024 European Men's Handball Championship, he made just two appearances and scored once. For the 2024–25 season, he will join the record German champion, THW Kiel, to replace Niclas Ekberg. At the 2026 European Men's Handball Championship he won silver medals, losing to Denmark in the final.

== Private life ==
He is the nephew of former German national team player and European champion Volker Zerbe.

== Achievements ==
- DHB-Pokal
  - Gold: 2020, 2025
