= Christian Prokop =

German handball player (born 1978)

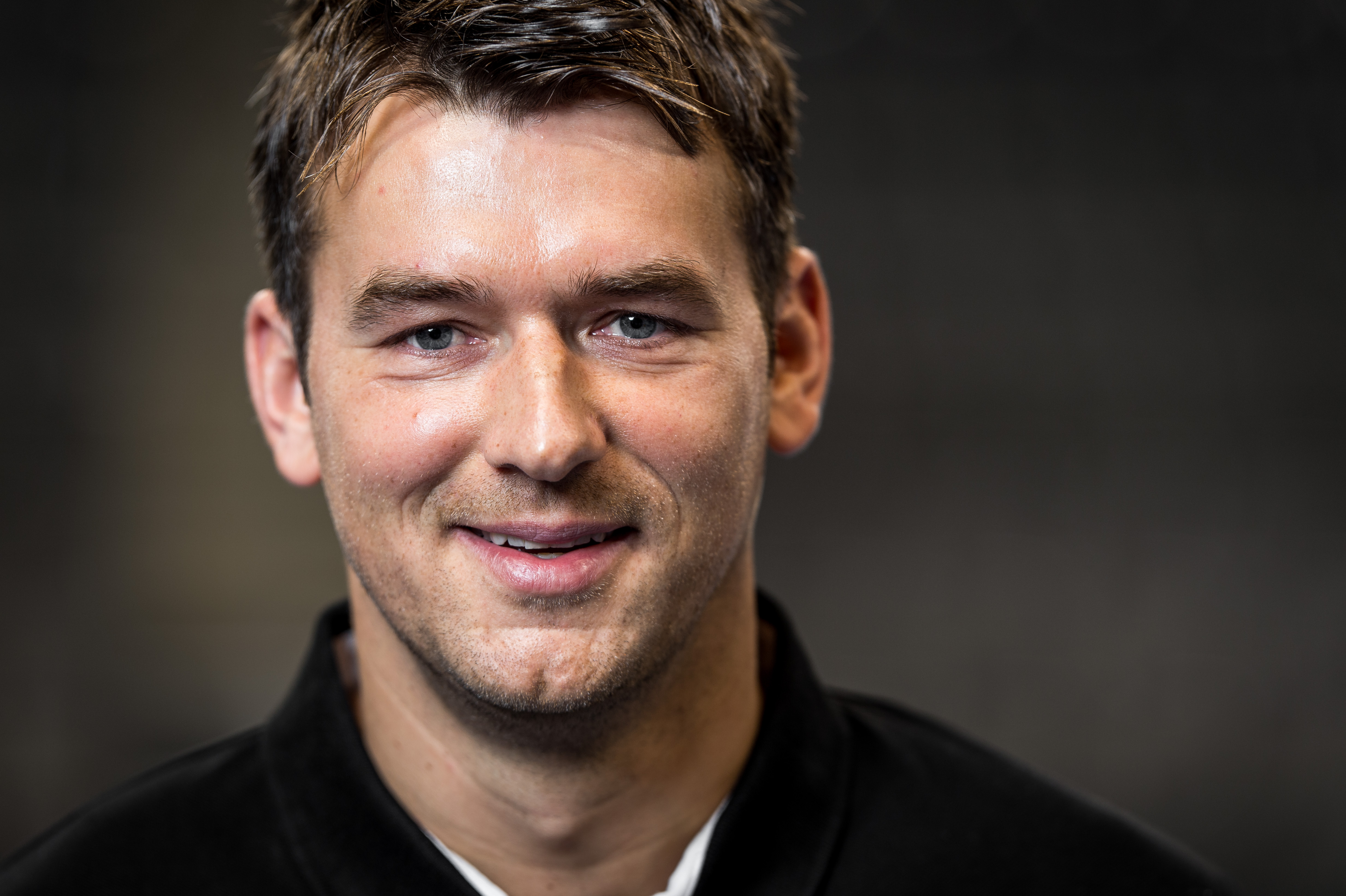
- Prokop in 2018

Personal information
- Nationality: German
- Born: 24 December 1978 (age 47) Köthen, East Germany
- Height: 1.90 m (6 ft 3 in)

Sport
- Sport: Handball
- Position: Centre back

Senior clubs
- Years: Team
- –1998: SV Bernburg
- 1998–2000: Dessauer HV
- 2000–2001: HC Wuppertal
- 2001–2003: GWD Minden
- 2003: HG 85 Köthen

Teams managed
- 2003–2004: Eintracht Hildesheim
- 2005–2006: MTW Braunschweig
- 2006–2009: TSV Hannover-Anderten
- 2009–2011: SC Magdeburg II
- 2011–2012: SV Post Schwerin
- 2012–2013: TUSEM Essen
- 2013–2017: SC DHfK Leipzig
- 2017–2020: Germany
- 2021–: Hannover-Burgdorf

Christian Prokop (born 24 December 1978) is a German handball retired professional player and current coach. He last served as the German national team head coach.
