= Jochen Feldhoff =

German handball player (born 1943)

Jochen Feldhoff (born 10 September 1943) is a former West German handball player who competed in the 1972 Summer Olympics. He has been awarded the Silbernes Lorbeerblatt.

In 1972 he was part of the West German team which finished sixth in the Olympic tournament. He played two matches.

He played for SSV Marienheide and VfL Gummersbach. With Gummersbach he won the German Championship in 1967, 1969, 1973 and 1974. In 1967, 1970, 1971 and 1974 he also won the European Cup.
