= Tom Kiesler =

German handball player (born 2001)

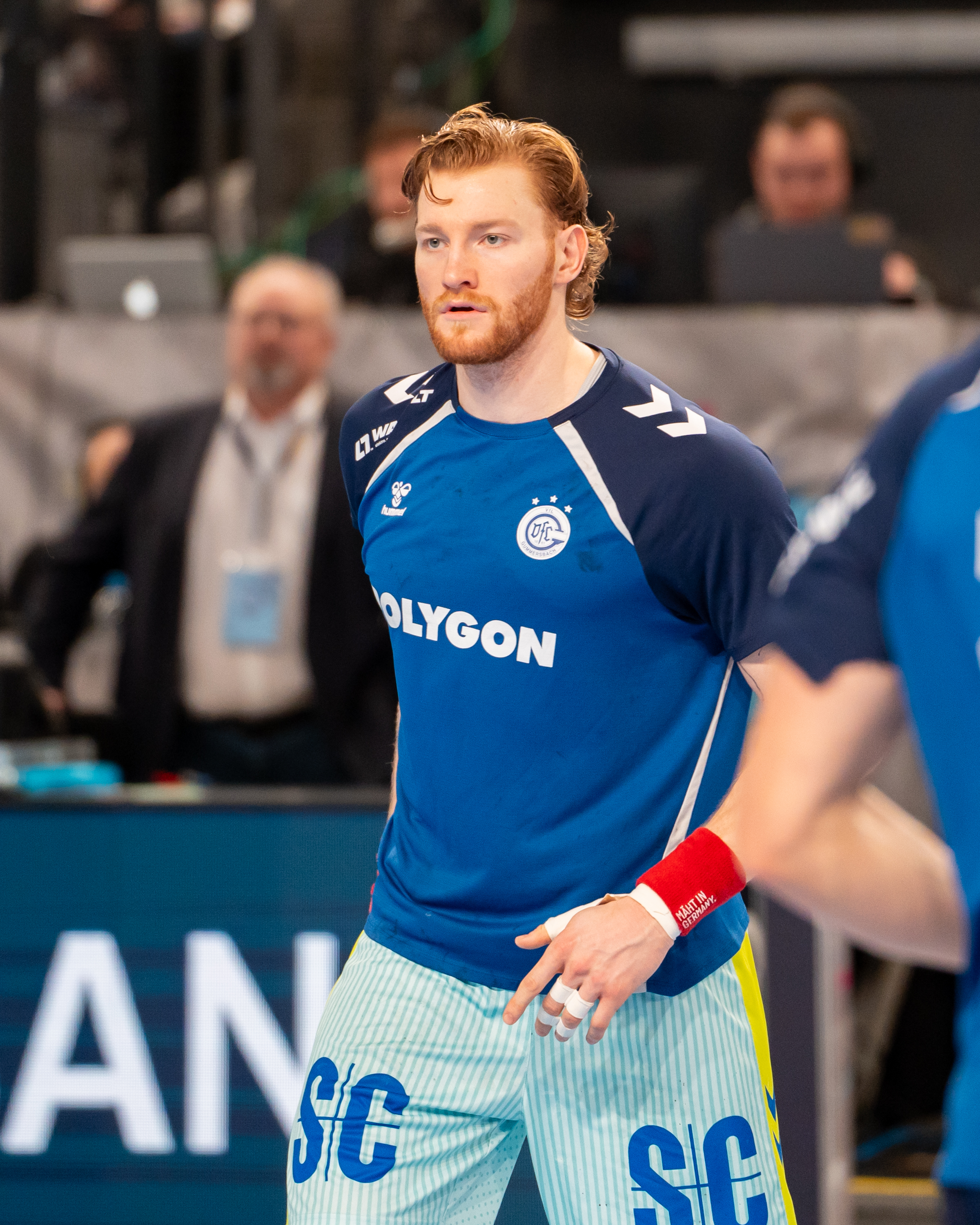
- Kiesler in 2025

Personal information
- Nationality: German
- Born: 24 April 2001 (age 25) Bad Soden, Germany
- Height: 1.91 m (6 ft 3 in)

Sport
- Sport: Handball
- Position: Pivot
- Current club: VfL Gummersbach
- Number: 30

Youth career
- Years: Team
- –: VfL Gummersbach

Senior clubs
- Years: Team
- 2019–: VfL Gummersbach
National team
Years	Team	Apps	(Gls)
2025–	Germany	16	(0)
Medal record
European Championship
Silver medal – second place	2026 Denmark/Norway/Sweden
- Updated on 8 November 2026

Tom Kiesler (born 24 April 2001) is a German handball player for VfL Gummersbach and the German national team.

== Career ==
Kiesler joined the professional squad of VfL Gummersbach in 2019, when the club was competing in the 2. Bundesliga. In 2022, they were promoted to the Bundesliga.

He made his international debut on the German national team on 30 October 2025. At the 2026 European Men's Handball Championship the team won silver, losing to Denmark in the final. In the final he was shown the red card after just 14 minutes after a tackle to the face on Mathias Gidsel.
