= Matthes Langhoff =

German handball player (born 2002)

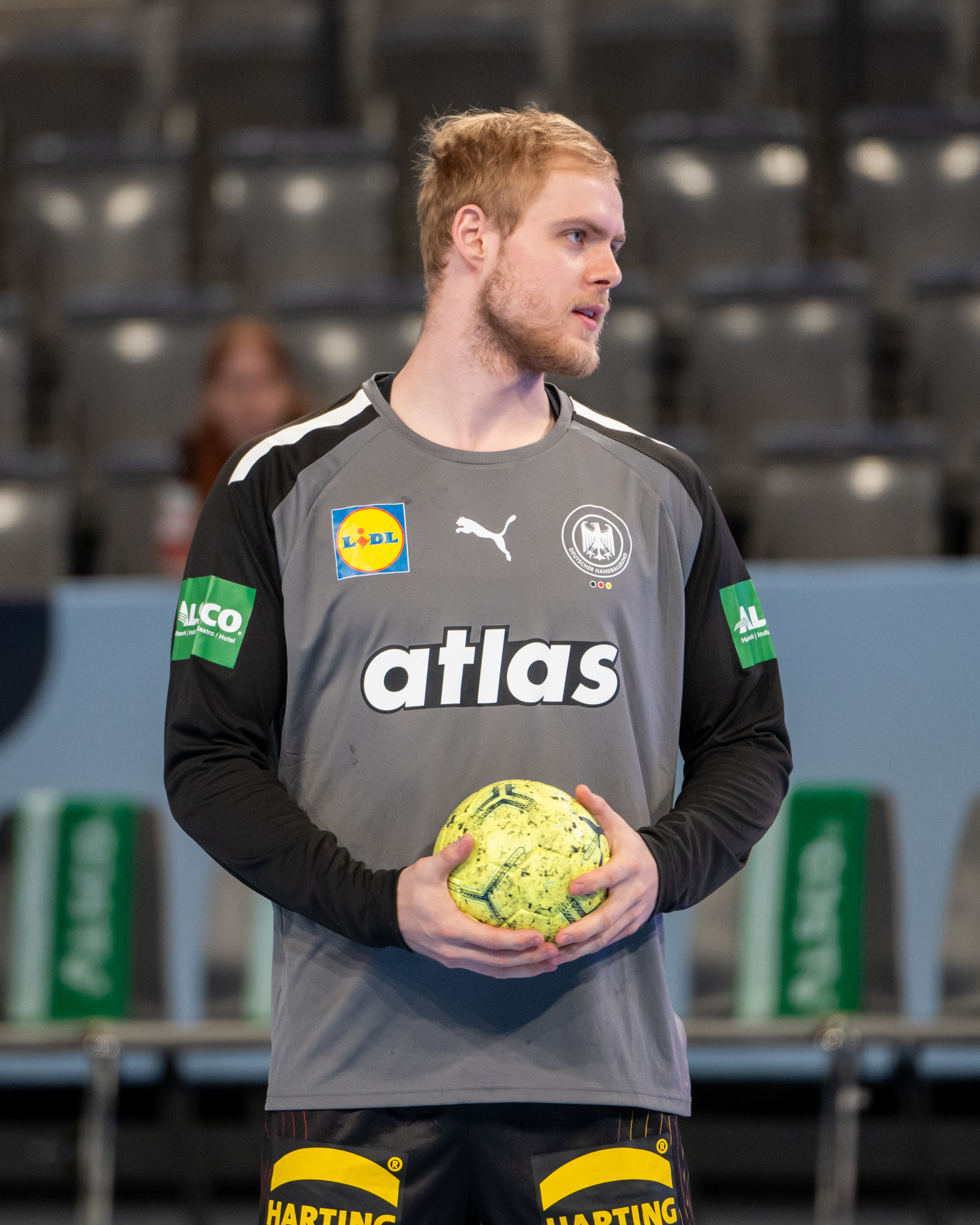
- Langhoff in 2025

Personal information
- Nationality: German
- Born: 30 March 2002 (age 24) Neubrandenburg, Germany
- Height: 1.92 m (6 ft 4 in)

Sport
- Sport: Handball
- Position: Left back
- Current club: Füchse Berlin
- Number: 25

Youth career
- Years: Team
- –: SV Fortuna ’50 Neubrandenburg
- –: Füchse Berlin

Senior clubs
- Years: Team
- –: Füchse Berlin
- 2022–2024: → 1. VfL Potsdam (loan)
National team
Years	Team	Apps	(Gls)
2025–	Germany	15	(6)
Medal record
European Championship
Silver medal – second place	2026 Denmark/Norway/Sweden
- Updated on 8 November 2026

Matthes Langhoff (born 30 March 2002) is a German handball player for Füchse Berlin.

== Career ==
Langhoff started playing handball at SV Fortuna ’50 Neubrandenburg in his hometown, and then he joined the youth team of Füchse Berlin.

With Füchse he won the 2022/23 EHF European League.

From 2022 to 2024 he played for 1. VfL Potsdam, which Füchse has a development agreement with. In 2024 he helped the team getting promoted to the Handball-Bundesliga.

When he returned to Füchse he won the 2024–25 Handball-Bundesliga, which was the first in club history. The same season, he played in the 2024–25 EHF Champions League final, where Füchse lost to league rivals SC Magdeburg.

== National team ==
With the German youth team he won the 2023 IHF Men's U21 Handball World Championship.

He made his debut for the German national team on 11 May 2025 against Turkey. His first major international tournament was the 2026 European Men's Handball Championship, where Germany won silver medals, losing to Denmark in the final.
