= THW Kiel =

German handball club

- Full name: Turnverein Hassee-Winterbek Kiel
- Nickname: The Zebras
- Founded: 1904; 122 years ago
- Arena: Wunderino Arena
- Capacity: 10,250
- President: Olaf Berner
- Head coach: Børge Lund
- League: Handball-Bundesliga
- 2025–26: 6th of 18
- Club colours
Home	Away

THW Kiel is a professional handball club from Kiel, Germany. The club competes in the Handball-Bundesliga and is the record champion with 23 titles. 2007 and 2012 were the most successful years in the club's history, as THW completed the treble, winning the domestic league, the domestic cup, and the EHF Champions League. In 2012, the team won every league game, a first in any top-flight German team sports. They ended the 2019–20 season as winners of the EHF Champions League and champions of the Handball-Bundesliga. Since then, they have secured additional league titles in 2021 and 2023, along with the DHB-Pokal in 2025. They have the nickname 'the zebras' and have a rivalry with fellow Schleswig-Holstein team SG Flensburg-Handewitt.

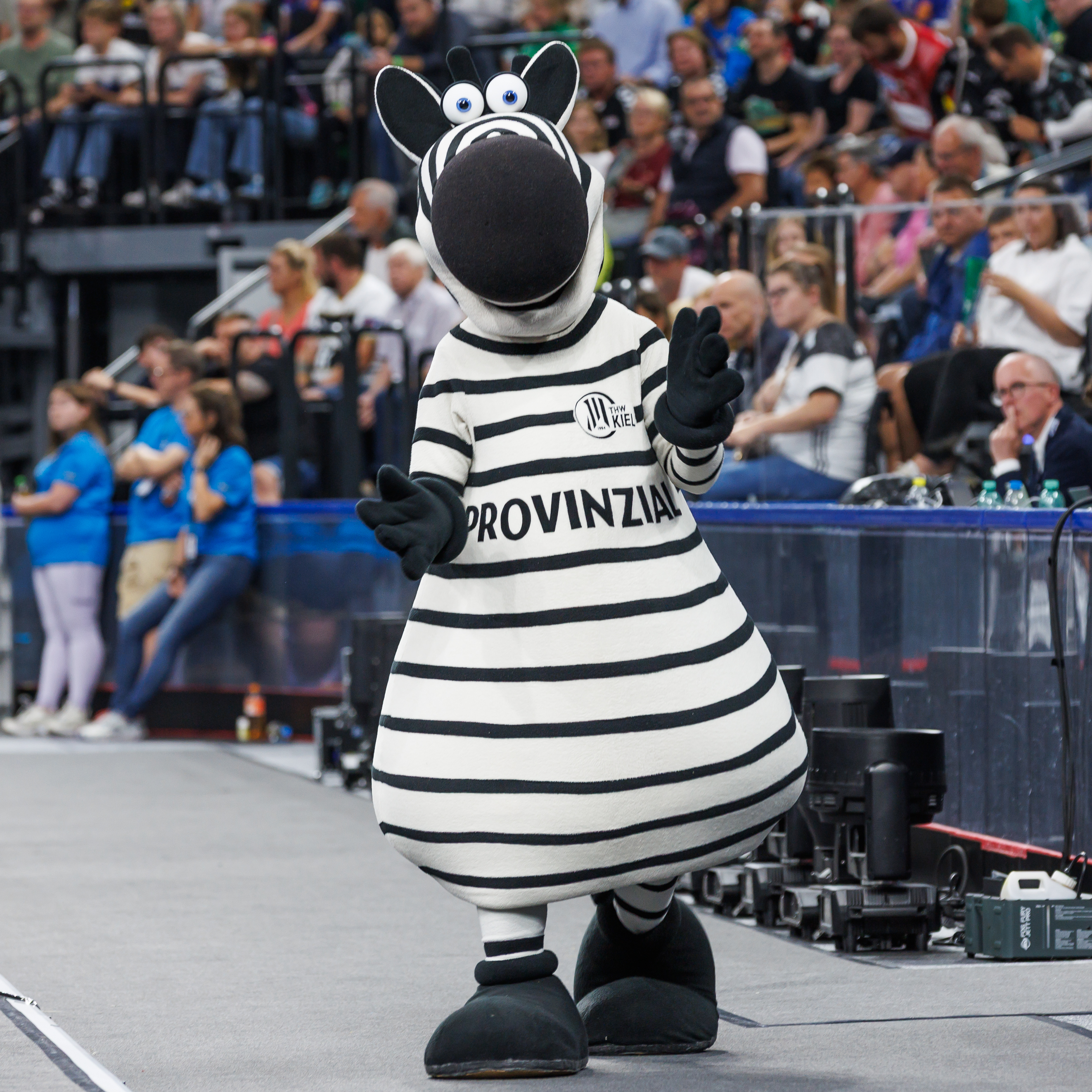
Hein Daddel – the official mascot of THW Kiel.

== History ==
The club was founded on 4 February 1904, as a gymnastics association. From the beginning it was only a men's club, but from 1907 women were included too. The handball department was founded in summer 1923, initially focusing on field handball before transitioning to indoor handball. The opening of the Ostseehalle in Kiel in 1951 provided a key venue for indoor handball, boosting the sport's popularity locally. THW Kiel achieved its first national indoor handball championship in 1957. In 1992, the professional handball team became an independent entity as THW Kiel Handball-Bundesliga GmbH & Co. KG.

== Crest, colours, supporters ==
=== Kits ===
HOME
2010–12	2013–14	2018–19	2019–20	2024-25	2025-

AWAY
2018–19	2020–21	2024-25	2025-

=== Rivalries ===
The main rival of THW Kiel is SG Flensburg-Handewitt. The derby between them is called the "Nordderby" and have regularly and closely fought for national championships and in finals of the DHB-Pokal. As of March 2025, 114 matches have been contested between the two sides, with THW winning 67 and SG with 42 victories.

== Accomplishments ==
- Handball-Bundesliga: 23
  - Gold: 1957, 1962, 1963, 1994, 1995, 1996, 1998, 1999, 2000, 2002, 2005, 2006, 2007, 2008, 2009, 2010, 2012, 2013, 2014, 2015, 2020, 2021, 2023
  - Silver: 1953, 1956, 1960, 1964, 1983, 1985, 1989, 2004, 2011, 2019, 2022
- DHB-Pokal: 13
  - Gold: 1998, 1999, 2000, 2007, 2008, 2009, 2011, 2012, 2013, 2017, 2019, 2022, 2025
  - Silver: 1979, 1990, 2005
- DHB-Supercup: 13
  - Gold: 1995, 1998, 2005, 2007, 2008, 2011, 2012, 2014, 2015, 2020, 2021, 2022, 2023
  - Silver: 1994, 1996, 1999, 2000, 2002, 2006, 2009, 2010, 2013, 2017, 2019, 2025
- EHF Champions League: 4
  - Gold: 2007, 2010, 2012, 2020
  - Silver: 2000, 2008, 2009, 2014
  - Bronze: 2022, 2024
- EHF Cup / EHF European League: 4
  - Gold: 1998, 2002, 2004, 2019
  - Silver: 2026
  - Bronze: 2025
- EHF Men's Champions Trophy: 1
  - Gold: 2007
  - Silver: 2004
  - Bronze: 2001, 2008
- IHF Men's Super Globe: 1
  - Gold: 2011
  - Silver: 2012, 2019
- German Championship: 2 (Field handball)
  - Gold: 1948, 1950
  - Silver: 1951, 1953
- Double: 8
  - 1997–98, 1998–99, 1999–00, 2006–07, 2007–08, 2008–09, 2011–12, 2012–13
- Triple Crown: 2
  - 2006–07, 2011–12

== Team ==
=== Current squad ===
Squad for the 2026–27 season

Goalkeepers

- 1 (Spain) Gonzalo Pérez de Vargas
- 33 (Germany) Andreas Wolff
- 36 (Germany) Tobias Dengler

Left wingers

- 23 (Germany) Rune Dahmke
- 74 (Germany) Vincent Büchner

Right wingers

- 3 (Germany) Jarnes Faust
- 24 (Germany) Lukas Zerbe

Line players

- 20 (Switzerland) Lukas Laube
- 61 (Germany) Hendrik Pekeler
- 93 (Croatia) Veron Načinović

Left backs

- 7 (Germany) Julian Köster
- 21 (Sweden) Eric Johansson

Central backs

- 4 (Croatia) Domagoj Duvnjak (c)
- 22 (Germany) Rasmus Ankermann
- 35 (Slovenia) Domen Makuc
- 71 (Faroe Islands) Elias Ellefsen á Skipagøtu

Right backs

- 6 (Norway) Harald Reinkind
- 11 (Denmark) Emil Madsen

=== Transfers ===
Transfers for the 2027–28 season

Joining

- (Germany) Justus Fischer (LP) (from (Germany) TSV Hannover-Burgdorf)

Leaving

- (Faroe Islands) Elias Ellefsen á Skipagøtu (CB) (to (Denmark) Aalborg Håndbold)

=== Transfer History ===
Transfers for the 2026–27 season

Joining

- (Slovenia) Domen Makuc (CB) from (Spain) FC Barcelona
- (Germany) Julian Köster (LB) from (Germany) VfL Gummersbach
- (Germany) Jarnes Faust (RW) from (Germany) TBV Lemgo Lippe
- (Germany) Vincent Büchner (LW) from (Germany) ThSV Eisenach
- (Germany) Leon Nowottny (GK) back from loan at (Germany) TV Großwallstadt

Leaving

- (Denmark) Magnus Landin Jacobsen (LW) to (Denmark) Aalborg Håndbold
- (Austria) Nikola Bilyk (LB) to (Switzerland) HC Kriens-Luzern
- (Hungary) Bence Imre (RW) to (Hungary) ONE Veszprém
- (Norway) Petter Øverby (LP) to (Germany) HSG Wetzlar
- (Egypt) Mohab Abdelhak (RB) to (North Macedonia) RK Vardar
- (Germany) Leon Nowottny (GK) to (Germany) HSV Hamburg
- (Germany) Johan Rohwer (LB) on loan at (Germany) TV Großwallstadt

Transfers for the 2025–26 season

Joining

- (Spain) Gonzalo Pérez de Vargas (GK) from (Spain) FC Barcelona
- (Switzerland) Lukas Laube (LP) from (Germany) TVB Stuttgart
- (Croatia) Veron Načinović (LP) (from (France) Montpellier Handball
- (Egypt) Mohab Abdelhak (RB) from (France) USAM Nîmes Gard

Leaving

- (Czech Republic) Tomáš Mrkva (GK) to (Germany) SC DHfK Leipzig
- (Germany) Patrick Wiencek (LP) (retires)
- (Germany) Henri Pabst (RB) to (Germany) TuS N-Lübbecke
- (Germany) Linus Kutz (CB) to (Germany) VfL Eintracht Hagen
- (Germany) Leon Nowottny (GK) on loan at (Germany) TV Großwallstadt

=== Staff ===
Staff for the 2026–27 season

Pos.	Name
Managing director	(Austria) Viktor Szilágyi
Head coach	(Norway) Børge Lund
Assistant coach	(Germany) Christian Sprenger
Goalkeeping coach	(Sweden) Mattias Andersson
Team physician	Dr. Detlev Brandecker
Team physician	Dr. Frank Pries
Team leader	Michael Menzel
Physiotherapist	Maik Bolte
Physiotherapist	Stephan Lienau
Physiotherapist	Jan Bock

=== Notable former players ===
- (Germany) Heinrich Dahlinger (1936–1966)
- (Germany) Michael Krieter (1983–1998)
- (Germany) Wolfgang Schwenke (1996–2001)
- (Germany) Uwe Schwenker (1980–1992)
- (Germany) Henning Fritz (2001–2007)
- (Germany) Dominik Klein (2006–2016)
- (Germany) Thomas Knorr (1992–1998)
- (Germany) Tobias Reichmann (2009–2012)
- (Germany) Christian Sprenger (2009–2017)
- (Germany) Christian Zeitz (2003–2014, 2016–2018)
- (Germany) Andreas Wolff (2016–2019)
- (Germany) Christian Dissinger (2015–2018)
- (Germany) Dario Quenstedt (2019–2022)
- (Sweden) Stefan Lövgren (1999–2009)
- (Sweden) Staffan Olsson (1996–2003)
- (Sweden) Magnus Wislander (1990–2002)
- (Sweden) Johan Petersson (2001–2005)
- (Sweden) Kim Andersson (2005–2012)
- (Sweden) Marcus Ahlm (2003–2013)
- (Sweden) Peter Gentzel (2009–2010)
- (Sweden) Henrik Lundström (2004–2012)
- (Sweden) Martin Boquist (2003–2005)
- (Sweden) Mattias Andersson (2001–2008)
- (Sweden) Pelle Linders (2005–2007)
- (Sweden) Andreas Palicka (2008–2015)
- (Sweden) Lukas Nilsson (2016–2020)
- (Denmark) Nikolaj Jacobsen (1998–2004)
- (Denmark) Rasmus Lauge (2013–2015)
- (Denmark) René Toft Hansen (2012–2018)
- (Denmark) Lars Krogh Jeppesen (2006–2007)
- (Denmark) Morten Bjerre (2000–2003)
- (Denmark) Niklas Landin Jacobsen (2015–2023)
- (Denmark) Magnus Landin Jacobsen (2018–2026)
- (Austria) Nikola Bilyk (2016–2026)
- (France) Nikola Karabatić (2005–2009)
- (France) Daniel Narcisse (2009–2013)
- (France) Thierry Omeyer (2006–2013)
- (France) Jérôme Fernandez (2010–2011)
- (France) Igor Anić (2015–2016)
- (France) Vincent Gérard (2023–2024)
- (Norway) Børge Lund (2007–2010)
- (Norway) Frode Hagen (2004–2006)
- (Norway) Steinar Ege (1999–2002, 2015)
- (Norway) Sander Sagosen (2020–2023)
- (Serbia) Goran Stojanović (1996–1999)
- (Serbia) Ljubomir Pavlović (2003)
- (Serbia) Momir Ilić (2009–2013)
- (Serbia) Marko Vujin (2012–2019)
- (Croatia) Davor Dominiković (2002–2003)
- (Croatia) Ilija Brozović (2016–2017)
- (Croatia) Blaženko Lacković (2016–2017)
- (Poland) Marek Panas (1982–1989)
- (Poland) Daniel Waszkiewicz (1987–1990)
- (Poland) Piotr Przybecki (2001–2004)
- (Socialist Federal Republic of Yugoslavia) Predrag Timko (1977–1980)
- (Socialist Federal Republic of Yugoslavia) Nenad Peruničić (1997–2001)
- (Socialist Federal Republic of Yugoslavia) Goran Stojanović (1996–1999)
- (Iceland) Guðjón Valur Sigurðsson (2012–2014)
- (Iceland) Aron Pálmarsson (2009–2015)
- (Czech Republic) Filip Jícha (2007–2015)
- (Czech Republic) Pavel Horák (2019–2022)
- (Slovenia) Vid Kavtičnik (2005–2009)
- (Slovenia) Miha Zarabec (2017–2023)
- (Spain) Demetrio Lozano (2001–2004)
- (Spain) Joan Cañellas (2014–2016)
- (Tunisia) Wael Jallouz (2013–2014)
- (Germany) (Croatia) Zvonimir Serdarušić (1980–1981)
- (Ukraine) (Spain) Andrei Xepkin (2007)
- (Cuba) (Spain) Julio Fis (2001–2002)

=== Notable former coaches ===
- (Germany) Fritz Westheider (1930–1958)
- (Germany) Heinrich Dahlinger (1958–1972)
- (Germany) Kurt Bartels, (Germany) Rolf Krabbenhöft, (Germany) Bernd Struck (1972–1973)
- (Germany) Adolf Gabriel (1973–1975)
- (Germany) Werner Kirst (1975)
- (Germany) Gerd Welz (1975–1977)
- (Socialist Federal Republic of Yugoslavia) Željko Seleš (1977–1978)
- (Germany) Werner Kirst (1978–1979)
- (Germany) Gerd Welz (1979–1980)
- (Socialist Federal Republic of Yugoslavia) Marinko Andrić (1980–1981)
- (Germany) Herward Wieck (1981–1982)
- (Iceland) Jóhann Ingi Gunnarsson (1983–1986)
- (Poland) Marek Panas (1987–1989)
- (Croatia) Josip Milković (1989)
- (Germany) Holger Oertel (1989–1992)
- (Germany) Uwe Schwenker (1993)
- (Germany) (Croatia) Zvonimir Serdarušić (1993–2008)
- (Iceland) Alfreð Gíslason (2008–2019)
- (Czech Republic) Filip Jícha (2019–2026)
