= Jannik Kohlbacher =

German handball player (born 1995)

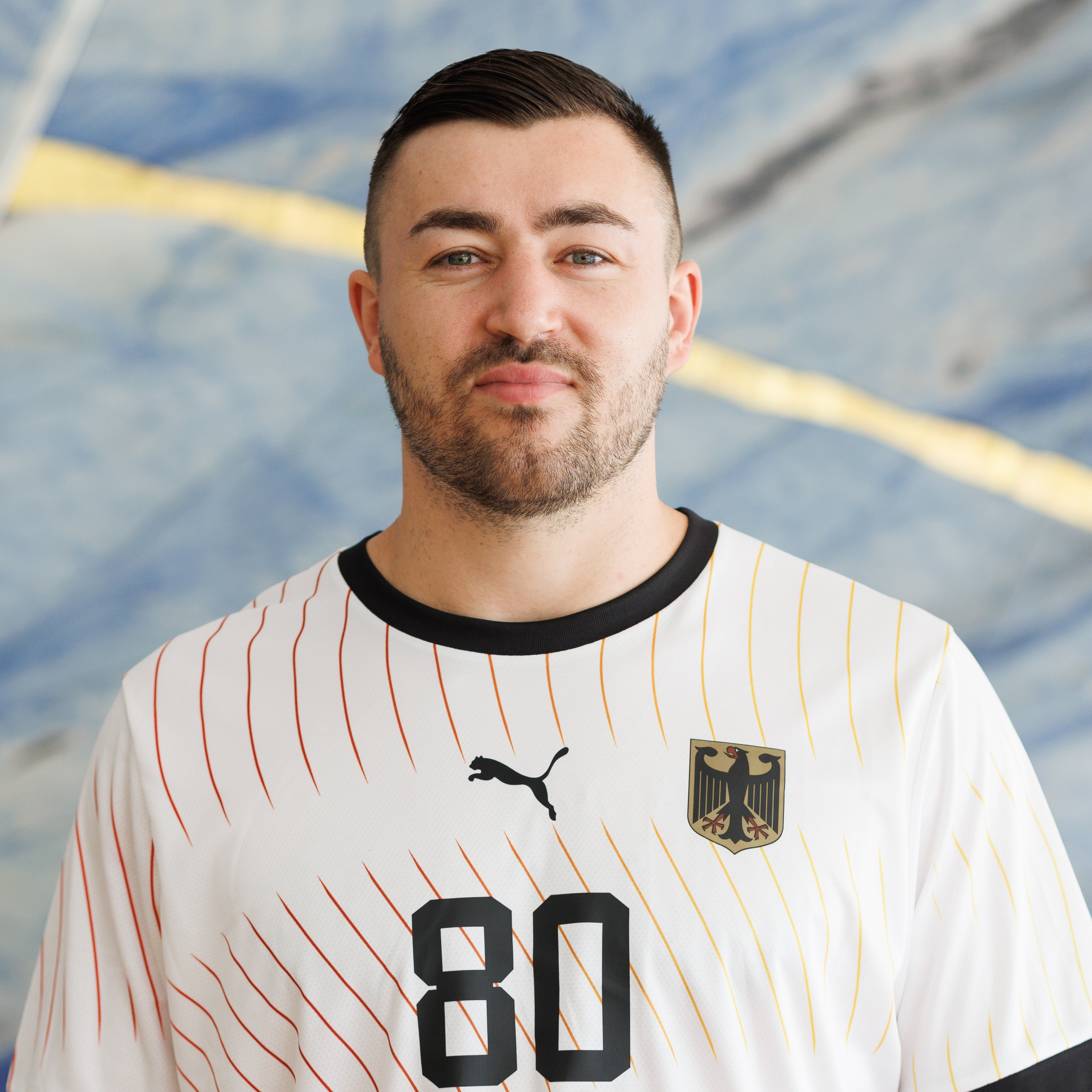
- Kohlbacher in 2024

Personal information
- Nationality: German
- Born: 19 July 1995 (age 31) Bensheim, Germany
- Height: 1.93 m (6 ft 4 in)

Sport
- Sport: Handball
- Position: Pivot
- Current club: Rhein-Neckar Löwen
- Number: 80

Youth career
- Years: Team
- –2012: TV Grosswallstadt

Senior clubs
- Years: Team
- 2012–2013: SG Leutershausen
- 2013–2015: TV Grosswallstadt
- 2015–2018: HSG Wetzlar
- 2018–: Rhein-Neckar Löwen
National team
Years	Team	Apps	(Gls)
2015–	Germany	137	(242)
Medal record
Olympic Games
Silver medal – second place	2024 Paris	Team
European Championship
Gold medal – first place	2016 Poland
Silver medal – second place	2026 Denmark/Norway/Sweden
Youth World Championship
Bronze medal – third place	2013 Hungary
Youth European Championship
Gold medal – first place	2012 Austria
- Updated on 8 November 2026

Jannik Kohlbacher (born 19 July 1995) is a German handball player for Rhein-Neckar Löwen and the Germany national team.

== Early life and career ==
In November 2015, he was called up to the Germany national team for the Supercup tournament against, Brazil, Slovenia and Serbia. He debuted for the national team on the 5th of November against Brazil. He was part of the German team that won the 2016 European Men's Handball Championship.

At the 2026 European Men's Handball Championship he won silver medals, losing to Denmark in the final. Kohlbacher received a red card in the final in the 56th minute.
