= Germany men's national handball team =

Handball team of Germany

Germany

Information
- Association: Deutscher Handballbund
- Coach: Alfreð Gíslason
- Assistant coach: Mattias Andersson; Erik Wudtke
- Most caps: Frank-Michael Wahl (344)
- Most goals: Frank-Michael Wahl (1412)

Colours
1st	2nd

Results

Summer Olympics
- Appearances: 12 (First in 1936)
- Best result: (gold) 1st (1936)

World Championship
- Appearances: 27 (First in 1938)
- Best result: (gold) 1st (1938, 1978, 2007)

European Championship
- Appearances: 15 (First in 1994)
- Best result: (gold) 1st (2004, 2016)
- Last updated on Unknown.

Germany men's national handball team
Medal record

Olympic Games
Gold medal – first place	1936 Berlin	Team
Silver medal – second place	1984 Los Angeles	Team
Silver medal – second place	2004 Athens	Team
Silver medal – second place	2024 Paris	Team
Bronze medal – third place	2016 Rio de Janeiro	Team

World Championship
Gold medal – first place	1938 Germany	
Gold medal – first place	1978 Denmark	
Gold medal – first place	2007 Germany	
Silver medal – second place	1954 Sweden	
Silver medal – second place	2003 Portugal	
Bronze medal – third place	1958 East Germany	

European Championship
Gold medal – first place	2004 Slovenia	
Gold medal – first place	2016 Poland	
Silver medal – second place	2002 Sweden	
Silver medal – second place	2026 Denmark/Norway/Sweden	
Bronze medal – third place	1998 Italy	

World Outdoor Championship
Gold medal – first place	1938 Germany	
Gold medal – first place	1952 Switzerland	
Gold medal – first place	1955 West Germany	
Gold medal – first place	1959 Austria	
Gold medal – first place	1966 Austria	
Silver medal – second place	1963 Switzerland	

The Germany national handball team is the country's national men's handball team and represents Germany in international tournaments in men's handball and is one of the most successful handball teams in the world, having won three World Championships and two European Championship.

== Honours ==
Competition	1st place, gold medalist(s)	2nd place, silver medalist(s)	3rd place, bronze medalist(s)	Total
Olympic Games	1	3	1	5
World Championship	3	2	1	6
European Championship	2	2	1	5
Total	6	7	3	16

== Competitive record ==
For East Germany team record, look here.

=== Olympic Games ===
Year	Round	Position	GP	W	D*	L	GS	GA
(Germany) 1936	Champions	1	5	5	0	0	96	19
(West Germany) 1972	Main round	6	6	2	1	3	87	93
(Canada) 1976	Semi-finals	4	6	4	0	2	115	97
(Soviet Union) 1980	Did not qualify							
(United States) 1984	Runners-up	2	6	5	0	1	131	113
(South Korea) 1988	Did not qualify							
(Spain) 1992	Preliminary round	10	6	1	1	4	116	123
(United States) 1996	Preliminary round	7	6	4	0	2	144	128
(Australia) 2000	Knockout stage	5	8	5	1	2	203	180
(Greece) 2004	Runners-up	2	8	5	0	3	216	181
(China) 2008	Preliminary round	9	5	2	1	2	126	130
(United Kingdom) 2012	Did not qualify							
(Brazil) 2016	Third place	3	8	6	0	2	246	217
(Japan) 2020	Quarterfinals	6	6	3	0	3	172	162
(France) 2024 Paris	Runners-up	2	8	5	1	2	248	228
(United States) 2028 Los Angeles	TBD							
(Australia) 2032 Brisbane	TBD							
Total	12/15	1 Title	78	47	5*	26	1800	1671

=== World Championship ===
Year	Round	Position	GP	W	D*	L	GS	GA
(Nazi Germany) 1938	Champions	1	3	3	0	0	23	9
(Sweden) 1954	Runners-up	2	3	2	0	1	61	30
(East Germany) 1958	Third place	3	6	5	0	1	149	70
(West Germany) 1961	Fourth place	4	6	4	0	2	107	64
(Czechoslovakia) 1964	Fourth place	4	6	3	1	2	96	86
(Sweden) 1967	Quarter-finals	6	6	4	0	2	158	139
(France) 1970	Quarter-finals	5	6	5	0	1	88	81
(East Germany) 1974	Preliminary Round	9	6	4	0	2	116	100
(Denmark) 1978	Champions	1	6	4	2	0	105	86
(West Germany) 1982	Main Round	7	7	4	1	2	128	119
(Switzerland) 1986	Main Round	7	7	4	0	3	134	135
(Czechoslovakia) 1990	Did not qualify							
(Sweden) 1993	Main Group	6	7	3	2	2	154	154
(Iceland) 1995	Fourth place	4	9	7	0	2	221	184
(Japan) 1997	Did not qualify							
(Egypt) 1999	Quarter-finals	5	9	8	0	1	244	182
(France) 2001	Quarter-finals	8	9	4	1	4	259	213
(Portugal) 2003	Runners-up	2	9	7	1	1	306	219
(Tunisia) 2005	Main Round	9	9	5	1	3	269	232
(Germany) 2007	Champions	1	10	9	0	1	304	260
(Croatia) 2009	Main Round	5	9	5	2	2	259	228
(Sweden) 2011	Main Round	11	9	5	0	4	268	246
(Spain) 2013	Quarter-finals	5	7	5	0	2	200	177
(Qatar) 2015	Quarter-finals	7	9	6	1	2	250	221
(France) 2017	Round of 16	9	6	5	0	1	179	128
(Denmark) / (Germany) 2019	Fourth place	4	10	6	2	2	269	237
(Egypt) 2021	Main Round	12	6	3	1	2	163	122
(Poland) (Sweden) 2023	Quarter-finals	5	9	7	0	2	291	247
(Croatia) (Denmark) (Norway) 2025	Quarter-finals	6	7	5	0	2	220	196
(Germany) 2027	Qualified as host							
(France) (Germany) 2029	Qualified as co-host							
(Denmark) (Iceland) (Norway) 2031	TBD							
Total	29/32	3 Titles	196	132	15*	49	5021	4165

=== Euro Tournaments ===
All teams in these tournaments are European, all World and Olympic Champions, and top 7 from World Championships and Olympics were participating. They were mini European championships at the time, till 1994 when official European Championship started.

EURO World Cup tournament Sweden

- 1979 (Sweden) : 6th place
- 1984 (Sweden) : 8th place
- 1988 (Sweden) : Champions

EURO Super Cup tournament Germany

- 1979 (Germany) : Champions
- 1981 (Germany) : Runner Up
- 1983 (Germany) : 6th place
- 1985 (Germany) : Third
- 1987 (Germany) : Champions
- 1989 (Germany) : 6th place
- 1991 (Germany) : 4th place
- 1993 (Germany) : Runner Up

=== European Championship ===
Year	Round	Position	GP	W	D	L	GS	GA
(Portugal) 1994	9th/10th place	9	6	2	1	3	135	131
(Spain) 1996	7th/8th place	8	6	1	1	4	131	135
(Italy) 1998	Third place	3	7	5	0	2	177	159
(Croatia) 2000	9th/10th place	9	6	1	2	3	129	136
(Sweden) 2002	Runners-up	2	8	5	1	2	201	188
(Slovenia) 2004	Champions	1	8	6	1	1	244	208
(Switzerland) 2006	5th/6th place	5	7	5	1	1	223	193
(Norway) 2008	Fourth place	4	8	4	0	4	224	224
(Austria) 2010	Main round	10	6	1	2	3	157	165
(Serbia) 2012	Main round	7	6	2	1	3	156	156
(Denmark) 2014	Did not qualify							
(Poland) 2016	Champions	1	8	7	0	1	223	200
(Croatia) 2018	Main round	9	6	2	2	2	156	145
(Austria) (Norway) (Sweden) 2020	5th/6th place	5	8	6	0	2	232	202
(Hungary) (Slovakia) 2022	Main round	7	7	4	0	3	194	192
(Germany) 2024	Fourth place	4	9	4	1	4	255	239
(Denmark) (Norway) (Sweden) 2026	Runners–ups	2	9	6	0	3	275	274
(Portugal) (Spain) (Switzerland) 2028	TBD							
(Czech Republic) (Denmark) (Poland) 2030	TBD							
(France) (Germany) 2032	Qualified as co-host							
Total	16/18	2 titles	115	61	13	41	3112	2947

*Denotes draws include knockout matches decided in a penalty shootout.
**Gold background color indicates that the tournament was won. Red border color indicates tournament was held on home soil.

== Team ==
=== Current squad ===
Roster for the 2026 European Men's Handball Championship.

Head coach: Alfreð Gíslason

No.	Pos.	Name	Date of birth (age)	Height	App.	Goals	Club
1	GK	David Späth	29 April 2002 (age 24)	2.00 m	46	3	(Germany) Rhein-Neckar Löwen
3	CB	Nils Lichtlein	31 July 2002 (age 24)	1.83 m	31	35	(Germany) Füchse Berlin
4	P	Johannes Golla (c)	5 November 1997 (age 28)	1.95 m	108	377	(Germany) SG Flensburg-Handewitt
5	LB	Miro Schluroff	25 April 2000 (age 26)	1.98 m	8	20	(Germany) VfL Gummersbach
13	LB	Matthes Langhoff	30 March 2002 (age 24)	1.93 m	3	2	(Germany) Füchse Berlin
14	RW	Mathis Häseler	25 June 2002 (age 24)	1.90 m	6	12	(Germany) VfL Gummersbach
15	CB	Juri Knorr	9 May 2000 (age 26)	1.94 m	83	319	(Denmark) Aalborg Håndbold
17	RW	Lukas Zerbe	17 January 1996 (age 30)	1.84 m	47	105	(Germany) THW Kiel
18	LB	Julian Köster	16 March 2000 (age 26)	2.03 m	75	198	(Germany) VfL Gummersbach
23	RB	Renārs Uščins	29 April 2002 (age 24)	1.89 m	45	182	(Germany) TSV Hannover-Burgdorf
30	CB	Tom Kiesler	24 April 2001 (age 25)	1.93 m	4	0	(Germany) VfL Gummersbach
32	RB	Franz Semper	5 July 1997 (age 29)	1.91 m	30	61	(Germany) SC DHfK Leipzig
33	GK	Andreas Wolff	3 March 1991 (age 35)	1.98 m	187	16	(Germany) THW Kiel
34	LW	Rune Dahmke	10 April 1993 (age 33)	1.89 m	96	137	(Germany) THW Kiel
36	LW	Lukas Mertens	22 March 1996 (age 30)	1.82 m	70	158	(Germany) SC Magdeburg
54	P	Justus Fischer	6 February 2003 (age 23)	1.93 m	34	42	(Germany) TSV Hannover-Burgdorf
71	LB	Marko Grgic	11 September 2003 (age 22)	1.98 m	31	91	(Germany) SG Flensburg-Handewitt
80	P	Jannik Kohlbacher	19 July 1995 (age 31)	1.90 m	127	239	(Germany) Rhein-Neckar Löwen

=== History of coaches ===
- 1925–1933 – Carl Schelenz
- 1934–1939 – Otto Günther Kaundinya
- 1940–1945 – Carl Schelenz
- 1946–1955 – Fritz Fromm
- 1955–1972 – Werner Vick
- 1972–1974 – Horst Käsler
- 1974–1982 – Vlado Stenzel
- 1982–1987 – Simon Schobel
- 1987–1989 – Petre Ivănescu
- 1989–1992 – Horst Bredemeier
- 1992–1993 – Armin Emrich
- 1993–1996 – Arno Ehret
- 1997–2011 – Heiner Brand
- 2011–2014 – Martin Heuberger
- 2014–2017 – Dagur Sigurðsson
- 2017–2020 – Christian Prokop
- 2020–present – Alfreð Gíslason
