= VfL Gummersbach =

German handball club

- Full name: Verein für Leibesübung von 1861 e. V.
- Founded: March 3, 1861; 165 years ago
- Arena: Schwalbe-Arena
- Capacity: 4,132
- President: Dieter Brüning
- Head coach: Guðjón Valur Sigurðsson
- League: Handball-Bundesliga
- 2025–26: 4th of 18
- Club colours
Home	Away

VfL Gummersbach is a professional handball club from the German city of Gummersbach, North Rhine-Westphalia. Currently, VfL Gummersbach competes in the Handball-Bundesliga and the DHB-Pokal. The club has seen great success, especially from the late 1960s until the early 1990s.

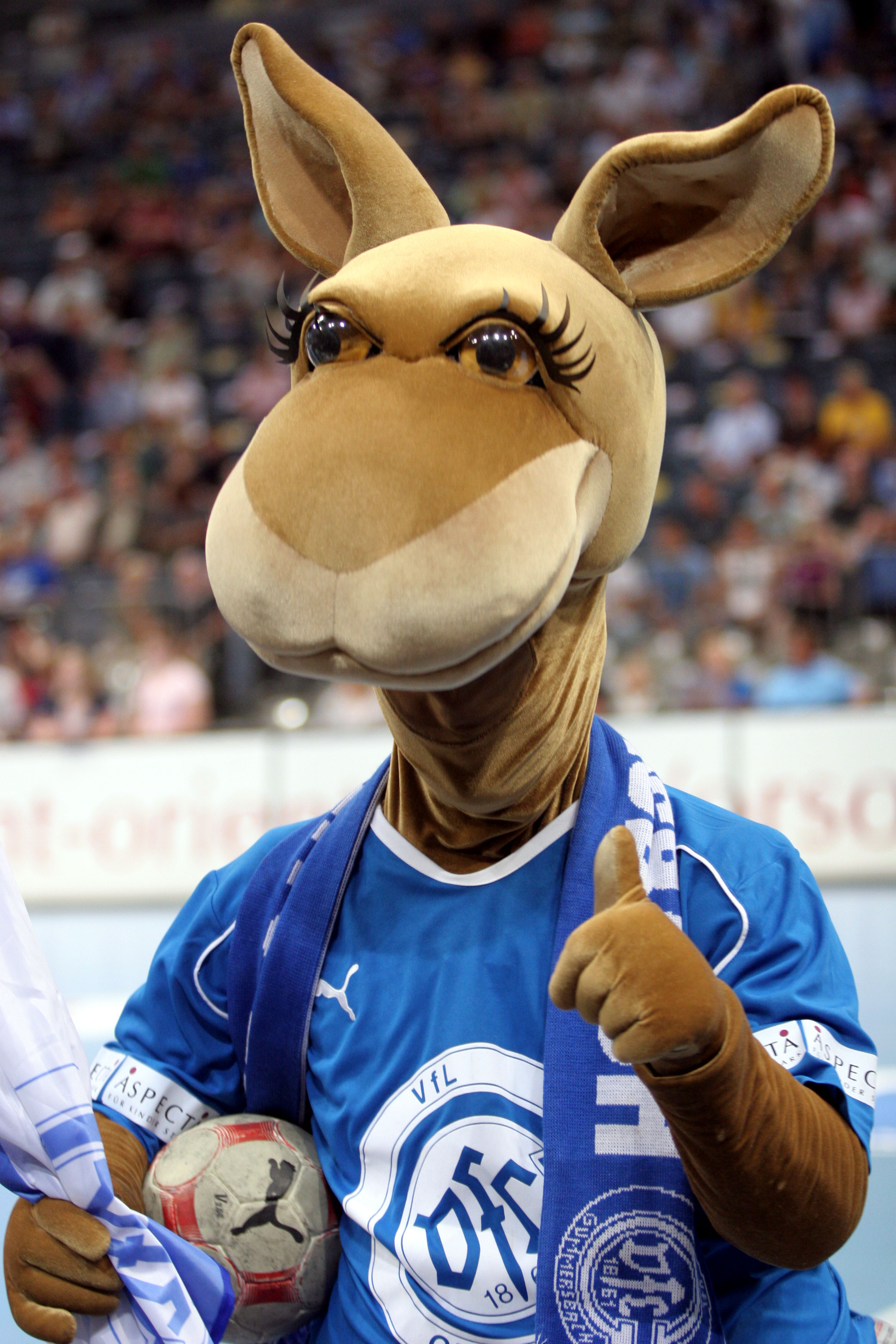
Gummi – the official mascot of VfL Gummersbach.

== History ==
=== Founding and early history ===
The club was founded as a multisports club on March 3, 1861, as Gummersbacher Turnverein(GTV). The youth department was founded in 1884, and in 1906 women were included as members.

The handball department was founded in 1925. While field handball was the most popular variant in Germany at the time, Gummersbach focused on indoor handball.

In April 1937 they fused with another local team SSV Gummersbach, and afterwards they became known as VfL Gummersbach von 1861.

=== Success years in the 70s and 80s ===
In 1966 the club won the German Championship for the first time. In 1970 the club won the European Cup, beating SC Dynamo Berlin in the final. During the 1970s the club won four more German championships, as well as 2 German cups and five European Cups.

During the 1980s Gummersbach remained one of the strongest teams in West Germany behind TUSEM Essen and TV Großwallstadt. They also won the first edition of the IHF Cup in 1982.

=== Later years ===
In 2004-05 they qualified for a European tournament again, the EHF Cup after 13 years absence. They reached the semifinal were they lost to SC Magdeburg. In the 2006-07 season they played in the EHF Champions League again, where they reached the quarter finals. In 2008-09 they won their first international title in 26 years, when they beat RK Velenje in the final of the 2008-09 EHF Cup.

In the 2011-12 the team lost their Bundesliga license due to a 2 million euro dificit in their budget. Fans and sponsors went together to close the gap and appealed the license revocation, meaning that the club could continue playing at the top level, subject to strict conditions from the league.

== Crest, colours, supporters ==
=== Kits ===
HOME
Select
2014–16

AWAY
Select
2014–16

== Accomplishments ==
- 1. Handball-Bundesliga: 12
  - Gold: 1966, 1967, 1969, 1973, 1974, 1975, 1976, 1982, 1983, 1985, 1988, 1991
- 2. Handball-Bundesliga:
  - Gold: 2022
- DHB-Pokal:
  - Gold: 1977, 1978, 1982, 1983, 1985
- EHF Champions League:
  - Gold: 1967, 1970, 1971, 1974, 1983
  - Silver: 1972
- EHF Cup Winners' Cup:
  - Gold: 1978, 1979, 2010, 2011
- EHF Cup:
  - Gold: 1982, 2009
- European Club Championship:
  - Gold: 1979, 1983
  - Silver: 2006
- Double

Winners: 1981–82, 1982–83, 1984–85

== Team ==
=== Current squad ===
Squad for the 2026–2027 season

Goalkeepers

- 16 (Denmark) Bertram Obling
- (Spain) Ignacio Biosca

Left Wingers

- 5 (Slovenia) Tilen Kodrin
- 6 (Montenegro) Miloš Vujović

Right Wingers

- 8 (Germany) Lukas Blohme
- 11 (Germany) Mathis Häseler

Line players

- 4 (Iceland) Elliði Snær Viðarsson
- 27 (Slovenia) Kristjan Horžen
- 66 (Czech Republic) Štěpán Zeman

Left Backs

- 15 (Germany) Miro Schluroff
- 30 (Germany) Tom Kiesler
- (Sweden) Nikola Roganović

Central Backs

- 20 (Sweden) Ludvig Hallbäck
- (Iceland) Garðar Ingi Sindrason

Right Backs

- 14 (Iceland) Teitur Örn Einarsson
- 31 (Netherlands) Kay Smits
- (Spain) Alex Dujshebaev

=== Transfers ===
Transfers for the 2026–27 season

Joining

- (Spain) Alex Dujshebaev (RB) from (Poland) Industria Kielce
- (Spain) Ignacio Biosca (GK) from (France) HBC Nantes
- (Sweden) Nikola Roganović (LB) from (Sweden) HK Malmö
- (Iceland) Garðar Ingi Sindrason (CB) from (Iceland) FH

Leaving

- (France) Kentin Mahé (CB) to (Germany) Rhein-Neckar Löwen
- (Croatia) Dominik Kuzmanović (GK) to (Germany) SC Magdeburg
- (Germany) Julian Köster (LB) to (Germany) THW Kiel

=== Transfer History ===
Transfers for the 2025–26 season

Joining

- (Netherlands) Kay Smits (RB) from (Germany) SG Flensburg-Handewitt
- (Portugal) João Gomes (RB) from (Portugal) Sporting CP

Leaving

- (Georgia (country)) Giorgi Tskhovrebadze (RB) to (Croatia) RK Zagreb
- (Portugal) João Gomes (RB) on loan at (Portugal) FC Porto

=== Notable players ===
- (Germany) Heiner Brand
- (Germany) Stefan Kretzschmar
- (Germany) Erhard Wunderlich
- (Germany) Andreas Dörhöfer
- (Germany) Mark Dragunski
- (Germany) Frank von Behren
- (Germany) Patrick Wiencek
- (Germany) Christian Ramota
- (Germany) Adrian Pfahl
- (Germany) Klaus-Dieter Petersen
- (Germany) Jochen Brand
- (Germany) Klaus Brand
- (Germany) Frank Dammann
- (Germany) Joachim Deckarm
- (Germany) Jochen Feldhoff
- (Germany) Frank Dammann
- (Germany) Claus Fey
- (Germany) Rudi Rauer
- (Germany) Henning Wiechers
- (Germany) Klaus Westebbe
- (Germany) Andreas Thiel
- (Germany) Dirk Rauin
- (Germany) Gerd Rosendahl
- (Germany) Franz-Josef Salewski
- (Germany) Klaus Schlagheck
- (Germany) Hansi Schmidt
- (Germany) Christian Fitzek
- (Germany) Stefan Hecker
- (Germany) Holger Löhr
- (Germany) Thomas Krokowski
- (Germany) Helmut Kosmehl
- (Germany) Rüdiger Neitzel
- (Germany) Gunnar Jaeger
- (Germany) Rolf Jaeger
- (Germany) Klaus Kater
- (France) Daniel Narcisse
- (France) Igor Anić
- (France) Kentin Mahé
- (France) François-Xavier Houlet
- (Serbia) Vladan Krasavac
- (Serbia) Aleksandar Stanojević
- (Serbia) Momir Ilić
- (Croatia) Vjenceslav Somić
- (Croatia) Drago Vuković
- (Iceland) Kristján Arason
- (Iceland) Guðjón Valur Sigurðsson
- (Denmark) Erik Veje Rasmussen
- (South Korea) Kyung-Shin Yoon
- (Montenegro) Goran Stojanović
- (North Macedonia) Borko Ristovski
- (Slovenia) Aljoša Rezar
- (Norway) Rune Erland
- (Hungary) Nándor Fazekas
- (Austria) (Hungary) Viktor Szilágyi

=== Coaching history ===
- (Romania) Petre Ivănescu
- (Croatia) Velimir Kljaić
- (Bosnia and Herzegovina) Sead Hasanefendić
- (Germany) Horst Dreischang (1959–1971)
