= Hendrik Pekeler =

German handball player (born 1991)

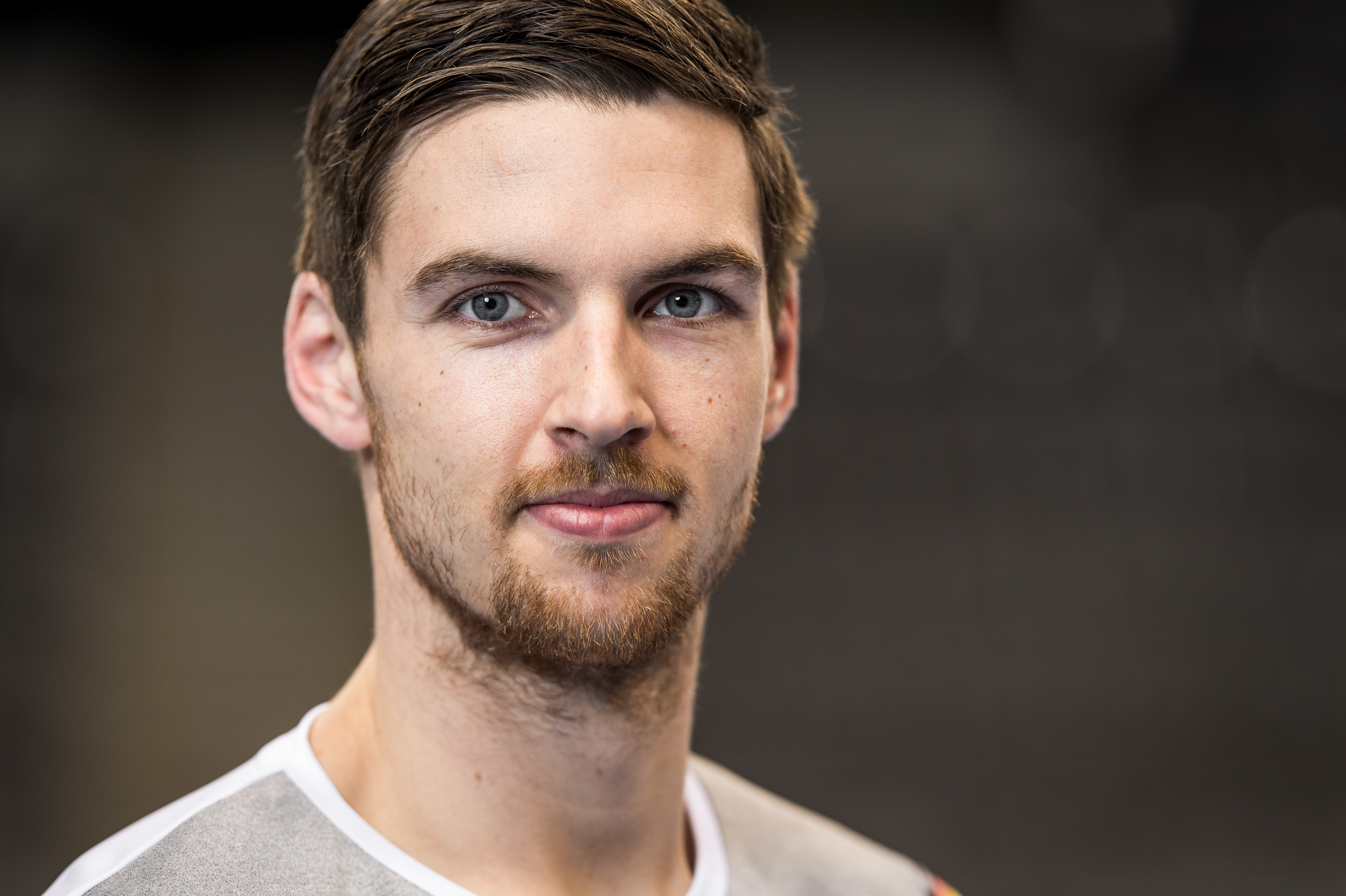
- Pekeler in 2014

Personal information
- Nationality: German
- Born: July 2, 1991 (age 35) Itzehoe, Germany
- Height: 2.03 m (6 ft 8 in)

Sport
- Sport: Handball
- Position: Pivot
- Current club: THW Kiel
- Number: 61

Youth career
- Years: Team
- 2002–2004: ETSV Fortuna Glückstadt
- 2004–2007: MTV Herzhorn
- 2007–2008: Bramstedter TS

Senior clubs
- Years: Team
- 2009–2010: THW Kiel
- 2010–2012: Bergischer HC
- 2012–2015: TBV Lemgo
- 2015–2018: Rhein-Neckar Löwen
- 2018–: THW Kiel
National team
Years	Team	Apps	(Gls)
2012–2024	Germany	122	(210)
Medal record
Olympic Games
Bronze medal – third place	2016 Rio de Janeiro	Team
European Championship
Gold medal – first place	2016 Poland

Hendrik Pekeler (born 2 July 1991) is a German professional handball player for THW Kiel. In 2020 he was selected as the player of the year in German handball.

== Career ==
Pekeler started playing handball at ETSV Fortuna Glückstadt. In 2004, he joined MTV Herzhorn and in 2007, he joined Bramstedter TS. In 2008, he signed a four year contract at THW Kiel. A year later, he joined 2. Bundesliga side TSV Altenholz for a season. From 2009 onwards, he played partly for the Kiel Bundesliga team and partly for the Kiel second team in the Regional liga. In 2010, he joined Bergischer HC on a two year deal. In 2011, he was promoted with the team to the Bundesliga. In 2012, he joined TBV Lemgo on a three year deal. In 2014, he replaced Bjarte Myrhol at Rhein-Neckar Löwen. In 2018, he returned to THW Kiel. On the laround of the 2022-23 season he scored his Bundesligagoal no. 1000.

=== National team ===
Pekeler debuted for the German national team on March 14, 2012.

At the 2016 European Championship, he was part of the German team that won the tournament, beating Spain in the final 24-17.

At the 2016 Olympics, he won bronze medals with the German team. For that, he was awarded the Silbernes Lorbeerblatt.

He participated at the 2019 World Men's Handball Championship where Germany finished fourth.

At the 2020 European Championship, he finished 5th with the German team, and was in the all star team as best defender. At the 2020 Olympics in Tokyo, he also represented Germany.

In January 2024, he retired from the German national team, but continued to play at club level.

== Achievements ==
- EHF Champions League:
  - Gold: 2010, 2020
- EHF Cup:
  - Gold: 2019
- Handball-Bundesliga:
  - Gold: 2010, 2016, 2017, 2020, 2021, 2023
- DHB-Pokal
  - Gold: 2018, 2019, 2022, 2025
- DHB-Supercup:
  - Gold: 2016, 2017, 2020, 2021, 2022, 2023

== Individual awards ==
- Handball Player of the Year in Germany: 2020
- All-Star Team as Best Defender in EHF Champions League: 2022
