= Andreas Palicka =

Swedish handball player (born 1986)

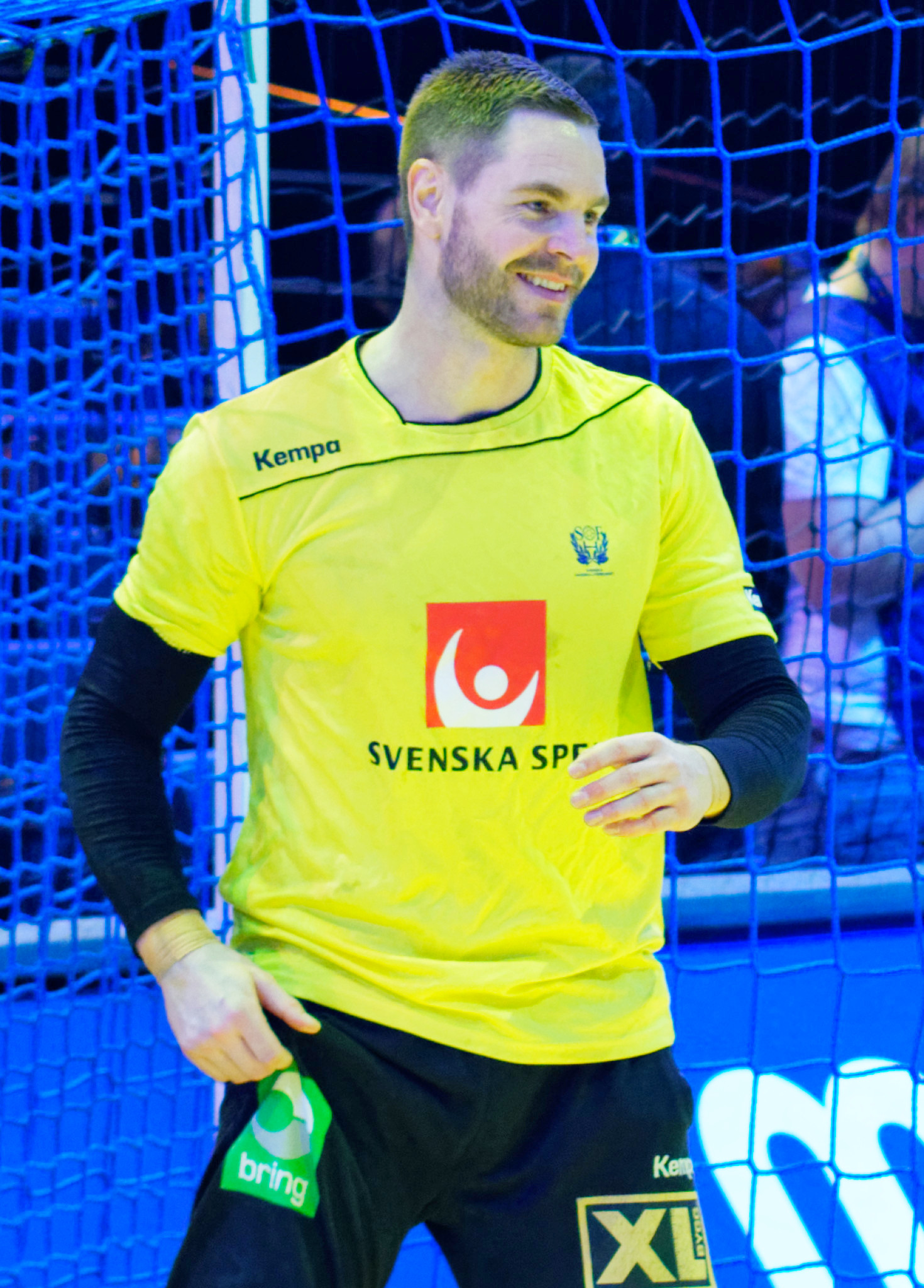
- Palicka in 2017

Personal information
- Full name: Andreas Miroslav Palicka
- Nationality: Swedish
- Born: 10 July 1986 (age 40) Lund, Sweden
- Height: 1.89 m (6 ft 2 in)

Sport
- Sport: Handball
- Position: Goalkeeper
- Current club: Füchse Berlin

Youth career
- Years: Team
- –2002: H 43 Lund

Senior clubs
- Years: Team
- 2002–2008: Redbergslids IK
- 2008–2015: THW Kiel
- 2015–2016: Aalborg Håndbold
- 2016–12/2021: Rhein-Neckar Löwen
- 12/2021–2022: Redbergslids IK
- 2022–2025: Paris Saint-Germain
- 2025–02/2026: Kolstad Håndball
- 02/2026–06/2026: HSG Wetzlar
- 2026–: Füchse Berlin
National team
Years	Team	Apps	(Gls)
2007–2026	Sweden	185	(19)
Medal record
World Championship
Silver medal – second place	2021 Egypt
European Championship
Gold medal – first place	2022 Hungary/Slovakia
Silver medal – second place	2018 Croatia
Bronze medal – third place	2024 Germany
- Updated on 2 February 2026

Andreas Miroslav Palicka (Swedish pronunciation: [ˈpalɪka]; Czech: Palička, Czech pronunciation: [ˈpalɪtʃka]; born 10 July 1986) is a Swedish handball player for Füchse Berlin. He is widely regarded as one of the best goalkeepers of his generation.

== Club career ==
Palicka began his professional handball career at Redbergslids IK in 2002, where he joined from his childhood club H43 Lund. He joined German club THW Kiel in 2008 and won the German Championship and German Cup in his debut season with the team. Palicka went on to win five additional league titles, three additional cup titles, the EHF Champions League twice, the IHF Super Globe, and four German Super Cup titles during his time with the club.

In 2015, he moved to Danish side Aalborg Håndbold. Following a season with the club, Palicka returned to Germany and signed for Rhein-Neckar Löwen in 2016. Here he was goalkeeper partner with national team colleague Mikael Appelgren. With the Lions he won the league, cup and two super cup titles, before returning to Redbergslids in 2021. He was signed to help them avoid relegation, which they managed to do. Palicka joined French club Paris Saint-Germain in 2022 and won the French Championship in his first season with the club.

On 2 January 2025, Palicka signed a two-year contract with Kolstad Håndball from 2025 to 2027, where he replaced Norwegian national team goalkeeper Torbjørn Bergerud who went to the Polish handball club Wisla Plock. With the club he came second in both the Norwegian Championship and the Norwegian Cup in the 2024-25 season. He left the club in February 2026 due to the club's precarious financial situation. A few days later he announced that he would join German club HSG Wetzlar for the rest of the season and then join Füchse Berlin for the 2026-27 season.

== International career ==
Palicka began his international career by representing Sweden at youth level, playing for the under-19 and under-21 sides. He was part of the under-21 team that won the 2007 Junior World Championship.

Palicka made his debut for the Swedish national team in 2007. He won the 2022 European Championship, placed second at the 2018 European Championship and 2021 World Championship, and finished third at the 2024 European Championship with the national team. Palicka represented Sweden at the 2020 Olympic Games, where Sweden went out in the quarterfinals to Spain.

He retired from the national team after the 2026 European Men's Handball Championship, where Sweden finished 6th.

== Personal life ==
Palicka is part Czech through his father.

== Honours ==
=== Club ===
THW Kiel

- EHF Champions League: 2010, 2012
- IHF Super Globe: 2011
- Bundesliga: 2009, 2010, 2012, 2013, 2014, 2015
- DHB-Pokal: 2009, 2011, 2012, 2013
- DHB-Supercup: 2011, 2012, 2014, 2015

Rhein-Neckar Löwen

- Bundesliga: 2017
- DHB-Pokal: 2018
- DHB-Supercup: 2017, 2018

Paris Saint-Germain

- LNH Division 1: 2023, 2024, 2025
- Trophée des Champions: 2023

=== International ===
- IHF World Championship
  - Silver: 2021
- EHF European Championship
  - Gold: 2022
  - Silver: 2018
  - Bronze: 2024

=== Individual awards ===
- Swedish Handballer of the Year: 2020
- All-Star Goalkeeper of the World Championship: 2021
