= Harald Reinkind =

Norwegian handball player (born 1992)

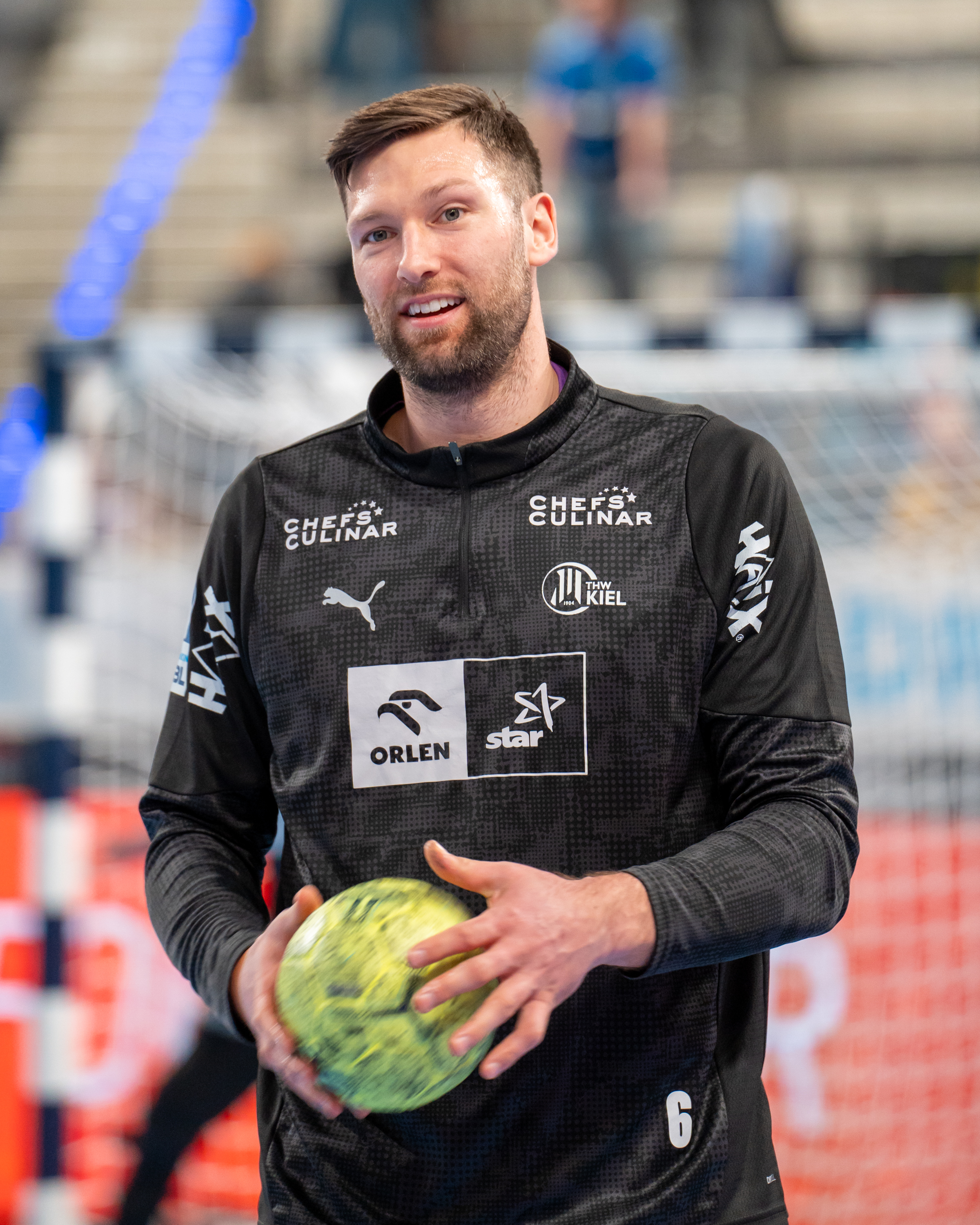
- Reinkind 2026

Personal information
- Nationality: Norwegian
- Born: 17 August 1992 (age 34) Tønsberg, Norway
- Height: 1.96 m (6 ft 5 in)

Sport
- Sport: Handball
- Position: Right back
- Current club: THW Kiel
- Number: 6

Youth career
- Years: Team
- 2000–2005: IL Gneist
- 2005–2008: FyllingenBergen

Senior clubs
- Years: Team
- 2008–2014: FyllingenBergen
- 2014–2018: Rhein-Neckar Löwen
- 2018–: THW Kiel
National team
Years	Team	Apps	(Gls)
2011–	Norway	176	(387)
Medal record
World Championship
Silver medal – second place	2019 Germany/Denmark
European Championship
Bronze medal – third place	2020 Sweden/Austria/Norway

Harald Reinkind (born 17 August 1992) is a Norwegian professional handball player for THW Kiel and the Norwegian national team.

He participated at the 2019 World Men's Handball Championship.

== Honours ==
- EHF Champions League:
  - Gold: 2020
- EHF Cup:
  - Gold: 2019
- Handball-Bundesliga:
  - Gold: 2016, 2017, 2020, 2021, 2023
- DHB-Pokal
  - Gold: 2018, 2019, 2022, 2025
- DHB-Supercup
  - Gold: 2016, 2017, 2020, 2021, 2022, 2023
