= Rasmus Lauge =

Danish handball player (born 1991)

Rasmus Lauge Schmidt
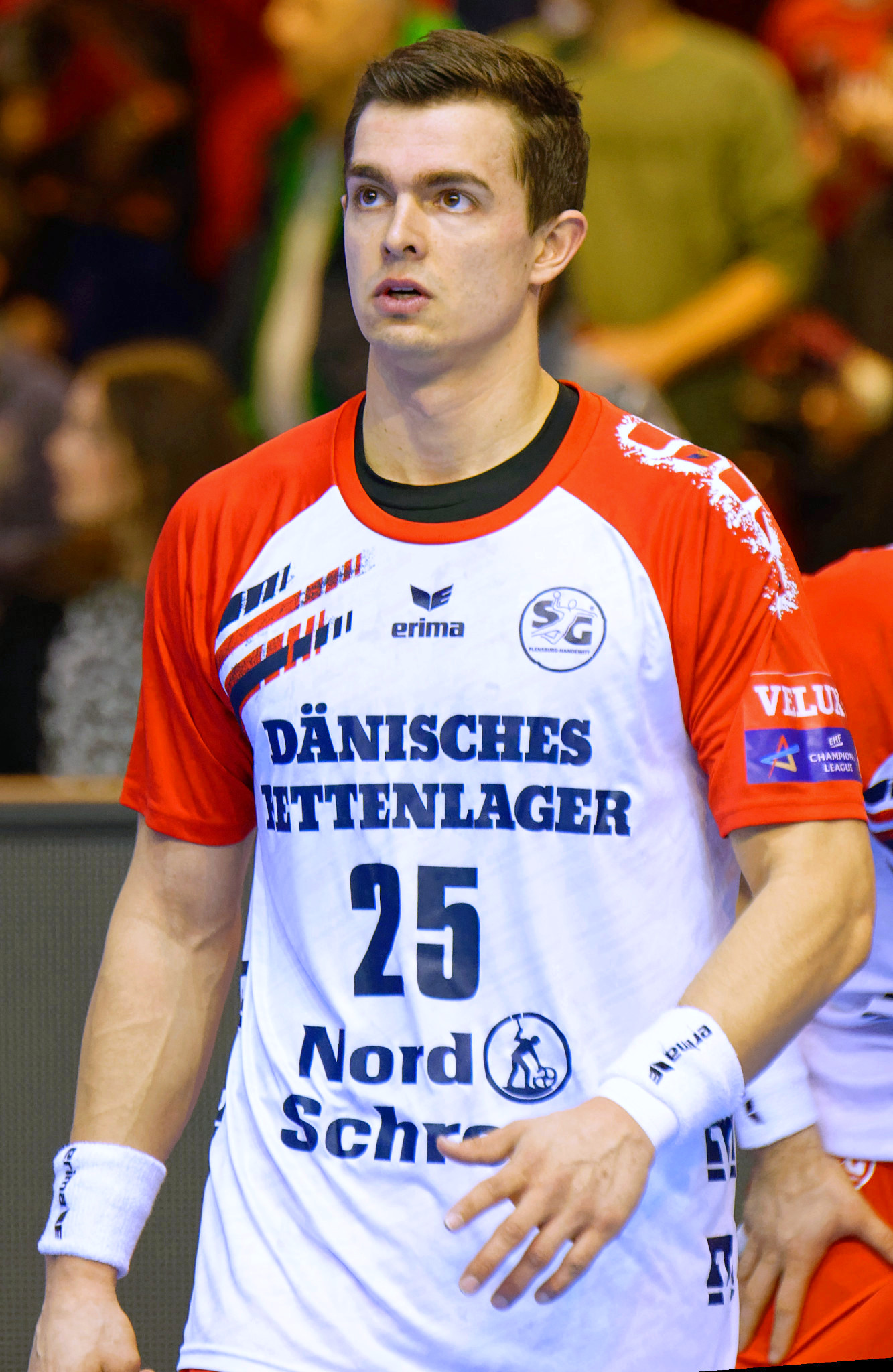
- Lauge in 2016

Personal information
- Nationality: Danish
- Born: 20 June 1991 (age 35) Randers, Denmark
- Height: 1.93 m (6 ft 4 in)

Sport
- Sport: Handball
- Position: Centre back/Left back
- Current club: Bjerringbro-Silkeborg Håndbold
- Number: 25

Youth career
- Years: Team
- –2009: Bjerringbro FH

Senior clubs
- Years: Team
- 2009–2013: Bjerringbro-Silkeborg
- 2013–2015: THW Kiel
- 2015–2019: SG Flensburg-Handewitt
- 2019–2023: Telekom Veszprém
- 2023–: Bjerringbro-Silkeborg Håndbold
National team
Years	Team	Apps	(Gls)
2010–	Denmark	180	(454)
Medal record
Olympic Games
Gold medal – first place	2024 Paris	Team
World Championship
Gold medal – first place	2019 Germany/Denmark
Gold medal – first place	2023 Poland/Sweden
Gold medal – first place	2025 Croatia/Denmark/Norway
Silver medal – second place	2011 Sweden
Silver medal – second place	2013 Spain
European Championship
Gold medal – first place	2012 Serbia
Gold medal – first place	2026 Denmark/Norway/Sweden
Silver medal – second place	2024 Germany
Bronze medal – third place	2022 Hungary/Slovakia
Junior World Championship
Silver medal – second place	2009 Egypt
- Updated on 29 January 2025

Rasmus Lauge Schmidt (born 20 June 1991) is a Danish handball player for Bjerringbro-Silkeborg Håndbold and the Danish national team.

He made his debut for Denmark's handball team in 2010, and with them has won World and European Championships. He has previously played for German side THW Kiel and Danish side Bjerringbro-Silkeborg. At the 2026 European Men's Handball Championship he won gold medals, meaning that Denmark held both the World, European and Olympic titles at the same time, as only the second team ever after France's 'Les Experts'.

== Clubs ==
Lauge began his handball career in Bjerringbro FH. In 2009 he signed a 3-year deal with Bjerringbro-Silkeborg. He signed a 3-year contract with THW Kiel on 28 February 2013, which began with the start of the 2013–2014 season. On 5 May 2015 Lauge signed a 3-year deal with SG Flensburg-Handewitt.

On 5 March 2018 it was announced that Rasmus Lauge would continue his career with Hungarian side Telekom Veszprém joining the club from the 2019/2020 season. He signed a two-year contract with the club.

In 2023 he returned to Bjerringbro-Silkeborg.

== Honours ==
- German Championship
  - Gold: 2014, 2015, 2018, 2019
  - Silver: 2016, 2017
- DHB-Supercup:
  - Gold: 2013, 2014
  - Silver: 2015, 2018
- Danish Championship:
  - Silver: 2011, 2012
  - Bronze: 2010
- Hungarian League
  - Gold: 2023
  - Silver: 2021, 2022
- Hungarian Cup
  - Gold: 2021, 2022, 2023
- SEHA League
  - Gold: 2020, 2021, 2022
