= Marius Steinhauser =

German handball player (born 1993)

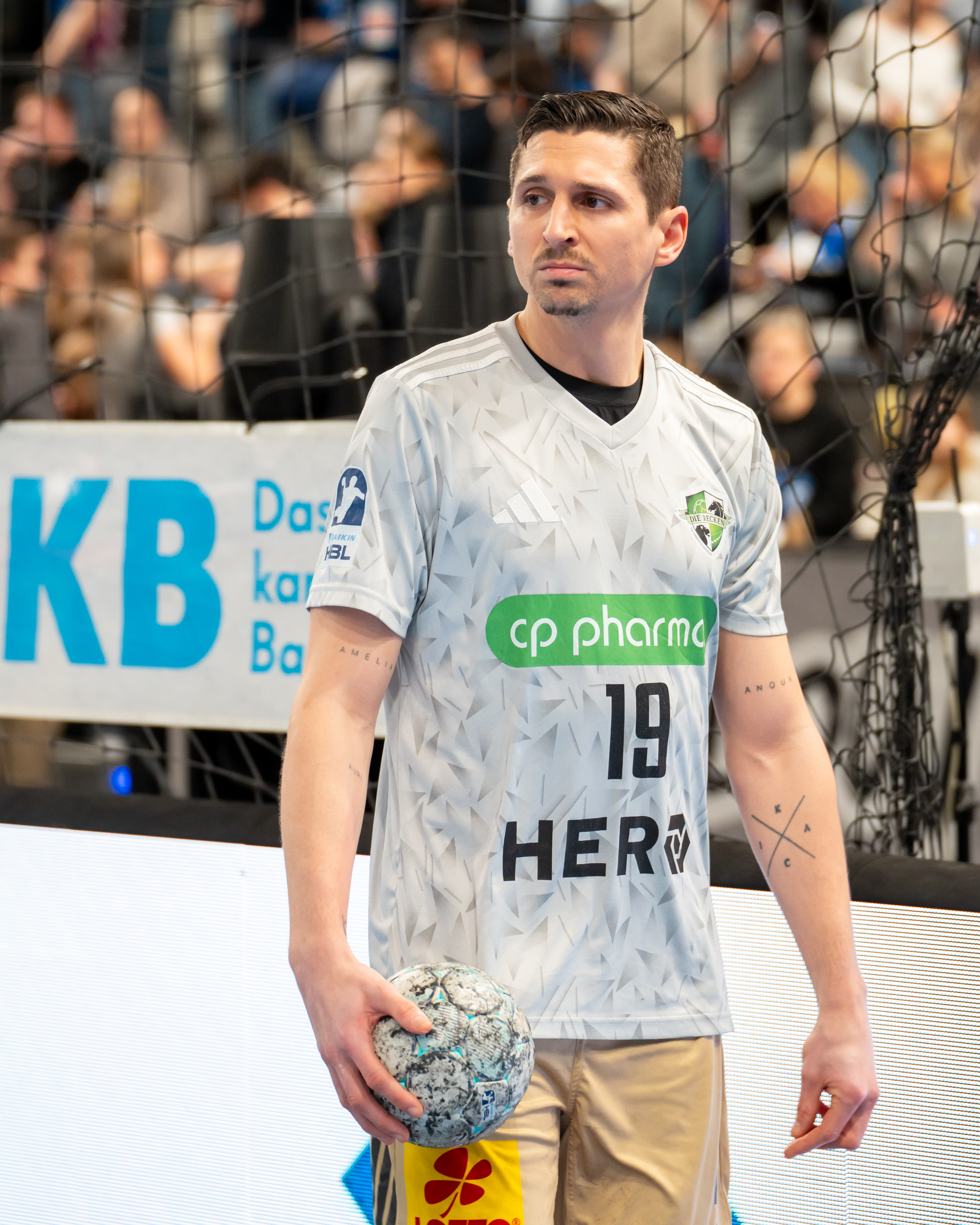

Personal information
- Nationality: German
- Born: 6 February 1993 (age 33) Karlsruhe, Germany
- Height: 1.87 m (6 ft 2 in)

Sport
- Sport: Handball
- Position: Right Wing
- Current club: TSV Hannover-Burgdorf

Youth career
- Years: Team
- 2007–2011: TSV 05 Rot
- 2011–2012: HG Oftersheim/Schwetzingen

Senior clubs
- Years: Team
- 2012–2017: Rhein-Neckar Löwen
- 2017–2022: SG Flensburg-Handewitt
- 2022–2026: TSV Hannover-Burgdorf
- 2026–: Rhein-Neckar Löwen

Marius Steinhauser (born 6 February 1993) is a German handball player for TSV Hannover-Burgdorf.

== Honours ==
- German Championship
  - Gold: 2016, 2017, 2018, 2019
  - Silver: 2014, 2015
  - Bronze: 2013
- German Super Cup
  - Gold: 2015
- EHF Cup
  - Gold:2013
