= Mads Mensah Larsen =

Danish handball player (born 1991)

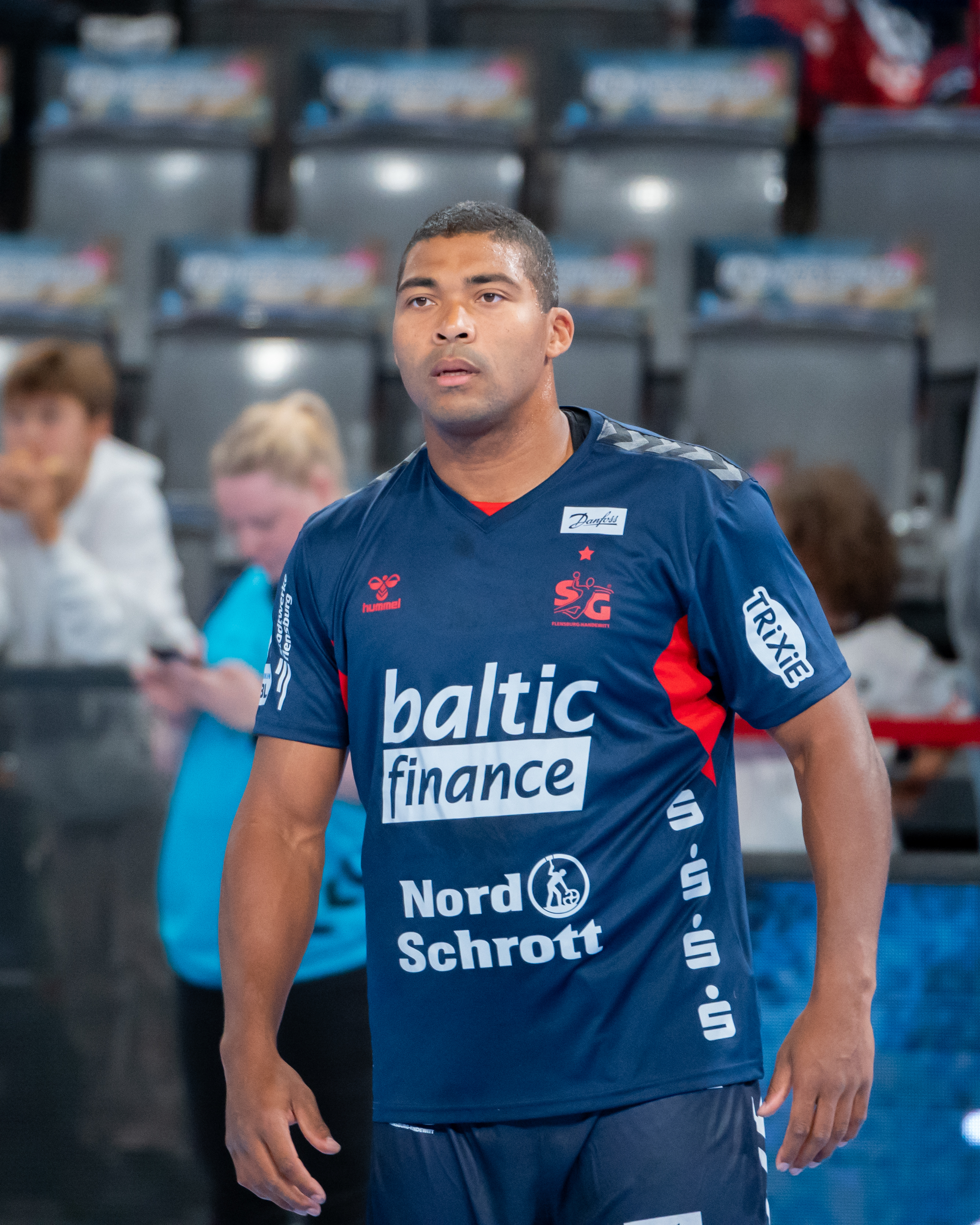
- Larsen in 2024

Personal information
- Nationality: Danish
- Born: 12 August 1991 (age 35) Holbæk, Denmark
- Height: 1.88 m (6 ft 2 in)

Sport
- Sport: Handball
- Position: Centre back
- Current club: Skjern Håndbold
- Number: 18

Youth career
- Years: Team
- –: Himmelev
- –: Holbæk
- –: FIF

Senior clubs
- Years: Team
- 2009–2012: AG København
- 2010–2011: → Nordsjælland Håndbold (loan)
- 2012–2014: Aalborg Håndbold
- 2014–2020: Rhein-Neckar Löwen
- 2020–2025: SG Flensburg-Handewitt
- 2025–: Skjern Håndbold
National team
Years	Team	Apps	(Gls)
2011–2026	Denmark	225	(341)
Medal record
Olympic Games
Gold medal – first place	2016 Rio de Janeiro	Team
Silver medal – second place	2020 Tokyo	Team
World Championship
Gold medal – first place	2019 Germany/Denmark
Gold medal – first place	2021 Egypt
Gold medal – first place	2023 Poland/Sweden
Gold medal – first place	2025 Croatia/Denmark/Norway
Silver medal – second place	2013 Spain
European Championship
Gold medal – first place	2026 Denmark/Norway/Sweden
Silver medal – second place	2014 Denmark
Silver medal – second place	2024 Germany
Bronze medal – third place	2022 Hungary/Slovakia
Junior World Championship
Silver medal – second place	2011 Greece

Mads Mensah Larsen (born 12 August 1991) is a Danish handball player for Skjern Håndbold and formerly the Denmark national team.

Mensah started his senior career at AG København, where he won the Danish Championship in 2012. In 2010-11 he was loaned out to Nordsjælland Håndbold. He left AGK in 2012, when the team went bankrupt. He then joined Aalborg Håndbold, where he also won the Danish Championship. In 2014 he went abroad to the German clubs Rhein-Neckar Löwen and SG Flensburg-Handewitt. In 2025 he returned to Denmark to join Skjern Håndbold, despite his contract with Flensburg-Handewitt running until 2026. After the club told him his contract would not be extended after 2026, he made the decision to return to Denmark.

At the 2026 European Men's Handball Championship he won gold medals, meaning that Denmark held both the World, European and Olympic titles at the same time, as only the second team ever after France's 'Les Experts'. He acted mainly as a back-up during the tournament. Due to Denmark's many injuries at the pivot position, he did play there as a makeshift solution in the final. After the tournament, he retired from the Danish national team. Afterwards, the Danish head coach Nikolaj Jacobsen said that he wished Mensah had continued, although he did respect the decision.

He studied Humanistic informatics at Aalborg University. He has a Danish mother and a Ghanaian father.

== Honours ==
- German Championship
  - Gold: 2016, 2017
  - Silver: 2015
- Danish Championship:
  - Gold: 2012, 2013
