= Nikolaj Jacobsen =

Danish handball player and coach (born 1971)

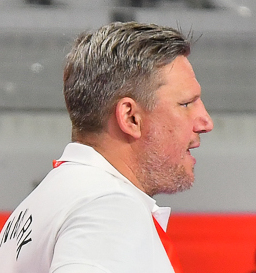
- Jacobsen with Denmark at the 2018 European Championship

Personal information
- Full name: Nikolaj Bredahl Jacobsen
- Nationality: Danish
- Born: 22 November 1971 (age 54) Viborg, Denmark
- Height: 1.84 m (6 ft 0 in)

Sport
- Sport: Handball
- Position: Left wing
- Current club: Denmark (manager)

Youth career
- Years: Team
- 1984–1990: GOG

Senior clubs
- Years: Team
- 1990–1997: GOG
- 1997–1998: TSV Bayer Dormagen
- 1998–2004: THW Kiel
- 2004–2007: Viborg HK
- 2007–2012: Bjerringbro-Silkeborg
National team
Years	Team	Apps	(Gls)
1991–2003	Denmark	148	(584)

Teams managed
- 2012–2014: Aalborg Håndbold
- 2014–2019: Rhein-Neckar Löwen
- 2017–: Denmark

Nikolaj Bredahl Jacobsen (born 22 November 1971) is a Danish professional handball coach and former handballer who is currently the coach of the Danish national team. He was named World Coach of the Year in 2019 and 2021 by the IHF. He is the first manager of a national team to win four consecutive world championships (2019–2025).

As a coach, Jacobsen won the 2013 Danish Handball League with Aalborg Håndbold and led Rhein-Neckar Löwen to back-to-back German Handball-Bundesliga championships in the 2015–16 and 2016–17 seasons. He is the first Danish manager to win the German Bundesliga.

During his playing career, Jacobsen predominantly played as a left wing and most prominently represented the Danish club GOG Håndbold and the German club THW Kiel. He won three Danish Handball League championships with GOG, as well as three Handball-Bundesliga championships and two European EHF Champions League titles with Kiel. Jacobsen played 148 games and scored 584 goals for the Denmark men's national handball team from 1991 to 2003, and was named Danish Handball Player of the Year in 1993 and 1999. He holds the Danish record for the most goals scored in a single international match, with 15.

== Playing career ==
Born in Viborg, Nikolaj Jacobsen moved with his parents to Southern Funen as a child, and began playing handball at the age of 11. He was a skilled association football player as well, and was among the most talented Danish youth football players, while also playing for the Denmark youth national handball team.

Having played youth handball at GOG Håndbold, Nikolaj Jacobsen made his senior debut for the club in 1990, at the age of 18. At GOG, Jacobsen played both centre backcourt and left wingman. He became known as a highly skilled player, able to score goals with a wide variety of shots. In his second senior year, Jacobsen made his debut for the senior Denmark men's national handball team, under national team coach Anders Dahl-Nielsen. Under coach Bent Nyegaard, Jacobsen and GOG won the 1992 Danish Handball League, and the following year, Jacobsen was named Danish Handball Player of the Year. He helped GOG win the 1995 and 1996 Danish Handball Leagues, and became top goalscorer of the Danish 1997 season, with 205 goals scored.

In 1997, at the age of 26, Jacobsen moved to German Handball-Bundesliga team TSV Bayer Dormagen. Jacobsen scored 189 goals in 28 Bundesliga matches during the 1998 season, though Bayer Dormagen finished in 14th place, and were eventually relegated. However, Jacobsen had caught the attention of reigning Bundesliga champions THW Kiel, and following one year at Bayer Dormagen, he moved on to Kiel.

At Kiel, Jacobsen was coached by Croatian coach Zvonimir Serdarušić, and it was here he became one of the best left wingmen in the world. The temperamental Jacobsen was also taught to be a team player, by his new Swedish teammates Magnus Wislander, Staffan Olsson and Stefan Lövgren. When Jacobsen complained that Stefan Lövgren would not pass him the ball, Lövgren replied: "When you talk nicely, you will get the ball." Jacobsen and Lövgren soon became close friends. In the following three seasons, Jacobsen scored 1,015 goals in a total of 142 games for Kiel, as the club won two Handball Bundesliga championships and two German Cup titles. Kiel also finished second in the international 1999–2000 EHF Champions League tournament, losing 52–54 on aggregate to FC Barcelona Handbol in the final.

On 27 September 1998, Jacobsen set a new record for most goals scored in a match for the Denmark national team, when he scored 15 goals against the Greece men's national handball team, in a qualification match for the 1999 World Handball Championship. Denmark won the game 33–20. The previous record of 14 goals in a game had been set by Flemming Hansen in 1971, and had been equalled by left wingman Lars Christiansen in another game against Greece, only four days before Jacobsen broke the record. Jacobsen was once again named Denmark Handball Player of the Year in 1999, and was selected for the 1999–2000 Bundesliga All-Star Team.

In the opening game of the 2001–02 Bundesliga season, Jacobsen injured his knee when he collided with the goalkeeper of opposing team SG Wallau/Massenheim. The injury became a recurring problem, and over the following three seasons, Jacobsen played only 72 games, scoring 331 goals for Kiel. He still helped the club win another Bundesliga championship, as well as two international EHF Cup titles. The injury also meant that Jacobsen was absent from the Denmark team which won bronze medals at the 2002 European Championship. Unable to fully recover from his injury, Jacobsen left Kiel in 2004 and moved back to Denmark to become player-coach.

He was included in the European Handball Federation Hall of Fame in 2023.

== Coaching career ==
Nikolaj Jacobsen moved to Viborg HK in the Danish Handball League, the club of his birth town of Viborg. While at Viborg HK, Jacobsen undertook a teacher education, and coached handball at Viborg HK's sports college. At Viborg HK, Jacobsen played under Danish head coach Ulrik Wilbek. When Wilbek left to coach the Denmark national handball team, Jacobsen became assistant coach to new head coach Søren Hildebrand, while still maintaining his active career. Jacobsen scored 71 goals in 28 league games for Viborg during his time at the club, but focused increasingly on his role as assistant coach. In Jacobsen's time at Viborg, the club finished runners-up in the 2007 Danish Handball League, and reached two Danish Cup finals.

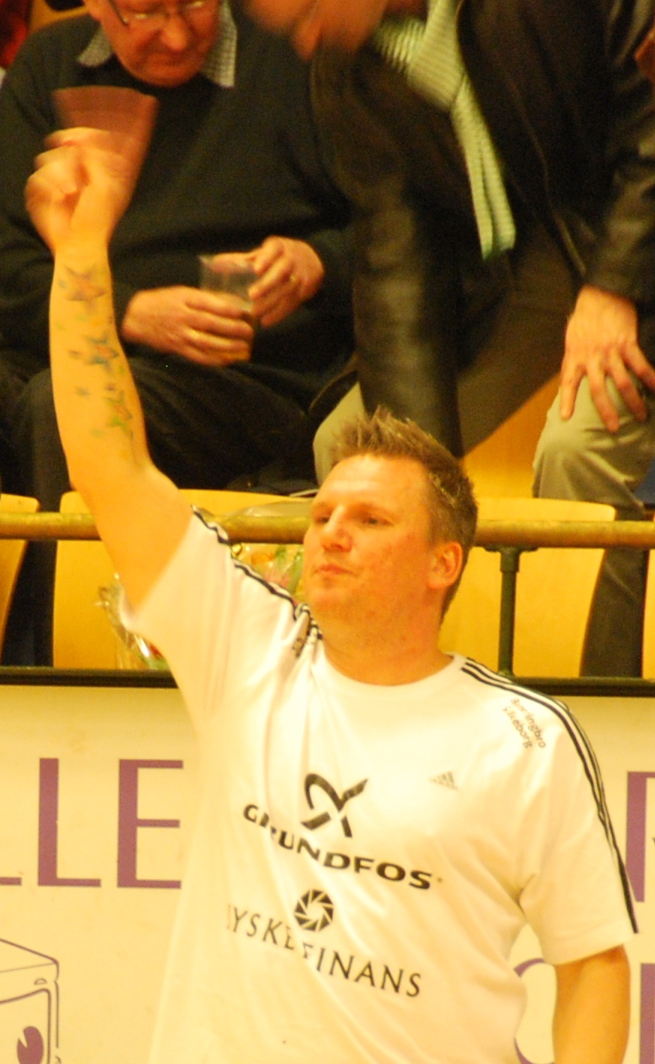
Jacobsen at BSV in 2011.

In 2007, Jacobsen moved to rival Danish Handball League club Bjerringbro-Silkeborg (BSV), to fill the role of assistant coach to Danish head coach Carsten Albrektsen. Jacobsen also played a few games for BSV, scoring six goals in nine league matches. BSV finished runners-up twice and in third place once, in the five seasons Jacobsen spent with the club. During his time at BSV, Jacobsen clashed with management over coaching principles, and even considered ending his coaching career.

It was time for Jacobsen to become head coach, and he moved to Danish Handball League team Aalborg Håndbold in 2012. He brought former teammate Morten Bjerre with him as assistant coach. In his first season at the club, Aalborg won the 2013 Danish Handball League, and finished runners-up in his second season. By then, Jacobsen had announced his intention to leave Aalborg in 2014.

Jacobsen joined German Handball-Bundesliga team Rhein-Neckar Löwen, replacing Icelandic coach Guðmundur Guðmundsson who had just become head coach of the Denmark national handball team. In his first season with Rhein-Neckar Löwen, Jacobsen led the team to finish runners-up in the Bundesliga. In his second year at the club, Löwen won the 2016 Bundesliga, their first Handball-Bundesliga championship, which also made Jacobsen the first Danish manager to win the Handball-Bundesliga. The following season, Löwen successfully defended the Bundesliga championship.

In March 2017, Jacobsen was appointed head coach of the Denmark national handball team, while still coaching Rhein-Neckar Löwen. He replaced Guðmundur Guðmundsson as national coach for Denmark.

=== Denmark national team ===
Under Jacobsen's leadership, Denmark started its rise to become one of the best national teams in the history of the sport. At the 2019 World Men's Handball Championship Denmark won their first gold medal, beating Norway in the final. At the 2020 Olympics Denmark had to be contend with a silver medal, as they lost to France.

At the 2021 World Men's Handball Championship in Egypt he won his second consecutive title. At the tournament, Denmark would also beat the record for most World Championship matches in a row without losing with 19, taking the record from France.

Two years later he won his third World Cup title, which made Denmark the first men's team the first men's team to win three consecutive world championship titles. They beat Spain in the semifinal and France in the final.

The 2024 Olympics would become one of the most dominant performances ever seen by a national team, when Denmark won every single match and beat Germany in the final 39-26, which was the biggest ever win in an Olympics final.

A year later he won his fourth World Championship title out of four possible, making Denmark the only team, men's or women's, to have done so. They also beat the record for largest average win margin at the tournament with +13.4. In addition, Denmark extended their consecutive win record to 37.

At the 2026 European Men's Handball Championship he won gold medals, meaning that Denmark held both the World, European and Olympic titles at the same time, as only the second team ever after France's 'Les Experts'. This was the stated goal he had before the tournament, as it was the last international tournament he had not won.

== Honours ==
=== Player ===
- EHF Cup:
  - Gold: 2002, 2004
- German Championship:
  - Gold: 1999, 2000, 2002
- German Cup:
  - Gold: 1999, 2000
- Danish Handball League:
  - Gold: 1992, 1995, 1996

=== Manager ===
- German Championship:
  - Gold: 2016, 2017
  - Silver: 2015
- German Cup:
  - Gold: 2018
- Danish Championship:
  - Gold: 2013
- World Men's Handball Championship:
  - Gold: 2019, 2021, 2023, 2025
- European Men's Handball Championship:
  - Gold: 2026
  - Silver: 2024
  - Bronze: 2022
- Olympic Games:
  - Gold: 2024
  - Silver: 2020

=== Individual ===
- Danish "Handball Player of the Year": 1993, 1999
- IHF World Coach of the Year (male teams): 2019, 2021
- EHF Hall of Fame: 2023
