= Mikael Appelgren (handballer) =

Swedish handball player (born 1989)

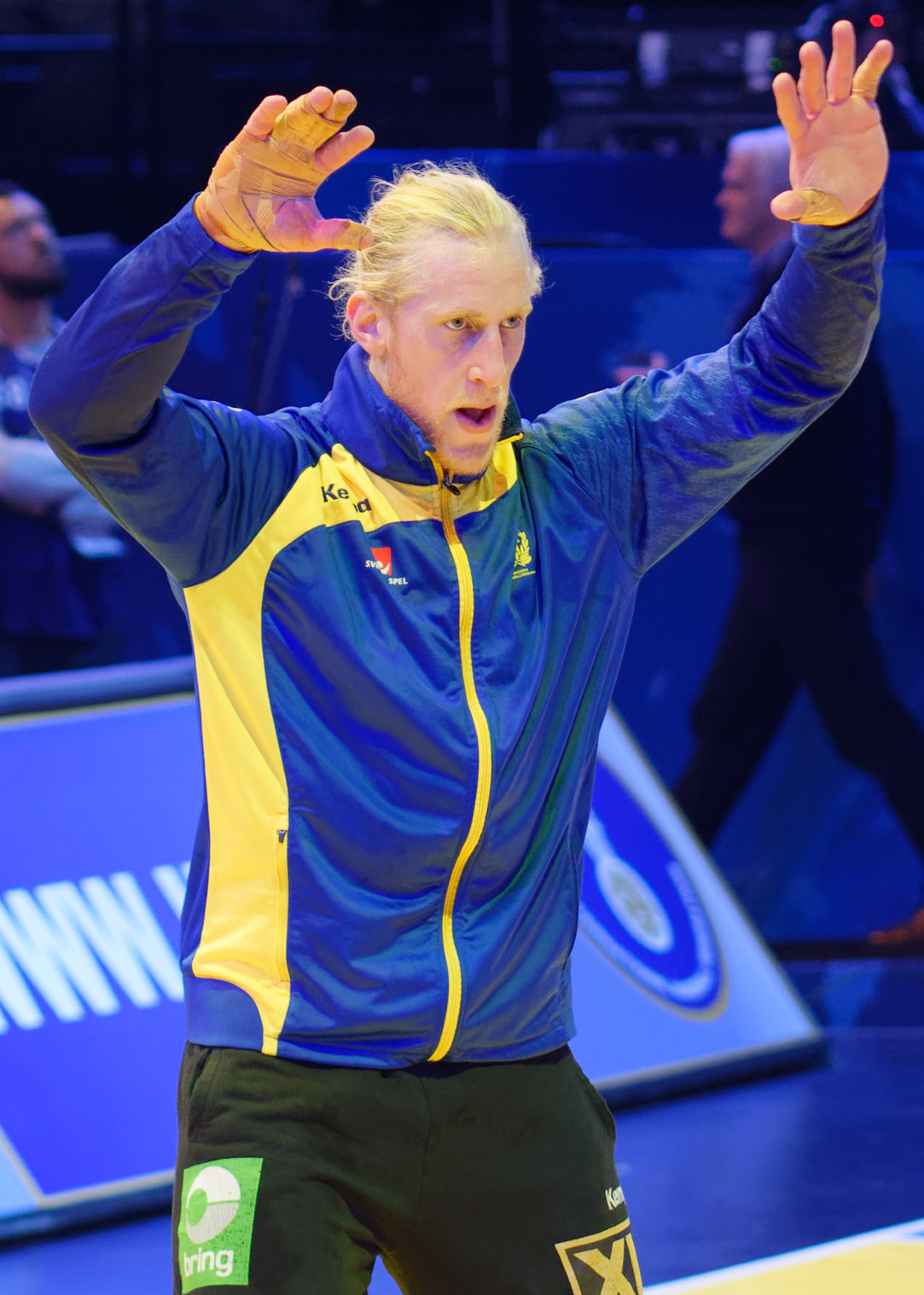

Personal information
- Nationality: Swedish
- Born: 6 September 1989 (age 37) Uddevalla, Sweden
- Height: 1.91 m (6 ft 3 in)

Sport
- Sport: Handball
- Position: Goalkeeper
- Current club: ONE Veszprém
- Number: 1

Senior clubs
- Years: Team
- –2009: GF Kroppskultur
- 2009–2012: IFK Skövde
- 2012–2015: MT Melsungen
- 2015–2025: Rhein-Neckar Löwen
- 2025–: ONE Veszprém
National team
Years	Team	Apps	(Gls)
2011–2020	Sweden	101	(2)
Medal record
European Championship
Silver medal – second place	2018 Croatia
- Updated on 14 January 2026

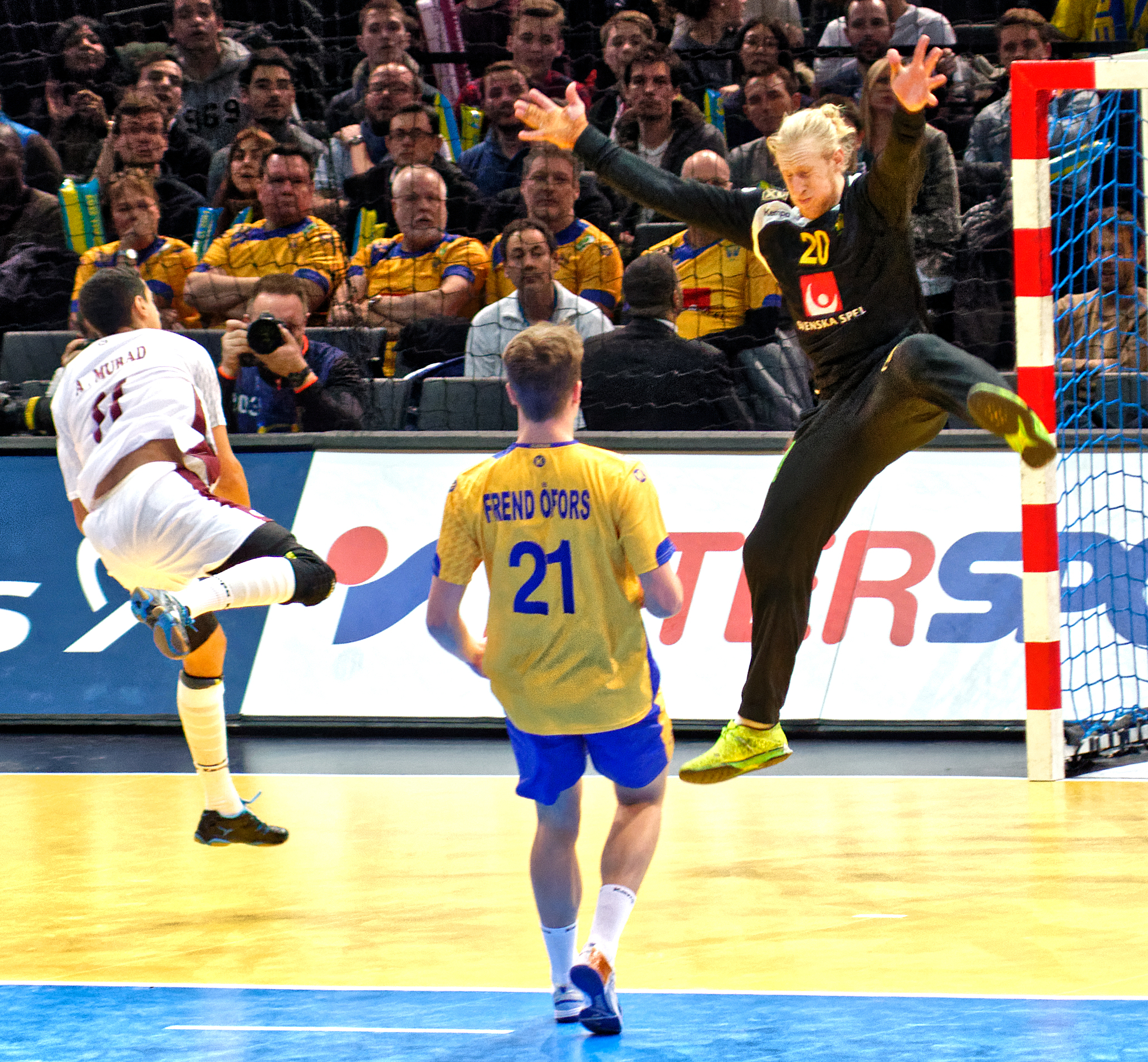
18 January 2017.

Mikael Appelgren (born 6 September 1989) is a Swedish handball player for ONE Veszprém. He was named Swedish Handballer of the Year in 2017.

== Career ==
Appelgren started playing handball at GF Kroppskultur, before joining IFK Skövde in 2009. In the 2011–12 season he was part of the Swedish league all-star team. After three seasons at IFK Skövde he joined German Bundesliga team MT Melsungen. Here he played for three seasons before joining league rivals Rhein-Neckar Löwen for the 2015–16 season to get more playing time. Here he won the German championship in his first season at the club. This was the first championship in club history. In 2017 he won the league for a second time. In 2018 he was named Swedish handballer of the year.

At the end of the 2019–20 season Appelgren was operated for a finger injury. In October 2020 he had to be operated again due to a tendon injury in the shoulder. In December the same year he was on the operation table for a third time; this time due to a cartilage-damaged knee. These injuries made him miss the entire 2020–21 season. In August 2021 he was once again through a knee operation. In March 2022 he was once again part of a match day squad for Rhein-Neckar Löwen.

=== National team ===
He debuted for the Swedish national team in 2011 in a European Championship qualification match against Israel.

He competed at the 2016 European Men's Handball Championship. Here he acted as a backup for Mattias Andersson. He also represented Sweden at the 2017 World Championship together with Andreas Palicka.

He won silver medals at the 2018 European Championship.

After a long time away from handball due to injuries, he was once again part of the Swedish team at the 2023 World Championship. He made his comeback in a preparation match leading up to tournament against Serbia.
