= Kim Ekdahl Du Rietz =

Swedish handball player (born 1989)

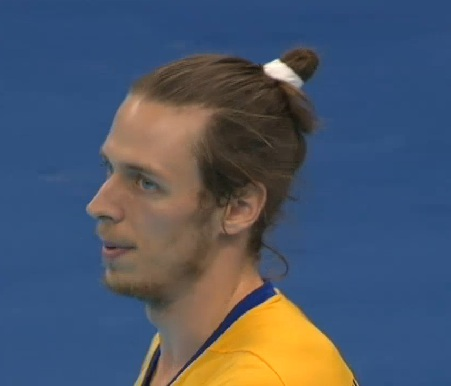
- Ekdahl Du Rietz playing for Sweden in 2012

Personal information
- Nationality: Swedish
- Born: 23 July 1989 (age 37) Lund, Sweden
- Height: 1.94 m (6 ft 4 in)

Sport
- Sport: Handball
- Position: Left back

Senior clubs
- Years: Team
- 2005–2011: Lugi HF
- 2011–2012: HBC Nantes
- 2012–2017: Rhein-Neckar Löwen
- 2018: Rhein-Neckar Löwen
- 2018–2020: Paris Saint-Germain
- 2021: Rhein-Neckar Löwen
National team
Years	Team	Apps	(Gls)
2007–2020	Sweden	96	(274)

Teams managed
- 2023: Hong kong
Medal record
Olympic Games
Silver medal – second place	2012 London	Team

Kim Ekdahl Du Rietz (born 23 July 1989) is a Swedish retired handball player.

== Career ==
He competed for the Swedish national team at the 2012 Summer Olympics in London where they won a silver medal. In January 2017 he announced his retirement following the conclusion of the 2016–2017 Bundesliga season.

In 2018, Ekdahl Du Rietz returned to his former club Rhein-Neckar Löwen, signing a three-month contract to help the club – currently suffering from several injuries on important players – out. Ekdahl Du Rietz also decided to give away all the money earned to charity organisations. In April 2018 his club Rhein-Neckar Löwen announced that next season Kim Ekdahl Du Rietz will transfer to Paris Saint-Germain Handball. At the same time he also made a comeback to the Swedish national team, and participated in both 2019 World Championship and 2020 European Championship.

In 2020 he announced once again that he's retiring, both from the Swedish national team, and his club team at the time, Paris Saint-Germain Handball.

21 May 2021, after one of his previous club teams Rhein-Neckar Löwen has had a lot of injuries, it is announced that Ekdahl Du Rietz will join the team for the two last games in the EHF European League finals, that are being played 22 & 23 May.
