= Dani Baijens =

Dutch handball player (born 1998)

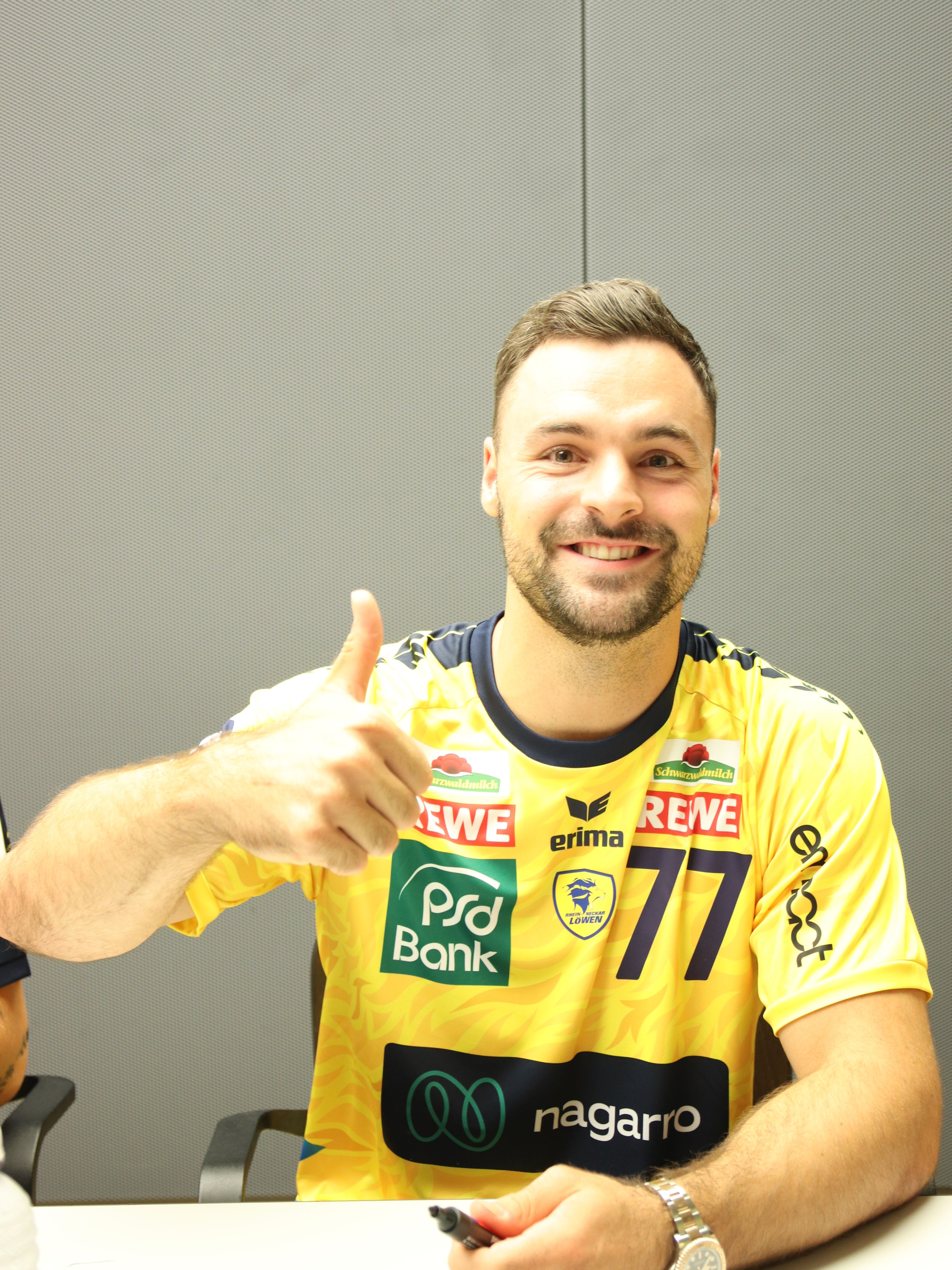
- Baijens in 2025

Personal information
- Nationality: Dutch
- Born: 5 May 1998 (age 28) Rotterdam, Netherlands
- Height: 1.82 m (6 ft 0 in)

Sport
- Sport: Handball
- Position: Centre/Left back
- Current club: Rhein-Neckar Löwen
- Number: 77

Youth career
- Years: Team
- Snelwiek Rotterdam

Senior clubs
- Years: Team
- –2015: HARO Rotterdam
- 2015–2017: KRAS/Volendam
- 2017–2018: SG Flensburg-Handewitt
- 2018–2021: TBV Lemgo
- 2021–2022: ASV Hamm-Westfalen
- 2022–2024: HSV Hamburg
- 2024–2025: Paris Saint-Germain
- 2025–: Rhein-Neckar Löwen
National team
Years	Team	Apps	(Gls)
2016–	Netherlands	79	(213)

Dani Baijens (born 5 May 1998) is a Dutch handball player for Rhein-Neckar Löwen and the Dutch national team.

He represented the Netherlands at the 2020 European Men's Handball Championship and the 2022 European Men's Handball Championship.
