= Mateusz Piechowski =

Polish handball player (born 1995)

Personal information
- Nationality: Polish
- Born: 1 March 1995 (age 31) Płock, Poland
- Height: 2.10 m (6 ft 11 in)

Sport
- Sport: Handball
- Position: Pivot
- Current club: RK Eurofarm Pelister
- Number: 10

Senior clubs
- Years: Team
- 2013–2020: Wisła Płock
- 2020–2021: Abanca Ademar León
- 2021–2022: Dinamo Viktor Stavropol
- 2022–2023: TV Emsdetten
- 2023: Beşiktaş
- 2024: RK Eurofarm Pelister
- 2024–: AHC Potaissa Turda
National team
Years	Team	Apps	(Gls)
–	Poland	4	(0)

Mateusz Piechowski (born 1 March 1995) is a Polish handball player who plays for AHC Potaissa Turda and the Polish national team.

He was chosen to participate at the 2016 Summer Olympics in Rio de Janeiro, in the men's handball tournament, but failed to make it to the final squad.

== Honours ==
- RK Eurofarm Pelister (North Macedonia)
- Macedonian Handball Super League

Winner Gold:2024
