= TV Emsdetten =

German team handball club

- Full name: TV Emsdetten Marketing GmbH
- Founded: 1898; 128 years ago
- Arena: Ems-Halle
- Capacity: 2,200
- President: Heike Schürkötter; Frank Wiesner
- Head coach: Sascha Bertow
- League: 3. Liga
- 2024–25: 2nd
- Club colours
Home	Away

TV Emsdetten is a handball club from Emsdetten, Germany. Currently, they compete in the 3. Liga. They were relegated from the 2nd Handball-Bundesliga in 2020-21. In the 2013-14 season they played in the Handball-Bundesliga, but were relegated when they finished last.

== Accomplishments ==
- 2. Handball-Bundesliga: 1
  - Silver: 2013

== Team ==
=== Current squad ===
Squad for the 2022–23 season

Goalkeepers

- 16 (Croatia) Ante Vukas
- 21 (Germany) Oliver Krechel

Left wingers

- 14 (Germany) Paul Kolk
- 22 (Germany) Dirk Holzner

Right wingers

- 7 (Germany) Yannick Terhaer
- 9 (Germany) Tobias Reichmann

Line players

- 6 (Poland) Mateusz Piechowski
- 11 (Germany) Jakob Schwabe
- 35 (Germany) Marius Kluwe

Left backs

- 13 (Germany) Ole Schramm
- 23 (Netherlands) Robin Jansen
- 24 (Germany) Lutz Weßeling
- 66 (Netherlands) Brent Riksten

Centre backs

- 8 (Germany) Bjarne Budelmann
- 17 (Germany) Marcel Schliedermann
- 34 (Iceland) Anton Rúnarsson

Right backs

- 89 (Germany) Gabor Langhans
- 99 (Germany) Maximilian Nowatzki

=== Transfers ===
Transfers for the 2026–27 season

Joining

- (Germany) Niclas Heitkamp (LB) from (Germany) GWD Minden
- (Germany) Björn Zintel (CB) from (Germany) HSG Nordhorn-Lingen
- (Germany) Jaris Tobeler (RB) from (Germany) HSG Nordhorn-Lingen

Leaving

- (Germany) Luca Klein (CB) to (Germany) Ahlener SG

=== Transfer History ===
Transfers for the 2025–26 season

Joining

- (Russia) Sergey Gorpishin (LP) from (Germany) 1. VfL Potsdam
- (Austria) Eric Damböck (LW) from (Switzerland) HSC Kreuzlingen

Leaving

- (Germany) René Zobel (RB) to (Germany) TSG Friesenheim

Transfers for the 2022–23 season

Joining

- (Croatia) Ante Vukas (GK) from (Germany) SGSH DRAGONS
- (Germany) Lutz Weßeling (LB) from (Germany) TSG Altenhagen-Heepen
- (Germany) Bjarne Budelmann (CB) from (Germany) ATSV Habenhausen
- (Germany) Tobias Reichmann (RW) from (Germany) MT Melsungen
- (Germany) Marius Kluwe (LP) from (Germany) TV Bissendorf-Holte
- (Poland) Mateusz Piechowski (LP)

Leaving

- (Germany) Maurice Paske (GK) to (Germany) VfL Eintracht Hagen
- (North Macedonia) Darko Dimitrievski (LB) to (Spain) Recoletas Atlético Valladolid
- (Iceland) Örn Vésteinsson Östenberg (LB) to (Norway) Haslum HK
- (Croatia) Josip Vekić (RB)
- (Croatia) Rene Mihaljević (LP) to (Germany) TuS Ferndorf
- (Germany) Frederic Stüber (LP) to (Germany) VfL Eintracht Hagen

== Notable former players ==
- (Germany) Rudolf Rauer
