= Tim Nothdurft =

German handball player (born 1997)

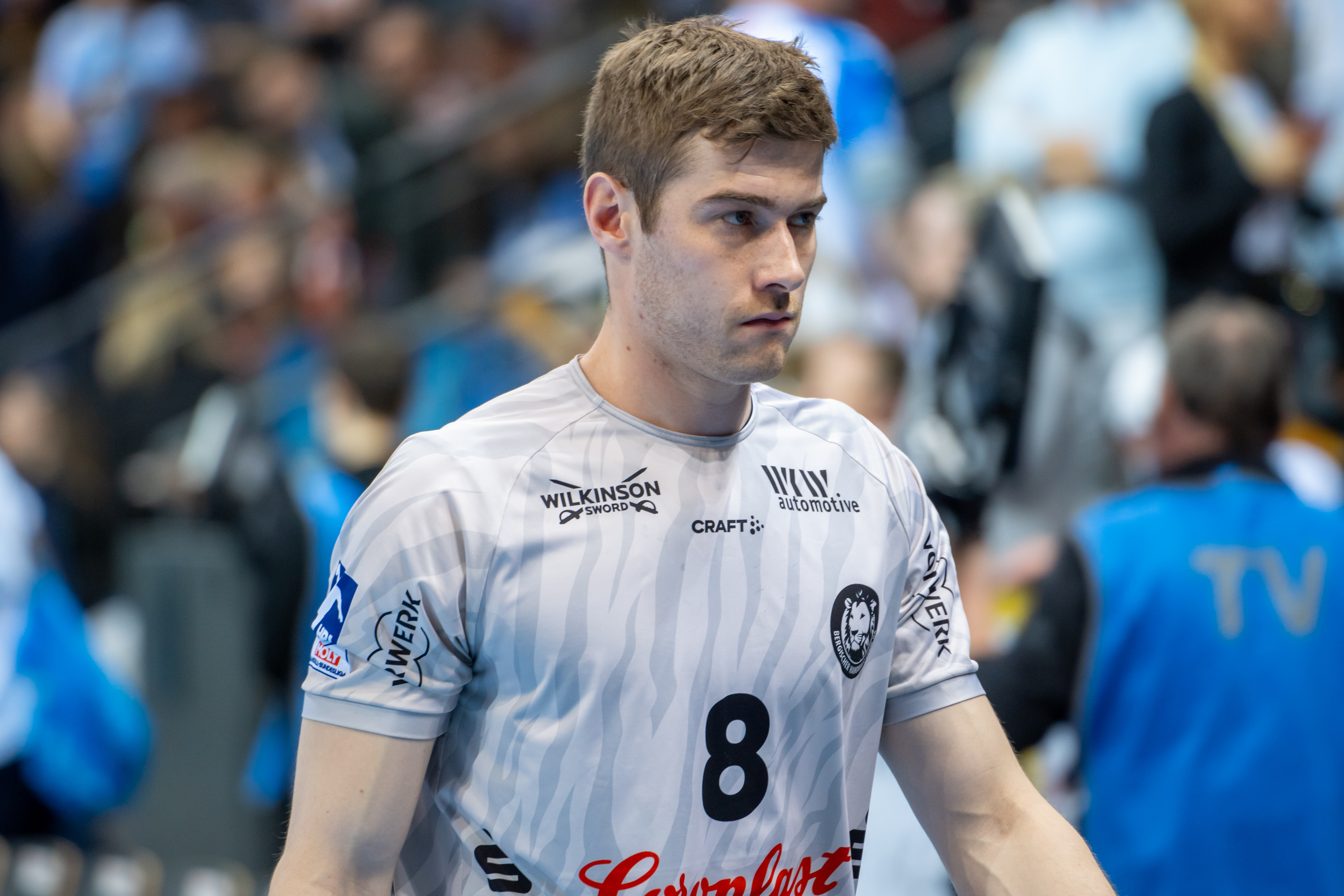
- Tim Nothdurft (2024)

Personal information
- Full name: Tim Nothdurft
- Born: 11 July 1997 (age 29) Reutlingen, Germany
- Height: 1.94 m (6 ft 4 in)

Sport
- Sport: Handball
- Position: Left wing
- Current club: Rhein-Neckar Löwen
- Number: 8

Youth career
- Years: Team
- –2016: HBW Balingen-Weilstetten

Senior clubs
- Years: Team
- 2016–2022: HBW Balingen-Weilstetten
- 2022–2024: Bergischer HC
- 2024–: Rhein-Neckar Löwen
National team
Years	Team	Apps	(Gls)
2023–	Germany	2	(1)
- Updated on 6 March 2025

Tim Nothdurft (born 11 July 1997) is a German handball player for Rhein-Neckar Löwen and the German national team.

== Career ==
At HBW Balingen-Weilstetten, he was a stand-out player in the 2020–21 season, scoring 119 goals. Nothdurft made his debut for the national team against Egypt on the 3rd of November, 2023. The following month, it was announced he would join Rhein-Neckar Löwen. He was selected to represent Germany at the 2024 European Men's Handball Championship, however he made no appearances and the host nation was defeated by Sweden in the bronze medal match.
