= 2022–23 Handball-Bundesliga =

Handball-Bundesliga
- Season: 2022–23
- Dates: 1 September 2022 – 11 June 2023
- Champions: THW Kiel
- Relegated: GWD Minden; ASV Hamm-Westfalen
- EHF Champions League: THW Kiel; SC Magdeburg
- EHF European League: Füchse Berlin; SG Flensburg-Handewitt; Rhein Neckar-Löwen; TSV Hannover-Burgdorf
- Matches: 306
- Goals: 18,040 (58.95 per match)
- Best player: Gísli Þorgeir Kristjánsson
- Top goalscorer: Casper Ulrich Mortensen (234 goals)
- Attendance: 1,486,735 (4,859 per match)

The 2022–23 Handball-Bundesliga was the 58th season of the Handball-Bundesliga, Germany's premier handball league and the 46th season consisting of only one league. It ran from 1 September 2022 to 11 June 2023.

THW Kiel won their 23rd title.

== Teams ==
Locations of the 2022–23 Handball-Bundesliga teams

=== Team changes ===
Promoted from 2021–22 2. Handball-Bundesliga	Relegated from 2021–22 Handball-Bundesliga
VfL Gummersbach; ASV Hamm-Westfalen	HBW Balingen-Weilstetten; TuS Nettelstedt-Lübbecke

=== Stadiums ===
Team	Location	Arena	Capacity
Bergischer HC	Wuppertal; Solingen; Düsseldorf	Uni-Halle; Klingenhalle; Mitsubishi Electric Halle; PSD Bank Dome	3,200; 2,800; 4,500; 12,500
Füchse Berlin	Berlin	Max-Schmeling-Halle	9,000
TVB 1898 Stuttgart	Stuttgart	Porsche-Arena	6,211
HC Erlangen	Nuremberg	Arena Nürnberger Versicherung	8,308
SG Flensburg-Handewitt	Flensburg	Flens-Arena	6,300
VfL Gummersbach	Gummersbach	Schwalbe-Arena	4,132
Frisch Auf Göppingen	Göppingen	EWS Arena	5,600
HSV Hamburg	Hamburg	Alsterdorfer Sporthalle	7,000
ASV Hamm-Westfalen	Hamm	Westpress Arena	2,650
TSV Hannover-Burgdorf	Hanover	ZAG-Arena	9,850
THW Kiel	Kiel	Wunderino Arena	10,285
SC DHfK Leipzig	Leipzig	Quarterback Immobilien Arena	6,327
TBV Lemgo	Lemgo	Phoenix Contact Arena	4,790
SC Magdeburg	Magdeburg	GETEC Arena	6,600
MT Melsungen	Kassel	Rothenbach-Halle	4,500
GWD Minden	Minden	Kampa-Halle	4,059
Rhein-Neckar Löwen	Mannheim	SAP Arena	13,200
HSG Wetzlar	Wetzlar	Buderus Arena Wetzlar	4,421

== Standings ==
Pos	Team	Pld	W	D	L	GF	GA	GD	Pts	Qualification or relegation
1	THW Kiel (C)	34	29	1	4	1098	917	+181	59	Champions League
2	SC Magdeburg	34	27	3	4	1124	982	+142	57	Champions League
3	Füchse Berlin	34	25	1	8	1103	990	+113	51	EHF European League
4	SG Flensburg-Handewitt	34	23	3	8	1062	929	+133	49	EHF European League
5	Rhein-Neckar Löwen	34	22	1	11	1133	1025	+108	45	EHF European League
6	TSV Hannover-Burgdorf	34	18	2	14	994	978	+16	38	EHF European League
7	HSV Hamburg	34	17	2	15	1028	1010	+18	36	
8	TBV Lemgo	34	16	3	15	1013	1010	+3	35	
9	MT Melsungen	34	14	6	14	910	923	−13	34	
10	VfL Gummersbach	34	15	3	16	1036	1038	−2	33	
11	SC DHfK Leipzig	34	14	3	17	999	1013	−14	31	
12	Bergischer HC	34	14	2	18	955	997	−42	30	
13	HC Erlangen	34	14	2	18	1009	1061	−52	30	
14	Frisch Auf Göppingen	34	9	5	20	955	989	−34	23	
15	TVB 1898 Stuttgart	34	10	3	21	912	1003	−91	23	
16	HSG Wetzlar	34	8	1	25	886	991	−105	17	
17	GWD Minden (R)	34	5	3	26	932	1093	−161	13	Relegated to 2. Handball-Bundesliga
18	ASV Hamm-Westfalen (R)	34	3	2	29	891	1091	−200	8	Relegated to 2. Handball-Bundesliga

Source: HBL
Rules for classification: 1) points; 2) goal difference; 3) goals scored; 4) head-to-head points; 5) head-to-head goal difference; 6) head-to-head number of goals scored.
(C) Champions; (R) Relegated

== Results ==
Home \ Away	BRG	BER	BIT	ERL	FLE	GÖP	GUM	HAM	HMW	HAN	KIE	LEI	LEM	MAG	MEL	MIN	RNL	WET
Bergischer HC	—	34–30	25–26	29–30	18–31	28–26	30–30	37–34	34–24	22–23	25–29	32–28	32–28	34–38	28–27	34–32	26–27	24–23
Füchse Berlin	29–27	—	31–21	39–30	37–33	34–27	38–33	36–32	37–26	32–30	34–26	28–22	32–26	31–32	35–25	42–35	38–24	29–25
TVB 1898 Stuttgart	27–26	32–28	—	27–29	30–32	24–24	31–30	22–28	29–20	31–34	30–37	26–33	32–28	28–32	23–26	27–23	30–43	28–30
HC Erlangen	30–27	28–30	31–28	—	28–33	34–28	31–37	35–29	37–27	33–29	27–34	36–32	31–31	23–38	34–34	29–28	30–33	31–27
SG Flensburg-Handewitt	30–17	31–31	29–25	31–28	—	27–24	31–26	34–32	37–23	30–35	36–23	30–27	34–27	35–34	37–25	36–23	34–31	34–24
Frisch Auf Göppingen	37–28	25–19	24–25	31–25	27–27	—	29–28	26–26	39–32	33–29	27–34	34–30	34–31	26–31	23–29	26–29	25–27	26–28
VfL Gummersbach	37–34	28–30	29–24	32–31	31–29	35–32	—	31–30	29–28	27–34	26–30	36–36	28–29	28–30	31–23	26–22	29–32	37–30
HSV Hamburg	33–23	28–37	27–27	33–29	30–31	31–28	34–31	—	32–25	32–26	30–34	28–31	28–32	28–30	33–28	27–21	40–37	24–21
ASV Hamm-Westfalen	27–31	29–32	27–27	29–32	29–37	32–28	22–21	27–34	—	29–29	24–37	28–33	25–30	27–36	18–28	31–26	30–35	23–29
TSV Hannover-Burgdorf	30–32	32–33	27–22	29–28	25–35	28–24	28–27	28–27	30–26	—	27–29	25–22	29–25	34–31	26–26	32–18	30–31	23–26
THW Kiel	35–29	36–29	36–23	35–26	29–19	30–26	31–28	40–28	40–29	33–23	—	31–34	32–33	34–34	24–22	36–29	32–29	38–23
SC DHfK Leipzig	27–32	26–31	25–30	32–29	31–30	25–26	30–34	22–23	33–23	29–31	22–32	—	30–22	33–32	40–33	31–31	37–29	38–29
TBV Lemgo	38–28	35–32	29–24	34–27	26–21	36–33	26–30	28–32	30–25	35–30	22–28	29–29	—	28–34	28–28	30–27	33–30	34–29
SC Magdeburg	23–21	34–29	31–27	31–28	30–28	33–29	41–29	32–28	31–23	31–30	33–34	32–24	37–33	—	27–23	39–25	32–32	32–28
MT Melsungen	22–22	29–32	33–26	31–18	25–25	26–23	28–22	30–27	30–29	28–31	19–23	28–29	20–19	27–27	—	31–28	25–34	21–19
GWD Minden	25–28	32–27	23–29	25–32	27–41	27–27	38–38	31–35	32–23	34–35	18–34	28–29	36–35	30–44	21–28	—	29–40	26–29
Rhein-Neckar Löwen	39–29	32–34	41–27	40–23	28–27	36–33	37–42	32–35	37–27	32–31	27–31	30–24	37–28	35–37	36–25	37–25	—	34–24
HSG Wetzlar	22–28	25–37	32–24	28–35	22–27	25–25	29–30	28–30	29–24	24–31	25–31	24–25	26–24	30–35	25–27	25–27	23–29	—

Source: HBL
Legend: Blue = home team win; Yellow = draw; Red = away team win.

== Top goalscorers ==
Rank	Player	Club	Goals	Shots	%
1	(Denmark) Casper Ulrich Mortensen	HSV Hamburg	229	336	70
2	(Germany) Juri Knorr	Rhein-Neckar Löwen	208	319	65
3	(Germany) Lukas Blohme	VfL Gummersbach	179	250	72
4	(Netherlands) Kay Smits	SC Magdeburg	174	249	70
5	(Denmark) Emil Jakobsen	SG Flensburg-Handewitt	166	220	75
5	(Germany) Christoph Steinert	HC Erlangen	166	249	67
7	(Switzerland) Lenny Rubin	HSG Wetzlar	149	278	54
8	(Denmark) Hans Lindberg	Füchse Berlin	147	187	79
8	(Iceland) Gísli Þorgeir Kristjánsson	SC Magdeburg	147	210	70
10	(Germany) Samuel Zehnder	TBV Lemgo	146	193	76

== Awards ==
Award	Player	Club
Most valuable player	(Iceland) Gísli Þorgeir Kristjánsson	SC Magdeburg
Coach of the season	(Iceland) Guðjón Valur Sigurðsson	VfL Gummersbach
Young players of the season	(Germany) Julian Bauer	SC Magdeburg
