= Rhein-Neckar Löwen =

German professional handball club

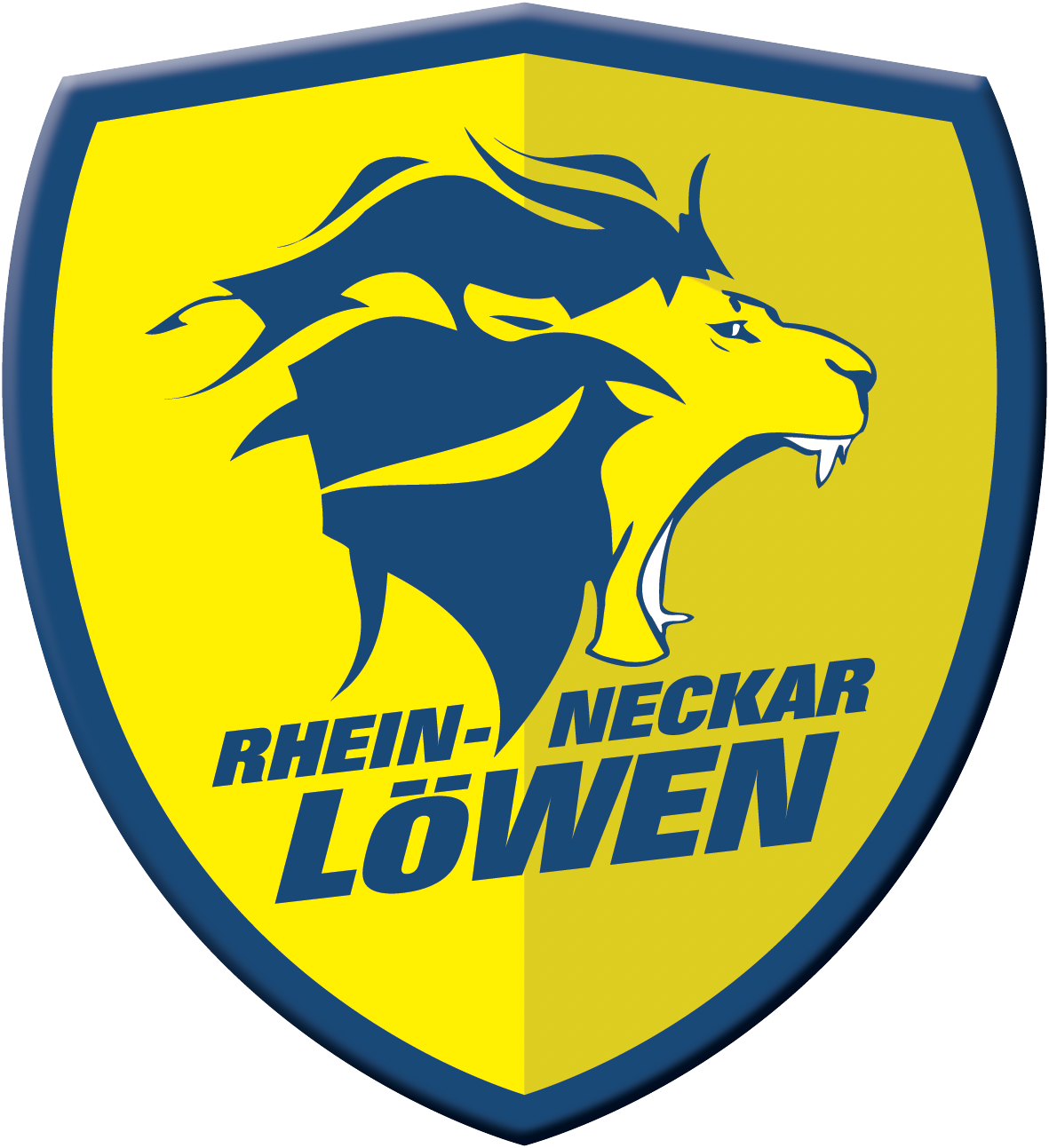
- Full name: Rhein-Neckar Löwen
- Nickname: Die Löwen / The Lions
- Short name: RNL
- Founded: 2002; 24 years ago
- Arena: SAP Arena, Mannheim
- Capacity: 14,500
- President: Jennifer Kettemann
- Head coach: Sebastian Hinze
- League: Handball-Bundesliga
- 2025–26: 8th of 18
- Club colours
Home	Away

Rhein-Neckar Löwen is a professional handball club founded in 2002, based in Mannheim, Germany. The club competes in the German Handball-Bundesliga and continentally in EHF European League. Rhein-Neckar Löwen play their home games in SAP Arena, with a seating capacity of 14,500.

The club won the German championship twice under the leadership of Nikolaj Jacobsen, in 2016 and in 2017.

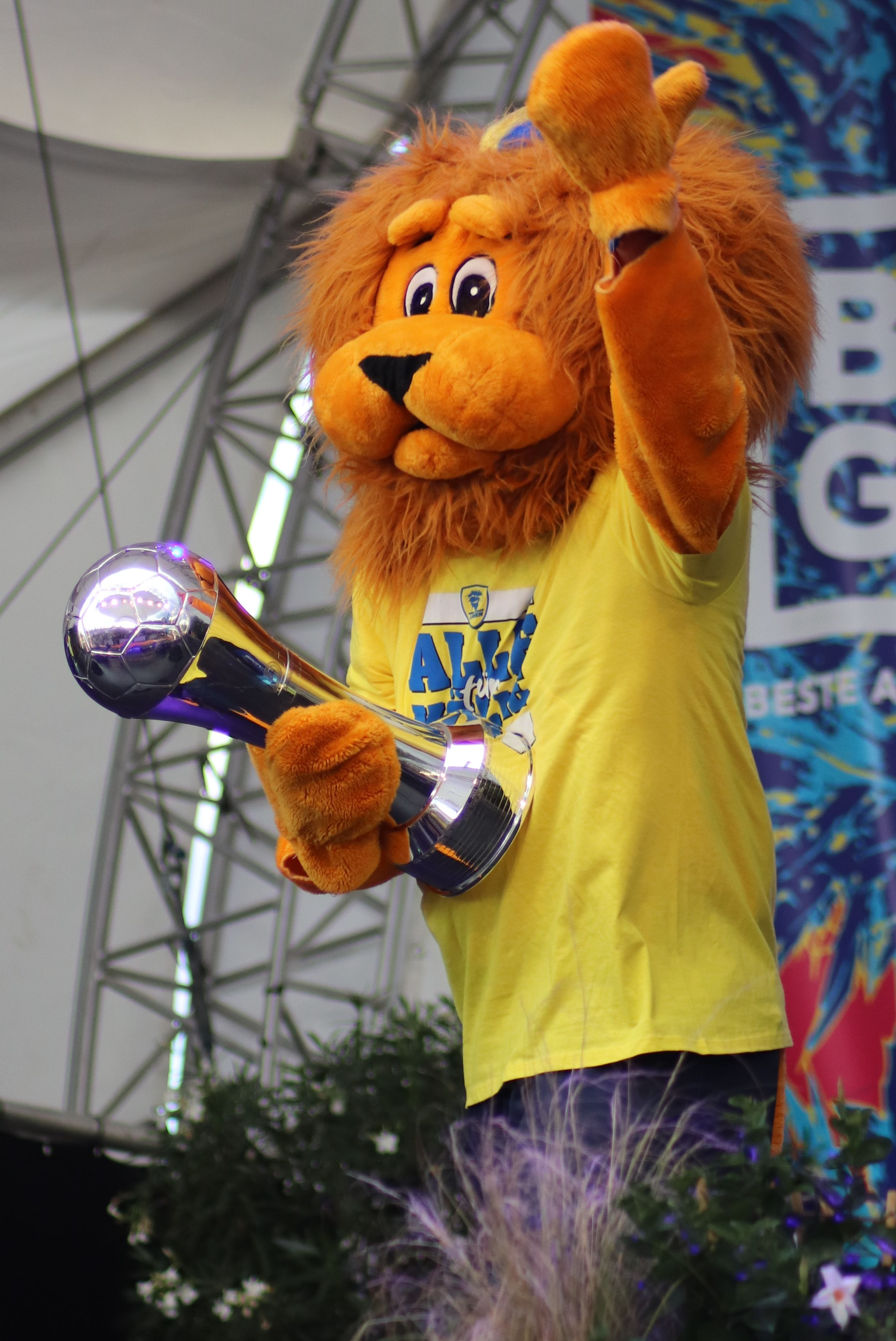
Conny – the official mascot of Rhein-Neckar Löwen.

== History ==
On 1 July 2002, the club was founded, originally named SG Kronau/Östringen, following a merger between two clubs, TSG Kronau and TSV Baden Östringen. Their home ground was Rhein-Neckar-Halle. In their first season, 2002–03, the club succeeded to achieve promoting from the 2. Bundesliga to the top tier of the German handball, the Handball-Bundesliga. A season after, in 2003–04, they were relegated from the 16th position, but they returned again to the first Bundesliga in 2004–05 season, after finishing the season in the 2nd place of the 2. Bundesliga. In 2005–06 season, SG Kronau/Östringen home games were moved from the old Rhein-Neckar-Halle to the newly built SAP Arena in Mannheim. In this season, they reached the final of DHB Cup. They lost 25–26 to HSV Hamburg, and finished 6th in the Handball-Bundesliga. In the following season, they lost again in DHB Cup final, with a 33–31 to THW Kiel, and finished 8th in the Handball-Bundesliga.

In the beginning of 2007–08 season, the club's name renamed to Rhein-Neckar Löwen. This season, they lost in the final of EHF Cup Winners' Cup to MKB Veszprém. The Hungarians secured the title after a 60:65 win on aggregate over Rhein-Neckar Löwen. In this season, Löwen's youth team won the German championship for the first time in the history of the club. The 2008–09 season was Rhein-Neckar Löwen's best season by then, finishing 3rd in Bundesliga, and reaching the semi-final of EHF Champions League, in their first time in this competition. In 2009–10, Rhein-Neckar Löwen reached the German Cup final again. It was their third appearance in the cup final, but again they finished as runners-up, this time after a 33–34 loss to HSV Hamburg.

The club won its first title on 19 May 2013, after beating HBC Nantes (26–24) in the Final Four of EHF Cup, on its first year as EHF Cup, a merge between EHF European Cup and EHF Cup Winners' Cup.

In 2013–14, Rhein-Neckar Löwen reached the DHB Cup Final Four for the seventh time in its history, but defeated by SG Flensburg (26–30) in the semi-final. In the EHF Champions League, Löwen reached the quarterfinals, and won FC Barcelona (38–31) at home, but in Palau Blaugrana they lost, 24–31, and were eliminated from EHF Champions League because of the away goals. In the Bundesliga, Löwen headed to the final game of the season as table leaders, with the same total of points like THW Kiel. Although they won VfL Gummersbach (40–35), they lost the championship to THW Kiel, who won Füchse Berlin, with a better result, 37–23. THW Kiel finished the season with a better goals difference and won the championship. Löwen finished only second.

A season after, in 2014–15, Rhein-Neckar Löwen appointed Nikolaj Jacobsen as their new head coach. He led Löwen again to the second place, and they finished as runners-up to THW Kiel for the second season in a row. But in 2015–16, Jacobsen was the first head coach to lead Löwen to a national championship, as they beat SG Flensburg by a one point. They also won the DHB-Supercup after a 27–24 win over SC Magdeburg. A season after, in 2016–17, they defended the title and achieved their second Bundesliga championship in their history. On September 12th, 2014 the team broke the world record for most spectators at a handball match with 44,189 spectators in a match against HSV Hamburg.

=== Kits ===
AWAY

2020–21

== Accomplishments ==
- Handball-Bundesliga:
  - Gold: 2016, 2017
- DHB-Pokal:
  - Gold: 2018, 2023
- DHB-Supercup:
  - Gold: 2016, 2017, 2018
- EHF Cup:
  - Gold: 2013

== Team ==
Squad for the 2026–27 season

Goalkeepers

- 20 (Denmark) Mike Jensen
- 29 (Germany) David Späth

Left wingers

- 8 (Germany) Tim Nothdurft
- 11 (Switzerland) Niclas Mierzwa

Right wingers

- 14 (Switzerland) Gino Steenaerts
- 19 (Germany) Marius Steinhauser

Line players

- 21 (Germany) Aron Seesing
- 41 (Germany) Elias Ciudad Benitez
- 80 (Germany) Jannik Kohlbacher

Left backs

- 7 (Germany) Robert Timmermeister
- 45 (Croatia) Halil Jaganjac

Central backs

- 25 (Iceland) Haukur Þrastarson
- 35 (France) Kentin Mahé
- 77 (Netherlands) Dani Baijens

Right backs

- 9 (Denmark) Jacob Lassen
- 78 (Sweden) Edwin Aspenbäck

=== Transfers ===
Transfers for the 2026–27 season

Joining

- (France) Kentin Mahé (CB) from (Germany) VfL Gummersbach
- (Denmark) Jacob Lassen (RB) from (Germany) HSV Hamburg
- (Switzerland) Niclas Mierzwa (LW) from (Switzerland) Pfadi Winterthur
- (Germany) Aron Seesing (LP) from (Germany) Bergischer HC
- (Germany) Marius Steinhauser (RW) from (Germany) TSV Hannover-Burgdorf

Leaving

- (Sweden) Lukas Sandell (RB) to (Hungary) OTP Bank-Pick Szeged
- (Denmark) Steven Plucnar (LP) to (Denmark) GOG Håndbold
- (Denmark) Mathias Larson (CB) to (Germany) SG BBM Bietigheim
- (Germany) Patrick Groetzki (RW) (retires)
- (Germany) Sebastian Heymann (LB) to (Germany) TSV Hannover-Burgdorf
- (Germany) David Móré (LW) to (Germany) ThSV Eisenach

Transfers for the 2027–28 season

Joining

- (Iceland) Elvar Örn Jónsson (LB) from (Germany) SC Magdeburg

Leaving

=== Transfer History ===
Transfers for the 2025–26 season

Joining

- (Sweden) Lukas Sandell (RB) from (Hungary) ONE Veszprém
- (Sweden) Edwin Aspenbäck (RB) from (Denmark) TTH Holstebro
- (Switzerland) Gino Steenaerts (RW) from (Switzerland) HC Kriens-Luzern
- (Denmark) Mathias Larson (CB) from (Norway) Elverum Håndball
- (Denmark) Mike Jensen (GK) from (Hungary) ONE Veszprém
- (Croatia) Halil Jaganjac (LB) (from (Poland) Industria Kielce)
- (Iceland) Haukur Þrastarson (CB) from (Romania) Dinamo București
- (Netherlands) Dani Baijens (CB) (from (France) Paris Saint-Germain)
- (Germany) Robert Timmermeister (LB) back from loan at (Germany) HBW Balingen-Weilstetten
- (Germany) Magnus Grupe (CB) back from loan at (Germany) TSG Friesenheim

Leaving

- (Croatia) Ivan Martinović (RB) to (Hungary) ONE Veszprém
- (Sweden) Mikael Appelgren (GK) to (Hungary) ONE Veszprém
- (Sweden) Olle Forsell Schefvert (LB) to (Germany) MT Melsungen
- (Croatia) Halil Jaganjac (LB) (end of loan (Poland) Industria Kielce)
- (Sweden) Gustav Davidsson (LB) to (Sweden) Hammarby IF Handboll
- (Denmark) Jon Andersen (RB) to (Denmark) Skjern Håndbold
- (Germany) Juri Knorr (CB) to (Denmark) Aalborg Håndbold
- (Germany) Magnus Grupe (CB) to (Germany) HBW Balingen-Weilstetten
- (Germany) Valentin Willner (LP) to (Germany) TUSEM Essen
- (Germany) Cedric Mayer (RW) (to (Germany) HC Oppenweiler/Backnang)
- (Germany) Niklas Michalski (RW) (to (Germany) HSG Krefeld)

=== Notable former players ===
- (Germany) Uwe Gensheimer (2003–2016,2019–2024)
- (Germany) Henning Fritz (2007–2012)
- (Germany) Christian Schwarzer (2007–2009)
- (Germany) Michael Haaß (2006–2007)
- (Germany) Oliver Roggisch (2007–2014)
- (Germany) Christian Zeitz (2002–2003)
- (Germany) Michael Müller (2009–2012)
- (Germany) Stefan Kneer (2014–2016)
- (Germany) Hendrik Pekeler (2015–2018)
- (Germany) Steffen Fäth (2018–2020)
- (Germany) Marius Steinhauser (2012–2017)
- (Germany) Juri Knorr (2021–2025)
- (Germany) Nikolas Katsigiannis (2020–2022)
- (Sweden) Mikael Appelgren (2015–2025)
- (Sweden) Kim Ekdahl du Rietz (2012–2018, 2021)
- (Sweden) Tomas Svensson (2011–2012)
- (Sweden) Andreas Palicka (2016–2021)
- (Sweden) Albin Lagergren (2020–2023)
- (Sweden) Jesper Nielsen (2018–2021)
- (Sweden) Jerry Tollbring (2017–2021)
- (Sweden) Lukas Nilsson (2020–2023)
- (Sweden) Olle Forsell Schefvert (2022–2025)
- (Iceland) Ólafur Stefánsson (2009–2011)
- (Iceland) Róbert Gunnarsson (2010–2012)
- (Iceland) Guðjón Valur Sigurðsson (2008–2011, 2016–2019)
- (Iceland) Stefán Rafn Sigurmannsson (2012–2016)
- (Iceland) Alexander Petersson (2012–2021)
- (Iceland) Snorri Guðjónsson (2009–2010)
- (Iceland) Ýmir Örn Gíslason (2020–2024)
- (Poland) Mariusz Jurasik (2003–2009)
- (Poland) Sławomir Szmal (2005–2010)
- (Poland) Karol Bielecki (2007–2012)
- (Poland) Krzysztof Lijewski (2011–2012)
- (Serbia) Žarko Šešum (2010–2014)
- (Serbia) Darko Stanić (2015)
- (Serbia) Bogdan Radivojević (2017–2019)
- (Serbia) Ilija Abutović (2018–2022)
- (Norway) Børge Lund (2010–2012)
- (Norway) Bjarte Myrhol (2009–2015)
- (Norway) Harald Reinkind (2014–2018)
- (Denmark) Niklas Landin Jacobsen (2012–2015)
- (Denmark) Mads Mensah Larsen (2014–2020)
- (Denmark) Niclas Kirkeløkke (2019–2024)
- (Spain) Gedeón Guardiola (2014–2020)
- (Spain) Isaías Guardiola (2012–2014)
- (Spain) Rafael Baena González (2015–2018, 2020)
- (North Macedonia) Borko Ristovski (2015–2016)
- (North Macedonia) Dejan Manaskov (2016–2017)
- (North Macedonia) Filip Taleski (2017–2019)
- (Slovakia) Richard Štochl (2015)
- (Slovakia) Maroš Kolpak (1997–2007)
- (Russia) Dmitri Torgovanov (2005–2007)
- (Russia) Sergei Gorbok (2007–2010, 2013–2014)
- (France) Jackson Richardson (2009)
- (France) Romain Lagarde (2019–2021)
- (Hungary) Gábor Ancsin (2009–2011)
- (Hungary) Dániel Buday (2007–2008)
- (Switzerland) Andy Schmid (2010–2022)
- (Croatia) Ivan Čupić (2010–2012)
- (Czech Republic) Jan Filip (2008–2009)
- (Estonia) Mait Patrail (2020–2022)
- (Belarus) (Germany) Andrej Klimovets (2005–2010)
- (Ukraine) (Germany) Oleg Velyky (2005–2008)

=== Notable former coaches ===
- (Denmark) Nikolaj Jacobsen
- (Germany) Michael Roth
- (Germany) Christian Schwarzer
- (France) Frédéric Volle
- (Belarus) Yuri Shevtsov
- (Sweden) Ola Lindgren
- (Iceland) Guðmundur Guðmundsson
