= 2009–10 Handball-Bundesliga =

Handball-Bundesliga
- Season: 2009–10
- Dates: 2 September 2009 - 5 June 2010
- Champions: THW Kiel
- Relegated: HSG Düsseldorf; GWD Minden
- Champions League: HSV Hamburg; SG Flensburg-Handewitt; Rhein-Neckar Löwen
- EHF Cup: Frisch Auf Göppingen; TBV Lemgo; TV Großwallstadt
- Cup Winners Cup: VfL Gummersbach
- Matches: 308; 306 regular season + 2 relegation games
- Goals: 17,328 (56.26 per match)
- Top goalscorer: Hans Lindberg (HSV Hamburg) (251 goals)
- Total attendance: 1,443,708
- Average attendance: 4,718

The 2009–10 Handball-Bundesliga is the 45th season of the Handball-Bundesliga, Germany's premier handball league.

== League table ==
Pos	Team	Pld	W	D	L	G	GD	Pts
1.	THW Kiel (C, Cup)	34	30	2	2	1135 : 865	+ 270	62 : 6
2.	HSV Hamburg	34	30	1	3	1125 : 911	+ 214	61 : 7
3.	SG Flensburg-Handewitt	34	27	0	7	1026 : 887	+ 139	54 : 14
4.	Rhein-Neckar Löwen	34	24	1	9	1047 : 923	+ 124	49 : 19
5.	VfL Gummersbach	34	22	3	9	999 : 921	+ 78	47 : 21
6.	Frisch Auf Göppingen	34	22	2	10	1001 : 985	+ 16	46 : 22
7.	TBV Lemgo	34	20	2	12	981 : 914	+ 67	42 : 26
8.	TV Grosswallstadt	34	18	4	12	925 : 890	+ 35	40 : 28
9.	Füchse Berlin	34	20	0	14	977 : 943	+ 34	40 : 28
10.	TuS Nettelstedt-Lübbecke (P)	34	11	4	19	949 : 964	− 15	26 : 42
11.	SC Magdeburg	34	12	1	21	957 : 1016	− 59	25 : 43
12.	MT Melsungen	34	11	1	22	952 : 1046	− 94	23 : 45
13.	HSG Wetzlar	34	11	1	22	879 : 987	− 108	23 : 45
14.	TSV Hannover-Burgdorf (P)	34	9	2	23	880 : 1011	− 131	20 : 48
15.	HBW Balingen-Weilstetten	34	9	0	25	889 : 971	− 82	18 : 50
16.	TSV Dormagen	34	6	2	26	891 : 1058	− 167	14 : 54
17.	HSG Düsseldorf (P)	34	5	2	27	868 : 1032	− 164	12 : 56
18.	GWD Minden	34	2	6	26	847 : 1004	− 157	10 : 58

=== Key ===
	Champion/Qualification for EHF Champions League
	Qualification for EHF Champions League
	Qualification for EHF Champions League Play-Offs
	Qualification for EHF Cup
	Qualification for EHF Cup Winners' Cup
	Relegation Play-Off 2. Handball-Bundesliga
	Relegation to 2. Handball-Bundesliga
(C)	Holding Champions
(Cup)	Holding Cupwinners
(PO)	Play-Off Winner
(P)	Promoted
