= 2017–18 DHB-Pokal =

The 2017–18 DHB-Pokal was the 42nd edition of the tournament.

The Rhein-Neckar Löwen won their first title after a 30–26 finals win over TSV Hannover-Burgdorf.

== Format ==
The first round was split in a north and a south part and played in mini tournaments where only the winner advanced to the round of 16. From there on a knockout system was used to determine the winner. The final four was played on one weekend in Hamburg.

== Round 1 ==
The draw was held on 20 June 2017. Games were played on 19 and 20 August 2017.

Team 1	Score	Team 2
North
Played in Hildesheim
HSV Norderstedt	cancelled	Leichlinger TV
TSV Hannover-Burgdorf	26–24	TuS Nettelstedt-Lübbecke
Leichlinger TV	22–35	TSV Hannover-Burgdorf
Played in Düsseldorf
OHV Aurich	23–37	Wilhelmshavener HV
HC Rhein Vikings	20–33	SC Magdeburg
Wilhelmshavener HV	26–33	SC Magdeburg
Played in Hildesheim
TBV Lemgo	33–24	Eintracht Baunatal
Eintracht Hildesheim	24–21	TUSEM Essen
TBV Lemgo	37–26	Eintracht Hildesheim
Played in Altenholz
VfL Lübeck-Schwartau	18–37	SG Flensburg-Handewitt
TSV Altenholz	37–35	TSV Bayer Dormagen
SG Flensburg-Handewitt	36–25	TSV Altenholz
Played in Springe
HC Empor Rostock	15–30	HSG Nordhorn-Lingen
Füchse Berlin	29–16	HF Springe
HSG Nordhorn-Lingen	31–34 (OT)	Füchse Berlin
Played in Spenge
Dessau-Rosslauer HV	35–24	1. VfL Potsdam
TuS Spenge	19–36	THW Kiel
Dessau-Rosslauer HV	23–36	THW Kiel
Played in Minden
TuS Ferndorf	23–22	GWD Minden
Oranienburger HC	24–36	TV Emsdetten
TuS Ferndorf	29–23	TV Emsdetten
Played in Hagen
Handball Sport Verein Hamburg	32–33 (OT)	ASV Hamm-Westfalen
SC DHfK Leipzig	29–27	VfL Eintracht Hagen
ASV Hamm-Westfalen	24–37	SC DHfK Leipzig
South
Played in Heilbronn-Horkheim
DJK Rimpar Wölfe	39–32	HSG Rodgau Nieder-Roden
Frisch Auf Göppingen	45–26	TSB Heilbronn-Horkheim
DJK Rimpar Wölfe	28–31	Frisch Auf Göppingen
Played in Nußloch
SG BBM Bietigheim	34–26	Longericher SC Köln
SG Nußloch	24–42	HC Erlangen
SG BBM Bietigheim	19–33	HC Erlangen
Played in Pforzheim
SG Leutershausen	25–34	Bergischer HC
TV Hüttenberg	30–22	TGS Pforzheim
Bergischer HC	26–22	TV Hüttenberg
Played in Großwallstadt
TV Großwallstadt	30–31 (Pen.)	HG Saarlouis
VfL Gummersbach	30–27	HSC 2000 Coburg
HG Saarlouis	28–27	VfL Gummersbach
Played in Darmstadt
ThSV Eisenach	31–20	MSG Groß-Bieberau/Modau
Rhein-Neckar Löwen	41–28	HBW Balingen-Weilstetten
ThSV Eisenach	30–42	Rhein-Neckar Löwen
Played in Köndringen/Teningen
SG Köndringen/Teningen	26–31	HC Elbflorenz 2006 Dresden
HSG Wetzlar	31–29	HSG Konstanz
HC Elbflorenz 2006 Dresden	23–35	HSG Wetzlar
Played in Oftersheim/Schwetzingen
MT Melsungen	40–22	TV 1893 Neuhausen
HG Oftersheim/Schwetzingen	23–28	TSG Friesenheim
MT Melsungen	29–25	TSG Friesenheim
Played in Aue
TV Bittenfeld	34–11	HSV Bad Blankenburg
TV Germania Großsachsen	29–32	EHV Aue
TV Bittenfeld	38–27	EHV Aue

== Round 2 ==
The draw was held on 28 August 2017. Games were played on 17 and 18 October 2017.

Team 1	Score	Team 2
Bergischer HC	27–28	HSG Wetzlar
HC Erlangen	27–28	Frisch Auf Göppingen
TSV Hannover-Burgdorf	24–22	THW Kiel
MT Melsungen	22–27	SC DHfK Leipzig
TBV Lemgo	27–29 (OT)	TV Bittenfeld
TuS Ferndorf	24–28	Rhein-Neckar Löwen
HG Saarlouis	28–37	SC Magdeburg
SG Flensburg-Handewitt	26–29	Füchse Berlin

== Quarterfinals ==
The draw was held on 5 November 2017. Games were played from 4 to 7 March 2018.

Team 1	Score	Team 2
HSG Wetzlar	25–21	TV Bittenfeld
TSV Hannover-Burgdorf	31–30	Frisch Auf Göppingen
Rhein-Neckar Löwen	35–23	SC DHfK Leipzig
Füchse Berlin	29–30	SC Magdeburg

== Final four ==
The draw was held on 7 March 2018.

All times are local (UTC+2).

=== Bracket ===
Semifinals
5 May
SC Magdeburg	24
Rhein-Neckar Löwen	31
5 May
TSV Hannover-Burgdorf	24
HSG Wetzlar	19

Final
6 May
Rhein-Neckar Löwen	30
TSV Hannover-Burgdorf	26

=== Semifinals ===
5 May 2018; 15:15	SC Magdeburg	24–31	Rhein-Neckar Löwen	Barclaycard Arena, Hamburg; Attendance: 13,200; Referees: Behrens, Fasthoff
5 May 2018; 15:15	Weber 12	(10–16)	Mensah Larsen, Petersson 6	Barclaycard Arena, Hamburg; Attendance: 13,200; Referees: Behrens, Fasthoff
5 May 2018; 15:15	3× (yellow card)	Report	3× (yellow card) 1× (suspension)	Barclaycard Arena, Hamburg; Attendance: 13,200; Referees: Behrens, Fasthoff

5 May 2018; 18:00	TSV Hannover-Burgdorf	24–19	HSG Wetzlar	Barclaycard Arena, Hamburg; Attendance: 13,200; Referees: Helbig, Geipel
5 May 2018; 18:00	Häfner 6	(15–4)	Kohlbacher 5	Barclaycard Arena, Hamburg; Attendance: 13,200; Referees: Helbig, Geipel
5 May 2018; 18:00	5× (suspension)	Report	2× (yellow card) 2× (suspension)	Barclaycard Arena, Hamburg; Attendance: 13,200; Referees: Helbig, Geipel

=== Final ===
6 May 2018; 15:15	Rhein-Neckar Löwen	30–26	TSV Hannover-Burgdorf	Barclaycard Arena, Hamburg; Attendance: 13,200; Referees: Baumgart, Wild
6 May 2018; 15:15	Schmid 8	(13–11)	three players 6	Barclaycard Arena, Hamburg; Attendance: 13,200; Referees: Baumgart, Wild
6 May 2018; 15:15	3× (yellow card) 2× (suspension)	Report	2× (yellow card) 2× (suspension)	Barclaycard Arena, Hamburg; Attendance: 13,200; Referees: Baumgart, Wild
