= 2013–14 Handball-Bundesliga =

Handball-Bundesliga
- Season: 2013–14
- Champions: THW Kiel
- Relegated: HBW Balingen-Weilstetten; ThSV Eisenach; TV Emsdetten
- EHF Champions League: THW Kiel; Rhein-Neckar Löwen; SG Flensburg-Handewitt
- EHF Cup: HSV Hamburg; Füchse Berlin
- Matches: 306
- Goals: 17,341 (56.67 per match)
- Top goalscorer: (Serbia) Marko Vujin (242 goals)

The 2013–14 Handball-Bundesliga was the 49th season of the Handball-Bundesliga, Germany's premier handball league, and the 37th season consisting of only one league.

On September 12, 2014 in a match between HSV Hamburg and Rhein-Neckar Löwen the world record for most spectators at a handball match was broken with 44,189 spectators.

== Team information ==
Location of teams in the Handball-Bundesliga

Team	Location	Arena	Capacity
Frisch Auf Göppingen	Göppingen	EWS Arena	4,300
Füchse Berlin	Berlin	Max-Schmeling-Halle	8,500
SC Magdeburg	Magdeburg	GETEC Arena	7,782
TuS Nettelstedt-Lübbecke	Lübbecke	Kreissporthalle Lübbecke	3,300
HSV Hamburg	Hamburg	O2 World Hamburg	13,000
HSG Wetzlar	Wetzlar	RITTAL Arena	4,412
HBW Balingen-Weilstetten	Balingen	Sparkassen-Arena	2,000
Rhein-Neckar Löwen	Mannheim	SAP Arena	14,500
SG Flensburg-Handewitt	Flensburg	Flens-Arena	6,300
TBV Lemgo	Lemgo	Lipperlandhalle	5,000
THW Kiel	Kiel	Sparkassen-Arena	10,250
TSV Hannover-Burgdorf	Hannover	Swiss Life Hall	4,200
MT Melsungen	Kassel	Rothenbach-Halle	4,300
TV Emsdetten	Emsdetten	Emshalle	2,200
VfL Gummersbach	Gummersbach	Eugen-Haas-Halle	2,100
ThSV Eisenach	Eisenach	Werner-Aßmann-Halle	3,100
GWD Minden	Minden	Kampa-Arena	4,059
Bergischer HC	Wuppertal; Solingen	Uni-Halle; Klingenhalle	4,100; 2,600

== Standings ==
Pos	Team	Pld	W	D	L	GF	GA	GD	Pts
1	THW Kiel	34	29	1	4	1114	878	+236	59:9
2	Rhein-Neckar Löwen	34	28	3	3	1126	892	+234	59:9
3	SG Flensburg-Handewitt	34	26	2	6	1021	848	+173	54:14
4	HSV Hamburg	34	25	3	6	1082	978	+104	53:15
5	Füchse Berlin	34	22	2	10	953	882	+71	46:22
6	MT Melsungen	34	18	4	12	994	980	+14	40:28
7	SC Magdeburg	34	17	5	12	995	939	+56	39:29
8	TSV Hannover-Burgdorf	34	14	4	16	918	986	−68	32:34
9	TBV Lemgo	34	13	5	16	1010	1060	−50	31:37
10	TuS Nettelstedt-Lübbecke	34	13	4	17	917	972	−55	30:38
11	HSG Wetzlar	34	12	5	17	883	902	−19	29:39
12	Frisch Auf Göppingen	34	9	8	17	972	989	−17	26:42
13	VfL Gummersbach	34	11	4	19	902	969	−67	26:42
14	GWD Minden	34	9	6	19	905	976	−71	24:44
15	Bergischer HC	34	9	4	21	934	1010	−70	22:46
16	HBW Balingen-Weilstetten	34	5	9	20	905	980	−75	19:49
17	ThSV Eisenach	34	6	1	27	841	1028	−187	13:55
18	TV Emsdetten	34	4	2	28	869	1072	−203	10:58

== Results ==
Home \ Away	FAG	BER	BRG	EIS	EMS	GWD	HBW	HSG	HSV	MTM	RNL	SCM	SGF	TBV	THW	TSV	TUS	VFL
Göppingen		24–26	29–29	25–16	41–31	32–28	25–25	24–24	32–34	29–26	23–23	29–31	28–28	32–33	31–35	28–32	23–23	30–31
Berlin	28–23		22–25	34–20	34–19	32–25	30–29	27–23	32–33	24–22	21–21	27–24	20–31	26–22	29–33	26–21	25–23	27–22
Bergischer	28–30	25–36		34–26	33–27	20–24	29–29	27–28	34–27	30–31	26–34	31–27	28–30	34–34	25–31	25–26	25–29	27–34
Eisenach	25–23	23–22	33–26		26–28	28–26	29–24	27–28	32–39	27–31	19–42	20–26	23–31	32–32	23–29	28–29	29–32	26–30
Emsdetten	27–32	22–28	22–34	24–25		24–23	25–25	25–25	31–37	27–34	32–44	25–36	22–29	23–33	25–40	28–31	27–23	25–27
Minden	31–28	30–28	29–29	25–23	34–27		30–28	26–24	28–34	28–28	24–24	20–30	18–23	31–31	22–32	29–25	28–29	27–24
Balingen	31–32	25–33	27–29	29–22	32–21	26–26		18–31	29–34	28–28	21–30	26–26	24–32	29–29	25–28	28–27	31–26	25–25
Wetzlar	27–27	24–25	24–25	28–23	24–19	23–26	30–28		23–26	25–30	27–37	28–24	25–29	26–28	24–35	30–27	31–21	31–25
Hamburg	31–29	39–32	29–24	27–23	30–23	35–30	26–26	35–26		37–31	38–25	32–24	29–26	35–35	26–32	25–25	32–27	34–29
Melsungen	33–31	28–23	34–29	29–23	31–24	28–23	24–22	24–32	33–35		27–30	31–31	25–30	33–32	30–29	32–26	28–28	30–32
Löwen	42–31	31–27	35–28	30–27	39–24	33–29	37–30	34–23	32–31	41–28		32–26	29–22	35–27	29–26	37–19	37–24	36–22
Magdeburg	31–34	23–25	31–20	35–20	30–24	38–31	27–28	33–25	19–29	31–31	29–27		33–34	34–31	32–25	30–26	35–23	25–25
Flensburg	25–24	26–26	34–15	43–24	33–26	35–28	30–22	23–19	31–29	35–23	23–27	38–28		39–26	34–30	27–22	31–20	35–23
Lemgo	32–34	26–33	29–27	40–22	38–29	29–25	33–27	27–24	27–35	33–38	24–35	26–29	30–34		24–46	29–27	31–32	28–27
Kiel	31–20	37–23	33–24	30–21	35–28	34–25	35–24	26–25	35–24	32–29	31–28	27–27	33–25	38–25		37–20	37–30	31–30
Hannover	30–29	33–35	29–28	33–24	28–27	27–27	33–30	25–24	26–34	28–34	26–38	27–25	27–26	33–26	24–30		24–29	30–30
Lübbecke	27–27	28–29	38–30	24–21	27–35	30–29	26–30	34–29	28–34	32–22	23–22	24–30	25–29	24–25	21–35	28–28		23–22
Gummersbach	26–22	21–35	25–30	30–24	27–23	33–25	25–24	20–20	25–31	25–30	35–40	22–23	24–32	33–32	24–29	21–25	26–33	

Legend: Blue = home team win; Yellow = draw; Red = away team win.

== Number of teams by states ==
#	State	No. teams	Teams
1	North Rhine-Westphalia	6	Bergischer HC, TV Emsdetten, VfL Gummersbach, GWD Minden, TBV Lemgo and TuS Nettelstedt-Lübbecke
2	Baden-Württemberg	3	HBW Balingen-Weilstetten, Frisch Auf Göppingen and Rhein-Neckar Löwen
3	Hesse	2	MT Melsungen and HSG Wetzlar
3	Schleswig-Holstein	2	SG Flensburg-Handewitt and THW Kiel
5	Berlin	1	Füchse Berlin
5	Hamburg	1	HSV Hamburg
5	Lower Saxony	1	TSV Hannover-Burgdorf
5	Saxony-Anhalt	1	SC Magdeburg
5	Thuringia	1	ThSV Eisenach
