= 2016–17 Handball-Bundesliga =

Handball-Bundesliga
- Season: 2016–17
- Champions: Rhein-Neckar Löwen
- Relegated: Bergischer HC; HBW Balingen-Weilstetten; HSC 2000 Coburg
- Champions League: Rhein-Neckar Löwen; SG Flensburg-Handewitt; THW Kiel
- EHF Cup: Füchse Berlin; SC Magdeburg
- Matches: 306
- Goals: 16,513 (53.96 per match)
- Top goalscorer: Philipp Weber (224 goals)

The 2016–17 Handball-Bundesliga was the 52nd season of the Handball-Bundesliga, Germany's premier handball league and the 40th season consisting of only one league. It ran from 2 September 2016 to 10 June 2017.

Rhein-Neckar Löwen won their second consecutive title.

== Teams ==
Locations of the 2016–17 Handball-Bundesliga teams

A total of 18 teams will be participating in this year's edition of the Bundesliga. Of these, 15 sides qualified directly from the 2015–16 season and the top three sides were directly promoted from the 2. Bundesliga: HC Erlangen, the champions; GWD Minden, the runners-up; and the third-place finisher, HSC 2000 Coburg.

Team	Location	Arena	Capacity
HBW Balingen-Weilstetten	Balingen	Sparkassen-Arena	2,340
Bergischer HC	Wuppertal; Solingen	Uni-Halle; Klingenhalle	3,200; 2,800
Füchse Berlin	Berlin	Max-Schmeling-Halle	9,500
TVB 1898 Stuttgart	Stuttgart	Scharrena Stuttgart	2,050
HSC 2000 Coburg	Coburg	HUK-Coburg arena	3,530
HC Erlangen	Nuremberg	Arena Nürnberger Versicherung	8,200
SG Flensburg-Handewitt	Flensburg	Flens-Arena	6,300
Frisch Auf Göppingen	Göppingen	EWS Arena	5,600
VfL Gummersbach	Gummersbach	Schwalbe-Arena	4,132
TSV Hannover-Burgdorf	Hannover	Swiss Life Hall	4,460
THW Kiel	Kiel	Sparkassen-Arena	10,285
SC DHfK Leipzig	Leipzig	Arena Leipzig	4,500
TBV Lemgo	Lemgo	Lipperlandhalle	5,000
SC Magdeburg	Magdeburg	Bördelandhalle	7,071
MT Melsungen	Kassel	Rothenbach-Halle	4,300
GWD Minden	Minden	Kampa-Halle	4,059
Rhein-Neckar Löwen	Mannheim	SAP Arena	13,200
HSG Wetzlar	Wetzlar	Rittal Arena	4,412

== Standings ==
Pos	Team	Pld	W	D	L	GF	GA	GD	Pts	Qualification or relegation
1	Rhein-Neckar Löwen (C)	34	30	1	3	1011	840	+171	61	Champions League
2	SG Flensburg-Handewitt	34	28	2	4	1038	837	+201	58	Champions League
3	THW Kiel	34	26	1	7	960	849	+111	53	Champions League
4	Füchse Berlin	34	23	5	6	986	889	+97	51	EHF Cup
5	SC Magdeburg	34	23	5	6	988	902	+86	51	EHF Cup
6	HSG Wetzlar	34	20	1	13	897	857	+40	41	
7	MT Melsungen	34	18	2	14	947	924	+23	38	
8	SC DHfK Leipzig	34	16	3	15	883	871	+12	35	
9	HC Erlangen	34	14	0	20	890	941	−51	28	
10	Frisch Auf Göppingen	34	12	3	19	934	960	−26	27	
11	TSV Hannover-Burgdorf	34	11	2	21	935	954	−19	24	
12	GWD Minden	34	11	2	21	843	948	−105	24	
13	TBV Lemgo	34	10	3	21	926	988	−62	23	
14	TVB 1898 Stuttgart	34	10	3	21	865	944	−79	23	
15	VfL Gummersbach	34	10	2	22	867	934	−67	22	
16	Bergischer HC (R)	34	10	2	22	868	954	−86	22	Relegated
17	HBW Balingen-Weilstetten (R)	34	7	3	24	819	933	−114	17	Relegated
18	HSC 2000 Coburg (R)	34	6	2	26	856	988	−132	14	Relegated

Source: DKB Handball Bundesliga
Rules for classification: 1) points; 2) Goal difference; 3) Goals scored.
(C) Champions; (R) Relegated

== Results ==
Home \ Away	BAL	BRG	BER	COB	ERL	FLE	GÖP	GUM	HAN	KIE	LEI	LEM	MAG	MEL	MIN	RNL	STU	WET
Balingen		27–23	30–35	24–24	27–28	24–26	29–36	22–26	30–27	22–25	28–23	27–27	30–35	29–25	23–23	28–33	23–19	22–26
Bergischer HC	23–22		20–31	29–25	28–26	29–32	32–26	25–34	32–24	25–31	24–26	28–29	24–31	26–28	27–25	24–26	26–35	18–18
Berlin	31–21	29–30		29–23	24–21	34–32	31–26	27–28	34–27	18–26	29–20	26–24	25–25	33–31	36–26	30–30	28–25	27–24
Coburg	24–19	28–26	23–29		30–28	24–35	25–29	31–30	27–27	23–30	31–33	25–29	27–42	25–28	29–26	19–31	23–26	27–28
Erlangen	33–25	36–25	21–29	26–24		18–26	30–26	30–29	27–26	26–33	31–22	32–25	27–33	29–25	23–27	26–37	30–26	23–32
Flensburg	36–18	32–25	27–26	37–29	35–23		27–21	33–22	30–25	30–29	31–23	30–27	26–25	29–25	30–23	21–23	36–27	34–31
Göppingen	29–26	26–26	24–28	31–27	22–24	31–27		37–29	23–34	27–31	26–25	31–26	28–29	29–30	34–24	24–28	26–26	36–25
Gummersbach	26–19	21–26	26–26	31–27	19–21	23–28	22–22		30–26	23–29	22–24	31–28	30–27	23–30	28–26	20–27	27–20	27–28
Hannover	26–29	33–27	29–30	29–28	30–25	20–35	31–23	29–26		26–27	24–25	23–27	23–28	30–31	35–27	26–30	24–24	26–23
Kiel	26–23	24–20	32–28	28–26	30–22	24–23	30–21	34–21	27–26		29–25	34–23	28–24	30–28	23–23	26–29	25–24	34–25
Leipzig	34–23	30–21	28–32	33–28	29–25	24–30	29–23	27–25	23–25	34–25		32–27	24–24	23–20	21–19	24–25	25–20	30–26
Lemgo	20–23	23–25	29–34	32–22	28–27	29–33	27–26	32–31	26–31	34–30	25–25		25–34	29–33	26–27	28–33	24–24	29–26
Magdeburg	26–22	41–29	29–29	30–23	27–25	26–26	33–32	32–26	22–37	27–26	21–21	32–21		27–26	37–25	35–32	27–26	30–26
Melsungen	30–22	32–28	28–28	20–25	34–31	24–24	31–27	32–28	33–30	23–30	28–26	32–27	21–27		30–24	26–30	37–25	25–28
Minden	25–22	27–22	26–29	23–20	24–23	17–41	25–32	26–23	27–26	23–34	28–23	25–30	34–24	21–28		23–33	26–28	25–27
RN Löwen	33–23	31–28	30–25	33–20	29–27	17–21	35–26	34–20	34–30	28–19	24–23	35–32	29–20	33–28	26–20		30–21	24–20
TVB 1898 Stuttgart	25–21	26–24	27–29	26–20	24–27	28–46	29–35	23–21	30–20	22–27	28–26	30–29	31–32	21–23	29–31	27–35		18–28
Wetzlar	25–17	20–22	22–27	31–24	30–20	23–29	29–19	26–19	34–30	27–24	24–23	31–29	18–26	27–22	26–22	30–24	33–25	

Legend: Blue = home team win; Yellow = draw; Red = away team win.

== Attendances ==
Teams with an average home attendance of at least 10,000:

Team	Home average
THW Kiel	10,243
