= 2015–16 Handball-Bundesliga =

Handball-Bundesliga
- Season: 2015–16
- Champions: Rhein-Neckar Löwen
- Relegated: HSV Hamburg; TuS Nettelstedt-Lübbecke; ThSV Eisenach
- Champions League: Rhein-Neckar Löwen; SG Flensburg-Handewitt; THW Kiel
- EHF Cup: MT Melsungen; Füchse Berlin
- Matches: 272
- Goals: 14,797 (54.4 per match)
- Top goalscorer: (Serbia) Petar Nenadić (229 goals)

The 2015–16 Handball-Bundesliga was the 51st season of the Handball-Bundesliga, Germany's premier handball league and the 39th season consisting of only one league. It ran from 21 August 2015 to 5 June 2016.

Rhein-Neckar Löwen won their first ever Bundesliga title.

== Teams ==
Locations of the 2015–16 Handball-Bundesliga teams

A total of 18 teams were participating in this year's edition of the Bundesliga. Of these, 15 sides qualified directly from the 2014–15 season and the two sides were directly promoted from the 2014–15 2. Bundesliga season: SC DHfK Leipzig, the champions; ThSV Eisenach, the runners-up; and the third-place finisher in the 2. Bundesliga, TV Bittenfeld, now known as TVB Stuttgart.

Team	Location	Arena	Capacity
Frisch Auf Göppingen	Göppingen	EWS Arena	5,600
Füchse Berlin	Berlin	Max-Schmeling-Halle	9,500
SC Magdeburg	Magdeburg	GETEC Arena	7,071
TuS Nettelstedt-Lübbecke	Lübbecke	Merkur Arena	3,250
HSV Hamburg	Hamburg	Barclaycard Arena	13,000
HSG Wetzlar	Wetzlar	Rittal Arena	4,412
HBW Balingen-Weilstetten	Balingen	Sparkassen-Arena	2,340
Rhein-Neckar Löwen	Mannheim	SAP Arena	13,200
SG Flensburg-Handewitt	Flensburg	Campushalle	6,300
TBV Lemgo	Lemgo	Lipperlandhalle	5,000
THW Kiel	Kiel	Sparkassen-Arena	10,285
TSV Hannover-Burgdorf	Hannover	Swiss Life Hall	4,460
MT Melsungen	Kassel	Rothenbach-Halle	4,300
VfL Gummersbach	Gummersbach	Schwalbe-Arena	4,132
Bergischer HC	Wuppertal; Solingen	Uni-Halle; Klingenhalle	3,200; 2,800
SC DHfK Leipzig	Leipzig	Arena Leipzig	4,500
TVB 1898 Stuttgart	Stuttgart	Scharrena Stuttgart	2,050
ThSV Eisenach	Eisenach	Werner-Aßmann-Halle	3,100

== Standings ==
Pos	Team	Pld	W	D	L	GF	GA	GD	Pts	Qualification or relegation
1	Rhein-Neckar Löwen (C)	32	28	0	4	916	704	+212	56	Champions League
2	SG Flensburg-Handewitt	32	26	3	3	969	785	+184	55	Champions League
3	THW Kiel	32	24	2	6	974	822	+152	50	Champions League
4	MT Melsungen	32	22	3	7	910	825	+85	47	EHF Cup
5	Füchse Berlin	32	20	3	9	910	825	+85	43	EHF Cup
6	Frisch Auf Göppingen	32	19	1	12	888	820	+68	39	
7	TSV Hannover-Burgdorf	32	14	8	10	891	880	+11	36	
8	SC Magdeburg	32	14	7	11	895	880	+15	35	
9	VfL Gummersbach	32	16	3	13	874	864	+10	35	
10	HSG Wetzlar	32	15	4	13	823	822	+1	34	
11	SC DHfK Leipzig	32	13	4	15	856	904	−48	30	
12	Bergischer HC	32	9	1	22	815	911	−96	19	
13	TBV Lemgo	32	8	2	22	847	953	−106	18	
14	HBW Balingen-Weilstetten	32	6	3	23	850	934	−84	15	
15	TVB Stuttgart	32	4	6	22	783	926	−143	14	
16	ThSV Eisenach (R)	32	4	2	26	795	1002	−207	10	Relegated
17	TuS Nettelstedt-Lübbecke (R)	32	2	4	26	801	940	−139	8	Relegated
18	HSV Hamburg (Note: HSV Hamburg was excluded from the league on 20 January 2016 due to license violation. The results were abandoned.) (D, R)	0	0	0	0	0	0	0	0	Relegated

Source: dkb-handball-bundesliga.de
Rules for classification: 1) points; 2) Goal difference; 3) Goals scored.
(C) Champions; (D) Disqualified; (R) Relegated

== Results ==
Home \ Away	BAL	BRG	BER	EIS	FLE	GÖP	GUM	~~HAM~~	HAN	KIE	LEI	LEM	LÜB	MAG	MEL	RNL	STU	WET
Balingen		26–31	31–32	27–20	22–29	21–29	27–31		27–30	22–22	27–25	30–27	32–25	28–28	30–36	21–31	24–25	27–26
Bergischer HC	30–35		26–29	30–22	22–29	22–29	22–23		24–21	28–31	28–31	31–30	30–28	28–26	28–29	21–24	21–21	27–21
Berlin	31–26	34–28		30–24	26–27	31–27	26–24		28–28	24–27	34–27	37–27	34–31	30–26	23–24	24–22	26–20	23–20
Eisenach	33–21	28–26	28–40		24–32	28–29	28–32		24–36	19–31	24–35	22–28	31–30	23–29	27–30	19–36	28–28	25–29
Flensburg	32–22	41–27	30–30	35–18		32–25	28–25		37–21	30–25	35–28	29–21	34–27	33–30	32–33	25–32	34–19	35–23
Göppingen	34–30	31–19	25–23	31–21	23–28		28–21		35–28	29–21	29–21	35–25	28–22	32–24	27–24	19–26	35–26	28–29
Gummersbach	26–24	34–21	26–28	32–21	25–32	31–27			31–30	26–30	23–23	28–24	33–28	30–25	26–27	22–33	25–24	29–24
~~Hamburg~~																		
Hannover	32–27	29–24	25–22	37–27	25–25	26–23	29–24			30–30	25–31	28–23	29–28	31–31	24–24	18–30	30–22	28–24
Kiel	38–28	38–29	26–21	32–22	26–28	38–29	31–26		33–29		30–21	32–23	28–26	33–24	32–27	31–20	32–23	30–21
Leipzig	36–31	31–28	25–23	36–31	25–31	22–27	21–31		29–29	33–38		28–25	26–24	26–25	21–32	21–30	31–24	22–22
Lemgo	30–28	26–28	26–34	35–30	30–32	24–35	26–20		34–34	26–34	30–25		25–21	31–33	22–31	26–32	29–26	23–23
Lübbecke	25–24	26–27	25–32	22–24	19–25	26–26	25–28		29–29	23–33	24–24	22–30		28–29	19–30	23–35	23–22	28–29
Magdeburg	28–27	28–25	24–24	27–24	23–23	28–27	31–27		30–28	29–28	28–31	36–29	33–21		28–28	23–24	34–23	26–26
Melsungen	29–28	29–22	23–20	31–25	25–32	31–21	23–27		25–28	30–29	31–23	37–24	32–24	28–28		25–23	30–26	29–22
RN Löwen	29–24	28–20	28–26	39–25	22–25	25–14	31–22		27–23	24–20	28–22	33–19	32–20	27–25	34–24		31–20	26–18
Stuttgart	22–22	25–23	24–32	30–30	18–28	23–31	37–37		21–23	26–35	28–26	28–27	33–33	30–33	21–28	21–33		27–28
Wetzlar	32–21	28–19	27–33	26–20	24–21	24–20	30–30		31–28	26–30	29–30	29–22	33–24	27–23	29–25	19–23	24–20	

== Top goalscorers ==
Rank	Player	Club	Goals
1	(Serbia) Petar Nenadić	Füchse Berlin	229
2	(Austria) Robert Weber	SC Magdeburg	224
3	(Germany) Maximilian Holst	HSG Wetzlar	202
4	(Germany) Uwe Gensheimer	Rhein-Neckar Löwen	197
5	(Germany) Michael Spatz	TVB Stuttgart	181
6	(Switzerland) Andy Schmid	Rhein-Neckar Löwen	164
6	(Germany) Philipp Weber	SC DHfK Leipzig	164
8	(Germany) Julius Kühn	VfL Gummersbach	161
8	(Germany) Marcel Schiller	Frisch Auf Göppingen	161
10	(Germany) Johannes Sellin	MT Melsungen	159
10	(Denmark) Lasse Svan Hansen	SG Flensburg-Handewitt	159
