= Handball-Bundesliga =

German handball league

Bundesliga
- Current season, competition or edition: 2026–27 Handball-Bundesliga
- Sport: Handball
- Founded: 1966; 60 years ago
- First season: 1966–67
- President: Uwe Schwenker
- Administrator: Handball-Bundesliga e.V.
- No. of teams: 18
- Country: Germany
- Headquarters: Edmund-Rumpler-Str. 4, Cologne
- Confederation: EHF
- Most recent champion: SC Magdeburg (4th title) (2025–26)
- Most titles: THW Kiel (23 titles)
- Broadcaster: Dyn
- Sponsor: Opel
- Level on pyramid: Level 1
- Relegation to: 2. Handball-Bundesliga
- Domestic cups: DHB-Pokal; DHB-Supercup
- International cups: EHF Champions League; EHF European League
- Website: daikin-hbl.de

The Handball-Bundesliga (HBL), currently known as Opel Handball-Bundesliga for sponsorship reasons, is the top German professional handball league. From 2007 to 2012, the league was sponsored by Toyota and was officially called the Toyota Handball-Bundesliga. In 2012 the Deutsche Kreditbank AG (DKB) became the new sponsor. As of 2024, the latest league sponsor is Daikin and the official name has consequently been changed to Daikin Handball-Bundesliga. The winners of the respective season are the official German handball champions. The HBL is headquartered in Dortmund.

== History ==
The Bundesliga was introduced with the 1966–67 season and initially operated with two regional sections, North and South. Since 1977 the Bundesliga has operated with a single section first division, currently composed of eighteen clubs. In 1981 a 2. Bundesliga was introduced as a new second division, supplanting the Regionalliga which became the third tier. The 2. Bundesliga used to consist of two (resp. three in the first two years after the German reunification) sections north and south for thirty years. Starting with the 2011–12 season the 2. Bundesliga is run in a single section consisting of twenty teams.

== Season ==
The season has 34 game days (or weeks) and is played as a round-robin tournament without playoffs or a final. The season starts in August or September and ends in May.

The first and second-placed teams are entitled to play in the EHF Champions League the following season. The third, fourth, fifth and sixth-placed teams additionally play in the EHF European League. The seedings are subject to change, in case a German team wins the Champions League, the EHF European League or the EHF Cup Winner's Cup because each winner of those tournaments is granted an automatic start in the next year's tournament without taking one of the league's spots. It also can change if the DHB-Pokal Champion takes one of the league spots for the Champions League or the EHF European League.

== Relegation and promotion ==
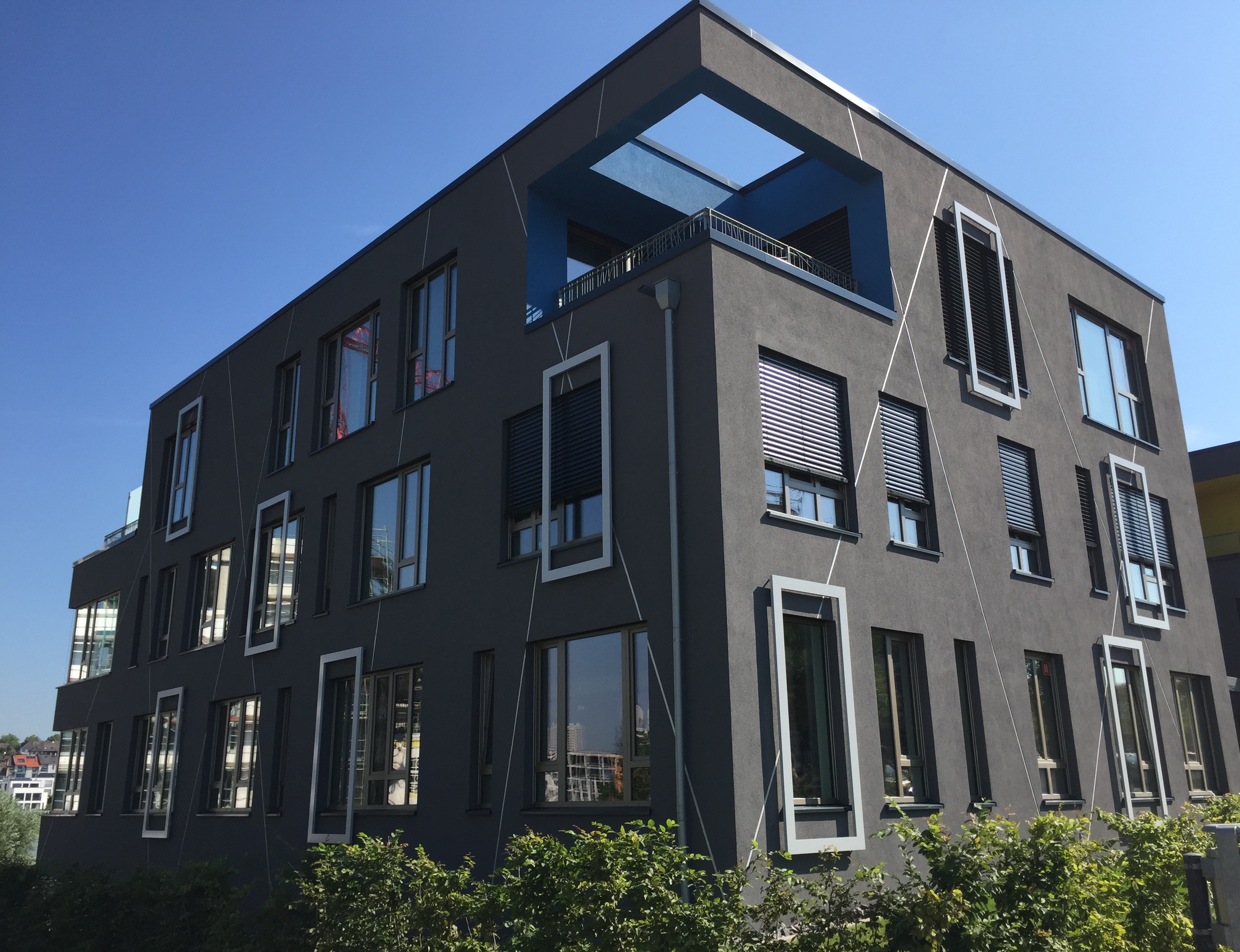
The HBL GmbH Headquarters

Until 2011, the two last placed teams would be relegated to the 2. Handball-Bundesliga for the next season, either in its northern or the southern section. The sixteenth placed team used to play in a home and away decider against the winner of the decider between the two-second placed teams of the northern and the southern section of the 2. Bundesliga. The champions of the second divisions received a spot for the Bundesliga automatically.

Since the 2017–18 season, the bottom two teams of the Bundesliga will directly be relegated to the 2. Bundesliga, while the top two teams of the 2. Bundesliga will be directly promoted to the Bundesliga.

== Clubs ==
Members of the 2025–26 Handball-Bundesliga.

Locations of the 2025–26 Handball-Bundesliga teams

Team	Location	Arena	Capacity
Bergischer HC	Wuppertal	Uni-Halle	3,200
Füchse Berlin	Berlin	Max-Schmeling-Halle	9,000
ThSV Eisenach	Eisenach	Werner-Aßmann-Halle	3,100
HC Erlangen	Nuremberg	PSD Bank Nürnberg Arena	8,308
SG Flensburg-Handewitt	Flensburg	GP Joule Arena	6,300
Frisch Auf Göppingen	Göppingen	EWS Arena	5,600
VfL Gummersbach	Gummersbach	Schwalbe-Arena	4,132
HSV Hamburg	Hamburg	Alsterdorfer Sporthalle	7,000
TSV Hannover-Burgdorf	Hannover	ZAG-Arena; Swiss Life Hall	9,850; 4,460
THW Kiel	Kiel	Wunderino Arena	10,285
SC DHfK Leipzig	Leipzig	Quarterback Immobilien Arena	6,327
TBV Lemgo	Lemgo	Phoenix-Contact-Arena	4,520
SC Magdeburg	Magdeburg	GETEC Arena	6,600
MT Melsungen	Kassel	Rothenbach-Halle	4,500
GWD Minden	Minden	Kampa-Halle	4,059
Rhein-Neckar Löwen	Mannheim	SAP Arena	13,200
TVB Stuttgart	Stuttgart	Porsche-Arena	6,211
HSG Wetzlar	Wetzlar	Buderus Arena Wetzlar	4,421

== Champions ==
The complete list of the German handball champions since 1950.

Season	Champion
1949–50	SV Polizei Hamburg
1950–51	SV Polizei Hamburg
1951–52	SV Polizei Hamburg
1952–53	SV Polizei Hamburg
1953–54	Frisch Auf Göppingen
1954–55	Frisch Auf Göppingen
1955–56	Berliner SV 1892
1956–57	THW Kiel
1957–58	Frisch Auf Göppingen
1958–59	Frisch Auf Göppingen
1959–60	Frisch Auf Göppingen
1960–61	Frisch Auf Göppingen
1961–62	THW Kiel
1962–63	THW Kiel
1963–64	Berliner SV 1892
1964–65	Frisch Auf Göppingen
1965–66	VfL Gummersbach
1966–67	VfL Gummersbach
1967–68	SG Leutershausen
1968–69	VfL Gummersbach
1969–70	Frisch Auf Göppingen
1970–71	Grün-Weiß Dankersen
1971–72	Frisch Auf Göppingen
1972–73	VfL Gummersbach
1973–74	VfL Gummersbach
1974–75	VfL Gummersbach
1975–76	VfL Gummersbach
1976–77	Grün-Weiß Dankersen
1977–78	TV Großwallstadt
1978–79	TV Großwallstadt
1979–80	TV Großwallstadt
1980–81	TV Großwallstadt
1981–82	VfL Gummersbach
1982–83	VfL Gummersbach
1983–84	TV Großwallstadt
1984–85	VfL Gummersbach
1985–86	TUSEM Essen
1986–87	TUSEM Essen
1987–88	VfL Gummersbach
1988–89	TUSEM Essen
1989–90	TV Großwallstadt
1990–91	VfL Gummersbach
1991–92	SG Wallau-Massenheim
1992–93	SG Wallau-Massenheim
1993–94	THW Kiel
1994–95	THW Kiel
1995–96	THW Kiel
1996–97	TBV Lemgo
1997–98	THW Kiel
1998–99	THW Kiel
1999–20	THW Kiel
2000–01	SC Magdeburg
2001–02	THW Kiel
2002–03	TBV Lemgo
2003–04	SG Flensburg-Handewitt
2004–05	THW Kiel
2005–06	THW Kiel
2006–07	THW Kiel
2007–08	THW Kiel
2008–09	THW Kiel
2009–10	THW Kiel
2010–11	HSV Hamburg
2011–12	THW Kiel
2012–13	THW Kiel
2013–14	THW Kiel
2014–15	THW Kiel
2015–16	Rhein-Neckar Löwen
2016–17	Rhein-Neckar Löwen
2017–18	SG Flensburg-Handewitt
2018–19	SG Flensburg-Handewitt
2019–20	THW Kiel
2020–21	THW Kiel
2021–22	SC Magdeburg
2022–23	THW Kiel
2023–24	SC Magdeburg
2024–25	Füchse Berlin
2025–26	SC Magdeburg

== Total titles won ==
Club	Winners	Years
THW Kiel	23	1957, 1962, 1963, 1994, 1995, 1996, 1998, 1999, 2000, 2002, 2005, 2006, 2007, 2008, 2009, 2010, 2012, 2013, 2014, 2015, 2020, 2021, 2023
VfL Gummersbach	12	1966, 1967, 1969, 1973, 1974, 1975, 1976, 1982, 1983, 1985, 1988, 1991
Frisch Auf Göppingen	9	1954, 1955, 1958, 1959, 1960, 1961, 1965, 1970, 1972
TV Großwallstadt	6	1978, 1979, 1980, 1981, 1984, 1990
SV Polizei Hamburg	4	1950, 1951, 1952, 1953
SC Magdeburg	4	2001, 2022, 2024, 2026
SG Flensburg-Handewitt	3	2004, 2018, 2019
TUSEM Essen	3	1986, 1987, 1989
Rhein-Neckar Löwen	2	2016, 2017
TBV Lemgo	2	1997, 2003
SG Wallau-Massenheim	2	1992, 1993
GWD Minden	2	1971, 1977
Berliner SV 1892*	2	1956, 1964
HSV Hamburg	1	2011
SG Leutershausen	1	1968
Füchse Berlin	1	2025

== Statistics ==
=== EHF coefficients ===
The following data indicates German coefficient rankings between European handball leagues.

View source data.

Country ranking: EHF League Ranking for 2025/26 season:

- 1. (1) (Germany) Handball-Bundesliga (328.00)
- 2. (2) (Spain) Liga ASOBAL (273.33)
- 3. (4) (Poland) Orlen Superliga (212.66)
- 4. (3) (France) LNH Division 1 (206.33)
- 5. (6) (Denmark) Herreligaen (202.33)

Club ranking: EHF Club Ranking as of 5 December 2025:

- 1. SC Magdeburg (708)
- 3. Füchse Berlin (627)
- 4. SG Flensburg-Handewitt (552)
- 7. THW KielSG Flensburg-Handewitt (526)
- 17. MT Melsungen (276)

== See also ==
- DHB-Pokal
- DHB-Supercup
- Handball-Bundesliga (women)
- DHB-Pokal (women)
