= 2022–23 DHB-Pokal =

DHB-Pokal
- 2022–23

Tournament information
- Sport: Handball
- Dates: 27 August 2022–16 April 2023
- Teams: 46
- Website: HBL

Final positions
- Champions: Rhein-Neckar Löwen
- Runner-up: SC Magdeburg

Tournament statistics
- Matches played: 46
- Goals scored: 2775 (60.33 per match)
- Attendance: 344,971 (7,499 per match)
- Top scorer(s): Kay Smits (41 goals)

The 2022–23 DHB-Pokal was the 46th edition of the tournament.

Rhein-Neckar Löwen won their second title with a finals win over SC Magdeburg.

== Round 1 ==
The draw was held on 28 June 2022. The matches were played between 26 and 29 August 2022. The teams were split into a north and south group. All 2021–22 Handball-Bundesliga teams received a bye.

26 August 2022; 19:00	VfL Pfullingen	27–33	TV Grosswallstadt	Kurt-App-Sporthalle, Pfullingen; Attendance: 420; Referees: Vom Dorff, Vom Dorff
26 August 2022; 19:00	Zeiler 6	(15–19)	Kammlodt 9	Kurt-App-Sporthalle, Pfullingen; Attendance: 420; Referees: Vom Dorff, Vom Dorff
26 August 2022; 19:00	2× (yellow card) 2× (suspension)	Report	2× (yellow card) 5× (suspension)	Kurt-App-Sporthalle, Pfullingen; Attendance: 420; Referees: Vom Dorff, Vom Dorff

26 August 2022; 19:00	SG Pforzheim/Eutingen	30–36	TSG Friesenheim	Bertha Benz Sporthalle, Pforzheim; Attendance: 398; Referees: Janz, Sug
26 August 2022; 19:00	Kirchenbauer 6	(15–18)	Falk 6	Bertha Benz Sporthalle, Pforzheim; Attendance: 398; Referees: Janz, Sug
26 August 2022; 19:00	1× (yellow card) 6× (suspension)	Report	1× (yellow card) 4× (suspension)	Bertha Benz Sporthalle, Pforzheim; Attendance: 398; Referees: Janz, Sug

26 August 2022; 20:00	Wilhelmshavener HV	25–35	ASV Hamm-Westfalen	Nordfrost-Arena, Wilhelmshaven; Attendance: 478; Referees: Otto, Piper
26 August 2022; 20:00	Mißling 4	(13–13)	Wieling 7	Nordfrost-Arena, Wilhelmshaven; Attendance: 478; Referees: Otto, Piper
26 August 2022; 20:00	1× (yellow card) 2× (suspension)	Report	2× (yellow card) 3× (suspension)	Nordfrost-Arena, Wilhelmshaven; Attendance: 478; Referees: Otto, Piper

27 August 2022; 17:00	TuS Fürstenfeldbruck	25–24	DJK Rimpar Wölfe	Wittelsbacher Halle, Fürstenfeldbruck; Attendance: 200; Referees: Hehn, Mayer
27 August 2022; 17:00	Link5 9	(12–13)	Schömig	Wittelsbacher Halle, Fürstenfeldbruck; Attendance: 200; Referees: Hehn, Mayer
27 August 2022; 17:00	2× (yellow card) 3× (suspension)	Report	1× (yellow card) 4× (suspension) 1× (red card)	Wittelsbacher Halle, Fürstenfeldbruck; Attendance: 200; Referees: Hehn, Mayer

27 August 2022; 19:00	TuS Vinnhorst	28–26	VfL Eintracht Hagen	Sportzentrum TuS Vinnhorst, Hanover; Attendance: 431; Referees: Kittel, Scharfe
27 August 2022; 19:00	Kolodziej 5	(13–12)	Toromanovic 6	Sportzentrum TuS Vinnhorst, Hanover; Attendance: 431; Referees: Kittel, Scharfe
27 August 2022; 19:00	9× (suspension)	Report	3× (suspension)	Sportzentrum TuS Vinnhorst, Hanover; Attendance: 431; Referees: Kittel, Scharfe

27 August 2022; 19:00	OHV Aurich	29–38	VfL Lübeck-Schwartau	Sparkassen-Arena Aurich, Aurich; Attendance: 310; Referees: Völkening, Zollitsch
27 August 2022; 19:00	Crnić 7	(17–20)	Speckmann 9	Sparkassen-Arena Aurich, Aurich; Attendance: 310; Referees: Völkening, Zollitsch
27 August 2022; 19:00	1× (yellow card) 5× (suspension)	Report	1× (yellow card) 3× (suspension)	Sparkassen-Arena Aurich, Aurich; Attendance: 310; Referees: Völkening, Zollitsch

27 August 2022; 19:30	TuS 04 KL-Dansenberg	22–28	HSC 2000 Coburg	Layenberger Sporthalle, Kaiserslautern; Attendance: 335; Referees: Schmitz, Schmitz
27 August 2022; 19:30	Bosing, Serwinsky 5	(9–14)	Herzig 6	Layenberger Sporthalle, Kaiserslautern; Attendance: 335; Referees: Schmitz, Schmitz
27 August 2022; 19:30	1× (yellow card) 3× (suspension)	Report	1× (yellow card) 2× (suspension)	Layenberger Sporthalle, Kaiserslautern; Attendance: 335; Referees: Schmitz, Schmitz

27 August 2022
19:30
TV Hüttenberg
40–39 (ET)
ThSV Eisenach
Sportzentrum Hüttenberg, Hüttenberg
Attendance: 546
Referees: Linker, Schmdit
Kuntscher 8
(18–16)
Hangstein 12
1× (yellow card) 6× (suspension)
Report
1× (yellow card) 9× (suspension)

FT: 32–32 ET: 8–7

27 August 2022; 20:00	SG Leutershausen	27–34	SG BBM Bietigheim	Heinrich-Beck-Halle, Hirschberg; Attendance: 340; Referees: Kauth, Kolb
27 August 2022; 20:00	Bitz 6	(13–17)	Velz 7	Heinrich-Beck-Halle, Hirschberg; Attendance: 340; Referees: Kauth, Kolb
27 August 2022; 20:00	2× (suspension)	Report	2× (suspension)	Heinrich-Beck-Halle, Hirschberg; Attendance: 340; Referees: Kauth, Kolb

27 August 2022; 20:00	HSG Konstanz	29–35	VfL Gummersbach	Schänzle-Sporthalle, Konstanz; Attendance: 850; Referees: Bona, Frank
27 August 2022; 20:00	Hutecek 6	(11–18)	Zelenović 6	Schänzle-Sporthalle, Konstanz; Attendance: 850; Referees: Bona, Frank
27 August 2022; 20:00	2× (suspension)	Report	2× (yellow card) 4× (suspension)	Schänzle-Sporthalle, Konstanz; Attendance: 850; Referees: Bona, Frank

28 August 2022; 16:00	1. VfL Potsdam	32–27	TuSEM Essen	MBS Arena, Potsdam; Attendance: 514; Referees: Grobe, Kinzel
28 August 2022; 16:00	Hansson 8	(16–10)	Dangers, Morante Maldonado 6	MBS Arena, Potsdam; Attendance: 514; Referees: Grobe, Kinzel
28 August 2022; 16:00	1× (yellow card) 7× (suspension)	Report	5× (suspension) 1× (red card)	MBS Arena, Potsdam; Attendance: 514; Referees: Grobe, Kinzel

28 August 2022; 17:00	HC Elbflorenz 2006	31–21	TSV Bayer Dormagen	BallsportArena Dresden, Dresden; Attendance: 520; Referees: Friedel, Herrmann
28 August 2022; 17:00	Stavast, Wucherpfennig 7	(16–10)	Meuser 6	BallsportArena Dresden, Dresden; Attendance: 520; Referees: Friedel, Herrmann
28 August 2022; 17:00	4× (suspension)	Report	1× (yellow card) 2× (suspension)	BallsportArena Dresden, Dresden; Attendance: 520; Referees: Friedel, Herrmann

28 August 2022; 17:00	MTV Braunschweig	34–36	Dessau-Roßlauer HV 06	Sporthalle Alte Waage, Braunschweig; Attendance: 365; Referees: Müller, Müller
28 August 2022; 17:00	Pieles 11	(14–19)	Hrstka 9	Sporthalle Alte Waage, Braunschweig; Attendance: 365; Referees: Müller, Müller
28 August 2022; 17:00	2× (yellow card) 6× (suspension) 1× (red card)	Report	4× (suspension)	Sporthalle Alte Waage, Braunschweig; Attendance: 365; Referees: Müller, Müller

29 August 2022; 19:00	HC Empor Rostock	22–20	HSG Nordhorn-Lingen	OSPA-Arena, Rostock; Attendance: 340; Referees: Blümel, Loppaschewski
29 August 2022; 19:00	Kohnagel, Schmidt 4	(10–10)	Pöhle 7	OSPA-Arena, Rostock; Attendance: 340; Referees: Blümel, Loppaschewski
29 August 2022; 19:00	1× (suspension)	Report	1× (yellow card) 5× (suspension)	OSPA-Arena, Rostock; Attendance: 340; Referees: Blümel, Loppaschewski

== Round 2 ==
The draw was held on 31 August 2022. The matches were played on 19, 20 October, 2 and 22 November 2022.

19 October 2022; 18:30	SG Flensburg-Handewitt	34–32	Füchse Berlin	Flens-Arena, Flensburg; Attendance: 5,500; Referees: Brodbeck, Reich
19 October 2022; 18:30	Jakobsen 10	(16–14)	Drux 7	Flens-Arena, Flensburg; Attendance: 5,500; Referees: Brodbeck, Reich
19 October 2022; 18:30	2× (yellow card) 3× (suspension)	Report	2× (yellow card) 5× (suspension)	Flens-Arena, Flensburg; Attendance: 5,500; Referees: Brodbeck, Reich

19 October 2022; 19:00	HC Empor Rostock	31–40	VfL Gummersbach	OSPA-Arena, Rostock; Attendance: 423; Referees: Fedtke, Wienrich
19 October 2022; 19:00	Steidtmann 7	(15–19)	Häseler 9	OSPA-Arena, Rostock; Attendance: 423; Referees: Fedtke, Wienrich
19 October 2022; 19:00	4× (suspension)	Report	4× (suspension)	OSPA-Arena, Rostock; Attendance: 423; Referees: Fedtke, Wienrich

19 October 2022; 19:30	HSC 2000 Coburg	27–31	TV Grosswallstadt	HUK-Coburg arena, Coburg; Attendance: 854; Referees: Hörath, Hofmann
19 October 2022; 19:30	Billek 8	(14–12)	Kammlodt 7	HUK-Coburg arena, Coburg; Attendance: 854; Referees: Hörath, Hofmann
19 October 2022; 19:30	5× (suspension) 1× (red card)	Report	7× (suspension)	HUK-Coburg arena, Coburg; Attendance: 854; Referees: Hörath, Hofmann

19 October 2022; 19:30	SG BBM Bietigheim	31–26	TV Hüttenberg	Sporthalle am Viadukt, Bietigheim-Bissingen; Attendance: 314; Referees: Baumgart, Wild
19 October 2022; 19:30	De la Peña 7	(16–13)	Weber 6	Sporthalle am Viadukt, Bietigheim-Bissingen; Attendance: 314; Referees: Baumgart, Wild
19 October 2022; 19:30	1× (yellow card) 3× (suspension)	Report	1× (yellow card) 5× (suspension)	Sporthalle am Viadukt, Bietigheim-Bissingen; Attendance: 314; Referees: Baumgart, Wild

19 October 2022; 19:30	HSG Wetzlar	35–27	HBW Balingen-Weilstetten	Rittal Arena Wetzlar, Wetzlar; Attendance: 663; Referees: Dinges, Schmack
19 October 2022; 19:30	three players 5	(17–14)	Vistorop 5	Rittal Arena Wetzlar, Wetzlar; Attendance: 663; Referees: Dinges, Schmack
19 October 2022; 19:30	1× (yellow card) 5× (suspension)	Report	6× (suspension) 1× (red card)	Rittal Arena Wetzlar, Wetzlar; Attendance: 663; Referees: Dinges, Schmack

19 October 2022; 19:30	VfL Lübeck-Schwartau	23–32	TBV Lemgo	Hansehalle, Lübeck; Attendance: 1,260; Referees: Klinke, Klinke
19 October 2022; 19:30	Ciudad Benitez, Horner 5	(12–17)	Lærke 11	Hansehalle, Lübeck; Attendance: 1,260; Referees: Klinke, Klinke
19 October 2022; 19:30	3× (suspension)	Report	1× (yellow card) 1× (suspension)	Hansehalle, Lübeck; Attendance: 1,260; Referees: Klinke, Klinke

19 October 2022; 19:30	HC Erlangen	30–34	MT Melsungen	Karl-Heinz-Hiersemann-Halle, Erlangen; Attendance: 1,450; Referees: Blümel, Loppaschewski
19 October 2022; 19:30	three players 5	(14–17)	Martinović 10	Karl-Heinz-Hiersemann-Halle, Erlangen; Attendance: 1,450; Referees: Blümel, Loppaschewski
19 October 2022; 19:30	2× (yellow card) 2× (suspension)	Report	1× (yellow card) 7× (suspension)	Karl-Heinz-Hiersemann-Halle, Erlangen; Attendance: 1,450; Referees: Blümel, Loppaschewski

19 October 2022; 19:30	Dessau-Roßlauer HV 06	34–30	TuS Nettelstedt-Lübbecke	Anhalt Arena, Dessau; Attendance: 650; Referees: Friedel, Herrmann
19 October 2022; 19:30	Sohmann 8	(19–17)	Strosack 7	Anhalt Arena, Dessau; Attendance: 650; Referees: Friedel, Herrmann
19 October 2022; 19:30	1× (yellow card) 5× (suspension)	Report	1× (yellow card) 6× (suspension) 1× (red card)	Anhalt Arena, Dessau; Attendance: 650; Referees: Friedel, Herrmann

19 October 2022; 20:00	TuS Fürstenfeldbruck	26–42	HSV Hamburg	Wittelsbacher Halle, Fürstenfeldbruck; Attendance: 800; Referees: Lier, Lier
19 October 2022; 20:00	Huber 5	(13–20)	Lassen 11	Wittelsbacher Halle, Fürstenfeldbruck; Attendance: 800; Referees: Lier, Lier
19 October 2022; 20:00	1× (yellow card)	Report	1× (yellow card)	Wittelsbacher Halle, Fürstenfeldbruck; Attendance: 800; Referees: Lier, Lier

19 October 2022; 20:30	TuS Vinnhorst	22–25	ASV Hamm-Westfalen	Sporthalle Vinnhorst, Hanover; Attendance: 731; Referees: Biehler, Dietz
19 October 2022; 20:30	Mazić 5	(12–14)	Schulze 6	Sporthalle Vinnhorst, Hanover; Attendance: 731; Referees: Biehler, Dietz
19 October 2022; 20:30	1× (yellow card) 7× (suspension) 2× (red card)	Report	6× (suspension)	Sporthalle Vinnhorst, Hanover; Attendance: 731; Referees: Biehler, Dietz

20 October 2022; 18:30	TSV Hannover-Burgdorf	26–20	TV Bittenfeld	ZAG-Arena, Hanover; Attendance: 2,018; Referees: Thöne, Zupanovic
20 October 2022; 18:30	Brozović 5	(11–11)	Slišković 5	ZAG-Arena, Hanover; Attendance: 2,018; Referees: Thöne, Zupanovic
20 October 2022; 18:30	4× (suspension)	Report	4× (suspension)	ZAG-Arena, Hanover; Attendance: 2,018; Referees: Thöne, Zupanovic

20 October 2022; 19:00	1. VfL Potsdam	23–38	THW Kiel	MBS Arena, Potsdam; Attendance: 2,050; Referees: Kuttler, Merz
20 October 2022; 19:00	Beneke 6	(16–19)	Wallinius 6	MBS Arena, Potsdam; Attendance: 2,050; Referees: Kuttler, Merz
20 October 2022; 19:00	4× (suspension) 1× (red card)	Report	6× (suspension)	MBS Arena, Potsdam; Attendance: 2,050; Referees: Kuttler, Merz

20 October 2022; 19:00	Bergischer HC	32–26	Frisch Auf Göppingen	Klingenhalle, Solingen; Attendance: 1,184; Referees: Thiyagarajah, Thiyagarajah
20 October 2022; 19:00	Weck 10	(15–12)	three players 4	Klingenhalle, Solingen; Attendance: 1,184; Referees: Thiyagarajah, Thiyagarajah
20 October 2022; 19:00	1× (yellow card) 3× (suspension)	Report	1× (yellow card) 3× (suspension)	Klingenhalle, Solingen; Attendance: 1,184; Referees: Thiyagarajah, Thiyagarajah

20 October 2022; 19:30	HC Elbflorenz 2006	25–24	GWD Minden	BallsportArena Dresden, Dresden; Attendance: 1,014; Referees: Bona, Frank
20 October 2022; 19:30	three players 4	(14–10)	Darmoul 5	BallsportArena Dresden, Dresden; Attendance: 1,014; Referees: Bona, Frank
20 October 2022; 19:30	1× (yellow card) 4× (suspension)	Report	1× (yellow card) 5× (suspension)	BallsportArena Dresden, Dresden; Attendance: 1,014; Referees: Bona, Frank

2 November 2022; 19:00	SC DHfK Leipzig	27–36	Rhein-Neckar Löwen	Arena Leipzig, Leipzig; Attendance: 3,853; Referees: Thiyagarajah, Thiyagarajah
2 November 2022; 19:00	Kristjánsson 8	(15–16)	Groetzki 9	Arena Leipzig, Leipzig; Attendance: 3,853; Referees: Thiyagarajah, Thiyagarajah
2 November 2022; 19:00	2× (yellow card) 2× (suspension)	Report	2× (suspension)	Arena Leipzig, Leipzig; Attendance: 3,853; Referees: Thiyagarajah, Thiyagarajah

22 November 2022; 19:00	TSG Friesenheim	30–35	SC Magdeburg	Friedrich-Ebert-Halle, Ludwigshafen; Attendance: 1,577; Referees: Kauth, Kolb
22 November 2022; 19:00	Durak 5	(19–20)	Smits 9	Friedrich-Ebert-Halle, Ludwigshafen; Attendance: 1,577; Referees: Kauth, Kolb
22 November 2022; 19:00	5× (suspension)	Report	4× (suspension)	Friedrich-Ebert-Halle, Ludwigshafen; Attendance: 1,577; Referees: Kauth, Kolb

== Round of 16 ==
The draw was held on 21 October 2022. The matches were played on 21 and 22 December 2022.

21 December 2022; 19:00	ASV Hamm-Westfalen	31–34	VfL Gummersbach	Westpress Arena, Hamm; Attendance: 2,367; Referees: Hurst, Krag
21 December 2022; 19:00	Orlowski 10	(14–16)	Viðarsson 7	Westpress Arena, Hamm; Attendance: 2,367; Referees: Hurst, Krag
21 December 2022; 19:00	1× (yellow card) 3× (suspension)	Report	3× (suspension)	Westpress Arena, Hamm; Attendance: 2,367; Referees: Hurst, Krag

21 December 2022; 19:00	SC Magdeburg	43–31	Bergischer HC	GETEC Arena, Magdeburg; Attendance: 4,561; Referees: Linker, Schmidt
21 December 2022; 19:00	Saugstrup 10	(22–16)	Nikolaisen 7	GETEC Arena, Magdeburg; Attendance: 4,561; Referees: Linker, Schmidt
21 December 2022; 19:00	1× (yellow card) 1× (suspension)	Report	6× (suspension)	GETEC Arena, Magdeburg; Attendance: 4,561; Referees: Linker, Schmidt

21 December 2022; 19:30	HC Elbflorenz 2006	27–32	TBV Lemgo	BallsportArena Dresden, Dresden; Attendance: 2,585; Referees: Blümel, Loppaschewski
21 December 2022; 19:30	Zobel 7	(16–17)	Hutecek, Zehnder 6	BallsportArena Dresden, Dresden; Attendance: 2,585; Referees: Blümel, Loppaschewski
21 December 2022; 19:30	1× (yellow card) 3× (suspension)	Report	1× (yellow card) 4× (suspension)	BallsportArena Dresden, Dresden; Attendance: 2,585; Referees: Blümel, Loppaschewski

21 December 2022; 19:30	MT Melsungen	28–36	Rhein-Neckar Löwen	Rothenbach-Halle, Kassel; Attendance: 4,406; Referees: Thiyagarajah, Thiyagarajah
21 December 2022; 19:30	Malašinskas 8	(12–18)	Knorr 8	Rothenbach-Halle, Kassel; Attendance: 4,406; Referees: Thiyagarajah, Thiyagarajah
21 December 2022; 19:30	1× (yellow card) 3× (suspension)	Report	2× (suspension)	Rothenbach-Halle, Kassel; Attendance: 4,406; Referees: Thiyagarajah, Thiyagarajah

22 December 2022; 19:00	SG Flensburg-Handewitt	35–28	HSV Hamburg	Flens-Arena, Flensburg; Attendance: 5,631; Referees: vom Dorff, vom Dorff
22 December 2022; 19:00	Golla, Gottfridsson 7	(18–12)	Hansen, Mortensen 6	Flens-Arena, Flensburg; Attendance: 5,631; Referees: vom Dorff, vom Dorff
22 December 2022; 19:00	1× (suspension)	Report	4× (suspension)	Flens-Arena, Flensburg; Attendance: 5,631; Referees: vom Dorff, vom Dorff

22 December 2022; 19:30	Dessau-Roßlauer HV 06	27–29	TSV Hannover-Burgdorf	Anhalt Arena, Dessau; Attendance: 2,506; Referees: Heine, Standke
22 December 2022; 19:30	Hrstka 7	(14–11)	Steinhauser 8	Anhalt Arena, Dessau; Attendance: 2,506; Referees: Heine, Standke
22 December 2022; 19:30	1× (yellow card) 5× (suspension) 1× (red card)	Report	1× (yellow card) 4× (suspension) 1× (red card)	Anhalt Arena, Dessau; Attendance: 2,506; Referees: Heine, Standke

22 December 2022; 19:30	SG BBM Bietigheim	28–35	THW Kiel	EgeTrans Arena, Bietigheim-Bissingen; Attendance: 4,018; Referees: Dinges, Schmack
22 December 2022; 19:30	Schäfer 6	(14–18)	Reinkind 8	EgeTrans Arena, Bietigheim-Bissingen; Attendance: 4,018; Referees: Dinges, Schmack
22 December 2022; 19:30	2× (suspension)	Report	3× (suspension)	EgeTrans Arena, Bietigheim-Bissingen; Attendance: 4,018; Referees: Dinges, Schmack

22 December 2022; 20:00	TV Grosswallstadt	23–25	HSG Wetzlar	F.a.n. Frankenstolz Arena, Aschaffenburg; Attendance: 2,331; Referees: Kern, Kuschel
22 December 2022; 20:00	Schauer 6	(15–14)	Lipovina, Mellegård 6	F.a.n. Frankenstolz Arena, Aschaffenburg; Attendance: 2,331; Referees: Kern, Kuschel
22 December 2022; 20:00	1× (yellow card) 7× (suspension)	Report	2× (yellow card) 2× (suspension)	F.a.n. Frankenstolz Arena, Aschaffenburg; Attendance: 2,331; Referees: Kern, Kuschel

== Quarterfinals ==
The draw took place on 23 December 2022. The matches were played on 4 and 5 February 2023.

4 February 2023
18:00
SG Flensburg-Handewitt
29–28 (ET)
HSG Wetzlar
Flens-Arena, Flensburg
Attendance: 4,887
Referees: Blümel, Loppaschewski
Hansen, Rød 7
(16–13)
Rubin 6
1× (yellow card) 1× (suspension)
Report
1× (yellow card) 3× (suspension) 1× (red card)

FT: 25–25 ET: 4–3

4 February 2023; 18:30	TSV Hannover-Burgdorf	25–31	Rhein-Neckar Löwen	ZAG-Arena, Hanover; Attendance: 7,886; Referees: Kuttler, Merz
4 February 2023; 18:30	Büchner 7	(10–14)	Gensheimer 10	ZAG-Arena, Hanover; Attendance: 7,886; Referees: Kuttler, Merz
4 February 2023; 18:30	1× (yellow card) 7× (suspension) 1× (red card)	Report	4× (suspension)	ZAG-Arena, Hanover; Attendance: 7,886; Referees: Kuttler, Merz

4 February 2023; 19:00	VfL Gummersbach	30–33	TBV Lemgo	Schwalbe-Arena, Gummersbach; Attendance: 4,132; Referees: Grobe, Kinzel
4 February 2023; 19:00	Blohme, Mappes 8	(14–18)	Suton 7	Schwalbe-Arena, Gummersbach; Attendance: 4,132; Referees: Grobe, Kinzel
4 February 2023; 19:00	1× (yellow card) 4× (suspension)	Report	4× (suspension)	Schwalbe-Arena, Gummersbach; Attendance: 4,132; Referees: Grobe, Kinzel

5 February 2023
15:00
THW Kiel
34–35 (ET)
SC Magdeburg
Barclays Arena, Hamburg
Attendance: 12,523
Referees: Baumgart, Wild
Johansson 9
(14–19)
Smits 9
1× (yellow card) 4× (suspension)
Report
1× (yellow card) 4× (suspension)

FT: 29–29 ET: 5–6

== Final four ==
The draw took place on 8 February 2023. The matches were played on 15 and 16 April 2023 at the Lanxess Arena, Cologne.

=== Bracket ===
Semi-finals
15 April
SG Flensburg-Handewitt	31
Rhein-Neckar Löwen	38
15 April
SC Magdeburg	33
TBV Lemgo	31

Final
16 April
Rhein-Neckar Löwen (Pen,)	31 (5)
SC Magdeburg	31 (3)
Third place
16 April
SG Flensburg-Handewitt	28
TBV Lemgo	23

=== Semifinals ===
15 April 2023; 16:10	SG Flensburg-Handewitt	31–38	Rhein-Neckar Löwen	Lanxess Arena, Cologne; Attendance: 19,750; Referees: Tönnies, Schulze
15 April 2023; 16:10	Mensah Larsen 10	(13–19)	Knorr 10	Lanxess Arena, Cologne; Attendance: 19,750; Referees: Tönnies, Schulze
15 April 2023; 16:10	3× (suspension)	Report	4× (suspension)	Lanxess Arena, Cologne; Attendance: 19,750; Referees: Tönnies, Schulze

15 April 2023; 19:00	SC Magdeburg	33–31	TBV Lemgo	Lanxess Arena, Cologne; Attendance: 19,750; Referees: Reich, Brodbeck
15 April 2023; 19:00	Smits 12	(17–13)	Hutecek 7	Lanxess Arena, Cologne; Attendance: 19,750; Referees: Reich, Brodbeck
15 April 2023; 19:00	1× (yellow card) 2× (suspension)	Report	1× (yellow card) 2× (suspension)	Lanxess Arena, Cologne; Attendance: 19,750; Referees: Reich, Brodbeck

=== Third place game ===
16 April 2023; 12:45	SG Flensburg-Handewitt	28–23	TBV Lemgo	Lanxess Arena, Cologne; Attendance: 19,750; Referees: Krag, Hurst
16 April 2023; 12:45	Einarsson, Gottfridsson 5	(17–11)	Hutecek 6	Lanxess Arena, Cologne; Attendance: 19,750; Referees: Krag, Hurst
16 April 2023; 12:45	1× (yellow card) 2× (suspension)	Report	1× (yellow card) 1× (suspension)	Lanxess Arena, Cologne; Attendance: 19,750; Referees: Krag, Hurst

=== Final ===
16 April 2023
15:40
Rhein-Neckar Löwen
36–34 (ET)
SC Magdeburg
Lanxess Arena, Cologne
Attendance: 19,750
Referees: Thiyagarajah, Thiyagarajah
Gensheimer 8
(16–13)
Smits 9
3× (suspension) 1× (red card)
Report
5× (suspension)

FT: 27–27 ET: 4–4 Pen: 5–3
