= 2016–17 DHB-Pokal =

Handball Tournament

The 2017 DHB-Pokal was the 41st edition of the tournament.

== Format ==
The first round was split in a north and a south part and played in mini tournaments where only the winner advance to the round of 16. From there on a knockout system was used to determine the winner. The final four will be played on one weekend in Hamburg.

== Round 1 ==
Games were played on 27 and 28 August 2016.

Team 1	Score	Team 2
North
Played in Rostock
HC Elbflorenz	20–35	SG Flensburg-Handewitt
HC Empor Rostock	24–22	VfL Eintracht Hagen
SG Flensburg-Handewitt	38–17	HC Empor Rostock
Played in Minden
TBV Lemgo	24–27	TuS Nettelstedt-Lübbecke
GWD Minden	37–23	TV Korschenbroich
TuS Nettelstedt-Lübbecke	22–23	GWD Minden
Played in Nordhorn
Eintracht Hildesheim	27–28	HSG Norderstedt
HSG Nordhorn-Lingen	20–23	SC Magdeburg
HSG Norderstedt	27–44	SC Magdeburg
Played in Hamm
THW Kiel	29–20	VfL Fredenbeck
ASV Hamm-Westfalen	30–23	Neusser HV
THW Kiel	35–25	ASV Hamm-Westfalen
Played in Wilhelmshaven
Wilhelmshavener HV	33–26	1. VFL Potsdam
Oranienburger HC	26–41	Füchse Berlin
Wilhelmshavener HV	28–35	Füchse Berlin
Played in Essen
SC DHfK Leipzig	38–21	SV Anhalt-Bernburg
SG Langenfeld 72/92	26–24	TUSEM Essen
SC DHfK Leipzig	36–23	SG Langenfeld 72/92
Played in Bad Schwartau
Dessau-Roßlauer HV 06	32–27	DHK Flensborg
TSV Hannover-Burgdorf	31–27	VfL Lübeck-Schwartau
Dessau-Roßlauer HV 06	24–38	TSV Hannover-Burgdorf
Played in Solingen
Bergischer HC	28–21	TV Emsdetten
HF Springe	31–33	HSG Krefeld
Bergischer HC	34–16	HSG Krefeld
South
Played in Erlangen
ThSV Eisenach	34–22	SG Nussloch 1887
HC Erlangen	33–26	TSV Bayer Dormagen
ThSV Eisenach	23–30	HC Erlangen
Played in Bietigheim
SG BBM Bietigheim	36–31	Leichlinger TV
TV Bittenfeld	31–23	MSG Groß-Bieberau/Modau
SG BBM Bietigheim	23–22	TV Bittenfeld
Played in Lößnitz
HSC Bad Neustadt	21–34	HBW Balingen-Weilstetten
EHV Aue	31–23	HSG Konstanz
HBW Balingen-Weilstetten	29–27	EHV Aue
Played in Kreuztal
HC Glauchau-Meerane	17–33	TuS Ferndorf
TV Hochdorf	19–42	Rhein-Neckar Löwen
TuS Ferndorf	22–31	Rhein-Neckar Löwen
Played in Saarlouis
TSB Heilbronn-Horkheim	22–41	Frisch Auf Göppingen
DJK Rimpar Wölfe	24–22	HG Saarlouis
Frisch Auf Göppingen	30–28	DJK Rimpar Wölfe
Played in Fürstenfeldbruck
TSG Friesenheim	34–23	Longericher SC
VfL Gummersbach	31–27	TuS Fürstenfeldbruck
TSG Friesenheim	32–31	VfL Gummersbach
Played in Coburg
TV Hüttenberg	25–30	HSG Wetzlar
HSC 2000 Coburg	33–21	Germania Großsachsen
HSG Wetzlar	31–22	HSC 2000 Coburg
Played in Neuhausen
MT Melsungen	35–20	SG Leutershausen
TV 1893 Neuhausen	31–26	HSG Rodgau Nieder-Roden
MT Melsungen	37–30	TV 1893 Neuhausen

== Round 2 ==
The draw was held on 31 August 2016.

25 October 2016; 19:00	TSV Hannover-Burgdorf	30–20	Frisch Auf Göppingen	AWD Hall, Hannover; Attendance: 1,769; Referees: Moles, Pittner
25 October 2016; 19:00	Häfner 7	(14–12)	Schiller 5	AWD Hall, Hannover; Attendance: 1,769; Referees: Moles, Pittner
25 October 2016; 19:00	3× (yellow card) 2× (suspension)	Report	3× (yellow card) 1× (suspension)	AWD Hall, Hannover; Attendance: 1,769; Referees: Moles, Pittner

26 October 2016
19:00
SG Flensburg-Handewitt
36–34 (ET)
Füchse Berlin
Flens-Arena, Flensburg
Attendance: 5,687
Referees: Schulze, Tönnies
Mogensen 7
(14–16)
Nenadić 8
3× (yellow card) 5× (suspension)
Report
2× (yellow card) 3× (suspension)

FT: 30–30 ET: 6–4

26 October 2016; 19:00	GWD Minden	28–32	MT Melsungen	Kampa-Halle, Minden; Attendance: 955; Referees: Baumgart, Wild
26 October 2016; 19:00	Gellerud, Svitlica 6	(13–19)	Sellin 8	Kampa-Halle, Minden; Attendance: 955; Referees: Baumgart, Wild
26 October 2016; 19:00	3× (yellow card) 2× (suspension)	Report	3× (yellow card) 2× (suspension) 1× (red card)	Kampa-Halle, Minden; Attendance: 955; Referees: Baumgart, Wild

26 October 2016; 19:30	HSG Wetzlar	25–27	SC DHfK Leipzig	Sporthalle Hüttenberg, Wetzlar; Attendance: 1,223; Referees: Behrens, Fasthoff
26 October 2016; 19:30	Bjørnsen 8	(15–12)	Jurdžs, Rojewski 4	Sporthalle Hüttenberg, Wetzlar; Attendance: 1,223; Referees: Behrens, Fasthoff
26 October 2016; 19:30	3× (yellow card) 4× (suspension)	Report	1× (yellow card) 4× (suspension)	Sporthalle Hüttenberg, Wetzlar; Attendance: 1,223; Referees: Behrens, Fasthoff

26 October 2016; 20:00	SG BBM Bietigheim	29–32	TSG Friesenheim	Sporthalle am Viadukt, Bietigheim; Attendance: 709; Referees: Hurst, Krag
26 October 2016; 20:00	Haller, Schäfer 5	(14–14)	Weber 7	Sporthalle am Viadukt, Bietigheim; Attendance: 709; Referees: Hurst, Krag
26 October 2016; 20:00	3× (yellow card) 4× (suspension)	Report	3× (yellow card) 8× (suspension)	Sporthalle am Viadukt, Bietigheim; Attendance: 709; Referees: Hurst, Krag

26 October 2016; 20:15	SC Magdeburg	21–22	THW Kiel	GETEC Arena, Magdeburg; Attendance: 6,247; Referees: Blümel, Loppaschewski
26 October 2016; 20:15	Weber 8	(11–10)	Ekberg 6	GETEC Arena, Magdeburg; Attendance: 6,247; Referees: Blümel, Loppaschewski
26 October 2016; 20:15	3× (yellow card) 2× (suspension) 1× (red card)	Report	2× (yellow card) 2× (suspension)	GETEC Arena, Magdeburg; Attendance: 6,247; Referees: Blümel, Loppaschewski

26 October 2016; 20:15	HBW Balingen-Weilstetten	27–23	Bergischer HC	Sparkassen-Arena, Balingen; Attendance: 1,563; Referees: Kilp, Maier
26 October 2016; 20:15	Kunkel 8	(13–11)	Gunnarsson 6	Sparkassen-Arena, Balingen; Attendance: 1,563; Referees: Kilp, Maier
26 October 2016; 20:15	3× (yellow card) 6× (suspension)	Report	2× (yellow card) 3× (suspension)	Sparkassen-Arena, Balingen; Attendance: 1,563; Referees: Kilp, Maier

27 October 2016; 19:00	HC Erlangen	23–29	Rhein-Neckar Löwen	Nuremberg Arena, Nuremberg; Attendance: 3,244; Referees: Brauer, Holm
27 October 2016; 19:00	Link 8	(11–15)	Petersson, Schmid 6	Nuremberg Arena, Nuremberg; Attendance: 3,244; Referees: Brauer, Holm
27 October 2016; 19:00	2× (yellow card) 3× (suspension)	Report	2× (yellow card) 2× (suspension)	Nuremberg Arena, Nuremberg; Attendance: 3,244; Referees: Brauer, Holm

== Quarterfinals ==
The draw was held on 2 November 2016.

13 December 2016; 19:00	SC DHfK Leipzig	28–24	TSV Hannover-Burgdorf	Arena Leipzig, Leipzig; Attendance: 4,028; Referees: Blümel, Loppaschweski
13 December 2016; 19:00	Pieczkowski 7	(14–13)	Böhm 5	Arena Leipzig, Leipzig; Attendance: 4,028; Referees: Blümel, Loppaschweski
13 December 2016; 19:00	4× (yellow card) 4× (suspension)	Report	3× (yellow card) 3× (suspension)	Arena Leipzig, Leipzig; Attendance: 4,028; Referees: Blümel, Loppaschweski

14 December 2016; 19:00	SG Flensburg-Handewitt	32–28	MT Melsungen	Flens-Arena, Flensburg; Attendance: 4,542; Referees: Behrens, Fasthoff
14 December 2016; 19:00	Eggert 10	(17–18)	Allendorf 11	Flens-Arena, Flensburg; Attendance: 4,542; Referees: Behrens, Fasthoff
14 December 2016; 19:00	3× (yellow card) 4× (suspension)	Report	3× (yellow card) 7× (suspension)	Flens-Arena, Flensburg; Attendance: 4,542; Referees: Behrens, Fasthoff

14 December 2016; 19:00	TSG Friesenheim	23–29	THW Kiel	Friedrich-Ebert-Halle, Ludwigshafen; Attendance: 2,350; Referees: Hartmann, Schneider
14 December 2016; 19:00	Feld 5	(14–14)	Ekberg 8	Friedrich-Ebert-Halle, Ludwigshafen; Attendance: 2,350; Referees: Hartmann, Schneider
14 December 2016; 19:00	3× (yellow card) 4× (suspension)	Report	3× (yellow card) 2× (suspension)	Friedrich-Ebert-Halle, Ludwigshafen; Attendance: 2,350; Referees: Hartmann, Schneider

14 December 2016; 20:45	HBW Balingen-Weilstetten	25–32	Rhein-Neckar Löwen	Sparkassen-Arena, Balingen; Attendance: 2,090; Referees: Geipel, Helbig
14 December 2016; 20:45	Friedrich, Hausmann 6	(10–17)	Ekdahl du Rietz, Schmid 7	Sparkassen-Arena, Balingen; Attendance: 2,090; Referees: Geipel, Helbig
14 December 2016; 20:45	3× (yellow card) 3× (suspension)	Report	1× (yellow card) 1× (suspension)	Sparkassen-Arena, Balingen; Attendance: 2,090; Referees: Geipel, Helbig

== Final four ==
The final four was held on 8 and 9 April 2017 at the Barclaycard Arena in Hamburg. The draw was held on 13 January 2017.

=== Bracket ===
Semifinals
8 April
SC DHfK Leipzig	32
THW Kiel	35
8 April
Rhein-Neckar Löwen	23
SG Flensburg-Handewitt	33

Final
9 April
THW Kiel	29
SG Flensburg-Handewitt	23

=== Semifinals ===
8 April 2017; 14:30	SC DHfK Leipzig	32–35	THW Kiel	Barclaycard Arena, Hamburg; Attendance: 13,200; Referees: Pritschow, Pritschow
8 April 2017; 14:30	Binder, Pieczkowski 7	(19–19)	Ekberg 12	Barclaycard Arena, Hamburg; Attendance: 13,200; Referees: Pritschow, Pritschow
8 April 2017; 14:30	2× (yellow card) 5× (suspension)	Report	2× (yellow card) 1× (suspension)	Barclaycard Arena, Hamburg; Attendance: 13,200; Referees: Pritschow, Pritschow

8 April 2017; 17:30	Rhein-Neckar Löwen	23–33	SG Flensburg-Handewitt	Barclaycard Arena, Hamburg; Attendance: 13,200; Referees: Baumgart, Wild
8 April 2017; 17:30	Ekdahl du Rietz, Petersson 5	(16–18)	Lauge Schmidt 8	Barclaycard Arena, Hamburg; Attendance: 13,200; Referees: Baumgart, Wild
8 April 2017; 17:30	3× (yellow card) 2× (suspension)	Repiort	3× (yellow card) 2× (suspension)	Barclaycard Arena, Hamburg; Attendance: 13,200; Referees: Baumgart, Wild

=== Final ===
9 April 2017; 14:30	THW Kiel	29–23	SG Flensburg-Handewitt	Barclaycard Arena, Hamburg; Attendance: 13,200; Referees: Tönnies, Schulze
9 April 2017; 14:30	Duvnjak 7	(13–12)	Glandorf, Lauge Schmidt 4	Barclaycard Arena, Hamburg; Attendance: 13,200; Referees: Tönnies, Schulze
9 April 2017; 14:30	3× (yellow card) 3× (suspension)	Report	3× (yellow card) 4× (suspension)	Barclaycard Arena, Hamburg; Attendance: 13,200; Referees: Tönnies, Schulze
