= 2015 DHB-Pokal =

The 2015 DHB-Pokal was the 39th edition of the tournament. SG Flensburg-Handewitt won the title, beating SC Magdeburg in the final.

== Format ==
The six best placed teams from the 2013–14 Handball-Bundesliga received a bye into the second round. The first round was split into north and south parts.

== Round 1 ==
The first round was drawn on 3 July 2014.

| Team 1 | Score | Team 2 |
|---|---|---|
20 August 2014
| SG OSF Berlin | 22–42 | SC Magdeburg |
| TV Emsdetten | 33–30 | EHV Aue |
| HSG Handball Lemgo II | 21–34 | TuS Nettelstedt-Lübbecke |
| SV Langenweddingen | 19–44 | TBV Lemgo |
| 1.VfL Potsdam 1990 | 22–37 | Bergischer HC |
| TSV Bayer Dormagen | 21–18 | HSG Nordhorn-Lingen |
| HC Empor Rostock | 38–37 | TUSEM Essen |
| TuS Fürstenfeldbruck | 34–41 | TSG Friesenheim |
| HSV Bad Blankenburg | 28–40 | SG BBM Bietigheim |
| ThSV Eisenach | 25–20 | SG Leutershausen |
| SC DHfK Leipzig | 27–25 | TV Bittenfeld |
| VfL Fredenbeck | 20–33 | GWD Minden |
| TV Korschenbroich | 30–34 | TSV Hannover-Burgdorf |
| SV Henstedt-Ulzburg | 26–27 | VfL Lübeck-Schwartau |
| Wilhelmshavener HV | 26–24 | ASV Hamm-Westfalen |
| HSG Tarp-Wanderup | 18–41 | Eintracht Hildesheim |
| TSG Haßloch | 16–34 | HC Erlangen |
| HSG Kleenheim | 17–35 | Frisch Auf Göppingen |
| SG Köndringen/Teningen | 25–35 | VfL Gummersbach |
| SV Plauen-Oberlosa 04 | 24–39 | HSG Wetzlar |
| SV 64 Zweibrücken | 22–33 | HBW Balingen-Weilstetten |
| TSB Heilbronn/Horkheim | 26–23 | TV Grosswallstadt |
| SG Pforzheim/Eutingen | 20–31 | TV 05/07 Hüttenberg |
| TV Nieder-Olm | 10–35 | DJK Rimpar Wölfe |
| TV 1893 Neuhausen | 16–20 | HG Saarlouis |
| HG Hamburg-Barmbek | 22–37 | TSV Altenholz |

== Round 2 ==
The second round was drawn on 24 August 2014.

| Team 1 | Score | Team 2 |
|---|---|---|
21 October 2014
| VfL Gummersbach | 33–27 | SG BBM Bietigheim |
| THW Kiel | 32–20 | TBV Lemgo |
| SC DHfK Leipzig | 25–18 | TV 05/07 Hüttenberg |
22 October 2014
| TV Emsdetten | 32–34 | GWD Minden |
| SG Flensburg-Handewitt | 38–22 | MT Melsungen |
| TSV Altenholz | 20–32 | Frisch Auf Göppingen |
| TUSEM Essen | 21–29 | Füchse Berlin |
| TSV Bayer Dormagen | 25–28 | HBW Balingen-Weilstetten |
| Eintracht Hildesheim | 25–35 | SC Magdeburg |
| HC Erlangen | 26–23 | HSG Wetzlar |
| TSB Heilbronn/Horkheim | 27–37 | Rhein-Neckar Löwen |
| HG Saarlouis | 29–30 | TSG Friesenheim |
| DJK Rimpar Wölfe | 27–29 | ThSV Eisenach |
| Wilhelmshavener HV | 30–26 | VfL Lübeck-Schwartau |
| Bergischer HC | 26–32 | TuS Nettelstedt-Lübbecke |
| TSV Hannover-Burgdorf | 28–25 | HSV Hamburg |

== Round 3 ==
The third round was drawn on 29 October 2014.

| Team 1 | Score | Team 2 |
|---|---|---|
17 December 2014
| TSV Hannover-Burgdorf | 30–31 | VfL Gummersbach |
| GWD Minden | 23–32 | Frisch Auf Göppingen |
| SG Flensburg-Handewitt | 39–20 | TSG Friesenheim |
| SC DHfK Leipzig | 28–24 | HBW Balingen-Weilstetten |
| THW Kiel | 30–29 | TuS Nettelstedt-Lübbecke |
| ThSV Eisenach | 27–28 | SC Magdeburg |
| Wilhelmshavener HV | 27–31 | Rhein-Neckar Löwen |
| HC Erlangen | 23–27 | Füchse Berlin |

== Quarterfinals ==
The quarterfinals were drawn on 20 December 2014.

| Team 1 | Score | Team 2 |
|---|---|---|
4 March 2015
| SC DHfK Leipzig | 19–29 | Füchse Berlin |
| SC Magdeburg | 32–17 | Frisch Auf Göppingen |
| Rhein-Neckar Löwen | 29–26 | THW Kiel |
| VfL Gummersbach | 22–28 | SG Flensburg-Handewitt |

== Final four ==
=== Bracket ===
Semifinals
9 May
Rhein-Neckar Löwen | 23
SG Flensburg-Handewitt | 24
9 May
Füchse Berlin | 26
SC Magdeburg | 27

Final
10 May
SG Flensburg-Handewitt | 32
SC Magdeburg | 31

=== Semifinals ===
| 9 May 2015; 14:00 | Rhein-Neckar Löwen | 23–24 | SG Flensburg-Handewitt | O_{2} World, Hamburg; Attendance: 13,300; Referees: Pritschow, Pritschow (GER) |
| 9 May 2015; 14:00 | Gensheimer 11 | (10–10) | Jakobsson 7 | O_{2} World, Hamburg; Attendance: 13,300; Referees: Pritschow, Pritschow (GER) |
| 9 May 2015; 14:00 | 2× (suspension) | Report | 5× (suspension) | O_{2} World, Hamburg; Attendance: 13,300; Referees: Pritschow, Pritschow (GER) |

| 9 May 2015; 16:45 | Füchse Berlin | 26–27 | SC Magdeburg | O_{2} World, Hamburg; Attendance: 13,300; Referees: Baumgart, Wild (GER) |
| 9 May 2015; 16:45 | Nenadić 9 | (15–12) | Bezjak, Natek 5 | O_{2} World, Hamburg; Attendance: 13,300; Referees: Baumgart, Wild (GER) |
| 9 May 2015; 16:45 | 3× (suspension) | Report | 4× (suspension) | O_{2} World, Hamburg; Attendance: 13,300; Referees: Baumgart, Wild (GER) |

=== Final ===
10 May 2015
14:15
SG Flensburg-Handewitt
32–31 (ET)
SC Magdeburg
O_{2} World, Hamburg
Attendance: 13,300
Referees: Fleisch, Rieber (GER)
Eggert 9
(11–11)
Natek, Weber 6
3× (suspension)
Report
2× (suspension)

FT: 24–24 ET: 3–3, 5–4 (pen.)
