= 2026–27 Handball-Bundesliga =

Handball league season

Handball-Bundesliga
- Season: 2026–27
- Dates: 27 August 2026 – 6 June 2027
- Matches: 115
- Goals: 6,958 (60.5 per match)
- Top goalscorer: Mathias Gidsel (116 goals)
- All statistics correct as of 22 November 2026.

The 2026–27 Handball-Bundesliga is the 62nd season of the Handball-Bundesliga, Germany's premier handball league and the 49th season consisting of only one league. It runs from 27 August 2026 to 6 June 2027.

== Teams ==
Locations of the 2026–27 Handball-Bundesliga teams

=== Team changes ===
Promoted from 2025–26 2. Handball-Bundesliga	Relegated from 2025–26 Handball-Bundesliga
SG BBM Bietigheim; HBW Balingen-Weilstetten	GWD Minden; SC DHfK Leipzig

=== Stadiums ===
Team	Location	Arena	Capacity
HBW Balingen-Weilstetten	Balingen	MaxMey-Generalbau-Arena	2,320
Bergischer HC	Wuppertal	Uni-Halle	3,200
Füchse Berlin	Berlin	Max-Schmeling-Halle	9,000
SG BBM Bietigheim	Bietigheim-Bissingen	EgeTrans Arena	4,517
ThSV Eisenach	Eisenach	Werner-Aßmann-Halle	3,100
HC Erlangen	Nuremberg	PSD Bank Nürnberg Arena	8,308
SG Flensburg-Handewitt	Flensburg	GP Joule Arena	6,300
Frisch Auf Göppingen	Göppingen	EWS Arena	5,600
VfL Gummersbach	Gummersbach	Schwalbe-Arena	4,132
HSV Hamburg	Hamburg	Alsterdorfer Sporthalle	7,000
TSV Hannover-Burgdorf	Hanover	ZAG-Arena; Swiss Life Hall	10,767; 4,460
THW Kiel	Kiel	Wunderino Arena	10,285
TBV Lemgo	Lemgo	Phoenix-Contact-Arena	4,520
SC Magdeburg	Magdeburg	GETEC Arena	6,600
MT Melsungen	Kassel	Rothenbach-Halle	4,500
Rhein-Neckar Löwen	Mannheim	SAP Arena	13,200
TVB Stuttgart	Stuttgart	Porsche-Arena	6,211
HSG Wetzlar	Wetzlar	Buderus Arena Wetzlar	4,421

== Standings ==
Pos	Team	Pld	W	D	L	GF	GA	GD	Pts	Qualification or relegation
1	SC Magdeburg	13	12	0	1	433	368	+65	24	Champions League
2	THW Kiel	14	11	1	2	434	386	+48	23	Champions League
3	SG Flensburg-Handewitt	13	10	1	2	447	406	+41	21	EHF European League
4	VfL Gummersbach	13	8	2	3	421	390	+31	18	EHF European League
5	Füchse Berlin	12	9	0	3	398	371	+27	18	EHF European League
6	MT Melsungen	13	7	2	4	394	365	+29	16	
7	HC Erlangen	13	7	1	5	400	401	−1	15	
8	TBV Lemgo	13	7	1	5	404	407	−3	15	
9	TSV Hannover-Burgdorf	13	5	3	5	382	386	−4	13	
10	TVB Stuttgart	12	5	2	5	367	366	+1	12	
11	Bergischer HC	12	4	0	8	328	354	−26	8	
12	Rhein-Neckar Löwen	13	3	2	8	377	404	−27	8	
13	Frisch Auf Göppingen	12	4	0	8	338	368	−30	8	
14	ThSV Eisenach	13	3	2	8	363	394	−31	8	
15	HBW Balingen-Weilstetten	12	3	1	8	345	351	−6	7	
16	HSV Hamburg	13	3	1	9	376	397	−21	7	
17	SG BBM Bietigheim	13	2	1	10	377	426	−49	5	Relegated to 2. Handball-Bundesliga
18	HSG Wetzlar	13	1	2	10	374	418	−44	4	Relegated to 2. Handball-Bundesliga

Updated to match(es) played on 22 November 2026. Source: HBL
Rules for classification: 1) points; 2) head-to-head points; 3) head-to-head goal difference; 4) head-to-head number of goals scored; 5) goal difference; 6) goals scored.

== Results ==
Home \ Away	BAL	BRG	BER	BIE	EIS	ERL	FLE	GÖP	GUM	HAM	HAN	LEM	KIE	MAG	MEL	RNL	STU	WET
HBW Balingen-Weilstetten	—	28–29								30–26	29–29			30–31	26–27		28–29	23–26
Bergischer HC		—	26–37		29–23		29–34			26–25						26–27		
Füchse Berlin			—						33–28			36–37	28–25		33–31			36–30
SG BBM Bietigheim		23–29	31–32	—		34–35				30–35	29–31	29–36	28–36					
ThSV Eisenach	27–36		29–32	31–25	—				28–28				27–28		30–28		28–33	
HC Erlangen	28–34	29–28			28–19	—				30–27	28–28		31–36		33–32			
SG Flensburg-Handewitt	31–25		34–33		33–31	38–33	—	32–27		37–34						40–33		
Frisch Auf Göppingen			31–32	25–29	34–26	32–30		—	25–33				31–32			29–28		
VfL Gummersbach	39–29	38–30					31–30		—		33–29			31–33	31–31			
HSV Hamburg								31–32		—				22–33		28–23	34–34	37–32
TSV Hannover-Burgdorf		27–21					32–39	36–28		30–28	—	26–29				32–31	34–34	
TBV Lemgo						28–33	30–39	28–26	34–36	34–30		—		28–31				31–27
THW Kiel							31–31		29–26	26–19	29–26	35–27	—			37–36	33–22	31–22
SC Magdeburg			36–32	33–24		35–28	37–29						32–26	—			29–28	38–30
MT Melsungen		33–26		31–31				31–18			28–22			37–34	—		32–27	
Rhein-Neckar Löwen	29–27				29–33				26–31			32–32		23–31	30–28	—		
TVB Stuttgart		30–29	33–34	39–29								27–30					—	31–26
HSG Wetzlar				33–35	31–31	30–34			33–36						24–25	30–30		—

Updated to match(es) played on 22 November 2026. Source: HBL
Legend: Blue = home team win; Yellow = draw; Red = away team win.

== Top goalscorers ==
As of 22 November 2026

Rank	Player	Club	Goals	Shots	%
1	(Denmark) Mathias Gidsel	Füchse Berlin	116	166	70
2	(Germany) Kai Häfner	TVB Stuttgart	92	126	73
2	(Germany) Miro Schluroff	VfL Gummersbach	92	149	62
4	(Denmark) Emil Jakobsen	SG Flensburg-Handewitt	90	113	80
5	(Switzerland) Felix Aellen	ThSV Eisenach	87	121	72
6	(Denmark) Simon Pytlick	SG Flensburg-Handewitt	84	126	67
7	(France) Aymeric Minne	SG Flensburg-Handewitt	80	109	73
7	(Germany) Marek Nissen	HC Erlangen	80	122	66
9	(Norway) August Pedersen	TSV Hannover-Burgdorf	79	106	75
10	(Germany) Fynn Hangstein	Bergischer HC	77	111	69
