= Stefan Kneer =

German handball player (born 1985)

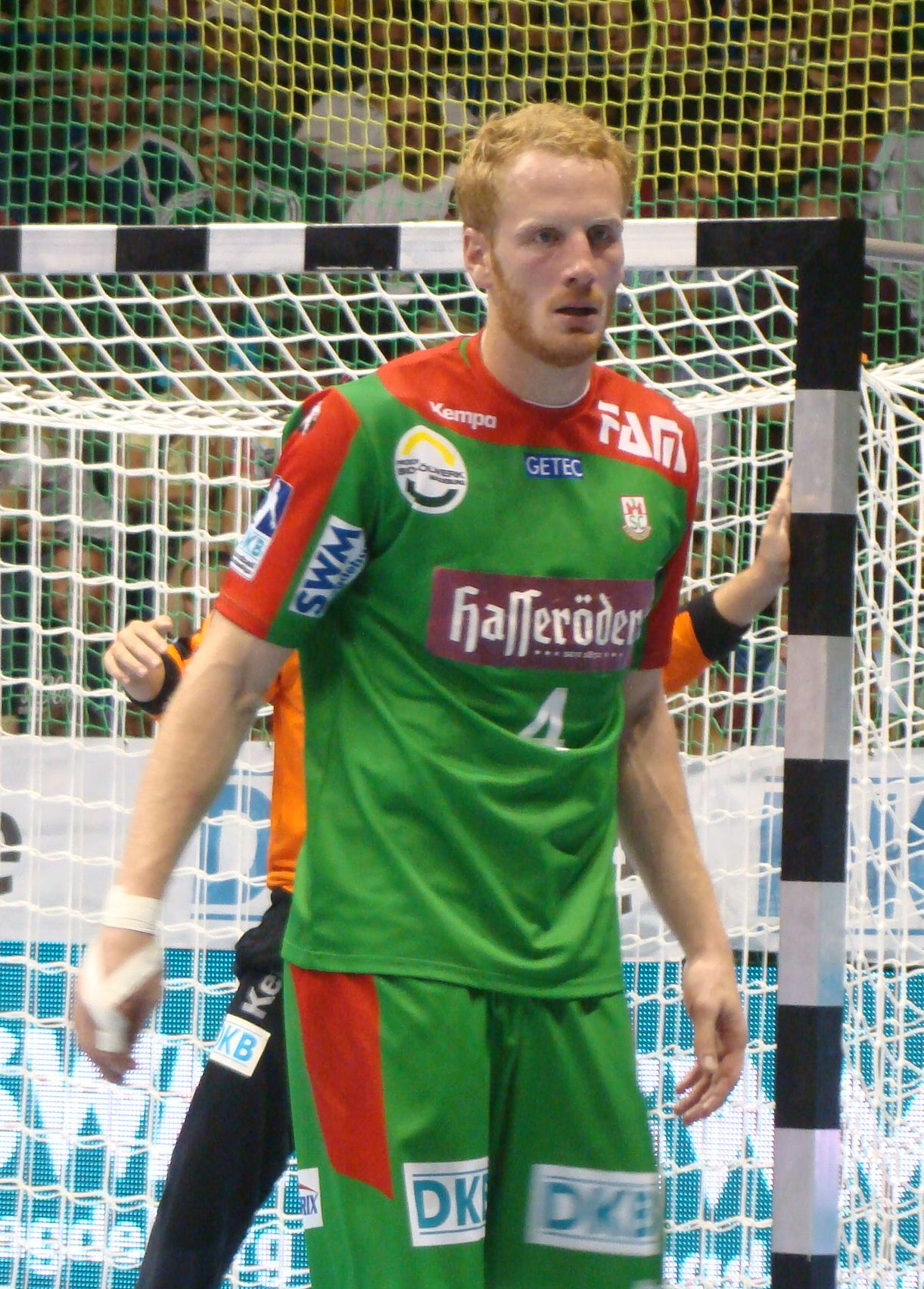

Personal information
- Nationality: German
- Born: 18 December 1985 (age 40) Bühl, West Germany
- Height: 1.94 m (6 ft 4 in)

Sport
- Sport: Handball
- Position: Left back

Senior clubs
- Years: Team
- –2002: BSV Phönix Sinzheim
- 2002–2006: ThSV Eisenach
- 2006–2008: HBW Balingen-Weilstetten
- 2008–2012: TV Großwallstadt
- 2012–2014: SC Magdeburg
- 2014–2016: Rhein-Neckar Löwen
- 2016-2020: HSG Wetzlar
- 2020-2022: TV Hüttenberg
National team
Years	Team	Apps	(Gls)
2007–?	Germany	73	(96)

Teams managed
- 2021-2023: TV Hüttenberg (assistant)

Stefan Kneer (born 19 December 1985) is a German retired handball player and current handball coach. As a player he featured in the German national team.

== Career ==
Kneer started his career at BSV Phönix Sinzheim. He later joined ThSV Eisenach in the second Bundesliga. In 2016 he joined HBW Balingen-Weilstetten in the Bundesliga. In 2008 he joined TV Großwallstadt. After four years he joined SC Magdeburg, where he played for two years before joining Rhein-Neckar Löwen.

In 2020 he joined TV Hüttenberg. In the 2020-2021 he became the assistant coach at the club.
