= Rúnar Sigtryggsson =

Icelandic handball player (born 1972)

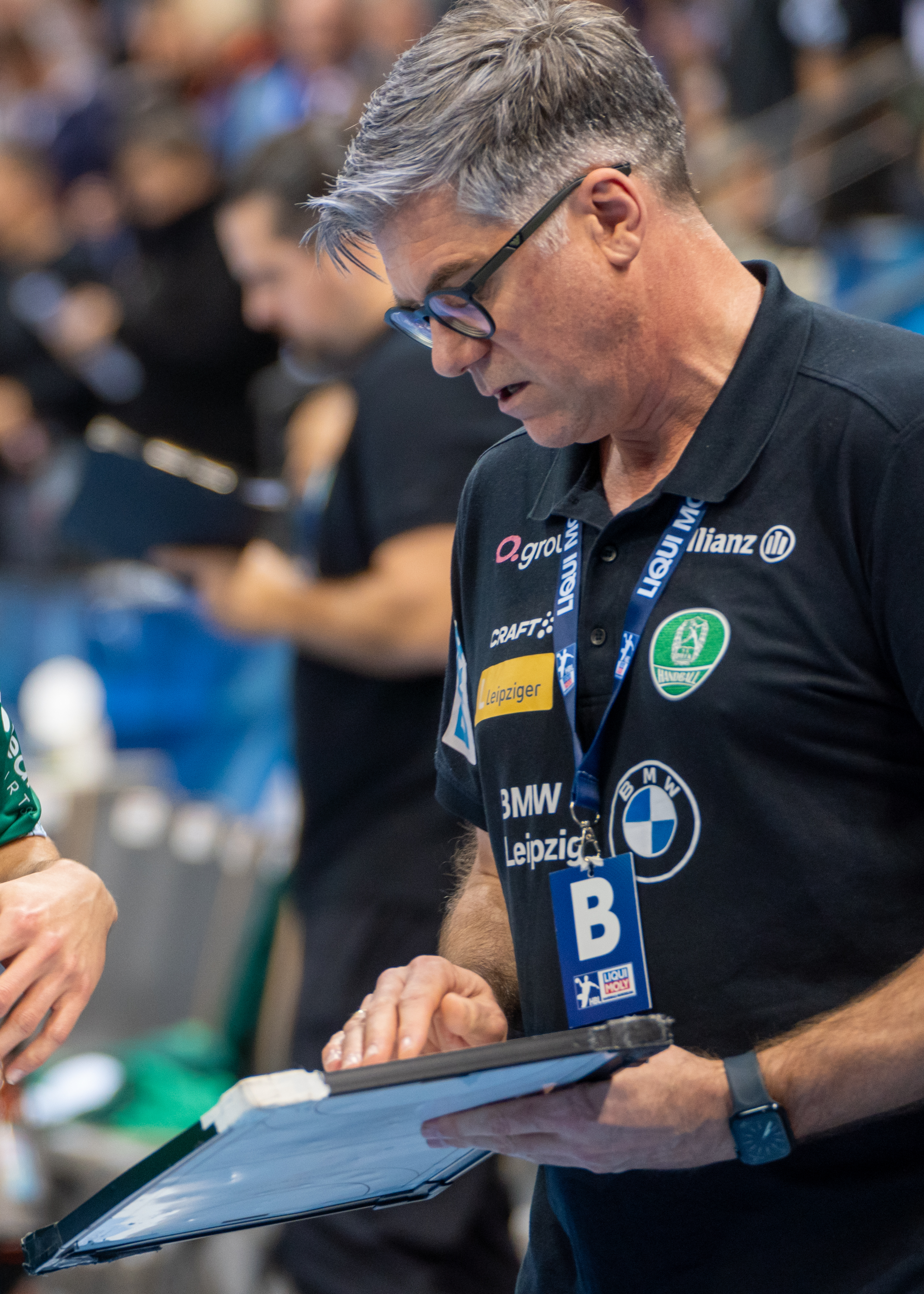
- Sigtryggson in 2024 for SC DHfK Leipzig

Personal information
- Nationality: Icelandic
- Born: 7 April 1972 (age 54) Akureyri, Germany
- Height: 1.94 m (6 ft 4 in)

Sport
- Sport: Handball
- Position: Left back
- Current club: HSG Wetzlar

Senior clubs
- Years: Team
- –2000: Frisch Auf Göppingen
- 2000–2002: Haukar
- 2002–2003: BM Ciudad Real
- 2003–2004: SG Wallau-Massenheim
- 2004–2005: ThSV Eisenach
National team
Years	Team	Apps	(Gls)
–	Iceland	118	(105)

Teams managed
- 2004–2005: ThSV Eisenach
- 2005–2010: Akureyri Handboltafélag
- 2012–2016: EHV Aue
- 2016–2017: HBW Balingen-Weilstetten
- 2020–2021: EHV Aue (interim)
- 2022–2025: SC DHfK Leipzig Handball
- 2022–2025: Haukar
- 2025–: HSG Wetzlar

Rúnar Sigtryggsson (born 7 April 1972) is an Icelandic handball player and coach who is currently coaching HSG Wetzlar.

== Career ==
Sigtryggsson played for Frisch Auf Göppingen in the 2nd Handball-Bundesliga until 2000, where he joined Haukar Hafnarfjörður.

In 2002 he joined Spanish side BM Ciudad Real. In 2003 he returned to Germany, where he signed for SG Wallau-Massenheim.

A year later he signed for ThSV Eisenach in the 2nd Bundesliga, where he replaced Zlatko Feric as the player-coach.

In 2005 he returned to Iceland to become a coach at Akureyri Handboltafélag.

From 2012 to 2016 he was the coach of German second-tier club EHV Aue. He then became the coach of HBW Balingen-Weilstetten. At the end of the season he was however relegated with the team, and he left them in October the following season.

From December 2020 to the end of the 2020–21 season he returned to EHV Aue as the interim coach.

For the 2022–23 season he became the head coach of his former team Haukar Hafnarfjördur. In November the same year he was hired by the German Bundesliga club SC DHfK Leipzig Handball, where he was until the end of the 2024–25 season.

In December 2025 he took over as the head coach of HSG Wetzlar to replace Momir Ilić.

== National team ==
Sigtryggsson played 118 national team games for Iceland and competed in the 2004 Summer Olympics.

== Private ==
He is married to Icelandic former handball national team player Heiða Erlingsdóttir.

His brother, Árni Þór Sigtryggsson, and his sons Sigtryggur Daði Rúnarsson and Andri Már Rúnarsson are also handball players.
