= Kristian Bećiri =

Croatian handball player (born 1994)

Personal information
- Nationality: Croatian
- Born: 14 June 1994 (age 32) Heppenheim, Germany
- Height: 2.02 m (6 ft 8 in)

Sport
- Sport: Handball
- Position: Pivot
- Current club: HSG Bärnbach/Köflach
- Number: 18

Senior clubs
- Years: Team
- –: RK Mornar Crikvenica
- –: MRK Kozala
- 2013–2015: RK Gorenje Velenje
- 2015–2016: RK Maribor Branik
- 2016–2019: RK Celje
- 2019–2020: RK Zagreb
- 2020: ThSV Eisenach
- 2021–2023: HBW Balingen-Weilstetten
- 2023–: HSG Bärnbach/Köflach
National team
Years	Team	Apps	(Gls)
2019–	Croatia	5	(1)

Kristian Bećiri (Albanian: Kristijan Beqiri; born 14 June 1994) is a Croatian handball player who plays for HSG Bärnbach/Köflach and the Croatian national team. He is of paternal Albanian and maternal Slovene descent.

He represented Croatia at the 2019 World Men's Handball Championship.
