= Jörg Kunze =

German handball player (born 1968)

Personal information
- Nationality: German
- Born: 20 March 1968 (age 58) Clausthal-Zellerfeld, West Germany

Sport
- Sport: Handball
- Position: Center back

Senior clubs
- Years: Team
- –: Wilhelmsfeld (Odenwald)
- –1995: SG Leutershausen
- 1995–2001: TV Großwallstadt
- 2001–2003: SG Flensburg-Handewitt
- 2003–2005: TV Großwallstadt
- 2005–2007: HBW Balingen-Weilstetten
National team
Years	Team	Apps	(Gls)
1990–2007	Germany	80	(174)

Jörg Kunze (born 20 March 1968) is a German former handball player. He competed in the men's tournament at the 2000 Summer Olympics.

== Titles ==
- DHB-Pokal
  - Winner: 2003
