= Ingason =

Ingason is an Icelandic surname. Notable people with the surname include:

- Birnir Snær Ingason (born 1996), Icelandic footballer
- Daníel Þór Ingason (born 1995), Icelandic handballer
- Kristall Máni Ingason (born 2002), Icelandic footballer
- Sverrir Ingi Ingason (born 1993), Icelandic footballer
