= Mateusz Kornecki =

Polish handball player (born 1994)

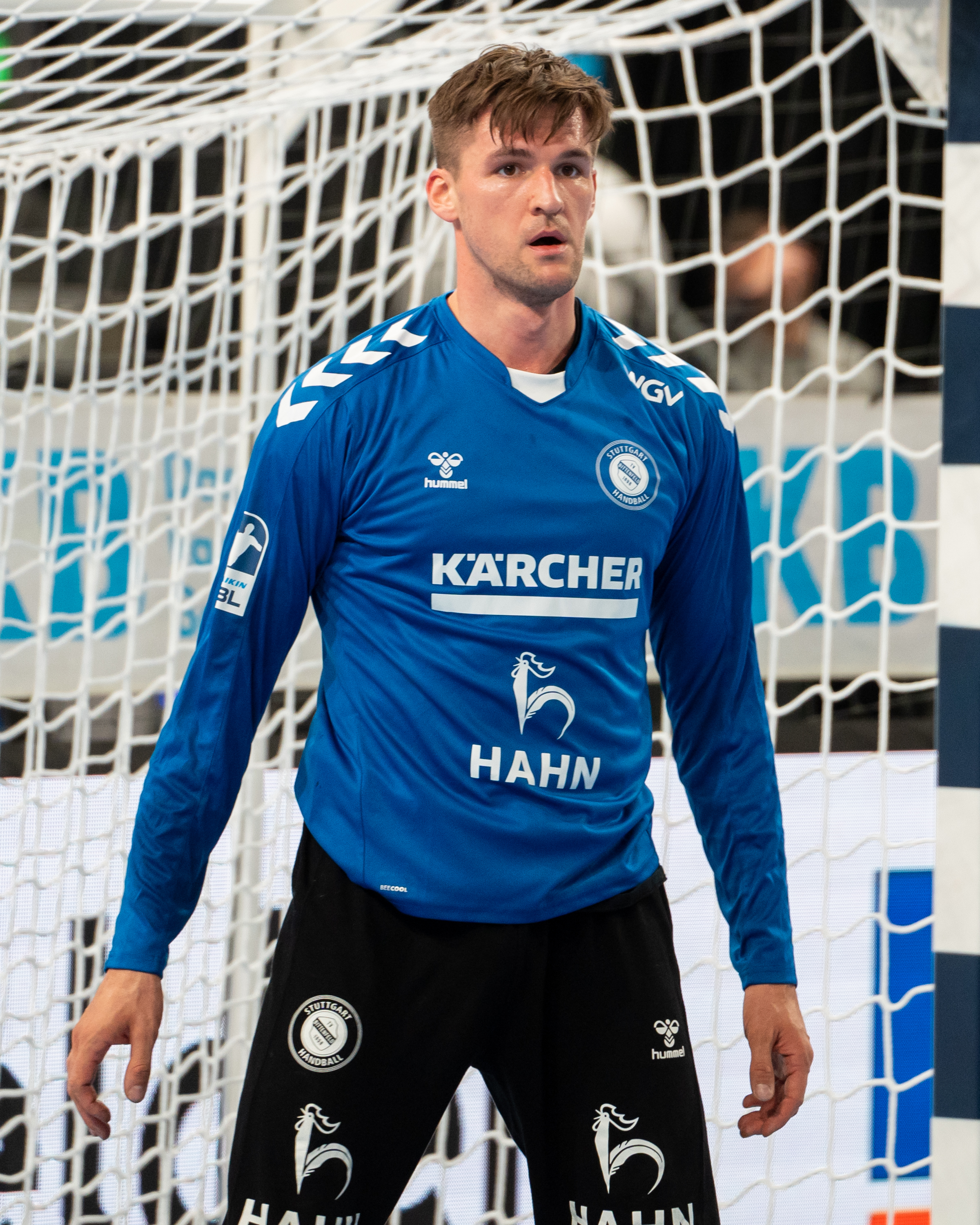

Personal information
- Nationality: Polish
- Born: 5 June 1994 (age 32) Skarżysko-Kamienna, Poland
- Height: 1.94 m (6 ft 4 in)

Sport
- Sport: Handball
- Position: Goalkeeper
- Current club: ThSV Eisenach

Youth career
- Years: Team
- –2009: KSSPR Końskie

Senior clubs
- Years: Team
- 2009–2013: KSSPR Końskie
- 2013–2019: NMC Górnik Zabrze
- 2019–2023: Barlinek Industria Kielce
- 2023–2024: ThSV Eisenach
- 2024–: HBW Balingen-Weilstetten
National team
Years	Team	Apps	(Gls)
2017–	Poland	60	(4)
- Updated on 2 August 2024

Mateusz Kornecki (born 5 June 1994) is a Polish handball player for ThSV Eisenach and the Polish national team.

He participated at the 2017 World Men's Handball Championship.
