= Dennis Szczęsny =

Polish-German handball player (born 1993)

Personal information
- Nationality: Polish/German
- Born: 22 November 1993 (age 32) Dinslaken, Germany
- Height: 1.97 m (6 ft 6 in)

Sport
- Sport: Handball
- Position: Left back
- Current club: TUSEM Essen
- Number: 22

Youth career
- Years: Team
- –: TV Jahn Hiesfeld
- –: HSC Eintracht Recklinghausen
- –2011: DHC Rheinland

Senior clubs
- Years: Team
- 2011–2012: DHC Rheinland
- 2012–2014: TV Bittenfeld
- 2014–: TUSEM Essen
National team
Years	Team	Apps	(Gls)
2018–	Poland	6	(13)

Dennis Szczęsny (born 22 November 1993) is a Polish/German handball player for TUSEM Essen and the Polish national team.

== Career ==
=== National team ===
He made his debut for the national team on 28 December 2018, in a friendly match against Japan (29:28) where he scored four goals.
