= Daníel Þór Ingason =

Icelandic handball player (born 1995)

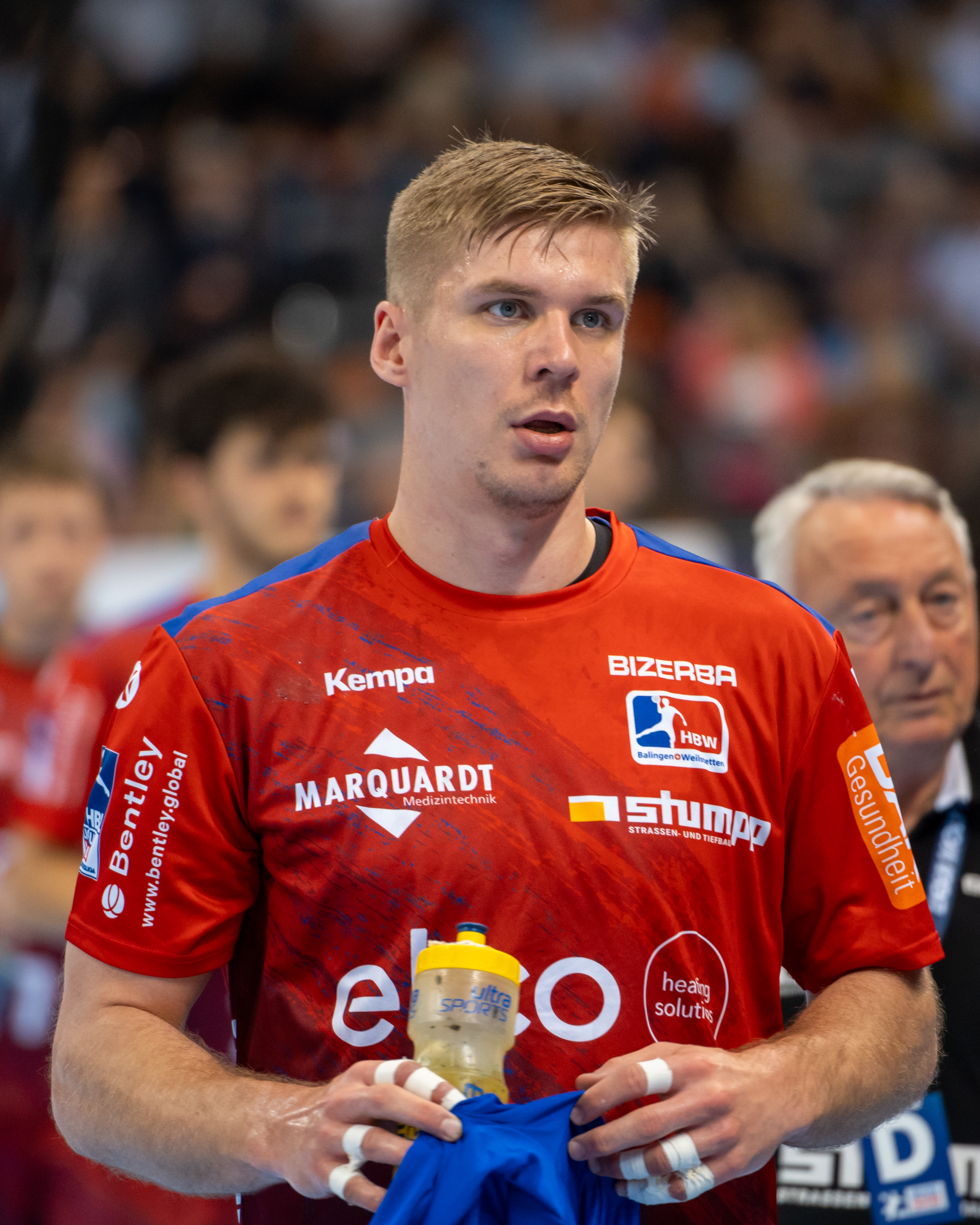

Personal information
- Nationality: Icelandic
- Born: 15 November 1995 (age 30) Reykjavík, Iceland
- Height: 1.96 m (6 ft 5 in)

Sport
- Sport: Handball
- Position: Left back
- Current club: HBW Balingen-Weilstetten
- Number: 10

Youth career
- Years: Team
- –2013: Haukar

Senior clubs
- Years: Team
- 2013–2016: Valur
- 2016–2019: Haukar
- 2019–2021: Ribe-Esbjerg HH
- 2021–: HBW Balingen-Weilstetten
National team
Years	Team	Apps	(Gls)
2017–	Iceland	39	(11)
- Updated on December 2022

Daníel Þór Ingason (born 15 November 1995) is an Icelandic handball player for HBW Balingen-Weilstetten and the Icelandic national team.

He represented Iceland at the 2019 World Men's Handball Championship.
