= Kai Häfner =

German handball player (born 1989)

Kai Hafner
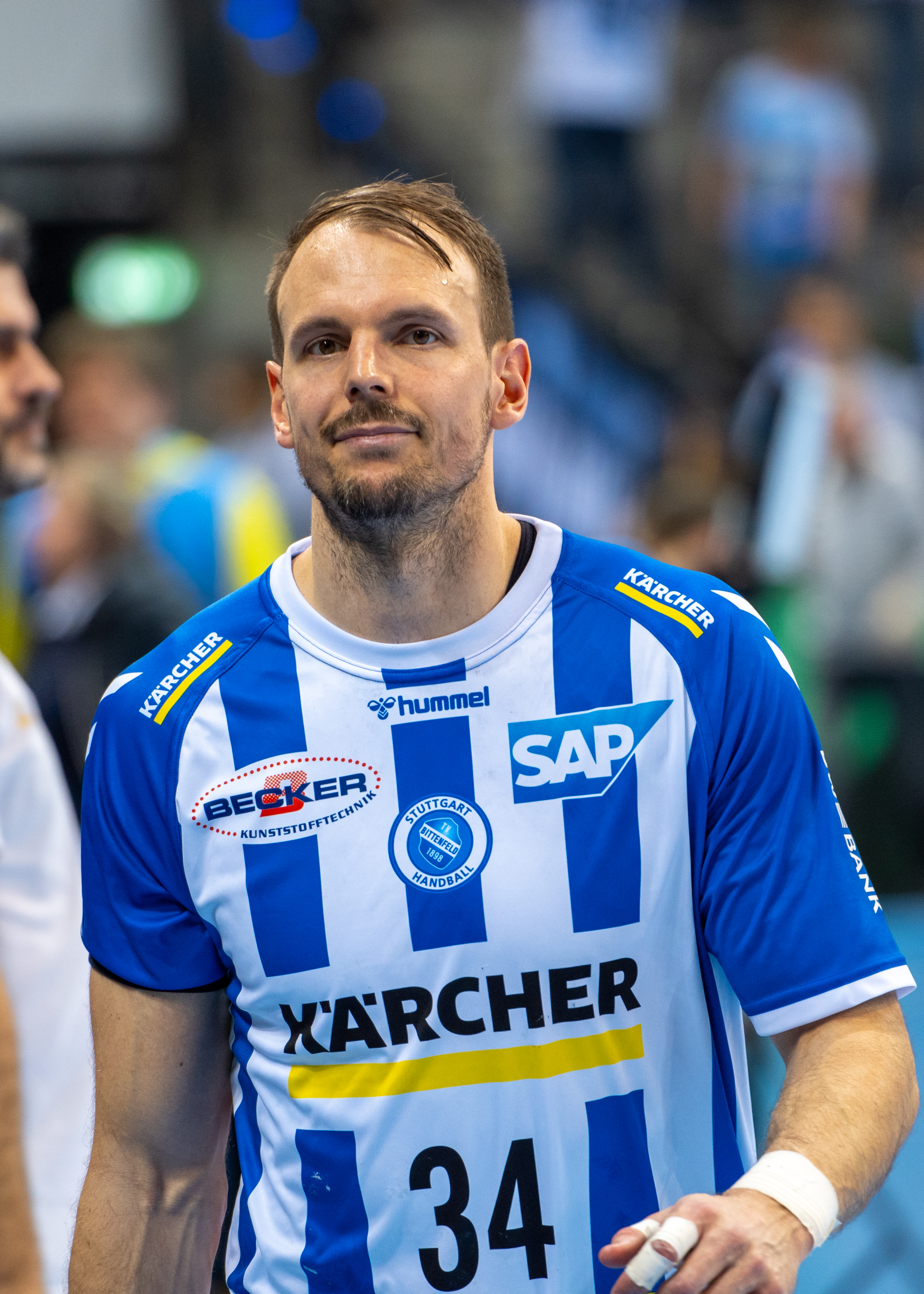
- Häfner in 2024

Personal information
- Nationality: German
- Born: 10 July 1989 (age 37) Schwäbisch Gmünd, West Germany
- Height: 1.92 m (6 ft 4 in)

Sport
- Sport: Handball
- Position: Right back
- Current club: TVB Stuttgart
- Number: 34

Youth career
- Years: Team
- –: TSB Schwäbisch Gmünd

Senior clubs
- Years: Team
- –2006: TSB Schwäbisch Gmünd
- 2006–2007: TV Bittenfeld
- 2007–2011: Frisch Auf Göppingen
- 2011–2014: HBW Balingen-Weilstetten
- 2014–2019: TSV Hannover-Burgdorf
- 2019–2023: MT Melsungen
- 2023–: TVB Stuttgart
National team
Years	Team	Apps	(Gls)
2010–	Germany	139	(335)
Medal record
Olympic Games
Silver medal – second place	2024 Paris	Team
Bronze medal – third place	2016 Rio de Janeiro	Team
European Championship
Gold medal – first place	2016 Poland
- Updated on 18 January 2024

Kai Häfner (born 10 July 1989) is a German handball player for TVB Stuttgart and the German national team.

He participated at the 2019 World Men's Handball Championship.

== Club career ==
Häfner began his handball career at hometown club TSB Schwäbisch Gmünd, before moving to 2. Bundesliga side TV Bittenfeld in 2006. Having switched to Frisch Auf Göppingen the following year, Häfner would spend four seasons playing for the Swabians, with whom he won the DHB-Pokal in 2011.

The German switched to fellow Bundesliga club HBW Balingen-Weilstetten in 2011. After three years, Häfner was once again on the move, switching to TSV Hannover-Burgdorf ahead of the 2014 season.

He went to MT Melsungen in 2019, where he spent four seasons. Having been captain until 2023, Häfner left shortly after his role was allocated to Timo Kastening.

In 2023, Häfner returned to the now renamed TVB Stuttgart.

== International career ==
Häfner won the silver medal with the German junior national team at the 2008 European Championships. A year later, he won gold at the Junior World Championships. On 15 April 2010, he made his debut for the men's national team in a match against Denmark.

At the 2016 European Championships in Poland, he was called up for the last game of the main round (against Russia) after Steffen Weinhold was injured. The team won the title against Spain, to which Häfner contributed with a total of 15 goals in three games. These included the winning goal in the final seconds of the game in the 34:33 victory over Norway in the semi-final.

At the 2016 Olympic Games in Rio de Janeiro, he won the bronze medal with the German team. He was awarded the Silver Laurel Leaf by the Federal President on 1 November 2016. He was called up to the 20-man squad for the 2018 European Championships by national coach Christian Prokop and took part in the preparations. He was called up to the final squad on 7 January and took part in the 2018 European Championships. Häfner also took part in the Olympic Games in Tokyo.

Having scored eleven goals in the first two games, Häfner was ruled out of the tournament after a positive COVID-19 test. At the 2023 World Cup, he and the team finished fifth, with Häfner scoring 28 goals.

== Achievements ==
- Summer Olympics:
  - Bronze: 2016
  - Silver: 2024
- European Championship:
  - Gold: 2016
