= ASV Hamm-Westfalen =

German handball club

ASV Hamm-Westfalen e.V.
- Short name: ASV
- Founded: 1904
- Arena: Westpress Arena
- Capacity: 2,650
- President: Friedhelm Degen
- Head coach: Michael Lerscht
- League: 2. Handball-Bundesliga
- 2022–23: 18th of 18 (relegated)
- Club colours
| Home | Away |

ASV Hamm-Westfalen e.V. is a handball club from Hamm in North Rhine-Westphalia, Germany. They play in 2. Handball-Bundesliga, the second highest division of German handball, after relegation from the Handball-Bundesliga in the 2022-23 season. The club play their home matches at Westpress Arena.

== Accomplishments ==
- 2. Handball-Bundesliga:
  - Gold: 2010
  - Silver: 2021
- Handball-Regionalliga West:
  - Gold: 2005
- Oberliga Westfalen:
  - Gold: 2003

== Team ==
=== Current squad ===
Squad for the 2022–23 season

Goalkeepers

- 1 (Germany) Felix Hertlein
- 21 (Croatia) Vladimir Božić
- 76 (Germany) Jan Wesemann

Left wingers

- 3 (Germany) Fabian Huesmann
- 14 (Germany) Alexander Schulze

Right wingers

- 26 (Germany) Jan Pretzewosky
- 96 (Germany) Tim Roman Wieling

Line players

- 15 (Netherlands) Lars Kooij
- 31 (Germany) Benjamin Meschke
- 99 (Germany) Stefan Bauer

Left backs

- 6 (Germany) Markus Fuchs
- 9 (Estonia) Mait Patrail
- 29 (Germany) Marian Orlowski
- 77 (Greece) Savvas Savvas

Centre Backs

- 11 (Germany) Niko Bratzke
- 23 (Germany) Björn Zintel
- 27 (Germany) Florian Schöße
- 34 (Israel) Yonatan Dayan

Right backs

- 28 (Germany) Andreas Bornemann
- 95 (Germany) Jan von Boenigk

=== Transfers ===
Transfers for the 2026–27 season

Joining

- (Luxembourg) Vincent Kreiselmaier (CB) from (Germany) OHV Aurich
- (Hungary) Ádám Horváth-Garaba (LB) from (Hungary) Ferencvárosi TC
- (Denmark) Sigurt Leth Klinge (CB) from (United States) New York Athletic Club
- (Croatia) Aleksandar Čaprić (LB) from (Germany) ThSV Eisenach
- (Germany) Max Öhler (LW) from (Germany) VfL Eintracht Hagen

Leaving

- (Slovenia) Gašper Horvat (LB)
- (Germany) Niklas Gautzsch (LB) to (Germany) TuS N-Lübbecke
- (Germany) Jan Brosch (LP) (retires)

=== Transfer History ===
Transfers for the 2025–26 season

Joining

- (Poland) Paweł Krawczyk (CB) from (Poland) Górnik Zabrze
- (Croatia) Ivan Budalić (GK) from (Germany) HSG Nordhorn-Lingen
- (Germany) Lucas Firnhaber (RB) from (Germany) HSG Nordhorn-Lingen
- (Germany) Jan Brosch (LP) from (Germany) TBV Lemgo
- (Germany) Benedikt Kühn (CB) from (Germany) GWD Minden
- (United States) (Hungary) Benjámin Edwards (CB) from (Hungary) ONE Veszprém U21

Leaving

- (Israel) Yonatan Dayan (CB) to (Germany) HBW Balingen-Weilstetten
- (Czech Republic) Jakub Štěrba (RW) to (Germany) GWD Minden
- (United States) (Germany) Ian Hüter (CB) to (Germany) HSG Nordhorn-Lingen
- (Austria) Marc-Andre Haunold (LB) to (Austria) Alpla HC Hard
- (Netherlands) Tom Jansen (RB) to (Germany) TuS Ferndorf
- (Germany) Jonas Stüber (LP) to (Greece) AEK Athens
- (Germany) Julius Meyer-Siebert (LB) to (Germany) TuS Ferndorf
- (Germany) Philip Jungemann (LP) to (Germany) VfL Eintracht Hagen
