= 2. Handball-Bundesliga =

German handball league

- Founded: 1981; 45 years ago
- Administrator: Handball-Bundesliga e.V.
- No. of teams: 18
- Country: Germany
- Confederation: EHF
- Most recent champions: HBW Balingen-Weilstetten (2025–26)
- Most titles: TuS Nettelstedt-Lübbecke (5 titles)
- Level on pyramid: Level 2
- Promotion to: Handball-Bundesliga
- Relegation to: 3. Liga
- Domestic cup: DHB-Pokal
- Website: daikin-hbl.de

The 2. Handball-Bundesliga is the second tier of professional handball in Germany.

== Season ==
It is directly linked to the Handball-Bundesliga, the country's highest tier, by a promotion and relegation system. Before the 2011–12 season, the league played in two regional groups (north and south), since then it has been playing in a nationwide single division format.

== Relegation and promotion ==
The top two placed teams are promoted to the Handball-Bundesliga for the next season. The two last placed teams are relegated to the 3. Liga.

== Clubs ==
Teams for season 2024–25

Locations of the 2024–25 Handball-Bundesliga teams

Team	Location	Arena	Capacity
ASV Hamm-Westfalen	Hamm	Westpress Arena	2,650
Bergischer HC	Solingen	Klingenhalle Solingen	2,491
Dessau-Rosslauer HV 06	Dessau-Roßlau	Anhalt Arena Dessau	3,300
Eulen Ludwigshafen	Ludwigshafen	Friedrich-Ebert-Halle	2,268
GWD Minden	Minden	Kampa-Halle	4,059
HBW Balingen-Weilstetten	Balingen	Sparkassen-Arena	2,320
HC Elbflorenz Dresden	Dresden	BallsportArena Dresden	3,000
HSC 2000 Coburg	Coburg	HUK-COBURG arena	3,530
HSG Konstanz	Konstanz	Schänzle-Sporthalle Konstanz	1,900
HSG Nordhorn-Lingen	Nordhorn	Euregium; EmslandArena	4,100; 4,995
TSV Bayer Dormagen	Dormagen	TSV Bayer Sportcenter	2,000
TuS Ferndorf	Kreuztal	Dreifachhalle Stählerwiese	1,500
TuS N-Lübbecke	Lübbecke	Merkur Arena	2,500
TUSEM Essen	Essen	Sportpark am Hallo	2,578
TV Hüttenberg	Hüttenberg	Sporthalle Hüttenberg	1,600
TV Grosswallstadt	Großwallstadt	Untermainhalle	2,500
VfL Eintracht Hagen	Hagen	Krollmann Arena	3,145
VfL Lübeck-Schwartau	Bad Schwartau	Hansehalle	3,200

== Total titles won ==
Club	Winners	Years
TuS Nettelstedt-Lübbecke	5	1994, 2002, 2004, 2009, 2017
Bergischer HC	4	2011, 2013, 2018, 2025
HBW Balingen-Weilstetten	4	2006, 2019, 2023, 2026
GWD Minden	3	1982, 1995, 2012
HSG Düsseldorf	3	1984, 2004, 2009
TSV Bayer Dormagen	3	1987, 1999, 2008
VfL Hameln	3	1986, 1991, 2000
VfL Bad Schwartau	3	1990, 1993, 1998
TSG Friesenheim	2	2010, 2014
Eintracht Hildesheim	2	2006, 2011
Stralsunder HV	2	2003, 2008
OSC 04 Rheinhausen	2	1993, 1995
TV Eitra	2	1991, 1994
SG Flensburg-Handewitt	2	1988, 1992
SG Leutershausen	2	1988, 1990
SG Wallau/Massenheim	2	1984, 1987
1. VfL Potsdam	1	2024
VfL Gummersbach	1	2022
Handball Sport Verein Hamburg	1	2021
HSC 2000 Coburg	1	2020
HC Erlangen	1	2016
SC DHfK Leipzig	1	2015
ASV Hamm-Westfalen	1	2010
Füchse Berlin	1	2007
TUSEM Essen	1	2007
1. SV Concordia Delitzsch	1	2005
MT Melsungen	1	2005
Rhein-Neckar Löwen	1	2003
VfL Pfullingen	1	2002
SV Post Schwerin	1	2001
Frisch Auf Göppingen	1	2001
SG Solingen	1	2000
HSG Nordhorn-Lingen	1	1999
HSG Wetzlar	1	1998
LTV Wuppertal	1	1997
ThSV Eisenach	1	1997
VfL Fredenbeck	1	1996
TuS Schutterwald	1	1996
SG Stuttgart-Scharnhausen	1	1993
VfL Eintracht Hagen	1	1992
TuS Eintracht Wiesbaden	1	1992
DSC Wanne-Eickel	1	1989
TV Niederwürzbach	1	1989
TSV Milbertshofen	1	1986
OSC Dortmund	1	1985
VfL Günzburg	1	1984
HC TuRa Bergkamen	1	1983
TuSpo Nürnberg	1	1983
MTSV Schwabing	1	1982
