= HSG Nordhorn-Lingen =

German handball club

- Full name: Handballspielgemeinschaft Nordhorn-Lingen
- Founded: June 1, 1981; 45 years ago
- Arena: Euregium (Nordhorn); EmslandArena (Lingen)
- Capacity: 4,100; 4,995
- Head coach: Mark Bult
- League: 2. Handball-Bundesliga
- 2020–21: Handball-Bundesliga, 18th (relegated)
- Club colours
Home	Away

HSG Nordhorn-Lingen (HSG Nordhorn until September 2008) is a handball club from Nordhorn, Germany. As of the season 2021/22 HSG Nordhorn-Lingen competes in the 2. Handball-Bundesliga.

In 2008 the club won the EHF Cup, which was their first and to date only international title.

The club also has a women's team, that plays in the Oberliga.

== History ==
The club was founded on June 1, 1981 under the name HSG Nordhorn. It was founded as a fusion of Eintracht Nordhorn and Sparta Nordhorn. They were promoted to the Bundesliga for the first time in 1997.

In 2008 they won the EHF Cup, but only a few months later they had financial issues, and had to change their name to the current HSG Nordhorn-Lingen after donations from the city of Lingen. On February 16, 2009 the company behind the club declared bankruptcy, and the club was therefore administratively relegated after the 2008-09 season.

In the 2018-19 season the club was promoted to the Bundesliga once again by finishing second in the second Bundesliga. They survived one season, but in 2020-21 they were relegated once again.

== Crest, colours, supporters ==
=== Kits ===
HOME
2011–12	2013–14	2014-16	2017–18	2019–20	2020-21

== Team ==
=== Current squad ===
Squad for the 2025–26 season

HSG Nordhorn-Lingen

Goalkeepers
Left wingers
Right wingers
Line players

- (Germany) Christian Wilhelm

Left backs

- (Sweden) Oscar Gentzel

Centre Backs

- (United States) (Germany) Ian Hüter

Right backs

=== Technical staff ===
- Head coach: (Netherlands) Mark Bult

=== Transfers ===
Transfers for the 2026–27 season

Joining

- (Poland) Kacper Ligarzewski (GK) from (Poland) KPR Ostrovia Ostrów Wielkopolski
- (Netherlands) Emiel Hoogland (CB) from (Netherlands) Hurry-Up
- (Germany) Johannes Thiel (RB) from (Germany) TSV Hannover-Burgdorf
- (Germany) Maximilian Horner (RB) from (Germany) TV Großwallstadt
- (Germany) Valentino Duvančić (LP) from (Germany) TuS Ferndorf

Leaving

- (Denmark) Kristian van der Merwe (GK) to (Germany) Bergischer HC
- (Germany) Frieder Bandlow (RB) to (Germany) HC Erlangen
- (Germany) Björn Zintel (CB) to (Germany) TV Emsdetten
- (Germany) Jaris Tobeler (RB) to (Germany) TV Emsdetten

=== Transfer History ===
Transfers for the 2025–26 season

Joining

- (United States) (Germany) Ian Hüter (CB) from (Germany) ASV Hamm-Westfalen
- (Sweden) Oscar Gentzel (LB) from (Sweden) Alingsås HK
- (Germany) Christian Wilhelm (LP) from (Germany) TUSEM Essen

Leaving

- (Slovakia) Dominik Kalafut (LP) to (Germany) TuS Vinnhorst
- (Croatia) Ivan Budalić (GK) to (Germany) ASV Hamm-Westfalen
- (Germany) Lucas Firnhaber (RB) to (Germany) ASV Hamm-Westfalen
- (Germany) Georg Pöhle (LB) to (Germany) HBW Balingen-Weilstetten
- (Germany) Stefan Bauer (LP) to (Germany) HBW Balingen-Weilstetten
- (Germany) Luke Stricker (LB) to (Germany) OHV Aurich
- (Germany) Fynn Lügering (LB) to (Netherlands) Hurry-Up
- (Germany) Mika Sajenev (LP) to (Germany) GWD Minden
