= TV Hüttenberg =

German handball club

- Full name: Turnverein 05/07 Hüttenberg e.V.
- Short name: TVH
- Founded: January 1, 1969; 57 years ago
- Arena: Sporthalle Gießen-Ost, Gießen
- Capacity: 4,003
- President: Markus Happel
- League: 2. Handball-Bundesliga
- 2024–25: 3rd

TV Hüttenberg is a German handball club from Hüttenberg, Germany, that plays in the 2. Handball-Bundesliga.

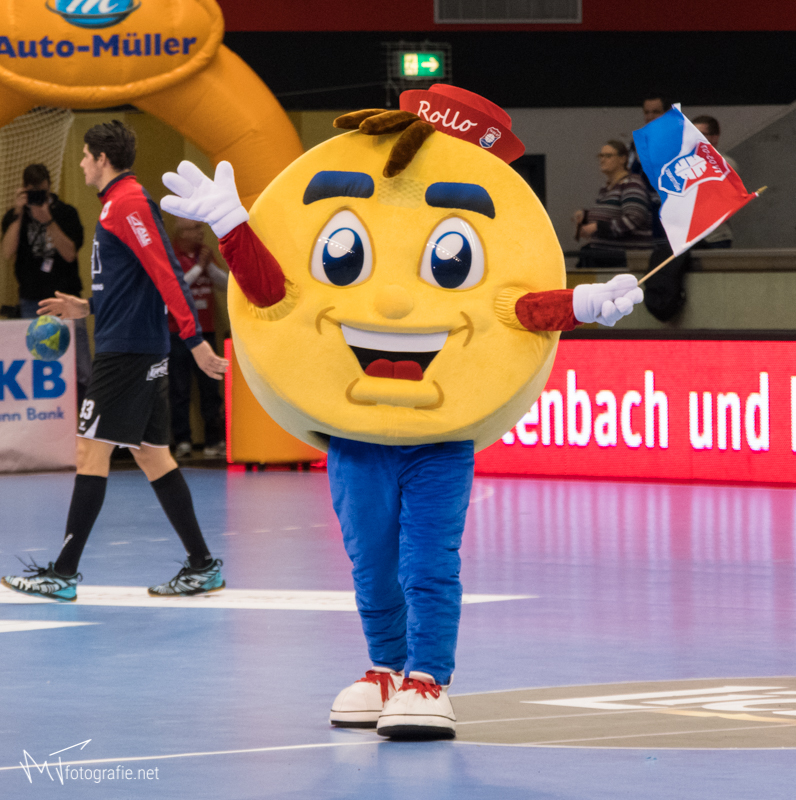
Rollo – the official mascot of TV Hüttenberg.

== History ==
The club was founded on January 1, 1969 as a fusion between TV Hochelheim (founded 1905) and TV Hörnsheim (founded 1907).

Midway through the 2017-18 season, the club introduced an official maskot for the first time, Rollo.

In 2018 they were relegated to the 2. Bundesliga, where they have played since.

=== Rivalry ===
TV Hüttenberg's arch-rival is the neighbouring club HSG Wetzlar and games between the clubs are considered as the "Mittelhessenderby".

== Crest, colours, supporters ==
=== Kits ===
HOME
2011-12	2017–18

AWAY
2009-10	2010-11	2011-12	2017–18

== Team ==
=== Current squad ===
Squad for the 2026–27 season

Goalkeepers

- 12 (Germany) Simon Böhne
- 55 (Israel) Yahav Shamir

Left Wingers

- 3 (Germany) Philipp Schwarz
- 17 (Germany) Phil Spandau

Right Wingers

- 18 (Germany) Tim Rüdiger
- 32 (Germany) Leon Stehl

Line players

- 11 (Germany) Lasse Ohl
- 19 (Czech Republic) Vít Reichl
- (Germany) Julius Gümbel
- (Germany) Georg Löwen

Left Backs

- 20 (Germany) Leif Haack

Central Backs

- 10 (Germany) Paul Ohl
- 25 (Germany) Torsten Anselm
- 51 (Germany) Hendrik Schreiber
- (Germany) David Sehnke

Right Backs

- 47 (Germany) Danil Dyatlov
- 97 (Germany) David Kuntscher

=== Transfers ===
Transfers for the 2026–27 season

Joining

- (Germany) David Sehnke (CB) from (Germany) HC Erlangen
- (Germany) Phil Spandau (LW) from (Germany) HSG Wetzlar
- (Germany) Julius Gümbel (LP) from (Germany) HSG Wetzlar
- (Germany) Georg Löwen (LP) on loan from (Germany) HSG Wetzlar

Leaving

- (Germany) Paul Kompenhans (CB) to (Germany) HSG Wetzlar
- (Germany) Moritz Zörb (LP) (retires)

=== Transfer History ===
Transfers for the 2025–26 season

Joining

- (Germany) Danil Dyatlov (RB) from (Germany) HBW Balingen-Weilstetten
- (Germany) Torsten Anselm (CB) from (Germany) SG Pforzheim/Eutingen
- (Germany) Leon Stehl (RW) on loan from (Germany) MT Melsungen

Leaving

- (Germany) Finn Rüspeler (GK) to (Germany) HSG Krefeld
- (Germany) Niklas Theiss (RB) to (Germany) HSG Wetzlar
- (Germany) Tristan Kirschner (RW) to (Germany) HSG Wetzlar
- (Germany) Johannes Klein (LB) to (Germany) HSG Linden
