= TUSEM Essen =

German handball club

- Full name: TUSEM Sport und Marketing GmbH
- Founded: 2000; 26 years ago
- Arena: Sportpark am Hallo
- Capacity: 2,578
- President: Frank Schienbein
- Head coach: Michael Hegemann
- League: 2. Handball-Bundesliga
- 2024–25: 16th
- Club colours
Home	Away

TUSEM Essen is a handball club from Essen, Germany. Currently, they compete in the 2. Handball-Bundesliga.

== History ==
The history of Tusem Essen began in the 1960's with 6 promotions in 7 years, where they reached the Oberliga in 1971-72. In 1976 Klaus Schorn took over as coach and guided them to the Bundesliga for the second time, where they played for the next 26 years.

In 1986 they won the German Championship for the first time under the Romanian coach Petre Ivănescu, followed by the DHB-Pokal in 1988, beating SG Wallau-Massenheim in the final 25-18 and 28-21.

In 1994 they won the inaugural edition of the EHF City Cup.

The professional handball team broke out from the club in 2000 and was transformed into its own company.

In 2004 the main sponsor left the team, which meant economic uncertainty that culminated in a forced relegation to the Regionalliga. As they had just won the EHF Cup in 2005, this meant that they played in the EHF Cup Winners' Cup as a third division team.

The team achieved 2 promotions and was back in the Bundesliga for the 2007-08 season. They finished 16th, and won the relegation play-off against HSG Düsseldorf. However they had to declare insolvency on November 4th the following season and was thus relegated.

In 2020 they were promoted to the Bundesliga again, but only a season later they were relegated.

== Accomplishments ==
- Handball-Bundesliga: 3
  - Gold: 1986, 1987, 1989
- DHB-Pokal: 3
  - Gold: 1988, 1991, 1992
- EHF Champions League: 1
  - Silver: 1988
- EHF Cup Winner's Cup: 1
  - Gold: 1989
- EHF Cup: 1
  - Gold: 2005
- EHF Challenge Cup: 1
  - Gold: 1994

== Team ==
=== Current squad ===
Squad for the 2022–23 season

Goalkeepers

- 1 (Germany) Arne Fuchs
- 12 (Germany) Sebastian Bliß
- 16 (Germany) Lukas Diedrich

Left wingers

- 68 (Germany) Tim Michel Mast
- 73 (Germany) Finley Werschkull

Right wingers

- 21 (Germany) Felix Eißing
- 34 (Germany) Felix Klingler

Line players

- 10 (Germany) Finn Wolfram
- 14 (Germany) Markus Dangers

Left backs

- 3 (Germany) Jonas Ellwanger
- 22 (Poland) Dennis Szczęsny
- 28 (Germany) Malte Seidel

Centre backs

- 15 (Germany) Nils Homscheid
- 25 (Germany) Justin Müller
- 33 (Germany) Eloy Morante Maldonado

Right backs

- 8 (Slovenia) Tim Rozman
- 77 (Germany) Alexander Schoss

=== Transfers ===
Transfers for the 2026–27 season

Joining

- (Bosnia and Herzegovina) Adin Faljić (LP) from (Germany) SG Flensburg-Handewitt
- (Germany) Lukas Diedrich (GK) from (Germany) Bergischer HC
- (Germany) Nicholas Schley (LP) from (Germany) 1. VfL Potsdam

Leaving

- (Germany) Dominik Plaue (GK) (retires)
- (Germany) Alexander Becker (LP) to (Germany) VfL Eintracht Hagen
- (Germany) Luis Buschhaus (CB) to (Germany) Eintracht Hildesheim
- (Germany) Valentin Clarius (LP) to (Germany) Münchner Panther
- (Germany) Finn Wolfram (LP)

=== Transfer History ===
Transfers for the 2025–26 season

Joining

- (Germany) Maximilian Hejny (RB) from (Germany) SG BBM Bietigheim
- (Germany) Valentin Willner (LP) from (Germany) Rhein-Neckar Löwen
- (Germany) Alexander Becker (LP) from (Germany) VfL Eintracht Hagen
- (Germany) Tom Wolf (LB) from (Germany) MT Melsungen
- (Germany) Felix Mart (CB) from (Germany) Füchse Berlin
- (Germany) Finn Knaack (GK) on loan from (Germany) HSV Hamburg

Leaving

- (Poland) (Germany) Dennis Szczęsny (LB) to (Germany) HSG Am Hallo
- (Switzerland) Dennis Wipf (GK) to (Germany) VfL Eintracht Hagen
- (Hungary) Lev Szuharev (RB) to (Germany) Wölfe Würzburg
- (Germany) Mats Haberkamp (GK) to (Germany) GWD Minden
- (Germany) Christian Wilhelm (LP) to (Germany) HSG Nordhorn-Lingen
- (Germany) Fynn-Lukas Hermeling (LB) to (Germany) TuS Vinnhorst
- (Germany) Louis Elsässer (LW) to (Germany) HSG Bergische Panther
- (Germany) Jan Weiss (LP) to (Germany) Ahlener SG
