= TV Großwallstadt =

German handball club

- Full name: TV Großwallstadt 1888 e.V. (club); TV Grosswallstadt GmbH (men's handball playing firm)
- Short name: TV Großwallstadt
- Founded: 1888; 138 years ago
- Arena: Untermainhalle Elsenfeld
- Capacity: 2,500
- President: Stefan Wüst
- Head coach: Vyacheslav Lochman
- League: 2.Bundesliga
- 2023–24: 14th
- Club colours
Home	Away

TV Großwallstadt is a team handball club from Großwallstadt, Lower Franconia. Currently, TV Großwallstadt competes in the 2. Bundesliga and the DHB-Pokal. The club has seen great success, especially from the late 1970s until the early 1990s.

For the 2015-16 the team could obtain a license to play in the second bundesliga, and the team was refounded on 22 July 2015. The team restarted in the third tier.

Location of TV Großwallstadt

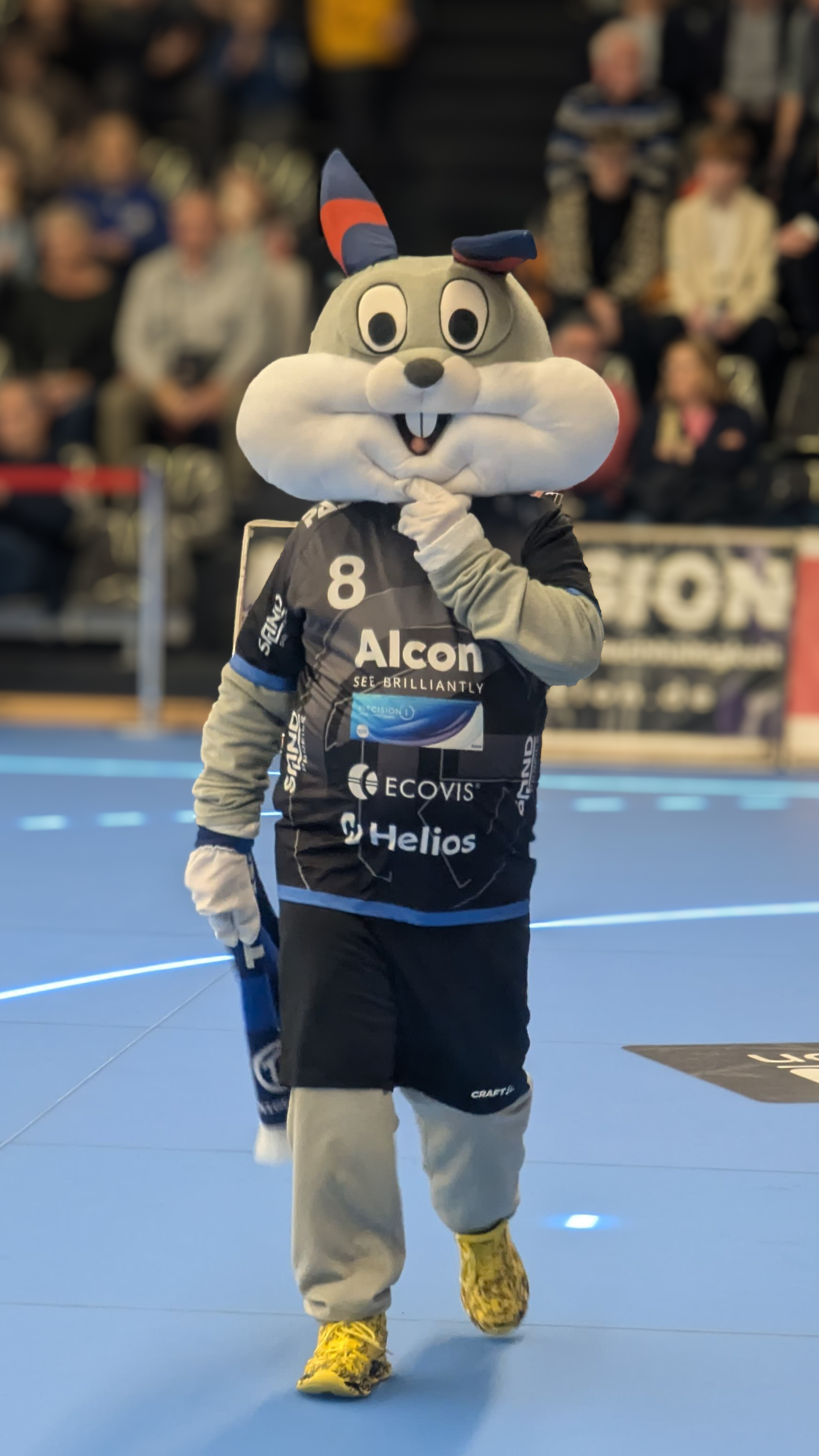
Hobtsi – the official mascot of TV Großwallstadt.

== Crest, colours ==
=== Kit manufacturers ===
Period	Kit manufacturer
present	(Denmark) Hummel

=== Kits ===
HOME
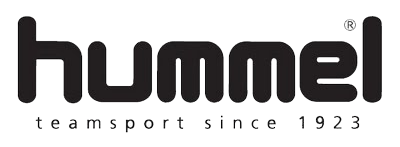
2022–23

AWAY
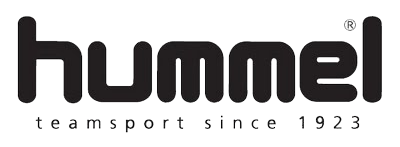
2022–23

== Achievements ==
=== Domestic ===
- Handball-Bundesliga
  - Gold: 1978, 1979, 1980, 1981, 1984, 1990
- DHB-Pokal
  - Gold: 1980, 1984, 1987, 1989
- Double
  - Winners (2): 1979–80, 1983–84

=== International ===
- EHF Champions League
  - Gold: 1979, 1980
- EHF Cup Winners' Cup
  - Silver: 1986, 1988
- EHF Cup
  - Gold: 1984
- EHF European Cup
  - Gold: 2000

== Team ==
=== Current squad ===
Squad for the 2022–23 season

TV Großwallstadt

Goalkeepers

- 1 (Greece) Petros Boukovinas
- 16 (Germany) Jan-Steffen Minerva
- 68 (Germany) Julian Ohm

Left wingers

- 6 (Germany) Moritz Klenk
- 8 (Germany) Florian Eisenträger
- 21 (Ukraine) Ievgen Zhuk

Right wingers

- 9 (Germany) Frieder Bandlow
- 19 (Ukraine) Dmytro Redkyn
- 87 (Germany) Maxim Schalles

Line players

- 44 (Germany) Thomas Rink

Left backs

- 7 (Lithuania) Povilas Babarskas
- 20 (Germany) Finn Wullenweber
- 30 (Germany) Adrian Kammlodt

Centre backs

- 14 (Germany) Kuno Schauer
- 27 (Germany) Mario Stark

Right backs

- 18 (Germany) Simon Strakeljahn
- 28 (Germany) Luca Munzinger
- 77 (Germany) Niklas Ihmer

=== Technical staff ===
- Head coach: (Ukraine) Vyacheslav Lochman
- Team manager: (Germany) Michael Spatz
- Physiotherapist: (Germany) Katrin Büttner
- Physiotherapist: (Germany) Mona Habel
- Club doctor: (Germany) Dr. Christian Baumgärtner

=== Transfers ===
Transfers for the 2026–27 season

Joining

- (Luxembourg) Loïc Kaysen (LB) from (Germany) Longericher Sport Club
- (Slovenia) Žiga Urbič (GK) from (Germany) Eulen Ludwigshafen
- (Germany) Jannek Klein (RB) from (Germany) 1. VfL Potsdam
- (Germany) Ben Horlebein (LW) from (Germany) HSG Rodgau Nieder-Roden
- (Germany) Johan Rohwer (LB) on loan from (Germany) THW Kiel

Leaving

- (Germany) Maxim Schalles (RW) to (Austria) UHK Krems
- (Germany) Finn Wullenweber (LB) to (Germany) TuS N-Lübbecke
- (Germany) Maximilian Horner (RB) to (Germany) HSG Nordhorn-Lingen
- (Germany) Mario Stark (LB) to (Germany) TV Kirchzell
- (Germany) Jan-Steffen Minerva (GK) to (Germany) TV Gelnhausen
- (Germany) Konstantin Knabe (CB) to (Germany) TuSpo Obernburg
- (Germany) Stefan Hanemann (GK)
- (Germany) Leon Nowottny (GK) loan back to (Germany) THW Kiel

=== Transfer History ===
Transfers for the 2025–26 season

Joining

- (Norway) Axel Skaarnæs (LP) from (Norway) Bækkelaget Handball Elite
- (Germany) Ben Connar Battermann (LB) from (Germany) TBV Lemgo
- (Germany) Sebastian Trost (LB) from (Germany) TSG Friesenheim
- (Germany) Leon Nowottny (GK) on loan from (Germany) THW Kiel

Leaving

- (Estonia) Karl Roosna (RW) to (Estonia) Raasiku/Mistra
- (Germany) Lars Röller (LP) to (Germany) TSG Friesenheim
