= HBW Balingen-Weilstetten =

German handball club

- Full name: Handball Balingen-Weilstetten e.V.
- Short name: HBW
- Founded: 2002; 24 years ago
- Arena: Sparkassen-Arena (Balingen); Porsche-Arena (Stuttgart)
- Capacity: 2,320; 6,181
- President: Siegfried Braun
- Head coach: Tobias Hotz (interim)
- League: Handball-Bundesliga
- 2023–24: 18th of 18 (relegated)
- Club colours
Home	Away

HBW Balingen-Weilstetten is a handball club from the city of Balingen, Germany, though they occasionally play in Stuttgart. The team currently plays in the Handball-Bundesliga, Germany's highest handball division.

Location of HBW Balingen-Weilstetten

== History ==
The club was established from the merger in 2002 of the handball sections of TSG Balingen and TV Weilstetten. This merger was quickly beneficial as HBW Balingen-Weilstetten finished first in the regional championship (Regionalliga) and were promoted to 2. Handball-Bundesliga. HBW became champion in 2006, which meant promotion to the Handball-Bundesliga. The merger has been widely perceived to be successful since the club managed to maintain its position in the top division that season thanks to its thirteenth place out of the 18 participants. The following seasons, the results of the club remained rather constant since it avoided relegation each season by ranking between thirteenth and fifteenth place (first non-relegation). At the end of the 2013/14 season, the team was ranked 16th in the table, so it was eliminated from the sports standings but remained in the Bundesliga because HSV Hamburg was not licensed for the 2014/15 season. The license was finally given to HSV Hamburg, so the 2014–2015 Bundesliga was played with 19 clubs. During the 2014/2015 season, the club achieved its best run in the Championship with an eleventh place but was relegated at the end of the 2016/2017 season due to its seventeenth place. Back in 2. Handball-Bundesliga, the club finished fifth in 2018 then champion in 2019, synonymous with a return to the top flight. HBW have remained in the Handball-Bundesliga since 2019 after a fifteenth-placed season in 2020–21.

== Accomplishments ==
- 2. Handball-Bundesliga: 4
  - Gold: 2006, 2019, 2023, 2026
- DHB-Pokal:
  - Bronze: 2025

== Crest, colours, supporters ==
=== Kits ===
HOME
2017–18	2019–20	2020–21

AWAY
2013–14	2015–16	2017–18	2019–20	2020–22

== Team ==
=== Current squad ===
Squad for the 2023–24 season

HBW Balingen-Weilstetten

Goalkeepers

- 12 (Egypt) Mohamed El-Tayar
- 16 (Germany) Mario Ruminsky

Left wingers

- 14 (Iceland) Oddur Grétarsson
- 18 (Germany) Tim Grüner
- 23 (Germany) Mischa Locher
- 27 (Germany) Patrick Volz

Right wingers

- 6 (Italy) Leo Prantner
- 20 (Germany) Tom Hildebrand
- 24 (Germany) Elias Fügel

Line players

- 2 (Croatia) Nikola Grahovac
- 17 (Germany) Felix Danner
- 28 (Germany) Tobias Heinzelmann

Left backs

- 4 (Croatia) Filip Vistorop
- 10 (Iceland) Daníel Þór Ingason
- 22 (Germany) Jona Schoch
- 25 (Germany) Till Wente

Centre Backs

- 7 (Germany) Elias Huber
- 23 (Germany) Mika Schüler
- 26 (Germany) Lukas Saueressig

Right backs

- 5 (Hungary) Csaba Leimeter
- 21 (Germany) Jerome Müller

=== Technical staff ===
- Head coach: (Germany) Tobias Hotz (interim)
- Assistant coach: (Germany) Matthias Flohr
- Athletic Trainer: (Germany) Sascha Ilitsch
- Physiotherapist: (Germany) Wolfgang Kremer-Junk
- Club doctor: (Germany) Dr. Wilfried Gfrörer

=== Transfers ===
Transfers for the 2026–27 season

Joining

- (Serbia) Vladimir Cupara (GK) from (Romania) Dinamo București
- (Germany) Lion Zacharias (LW) from (Germany) HSG Wetzlar

Leaving

- (Hungary) Benedek Nagy (GK) loan back to (Hungary) Telekom Veszprém
- (Germany) Tim Grüner (LW) to (Germany) Dessau-Roßlauer HV
- (Germany) Felix Eisele (RW) to (Germany) TuS N-Lübbecke

=== Transfer History ===
Transfers for the 2025–26 season

Joining

- (Israel) Yonatan Dayan (CB) from (Germany) ASV Hamm-Westfalen
- (Germany) Mex Raguse (LB) from (Germany) TSG Friesenheim
- (Germany) Georg Pöhle (LB) from (Germany) HSG Nordhorn-Lingen
- (Germany) Stefan Bauer (LP) from (Germany) HSG Nordhorn-Lingen
- (Germany) Merlin Fuss (RB) from (Germany) HSC 2000 Coburg
- (Germany) Magnus Grupe (CB) from (Germany) Rhein-Neckar Löwen
- (Germany) Daniel Rebmann (GK) from (Germany) TVB Stuttgart

Leaving

- (Iceland) Daníel Þór Ingason (LB) to (Iceland) ÍBV
- (Sweden) Max Santos (LP) to (Germany) TuS N-Lübbecke
- (Sweden) Daniel Blomgren (LB) to (Norway) Runar Sandefjord
- (Germany) Jerome Müller (RB) to (Switzerland) HC Kriens-Luzern
- (Germany) Robert Timmermeister (LB) loan back to (Germany) Rhein-Neckar Löwen
- (Germany) Danil Dyatlov (RB) to (Germany) TV Hüttenberg
- (Germany) Jannis Schneibel (CB) loan back to (Germany) ThSV Eisenach
- (Poland) Mateusz Kornecki (GK) to (Germany) TVB Stuttgart

Transfers for the 2024–25 season

Joining

- (Poland) Mateusz Kornecki (GK) from (Germany) ThSV Eisenach
- (Hungary) Benedek Nagy (GK) on loan from (Hungary) Telekom Veszprém
- (Germany) Robert Timmermeister (LB) (loan from (Germany) Rhein-Neckar Löwen)
- (Germany) Jannis Schneibel (CB) on loan from (Germany) ThSV Eisenach
- (Germany) Tim Matthes (LW) (from (Germany) SC DHfK Leipzig)
- (Germany) Sascha Pfattheicher (RW) (from (Germany) TVB Stuttgart)

Leaving

- (Germany) Mario Ruminsky (GK) (retires)
- (Egypt) Mohamed El-Tayar (GK) (to (Germany) HSV Hamburg)
- (Germany) Patrick Volz (LW) (to (Germany) SG Flensburg-Handewitt)
- (Germany) Jona Schoch (LB) (to (Germany) HSG Wetzlar)
- (Croatia) Filip Vistorop (LB) (to (Germany) ThSV Eisenach)
- (Germany) Lukas Saueressig (CB) (to (Switzerland) HSC Kreuzlingen)
- (Iceland) Oddur Grétarsson (LW) (to (Iceland) Þór Akureyri)
- (Germany) Mischa Locher (LW) (to ?)
- (Germany) Tom Hildebrand (RW) (to ?)
- (Croatia) Nikola Grahovac (P) (to (Hungary) Telekom Vészprem)
- (Germany) Felix Danner (P) (retires)

== Previous squads ==
2013–2014 Team
Shirt No	Nationality	Player	Birth Date	Position
2	Germany	Fabian Böhm	24 June 1989 (age 37)	Left Back
3	Germany	Felix König	26 October 1990 (age 35)	Central Back
4	Germany	Christoph Foth	1 January 1991 (age 35)	Line Player
8	Serbia	Dragan Tubić	24 August 1985 (age 40)	Right Winger
9	Germany	Frank Ettwein	26 July 1977 (age 49)	Left Winger
10	Austria	Roland Schlinger	17 September 1982 (age 43)	Left Back
11	Germany	Wolfgang Strobel	15 December 1983 (age 42)	Line Player
12	Germany	Karim Ketelaer	25 July 1993 (age 33)	Goalkeeper
13	Germany	Christoph Theuerkauf	13 October 1984 (age 41)	Line Player
14	Germany	Daniel Wessig	31 January 1988 (age 38)	Left Back
15	Germany	Martin Strobel	5 June 1986 (age 40)	Central Back
16	Germany	Matthias Puhle	11 October 1985 (age 40)	Goalkeeper
17	Germany	Kai Häfner	10 July 1989 (age 37)	Right Back
18	Germany	Michael Kintrup	11 March 1989 (age 37)	Right Back
19	Germany	Patrick Weber	11 June 1992 (age 34)	Left Winger
20	Germany	Sascha Ilitsch	8 August 1985 (age 41)	Left Back
21	Germany	Florian Billek	16 July 1988 (age 38)	Right Winger
24	Switzerland	Manuel Liniger	10 September 1981 (age 44)	Left Winger
29	Germany	Nikolas Katsigiannis	17 September 1982 (age 43)	Goalkeeper

2012–2013 Team
Shirt No	Nationality	Player	Birth Date	Position
1	Slovakia	Miloš Putera	26 January 1982 (age 44)	Goalkeeper
3	Germany	Felix König	26 October 1990 (age 35)	Central Back
4	Germany	Christoph Foth	1 January 1991 (age 35)	Line Player
5	Germany	Benjamin Herth	3 August 1985 (age 41)	Central Back
6	Serbia	Krsto Milošević	6 January 1988 (age 38)	Left Back
7	Croatia	Mario Vuglač	30 January 1992 (age 34)	Right Back
8	Serbia	Dragan Tubić	24 August 1985 (age 40)	Right Winger
9	Germany	Frank Ettwein	26 July 1977 (age 49)	Left Winger
10	Austria	Roland Schlinger	17 September 1982 (age 43)	Left Back
11	Germany	Wolfgang Strobel	15 December 1983 (age 42)	Line Player
12	Germany	Paul Bar	13 September 1990 (age 35)	Goalkeeper
13	Germany	Christoph Theuerkauf	13 October 1984 (age 41)	Line Player
15	Germany	Daniel Wessig	31 January 1988 (age 38)	Left Back
16	Germany	Matthias Puhle	11 October 1985 (age 40)	Goalkeeper
17	Germany	Kai Häfner	10 July 1989 (age 37)	Right Back
20	Germany	Sascha Ilitsch	8 August 1985 (age 41)	Left Back
21	Germany	Florian Billek	16 July 1988 (age 38)	Right Winger
22	Germany	Fabian Gutbrod	1 July 1988 (age 38)	Left Back
24	Switzerland	Manuel Liniger	10 September 1981 (age 44)	Left Winger

2010–2011 Team
Shirt No	Nationality	Player	Birth Date	Position
1	AustriaSerbia	Nikola Marinovic	29 August 1976 (age 49)	Goalkeeper
3	Germany	Felix König	26 October 1990 (age 35)	Central Back
4	Germany	Felix Lobedank	12 August 1984 (age 42)	Right Back
5	Germany	Benjamin Herth	3 August 1985 (age 41)	Central Back
6	Germany	Daniel Sauer	18 October 1981 (age 44)	Left Back
8	Germany	Dennis Wilke	14 September 1985 (age 40)	Right Winger
9	Germany	Frank Ettwein	26 July 1977 (age 49)	Left Winger
10	Austria	Roland Schlinger	17 September 1982 (age 43)	Left Back
11	Germany	Wolfgang Strobel	15 December 1983 (age 42)	Line Player
12	France	Ivan Zoubkoff	24 August 1977 (age 48)	Goalkeeper
14	North Macedonia	Vlatko Mitkov	16 August 1981 (age 45)	Right Back
15	AustriaSlovenia	Mare Hojc	5 January 1982 (age 44)	Central Back
17	North Macedonia	Vladimir Temelkov	26 March 1980 (age 46)	Right Winger
18	Germany	Jens Bürkle	14 January 1980 (age 46)	Line Player
19	France	Johan Boisedu	14 December 1979 (age 46)	Left Back
20	Germany	Sascha Ilitsch	8 August 1985 (age 41)	Left Back
21	Germany	Sandro Catak	30 May 1984 (age 42)	Central Back

== EHF ranking ==
As of 9 December 2021

Rank	Team	Points
218	(France) Limoges Handball	13
219	(Austria) SC Ferlach	13
220	(France) Cesson Rennes MHB	13
221	(Germany) HBW Balingen-Weilstetten	13
222	(Norway) Kolstad Håndball	12
223	(Estonia) Viljandi HC	12
224	(Kosovo) KH Kastrioti	12

== Former club members ==
=== Notable former players ===
- (Germany) Florian Billek (2012–2014)
- (Germany) Fabian Böhm (2013–2016)
- (Germany) Matthias Flohr (2016–2019)
- (Germany) Fabian Gutbrod (2011–2013)
- (Germany) Kai Häfner (2011–2014)
- (Germany) Pascal Hens (2016–2017)
- (Germany) Benjamin Herth (2003–2013)
- (Germany) Nikolas Katsigiannis (2012–2014)
- (Germany) Stefan Kneer (2006–2008)
- (Germany) Yves Kunkel (2015–2017)
- (Germany) Jörg Kunze (2005–2007)
- (Germany) Jürgen Müller (2003–2007)
- (Germany) Philipp Müller (2008–2010)
- (Germany) Christian Ramota (2008)
- (Germany) Martin Strobel (2005–2008, 2013–2020)
- (Germany) Christoph Theuerkauf (2012–2016)
- (Germany) Martin Ziemer (2011–2012)
- (Austria) (Slovenia) Mare Hojc (2009–2011)
- (Austria) Klemens Kainmüller (2006–2007)
- (Austria) (Lithuania) Romas Kirveliavičius (2018–2021)
- (Austria) (Serbia) Nikola Marinovic (2009–2011)
- (Austria) Roland Schlinger (2010–2014)
- (Austria) Nikola Stevanovic (2021–2022)
- (Austria) David Szlezak (2004–2005)
- (Austria) Markus Wagesreiter (2008–2010)
- (Austria) Tobias Wagner (2016–2018)
- (Austria) Robert Weber (2008–2009)
- (Bosnia and Herzegovina) Faruk Vražalić (2014–2015)
- (Belarus) Viachaslau Saldatsenka (2017)
- (Croatia) Matej Ašanin (2014–2016)
- (Croatia) Kristian Bećiri (2021–)
- (Croatia) Vladimir Božić (2014–2016)
- (Croatia) Davor Dominiković (2015–2017)
- (Croatia) Mario Vuglač (2011–2012)
- (Czech Republic) Martin Kovář (2007)
- (Czech Republic) Tomáš Mrkva (2016–2019)
- (Czech Republic) Miloš Slabý (2004–2009)
- (Denmark) Mike Jensen (2019–2021)
- (Denmark) Simon Sejr (2021–)
- (Denmark) Morten Slundt (2012)
- (France) Johan Boisedu (2010–2011)
- (France) (Democratic Republic of the Congo) Rock Feliho (2007–2010)
- (France) Olivier Nyokas (2014–2016)
- (France) Yann Polydore (2014–2015)
- (France) Ivan Zoubkoff (2003–2004, 2009–2011)
- (Greece) Alexandros Alvanos (2011–2012)
- (Greece) Spyros Balomenos (2008–2009)
- (Greece) Alexandros Vasilakis (2014–2016)
- (Hungary) Nándor Fazekas (2015)
- (Iceland) Oddur Grétarsson (2017–)
- (Iceland) Daníel Þór Ingason (2021–)
- (Iceland) Sigtryggur Daði Rúnarsson (2017–2018)
- (South Korea) Cho Chi-hyo (2007–2009)
- (North Macedonia) Vlatko Mitkov (2010–2011)
- (North Macedonia) Filip Taleski (2019–2020)
- (North Macedonia) Vladimir Temelkov (2009–2011)
- (Montenegro) Vladan Lipovina (2019–2022)
- (Montenegro) (Serbia) Radivoje Ristanović (2014–2016)
- (Netherlands) Gerrie Eijlers (2008–2009)
- (Russia) Gleb Kalarash (2021)
- (Serbia) Milan Kosanović (2006–2008)
- (Serbia) Krsto Milošević (2012–2013)
- (Serbia) Aleksandar Stanojević (2006–2007)
- (Serbia) Dragan Tubić (2012–2015)
- (Switzerland) Manuel Liniger (2012–2014)
- (Slovakia) Miloš Putera (2012–2013)
- (Sweden) Peter Johannesson (2015–2017)
- (Sweden) Markus Stegefelt (2016–2018)
- (Tunisia) Marouen Maggaiz (2017–2018)

=== Former coaches ===
Seasons	Coach	Country
2004–2013	Rolf Brack	(Germany)
2013–2015	Markus Gaugisch	(Germany)
2016	Frank Bergemann	(Germany)
2016–2017	Rúnar Sigtryggsson	(Iceland)
2017–	Jens Bürkle	(Germany)
