= TuS Nettelstedt-Lübbecke =

German handball club

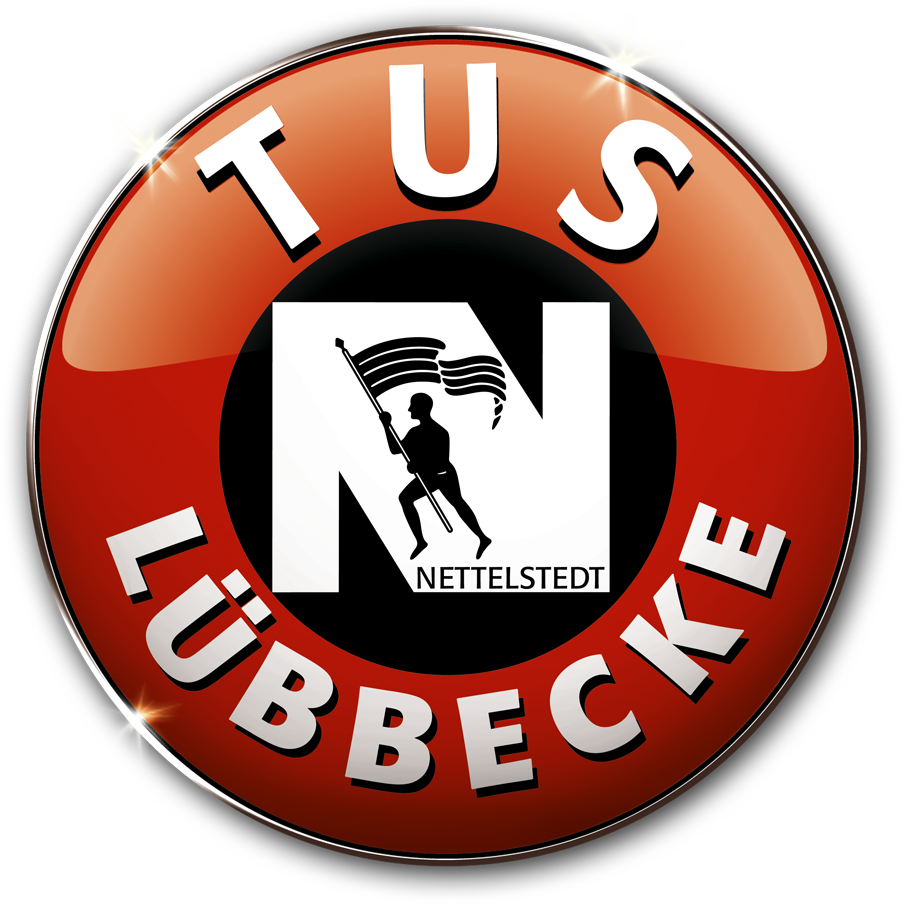
- Full name: TuS Nettelstedt-Lübbecke e.V.
- Founded: 1912
- Arena: Merkur Arena
- Capacity: 3,300
- President: Torsten Appel
- Head coach: Michael Haaß
- League: 2. Handball-Bundesliga
- 2024–25: 15th
- Club colours
| Home | Away |

TuS Nettelstedt-Lübbecke is a handball club from Lübbecke, Germany, that plays in the 2nd Handball-Bundesliga since 2022-23.

Their greatest accomplishment was in 1981 when they won both the DHB-Pokal and the EHF Cup Winners' Cup the same year.

== Accomplishments ==
- 2. Handball-Bundesliga: 5
  - Gold: 1994, 2002, 2004, 2009, 2017
- DHB-Pokal:
  - Gold: 1981
- EHF Cup Winners' Cup:
  - Gold: 1981
- EHF Challenge Cup:
  - Gold: 1997, 1998
- European Club Championship:
  - Silver: 1981

== Team ==
=== Current squad ===
Squad for the 2021–22 season

Goalkeepers

- 1 (Norway) Håvard Åsheim
- 16 (Slovenia) Aljoša Rezar

Left Wingers

- 45 (Germany) Jan-Eric Speckmann
- 52 (Germany) Tom Skroblien

Right Wingers

- 14 (Germany) Peter Strosack
- 15 (Germany) Marvin Mundus

Line players

- 19 (Germany) Yannick Dräger
- 20 (Croatia) Tin Kontrec
- 48 (Czech Republic) Leoš Petrovský

Left Backs

- 5 (Germany) Lutz Heiny
- 23 (Germany) Valentin Spohn
- 28 (Germany) Marek Nissen

Central Backs

- 10 (Germany) Tom Wolf
- 11 (Lithuania) Benas Petreikis
- 22 (Croatia) Luka Mrakovčić

Right Backs

- 3 (Japan) Rennosuke Tokuda
- 7 (Germany) Florian Baumgärtner
- 9 (Germany) Dominik Ebner

=== Transfers ===
Transfers for the 2026–27 season

Joining

- (Germany) Thies Bergemann (RW) from (Austria) UHK Krems
- (Germany) Felix Eisele (RW) from (Germany) HBW Balingen-Weilstetten
- (Germany) Finn Wullenweber (LB) from (Germany) TV Großwallstadt
- (Germany) Niklas Gautzsch (LB) from (Germany) ASV Hamm-Westfalen
- (Germany) Malte Dederding (RB) from (Germany) HC Oppenweiler/Backnang

Leaving

- (Hungary) Bence Hornyák (RW) to (Romania) CSM Vaslui
- (Germany) Tim Roman Wieling (RW) (retires)
- (Germany) Sven Wesseling (LB) to (Germany) HSC 2000 Coburg
- (Germany) Jó Gerrit Genz (RB) to (Germany) LiT 1912
- (Germany) Lutz Heiny (LB)

=== Transfer History ===
Transfers for the 2025–26 season

Joining

- (Netherlands) Niko Blaauw (LB) from (Germany) VfL Lübeck-Schwartau
- (Norway) Kasper Haugen Furu (CB) from (Norway) Runar Sandefjord
- (Sweden) Jacob Lundahl (LP) from (Sweden) Alingsås HK
- (Sweden) Max Santos (LP) from (Germany) HBW Balingen-Weilstetten
- (Hungary) Bence Hornyák (RW) from (Hungary) Veszprémi KKFT
- (Germany) Henri Pabst (RB) from (Germany) THW Kiel
- (Germany) Fredrik Genz (GK) from (Germany) SG BBM Bietigheim

Leaving

- (Croatia) Tin Kontrec (LP) to (Germany) HSC 2000 Coburg
- (Lithuania) Benas Petreikis (CB) to (Germany) LiT 1912
- (Germany) Valentin Abt (CB) to (Germany) HC Oppenweiler/Backnang
- (Germany) Falk Kolodziej (CB) to (Germany) HSG Krefeld
- (Germany) Dominik Ebner (GK) to (Germany) TSG A-H Bielefeld
- (Germany) Lukas Süsser (LP) to (Germany) TuS Ferndorf
- (Germany) Tim Kloor (RW) to (Germany) TuS Spenge

== Notable former players ==
- (Germany) Herbert Lübking
- (Germany) Dieter Waltke
- (Germany) Rainer Niemeyer
- (Poland) Zbigniew Tluczynski
- (Poland) Bogdan Wenta
- (Croatia) Zoran Mikulić
- (Russia) Talant Dujshebaev
- (Germany) Sven Lakenmacher
- (Russia) Andrey Lavrov
- (Norway) Frank Løke
- (Bosnia and Herzegovina) Abas Arslanagić
- (Croatia) Zoran Zivkovic
- (Croatia) Velimir Kljaić
- (Croatia) Milan Lazarević
- (Croatia) Zdravko Miljak
- (Croatia) Slavko Goluža
- (Croatia) Risto Arnaudovski
- (Poland) Michał Jurecki
- (Poland) Artur Siódmiak
- (Croatia) Michele Skatar
- (Croatia) Nikola Blažičko
- (Serbia) Branko Kokir
- (Iceland) Þórir Ólafsson
- (Poland) Tomasz Tłuczyński
- (Russia) Oleg Gagin
- (Croatia) Drago Vuković
