= ThSV Eisenach =

German handball club

- Full name: Thüringer Sportverein Eisenach e. V.
- Founded: 1949; 77 years ago as BSG Motor Eisenach; 1990; 36 years ago as ThSV Eisenach
- Arena: Werner-Aßmann-Halle
- Capacity: 3,100
- President: Shpetim Alaj
- Head coach: Misha Kaufmann
- League: Handball-Bundesliga
- 2025–26: 14th of 18
- Club colours
Home	Away

Thüringer Sportverein Eisenach e. V., better known as ThSV Eisenach, is a German handball club from Eisenach, Germany, that plays in the Handball-Bundesliga. They were promoted in the 2022-23 season. The team has previously been known as BSG Motor Eisenach.

== History ==
=== BSG Motor Eisenach - 1954-1991 ===
BSG Motor Eisenach, the precursor to ThSV Eisenach, played in the East German league system. From 1954 until 1991 they played 31 seasons in the DDR-Oberliga Handball, the top league and 5 in the DDR-Liga, the second highest league. In 1958 the club won the East German championship in field handball.

=== ThSV Eisenach ===
The modern club ThSV Eisenach was founded on June 11, 1990. After the German unification the club has bounced between the 2nd and 1st Bundesliga.

== Crest, colours, supporters ==
=== Kits ===
HOME
Pro Touch; 2012–14	2015-17	2017-18	2019–20

AWAY
2015-16	2017-18

== Current squad ==
Squad for the 2024–25 season

Goalkeepers

- 1 (Croatia) Matija Špikić
- (Germany) Silvio Heinevetter

Left wingers

- 5 (Switzerland) Timothy Reichmuth
- 82 (Croatia) Ivan Snajder

Right wingers

- 21 (Germany) Moritz Ende
- (Switzerland) Gian Attenhofer

Line players

- 14 (Germany) Peter Walz (c)
- 27 (Germany) Philipp Meyer
- 52 (Germany) Justin Kurch
- (Croatia) Rok Marić

Left backs

- 15 (Italy) Simone Mengon
- 17 (Germany) Marko Grgić
- 47 (Germany) Dustin Kraus
- (Croatia) Aleksandar Čaprić
- (Croatia) Filip Vistorop

Centre backs

- (Germany) Fynn Hangstein

Right backs

- 39 (Germany) Malte Donker
- 95 (Germany) Alexander Saul

=== Transfers ===
Transfers for the 2026–27 season

Joining

- (Sweden) Felix Montebovi (LW) from (Sweden) HK Malmö
- (Germany) David Móré (LW) from (Germany) Rhein-Neckar Löwen
- (Germany) Elias Scholtes (RB) from (Germany) Bergischer HC
- (Germany) Mats Grupe (GK) from (Germany) Eulen Ludwigshafen

Leaving

- (Switzerland) Timothy Reichmuth (LW) to (Switzerland) HSC Suhr Aarau
- (Croatia) Aleksandar Čaprić (LB) to (Germany) ASV Hamm-Westfalen
- (Germany) Vincent Büchner (LW) to (Germany) THW Kiel
- (Germany) Philipp Meyer (LB) to (Germany) TVB Stuttgart
- (Germany) Alexander Saul (RB) to (Germany) SV Anhalt Bernburg
- (Germany) Max Beneke (RB) loan back to (Germany) Füchse Berlin

=== Transfer History ===
Transfers for the 2025–26 season

Joining

- (Switzerland) Felix Aellen (CB) from (Switzerland) BSV Bern
- (Sweden) Oskar Joelsson (LB) from (Sweden) Ystads IF
- (Serbia) Vukašin Antonijević (CB) from (Slovenia) RK Celje
- (Germany) Stephan Seitz (RB) from (Germany) SC DHfK Leipzig
- (Germany) Vincent Büchner (LW) from (Germany) TSV Hannover-Burgdorf
- (Germany) Tillman Leu (LP) from (Germany) Dessau-Rosslauer HV
- (Germany) Max Beneke (RB) on loan from (Germany) Füchse Berlin
- (Germany) Jannis Schneibel (CB) back from loan at (Germany) HBW Balingen-Weilstetten

Leaving

- (Croatia) Filip Vistorop (CB) to (Germany) HSG Wetzlar
- (Croatia) Ivan Šnajder (LW) to (Germany) TVB Stuttgart
- (Italy) Simone Mengon (CB) to (Germany) TVB Stuttgart
- (Croatia) Rok Marić (LP) to (France) Pau Billère Handball
- (Germany) Marko Grgic (LB) to (Germany) SG Flensburg-Handewitt
- (Germany) Malte Donker (RB) to (Germany) GWD Minden
- (Germany) Justin Kurch (LP) return from loan (Germany) HC Erlangen
- (Germany) Fynn Hangstein (CB) to (Germany) Bergischer HC

Transfers for the 2024–25 season

Joining

- (Germany) Silvio Heinevetter (GK) from (Germany) TVB Stuttgart
- (Croatia) Aleksandar Čaprić (LB) from (Croatia) MRK Sesvete
- (Croatia) Filip Vistorop (LB) from (Germany) HBW Balingen-Weilstetten
- (Germany) Fynn Hangstein (CB) from (Germany) TuS Nettelstedt-Lübbecke
- (Switzerland) Gian Attenhofer (RW) from (Switzerland) HSC Suhr Aarau
- (Croatia) Rok Marić (LP) from (Slovenia) RK Celje

Leaving

- (Poland) Mateusz Kornecki (GK) to (Germany) HBW Balingen-Weilstetten
- (Germany) Bastian Freitag (GK) loan to (Germany) Stralsunder HV
- (Germany) Dominik Plaue (GK) to (Germany) TUSEM Essen
- (Switzerland) Manuel Zehnder (LB) return from loan (Germany) HC Erlangen
- (Germany) Niclas Heitkamp (CB) to (Germany) GWD Minden
- (Germany) Jannis Schneibel (CB) loan to (Germany) HBW Balingen-Weilstetten
- (Israel) Yoav Lumbroso (CB) to (Romania) Dinamo București
- (Germany) Willy Weyhrauch (RW) (retires)
