= Jakub Szymański =

Jakub Szymański or Jakub Szymanski may refer to:

- Jakub Szymański (athlete) (born 2002), Polish hurdler
- Jakub Szymański (footballer, born 2000), Polish association football goalkeeper
- Jakub Szymański (footballer, born 2002), Polish association football defender
- Jakub Szymanski (handballer) (born 1983), Czech handballer
- Jakub Szymański (volleyball) (born 1998), Polish volleyball player
