= Filip Jícha =

Czech handball player

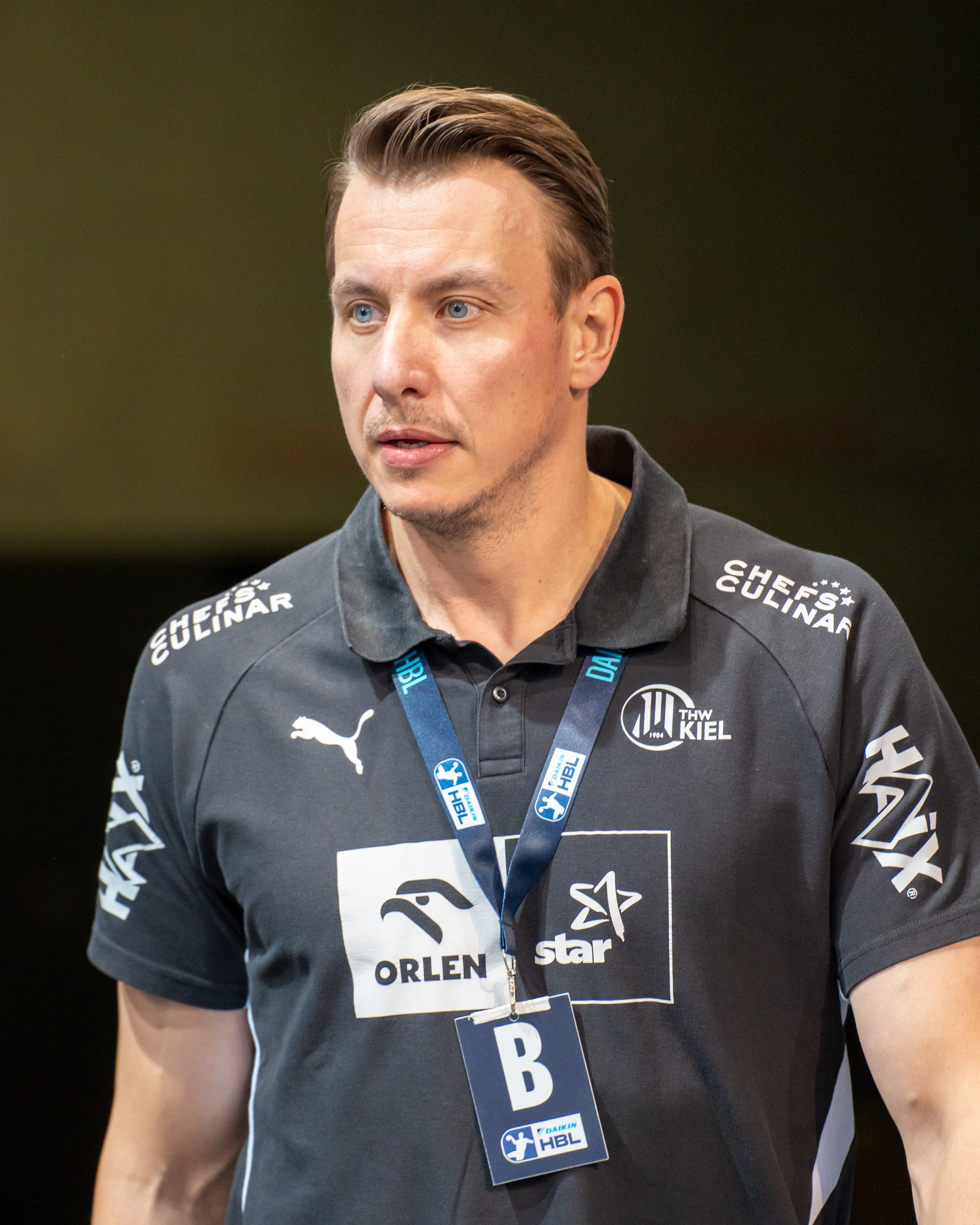
- Jicha with THW Kiel in 2026

Personal information
- Nationality: Czech
- Born: 19 April 1982 (age 44) Starý Plzenec, Czechoslovakia
- Height: 2.01 m (6 ft 7 in)

Sport
- Sport: Handball
- Position: Left back
- Current club: THW Kiel (manager)

Youth career
- Years: Team
- 1988–1995: Starý Plzenec

Senior clubs
- Years: Team
- 1995–2000: Slavia Plzeň
- 2000–2003: HC Dukla Prague
- 2002: → Lokomotiva Louny
- 2003: Al Ahli Jeddah
- 2003: Al Ahli Sport Club
- 2003–2004: TSV St. Otmar St. Gallen
- 2004: Al Ahli Sport Club
- 2004–2005: TSV St. Otmar St. Gallen
- 2005–2007: TBV Lemgo
- 2007–2015: THW Kiel
- 2015–2017: FC Barcelona
National team
Years	Team	Apps	(Gls)
2000–2016	Czech Republic	148	(816)

Teams managed
- 2018–2019: THW Kiel (assistant)
- 2019–: THW Kiel

Filip Jícha (born 19 April 1982) is a Czech former handballer. He most recently played for Spanish handball team FC Barcelona. He also played for the Czech national team. Currently he is the head coach of his former club, German handball team THW Kiel. His biggest success as a coach has been winning the EHF Champions League with THW Kiel in the 2019–20 season.

He was included in the European Handball Federation Hall of Fame in 2023.

== Playing career ==
Jícha started his career in HC Dukla Prague and moved through Saudi Arabian and Qatari clubs to TSV St. Otmar St. Gallen in Switzerland. He had a broken thump in 2005 which ept him out for a long time.

For the 2005–26 season he joined German TBV Lemgo. For the 2007–08 season he joined THW Kiel for a €400.000 transfer fee. In 2010 he became the first Czech player to win the EHF Champions League. On 16 July 2012 he extended his contract until 2016.

In August 2015 he joined FC Barcelona Handbol. Here he won the Spanish Championship in 2016 and 2017. He retired in 2017.

== Coaching career ==
For the 2018/19 season he became the assistant coach at hs former club THW Kiel. In 2019 he took over as the head coach following the departure of Alfreð Gíslason. In his first season he won the German Championship and was named coach of the year in the Bundesliga. Same season he won the EHF Champions League in the 2019–2020 season.

== Titles ==
=== Player ===
- FC Barcelona
  - Spanish Champion 2016 and 2017
  - Spanish Cup 2016 and 2017
- THW Kiel
  - EHF Champions League 2010 and 2012
  - Champions-League Finalist 2008, 2009 and 2014
  - German Champion 2008, 2009, 2010, 2012, 2013, 2014 and 2015
  - German Cup 2008, 2009, 2011, 2012 and 2013
  - Super-Globe 2011
  - EHF Champions Trophy 2007
  - German Supercup 2007, 2008, 2011, 2012 and 2014
- TBV Lemgo
  - EHF Cup 2006
- Al Ahli (QAT)
  - Qatar-Emir's-Cup 2002
- Dukla Prague (CZE)
  - Czech Republic Championship second place 2003

=== Assistent coach ===
- THW Kiel
  - EHF Cup 2019
  - German Cup 2019

=== Head coach ===
- THW Kiel
  - German Champion 2020, 2021, 2023
  - German Cup 2022, 2025
  - EHF Champions League 2020
  - German Supercup 2020, 2021, 2022, 2023

== Awards ==
- IHF World Handball Player of the Year: 2010
- EHF Hall of Fame in 2023.
- German Coach of the year: 2020

Awards
Preceded by (Poland) Sławomir Szmal	IHF World Player of the Year – Men; 2010	Succeeded by (Denmark) Mikkel Hansen
Preceded by (France) Nikola Karabatić	Most Valuable Player of Handball European Championship; 2010	Succeeded by (Serbia) Momir Ilić
