= Marek Vančo =

Czech handball player

Personal information
- Nationality: Czech
- Born: 12 July 1989 (age 37) Karviná, Czechoslovakia
- Height: 1.87 m (6 ft 2 in)

Sport
- Sport: Handball
- Position: Left wing
- Current club: HC Elbflorenz
- Number: 26

Senior clubs
- Years: Team
- -2014: HCB Karviná
- 2014-2019: Dessau-Roßlauer HV
- 2019-2013: HC Elbflorenz
National team
| Years | Team | Apps | (Gls) |
| 2010-2023 | Czech Republic | 54 | (52) |
- Updated on 27 December 2023

Marek Vančo (born 12 July 1989) is a Czech former handball player for HC Elbflorenz and Dessau-Roßlauer HV in Germany and HCB Karviná in Czechia. He also played for the Czech national team.
