= 2018 European Men's Handball Championship =

2018 edition of the European Men's Handball Championship

2018 EHF European Men's Handball Championship
Europsko rukometno prvenstvo za muškarce 2018

Tournament details
- Host country: Croatia
- Venues: 4 (in 4 host cities)
- Dates: 12–28 January
- Teams: 16 (from 1 confederation)

Final positions
- Champions: Spain (1st title)
- Runners-up: Sweden
- Third place: France
- Fourth place: Denmark

Tournament statistics
- Matches played: 47
- Goals scored: 2,563 (54.53 per match)
- Attendance: 263,209 (5,600 per match)
- Top scorers: (Czech Republic) Ondřej Zdráhala (56 goals)

Awards
- Best player: (Sweden) Jim Gottfridsson

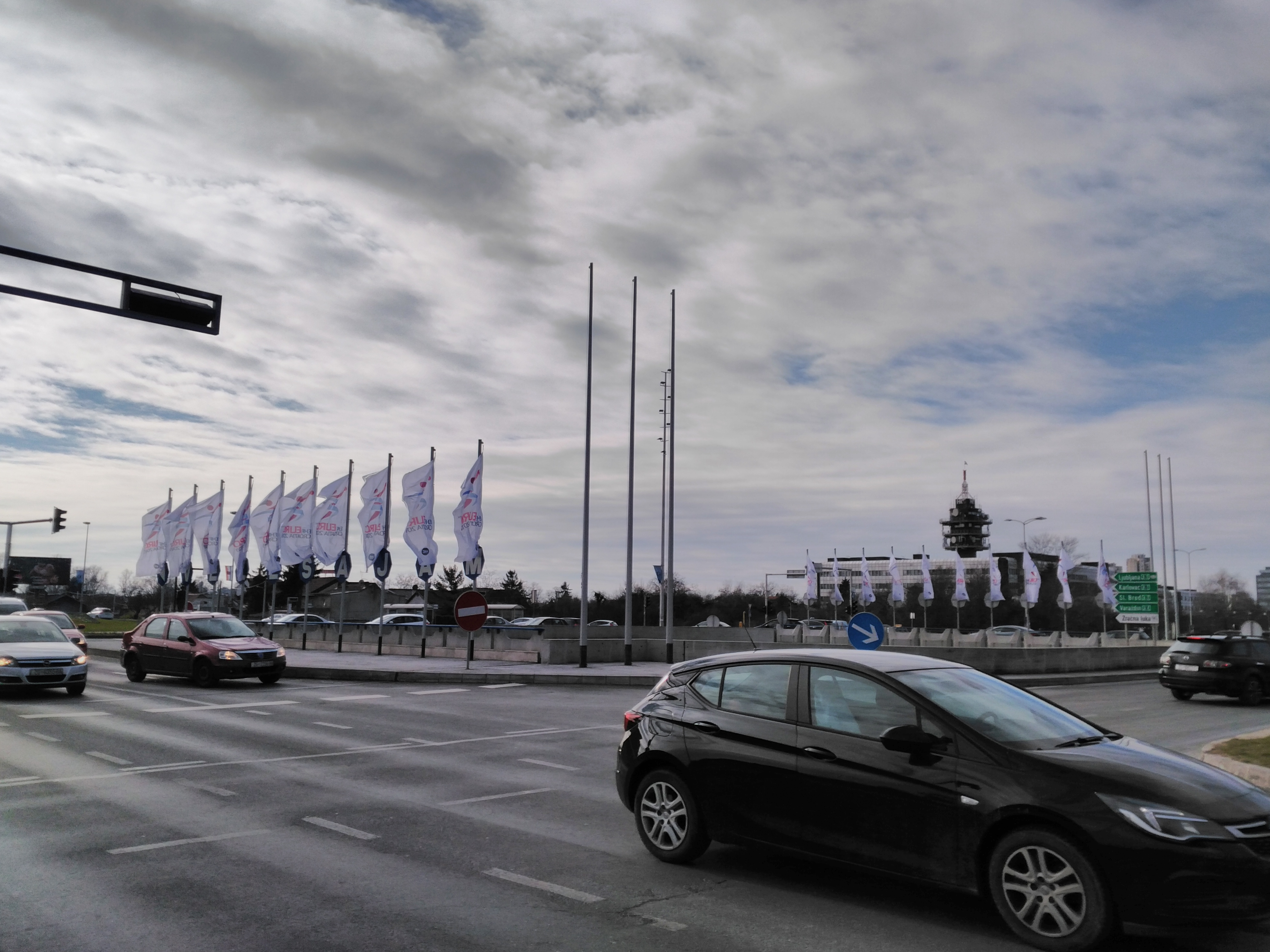
EHF flags in Zagreb

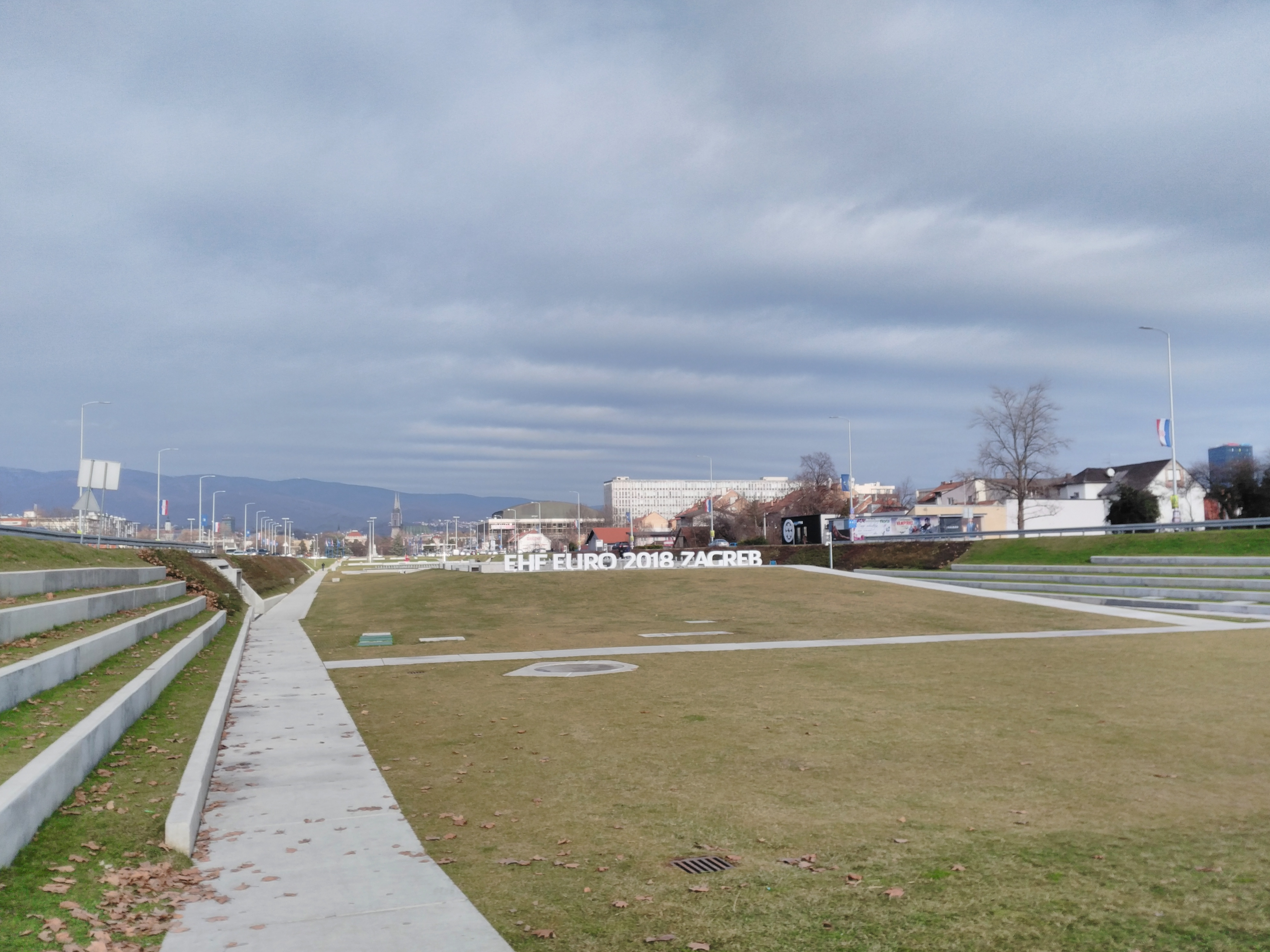
Championship Billboard in Zagreb

The 2018 EHF European Men's Handball Championship was the 14th edition of the tournament, hosted for the second time in Croatia from 12 to 28 January 2018. Croatia was awarded hosting the tournament during the EHF congress in Dublin on 20 September 2014. This was the last edition to feature 16 teams, with the 2020 edition expanding to 24 teams and six preliminary groups format.

Spain won their first title after defeating Sweden 29–23 in the final. France captured the bronze medal after defeating Denmark 32–29. Defending champions Germany finished 9th while the hosts Croatia broke the streak of playing 7 semifinals in a row by finishing 5th.

== Bidding process ==
The interested nations were as follows:

- Croatia
- Norway
- Sweden

In December 2013, these were announced as the bids:

- Croatia
- Norway
- Norway and Sweden
- Sweden

Croatia was recommended as the preferred bid. Croatia was confirmed as the host on 20 September 2014.

== Venues ==
Each venue hosted one group, while Zagreb and Varaždin (which replaced Split as a main round venue) hosted the main round. The final weekend was in Zagreb.

Zagreb	Split	2018 European Men's Handball Championship is located in Croatia
Arena Zagreb; Capacity: 15,200	Spaladium Arena; Capacity: 10,941	2018 European Men's Handball Championship is located in Croatia
Varaždin	Poreč	2018 European Men's Handball Championship is located in Croatia
Varaždin Arena; Capacity: 5,200	Žatika Sport Centre; Capacity: 3,700	2018 European Men's Handball Championship is located in Croatia

== Qualification ==
=== Qualified teams ===
Country	Qualified as	Qualified on	Previous appearances in tournament
Croatia	Host	20 September 2014	12 (1994, 1996, 1998, 2000, 2002, 2004, 2006, 2008, 2010, 2012, 2014, 2016)
Spain	Group 3 winner	6 May 2017	12 (1994, 1996, 1998, 2000, 2002, 2004, 2006, 2008, 2010, 2012, 2014, 2016)
Germany	Group 5 winner	6 May 2017	11 (1994, 1996, 1998, 2000, 2002, **2004**, 2006, 2008, 2010, 2012, **2016**)
Sweden	Group 6 winner	6 May 2017	11 (**1994**, 1996, **1998**, **2000**, **2002**, 2004, 2008, 2010, 2012, 2014, 2016)
Denmark	Group 1 winner	14 June 2017	11 (1994, 1996, 2000, 2002, 2004, 2006, **2008**, 2010, **2012**, 2014, 2016)
France	Group 7 winner	14 June 2017	12 (1994, 1996, 1998, 2000, 2002, 2004, **2006**, 2008, **2010**, 2012, **2014**, 2016)
Hungary	Group 1 runner-up	15 June 2017	10 (1994, 1996, 1998, 2004, 2006, 2008, 2010, 2012, 2014, 2016)
Serbia	Group 2 runner-up	15 June 2017	4 ( 2010, 2012, 2014, 2016)
Belarus	Group 2 winner	15 June 2017	4 (1994, 2008, 2014, 2016)
Montenegro	Group 6 runner-up	17 June 2017	3 (2008, 2014, 2016)
Norway	Group 7 runner-up	17 June 2017	7 (2000, 2006, 2008, 2010, 2012, 2014, 2016)
Slovenia	Group 5 runner-up	17 June 2017	10 (1994, 1996, 2000, 2002, 2004, 2006, 2008, 2010, 2012, 2016)
Austria	Group 3 runner-up	17 June 2017	2 (2010, 2014)
Czech Republic	Group 4 runner-up	18 June 2017	8 (1996, 1998, 2002, 2004, 2008, 2010, 2012, 2014)
Macedonia	Group 4 winner	18 June 2017	4 (1998, 2012, 2014, 2016)
Iceland	Group 4 third place	18 June 2017	9 (2000, 2002, 2004, 2006, 2008, 2010, 2012, 2014, 2016)

Note: Bold indicates champion for that year. Italic indicates host for that year.

== Draw ==
The draw was held on 23 June 2017.

=== Seeding ===
The seedings were announced on 19 June 2017.

Pot 1	Pot 2	Pot 3	Pot 4
Germany; Spain; Croatia (assigned to A1); France	Denmark; Belarus; Sweden; Macedonia	Norway (assigned to B3); Serbia; Montenegro; Czech Republic	Hungary (assigned to D4); Slovenia (assigned to C4); Austria; Iceland

== Match officials ==
On 26 October 2017, 12 couples were announced.

Country	Referees
Belarus	Andrei Gousko; Siarhei Repkin
Croatia	Matija Gubica; Boris Milošević
Czech Republic	Václav Horáček; Jiří Novotný
Denmark	Martin Gjeding; Mads Hansen
France	Stevann Pichon; Laurent Reveret
Germany	Lars Geipel; Marcus Helbig

Country	Referees
Lithuania	Vaidas Mažeika; Mindaugas Gatelis
Macedonia	Gjorgi Nachevski; Slave Nikolov
Portugal	Duarte Santos; Ricardo Fonseca
Romania	Sorin-Laurențiu Dinu; Constantin Din
Spain	Óscar Raluy; Ángel Sabroso
Russia	Evgeny Zotin; Nikolay Volodkov

== Preliminary round ==
All times are local (UTC+1).

=== Group A ===
Pos	Team	Pld	W	D	L	GF	GA	GD	Pts	Qualification
1	Sweden	3	2	0	1	89	82	+7	4 (Note: Croatia 31–35 Sweden)	Main round
2	Croatia (H)	3	2	0	1	92	79	+13	4	Main round
3	Serbia	3	1	0	2	76	88	−12	2 (Note: Serbia 29–26 Iceland)	Main round
4	Iceland	3	1	0	2	74	82	−8	2	

Source: EHF
Rules for classification: 1) points; 2) head-to-head points; 3) head-to-head goal difference; 4) head-to-head number of goals scored; 5) goal difference.
(H) Hosts
Notes:

12 January 2018; 18:15	Sweden	24–26	Iceland	Spaladium Arena, Split; Attendance: 8,700; Referees: Nikolov, Nachevski (MKD)
12 January 2018; 18:15	Gottfridsson 6	(8–15)	Guðmundsson 7	Spaladium Arena, Split; Attendance: 8,700; Referees: Nikolov, Nachevski (MKD)
12 January 2018; 18:15	2× (yellow card) 4× (suspension)	Report	3× (yellow card) 2× (suspension)	Spaladium Arena, Split; Attendance: 8,700; Referees: Nikolov, Nachevski (MKD)

12 January 2018; 20:30	Croatia	32–22	Serbia	Spaladium Arena, Split; Attendance: 11,000; Referees: Geipel, Helbig (GER)
12 January 2018; 20:30	Stepančić, Štrlek 6	(14–9)	Nenadić 6	Spaladium Arena, Split; Attendance: 11,000; Referees: Geipel, Helbig (GER)
12 January 2018; 20:30	2× (yellow card) 3× (suspension)	Report	1× (yellow card) 4× (suspension)	Spaladium Arena, Split; Attendance: 11,000; Referees: Geipel, Helbig (GER)

14 January 2018; 18:15	Serbia	25–30	Sweden	Spaladium Arena, Split; Attendance: 9,500; Referees: Gjeding, Hansen (DEN)
14 January 2018; 18:15	Ilić 5	(10–16)	Lagergren 5	Spaladium Arena, Split; Attendance: 9,500; Referees: Gjeding, Hansen (DEN)
14 January 2018; 18:15	1× (yellow card) 4× (suspension)	Report	2× (yellow card) 6× (suspension)	Spaladium Arena, Split; Attendance: 9,500; Referees: Gjeding, Hansen (DEN)

14 January 2018; 20:30	Iceland	22–29	Croatia	Spaladium Arena, Split; Attendance: 10,500; Referees: Zotin, Volotkov (RUS)
14 January 2018; 20:30	Pálmarsson 5	(13–14)	Cindrić 7	Spaladium Arena, Split; Attendance: 10,500; Referees: Zotin, Volotkov (RUS)
14 January 2018; 20:30	4× (yellow card)	Report	3× (yellow card) 2× (suspension)	Spaladium Arena, Split; Attendance: 10,500; Referees: Zotin, Volotkov (RUS)

16 January 2018; 18:15	Serbia	29–26	Iceland	Spaladium Arena, Split; Attendance: 9,800; Referees: Raluy, Sabroso (ESP)
16 January 2018; 18:15	Radivojević, Šešum 5	(12–12)	Sigurðsson 8	Spaladium Arena, Split; Attendance: 9,800; Referees: Raluy, Sabroso (ESP)
16 January 2018; 18:15	2× (yellow card) 3× (suspension)	Report	3× (yellow card) 4× (suspension)	Spaladium Arena, Split; Attendance: 9,800; Referees: Raluy, Sabroso (ESP)

16 January 2018; 20:30	Croatia	31–35	Sweden	Spaladium Arena, Split; Attendance: 11,000; Referees: Horáček, Novotný (CZE)
16 January 2018; 20:30	Čupić 7	(12–17)	Lagergren 6	Spaladium Arena, Split; Attendance: 11,000; Referees: Horáček, Novotný (CZE)
16 January 2018; 20:30	3× (yellow card) 4× (suspension)	Report	2× (yellow card) 5× (suspension)	Spaladium Arena, Split; Attendance: 11,000; Referees: Horáček, Novotný (CZE)

=== Group B ===
Pos	Team	Pld	W	D	L	GF	GA	GD	Pts	Qualification
1	France	3	3	0	0	97	82	+15	6	Main round
2	Norway	3	2	0	1	103	88	+15	4	Main round
3	Belarus	3	1	0	2	80	91	−11	2	Main round
4	Austria	3	0	0	3	80	99	−19	0	

Source: EHF
Rules for classification: 1) points; 2) head-to-head points; 3) head-to-head goal difference; 4) head-to-head number of goals scored; 5) goal difference.

12 January 2018; 18:15	Belarus	27–26	Austria	Žatika Sport Centre, Poreč; Attendance: 3,100; Referees: Horáček, Novotný (CZE)
12 January 2018; 18:15	Kulesh 7	(14–12)	Bilyk 8	Žatika Sport Centre, Poreč; Attendance: 3,100; Referees: Horáček, Novotný (CZE)
12 January 2018; 18:15	3× (yellow card) 4× (suspension)	Report	2× (yellow card) 7× (suspension) 1× (red card)	Žatika Sport Centre, Poreč; Attendance: 3,100; Referees: Horáček, Novotný (CZE)

12 January 2018; 20:30	France	32–31	Norway	Žatika Sport Centre, Poreč; Attendance: 3,600; Referees: Raluy, Sabroso (ESP)
12 January 2018; 20:30	Mahé 8	(15–17)	Tønnesen 7	Žatika Sport Centre, Poreč; Attendance: 3,600; Referees: Raluy, Sabroso (ESP)
12 January 2018; 20:30	2× (yellow card) 2× (suspension)	Report	3× (yellow card) 3× (suspension)	Žatika Sport Centre, Poreč; Attendance: 3,600; Referees: Raluy, Sabroso (ESP)

14 January 2018; 18:15	Austria	26–33	France	Žatika Sport Centre, Poreč; Attendance: 2,900; Referees: Geipel, Helbig (GER)
14 January 2018; 18:15	Weber 5	(12–17)	N'Guessan 7	Žatika Sport Centre, Poreč; Attendance: 2,900; Referees: Geipel, Helbig (GER)
14 January 2018; 18:15	1× (yellow card) 5× (suspension) 1× (red card)	Report	3× (suspension)	Žatika Sport Centre, Poreč; Attendance: 2,900; Referees: Geipel, Helbig (GER)

14 January 2018; 20:30	Norway	33–28	Belarus	Žatika Sport Centre, Poreč; Attendance: 2,500; Referees: Nikolov, Nachevski (MKD)
14 January 2018; 20:30	three players 6	(15–12)	Karalek 5	Žatika Sport Centre, Poreč; Attendance: 2,500; Referees: Nikolov, Nachevski (MKD)
14 January 2018; 20:30	3× (yellow card) 2× (suspension)	Report	3× (yellow card) 6× (suspension)	Žatika Sport Centre, Poreč; Attendance: 2,500; Referees: Nikolov, Nachevski (MKD)

16 January 2018; 18:15	France	32–25	Belarus	Žatika Sport Centre, Poreč; Attendance: 2,300; Referees: Mažeika, Gatelis (LTU)
16 January 2018; 18:15	Mem 9	(14–11)	Padshyvalau 6	Žatika Sport Centre, Poreč; Attendance: 2,300; Referees: Mažeika, Gatelis (LTU)
16 January 2018; 18:15	3× (yellow card) 2× (suspension)	Report	1× (yellow card) 4× (suspension) 1× (red card)	Žatika Sport Centre, Poreč; Attendance: 2,300; Referees: Mažeika, Gatelis (LTU)

16 January 2018; 20:30	Norway	39–28	Austria	Žatika Sport Centre, Poreč; Attendance: 1,600; Referees: Gjeding, Hansen (DEN)
16 January 2018; 20:30	Bjørnsen 9	(18–14)	Bilyk 9	Žatika Sport Centre, Poreč; Attendance: 1,600; Referees: Gjeding, Hansen (DEN)
16 January 2018; 20:30	2× (yellow card) 6× (suspension)	Report	3× (yellow card) 5× (suspension) 2× (red card)	Žatika Sport Centre, Poreč; Attendance: 1,600; Referees: Gjeding, Hansen (DEN)

=== Group C ===
Pos	Team	Pld	W	D	L	GF	GA	GD	Pts	Qualification
1	Macedonia	3	2	1	0	79	77	+2	5	Main round
2	Germany	3	1	2	0	82	69	+13	4	Main round
3	Slovenia	3	1	1	1	77	69	+8	3	Main round
4	Montenegro	3	0	0	3	66	89	−23	0	

Source: EHF
Rules for classification: 1) points; 2) head-to-head points; 3) head-to-head goal difference; 4) head-to-head number of goals scored; 5) goal difference.

13 January 2018; 17:15	Germany	32–19	Montenegro	Arena Zagreb, Zagreb; Attendance: 8,000; Referees: Pichon, Reveret (FRA)
13 January 2018; 17:15	Gensheimer 9	(17–9)	Lipovina 7	Arena Zagreb, Zagreb; Attendance: 8,000; Referees: Pichon, Reveret (FRA)
13 January 2018; 17:15	3× (yellow card) 8× (suspension) 1× (red card)	Report	2× (yellow card) 4× (suspension)	Arena Zagreb, Zagreb; Attendance: 8,000; Referees: Pichon, Reveret (FRA)

13 January 2018; 19:30	Macedonia	25–24	Slovenia	Arena Zagreb, Zagreb; Attendance: 11,000; Referees: Dinu, Din (ROU)
13 January 2018; 19:30	Manaskov 8	(11–11)	Mlakar 4	Arena Zagreb, Zagreb; Attendance: 11,000; Referees: Dinu, Din (ROU)
13 January 2018; 19:30	4× (yellow card) 6× (suspension)	Report	4× (yellow card) 11× (suspension) 1× (red card)	Arena Zagreb, Zagreb; Attendance: 11,000; Referees: Dinu, Din (ROU)

15 January 2018; 18:15	Slovenia	25–25	Germany	Arena Zagreb, Zagreb; Attendance: 6,500; Referees: Mažeika, Gatelis (LTU)
15 January 2018; 18:15	Zarabec 5	(15–10)	Gensheimer 7	Arena Zagreb, Zagreb; Attendance: 6,500; Referees: Mažeika, Gatelis (LTU)
15 January 2018; 18:15	4× (yellow card) 8× (suspension) 1× (red card)	Report	4× (yellow card) 3× (suspension)	Arena Zagreb, Zagreb; Attendance: 6,500; Referees: Mažeika, Gatelis (LTU)

15 January 2018; 20:30	Montenegro	28–29	Macedonia	Arena Zagreb, Zagreb; Attendance: 5,000; Referees: Santos, Fonseca (POR)
15 January 2018; 20:30	Čavor 6	(16–15)	Kuzmanovski 5	Arena Zagreb, Zagreb; Attendance: 5,000; Referees: Santos, Fonseca (POR)
15 January 2018; 20:30	2× (yellow card) 7× (suspension) 1× (red card)	Report	2× (yellow card) 8× (suspension)	Arena Zagreb, Zagreb; Attendance: 5,000; Referees: Santos, Fonseca (POR)

17 January 2018; 18:15	Germany	25–25	Macedonia	Arena Zagreb, Zagreb; Attendance: 5,100; Referees: Gousko, Repkin (BLR)
17 January 2018; 18:15	Weinhold 8	(12–11)	Taleski 6	Arena Zagreb, Zagreb; Attendance: 5,100; Referees: Gousko, Repkin (BLR)
17 January 2018; 18:15	3× (yellow card) 3× (suspension)	Report	3× (yellow card) 2× (suspension)	Arena Zagreb, Zagreb; Attendance: 5,100; Referees: Gousko, Repkin (BLR)

17 January 2018; 20:30	Montenegro	19–28	Slovenia	Arena Zagreb, Zagreb; Attendance: 6,200; Referees: Gubica, Milošević (CRO)
17 January 2018; 20:30	Ševaljević 6	(13–14)	Marguč 6	Arena Zagreb, Zagreb; Attendance: 6,200; Referees: Gubica, Milošević (CRO)
17 January 2018; 20:30	3× (yellow card) 5× (suspension)	Report	2× (yellow card) 5× (suspension) 1× (red card)	Arena Zagreb, Zagreb; Attendance: 6,200; Referees: Gubica, Milošević (CRO)

=== Group D ===
Pos	Team	Pld	W	D	L	GF	GA	GD	Pts	Qualification
1	Spain	3	2	0	1	81	65	+16	4 (Note: Spain 2 Pts, +14 GD; Denmark 2 Pts, +2 GD; Czech Republic 2 Pts, −16 GD)	Main round
2	Denmark	3	2	0	1	84	75	+9	4	Main round
3	Czech Republic	3	2	0	1	76	86	−10	4	Main round
4	Hungary	3	0	0	3	77	92	−15	0	

Source: EHF
Rules for classification: 1) points; 2) head-to-head points; 3) head-to-head goal difference; 4) head-to-head number of goals scored; 5) goal difference.
Notes:

13 January 2018; 18:15	Spain	32–15	Czech Republic	Varaždin Arena, Varaždin; Attendance: 3,780; Referees: Santos, Fonseca (POR)
13 January 2018; 18:15	three players 5	(16–9)	Kašpárek 5	Varaždin Arena, Varaždin; Attendance: 3,780; Referees: Santos, Fonseca (POR)
13 January 2018; 18:15	1× (yellow card) 2× (suspension)	Report	2× (yellow card) 4× (suspension)	Varaždin Arena, Varaždin; Attendance: 3,780; Referees: Santos, Fonseca (POR)

13 January 2018; 20:30	Denmark	32–25	Hungary	Varaždin Arena, Varaždin; Attendance: 5,170; Referees: Gubica, Milošević (CRO)
13 January 2018; 20:30	Lauge Schmidt 7	(14–12)	Lékai 5	Varaždin Arena, Varaždin; Attendance: 5,170; Referees: Gubica, Milošević (CRO)
13 January 2018; 20:30	2× (yellow card) 5× (suspension) 1× (red card)	Report	3× (yellow card) 5× (suspension)	Varaždin Arena, Varaždin; Attendance: 5,170; Referees: Gubica, Milošević (CRO)

15 January 2018; 18:15	Hungary	25–27	Spain	Varaždin Arena, Varaždin; Attendance: 3,470; Referees: Dinu, Din (ROU)
15 January 2018; 18:15	Bánhidi 6	(12–13)	four players 4	Varaždin Arena, Varaždin; Attendance: 3,470; Referees: Dinu, Din (ROU)
15 January 2018; 18:15	4× (yellow card) 5× (suspension)	Report	4× (yellow card) 2× (suspension)	Varaždin Arena, Varaždin; Attendance: 3,470; Referees: Dinu, Din (ROU)

15 January 2018; 20:30	Czech Republic	28–27	Denmark	Varaždin Arena, Varaždin; Attendance: 4,100; Referees: Gousko, Repkin (BLR)
15 January 2018; 20:30	Zdráhala 8	(15–16)	Hansen 7	Varaždin Arena, Varaždin; Attendance: 4,100; Referees: Gousko, Repkin (BLR)
15 January 2018; 20:30	3× (yellow card) 4× (suspension)	Report	2× (yellow card) 3× (suspension)	Varaždin Arena, Varaždin; Attendance: 4,100; Referees: Gousko, Repkin (BLR)

17 January 2018; 18:15	Czech Republic	33–27	Hungary	Varaždin Arena, Varaždin; Attendance: 3,790; Referees: Pichon, Reveret (FRA)
17 January 2018; 18:15	Zdráhala 14	(15–11)	Lékai 9	Varaždin Arena, Varaždin; Attendance: 3,790; Referees: Pichon, Reveret (FRA)
17 January 2018; 18:15	2× (yellow card) 3× (suspension) 1× (red card)	Report	1× (yellow card) 1× (suspension)	Varaždin Arena, Varaždin; Attendance: 3,790; Referees: Pichon, Reveret (FRA)

17 January 2018; 20:30	Spain	22–25	Denmark	Varaždin Arena, Varaždin; Attendance: 4,100; Referees: Zotin, Volodkov (RUS)
17 January 2018; 20:30	A. Dujshebaev 6	(13–14)	Balling 8	Varaždin Arena, Varaždin; Attendance: 4,100; Referees: Zotin, Volodkov (RUS)
17 January 2018; 20:30	3× (yellow card) 1× (suspension)	Report	3× (yellow card) 3× (suspension)	Varaždin Arena, Varaždin; Attendance: 4,100; Referees: Zotin, Volodkov (RUS)

== Main round ==
Points and goals gained in the preliminary group against teams that advanced, were taken over.

=== Group I ===
Pos	Team	Pld	W	D	L	GF	GA	GD	Pts	Qualification
1	France	5	5	0	0	156	130	+26	10	Advanced to semifinals
2	Sweden	5	3	0	2	136	127	+9	6 (Note: Sweden 2 Pts, +1 GD; Croatia 2 Pts, 0 GD; Norway 2 Pts, −1 GD)	Advanced to semifinals
3	Croatia (H)	5	3	0	2	147	138	+9	6	Advanced to fifth place game
4	Norway	5	3	0	2	152	144	+8	6	
5	Belarus	5	1	0	4	128	146	−18	2	
6	Serbia	5	0	0	5	131	165	−34	0	

Source: EHF
Rules for classification: 1) points; 2) head-to-head points; 3) head-to-head goal difference; 4) head-to-head number of goals scored; 5) Goal difference.
(H) Hosts
Notes:

18 January 2018; 18:15	Serbia	27–32	Norway	Arena Zagreb, Zagreb; Attendance: 3,200; Referees: Santos, Fonseca (POR)
18 January 2018; 18:15	Beljanski, Šešum 5	(17–17)	Bjørnsen, Sagosen 8	Arena Zagreb, Zagreb; Attendance: 3,200; Referees: Santos, Fonseca (POR)
18 January 2018; 18:15	2× (yellow card) 4× (suspension)	Report	1× (yellow card) 3× (suspension)	Arena Zagreb, Zagreb; Attendance: 3,200; Referees: Santos, Fonseca (POR)

18 January 2018; 20:30	Croatia	25–23	Belarus	Arena Zagreb, Zagreb; Attendance: 8,100; Referees: Zotin, Volodkov (RUS)
18 January 2018; 20:30	Mamić, Stepančić 5	(15–12)	Yurynok 6	Arena Zagreb, Zagreb; Attendance: 8,100; Referees: Zotin, Volodkov (RUS)
18 January 2018; 20:30	4× (yellow card) 1× (suspension)	Report	3× (yellow card) 3× (suspension) 1× (red card)	Arena Zagreb, Zagreb; Attendance: 8,100; Referees: Zotin, Volodkov (RUS)

20 January 2018; 18:15	Sweden	17–23	France	Arena Zagreb, Zagreb; Attendance: 7,100; Referees: Raluy, Sabroso (ESP)
20 January 2018; 18:15	Jeppsson 4	(8–10)	Sorhaindo 5	Arena Zagreb, Zagreb; Attendance: 7,100; Referees: Raluy, Sabroso (ESP)
20 January 2018; 18:15	2× (yellow card) 4× (suspension)	Report	3× (yellow card) 2× (suspension) 1× (red card)	Arena Zagreb, Zagreb; Attendance: 7,100; Referees: Raluy, Sabroso (ESP)

20 January 2018; 20:30	Croatia	32–28	Norway	Arena Zagreb, Zagreb; Attendance: 13,000; Referees: Dinu, Din (ROU)
20 January 2018; 20:30	Štrlek 6	(17–15)	Sagosen 8	Arena Zagreb, Zagreb; Attendance: 13,000; Referees: Dinu, Din (ROU)
20 January 2018; 20:30	4× (yellow card) 6× (suspension)	Report	3× (yellow card) 2× (suspension)	Arena Zagreb, Zagreb; Attendance: 13,000; Referees: Dinu, Din (ROU)

22 January 2018; 18:15	Serbia	30–39	France	Arena Zagreb, Zagreb; Attendance: 1,700; Referees: Gjeding, Hansen (DEN)
22 January 2018; 18:15	Zelenović 7	(12–19)	Caucheteux, L. Karabatic 7	Arena Zagreb, Zagreb; Attendance: 1,700; Referees: Gjeding, Hansen (DEN)
22 January 2018; 18:15	1× (yellow card) 4× (suspension) 1× (red card)	Report	3× (suspension)	Arena Zagreb, Zagreb; Attendance: 1,700; Referees: Gjeding, Hansen (DEN)

22 January 2018; 20:30	Sweden	29–20	Belarus	Arena Zagreb, Zagreb; Attendance: 1,400; Referees: Horáček, Novotný (CZE)
22 January 2018; 20:30	Lagergren, Wanne 4	(16–11)	Karalek, Kulesh 4	Arena Zagreb, Zagreb; Attendance: 1,400; Referees: Horáček, Novotný (CZE)
22 January 2018; 20:30	3× (yellow card) 4× (suspension)	Report	1× (yellow card) 4× (suspension)	Arena Zagreb, Zagreb; Attendance: 1,400; Referees: Horáček, Novotný (CZE)

24 January 2018; 16:00	Serbia	27–32	Belarus	Arena Zagreb, Zagreb; Attendance: 1,000; Referees: Raluy, Sabroso (ESP)
24 January 2018; 16:00	Nenadić 7	(11–16)	Pukhouski 9	Arena Zagreb, Zagreb; Attendance: 1,000; Referees: Raluy, Sabroso (ESP)
24 January 2018; 16:00	2× (yellow card) 5× (suspension)	Report	3× (yellow card) 4× (suspension)	Arena Zagreb, Zagreb; Attendance: 1,000; Referees: Raluy, Sabroso (ESP)

24 January 2018; 18:15	Sweden	25–28	Norway	Arena Zagreb, Zagreb; Attendance: 8,100; Referees: Nikolov, Nachevski (MKD)
24 January 2018; 18:15	Tollbring 6	(11–12)	Myrhol 7	Arena Zagreb, Zagreb; Attendance: 8,100; Referees: Nikolov, Nachevski (MKD)
24 January 2018; 18:15	2× (yellow card) 3× (suspension) 1× (red card)	Report	4× (yellow card) 6× (suspension)	Arena Zagreb, Zagreb; Attendance: 8,100; Referees: Nikolov, Nachevski (MKD)

24 January 2018; 20:30	Croatia	27–30	France	Arena Zagreb, Zagreb; Attendance: 14,000; Referees: Geipel, Helbig (GER)
24 January 2018; 20:30	Štrlek 6	(13–19)	Remili 6	Arena Zagreb, Zagreb; Attendance: 14,000; Referees: Geipel, Helbig (GER)
24 January 2018; 20:30	3× (yellow card) 3× (suspension)	Report	5× (suspension)	Arena Zagreb, Zagreb; Attendance: 14,000; Referees: Geipel, Helbig (GER)

=== Group II ===
Pos	Team	Pld	W	D	L	GF	GA	GD	Pts	Qualification
1	Denmark	5	4	0	1	140	123	+17	8	Advanced to semifinals
2	Spain	5	3	0	2	142	118	+24	6	Advanced to semifinals
3	Czech Republic	5	2	1	2	113	131	−18	5	Advanced to fifth place game
4	Slovenia	5	1	2	2	134	133	+1	4 (Note: Slovenia 25–25 Germany)	
5	Germany	5	1	2	2	124	126	−2	4	
6	Macedonia	5	1	1	3	114	136	−22	3	

Source: EHF
Rules for classification: 1) points; 2) head-to-head points; 3) head-to-head goal difference; 4) head-to-head number of goals scored; 5) Goal difference.
Notes:

19 January 2018; 18:15	Germany	22–19	Czech Republic	Varaždin Arena, Varaždin; Attendance: 2,130; Referees: Gubica, Milošević (CRO)
19 January 2018; 18:15	Fäth 8	(9–10)	Číp 6	Varaždin Arena, Varaždin; Attendance: 2,130; Referees: Gubica, Milošević (CRO)
19 January 2018; 18:15	2× (yellow card) 3× (suspension)	Report	3× (yellow card) 4× (suspension)	Varaždin Arena, Varaždin; Attendance: 2,130; Referees: Gubica, Milošević (CRO)

19 January 2018; 20:30	Slovenia	28–31	Denmark	Varaždin Arena, Varaždin; Attendance: 5,200; Referees: Pichon, Reveret (FRA)
19 January 2018; 20:30	Zarabec 6	(14–16)	Svan 11	Varaždin Arena, Varaždin; Attendance: 5,200; Referees: Pichon, Reveret (FRA)
19 January 2018; 20:30	2× (yellow card) 5× (suspension)	Report	2× (yellow card) 3× (suspension)	Varaždin Arena, Varaždin; Attendance: 5,200; Referees: Pichon, Reveret (FRA)

21 January 2018; 18:15	Germany	25–26	Denmark	Varaždin Arena, Varaždin; Attendance: 3,112; Referees: Gubica, Milošević (CRO)
21 January 2018; 18:15	Kühn 6	(9–8)	Lindberg 9	Varaždin Arena, Varaždin; Attendance: 3,112; Referees: Gubica, Milošević (CRO)
21 January 2018; 18:15	4× (yellow card) 3× (suspension)	Report	3× (yellow card) 1× (suspension)	Varaždin Arena, Varaždin; Attendance: 3,112; Referees: Gubica, Milošević (CRO)

21 January 2018; 20:30	Macedonia	20–31	Spain	Varaždin Arena, Varaždin; Attendance: 3,796; Referees: Gousko, Repkin (BLR)
21 January 2018; 20:30	Manaskov, Stoilov 4	(6–15)	Gurbindo 6	Varaždin Arena, Varaždin; Attendance: 3,796; Referees: Gousko, Repkin (BLR)
21 January 2018; 20:30	3× (yellow card) 1× (suspension)	Report	3× (yellow card) 3× (suspension)	Varaždin Arena, Varaždin; Attendance: 3,796; Referees: Gousko, Repkin (BLR)

23 January 2018; 18:15	Slovenia	31–26	Spain	Varaždin Arena, Varaždin; Attendance: 4,176; Referees: Dinu, Din (ROU)
23 January 2018; 18:15	Marguč 5	(13–12)	Solé 6	Varaždin Arena, Varaždin; Attendance: 4,176; Referees: Dinu, Din (ROU)
23 January 2018; 18:15	3× (yellow card) 8× (suspension)	Report	3× (yellow card) 3× (suspension) 1× (red card)	Varaždin Arena, Varaždin; Attendance: 4,176; Referees: Dinu, Din (ROU)

23 January 2018; 20:30	Macedonia	24–25	Czech Republic	Varaždin Arena, Varaždin; Attendance: 3,780; Referees: Zotin, Volodkov (RUS)
23 January 2018; 20:30	Taleski 5	(13–11)	Horák 8	Varaždin Arena, Varaždin; Attendance: 3,780; Referees: Zotin, Volodkov (RUS)
23 January 2018; 20:30	3× (yellow card) 2× (suspension)	Report	3× (yellow card) 5× (suspension) 1× (red card)	Varaždin Arena, Varaždin; Attendance: 3,780; Referees: Zotin, Volodkov (RUS)

24 January 2018; 16:00	Slovenia	26–26	Czech Republic	Varaždin Arena, Varaždin; Attendance: 2,873; Referees: Santos, Fonseca (POR)
24 January 2018; 16:00	three players 5	(11–12)	Zdráhala 9	Varaždin Arena, Varaždin; Attendance: 2,873; Referees: Santos, Fonseca (POR)
24 January 2018; 16:00	3× (yellow card) 2× (suspension)	Report	2× (yellow card) 4× (suspension) 2× (red card)	Varaždin Arena, Varaždin; Attendance: 2,873; Referees: Santos, Fonseca (POR)

24 January 2018; 18:15	Macedonia	20–31	Denmark	Varaždin Arena, Varaždin; Attendance: 2,343; Referees: Mažeika, Gatelis (LTU)
24 January 2018; 18:15	Kuzmanovski 6	(12–12)	Damgaard 11	Varaždin Arena, Varaždin; Attendance: 2,343; Referees: Mažeika, Gatelis (LTU)
24 January 2018; 18:15	1× (yellow card) 2× (suspension)	Report	3× (yellow card) 3× (suspension)	Varaždin Arena, Varaždin; Attendance: 2,343; Referees: Mažeika, Gatelis (LTU)

24 January 2018; 20:30	Germany	27–31	Spain	Varaždin Arena, Varaždin; Attendance: 1,289; Referees: Pichon, Reveret (FRA)
24 January 2018; 20:30	Hafner 5	(13–14)	Balaguer 6	Varaždin Arena, Varaždin; Attendance: 1,289; Referees: Pichon, Reveret (FRA)
24 January 2018; 20:30	3× (yellow card) 2× (suspension)	Report	3× (yellow card) 1× (suspension)	Varaždin Arena, Varaždin; Attendance: 1,289; Referees: Pichon, Reveret (FRA)

== Knockout stage ==
=== Bracket ===
Semifinals
26 January
France	23
Spain	27
26 January
Denmark	34
Sweden (ET)	35

Final
28 January
Spain	29
Sweden	23
Third place game
28 January
France	32
Denmark	29

=== Semifinals ===
26 January 2018; 18:00	France	23–27	Spain	Arena Zagreb, Zagreb; Attendance: 6,000; Referees: Nikolov, Nachevski (MKD)
26 January 2018; 18:00	Sorhaindo 6	(9–15)	Solé 7	Arena Zagreb, Zagreb; Attendance: 6,000; Referees: Nikolov, Nachevski (MKD)
26 January 2018; 18:00	3× (yellow card) 4× (suspension)	Report	3× (yellow card) 4× (suspension)	Arena Zagreb, Zagreb; Attendance: 6,000; Referees: Nikolov, Nachevski (MKD)

26 January 2018
20:30
Denmark
34–35 (ET)
Sweden
Arena Zagreb, Zagreb
Attendance: 9,000
Referees: Geipel, Helbig (GER)
Hansen 12
(14–16)
Zachrisson 8
1× (yellow card) 3× (suspension)
Report
1× (yellow card) 4× (suspension)

FT: 28–28 ET: 6–7

=== Fifth place game ===
26 January 2018; 15:30	Croatia	28–27	Czech Republic	Arena Zagreb, Zagreb; Attendance: 3,500; Referees: Raluy, Sabroso (ESP)
26 January 2018; 15:30	Horvat 10	(16–10)	Zdráhala 13	Arena Zagreb, Zagreb; Attendance: 3,500; Referees: Raluy, Sabroso (ESP)
26 January 2018; 15:30	4× (yellow card) 2× (suspension)	Report	3× (yellow card) 2× (suspension)	Arena Zagreb, Zagreb; Attendance: 3,500; Referees: Raluy, Sabroso (ESP)

=== Third place game ===
28 January 2018; 18:00	France	32–29	Denmark	Arena Zagreb, Zagreb; Attendance: 6,700; Referees: Dinu, Din (ROU)
28 January 2018; 18:00	N. Karabatić 9	(17–14)	Lindberg 12	Arena Zagreb, Zagreb; Attendance: 6,700; Referees: Dinu, Din (ROU)
28 January 2018; 18:00	4× (yellow card) 3× (suspension)	Report	3× (yellow card) 3× (suspension)	Arena Zagreb, Zagreb; Attendance: 6,700; Referees: Dinu, Din (ROU)

=== Final ===
28 January 2018; 20:30	Spain	29–23	Sweden	Arena Zagreb, Zagreb; Attendance: 9,000; Referees: Gubica, Milošević (CRO)
28 January 2018; 20:30	Balaguer, Solé 5	(12–14)	Nielsen 5	Arena Zagreb, Zagreb; Attendance: 9,000; Referees: Gubica, Milošević (CRO)
28 January 2018; 20:30	4× (yellow card) 2× (suspension)	Report	4× (yellow card) 3× (suspension)	Arena Zagreb, Zagreb; Attendance: 9,000; Referees: Gubica, Milošević (CRO)

== Ranking and statistics ==
=== Final ranking ===
Rank	Team
1st place, gold medalist(s)	Spain
2nd place, silver medalist(s)	Sweden
3rd place, bronze medalist(s)	France
4	Denmark
5	Croatia
6	Czech Republic
7	Norway
8	Slovenia
9	Germany
10	Belarus
11	Macedonia
12	Serbia
13	Iceland
14	Hungary
15	Austria
16	Montenegro

Qualified for 2019 World Men's Handball Championship as:
winner of this tournament
co-host
winner of 2017 World Championship

2018 Men's European Champions

Spain
First title

Team roster: Eduardo Gurbindo, Ángel Fernández Pérez, Valero Rivera Folch, Raúl Entrerríos, Alex Dujshebaev, Daniel Sarmiento Melián, Julen Aguinagalde, Arpad Šterbik, Joan Cañellas, Viran Morros, Aitor Ariño, Gedeón Guardiola, Iosu Goñi Leoz, Gonzalo Pérez de Vargas, Rodrigo Corrales, Ferrán Solé, David Balaguer, Adrià Figueras, Daniel Dujshebaev
Head coach: Jordi Ribera.

=== All-Star Team ===
The all-star team and awards were announced on 28 January 2018.

Position	Player
Goalkeeper	Vincent Gérard (FRA)
Right wing	Ferrán Solé (ESP)
Right back	Alex Dujshebaev (ESP)
Centre back	Sander Sagosen (NOR)
Left back	Mikkel Hansen (DEN)
Left wing	Manuel Štrlek (CRO)
Pivot	Jesper Nielsen (SWE)

=== Awards ===
Award	Player
Most Valuable Player	Jim Gottfridsson (SWE)
Best Defence Player	Jakov Gojun (CRO)
Topscorer	Ondřej Zdráhala (CZE) (55 goals)

=== Statistics ===
==== Top goalscorers ====
Rank	Name	Goals	Shots	%
1	(Czech Republic) Ondřej Zdráhala	56	96	57
2	(Denmark) Mikkel Hansen	43	79	54
3	(Denmark) Rasmus Lauge Schmidt	40	63	63
4	(Norway) Kristian Bjørnsen	37	50	74
5	(Spain) Ferrán Solé	36	47	77
6	(France) Kentin Mahé	34	49	69
7	(Czech Republic) Stanislav Kašpárek	33	66	50
8	(Norway) Sander Sagosen	32	54	59
9	(France) Nikola Karabatić	30	46	65
9	(Denmark) Hans Lindberg	30	37	81
9	(Serbia) Petar Nenadić	30	53	57

Source: Sportresult Archived 2018-01-16 at the Wayback Machine

==== Top goalkeepers ====
Rank	Name	%	Saves	Shots
1	(Slovenia) Urh Kastelic	41	22	54
2	(France) Vincent Gérard	37	68	184
3	(Denmark) Jannick Green	36	49	136
3	(Sweden) Andreas Palicka	36	50	138
5	(Sweden) Mikael Appelgren	35	69	195
5	(North Macedonia) Nikola Mitrevski	35	38	108
5	(Belarus) Viachaslau Saldatsenka	35	71	203
8	(Norway) Torbjørn Bergerud	34	73	212
8	(Germany) Silvio Heinevetter	34	26	76
8	(Czech Republic) Tomáš Mrkva	34	51	151
8	(Spain) Gonzalo Pérez de Vargas	34	52	151
8	(Germany) Andreas Wolff	34	43	126

Source: Sportresult Archived 2018-01-29 at the Wayback Machine
