= Vojtěch Patzel =

Czech handball player

Personal information
- Nationality: Czech
- Born: 23 September 1998 (age 28) Prague, Czech Republic
- Height: 1.90 m (6 ft 3 in)

Sport
- Sport: Handball
- Position: Left back
- Current club: HCB Karviná
- Number: 15

Senior clubs
- Years: Team
- –2020: HC Dukla Prague
- 2020–2022: HCB Karviná
- 2022–2024: VfL Lübeck-Schwartau
- 2024–: HCB Karviná
National team
Years	Team	Apps	(Gls)
2018-	Czech Republic	43	(67)
- Updated on 9 July 2024

Vojtěch Patzel (born 23 September 1998) is a Czech handball player for HCB Karviná and the Czech national team.

He represented the Czech Republic at the 2020 European Men's Handball Championship.
