= Roman Bečvář (handballer, born 1989) =

Czech handball player

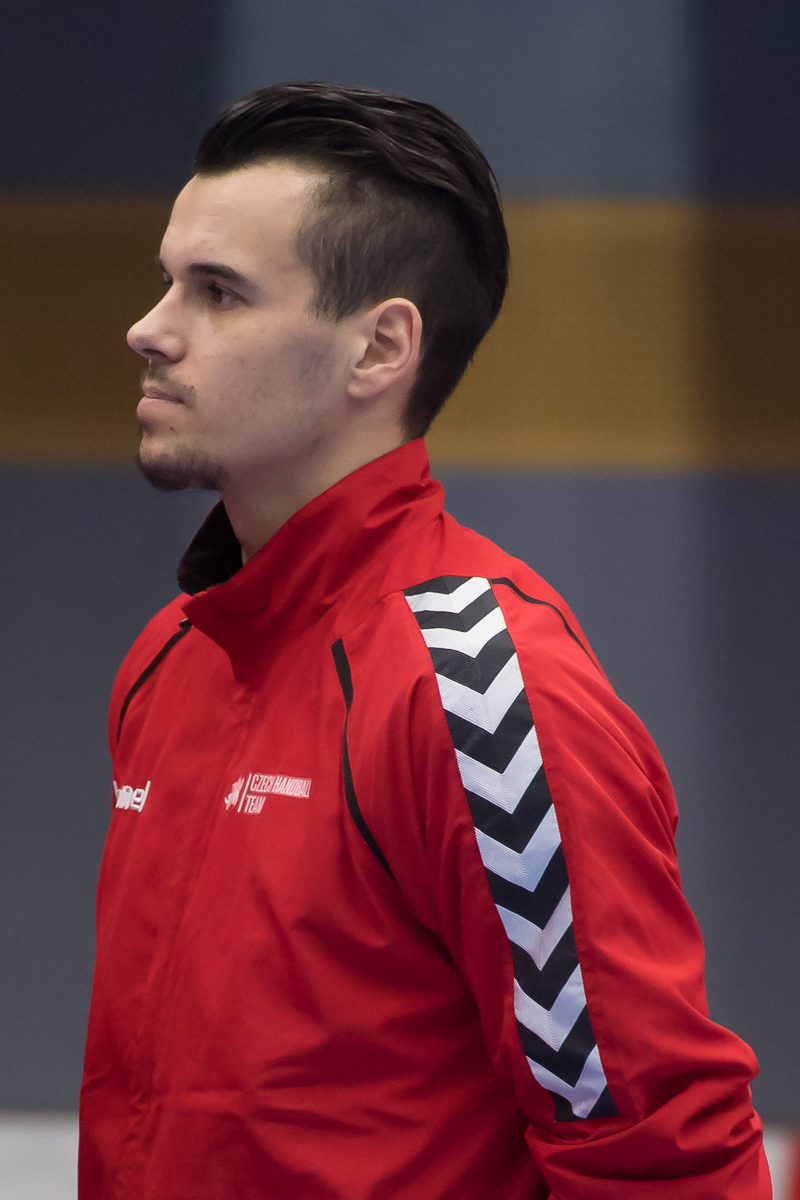

Personal information
- Nationality: Czech
- Born: 18 April 1989 (age 37) Plzeň, Czechoslovakia
- Height: 1.91 m (6 ft 3 in)

Sport
- Sport: Handball
- Position: Centre back
- Current club: Red Boys Differdange

Senior clubs
- Years: Team
- 2013–2021: TuS Nettelstedt-Lübbecke
- 2021–: Red Boys Differdange
National team
Years	Team	Apps	(Gls)
2014–	Czech Republic	120	(248)

Roman Bečvář (born 18 April 1989) is a Czech handball player for Red Boys Differdange and the Czech national team.

He participated at the 2018 European Men's Handball Championship.
