= Czech Handball Association =

Governing body of handball in the Czech Republic

Czech Handball Association Czech: Český svaz házené CHA
- IOC nation: Czech Republic (CZE)
- Sport: Handball
- Other sports: Beach handball
- Official website: www.handball.cz

HISTORY
- Year of formation: 1968; 58 years ago

AFFILIATIONS
- International federation: International Handball Federation (IHF)
- IHF member since: 1993
- Continental association: European Handball Federation
- National Olympic Committee: Czech Olympic Committee

GOVERNING BODY
- President: Ondřej Zdráhala

HEADQUARTERS
- Address: Budejovicka 778/3a, 140 00 Prague 4
- Country: Czech Republic
- Secretary General: Mrs. Sarka Drozdova

The Czech Handball Association (Czech: Český svaz házené) (CHA) is the administrative and controlling body for handball and beach handball in Czech Republic. Founded in 1968, CHA is a member of European Handball Federation (EHF) and the International Handball Federation (IHF).

== National teams ==
- Czech Republic men's national handball team
- Czech Republic men's national junior handball team
- Czech Republic women's national handball team

== Competitions ==
- Czech Handball Extraliga
- Czech Women's Handball First Division
