= Tomáš Mrkva =

Czech handball player

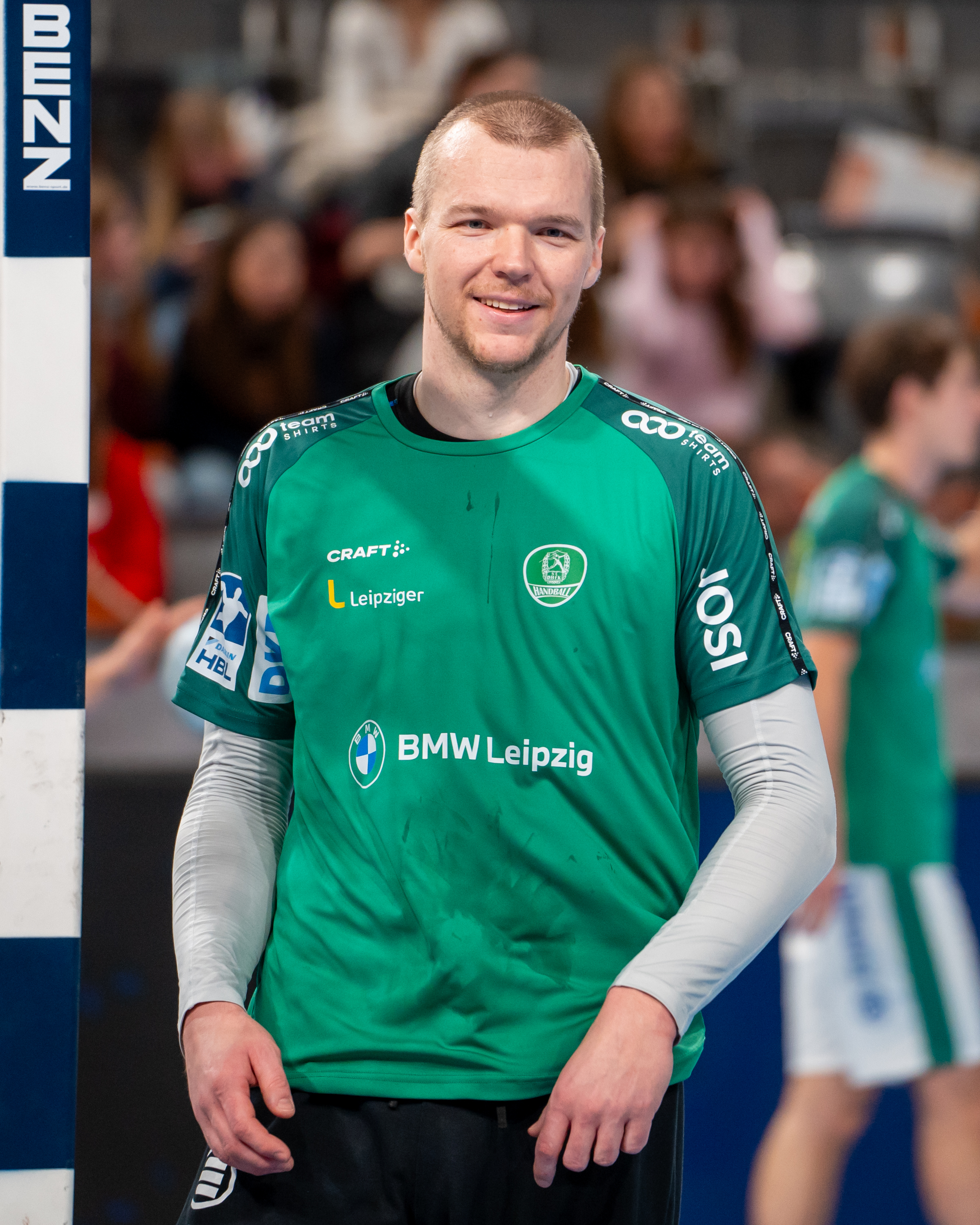
- Mrkva in 2025

Personal information
- Nationality: Czech
- Born: 20 January 1989 (age 37) Havířov, Czechoslovakia
- Height: 2.03 m (6 ft 8 in)

Sport
- Sport: Handball
- Position: Goalkeeper
- Current club: SC DHfK Leipzig Handball
- Number: 16

Youth career
- Years: Team
- –: HCB Karviná

Senior clubs
- Years: Team
- 2006–2010: HCB Karviná
- 2010–2012: ASV Hamm-Westfalen
- 2012–2013: Frisch Auf Göppingen
- 2013–2016: ASV Hamm-Westfalen
- 2016–2019: HBW Balingen-Weilstetten
- 2019–2022: Bergischer HC
- 2022–2025: THW Kiel
- 2025–: SC DHfK Leipzig Handball
National team
Years	Team	Apps	(Gls)
–	Czech Republic	97	(5)

Tomáš Mrkva (born 20 January 1989) is a Czech professional handball player for SC DHfK Leipzig and the Czech national team.

== Achievements ==
- Czech Handball Extraliga:
  - Gold: 2007, 2008, 2009. 2010
- Czech Cup:
  - Gold: 2007, 2008
- Handball-Bundesliga:
  - Gold: 2023
- DHB-Pokal
  - Gold: 2025
- DHB-Supercup:
  - Gold: 2022, 2023
