= Jakub Szymanski (handballer) =

Czech handball player

Personal information
- Nationality: Czech
- Born: 9 February 1983 (age 43) Havířov, Czechoslovakia
- Height: 1.98 m (6 ft 6 in)

Sport
- Sport: Handball
- Position: Centre back

Senior clubs
- Years: Team
- –: HCB Karviná
- 2016–2019: BSV Bern
- –: TSV St. Otmar St. Gallen
- –: GC Amicitia Zürich
National team
Years	Team	Apps	(Gls)
–	Czech Republic	41	(52)

Jakub Szymanski (born 9 February 1983) is a Czech handball player. Most notably he played for the Czech national team at the 2015 World Men's Handball Championship in Qatar.
