= Jan Sobol =

Czech handball player

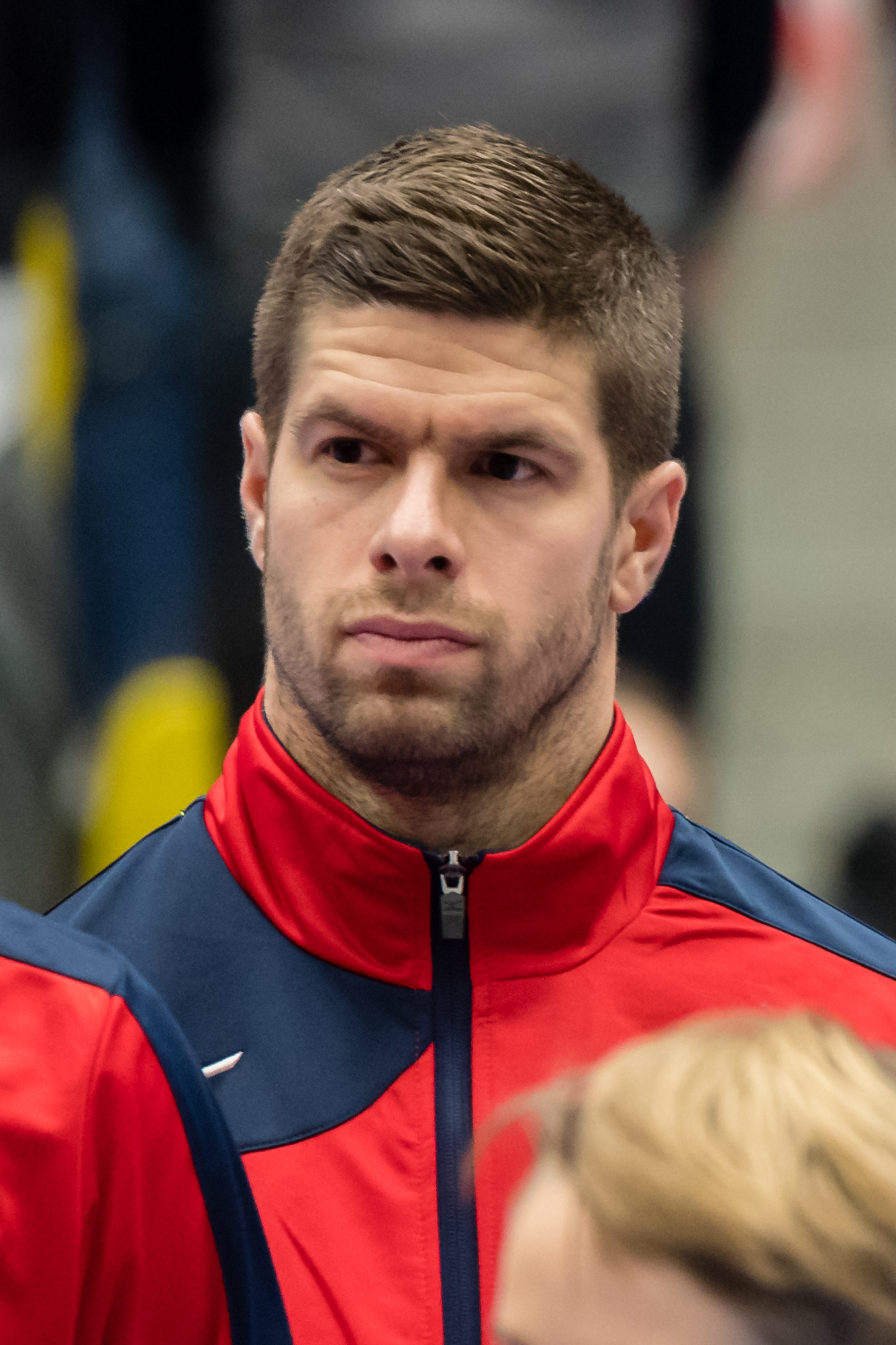

Personal information
- Nationality: Czech
- Born: 22 May 1984 (age 42) Karviná, Czechoslovakia
- Height: 1.88 m (6 ft 2 in)

Sport
- Sport: Handball
- Position: Right wing

Senior clubs
- Years: Team
- 2004–2007: HC Baník Karviná
- 2007–2010: Montpellier HB
- 2010–2011: HT Tatran Prešov
- 2011–2012: RK Vardar PRO
- 2012–2013: HT Tatran Prešov
- 2013–2017: KS Azoty-Puławy
- 2017–: Dijon Bourgogne HB
National team
| Years | Team | Apps | (Gls) |
| – | Czech Republic | 101 | (274) |

Jan Sobol (born 22 May 1984) is a Czech handball player, currently playing for Dijon Bourgogne HB and the Czech national handball team.
