= Varaždin Arena =

Multi-use indoor arena in Varaždin, Croatia

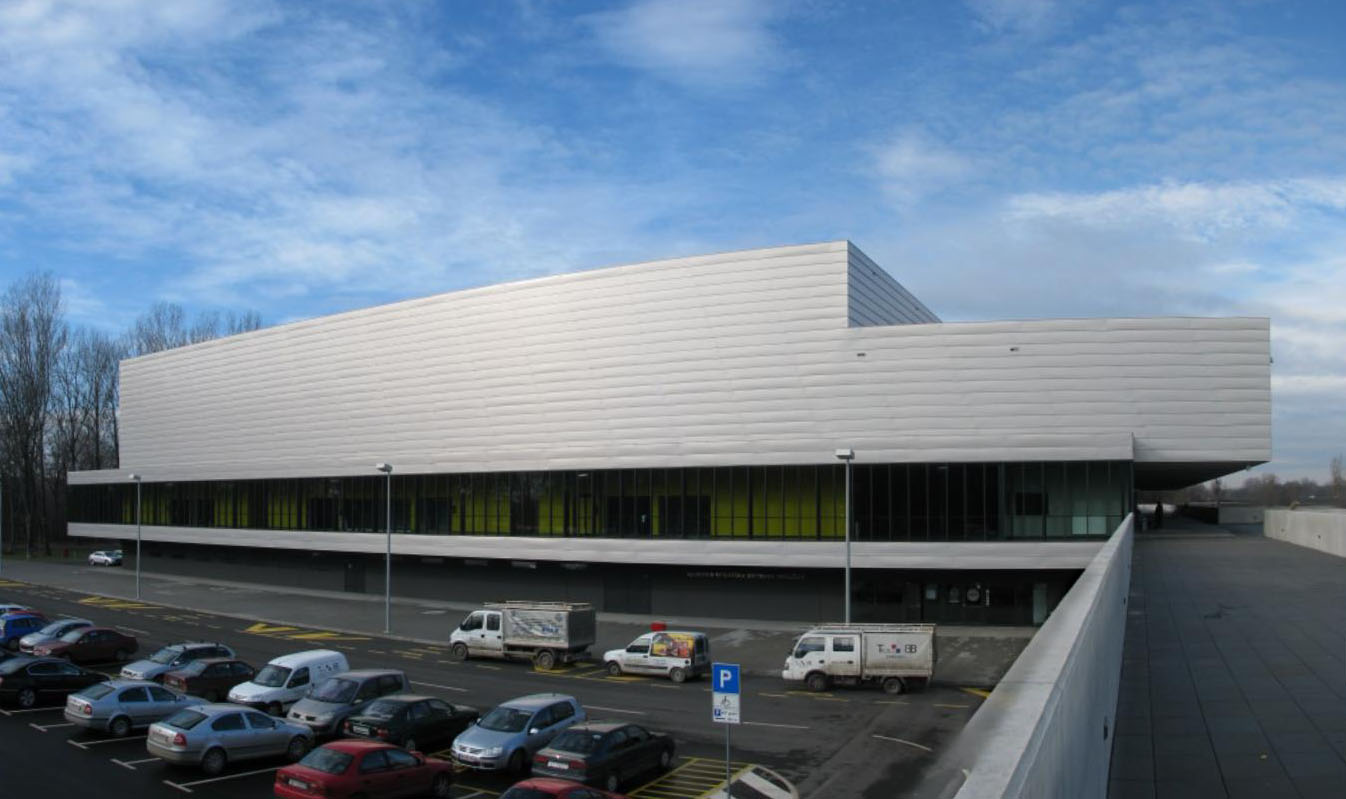
- Interactive map of Varaždin Arena
- Full name: Gradska dvorana Varaždin
- Address: Šetalište Franje Tuđmana 1
- Location: Varaždin, Croatia
- Coordinates: 46.3169843°N 16.3610673°E
- Owner: City of Varaždin
- Capacity: 5,033 (handball)

Construction
- Opened: 6 December 2008; 17 years ago
- Cost: € 26,5 million HRK 193 million
- Architect: Max Bögl

Tenants
- GRK Varaždin (2009–present); KK Vindi (2009–present); RK Koka (2009–present); RK Varteks Di Caprio (2009–present); RK Zagreb (2016–present)

Website
- arena-varazdin.hr

The Varaždin Arena is a multi-use indoor arena in Varaždin, Croatia. It is used mostly for team handball, volleyball and basketball games. The stadium has a capacity of 5,000 and was officially opened on 6 December 2008. It was completed to be used as one of the venues during the 2009 World Men's Handball Championship hosted in Croatia. It hosted all the Group C matches which consisted of Germany, Macedonia, Algeria, Poland, and Russia.

The arena was also used to host the 2018 European Men's Handball Championship and 2025 World Men's Handball Championship.

The arena has played host to various events other than sports, such as dancing championships, various expos, school affiliated events, circuses, auto-shows, and concerts. In its short history the arena hosted numerous artists such as: Đorđe Balašević, Zdravko Čolić, Limp Bizkit, Mišo Kovač, Dino Merlin, Plavi Orkestar, Gibonni, Bambi Molesters, Halid Bešlić, Crvena Jabuka and Parni Valjak.

== Sports ==
- 2009 World Men's Handball Championship (Group C matches)
- March 2010: 2010 Davis Cup, Croatia vs. Ecuador
- 2018 European Men's Handball Championship
- 2025 World Men's Handball Championship
- March 12-16, 2026: WTT Feeder 2026, international table tennis competition.

== Concerts ==
(incomplete)

- Tony Cetinski performed a concert during the Karlovačko Live 2012 - December 26, 2012
- Lijepom našom HRT television music show held the filming event - December 5, 2012
- Gregorian (band) performed a concert during their Epic Chants World Tour 2013 - April 5, 2013
- 2Cellos performed a concert - June 1, 2013
- Les Misérables (Jadnici) the musical was performed - September 27, 2013
- Severina Vučković performed a sold-out concert during her Dobrodošao u Klub Tour - November 8, 2013
- Goran Bregović performed a concert promoting his album Champagne for the Gypsies - November 30, 2013
- Klape i Tamburaši performed a joined concert - December 6, 2013
- Neno Belan & Fiumens held a Big Christmas concert - December 20, 2013

== Gallery ==
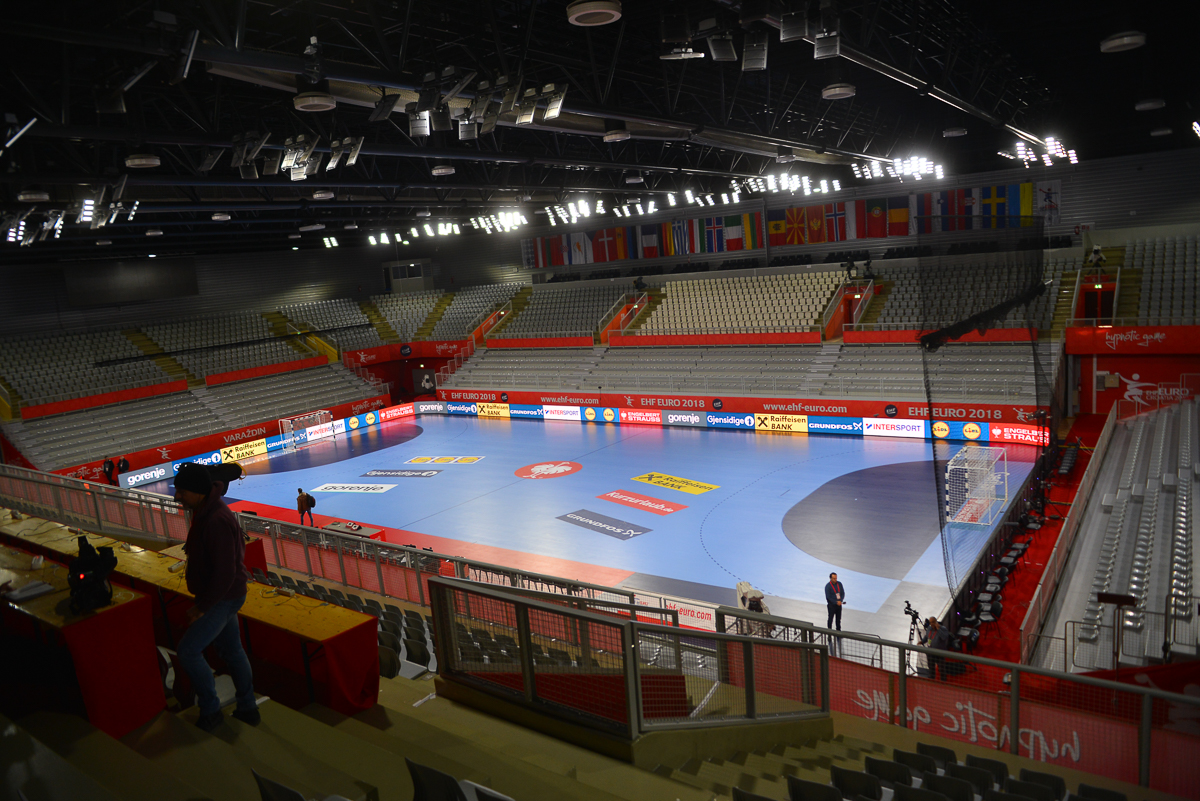
Varaždin Arena ahead of the 2018 European Men's Handball Championship

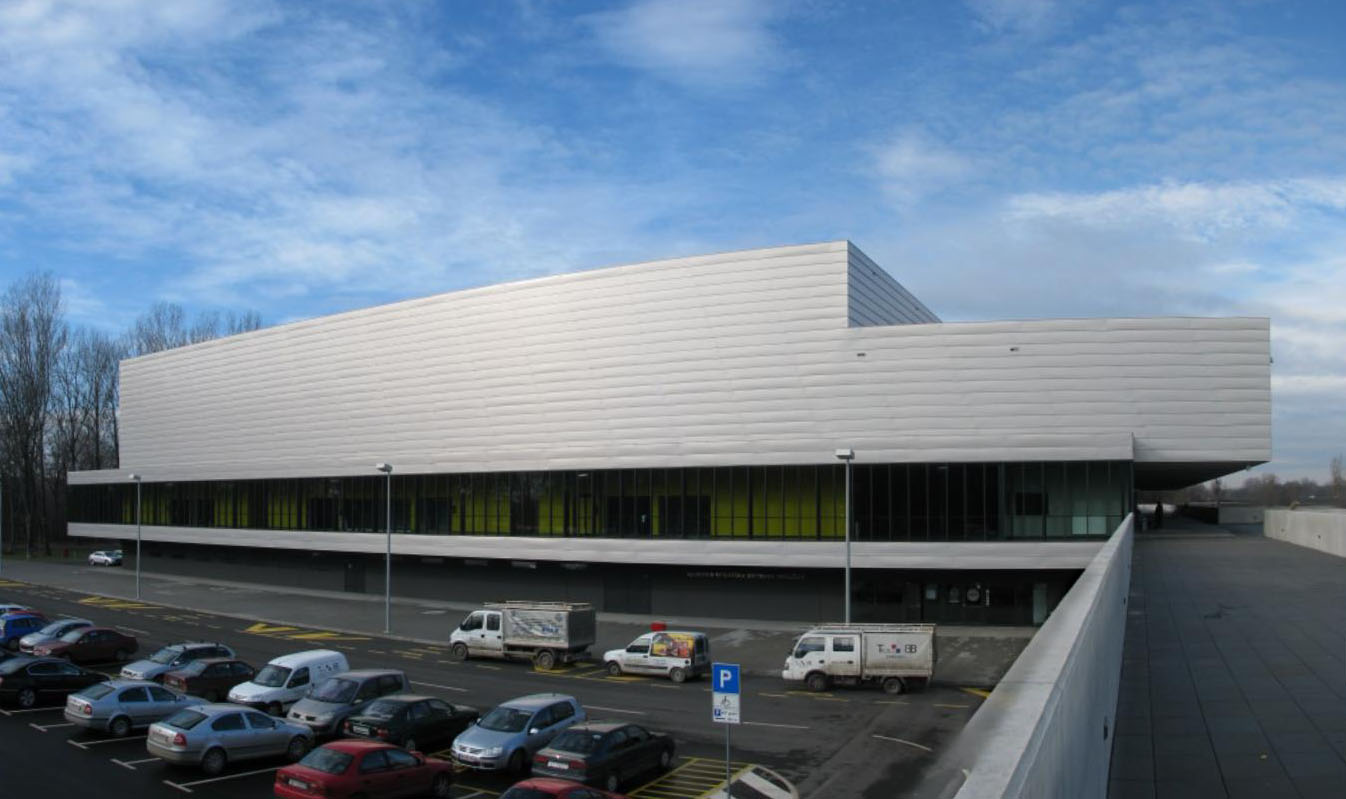
Varaždin Arena

== See also ==
- List of indoor arenas in Croatia
- List of indoor arenas in Europe
