= Ondřej Zdráhala =

Czech handball player

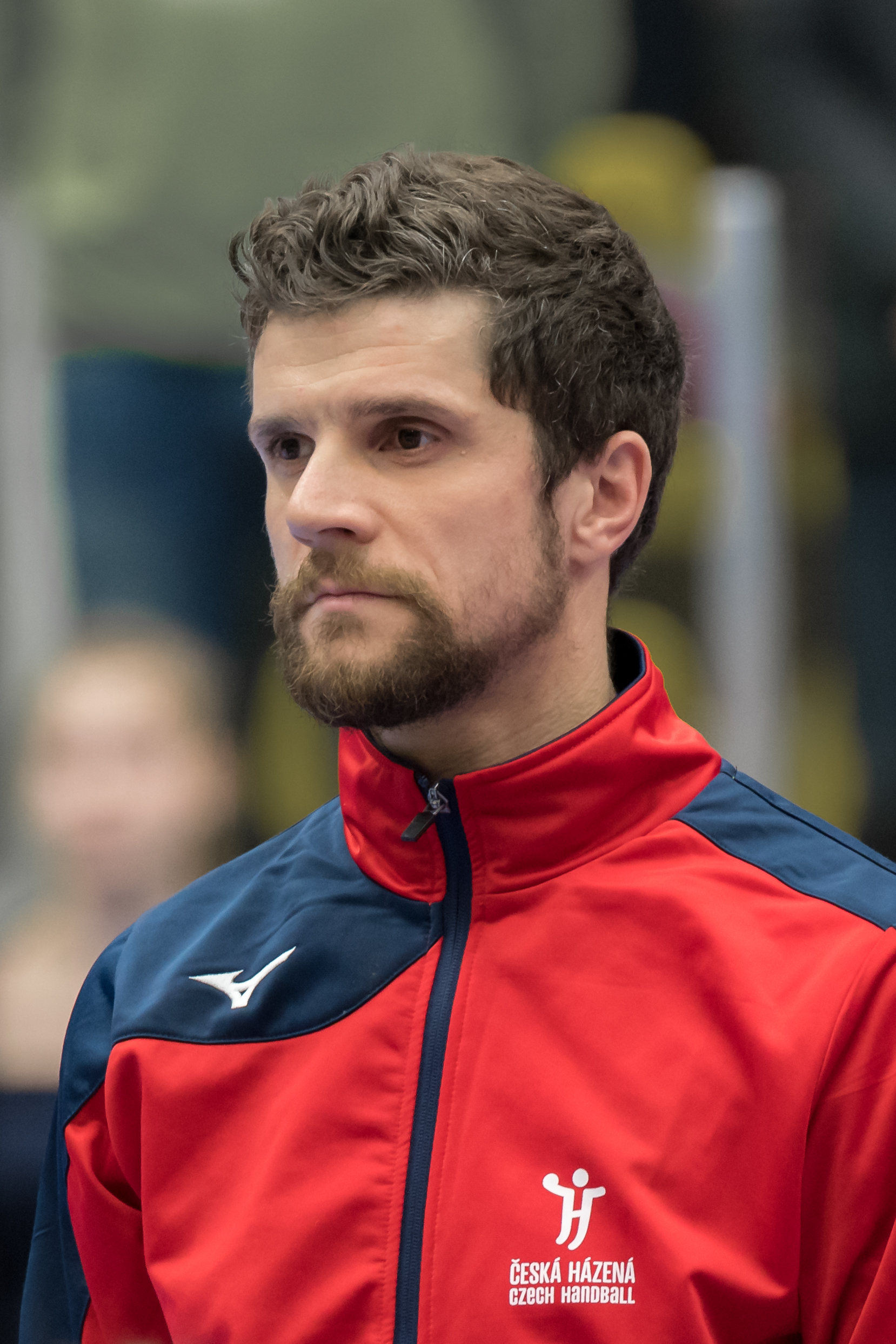

Personal information
- Nationality: Czech
- Born: 10 July 1983 (age 43) Ostrava, Czechoslovakia
- Height: 1.88 m (6 ft 2 in)

Sport
- Sport: Handball
- Position: Centre back
- Current club: Wisła Płock
- Number: 9

Senior clubs
- Years: Team
- –2002: SKP Frýdek-Místek
- 2002–2007: HC Baník Karviná
- 2007–2009: TV Großwallstadt
- 2009–2010: Bodø HK
- 2010–2011: TM Tønder
- 2011–2012: DHC Rheinland
- 2012–2013: MŠK Považská Bystrica
- 2013–2016: ASV Hamm-Westfalen
- 2016–2018: TSV St. Otmar St. Gallen
- 2018–2020: Wisła Płock
- 2020–2021: Al-Wakrah SC
National team
Years	Team	Apps	(Gls)
2003–2021	Czech Republic	124	(432)

Ondřej Zdráhala (born 10 July 1983) is a former Czech handball player for the Czech national team. He is the current president of the Czech Handball Association.

He participated at the 2015 World Men's Handball Championship in Qatar. He was the top goalscorer at the 2018 European Men's Handball Championship.
