= Martin Galia =

Czech handball player (born 1979)

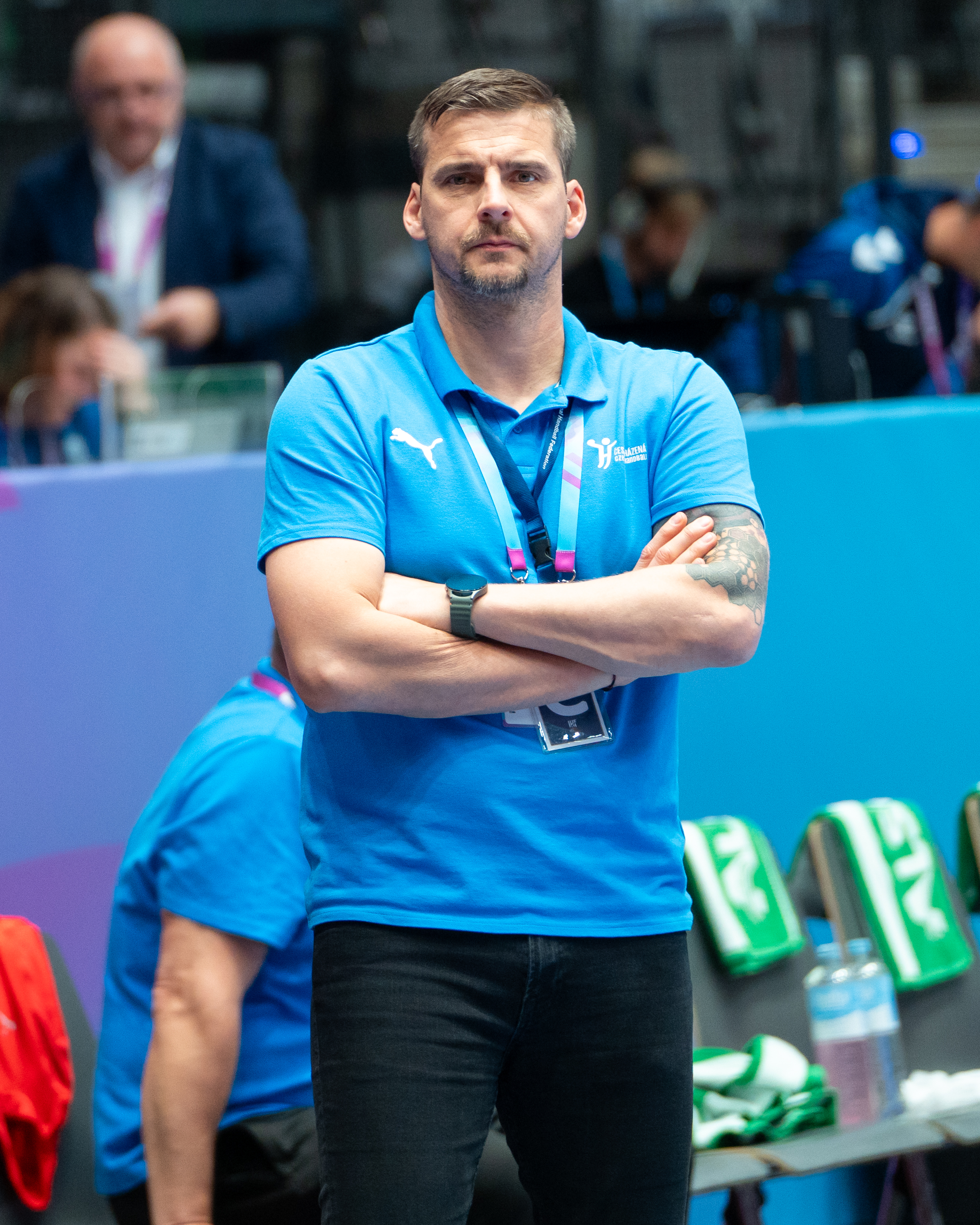

Personal information
- Nationality: Czech
- Born: 12 April 1979 (age 47) Karviná, Czechoslovakia
- Height: 1.89 m (6 ft 2 in)

Sport
- Sport: Handball
- Position: Goalkeeper
- Current club: HC Baník Karviná
- Number: 16

Senior clubs
- Years: Team
- 1997–2003: HC Baník Karviná
- 2003–2004: Redbergslids IK
- 2004–2008: Frisch Auf Göppingen
- 2008–2011: TBV Lemgo
- 2011–2013: TV Großwallstadt
- 2013–2016: TSV St. Otmar St. Gallen
- 2016–2022: NMC Górnik Zabrze
- 2022–2024: HC Baník Karviná
National team
Years	Team	Apps	(Gls)
2001–2021	Czech Republic	211	(8)

Teams managed
- 2021–: Czech Republic (goalkeeping coach)

Martin Galia (born 12 April 1979) is a Czech handball coach and former player and the Czech national team.

He participated at the 2015 World Men's Handball Championship.

On 28 March 2009 he was tested positive for Octopamine at a doping test in the German Bundesliga. He was banned for 6 month and fined 20,000€.
