= HCB Karviná =

Czech handball club

- Full name: Handball Club Baník Karviná, z.s.
- Founded: 1955; 71 years ago
- Arena: Házenkářská hala, Karviná
- Capacity: 2,200
- President: Michal Brůna
- Head coach: Michal Brůna
- League: Chance Extraliga
- Club colours
| Home | Away |

Handball Club Baník Karviná or HCB Karviná is a Czech professional handball club based in Karviná, Czech Republic. Baník Karviná is one of the most successful handball clubs in the country, having won the Chance Extraliga thirteen times.

Location of HCB Karviná

== History ==
The club was founded in 1952. HCB Karviná win the first title in 1968 in Czechoslovak second league and 1972 win in Czechoslovak first league. Club played in EHF Champions League in 2001, 2002, 2003, 2004, 2005, 2006, 2007, 2008 and EHF Cup in 1997, 1998, 1999, 2010, 2019 and 2020. The club has won the Czech Handball Extraliga twelve times, of which the last time was in 2022. The club competed in EHF Champions League and EHF Cup on several occasions.

== Crest, colours, supporters ==
=== Kit manufacturers ===
| Period | Kit manufacturer |
|---|---|
| – 2013 | (Germany) Kempa |
| 2013 – 2016 | (England) Umbro |
| 2016 – 2022 | (Germany) Kempa |
| 2022 – present | (Germany) Puma |

=== Kits ===
HOME
| 2013–14 | 2014–15 | 2015–16 | 2016–20 | 2020–22 | 2022-23 |

AWAY
| 2014–16 | 2017-18 | 2020-22 | 2022-23 |

== Management ==
| Position | Name |
|---|---|
| President | (Czech Republic) Michal Brůna |
| General Manager | (Czech Republic) Marek Michalisko |
| PR and Marketing Manager | (Czech Republic) Věra Murínová |
| Marketing Manager | (Czech Republic) Michal Králiček |
| Youth manager | (Czech Republic) Zdeněk Jelínek |

== Team ==
=== Current squad ===
Squad for the 2024–25 season

HCB Karviná

Goalkeepers

- 1 (Czech Republic) Petr Mokroš
- 22 (Czech Republic) Vojtěch Košťálek
- 66 (Czech Republic) Ondřej Mira

Left Wingers

- 31 (Czech Republic) Ondřej Skalický
- 33 (Czech Republic) Petr Široký

Right Wingers

- 27 (Czech Republic) Denis Harabiš (vrchní lízač prdelí)
- 74 (Czech Republic) Pavel Bajer

Line Players

- 23 (Czech Republic) Jan Užek
- 38 (Czech Republic) Matěj Nantl
- 96 (Czech Republic) Václav Franc

Central Backs

- 13 (Czech Republic) Vojtěch Prašivka
- 19 (Czech Republic) Jonáš Patzel
- 21 (Czech Republic) Patrik Fulnek

Left Backs

- 10 (Czech Republic) Václav Košťálek
- 15 (Czech Republic) Vojtěch Patzel
- 30 (Czech Republic) Dominik Solák
- 34 (Czech Republic) Daniel Křístek

Right Backs

- 7 (Ukraine) Illia Blyzniuk

=== Technical staff ===
- Head coach: (Czech Republic) Michal Brůna
- Fitness coach: (Czech Republic) Boris Aspridis
- Physiotherapist: (Czech Republic) Daniel Jaroš
- Masseur: (Czech Republic) David Hála
- Club doctor: (Czech Republic) Dr. Ľubomír Pacanovský

=== Transfers ===
Transfers for the 2026–27 season

Joining

Leaving

- (Ukraine) Illia Blyzniuk (RB) to (France) Saint-Raphaël Var Handball

=== Transfer History ===
Transfers for the 2024–25 season

Joining

- (Ukraine) Illia Blyzniuk (RB) from (Ukraine) HC Motor Zaporizhzhia
- (Poland) Maksymilian Surdyk (RB) from (Poland) Górnik Zabrze
- (Czech Republic) Vojtěch Patzel (LB) from (Germany) VfL Lübeck-Schwartau
- (Czech Republic) Daniel Křístek (LB) from (Czech Republic) HC Dukla Prague
- (Czech Republic) Pavel Bajer (RW) from (Czech Republic) HC Zubří

Leaving

- (Serbia) Dušan Živanov (RB) to (Bosnia and Herzegovina) RK Konjuh
- (Czech Republic) Jan Plaček (RW) to (Czech Republic) MHK Karviná
- (Czech Republic) Adam Ptáčník (LB) to (Czech Republic) SKKP Handball Brno
- (Czech Republic) David Růža (CB) to (Czech Republic) SHC Maloměřice Brno
- (Czech Republic) Ondřej Pavlík (LP)
- (Czech Republic) Matěj Brychlec (GK) on loan at (Czech Republic) KH Kopřivnice
- (Poland) Maksymilian Surdyk (RB) on loan at (Czech Republic) SKP Frýdek-Místek

Transfers for the 2023–24 season

Joining

- (Serbia) Dušan Živanov (RB) from (Czech Republic) SKKP Handball Brno
- (Czech Republic) Václav Košťálek (LB) from (Czech Republic) SKH Polanka
- (Czech Republic) Ondřej Pavlík (LP) from (Czech Republic) SKH Polanka

Leaving

- (Czech Republic) Michal Folwarczný (LW) to (Czech Republic) TJ Cement Hranice
- (Czech Republic) Šimon Klus (CB) to (Czech Republic) TJ Cement Hranice
- (Czech Republic) Matěj Pelák (LB) to (Czech Republic) TJ Cement Hranice
- (Czech Republic) Zdenek Čadra (RB) to (Czech Republic) KH Kopřivnice
- (Czech Republic) Šimon Siročák (CB) to (Czech Republic) SKH Polanka

Transfers for the 2022–23 season

Joining

- (Czech Republic) Martin Galia (GK) from (Poland) Górnik Zabrze
- (Czech Republic) Adam Ptáčník (LB) from (Czech Republic) TJ Sokol Nové Veselí
- (Czech Republic) Jonáš Patzel (CB) from (Germany) HSG Nordhorn-Lingen
- (Czech Republic) Zdenek Čadra (RB) from (Czech Republic) KH Kopřivnice
- (Czech Republic) Jan Plaček (RW) from (Czech Republic) TJ Cement Hranice

Leaving

- (Czech Republic) Jan Sobol (RW) (retires)
- (Serbia) Nemanja Marjanović (GK) to (Serbia) RK Dinamo Pančevo
- (Czech Republic) Jiří Tabara (GK) to (Czech Republic) MHK Karviná
- (Czech Republic) Vojtěch Patzel (CB) to (Germany) VfL Lübeck-Schwartau
- (Czech Republic) Slavomír Mlotek (CB) to (Czech Republic) SKP Frýdek-Místek
- (Czech Republic) Kristián Galia (LP) to (Czech Republic) HC ROBE Zubří
- (Poland) Artur Urbański (RB)

Transfers for the 2021–22 season

Joining

- (Czech Republic) Jan Sobol (RW) from (France) Dijon Métropole Handball
- (Czech Republic) Patrik Fulnek (CB) from (Czech Republic) KH Kopřivnice
- (Czech Republic) Denis Harabiš (RW) from (Czech Republic) HC Dukla Prague

Leaving

- (Czech Republic) Jakub Flajsar (CB) to (Czech Republic) TJ Sokol Nové Veselí
- (Czech Republic) Miroslav Nedoma (RW) to (Germany) Mecklenburger Stiere Schwerin
- (Czech Republic) Jan Plaček (RW) to (Czech Republic) TJ Cement Hranice
- (Belarus) Yury Gromyko (LP)

Transfers for the 2020–21 season

Joining

- (Czech Republic) Vojtěch Patzel (CB) from (Czech Republic) HC Dukla Prague
- (Czech Republic) Slavomír Mlotek (CB) from (Germany) Dessau-Roßlauer HV
- (Czech Republic) Jakub Flajsar (CB) from (Czech Republic) TJ Sokol Nové Veselí

Leaving

- (Czech Republic) Roman Chosik (LB) (retires)
- (Czech Republic) Marek Monczka (LB) to (Poland) Stal Mielec
- (Czech Republic) Jan Zbránek (LW) to (Czech Republic) TJ Cement Hranice
- (Czech Republic) Radim Chudoba (LB) to (Czech Republic) SKP Frýdek-Místek

Transfers for the 2019–20 season

Joining

- (Poland) Artur Urbański (RB) from (Poland) Piotrkowianin Piotrków Trybunalski
- (Belarus) Yury Gromyko (LP) from (Poland) Górnik Zabrze
- (Czech Republic) Ondřej Skalický (LW) from (Czech Republic) TJ Sokol Nové Veselí
- (Czech Republic) Václav Franc (LP) from (Czech Republic) HK Lovosice

Leaving

- (Poland) Tymoteusz Piątek (LP) to (Switzerland) HS Biel
- (Czech Republic) Jan Mucha (LB) to (Czech Republic) TJ Cement Hranice

Transfers for the 2018–19 season

Joining

- (Czech Republic) Radim Chudoba (LB) from (Slovakia) MŠK Považská Bystrica
- (Serbia) Ivan Stojanovič (LB) from (Bosnia and Herzegovina) RK Vogošća

Leaving

- (Czech Republic) Tomáš Mlotek (LB) to (Czech Republic) TJ Cement Hranice
- (Czech Republic) Slavomír Mlotek (CB) to (Germany) Dessau-Roßlauer HV

Transfers for the 2017–18 season

Joining

- (Serbia) Nemanja Marjanović (GK) from (France) Sarrebourg Moselle-Sud Handball
- (Czech Republic) Michal Brůna (LB) from (Poland) Pogoń Szczecin
- (Poland) Tymoteusz Piątek (LP) from (Poland) Górnik Zabrze
- (Czech Republic) Matěj Nantl (LB) from (Czech Republic) Tatran Litovel
- (Czech Republic) Jan Zbránek (LW) from (Czech Republic) Tatran Litovel

Leaving

- (Czech Republic) Lukáš Frančík (LW) to (Poland) Górnik Zabrze
- (Poland) Przemysław Witkowski (GK) to (Poland) Górnik Zabrze
- (Czech Republic) Libor Hanisch (LP) to (Germany) Dessau-Roßlauer HV

== Previous squads ==
2021–2022 Team
| Shirt No | Nationality | Player | Birth Date | Position |
|---|---|---|---|---|
| 1 | Czech Republic | Petr Mokroš | 8 August 1997 (age 29) | Goalkeeper |
| 6 | Czech Republic | Miroslav Halama | 5 April 2001 (age 25) | Right Winger |
| 7 | Poland | Artur Urbański | 28 June 1998 (age 28) | Right Back |
| 11 | Czech Republic | Nicolas Noworyta | 21 October 2000 (age 25) | Line Player |
| 15 | Czech Republic | Vojtěch Patzel | 23 September 1998 (age 27) | Central Back |
| 16 | Serbia | Nemanja Marjanović | 8 January 1984 (age 42) | Goalkeeper |
| 20 | Czech Republic | Slavomír Mlotek | 19 June 1992 (age 34) | Central Back |
| 21 | Czech Republic | Patrik Fulnek | 23 May 1995 (age 31) | Central Back |
| 23 | Czech Republic | Jan Užek | 11 October 1993 (age 32) | Line Player |
| 24 | Czech Republic | Matěj Pelák | 5 February 2003 (age 23) | Left Back |
| 26 | Czech Republic | Jiří Tabara | 10 November 1993 (age 32) | Goalkeeper |
| 27 | Czech Republic | Denis Harabiš | 26 May 1999 (age 27) | Right Winger |
| 30 | Czech Republic | Dominik Solák | 17 August 1997 (age 29) | Left Back |
| 31 | Czech Republic | Ondřej Skalický | 19 November 1998 (age 27) | Left Winger |
| 32 | Serbia | Kosta Petrović | 6 March 1995 (age 31) | Line Player |
| 33 | Czech Republic | Petr Široký | 8 December 2002 (age 23) | Left Winger |
| 38 | Czech Republic | Matěj Nantl | 15 July 1998 (age 28) | Left Back |
| 44 | Czech Republic | Jan Sobol | 22 May 1984 (age 42) | Right Winger |
| 69 | Czech Republic | Kristián Galia | 10 January 2003 (age 23) | Line Player |
| 77 | Czech Republic | David Růža | 2 May 2000 (age 26) | Central Back |
| 96 | Czech Republic | Václav Franc | 10 August 1996 (age 30) | Line Player |

2017–2018 Team
| Shirt No | Nationality | Player | Birth Date | Position |
|---|---|---|---|---|
| 1 | Czech Republic | Petr Mokroš | 8 August 1997 (age 29) | Goalkeeper |
| 2 | Czech Republic | Michal Vaněk | 9 April 1999 (age 27) | Right Winger |
| 3 | Czech Republic | Michal Brůna | 28 January 1978 (age 48) | Central Back |
| 4 | Czech Republic | Jaroslav Fulneček | 14 September 1998 (age 28) | Line Player |
| 5 | Czech Republic | Marek Monczka | 16 March 1990 (age 36) | Left Back |
| 7 | Czech Republic | Jan Pindej | 6 August 1991 (age 35) | Line Player |
| 8 | Czech Republic | Jakub Kraina | 27 March 1999 (age 27) | Left Winger |
| 10 | Poland | Tymoteusz Piątek | 12 April 1994 (age 32) | Line Player |
| 12 | Czech Republic | Jan Juráš | 6 July 1998 (age 28) | Goalkeeper |
| 13 | Czech Republic | Jan Plaček | 4 August 1997 (age 29) | Right Winger |
| 16 | Serbia | Nemanja Marjanović | 8 January 1984 (age 42) | Goalkeeper |
| 18 | Czech Republic | Marek Drzyzga | 3 January 1996 (age 30) | Left Winger |
| 19 | Czech Republic | Adam Wozniak | 1 February 1997 (age 29) | Line Player |
| 20 | Czech Republic | Slavomír Mlotek | 19 June 1992 (age 34) | Central Back |
| 23 | Czech Republic | Jan Užek | 11 October 1993 (age 32) | Line Player |
| 24 | Czech Republic | Dominik Solák | 17 August 1997 (age 29) | Left Back |
| 26 | Czech Republic | Jiří Tabara | 10 November 1993 (age 32) | Goalkeeper |
| 31 | Czech Republic | Tomáš Mlotek | 7 March 1994 (age 32) | Left Back |
| 38 | Czech Republic | Matěj Nantl | 15 July 1998 (age 28) | Left Back |
| 62 | Czech Republic | Jan Zbránek | 13 November 1990 (age 35) | Left Winger |
| 66 | Czech Republic | Miroslav Nedoma | 10 November 1993 (age 32) | Right Winger |
| 88 | Czech Republic | Jiří Užek | 9 December 1994 (age 31) | Left Back |

2006–2007 Team
| Shirt No | Nationality | Player | Birth Date | Position |
|---|---|---|---|---|
| 1 | Czech Republic | Tomáš Mrkva | 20 January 1989 (age 37) | Goalkeeper |
| 2 | Czech Republic | Tomas Bednarik | 23 September 1982 (age 43) | Line Player |
| 3 | Czech Republic | Robert Plšek | 23 March 1984 (age 42) | Left Back |
| 5 | Czech Republic | Kamil Heinz | 18 April 1975 (age 51) | Right Back |
| 11 | Ukraine | Andriy Kuzo | 21 March 1979 (age 47) | Right Back |
| 14 | Czech Republic | Tomáš Heinz | 19 March 1977 (age 49) | Left Winger |
| 16 | Serbia | Nemanja Marjanović | 8 January 1984 (age 42) | Goalkeeper |
| 17 | Serbia | Veljko Inđić | 6 April 1984 (age 42) | Line Player |
| 18 | Czech Republic | Ondřej Zdráhala | 10 July 1983 (age 43) | Central Back |
| 19 | Czech Republic | Jan Sobol | 22 May 1984 (age 42) | Right Winger |
| 20 | Czech Republic | Ondřej Šulc | 21 November 1983 (age 42) | Right Back |
| 22 | Czech Republic | Rostislav Brůna | 27 March 1984 (age 42) | Left Back |
| 23 | Czech Republic | Michal Mrozek | 26 March 1984 (age 42) | Left Winger |
| 24 | Czech Republic | Radek Kružík | 19 January 1988 (age 38) | Left Back |
| 25 | Czech Republic | Radek Bajgar | 26 January 1986 (age 40) | Central Back |
| 27 | Czech Republic | Jan Szymon | 14 August 1984 (age 42) | Left Winger |
| 28 | Czech Republic | Josef Pour | 7 March 1985 (age 41) | Goalkeeper |
| 29 | Czech Republic | Jiří Kubis | 20 April 1985 (age 41) | Right Winger |
| 30 | Czech Republic | Jaroslav Dyba | 5 January 1987 (age 39) | Left Back |
| 32 | Czech Republic | Roman Požárek | 23 September 1985 (age 40) | Line Player |
| 33 | Czech Republic | Rostislav Baďura | 3 March 1975 (age 51) | Goalkeeper |
| 69 | Slovakia | Julius Kornan | 5 September 1979 (age 47) | Central Back |
| 86 | Czech Republic | Miroslav Rachač | 7 August 1986 (age 40) | Left Back |

2001–2002 Team
| Shirt No | Nationality | Player | Birth Date | Position |
|---|---|---|---|---|
| 1 | Czech Republic | Benjamin Liszok | 15 April 1980 (age 46) | Goalkeeper |
| 2 | Czech Republic | Tomas Bednarik | 23 September 1982 (age 43) | Line Player |
| 3 | Czech Republic | Michal Brůna | 28 January 1978 (age 48) | Central Back |
| 4 | Czech Republic | Roman Konečný | 18 January 1974 (age 52) | Left Winger |
| 5 | Czech Republic | Kamil Heinz | 18 April 1975 (age 51) | Right Back |
| 6 | Czech Republic | Pavel Prokopec | 10 January 1980 (age 46) | Left Back |
| 7 | Czech Republic | Andrej Titkov | 15 March 1969 (age 57) | Line Player |
| 8 | Czech Republic | Pavel Horák | 28 November 1982 (age 43) | Left Back |
| 9 | Czech Republic | Tomáš Laclavik | 1 April 1980 (age 46) | Left Winger |
| 10 | Czech Republic | Roman Farář | 28 October 1973 (age 52) | Line Player |
| 11 | Czech Republic | Luděk Drobek | 23 December 1975 (age 50) | Right Back |
| 12 | Czech Republic | Miloš Slabý | 1 March 1972 (age 54) | Goalkeeper |
| 13 | Czech Republic | René Vasek | 30 January 1970 (age 56) | Right Winger |
| 14 | Czech Republic | Tomáš Heinz | 19 March 1977 (age 49) | Left Winger |
| 15 | Czech Republic | Alexander Radčenko | 5 July 1973 (age 53) | Central Back |
| 16 | Czech Republic | Martin Galia | 12 April 1979 (age 47) | Goalkeeper |
| 17 | Czech Republic | David Juříček | 8 August 1974 (age 52) | Line Player |
| 18 | Czech Republic | Martin Toms | 4 May 1980 (age 46) | Right Winger |
| 19 | Czech Republic | Jan Sobol | 22 May 1984 (age 42) | Right Winger |
| 20 | Czech Republic | Jakub Szymanski | 9 February 1983 (age 43) | Central Back |
| 21 | Czech Republic | Radek Krzyzecki | 4 December 1982 (age 43) | Goalkeeper |

== Accomplishments ==
- Czech Handball Extraliga:
  - Gold (13): 2000, 2001, 2002, 2004, 2005, 2006, 2007, 2008, 2009, 2010, 2018, 2022, 2024
  - Silver (4): 1997, 1998, 2019, 2023
  - Bronze (3): 1994, 1996, 2012
- Czechoslovakia Handball League:
  - Gold (2): 1968, 1972,
  - Silver (4): 1967, 1987, 1990, 1992,
  - Bronze (5): 1969, 1974, 1976, 1988, 1991,

== European record ==
| Season | Competition | Round | Club | Home | Away | Aggregate |
|---|---|---|---|---|---|---|
| 1972–73 | EHF Champions League | R1 | (Portugal) Sporting Lisbon | 24–11 | 16–15 | 40–26 |
| 1972–73 | EHF Champions League | R2 | (Socialist Federal Republic of Yugoslavia) and now (Croatia) Partizan Bjelovar | 16–10 | 13–22 | 29–32 |
| 1996–97 | EHF Cup | 1/16 | (Israel) HC Nes Ziona | 31–19 | 26–20 | 57–39 |
| 1996–97 | EHF Cup | 1/8 | (Germany) SG Flensburg-Handewitt | 21–21 | 18–26 | 39–47 |
| 1997–98 | EHF Cup | 1/16 | (Greece) A.C Xini Athens | 33–19 | 31–24 | 64–43 |
| 1997–98 | EHF Cup | 1/8 | (Norway) Sandefjord TIF | 24–19 | 21–26 | 45–45 |
| 1997–98 | EHF Cup | 1/4 | (Russia) CSKA Moscow | 29–23 | 20–30 | 49–53 |
| 1998–99 | EHF Cup | 1/16 | (Luxembourg) HB Dudelange | 32–18 | 22–15 | 54–33 |
| 1998–99 | EHF Cup | 1/8 | (Ukraine) Schachtroj Donetsk | 26–24 | 21–21 | 47–45 |
| 1998–99 | EHF Cup | 1/4 | (Spain) CBM de Valladolid | 24–34 | 37–34 | 61–68 |
| 2000–01 | EHF Champions League | R2 | (Romania) Steaua Bucuresti | 29–18 | 34–29 | 63–47 |
| 2000–01 | EHF Champions League | Group D | (Spain) Portland San Antonio | 30–33 | 25–35 | 4rd |
| 2000–01 | EHF Champions League | Group D | (Norway) IL Runar Sandefjord | 34–26 | 25–27 | 4rd |
| 2000–01 | EHF Champions League | Group D | (Socialist Federal Republic of Yugoslavia) and now (Montenegro) Lovcen Centinje | 29–29 | 27–31 | 4rd |
| 2001–02 | EHF Champions League | R1 | (Lithuania) Granitas Kaunas | 32–20 | 23–20 | 55–40 |
| 2001–02 | EHF Champions League | R2 | (Switzerland) TSV St. Otmar St. Gallen | 38–27 | 36–25 | 74–52 |
| 2001–02 | EHF Champions League | Group C | (Spain) C.BM. Ademar Leon | 29–27 | 25–31 | 3rd |
| 2001–02 | EHF Champions League | Group C | (Slovenia) Celje Pivovarna Lasko | 31–32 | 21–31 | 3rd |
| 2001–02 | EHF Champions League | Group C | (Russia) CSKA Moscow | 33–25 | 31–32 | 3rd |
| 2002–03 | EHF Champions League | R2 | (Slovakia) MSK Povazská Bystrica | 31–25 | 36–22 | 67–47 |
| 2002–03 | EHF Champions League | Group C | (Slovenia) Prule 67 Ljubljana | 29–36 | 34–27 | 4rd |
| 2002–03 | EHF Champions League | Group C | (France) Montpellier HB | 23–26 | 30–32 | 4rd |
| 2002–03 | EHF Champions League | Group C | (Russia) Chehovski Medvedi | 35–27 | 23–40 | 4rd |
| 2003–04 | EHF Champions League | Group H | (Croatia) RK Metkovic | 38–27 | 25–28 | 3rd |
| 2003–04 | EHF Champions League | Group H | (France) Chambery Savoie HB | 28–36 | 26–34 | 3rd |
| 2003–04 | EHF Champions League | Group H | (Switzerland) Pfadi Winterthur | 34–31 | 29–38 | 3rd |
| 2004–05 | EHF Champions League | Group H | (Croatia) RK Metkovic | 30–25 | 24–24 | 3rd |
| 2004–05 | EHF Champions League | Group H | (Germany) SG Flensburg-Handewitt | 27–39 | 24–32 | 3rd |
| 2004–05 | EHF Champions League | Group H | (Slovakia) Tatran Prešov | 29–32 | 25–22 | 3rd |
| 2005–06 | EHF Champions League | Group H | (Germany) SG Flensburg-Handewitt | 22–28 | 28–35 | 3rd |
| 2005–06 | EHF Champions League | Group H | (France) Paris Handball | 26–26 | 18–21 | 3rd |
| 2005–06 | EHF Champions League | Group H | (Lithuania) HC Granitas Kaunas | 31–26 | 35–28 | 3rd |
| 2006–07 | EHF Champions League | Group E | (Romania) CS HCM Constanta | 31–34 | 29–29 | 4rd |
| 2006–07 | EHF Champions League | Group E | (Germany) THW Kiel | 26–50 | 25–44 | 4rd |
| 2006–07 | EHF Champions League | Group E | (Denmark) GOG Svenborg TGI Gudme | 32–37 | 32–45 | 4rd |
| 2007–08 | EHF Champions League | Group A | (Spain) FC Barcelona | 20–35 | 25–43 | 4rd |
| 2007–08 | EHF Champions League | Group A | (France) US Ivry Handball | 26–27 | 22–32 | 4rd |
| 2007–08 | EHF Champions League | Group A | (Russia) Zarja Kaspija Astrakhan | 22–22 | 25–32 | 4rd |
| 2009–10 | EHF Cup | R1 | (Luxembourg) HB Dudelange | 32–21 | 27–24 | 59–45 |
| 2009–10 | EHF Cup | R2 | (Romania) UCM Sport Resita | 29–28 | 32–40 | 61–68 |
| 2010–11 | EHF Cup Winners' Cup | R3 | (Slovenia) RK Maribor Branik | 28–33 | 22–28 | 50–61 |
| 2011–12 | EHF Cup Winners' Cup | R3 | (Germany) SG Flensburg-Handewitt | 23–37 | 18–37 | 41–74 |
| 2018–19 | EHF Cup | R2 | (North Macedonia) HC Prolet 62 | 26–22 | 32–25 | 58–47 |
| 2018–19 | EHF Cup | R3 | (Hungary) Balatonfüredi KSE | 33–34 | 29–32 | 62–66 |
| 2019–20 | EHF Challenge Cup | R2 | (Israel) Holon Yuvalim HC | 31–26 | 32–29 | 63–55 |
| 2019–20 | EHF Challenge Cup | R3 | (Serbia) RK Železničar 1949 | 33–28 | 28–30 | 61–58 |
| 2019–20 | EHF Challenge Cup | L16 | (Portugal) Madeira Andebol SAD | 33–27 | 27–30 | 60–57 |
| 2019–20 | EHF Challenge Cup | QF | (Czech Republic) HC Dukla Prague | — | — | Cancelled |
| 2020–21 | EHF European Cup | R2 | (Austria) SC kelag Ferlach | — | — | Cancelled |
| 2021–22 | EHF European Cup | R2 | (Turkey) İzmir BSB SK | 32–26 | 32–25 | 64–51 |
| 2021–22 | EHF European Cup | R3 | (Cyprus) Sabbianco A. Famagusta | 33–22 | 29–24 | 62–46 |
| 2021–22 | EHF European Cup | L16 | (Switzerland) HSC Suhr Aarau | 23–27 | 28–30 | 51–57 |
| 2022–23 | EHF European Cup | R2 | (Kosovo) Rahoveci | 32–29 | 33–29 | 65–58 |
| 2022–23 | EHF European Cup | R3 | (Bosnia and Herzegovina) Gračanica | 22–18 | 33–27 | 55–45 |
| 2022–23 | EHF European Cup | L16 | (Serbia) Dinamo Pančevo | 30–22 | 26–31 | 56–53 |
| 2022–23 | EHF European Cup | QF | (Norway) Runar Sandefjord | 31–34 | 25–28 | 56–62 |
| 2023–24 | EHF European Cup | R2 | (Austria) Fivers | 32–26 | 32–36 | 64–62 |
| 2023–24 | EHF European Cup | R3 | (Bosnia and Herzegovina) RK Leotar | 28–21 | 28–27 | 56–48 |
| 2023–24 | EHF European Cup | L16 | (Romania) CSA Steaua București | 29–29 | 27–28 | 56–57 |
| 2024–25 | EHF European League | QR | (Bosnia and Herzegovina) RK Izviđač | 33–22 | 26–32 | 59–54 |
| 2024–25 | EHF European League | Group G | (Hungary) MOL-Tatabánya KC | 31–31 | 27–28 | 3rd |
| 2024–25 | EHF European League | Group G | (Germany) SG Flensburg-Handewitt | 31–41 | 33–36 | 3rd |
| 2024–25 | EHF European League | Group G | (Croatia) MRK Sesvete | 32–29 | 23–38 | 3rd |
| 2025–26 | EHF European League | QR | (Serbia) RK Partizan | 26–30 | 27–31 | 53–61 |
| 2025–26 | EHF European Cup | R2 | (Serbia) RK Dinamo Pančevo | 33–25 | 27–29 | 60–54 |
| 2025–26 | EHF European Cup | R3 | (Austria) Handball Tirol | 43–25 | 33–40 | 76–65 |
| 2025–26 | EHF European Cup | L16 | (Hungary) Balatonfüredi KSE | 30–28 | 28–27 | 58–55 |
| 2025–26 | EHF European Cup | QF | (Bosnia and Herzegovina) RK Izviđač | 34–29 | 31–36 | 65–65 (6–7 p) |

== EHF ranking ==
As of 26/9/2024

| Rank | Team | Points |
|---|---|---|
| 41 | (Ukraine) HC Motor Zaporizhzhia | 109 |
| 42 | (Slovakia) HT Tatran Prešov | 108 |
| 43 | (Germany) Frisch Auf Göppingen | 108 |
| 44 | (Czech Republic) HCB Karviná | 108 |
| 45 | (Turkey) Beşiktaş JK | 97 |
| 46 | (Sweden) Ystads IF | 97 |
| 47 | (Hungary) MOL Tatabánya KC | 91 |

== Former club members ==
=== Notable former players ===
==== Goalkeepers ====
- (Czech Republic) Rostislav Baďura (1991–1992, 2004–2006)
- (Czech Republic) Martin Galia (1997–2003, 2022–2024)
- (Czech Republic) Tomáš Mrkva (2006–2010)
- (Czech Republic) Miloš Slabý (2000–2004)
- (Serbia) Nemanja Marjanović (2005–2008, 2017–2022)
- (Slovakia) Miloš Putera (2004–2006)

==== Right wingers ====
- (Czech Republic) Denis Harabiš (2021–)
- (Czech Republic) Jan Sobol (2001–2007, 2021–2022)
- (Slovakia) Jan Faith (2007–2011)

==== Left wingers ====
- (Czech Republic) Tomáš Heinz (1994–2012)
- (Czech Republic) Tomáš Laclavik (1997–2005)
- (Czech Republic) Marek Vančo (2009–2016)

==== Line players ====
- (Czech Republic) Roman Farár (1991–2003, 2008–2011)
- (Czech Republic) Václav Franc (2019–)
- (Czech Republic) David Juříček (1992–2003)
- (Czech Republic) Arnošt Klimčík (1964–1977)
- (Czech Republic) Martin Prachař (1997–2006)
- (Czech Republic) Pavel Stefan (1991–1998)
- (Czech Republic) Jan Užek (2011–)
- (Belarus) Yuri Gromyko (2019–2021)
- (Serbia) Veljko Inđić (2006–2008)

==== Left backs ====
- (Czech Republic) Michal Brůna (2000–2002, 2003–2004, 2017–2020)
- (Czech Republic) Pavel Horák (1996–2006)
- (Czech Republic) Václav Lanča (1984–1991, 1997–1999)
- (Czech Republic) Vojtěch Patzel (2020–2022, 2024–)
- (Czech Republic) Pavel Prokopec (2000–2004)
- (Czech Republic) Dominik Solák (2015–)
- (Slovakia) Martin Farkasovský (2007–2008)

==== Central backs ====
- (Czech Republic) Richard Hladký (1994–1996)
- (Czech Republic) Alexander Radčenko (1999–2003)
- (Czech Republic) Jakub Szymanski (2001–2006)
- (Czech Republic) Ondřej Zdráhala (2002–2007)
- (Poland) Krzysztof Łyżwa (2009–2011)

==== Right backs ====
- (Czech Republic) František Brůna (1961–1976)
- (Czech Republic) Luděk Drobek (1993–2004)
- (Czech Republic) Kamil Heinz (1994–2006)
- (Czech Republic) Ondřej Šulc (2006–2010)
- (Slovakia) Pavol Polakovic (2000–2002)
