= Pavel Horák (handballer) =

Czech handball player

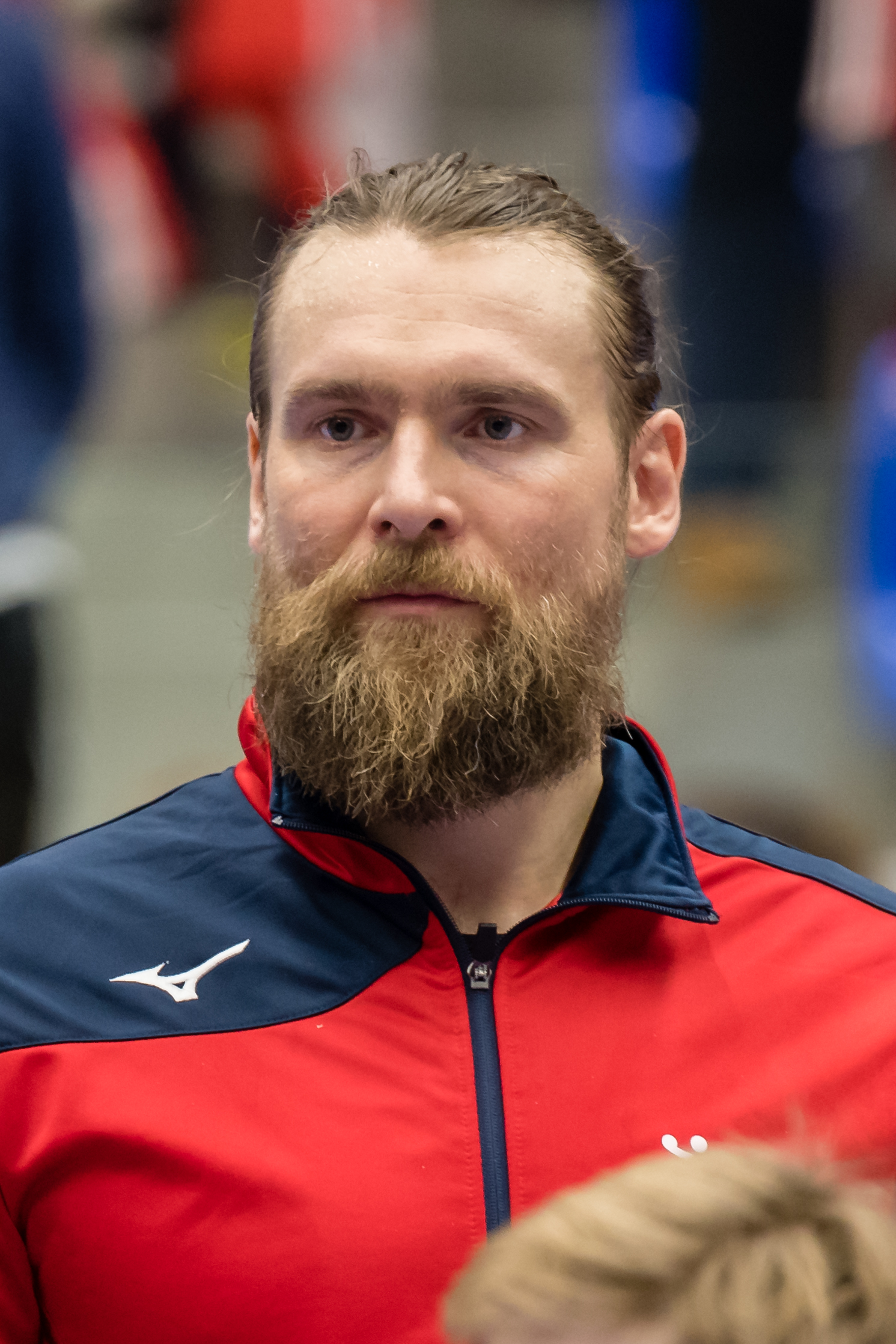
- Horák with the Czech Republic in 2018

Personal information
- Nationality: Czech
- Born: 28 November 1982 (age 43) Přerov, Czechoslovakia
- Height: 1.98 m (6 ft 6 in)

Sport
- Sport: Handball
- Position: Left back
- Current club: HK Lovosice

Youth career
- Years: Team
- 1991–1996: HC Přerov
- 1996–2001: Baník Karviná

Senior clubs
- Years: Team
- 2001–2006: Baník Karviná
- 2006–2007: Ahlener SG
- 2007–2013: Frisch Auf Göppingen
- 2013–2015: Füchse Berlin
- 2015–2017: HC Erlangen
- 2017–2019: Meshkov Brest
- 2019–2022: THW Kiel
- 2022–: HK Lovosice
National team
Years	Team	Apps	(Gls)
2004-	Czech Republic	130	(352)
Title
- 2011: EHF Cup
- Updated on 1 July 2022

Pavel Horák (born 28 November 1982) is a Czech handballer for HK Lovosice and the Czech national team.
