= Jakub Szymański (footballer, born 2000) =

Polish footballer

Personal information
- Date of birth: 30 August 2000 (age 26)
- Place of birth: Jastrzębie-Zdrój, Poland
- Height: 1.90 m (6 ft 3 in)
- Position: Goalkeeper

Youth career
- –2015: MOSiR Jastrzębie Zdrój
- 2015–2016: Górnik Zabrze

Senior career*
Years	Team	Apps	(Gls)
2016–2019	Górnik Zabrze II	19	(0)
2018–2019	Górnik Zabrze	0	(0)
2020–2021	MKS Kluczbork	16	(0)
2020–2022	Górnik Polkowice	51	(0)
2022–2023	Siarka Tarnobrzeg	2	(0)
2023–2024	Widzew Łódź	0	(0)
2024–2026	Ruch Chorzów	6	(0)
- * Club domestic league appearances and goals as of 14:49, 29 May 2026 (UTC)

Jakub Szymański (born 30 August 2000) is a Polish professional footballer who plays as a goalkeeper.

Szymański signed for Ruch at the end of the season in May 2024, their first signing for the new season at the time. He transferred from Widzew Łódź where he failed to break into the first team squad and made only two Polish Cup appearances. He was released by Ruch at the end of the 2025–26 season.

== Honours ==
Górnik Polkowice

- II liga: 2020–21
