= Czech Republic men's national handball team =

Czech Republic

Information
- Association: Czech Handball Association
- Coach: Ondřej Mika
- Assistant coach: Michal Brůna; Martin Galia; Daniel Kubeš
- Captain: Tomáš Mrkva
- Most caps: Jakub Hrstka
- Most goals: Jan Filip

Colours
| 1st | 2nd |

Results

World Championship
- Appearances: 7 (First in 1995)
- Best result: 8th (1995)

European Championship
- Appearances: 12 (First in 1996)
- Best result: 6th (1996, 2018)
- Last updated on Unknown.

The Czech Republic national handball team is the national handball team of the Czech Republic. It was most successful in the mid-1990s, with sixth place at the 1996 European Championship and a victory against the runner-up Croatia at the 1995 World Championship, but the team have failed to qualify for major championships on several occasions since.

Before the Czech Republic became independent in 1993, the Czechoslovakia national team won five World Championship medals between 1954 and 1967, and qualified for every World Championship between 1954 and 1993. However, the Czech federation were admitted in an attempt to qualify for the first European Championship in 1994. They were eliminated by another new country, Slovenia, after losing from the away goals rule.

== Results ==
=== World Championship ===
World Championship record
| Year | Round | Position | GP | W | D | L | GS | GA |
|---|---|---|---|---|---|---|---|---|
| (Iceland) 1995 | 7/8th place | 8 | 9 | 5 | 0 | 4 | 206 | 205 |
| (Japan) 1997 | Round of 16 | 11 | 6 | 3 | 0 | 3 | 138 | 125 |
| (Egypt) 1999 | did not qualify | | | | | | | |
| (France) 2001 | Preliminary round | 18 | 5 | 1 | 2 | 2 | 136 | 136 |
| (Portugal) 2003 | did not qualify | | | | | | | |
| (Tunisia) 2005 | 9/10th place | 10 | 9 | 3 | 2 | 4 | 261 | 271 |
| (Germany) 2007 | 11/12th place | 12 | 8 | 2 | 0 | 6 | 227 | 235 |
| (Croatia) 2009 | did not qualify | | | | | | | |
| (Sweden) 2011 | did not qualify | | | | | | | |
| (Spain) 2013 | did not qualify | | | | | | | |
| (Qatar) 2015 | 17/18th place | 17 | 7 | 3 | 1 | 3 | 209 | 199 |
| (France) 2017 | did not qualify | | | | | | | |
| (Denmark) / (Germany) 2019 | did not qualify | | | | | | | |
| (Egypt) 2021 | Withdrawn | | | | | | | |
| (Poland) / (Sweden) 2023 | did not qualify | | | | | | | |
| (Croatia) / (Denmark) / (Norway) 2025 | Main round | 19 | 6 | 1 | 2 | 3 | 130 | 144 |
| (Germany) 2027 | did not qualify | | | | | | | |
| (France) / (Germany) 2029 | To be determined | | | | | | | |
| (Denmark) / (Iceland) / (Norway) 2031 | To be determined | | | | | | | |
| Total | 7/17 | – | 50 | 18 | *7 | 25 | 1307 | 1315 |

*Denotes draws including knockout matches decided in a penalty shootout.

=== European Championship ===
European Championship record
| Year | Round | Position | GP | W | D | L | GS | GA |
|---|---|---|---|---|---|---|---|---|
| (Portugal) 1994 | did not qualify | | | | | | | |
| (Spain) 1996 | Preliminary Round | 6 | 6 | 3 | 0 | 3 | 154 | 152 |
| (Italy) 1998 | Preliminary Round | 10 | 6 | 1 | 0 | 5 | 166 | 170 |
| (Croatia) 2000 | did not qualify | | | | | | | |
| (Sweden) 2002 | Main Round | 8 | 7 | 3 | 0 | 4 | 180 | 205 |
| (Slovenia) 2004 | Main Round | 11 | 6 | 1 | 1 | 4 | 177 | 202 |
| (Switzerland) 2006 | did not qualify | | | | | | | |
| (Norway) 2008 | Preliminary Round | 13 | 3 | 0 | 0 | 3 | 88 | 97 |
| (Austria) 2010 | Main Round | 8 | 6 | 2 | 1 | 3 | 175 | 180 |
| (Serbia) 2012 | Preliminary Round | 14 | 3 | 1 | 0 | 2 | 77 | 84 |
| (Denmark) 2014 | Preliminary Round | 15 | 3 | 0 | 1 | 2 | 73 | 87 |
| (Poland) 2016 | did not qualify | | | | | | | |
| (Croatia) 2018 | Fifth place match | 6 | 7 | 3 | 1 | 3 | 173 | 186 |
| (Austria) (Norway) (Sweden) 2020 | Main Round | 12 | 7 | 2 | 0 | 5 | 172 | 183 |
| (Hungary) (Slovakia) 2022 | Preliminary Round | 13 | 3 | 1 | 1 | 1 | 80 | 74 |
| (Germany) 2024 | Preliminary Round | 15 | 3 | 1 | 0 | 2 | 70 | 73 |
| (Denmark) (Norway) (Sweden) 2026 | Preliminary Round | 17 | 3 | 1 | 0 | 2 | 91 | 100 |
| (Portugal) (Spain) (Switzerland) 2028 | To be determined | | | | | | | |
| (Czech Republic) (Denmark) (Poland) 2030 | Qualified as co-host | | | | | | | |
| (France) (Germany) 2032 | To be determined | | | | | | | |
| Total | 13/20 | – | 63 | 19 | 5 | 39 | 1676 | 1793 |

== Team ==
=== Current squad ===
Roster for the 2026 European Men's Handball Championship.

Head coach: Ondřej Mika

| No. | Pos. | Name | Date of birth (age) | Height | App. | Goals | Club |
|---|---|---|---|---|---|---|---|
| 1 | GK | Tomáš Mrkva | 20 January 1989 (age 37) | 2.01 m | 140 | 12 | (Germany) SC DHfK Leipzig |
| 3 | LW | Petr Široký | 8 December 2002 (age 23) | 1.86 m | 3 | 8 | (Czech Republic) HCB Karviná |
| 6 | RB | Dominik Skopár | 4 May 2006 (age 20) | 1.80 m | 16 | 48 | (Czech Republic) Talent Plzeň |
| 7 | RB | Tomáš Piroch | 12 May 2000 (age 26) | 1.87 m | 50 | 125 | (Germany) SC DHfK Leipzig |
| 8 | LW | Pavel Chotěborský | 29 July 2003 (age 22) | 1.85 m | 6 | 4 | (Czech Republic) HK Lovosice |
| 14 | RW | Jakub Štěrba | 11 July 1996 (age 29) | 1.84 m | 34 | 67 | (Germany) GWD Minden |
| 23 | LB | Jonáš Josef | 29 July 2004 (age 21) | 1.90 m | 13 | 26 | (Czech Republic) Dukla Prague |
| 28 | CB | Matěj Havran | 22 January 2002 (age 24) | 1.90 m | 29 | 17 | (Hungary) Tatabánya KC |
| 33 | P | Matěj Nantl | 15 July 1998 (age 27) | 1.95 m | 16 | 13 | (Czech Republic) HCB Karviná |
| 34 | LB | Dominik Solák | 17 August 1997 (age 28) | 1.99 m | 54 | 89 | (Czech Republic) HCB Karviná |
| 37 | P | Jan Užek | 11 October 1993 (age 32) | 1.94 m | 39 | 40 | (Czech Republic) HCB Karviná |
| 39 | CB | Lukáš Mořkovský | 4 January 2002 (age 24) | 1.89 m | 23 | 47 | (Czech Republic) HC Zubří |
| 43 | CB | Jakub Douda | 7 March 1994 (age 32) | 1.89 m | 10 | 12 | (Czech Republic) Talent Plzeň |
| 49 | LB | Daniel Bláha | 27 December 2005 (age 20) | 2.12 m | 17 | 26 | (Czech Republic) Talent Plzeň |
| 53 | LB | Martin Brězina | 22 August 2001 (age 24) | 1.90 m | 14 | 2 | (Czech Republic) Dukla Prague |
| 77 | P | Daniel Režnický | 26 March 1998 (age 28) | 1.90 m | 31 | 25 | (Switzerland) Kadetten Schaffhausen |
| 87 | RB | Filip Tůma | 9 November 2005 (age 20) | 1.87 m | 2 | 4 | (Czech Republic) TJ Sokol Nové Veselí |
| 96 | GK | Jan Hrdlička | 10 November 1996 (age 29) | 1.89 m | 28 | 0 | (Germany) HB Ludwigsburg |

=== Notable former players ===
- Jan Filip
- Martin Galia
- Filip Jícha
- David Juříček
- Daniel Kubeš
- Karel Nocar
- Petr Štochl

=== Player statistics ===
Most capped players
| Player | Games | Position |
|---|---|---|
| Jan Filip | 220 | W |
| Martin Galia | 201 | GK |
| Karel Nocar | 184 | W |
| Petr Štochl | 182 | GK |
| Filip Jícha | 155 | OB |
| Daniel Kubeš | 140 | P |
| Pavel Horák | 122 | OB |
| Ondřej Zdráhala | 117 | CB |
| Roman Bečvář | 111 | CB |
| Jakub Hrstka | 103 | W |
| Jan Sobol | 101 | W |
| Tomáš Mrkva | 90 | GK |

Top Scorers
| Player | Goals | Average | Position |
|---|---|---|---|
| Jan Filip | 960 | 4.36 | W |
| Filip Jícha | 877 | | OB |
| Karel Nocar | 432 | | W |
| Ondřej Zdráhala | 408 | | CB |
| Pavel Horák | 350 | | OB |
| Jakub Hrstka | 337 | | W |
| Jan Sobol | 274 | | W |
| Roman Bečvář | 238 | | CB |
