= Czech Handball Extraliga =

Professional handball league in the Czech Republic

Chance Extraliga
- Current season, competition or edition: 2025–26 Czech Handball Extraliga
- Sport: Handball
- Founded: 1993
- No. of teams: 12
- Country: Czech Republic
- Confederation: EHF
- Most recent champion: Talent Plzeň
- Most titles: HCB Karviná (14 titles)
- International cups: EHF Cup; EHF Challenge Cup
- Website: https://www.extraligahazene.cz/

The Czech Extraliga is the name of the professional handball league of Czech Republic.

== Competition format ==
The season begins with a regular season between the twelve teams. The first eight teams qualifies for the play-offs, while the last four plays a relegation round.

== Naming and sponsorship ==
The name of the league is leased to a general sponsor and changes frequently.

- 1993 - 1995: 1.liga
- 1995 - 2007: Extraliga
- 2007 - 2011: Zubr extraliga
- 2011 - 2014: Tipgames extraliga
- 2014 - 2015: Triglav pojišťovna extraliga
- 2015 - 2020: Extraliga
- 2020 - 2022: STRABAG Rail Extraliga
- 2022 - current: Chance Extraliga

== Current teams ==
=== Teams for season 2024–25 ===
Location of teams in 2024–25 Chance Extraliga
- HK FCC Město Lovosice
- Talent Plzeň
- HCB Karviná
- HC Dukla Prague
- HC ROBE Zubří
- SKP Frýdek-Místek
- KH Kopřivnice
- TJ Sokol Nové Veselí
- SKKP Handball Brno
- HBC Medipoint Jičín
- HBC Strakonice 1921
- SHC Maloměřice Brno

== Extraliga Past Champions ==
- 1994 : HC Dukla Prague
- 1995 : HC Dukla Prague (2)
- 1996 : Cabot Zubří
- 1997 : Cabot Zubří (2)
- 1998 : Kovopetrol Plzeň
- 1999 : Kovopetrol Plzeň (2)
- 2000 : HCB OKD Karviná
- 2001 : HCB OKD Karviná (2)
- 2002 : HCB OKD Karviná (3)
- 2003 : SKP Frýdek-Místek
- 2004 : HCB OKD Karviná (4)
- 2005 : HCB OKD Karviná (5)
- 2006 : HCB OKD Karviná (6)
- 2007 : HCB OKD Karviná (7)
- 2008 : HCB OKD Karviná (8)
- 2009 : HCB OKD Karviná (9)
- 2010 : HCB OKD Karviná (10)
- 2011 : HC Dukla Prague (3)
- 2012 : HC Gumárny Zubří (3)
- 2013 : HBC Ronal Jičín
- 2014 : SSK Talent M.A.T. Plzeň (3)
- 2015 : SSK Talent M.A.T. Plzeň (4)
- 2016 : SSK Talent M.A.T. Plzeň (5)
- 2017 : HC Dukla Prague (4)
- 2018 : HCB OKD Karviná (11)
- 2019 : SSK Talent M.A.T Plzeň (6)
- 2020 : not awarded
- 2021 : SSK Talent M.A.T Plzeň (7)
- 2022 : HCB OKD Karviná (12)
- 2023 : SSK Talent M.A.T Plzeň (8)
- 2024 : HCB Karviná (13)
- 2025 : HCB Karviná (14)
- 2026 : Talent Plzeň (9)

	Club	Titles	Year
1.	HCB OKD Karviná	14	2000, 2001, 2002, 2004, 2005, 2006, 2007, 2008, 2009, 2010, 2018, 2022, 2024, 2025
2.	SSK Talent M.A.T. Plzeň	9	1998, 1999, 2014, 2015, 2016, 2019, 2021, 2023, 2026
3.	HC Dukla Prague	4	1994, 1995, 2011, 2017
4.	HC Zubří	3	1996, 1997, 2012
5.	SKP Frýdek-Místek	1	2003
	HBC Ronal Jičín	1	2013

== EHF coefficient ranking ==
For season 2019/20, see footnote

- 16. (17) (Netherlands) Eredivisie (16.40)
- 17. (18) Handball Liga Austria (13.00)
- 18. (20) (Czech Republic) Extraliga (12.56)
- 19. (19) Handball League of Serbia (9.10)
- 20. (21) (Switzerland) Swiss Handball League (8.20)
