= 2025–26 Handball-Bundesliga =

Handball league season

Handball-Bundesliga
- Season: 2025–26
- Dates: 27 August 2025 – 7 June 2026
- Champions: SC Magdeburg
- Relegated: GWD Minden; SC DHfK Leipzig
- Champions League: SC Magdeburg; Füchse Berlin; MT Melsungen (as Europa League winners)
- EHF European League: SG Flensburg-Handewitt; VfL Gummersbach; Bergischer HC
- Matches: 306
- Goals: 18,483 (60.4 per match)
- Best player: Mathias Gidsel
- Top goalscorer: Mathias Gidsel (317 goals)
- Total attendance: 1,708,675
- Average attendance: 5,584

The 2025–26 Handball-Bundesliga was the 61st season of the Handball-Bundesliga, Germany's premier handball league and the 48th season consisting of only one league. It ran from 27 August 2025 to 7 June 2026.

== Teams ==
Locations of the 2025–26 Handball-Bundesliga teams

=== Team changes ===
Promoted from 2024–25 2. Handball-Bundesliga	Relegated from 2024–25 Handball-Bundesliga
Bergischer HC; GWD Minden	1. VfL Potsdam; SG BBM Bietigheim

=== Stadiums ===
Team	Location	Arena	Capacity
Bergischer HC	Wuppertal	Uni-Halle	3,200
Füchse Berlin	Berlin	Max-Schmeling-Halle	9,000
ThSV Eisenach	Eisenach	Werner-Aßmann-Halle	3,100
HC Erlangen	Nuremberg	PSD Bank Nürnberg Arena	8,308
SG Flensburg-Handewitt	Flensburg	GP Joule Arena	6,300
Frisch Auf Göppingen	Göppingen	EWS Arena	5,600
VfL Gummersbach	Gummersbach	Schwalbe-Arena	4,132
HSV Hamburg	Hamburg	Alsterdorfer Sporthalle	7,000
TSV Hannover-Burgdorf	Hanover	ZAG-Arena; Swiss Life Hall	10,767; 4,460
THW Kiel	Kiel	Wunderino Arena	10,285
SC DHfK Leipzig	Leipzig	Quarterback Immobilien Arena	6,327
TBV Lemgo	Lemgo	Phoenix-Contact-Arena	4,520
SC Magdeburg	Magdeburg	GETEC Arena	6,600
MT Melsungen	Kassel	Rothenbach-Halle	4,500
GWD Minden	Minden	Kampa-Halle	4,059
Rhein-Neckar Löwen	Mannheim	SAP Arena	13,200
TVB Stuttgart	Stuttgart	Porsche-Arena	6,211
HSG Wetzlar	Wetzlar	Buderus Arena Wetzlar	4,421

== Standings ==
Pos	Team	Pld	W	D	L	GF	GA	GD	Pts	Qualification or relegation
1	SC Magdeburg (C)	34	31	2	1	1115	934	+181	64	Champions League
2	Füchse Berlin	34	27	1	6	1221	1030	+191	55	Champions League
3	SG Flensburg-Handewitt	34	24	3	7	1200	1084	+116	51	EHF European League
4	VfL Gummersbach	34	23	4	7	1067	942	+125	50	EHF European League
5	TBV Lemgo	34	19	4	11	1021	977	+44	42	
6	THW Kiel	34	17	8	9	1043	1010	+33	42	
7	MT Melsungen	34	17	5	12	1002	1000	+2	39	Champions League (Note: MT Melsungen qualified for the Champions League as the 2025–26 EHF European League winners.)
8	Rhein-Neckar Löwen	34	17	3	14	1024	981	+43	37	
9	Frisch Auf Göppingen	34	13	7	14	958	995	−37	33	
10	HSV Hamburg	34	15	1	18	1065	1086	−21	31	
11	TSV Hannover-Burgdorf	34	11	7	16	1015	1027	−12	29	
12	TVB Stuttgart	34	10	8	16	998	1035	−37	28	
13	Bergischer HC	34	9	4	21	980	1071	−91	22	EHF European League (Note: Since the winners of the 2025–26 DHB-Pokal, Füchse Berlin, qualified for the Champions League by league position, the European League spot was passed to the runners-up.)
14	ThSV Eisenach	34	8	5	21	985	1058	−73	21	
15	HC Erlangen	34	7	5	22	936	1013	−77	19	
16	HSG Wetzlar	34	7	3	24	969	1070	−101	17	
17	GWD Minden (R)	34	6	5	23	942	1090	−148	17	Relegated to 2. Handball-Bundesliga
18	SC DHfK Leipzig (R)	34	4	7	23	942	1080	−138	15	Relegated to 2. Handball-Bundesliga

Source: DKB
Rules for classification: 1) points; 2) head-to-head points; 3) head-to-head goal difference; 4) head-to-head number of goals scored; 5) goal difference; 6) goals scored.
(C) Champions; (R) Relegated

== Results ==
Home \ Away	BRG	BER	EIS	ERL	FLE	GÖP	HAM	GUM	HAN	KIE	LEI	LEM	MAG	MEL	MIN	RNL	STU	WET
Bergischer HC	—	28–35	27–26	29–33	33–43	29–28	35–32	30–39	30–29	23–32	28–28	27–28	25–27	26–29	23–30	30–27	25–25	35–28
Füchse Berlin	39–27	—	35–23	45–29	43–38	42–29	38–39	28–26	30–30	32–29	39–26	33–34	32–39	30–24	42–27	35–28	37–32	35–28
ThSV Eisenach	33–31	38–41	—	25–25	32–38	31–27	33–40	32–29	26–35	27–27	31–27	34–38	25–30	27–29	33–28	29–29	28–24	29–28
HC Erlangen	26–32	35–38	24–23	—	29–34	28–29	23–31	22–26	29–30	29–31	30–26	24–25	31–31	26–26	36–31	29–27	24–24	33–26
SG Flensburg-Handewitt	36–29	40–39	36–31	36–30	—	32–26	33–29	37–37	37–29	36–34	36–28	38–30	31–35	40–30	35–31	33–29	29–29	35–31
Frisch Auf Göppingen	26–21	26–32	26–23	27–24	32–33	—	34–30	24–36	30–26	24–28	24–24	26–33	23–27	26–26	28–28	32–30	32–33	31–30
HSV Hamburg	34–35	28–36	32–28	34–26	35–38	28–34	—	31–30	29–33	27–34	33–35	35–35	29–30	25–23	32–26	33–30	31–26	33–32
VfL Gummersbach	29–29	34–29	35–27	33–22	33–26	29–29	33–27	—	33–27	25–25	34–27	28–27	31–32	29–28	32–22	28–27	33–26	32–24
TSV Hannover-Burgdorf	34–30	28–32	32–30	26–32	33–35	22–28	35–37	26–29	—	34–40	36–33	30–30	22–24	32–32	26–26	28–24	28–22	30–25
THW Kiel	43–35	28–35	30–30	28–25	37–33	34–30	27–25	26–34	29–29	—	28–28	31–34	31–29	31–29	33–25	31–31	33–32	34–30
SC DHfK Leipzig	28–35	26–34	29–29	30–29	24–42	29–34	29–27	31–37	27–27	34–41	—	29–34	23–36	27–33	26–25	26–30	29–29	24–25
TBV Lemgo	28–25	33–34	28–19	27–21	34–33	27–30	39–32	31–25	29–30	23–23	30–28	—	29–33	26–27	28–32	25–22	32–30	28–25
SC Magdeburg	39–30	35–33	34–28	35–31	31–30	37–26	41–28	38–35	35–30	26–26	29–28	36–32	—	31–27	38–21	28–24	32–23	33–20
MT Melsungen	33–28	28–39	37–34	32–32	32–35	31–23	32–28	24–31	29–29	30–29	34–25	28–22	23–34	—	32–28	27–29	33–28	33–32
GWD Minden	28–28	28–39	29–34	30–29	27–40	28–28	29–30	23–31	33–30	34–30	32–26	24–34	21–36	27–30	—	28–34	32–32	31–33
Rhein-Neckar Löwen	28–25	30–33	31–28	35–27	33–36	30–30	35–29	34–32	29–28	27–28	30–24	32–30	30–33	30–22	28–24	—	38–34	41–27
TVB Stuttgart	35–28	30–36	33–31	22–17	37–33	28–28	33–36	22–28	35–34	32–27	33–32	32–32	26–30	29–31	35–26	26–32	—	30–27
HSG Wetzlar	33–29	27–41	33–27	29–26	33–33	26–28	25–35	29–31	28–38	33–25	26–26	21–26	30–31	32–38	39–28	23–30	31–31	—

Source: DKB
Legend: Blue = home team win; Yellow = draw; Red = away team win.

== Top goalscorers ==
Rank	Player	Club	Goals	Shots	%
1	(Denmark) Mathias Gidsel	Füchse Berlin	317	427	74
2	(Germany) Kai Häfner	TVB Stuttgart	255	372	69
3	(Iceland) Ómar Ingi Magnússon	SC Magdeburg	226	305	74
4	(Norway) August Pedersen	TSV Hannover-Burgdorf	214	293	73
5	(Iceland) Haukur Þrastarson	Rhein-Neckar Löwen	212	342	62
6	(Netherlands) Niels Versteijnen	TBV Lemgo	208	325	64
6	(Germany) Jannik Kohlbacher	Rhein-Neckar Löwen	207	250	83
8	(Denmark) Emil Jakobsen	SG Flensburg-Handewitt	205	265	77
8	(Denmark) Nicolaj Jørgensen	HSV Hamburg	205	337	61
10	(Germany) Noah Beyer	Bergischer HC	195	253	77
