= Fabian Wiede =

German handball player (born 1994)

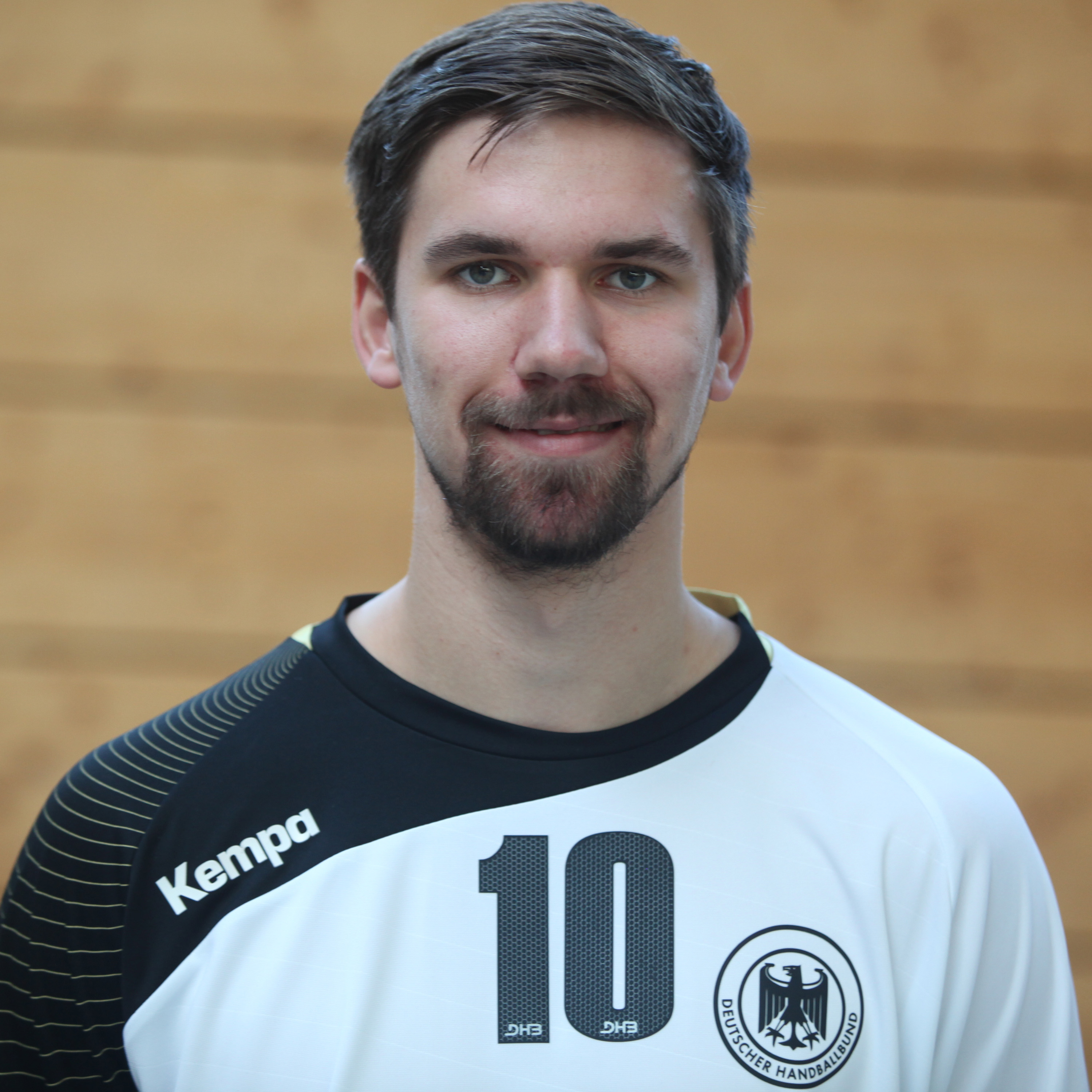

Personal information
- Nationality: German
- Born: 8 February 1994 (age 32) Bad Belzig, Germany
- Height: 1.94 m (6 ft 4 in)

Sport
- Sport: Handball
- Position: Right back
- Current club: Füchse Berlin
- Number: 3

Youth career
- Years: Team
- 1999–2006: MBSV Belzig
- 2006–2009: 1. VfL Potsdam
- 2009–2013: Füchse Berlin

Senior clubs
- Years: Team
- 2012–: Füchse Berlin
National team
Years	Team	Apps	(Gls)
2014–	Germany	91	(174)
Medal record
Olympic Games
Bronze medal – third place	2016 Rio de Janeiro	Team
European Championship
Gold medal – first place	2016 Poland
- Updated on 2 July 2023

Fabian Wiede (born 8 February 1994) is a German handball player for Füchse Berlin and the German national team. He has played his entire senior career at the club.

He was part of the German team that won the 2016 European Men's Handball Championship.

== Career ==
Wiede started playing handball in 1999 at MBSV Belzig. From 2006 to 2009 he played for 1. VfL Potsdam, after which he transferred to Füchse Berlin. Here he won the German Youth championship in 2013. He debuted for the senior team in the 2012-13 season, and by 2013-14 he was regularly in the first team. With the club he won the DHB-Pokal in 2014 andt EHF Cup in 2015 and 2018, and the EHF European League in 2023. Two seasons later he won the 2024-25 Handball-Bundesliga, which was the first in club history. The same season he played in the 2024-25 EHF Champions League final, where Füchse lost to league rivals SC Magdeburg.

=== Seasons statistics ===
Season	Team	League	Games	Goals	Penalty goals	Outfield goals
2012/13	Füchse Berlin	Bundesliga	9	7	1	6
2013/14	Füchse Berlin	Bundesliga	34	68	0	68
2014/15	Füchse Berlin	Bundesliga	36	87	10	77
2015/16	Füchse Berlin	Bundesliga	32	142	29	113
2016/17	Füchse Berlin	Bundesliga	24	89	18	71
2017/18	Füchse Berlin	Bundesliga	31	105	1	104
2018/19	Füchse Berlin	Bundesliga	24	89	2	87
2019/20	Füchse Berlin	Bundesliga	20	65	0	65
2020/21	Füchse Berlin	Bundesliga	37	112	2	110
2021/22	Füchse Berlin	Bundesliga	28	80	0	80
2022/23	Füchse Berlin	Bundesliga	32	84	0	84
2012–2023	Total	Bundesliga	314	928	63	865

Source: Player profile at the Handball-Bundesliga

=== National team ===
Wiede played 17 matches for the German youth national team, scoring 41 goals.

In January 2014 he was for the first time in the German senior team. He debuted on January 4th, 2014 against Russia.

In 2016 he was part of the German team that won the 2016 European Championship. At the 2016 Olympics he won bronze medals with the German team, for which he was awarded the Silbernes Lorbeerblatt.

In November 2016 Wiede had a severe shoulder injury, which made him miss the 2017 World Championship. He was back in the team for the 2018 European Championship.

He participated at the 2019 World Championship, where Germany finished fifth.

In 2020 a shoulder injury would once again keep him out of a major international tournament, this time the 2020 European Championship. For the 2022 European Championship he was not part of the initial squad, but joined the team after the second game of the tournament.

== Achievements ==
- EHF European League:
  - Gold: 2015, 2018, 2023
  - Silver: 2017, 2019, 2021
- DHB-Pokal:
  - Gold: 2014
- Handball-Bundesliga:
  - Gold: 2025
- DHB-Supercup:
  - Silver: 2014
- IHF Super Globe:
  - Gold: 2015, 2016
  - Silver: 2017, 2018

Individual awards

- MVP of the Final four at the 2022–23 EHF European League
