= Füchse Berlin (handball) =

German handball club

- Nickname: Die Füchse (The Foxes)
- Founded: 1891; 135 years ago
- Arena: Max-Schmeling-Halle, Berlin
- Capacity: 8,500
- Head coach: Nicolej Krickau
- League: Handball-Bundesliga
- 2025–26: 2nd of 18
Home	Away

Füchse Berlin is a professional handball club from Berlin, Germany, that currently competes in the Handball-Bundesliga, the highest national league, and in EHF competitions.

The women's team play in the 2nd Bundesliga.

Location of Füchse Berlin

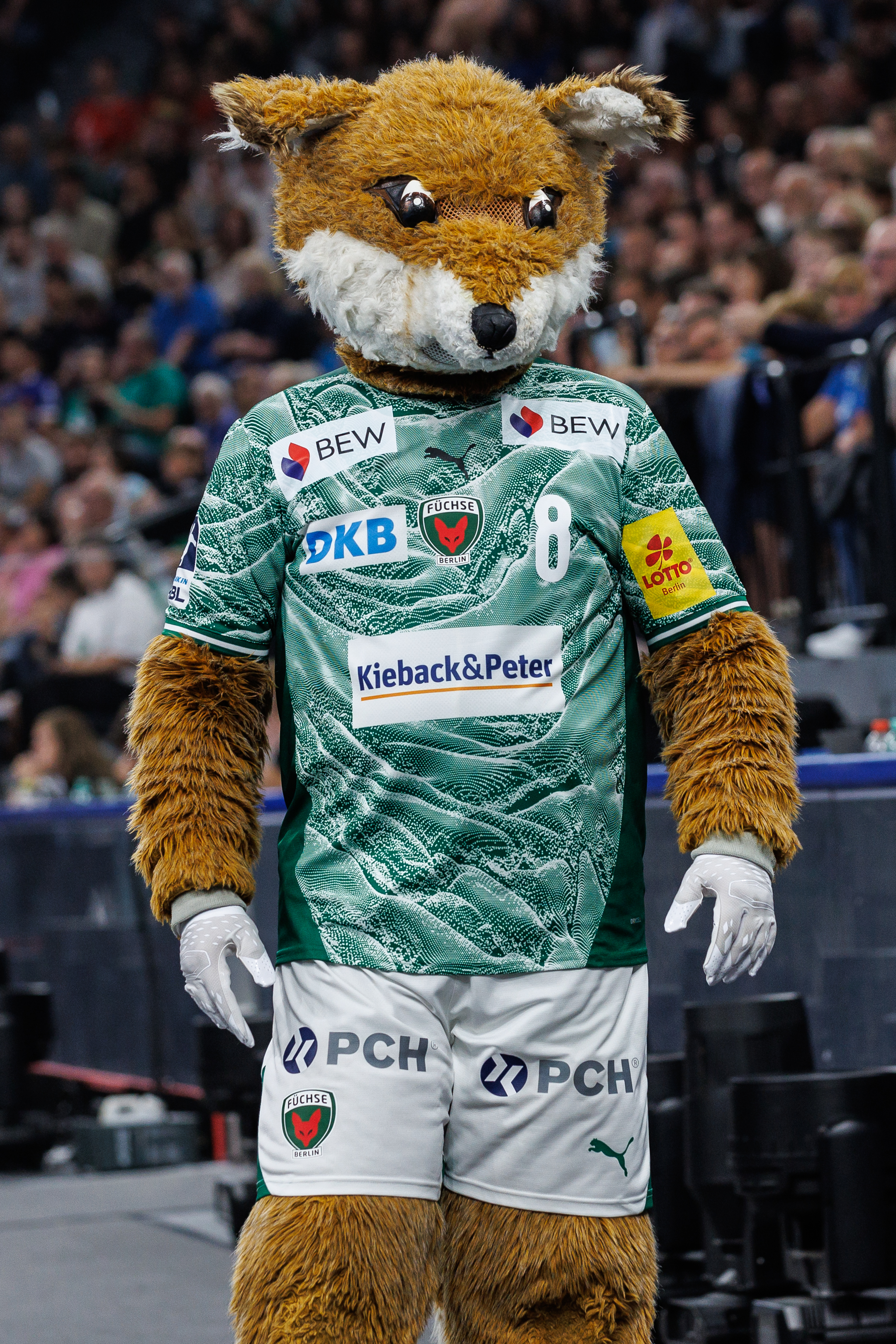
Fuchsi – the official mascot of Füchse Berlin.

== History ==
Until 2005, the club was organized as handball department of Reinickendorfer Füchse, which was founded in 1891. For the 2005–06 season, the branding was changed to Füchse Berlin, in an effort to establish the club as a leading sports team of Berlin alongside Hertha BSC (football), Eisbären Berlin (ice hockey) and Alba Berlin (basketball). This coincided with the move to Max-Schmeling-Halle (Berlin's second biggest indoor sports venue), which is dubbed Fuchsbau (burrow in English). The team played in the 2nd Bundesliga at the time. In 2007, the Füchse secured the championship in the Zweite Handball-Bundeliga, thus advancing to Handball-Bundesliga, which the club has stayed in ever since.

In 2014 the team won the DHB-Pokal, its first major trophy by defeating SG Flensburg-Handewitt 22–21.

As German cup winners they qualified for the 2014–15 EHF Cup, which they won to gain their first international title. As winner of the EHF Cup the Füchse earned a wild card spot for the 2015 IHF Super Globe, which they also won.

In the 2024-25 season they won their first German championship ever. Their coach Jaron Siewert became the youngest coach ever to win the Bundesliga at 31 years.

Despite the previous season's success, the club decided to fire Jaron Siewert just two matches into the following season along with sporting director Stefan Kretzschmar after a public disagreement between them managing director Bob Hanning. To replace him, the club hired Danish coach Nicolej Krickau.

== Crest, colours, supporters ==
=== Kit manufacturers ===
Period	Kit manufacturer
–2014	(Germany) Kempa
2014–2020	(Denmark) Hummel
2020–present	(Germany) Puma

=== Kits ===
HOME
2019–20	2020-21	2021-

AWAY
2011–12	2013–14	2020-21

== Sports Hall information ==
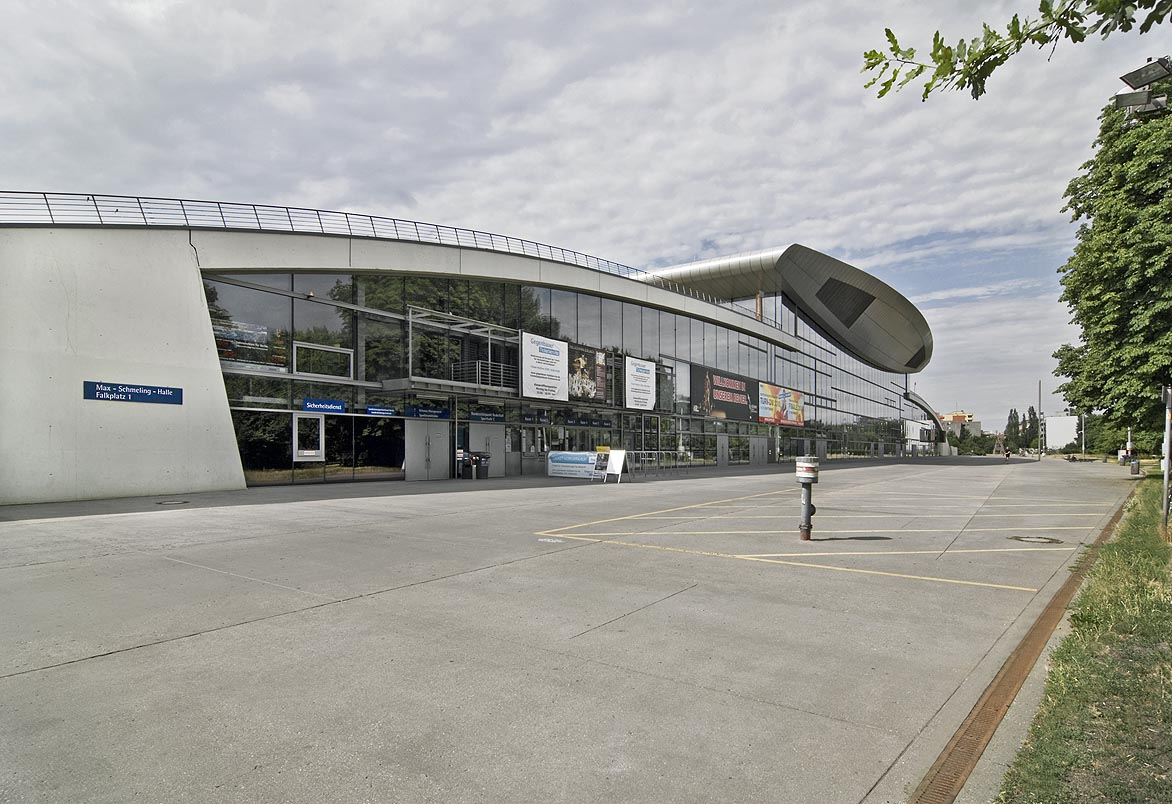
Home hall: Max-Schmeling-Halle

- Name: – Max-Schmeling-Halle
- City: – Berlin
- Capacity: – 8500
- Address: – Am Falkplatz 1, 10437 Berlin, Germany

== Team ==
=== Current squad ===
Squad for the 2026–27 season

Goalkeepers

- 1 (Germany) Lasse Ludwig
- 12 (Sweden) Andreas Palicka

Left wingers

- 14 (Spain) Aitor Ariño
- 20 (Germany) Tim Freihöfer

Right wingers

- 6 (Italy) Leo Prantner
- 34 (Faroe Islands) Hákun West Av Teigum

Line players

- 5 (Sweden) Max Darj
- 9 (Germany) Frederik Simak
- 93 (Serbia) Mijajlo Marsenić

Left backs

- 24 (Germany) Lauro Pichiri
- 25 (Germany) Matthes Langhoff
- 30 (France) Aymeric Zaepfel

Centre backs

- 15 (Norway) Tobias Grøndahl
- 17 (Germany) Nils Lichtlein

Right backs

- 3 (Germany) Fabian Wiede
- 19 (Denmark) Mathias Gidsel

=== Technical staff ===
- Head coach: (Denmark) Nicolej Krickau
- Assistant coach: (Germany) Maximilian Rinderle
- Goalkeeping coach: (Serbia) Dejan Perić
- Athletic Trainer: (Germany) Carsten Köhrbrück
- Physiotherapist: (Germany) Tim Schilling
- Club doctor: (Germany) Sebastian Bierke

=== Transfers ===
Transfers for the 2026–27 season

Joining

- (Sweden) Andreas Palicka (GK) from (Germany) HSG Wetzlar
- (France) Aymeric Zaepfel (LB) from (France) Pays d'Aix Université Club
- (Austria) Clemens Möstl (LB) from (Austria) HC Linz AG
- (Germany) Lauro Pichiri (LB) back from loan at (Germany) HC Elbflorenz Dresden
- (Germany) Max Beneke (RB) back from loan at (Germany) ThSV Eisenach
- (Germany) Frederik Simak (LP) from (Germany) TBV Lemgo Lippe

Leaving

- (Serbia) Dejan Milosavljev (GK) to (Poland) Industria Kielce
- (Austria) Felix Bernkop-Schnürch (LW) on loan at (Germany) 1. VfL Potsdam
- (Denmark) Lasse Andersson (LB) to (Denmark) HØJ Elite
- (Austria) Clemens Möstl (LB) on loan at (Germany) 1. VfL Potsdam
- (Slovenia) Nejc Cehte (RB) to (North Macedonia) RK Alkaloid
- (Germany) Max Beneke (RB) to (Germany) Frisch Auf Göppingen
- (Austria) Lukas Herburger (LP) to (Switzerland) HC Kriens-Luzern

Transfers for the 2027–28 season

Joining

- (Denmark) Simon Pytlick (LB) from (Germany) SG Flensburg-Handewitt
- (France) Dika Mem (RB) from (Spain) FC Barcelona
- (France) Théo Monar (LP) from (Poland) Industria Kielce
- (Germany) Tim Niclas Schröder (LP) back from loan at (Germany) 1. VfL Potsdam

Leaving

- (Sweden) Andreas Palicka (GK) to (Sweden) IFK Kristianstad ?
- (Germany) Lauro Pichiri (LB) to (Germany) Frisch Auf Göppingen
- (Sweden) Max Darj (LP) to (Germany) Rhein-Neckar Löwen ?
- (Serbia) Mijajlo Marsenić (LP) to (Romania) CS Dinamo București ?

=== Transfer History ===
Transfers for the 2025–26 season

Joining

- (Spain) Aitor Ariño (LW) from (Spain) FC Barcelona
- (Norway) Tobias Grøndahl (CB) from (Denmark) GOG Håndbold
- (Slovenia) Nejc Cehte (RB) from (North Macedonia) RK Eurofarm Pelister
- (Austria) Felix Bernkop-Schnürch (LW) from (Austria) SG Handball West Wien

Leaving

- (Sweden) Jerry Tollbring (LW) to (Denmark) Ribe-Esbjerg HH
- (Germany) Max Beneke (RB) on loan at (Germany) ThSV Eisenach
- (Croatia) Manuel Štrlek (LW) loan back to (Croatia) RK Nexe Našice
- (Germany) Felix Mart (CB) to (Germany) TUSEM Essen
- (Germany) Anton Preussner (RB) to (Germany) HC Elbflorenz Dresden
- (Germany) Lauro Pichiri (LB) on loan at (Germany) HC Elbflorenz Dresden

== Previous squads ==
2017–2018 Team
Shirt No	Nationality	Player	Birth Date	Position
3	Germany	Fabian Wiede	8 February 1994 (age 32)	Right Back
4	Iceland	Bjarki Már Elísson	16 May 1990 (age 36)	Left Winger
5	Germany	Oliver Milde	9 July 1993 (age 33)	Left Back
6	Croatia	Drago Vuković	3 August 1983 (age 43)	Central Back
7	Germany	Kevin Struck	31 December 1996 (age 29)	Right Back
9	Croatia	Stipe Mandalinić	9 September 1992 (age 34)	Left Back
10	Croatia	Jakov Gojun	18 April 1986 (age 40)	Left Back
12	Germany	Silvio Heinevetter	21 October 1984 (age 42)	Goalkeeper
13	Serbia	Petar Nenadić	28 June 1986 (age 40)	Central Back
17	Spain	Ignacio Plaza Jiménez	10 January 1994 (age 32)	Line Player
18	Denmark	Hans Lindberg	1 August 1981 (age 45)	Right Winger
21	Sweden	Mattias Zachrisson	22 August 1990 (age 36)	Right Winger
23	Germany	Steffen Fäth	4 April 1990 (age 36)	Left Back
25	Spain	Rolando Urios Gonzales	10 April 1999 (age 27)	Line Player
28	Germany	Erik Schmidt	28 December 1992 (age 33)	Line Player
31	Germany	Tim Matthes	5 May 1999 (age 27)	Left Winger
35	Croatia	Marko Kopljar	12 February 1986 (age 40)	Right Back
43	Germany	Christoph Reißky	11 August 1995 (age 31)	Right Back
71	Czech Republic	Petr Štochl	24 April 1976 (age 50)	Goalkeeper
77	Denmark	Johan Koch	29 November 1990 (age 35)	Line Player
95	Germany	Paul Drux	7 February 1995 (age 31)	Left Back

2015–2016 Team
Shirt No	Nationality	Player	Birth Date	Position
3	Germany	Fabian Wiede	8 February 1994 (age 32)	Right Back
4	Iceland	Bjarki Már Elísson	16 May 1990 (age 36)	Left Winger
6	Croatia	Drago Vuković	3 August 1983 (age 43)	Central Back
7	Germany	Kevin Struck	31 December 1996 (age 29)	Right Back
10	Croatia	Jakov Gojun	18 April 1986 (age 40)	Left Back
11	Bosnia and Herzegovina	Faruk Vražalić	22 June 1990 (age 36)	Right Winger
12	Germany	Silvio Heinevetter	21 October 1984 (age 42)	Goalkeeper
13	Serbia	Petar Nenadić	28 June 1986 (age 40)	Central Back
15	Norway	Kent Robin Tønnesen	5 June 1991 (age 35)	Right Back
17	Spain	Ignacio Plaza Jiménez	10 January 1994 (age 32)	Line Player
20	Germany	Willy Weyhrauch	14 March 1994 (age 32)	Right Winger
21	Sweden	Mattias Zachrisson	22 August 1990 (age 36)	Right Winger
22	Slovenia	Mark Ferjan	30 June 1998 (age 28)	Goalkeeper
23	Germany	Moritz Schade	10 January 1996 (age 30)	Line Player
31	Slovenia	Tim Rozman	11 December 1998 (age 27)	Right Back
36	Sweden	Jesper Nielsen	30 September 1989 (age 37)	Line Player
71	Czech Republic	Petr Štochl	24 April 1976 (age 50)	Goalkeeper
83	Sweden	Fredrik Petersen	23 August 1983 (age 43)	Left Winger
94	Germany	Jaron Siewert	31 January 1994 (age 32)	Central Back
95	Germany	Paul Drux	7 February 1995 (age 31)	Left Back

2014–2015 Team
Shirt No	Nationality	Player	Birth Date	Position
2	Germany	Colja Löffler	8 May 1989 (age 37)	Left Winger
3	Germany	Fabian Wiede	8 February 1994 (age 32)	Right Back
5	Germany	Jonas Thümmler	21 August 1993 (age 33)	Line Player
6	Japan	Kohei Narita	15 June 1989 (age 37)	Left Winger
7	Germany	Kevin Struck	31 December 1996 (age 29)	Right Back
9	Croatia	Denis Špoljarić	20 August 1979 (age 47)	Central Back
12	Germany	Silvio Heinevetter	21 October 1984 (age 42)	Goalkeeper
13	Serbia	Petar Nenadić	28 June 1986 (age 40)	Central Back
14	Germany	Evgeni Pevnov	13 February 1989 (age 37)	Line Player
18	Spain	Iker Romero	15 June 1980 (age 46)	Central Back
20	Germany	Willy Weyhrauch	14 March 1994 (age 32)	Right Winger
21	Sweden	Mattias Zachrisson	22 August 1990 (age 36)	Right Winger
22	Germany	Tom-Luick Skroblien	19 April 1993 (age 33)	Left Winger
23	Germany	Moritz Schade	10 January 1996 (age 30)	Line Player
24	Poland	Bartłomiej Jaszka	16 June 1983 (age 43)	Central Back
26	Denmark	Kasper Nielsen	9 June 1975 (age 51)	Line Player
28	Czech Republic	Pavel Horák	28 November 1982 (age 43)	Left Back
30	Germany	Christoph Reißky	11 August 1995 (age 31)	Left Back
35	Russia	Konstantin Igropulo	14 April 1985 (age 41)	Right Back
36	Sweden	Jesper Nielsen	30 September 1989 (age 37)	Line Player
71	Czech Republic	Petr Štochl	24 April 1976 (age 50)	Goalkeeper
83	Sweden	Fredrik Petersen	23 August 1983 (age 43)	Left Winger
94	Germany	Jaron Siewert	31 January 1994 (age 32)	Central Back
95	Germany	Paul Drux	7 February 1995 (age 31)	Left Back

2013–2014 Team
Shirt No	Nationality	Player	Birth Date	Position
1	Germany	Maximilian Kroll	20 January 1993 (age 33)	Goalkeeper
2	Germany	Colja Löffler	8 May 1989 (age 37)	Left Winger
3	Germany	Fabian Wiede	8 February 1994 (age 32)	Right Back
4	Germany	Oliver Milde	9 July 1993 (age 33)	Left Back
5	Germany	Jonas Thümmler	21 August 1993 (age 33)	Line Player
9	Croatia	Denis Špoljarić	20 August 1979 (age 47)	Central Back
11	Germany	Markus Richwien	5 July 1985 (age 41)	Right Winger
12	Germany	Silvio Heinevetter	21 October 1984 (age 42)	Goalkeeper
13	Germany	Jaron Siewert	31 January 1994 (age 32)	Central Back
18	Spain	Iker Romero	15 June 1980 (age 46)	Central Back
20	Germany	Willy Weyhrauch	14 March 1994 (age 32)	Right Winger
21	Sweden	Mattias Zachrisson	22 August 1990 (age 36)	Right Winger
22	Germany	Tom-Luick Skroblien	19 April 1993 (age 33)	Left Winger
24	Poland	Bartłomiej Jaszka	16 June 1983 (age 43)	Central Back
28	Czech Republic	Pavel Horák	28 November 1982 (age 43)	Left Back
30	Germany	Christoph Reißky	11 August 1995 (age 31)	Left Back
35	Russia	Konstantin Igropulo	14 April 1985 (age 41)	Right Back
36	Sweden	Jesper Nielsen	30 September 1989 (age 37)	Line Player
66	Germany	Sven-Sören Christophersen	9 May 1985 (age 41)	Left Back
71	Czech Republic	Petr Štochl	24 April 1976 (age 50)	Goalkeeper
83	Sweden	Fredrik Petersen	23 August 1983 (age 43)	Left Winger
93	Germany	Kenji Hövels	9 July 1993 (age 33)	Central Back
95	Germany	Paul Drux	7 February 1995 (age 31)	Left Back

== Accomplishments ==
=== Domestic ===
- Handball-Bundesliga:
  - Gold: 2025
  - Silver: 2024
  - Bronze: 1982, 2011, 2012, 2018, 2022, 2023
- DHB-Pokal:
  - Gold: 2014, 2026
- DHB-Supercup:
  - Gold: 2024, 2025
  - Silver: 2014, 2026

=== International ===
- EHF Champions League:
  - Silver: 2025, 2026
- EHF Cup / EHF European League:
  - Gold: 2015, 2018, 2023
  - Silver: 2017, 2019, 2021, 2024
- IHF Super Globe:
  - Gold: 2015, 2016
  - Silver: 2017, 2018, 2023

== European record ==
=== EHF Cup and EHF European League ===
Season	Round	Club	Home	Away	Aggregate
2014–15; Winners	Round 3	(France) HBC Nantes	23–18	23–28	46–46 (a)
2014–15; Winners	Group stage (Group C)	(Denmark) Skjern Håndbold	29–24	28–32	1st
2014–15; Winners	Group stage (Group C)	(Serbia) RK Vojvodina	37–22	30–25	1st
2014–15; Winners	Group stage (Group C)	(Portugal) FC Porto	25–20	26–20	1st
2014–15; Winners	Semi-final (F4)	(Slovenia) RK Gorenje Velenje	27–24		
2014–15; Winners	Final (F4)	(Germany) HSV Hamburg	30–27		
2017–18; Winners	Round 3	(Portugal) FC Porto	33–25	30–27	63–52
2017–18; Winners	Group stage (Group B)	(France) Saint-Raphaël Var Handball	21–26	34–25	1st
2017–18; Winners	Group stage (Group B)	(Sweden) Lugi HF	34–25	32–27	1st
2017–18; Winners	Group stage (Group B)	(Spain) Helvetia Anaitasuna	34–23	30–28	1st
2017–18; Winners	Quarter-finals	(Croatia) RK Nexe Našice	25–16	20–28	45–44
2017–18; Winners	Semi-final (F4)	(Germany) Frisch Auf Göppingen	27–24		
2017–18; Winners	Final (F4)	(France) Saint-Raphaël Var Handball	28–25		
2022–23; Winners	Group stage (Group D)	(Denmark) Skanderborg-Aarhus	30–24	29–28	1st
2022–23; Winners	Group stage (Group D)	(Spain) Bidasoa Irun	34–29	40–32	1st
2022–23; Winners	Group stage (Group D)	(Ukraine) HC Motor	32–24	38–27	1st
2022–23; Winners	Group stage (Group D)	(North Macedonia) Eurofarm Pelister	34–25	43–34	1st
2022–23; Winners	Group stage (Group D)	(Portugal) Águas Santas Milaneza	34–20	29–23	1st
2022–23; Winners	Last 16	(Denmark) Skjern Håndbold	38–32	28–23	66–55
2022–23; Winners	Quarter-finals	(Switzerland) Kadetten Schaffhausen	30–24	33–37	63–61
2022–23; Winners	Semi-final (F4)	(France) Montpellier HB	35–29		
2022–23; Winners	Final (F4)	(Spain) Fraikin BM Granollers	36–31		

=== EHF ranking ===
As of 22 October 2026

Rank	Team	Points
1	(Germany) SC Magdeburg	706
2	(Spain) FC Barcelona	705
3	(Germany) Füchse Berlin	664
4	(Denmark) Aalborg Handbold	587
5	(Hungary) MKB Veszprem KC	508
6	(France) HBC Nantes	495

== Former club members ==
=== Notable former players ===
- (Germany) Fabian Böhm (2010–2011)
- (Germany) Sven-Sören Christophersen (2010–2014)
- (Germany) Paul Drux (2011–)
- (Germany) Simon Ernst (2018–2021)
- (Germany) Steffen Fäth (2016–2018)
- (Germany) Rico Göde (2008–2010)
- (Germany) Silvio Heinevetter (2009–2020)
- (Germany) Michael Krieter (2005)
- (Germany) Marian Michalczik (2020–)
- (Germany) Michael Müller (2019–2020)
- (Germany) Carsten Ohle (2005–2008)
- (Germany) Evgeni Pevnov (2011–2013, 2015)
- (Germany) Markus Richwien (2006–2014)
- (Germany) Christian Rose (2005–2006)
- (Germany) Erik Schmidt (2017–2019)
- (Germany) Frank Schumann (2006–2008)
- (Germany) Bernd Seehase (1974–1979, 1983–1984)
- (Germany) Johannes Sellin (2008–2013)
- (Germany) Jens Vortmann (2005–2009)
- (Germany) Fabian Wiede (2009–)
- (Germany) Martin Ziemer (2019–2020)
- (Austria) Konrad Wilczynski (2006–2011)
- (Bosnia and Herzegovina) Faruk Vražalić (2015–2016)
- (Croatia) Jakov Gojun (2015–2021)
- (Croatia) Marko Kopljar (2017–)
- (Croatia) Krešimir Kozina (2016–2017)
- (Croatia) Stipe Mandalinić (2017–2020)
- (Croatia) Ivan Ninčević (2010–2013)
- (Croatia) (Germany) Zvonimir Serdarušić (1981–1984)
- (Croatia) Denis Špoljarić (2010–2017)
- (Croatia) Igor Vori (2022)
- (Croatia) Drago Vuković (2015–2018)
- (Croatia) Manuel Štrlek (2024)
- (Czech Republic) Michal Brůna (2009)
- (Czech Republic) Pavel Horák (2013–2015)
- (Czech Republic) Pavel Prokopec (2005–2008)
- (Czech Republic) Petr Štochl (2006–2018)
- (Denmark) Lasse Andersson (2020–)
- (Denmark) Mathias Gidsel (2022–)
- (Denmark) Jacob Holm (2018–2023)
- (Denmark) Johan Koch (2018–2022)
- (Denmark) Torsten Laen (2009–2013)
- (Denmark) Hans Lindberg (2016–2024)
- (Denmark) Kasper Nielsen (2014)
- (Egypt) Hany El-Fakharany (2007–2009)
- (Iceland) Bjarki Már Elísson (2015–2019)
- (Iceland) Rúnar Kárason (2009–2011)
- (Japan) Kohei Narita (2014–2015)
- (Latvia) Dainis Krištopāns (2020)
- (Latvia) (Iceland) Alexander Petersson (2010–2012)
- (Lithuania) Andrius Stelmokas (2006–2008)
- (Montenegro) (Austria) Janko Božović (2007–2008)
- (Montenegro) Miloš Vujović (2020–2023)
- (Netherlands) Mark Bult (2007–2013)
- (Norway) Børge Lund (2012–2013)
- (Norway) Kjetil Strand (2007–2010)
- (Norway) Kent Robin Tønnesen (2015–2017)
- (Norway) Stian Vatne (2009–2011)
- (Poland) Bartłomiej Jaszka (2007–2016)
- (Poland) Michał Kubisztal (2007–2011)
- (Russia) Konstantin Igropulo (2012–2015)
- (Russia) Viktor Kireyev (2022–2024)
- (Slovenia) Mark Ferjan (2015–2017)
- (Spain) Ignacio Plaza Jiménez (2015–2018)
- (Spain) Viran Morros (2021–2022)
- (Spain) Iker Romero (2011–2015)
- (Serbia) Mijajlo Marsenić (2018–)
- (Serbia) Dejan Milosavljev (2019–)
- (Serbia) Draško Nenadić (2017)
- (Serbia) Petar Nenadić (2014–2017)
- (Sweden) Valter Chrintz (2020–)
- (Sweden) Max Darj (2022–)
- (Sweden) Jesper Nielsen (2013–2016)
- (Sweden) Fredrik Petersen (2013–2015)
- (Sweden) Jonathan Stenbäcken (2011–2012)
- (Sweden) Mattias Zachrisson (2013–2019)
- (Tunisia) Wael Jallouz (2018)

=== Former coaches ===
Seasons	Coach	Country
2005–2009	Jörn-Uwe Lommel	(Germany)
2009–2015	Dagur Sigurðsson	(Iceland)
2015–2016	Erlingur Richardsson	(Iceland)
2016–2020	Velimir Petković	(Bosnia and Herzegovina)
2020	Michael Roth	(Germany)
2020–2025	Jaron Siewert	(Germany)
2025–	Nicolej Krickau	(Denmark)

== See also ==
- Sport in Berlin
