= Jaron Siewert =

German handball coach (born 1994)

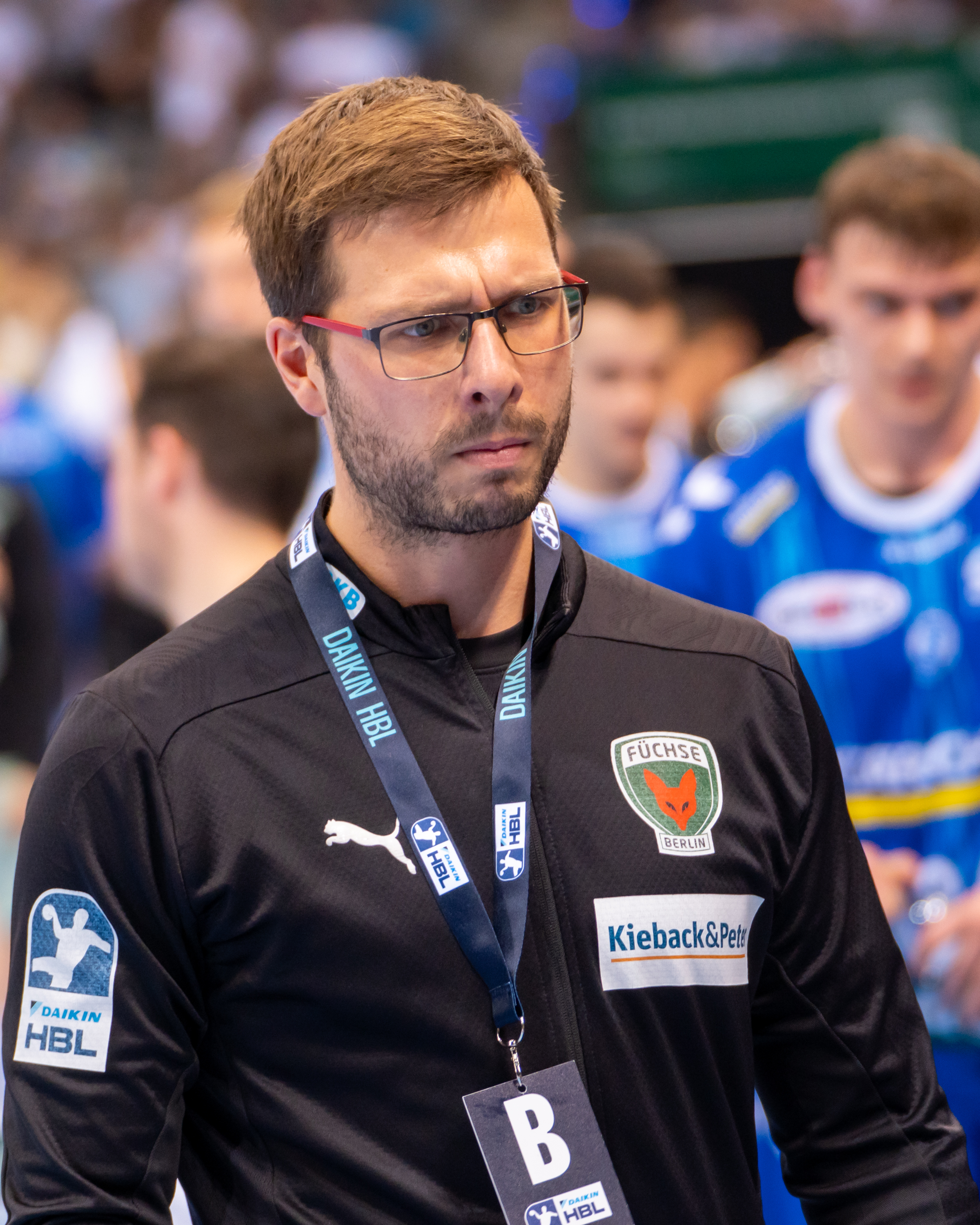
- Jaron Siewert in 2025

Personal information
- Nationality: German
- Born: 31 January 1994 (age 32) Berlin, Germany
- Height: 1.82 m (6 ft 0 in)

Sport
- Sport: Handball
- Position: Centre back
- Current club: Without club

Youth career
- Years: Team
- -2013: Füchse Berlin

Senior clubs
- Years: Team
- 2013-?: Füchse Berlin

Teams managed
- 2013-2017: Füchse Berlin (youth)
- 2015-2017: Germany youth, assistant
- 2017-2020: TUSEM Essen
- 2020-2025: Füchse Berlin

Jaron Siewert (born 31 January 1994) is a German handball coach and former player.

== Playing career ==
Jaron Siewert played his entire playing career at Füchse Berlin. In the 2013/14 season he played for the 2nd team in the 3. liga. Due to injuries in the first team squad he made his debut in this season. He made his debut in February 2013 against Pick Szeged in the EHF Champions League.

With the German youth team he won the 2012 European Men's U-18 Handball Championship.

He retired already at 20 in order to focus on becoming a coach.

== Coaching career ==
=== Youth coach ===
From November 2015 he was a youth coach at the German Handball Federation for the 2000-2001 generation. Meanwhile he was also the youth coach at Füchse Berlin.

=== Essen ===
In 2017 at the age of 23 he became the head coach at the 2nd Bundesliga team TUSEM Essen. Under his leadership the team was promoted in 2020 to the Bundesliga.

=== Back at Füchse Berlin ===
The following season he was named the head coach of Füchse Berlin. In 2023 he won the European League, beating Spanish BM Granollers in the final.

In the 2024-25 season he won the first Bundesliga in club history. At 31 this made him the youngest Bundesliga winning coach ever. He was at the same occasion named coach of the year in the Bundesliga. Despite the success, he was fired just two matches into the following season along with sporting director Stefan Kretzschmar after a public disagreement with managing director Bob Hanning. He was replaced by Danish coach Nicolej Krickau.
