= Mijajlo Marsenić =

Serbian handball player (born 1993)

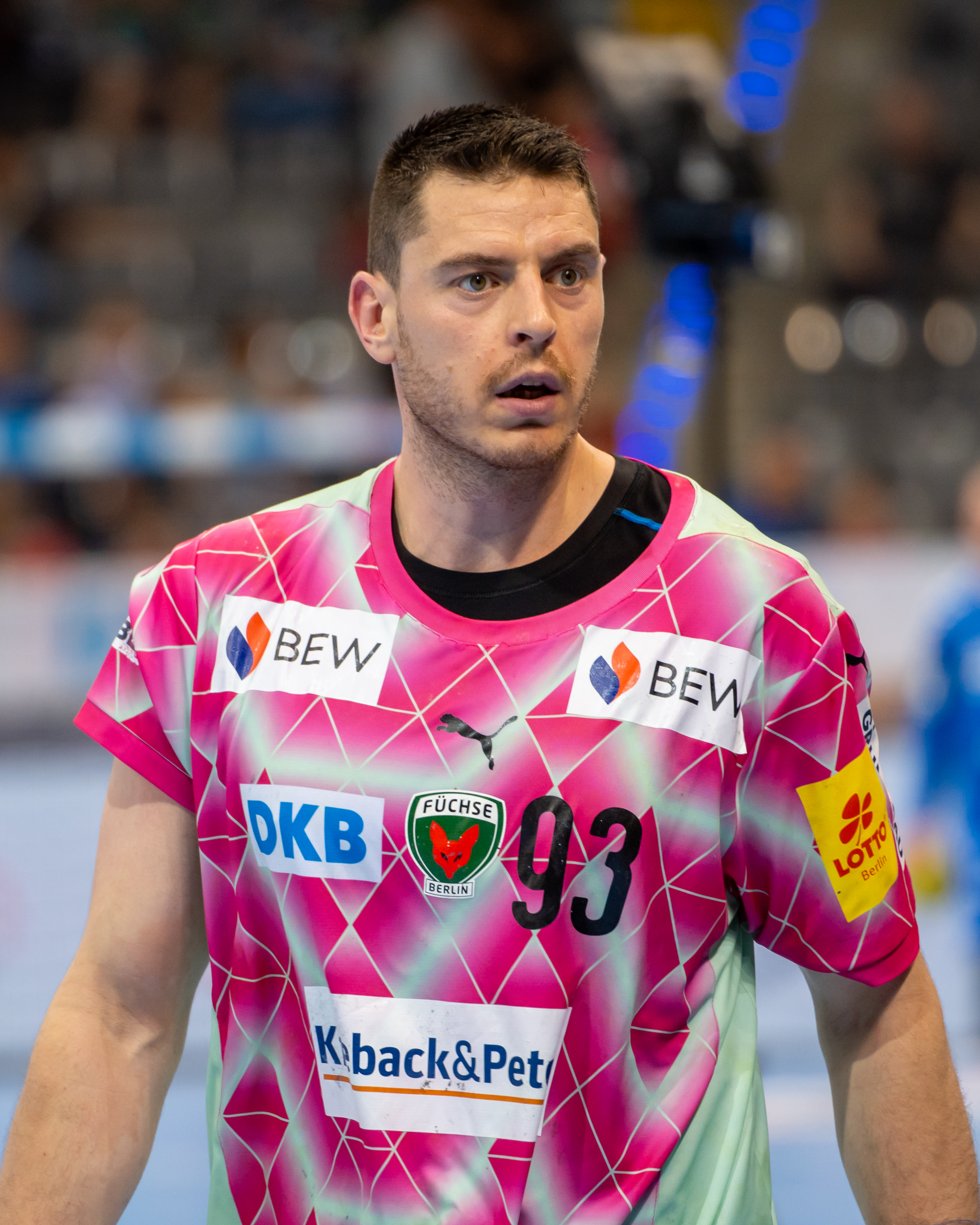
- Marsenić in 2025

Personal information
- Full name: Mijajlo Marsenić
- Nationality: Serbian
- Born: 9 March 1993 (age 33) Berane, Montenegro, FR Yugoslavia
- Height: 2.03 m (6 ft 8 in)

Sport
- Sport: Handball
- Position: Pivot
- Current club: Füchse Berlin
- Number: 93

Youth career
- Years: Team
- –: Berane

Senior clubs
- Years: Team
- 2010–2014: Partizan
- 2014–2015: Metalurg Skopje
- 2015: Partizan
- 2015–2018: Vardar
- 2018–present: Füchse Berlin
National team
Years	Team	Apps	(Gls)
2012–present	Serbia	99	(285)
- Updated on 29 December 2022

Mijajlo Marsenić (Serbian Cyrillic: Мијајло Марсенић; born 9 March 1993) is a Serbian handball player for Füchse Berlin. He also represents the Serbian national team.

== Club career ==
After playing for his hometown club Berane, Marsenić joined Partizan in September 2010. He spent four years at the club and won two consecutive championships. Between 2015 and 2018, Marsenić played for Macedonian club Vardar and helped them win the 2016–17 EHF Champions League. He also won the 2017 and 2018 SEHA League.

In 2018 he joined German Füchse Berlin. Here he won the 2022–23 EHF European League. The year after he won the 2024-25 Handball-Bundesliga, which was the first in club history. The same season he played in the 2024-25 EHF Champions League final, where Füchse lost to league rivals SC Magdeburg.

== International career ==
A Serbia international since 2012, Marsenić participated in two World Championships (2013 and 2019) and five European Championships (2016, 2018, 2020, 2022 and 2024).

== Honours ==
Partizan

- Handball League of Serbia: 2010–11, 2011–12

Vardar

- Macedonian Handball Super League: 2015–16, 2016–17, 2017–18
- Macedonian Handball Cup: 2015–16, 2016–17, 2017–18
- EHF Champions League: 2016–17
- SEHA League: 2016–17, 2017–18

Füchse Berlin

- EHF European League: 2022–23
- Handball-Bundesliga: 2024-25
