= Mattias Zachrisson =

Swedish handball player (born 1990)

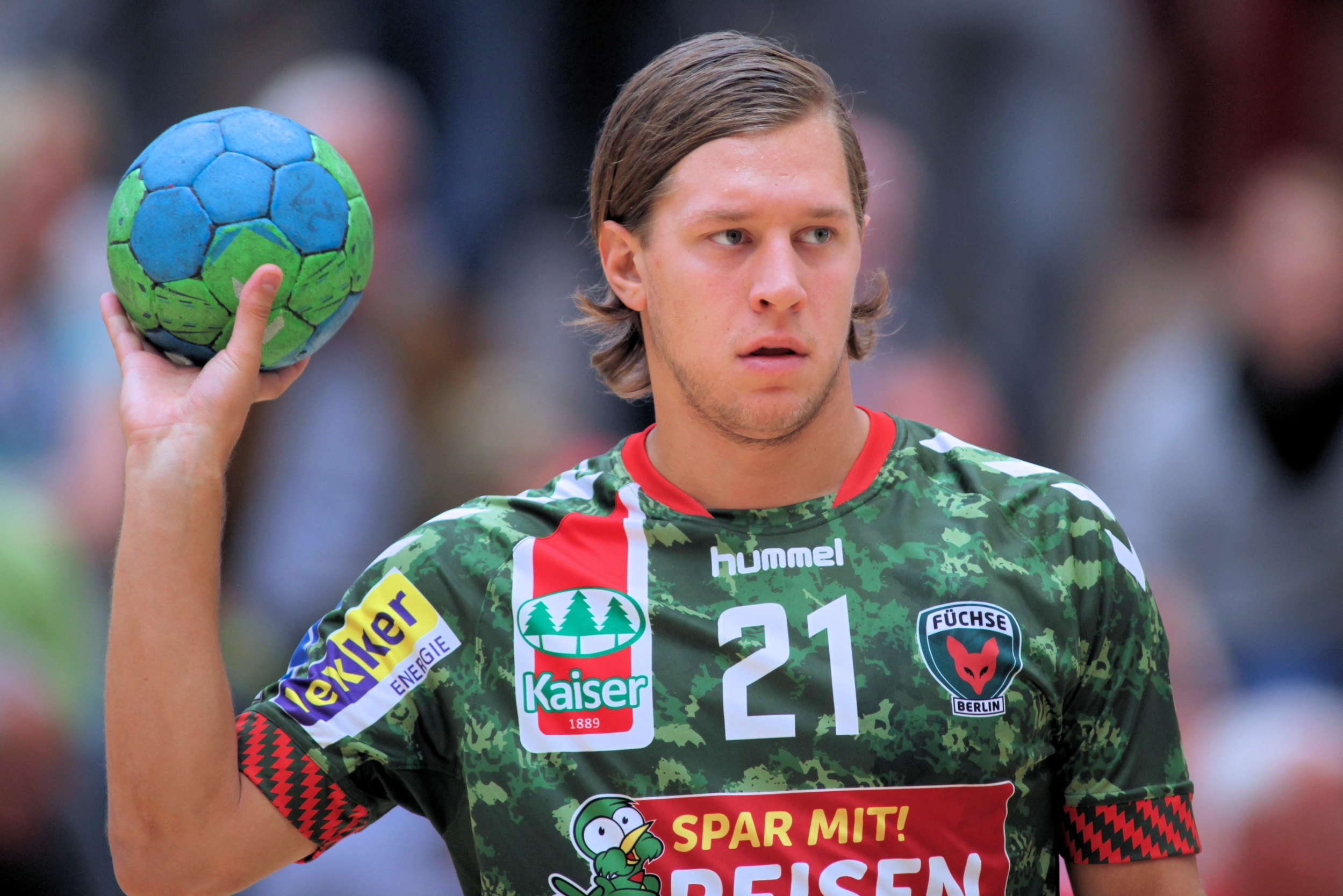

Personal information
- Nationality: Swedish
- Born: 22 August 1990 (age 36) Huddinge, Sweden
- Height: 1.78 m (5 ft 10 in)

Sport
- Sport: Handball
- Position: Right wing
National team
Years	Team	Apps	(Gls)
–	Sweden	127	(306)
Medal record
Olympic Games
Silver medal – second place	2012 London	Team
European Championship
Silver medal – second place	2018 Croatia

Mattias Zachrisson (born 22 August 1990) is a Swedish former handball who played for Füchse Berlin and the Swedish national team.

He has competed at the 2012 Summer Olympics, where Sweden has got to the final.
