= Nicolej Krickau =

Danish handball coach and former player (born 1986)

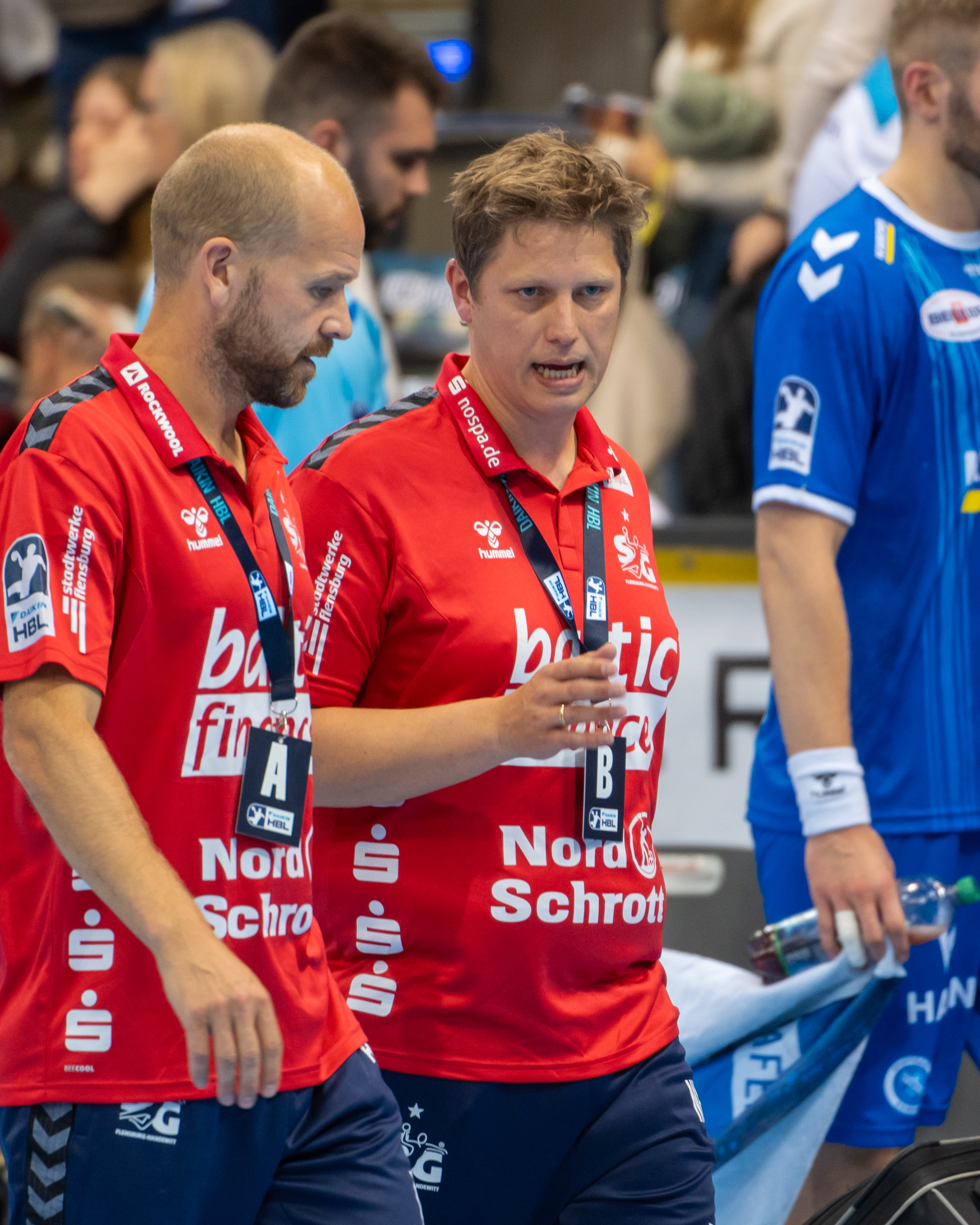
- Krickau (right) in 2024 during a match against TVB Stuttgart

Personal information
- Full name: Nicolej Møldrup Krickau
- Nationality: Danish
- Born: 13 November 1986 (age 39) Horsens, Denmark

Sport
- Sport: Handball
- Position: Playmaker
- Current club: Füchse Berlin

Youth career
- Years: Team
- –: Brabrand IF

Senior clubs
- Years: Team
- 2004–2007: Skanderborg Håndbold

Teams managed
- 2007–2013: Skanderborg Håndbold (youth)
- 2013–2017: Skanderborg Håndbold
- 2017–2023: GOG Håndbold
- 2023–12/2024: SG Flensburg-Handewitt
- 09/2025–: Füchse Berlin

Nicolej Møldrup Krickau (born 13 November 1986) is a Danish handball coach and former playmaker who is the current head coach of Füchse Berlin.

== Career ==
Krickau started playing handball at Brabrand IF as a playmaker. In 2004 he joined Skanderborg Håndbold. Here he played two seasons in the Danish 2nd division (third tier) and a single season in the Herrehåndboldligaen, the top flight, before he had to retire early because of an injury.

Afterwards he became a coach in the youth team of Skanderborg Håndbold, later serving as assistant coach before becoming head coach in 2013 at the age of 26. After four seasons with mid-table finishes he joined Danish top club GOG Håndbold on a three-year deal. Here he won bronze medals in his first season and the Cup in his second season. In the 2021–22 season he won the Danish championship, the first for the club since 2007. In the 2022–23 season he once again won the Danish championship as well as the cup. The same year he was named Danish coach of the year.

He then left GOG for German club SG Flensburg-Handewitt due to a release clause. Here he signed a three-year deal with the Bundesliga club. He won the 2023–24 EHF European League. In December 2024 he was fired by Flensburg-Handewitt after losing 4 of the first 14 matches in the season.

In September 2025 he became the head coach of reigning Bundesliga champions Füchse Berlin, replacing Jaron Siewert.

== Private life ==
He has a degree in communication from the Danish School of Media and Journalism.
