= Silvio Heinevetter =

German handball player (born 1984)

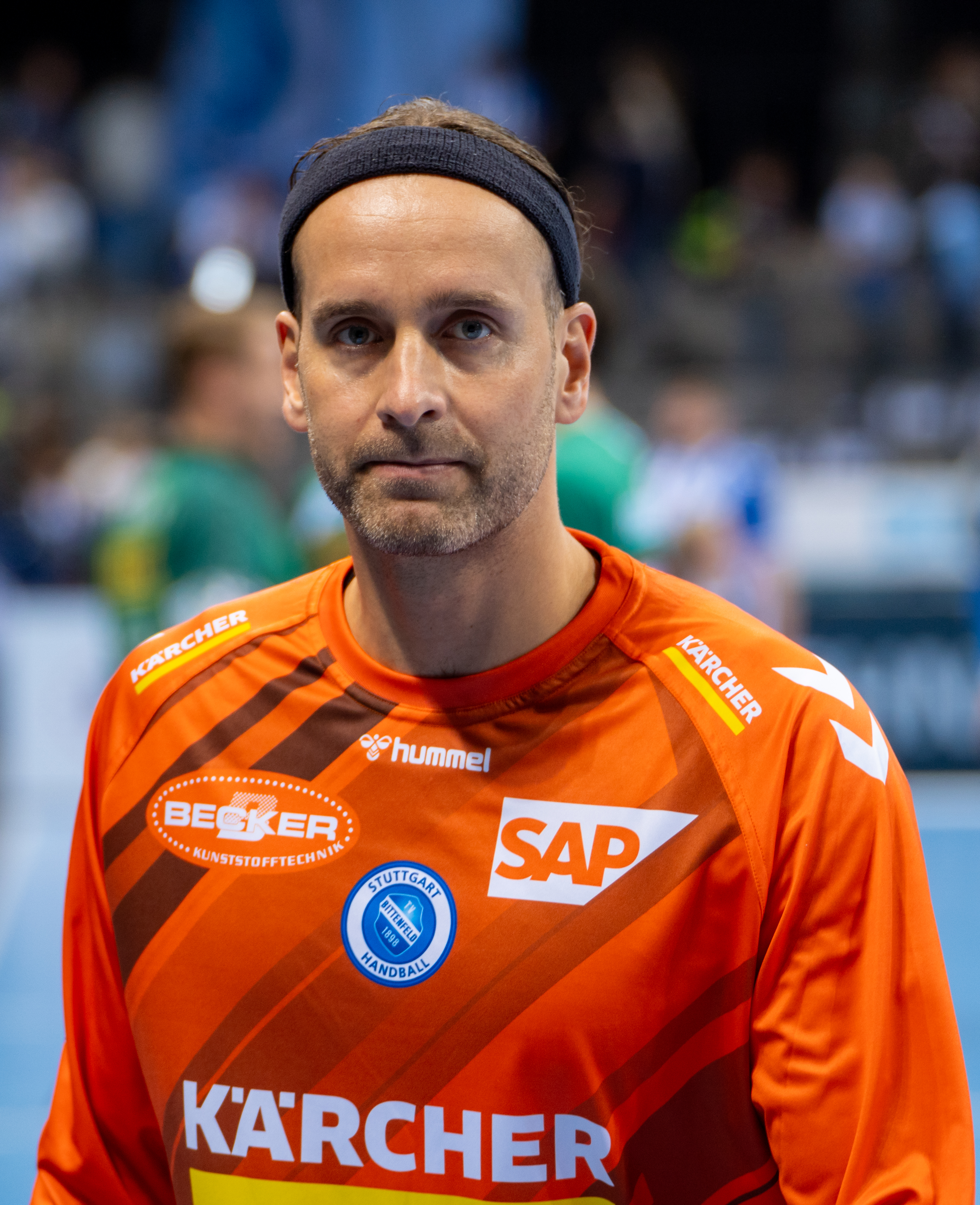
- Heinevetter in 2024

Personal information
- Nationality: German
- Born: 21 October 1984 (age 41) Bad Langensalza, East Germany
- Height: 1.94 m (6 ft 4 in)

Sport
- Sport: Handball
- Position: Goalkeeper
- Current club: TVB 1898 Stuttgart
- Number: 12

Youth career
- Years: Team
- –: SV Empor Bad Langensalza
- –: THC Erfurt-Bad Langensalza

Senior clubs
- Years: Team
- –2005: Concordia Delitzsch
- 2005–2009: SC Magdeburg
- 2009–2020: Füchse Berlin
- 2020–2022: MT Melsungen
- 2022–: TVB 1898 Stuttgart
National team
Years	Team	Apps	(Gls)
2006–2021	Germany	206	(3)
Medal record
Olympic Games
Bronze medal – third place	2016 Rio de Janeiro	Team
- Updated on 2. January 2024

Silvio Heinevetter (born 21 October 1984) is a German handballer for TVB 1898 Stuttgart.

He participated at the 2019 World Men's Handball Championship.

== Achievements ==
- Summer Olympics:
  - Bronze: 2016
