= Paul Drux =

German handball player (born 1995)

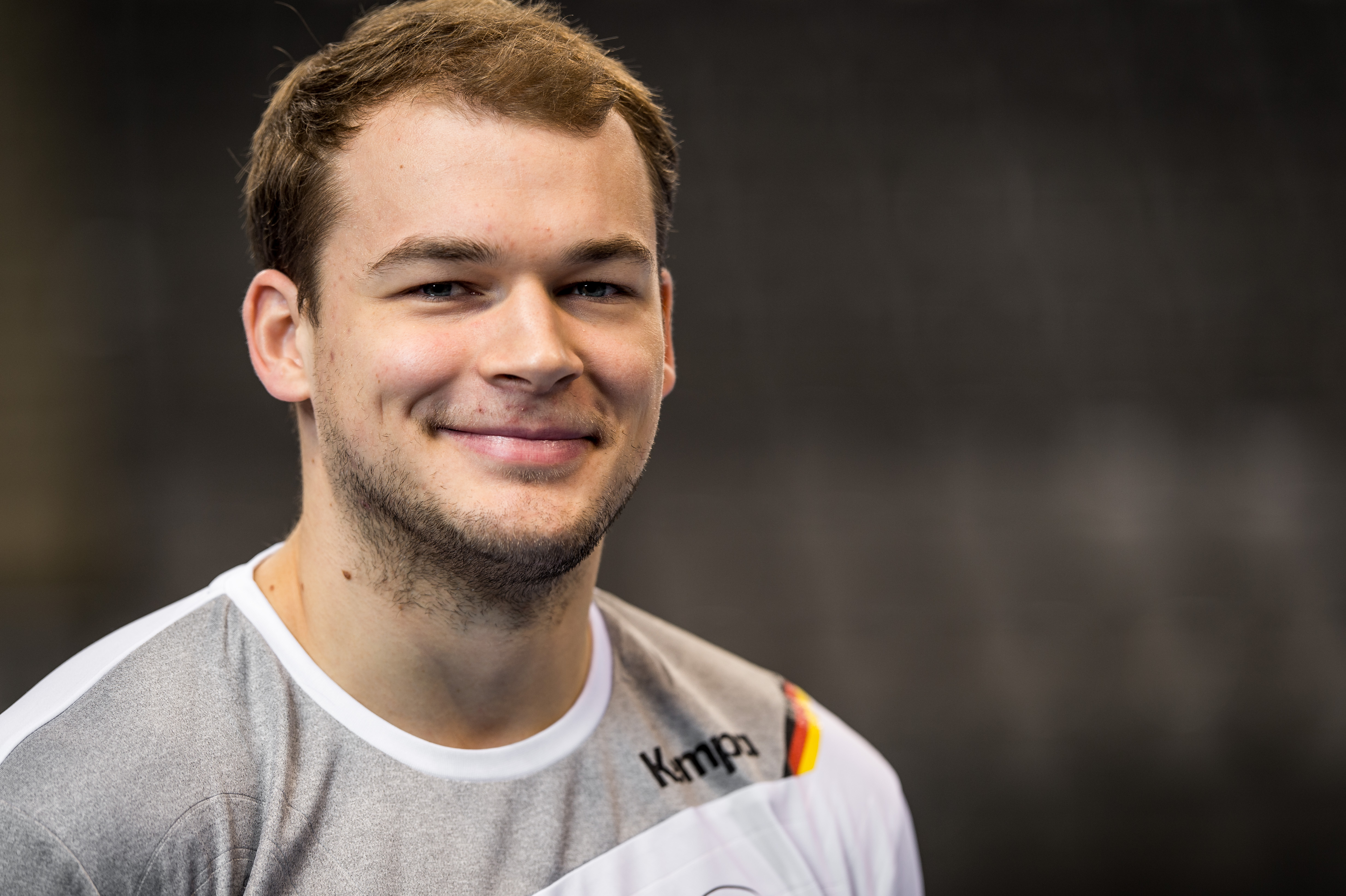
- Drux in 2018

Personal information
- Nationality: German
- Born: 7 February 1995 (age 31) Gummersbach, Germany
- Height: 1.92 m (6 ft 4 in)

Sport
- Sport: Handball
- Position: Left back/Center back

Youth career
- Years: Team
- 2000–2007: SSV Marienheide
- 2007–2011: VfL Gummersbach
- 2011–2014: Füchse Berlin

Senior clubs
- Years: Team
- 2012–2024: Füchse Berlin
National team
Years	Team	Apps	(Gls)
2014–2024	Germany	127	(214)
Medal record
Olympic Games
Bronze medal – third place	2016 Rio de Janeiro	Team
- Updated on 2. July 2023

Paul Drux (born 7 February 1995) is a German former handball player.

He participated at the 2019 World Men's Handball Championship.

== Achievements ==
- Summer Olympics:
  - Bronze: 2016
