= Sven-Sören Christophersen =

German handball player (born 1985)

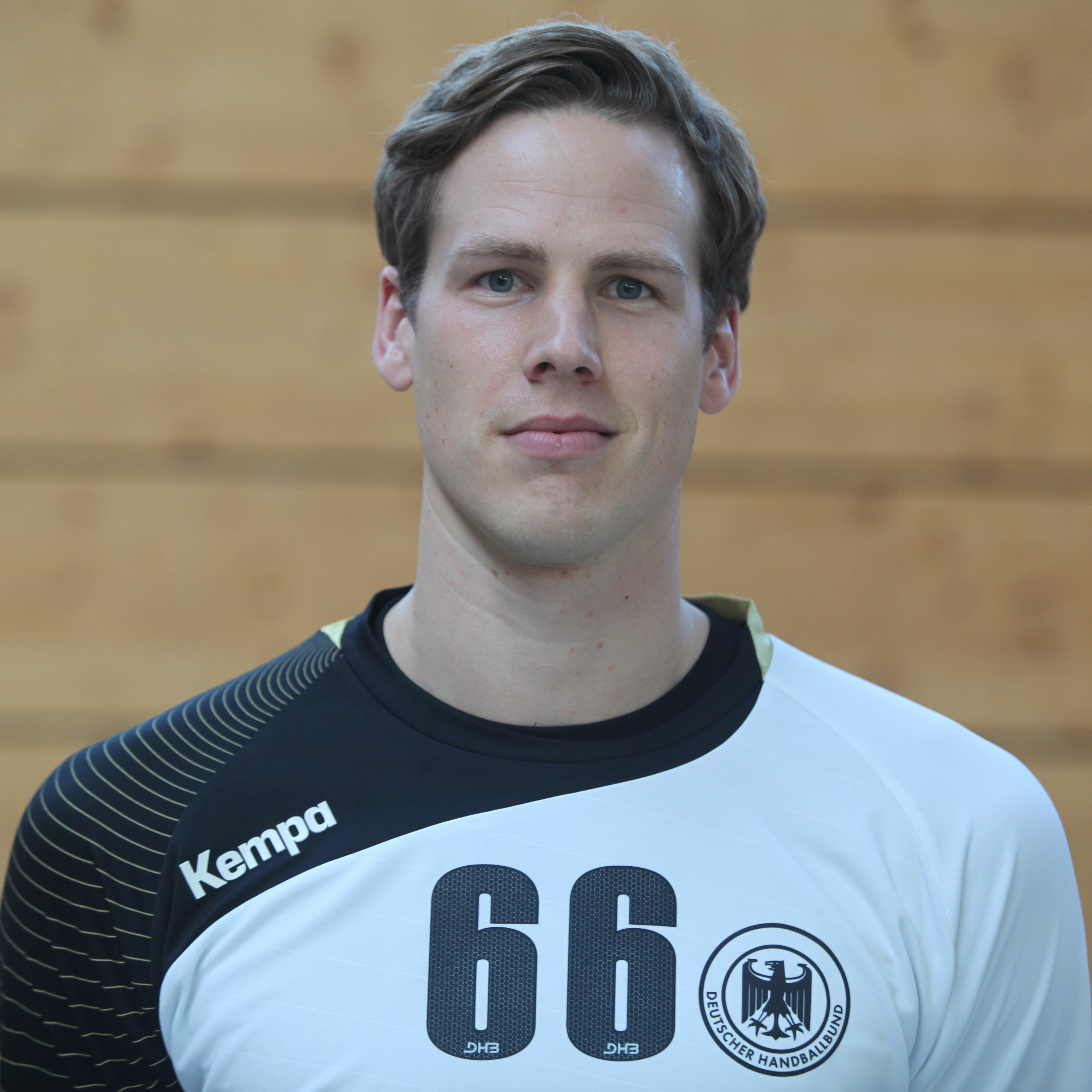
- Christophersen in 2014

Personal information
- Nationality: German
- Born: 9 May 1985 (age 41) Lübeck, West Germany
- Height: 1.98 m (6 ft 6 in)

Sport
- Sport: Handball
- Position: Left back

Senior clubs
- Years: Team
- 2003–2006: TBV Lemgo
- 2006–2007: Eintracht Hildesheim
- 2007–2008: TBV Lemgo
- 2008: Wilhelmshavener HV
- 2008–2010: HSG Wetzlar
- 2010–2014: Füchse Berlin
- 2014–2018: TSV Hannover-Burgdorf
National team
Years	Team	Apps	(Gls)
2006–2016	Germany	101	(182)

Sven-Sören Christophersen (born 9 May 1985) is a former German handball player. He competed at the 2008 Summer Olympics in Beijing, where the German team placed 9th.
