= Erik Schmidt (handballer) =

German handball player (born 1992)

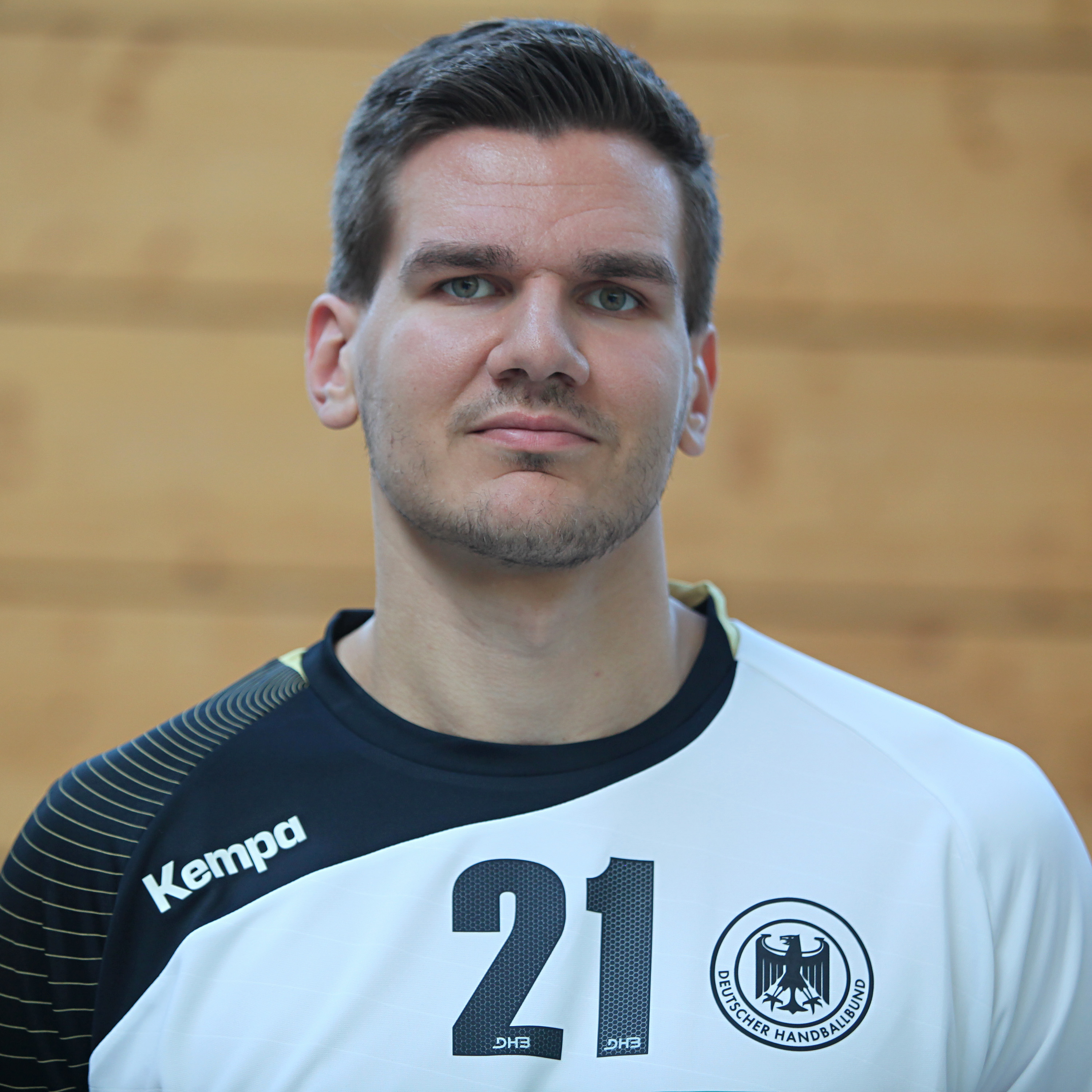
- Schmidt on September 16, 2014 with the national team

Personal information
- Nationality: German
- Born: 28 December 1992 (age 33) Mainz, Germany
- Height: 2.04 m (6 ft 8 in)

Sport
- Sport: Handball
- Position: Pivot
- Current club: Hapoel Rishon LeZion
- Number: 8

Youth career
- Years: Team
- –: TG 1862 Rüsselsheim
- –: TSG Münster
- –: SG Wallau
- –: TV Großwallstadt

Senior clubs
- Years: Team
- 2010–2012: TV Groß-Umstadt
- 2012–2015: TSG Friesenheim
- 2015–2017: TSV Hannover-Burgdorf
- 2017–2019: Füchse Berlin
- 2019–2020: SC Magdeburg
- 2020–2022: Kadetten Schaffhausen
- 2022–2024: HSG Wetzlar
- 2024–2026: AEK Athens
- 2026–: Hapoel Rishon LeZion
National team
Years	Team	Apps	(Gls)
2014–	Germany	38	(40)
Medal record
European Championship
Gold medal – first place	2016 Poland
- Updated on 23 August 2024

Erik Schmidt (born 28 December 1992) is a German handball player for AEK Athens and the German national team.

== Career ==
Schmidt began playing handball TG 1862 Rüsselheim. He then played for TSG Münster, SG Wallau and TV Großwallstadt at youth levels. His senior debut began at TV Groß-Umstadt on the 3. Liga. In 2012 he joined the 2. Bundesliga team TSG Friesenheim. In the 2013-14 season he was promoted to the Bundesliga. In 2015 he joined TSV Hannover-Burgdorf. In 2017-18 he joined Füchse Berlin, after signing a three year deal in May 2016. Here he won the EHF Cup in 2018. In 2019 he joined SC Magdeburg. A season later he joined Kadetten Schaffhausen in Switzerland. Here he won the Swiss championship in 2022.

In 2022 he returned to Germany and joined HSG Wetzlar. After his three year contract ran out, he joined Greek side AEK Athens in 2024. In January 2026, Schmidt joined Hapoel Rischon LeZion.

=== National team ===
On 20 September 2014 Schmidt debuted for the German national team in a friendly against Switzerland.

At the 2016 European Championship he won gold medals with the German team, beting Spain in the final 24:17.

He was also part of the german team at the 2018 European Championship.

== Achievements ==
- European Championship:
  - Gold: 2016
- EHF Cup:
  - Gold: 2018
- Swiss Championship
  - Gold: 2022
