= Johan Koch =

Danish handball player (born 1990)

Personal information
- Nationality: Danish
- Born: 29 November 1990 (age 35) Svendborg, Denmark
- Height: 1.90 m (6 ft 3 in)

Sport
- Sport: Handball
- Position: Pivot

Senior clubs
- Years: Team
- –2010: GOG Svendborg TGI
- 2010–2013: IFK Kristianstad
- 2013–2015: TV Emsdetten
- 2015–2018: Kadetten Schaffhausen
- 2018–2022: Füchse Berlin
- 2022: HC Kriens-Luzern

Johan Koch (born 29 November 1990) is a Danish retired handball player.

He made his senior debut for GOG Svendborg TGI. When the club went bankrupt and was demoted in January 2010, Koch trained and played with Danish lower-league teams for the rest of the season before joining Swedish club IFK Kristianstad in the summer. He helped the team reach the Swedish Championship finals in 2012 and 2013; however, they lost both finals.

After the second final with Kristianstad he joined German newly promoted Bundesliga club TV Emsdetten. He stayed there for two seasons before signing for Swiss club Kadetten Schaffhausen in 2015. He was a member of the squads that won the Swiss Nationalliga A in 2015–16 and 2016–17. In January 2018, Füchse Berlin bought Koch due to injuries at the pivot position. He helped the team win the 2017–18 EHF Cup. After the EHF cup victory he signed a long-term contract with Berlin.
