= Jesper Nielsen =

Swedish handball player (born 1989)

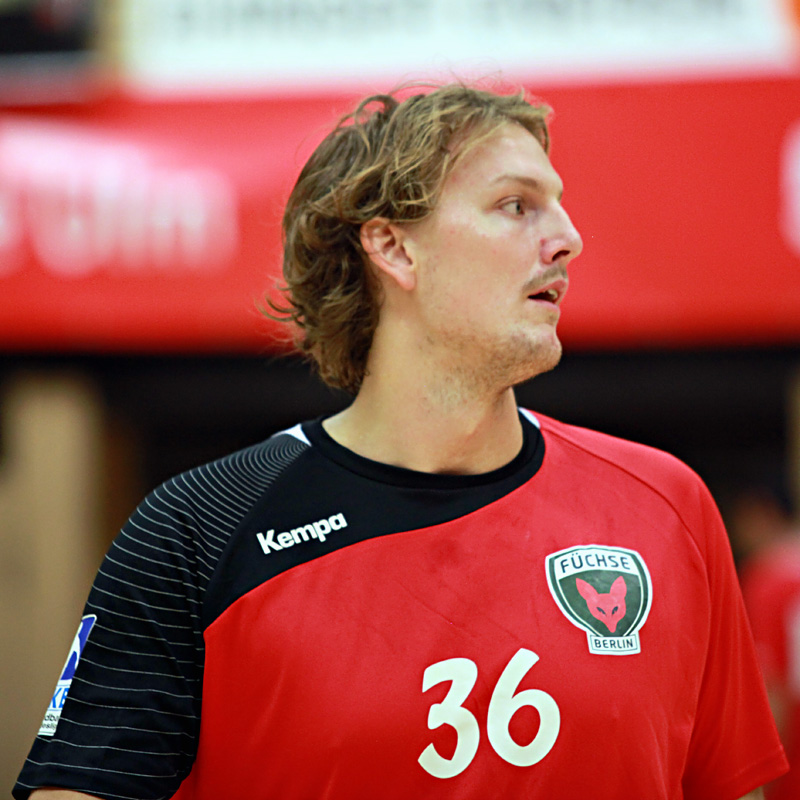

Personal information
- Nationality: Swedish
- Born: 30 September 1989 (age 37) Norrköping, Sweden
- Height: 2.00 m (6 ft 7 in)

Sport
- Sport: Handball
- Position: Pivot
- Current club: Eskilstuna Guif

Senior clubs
- Years: Team
- 2008–2013: IK Sävehof
- 2013–2016: Füchse Berlin
- 2016–2018: Paris Saint-Germain
- 2018–2021: Rhein-Neckar Löwen
- 2021–2024: Aalborg Håndbold
- 2024–: Eskilstuna Guif
National team
Years	Team	Apps	(Gls)
2011–	Sweden	112	(145)
Medal record
European Championship
Silver medal – second place	2018 Croatia
- Updated on 14 August 2024

Jesper Nielsen (born 30 September 1989) is a Swedish handball player for Eskilstuna Guif and the Swedish national team.
