= Mathias Gidsel =

Danish handball player (born 1999)

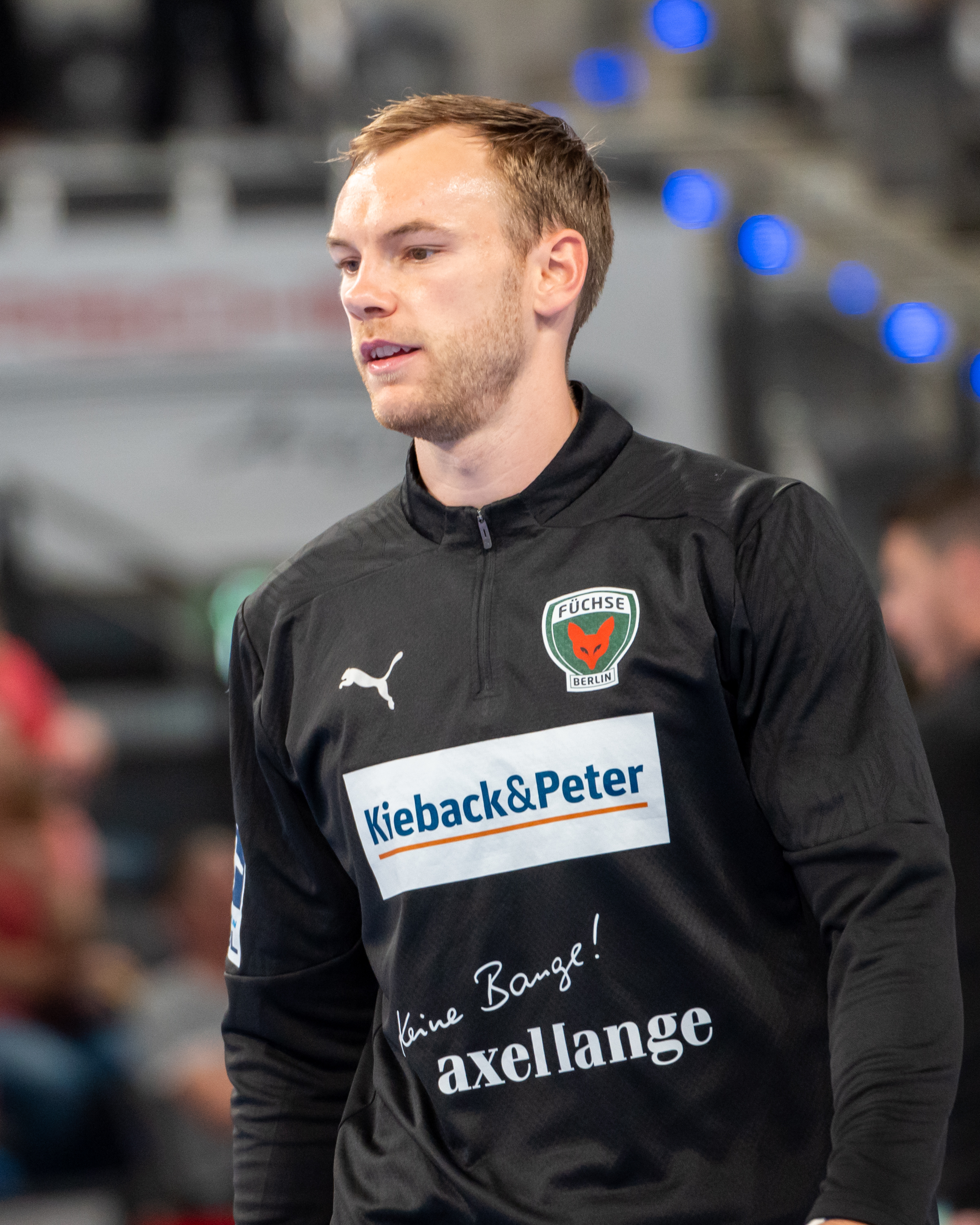
- Gidsel in 2025

Personal information
- Nationality: Danish
- Born: 8 February 1999 (age 27) Skjern, Denmark
- Height: 1.90 m (6 ft 3 in)

Sport
- Sport: Handball
- Position: Right back
- Current club: Füchse Berlin
- Number: 19

Youth career
- Years: Team
- –2014: Skjern Håndbold
- 2014–2017: GOG Håndbold

Senior clubs
- Years: Team
- 2017–2022: GOG Håndbold
- 2022–: Füchse Berlin
National team
Years	Team	Apps	(Gls)
2020–	Denmark	109	(676)
Medal record
Olympic Games
Gold medal – first place	2024 Paris	Team
Silver medal – second place	2020 Tokyo	Team
World Championship
Gold medal – first place	2021 Egypt
Gold medal – first place	2023 Poland/Sweden
Gold medal – first place	2025 Croatia/Denmark/Norway
European Championship
Gold medal – first place	2026 Denmark/Norway/Sweden
Silver medal – second place	2024 Germany
Bronze medal – third place	2022 Hungary/Slovakia
Youth World Championship
Bronze medal – third place	2017 Georgia
- Updated on 21 March 2026

Mathias Gidsel (born 8 February 1999) is a Danish professional handball player who plays as a right back for Füchse Berlin and the Danish national team. He is considered one of the best players of all time and is the first player to win the IHF World Player of the Year award three years in a row (2023, 2024, 2025), a three-time IHF World Champion (2021, 2023, 2025), and an Olympic gold medalist (2024). At the 2025 World Championship, he was named MVP and top scorer with 74 goals, helping extend Denmark's streak to four consecutive titles. Renowned for his exceptional shooting efficiency, high-volume scoring, and extraordinary stamina, Gidsel has been described as a "machine" by peers and coaches.

== Early life ==
Gidsel attended Oure Efterskole at the age of 15, where he focused on developing his handball skills. Although he initially planned to stay for one year, he remained for five years, during which he attracted the attention of Danish club GOG Håndbold.

== Career ==
=== GOG Håndbold ===
Gidsel joined GOG Håndbold in 2014 while still attending Oure Efterskole. In 2017, he was promoted to the first team, where he established himself as a key player. He finished as runner-up in the Danish Championship on two occasions. When he played youth handball, several coaches had concerns about his size, and suggested retraining him to a wing-player. He did however continue as a back.

In 2021, he was awarded Årets Fund (Breakthrough of the Year), a prize given by the National Olympic Committee and Sports Confederation of Denmark, Team Danmark, and Politiken. He became the first handball player to receive the award since 1957.

In January 2022, Gidsel suffered a knee ligament injury that kept him out for most of the season. He returned in May and contributed to GOG winning the 2021–22 Danish Championship.

=== Füchse Berlin ===
After debuting for the Danish national team, he joined German side Füchse Berlin, where he signed a contract until 2028 with the club. With the club, he won the 2022/23 EHF European League. In the 2023–24 Bundesliga season, he scored the second-most goals overall with 263, but the most excluding penalties. In 2025, he extended his contract until 2029. The same year, he was named IHF World Player of the Year for the second time in his career. In the 2024–25 season, he broke the record for most open-play goals scored in a single Bundesliga season with 264 goals. That season, he won the 2024–25 Handball-Bundesliga, which was the first in club history. The same season, he played in the 2024–25 EHF Champions League final, where Füchse lost to league rivals SC Magdeburg. In 2025 he was named the Danish Sports Name of the Year, which was the first time a handball player won it as an individual. In 2026 he was named IHF Player of the year, and became the first player ever to win the award three times in a row.

In August 2026 he reached 1,000 goals in the Bundesliga, becoming the second fastest player to do so after Polish Jerzy Klempel.

He plays in number 19 because of his admiration of the French player Luc Abalo.

=== National team ===
Gidsel debuted for the Danish national team on 7 November 2020 against Finland, where he scored 3 goals. His first major tournament was at the 2021 World Cup where he became a world champion with the Danish team. His first match at a major tournament was against Bahrain, where he scored 10 goals, which was the record for the most goals for a major tournament debutant ever for the Danish national team, although he did only hold the record for 6 days when Emil Manfeldt Jakobsen scored 12 against Japan. In that tournament, he was included in the All Star team and the Danish handball expert Lars Krogh Jeppesen called him the best Danish player at the tournament.

At the 2020 Olympics in Tokyo, Gidsel won the MVP award, while winning silver medals with the Danish team.

He won gold medals at the 2023 World Championship with the Danish team. He was the top scorer at the tournament with 60 goals.

At 2024 European Championship he was the joint top scorer together with Portugal's Martim Costa with 54 goals, and was in the all star team. Denmark did however only win silver medals, losing to France in the final after extra time.

At the 2024 Olympics he won Olympic gold with the Danish team and won the MVP once again. Additionally he was the top scorer with 62 goals, which is the record for most goals at an Olympic tournament, beating the record of his teammate Mikkel Hansen.

At the 2025 World Championship he won his third World Championship gold medal in a row, and was top scorer at the tournament.

At the 2026 European Men's Handball Championship he won gold medals, meaning that Denmark held both the World, European and Olympic titles at the same time, as only the second team ever after France's 'Les Experts'. He was selected to tournament MVP, and was the top scorer with 68 goals. This was the most goals for a single player at any European Championship, taking the record from Norwegian Sander Sagosen. He also played the most minutes at the tournament and had the second most assists with 56.

== Honours ==
- German League:
  - Winner: 2025
- Danish League:
  - Winner: 2022
- Danish Cup:
  - Winner: 2019
- DHB-Pokal
  - Winner: 2026
- EHF European League:
  - Winner: 2023
- DHB-Supercup:
  - Winner: 2024, 2025

Individual awards

- IHF World Player of the Year – Men: 2023, 2024, 2025
- All-Star Right back of the World Championship: 2021
- All-Star Right back of the European Championship: 2022, 2024
- Most Valuable Player (MVP) of the Olympic Games: 2020, 2024
- Most Valuable Player (MVP) of the World Championship: 2023, 2025
- Most Valuable Player (MVP) of the European Championship: 2026
- Top Scorer at the Olympic Games: 2024
- Top Scorer at the World Championship: 2023 (60 goals), 2025 (74 goals)
- Top Scorer at the European Championship: 2024 (54 goals), 2026 (68 goals)
- Handball-Planet – Best young player in the world: 2021
- Top Goalscorer of the EHF Champions League: 2025
- Danish Player of the year: 2021
- Danish National team Player of the year: 2022
- EHF Excellence Awards MVP: Season 2024/25
- EHF Excellence Awards Best right back of the season: Season 2022/23, 2024/25
- Handball-Planet – Best World Handball Player: 2023, 2024
- The One Upskill Handball – World Best Player: 2024
- Bundesliga MVP: 2025, 2026
- Danish Sports Name of the Year: 2025

== League statistics ==
Season	Club	League	GP	Goals	7-Meter	OPG
2017–18	GOG Håndbold	Håndboldligaen	4	4	0/0 (-%)	4
2018–19	GOG Håndbold	Håndboldligaen	34	28	0/0 (-%)	28
2019–20	GOG Håndbold	Håndboldligaen	24	51	0/0 (-%)	51
2020–21	GOG Håndbold	Håndboldligaen	35	173	3/3 (100%)	170
2021–22	GOG Håndbold	Håndboldligaen	22	116	1/1 (100%)	115
2022–23	Füchse Berlin	Bundesliga	26	139	0/0 (-%)	139
2023–24	Füchse Berlin	Bundesliga	34	263	0/0 (-%)	263
2024–25	Füchse Berlin	Bundesliga	33	274	0/0 (-%)	274
2017–2025	combined	combined	212	1048	4/4 (100%)	1044

Note: Games Played and Goals include Play-offs

== Major tournament statistics ==
Legend
Tnmt	Tournament	GP	Games played	Gls	Goals
Sh	Shots	G%	Goal percentage	7G	7-meter goals
7S	7-meter shots	As	Assists	AG	Assists and Goals
St	Steals	Bl	Blocks	2M	2 Minute Suspensions
RC	Red Cards	Pl	Placement of National Team	**Bold**	Career high
	Led the Tournament		Tournament MVP		On All-Star Team

As of conclusion of 2026 European Men's Handball Championship (February 2026)

Tnmt	GP	Gls	Sh	G%	7G	7S	As	AG	St	Bl	2M	RC	Pl
2021 WC	**9**	39	49	80	0	0	27	66	4	**1**	0	0	1st
2020 OG	8	46	57	81	0	0	34	80	3	**1**	0	0	2nd
2022 EC	7	38	43	**88**	0	0	35	73	3	0	**1**	0	3rd
2023 WC	**9**	60	80	75	0	0	42	102	**9**	0	**1**	0	1st
2024 EC	8	54	66	82	0	0	35	89	5	0	**1**	0	2nd
2024 OG	8	62	83	75	0	0	39	101	5	**1**	**1**	0	1st
2025 WC	**9**	**74**	**107**	69	**1**	**1**	45	119	6	0	**1**	0	1st
2026 EC	**9**	68	95	72	0	0	**56**	**124**	4	0	**1**	0	1st
