= Steffen Fäth =

German handball player (born 1990)

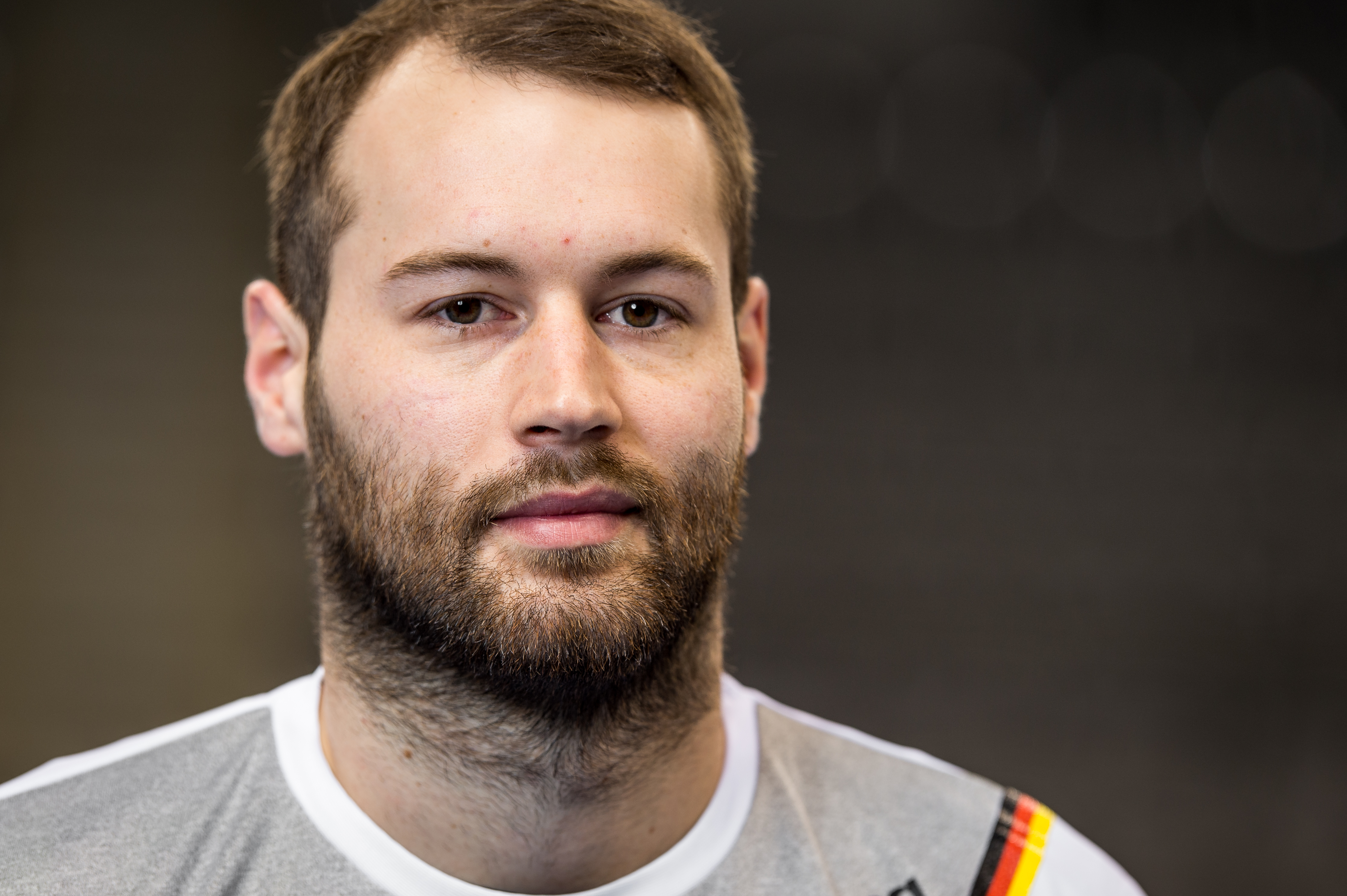
- Fäth in 2018

Personal information
- Nationality: German
- Born: 4 April 1990 (age 36) Frankfurt, West Germany
- Height: 1.95 m (6 ft 5 in)

Sport
- Sport: Handball
- Position: Left back
- Current club: HSG Goldstein/Schwanheim
- Number: 23

Senior clubs
- Years: Team
- –2007: VfL Goldstein
- 2007–2008: SG Wallau-Massenheim
- 2008–2010: Rhein-Neckar Löwen
- 2009–2010: → VfL Gummersbach (loan)
- 2010–2016: HSG Wetzlar
- 2016–2018: Füchse Berlin
- 2018–2020: Rhein-Neckar Löwen
- 2020–2023: HC Erlangen
- 2023–: HSG Goldstein/Schwanheim
National team
Years	Team	Apps	(Gls)
2010–	Germany	79	(168)
Medal record
Olympic Games
Bronze medal – third place	2016 Rio de Janeiro	Team
European Championship
Gold medal – first place	2016 Poland

Steffen Fäth (born 4 April 1990) is a German handball player for HSG Goldstein/Schwanheim and the German national team.

He was part of the German team that won the 2016 European Men's Handball Championship

== Career ==
Fäth made his senior debut for Rhein-Neckar Löwen in the 2008-09 season. In the 2009-10 season, he was loaned out to VfL Gummersbach. After returning from loan, he joined HSG Wetzlar. In his first season, he proved a good goalscorer and debuted for the German national team.

In 2016, he joined Füchse Berlin. Here, he won the IHF Super Globe in 2016 and the EHF Cup in 2018. In 2018, he returned to Rhein-Neckar Löwen.

In 2020, he joined HC Erlangen. On 25 April 2021, he scored his 1000th Bundesliga goal in a game against SC Magdeburg.

In 2023, he joined HSG Goldstein/Schwanheim, the club where he had started his career back in 2007.

=== Season statistics ===
Season	Team	League	Games	Goals	Penalty goals	Outfield goals
2008/09	Rhein-Neckar Löwen	Bundesliga	18	16	1	15
2009/10	VfL Gummersbach	Bundesliga	29	14	0	14
2010/11	HSG Wetzlar	Bundesliga	24	31	5	26
2011/12	HSG Wetzlar	Bundesliga	33	75	0	75
2012/13	HSG Wetzlar	Bundesliga	29	113	10	103
2013/14	HSG Wetzlar	Bundesliga	31	142	12	130
2014/15	HSG Wetzlar	Bundesliga	32	149	8	141
2015/16	HSG Wetzlar	Bundesliga	30	136	0	136
2016/17	Füchse Berlin	Bundesliga	34	82	0	82
2017/18	Füchse Berlin	Bundesliga	28	142	0	142
2018/19	Rhein-Neckar Löwen	Bundesliga	28	56	0	56
2019/20	Rhein-Neckar Löwen	Bundesliga	22	21	0	21
2020/21	HC Erlangen	Bundesliga	20	34	0	34
2021/22	HC Erlangen	Bundesliga	20	23	0	23
2022/23	HC Erlangen	Bundesliga	16	14	0	14
2008–2023	gesamt	Bundesliga	394	1049	36	1013

Source: Player profile at the Handball-Bundesliga

== National team ==
With the German youth national team Fäth won the 2009 Junior World Championship.

At the 2016 European Championship he won Gold medals with the German team, beating Spain in the final 24-17.

At the 2016 Olympics he won bronze medals with the German team. For this he was awarded the Silbernes Lorbeerblatt

He participated at the 2019 World Men's Handball Championship, where Germany finished 4th.

== Achievements ==
- Summer Olympics:
  - Bronze: 2016
- European Championship:
  - Gold: 2016
- EHF Cup:
  - Winner: 2018
- IHF Super Globe:
  - Winner: 2016
- DHB Supercup:
  - Winner: 2018
