= Petr Štochl =

Czech handball player

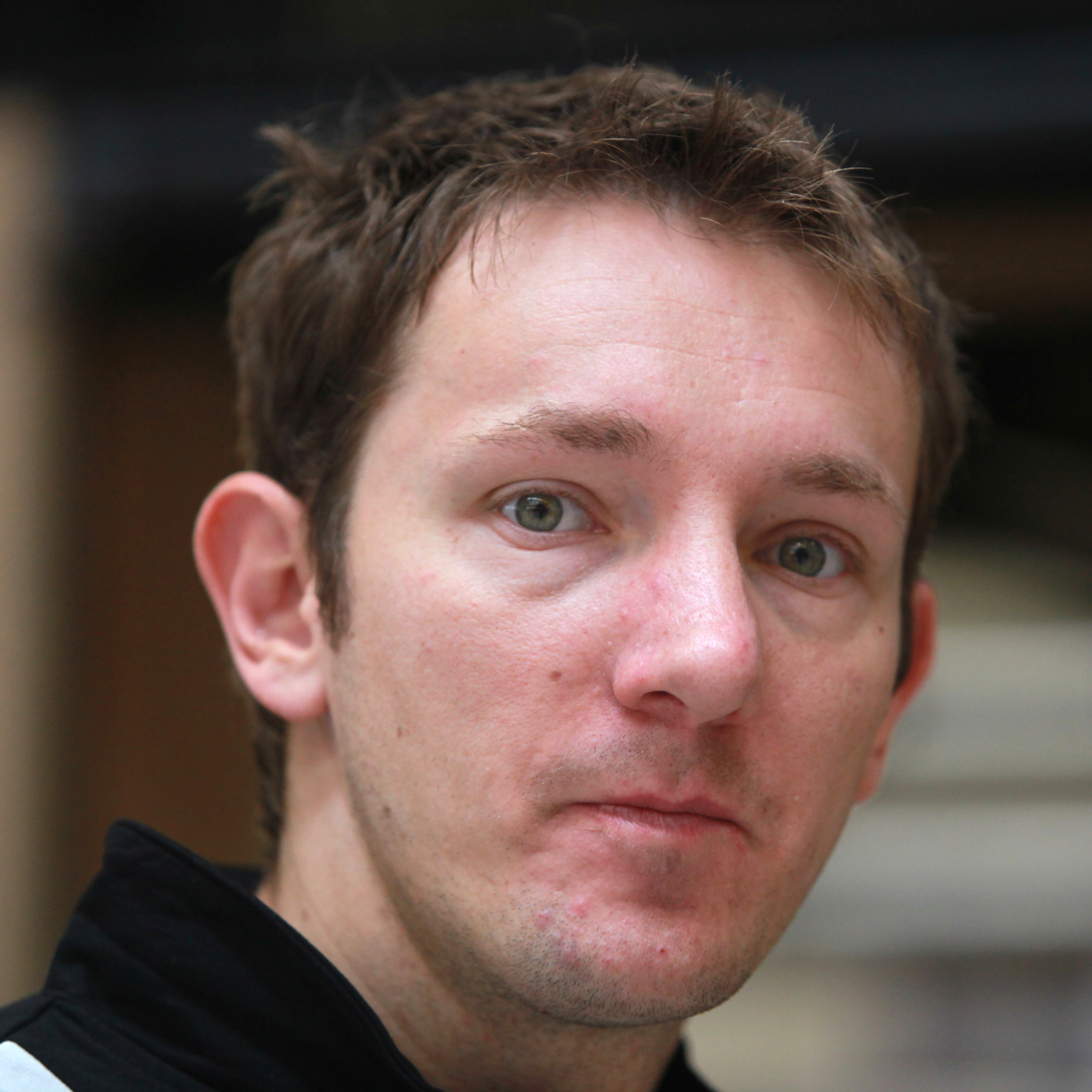

Personal information
- Nationality: Czech
- Born: 24 April 1976 (age 50) Plzeň, Czechoslovakia
- Height: 1.93 m (6 ft 4 in)

Sport
- Sport: Handball
- Position: Goalkeeper
- Current club: Füchse Berlin
- Number: 71
National team
Years	Team	Apps	(Gls)
–	Czech Republic	182	(2)

Petr Štochl (born 24 April 1976) is a Czech handball player for Füchse Berlin and the Czech national team.
