= Kohei Narita =

Japanese handball player (born 1989)

Personal information
- Nationality: Japanese
- Born: 15 June 1989 (age 37)
- Height: 1.90 m (6 ft 3 in)

Sport
- Sport: Handball
- Position: Left wing
- Current club: Wakunaga Leolic
National team
Years	Team	Apps	(Gls)
–	Japan	68	(111)
Medal record
Asian Championship
Bronze medal – third place	2020 Kuwait

Kohei Narita (成田 幸平, Narita Kohei; born 15 June 1989) is a Japanese handball player for Wakunaga Leolic and the Japanese national team. He plays in the left back position.

He participated at the 2017 World Men's Handball Championship. His first Olympics games participation was in 2020.
