= HSG Wetzlar =

German handball club

- Full name: Handballspielgemeinschaft Wetzlar
- Founded: 1904; 122 years ago as TSV Dutenhofen
- Arena: Buderus Arena
- Capacity: 5,000
- Head coach: Frank Carstens
- League: Handball-Bundesliga
- 2025–26: 16th of 18
- Club colours
Home	Away

HSG Wetzlar is a professional handball club from Wetzlar, Germany. It competes in the top-tier Handball-Bundesliga and in the German Handball Cup. They have played in the Bundesliga since 1998 without relegation.

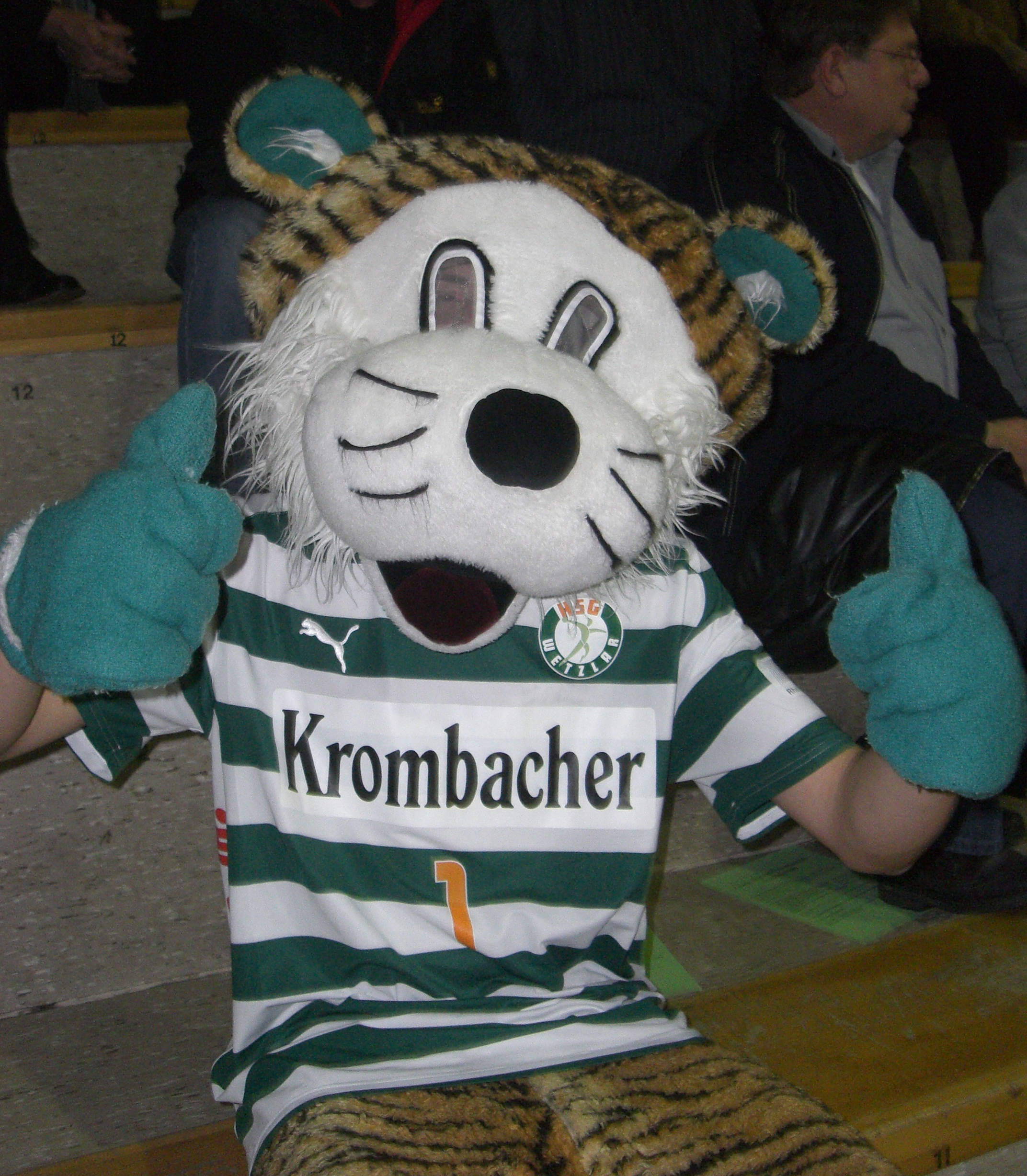
Wetzi – the official mascot of HSG Wetzlar.

== History ==
The modern club was founded in 1992 by a fusion of TSV Dutenhofen and Münchholzhausen, which were founded in 1904 and 1909 respectively. From 1992 to 1999 they were known as Handballspielgemeinschaft Dutenhofen/Münchholzhausen and from 1999 to 2004 they were known as HSG D/M Wetzlar. They have had their modern name, HSG Wetzlar, since then.

In 1997 they managed a bit of a sensation, when they reached the final of the DHB-Pokal as a second division team, which qualified them for the EHF Cup the following season. Here they once again surprised, when they reached the final.

In the 2016-17 season they reached their best league position ever - a 6th place in the Bundesliga with over 40 points. During this season Philipp Weber was the league top scorer with 224 goals in 34 games and their coach Kai Wandschneider was selected as coach of the season.

== Crest, colours, supporters ==
=== Kits ===
HOME
2011-12	2015–16	2016–17	2023–24

AWAY
2015–16	2016–17	2023–24

THIRD
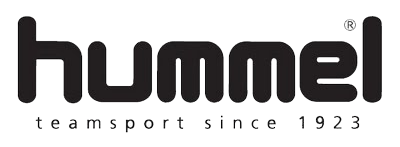
2016–17

== Accomplishments ==
- DHB-Pokal final:
  - 1997, 2001
- EHF Cup Winner's Cup final:
  - 1998

== Rivalry ==
HSG Wetzlar's arch-rival is the neighbouring club TV Hüttenberg and games between the clubs are considered as the "Mittelhessenderby".

== Team ==
=== Current squad ===
Squad for the 2024–25 season

Goalkeepers

- 1 (Germany) Marius Göbner
- 11 (Germany) Till Klimpke
- 12 (Qatar) Anadin Suljaković

Left Wingers

- 18 (Germany) Lukas Becher
- 50 (Germany) Lion Zacharias

Right Wingers

- 10 (Hungary) Zsolt Krakovszki
- 24 (Germany) Tizian Weimer
- 75 (Slovenia) Domen Novak

Line players

- 5 (Denmark) Rasmus Meyer Ejlersen
- 14 (Bosnia and Herzegovina) Vladimir Vranješ
- 27 (Belarus) Nikita Pliuto
- 33 (Germany) Georg Löwen

Left Backs

- 9 (Germany) Ole Klimpke
- 19 (Germany) Philipp Ahouansou

Central Backs

- 7 (Germany) Dominik Mappes
- 22 (Germany) Jona Schoch
- 25 (Germany) Justin Müller

Right Backs

- 17 (Germany) Noel Hoepfner
- 42 (Serbia) Nemanja Zelenović
- 77 (Montenegro) Stefan Čavor

=== Technical staff ===
- Head coach: (Germany) Frank Carstens
- Assistant coach: (North Macedonia) Filip Mirkulovski

=== Transfers ===
Transfers for the 2026–27 season

Joining

- (Norway) Petter Øverby (LP) from (Germany) THW Kiel
- (Hungary) László Bartucz (GK) from (Germany) MT Melsungen
- (Denmark) Nikolaj Læsø (LB) from (Denmark) Bjerringbro-Silkeborg Håndbold
- (Czech Republic) Tomáš Piroch (RB) from (Germany) SC DHfK Leipzig
- (Turkey) Doruk Pehlivan (LB) from (Germany) HC Elbflorenz Dresden
- (Spain) Martí Soler (LW) from (Germany) MT Melsungen
- (Germany) Paul Kompenhans (CB) from (Germany) TV Hüttenberg
- (Serbia) Miloš Kos (LB) from (Serbia) RK Partizan

Leaving

- (Sweden) Andreas Palicka (GK) to (Germany) Füchse Berlin
- (Montenegro) Stefan Čavor (RB) to (Slovenia) RD Slovan
- (Qatar) (Bosnia and Herzegovina) Anadin Suljaković (GK) to (Germany) SC DHfK Leipzig
- (Croatia) Filip Vistorop (CB) to (Greece) AEK Athens
- (Germany) Philipp Ahouansou (LB) to (Germany) TVB Stuttgart
- (Germany) Lion Zacharias (LW) to (Germany) HBW Balingen-Weilstetten
- (Germany) Justin Müller (CB) to (Switzerland) HC Kriens-Luzern
- (Germany) Julius Gümbel (LP) to (Germany) TV Hüttenberg
- (Germany) Phil Spandau (LW) to (Germany) TV Hüttenberg
- (Germany) Georg Löwen (LP) on loan at (Germany) TV Hüttenberg

=== Transfer History ===
Transfers for the 2025–26 season

Joining

- (Netherlands) Bart Ravensbergen (GK) from (Germany) Frisch Auf Göppingen
- (Croatia) Nikola Grahovac (LP) from (Hungary) ONE Veszprém
- (Croatia) Filip Vistorop (CB) from (Germany) ThSV Eisenach
- (Croatia) Josip Šimić (LP) from (Germany) 1. VfL Potsdam
- (Egypt) Ahmed Seesa (LW) from (Serbia) RK Vojvodina
- (Egypt) Karim Handawy (GK) from (Saudi Arabia) Al-Safa Club
- (Germany) David Cyrill Akakpo (RW) from (Germany) 1. VfL Potsdam
- (Germany) Niklas Theiss (RB) from (Germany) TV Hüttenberg
- (Germany) Tristan Kirschner (RW) from (Germany) TV Hüttenberg
- (Sweden) Andreas Palicka (GK) from (Norway) Kolstad Håndball

Leaving

- (Slovenia) Domen Novak (RW) to (Germany) SG Flensburg-Handewitt
- (Bosnia and Herzegovina) Vladimir Vranješ (LP) to (Hungary) Csurgói KK
- (Hungary) Zsolt Krakovszki (RW) to (Hungary) Győri ETO-UNI FKC
- (Denmark) Rasmus Meyer Ejlersen (LP) to (Denmark) Ribe-Esbjerg HH
- (Norway) Viktor Petersen Norberg (RB) to (Germany) HC Elbflorenz
- (Germany) Till Klimpke (GK) to (Denmark) HØJ Elite
- (Egypt) Karim Handawy (GK) to (Libya) Al-Ittihad SC

Transfers for the 2024–25 season

Joining

- (Germany) Marius Göbner (GK) (from own youth)
- (Germany) Lion Zacharias (LW) (from (Germany) Rhein-Neckar Löwen)
- (Germany) Philipp Ahouansou (LB) (from (Germany) Rhein-Neckar Löwen)
- (Germany) Jona Schoch (CB) (from (Germany) HBW Balingen-Weilstetten)
- (Germany) Dominik Mappes (CB) (from (Germany) VfL Gummersbach)
- (Germany) Justin Müller (CB) (from (Denmark) Nordsjælland Håndbold)
- (Germany) Noel Hoepfner (RB) (from own youth)
- (Hungary) Zsolt Krakovszki (RW) (from (Hungary) NEKA)
- (Germany) Tizian Weimer (RW) (from own youth)
- (Germany) Georg Löwen (P) (from (Germany) SC Magdeburg)

Leaving

- (Switzerland) Leonard Grazioli (GK) (to (Switzerland) Pfadi Winterthur)
- (Sweden) Emil Mellegård (LW) (to (Denmark) HØJ Elite)
- (Germany) Hendrik Wagner (LB) (to (Germany) TBV Lemgo)
- (Switzerland) Lenny Rubin (LB) (to (Germany) TVB Stuttgart)
- (Norway) Magnus Fredriksen (CB) (to (Denmark) SønderjyskE Herrehåndbold)
- (Denmark) Mathias Pedersen (CB) (to (Sweden) Amo Handboll)
- (Germany) Julian Fuchs (RW) (end of loan (Germany) MT Melsungen, joins (Germany) Bergischer HC)
- (Germany) Erik Schmidt (P) (to (Greece) AEK Athens)

=== Notable former players ===
- (Germany) Michael Allendorf
- (Germany) Markus Baur
- (Germany) Sven-Sören Christophersen
- (Germany) Lars Kaufmann
- (Germany) Jannik Kohlbacher
- (Germany) Andreas Wolff
- (Germany) Tobias Reichmann
- (Germany) Steffen Fäth
- (Croatia) Ivano Balić
- (Sweden) Ola Lindgren
- (Norway) Kent Robin Tønnesen
- (Israel) Avishay Smoler
