= 1. VfL Potsdam =

German handball club

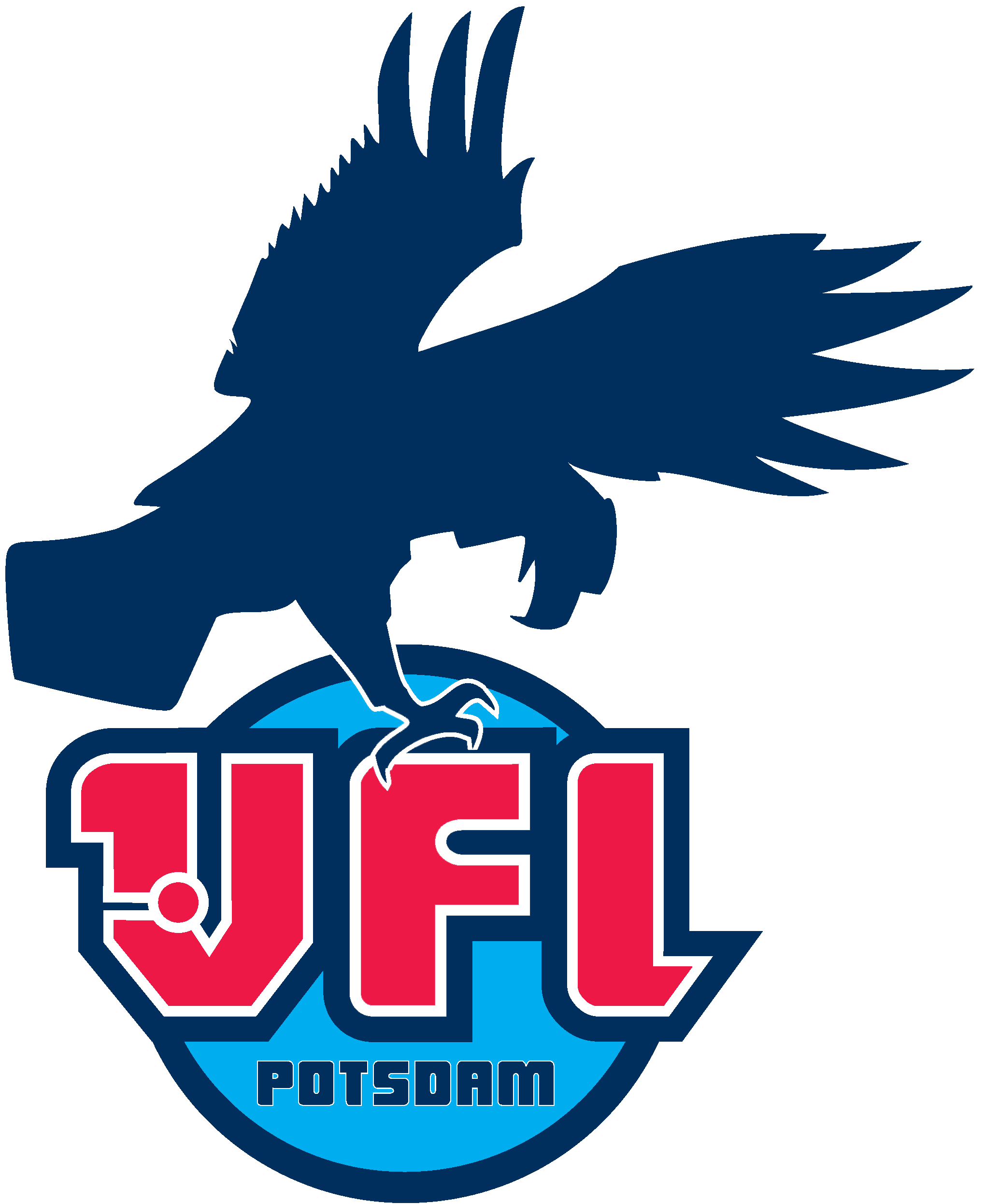
- Nickname: Die Adler (The Eagles)
- Founded: 1990; 36 years ago
- Arena: MBS Arena Potsdam
- Capacity: 2,050
- Head coach: Emir Kurtagic
- League: Handball-Bundesliga
- 2024–25: 18th of 18
- Club colours

1. VfL Potsdam is a professional handball club from Potsdam, Germany, that currently competes in the Handball-Bundesliga, the top division of German handball. During the 2023–24 season, they were promoted to the Handball-Bundesliga for the first time. They were however relegated just the season after. They have a close sporting cooperation with Füchse Berlin.

== Sports hall ==
- Name: – MBS Arena Potsdam
- City: – Potsdam
- Capacity: – 2,050

== Team ==
=== Current squad ===
Squad for the 2024–25 season

Goalkeepers

- 1 (Germany) Frederick Höler

Left wingers

- 6 (Germany) Marvin Siemer
- 27 (Germany) Nils Fuhrmann

Right wingers

- 14 (Germany) Max Günther
- (Germany) Tim Hildenbrand

Line players

- 35 (Germany) Nicholas Schley
- (Italy) Gabriele Sontacchi

Left backs

- 99 (Austria) Marko Katic

Centre Backs

- 28 (Germany) Marvin Kix

Right backs

- 7 (Austria) Nicolas Paulnsteiner
- (Austria) Markus Mahr
- (Austria) Florian Budde

=== Technical staff ===
- Head coach: (Germany) Emir Kurtagic
- Assistant coach: (Germany) Norman Flödl

=== Transfers ===
Transfers for the 2026–27 season

Joining

- (Italy) Giacomo Savini (CB) from (Italy) Cassano Magnago HC
- (Italy) Tommaso Romei (LP) from (Austria) Bregenz Handball
- (Austria) Clemens Möstl (LB) on loan from (Germany) Füchse Berlin
- (Austria) Felix Bernkop-Schnürch (LW) on loan from (Germany) Füchse Berlin

Leaving

- (Italy) Gabriele Sontacchi (LP) to (Italy) Pallamano Pressano
- (Germany) Jannek Klein (RB) to (Germany) TV Großwallstadt
- (Germany) Nils Fuhrmann (LW) to (Germany) HC Elbflorenz Dresden
- (Germany) Nicholas Schley (LP) to (Germany) TUSEM Essen
- (Germany) Dustin Kraus (LB) to (Germany) VfL Eintracht Hagen

=== Transfer History ===
Transfers for the 2025–26 season

Joining

- (Austria) Markus Mahr (CB) from (Austria) Bregenz Handball
- (Austria) Florian Budde (RB) (from (Germany) Füchse Berlin)
- (Italy) Gabriele Sontacchi (LP) from (Italy) SSV Bozen Loacker
- (Italy) Marco Mengon (CB) from (France) Sélestat Alsace Handball
- (Germany) Tim Hildenbrand (RW) from (Germany) HSG Krefeld
- (Italy) Davide Bulzamini (LB) (from (Italy) Pallamano Conversano)

Leaving

- (Austria) Elias Kofler (CB) to (Germany) HSV Hamburg
- (Sweden) Emil Hansson (LB) to (Sweden) Önnereds HK
- (Russia) Sergey Gorpishin (LP) to (Germany) TV Emsdetten
- (Slovenia) Mark Ferjan (GK) (to ?)
- (North Macedonia) Martin Tomovski (GK) to (Germany) SG BBM Bietigheim
- (Croatia) Josip Šimić (LP) to (Germany) HSG Wetzlar
- (Germany) David Cyrill Akakpo (RW) to (Germany) HSG Wetzlar
- (Germany) Maxim Orlov (CB) to (Germany) TSV Hannover-Burgdorf
- (Germany) Olé Schramm (LB) to (Germany) VfL Lübeck-Schwartau
- (Germany) Jannek Klein (RB) (end of loan to (Germany) Füchse Berlin)
