= 2024–25 Handball-Bundesliga =

Handball-Bundesliga
- Season: 2024–25
- Dates: 5 September 2024 – 8 June 2025
- Champions: Füchse Berlin
- Relegated: SG BBM Bietigheim; 1. VfL Potsdam
- Champions League: Füchse Berlin; SC Magdeburg
- EHF European League: MT Melsungen; THW Kiel; SG Flensburg-Handewitt
- Matches: 306
- Goals: 18,015 (58.87 per match)
- Best player: Mathias Gidsel
- Top goalscorer: Marko Grgić (232 goals)

The 2024–25 Handball-Bundesliga was the 60th season of the Handball-Bundesliga, Germany's premier handball league and the 47th season consisting of only one league. It ran from 5 September 2024 to 8 June 2025. The naming rights moved from Liqui Moly to Daikin.

Füchse Berlin won their first championship ever.

== Teams ==
Locations of the 2024–25 Handball-Bundesliga teams

=== Team changes ===
Promoted from 2023–24 2. Handball-Bundesliga	Relegated from 2023–24 Handball-Bundesliga
1. VfL Potsdam; SG BBM Bietigheim	Bergischer HC; HBW Balingen-Weilstetten

=== Stadiums ===
Team	Location	Arena	Capacity
Füchse Berlin	Berlin	Max-Schmeling-Halle	9,000
SG BBM Bietigheim	Bietigheim-Bissingen	EgeTrans Arena	4,583
ThSV Eisenach	Eisenach	Werner-Aßmann-Halle	3,100
HC Erlangen	Nuremberg	Arena Nürnberger Versicherung	8,308
SG Flensburg-Handewitt	Flensburg	Flens-Arena	6,300
Frisch Auf Göppingen	Göppingen	EWS Arena	5,600
VfL Gummersbach	Gummersbach	Schwalbe-Arena	4,132
HSV Hamburg	Hamburg	Alsterdorfer Sporthalle	7,000
TSV Hannover-Burgdorf	Hanover	ZAG-Arena; Swiss Life Hall	9,850; 4,460
THW Kiel	Kiel	Wunderino Arena	10,285
SC DHfK Leipzig	Leipzig	Quarterback Immobilien Arena	6,327
TBV Lemgo	Lemgo	Phoenix-Contact-Arena	4,520
SC Magdeburg	Magdeburg	GETEC Arena	6,600
MT Melsungen	Kassel	Rothenbach-Halle	4,500
1. VfL Potsdam	Potsdam	MBS Arena Potsdam	2,050
Rhein-Neckar Löwen	Mannheim	SAP Arena	13,200
TVB Stuttgart	Stuttgart	Porsche-Arena	6,211
HSG Wetzlar	Wetzlar	Buderus Arena Wetzlar	4,421

== Standings ==
Pos	Team	Pld	W	D	L	GF	GA	GD	Pts	Qualification or relegation
1	Füchse Berlin (C)	34	27	4	3	1197	984	+213	58	Champions League
2	SC Magdeburg	34	28	1	5	1076	913	+163	57	Champions League
3	MT Melsungen	34	27	1	6	1020	906	+114	55	EHF European League
4	THW Kiel	34	25	1	8	1061	946	+115	51	EHF European League
5	SG Flensburg-Handewitt	34	21	5	8	1134	1028	+106	47	EHF European League
6	TSV Hannover-Burgdorf	34	20	4	10	1036	994	+42	44	EHF European League qualifying round
7	VfL Gummersbach	34	19	2	13	1051	1007	+44	40	
8	TBV Lemgo	34	18	3	13	964	930	+34	39	
9	Rhein-Neckar Löwen	34	17	2	15	1027	1027	0	36	
10	HSV Hamburg (Note: On 3 May 2024, it was announced that HSV Hamburg did not get the license for this season. This was appealed by Hamburg. Hamburg was given the licence on 31 May with a specific condition.)	34	15	5	14	1060	1070	−10	35	
11	ThSV Eisenach	34	12	3	19	1047	1050	−3	27	
12	Frisch Auf Göppingen	34	10	4	20	928	1010	−82	24	
13	SC DHfK Leipzig	34	10	1	23	994	1027	−33	21	
14	HSG Wetzlar	34	9	1	24	897	1013	−116	19	
15	HC Erlangen	34	7	4	23	885	983	−98	18	
16	TVB Stuttgart	34	9	0	25	906	1045	−139	18	
17	SG BBM Bietigheim (R)	34	7	3	24	930	1077	−147	17	Relegated to 2. Handball-Bundesliga
18	1. VfL Potsdam (R)	34	3	0	31	802	1005	−203	6	Relegated to 2. Handball-Bundesliga

Source: HBL
Rules for classification: 1) points; 2) head-to-head points; 3) head-to-head goal difference; 4) head-to-head number of goals scored; 5) goal difference; 6) goals scored.
(C) Champions; (R) Relegated

== Results ==
Home \ Away	BER	BIE	EIS	ERL	FLE	GÖP	GUM	HAM	HAN	KIE	LEI	LEM	MAG	MEL	POT	RNL	STU	WET
Füchse Berlin	—	42–30	34–26	30–27	36–31	35–23	45–35	40–35	37–33	35–26	37–32	33–21	31–31	37–29	36–19	34–27	33–29	38–29
SG BBM Bietigheim	24–38	—	26–34	23–29	29–29	31–30	30–32	29–35	28–28	24–39	28–29	23–28	25–35	28–32	30–28	25–33	29–30	27–28
ThSV Eisenach	35–41	32–35	—	26–26	25–30	35–25	30–34	32–31	26–31	33–37	34–34	34–31	26–36	32–31	37–19	30–35	25–29	30–22
HC Erlangen	31–31	25–25	24–28	—	26–32	28–24	24–31	29–35	33–33	28–37	23–25	19–28	23–34	25–31	23–19	34–25	25–26	22–25
SG Flensburg-Handewitt	38–37	39–27	39–39	42–28	—	37–32	35–30	40–37	34–32	36–33	35–29	36–27	27–29	35–33	39–22	28–33	32–27	36–22
Frisch Auf Göppingen	28–43	30–25	31–27	25–24	27–27	—	24–24	25–25	31–33	29–36	29–27	29–22	25–28	25–29	30–25	30–36	28–27	27–24
VfL Gummersbach	22–29	37–27	34–32	28–24	29–29	41–25	—	33–29	39–29	24–30	32–31	27–29	31–32	24–29	31–27	36–25	36–29	33–24
HSV Hamburg	29–29	37–36	31–29	28–27	32–32	31–30	30–37	—	32–32	25–31	33–32	30–26	26–32	42–32	28–23	30–30	41–28	33–29
TSV Hannover-Burgdorf	38–35	32–18	28–26	31–25	31–30	30–36	28–32	33–32	—	29–29	24–23	30–29	28–27	23–29	26–27	35–30	33–20	33–32
THW Kiel	34–36	38–29	36–35	28–24	33–37	33–24	31–25	38–37	28–24	—	39–24	35–29	31–25	21–25	27–23	29–24	29–24	35–24
SC DHfK Leipzig	30–33	25–34	31–36	32–25	31–33	27–25	34–29	25–29	30–32	28–32	—	26–35	30–31	27–28	32–19	28–27	33–24	30–18
TBV Lemgo	25–25	33–21	31–28	30–24	34–29	29–29	35–26	41–29	22–31	22–23	33–28	—	29–31	20–28	32–23	34–31	28–24	28–25
SC Magdeburg	30–33	35–26	33–32	30–19	35–27	31–24	37–28	37–28	34–28	24–29	35–29	30–27	—	29–28	25–15	30–27	31–20	35–28
MT Melsungen	33–31	26–24	26–25	32–27	33–24	30–23	26–25	35–28	31–23	27–22	34–25	26–26	31–23	—	31–23	25–22	35–29	33–27
1. VfL Potsdam	26–36	26–28	26–31	23–26	26–34	21–25	26–28	30–31	22–27	22–25	26–35	21–22	23–37	26–31	—	18–25	28–25	32–28
Rhein-Neckar Löwen	33–38	36–30	32–36	38–33	31–29	29–28	32–34	30–27	35–36	32–27	35–34	33–26	25–36	31–26	29–26	—	26–33	32–27
TVB Stuttgart	20–35	26–30	31–30	27–30	25–39	30–26	28–35	27–28	27–35	32–35	29–28	23–26	25–36	27–36	29–24	25–28	—	23–26
HSG Wetzlar	25–34	21–26	30–31	21–25	28–34	30–26	32–29	31–26	25–36	27–25	31–30	20–26	29–32	27–29	26–18	30–30	26–28	—

Source: DKB
Legend: Blue = home team win; Yellow = draw; Red = away team win.

== Top goalscorers ==
Rank	Player	Club	Goals	Shots	%
1	(Germany) Marko Grgić	ThSV Eisenach	301	445	68
2	(Denmark) Mathias Gidsel	Füchse Berlin	275	357	77
3	(Denmark) Emil Jakobsen	SG Flensburg-Handewitt	244	329	74
4	(Denmark) Emil Wernsdorf Madsen	THW Kiel	217	349	62
5	(Germany) Renars Uscins	TSV Hannover-Burgdorf	213	365	58
6	(Germany) Tim Freihöfer	Füchse Berlin	211	273	77
7	(Germany) Marius Steinhauser	TSV Hannover-Burgdorf	196	268	73
8	(Denmark) Frederik Bo Andersen	HSV Hamburg	186	247	75
9	(Germany) Miro Schluroff	VfL Gummersbach	178	284	63
10	(Germany) Luca Witzke	SC DHfK Leipzig	169	262	65
