= Frisch Auf Göppingen =

German sports club

TPSG Frisch Auf Göppingen
- Full name: Turn- und Polizeisportgemeinschaft Frisch Auf Göppingen e.V.
- Short name: FAG
- Founded: 1920; 106 years ago
- Arena: EWS Arena
- Capacity: 5,600
- Head coach: Ben Matschke
- League: Handball-Bundesliga
- 2025–26: 9th of 18
- Club colours
Home	Away

Turn- und Polizeisportgemeinschaft Frisch Auf Göppingen e.V. is a sports club from Germany, located in Göppingen, Baden-Württemberg. The club's men's handball team plays under the name FRISCH AUF! Göppingen in Handball-Bundesliga. Nine-time champions of Germany, Göppingen were at their most successful during the early 1960s. The club's women's handball team Frisch Auf Frauen also plays in Handball-Bundesliga.

Location of Frisch Auf Göppingen

== Men's handball team ==
=== History ===
TPSG Frisch Auf Göppingen was founded in 1896 as the Göppingen Gymnastics Club (Turnclub Göppingen). In October 1920, the club established its own handball division. In 1971, the Frisch Auf Göppingen Gymnastics Club merged with the Göppingen Police Sports Association to form the Turn- und Polizeisportgemeinschaft Frisch Auf Göppingen. The club won nine championships between 1954 and 1972. He spent the 1990s in the 2. Handball-Bundesliga. In 2001, however, they were promoted to the Handball-Bundesliga again. In the 2010s, the club won four EHF Cups (2011, 2012, 2016 and 2017). The "Frisch Auf" part of the club's name is an old German salutation amongst gymnasts.

=== Crest, colours, supporters ===
==== Kit manufacturers ====
Period	Kit manufacturer
–2018	(Switzerland) Pro Touch
2018–present	(Denmark) Hummel

==== Kits ====
HOME
Pro Touch; 2011–12	Pro Touch; 2012–14	Pro Touch; 2014–15	Pro Touch; 2016–17	Pro Touch; 2017–18	2018–19	2020–

AWAY
Pro Touch; 2011–12	Pro Touch; 2012–14	Pro Touch; 2014–15	Pro Touch; 2016–17	Pro Touch; 2017–18	2018–19	2021–

=== Accomplishments ===
- Handball-Bundesliga:
  - Gold: 1954, 1955, 1958, 1959, 1960, 1961, 1965, 1970, 1972
- 2. Handball-Bundesliga:
  - Gold: 2001
- EHF Champions League:
  - Gold: 1960, 1962
  - Silver: 1959
- EHF European League:
  - Gold: 2011, 2012, 2016, 2017
  - Silver: 2006
  - Bronze: 2023

=== Sports Hall information ===
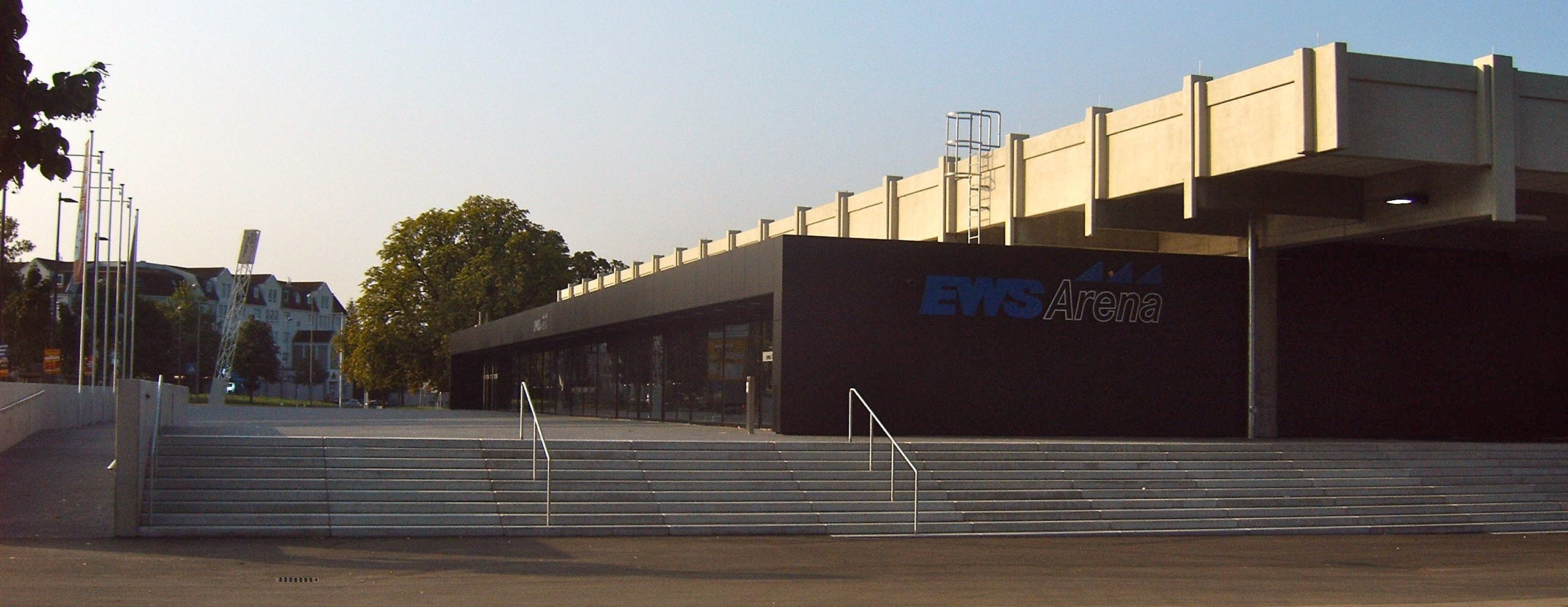
Home hall: EWS Arena

- Name: – EWS Arena
- City: – Göppingen
- Capacity: – 5600
- Address: – Nördliche Ringstraße 87, 73033 Göppingen, Germany

=== Team ===
==== Current squad ====
Squad for the 2025–26 season

Frisch Auf Göppingen

Goalkeepers

- 1 (Germany) Julian Buchele
- 12 (Norway) Kristian Sæverås
- 79 (Germany) Titus Lewe

Left wingers

- 5 (Netherlands) Rutger ten Velde
- 24 (Germany) Marcel Schiller

Right wingers

- 17 (Germany) Tim Goßner
- 18 (Germany) Fynn Hofele (Note: Also plays as right back.)
- 28 (Austria) Franko Lastro

Line players

- 25 (Sweden) Ludvig Jurmala Åström
- 33 (Iceland) Ýmir Örn Gíslason

Left backs

- 2 (Germany) Oskar Neudeck
- 7 (Denmark) Victor Kløve
- 27 (Sweden) Oskar Sunnefeldt (Note: Also plays as centre back.)
- 42 (Germany) Martin Hanne

Centre backs

- 20 (Sweden) Ludvig Hallbäck
- 40 (Germany) Elias Newel

Right backs

- 22 (Sweden) Erik Persson
- 77 (Germany) David Schmidt

==== Technical staff ====
- Head coach: (Germany) Ben Matschke
- Goalkeeping coach: (Germany) Alexander Vorontsov
- Physiotherapist: (Germany) Thomas Hummel
- Physiotherapist: (Germany) Sebastian Daebel
- Club doctor: (Germany) Dr. Christian Grill

=== Transfers ===
Transfers for the 2026–27 season

Joining

- (Germany) Max Beneke (RB) from (Germany) Füchse Berlin

Leaving

Transfers for the 2027–28 season

Joining

- (Norway) David Walstad Haugstvedt (RB) from Drammen HK

Leaving

- (Denmark) Victor Kløve (LB) to (Germany) SG Flensburg-Handewitt
- (Sweden) Erik Persson (RB) to (Germany) MT Melsungen

=== Transfer History ===
Transfers for the 2025–26 season

Joining

- (Norway) Kristian Sæverås (GK) from (Germany) SC DHfK Leipzig
- (Germany) Martin Hanne (LB) from (Germany) TSV Hannover-Burgdorf

Leaving

- (Croatia) Josip Šarac (LB) to (Hungary) MOL Tatabánya KC
- (Serbia) Tibor Ivanišević (GK) to (Germany) GWD Minden
- (Netherlands) Bart Ravensbergen (GK) to (Germany) HSG Wetzlar
- (Sweden) Andreas Flodman (RW) to (Sweden) Eskilstuna Guif

=== Previous squads ===
2016–2017 Team
Shirt No	Nationality	Player	Birth Date	Position
3	Germany	Tobias Gehrke	5 January 1996 (age 30)	Central Back
4	Germany	Tim Kneule	18 August 1986 (age 40)	Central Back
5	Germany	Joschua Braun	11 July 1998 (age 28)	Right Winger
6	Germany	Jona Schoch	2 August 1994 (age 32)	Central Back
7	Germany	Christian Schöne	23 February 1981 (age 45)	Right Winger
9	Germany	Manuel Späth	16 October 1985 (age 41)	Line Player
10	Germany	Sebastian Heymann	1 March 1998 (age 28)	Left Back
12	Germany	Daniel Rebmann	16 January 1994 (age 32)	Goalkeeper
13	Sweden	Niclas Barud	22 March 1988 (age 38)	Line Player
15	Serbia	Žarko Šešum	16 June 1986 (age 40)	Left Back
16	Slovenia	Primož Prošt	4 July 1983 (age 43)	Goalkeeper
17	Germany	Daniel Fontaine	2 July 1989 (age 37)	Left Back
18	Germany	Lars Kaufmann	25 February 1982 (age 44)	Left Back
21	Sweden	Andreas Berg	9 May 1992 (age 34)	Left Winger
23	Germany	Bastian Rutschmann	30 December 1982 (age 43)	Goalkeeper
24	Germany	Marcel Schiller	15 August 1991 (age 35)	Left Winger
26	Germany	Adrian Pfahl	30 July 1982 (age 44)	Right Back
27	Germany	Marco Rentschler	28 December 1994 (age 31)	Right Winger
30	Sweden	Anton Halén	28 November 1990 (age 35)	Right Winger
33	Germany	Jens Schöngarth	7 December 1988 (age 37)	Right Back

2015–2016 Team
Shirt No	Nationality	Player	Birth Date	Position
1	Hungary	Péter Tatai	23 June 1983 (age 43)	Goalkeeper
2	Germany	Michael Kraus	28 September 1983 (age 43)	Central Back
3	Germany	Tobias Gehrke	5 January 1996 (age 30)	Central Back
4	Germany	Tim Kneule	18 August 1986 (age 40)	Central Back
6	Germany	Jona Schoch	2 August 1994 (age 32)	Central Back
7	Germany	Christian Schöne	23 February 1981 (age 45)	Right Winger
9	Germany	Manuel Späth	16 October 1985 (age 41)	Line Player
10	France	Alix Nyokas	28 June 1986 (age 40)	Right Back
12	Germany	Felix Lobedank	12 August 1984 (age 42)	Right Back
13	Sweden	Niclas Barud	22 March 1988 (age 38)	Line Player
15	Serbia	Žarko Šešum	16 June 1986 (age 40)	Left Back
16	Slovenia	Primož Prošt	4 July 1983 (age 43)	Goalkeeper
17	Germany	Daniel Fontaine	2 July 1989 (age 37)	Left Back
18	Germany	Lars Kaufmann	25 February 1982 (age 44)	Left Back
20	Norway	Thomas Kristensen	2 May 1990 (age 36)	Right Winger
21	Sweden	Andreas Berg	9 May 1992 (age 34)	Left Winger
22	Germany	Marvin Fuß	31 March 1996 (age 30)	Left Back
23	Germany	Bastian Rutschmann	30 December 1982 (age 43)	Goalkeeper
24	Germany	Marcel Schiller	15 August 1991 (age 35)	Left Winger
26	Germany	Daniel Rebmann	16 January 1994 (age 32)	Goalkeeper
27	Germany	Marco Rentschler	28 December 1994 (age 31)	Right Winger
28	Germany	Adrian Pfahl	30 July 1982 (age 44)	Right Back
29	Germany	Nicolas Gross	10 April 1997 (age 29)	Goalkeeper
30	Sweden	Anton Halén	28 November 1990 (age 35)	Right Winger

2011–2012 Team
Shirt No	Nationality	Player	Birth Date	Position
1	Bosnia and Herzegovina	Enid Tahirović	22 July 1972 (age 54)	Goalkeeper
4	Germany	Tim Kneule	18 August 1986 (age 40)	Central Back
5	RomaniaGermany	Dragoș Oprea	4 April 1982 (age 44)	Left Winger
6	Germany	Michael Thiede	22 September 1981 (age 45)	Right Back
7	Germany	Christian Schöne	23 February 1981 (age 45)	Right Winger
9	Germany	Manuel Späth	16 October 1985 (age 41)	Line Player
11	MontenegroSerbia	Draško Mrvaljević	17 November 1979 (age 46)	Central Back
12	Germany	Felix Lobedank	12 August 1984 (age 42)	Right Back
13	Serbia	Mitar Markez	25 October 1990 (age 35)	Right Back
14	Bosnia and HerzegovinaCroatia	Dalibor Anušić	7 April 1976 (age 50)	Line Player
15	Germany	Michael Haaß	12 December 1983 (age 42)	Central Back
22	Serbia	Momir Rnić	1 November 1987 (age 38)	Left Back
23	Germany	Bastian Rutschmann	30 December 1982 (age 43)	Goalkeeper
24	Germany	Maximilian Schubert	7 September 1990 (age 36)	Left Winger
27	Serbia	Božidar Markićević	2 October 1983 (age 43)	Central Back
28	Czech Republic	Pavel Horák	28 November 1982 (age 43)	Left Back

2010–2011 Team
Shirt No	Nationality	Player	Birth Date	Position
1	Bosnia and Herzegovina	Enid Tahirović	22 July 1972 (age 54)	Goalkeeper
4	Germany	Tim Kneule	18 August 1986 (age 40)	Central Back
5	RomaniaGermany	Dragoș Oprea	4 April 1982 (age 44)	Left Winger
6	Germany	Michael Thiede	22 September 1981 (age 45)	Right Back
7	Germany	Christian Schöne	23 February 1981 (age 45)	Right Winger
9	Germany	Manuel Späth	16 October 1985 (age 41)	Line Player
10	Germany	Lars Kaufmann	25 February 1982 (age 44)	Left Back
11	MontenegroSerbia	Draško Mrvaljević	17 November 1979 (age 46)	Central Back
12	Slovenia	Jure Vran	23 July 1984 (age 42)	Goalkeeper
14	Bosnia and HerzegovinaCroatia	Dalibor Anušić	7 April 1976 (age 50)	Line Player
15	Germany	Michael Haaß	12 December 1983 (age 42)	Central Back
16	Poland	Adam Weiner	28 March 1975 (age 51)	Goalkeeper
18	Germany	Kai Häfner	10 July 1989 (age 37)	Right Back
22	Germany	Fabian Gutbrod	1 July 1988 (age 38)	Left Back
24	Germany	Maximilian Schubert	7 September 1990 (age 36)	Left Winger
28	Czech Republic	Pavel Horák	28 November 1982 (age 43)	Left Back

=== European competition ===
EHF Cup Winners' Cup: from the 2012–13 season, the men's competition was merged with the EHF Cup.
EHF Cup: It was formerly known as the IHF Cup until 1993. Also, starting from the 2012–13 season the competition has been merged with the EHF Cup Winners' Cup. The competition will be known as the EHF European League from the 2020–21 season.

Season	Competition	Round	Club	Home	Away	Aggregate
2016–17	EHF Cup	R3	(Switzerland) Pfadi Winterthur	33–30	37–32	70–62
2016–17	EHF Cup	Group stage	(Spain) Fraikin Granollers	29–28	35–27	1st place
2016–17	EHF Cup	Group stage	(Portugal) FC Porto	30–28	31–27	1st place
2016–17	EHF Cup	Group stage	(Denmark) HC Midtjylland	31–23	25–22	1st place
2016–17	EHF Cup	Quarterfinal	Bye (Final Four Host)			
2016–17	EHF Cup	Final Four	(Germany) SC Magdeburg	33–29		Cup Champions
2016–17	EHF Cup	Final Four	(Germany) Füchse Berlin	30–22		Cup Champions
2022–23	EHF European League	Q2	(Germany) TBV Lemgo Lippe	28–24	31–33	59–57
2022–23	EHF European League	Group stage	(Hungary) Fejér Veszprém	46–30	40–23	2nd place
2022–23	EHF European League	Group stage	(Portugal) SL Benfica	31–29	31–27	2nd place
2022–23	EHF European League	Group stage	(France) Montpellier HB	27–25	27–35	2nd place
2022–23	EHF European League	Group stage	(Slovakia) Tatran Prešov	34–24	28–26	2nd place
2022–23	EHF European League	Group stage	(Switzerland) Kadetten Schaffhausen	24–25	35–30	2nd place
2022–23	EHF European League	Round of 16	(Iceland) Valur	33–31	36–29	69–60
2022–23	EHF European League	Quarterfinal	(Croatia) RK Nexe	32–23	31–27	63–50
2022–23	EHF European League	Semifinal	(Spain) Fraikin Granollers	29–31		Third place
2022–23	EHF European League	Third place game	(France) Montpellier HB	33–29		Third place

=== EHF ranking ===
As of 20 September 2025

Rank	Team	Points
71	(Austria) UHK Krems	68
72	(Romania) AHC Potaissa Turda	67
73	(Portugal) ABC Braga	66
74	(Germany) Frisch Auf Göppingen	65
75	(Iceland) FH Hafnarfjarðar	63
76	(Denmark) Skanderborg Aarhus Håndbold	61
77	(Bosnia and Herzegovina) RK Leotar	60

=== Former club members ===
==== Notable former players ====
- (Germany) Udo Böbel (1976–1978)
- (Germany) Peter Bucher (1961–1976, 1984–1985)
- (Germany) Ulrich Derad (1986–1989)
- (Germany) Axel Geerken (2008)
- (Germany) Fabian Gutbrod (2007–2011)
- (Germany) Michael Haaß (2009–2013)
- (Germany) Kai Häfner (2007–2011)
- (Germany) Sebastian Heymann (2016–)
- (Germany) Markus Hochhaus (1996–1998)
- (Germany) Peter Jaschke (1976–1980)
- (Germany) Lars Kaufmann (2009–2011, 2015–2017)
- (Germany) Tim Kneule (2006–)
- (Germany) Michael Kraus (2002–2007, 2013–2016)
- (Germany) Volker Michel (2004–2007)
- (Germany) Marc Nagel (1999–2004)
- (Germany) Evgeni Pevnov (2013–2015)
- (Germany) Adrian Pfahl (2015–2018)
- (Germany) Uwe Rathjen (1968–1973)
- (Germany) Daniel Rebmann (2017–)
- (Germany) Oliver Roggisch (2000–2002)
- (Germany) Marcel Schiller (2013–)
- (Germany) Jörn Schläger (2001–2003)
- (Germany) David Schmidt (2022–)
- (Germany) Christian Schöne (2005–2015)
- (Germany) Jens Schöngarth (2016–2019)
- (Germany) Martin Schwalb (1982–1984)
- (Germany) Manuel Späth (2006–2017)
- (Germany) Nicolai Theilinger (2019–2021)
- (Germany) Willi Weiss (1976–1987)
- (Germany) Hajo Wulff (2000–2003)
- (Austria) (Serbia) Nikola Marinovic (2013–2015)
- (Austria) David Szlezak (2001–2004)
- (Bosnia and Herzegovina) (Croatia) Dalibor Anušić (2007–2009, 2010–2012)
- (Bosnia and Herzegovina) Josip Perić (2018–2020)
- (Bosnia and Herzegovina) Srđan Predragović (2018-2019)
- (Bosnia and Herzegovina) Enid Tahirović (2008–2013)
- (Brazil) Bruno Souza (1999–2006)
- (Croatia) Krešimir Kozina (2017–)
- (Croatia) Kristijan Ljubanović (2009)
- (Croatia) Josip Šarac (2021–)
- (Croatia) Marin Šego (2022–)
- (Croatia) Ivan Slišković (2018–2020)
- (Cuba) (Iceland) Jalesky Garcia Padron (2003–2009)
- (Czech Republic) Luděk Drobek (2007)
- (Czech Republic) Martin Galia (2004–2008)
- (Czech Republic) Pavel Horák (2007–2013)
- (Czech Republic) Tomáš Mrkva (2012–2013)
- (Denmark) Jacob Bagersted (2017–2022)
- (Denmark) Allan Damgaard (2017–2019)
- (France) Alix Nyokas (2014–2016)
- (Hungary) Gergely Harsányi (2007–2008)
- (Hungary) Péter Tatai (2016)
- (Iran) Pouya Norouzi Nezhad (2020)
- (Iceland) Gunnar Steinn Jónsson (2021)
- (Iceland) Janus Daði Smárason (2020–2022)
- (Israel) Idan Maimon (2000–2001)
- (Lithuania) Andrius Stelmokas (2004–2006)
- (Montenegro) (Qatar) Žarko Marković (2012–2013)
- (Montenegro) (Serbia) Draško Mrvaljević (2009–2012)
- (Netherlands) Patrick Kersten (2001–2002)
- (Norway) Kevin Gulliksen (2021–2023)
- (Norway) Thomas Kristensen (2015–2016)
- (Poland) Maciej Dmytruszyński (2006–2007)
- (Poland) Jerzy Klempel (1982–1991)
- (Poland) Adam Weiner (2008–2011)
- (Romania) Silviu Băiceanu (2006–2008)
- (Romania) Rareș Jurcă (2008–2010)
- (Romania) (Germany) Dragoș Oprea (2002–2015)
- (Slovenia) Urh Kastelic (2019–2022)
- (Slovenia) Miladin Kozlina (2011)
- (Slovenia) Jaka Malus (2022–)
- (Slovenia) Vid Poteko (2022–)
- (Slovenia) Primož Prošt (2013–2019)
- (Slovenia) Jure Vran (2010–2011)
- (Spain) Marc Amargant (2003-2005)
- (Spain) Jaume Fort (2001–2004)
- (Serbia) Bojan Beljanski (2012–2015)
- (Serbia) Aleksandar Knežević (1999–2007)
- (Serbia) Nikola Manojlović (2005–2009)
- (Serbia) Mitar Markez (2011–2014)
- (Serbia) Božidar Markićević (2012)
- (Serbia) Vukašin Rajković (2005–2008)
- (Serbia) Momir Rnić (2011–2014)
- (Serbia) Žarko Šešum (2014–2018)
- (Serbia) Nemanja Zelenović (2018–2022)
- (Slovakia) Michal Shejbal (2004–2008)
- (Slovakia) Tomáš Urban (2017–2018)
- (Sweden) Niclas Barud (2015–2017)
- (Sweden) Andreas Berg (2015–2017)
- (Sweden) Anton Halén (2014–2018)

==== Former coaches ====
Seasons	Coach	Country
2004–2013	Velimir Petković	(Bosnia and Herzegovina)
2013–2014	Aleksandar Knežević	(Serbia)
2014–2017	Magnus Andersson	(Sweden)
2017–2018	Rolf Brack	(Germany)
2018–2022	Hartmut Mayerhoffer	(Germany)
2022–2024	Markus Baur	(Germany)

== Women's handball team ==
Frisch Auf Frauen
- Full name: Thop.iwent-Frisch Auf Göppingen-Sport-Dienstleistungs GmbH
- Short name: FAG, FA Frauen
- Founded: 1923; 103 years ago
- Arena: EWS Arena
- Capacity: 5,600
- Head coach: Nico Kiener
- League: Bundesliga
- 2025–26: 8th
- Club colours
Home	Away

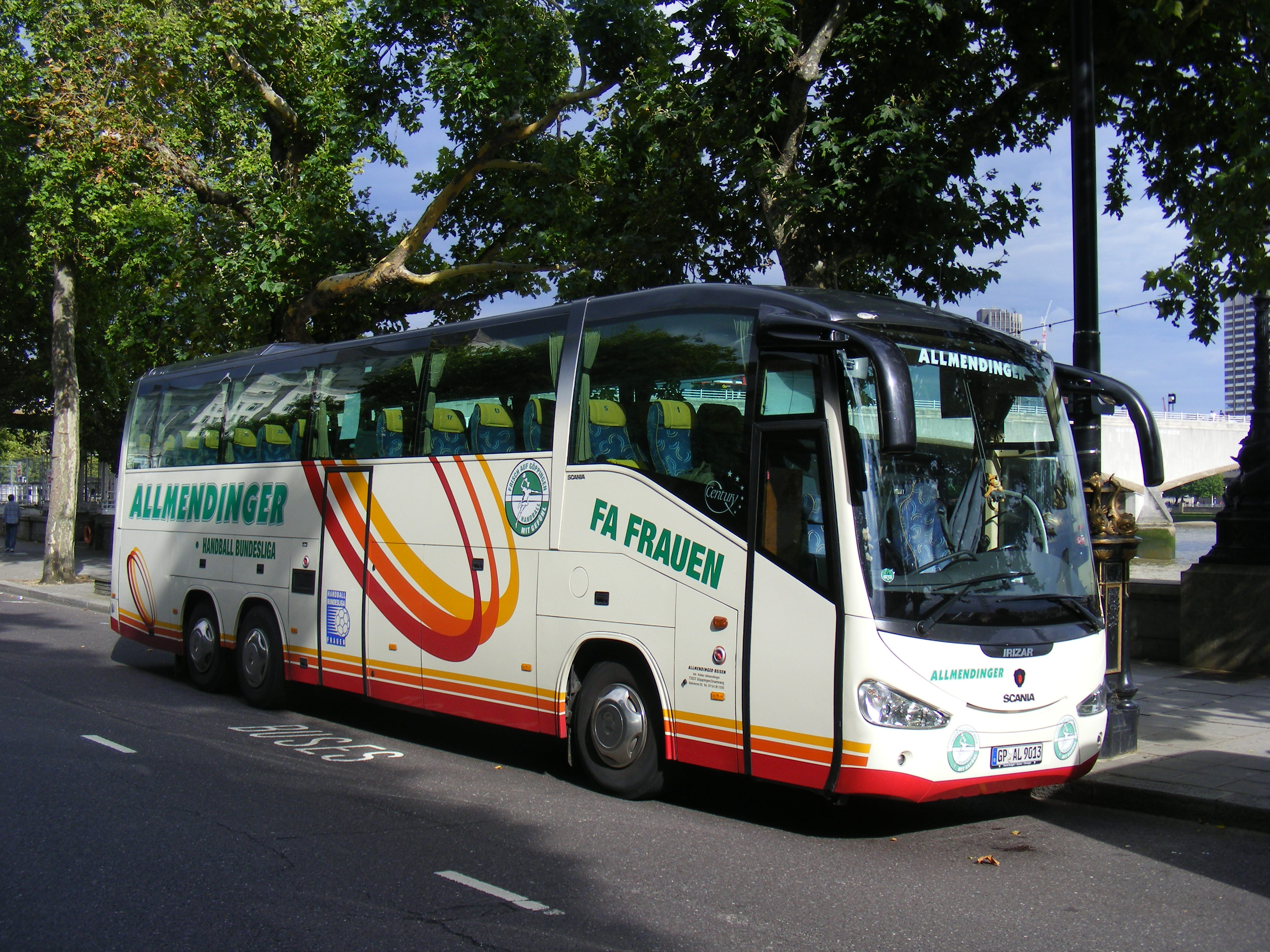
Frisch Auf Frauen teambus 2011

=== History ===
TPSG Frisch Auf Göppingen was founded in 1896 as the Göppingen Gymnastics Club. In October 1920, the club established its own handball division. The women's section was established in 1923. The team played for the first time in 2006 in the Handball-Bundesliga. The club made it to the finals of the Challenge Cup in 2010.

=== Crest, colours, supporters ===
==== Kit manufacturers ====
Period	Kit manufacturer
–2017	(Germany) Kempa
2017–2020	(Japan) Mizuno
2020–present	(Spain) Joma

==== Kits ====
HOME
2012–14	2015–17	2020–21	2021–

AWAY
2012–14	2014–15	2015–17	2020–21	2021–

THIRD
2012–14	2020–21

=== Team ===
==== Current squad ====
Squad for the 2024–25 season

Frisch Auf Göppingen

Goalkeepers

- 61 (Germany) Celina Meißner
- 72 (Hungary) Petra Hlogyik

Left wingers

- 7 (Germany) Lea Watzl
- 18 (Germany) Sarah Irmler

Right wingers

- 9 (Germany) Gianina Bianco
- 6 (Netherlands) Britt van den Baan

Line players

- 33 (Germany) Luisa Schulze
- 20 (Germany) Louisa de Bellis

Left backs

- 77 (Germany) Carmen Moser
- 22 (Germany) Sina Ehmann

Centre backs

- 16 (Netherlands) Mariel Stefanie Beugels
- 26 (Germany) Leonie Patorra
- 81 (Germany) Lea Neubrander

Right backs

- 95 (Germany) Lara Däuble
- 5 (Germany) Ann Kynast

==== Technical staff ====
- Head coach: (Germany) Nico Kiener

==== Transfers ====
Transfers for the 2026–27 season

Joining

- (Germany) Matilda Ehlert (LB) (from (Germany) HSG Bensheim/Auerbach)
- (Germany) Sophia Mohr (RW) (from own rows)

Leaving

- (Germany) Sina Ehmann (LB) (to (Germany) Neckarsulmer SU)
- (Germany) Gianina Bianco (RW) (Handball break)
- (Germany) Louisa de Bellis (LP) (retired)
- (Germany) Anna Ehmann (LW) (to (Germany) ESV 1927 Regensburg)
- (Hungary) Petra Hlogyik (GK) (Target unknown)
- (Germany) Leonie Patorra (CB) (retired)

=== EHF ranking ===
As of 24 February 2022

Rank	Team	Points
232	(Greece) Anagennisi Artas	5
233	(Azerbaijan) HC Azersu	5
234	(Germany) Frisch Auf Göppingen	5
235	(Romania) Dacia Mioveni	5
236	(Turkey) Cankaya BLD Anka SK	5
237	(Turkey) Polatli Belediyespor	4
238	(Slovenia) ŽRK Celje	4

=== Former club members ===
==== Notable former players ====
- (Germany) (Austria) Melanie Herrmann (2014–2015)
- (Germany) Selina Kalmbach (2022–)
- (Germany) Jenny Karolius (2011–2014)
- (Germany) Maria Kiedrowski (2011–2014)
- (Germany) Alexandra Meisl (2007–2010)
- (Germany) Ania Rösler (2014–2015)
- (Germany) Maike Weiss (2000–2005)
- (Austria) Beate Scheffknecht (2011–2015)
- (Austria) Johanna Schindler (2016–2020)
- (Austria) Klara Schlegel (2021–)
- (Czech Republic) Petra Adámková (2016–2020)
- (Czech Republic) Šárka Frančíková (2020–)
- (Czech Republic) Michaela Hrbková (2016–2021)
- (Czech Republic) Alena Unger (2006–2014)
- (Hungary) Edit Lengyel (2015–2022)
- (Lithuania) Birutė Stellbrink (2009–2014)
- (Luxembourg) Tina Welter (2019–2021)
- (Netherlands) Jasmina Janković (2011–2014, 2019–2021)
- (Netherlands) Wendy Smits (2008–2009)
- (Netherlands) Maxime Struijs (2015–2018)
- (Netherlands) Anouk van de Wiel (2014–2015)
- (Netherlands) Marieke van der Wal (2010)
- (Slovenia) Lina Krhlikar (2015–)
- (Slovenia) Branka Zec (2018–2020)
- (Slovenia) Maja Zrnec (2015–2016)
- (Switzerland) Nicole Dinkel (2009–2015)
- (Switzerland) Lisa Frey (2020–)
- (Switzerland) Seline Ineichen (2014–2015)
- (Switzerland) Romy Morf-Bachmann (2019–2021)
- (Switzerland) Karin Weigelt (2010–2014, 2017–2018)
- (Switzerland) Pascale Wyder (2020–)

==== Former coaches ====
Seasons	Coach	Country
2009–2013	Aleksandar Knežević	(Serbia)
2013	Nedeljko Vujinović	(Germany)
2013–2014	Vasile Oprea	(Romania)
20014–2021	Aleksandar Knežević	(Serbia)
2021–	Nico Kiener	(Germany)
