= Draško Mrvaljević =

Montenegrin handball player (born 1979)

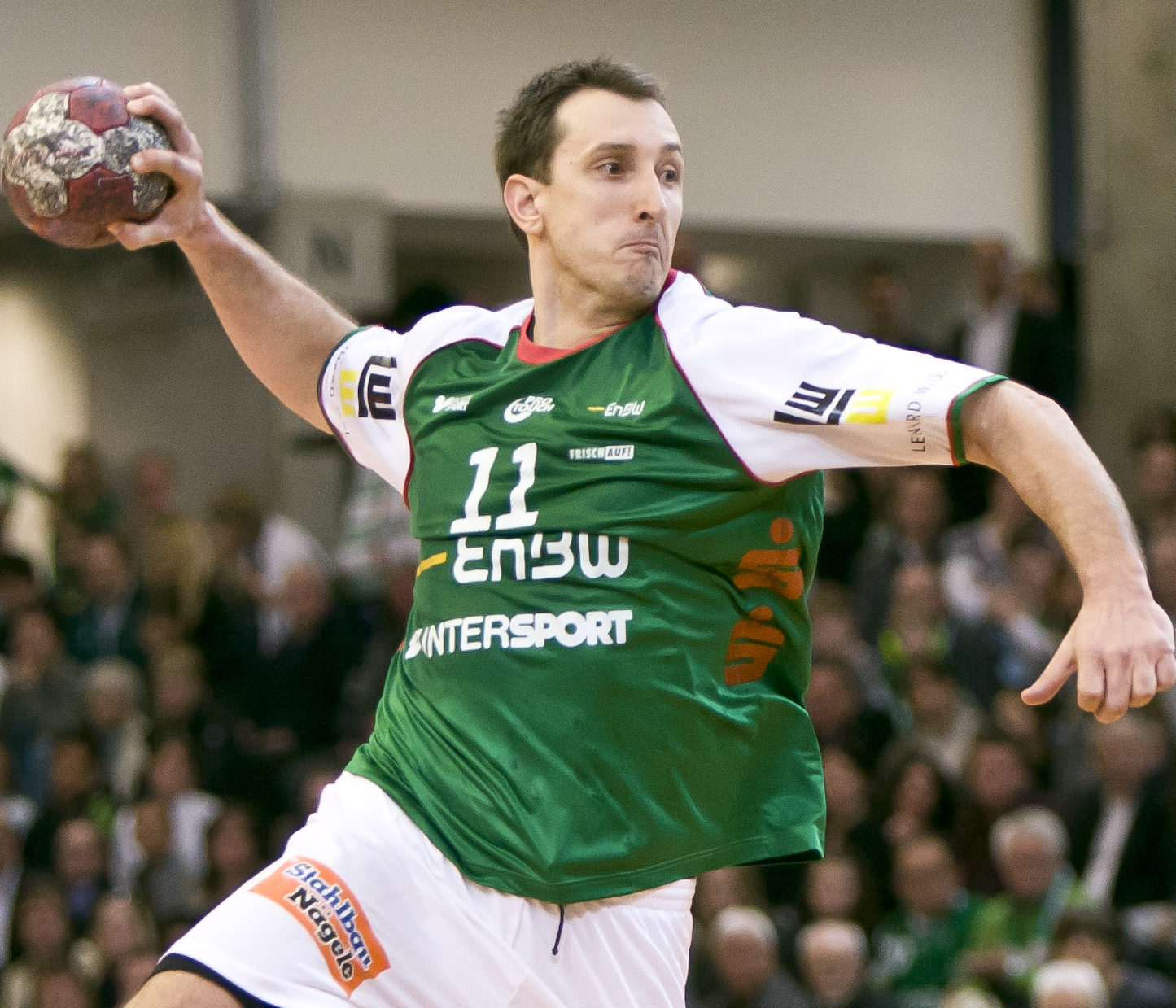
- Mrvaljević in 2011

Personal information
- Full name: Draško Mrvaljević
- Nationality: Montenegrin
- Born: 17 November 1979 (age 46) Cetinje, SFR Yugoslavia
- Height: 1.92 m (6 ft 4 in)

Sport
- Sport: Handball
- Position: Centre back

Senior clubs
- Years: Team
- 1997–2000: Lovćen
- 2000–2002: Sintelon
- 2003–2005: Teucro
- 2005–2007: Torrevieja
- 2007–2009: Koper
- 2009–2012: Frisch Auf Göppingen
- 2012–2013: Bregenz
- 2013–2014: GWD Minden
- 2014–2015: Hapoel Rishon LeZion
- 2015–2016: SG Pforzheim/Eutingen
- 2016–2018: Maccabi Rehovot
National team
Years	Team	Apps	(Gls)
2007–2013	Montenegro	40	(173)

Draško Mrvaljević (born 17 November 1979) is a Montenegrin former handball player.

== Career ==
Over the course of his career that spanned more than two decades, Mrvaljević played for Lovćen (1997–2000), Sintelon (2000–2002), Teucro (2003–2005), Torrevieja (2005–2007), Koper (2007–2009), Frisch Auf Göppingen (2009–2012), Bregenz (2012–2013), GWD Minden (2013–2014), Hapoel Rishon LeZion (2014–2015), SG Pforzheim/Eutingen (2015–2016) and Maccabi Rehovot (2016–2018). He won two consecutive EHF Cup titles with Frisch Auf Göppingen.

At international level, Mrvaljević represented Montenegro at the 2008 European Men's Handball Championship and 2013 World Men's Handball Championship. He missed the 2014 European Men's Handball Championship due to an injury.

== Honours ==
Frisch Auf Göppingen

- EHF Cup: 2010–11, 2011–12
