= Lars Kaufmann =

German handball player (born 1982)

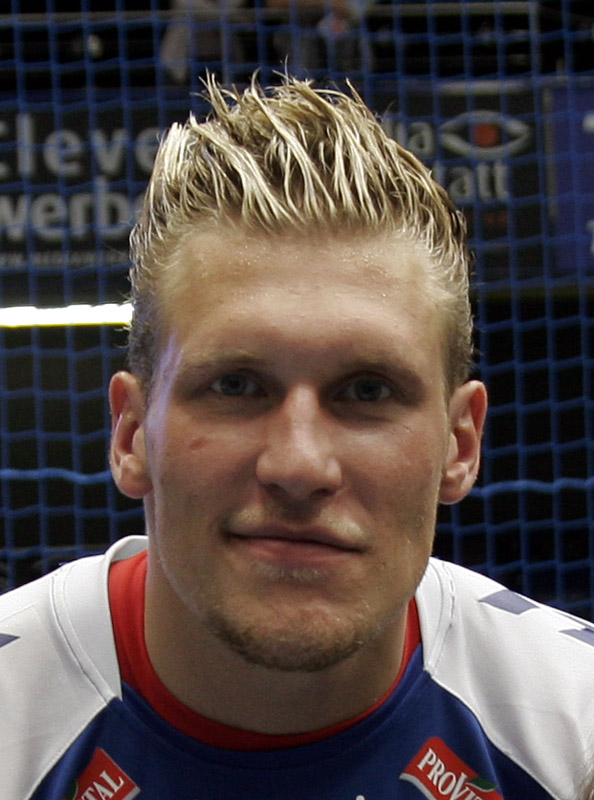
- Kaufmann in 2007

Personal information
- Nationality: German
- Born: February 25, 1982 (age 44) Görlitz, East Germany
- Height: 199 cm (78 in)

Sport
- Sport: Handball
- Position: Left back

Senior clubs
- Years: Team
- –1999: SV Koweg Görlitz
- 1999-2005: 1. SV Concordia Delitzsch
- 2005-2007: HSG Wetzlar
- 2007-2009: TBV Lemgo
- 2009-2011: Frisch Auf Göppingen
- 2011-2015: SG Flensburg-Handewitt
- 2015-2017: Frisch Auf Göppingen
National team
Years	Team	Apps	(Gls)
2003-2017	Germany	132	(322)
Medal record
Representing Germany
World Men's Handball Championship
Gold medal – first place	2007 Germany	Team Competition

Lars Kaufmann (born February 25, 1982) is a German former team handball player. He is World champion from 2007 with the German national team. He participated on the German team that finished 4th at the 2008 European Men's Handball Championship.

== Career ==
Kaufmann started playing handball at SV Koweg Görlitz, and joined 1. SV Concordia Delitzsch. Here he was the top scorer in the 2nd Bundesliga in the 2003–04 and 2004–05 seasons.

In 2005 he joined HSG Wetzlar, where he played until 2007. He then joined TBV Lemgo. In 2009 he joined Frisch Auf Göppingen, where he won the 2010–11 EHF Cup. Afterwards he joined SG Flensburg-Handewitt, where he won the 2012 EHF Cup Winners' Cup. Due to knee injuries he missed the entire 2013–14 season. In his absence Flensburg-Handewitt won the EHF Champions League. In 2015 he won the DHB-Pokal.

In 2015 he returned to Frisch Auf Göppingen. Here he won the 2016 and 2017 EHF European League. After the 2016–17 season he retired.

=== National team ===
Kaufmann made his debut for the German national team on 4 January 2003 against Hungary. In 2007 he won the World Championship, for which he was awarded the Silbernes Lorbeerblatt.
