= 1958–59 European Cup (handball) =

European men's club handball tournament

European Cup
- 1958–59

Tournament information
- Sport: Handball
- Dates: 11 January 1959–18 April 1959
- Administrator: IHF
- Participants: 14
- Defending champions: HC Dukla Prague

Final positions
- Champions: Redbergslids Goteborg
- Runner-up: Frisch Auf Göoppingen

Tournament statistics
- Matches played: 13

The 1958–59 European Cup was the second edition of Europe's premier club handball tournament. Redbergslids Goteborg won the tournament as the first and to date only team from Scandinavia.

== Knockout stage ==
=== Round 1 ===
Team 1	Score	Team 2
ROC Flemallois (Belgium)	10–11	(France) Asprom Bordeaux
IF Helsingør (Denmark)	21–14	(Finland) Union Helsinki
BM Granollers (Spain)	17–12	(Portugal) FC Porto
Dukla Prague (Czechoslovakia)	wo	(Poland) Sparta Katowice
Partizan Bjelovar (Socialist Federal Republic of Yugoslavia)	5–17	(Romania) Dinamo Bucuresti
BTV St. Gallen (Switzerland)	28–19	(Luxembourg) SC Esch
Frisch Auf Goppingen (West Germany)	24–16	(Netherlands) Olympia Eangelo

=== Quarterfinals ===
Team 1	Score	Team 2
Redbergslids Goteborg (Sweden)	26–14	(France) Asprom Bordeaux
IF Helsingør (Denmark)	34–14	(Spain) BM Granollers
Dinamo Bucuresti (Romania)	15–14	(Czechoslovakia) Dukla Prague
Frisch Auf Goppingen (West Germany)	31–26	(Switzerland) BTV St. Gallen

=== Semifinals ===
Team 1	Score	Team 2
Redbergslids Goteborg (Sweden)	22–12	(Denmark) IF Helsingør
Frisch Auf Goppingen (West Germany)	21–12	(Romania) Dinamo Bucuresti

=== Finals ===
Team 1	Score	Team 2
Redbergslids Goteborg (Sweden)	18–13	(West Germany) Frisch Auf Goppingen
