= Wendy Smits =

Dutch handball player (1983–2022)

Personal information
- Nationality: Dutch
- Born: 22 January 1983 Amsterdam, Netherlands
- Died: 9 October 2022 (aged 39)

Sport
- Sport: Handball
- Position: Left back, centre back
National team
Years	Team	Apps
–	Netherlands	14

Wendy Smits (22 January 1983 – 9 October 2022) was an international Dutch handball player.

== Career ==
Smits moved in 2005 from HV SEW to Germany and played with TuS Metzingen, HSG Sulzbach Leidersbach and Frisch Auf Göppingen. She moved back to the Netherlands and played with SV Dalfsen Handbal between 2009 and 2012. After playing for the last three months in 2012 with HSG Blomberg-Lippe she played from 2013 with Fortissimo. At the end of December 2015, she moved to Foreholte due to a conflict with her coach Kees Boomhouwer.

Smits also played 14 matches for the Netherlands women's national handball team. She was assistant coach of the under-16 national women's team.

Smits was married and had a daughter. They lived in Almere. Due to a serious illness, Smits died in October 2022 at 39 years old.
