= Marcel Schiller =

German handball player (born 1991)

Marcel Schillerr
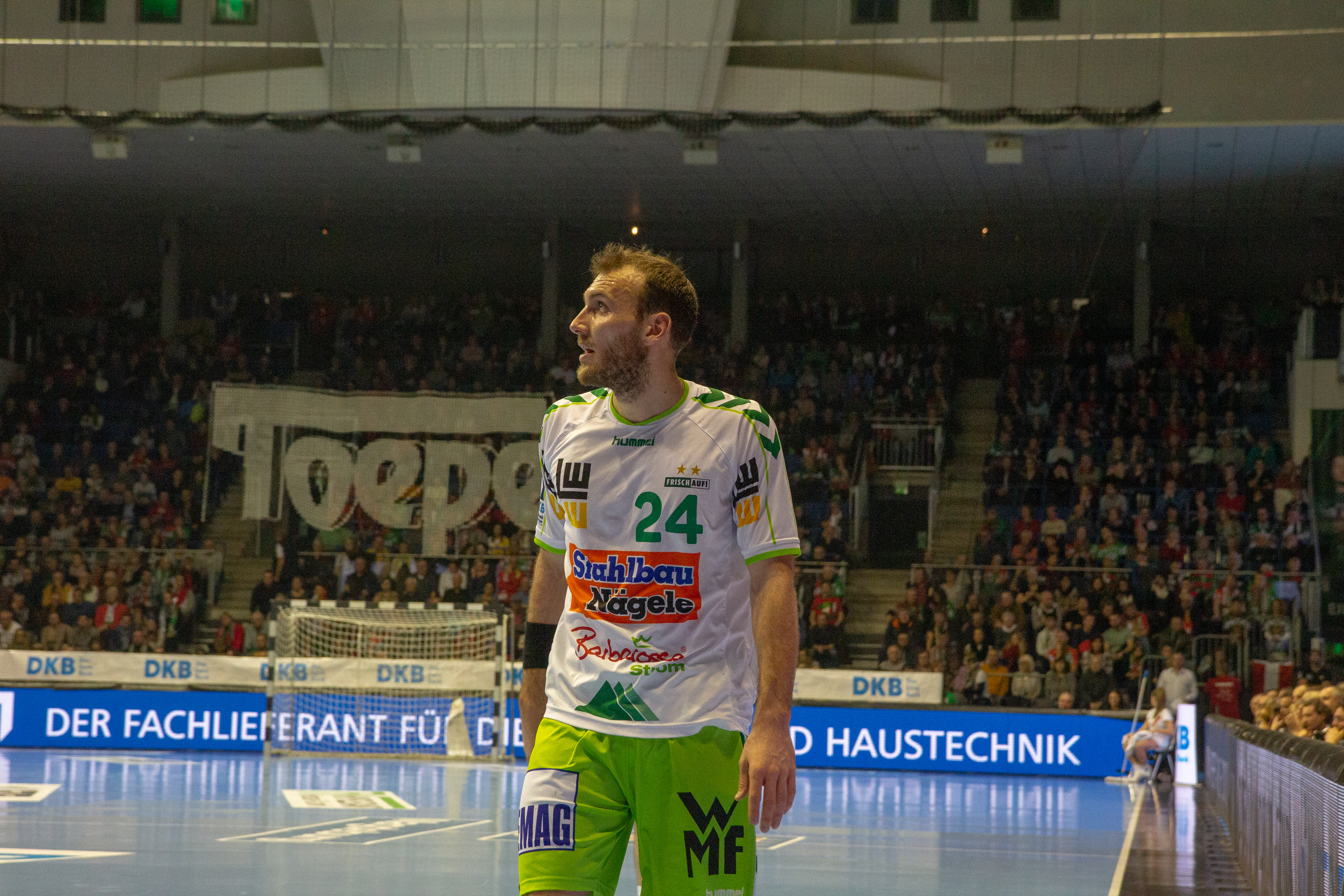

Personal information
- Nationality: German
- Born: 15 August 1991 (age 35) Bad Urach, Germany
- Height: 1.89 m (6 ft 2 in)

Sport
- Sport: Handball
- Position: Left wing
- Current club: Frisch Auf Göppingen
- Number: 24

Senior clubs
- Years: Team
- 2008–2013: TV 1893 Neuhausen
- 2013–: Frisch Auf Göppingen
National team
Years	Team	Apps	(Gls)
2017–	Germany	39	(161)
- Updated on 11 August 2024

Marcel Schillerr (born 15 August 1991) is a German handballer who plays for Frisch Auf Göppingen and the German national team.

== International honours ==
- EHF European League:
  - Winner: 2016, 2017
  - Bronze medal: 2023
