= Manuel Späth =

German handball player (born 1985)

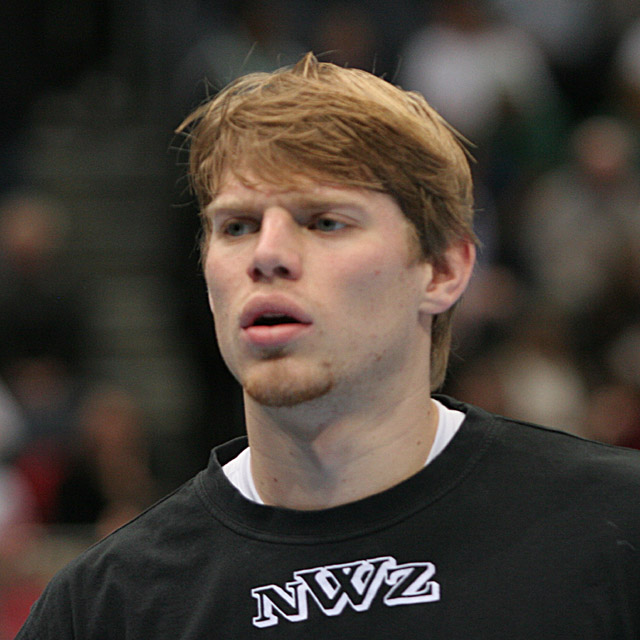
- Späth in 2008

Personal information
- Nationality: German
- Born: 16 October 1985 (age 41) Ostfildern, West Germany
- Height: 2.00 m (6 ft 7 in)

Sport
- Sport: Handball
- Position: Pivot
- Current club: HSV Hamburg
- Number: 9

Senior clubs
- Years: Team
- –2004: TB Ruit
- 2004–2006: TSV Neuhausen
- 2006–2017: Frisch Auf Göppingen
- 2017–2020: TVB 1898 Stuttgart
- 2020–2021: FC Porto
- 2021–: HSV Hamburg
National team
Years	Team	Apps	(Gls)
2008–	Germany	33	(37)

Manuel Späth (born 16 October 1985) is a German handballer who plays as a pivot for HSV Hamburg and the German national team.
