= Urh Kastelic =

Slovenian handball player (born 1996)

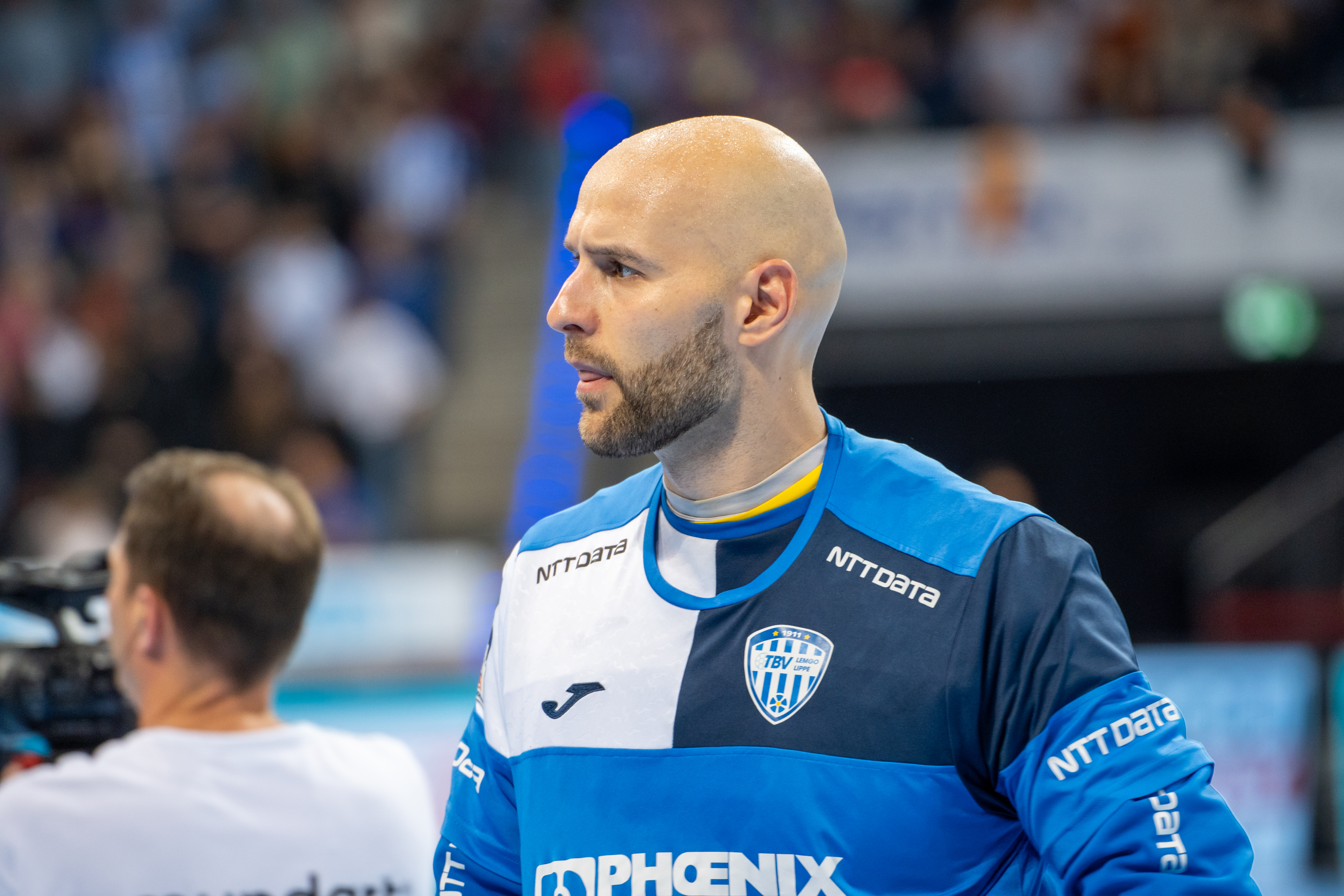
- Kastelic with TBV Lemgo Lippe in 2024

Personal information
- Nationality: Slovenian
- Born: 27 February 1996 (age 30) Brežice, Slovenia
- Height: 2.01 m (6 ft 7 in)

Sport
- Sport: Handball
- Position: Goalkeeper
- Current club: RK Zagreb

Youth career
- Years: Team
- 2006–2012: RK Krško
- 2010–2011: → RK Brežice (loan)

Senior clubs
- Years: Team
- 2012: RK Krško
- 2012–2017: RK Celje
- 2013–2014: → RD Slovan (loan)
- 2015–2017: → RK Maribor Branik (loan)
- 2017: → SC Pick Szeged (loan)
- 2017–2019: RK Zagreb
- 2019–2022: Frisch Auf Göppingen
- 2022–2026: TBV Lemgo Lippe
- 2026–: RK Zagreb
National team
Years	Team	Apps	(Gls)
2016–	Slovenia	59	(7)
Medal record
World Championship
Bronze medal – third place	2017 France
- Updated on 5 February 2026

Urh Kastelic (born 27 February 1996) is a Slovenian handball goalkeeper who plays for RK Zagreb and the Slovenia national team.

With Slovenia, Kastelic participated at the 2017 World Men's Handball Championship. In 2014, he won a gold medal at the Youth Olympic Games in Nanjing, China.
