= Kévynn Nyokas =

French handball player (born 1986)

Alix Nyokas
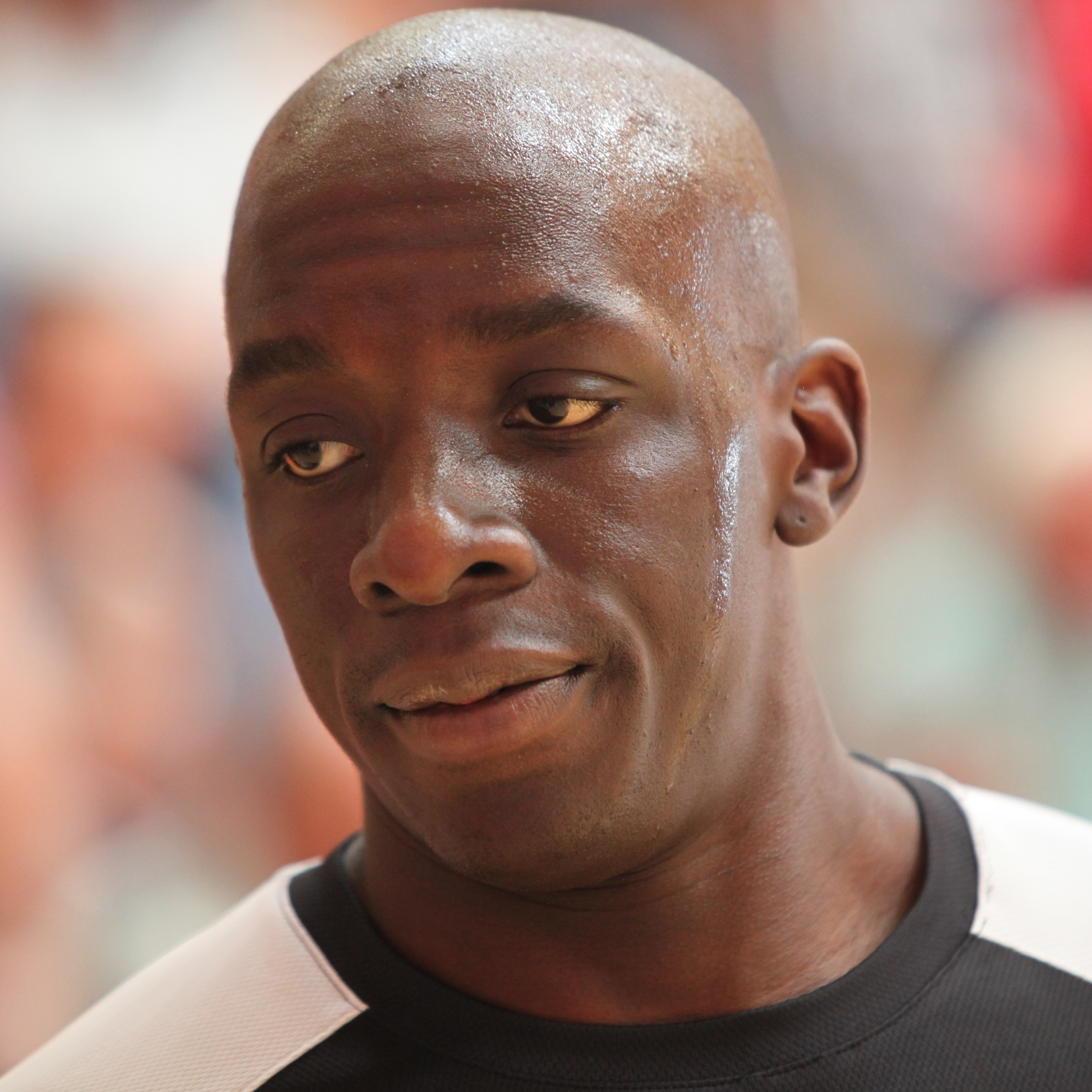
- Nyokas in August 2014

Personal information
- Full name: Alix Kévynn Nyokas
- Nationality: French/Congolese
- Born: 28 June 1986 (age 40) Montfermeil, France
- Height: 1.88 m (6 ft 2 in)

Sport
- Sport: Handball
- Position: Right back
- Current club: Al-Ahli SC
- Number: 10

Youth career
- Years: Team
- 2002-2004: ES Montgeron
- 2004-2006: UMS Pontault-Combault HB

Senior clubs
- Years: Team
- 2006-2010: Paris HB
- 2010-2011: Dijon Bourgogne HB
- 2011-2012: Paris HB
- 2012-2014: Chambéry Savoie HB
- 2014-2016: Frisch Auf Göppingen
- 2016-2017: VfL Gummersbach
- 2018-2021: S.L. Benfica
- 2021-9/2021: RK Metalurg Skopje
- 2021-2022: RK Vardar Skopje
- 2022: Al-Najma
- 2022-: Al-Ahli Jeddah
National team
Years	Team	Apps	(Gls)
–	France	41	(57)
2022–	DR Congo		
Medal record
Representing France
Men's handball
World Championship
Gold medal – first place	2015 Qatar	Team
European Championship
Gold medal – first place	2014 Denmark	Team

Alix Kévynn Nyokas (born 28 June 1986) is a French-born Congolese handball player for Al-Ahli SC and the Congolese national team. At international level, he also played for the France national team, with whom he won the 2015 World Championship and the 2014 European Championship.

He is the twin brother of fellow handballer Olivier Nyokas.

== Career ==
Nyokas started his career at Paris Saint Germain, and then played for Dijon Bourgogne HB in the 2010–11 season. In 2012 he joined Chambéry Savoie HB. In 2014 he joined German side Frisch Auf Göppingen. In 2016 he joined league rivals VfL Gummersbach.

After the 2016–17 season, Nyokas retired from playing handball. However, on 4 September 2018, he returned to professional handball as a player of Portuguese side S.L. Benfica. In 2021 he joined North Macedonian team RK Metalurg Skopje together with his twin brother Olivier Nyokas. The very same season he joined city rivals RK Vardar Skopje. Here he won the 2022 North Macedonian Cup and Championship.

He then joined Qatari team Al-Najma. In August 2022 he joined Greek champions Olympiacos CFP. In August 2022 he joined Al-Ahli Jeddah in Saudi-Arabia.

== National team ==
Nyokas debuted for the France national team in June 2011. With them he won the 2015 World Championship and the 2014 European Championship.

He then changed to represent DR Congo from 2022 onwards, and represented them at the 2022 African Championship.

=== Honors ===
- Macedonian Handball Super League

Winner: 2022

- Macedonian Handball Cup

Winner: 2022
