= Jacob Bagersted =

Danish handballer (born 1987)

Personal information
- Full name: Jacob Haubirk-Bagersted
- Nationality: Danish
- Born: 25 March 1987 (age 39) Copenhagen, Denmark
- Height: 1.96 m (6 ft 5 in)

Sport
- Sport: Handball
- Position: Pivot
- Current club: SønderjyskE Håndbold
- Number: 14

Senior clubs
- Years: Team
- –2008: Ajax København
- 2008–2010: FCK Håndbold
- 2010–2011: AG København
- 2011–2014: Aalborg Håndbold
- 2014–2017: SC Magdeburg
- 2017–2022: Frisch Auf Göppingen
- 2022–2026: SønderjyskE Håndbold
National team
| Years | Team | Apps | (Gls) |
| 2007–2018 | Denmark | 32 | (48) |
Medal record
Representing Denmark
World Championship
| Silver medal – second place | 2011 Sweden | Team |
- Updated on 11 March 2026

Jacob Bagersted (born 25 March 1987) is a Danish handballer, currently playing for Danish side SønderjyskE Håndbold. He has previously played for German sides SC Magdeburg and Frisch Auf Göppingen.

He debuted for the Danish national handball team in 2007 at the age of 20. In 2011 he won World Cup silver medals with the Danish team, but would during his career fade out of contention for the Danish national team.

== Club career ==
He started his career at Ajax Heroes in Copenhagen in the Danish second tier. In 2008 he signed a three-year contract with FCK Handball. When AG AG København took over most of FCK's players, Bagersted went along. Here he won the Danish Championship in 2011 with AG København. In 2011 he joined league rivals Aalborg Håndbold. Here he won the Danish Championship once again in 2013.

For the 2014/2015 he joined German side SC Magdeburg, where he played for three years. In the meantime he won the DHB-Pokal. In 2017 he joined Frisch Auf Göppingen, before returning to Denmark in 2022 to join SønderjyskE Håndbold. In February 2026 he announced his retirement after the 2025–26 season.
