= Niclas Barud =

Swedish handball player (born 1988)

Personal information
- Nationality: Swedish
- Born: 22 March 1988 (age 38) Partille, Sweden
- Height: 1.96 m (6 ft 5 in)

Sport
- Sport: Handball
- Position: Pivot
- Current club: Alingsås HK
- Number: 26

Senior clubs
- Years: Team
- -2004: HK Aranäs
- 2004-2012: IK Sävehof
- 2012-2015: Aalborg Håndbold
- 2015-2017: Frisch Auf Göppingen
- 2017-2022: Alingsås HK
National team
Years	Team	Apps	(Gls)
2011-2015	Sweden	46	(20)

Niclas Barud (born 22 March 1988) is a Swedish former handball player.

== Club career ==
Niclas started his career at HK Aranäs, before joining IK Sävehof in 2004. Here he won the 2010, 2011 and 2012 Elitserien. He then represented Aalborg Håndbold in Denmark for three years where he won the Danish championship in 2013. After his years in Denmark, he played 2 years in Germany and for Frisch Auf Göppingen in the Bundesliga. In Göppingen he won the Euro League twice. In 2017 he returned to Sweden to join Alingsås HK. After the 2021-22 season he retired.

== National team ==
He has also represented the Swedish national team. He was a part of the team at the 2014 European Men's Handball Championship, where Sweden finished 12th, and at the 2015 World Men's Handball Championship.
