= Aleksandar Knežević =

Serbian handball player (born 1968)

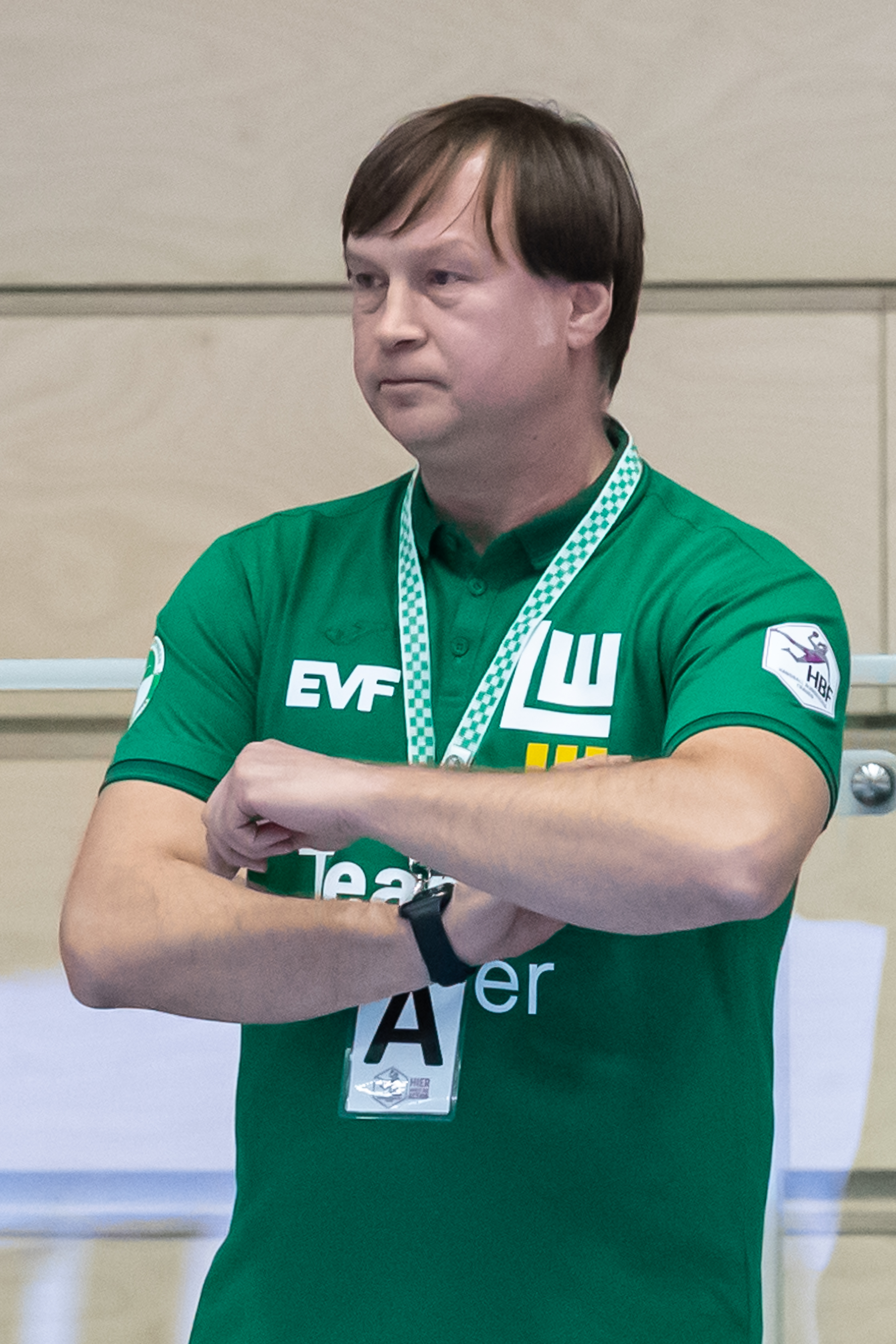

Personal information
- Full name: Aleksandar Knežević
- Nationality: Serbian
- Born: 26 December 1968 (age 57) Banja Luka, SR Bosnia-Herzegovina, SFR Yugoslavia
- Height: 1.90 m (6 ft 3 in)

Sport
- Sport: Handball
- Position: Right back
- Current club: Frisch Auf Frauen (head coach)

Senior clubs
- Years: Team
- –: Borac Banja Luka
- 1992–1993: Crvena zvezda
- 1993–1994: USM Gagny
- 1994–1995: Conquense
- 1995–1996: Partizan
- 1996–1998: BSV Borba Luzern
- 1998–1999: Partizan
- 1999–2007: Frisch Auf Göppingen
National team
- Years: Team
- 1990–1992: Yugoslavia
- 1995–2000: FR Yugoslavia

Teams managed
- 2009–2013: Frisch Auf Frauen
- 2013–2014: Frisch Auf Göppingen
- 2014–: Frisch Auf Frauen
Medal record
Men's handball
Representing Yugoslavia
Goodwill Games
Silver medal – second place	1990 Seattle	Team
Mediterranean Games
Gold medal – first place	1991 Athens	Team
Representing FR Yugoslavia
European Championship
Bronze medal – third place	1996 Spain	Team

Aleksandar Knežević (Serbian Cyrillic: Александар Кнежевић; born 26 December 1968) is a Serbian former handball player and current coach.

== Club career ==
Over the course of his career that spanned more than two decades, Knežević played for Borac Banja Luka, Crvena zvezda (1992–1993), USM Gagny (1993–1994), Conquense (1994–1995), Partizan (1995–1996 and 1998–1999), BSV Borba Luzern (1996–1998) and Frisch Auf Göppingen (1999–2007).

== International career ==
Knežević represented FR Yugoslavia in the 2000 Summer Olympics. He was also a member of the team that won the bronze medal at the 1996 European Championship.

== Honours ==
Borac Banja Luka

- Yugoslav Handball Cup: 1991–92
- EHF Cup: 1990–91

Partizan

- Handball Championship of FR Yugoslavia: 1998–99
