= Thomas Kristensen (handballer) =

Norwegian handball player (born 1990)

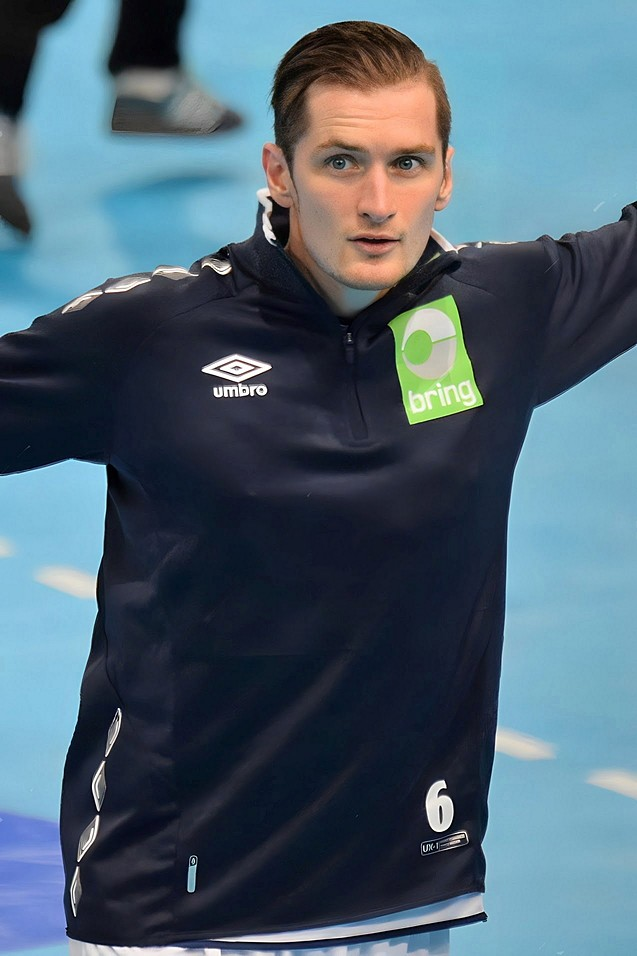
- 10 January 2016

Personal information
- Nationality: Norwegian
- Born: 2 May 1990 (age 36) Bærum, Norway
- Height: 1.97 m (6 ft 6 in)

Sport
- Sport: Handball
- Position: Right wing
- Current club: Haslum HK
- Number: 20
National team
Years	Team	Apps	(Gls)
2011–2016	Norway	39	(26)

Thomas Kristensen (born 2 May 1990) is a Norwegian handball player. He plays for Haslum HK and the Norwegian national team. He has spent his entire career in Haslum, except for the seasons 2014–2015 in Ademar León and 2015–2016 in Frisch Auf Göppingen.

As of 2016 he currently has 8 gold medals from the Norwegian league with Haslum HK and 1 gold medal from the EHF-cup with Frisch Auf Göppingen.

He competed at the 2016 European Men's Handball Championship.
