= Uwe Rathjen =

West German handball player (1943–2019)

Uwe Rathjen (28 June 1943 in Kiel – 14 November 2019) was a West German former handball player who competed in the 1972 Summer Olympics.

In 1972 he was part of the West German team which finished sixth in the Olympic tournament. He played four matches as goalkeeper.

He played for MTV Itzehoe until 1968 and then for Frisch Auf Göppingen from 1968 to 1973. He won the German Championship twice with Frisch Auf, in 1970 and 1972.
