= Jens Schöngarth =

German handball player (born 1988)

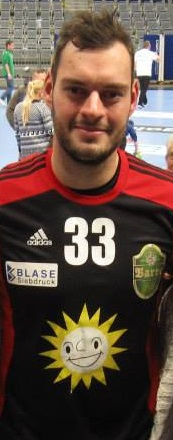

Personal information
- Nationality: German
- Born: 7 December 1988 (age 37) Emmendingen, Germany
- Height: 2.03 m (6 ft 8 in)

Sport
- Sport: Handball
- Position: Right back

Senior clubs
- Years: Team
- 2006–2007: SG Köndringen/Teningen
- 2007–2009: TV Willstätt
- 2009–2012: MT Melsungen
- 2012–2016: TuS Nettelstedt-Lübbecke
- 2016: SC Magdeburg
- 2016–2019: Frisch Auf Göppingen
- 2019–2020: Handball Sport Verein Hamburg
- 2020: → SG Flensburg-Handewitt
- 2020–2023: Sporting CP
- 2023: Balingen-Weilstetten
National team
Years	Team	Apps	(Gls)
2015–2020	Germany	18	(28)

Jens Schöngarth (born 7 December 1988) is a former German handball player for the German national team.
