= Bart Ravensbergen =

Dutch handball player (born 1993)

Personal information
- Nationality: Dutch
- Born: 14 March 1993 (age 33) Voorschoten, Netherlands
- Height: 1.90 m (6 ft 3 in)

Sport
- Sport: Handball
- Position: Goalkeeper
- Current club: Frisch Auf Göppingen
- Number: 1

Senior clubs
- Years: Team
- 2015–2018: Sélestat Alsace
- 2018–2023: HSG Nordhorn-Lingen
- 2023–: Frisch Auf Goppingen
National team
Years	Team	Apps	(Gls)
2014–	Netherlands	105	(16)
- Updated on 31 January 2024

Bart Ravensbergen (born 14 March 1993) is a Dutch handball player in the German Bundesliga for Frisch Auf! Göppingen. He is the goalkeeper of the Dutch national team.

He represented the Netherlands at the 2023 World Men's Handball Championship and at three European Championships including their inaugural tournament in 2020.

In 2023/24 season of Handball Bundesliga he set the Handball Bundesliga record for most goals in a season by a goalkeeper with 9 goals, which was later surpassed by Sergey Hernández. And he jointly holds record for most goals by a goalkeeper in a Handball Bundesliga match with 3.
