= Michael Haaß =

German handball player (born 1983)

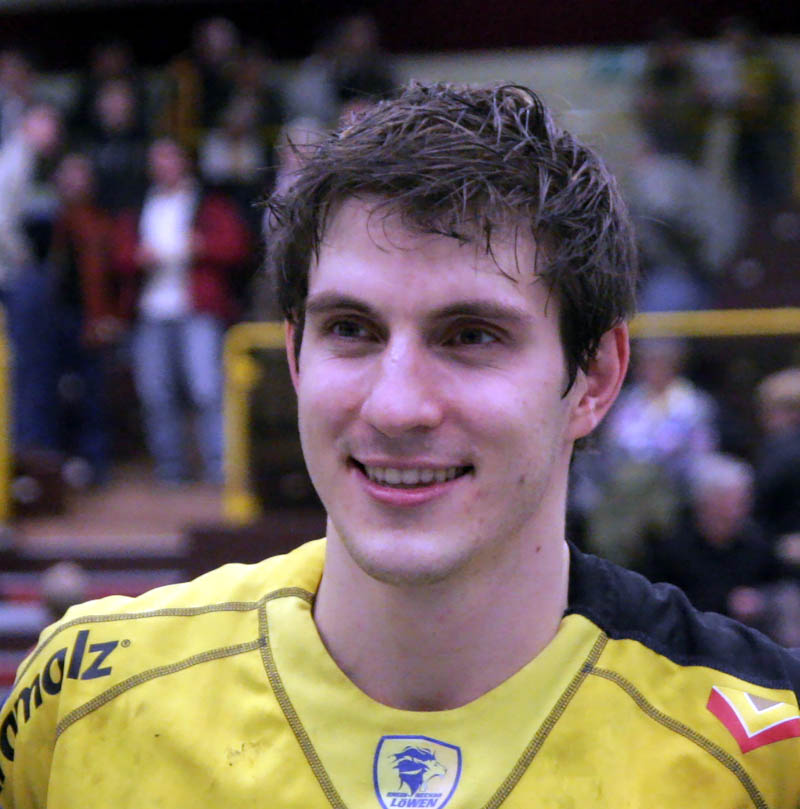
- Michael Haaß on 28 November 2006

Personal information
- Nationality: Germany
- Born: December 12, 1983 (age 42) Essen, Germany
- Height: 194 cm (76 in)

Sport
- Sport: Handball
- Position: Centre back

Youth career
- Years: Team
- –: VfB Frohnhausen
- -1993: TV Cronenberg
- 1993-2001: TUSEM Essen

Senior clubs
- Years: Team
- 2001-2005: TUSEM Essen
- 2005-2006: HSG Düsseldorf
- 2005-2006: Rhein-Neckar Löwen
- 2007-2009: GWD Minden
- 2009-2013: Frisch Auf Göppingen
- 2013-2016: SC Magdeburg
- 2016-2020: HC Erlangen
National team
Years	Team	Apps	(Gls)
2006–2016	Germany	120	(180)

Teams managed
- 2020–2022: HC Erlangen
- 2022–2024: TuS Nettelstedt-Lübbecke
Medal record
World Championship
Gold medal – first place	2007 Germany	Team

Michael Haaß (born 12 December 1983 in Essen) is a former German handball player and current coach.

He won gold medals at the World Cup in 2007, for which he was awarded the Silbernes Lorbeerblatt.

== Career ==
Haaß started playing handball at 10. From 1993 he played for TUSEM Essen where he joined the 1st team in 2001. Here he won the EHF Cup in 2005. He then joined HSG Düsseldorf, and after a season Rhein-Neckar Löwen. He stood in the German Cup final with Rhein-Neckar Löwen in 2007. The following summer he joined Frisch Auf Göppingen, where he once again won the EHF Cup in 2011 and 2012. In 2013 he joined SC Magdeburg, where he played for three years. He then joined HC Erlangen.

=== National team ===
Haaß made his debut for the German national team on April 14th, 2006 against Denmark.

He represented Germany at the 2008 Summer Olympics in Beijing, where the German team placed 9th, EURO 2010, World Cup 2011 and EURO 2012

== Coaching career ==
From 2019 he became the assistant coach at HC Erlangen. From 28 February 2020 he overtook the head coach position at the club together with Kevin Schmidt. From the 2020-21 he became the sole head coach. In January 2022 he was relieved of his duties at the club.

From the 2022-23 season he became the head coach at the 2nd Bundesliga team TuS N-Lübbecke. In September 2024 he was fired after only getting 2 points from the first 4 games of the season.
