= Enid Tahirović =

Bosnian former handballer (born 1972)

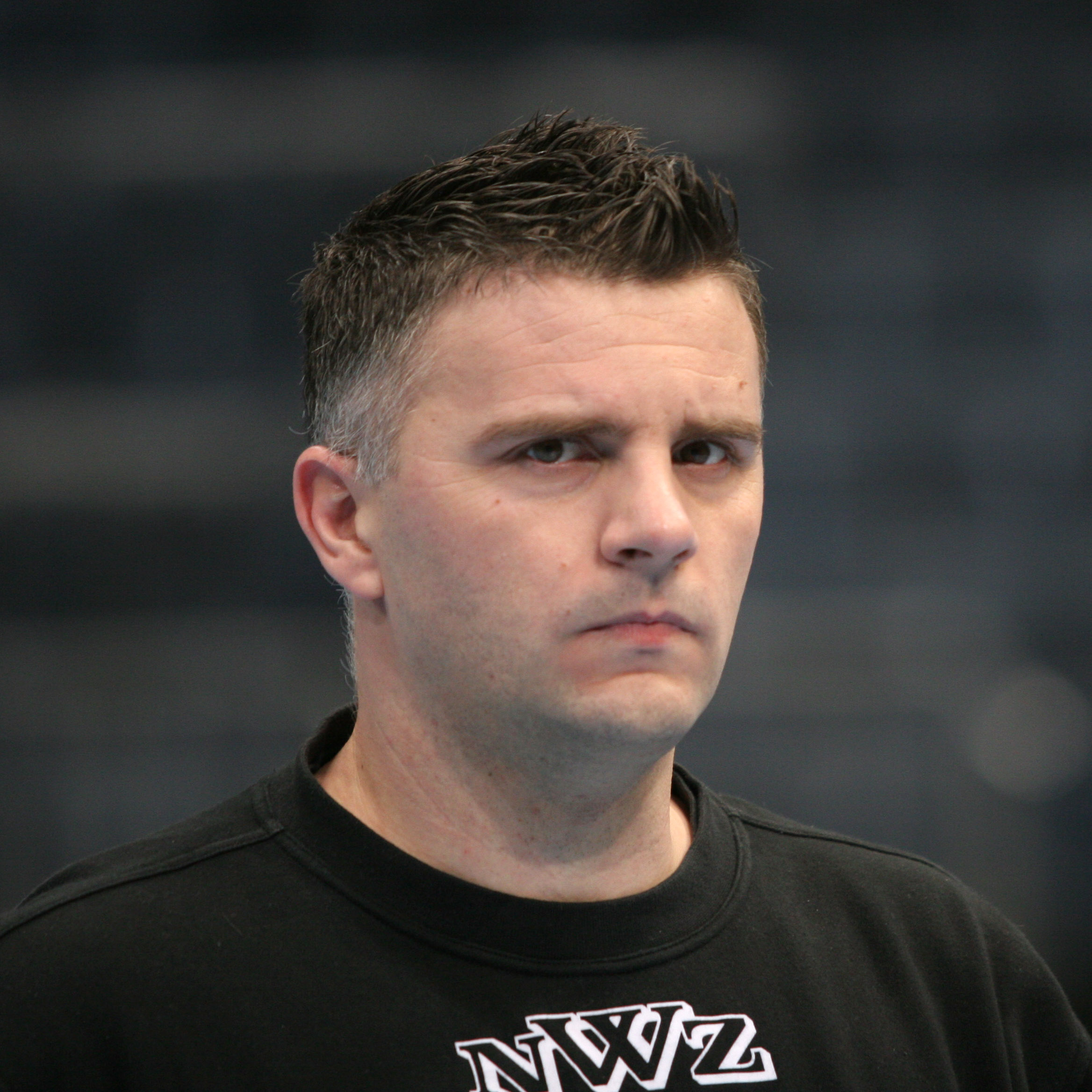

Personal information
- Born: July 22, 1972 (age 54) Bijeljina, Yugoslavia
- Height: 1.88 m (6 ft 2 in)

Sport
- Sport: Handball
- Position: Goalkeeper

Senior clubs
- Years: Team
- 1991–1992: (Socialist Federal Republic of Yugoslavia) RK Bijeljina
- 1992–1993: (Republic of Bosnia and Herzegovina) RK Sloboda Tuzla
- 1998–2003: (Bosnia and Herzegovina) RK Željezničar Sarajevo
- 2003–2007: (Bosnia and Herzegovina) RK Bosna Sarajevo
- 2007–2008: (Slovenia) RK Cimos Koper
- 2008–2012: (Germany) Frisch Auf Göppingen
- 2012: (Germany) HSV Hamburg
National team
Years	Team	Apps	(Gls)
2000–2012	Bosnia and Herzegovina	100	(1)
- Updated on April 2013 (UTC)

Enid Tahirović (born July 22, 1972) is a Bosnian former handballer. He was once considered one of the top goalkeepers in the Bundesliga. He last played in Germany for HSV Hamburg, after having spent four seasons at Frisch Auf Göppingen.
