= Vid Poteko =

Slovenian handball player (born 1991)

Personal information
- Nationality: Slovenian
- Born: 5 April 1991 (age 35) Celje, SFR Yugoslavia
- Height: 1.94 m (6 ft 4 in)

Sport
- Sport: Handball
- Position: Pivot
- Current club: Frisch Auf Göppingen
- Number: 15

Youth career
- Years: Team
- 2003–2010: RK Celje

Senior clubs
- Years: Team
- 2010–2017: RK Celje
- 2017–2019: HC Meshkov Brest
- 2019–2022: RK Celje
- 2022–: Frisch Auf Göppingen
National team
Years	Team	Apps	(Gls)
2013–	Slovenia	64	(39)
Medal record
World Championship
Bronze medal – third place	2017 France
- Updated on 16 April 2022

Vid Poteko (born 5 April 1991) is a Slovenian handball player who plays for Frisch Auf Göppingen and the Slovenia national team.

He represented Slovenia at the 2016 Summer Olympics.
