= Tim Kneule =

German handball player (born 1986)

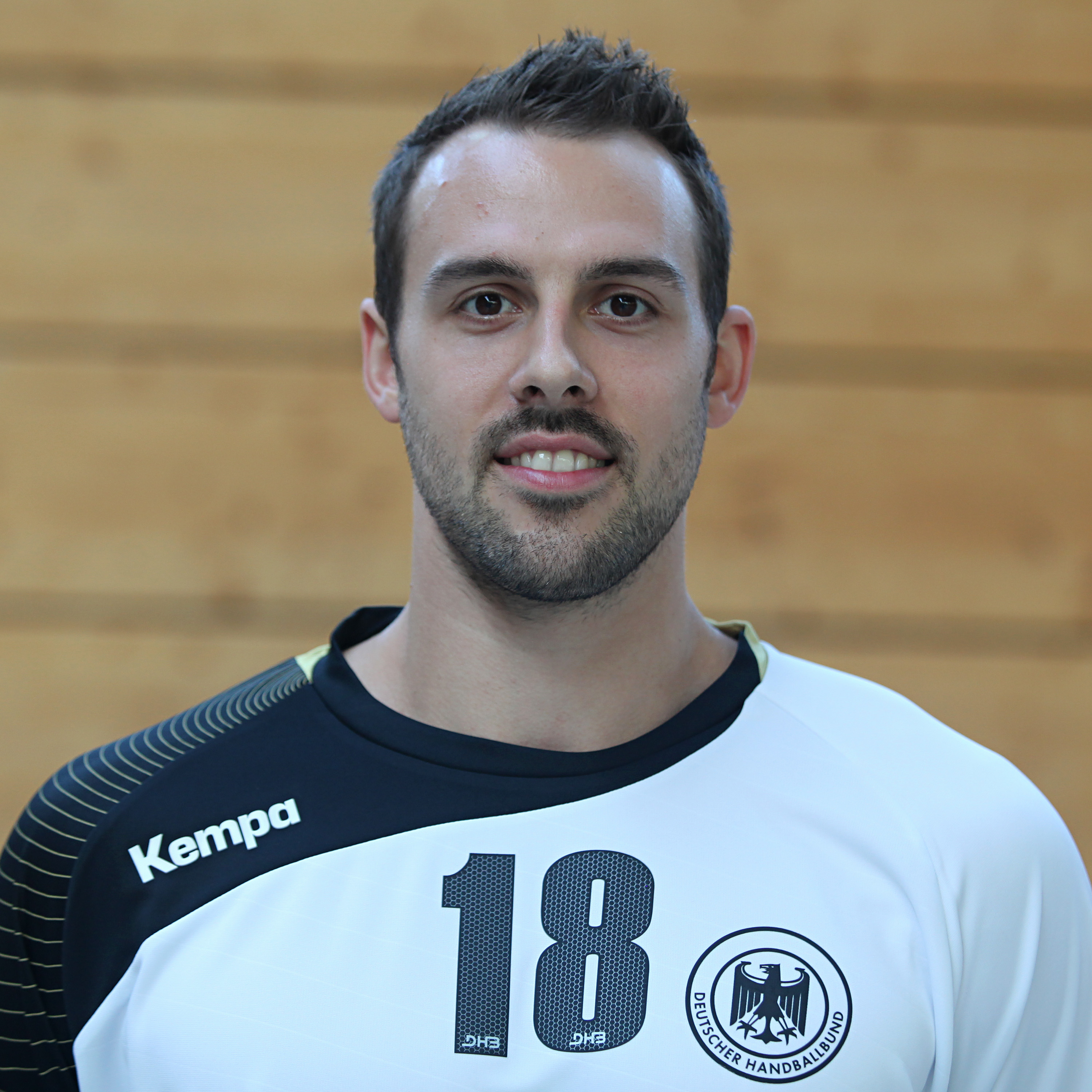

Personal information
- Nationality: German
- Born: 18 August 1986 (age 40) Reutlingen, Germany
- Height: 1.90 m (6 ft 3 in)

Sport
- Sport: Handball
- Position: Central back
- Current club: Frisch Auf Göppingen
- Number: 4

Senior clubs
- Years: Team
- –2006: TV 1893 Neuhausen
- 2006–: Frisch Auf Göppingen
National team
Years	Team	Apps	(Gls)
2012–	Germany	22	(39)

Tim Kneule (born 18 August 1986) is a German handball player for Frisch Auf Göppingen and the German national team.
