= Primož Prošt =

Slovenian handball player (born 1983)

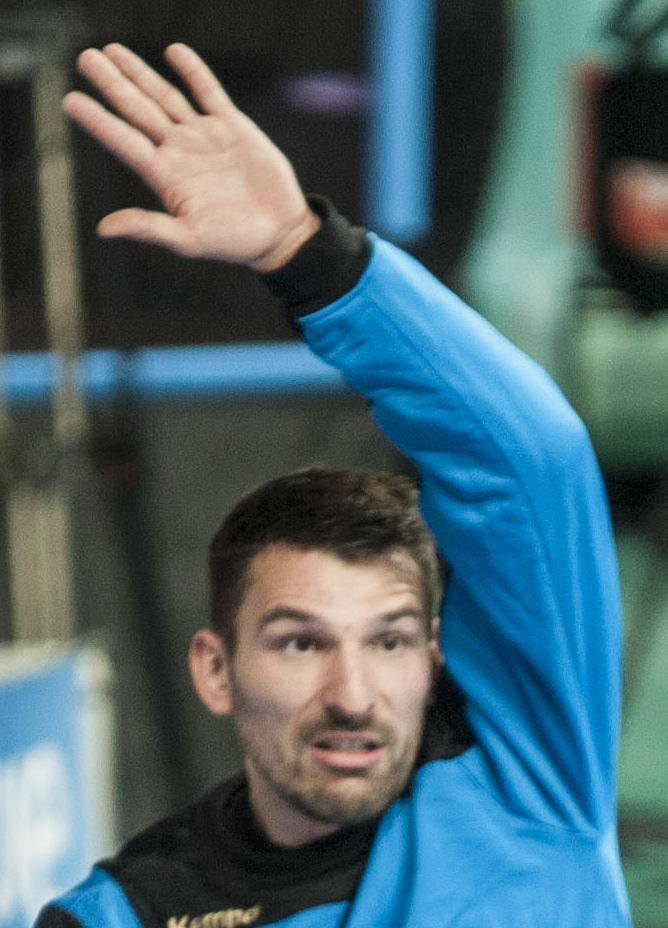

Personal information
- Full name: Primož Prošt Košir
- Nationality: Slovenian
- Born: 14 July 1983 (age 43) Trbovlje, SFR Yugoslavia
- Height: 1.86 m (6 ft 1 in)

Sport
- Sport: Handball
- Position: Goalkeeper

Senior clubs
- Years: Team
- –2004: RD Rudar Trbovlje
- 2004–2008: RK Gorenje Velenje
- 2008–2011: Bjerringbro-Silkeborg
- 2011–2012: Montpellier
- 2013–2019: Frisch Auf Göppingen
- 2020–2022: TVB 1898 Stuttgart
- 2022: IFK Ystad HK
National team
Years	Team	Apps	(Gls)
2009–2017	Slovenia	83	(0)

Primož Prošt Košir (born 14 July 1983) is a Slovenian retired handball player. He represented Slovenia at several international tournaments, both the World Men's Handball Championships and European Men's Handball Championships.
