= David Schmidt (handballer) =

German handball player (born 1993)

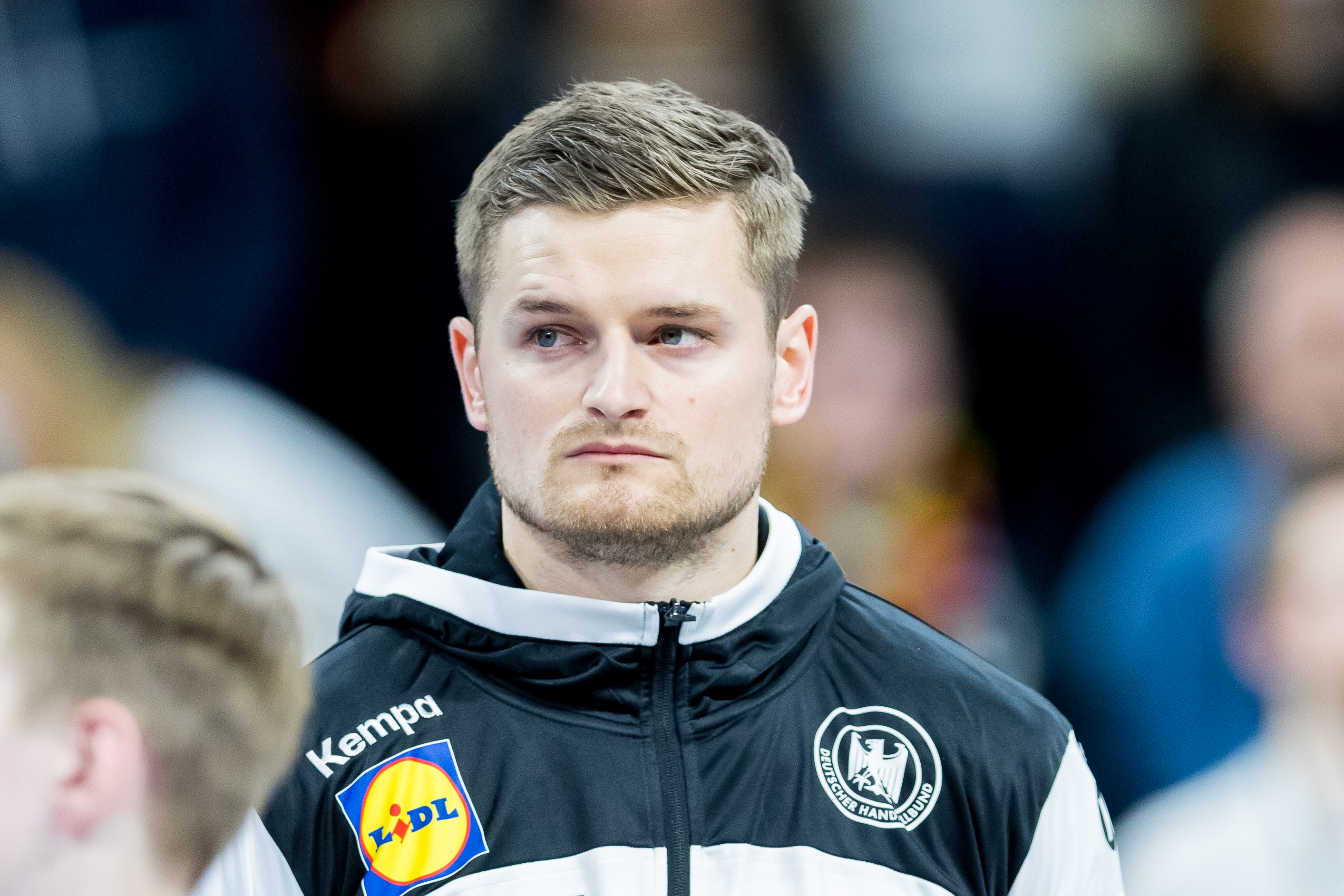

Personal information
- Nationality: German
- Born: 19 October 1993 (age 33) Karlsruhe, Germany
- Height: 1.90 m (6 ft 3 in)

Sport
- Sport: Handball
- Position: Right back
- Current club: Frisch Auf Göppingen
- Number: 77

Youth career
- Years: Team
- 2006–2008: HSG Ettlingen-Bruchhausen
- 2008–2012: Rhein-Neckar Löwen

Senior clubs
- Years: Team
- 2012–2015: Rhein-Neckar Löwen
- 2015–2018: TSG Friesenheim
- 2018–2020: TVB 1898 Stuttgart
- 2020–2022: Bergischer HC
- 2022–: Frisch Auf Göppingen
National team
Years	Team	Apps	(Gls)
2020–	Germany	25	(32)
- Updated on 2 January 2025

David Schmidt (born 19 October 1993) is a German handball player for Frisch Auf Göppingen and the German national team.

He represented Germany at the 2020 European Men's Handball Championship.
