= Gunnar Steinn Jónsson =

Icelandic handball player (born 1987)

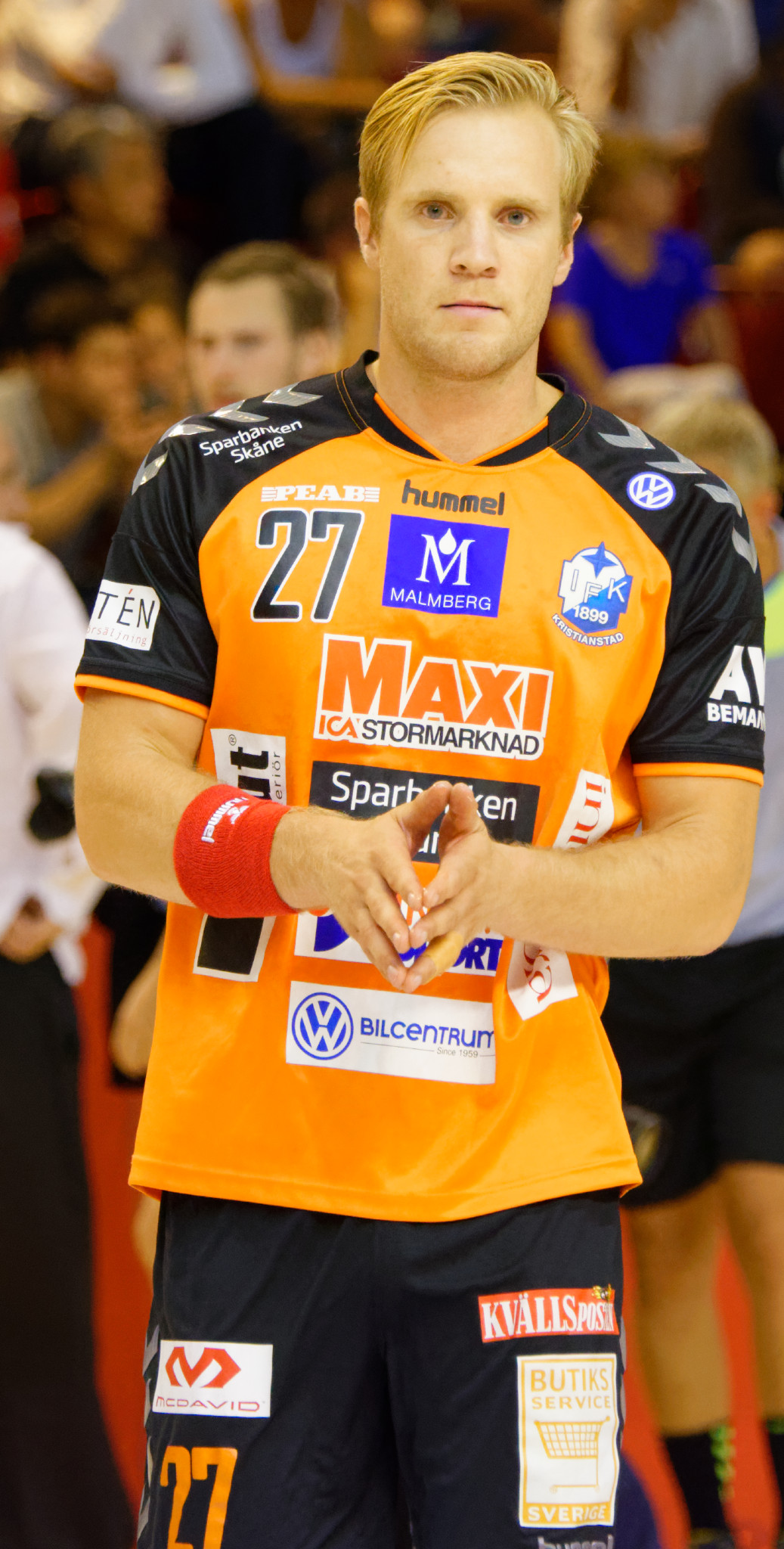
- Gunnar Steinn Jónsson playing for IFK Kristianstad in September 2016

Personal information
- Nationality: Icelandic
- Born: 4 May 1987 (age 39) Akureyri, Iceland
- Height: 1.95 m (6 ft 5 in)

Sport
- Sport: Handball
- Position: Centre back
- Current club: Fjölnir
- Number: 27

Senior clubs
- Years: Team
- –2009: HK Kópavogs
- 2009–2012: HK Drott
- 2012–2014: HBC Nantes
- 2014–2016: VfL Gummersbach
- 2016–2018: IFK Kristianstad
- 2018–2021: Ribe-Esbjerg HH
- 2021: Frisch Auf Göppingen
- 2021–2023: Stjarnan
- 2024-: Fjölnir
National team
Years	Team	Apps	(Gls)
–	Iceland	36	(30)

Gunnar Steinn Jónsson (born 4 May 1987) is an Icelandic handball player for Fjölnir and the Icelandic national team.
