= Adam Weiner =

Polish handball player (born 1975)

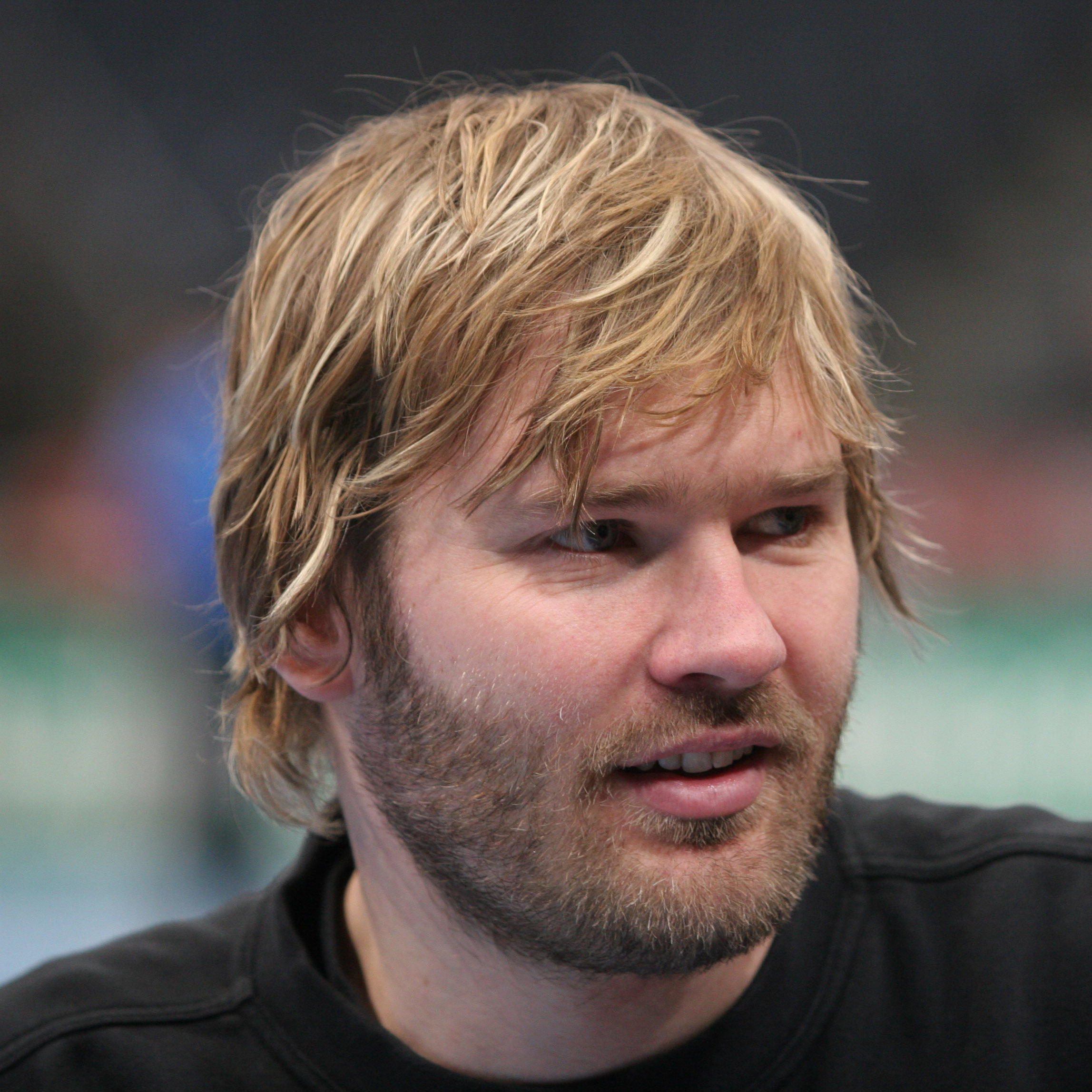

Personal information
- Nationality: Polish
- Born: March 28, 1975 (age 51) Gdynia, Poland
- Height: 1.92 m (6 ft 4 in)

Sport
- Sport: Handball
- Position: Goalkeeper

Senior clubs
- Years: Team
- –1997: Wybrzeże Gdańsk
- 1997–1999: SV Anhalt Bernburg
- 1999–2008: Wilhelmshavener HV
- 2008–2011: Frisch Auf Göppingen
- 2011–2014: TSV Hannover-Burgdorf
- 2014–2017: Wilhelmshavener HV
National team
Years	Team	Apps	(Gls)
2005–2008	Poland	57	(0)
Medal record
World Championship
Silver medal – second place	2007 Germany

Adam Weiner (born March 28, 1975) is a former Polish handball goalkeeper, member of the Poland men's national handball team and silver medalist at the 2007 World Men's Handball Championship.

== Sporting achievements ==
=== State awards ===
- 2007 Gold Cross of Merit
