= EWS Arena =

Indoor sporting arena in Göppingen, Germany

Coordinates: 48°42′39″N 9°38′53″E

- Hölle Süd
- Interactive map of EWS Arena
- Former names: Hohenstaufenhalle
- Location: Göppingen, Baden-Württemberg; Germany
- Owner: City of Göppingen
- Operator: EWS Arena Betriebsgesellschaft mbH
- Capacity: 6,344 (Boxing); 5,599 (Handball); 5,300 (Concert Seating longitudinal); 4,398 (Concert Seating transversely)

Construction
- Groundbreaking: 2007
- Built: 1967
- Expanded: July 2009
- Cost: € 16,8 million

Tenant
- Frisch Auf Göppingen (Handball) (2009)

EWS Arena (formerly Hohenstaufenhalle) is an indoor sporting arena located in Göppingen, Germany. The capacity of the arena is 5,600 people. It hosts the home matches of women's and men's Handball Bundesliga handball teams of Frisch Auf Göppingen. In its previous building, it hosted six team handball matches for the 1972 Summer Olympics in Munich. It was opened in 1967 and rebuilt and enlarged between 2007 and 2009.

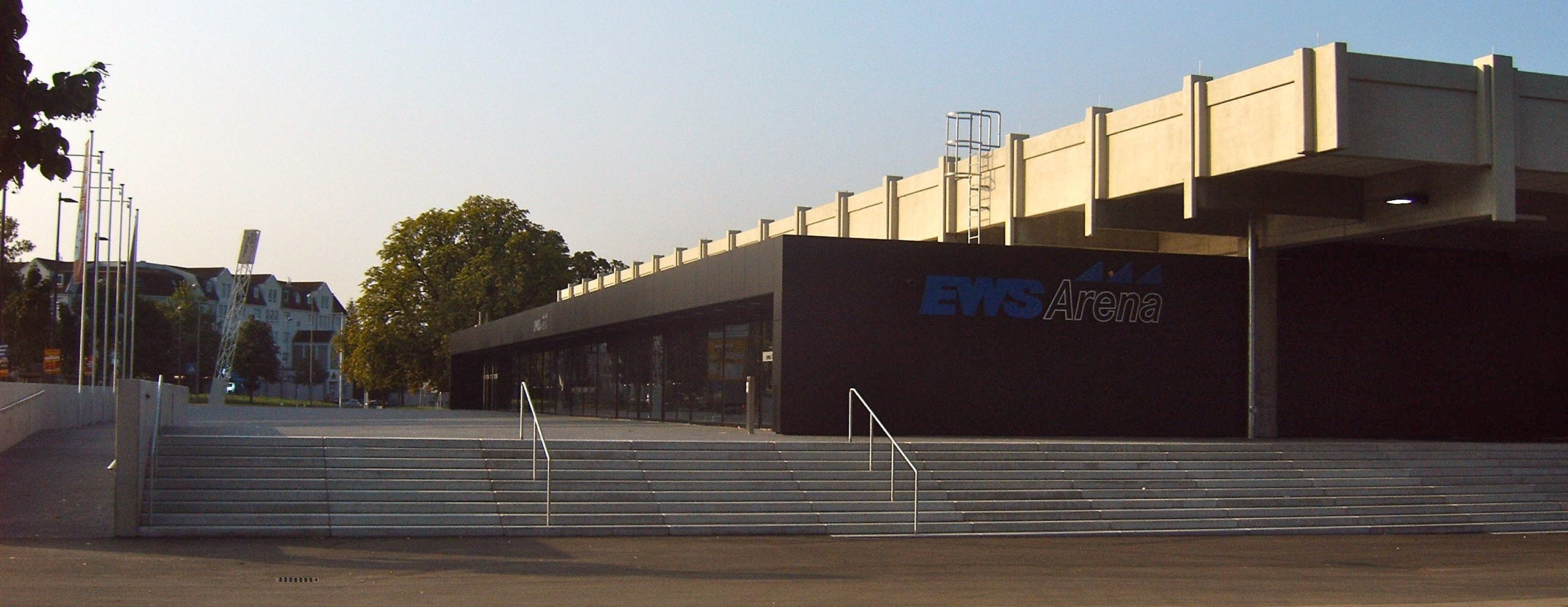
Exterior of the arena

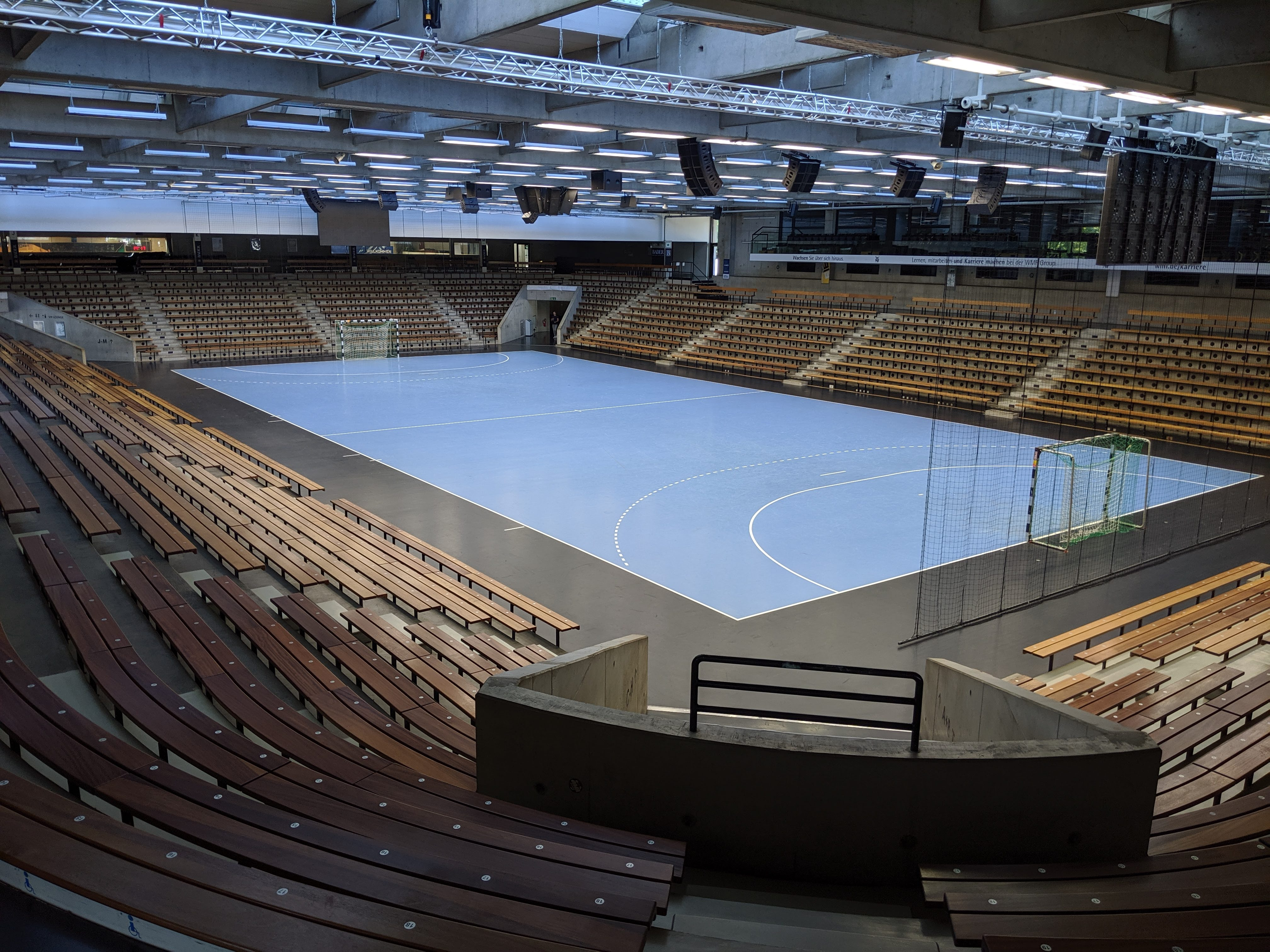
Interior
