= Ýmir Örn Gíslason =

Icelandic handball player (born 1997)

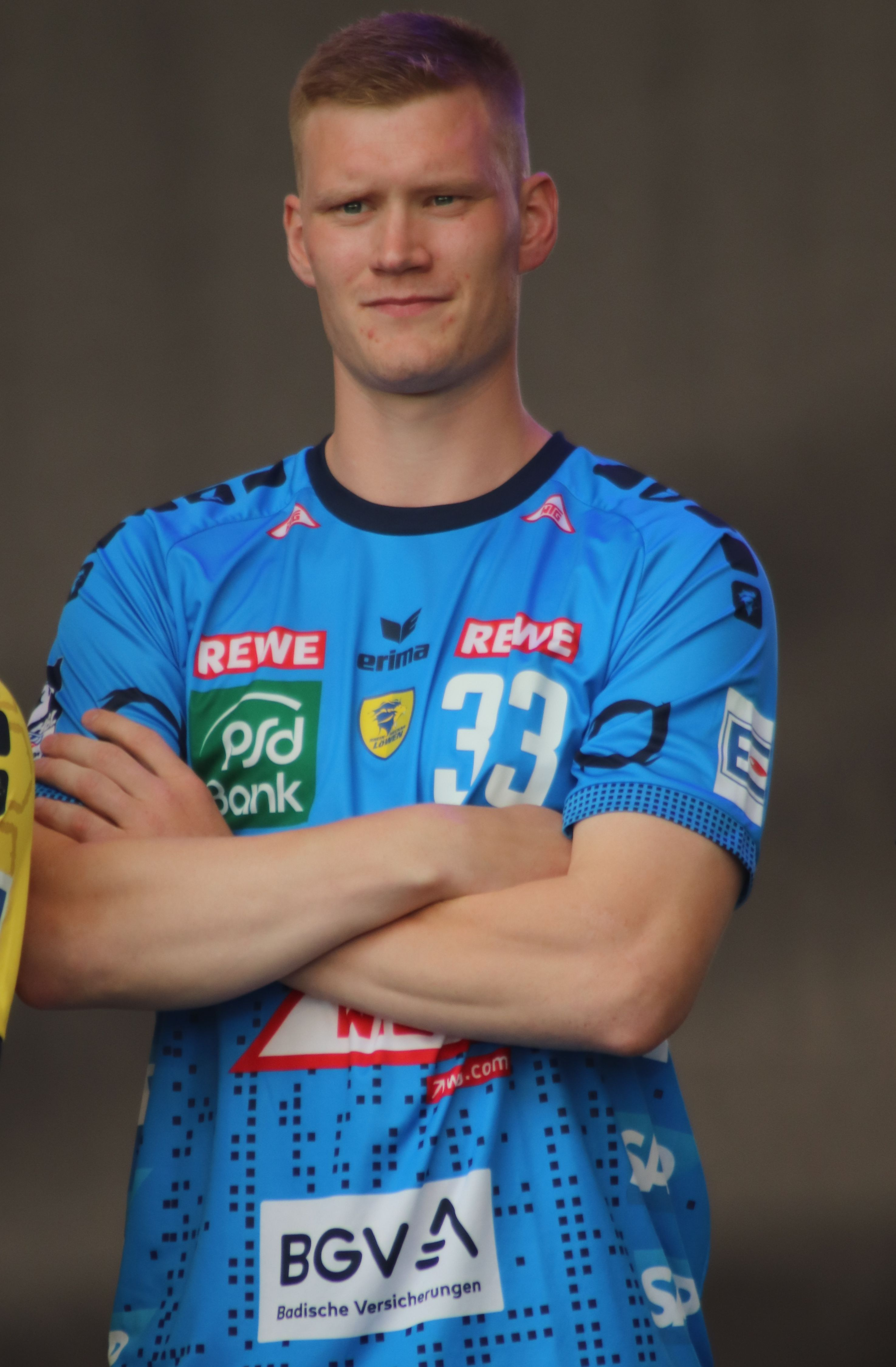

Personal information
- Nationality: Icelandic
- Born: 1 July 1997 (age 29) Reykjavík, Iceland
- Height: 1.92 m (6 ft 4 in)

Sport
- Sport: Handball
- Position: Pivot
- Current club: Frisch Auf Göppingen
- Number: 33

Senior clubs
- Years: Team
- 2016–2020: Valur
- 2020–2024: Rhein-Neckar Löwen
- 2024–: Frisch Auf Göppingen
National team
Years	Team	Apps	(Gls)
2017–	Iceland	76	(35)
- Updated on 4. November 2023

Ýmir Örn Gíslason (born 1 July 1997) is an Icelandic handball player for Frisch Auf Göppingen and the Icelandic national team.

He participated at the 2018 European Men's Handball Championship and the 2020 European Men's Handball Championship.

At the 2026 European Men's Handball Championship he finished 4th with Iceland, losing to Denmark in the semifinal and Croatia in the third-place playoff.
