= Jalesky Garcia Padron =

Icelandic/Cuban handball player (born 1975)

Jaliesky García
Personal information
- Full name: Jaliesky García Padron
- Nationality: Icelandic/Cuban
- Born: 28 January 1975 (age 51) Minas de Matahambre, Cuba
- Height: 194 cm (76 in)

Sport
- Sport: Handball
- Current club: Retired

Senior clubs
- Years: Team
- 1985–1991: EIDE Ormani Arenado Cuba
- 1985–1991: ESPA Nacional Cuba
- 2000–2003: HK Kópavogur Iceland
- 2003–2009: FRISCH AUF! Göppingen Germany
National team
Years	Team	Apps	(Gls)
1993–?	Cuba	11	(?)
2000–?	Iceland	46	(149)

Teams managed
- 2012–: Puerto Rico

Jalesky Garcia Padron (born 28 January 1975) is an Icelandic/Cuban handball player and coach who competed in the 2004 Summer Olympics.

Following his playing career, he was the manager of the Puerto Rico men's national handball team.
