= Anton Halén =

Swedish handball player (born 1990)

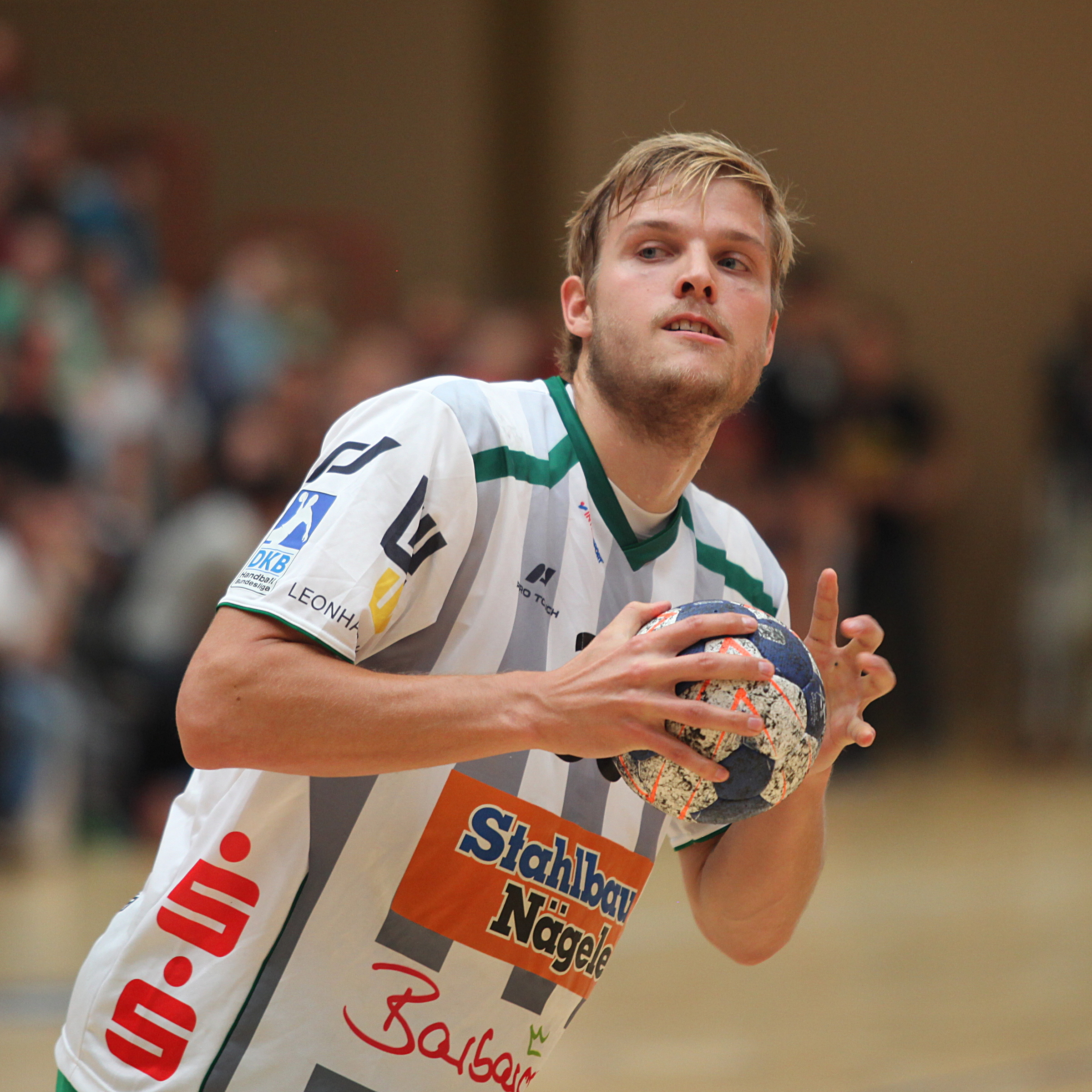
- Anton Halén playing for Frisch Auf Göppingen in August 2014

Personal information
- Nationality: Swedish
- Born: 28 November 1990 (age 35) Helgum, Sweden
- Height: 1.92 m (6 ft 4 in)

Sport
- Sport: Handball
- Position: Right wing
- Current club: IFK Kristianstad
- Number: 30

Senior clubs
- Years: Team
- 2006–2014: HK Drott
- 2014–2018: Frisch Auf Göppingen
- 2018–2024: IFK Kristianstad
National team
Years	Team	Apps	(Gls)
2013–2024	Sweden	25	(50)

Anton Halén (born 28 November 1990) is a Swedish former handball player who played for the Swedish national team. He retired in 2024 while playing for IFK Kristianstad.
