= Peter Jaschke =

German handball player (born 1952)

Peter Jaschke (born 1 March 1952) is a former West German handball player who competed in the 1976 Summer Olympics. Jaschke participated in two matches as a goalkeeper during the Olympic tournament. Following the conclusion of the games, he withdrew from the national team due to personal differences with the national coach, Vlado Stenzel.

In 1976 he was part of the West German team which finished fourth in the Olympic tournament. He played two matches as goalkeeper.
