= 2010–11 EHF Cup =

Tournament details
- Dates: 4 September 2010 - 22 May 2011
- Teams: 55 (from European Handball Federation confederations)

Final positions
- Champions: (Germany) Frisch Auf Göppingen
- Runners-up: (Germany) TV Großwallstadt

Tournament statistics
- Top scorer: (Germany) Dragoș Oprea (48 goals)

The 2010–11 EHF Cup season was the 30th edition of the tournament. Frisch Auf Göppingen won the Europe's club handball tournament. TBV Lemgo were the reigning champions. Frisch Auf Göppingen won the tournament.

== Knockout stage ==
=== Round 1 ===
Pot 1	Pot 2
(Luxembourg) Handball Esch (Georgia (country)) "GSAU-Tbilisi" Tbilisi (Cyprus) S.P.E. Strovolos (Kosovo) KH Kastrioti (Slovakia) MSK Hlohovec (Faroe Islands) Neistin (Belgium) United HC Tongeren	(Israel) Hapoel Rishon le Zion (Serbia) RK Metaloplastika Zorka K. (Italy) Teknoelektronica Teramo (Greece) A.C. Filippos Verias (Czech Republic) HC Dukla Praha (Luxembourg) HB Dudelange (Cyprus) A.C. "Latsia" K. Asfalistiki

Team 1	Agg.	Team 2	1st leg	2nd leg
MŠK Hlohovec (Slovakia)	45–50	(Czech Republic) HC Dukla Prague	22–18	22–32
United HC Tongeren (Belgium)		(Italy) Teknoelektronica Teramo	36–21	33–19
Metaloplastika Zorka Keramika (Serbia)	71–55	(Faroe Islands) Neistin	37–25	34–30
HB Dudelange (Luxembourg)	58–40	(Kosovo) KH Kastrioti	30–17	28–23
A.C. "Latsia" Kentriki Asfalistiki (Cyprus)		(Cyprus) SPE Strovolos Nicosia		
A.C. Filippos Verias (Greece)	55–61	(Luxembourg) Handball Esch	25–28	30–33
Hapoel Rishon LeZion (Israel)	92–56	(Georgia (country)) GSAU Tbilisi	50–32	42–24

=== Round of 16 ===
Team #1	Agg.	Team #2	1st match	2nd match
FC Porto (Portugal)	53–58	(Spain) Ademar León	26–25	27–33
Nordsjælland Håndbold (Denmark)	60–49	(Switzerland) GC Amicitia Zürich	33–26	27–23
Saint-Raphaël Var Handball (France)	70–51	(Russia) SKIF Krasnodar	38–29	32–22
Frisch Auf Göppingen (Germany)	48–41	(North Macedonia) HC Metalurg	27–21	21–20
RK Velenje (Slovenia)	61–41	(Austria) A1 Bregenz	32–15	29–26
Bjerringbro Silkeborg (Denmark)	49–51	(Germany) TV Grosswallstadt	22–22	27–29
TBV Lemgo (Germany)	55–53	(Turkey) Beşiktaş JK	27–25	28–28
Naturhouse La Rioja (Spain)	64–56	(Hungary) Tatabánya Carbonex KC	39–26	25–30

== Knockout stage ==
=== Quarterfinals ===
Team #1	Agg.	Team #2	1st match	2nd match
Saint Raphael Var Handball (France)	54–56	(Germany) TV Grosswallstadt	32–31	22–25
Frisch Auf Göppingen (Germany)	55–46	(Slovenia) RK Gorenje Velenje	33–20	22–26
Reale Ademar (Spain)	52–61	(Germany) TBV Lemgo	27–31	25–30
Nordsjælland Håndbold (Denmark)	60–63	(Spain) Naturhouse La Rioja	31–29	29–34

=== Semifinals ===
Team #1	Agg.	Team #2	1st match	2nd match
TBV Lemgo (Germany)	49–56	(Germany) TV Grosswallstadt	24–26	25–30
Frisch Auf Göppingen (Germany)	61–55	(Spain) Naturhouse La Rioja	32–23	29–32

=== Finals ===
Team 1	Agg.	Team 2	1st leg	2nd leg
Frisch Auf Göppingen (Germany)	53–47	(Germany) TV Grosswallstadt	23–21	30–26

EHF Cup 2010–11
Winner

Frisch Auf Göppingen
