= 2022–23 EHF European League knockout stage =

The 2022–23 EHF European League knockout stage began on 21 March with the Last 16 and ended on 28 May with the final at the Campushalle in Flensburg, Germany, to decide the winners of the 2022–23 EHF European League.

== Format ==
In the Last 16, the 16 teams ranked 1st–4th in the group stage play against each other in two-legged home-and-away matches. The eight winning teams advance to the quarterfinals, for another round of two-legged home-and-away matches. The four quarterfinal winners qualify for the final four tournament at the Campushalle (formerly Flens-Arena) in Flensburg, Germany.

== Pairings ==
The pairings for the last 16 and the quarterfinals are based on group stage standings, according to the following bracket. This assures teams from the same group can only play each other again in the final four.

Last 16
21 March/28 March
3D (Spain) Bidasoa Irun	30	28	58
2C (Portugal) Sporting CP	27	34	61
21 March/28 March
4B (Hungary) FTC	30	29	59
1A (France) Montpellier HB	36	43	79
21 March/28 March
3C (Spain) Fraikin BM Granollers	32	30	62
2D (Denmark) Skanderborg-Aarhus	34	25	59
21 March/28 March
4A (Portugal) SL Benfica	26	28	54
1B (Germany) SG Flensburg-Handewitt	39	33	72
21 March/28 March
3B (Iceland) Valur	29	31	60
2A (Germany) Frisch Auf Göppingen	36	33	69
21 March/28 March
4D (Ukraine) HC Motor	23	29	52
1C (Croatia) RK Nexe	27	27	54
21 March/28 March
3A (Switzerland) Kadetten Schaffhausen	38	27	65
2B (Sweden) Ystads IF	32	25	57
21 March/28 March
4C (Denmark) Skjern Håndbold	23	32	55
1D (Germany) Füchse Berlin	28	38	66

Quarterfinals
11 April/18 April
(Portugal) Sporting CP	32	30	62
(France) Montpellier HB	32	31	63
11 April/18 April
(Spain) Fraikin BM Granollers	30	35	65
(Germany) SG Flensburg-Handewitt	31	27	58
11 April/18 April
(Germany) Frisch Auf Göppingen	32	31	63
(Croatia) RK Nexe	23	27	50
11 April/18 April
(Switzerland) Kadetten Schaffhausen	37	24	61
(Germany) Füchse Berlin	33	30	63

== Last 16 ==
The last 16 first legs were played 21 March 2023, while the second legs followed on 28 March 2023.

Team 1	Agg.	Team 2	1st leg	2nd leg
Bidasoa Irun (Spain)	58–61	(Portugal) Sporting CP	30–27	28–34
FTC (Hungary)	59–79	(France) Montpellier HB	30–36	29–43
Fraikin BM Granollers (Spain)	62–59	(Denmark) Skanderborg-Aarhus	32–34	30–25
SL Benfica (Portugal)	54–72	(Germany) SG Flensburg-Handewitt	26–39	28–33
Valur (Iceland)	60–69	(Germany) Frisch Auf Göppingen	29–36	31–33
HC Motor (Ukraine)	52–54	(Croatia) RK Nexe	23–27	29–27
Kadetten Schaffhausen (Switzerland)	65–57	(Sweden) Ystads IF	38–32	27–25
Skjern Håndbold (Denmark)	55–66	(Germany) Füchse Berlin	23–28	32–38

21 March 2023; 20:45	Bidasoa Irun (Spain)	30–27	(Portugal) Sporting CP	Pabellón Polideportivo Artaleku, Irun; Attendance: 1,556; Referees: Brkic, Jusufhodzic (AUT)
21 March 2023; 20:45	Azkue Saizar 6	(11–12)	F. Costa 8	Pabellón Polideportivo Artaleku, Irun; Attendance: 1,556; Referees: Brkic, Jusufhodzic (AUT)
21 March 2023; 20:45	4× (suspension) 1× (red card)	Report	2× (yellow card) 5× (suspension)	Pabellón Polideportivo Artaleku, Irun; Attendance: 1,556; Referees: Brkic, Jusufhodzic (AUT)

28 March 2023; 20:45	Sporting CP (Portugal)	34–28	(Spain) Bidasoa Irun	Pavilhão João Rocha, Lisbon; Attendance: 1,784; Referees: Baumgart, Wild (GER)
28 March 2023; 20:45	M. Costa 10	(15–12)	Azkue Saizar 10	Pavilhão João Rocha, Lisbon; Attendance: 1,784; Referees: Baumgart, Wild (GER)
28 March 2023; 20:45	1× (yellow card) 4× (suspension)	Report	1× (yellow card) 4× (suspension)	Pavilhão João Rocha, Lisbon; Attendance: 1,784; Referees: Baumgart, Wild (GER)

21 March 2023; 20:45	FTC (Hungary)	30–36	(France) Montpellier HB	Riz Levente Sport- és Rendezvényközpont, Budapest; Attendance: 1,500; Referees: Jerlecki, Łabuń (POL)
21 March 2023; 20:45	Nagy 9	(17–16)	Simonet 7	Riz Levente Sport- és Rendezvényközpont, Budapest; Attendance: 1,500; Referees: Jerlecki, Łabuń (POL)
21 March 2023; 20:45	3× (suspension)	Report	3× (suspension)	Riz Levente Sport- és Rendezvényközpont, Budapest; Attendance: 1,500; Referees: Jerlecki, Łabuń (POL)

28 March 2023; 20:45	Montpellier HB (France)	43–29	(Hungary) FTC	FDI Stadium, Montpellier; Attendance: 2,700; Referees: Čerņavskis, Bogdanovs (LAT)
28 March 2023; 20:45	Bos 7	(23–11)	Balogh 7	FDI Stadium, Montpellier; Attendance: 2,700; Referees: Čerņavskis, Bogdanovs (LAT)
28 March 2023; 20:45	3× (suspension)	Report	3× (suspension)	FDI Stadium, Montpellier; Attendance: 2,700; Referees: Čerņavskis, Bogdanovs (LAT)

21 March 2023; 20:45	Fraikin BM Granollers (Spain)	32–34	(Denmark) Skanderborg-Aarhus	Palau d'Esports de Granollers, Granollers; Attendance: 1,500; Referees: Vešović, Mitrović (MNE)
21 March 2023; 20:45	Gurri Aregay, García Robledo 6	(12–20)	West Av Teigum 9	Palau d'Esports de Granollers, Granollers; Attendance: 1,500; Referees: Vešović, Mitrović (MNE)
21 March 2023; 20:45	1× (yellow card) 3× (suspension)	Report	2× (yellow card) 5× (suspension)	Palau d'Esports de Granollers, Granollers; Attendance: 1,500; Referees: Vešović, Mitrović (MNE)

28 March 2023; 18:45	Skanderborg-Aarhus (Denmark)	25–30	(Spain) Fraikin BM Granollers	Skanderborg Fælled, Skanderborg; Attendance: 1,600; Referees: Bolic, Hurich (AUT)
28 March 2023; 18:45	T. Arnoldsen, Petersen 6	(13–16)	Gurri Aregay 8	Skanderborg Fælled, Skanderborg; Attendance: 1,600; Referees: Bolic, Hurich (AUT)
28 March 2023; 18:45	3× (suspension)	Report	2× (yellow card) 3× (suspension)	Skanderborg Fælled, Skanderborg; Attendance: 1,600; Referees: Bolic, Hurich (AUT)

21 March 2023; 20:45	SL Benfica (Portugal)	26–39	(Germany) SG Flensburg-Handewitt	Pavilhão da Luz Nº 2, Lisbon; Attendance: 890; Referees: Sekulić, Jovandić (SRB)
21 March 2023; 20:45	Semedo 5	(10–21)	Jakobsen 9	Pavilhão da Luz Nº 2, Lisbon; Attendance: 890; Referees: Sekulić, Jovandić (SRB)
21 March 2023; 20:45	4× (suspension)	Report	1× (yellow card) 3× (suspension)	Pavilhão da Luz Nº 2, Lisbon; Attendance: 890; Referees: Sekulić, Jovandić (SRB)

28 March 2023; 18:45	SG Flensburg-Handewitt (Germany)	33–28	(Portugal) SL Benfica	Flens-Arena, Flensburg; Attendance: 3,364; Referees: Bíró, Kiss (HUN)
28 March 2023; 18:45	Johannessen 6	(19–16)	Grigoraș 5	Flens-Arena, Flensburg; Attendance: 3,364; Referees: Bíró, Kiss (HUN)
28 March 2023; 18:45	1× (suspension)	Report	1× (yellow card) 2× (suspension)	Flens-Arena, Flensburg; Attendance: 3,364; Referees: Bíró, Kiss (HUN)

21 March 2023; 20:45	Valur (Iceland)	29–36	(Germany) Frisch Auf Göppingen	Origo-höllin, Reykjavík; Attendance: 1,805; Referees: Erdoğan, Özdeniz (TUR)
21 March 2023; 20:45	Magnússon 8	(13–17)	Gulliksen 10	Origo-höllin, Reykjavík; Attendance: 1,805; Referees: Erdoğan, Özdeniz (TUR)
21 March 2023; 20:45	2× (suspension)	Report	1× (yellow card) 2× (suspension)	Origo-höllin, Reykjavík; Attendance: 1,805; Referees: Erdoğan, Özdeniz (TUR)

28 March 2023; 20:45	Frisch Auf Göppingen (Germany)	33–31	(Iceland) Valur	EWS Arena, Göppingen; Attendance: 3,400; Referees: Martins, Martins (POR)
28 March 2023; 20:45	Malus 6	(18–15)	Jónsson 11	EWS Arena, Göppingen; Attendance: 3,400; Referees: Martins, Martins (POR)
28 March 2023; 20:45	1× (yellow card) 2× (suspension)	Report	1× (yellow card) 2× (suspension)	EWS Arena, Göppingen; Attendance: 3,400; Referees: Martins, Martins (POR)

21 March 2023; 18:45	HC Motor (Ukraine)	23–27	(Croatia) RK Nexe	Castello Düsseldorf, Düsseldorf, Germany (Note: Due to the Russian invasion of Ukraine, HC Motor played its home match at neutral venue.); Attendance: 1,583; Referees: Mandák, Rudinský (SVK)
21 March 2023; 18:45	three players 5	(8–13)	Vejin 7	Castello Düsseldorf, Düsseldorf, Germany; Attendance: 1,583; Referees: Mandák, Rudinský (SVK)
21 March 2023; 18:45	1× (yellow card) 4× (suspension)	Report	2× (suspension)	Castello Düsseldorf, Düsseldorf, Germany; Attendance: 1,583; Referees: Mandák, Rudinský (SVK)

28 March 2023; 18:45	RK Nexe (Croatia)	27–29	(Ukraine) HC Motor	OS Kralja Tomislava, Našice; Attendance: 2,000; Referees: Madsen, Mortensen (DEN)
28 March 2023; 18:45	Severec 8	(9–16)	Turchenko 7	OS Kralja Tomislava, Našice; Attendance: 2,000; Referees: Madsen, Mortensen (DEN)
28 March 2023; 18:45	1× (yellow card) 2× (suspension)	Report	2× (yellow card) 4× (suspension)	OS Kralja Tomislava, Našice; Attendance: 2,000; Referees: Madsen, Mortensen (DEN)

21 March 2023; 20:45	Kadetten Schaffhausen (Switzerland)	38–32	(Sweden) Ystads IF	BBC-Arena, Schaffhausen; Attendance: 1,049; Referees: Santos, Fonseca (POR)
21 March 2023; 20:45	Ríkharðsson 14	(21–17)	Andersson 8	BBC-Arena, Schaffhausen; Attendance: 1,049; Referees: Santos, Fonseca (POR)
21 March 2023; 20:45	1× (yellow card) 6× (suspension)	Report	5× (suspension)	BBC-Arena, Schaffhausen; Attendance: 1,049; Referees: Santos, Fonseca (POR)

28 March 2023; 18:45	Ystads IF (Sweden)	25–27	(Switzerland) Kadetten Schaffhausen	Ystad Arena, Ystad; Attendance: 1,212; Referees: Gasmi, Gasmi (FRA)
28 March 2023; 18:45	Fernebrand, Kalstrup 5	(9–14)	Ríkharðsson 8	Ystad Arena, Ystad; Attendance: 1,212; Referees: Gasmi, Gasmi (FRA)
28 March 2023; 18:45	1× (yellow card) 1× (suspension)	Report	1× (yellow card) 3× (suspension)	Ystad Arena, Ystad; Attendance: 1,212; Referees: Gasmi, Gasmi (FRA)

21 March 2023; 18:45	Skjern Håndbold (Denmark)	23–28	(Germany) Füchse Berlin	Skjern Bank Arena, Skjern; Attendance: 3,264; Referees: Álvarez, Bustamante (ESP)
21 March 2023; 18:45	R. Rasmussen 5	(11–14)	Weber 9	Skjern Bank Arena, Skjern; Attendance: 3,264; Referees: Álvarez, Bustamante (ESP)
21 March 2023; 18:45	2× (yellow card) 2× (suspension)	Report	1× (yellow card) 2× (suspension)	Skjern Bank Arena, Skjern; Attendance: 3,264; Referees: Álvarez, Bustamante (ESP)

28 March 2023; 20:45	Füchse Berlin (Germany)	38–32	(Denmark) Skjern Håndbold	Max-Schmeling-Halle, Berlin; Attendance: 4,524; Referees: Covalciuc, Covalciuc (MDA)
28 March 2023; 20:45	Weber 8	(21–18)	Bergholt 11	Max-Schmeling-Halle, Berlin; Attendance: 4,524; Referees: Covalciuc, Covalciuc (MDA)
28 March 2023; 20:45	1× (yellow card) 5× (suspension)	Report	2× (yellow card) 4× (suspension)	Max-Schmeling-Halle, Berlin; Attendance: 4,524; Referees: Covalciuc, Covalciuc (MDA)

== Quarterfinals ==
The quarterfinals first legs were played 11 April 2023, while the second legs followed on 18 April 2023.

Team 1	Agg.	Team 2	1st leg	2nd leg
Sporting CP (Portugal)	62–63	(France) Montpellier HB	32–32	30–31
Fraikin BM Granollers (Spain)	65–58	(Germany) SG Flensburg-Handewitt	30–31	35–27
Frisch Auf Göppingen (Germany)	63–50	(Croatia) RK Nexe	32–23	31–27
Kadetten Schaffhausen (Switzerland)	61–63	(Germany) Füchse Berlin	37–33	24–30

11 April 2023; 20:45	Sporting CP (Portugal)	32–32	(France) Montpellier HB	Pavilhão João Rocha, Lisbon; Attendance: 1,931; Referees: Horváth, Marton (HUN)
11 April 2023; 20:45	F. Costa, M. Costa 7	(18–17)	Y. Lenne 7	Pavilhão João Rocha, Lisbon; Attendance: 1,931; Referees: Horváth, Marton (HUN)
11 April 2023; 20:45	2× (yellow card) 6× (suspension)	Report	1× (yellow card) 5× (suspension)	Pavilhão João Rocha, Lisbon; Attendance: 1,931; Referees: Horváth, Marton (HUN)

18 April 2023; 20:45	Montpellier HB (France)	31–30	(Portugal) Sporting CP	FDI Stadium, Montpellier; Attendance: 3,000; Referees: Boričić, Marković (SRB)
18 April 2023; 20:45	Bos 7	(16–14)	Salvador 8	FDI Stadium, Montpellier; Attendance: 3,000; Referees: Boričić, Marković (SRB)
18 April 2023; 20:45	1× (yellow card) 4× (suspension)	Report	2× (yellow card) 2× (suspension) 1× (red card)	FDI Stadium, Montpellier; Attendance: 3,000; Referees: Boričić, Marković (SRB)

11 April 2023; 18:45	Fraikin BM Granollers (Spain)	30–31	(Germany) SG Flensburg-Handewitt	Palau d'Esports de Granollers, Granollers; Attendance: 2,541; Referees: Lončar, Lončar (CRO)
11 April 2023; 18:45	García Robledo, Salinas 6	(14–17)	Jakobsen 9	Palau d'Esports de Granollers, Granollers; Attendance: 2,541; Referees: Lončar, Lončar (CRO)
11 April 2023; 18:45		Report	2× (yellow card) 2× (suspension)	Palau d'Esports de Granollers, Granollers; Attendance: 2,541; Referees: Lončar, Lončar (CRO)

18 April 2023; 20:45	SG Flensburg-Handewitt (Germany)	27–35	(Spain) Fraikin BM Granollers	Campushalle, Flensburg; Attendance: 2,718; Referees: Carmaux, Mursch (FRA)
18 April 2023; 20:45	Jakobsen 6	(12–16)	Faruk 10	Campushalle, Flensburg; Attendance: 2,718; Referees: Carmaux, Mursch (FRA)
18 April 2023; 20:45	2× (yellow card) 1× (suspension)	Report	3× (suspension)	Campushalle, Flensburg; Attendance: 2,718; Referees: Carmaux, Mursch (FRA)

11 April 2023; 20:45	Frisch Auf Göppingen (Germany)	32–23	(Croatia) RK Nexe	EWS Arena, Göppingen; Attendance: 4,200; Referees: Andorka, Hucker (HUN)
11 April 2023; 20:45	Gulliksen, Schiller 7	(15–9)	Kević 7	EWS Arena, Göppingen; Attendance: 4,200; Referees: Andorka, Hucker (HUN)
11 April 2023; 20:45	1× (yellow card) 4× (suspension)	Report	2× (yellow card) 3× (suspension)	EWS Arena, Göppingen; Attendance: 4,200; Referees: Andorka, Hucker (HUN)

18 April 2023; 18:45	RK Nexe (Croatia)	27–31	(Germany) Frisch Auf Göppingen	OS Kralja Tomislava, Našice; Attendance: 2,000; Referees: Caçador, Nicolau (POR)
18 April 2023; 18:45	Kević 8	(12–13)	Šarac 6	OS Kralja Tomislava, Našice; Attendance: 2,000; Referees: Caçador, Nicolau (POR)
18 April 2023; 18:45	3× (suspension)	Report	4× (suspension)	OS Kralja Tomislava, Našice; Attendance: 2,000; Referees: Caçador, Nicolau (POR)

11 April 2023; 18:45	Kadetten Schaffhausen (Switzerland)	37–33	(Germany) Füchse Berlin	BBC-Arena, Schaffhausen; Attendance: 3,500; Referees: Mitrevski, Todorovski (MKD)
11 April 2023; 18:45	Ríkharðsson 15	(19–18)	Andersson 7	BBC-Arena, Schaffhausen; Attendance: 3,500; Referees: Mitrevski, Todorovski (MKD)
11 April 2023; 18:45	1× (yellow card) 5× (suspension)	Report	1× (yellow card) 6× (suspension)	BBC-Arena, Schaffhausen; Attendance: 3,500; Referees: Mitrevski, Todorovski (MKD)

18 April 2023; 18:45	Füchse Berlin (Germany)	30–24	(Switzerland) Kadetten Schaffhausen	Max-Schmeling-Halle, Berlin; Attendance: 7,911; Referees: Stark, Ştefan (ROU)
18 April 2023; 18:45	Gidsel 10	(17–15)	Ríkharðsson 6	Max-Schmeling-Halle, Berlin; Attendance: 7,911; Referees: Stark, Ştefan (ROU)
18 April 2023; 18:45	1× (yellow card) 1× (suspension) 1× (red card)	Report	5× (suspension)	Max-Schmeling-Halle, Berlin; Attendance: 7,911; Referees: Stark, Ştefan (ROU)

== Final four ==
The final four was held at the Campushalle in Flensburg, Germany on 27 and 28 May 2023. The draw for the semifinals was held on 20 April 2023.

=== Bracket ===
Semifinals
27 May
(France) Montpellier HB	29
(Germany) Füchse Berlin	35
27 May
(Spain) Fraikin BM Granollers	31
(Germany) Frisch Auf Göppingen	29

Final
28 May
(Germany) Füchse Berlin	36
(Spain) Fraikin BM Granollers	31
Third place
28 May
(France) Montpellier HB	29
(Germany) Frisch Auf Göppingen	33

=== Semifinals ===
27 May 2023; 15:30	Montpellier HB (France)	29–35	(Germany) Füchse Berlin	Campushalle, Flensburg; Attendance: 5,500; Referees: Martins, Martins (POR)
27 May 2023; 15:30	Bos, Y. Lenne 6	(16–16)	Lindberg 8	Campushalle, Flensburg; Attendance: 5,500; Referees: Martins, Martins (POR)
27 May 2023; 15:30	7× (suspension)	Report	3× (suspension)	Campushalle, Flensburg; Attendance: 5,500; Referees: Martins, Martins (POR)

27 May 2023; 18:00	Fraikin BM Granollers (Spain)	31–29	(Germany) Frisch Auf Göppingen	Campushalle, Flensburg; Attendance: 4,200; Referees: Konjičanin, Konjičanin (BIH)
27 May 2023; 18:00	Gurri Aregay 9	(16–18)	Kozina, Šarac 5	Campushalle, Flensburg; Attendance: 4,200; Referees: Konjičanin, Konjičanin (BIH)
27 May 2023; 18:00	1× (yellow card) 4× (suspension)	Report	1× (yellow card) 4× (suspension)	Campushalle, Flensburg; Attendance: 4,200; Referees: Konjičanin, Konjičanin (BIH)

=== Third place game ===
28 May 2023; 15:30	Montpellier HB (France)	29–33	(Germany) Frisch Auf Göppingen	Campushalle, Flensburg; Attendance: 4,300; Referees: Bolic, Hurich (AUT)
28 May 2023; 15:30	Bos 7	(17–16)	Schiller 6	Campushalle, Flensburg; Attendance: 4,300; Referees: Bolic, Hurich (AUT)
28 May 2023; 15:30	4× (suspension)	Report	4× (suspension) 1× (red card)	Campushalle, Flensburg; Attendance: 4,300; Referees: Bolic, Hurich (AUT)

=== Final ===
28 May 2023; 18:00	Füchse Berlin (Germany)	36–31	(Spain) Fraikin BM Granollers	Campushalle, Flensburg; Attendance: 4,300; Referees: Madsen, Mortensen (DEN)
28 May 2023; 18:00	Andersson 8	(16–12)	García Robledo, Salinas 7	Campushalle, Flensburg; Attendance: 4,300; Referees: Madsen, Mortensen (DEN)
28 May 2023; 18:00	2× (yellow card) 2× (suspension)	Report	2× (yellow card) 4× (suspension)	Campushalle, Flensburg; Attendance: 4,300; Referees: Madsen, Mortensen (DEN)
