= 2022–23 EHF European League group stage =

The 2022–23 EHF European League group stage was played between 25 October 2022 and 28 February 2023 to determine the twelve teams advancing to the knockout stage of the 2022–23 EHF European League.

== Draw ==
The draw was held on 6 October 2022 in Vienna, Austria.

=== Seeding ===
The 24 teams were divided into six pots of four teams, with a team from each pot being drawn to each group. Teams from the same country could not be drawn into the same group. The draw was held in EHF office in Vienna.

Pot 1	Pot 2	Pot 3	Pot 4	Pot 5	Pot 6
(Denmark) Skjern Håndbold (France) PAUC Handball (Germany) Füchse Berlin (Portugal) SL Benfica	(Spain) Fraikin BM Granollers (North Macedonia) Eurofarm Pelister (Switzerland) Kadetten Schaffhausen (Sweden) Ystads IF	(Hungary) Balatonfüredi KSE (Iceland) Valur (Slovakia) Tatran Prešov (Ukraine) HC Motor	(Spain) Bidasoa Irun (Germany) SG Flensburg-Handewitt (Germany) Frisch Auf Göppingen (Portugal) Sporting CP	(Croatia) RK Nexe (Denmark) Skanderborg-Aarhus (Spain) BM Benidorm (France) Montpellier HB	(Austria) Alpla HC Hard (Hungary) Fejér B.Á.L. Veszprém (Hungary) FTC (Portugal) Águas Santas Milaneza

== Format ==
In each group, teams played against each other in a double round-robin format, with home and away matches.

== Tiebreakers ==
In the group stage, teams were ranked according to points (2 points for a win, 1 point for a draw, 0 points for a loss), and if tied on points, the following tiebreaking criteria were applied, in the order given, to determine the rankings:

1. Points in matches among tied teams;
2. Goal difference in matches among tied teams;
3. Goal difference in all group matches;
4. Goals scored in all group matches;
5. If more than two teams were tied, and after applying all head-to-head criteria above, a subset of teams were still tied, all head-to-head criteria above were reapplied exclusively to this subset of teams;
6. Drawing lots.

== Groups ==
The matchdays were 25 October, 1 November, 22 November, 29 November, 6 December, 13 December 2022, 7 February, 14 February, 21 February, and 28 February 2023.

Times until 29 October 2022 were UTC+2, from 30 October 2022 on UTC+1.

=== Group A ===
Pos	Team	Pld	W	D	L	GF	GA	GD	Pts	Qualification
1	(France) Montpellier HB	10	8	0	2	330	295	+35	16 (Note: Montpellier 60–54 Göppingen)	Knockout stage
2	(Germany) Frisch Auf Göppingen	10	8	0	2	323	274	+49	16	Knockout stage
3	(Switzerland) Kadetten Schaffhausen	10	7	0	3	319	299	+20	14	Knockout stage
4	(Portugal) SL Benfica	10	4	0	6	297	289	+8	8	Knockout stage
5	(Slovakia) Tatran Prešov	10	2	0	8	279	319	−40	4	
6	(Hungary) Fejér B.Á.L. Veszprém	10	1	0	9	282	354	−72	2	

Source: EHF
Rules for classification: Tiebreakers
Notes:

25 October 2022; 18:45	Frisch Auf Göppingen (Germany)	46–30	(Hungary) Fejér B.Á.L. Veszprém	EWS Arena, Göppingen; Attendance: 1,500; Referees: Brkic, Jusufhodzic (AUT)
25 October 2022; 18:45	Kozina 8	(23–18)	Éles 9	EWS Arena, Göppingen; Attendance: 1,500; Referees: Brkic, Jusufhodzic (AUT)
25 October 2022; 18:45	1× (yellow card) 5× (suspension)	Report	1× (yellow card) 2× (suspension)	EWS Arena, Göppingen; Attendance: 1,500; Referees: Brkic, Jusufhodzic (AUT)

25 October 2022; 20:45	Kadetten Schaffhausen (Switzerland)	28–30	(France) Montpellier HB	BBC-Arena, Schaffhausen; Attendance: 1,082; Referees: Bíró, Kiss (HUN)
25 October 2022; 20:45	Cañellas 8	(16–18)	Porte 7	BBC-Arena, Schaffhausen; Attendance: 1,082; Referees: Bíró, Kiss (HUN)
25 October 2022; 20:45	3× (suspension)	Report	3× (suspension)	BBC-Arena, Schaffhausen; Attendance: 1,082; Referees: Bíró, Kiss (HUN)

25 October 2022; 20:45	Tatran Prešov (Slovakia)	25–29	(Portugal) SL Benfica	Tatran Handball Arena, Prešov; Attendance: 1,000; Referees: Vitaku, Vitaku (KOS)
25 October 2022; 20:45	Urban 6	(9–15)	Đorđić 10	Tatran Handball Arena, Prešov; Attendance: 1,000; Referees: Vitaku, Vitaku (KOS)
25 October 2022; 20:45	1× (yellow card) 2× (suspension)	Report	1× (yellow card) 2× (suspension)	Tatran Handball Arena, Prešov; Attendance: 1,000; Referees: Vitaku, Vitaku (KOS)

1 November 2022; 17:00	Fejér B.Á.L. Veszprém (Hungary)	25–33	(Switzerland) Kadetten Schaffhausen	Veszprém Aréna, Veszprém; Attendance: 1,000; Referees: Jović, Arnautović (BIH)
1 November 2022; 17:00	Éles 6	(11–16)	Ríkharðsson 10	Veszprém Aréna, Veszprém; Attendance: 1,000; Referees: Jović, Arnautović (BIH)
1 November 2022; 17:00	5× (suspension) 1× (red card)	Report	2× (suspension)	Veszprém Aréna, Veszprém; Attendance: 1,000; Referees: Jović, Arnautović (BIH)

1 November 2022; 18:45	SL Benfica (Portugal)	27–31	(Germany) Frisch Auf Göppingen	Pavilhão da Luz Nº 2, Lisbon; Attendance: 751; Referees: Mazeika, Gatelis (LTU)
1 November 2022; 18:45	Rahmel 5	(11–16)	Schiller 9	Pavilhão da Luz Nº 2, Lisbon; Attendance: 751; Referees: Mazeika, Gatelis (LTU)
1 November 2022; 18:45	1× (yellow card) 4× (suspension)	Report	1× (yellow card) 6× (suspension)	Pavilhão da Luz Nº 2, Lisbon; Attendance: 751; Referees: Mazeika, Gatelis (LTU)

1 November 2022; 20:45	Montpellier HB (France)	41–30	(Slovakia) Tatran Prešov	FDI Stadium, Montpellier; Attendance: 2,700; Referees: Bethmann, Tzaferopoulos (GRE)
1 November 2022; 20:45	Simonet 7	(20–14)	Hernández 7	FDI Stadium, Montpellier; Attendance: 2,700; Referees: Bethmann, Tzaferopoulos (GRE)
1 November 2022; 20:45	2× (yellow card) 5× (suspension)	Report	2× (yellow card) 1× (suspension)	FDI Stadium, Montpellier; Attendance: 2,700; Referees: Bethmann, Tzaferopoulos (GRE)

22 November 2022; 20:45	Montpellier HB (France)	35–27	(Germany) Frisch Auf Göppingen	FDI Stadium, Montpellier; Attendance: 2,300; Referees: Pirvu, Potirniche (ROU)
22 November 2022; 20:45	Porte 7	(20–13)	Goller 6	FDI Stadium, Montpellier; Attendance: 2,300; Referees: Pirvu, Potirniche (ROU)
22 November 2022; 20:45	3× (suspension)	Report	3× (suspension)	FDI Stadium, Montpellier; Attendance: 2,300; Referees: Pirvu, Potirniche (ROU)

22 November 2022; 20:45	Tatran Prešov (Slovakia)	31–37	(Switzerland) Kadetten Schaffhausen	Tatran Handball Arena, Prešov; Attendance: 580; Referees: Čerņavskis, Bogdanovs (LAT)
22 November 2022; 20:45	Rábek 8	(14–18)	Rikhardsson 9	Tatran Handball Arena, Prešov; Attendance: 580; Referees: Čerņavskis, Bogdanovs (LAT)
22 November 2022; 20:45	1× (yellow card) 1× (suspension)	Report	5× (suspension)	Tatran Handball Arena, Prešov; Attendance: 580; Referees: Čerņavskis, Bogdanovs (LAT)

22 November 2022; 20:45	SL Benfica (Portugal)	39–35	(Hungary) Fejér B.Á.L. Veszprém	Pavilhão da Luz Nº 2, Lisbon; Attendance: 410; Referees: Petursson, Thrastarson (ISL)
22 November 2022; 20:45	Grigoras, Djordjic 7	(21–17)	Éles 8	Pavilhão da Luz Nº 2, Lisbon; Attendance: 410; Referees: Petursson, Thrastarson (ISL)
22 November 2022; 20:45	1× (yellow card) 2× (suspension)	Report	1× (yellow card) 5× (suspension)	Pavilhão da Luz Nº 2, Lisbon; Attendance: 410; Referees: Petursson, Thrastarson (ISL)

29 November 2022; 18:45	Kadetten Schaffhausen (Switzerland)	26–25	(Portugal) SL Benfica	BBC-Arena, Schaffhausen; Attendance: 1,243; Referees: Mitrevski, Todorovski (MKD)
29 November 2022; 18:45	Cañellas 6	(13–12)	Đorđić 5	BBC-Arena, Schaffhausen; Attendance: 1,243; Referees: Mitrevski, Todorovski (MKD)
29 November 2022; 18:45	4× (suspension)	Report	2× (yellow card) 3× (suspension)	BBC-Arena, Schaffhausen; Attendance: 1,243; Referees: Mitrevski, Todorovski (MKD)

29 November 2022; 18:45	Fejér B.Á.L. Veszprém (Hungary)	31–39	(France) Montpellier HB	Veszprém Aréna, Veszprém; Attendance: 1,100; Referees: Vitaku, Vitaku (KOS)
29 November 2022; 18:45	Stranigg 6	(16–25)	Y. Lenne 8	Veszprém Aréna, Veszprém; Attendance: 1,100; Referees: Vitaku, Vitaku (KOS)
29 November 2022; 18:45	1× (yellow card) 1× (suspension)	Report	1× (yellow card) 2× (suspension)	Veszprém Aréna, Veszprém; Attendance: 1,100; Referees: Vitaku, Vitaku (KOS)

29 November 2022; 18:45	Frisch Auf Göppingen (Germany)	34–24	(Slovakia) Tatran Prešov	EWS Arena, Göppingen; Attendance: 2,300; Referees: Nygaard, Pedersen (DEN)
29 November 2022; 18:45	Gulliksen 6	(19–8)	Ivanović 11	EWS Arena, Göppingen; Attendance: 2,300; Referees: Nygaard, Pedersen (DEN)
29 November 2022; 18:45	1× (yellow card) 2× (suspension)	Report	1× (yellow card) 1× (suspension)	EWS Arena, Göppingen; Attendance: 2,300; Referees: Nygaard, Pedersen (DEN)

6 December 2022; 17:00	Fejér B.Á.L. Veszprém (Hungary)	30–28	(Slovakia) Tatran Prešov	Veszprém Aréna, Veszprém; Attendance: 600; Referees: Covalciuc, Covalciuc (MDA)
6 December 2022; 17:00	Éles 9	(13–16)	Rábek 8	Veszprém Aréna, Veszprém; Attendance: 600; Referees: Covalciuc, Covalciuc (MDA)
6 December 2022; 17:00	4× (suspension)	Report	2× (suspension)	Veszprém Aréna, Veszprém; Attendance: 600; Referees: Covalciuc, Covalciuc (MDA)

6 December 2022; 20:45	SL Benfica (Portugal)	24–26	(France) Montpellier HB	Pavilhão da Luz Nº 2, Lisbon; Attendance: 276; Referees: Brkic, Jusufhodzic (AUT)
6 December 2022; 20:45	Rahmel 6	(12–12)	Pellas 6	Pavilhão da Luz Nº 2, Lisbon; Attendance: 276; Referees: Brkic, Jusufhodzic (AUT)
6 December 2022; 20:45	7× (suspension)	Report	1× (yellow card) 6× (suspension)	Pavilhão da Luz Nº 2, Lisbon; Attendance: 276; Referees: Brkic, Jusufhodzic (AUT)

6 December 2022; 20:45	Frisch Auf Göppingen (Germany)	24–25	(Switzerland) Kadetten Schaffhausen	EWS Arena, Göppingen; Attendance: 2,000; Referees: Álvarez, Bustamante (ESP)
6 December 2022; 20:45	three players 5	(14–10)	Cañellas 6	EWS Arena, Göppingen; Attendance: 2,000; Referees: Álvarez, Bustamante (ESP)
6 December 2022; 20:45	4× (suspension)	Report	2× (suspension)	EWS Arena, Göppingen; Attendance: 2,000; Referees: Álvarez, Bustamante (ESP)

13 December 2022; 18:45	Tatran Prešov (Slovakia)	22–20	(Hungary) Fejér B.Á.L. Veszprém	Tatran Handball Arena, Prešov; Attendance: 301; Referees: Mošorinski, Pandžić (SRB)
13 December 2022; 18:45	Rábek 8	(12–11)	Stranigg 5	Tatran Handball Arena, Prešov; Attendance: 301; Referees: Mošorinski, Pandžić (SRB)
13 December 2022; 18:45	1× (yellow card) 2× (suspension)	Report	2× (yellow card) 3× (suspension)	Tatran Handball Arena, Prešov; Attendance: 301; Referees: Mošorinski, Pandžić (SRB)

13 December 2022; 18:45	Kadetten Schaffhausen (Switzerland)	30–35	(Germany) Frisch Auf Göppingen	BBC-Arena, Schaffhausen; Attendance: 2,124; Referees: Elíasson, Pálsson (ISL)
13 December 2022; 18:45	Bartók 8	(17–17)	Andersen 9	BBC-Arena, Schaffhausen; Attendance: 2,124; Referees: Elíasson, Pálsson (ISL)
13 December 2022; 18:45	1× (yellow card) 5× (suspension)	Report	1× (yellow card) 4× (suspension)	BBC-Arena, Schaffhausen; Attendance: 2,124; Referees: Elíasson, Pálsson (ISL)

13 December 2022; 20:45	Montpellier HB (France)	33–27	(Portugal) SL Benfica	FDI Stadium, Montpellier; Attendance: 2,200; Referees: Pavićević, Ražnatović (MNE)
13 December 2022; 20:45	Villeminot 10	(16–12)	Borges 8	FDI Stadium, Montpellier; Attendance: 2,200; Referees: Pavićević, Ražnatović (MNE)
13 December 2022; 20:45	4× (suspension)	Report	7× (suspension) 1× (red card)	FDI Stadium, Montpellier; Attendance: 2,200; Referees: Pavićević, Ražnatović (MNE)

7 February 2023; 17:00	Fejér B.Á.L. Veszprém (Hungary)	23–40	(Germany) Frisch Auf Göppingen	Veszprém Aréna, Veszprém; Attendance: 1,000; Referees: Vešović, Mitrović (MNE)
7 February 2023; 17:00	Éles 7	(11–20)	four players 5	Veszprém Aréna, Veszprém; Attendance: 1,000; Referees: Vešović, Mitrović (MNE)
7 February 2023; 17:00	1× (yellow card) 3× (suspension)	Report	1× (yellow card) 2× (suspension)	Veszprém Aréna, Veszprém; Attendance: 1,000; Referees: Vešović, Mitrović (MNE)

7 February 2023; 18:45	SL Benfica (Portugal)	35–28	(Slovakia) Tatran Prešov	Pavilhão da Luz Nº 2, Lisbon; Attendance: 428; Referees: Jerlecki, Łabuń (POL)
7 February 2023; 18:45	Izquierdo 7	(21–11)	Ivanović 10	Pavilhão da Luz Nº 2, Lisbon; Attendance: 428; Referees: Jerlecki, Łabuń (POL)
7 February 2023; 18:45	6× (suspension)	Report	5× (suspension)	Pavilhão da Luz Nº 2, Lisbon; Attendance: 428; Referees: Jerlecki, Łabuń (POL)

7 February 2023; 20:45	Montpellier HB (France)	40–36	(Switzerland) Kadetten Schaffhausen	FDI Stadium, Montpellier; Attendance: 2,800; Referees: Madsen, Mortensen (DEN)
7 February 2023; 20:45	Villeminot 10	(22–18)	Ríkharðsson 8	FDI Stadium, Montpellier; Attendance: 2,800; Referees: Madsen, Mortensen (DEN)
7 February 2023; 20:45	2× (yellow card) 2× (suspension)	Report	1× (yellow card) 3× (suspension)	FDI Stadium, Montpellier; Attendance: 2,800; Referees: Madsen, Mortensen (DEN)

14 February 2023; 18:45	Tatran Prešov (Slovakia)	35–27	(France) Montpellier HB	Tatran Handball Arena, Prešov; Attendance: 1,647; Referees: Ivanović, Vujisić (MNE)
14 February 2023; 18:45	Rábek 10	(19–10)	Bos 8	Tatran Handball Arena, Prešov; Attendance: 1,647; Referees: Ivanović, Vujisić (MNE)
14 February 2023; 18:45	1× (yellow card) 3× (suspension)	Report	1× (yellow card) 6× (suspension) 1× (red card)	Tatran Handball Arena, Prešov; Attendance: 1,647; Referees: Ivanović, Vujisić (MNE)

14 February 2023; 18:45	Frisch Auf Göppingen (Germany)	31–29	(Portugal) SL Benfica	EWS Arena, Göppingen; Attendance: 3,700; Referees: Bolic, Hurich (AUT)
14 February 2023; 18:45	Schiller 8	(15–18)	Đorđić 7	EWS Arena, Göppingen; Attendance: 3,700; Referees: Bolic, Hurich (AUT)
14 February 2023; 18:45	1× (suspension)	Report	1× (yellow card) 9× (suspension)	EWS Arena, Göppingen; Attendance: 3,700; Referees: Bolic, Hurich (AUT)

14 February 2023; 20:45	Kadetten Schaffhausen (Switzerland)	38–32	(Hungary) Fejér B.Á.L. Veszprém	BBC-Arena, Schaffhausen; Attendance: 712; Referees: Andreou, Panayides (CYP)
14 February 2023; 20:45	Ríkharðsson 10	(22–17)	Éles 8	BBC-Arena, Schaffhausen; Attendance: 712; Referees: Andreou, Panayides (CYP)
14 February 2023; 20:45	2× (yellow card) 2× (suspension)	Report	1× (yellow card) 2× (suspension)	BBC-Arena, Schaffhausen; Attendance: 712; Referees: Andreou, Panayides (CYP)

21 February 2023; 18:45	Tatran Prešov (Slovakia)	26–28	(Germany) Frisch Auf Göppingen	Tatran Handball Arena, Prešov; Attendance: 874; Referees: Covalciuc, Covalciuc (MDA)
21 February 2023; 18:45	Rábek 10	(10–13)	Šarac 5	Tatran Handball Arena, Prešov; Attendance: 874; Referees: Covalciuc, Covalciuc (MDA)
21 February 2023; 18:45	2× (suspension)	Report	4× (suspension)	Tatran Handball Arena, Prešov; Attendance: 874; Referees: Covalciuc, Covalciuc (MDA)

21 February 2023; 18:45	SL Benfica (Portugal)	27–28	(Switzerland) Kadetten Schaffhausen	Pavilhão da Luz Nº 2, Lisbon; Attendance: 700; Referees: Lončar, Lončar (CRO)
21 February 2023; 18:45	Grigoraș, Rahmel 8	(13–13)	Ríkharðsson 8	Pavilhão da Luz Nº 2, Lisbon; Attendance: 700; Referees: Lončar, Lončar (CRO)
21 February 2023; 18:45	1× (yellow card) 4× (suspension) 1× (red card)	Report	1× (yellow card) 5× (suspension)	Pavilhão da Luz Nº 2, Lisbon; Attendance: 700; Referees: Lončar, Lončar (CRO)

21 February 2023; 20:45	Montpellier HB (France)	34–30	(Hungary) Fejér B.Á.L. Veszprém	FDI Stadium, Montpellier; Attendance: 3,000; Referees: Weijmans, Wolbertus (NED)
21 February 2023; 20:45	Pellas 11	(19–16)	Éles 8	FDI Stadium, Montpellier; Attendance: 3,000; Referees: Weijmans, Wolbertus (NED)
21 February 2023; 20:45	1× (yellow card) 2× (suspension)	Report	3× (suspension)	FDI Stadium, Montpellier; Attendance: 3,000; Referees: Weijmans, Wolbertus (NED)

28 February 2023; 17:00	Fejér B.Á.L. Veszprém (Hungary)	26–35	(Portugal) SL Benfica	Veszprém Aréna, Veszprém; Attendance: 600; Referees: Boričić, Marković (SRB)
28 February 2023; 17:00	Stranigg 7	(14–17)	Đorđić 7	Veszprém Aréna, Veszprém; Attendance: 600; Referees: Boričić, Marković (SRB)
28 February 2023; 17:00	1× (yellow card) 4× (suspension)	Report	5× (suspension)	Veszprém Aréna, Veszprém; Attendance: 600; Referees: Boričić, Marković (SRB)

28 February 2023; 18:45	Frisch Auf Göppingen (Germany)	27–25	(France) Montpellier HB	EWS Arena, Göppingen; Attendance: 4,000; Referees: Mitrevski, Todorovski (MKD)
28 February 2023; 18:45	Schiller 7	(14–11)	Descat, Simonet 6	EWS Arena, Göppingen; Attendance: 4,000; Referees: Mitrevski, Todorovski (MKD)
28 February 2023; 18:45	2× (yellow card) 3× (suspension)	Report	2× (yellow card) 6× (suspension)	EWS Arena, Göppingen; Attendance: 4,000; Referees: Mitrevski, Todorovski (MKD)

28 February 2023; 18:45	Kadetten Schaffhausen (Switzerland)	38–30	(Slovakia) Tatran Prešov	BBC-Arena, Schaffhausen; Attendance: 913; Referees: Kull, Tint (EST)
28 February 2023; 18:45	Ríkharðsson 13	(20–15)	Rábek 7	BBC-Arena, Schaffhausen; Attendance: 913; Referees: Kull, Tint (EST)
28 February 2023; 18:45	7× (suspension)	Report	3× (suspension)	BBC-Arena, Schaffhausen; Attendance: 913; Referees: Kull, Tint (EST)

=== Group B ===
Pos	Team	Pld	W	D	L	GF	GA	GD	Pts	Qualification
1	(Germany) SG Flensburg-Handewitt	10	8	1	1	327	280	+47	17	Knockout stage
2	(Sweden) Ystads IF	10	5	1	4	317	316	+1	11 (Note: Ystad 65–64 Valur)	Knockout stage
3	(Iceland) Valur	10	5	1	4	338	328	+10	11	Knockout stage
4	(Hungary) FTC	10	3	3	4	318	328	−10	9	Knockout stage
5	(France) PAUC Handball	10	4	0	6	305	313	−8	8	
6	(Spain) BM Benidorm	10	2	0	8	295	335	−40	4	

Source: EHF
Rules for classification: Tiebreakers
Notes:

25 October 2022; 18:45	Ystads IF (Sweden)	29–33	(France) PAUC Handball	Ystad Arena, Ystad; Attendance: 1,012; Referees: Horváth, Marton (HUN)
25 October 2022; 18:45	Månsson, Svensson 6	(14–17)	Ong, Tarrafeta 6	Ystad Arena, Ystad; Attendance: 1,012; Referees: Horváth, Marton (HUN)
25 October 2022; 18:45	5× (yellow card) 1× (suspension)	Report	2× (yellow card) 1× (suspension)	Ystad Arena, Ystad; Attendance: 1,012; Referees: Horváth, Marton (HUN)

25 October 2022; 20:45	Valur (Iceland)	43–39	(Hungary) FTC	Origo-höllin, Reykjavík; Attendance: 785; Referees: Gasmi, Gasmi (FRA)
25 October 2022; 20:45	Svölu Baldursson 8	(22–15)	Lékai 9	Origo-höllin, Reykjavík; Attendance: 785; Referees: Gasmi, Gasmi (FRA)
25 October 2022; 20:45	1× (yellow card) 5× (suspension)	Report	4× (suspension)	Origo-höllin, Reykjavík; Attendance: 785; Referees: Gasmi, Gasmi (FRA)

25 October 2022; 20:45	SG Flensburg-Handewitt (Germany)	35–30	(Spain) BM Benidorm	Flens-Arena, Flensburg; Attendance: 1,329; Referees: Mandák, Rudinský (SVK)
25 October 2022; 20:45	Johannessen 7	(16–19)	Bernatonis, Rodríguez 6	Flens-Arena, Flensburg; Attendance: 1,329; Referees: Mandák, Rudinský (SVK)
25 October 2022; 20:45	4× (suspension) 1× (red card)	Report	6× (suspension)	Flens-Arena, Flensburg; Attendance: 1,329; Referees: Mandák, Rudinský (SVK)

1 November 2022; 18:45	SG Flensburg-Handewitt (Germany)	30–25	(France) PAUC Handball	Flens-Arena, Flensburg; Attendance: 1,364; Referees: Mošorinski, Pandžić (SRB)
1 November 2022; 18:45	Jakobsen 11	(15–12)	Kristjánsson 6	Flens-Arena, Flensburg; Attendance: 1,364; Referees: Mošorinski, Pandžić (SRB)
1 November 2022; 18:45	2× (yellow card) 3× (suspension)	Report	2× (yellow card) 1× (suspension)	Flens-Arena, Flensburg; Attendance: 1,364; Referees: Mošorinski, Pandžić (SRB)

1 November 2022; 18:45	FTC (Hungary)	37–34	(Sweden) Ystads IF	Riz Levente Sport- és Rendezvényközpont, Budapest; Attendance: 2,100; Referees: Mitrevski, Todorovki (MKD)
1 November 2022; 18:45	Debreczeni 8	(19–18)	Andersson 7	Riz Levente Sport- és Rendezvényközpont, Budapest; Attendance: 2,100; Referees: Mitrevski, Todorovki (MKD)
1 November 2022; 18:45	1× (yellow card) 1× (suspension)	Report	2× (suspension)	Riz Levente Sport- és Rendezvényközpont, Budapest; Attendance: 2,100; Referees: Mitrevski, Todorovki (MKD)

1 November 2022; 20:45	BM Benidorm (Spain)	29–32	(Iceland) Valur	Palau d´Esports, Benidorm; Attendance: 850; Referees: Madsen, Mortensen (DEN)
1 November 2022; 20:45	Martínez 5	(12–12)	A. Óskarsson 6	Palau d´Esports, Benidorm; Attendance: 850; Referees: Madsen, Mortensen (DEN)
1 November 2022; 20:45	6× (suspension)	Report	6× (suspension) 1× (red card)	Palau d´Esports, Benidorm; Attendance: 850; Referees: Madsen, Mortensen (DEN)

22 November 2022; 18:45	PAUC Handball (France)	33–30	(Hungary) FTC	Aréna du Pays d'Aix, Aix-en-Provence; Attendance: 703; Referees: Jurinović, Mrvica (CRO)
22 November 2022; 18:45	Ong 7	(14–17)	Nagy 6	Aréna du Pays d'Aix, Aix-en-Provence; Attendance: 703; Referees: Jurinović, Mrvica (CRO)
22 November 2022; 18:45	1× (yellow card) 2× (suspension)	Report	3× (suspension)	Aréna du Pays d'Aix, Aix-en-Provence; Attendance: 703; Referees: Jurinović, Mrvica (CRO)

22 November 2022; 20:45	Valur (Iceland)	32–37	(Germany) SG Flensburg-Handewitt	Origo-höllin, Reykjavík; Attendance: 1,750; Referees: Caçador, Nicolau (POR)
22 November 2022; 20:45	B. Óskarsson 9	(16–18)	Einarsson 7	Origo-höllin, Reykjavík; Attendance: 1,750; Referees: Caçador, Nicolau (POR)
22 November 2022; 20:45	2× (yellow card) 5× (suspension)	Report	6× (suspension)	Origo-höllin, Reykjavík; Attendance: 1,750; Referees: Caçador, Nicolau (POR)

22 November 2022; 20:45	BM Benidorm (Spain)	27–29	(Sweden) Ystads IF	Palau d´Esports, Benidorm; Attendance: 400; Referees: Martins, Martins (POR)
22 November 2022; 20:45	Serrano Matias 6	(9–13)	Svensson 8	Palau d´Esports, Benidorm; Attendance: 400; Referees: Martins, Martins (POR)
22 November 2022; 20:45	1× (suspension)	Report	5× (suspension) 1× (red card)	Palau d´Esports, Benidorm; Attendance: 400; Referees: Martins, Martins (POR)

29 November 2022; 17:00	FTC (Hungary)	32–33	(Spain) BM Benidorm	Riz Levente Sport- és Rendezvényközpont, Budapest; Attendance: 1,050; Referees: Boričić, Marković (SRB)
29 November 2022; 17:00	Debreczeni, Ónodi-Jánoskúti 5	(16–14)	Nikčević 9	Riz Levente Sport- és Rendezvényközpont, Budapest; Attendance: 1,050; Referees: Boričić, Marković (SRB)
29 November 2022; 17:00	5× (suspension)	Report	1× (yellow card) 4× (suspension)	Riz Levente Sport- és Rendezvényközpont, Budapest; Attendance: 1,050; Referees: Boričić, Marković (SRB)

29 November 2022; 18:45	Ystads IF (Sweden)	30–26	(Germany) SG Flensburg-Handewitt	Ystad Arena, Ystad; Attendance: 2,465; Referees: Konjičanin, Konjičanin (BIH)
29 November 2022; 18:45	Svensson 8	(17–14)	three players 4	Ystad Arena, Ystad; Attendance: 2,465; Referees: Konjičanin, Konjičanin (BIH)
29 November 2022; 18:45	3× (suspension)	Report	1× (yellow card) 3× (suspension)	Ystad Arena, Ystad; Attendance: 2,465; Referees: Konjičanin, Konjičanin (BIH)

29 November 2022; 20:45	PAUC Handball (France)	32–29	(Iceland) Valur	Aréna du Pays d'Aix, Aix-en-Provence; Attendance: 712; Referees: Bolic, Hurich (AUT)
29 November 2022; 20:45	Loesch 10	(14–15)	A. Óskarsson, Valencia 6	Aréna du Pays d'Aix, Aix-en-Provence; Attendance: 712; Referees: Bolic, Hurich (AUT)
29 November 2022; 20:45	6× (suspension)	Report	1× (yellow card) 6× (suspension) 1× (red card)	Aréna du Pays d'Aix, Aix-en-Provence; Attendance: 712; Referees: Bolic, Hurich (AUT)

6 December 2022; 18:45	PAUC Handball (France)	34–36	(Sweden) Ystads IF	Aréna du Pays d'Aix, Aix-en-Provence; Attendance: 503; Referees: Sekulić, Jovandić (SRB)
6 December 2022; 18:45	three players 6	(18–15)	Svensson 8	Aréna du Pays d'Aix, Aix-en-Provence; Attendance: 503; Referees: Sekulić, Jovandić (SRB)
6 December 2022; 18:45	4× (suspension)	Report	4× (suspension)	Aréna du Pays d'Aix, Aix-en-Provence; Attendance: 503; Referees: Sekulić, Jovandić (SRB)

6 December 2022; 18:45	FTC (Hungary)	33–33	(Iceland) Valur	Riz Levente Sport- és Rendezvényközpont, Budapest; Attendance: 1,100; Referees: Leszczyński, Piechota (POL)
6 December 2022; 18:45	Bognár 7	(14–18)	Valencia 10	Riz Levente Sport- és Rendezvényközpont, Budapest; Attendance: 1,100; Referees: Leszczyński, Piechota (POL)
6 December 2022; 18:45	1× (yellow card) 5× (suspension) 1× (red card)	Report	1× (yellow card) 4× (suspension)	Riz Levente Sport- és Rendezvényközpont, Budapest; Attendance: 1,100; Referees: Leszczyński, Piechota (POL)

6 December 2022; 20:45	BM Benidorm (Spain)	32–38	(Germany) SG Flensburg-Handewitt	Palau d´Esports, Benidorm; Attendance: 700; Referees: Mitrevski, Todorovski (MKD)
6 December 2022; 20:45	Rodríguez Martínez 12	(17–21)	Hald 7	Palau d´Esports, Benidorm; Attendance: 700; Referees: Mitrevski, Todorovski (MKD)
6 December 2022; 20:45	1× (yellow card) 5× (suspension)	Report	1× (yellow card) 8× (suspension)	Palau d´Esports, Benidorm; Attendance: 700; Referees: Mitrevski, Todorovski (MKD)

13 December 2022; 18:45	BM Benidorm (Spain)	33–32	(France) PAUC Handball	Palau d´Esports, Benidorm; Attendance: 550; Referees: Konjičanin, Konjičanin (BIH)
13 December 2022; 18:45	Serrano Matias 8	(17–18)	Ong 7	Palau d´Esports, Benidorm; Attendance: 550; Referees: Konjičanin, Konjičanin (BIH)
13 December 2022; 18:45	4× (suspension)	Report	1× (yellow card) 4× (suspension) 1× (red card)	Palau d´Esports, Benidorm; Attendance: 550; Referees: Konjičanin, Konjičanin (BIH)

13 December 2022; 20:45	Valur (Iceland)	29–32	(Sweden) Ystads IF	Origo-höllin, Reykjavík; Attendance: 989; Referees: Budzák, Záhradník (SVK)
13 December 2022; 20:45	A. Óskarsson 13	(15–16)	Andersson 7	Origo-höllin, Reykjavík; Attendance: 989; Referees: Budzák, Záhradník (SVK)
13 December 2022; 20:45	1× (yellow card) 4× (suspension) 1× (red card)	Report	6× (suspension)	Origo-höllin, Reykjavík; Attendance: 989; Referees: Budzák, Záhradník (SVK)

13 December 2022; 20:45	SG Flensburg-Handewitt (Germany)	42–30	(Hungary) FTC	Flens-Arena, Flensburg; Attendance: 1,429; Referees: Bolic, Hurich (AUT)
13 December 2022; 20:45	Golla 9	(23–15)	Nagy 5	Flens-Arena, Flensburg; Attendance: 1,429; Referees: Bolic, Hurich (AUT)
13 December 2022; 20:45	1× (yellow card)	Report	1× (yellow card) 5× (suspension)	Flens-Arena, Flensburg; Attendance: 1,429; Referees: Bolic, Hurich (AUT)

7 February 2023; 18:45	FTC (Hungary)	28–25	(France) PAUC Handball	Riz Levente Sport- és Rendezvényközpont, Budapest; Attendance: 1,000; Referees: Stark, Ştefan (ROU)
7 February 2023; 18:45	Nagy 7	(15–12)	Vergely 5	Riz Levente Sport- és Rendezvényközpont, Budapest; Attendance: 1,000; Referees: Stark, Ştefan (ROU)
7 February 2023; 18:45	5× (suspension)	Report	1× (yellow card) 1× (suspension)	Riz Levente Sport- és Rendezvényközpont, Budapest; Attendance: 1,000; Referees: Stark, Ştefan (ROU)

7 February 2023; 18:45	Ystads IF (Sweden)	36–30	(Spain) BM Benidorm	Ystad Arena, Ystad; Attendance: 1,026; Referees: Lončar, Lončar (CRO)
7 February 2023; 18:45	Svensson 9	(21–18)	Martínez 7	Ystad Arena, Ystad; Attendance: 1,026; Referees: Lončar, Lončar (CRO)
7 February 2023; 18:45	4× (suspension)	Report	4× (suspension)	Ystad Arena, Ystad; Attendance: 1,026; Referees: Lončar, Lončar (CRO)

7 February 2023; 20:45	SG Flensburg-Handewitt (Germany)	33–30	(Iceland) Valur	Flens-Arena, Flensburg; Attendance: 1,714; Referees: Boričić, Marković (SRB)
7 February 2023; 20:45	Mensing 8	(16–14)	B. Óskarsson 8	Flens-Arena, Flensburg; Attendance: 1,714; Referees: Boričić, Marković (SRB)
7 February 2023; 20:45	2× (yellow card) 4× (suspension)	Report	1× (yellow card) 4× (suspension)	Flens-Arena, Flensburg; Attendance: 1,714; Referees: Boričić, Marković (SRB)

14 February 2023; 18:45	Ystads IF (Sweden)	35–35	(Hungary) FTC	Ystad Arena, Ystad; Attendance: 1,104; Referees: Caçador, Nicolau (POR)
14 February 2023; 18:45	Fernebrand, Månsson 6	(19–18)	Nagy 15	Ystad Arena, Ystad; Attendance: 1,104; Referees: Caçador, Nicolau (POR)
14 February 2023; 18:45	5× (suspension)	Report	2× (yellow card) 5× (suspension) 1× (red card)	Ystad Arena, Ystad; Attendance: 1,104; Referees: Caçador, Nicolau (POR)

14 February 2023; 20:45	Valur (Iceland)	35–29	(Spain) BM Benidorm	Origo-höllin, Reykjavík; Attendance: 1,045; Referees: Braseth, Sundet (NOR)
14 February 2023; 20:45	Magnússon 9	(17–15)	Martínez 7	Origo-höllin, Reykjavík; Attendance: 1,045; Referees: Braseth, Sundet (NOR)
14 February 2023; 20:45	3× (suspension) 1× (red card)	Report	3× (suspension)	Origo-höllin, Reykjavík; Attendance: 1,045; Referees: Braseth, Sundet (NOR)

14 February 2023; 20:45	PAUC Handball (France)	21–29	(Germany) SG Flensburg-Handewitt	Aréna du Pays d'Aix, Aix-en-Provence; Attendance: 2,303; Referees: Budzák, Záhradník (SVK)
14 February 2023; 20:45	Claire 6	(9–14)	Mensing 5	Aréna du Pays d'Aix, Aix-en-Provence; Attendance: 2,303; Referees: Budzák, Záhradník (SVK)
14 February 2023; 20:45	4× (suspension)	Report	1× (yellow card) 2× (suspension)	Aréna du Pays d'Aix, Aix-en-Provence; Attendance: 2,303; Referees: Budzák, Záhradník (SVK)

21 February 2023; 18:45	SG Flensburg-Handewitt (Germany)	30–23	(Sweden) Ystads IF	Flens-Arena, Flensburg; Attendance: 3,031; Referees: Madsen, Mortensen (DEN)
21 February 2023; 18:45	Mensah 9	(12–13)	Svensson 6	Flens-Arena, Flensburg; Attendance: 3,031; Referees: Madsen, Mortensen (DEN)
21 February 2023; 18:45	1× (suspension)	Report	4× (suspension)	Flens-Arena, Flensburg; Attendance: 3,031; Referees: Madsen, Mortensen (DEN)

21 February 2023; 20:45	Valur (Iceland)	40–31	(France) PAUC Handball	Origo-höllin, Reykjavík; Attendance: 1,554; Referees: Nygaard, Pedersen (DEN)
21 February 2023; 20:45	Valencia 8	(19–16)	Loesch 6	Origo-höllin, Reykjavík; Attendance: 1,554; Referees: Nygaard, Pedersen (DEN)
21 February 2023; 20:45	2× (yellow card) 7× (suspension) 1× (red card)	Report	1× (yellow card) 6× (suspension)	Origo-höllin, Reykjavík; Attendance: 1,554; Referees: Nygaard, Pedersen (DEN)

21 February 2023; 20:45	BM Benidorm (Spain)	23–27	(Hungary) FTC	Palau d´Esports, Benidorm; Attendance: 500; Referees: Hannes, Hannes (GER)
21 February 2023; 20:45	Barceló, Martínez 4	(9–14)	Nagy 7	Palau d´Esports, Benidorm; Attendance: 500; Referees: Hannes, Hannes (GER)
21 February 2023; 20:45	1× (yellow card) 4× (suspension)	Report	1× (yellow card) 3× (suspension)	Palau d´Esports, Benidorm; Attendance: 500; Referees: Hannes, Hannes (GER)

28 February 2023; 18:45	Ystads IF (Sweden)	33–35	(Iceland) Valur	Ystad Arena, Ystad; Attendance: 1,297; Referees: Barysas, Petrusis (LTU)
28 February 2023; 18:45	Månsson 8	(13–21)	Valencia 7	Ystad Arena, Ystad; Attendance: 1,297; Referees: Barysas, Petrusis (LTU)
28 February 2023; 18:45	3× (suspension)	Report	3× (suspension)	Ystad Arena, Ystad; Attendance: 1,297; Referees: Barysas, Petrusis (LTU)

28 February 2023; 20:45	PAUC Handball (France)	39–29	(Spain) BM Benidorm	Aréna du Pays d'Aix, Aix-en-Provence; Attendance: 1,579; Referees: Vešović, Mitrović (MNE)
28 February 2023; 20:45	Loesch 11	(17–14)	Redondo 5	Aréna du Pays d'Aix, Aix-en-Provence; Attendance: 1,579; Referees: Vešović, Mitrović (MNE)
28 February 2023; 20:45	2× (yellow card) 1× (suspension)	Report	2× (yellow card) 5× (suspension)	Aréna du Pays d'Aix, Aix-en-Provence; Attendance: 1,579; Referees: Vešović, Mitrović (MNE)

28 February 2023; 20:45	FTC (Hungary)	27–27	(Germany) SG Flensburg-Handewitt	Riz Levente Sport- és Rendezvényközpont, Budapest; Attendance: 1,500; Referees: Kaluđerović, Vujačić (MNE)
28 February 2023; 20:45	Nagy 9	(15–13)	Mensing 7	Riz Levente Sport- és Rendezvényközpont, Budapest; Attendance: 1,500; Referees: Kaluđerović, Vujačić (MNE)
28 February 2023; 20:45	1× (suspension)	Report	1× (yellow card) 7× (suspension) 1× (red card)	Riz Levente Sport- és Rendezvényközpont, Budapest; Attendance: 1,500; Referees: Kaluđerović, Vujačić (MNE)

=== Group C ===
Pos	Team	Pld	W	D	L	GF	GA	GD	Pts	Qualification
1	(Croatia) RK Nexe	10	8	0	2	311	281	+30	16	Knockout stage
2	(Portugal) Sporting CP	10	7	0	3	312	294	+18	14	Knockout stage
3	(Spain) Fraikin BM Granollers	10	6	1	3	315	301	+14	13	Knockout stage
4	(Denmark) Skjern Håndbold	10	5	0	5	294	284	+10	10	Knockout stage
5	(Austria) Alpla HC Hard	10	1	2	7	270	300	−30	4	
6	(Hungary) Balatonfüredi KSE	10	1	1	8	274	316	−42	3	

Source: EHF
Rules for classification: Tiebreakers

25 October 2022; 17:00	Balatonfüredi KSE (Hungary)	25–30	(Spain) Fraikin BM Granollers	Veszprém Aréna, Veszprém; Attendance: 500; Referees: Boričić, Marković (SRB)
25 October 2022; 17:00	Sretenović 5	(12–15)	Valera 14	Veszprém Aréna, Veszprém; Attendance: 500; Referees: Boričić, Marković (SRB)
25 October 2022; 17:00	3× (yellow card) 1× (suspension)	Report	4× (yellow card) 1× (suspension)	Veszprém Aréna, Veszprém; Attendance: 500; Referees: Boričić, Marković (SRB)

25 October 2022; 18:45	Skjern Håndbold (Denmark)	29–30	(Croatia) RK Nexe	Skjern Bank Arena, Skjern; Attendance: 2,314; Referees: Pirvu, Potirniche (ROU)
25 October 2022; 18:45	Tangen 8	(14–14)	Severec 7	Skjern Bank Arena, Skjern; Attendance: 2,314; Referees: Pirvu, Potirniche (ROU)
25 October 2022; 18:45	1× (suspension)	Report	1× (yellow card) 5× (suspension) 1× (red card)	Skjern Bank Arena, Skjern; Attendance: 2,314; Referees: Pirvu, Potirniche (ROU)

25 October 2022; 20:45	Sporting CP (Portugal)	31–30	(Austria) Alpla HC Hard	Pavilhão João Rocha, Lisbon; Attendance: 509; Referees: Covalciuc, Covalciuc (MDA)
25 October 2022; 20:45	F. Costa 7	(18–18)	Horvat 8	Pavilhão João Rocha, Lisbon; Attendance: 509; Referees: Covalciuc, Covalciuc (MDA)
25 October 2022; 20:45	3× (suspension)	Report	5× (suspension)	Pavilhão João Rocha, Lisbon; Attendance: 509; Referees: Covalciuc, Covalciuc (MDA)

1 November 2022; 18:45	Fraikin BM Granollers (Spain)	32–29	(Portugal) Sporting CP	Palau d'Esports de Granollers, Granollers; Attendance: 1,296; Referees: Carmaux, Mursch (FRA)
1 November 2022; 18:45	Valera 7	(17–12)	Salvador 7	Palau d'Esports de Granollers, Granollers; Attendance: 1,296; Referees: Carmaux, Mursch (FRA)
1 November 2022; 18:45	3× (suspension)	Report	1× (yellow card) 6× (suspension)	Palau d'Esports de Granollers, Granollers; Attendance: 1,296; Referees: Carmaux, Mursch (FRA)

1 November 2022; 20:45	Alpla HC Hard (Austria)	27–32	(Denmark) Skjern Håndbold	Sporthalle am See, Hard; Attendance: 1,500; Referees: Brunner, Salah (SUI)
1 November 2022; 20:45	Horvat 10	(15–15)	Jönsson, Pettersen 8	Sporthalle am See, Hard; Attendance: 1,500; Referees: Brunner, Salah (SUI)
1 November 2022; 20:45	2× (yellow card) 2× (suspension)	Report	1× (yellow card) 2× (suspension)	Sporthalle am See, Hard; Attendance: 1,500; Referees: Brunner, Salah (SUI)

1 November 2022; 20:45	RK Nexe (Croatia)	37–23	(Hungary) Balatonfüredi KSE	OS Kralja Tomislava, Našice; Attendance: 2,000; Referees: Beqiri, Krasniqi (KOS)
1 November 2022; 20:45	three players 6	(18–10)	Szöllősi 5	OS Kralja Tomislava, Našice; Attendance: 2,000; Referees: Beqiri, Krasniqi (KOS)
1 November 2022; 20:45	1× (yellow card) 4× (suspension)	Report	2× (yellow card) 2× (suspension)	OS Kralja Tomislava, Našice; Attendance: 2,000; Referees: Beqiri, Krasniqi (KOS)

22 November 2022; 17:00	Balatonfüredi KSE (Hungary)	28–31	(Denmark) Skjern Håndbold	Veszprém Aréna, Veszprém; Attendance: 300; Referees: Gasmi, Gasmi (FRA)
22 November 2022; 17:00	Gostovic 9	(15–16)	Jönsson, Tangen 8	Veszprém Aréna, Veszprém; Attendance: 300; Referees: Gasmi, Gasmi (FRA)
22 November 2022; 17:00	5× (suspension)	Report	4× (suspension)	Veszprém Aréna, Veszprém; Attendance: 300; Referees: Gasmi, Gasmi (FRA)

22 November 2022; 18:45	Fraikin BM Granollers (Spain)	38–28	(Austria) Alpla HC Hard	Palau d'Esports de Granollers, Granollers; Attendance: 1,325; Referees: Leszczyński, Piechota (POL)
22 November 2022; 18:45	Franco i Miro 6	(18–14)	Raschle 6	Palau d'Esports de Granollers, Granollers; Attendance: 1,325; Referees: Leszczyński, Piechota (POL)
22 November 2022; 18:45	4× (suspension)	Report	5× (suspension)	Palau d'Esports de Granollers, Granollers; Attendance: 1,325; Referees: Leszczyński, Piechota (POL)

22 November 2022; 20:45	RK Nexe (Croatia)	32–31	(Portugal) Sporting CP	OS Kralja Tomislava, Našice; Attendance: 2,000; Referees: Mandák, Rudinský (SVK)
22 November 2022; 20:45	Melić 11	(22–16)	M. Costa 12	OS Kralja Tomislava, Našice; Attendance: 2,000; Referees: Mandák, Rudinský (SVK)
22 November 2022; 20:45	1× (yellow card) 5× (suspension)	Report	2× (yellow card) 5× (suspension)	OS Kralja Tomislava, Našice; Attendance: 2,000; Referees: Mandák, Rudinský (SVK)

29 November 2022; 20:45	Sporting CP (Portugal)	35–32	(Hungary) Balatonfüredi KSE	Pavilhão João Rocha, Lisbon; Attendance: 357; Referees: Bethmann, Tzaferopoulos (GRE)
29 November 2022; 20:45	Salvador 7	(17–17)	Gostović 10	Pavilhão João Rocha, Lisbon; Attendance: 357; Referees: Bethmann, Tzaferopoulos (GRE)
29 November 2022; 20:45	3× (suspension)	Report	2× (yellow card) 3× (suspension)	Pavilhão João Rocha, Lisbon; Attendance: 357; Referees: Bethmann, Tzaferopoulos (GRE)

29 November 2022; 20:45	Alpla HC Hard (Austria)	24–35	(Croatia) RK Nexe	Sporthalle am See, Hard; Attendance: 1,000; Referees: Carmaux, Mursch (FRA)
29 November 2022; 20:45	Horvat, Schnabl 7	(11–18)	Melić 8	Sporthalle am See, Hard; Attendance: 1,000; Referees: Carmaux, Mursch (FRA)
29 November 2022; 20:45	1× (yellow card) 3× (suspension)	Report	1× (yellow card) 4× (suspension)	Sporthalle am See, Hard; Attendance: 1,000; Referees: Carmaux, Mursch (FRA)

29 November 2022; 20:45	Skjern Håndbold (Denmark)	32–29	(Spain) Fraikin BM Granollers	Skjern Bank Arena, Skjern; Attendance: 2,029; Referees: Baumgart, Wild (GER)
29 November 2022; 20:45	Jönsson 7	(15–16)	Faruk 8	Skjern Bank Arena, Skjern; Attendance: 2,029; Referees: Baumgart, Wild (GER)
29 November 2022; 20:45	1× (yellow card) 5× (suspension) 1× (red card)	Report	3× (suspension)	Skjern Bank Arena, Skjern; Attendance: 2,029; Referees: Baumgart, Wild (GER)

6 December 2022; 18:45	RK Nexe (Croatia)	39–36	(Spain) Fraikin BM Granollers	OS Kralja Tomislava, Našice; Attendance: 2,000; Referees: Metalari, Nikolovski (MKD)
6 December 2022; 18:45	Pribetić 7	(19–16)	Faruk, García Robledo 7	OS Kralja Tomislava, Našice; Attendance: 2,000; Referees: Metalari, Nikolovski (MKD)
6 December 2022; 18:45	1× (yellow card) 3× (suspension)	Report	3× (suspension)	OS Kralja Tomislava, Našice; Attendance: 2,000; Referees: Metalari, Nikolovski (MKD)

6 December 2022; 20:45	Skjern Håndbold (Denmark)	28–30	(Portugal) Sporting CP	Skjern Bank Arena, Skjern; Attendance: 2,037; Referees: Gatelis, Mažeika (LTU)
6 December 2022; 20:45	Jönsson 9	(15–12)	M. Costa 10	Skjern Bank Arena, Skjern; Attendance: 2,037; Referees: Gatelis, Mažeika (LTU)
6 December 2022; 20:45	1× (yellow card) 5× (suspension)	Report	1× (yellow card) 4× (suspension)	Skjern Bank Arena, Skjern; Attendance: 2,037; Referees: Gatelis, Mažeika (LTU)

6 December 2022; 20:45	Alpla HC Hard (Austria)	30–30	(Hungary) Balatonfüredi KSE	Sporthalle am See, Hard; Attendance: 1,000; Referees: Baumgart, Wild (GER)
6 December 2022; 20:45	Raschle 8	(14–15)	Gostović 9	Sporthalle am See, Hard; Attendance: 1,000; Referees: Baumgart, Wild (GER)
6 December 2022; 20:45	1× (yellow card) 4× (suspension)	Report	2× (yellow card) 4× (suspension)	Sporthalle am See, Hard; Attendance: 1,000; Referees: Baumgart, Wild (GER)

13 December 2022; 17:00	Balatonfüredi KSE (Hungary)	27–26	(Austria) Alpla HC Hard	Veszprém Aréna, Veszprém; Attendance: 470; Referees: Mandák, Rudinský (SVK)
13 December 2022; 17:00	Gostović, Sretenović 6	(13–15)	Schnabl 10	Veszprém Aréna, Veszprém; Attendance: 470; Referees: Mandák, Rudinský (SVK)
13 December 2022; 17:00	1× (yellow card) 8× (suspension) 1× (red card)	Report	1× (yellow card) 8× (suspension)	Veszprém Aréna, Veszprém; Attendance: 470; Referees: Mandák, Rudinský (SVK)

13 December 2022; 20:45	Fraikin BM Granollers (Spain)	25–22	(Croatia) RK Nexe	Palau d'Esports de Granollers, Granollers; Attendance: 1,000; Referees: Hannes, Hannes (GER)
13 December 2022; 20:45	three players 5	(14–11)	Melić 5	Palau d'Esports de Granollers, Granollers; Attendance: 1,000; Referees: Hannes, Hannes (GER)
13 December 2022; 20:45	1× (yellow card) 2× (suspension)	Report	1× (yellow card) 4× (suspension) 1× (red card)	Palau d'Esports de Granollers, Granollers; Attendance: 1,000; Referees: Hannes, Hannes (GER)

13 December 2022; 20:45	Sporting CP (Portugal)	28–24	(Denmark) Skjern Håndbold	Pavilhão João Rocha, Lisbon; Attendance: 0 (Note: The match between Sporting and Skjern was played without spectators due to bad weather conditions.); Referees: Boričić, Marković (SRB)
13 December 2022; 20:45	F. Costa 6	(13–13)	Holand Pettersen, Møller Uth 6	Pavilhão João Rocha, Lisbon; Attendance: 0 Referees: Boričić, Marković (SRB)
13 December 2022; 20:45	2× (yellow card) 3× (suspension)	Report	2× (yellow card) 5× (suspension) 1× (red card)	Pavilhão João Rocha, Lisbon; Attendance: 0 Referees: Boričić, Marković (SRB)

7 February 2023; 20:45	RK Nexe (Croatia)	29–28	(Denmark) Skjern Håndbold	OS Kralja Tomislava, Našice; Attendance: 2,000; Referees: Baumgart, Wild (GER)
7 February 2023; 20:45	Jelinić 6	(12–14)	Jönsson, Tangen 6	OS Kralja Tomislava, Našice; Attendance: 2,000; Referees: Baumgart, Wild (GER)
7 February 2023; 20:45	1× (yellow card) 2× (suspension)	Report	1× (yellow card) 2× (suspension)	OS Kralja Tomislava, Našice; Attendance: 2,000; Referees: Baumgart, Wild (GER)

7 February 2023; 20:45	Fraikin BM Granollers (Spain)	33–30	(Hungary) Balatonfüredi KSE	Palau d'Esports de Granollers, Granollers; Attendance: 800; Referees: Mitrevski, Todorovski (MKD)
7 February 2023; 20:45	García Robledo 9	(17–14)	Gostović 8	Palau d'Esports de Granollers, Granollers; Attendance: 800; Referees: Mitrevski, Todorovski (MKD)
7 February 2023; 20:45	1× (yellow card) 3× (suspension)	Report	2× (yellow card) 4× (suspension)	Palau d'Esports de Granollers, Granollers; Attendance: 800; Referees: Mitrevski, Todorovski (MKD)

7 February 2023; 20:45	Alpla HC Hard (Austria)	26–31	(Portugal) Sporting CP	Sporthalle am See, Hard; Attendance: 1,000; Referees: Pirvu, Potirniche (ROU)
7 February 2023; 20:45	Predragović 8	(12–17)	M. Costa 12	Sporthalle am See, Hard; Attendance: 1,000; Referees: Pirvu, Potirniche (ROU)
7 February 2023; 20:45	2× (yellow card) 5× (suspension)	Report	1× (yellow card) 6× (suspension)	Sporthalle am See, Hard; Attendance: 1,000; Referees: Pirvu, Potirniche (ROU)

14 February 2023; 17:00	Balatonfüredi KSE (Hungary)	28–31	(Croatia) RK Nexe	Veszprém Aréna, Veszprém; Attendance: 300; Referees: Mošorinski, Pandžić (SRB)
14 February 2023; 17:00	Sretenović 8	(14–16)	Pribetić 7	Veszprém Aréna, Veszprém; Attendance: 300; Referees: Mošorinski, Pandžić (SRB)
14 February 2023; 17:00	1× (yellow card) 4× (suspension) 1× (red card)	Report	2× (yellow card) 4× (suspension)	Veszprém Aréna, Veszprém; Attendance: 300; Referees: Mošorinski, Pandžić (SRB)

14 February 2023; 20:45	Skjern Håndbold (Denmark)	27–23	(Austria) Alpla HC Hard	Skjern Bank Arena, Skjern; Attendance: 2,118; Referees: Metalari, Nikolovski (MKD)
14 February 2023; 20:45	Bergholt 7	(13–10)	Raschle 5	Skjern Bank Arena, Skjern; Attendance: 2,118; Referees: Metalari, Nikolovski (MKD)
14 February 2023; 20:45	3× (suspension)	Report	1× (yellow card) 5× (suspension)	Skjern Bank Arena, Skjern; Attendance: 2,118; Referees: Metalari, Nikolovski (MKD)

14 February 2023; 20:45	Sporting CP (Portugal)	38–31	(Spain) Fraikin BM Granollers	Pavilhão João Rocha, Lisbon; Attendance: 549; Referees: Biró, Kiss (HUN)
14 February 2023; 20:45	M. Costa 9	(15–14)	García Robledo 6	Pavilhão João Rocha, Lisbon; Attendance: 549; Referees: Biró, Kiss (HUN)
14 February 2023; 20:45	4× (suspension)	Report	1× (yellow card) 3× (suspension)	Pavilhão João Rocha, Lisbon; Attendance: 549; Referees: Biró, Kiss (HUN)

21 February 2023; 18:45	Balatonfüredi KSE (Hungary)	25–31	(Portugal) Sporting CP	Veszprém Aréna, Veszprém; Attendance: 400; Referees: Backović, Palačković (SLO)
21 February 2023; 18:45	Szűcs 5	(13–16)	F. Costa 9	Veszprém Aréna, Veszprém; Attendance: 400; Referees: Backović, Palačković (SLO)
21 February 2023; 18:45	1× (yellow card) 3× (suspension)	Report	2× (yellow card) 5× (suspension)	Veszprém Aréna, Veszprém; Attendance: 400; Referees: Backović, Palačković (SLO)

21 February 2023; 18:45	Fraikin BM Granollers (Spain)	34–31	(Denmark) Skjern Håndbold	Palau d'Esports de Granollers, Granollers; Attendance: 850; Referees: Sekulić, Jovandić (SRB)
21 February 2023; 18:45	García Robledo 7	(15–15)	Jönsson 7	Palau d'Esports de Granollers, Granollers; Attendance: 850; Referees: Sekulić, Jovandić (SRB)
21 February 2023; 18:45	2× (suspension)	Report	1× (yellow card) 2× (suspension)	Palau d'Esports de Granollers, Granollers; Attendance: 850; Referees: Sekulić, Jovandić (SRB)

21 February 2023; 20:45	RK Nexe (Croatia)	22–29	(Austria) Alpla HC Hard	OS Kralja Tomislava, Našice; Attendance: 1,500; Referees: Kulović, Škaljić (BIH)
21 February 2023; 20:45	Melić 6	(12–14)	Antanavičius, Raschle 5	OS Kralja Tomislava, Našice; Attendance: 1,500; Referees: Kulović, Škaljić (BIH)
21 February 2023; 20:45	2× (yellow card) 6× (suspension)	Report	1× (yellow card) 6× (suspension)	OS Kralja Tomislava, Našice; Attendance: 1,500; Referees: Kulović, Škaljić (BIH)

28 February 2023; 18:45	Skjern Håndbold (Denmark)	32–26	(Hungary) Balatonfüredi KSE	Skjern Bank Arena, Skjern; Attendance: 2,325; Referees: Jerlecki, Łabuń (POL)
28 February 2023; 18:45	Tangen 7	(18–14)	Varga 10	Skjern Bank Arena, Skjern; Attendance: 2,325; Referees: Jerlecki, Łabuń (POL)
28 February 2023; 18:45	2× (suspension)	Report	3× (suspension)	Skjern Bank Arena, Skjern; Attendance: 2,325; Referees: Jerlecki, Łabuń (POL)

28 February 2023; 20:45	Sporting CP (Portugal)	28–34	(Croatia) RK Nexe	Pavilhão João Rocha, Lisbon; Attendance: 1,028; Referees: Erdoğan, Özdeniz (TUR)
28 February 2023; 20:45	three players 5	(14–14)	Jelinić 9	Pavilhão João Rocha, Lisbon; Attendance: 1,028; Referees: Erdoğan, Özdeniz (TUR)
28 February 2023; 20:45	3× (yellow card)	Report	2× (yellow card) 6× (suspension)	Pavilhão João Rocha, Lisbon; Attendance: 1,028; Referees: Erdoğan, Özdeniz (TUR)

28 February 2023; 20:45	Alpla HC Hard (Austria)	27–27	(Spain) Fraikin BM Granollers	Sporthalle am See, Hard; Attendance: 800; Referees: Bethmann, Tzaferopoulos (GRE)
28 February 2023; 20:45	Schnabl 10	(13–13)	García Robledo 5	Sporthalle am See, Hard; Attendance: 800; Referees: Bethmann, Tzaferopoulos (GRE)
28 February 2023; 20:45	2× (yellow card) 9× (suspension)	Report	2× (yellow card) 3× (suspension)	Sporthalle am See, Hard; Attendance: 800; Referees: Bethmann, Tzaferopoulos (GRE)

=== Group D ===
Pos	Team	Pld	W	D	L	GF	GA	GD	Pts	Qualification
1	(Germany) Füchse Berlin	10	10	0	0	343	266	+77	20	Knockout stage
2	(Denmark) Skanderborg-Aarhus	10	7	0	3	307	276	+31	14	Knockout stage
3	(Spain) Bidasoa Irun	10	4	1	5	295	296	−1	9	Knockout stage
4	(Ukraine) HC Motor	10	3	1	6	280	305	−25	7	Knockout stage
5	(North Macedonia) Eurofarm Pelister	10	2	2	6	271	303	−32	6	
6	(Portugal) Águas Santas Milaneza	10	1	2	7	252	302	−50	4	

Source: EHF
Rules for classification: Tiebreakers

25 October 2022; 18:45	HC Motor (Ukraine)	27–38	(Germany) Füchse Berlin	Castello Düsseldorf, Düsseldorf, Germany (Note: Due to the Russian invasion of Ukraine, HC Motor played their home matches at neutral venues.); Attendance: 411; Referees: Canbro, Kliko (SWE)
25 October 2022; 18:45	Turchenko 9	(10–19)	Vujović 9	Castello Düsseldorf, Düsseldorf, Germany; Attendance: 411; Referees: Canbro, Kliko (SWE)
25 October 2022; 18:45	3× (yellow card) 1× (suspension)	Report	2× (yellow card)	Castello Düsseldorf, Düsseldorf, Germany; Attendance: 411; Referees: Canbro, Kliko (SWE)

25 October 2022; 20:45	Bidasoa Irun (Spain)	35–26	(Portugal) Águas Santas Milaneza	Polideportivo Artaleku, Irun; Attendance: 1,424; Referees: Sekulić, Jovandić (SRB)
25 October 2022; 20:45	three players 6	(16–13)	Furtado, Gomes 4	Polideportivo Artaleku, Irun; Attendance: 1,424; Referees: Sekulić, Jovandić (SRB)
25 October 2022; 20:45	1× (yellow card) 3× (suspension)	Report	6× (suspension)	Polideportivo Artaleku, Irun; Attendance: 1,424; Referees: Sekulić, Jovandić (SRB)

25 October 2022; 20:45	Eurofarm Pelister (North Macedonia)	27–30	(Denmark) Skanderborg-Aarhus	Boro Čurlevski Sports Hall, Bitola; Attendance: 2,800; Referees: Baumgart, Wild (GER)
25 October 2022; 20:45	Hosni, Henneberg 5	(12–16)	West Av Teigum 11	Boro Čurlevski Sports Hall, Bitola; Attendance: 2,800; Referees: Baumgart, Wild (GER)
25 October 2022; 20:45	1× (yellow card) 2× (suspension)	Report	1× (yellow card) 2× (suspension)	Boro Čurlevski Sports Hall, Bitola; Attendance: 2,800; Referees: Baumgart, Wild (GER)

1 November 2022; 18:45	HC Motor (Ukraine)	31–37	(Denmark) Skanderborg-Aarhus	Castello Düsseldorf, Düsseldorf, Germany; Attendance: 329; Referees: Pavićević, Ražnatović (MNE)
1 November 2022; 18:45	Turchenko 10	(16–21)	T. Arnoldsen 12	Castello Düsseldorf, Düsseldorf, Germany; Attendance: 329; Referees: Pavićević, Ražnatović (MNE)
1 November 2022; 18:45	3× (suspension)	Report	1× (yellow card) 4× (suspension)	Castello Düsseldorf, Düsseldorf, Germany; Attendance: 329; Referees: Pavićević, Ražnatović (MNE)

1 November 2022; 20:45	Águas Santas Milaneza (Portugal)	27–29	(North Macedonia) Eurofarm Pelister	Pavilhão Municipal da Póvoa de Varzim, Póvoa de Varzim; Attendance: 502; Referees: Bolic, Hurich (AUT)
1 November 2022; 20:45	four players 4	(12–15)	Henneberg 7	Pavilhão Municipal da Póvoa de Varzim, Póvoa de Varzim; Attendance: 502; Referees: Bolic, Hurich (AUT)
1 November 2022; 20:45	7× (suspension) 2× (red card)	Report	1× (yellow card) 1× (suspension)	Pavilhão Municipal da Póvoa de Varzim, Póvoa de Varzim; Attendance: 502; Referees: Bolic, Hurich (AUT)

1 November 2022; 20:45	Füchse Berlin (Germany)	34–29	(Spain) Bidasoa Irun	Max-Schmeling-Halle, Berlin; Attendance: 4,517; Referees: Jorum, Kleven (NOR)
1 November 2022; 20:45	Lichtlein 7	(18–15)	Azkue Saizar 10	Max-Schmeling-Halle, Berlin; Attendance: 4,517; Referees: Jorum, Kleven (NOR)
1 November 2022; 20:45	1× (yellow card) 4× (suspension)	Report	5× (suspension)	Max-Schmeling-Halle, Berlin; Attendance: 4,517; Referees: Jorum, Kleven (NOR)

22 November 2022; 18:45	Eurofarm Pelister (North Macedonia)	34–43	(Germany) Füchse Berlin	Boro Čurlevski Sports Hall, Bitola; Attendance: 2,500; Referees: Biró, Kiss (HUN)
22 November 2022; 18:45	Peshevski 8	(14–22)	Vujović 8	Boro Čurlevski Sports Hall, Bitola; Attendance: 2,500; Referees: Biró, Kiss (HUN)
22 November 2022; 18:45	1× (suspension)	Report	2× (suspension)	Boro Čurlevski Sports Hall, Bitola; Attendance: 2,500; Referees: Biró, Kiss (HUN)

22 November 2022; 20:45	Bidasoa Irun (Spain)	26–22	(Ukraine) HC Motor	Polideportivo Artaleku, Irun; Attendance: 1,484; Referees: Andorka, Hucker (HUN)
22 November 2022; 20:45	Mitic, Azkue Saizar 5	(9–12)	Horiha, Dmytro Tiutiunnyk 5	Polideportivo Artaleku, Irun; Attendance: 1,484; Referees: Andorka, Hucker (HUN)
22 November 2022; 20:45	4× (suspension)	Report	1× (yellow card) 5× (suspension)	Polideportivo Artaleku, Irun; Attendance: 1,484; Referees: Andorka, Hucker (HUN)

22 November 2022; 20:45	Águas Santas Milaneza (Portugal)	25–34	(Denmark) Skanderborg-Aarhus	Pavilhão Municipal da Póvoa de Varzim, Póvoa de Varzim; Attendance: 400; Referees: Jerlecki, Łabuń (POL)
22 November 2022; 20:45	Lima 7	(11–17)	Balling Christensen 7	Pavilhão Municipal da Póvoa de Varzim, Póvoa de Varzim; Attendance: 400; Referees: Jerlecki, Łabuń (POL)
22 November 2022; 20:45	2× (suspension)	Report	5× (suspension)	Pavilhão Municipal da Póvoa de Varzim, Póvoa de Varzim; Attendance: 400; Referees: Jerlecki, Łabuń (POL)

29 November 2022; 18:45	Skanderborg-Aarhus (Denmark)	38–27	(Spain) Bidasoa Irun	Skanderborg Fælled, Skanderborg; Attendance: 1,111; Referees: Mošorinski, Pandžić (SRB)
29 November 2022; 18:45	Mollerup 9	(21–13)	Mitić, Nieto Marcos 5	Skanderborg Fælled, Skanderborg; Attendance: 1,111; Referees: Mošorinski, Pandžić (SRB)
29 November 2022; 18:45	2× (yellow card) 1× (suspension)	Report	2× (yellow card)	Skanderborg Fælled, Skanderborg; Attendance: 1,111; Referees: Mošorinski, Pandžić (SRB)

29 November 2022; 18:45	HC Motor (Ukraine)	30–33	(North Macedonia) Eurofarm Pelister	Castello Düsseldorf, Düsseldorf, Germany; Attendance: 355; Referees: Lončar, Lončar (CRO)
29 November 2022; 18:45	Turchenko 7	(16–18)	Henneberg 14	Castello Düsseldorf, Düsseldorf, Germany; Attendance: 355; Referees: Lončar, Lončar (CRO)
29 November 2022; 18:45	5× (suspension)	Report	3× (suspension)	Castello Düsseldorf, Düsseldorf, Germany; Attendance: 355; Referees: Lončar, Lončar (CRO)

29 November 2022; 20:45	Füchse Berlin (Germany)	34–20	(Portugal) Águas Santas Milaneza	Max-Schmeling-Halle, Berlin; Attendance: 3,247; Referees: Budzák, Záhradník (SVK)
29 November 2022; 20:45	Vujović 13	(17–9)	Oliveira 8	Max-Schmeling-Halle, Berlin; Attendance: 3,247; Referees: Budzák, Záhradník (SVK)
29 November 2022; 20:45	3× (suspension)	Report	3× (suspension)	Max-Schmeling-Halle, Berlin; Attendance: 3,247; Referees: Budzák, Záhradník (SVK)

6 December 2022; 18:45	Füchse Berlin (Germany)	30–24	(Denmark) Skanderborg-Aarhus	Max-Schmeling-Halle, Berlin; Attendance: 4,700; Referees: Pirvu, Potirniche (ROU)
6 December 2022; 18:45	Vujović 7	(15–13)	Balling Christensen 9	Max-Schmeling-Halle, Berlin; Attendance: 4,700; Referees: Pirvu, Potirniche (ROU)
6 December 2022; 18:45	1× (yellow card) 2× (suspension)	Report	2× (suspension)	Max-Schmeling-Halle, Berlin; Attendance: 4,700; Referees: Pirvu, Potirniche (ROU)

6 December 2022; 20:45	Águas Santas Milaneza (Portugal)	26–26	(Ukraine) HC Motor	Pavilhão Municipal da Póvoa de Varzim, Póvoa de Varzim; Attendance: 240; Referees: Barysas, Petrusis (LTU)
6 December 2022; 20:45	Moreira Pinto 9	(14–15)	Turchenko 7	Pavilhão Municipal da Póvoa de Varzim, Póvoa de Varzim; Attendance: 240; Referees: Barysas, Petrusis (LTU)
6 December 2022; 20:45	1× (yellow card) 3× (suspension)	Report	1× (yellow card) 6× (suspension)	Pavilhão Municipal da Póvoa de Varzim, Póvoa de Varzim; Attendance: 240; Referees: Barysas, Petrusis (LTU)

6 December 2022; 20:45	Bidasoa Irun (Spain)	32–20	(North Macedonia) Eurofarm Pelister	Polideportivo Artaleku, Irun; Attendance: 1,681; Referees: Gasmi, Gasmi (FRA)
6 December 2022; 20:45	Cortés 6	(20–12)	Henneberg 4	Polideportivo Artaleku, Irun; Attendance: 1,681; Referees: Gasmi, Gasmi (FRA)
6 December 2022; 20:45	5× (suspension)	Report	2× (suspension)	Polideportivo Artaleku, Irun; Attendance: 1,681; Referees: Gasmi, Gasmi (FRA)

13 December 2022; 18:45	HC Motor (Ukraine)	30–24	(Portugal) Águas Santas Milaneza	Castello Düsseldorf, Düsseldorf, Germany; Attendance: 100; Referees: Andreou, Panayides (CYP)
13 December 2022; 18:45	Turchenko 10	(13–8)	Baptista 7	Castello Düsseldorf, Düsseldorf, Germany; Attendance: 100; Referees: Andreou, Panayides (CYP)
13 December 2022; 18:45	2× (yellow card) 8× (suspension)	Report	2× (yellow card) 5× (suspension)	Castello Düsseldorf, Düsseldorf, Germany; Attendance: 100; Referees: Andreou, Panayides (CYP)

13 December 2022; 18:45	Skanderborg-Aarhus (Denmark)	28–29	(Germany) Füchse Berlin	Skanderborg Fælled, Skanderborg; Attendance: 2,240; Referees: Horváth, Marton (HUN)
13 December 2022; 18:45	Balling Christensen 6	(16–15)	Lindberg 8	Skanderborg Fælled, Skanderborg; Attendance: 2,240; Referees: Horváth, Marton (HUN)
13 December 2022; 18:45	2× (yellow card) 6× (suspension)	Report	1× (yellow card) 4× (suspension)	Skanderborg Fælled, Skanderborg; Attendance: 2,240; Referees: Horváth, Marton (HUN)

13 December 2022; 20:45	Eurofarm Pelister (North Macedonia)	29–29	(Spain) Bidasoa Irun	Boro Čurlevski Sports Hall, Bitola; Attendance: 1,500; Referees: Ivanović, Vujisić (MNE)
13 December 2022; 20:45	Hosni 8	(17–16)	Marcos 6	Boro Čurlevski Sports Hall, Bitola; Attendance: 1,500; Referees: Ivanović, Vujisić (MNE)
13 December 2022; 20:45	5× (suspension)	Report	2× (yellow card) 7× (suspension) 1× (red card)	Boro Čurlevski Sports Hall, Bitola; Attendance: 1,500; Referees: Ivanović, Vujisić (MNE)

7 February 2023; 18:45	Füchse Berlin (Germany)	32–24	(Ukraine) HC Motor	Max-Schmeling-Halle, Berlin; Attendance: 4,595; Referees: Bethmann, Tzaferopoulos (GRE)
7 February 2023; 18:45	Holm 11	(18–10)	Turchenko 12	Max-Schmeling-Halle, Berlin; Attendance: 4,595; Referees: Bethmann, Tzaferopoulos (GRE)
7 February 2023; 18:45	1× (yellow card) 3× (suspension)	Report	3× (yellow card) 7× (suspension)	Max-Schmeling-Halle, Berlin; Attendance: 4,595; Referees: Bethmann, Tzaferopoulos (GRE)

7 February 2023; 18:45	Skanderborg-Aarhus (Denmark)	24–22	(North Macedonia) Eurofarm Pelister	Skanderborg Fælled, Skanderborg; Attendance: 1,073; Referees: Kull, Tint (EST)
7 February 2023; 18:45	Balling Christensen 7	(11–11)	Peševski, Radović 4	Skanderborg Fælled, Skanderborg; Attendance: 1,073; Referees: Kull, Tint (EST)
7 February 2023; 18:45	1× (yellow card) 3× (suspension)	Report	1× (yellow card) 1× (suspension) 1× (red card)	Skanderborg Fælled, Skanderborg; Attendance: 1,073; Referees: Kull, Tint (EST)

7 February 2023; 20:45	Águas Santas Milaneza (Portugal)	28–25	(Spain) Bidasoa Irun	Pavilhão Municipal da Póvoa de Varzim, Póvoa de Varzim; Attendance: 200; Referees: Horváth, Marton (HUN)
7 February 2023; 20:45	three players 6	(14–14)	Cavero, García Rivera 4	Pavilhão Municipal da Póvoa de Varzim, Póvoa de Varzim; Attendance: 200; Referees: Horváth, Marton (HUN)
7 February 2023; 20:45	2× (yellow card) 5× (suspension)	Report	5× (suspension)	Pavilhão Municipal da Póvoa de Varzim, Póvoa de Varzim; Attendance: 200; Referees: Horváth, Marton (HUN)

14 February 2023; 18:45	Skanderborg-Aarhus (Denmark)	33–30	(Ukraine) HC Motor	Skanderborg Fælled, Skanderborg; Attendance: 1,522; Referees: Gasmi, Gasmi (FRA)
14 February 2023; 18:45	Jensen 8	(15–15)	Horiha, Turchenko 8	Skanderborg Fælled, Skanderborg; Attendance: 1,522; Referees: Gasmi, Gasmi (FRA)
14 February 2023; 18:45	2× (suspension)	Report	1× (suspension)	Skanderborg Fælled, Skanderborg; Attendance: 1,522; Referees: Gasmi, Gasmi (FRA)

14 February 2023; 20:45	Bidasoa Irun (Spain)	32–40	(Germany) Füchse Berlin	Polideportivo Artaleku, Irun; Attendance: 1,786; Referees: Erdoğan, Özdeniz (TUR)
14 February 2023; 20:45	Cortés 7	(17–23)	Vujović 7	Polideportivo Artaleku, Irun; Attendance: 1,786; Referees: Erdoğan, Özdeniz (TUR)
14 February 2023; 20:45	2× (suspension)	Report	2× (yellow card) 3× (suspension)	Polideportivo Artaleku, Irun; Attendance: 1,786; Referees: Erdoğan, Özdeniz (TUR)

14 February 2023; 20:45	Eurofarm Pelister (North Macedonia)	27–27	(Portugal) Águas Santas Milaneza	Boro Čurlevski Sports Hall, Bitola; Attendance: 2,015; Referees: Jurinović, Mrvica (CRO)
14 February 2023; 20:45	Radović 5	(14–13)	Oliveira 7	Boro Čurlevski Sports Hall, Bitola; Attendance: 2,015; Referees: Jurinović, Mrvica (CRO)
14 February 2023; 20:45	3× (suspension) 1× (red card)	Report	4× (suspension)	Boro Čurlevski Sports Hall, Bitola; Attendance: 2,015; Referees: Jurinović, Mrvica (CRO)

21 February 2023; 18:45	HC Motor (Ukraine)	33–31	(Spain) Bidasoa Irun	Castello Düsseldorf, Düsseldorf, Germany; Attendance: 400; Referees: Leszczyński, Piechota (POL)
21 February 2023; 18:45	Turchenko 13	(16–16)	Cavero 9	Castello Düsseldorf, Düsseldorf, Germany; Attendance: 400; Referees: Leszczyński, Piechota (POL)
21 February 2023; 18:45	5× (suspension)	Report	3× (suspension)	Castello Düsseldorf, Düsseldorf, Germany; Attendance: 400; Referees: Leszczyński, Piechota (POL)

21 February 2023; 20:45	Skanderborg-Aarhus (Denmark)	33–26	(Portugal) Águas Santas Milaneza	Skanderborg Fælled, Skanderborg; Attendance: 510; Referees: Andorka, Hucker (HUN)
21 February 2023; 20:45	Mollerup 10	(16–11)	Furtado 5	Skanderborg Fælled, Skanderborg; Attendance: 510; Referees: Andorka, Hucker (HUN)
21 February 2023; 20:45	1× (yellow card) 4× (suspension)	Report	1× (yellow card) 2× (suspension)	Skanderborg Fælled, Skanderborg; Attendance: 510; Referees: Andorka, Hucker (HUN)

21 February 2023; 20:45	Füchse Berlin (Germany)	34–25	(North Macedonia) Eurofarm Pelister	Max-Schmeling-Halle, Berlin; Attendance: 4,517; Referees: Carmaux, Mursch (FRA)
21 February 2023; 20:45	Gidsel 6	(18–12)	three players 5	Max-Schmeling-Halle, Berlin; Attendance: 4,517; Referees: Carmaux, Mursch (FRA)
21 February 2023; 20:45	4× (suspension)	Report	1× (yellow card) 4× (suspension)	Max-Schmeling-Halle, Berlin; Attendance: 4,517; Referees: Carmaux, Mursch (FRA)

28 February 2023; 20:45	Eurofarm Pelister (North Macedonia)	25–27	(Ukraine) HC Motor	Boro Čurlevski Sports Hall, Bitola; Attendance: 2,850; Referees: Jović, Arnautović (BIH)
28 February 2023; 20:45	Tankoski 9	(13–15)	Turchenko 7	Boro Čurlevski Sports Hall, Bitola; Attendance: 2,850; Referees: Jović, Arnautović (BIH)
28 February 2023; 20:45	1× (suspension)	Report	3× (yellow card) 2× (suspension)	Boro Čurlevski Sports Hall, Bitola; Attendance: 2,850; Referees: Jović, Arnautović (BIH)

28 February 2023; 20:45	Bidasoa Irun (Spain)	29–26	(Denmark) Skanderborg-Aarhus	Polideportivo Artaleku, Irun; Attendance: 1,226; Referees: Mandák, Rudinský (SVK)
28 February 2023; 20:45	Aguinagalde 6	(16–12)	Mollerup 5	Polideportivo Artaleku, Irun; Attendance: 1,226; Referees: Mandák, Rudinský (SVK)
28 February 2023; 20:45	1× (yellow card) 2× (suspension)	Report	1× (yellow card) 3× (suspension) 1× (red card)	Polideportivo Artaleku, Irun; Attendance: 1,226; Referees: Mandák, Rudinský (SVK)

28 February 2023; 20:45	Águas Santas Milaneza (Portugal)	23–29	(Germany) Füchse Berlin	Pavilhão Municipal da Póvoa de Varzim, Póvoa de Varzim; Attendance: 400; Referees: Bogdanovs, Cernavskis (LAT)
28 February 2023; 20:45	Furtado 4	(10–17)	Vujović, Wiede 5	Pavilhão Municipal da Póvoa de Varzim, Póvoa de Varzim; Attendance: 400; Referees: Bogdanovs, Cernavskis (LAT)
28 February 2023; 20:45	2× (suspension)	Report	1× (suspension)	Pavilhão Municipal da Póvoa de Varzim, Póvoa de Varzim; Attendance: 400; Referees: Bogdanovs, Cernavskis (LAT)
