= 2021–22 Handball-Bundesliga =

Handball-Bundesliga
- Season: 2021–22
- Dates: 8 September 2021 – 12 June 2022
- Champions: SC Magdeburg; 2nd title
- Relegated: HBW Balingen-Weilstetten; TuS Nettelstedt-Lübbecke
- Champions League: SC Magdeburg; THW Kiel
- European League: Füchse Berlin; SG Flensburg-Handewitt; Frisch Auf Göppingen
- Matches: 306
- Goals: 16,725 (54.66 per match)
- Top goalscorer: Hans Lindberg (242 goals)
- Attendance: 953,728 (3,117 per match) (Note: Due to the COVID-19 pandemic in Germany, each local health department allows a different number of spectators.)

The 2021–22 Handball-Bundesliga (known as the Liqui Moly Handball-Bundesliga for sponsorship reasons) was the 57th season of the Handball-Bundesliga, Germany's premier handball league and the 45th season consisting of only one league. It ran from 8 September 2021 to 12 June 2022.

SC Magdeburg won their second title.

== Teams ==
Locations of the 2020–21 Handball-Bundesliga teams

=== Team changes ===
Promoted from 2020–21 2. Handball-Bundesliga	Relegated from 2020–21 Handball-Bundesliga
TuS Nettelstedt-Lübbecke; HSV Hamburg	Die Eulen Ludwigshafen; HSG Nordhorn-Lingen; TUSEM Essen; HSC 2000 Coburg

=== Arenas and locations ===
The following 18 clubs competed in the Handball-Bundesliga during the 2021–22 season:

Team	Location	Arena	Capacity
HBW Balingen-Weilstetten	Balingen	Sparkassen-Arena; Porsche-Arena	2,300; 6,181
Bergischer HC	Wuppertal; Solingen; Düsseldorf	Uni-Halle; Klingenhalle; PSD Bank Dome	3,200; 2,800; 12,500
Füchse Berlin	Berlin	Max-Schmeling-Halle	9,000
TVB 1898 Stuttgart	Stuttgart	Scharrena Stuttgart; Porsche-Arena	2,251; 6,211
HC Erlangen	Nuremberg	Arena Nürnberger Versicherung	8,308
SG Flensburg-Handewitt	Flensburg	Flens-Arena	6,300
Frisch Auf Göppingen	Göppingen	EWS Arena	5,600
HSV Hamburg	Hamburg	Alsterdorfer Sporthalle	7,000
TSV Hannover-Burgdorf	Hanover	ZAG-Arena; Swiss Life Hall	9,850; 4,460
THW Kiel	Kiel	Wunderino Arena	10,285
SC DHfK Leipzig	Leipzig	Quarterback Immobilien Arena	6,327
TBV Lemgo	Lemgo	Phoenix Contact Arena	4,790
TuS Nettelstedt-Lübbecke	Lübbecke	Merkur Arena	3,300
SC Magdeburg	Magdeburg	GETEC Arena	6,600
MT Melsungen	Kassel	Rothenbach-Halle	4,300
GWD Minden	Minden	Kampa-Halle	4,059
Rhein-Neckar Löwen	Mannheim	SAP Arena	13,200
HSG Wetzlar	Wetzlar	Rittal Arena Wetzlar	4,421

== League table ==
Pos	Team	Pld	W	D	L	GF	GA	GD	Pts	Qualification or relegation
1	SC Magdeburg (C)	34	32	0	2	1067	884	+183	64	Qualification for Champions League group phase
2	THW Kiel	34	28	2	4	1045	870	+175	58	Qualification for Champions League group phase
3	Füchse Berlin	34	24	5	5	1006	885	+121	53	Qualification for European League group phase
4	SG Flensburg-Handewitt	34	22	6	6	978	852	+126	50	Qualification for European League second qualifying round
5	Frisch Auf Göppingen	34	17	4	13	975	987	−12	38	Qualification for European League second qualifying round
6	TBV Lemgo	34	16	5	13	945	962	−17	37	Qualification for European League first qualifying round (Note: Since the winners of the 2021–22 DHB-Pokal, THW Kiel, qualified for the Champions League based on league position, the Europa League spot was passed to the sixth-placed team.)
7	HSG Wetzlar	34	16	3	15	932	910	+22	35	
8	MT Melsungen	34	15	3	16	890	892	−2	33	
9	SC DHfK Leipzig	34	14	5	15	891	893	−2	33	
10	Rhein-Neckar Löwen	34	13	4	17	960	965	−5	30	
11	Bergischer HC	34	13	3	18	851	885	−34	29	
12	HC Erlangen	34	12	3	19	911	936	−25	27	
13	TSV Hannover-Burgdorf	34	12	3	19	900	942	−42	27	
14	HSV Hamburg	34	12	2	20	919	960	−41	26	
15	TVB 1898 Stuttgart	34	11	2	21	962	1032	−70	24	
16	GWD Minden	34	7	4	23	857	950	−93	18	
17	HBW Balingen-Weilstetten (R)	34	6	4	24	847	987	−140	16	Relegated to 2. Handball-Bundesliga
18	TuS Nettelstedt-Lübbecke (R)	34	7	0	27	789	933	−144	14	Relegated to 2. Handball-Bundesliga

Source: DKB
Rules for classification: 1) points; 2) goal difference; 3) goals scored; 4) head-to-head points; 5) head-to-head goal difference; 6) head-to-head number of goals scored.
(C) Champions; (R) Relegated

== Results ==
Home \ Away	BAL	BRG	BER	BIT	ERL	FLE	GÖP	HAM	HAN	KIE	LEI	LEM	LÜB	MAG	MEL	MIN	RNL	WET
HBW Balingen-Weilstetten	—	30–28	23–23	25–28	23–25	23–23	26–30	23–28	28–26	25–31	25–29	29–32	26–21	17–28	25–34	27–21	22–31	24–28
Bergischer HC	29–21	—	23–28	26–25	25–25	24–29	33–27	31–26	25–23	24–26	30–20	32–27	26–22	24–27	24–31	25–26	25–25	17–27
Füchse Berlin	26–26	32–17	—	29–22	35–30	22–28	37–31	34–30	32–32	28–28	34–25	29–24	30–22	29–33	28–29	35–25	23–20	29–24
TVB 1898 Stuttgart	27–26	27–26	32–32	—	34–29	26–28	27–34	26–34	22–34	29–42	29–25	37–40	29–31	27–30	28–25	35–31	35–30	26–26
HC Erlangen	33–26	30–23	25–31	27–32	—	26–30	23–25	23–22	31–35	20–30	19–15	24–28	29–22	36–38	32–31	30–22	36–26	24–27
SG Flensburg-Handewitt	35–21	21–24	28–23	30–29	27–27	—	26–21	33–23	30–20	27–28	31–21	27–19	30–19	30–27	27–24	31–31	31–26	27–25
Frisch Auf Göppingen	27–28	27–24	24–31	34–32	34–25	30–30	—	24–28	31–25	26–38	29–28	33–33	27–24	24–25	26–26	33–22	30–28	33–26
HSV Hamburg	29–34	26–27	27–30	27–32	30–29	27–33	27–28	—	25–23	23–32	24–33	28–28	32–24	22–32	26–25	31–27	32–27	31–23
TSV Hannover-Burgdorf	31–27	28–20	22–25	33–23	28–27	26–31	32–34	29–27	—	26–29	26–26	27–31	22–21	27–31	23–25	30–29	24–28	22–28
THW Kiel	33–24	24–23	27–31	35–31	34–24	33–23	42–35	29–22	31–24	—	32–28	32–19	32–23	27–29	27–25	34–25	32–29	27–24
SC DHfK Leipzig	31–24	22–26	25–30	33–24	24–16	25–24	29–20	27–27	32–25	20–31	—	29–25	25–21	31–36	22–26	25–26	28–31	30–26
TBV Lemgo	38–28	27–27	27–28	33–30	27–33	30–25	34–26	28–23	31–33	21–21	26–27	—	27–22	25–44	26–26	20–32	24–23	29–27
TuS Nettelstedt-Lübbecke	33–27	20–24	26–32	27–23	20–21	17–34	22–27	29–27	21–10	29–25	23–28	26–28	—	20–30	23–31	19–21	22–29	25–28
SC Magdeburg	31–26	38–25	28–27	33–29	28–27	33–28	37–26	34–26	30–22	25–30	30–28	29–25	38–20	—	33–26	28–19	37–34	30–26
MT Melsungen	28–21	26–24	25–33	29–23	30–28	26–32	24–26	26–22	22–29	26–33	22–22	18–23	23–22	24–27	—	25–29	25–24	27–22
GWD Minden	23–23	25–21	25–31	25–26	22–21	18–31	30–33	23–27	26–26	27–30	23–23	29–32	18–23	26–31	22–26	—	31–33	23–24
Rhein-Neckar Löwen	34–23	24–22	24–29	28–23	26–26	29–29	37–32	28–34	25–31	26–33	28–28	30–33	35–25	25–28	29–27	31–27	—	27–30
HSG Wetzlar	33–21	23–27	28–30	35–34	26–30	29–29	28–28	26–25	38–16	29–27	24–27	27–25	29–25	26–29	31–28	30–28	29–30	—

Source: DKB
Legend: Blue = home team win; Yellow = draw; Red = away team win.

== Top goalscorers ==
Rank	Player	Club	Goals	Shots	%
1	(Denmark) Hans Lindberg	Füchse Berlin	242	288	84
2	(Iceland) Ómar Ingi Magnússon	SC Magdeburg	237	339	70
3	(Iceland) Bjarki Már Elísson	TBV Lemgo	234	319	73
4	(Denmark) Casper Ulrich Mortensen	HSV Hamburg	206	288	72
5	(Sweden) Niclas Ekberg	THW Kiel	189	245	77
6	(Germany) Marcel Schiller	Frisch Auf Göppingen	186	259	72
7	(Montenegro) Vladan Lipovina	HBW Balingen-Weilstetten	177	345	51
8	(Sweden) Simon Jeppsson	HC Erlangen	176	302	58
9	(Germany) Tom Skroblien	TuS Nettelstedt-Lübbecke	172	251	69
10	(Denmark) Jóhan Hansen	TSV Hannover-Burgdorf	162	250	65

== See also ==
- 2021–22 DHB-Pokal
- 2021–22 2. Handball-Bundesliga
