= 2022–23 EHF European League =

European handball tournament

EHF European League
- 2022–23

Tournament information
- Sport: Handball
- Dates: 27 August 2022–28 May 2023
- Teams: 44 (qualification stage); 24 (group stage)
- Website: ehfel.com

Final positions
- Champions: (Germany) Füchse Berlin
- Runner-up: (Spain) Fraikin BM Granollers

Tournament statistics
- MVP: (Germany) Fabian Wiede
- Top scorer(s): (Iceland) Óðinn Þór Ríkharðsson (110 goals)

The 2022–23 EHF European League was the 42nd season of Europe's secondary club handball tournament organised by European Handball Federation (EHF), and the 3rd season since it was renamed from the EHF Cup to the EHF European League.

Füchse Berlin became champions, having defeated Fraikin BM Granollers in the final.

== Qualified teams ==
The full list of teams qualified for each stage of the 2022–23 EHF European League was announced on 12 July 2022.

The labels in the parentheses show how each team qualified for the place of its starting round:

- EL: European League title holders
- CW: Cup winners
- CR: Cup runners-up
- 4th, 5th, etc.: League position of the previous season
  - SF: Semi-final league position
  - QF: Quarter-final league position

Group stage
(Portugal) SL Benfica (3rd)^{EL}	(Germany) Füchse Berlin (3rd)	(France) PAUC Handball (3rd)	(Denmark) Skjern Håndbold (4th)
(Sweden) Ystads IF (1st)	(Switzerland) Kadetten Schaffhausen (1st)	(Spain) Fraikin BM Granollers (2nd)	(North Macedonia) Eurofarm Pelister (2nd)
(Hungary) Balatonfüredi KSE (3rd)	(Slovakia) Tatran Prešov (1st)	(Ukraine) HC Motor (1st)	(Iceland) Valur (1st)

Qualification round 2
(Germany) SG Flensburg-Handewitt (4th)	(Spain) Bidasoa Irun (3rd)	(Germany) Frisch Auf Göppingen (5th)	(Portugal) Sporting CP (2nd)
(France) Montpellier HB (4th)	(Poland) KS Azoty-Puławy (3rd)	(Denmark) Skanderborg-Aarhus (5th)	(Spain) BM Benidorm (4th)
(North Macedonia) Butel Skopje (3rd)	(Hungary) Fejér B.Á.L. Veszprém (CR)	(Romania) CSA Steaua București (CR)	(Portugal) Belenenses (4th)
(Poland) MMTS Kwidzyn (4th)	(Croatia) RK Nexe (2nd)		

Qualification round 1
(Sweden) IK Sävehof (CW)	(Switzerland) GC Amicitia Zürich (CW)	(Spain) Rebi Balonmano Cuenca (5th)	(Slovenia) RK Trimo Trebnje (2nd)
(North Macedonia) Eurofarm Pelister 2 (5th)	(Romania) Minaur Baia Mare (2nd)	(Norway) Drammen HK (SF)	(Portugal) Águas Santas Milaneza (5th)
(Romania) Dobrogea Sud (3rd)	(Germany) TBV Lemgo Lippe (6th)	(France) Chambery Savoie MB HB (5th)	(Poland) Górnik Zabrze (5th)
(Denmark) Bjerrinbro-Silkeborg (3rd)	(Spain) Logroño La Rioja (6th)	(Hungary) FTC (4th)	(Romania) Potaissa Turda (4th)
(Sweden) IFK Kristianstad (SF)	(Austria) Alpla HC Hard (1st)	(Norway) Kolstad Håndball (QF)	(Finland) HC Cocks (1st)

== Qualifying rounds ==
=== First qualifying round ===
A total of 20 teams were involved in the first qualifying round. The first leg matches were held on 27–28 August 2022, while the second leg matches were held on 3–4 September 2022. The draw was held in EHF office in Vienna.

The results of this round were:

Team 1	Agg.	Team 2	1st leg	2nd leg
Rebi Balonmano Cuenca (Spain)	48–64	(Denmark) Bjerrinbro-Silkeborg	26–31	22–33
Chambery Savoie MB HB (France)	49–46	(Romania) HC Dobrogea Sud Constanța	27–23	22–23
CS Minaur Baia Mare (Romania)	49–74	(Hungary) FTC	27–36	22–38
HC Cocks (Finland)	42–51	(Portugal) Águas Santas Milaneza	22–21	20–30
IK Sävehof (Sweden)	79–51	(Romania) AHC Potaissa Turda	45–21	34–30
Górnik Zabrze (Poland)	50–51	(Switzerland) GC Amicitia Zürich	27–19	23–32
Alpla HC Hard (Austria)	51–45	(North Macedonia) HC Eurofarm Pelister 2	24–21	27–24
Kolstad Håndball (Norway)	57–47	(Norway) Drammen HK	28–26	29–21
IFK Kristianstad (Sweden)	69–64	(Slovenia) RK Trimo Trebnje	33–33	36–31
TBV Lemgo Lippe (Germany)	67–62	(Spain) BM Logroño La Rioja	39–34	28–28

=== Second qualifying round ===
A total of 24 teams were involved in the second qualifying round, 10 teams advancing from the previous round and 14 teams entering this round. The first leg matches were held on 27 September 2022, while the second leg matches were held on 4 October 2022. The draw was held in EHF office in Vienna.

Team 1	Agg.	Team 2	1st leg	2nd leg
Chambery Savoie MB HB (France)	54–56	(Hungary) Fejér B.Á.L. Veszprém	29–25	25–31
IK Sävehof (Sweden)	50–54	(France) Montpellier HB	24–24	26–30
KS Azoty-Puławy (Poland)	59–61	(Croatia) RK Nexe	32–26	27–35
Frisch Auf Göppingen (Germany)	59–57	(Germany) TBV Lemgo Lippe	28–24	31–33
Alpla HC Hard (Austria)	51–42	(North Macedonia) HC Butel Skopje	26–21	25–21
IFK Kristianstad (Sweden)	64–67	(Denmark) Skanderborg-Aarhus	31–32	33–35
CSA Steaua București (Romania)	64–66	(Hungary) FTC	33–31	31–35
Beleneses (Portugal)	42–57	(Portugal) Águas Santas Milaneza	20–23	22–34
Bidasoa Irun (Spain)	61–60	(Norway) Kolstad Håndball	30–27	31–33
BM Benidorm (Spain)	64–58	(Switzerland) GC Amicitia Zürich	34–24	30–34
Sporting CP (Portugal)	61–55	(Denmark) Bjerringbro-Silkeborg	31–22	30–33
MMTS Kwidzyn (Poland)	49–76	(Germany) SG Flensburg-Handewitt	25–39	24–37

== Group stage ==
Location of teams of the 2022–23 EHF European League group stage.
Red: Group A; Blue: Group B; Yellow: Group C; Green: Group D.

The 24 teams were divided into six pots of four teams, with a team from each pot being drawn to each group. Teams from the same country could not be drawn into the same group. The draw was held in EHF office in Vienna.

A total of 14 national associations were represented in the group stage.

=== Group A ===
Pos	Team	Pld	W	D	L	GF	GA	GD	Pts	Qualification	MON	GÖP	KAD	BEN	PRE	VES
1	(France) Montpellier HB	10	8	0	2	330	295	+35	16 (Note: Montpellier 60–54 Göppingen)	Knockout stage	—	35–27	40–36	33–27	41–30	34–30
2	(Germany) Frisch Auf Göppingen	10	8	0	2	323	274	+49	16	Knockout stage	27–25	—	24–25	31–29	34–24	46–30
3	(Switzerland) Kadetten Schaffhausen	10	7	0	3	319	299	+20	14	Knockout stage	28–30	30–35	—	26–25	38–30	38–32
4	(Portugal) SL Benfica	10	4	0	6	297	289	+8	8	Knockout stage	24–26	27–31	27–28	—	35–28	39–35
5	(Slovakia) Tatran Prešov	10	2	0	8	279	319	−40	4		35–27	26–28	31–37	25–29	—	22–20
6	(Hungary) Fejér B.Á.L. Veszprém	10	1	0	9	282	354	−72	2		31–39	23–40	25–33	26–35	30–28	—

Source: EHF
Rules for classification: Tiebreakers

=== Group B ===
Pos	Team	Pld	W	D	L	GF	GA	GD	Pts	Qualification	FLE	YST	VAL	FTC	PAU	BEN
1	(Germany) SG Flensburg-Handewitt	10	8	1	1	327	280	+47	17	Knockout stage	—	30–23	33–30	42–30	30–25	35–30
2	(Sweden) Ystads IF	10	5	1	4	317	316	+1	11 (Note: Ystad 65–64 Valur)	Knockout stage	30–26	—	33–35	35–35	29–33	36–30
3	(Iceland) Valur	10	5	1	4	338	328	+10	11	Knockout stage	32–37	29–32	—	43–39	40–31	35–29
4	(Hungary) FTC	10	3	3	4	318	328	−10	9	Knockout stage	27–27	37–34	33–33	—	28–25	32–33
5	(France) PAUC Handball	10	4	0	6	305	313	−8	8		21–29	34–36	32–29	33–30	—	39–29
6	(Spain) BM Benidorm	10	2	0	8	295	335	−40	4		32–38	27–29	29–32	23–27	33–32	—

Source: EHF
Rules for classification: Tiebreakers

=== Group C ===
Pos	Team	Pld	W	D	L	GF	GA	GD	Pts	Qualification	NEX	SPO	GRA	SKJ	ALP	BAL
1	(Croatia) RK Nexe	10	8	0	2	311	281	+30	16	Knockout stage	—	32–31	39–36	29–28	22–29	37–23
2	(Portugal) Sporting CP	10	7	0	3	312	294	+18	14	Knockout stage	28–34	—	38–31	28–24	31–30	35–32
3	(Spain) Fraikin BM Granollers	10	6	1	3	315	301	+14	13	Knockout stage	25–22	32–29	—	34–31	38–28	33–30
4	(Denmark) Skjern Håndbold	10	5	0	5	294	284	+10	10	Knockout stage	29–30	28–30	32–29	—	27–23	32–26
5	(Austria) Alpla HC Hard	10	1	2	7	270	300	−30	4		24–35	26–31	27–27	27–32	—	30–30
6	(Hungary) Balatonfüredi KSE	10	1	1	8	274	316	−42	3		28–31	25–31	25–30	28–31	27–26	—

Source: EHF
Rules for classification: Tiebreakers

=== Group D ===
Pos	Team	Pld	W	D	L	GF	GA	GD	Pts	Qualification	BER	SKA	BID	MOT	EUR	AGU
1	(Germany) Füchse Berlin	10	10	0	0	343	266	+77	20	Knockout stage	—	30–24	34–29	32–24	34–25	34–20
2	(Denmark) Skanderborg-Aarhus	10	7	0	3	307	276	+31	14	Knockout stage	28–29	—	38–27	33–30	24–22	33–26
3	(Spain) Bidasoa Irun	10	4	1	5	295	296	−1	9	Knockout stage	32–40	29–26	—	26–22	32–20	35–26
4	(Ukraine) HC Motor	10	3	1	6	280	305	−25	7	Knockout stage	27–38	31–37	33–31	—	30–33	30–24
5	(North Macedonia) Eurofarm Pelister	10	2	2	6	271	303	−32	6		34–43	27–30	29–29	25–27	—	27–27
6	(Portugal) Águas Santas Milaneza	10	1	2	7	252	302	−50	4		23–29	25–34	28–25	26–26	27–29	—

Source: EHF
Rules for classification: Tiebreakers

== Knockout stage ==
=== Pairings ===
The pairings for the last 16 and the quarterfinals are based on group stage standings, according to the following bracket. This assures teams from the same group can only play each other again in the final four.

Last 16
21 March/28 March
3D (Spain) Bidasoa Irun	30	28	58
2C (Portugal) Sporting CP	27	34	61
21 March/28 March
4B (Hungary) FTC	30	29	59
1A (France) Montpellier HB	36	43	79
21 March/28 March
3C (Spain) Fraikin BM Granollers	32	30	62
2D (Denmark) Skanderborg-Aarhus	34	25	59
21 March/28 March
4A (Portugal) SL Benfica	26	28	54
1B (Germany) SG Flensburg-Handewitt	39	33	72
21 March/28 March
3B (Iceland) Valur	29	31	60
2A (Germany) Frisch Auf Göppingen	36	33	69
21 March/28 March
4D (Ukraine) HC Motor	23	29	52
1C (Croatia) RK Nexe	27	27	54
21 March/28 March
3A (Switzerland) Kadetten Schaffhausen	38	27	65
2B (Sweden) Ystads IF	32	25	57
21 March/28 March
4C (Denmark) Skjern Håndbold	23	32	55
1D (Germany) Füchse Berlin	28	38	66

Quarterfinals
11 April/18 April
(Portugal) Sporting CP	32	30	62
(France) Montpellier HB	32	31	63
11 April/18 April
(Spain) Fraikin BM Granollers	30	35	65
(Germany) SG Flensburg-Handewitt	31	27	58
11 April/18 April
(Germany) Frisch Auf Göppingen	32	31	63
(Croatia) RK Nexe	23	27	50
11 April/18 April
(Switzerland) Kadetten Schaffhausen	37	24	61
(Germany) Füchse Berlin	33	30	63

=== Last 16 ===
The last 16 first legs were played 21 March 2023, while the second legs followed on 28 March 2023.

Team 1	Agg.	Team 2	1st leg	2nd leg
Bidasoa Irun (Spain)	58–61	(Portugal) Sporting CP	30–27	28–34
FTC (Hungary)	59–79	(France) Montpellier HB	30–36	29–43
Fraikin BM Granollers (Spain)	62–59	(Denmark) Skanderborg-Aarhus	32–34	30–25
SL Benfica (Portugal)	54–72	(Germany) SG Flensburg-Handewitt	26–39	28–33
Valur (Iceland)	60–69	(Germany) Frisch Auf Göppingen	29–36	31–33
HC Motor (Ukraine)	52–54	(Croatia) RK Nexe	23–27	29–27
Kadetten Schaffhausen (Switzerland)	65–57	(Sweden) Ystads IF	38–32	27–25
Skjern Håndbold (Denmark)	55–66	(Germany) Füchse Berlin	23–28	32–38

=== Quarterfinals ===
The quarterfinals first legs were played 11 April 2023, while the second legs followed on 18 April 2023.

Team 1	Agg.	Team 2	1st leg	2nd leg
Sporting CP (Portugal)	62–63	(France) Montpellier HB	32–32	30–31
Fraikin BM Granollers (Spain)	65–58	(Germany) SG Flensburg-Handewitt	30–31	35–27
Frisch Auf Göppingen (Germany)	63–50	(Croatia) RK Nexe	32–23	31–27
Kadetten Schaffhausen (Switzerland)	61–63	(Germany) Füchse Berlin	37–33	24–30

=== Final four ===
==== Bracket ====
Semifinals
27 May
(France) Montpellier HB	29
(Germany) Füchse Berlin	35
27 May
(Spain) Fraikin BM Granollers	31
(Germany) Frisch Auf Göppingen	29

Final
28 May
(Germany) Füchse Berlin	36
(Spain) Fraikin BM Granollers	31
Third place
28 May
(France) Montpellier HB	29
(Germany) Frisch Auf Göppingen	33

==== Final ====
28 May 2023; 18:00	Füchse Berlin (Germany)	36–31	(Spain) Fraikin BM Granollers	Campushalle, Flensburg; Attendance: 4,300; Referees: Madsen, Mortensen (DEN)
28 May 2023; 18:00	Andersson 8	(16–12)	García Robledo, Salinas 7	Campushalle, Flensburg; Attendance: 4,300; Referees: Madsen, Mortensen (DEN)
28 May 2023; 18:00	2× (yellow card) 2× (suspension)	Report	2× (yellow card) 4× (suspension)	Campushalle, Flensburg; Attendance: 4,300; Referees: Madsen, Mortensen (DEN)

== Top goalscorers ==
Rank	Player	Club	Goals
1	(Iceland) Óðinn Þór Ríkharðsson	(Switzerland) Kadetten Schaffhausen	110
2	(Portugal) Martim Costa	(Portugal) Sporting CP	102
3	(Hungary) Bence Nagy	(Hungary) FTC	99
4	(Ukraine) Ihor Turchenko	(Ukraine) HC Motor	97
5	(Portugal) Francisco Costa	(Portugal) Sporting CP	95
6	(Spain) Antonio García Robledo	(Spain) Fraikin BM Granollers	94
7	(Germany) Marcel Schiller	(Germany) Frisch Auf Göppingen	78
8	(Montenegro) Miloš Vujović	(Germany) Füchse Berlin	76
9	(Denmark) Emil Jakobsen	(Germany) SG Flensburg-Handewitt	75
9	(Croatia) Josip Šarac	(Germany) Frisch Auf Göppingen	75
9	(France) Kyllian Villeminot	(France) Montpellier HB	75
