= 2021–22 Macedonian Handball Super League =

Macedonian Super League
- Season: 2021–22
- Dates: 12 September 2021 – 3 June 2022
- Champion: Vardar 1961; 15th title
- Relegated: Metalurg
- European League: Eurofarm Pelister; Butel Skopje; Eurofarm Pelister 2

The 2021–22 Macedonian Handball Super League was the 30th season of the Super League, North Macedonia's premier handball league. It ram from 12 September 2021 to 3 June 2022.

Vardar won their fifteenth title.

== Teams ==
Locations of the 2021–22 Macedonian Super League

=== Arenas and locations ===
The following 12 clubs compete in the Super League during the 2021–22 season:

Team	Location	Arena	Capacity
Butel	Skopje, Butel	Sala Butel	1,000
Metalurg	Skopje	Avtokomanda; Boris Trajkovski Arena	2,000; 6,500
Ohrid	Ohrid	Biljanini Izvori Sports Hall	3,000
Eurofarm Pelister	Bitola	Boro Čurlevski Sports Hall	3,700
Eurofarm Pelister 2	Bitola	Boro Čurlevski Sports Hall	3,700
Prilep	Prilep	Riste Risteski- Ricko	200
Prolet 62	Skopje, Prolet	Makedonsko Sonce Arena	1,200
Radoviš	Radoviš	SRC 25ti Maj	2,500
Skopje 2020	Skopje		
Struga	Struga	Sala Struga	1,200
Tikveš 2014	Tikveš	Jasmin Sports Hall	2,500
Vardar 1961	Skopje	Jane Sandanski Arena	6,000

Clubs that play in the 2021–22 SEHA League

== Regular season ==
=== League table ===
Pos	Team	Pld	W	D	L	GF	GA	GD	Pts	Qualification or relegation
1	Eurofarm Pelister	22	20	1	1	695	463	+232	61	Qualification to Championship round
2	Vardar 1961	22	20	1	1	733	523	+210	61	Qualification to Championship round
3	Eurofarm Pelister 2	22	14	2	6	629	589	+40	44	Qualification to Championship round
4	Butel Skopje	22	14	1	7	521	490	+31	43	Qualification to Championship round
5	Tikveš 2014	22	13	1	8	590	573	+17	40	Qualification to Championship round
6	Ohrid	22	12	1	9	570	513	+57	37	Qualification to Championship round
7	Prolet 62	22	10	2	10	576	593	−17	32	Qualification to Relegation round
8	Struga	22	6	1	15	534	617	−83	19	Qualification to Relegation round
9	Prilep	22	6	0	16	564	665	−101	18	Qualification to Relegation round
10	Metalurg	22	7	0	15	425	505	−80	15 (Note: Metalurg were deducted six point for due to a federational decision.)	Qualification to Relegation round
11	Skopje 2020	22	3	0	19	518	678	−160	9	Qualification to Relegation round
12	Radoviš	22	2	0	20	494	647	−153	6	Qualification to Relegation round

Source: Macedonian Handball Federation - Суперлига Мажи (2021/2022) (in Macedonian), Flashscore
Rules for classification: 1) points; 2) goal difference; 3) head-to-head points; 4) goals scored; 5) head-to-head goal difference; 6) head-to-head number of goals scored.

== Second round ==
=== Championship round ===
Pos	Team	Pld	W	D	L	GF	GA	GD	Pts	Qualification
1	Vardar 1961 (C)	10	9	0	1	284	229	+55	32 (Note: Vardar were added five points due to a federational decision.)	Excluded from European competitions (Note: Vardar 1961 failed to get the EHF license for the competition due to financial issues.)
2	Eurofarm Pelister	10	9	0	1	287	228	+59	31 (Note: Eurofarm Pelister were added four points due to a federational decision.)	Qualification for European League group phase
3	Butel Skopje	10	5	1	4	247	262	−15	18 (Note: Butel Skopje were added two points due to a federational decision.)	Qualification for European League second qualifying round
4	Tikveš 2014	10	2	2	6	268	291	−23	9 (Note: Tikveš 2014 were added one point due to a federational decision.)	
5	Eurofarm Pelister 2	10	1	3	6	242	286	−44	9 (Note: Eurofarm Pelister 2 were added three points due to a federational decision.)	Qualification for European League first qualifying round
6	Ohrid	10	0	2	8	226	258	−32	2	

Source: Macedonian Handball Federation - Супер Лига Мажи – Плеј Оф (2021/2022) (in Macedonian), Flashscore
Rules for classification: 1) points; 2) goal difference; 3) head-to-head points; 4) goals scored; 5) head-to-head goal difference; 6) head-to-head number of goals scored.
(C) Champions

=== Relegation round ===
Pos	Team	Pld	W	D	L	GF	GA	GD	Pts	Qualification or relegation
7	Prolet 62	16	8	0	8	242	195	+47	26 (Note: Prolet 62 were added two points due to a federational decision.)	
8	Prilep	8	4	0	4	207	206	+1	15 (Note: Prilep were added three points due to a federational decision.)	
9	Struga	8	3	1	4	231	222	+9	14 (Note: Sturga were added four points due to a federational decision.)	
10	Radoviš	8	3	0	5	188	214	−26	9	
11	Skopje 2020 (O)	8	1	1	6	193	224	−31	5 (Note: Skopje 2010 were added one point due to a federational decision.)	Qualification for Relegation play-offs
—	Metalurg (R)	0	0	0	0	0	0	0	0	Withdrawal (Note: Metalurg has been suspended from the Macedonian Handball Super League due to financial problems.)

Source: Macedonian Handball Federation - Супер Лига Мажи – Плеј Аут (2021/2022) (in Macedonian), Flashscore
Rules for classification: 1) points; 2) goal difference; 3) head-to-head points; 4) goals scored; 5) head-to-head goal difference; 6) head-to-head number of goals scored.
(O) Play-off winners; (R) Relegated

== Promotion/relegation play-offs ==
The 11th-placed teams of the Macedonian Super League faces the 4th-placed team of the Group B in Macedonian First League.

Team 1	Score	Team 2
Skopje 2020 (I)	28–27	(II) Aerodrom

Skopje 2020 won the 28–27 int these match, and therefore both clubs remain in their respective leagues.

== See also ==
- 2022 Macedonian Handball Cup
