= Alfred Jönsson =

Swedish handball player (born 1998)

Personal information
- Nationality: Swedish
- Born: 21 February 1998 (age 28) Lund, Sweden
- Height: 1.93 m (6 ft 4 in)

Sport
- Sport: Handball
- Position: Left back
- Current club: Ribe-Esbjerg HH
- Number: 81

Senior clubs
- Years: Team
- –2015: H43 Lund
- 2015–2019: Lugi HF
- 2019–2021: TSV Hannover-Burgdorf
- 2021–2024: Skjern Håndbold
- 2024–: Ribe-Esbjerg HH
National team
Years	Team	Apps	(Gls)
2020–	Sweden	18	(21)
Medal record
World Championship
Silver medal – second place	2021 Egypt
- Updated on 24 August 2024

Alfred Jönsson (born 21 February 1998) is a Swedish handball player playing for the Danish team Ribe-Esbjerg HH and the Swedish national team.

He represented Sweden at the 2021 World Men's Handball Championship.
