= Óðinn Þór Ríkharðsson =

Icelandic handball player (born 1997)

Personal information
- Nationality: Icelandic
- Born: 23 October 1997 (age 28) Reykjavík, Iceland
- Height: 1.83 m (6 ft 0 in)

Sport
- Sport: Handball
- Position: Right wing
- Current club: Kadetten Schaffhausen
- Number: 6

Youth career
- Years: Team
- –2013: HK

Senior clubs
- Years: Team
- 2013–2015: HK
- 2015–2016: Fram
- 2016–2018: FH
- 2018–2020: GOG Håndbold
- 2020–2021: TTH Holstebro
- 2021: KA
- 2021: VfL Gummersbach
- 2021–2022: KA
- 2022–: Kadetten Schaffhausen
National team
Years	Team	Apps	(Gls)
2017–	Iceland	56	(173)
- Updated on 8 January 2026

Óðinn Þór Ríkharðsson (23 October 1997) is an Icelandic handball player for Kadetten Schaffhausen and the Icelandic national handball team.

He represented Iceland at the 2019 World Men's Handball Championship. He was the top scorer of the 2022–23 EHF European League, scoring 110 goals.

At the 2026 European Men's Handball Championship he finished 4th with Iceland, losing to Denmark in the semifinal and Croatia in the third-place playoff.
