= Salvador Salvador =

Portuguese handball player (born 2001)

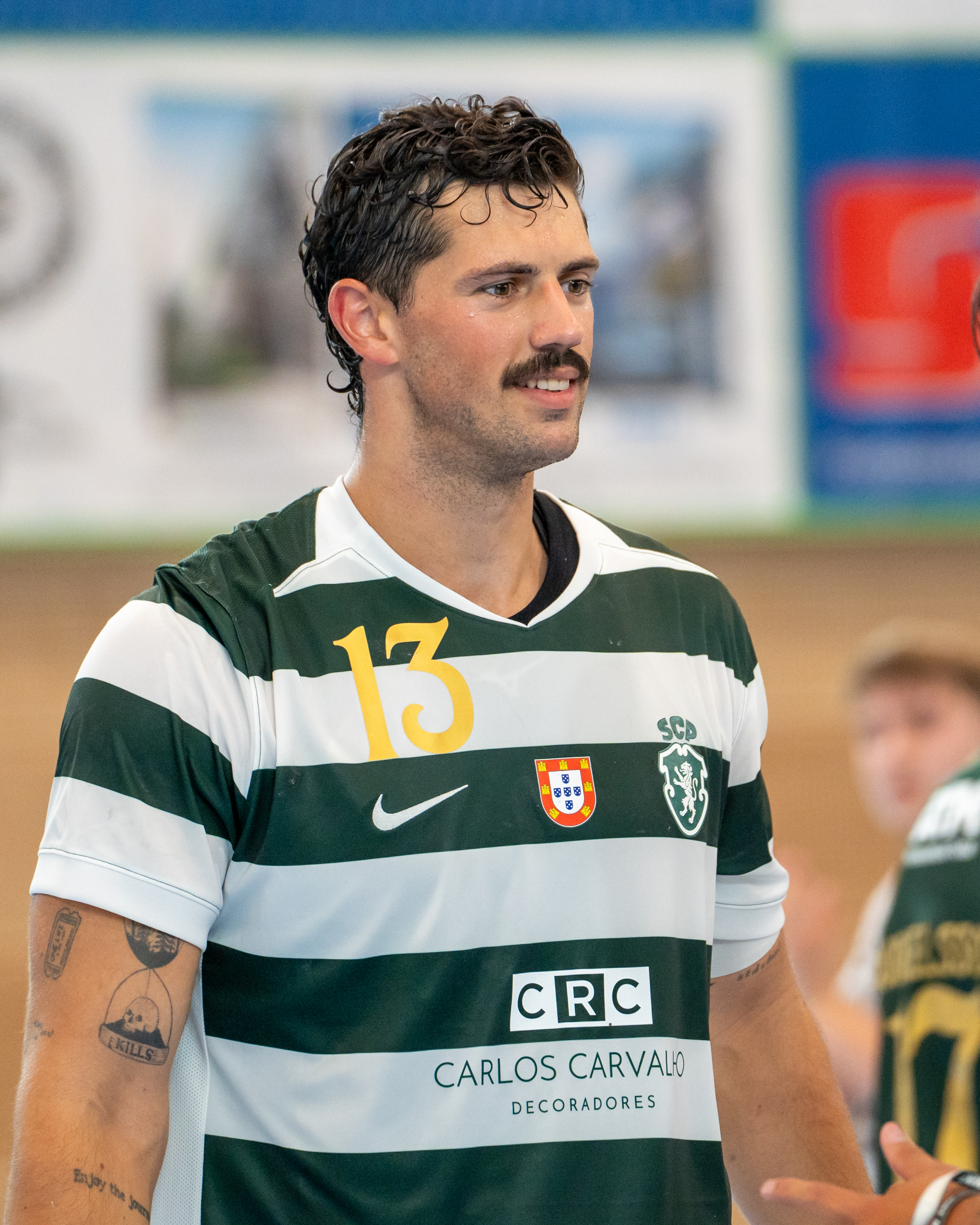
- Salvador Salvador in 2026

Personal information
- Full name: Salvador Martinho Rocha Nogueira Salvador
- Nationality: Portuguese
- Born: 29 July 2001 (age 25) Samora Correia, Portugal
- Height: 1.97 m (6 ft 6 in)

Sport
- Sport: Handball
- Position: Left back
- Current club: Sporting CP
- Number: 13

Youth career
- Years: Team
- 2010–2014: NA Samora Correia
- 2014–2019: Sporting CP

Senior clubs
- Years: Team
- 2018–: Sporting CP
- 2019–2020: → Boa-Hora FC (loan)
National team
Years	Team	Apps	(Gls)
–	Portugal	42	(89)
- Updated on 14 January 2026

Salvador Martinho Rocha Nogueira Salvador better known as Salvador Salvador (born 29 July 2001) is a Portuguese handball player for Sporting CP and the Portuguese national team.

He started playing handball in his hometown at NA Samora Correia at the age of 8. Prior to that he had played soccer.

In the 2019–20 season he was loaned out to league rivals Boa-Hora FC, where he scored 150 goals in 27 matches.

In 2025 he was part of the Portugal team that reached the semifinals of the World Championship for the first time in history. They lost the semifinals to Denmark and the third place playoff to France. At the 2026 European Men's Handball Championship he was part of the Portugal team that got 5th place, their best ever finish at a European Championship.

== Individual awards ==
- Best Defender of the European Championship: 2026
