= GP Joule Arena =

Multi-purpose hall in Flensburg, Germany

Coordinates: 54°46′24″N 9°27′10.2″E

GP JOULE Arena

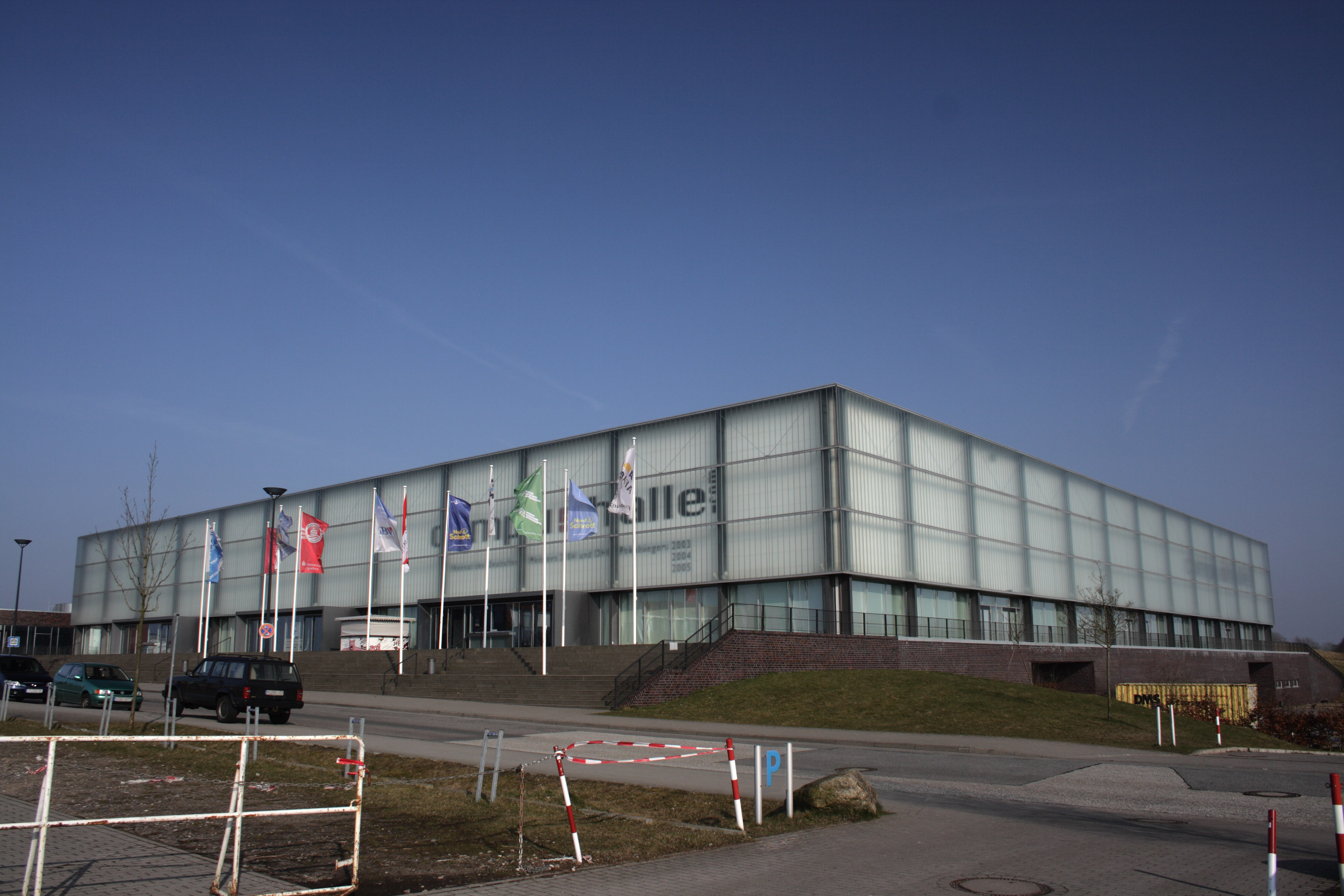
- Interactive map of GP JOULE Arena
- Former names: Campushalle (2001–2012, 2023–2024); Flens-Arena (2012–2023)
- Capacity: 6.300

Website
- http://www.flens-Arena.de/

Flens-Arena Logo

The GP JOULE Arena (originally Campushalle) is an indoor sporting arena located in Flensburg, north Germany. The capacity of the arena is 6,300 people. It is currently home to the SG Flensburg-Handewitt handball team.

From 2012 to 2023 the arena was sponsored by the Flensburger Brauerei. The current sponsor GP Joule is an electric utility based in Reußenköge.
