= 2018–19 Handball-Bundesliga =

Handball-Bundesliga
- Season: 2018–19
- Champions: SG Flensburg-Handewitt
- Relegated: SG BBM Bietigheim; VfL Gummersbach
- Champions League: SG Flensburg-Handewitt; THW Kiel
- EHF Cup: SC Magdeburg; Rhein-Neckar Löwen; MT Melsungen
- Matches: 306
- Goals: 16,227 (53.03 per match)
- Top goalscorer: Matthias Musche (256 goals)
- Highest attendance: 13,200; Rhein-Neckar Löwen v SG Flensburg-Handewitt
- Lowest attendance: 1,655; SG BBM Bietigheim v GWD Minden
- Attendance: 1,470,818 (4,807 per match)

The 2018–19 Handball-Bundesliga was the 54th season of the Handball-Bundesliga, Germany's premier handball league and the 42nd season consisting of only one league. It ran from 23 August 2018 to 9 June 2019.

SG Flensburg-Handewitt won their third overall and second consecutive title.

== Teams ==
Locations of the 2018–19 Handball-Bundesliga teams

=== Team changes ===
Promoted from 2017–18 2. Handball-Bundesliga	Relegated from 2017–18 Handball-Bundesliga
Bergischer HC; SG BBM Bietigheim	TV Hüttenberg; TuS Nettelstedt-Lübbecke

=== Arenas and locations ===
The SAP Arena in Mannheim, home of the Rhein-Neckar Löwen, is the largest venue in the league as it seats 13,200 fans in its HBL configuration. While the smallest is the Scharrena, the smaller of the two home venues of TVB Stuttgart, only being able to accommodate 2,251 fans.

Team	Location	Arena	Capacity
Bergischer HC	Wuppertal; Solingen; Düsseldorf	Uni-Halle; Klingenhalle; ISS Dome	3.200; 2.800; 12.500
Füchse Berlin	Berlin	Max-Schmeling-Halle	9.000
SG BBM Bietigheim	Bietigheim-Bissingen; Ludwigsburg	EgeTrans Arena; Arena Ludwigsburg	4.517; 3.715
HC Erlangen	Nuremberg	Arena Nürnberger Versicherung	8.308
SG Flensburg-Handewitt	Flensburg	Flens-Arena	6.300
Die Eulen Ludwigshafen	Ludwigshafen	Friedrich-Ebert-Halle	2.350
Frisch Auf Göppingen	Göppingen	EWS Arena	5.600
VfL Gummersbach	Gummersbach	Schwalbe-Arena	4.132
TSV Hannover-Burgdorf	Hanover	TUI Arena; Swiss Life Hall	9.850; 4.460
THW Kiel	Kiel	Sparkassen-Arena	10.285
SC DHfK Leipzig	Leipzig	Arena Leipzig	6.327
TBV Lemgo	Lemgo	Phoenix Contact Arena	4.790
SC Magdeburg	Magdeburg	GETEC Arena	6.600
MT Melsungen	Kassel	Rothenbach-Halle	4.300
GWD Minden	Minden	Kampa-Halle	4.059
Rhein-Neckar Löwen	Mannheim	SAP Arena	13.200
TVB 1898 Stuttgart	Stuttgart	Scharrena Stuttgart; Porsche-Arena	2.251; 6.211
HSG Wetzlar	Wetzlar	Rittal Arena Wetzlar	4.421

=== Personnel and finances ===
Team	Head coach	Captain	Kit manufacturer	Shirt sponsor	Operational budget
Bergischer HC	(Germany) Sebastian Hinze	(Germany) Kristian Nippes	Salming	WKW automotive	3.2 M€
Füchse Berlin	(Bosnia and Herzegovina) / (Germany) Velimir Petković	(Denmark) Hans Lindberg	Hummel	Deutsche Wohnen	6.0 M€
SG BBM Bietigheim	(Germany) Ralf Bader	(Germany) Patrick Rentschler	Erima	OLYMP	1.5 M€
HC Erlangen	(Iceland) Aðalsteinn Eyjólfsson	(Germany) Michael Haaß	Kempa	HIETEC	5.0 M€
SG Flensburg-Handewitt	(Germany) Maik Machulla	(Sweden) Tobias Karlsson	Erima	Dänisches Bettenlager	7.0 M€
Die Eulen Ludwigshafen	(Germany) Benjamin Matschke	(Germany) Gunnar Dietrich	Erima	Technische Werke Ludwigshafen	1.2 M€
Frisch Auf Göppingen	(Germany) Hartmut Mayerhoffer	(Germany) Tim Kneule	Hummel	Stahlbau Nägele	5.2 M€
VfL Gummersbach	(Germany) Torge Greve	(Croatia) Drago Vukovic	Select	Schwalbe	4.0 M€
TSV Hannover-Burgdorf	(Spain) Antonio Carlos Ortega	(Germany) Kai Häfner	Adidas	CP-Pharma	4.5 M€
THW Kiel	(Iceland) Alfreð Gíslason	(Croatia) Domagoj Duvnjak	Adidas	Star	9.5 M€
SC DHfK Leipzig	(Germany) André Haber	(Germany) Jens Vortmann	Puma	Leipziger Gruppe	4.9 M€
TBV Lemgo	(Germany) Florian Kehrmann	(Germany) Andrej Kogut	Salming	Phoenix Contact	3.5 M€
SC Magdeburg	(Germany) Bennet Wiegert	(Norway) Christian O´Sullivan	Kempa	GETEC	5.0 M€
MT Melsungen	(Germany) Heiko Grimm	(Germany) Michael Müller	Salming	B. Braun	5.0 M€
GWD Minden	(Germany) Frank Carstens	(Sweden) Dalibor Doder	Nike	Harting	3.5 M€
Rhein-Neckar Löwen	(Denmark) Nikolaj Jacobsen	(Switzerland) Andy Schmid	Erima	Admiral	6.5 M€
TVB 1898 Stuttgart	(Germany) Jürgen Schweikardt	(Germany) Simon Baumgarten	Kempa	Kärcher	4.0 M€
HSG Wetzlar	(Germany) Kai Wandschneider	(North Macedonia) Filip Mirkulovski	Mizuno	Licher	4.0 M€

== Standings ==
Pos	Team	Pld	W	D	L	GF	GA	GD	Pts	Qualification or relegation
1	SG Flensburg-Handewitt (C)	34	32	0	2	958	768	+190	64	Champions League
2	THW Kiel	34	31	0	3	1018	806	+212	62	Champions League
3	SC Magdeburg	34	27	0	7	1010	867	+143	54	EHF Cup
4	Rhein-Neckar Löwen	34	24	2	8	960	851	+109	50	EHF Cup
5	MT Melsungen	34	21	0	13	922	900	+22	42	EHF Cup
6	Füchse Berlin	34	19	0	15	923	898	+25	38	
7	Bergischer HC	34	18	2	14	891	880	+11	38	
8	Frisch Auf Göppingen	34	17	2	15	901	899	+2	36	
9	HC Erlangen	34	14	2	18	853	881	−28	30	
10	HSG Wetzlar	34	14	1	19	859	883	−24	29	
11	SC DHfK Leipzig	34	12	3	19	861	871	−10	27	
12	TBV Lemgo	34	11	4	19	861	885	−24	26	
13	TSV Hannover-Burgdorf	34	12	2	20	935	960	−25	26	
14	GWD Minden	34	12	1	21	941	976	−35	25	
15	TVB 1898 Stuttgart	34	10	3	21	911	998	−87	23	
16	Die Eulen Ludwigshafen	34	5	4	25	802	955	−153	14	
17	VfL Gummersbach (R)	34	6	2	26	809	963	−154	14	Relegated
18	SG BBM Bietigheim (R)	34	6	2	26	809	983	−174	14	Relegated

Source: DKB
Rules for classification: 1) points; 2) Goal difference; 3) Goals scored.
(C) Champions; (R) Relegated

== Results ==
Home \ Away	BRG	BER	BIE	ERL	FLE	FRI	GÖP	GUM	HAN	KIE	LEI	LEM	MAG	MEL	MIN	RNL	STU	WET
Bergischer HC	—	28–26	26–23	35–26	24–27	27–23	25–28	30–28	25–22	23–27	27–23	35–26	23–27	25–24	26–21	25–30	29–28	26–22
Füchse Berlin	26–22	—	30–26	26–25	25–30	32–20	29–33	25–19	29–28	29–30	26–23	29–23	27–24	24–26	29–27	34–33	25–30	25–27
SG BBM Bietigheim	21–28	28–36	—	24–26	20–33	27–18	30–29	25–25	29–27	21–32	15–24	25–23	29–33	24–33	28–30	21–36	19–28	26–26
HC Erlangen	26–18	22–27	27–25	—	26–27	26–22	24–25	30–22	25–25	21–30	24–23	28–25	26–25	24–25	25–29	23–23	31–25	27–20
SG Flensburg-Handewitt	25–23	26–18	31–22	28–18	—	35–23	26–15	28–20	29–28	26–25	27–21	33–24	26–25	30–24	35–28	27–20	29–21	30–29
Die Eulen Ludwigshafen	23–22	26–30	23–24	23–25	18–30	—	23–32	26–27	25–27	19–26	27–24	20–19	27–38	22–27	31–30	21–28	23–23	25–29
Frisch Auf Göppingen	27–30	21–18	31–27	25–23	23–28	30–26	—	35–26	27–26	25–29	34–27	20–24	24–31	27–30	21–21	25–28	31–25	22–24
VfL Gummersbach	22–29	20–29	28–21	25–27	23–33	20–20	22–26	—	25–26	22–35	30–28	25–19	20–31	23–28	20–25	28–23	31–28	19–24
TSV Hannover-Burgdorf	29–26	26–25	26–27	26–24	28–33	33–28	29–30	30–24	—	25–32	30–28	27–27	26–31	29–36	30–25	28–30	33–22	23–25
THW Kiel	32–24	26–22	34–20	27–21	20–18	37–21	28–26	31–25	30–26	—	27–22	28–24	25–28	37–20	39–19	31–28	32–19	29–19
SC DHfK Leipzig	25–25	32–27	31–24	26–25	20–21	28–22	29–25	28–18	31–26	24–25	—	22–22	24–25	26–29	26–25	28–26	26–27	21–25
TBV Lemgo	22–22	34–30	40–27	31–23	21–23	23–23	25–30	30–16	26–31	26–34	24–20	—	22–23	28–26	23–25	23–25	29–24	25–24
SC Magdeburg	32–27	25–27	23–19	31–25	24–23	35–26	28–29	29–24	34–23	35–30	28–20	29–24	—	32–24	40–31	29–32	37–30	30–25
MT Melsungen	26–23	26–22	31–24	27–26	18–24	30–26	25–22	33–27	28–25	25–29	35–27	31–27	23–28	—	26–21	23–26	24–26	26–24
GWD Minden	32–35	27–28	30–26	29–22	28–31	29–28	28–29	40–28	29–32	29–37	24–26	27–30	25–29	32–27	—	26–31	38–25	24–22
Rhein-Neckar Löwen	26–20	28–25	30–15	29–26	23–26	26–29	33–27	30–24	29–23	24–27	24–24	28–21	28–22	34–26	32–29	—	34–29	31–21
TBV 1898 Stuttgart	30–31	33–34	31–26	26–28	20–30	26–26	26–26	31–30	37–34	27–30	29–32	25–23	27–40	30–26	30–31	20–26	—	30–28
HSG Wetzlar	25–27	24–29	24–21	27–28	23–30	30–19	26–21	30–23	29–28	23–27	23–22	27–28	26–31	26–34	31–27	25–26	26–23	—

Source: DKB
Legend: Blue = home team win; Yellow = draw; Red = away team win.

== Awards ==
=== Monthly awards ===
Month	Player of the Month			Goal of the Month	
Month	Player	Position	Club	Player	Club
September	(Germany) Matthias Musche	LW	SC Magdeburg	(Germany) Thomas Roth	TSV Södel
October	(Germany) Michael Kraus	CB	TBV 1898 Stuttgart	(Germany) Bastian Schwengers	FC Schalke 04
November	(Italy) Domenico Ebner	GK	SG BBM Bietigheim	(Germany) Christopher Czens	Lehrter SV
December	(Germany) Silvio Heinevetter	GK	Füchse Berlin	(Germany) Lasse Scharge	Oranienburger HC
February	(Germany) Matthias Musche	LW	SC Magdeburg		
March	(Denmark) Michael Damgaard	LB/CB	SC Magdeburg		
April	(Denmark) Niklas Landin	GK	THW Kiel		
May	(Germany) Andreas Wolff	GK	THW Kiel		

The goal of the month award can be awarded to anyone in the league system while the player of the month award only count Bundesliga performances.

== Number of teams by state ==
Rank	State	Number of teams	Club(s)
1	Baden-Württemberg	4	SG BBM Bietigheim, Frisch Auf Göppingen, Rhein-Neckar Löwen, TVB Stuttgart
1	North Rhine-Westphalia	4	Bergischer HC, VfL Gummersbach, TBV Lemgo, GWD Minden
3	Hesse	2	MT Melsungen, HSG Wetzlar
3	Schleswig-Holstein	2	SG Flensburg-Handewitt, THW Kiel
5	Bayern	1	HC Erlangen
5	Berlin	1	Füchse Berlin
5	Lower Saxony	1	TSV Hannover-Burgdorf
5	Rhineland-Palatinate	1	Die Eulen Ludwigshafen
5	Saxony	1	SC DHfK Leipzig
5	Saxony-Anhalt	1	SC Magdeburg
