= Tobias Karlsson (handballer) =

Swedish handball player (born 1981)

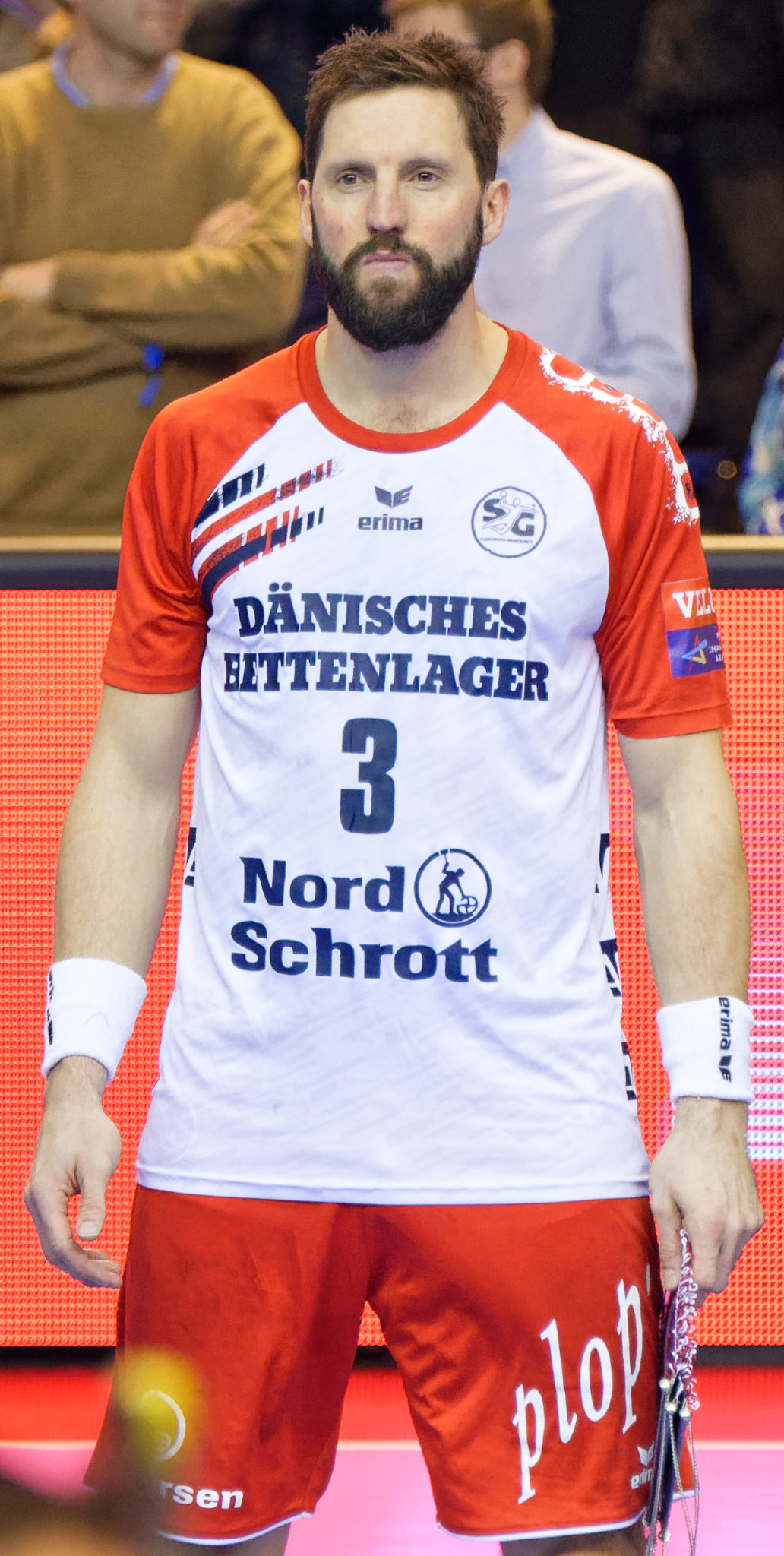

Personal information
- Nationality: Swedish
- Born: 4 June 1981 (age 45) Karlskrona, Sweden
- Height: 1.96 m (6 ft 5 in)

Sport
- Sport: Handball
- Position: Pivot
- Current club: Retired
- Number: 3

Senior clubs
- Years: Team
- –2002: Hästö IF
- 2002–2003: Stavanger IF
- 2003–2006: Hammarby IF Handboll
- 2006: THW Kiel
- 2006–2008: Hammarby IF Handboll
- 2008–2009: HSG Nordhorn
- 2009–2019: SG Flensburg-Handewitt
National team
Years	Team	Apps	(Gls)
2006–2016	Sweden	180	(81)
Medal record
Olympic Games
Silver medal – second place	2012 London	Team

Tobias Karlsson (born 4 June 1981) is a Swedish former handball player who last played for SG Flensburg Handewitt. He competed for the Swedish national team that won the silver medal at the 2012 Summer Olympics in London.

He was named Swedish Handballer of the year in 2013.

== Honours ==
- German Championship:
  - Gold: 2018, 2019
- National Cup of Germany:
  - Gold: 2015
- Swedish Championship:
  - Gold: 2006, 2007, 2008
- EHF Champions League:
  - Gold: 2014
- EHF Cup Winner's Cup:
  - Gold: 2012
