= ZAG-Arena =

Arena in Hanover, Germany

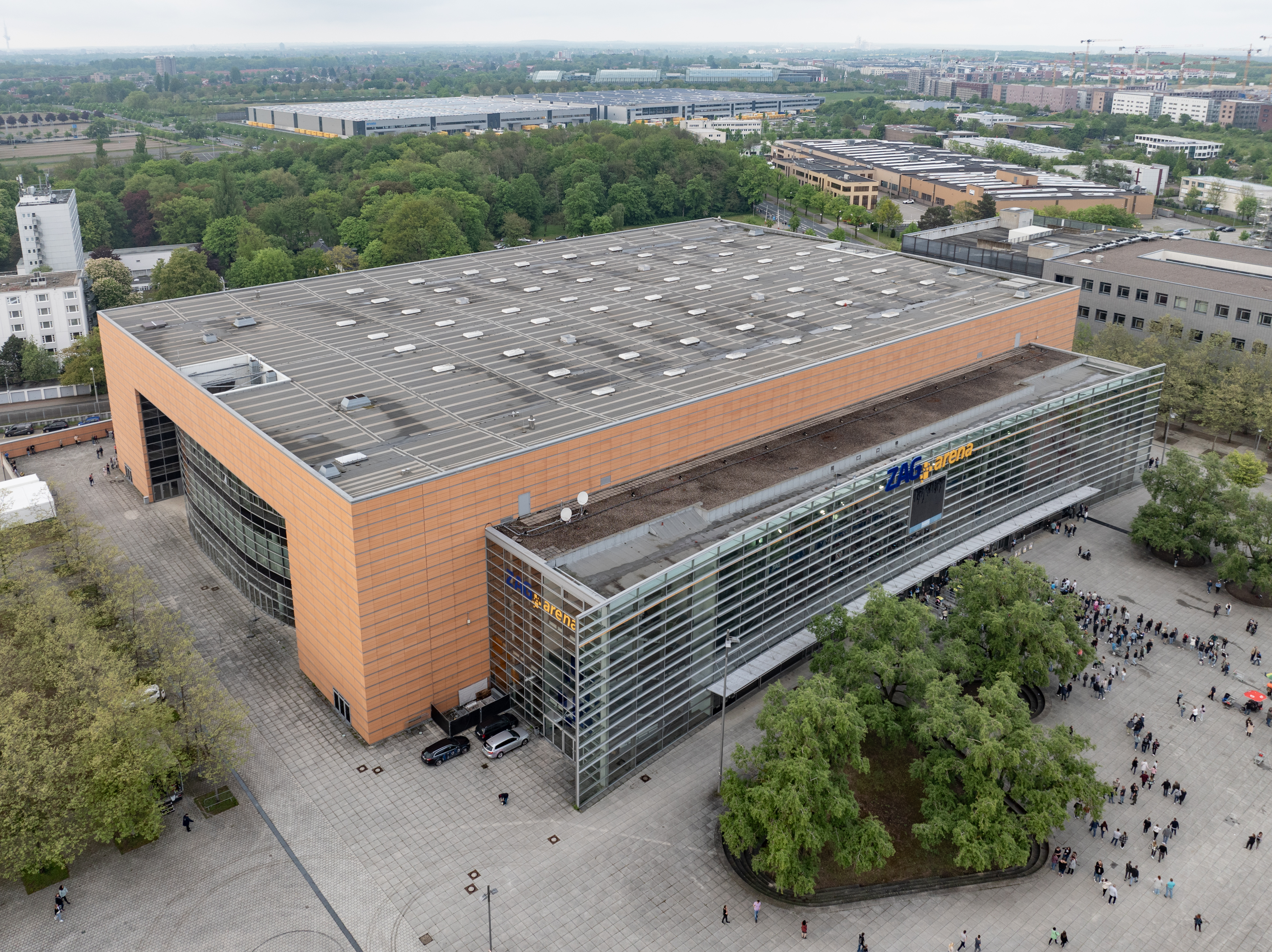
- Interactive map of ZAG-Arena
- Former names: Preussag Arena (2000–2004); TUI Arena (2004–2020)
- Location: Hanover, Germany
- Coordinates: 52°19′21″N 9°49′00″E
- Owner: Arena Hannover GmbH (Günter Papenburg)
- Capacity: 10,767 (ice hockey, handball); 14,000 (including standing areas)

Construction
- Groundbreaking: August 1998
- Opened: April 2000
- Cost: 70 million euros
- Architect: Helmut Sprenger

Tenants
- Hannover Scorpions (DEL) (2001–2013); TSV Hannover-Burgdorf (HBL) (2011–present); Hannover Indians (Oberliga (ice hockey)) (2013–2014)

Website
- Official Website

ZAG-Arena (formerly Preussag Arena and TUI Arena) is an arena in Hanover, Germany. The arena opened in 2000. It holds 10,767 during hockey or handball matches and up to 14,000 during concerts. It is the biggest indoor venue in the Hanover Region, and most major concerts are held there. The arena is situated at the Expo Plaza in the Expo 2000 grounds, in the south of Hanover, astride the Kronsberg and Mittelfeld areas.

== Tenants ==
It was primarily used for ice hockey and was the home arena of the Hannover Scorpions. After the Scorpions sold their DEL-License to the Schwenninger Wild Wings in 2013, the license agreement for the arena wasn't renewed and the Scorpions left the arena permanently. Since then no tenant is using the arena on a regular basis.

The arena was used for the local derbies of the rival clubs Hannover Indians and Hannover Scorpions (now both playing in the third tier Oberliga-Nord) in 2013 and 2014 though. If these games are to be held there in the future is uncertain.

The handball club TSV Hannover-Burgdorf is also using the arena for games with high attendances at irregular intervals, for example in 2011 against Eintracht Hildesheim and 2013 against Frisch Auf Göppingen. In the 2016–17 Handball-Bundesliga season, the club played five matches in the arena, before playing up to 13 of their 17-season home matches in the arena from the 2017–18 season onwards.

The arena has been constantly struggling with financial problems since the day of opening and has been a money-losing business since then due to the lack of enough regular events. After the departure of the only permanent tenant, Hannover Scorpions, in 2013, the situation became even more critical for the owner Günter Papenburg, who is also the owner of the Scorpions. He is still trying to attract more events there to minimize his financial loss.

== Events ==
Janet Jackson was scheduled to perform during her All for You Tour on 12 November 2001, but the show was cancelled because of the 11 September attacks. Scorpions performed a Classic-Concert with the Berlin Philharmonic on 1 June 2000 at the arena and, during her Get Your Sting and Blackout World Tour on 1 June 2010, a Rockshow. In the arena there is a Scorpions-Lounge with a variety of devotional of the band. Roger Waters played the venue during his "In The Flesh" World Tour on 22 May 2002.

On 5 May 2003, Irish vocal pop band Westlife held a concert for their Unbreakable Tour supporting their album Unbreakable – The Greatest Hits Volume 1.

Tina Turner performed there during her Tina!: 50th Anniversary Tour on 4 February 2009.

The Backstreet Boys performed there during their 2014 In a World Like This Tour.

Depeche Mode performed at the stadium on 3 November 2009 during their Tour of the Universe.

On 14 February 2013 the German national final for the Eurovision Song Contest, Unser Song für Malmö, took place there. The national final returned to the venue on 5 March 2015 as Unser Song für Österreich

In March 2017, Fury in the Slaughterhouse started their 30th Anniversary tour at the arena, playing three dates.

On 2nd May 2025, Billie Eilish made her first German tour stop for the Hit Me Hard and Soft: The Tour at the arena.

== Gallery ==
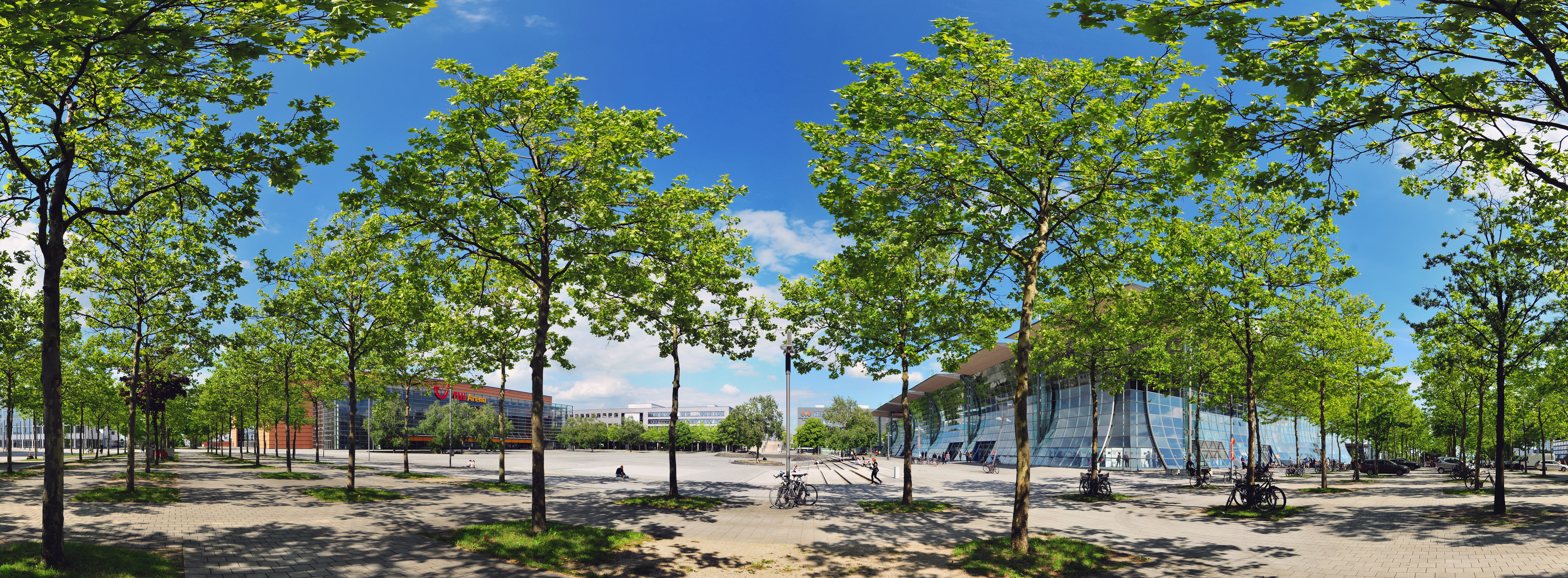
Expo Plaza

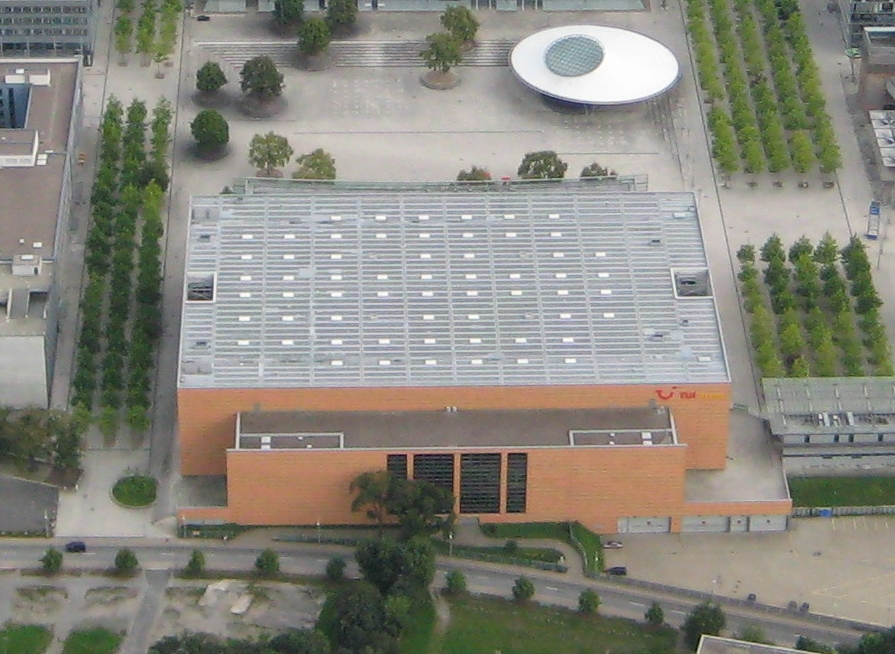
TUI Arena

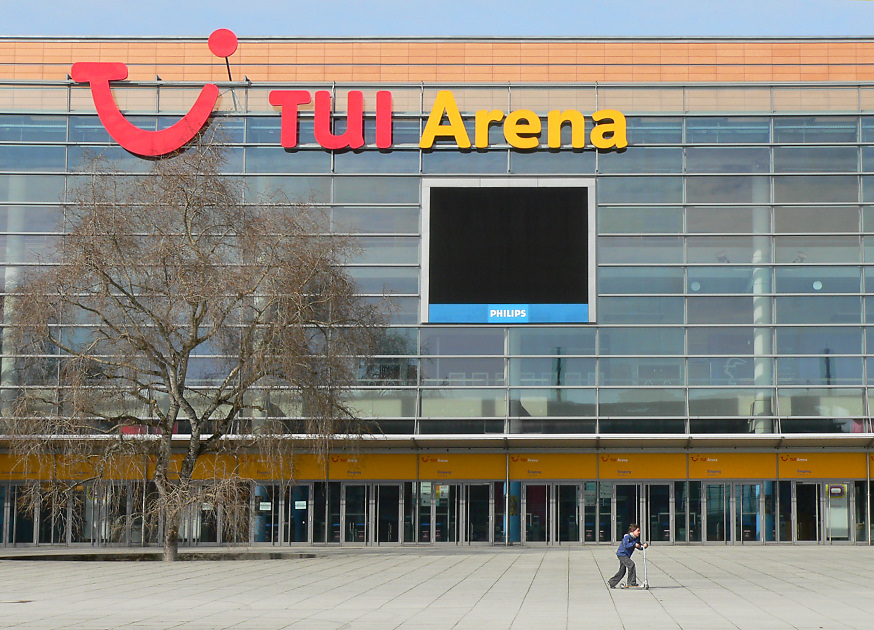
Frontal (2009)

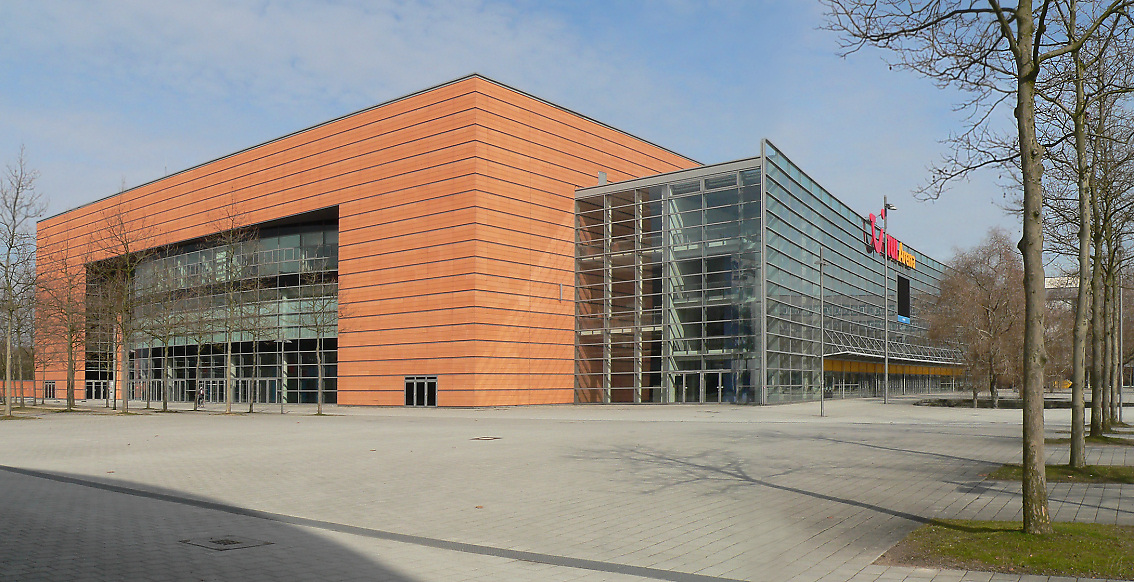
Side view (2009)

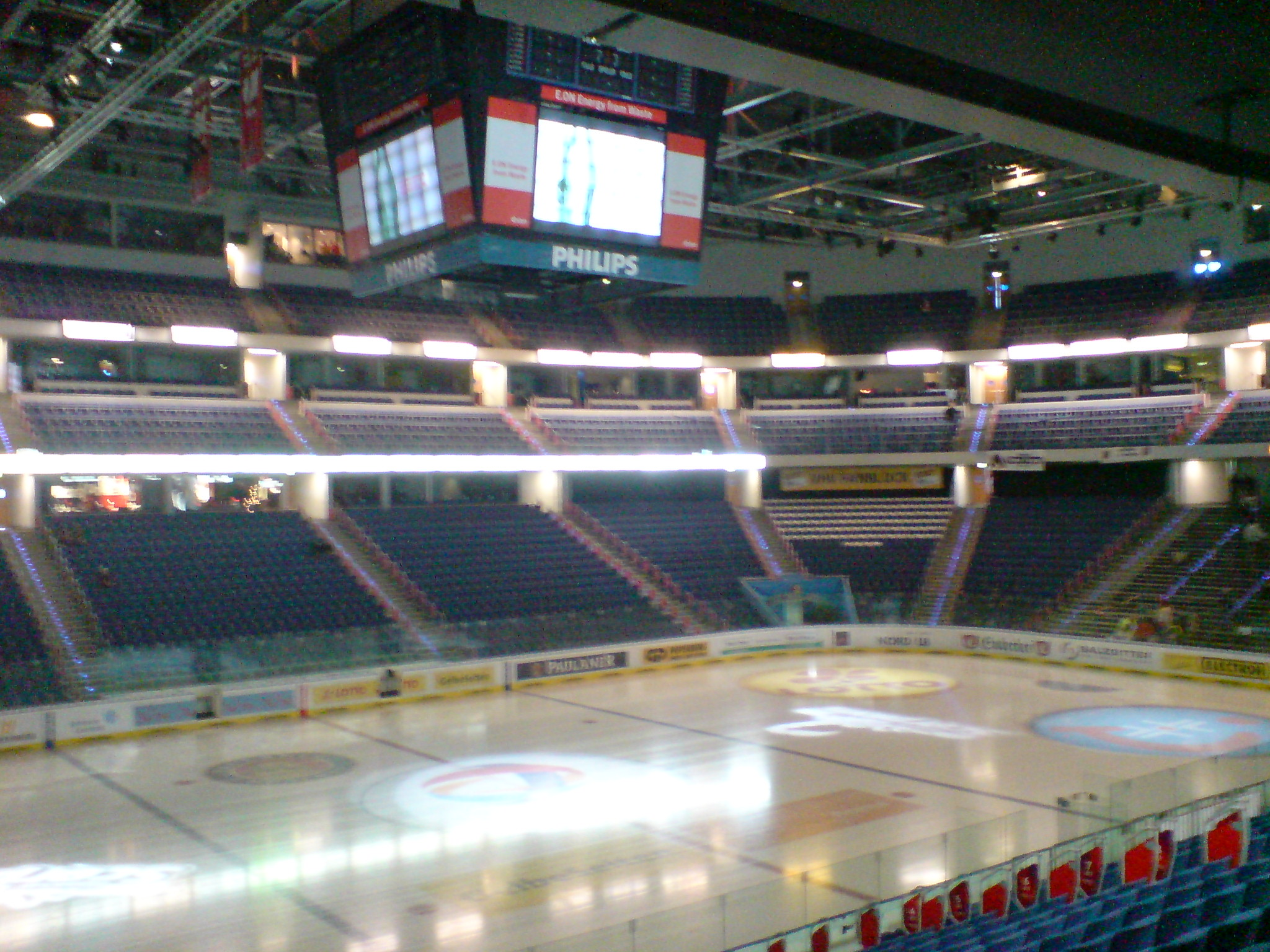
Interior (2008)

== See also ==
- Expo 2000
- Hanover Fairground
- List of indoor arenas in Germany
