= Leipziger Verkehrsbetriebe =

German public transport operator

- Parent: 100 % Local authority (Stadt Leipzig, "City of Leipzig"), through the municipal undertaking Leipziger Versorgungs- und Verkehrsgesellschaft (LVV, "Leipzig Supply and Public Transport Company")
- Headquarters: Leipziger Verkehrsbetriebe (LVB) GmbH, Georgiring 3 • 04103 Leipzig Germany
- Stops: ca. 606 Motorbus stops ca. 515 Tramcar stops
- Website: www.l.de/verkehrsbetriebe

The Leipziger Verkehrsbetriebe (LVB), literally translated into English as the Leipzig Transport Authority, operates the tramway and bus transport services in Leipzig, Germany. The LVB network is a part of the regional public transport association, the Mitteldeutscher Verkehrsverbund (MDV). The LVB was formed by the merger, from 1 January 1917, of two predecessor undertakings, the Großen Leipziger Straßenbahn (GLSt, "Greater Leipzig Tramway Company") and the Leipziger Elektrischen Straßenbahn (LESt, "Leipzig Electric Tramway Company"). The merged undertaking was also known as GLSt until it was reorganized and renamed as the LVB, from 29 July 1938.

== Organization ==
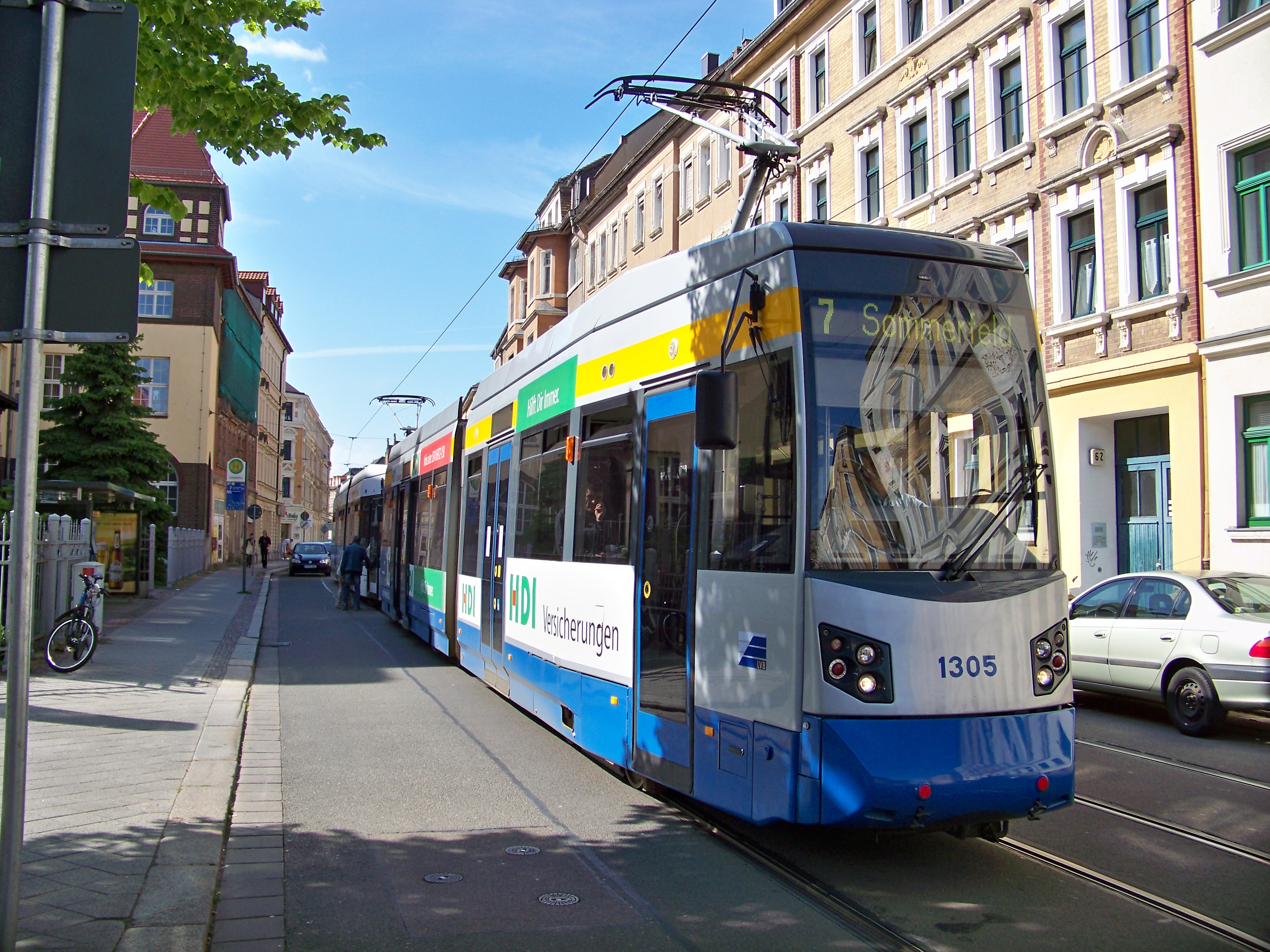
Built by LVB: The Leoliner

The company is organized as a holding company. LVB owns infrastructure such as track, depots and land, and all vehicles. It holds the concession ("license") for public transport in Leipzig, and is responsible for organization, planning and management of public transport. It provides these services through its various subsidiary undertakings. The LVB Group consists of the following undertakings:

- LeoBus GmbH (organized from 1 November 2005 from the transport undertakings Regionalverkehr Leipzig (RVL, "Regional Transport Leipzig"); Regionalverkehr Taucha (RVT, "Regional Transport Taucha), Regionalverkehr Riesa (RVR, "Regional Transport Riesa"), Deutsche Nahverkehrsgesellschaft (DNVG, German Suburban Transport Company) and the motorbus division of Leipziger Stadtverkehrsbetriebe (LSVB, Leipzig City Transport Company). Operates regular public transport and school bus services in the region surrounding Leipzig, and other transport services . LeoBus also provides servicing for the motor vehicle and bus fleet.
- Leipziger Stadtverkehrsbetriebe GmbH & Co. KG (LSVB, "Leipzig City Transport Company LLP") operates the Leipzig tramway and bus networks under contract to LVB .
- LTB Leipziger Transport und Logistik Betriebe GmbH ("Leipzig Transport and Logistics Services LLC") manages the vehicle fleet, vehicle maintenance and also provides transport and vehicle leasing services .
- Verkehrs-Consult Leipzig GmbH (VCL, "Transport Consulting Leipzig LLC") provides consulting, planning and project engineering services for passenger and goods transportation .
- IFTEC GmbH & Co. KG, organized from the predecessor undertakings LFB and LIB, provides "custom maintenance solutions" for rail infrastructure and vehicles. IFTEC is a joint undertaking of LVB and Siemens AG, with each holding 50 percent of the shares. (LFB, Leipziger Fahrzeugservice-Betriebe GmbH ("Leipzig Vehicle Service Enterprises LLC") provided "industrial service and technical systems solution in the field of transport, with special emphasis on rail vehicle maintenance;" it once built vehicles." LIB, Leipziger Infrastruktur Betriebe GmbH & Co. KG ("Leipzig Infrastructure Enterprises LLP") provided maintenance and construction of rail and road transport infrastructure.)
- LEOLINER Fahrzeugbau Leipzig GmbH ("LEOLINER Vehicle Construction Leipzig LLC"), which was formerly the vehicle construction division of the LFB (above), produces the NGTW6L series of six-axle low-floor articulated tramcars, marketed under the name LEOLINER (the name makes reference to the lion on the town's coat of arms) .
- Leipziger Servicebetriebe GmbH (LSB, "Leipzig Service Enterprises LLC"), which manages auto parking facilities and provides support services for transport operations, including security, vehicle cleaning and fare inspection. Other services offered include catering .
- LAB Leipziger Aus- und Weiterbildungsbetriebe GmbH ("Leipzig Training and Advanced Training Services LLC") provides training for tram drivers, commercial drivers, professional training in skilled trade and commercial sectors, and provides advanced-training activities .

These subsidiaries were organized to facilitate tendering of public transport and reduction of public subsidies. They serve outside clients in addition to LVB.

== Lines ==
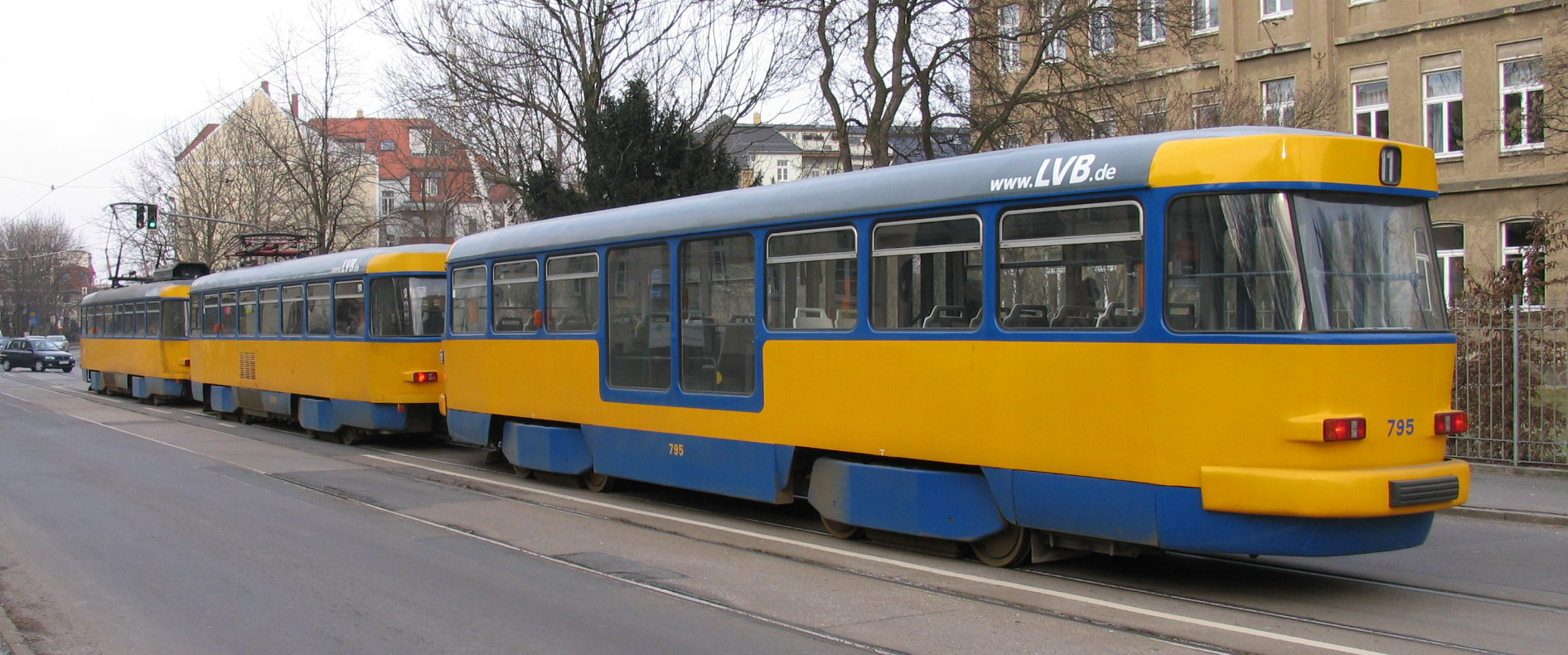
LVB three-car formation (Großzug) of modernized Tatra T4D-M stock with reconstructed low-floor trailer

Bus route letters were replaced by route numbers with the timetable change effective 5 October 1997. In addition, the tramway service network was again revised from 2001 and a marketing campaign began under the name Das Neue Netz ("The New Network"). Thus the following numbering scheme applies currently in Leipzig:

- 1-29: Tramway services
- 30s: Temporary tramway services for construction site and shuttle traffic
- 40s/50s: Temporary Tramway services for large events (Night services were designated in the 50 series in Leipzig until 2001.)
- 60s: Bus services in western and southern districts (primarily Grünau)
- 70s: Bus services in eastern districts
- 80s: Bus services in northern districts (primarily Mockau-Thekla)
- over 100: Regional and suburban bus services

=== Tramway Lines ===
Tram network

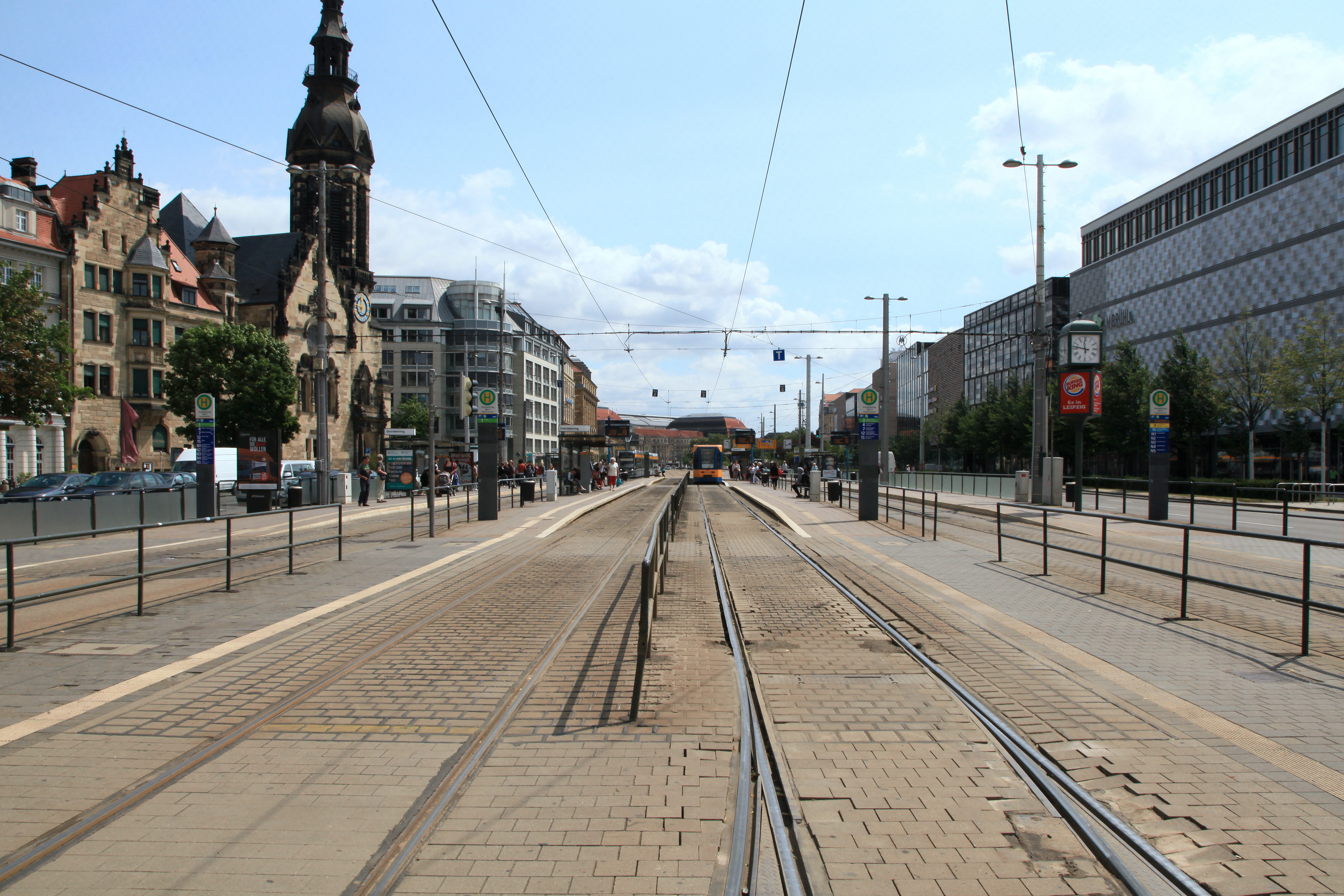
Goerdelerring tramway station, served by 87 trams per hour during weekdays.

The Leipzig tramway network is the second-largest in Germany (after Berlin) and has a radial lattice structure. In contrast to a tangential network, here all lines form the shape of a star. With the exception of line 2, all lines operate on the Inner City Ring via Leipzig Central Station (Hauptbahnhof) and serve at least one of the three stops on Goerdelerring, Augustusplatz or Wilhelm-Leuschner-Platz. With the exception of line 14, the tramway services provide a basic 10-minute interval (15-minute interval during evening and weekend service hours). As the result of overlay of lines, central segments are served as frequently as 2–3 minutes. Line 3 provides a 10-minute interval between Knautkleeberg and Heiterblick, branching to serve different terminals in the north. Some services are short workings and are designated with a letter "E" adjacent to the line number. These operate to and from intermediate terminal points. Line 4^{E} works through at Hauptbahnhof (Central Station) to or from Line 12. Lines 12 and 4^{E} operate to their respective central terminals during peak periods (Technisches Rathaus or Riebeck-/Stötteritzer Straße), where line numbers are changed.

== Vehicles ==
=== Tramcars ===
- Modernized Tatra T4D-M (Type 33c, d, e)
- Low-floor trailers NB4 (Type 68), used for Tatra T4D-M and NGT8
- Low-floor articulated NGT8 (Type 36)
- Low-floor articulated NGT12-LEI (Bombardier Flexity Classic XXL, Type 38) (12 vehicles of the 1. Series; a further 12 vehicles to follow from 2006 September to 2007 May and 9 vehicles of Series 3)
- LVB-built low-floor articulated NGTW6L »Leoliner« (vehicles 1301/1302 are prototypes, 1303 – 1350 are production vehicles)
- Solaris Tramino XL (also known as NGT10) (43 in service, 18 under construction/not in service)

External link: Linienfahrzeuge (Straßenbahn) "Public transport vehicles (Tram)" (in German)

=== Motorbuses ===
- Solaris Urbino 12 IV
- Solaris Urbino 18 III
- Solaris Urbino 18 IV
- Solaris Alpino 8.6
- MAN Lion's City diesel and hybrid
- Mercedes-Benz Citaro diesel and hybrid BlueTec Version
- HESS SwissHybrid
- VDL Citea SLF-120 Electric (Currently not in service)

External link: Linienfahrzeuge (Bus) "Public transport vehicles (Bus)" (in German)

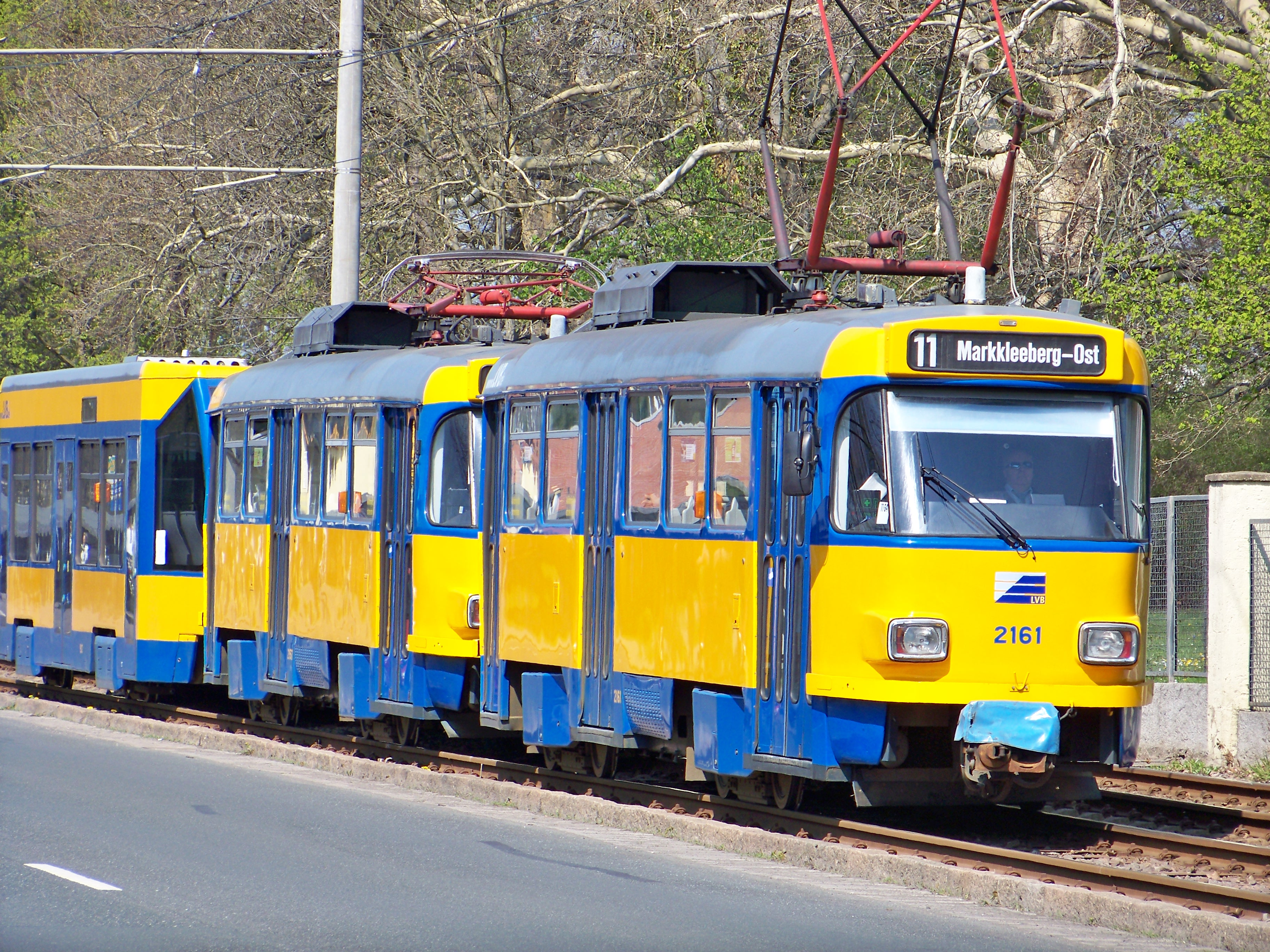
Tatra T4D-M-train with low-floor trailer (NB4), Leipzig

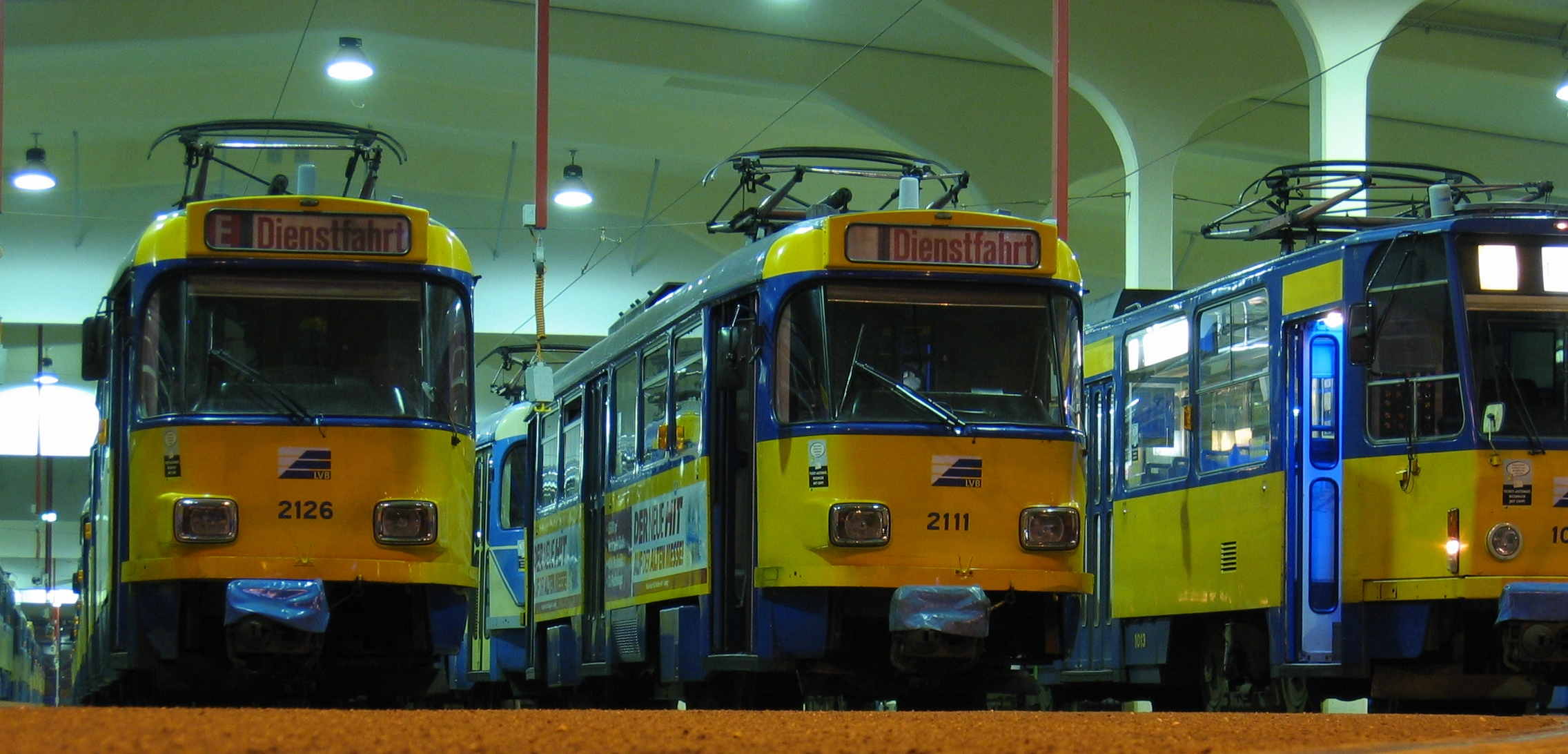
Angerbrücke Depot

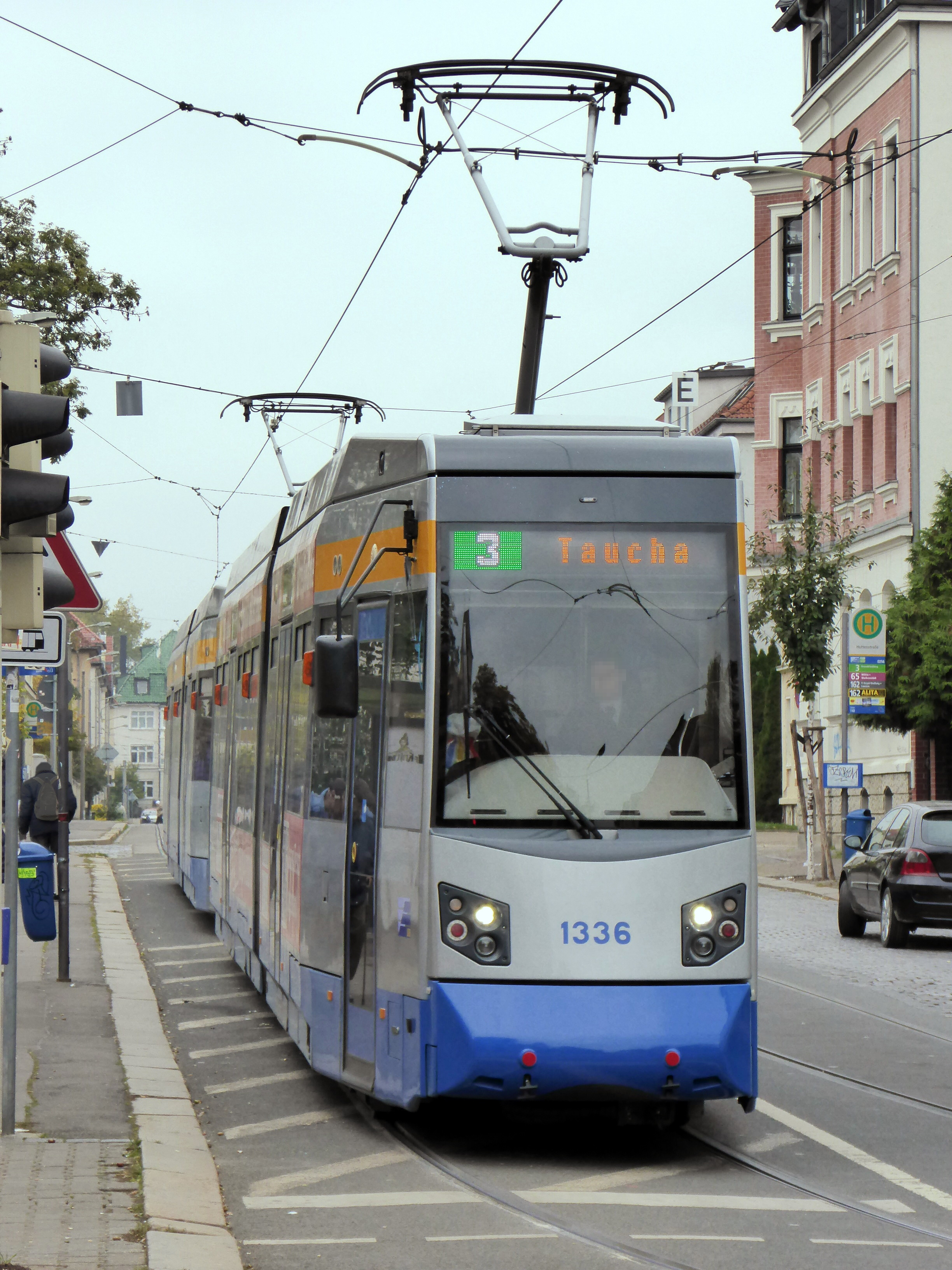
The Leoliner tram

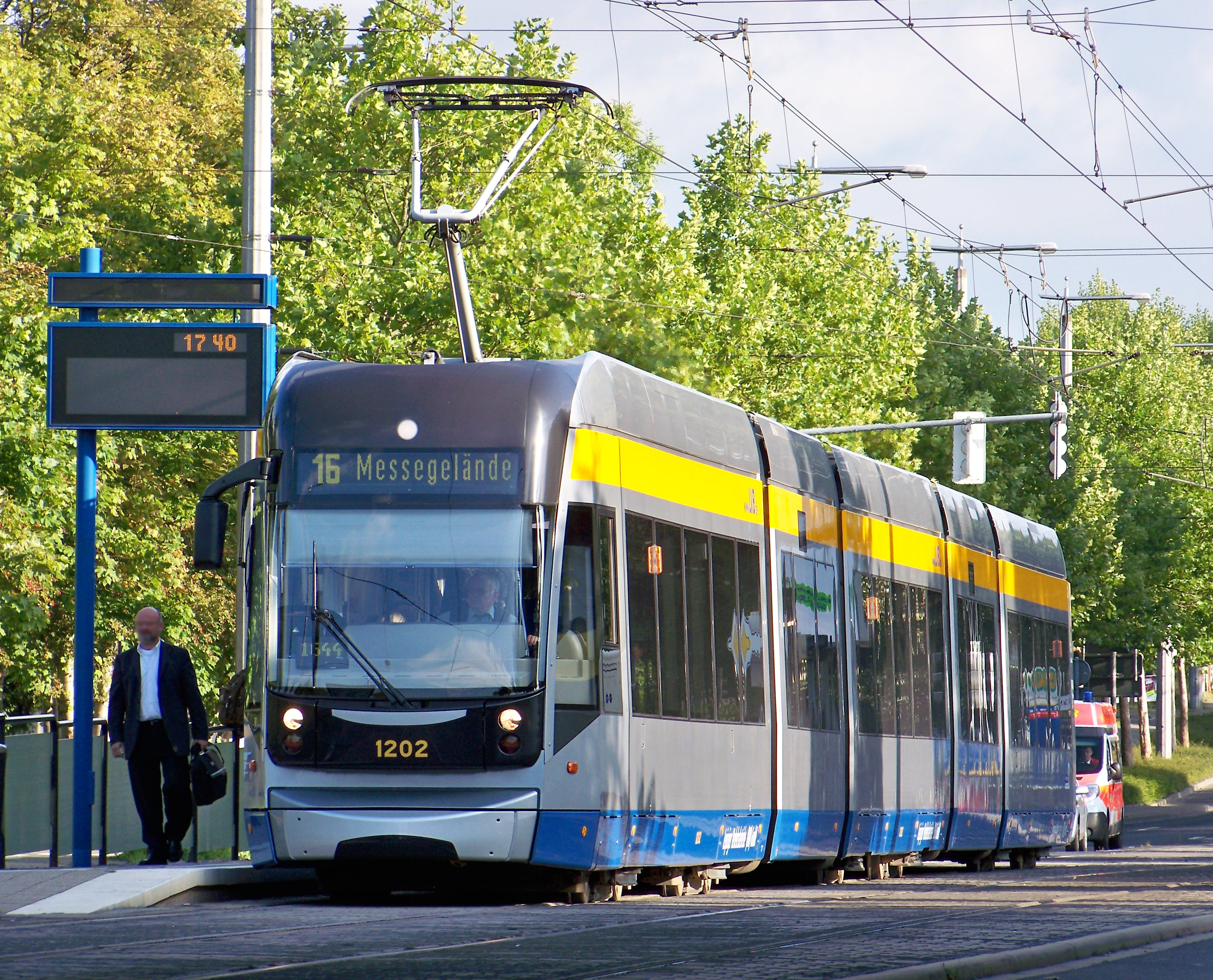
Flexity Classic tram in Leipzig

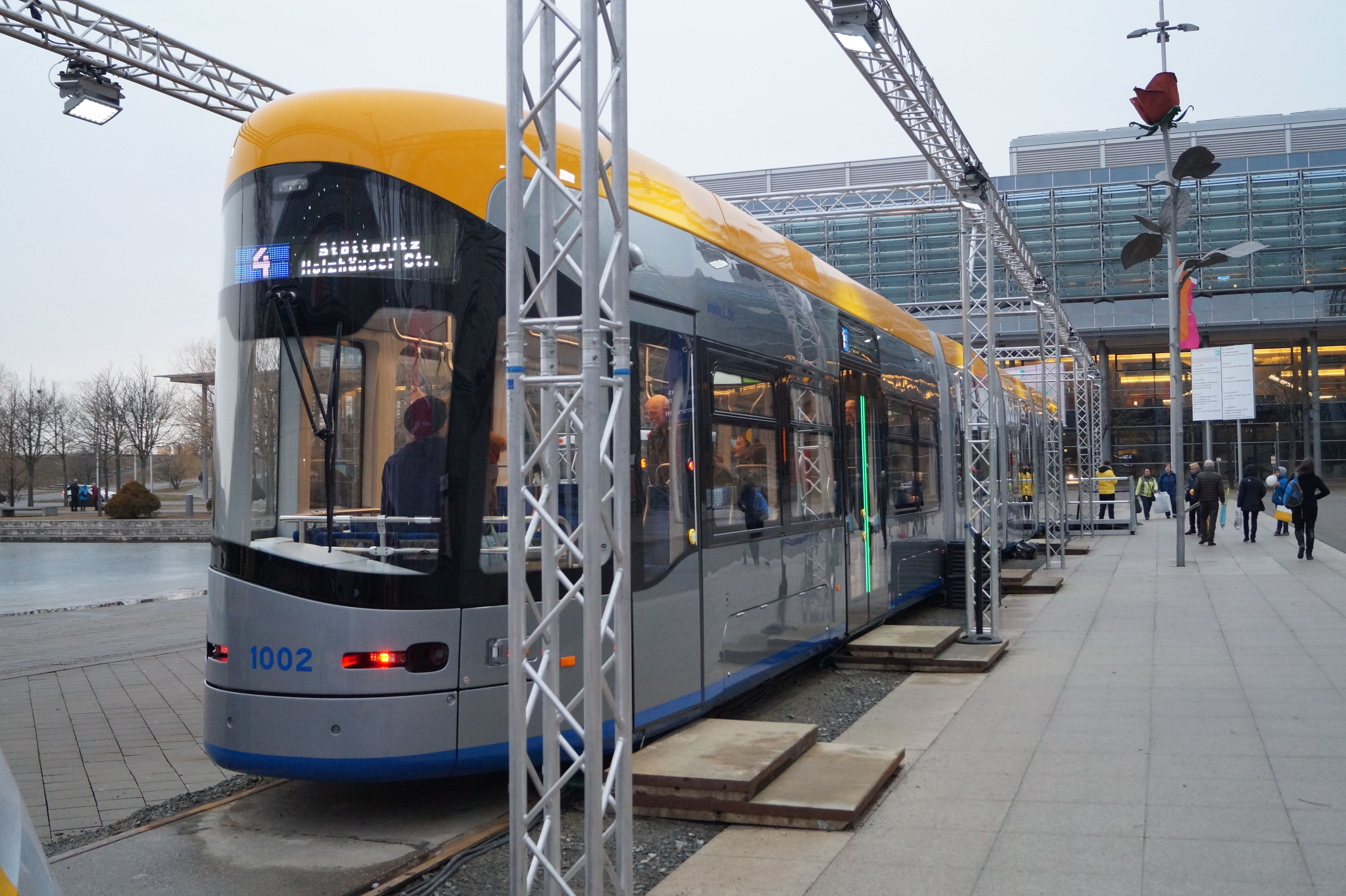
The new Solaris Tramino XL (NGT10) in Leipzig, 2017

== History ==
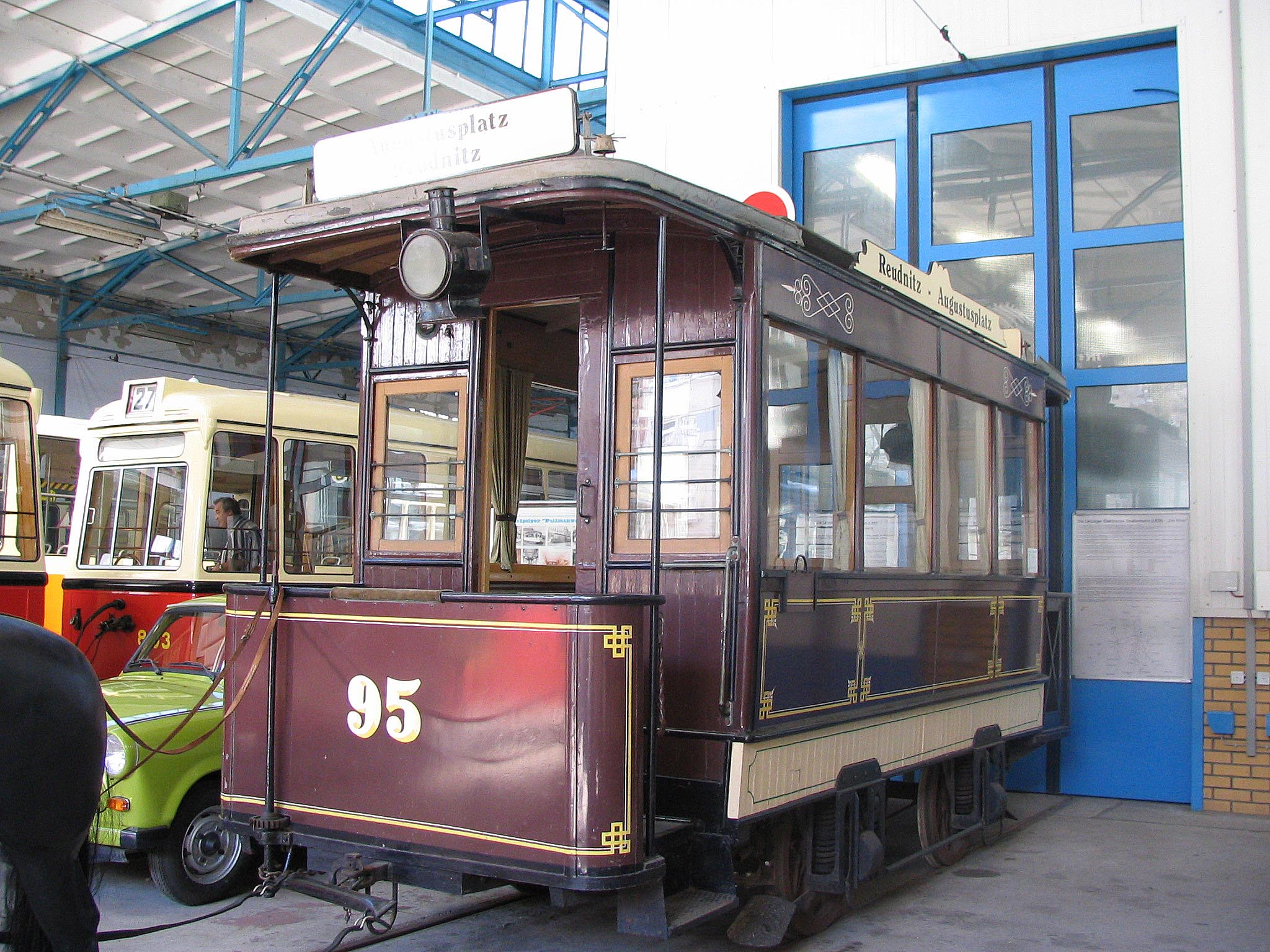
LPE horse tramcar

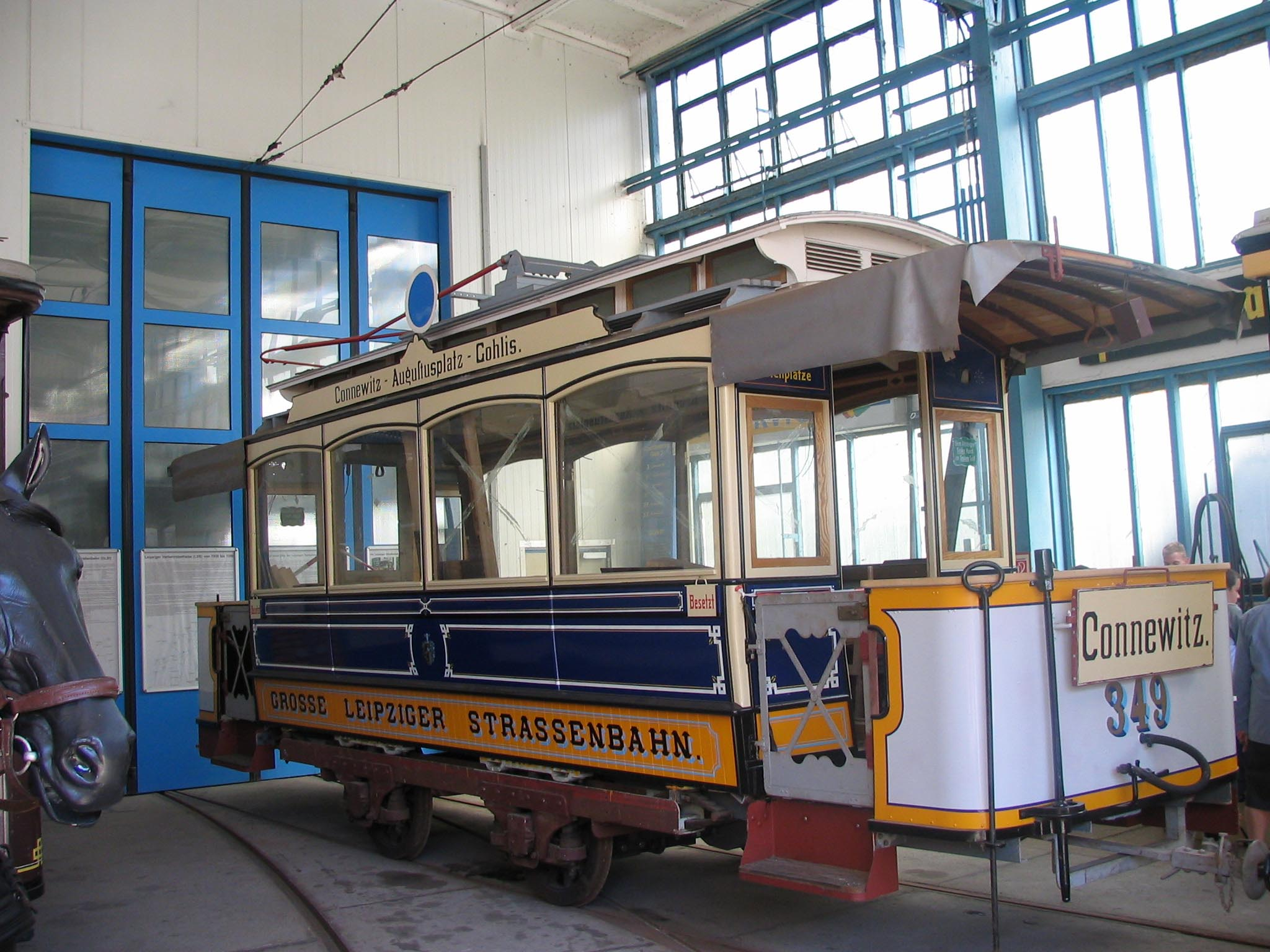
Motor tram number 349

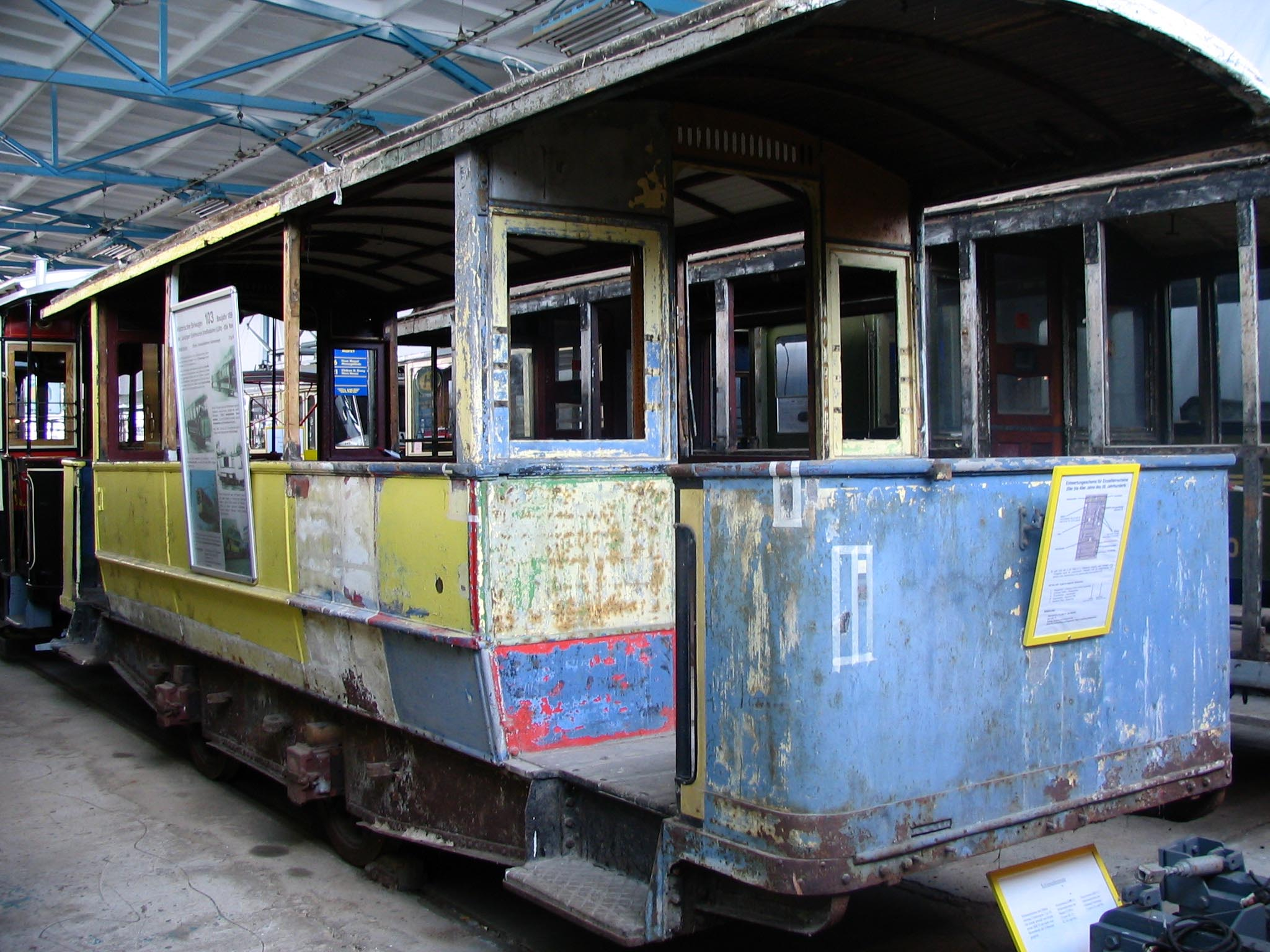
Trailer number 103, built 1896

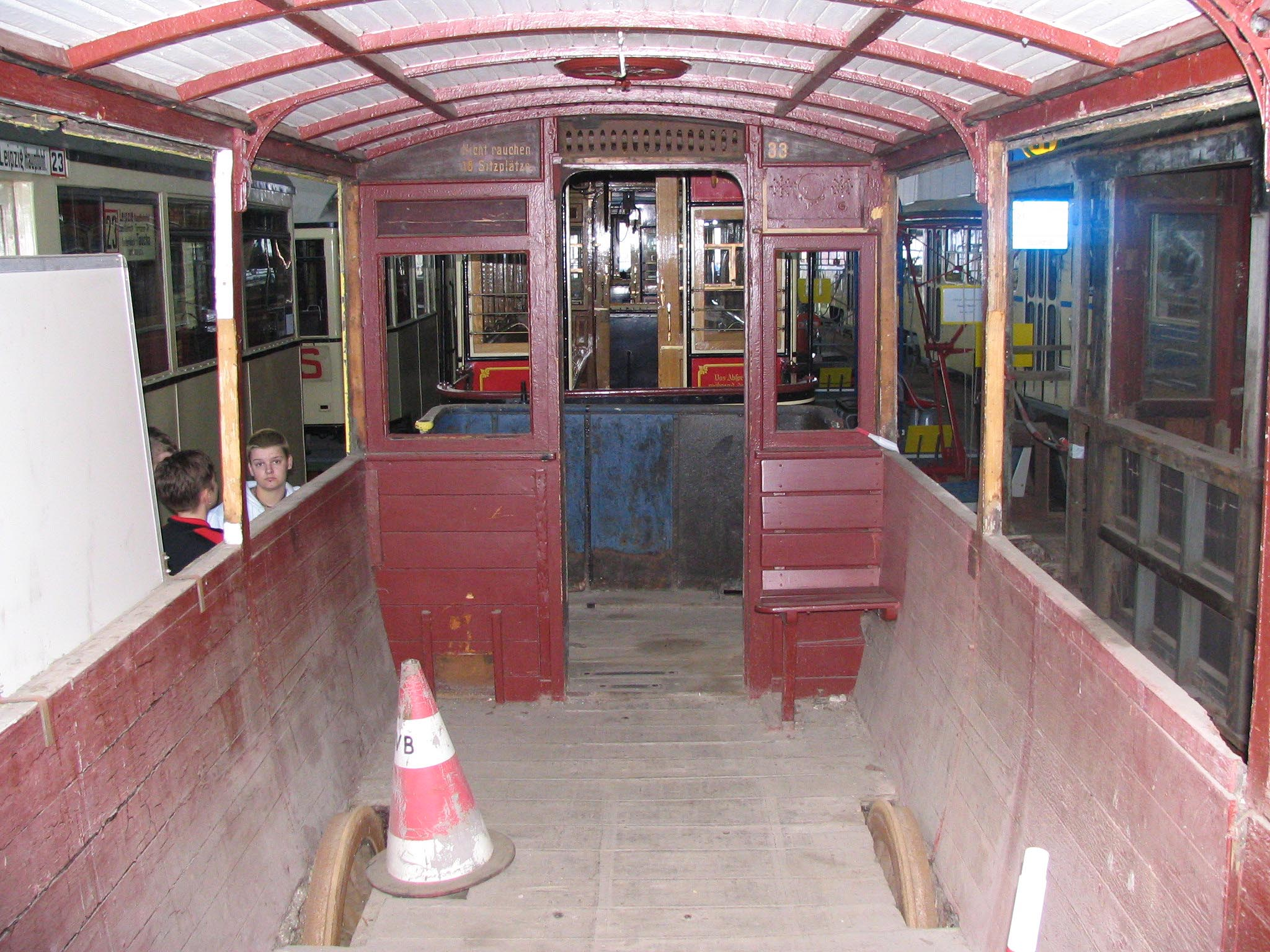
Trailer number 103, interior

On 18 May 1872, the Leipziger Pferdeeisenbahn (LPE, "Leipzig Horse Railway) opened service. The Reudnitz tram depot was the first in Leipzig and the location of the LPE head office. Twenty-five years after opening, the LPE owned 1,013 horses, 172 tramcars and five depots. A competing tramway enterprise, the Leipziger Elektrische Straßenbahn (LESt, "Leipzig Electric Tramway Company") started construction of an electric tramway network in 1895. This prompted the LPE to begin electrification. The Große Leipziger Straßenbahn (GLSt, "Greater Leipzig Tramway Company") organized as the legal successor to the LPE, managed to open the first electric tramway in Leipzig on 17 April 1896. The LESt opened service soon thereafter, on 20 May 1896. To the regret of many residents, the last horse tramway service operated on 16 April 1897.

Suburban lines were developed from 1900, and motorbus services from 1913. After the First World War, the privately owned companies were dissolved and replaced by a municipal undertaking, which operated under the old name Große Leipziger Straßenbahn (GLSt). This was renamed Leipziger Verkehrsbetriebe (LVB, "Leipzig Transport Company") from 1938, incorporating motorbus, trolleybus and taxi services. In 1949, following establishment of the DDR, LVB was integrated with other (formerly private) enterprises taken into state ownership. It became part of the (nationalized) transport undertakings operated as Volkseigener Betrieb Kombinate ("People's Collective Enterprises") in 1970. Following the fall of the DDR, LVB was reorganized as a company with limited liability (GmbH), owned by the Leipzig local authority and the district (Landkreis) of Leipzig.

A detailed overview of the development of the Leipzig tramway, segment by segment, may be found in the article Leipzig Tramway Network History.

=== Historic Tramcars ===
Motor Tram Type 13:

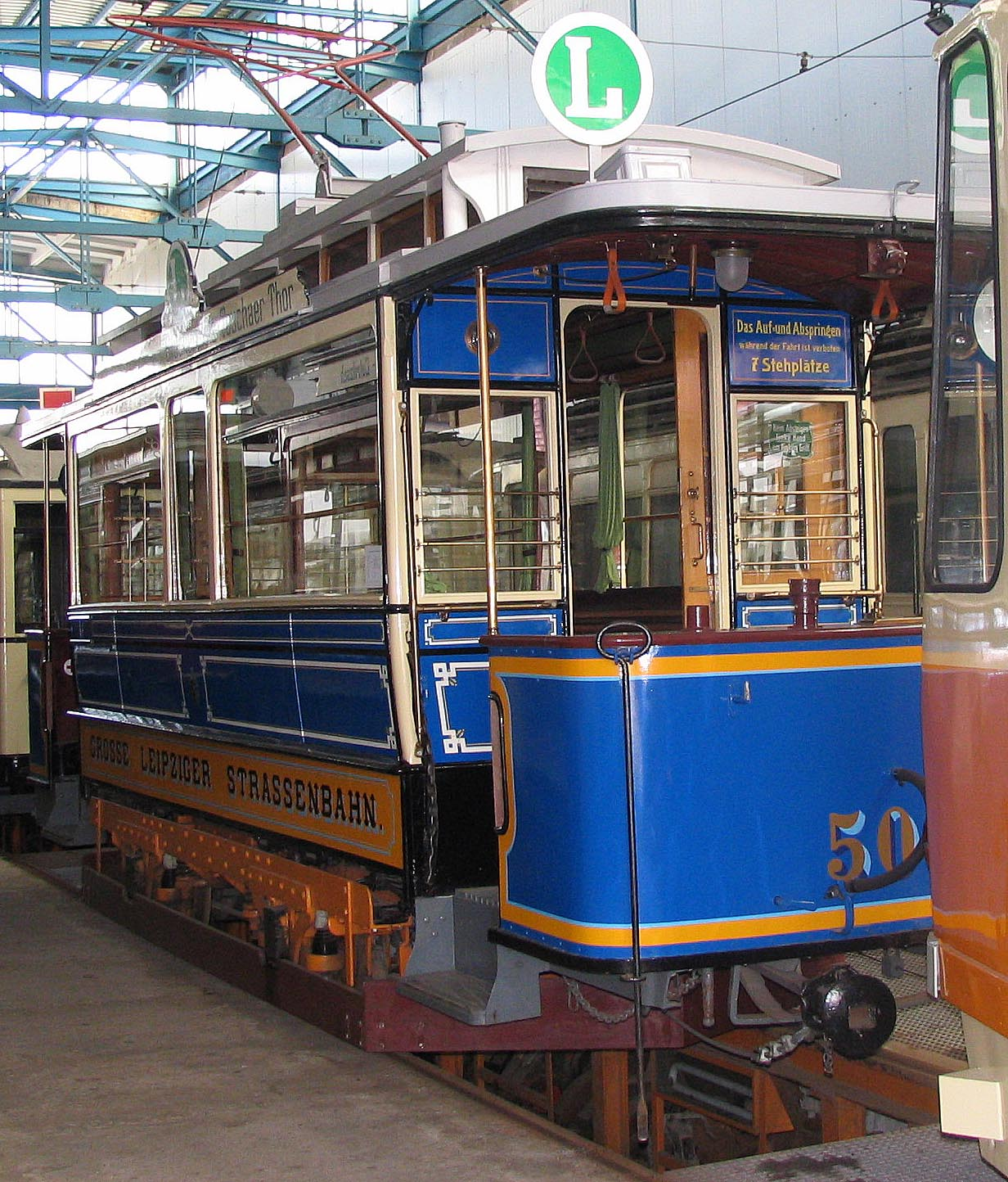
Motor tram Number 500 (Type 13).

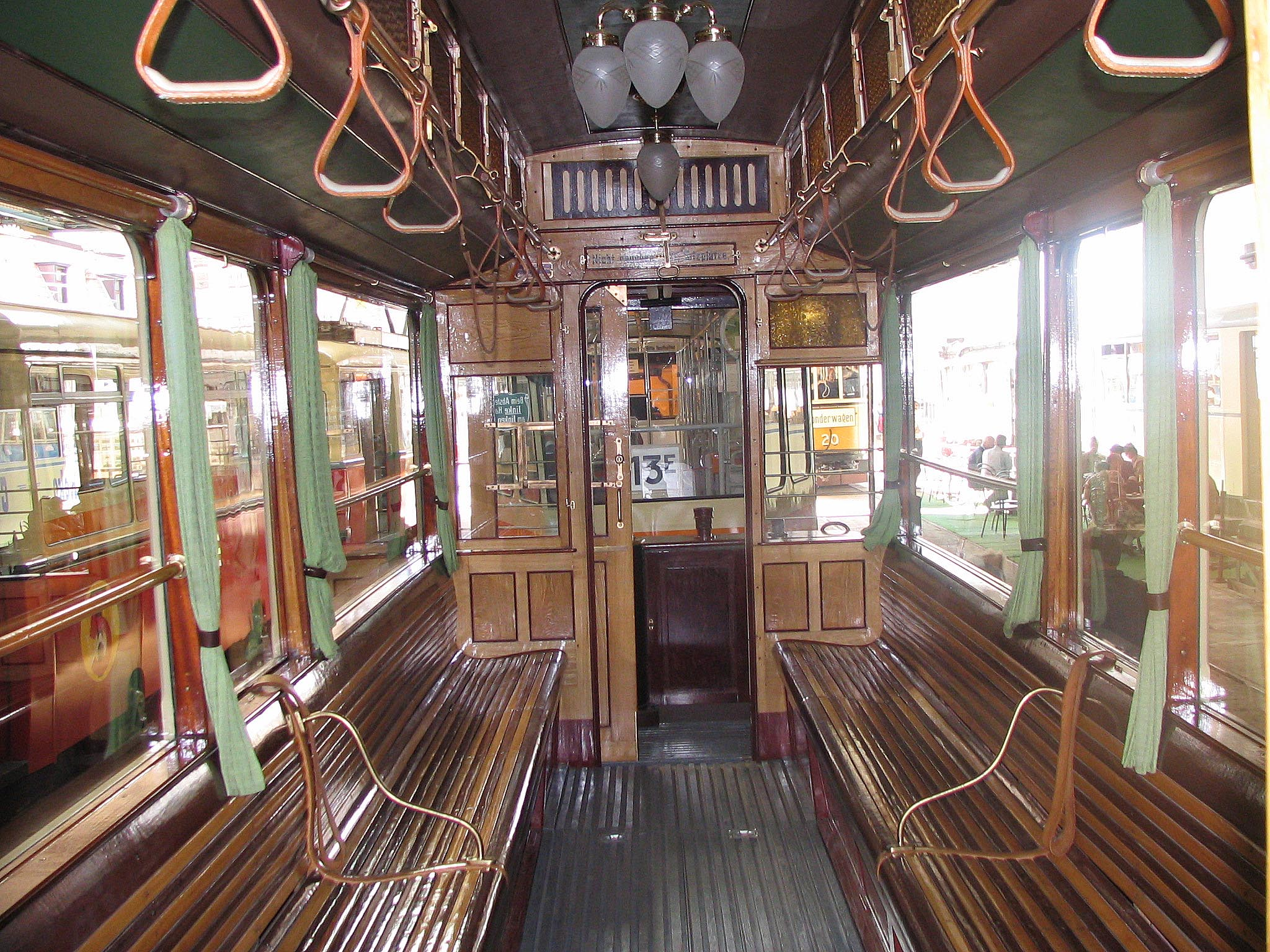
Motor tram Number 500 (Type 13), interior.

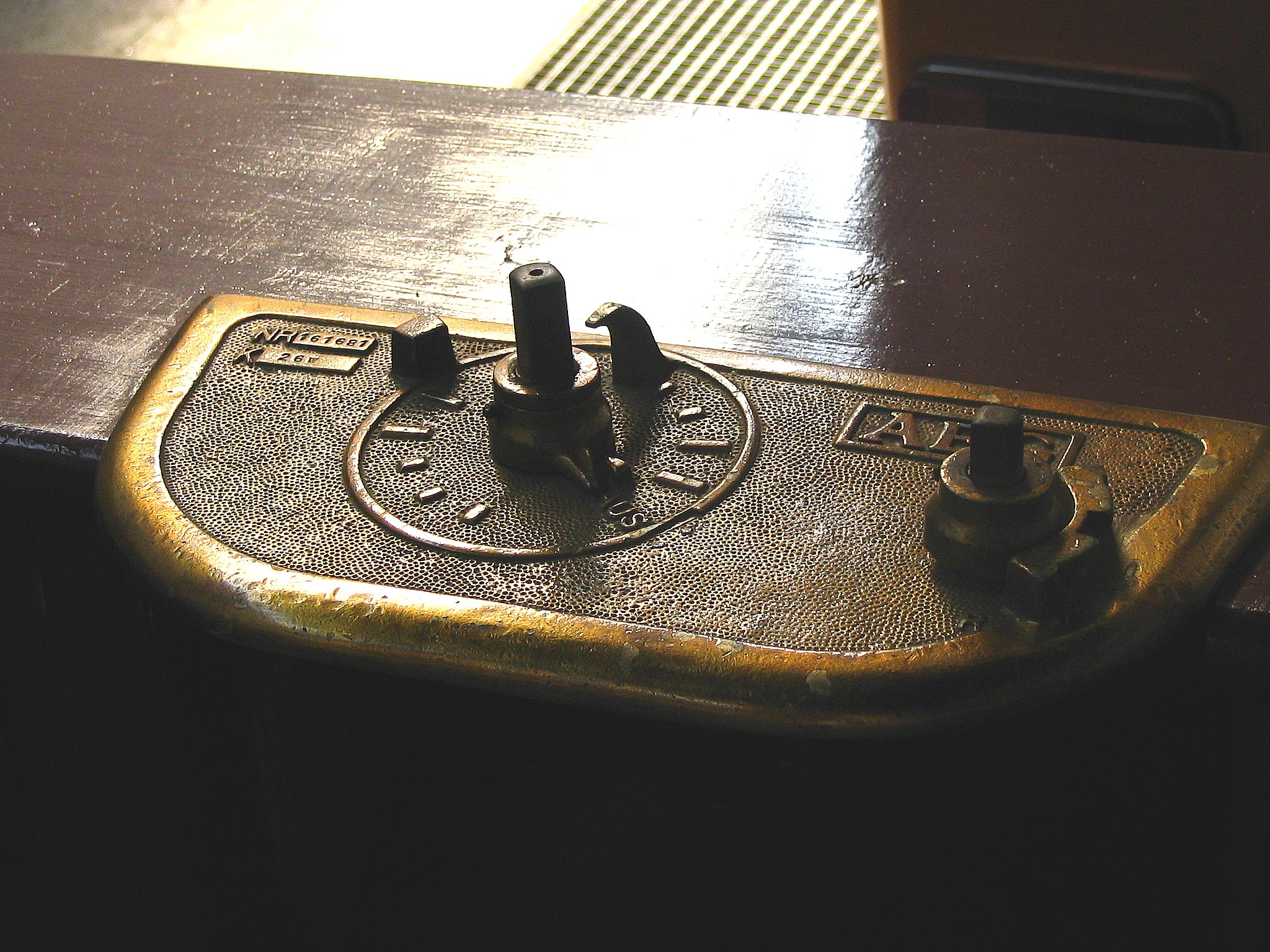
Driving position and controller of Type 13 motor tram.

Technical Data
Series	416–505
In Service	5 November 1906
Builder	GLSt central workshops, Leipzig
Electrical Equipment	AEG / LEW
Controller	Two, Type K26w
Motors	Two, BM 20/600, 16 kW
Brakes	Air, hand

Motor Tram Type 27:

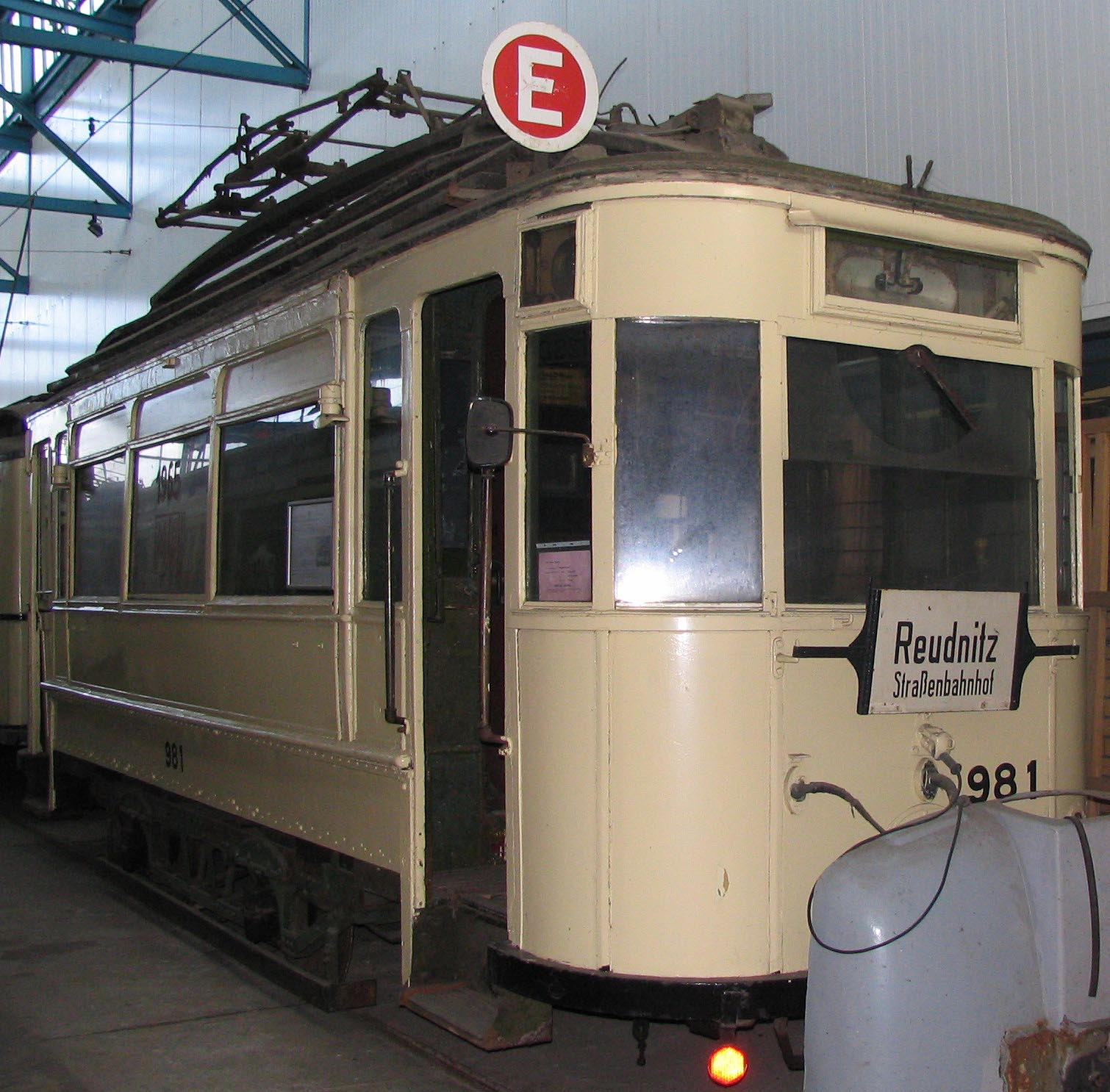
Motor tram number 981 (Type 27).

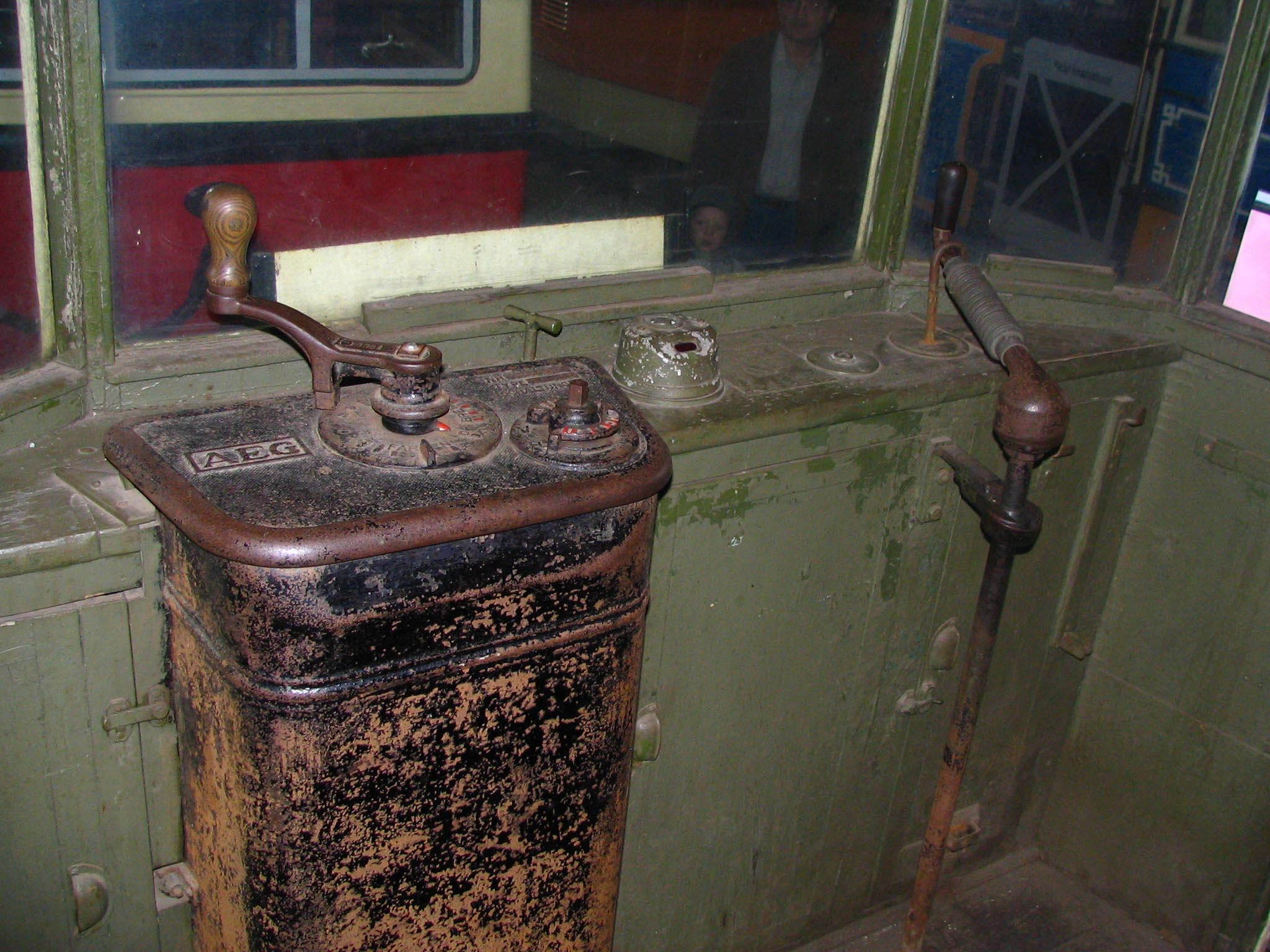
Driving position of Type 27 motor tram.

Technical Data for Motor Tram Number 981
Built	1913/1929
Seats	18 (cross seats)
Standing places	20
Mass	11.9 tonnes
Length	8.86 m
Axlebase (wheelbase)	2 m
Brakes	Air (motor compressor), electric, hand
Controller	Schleifringfahrschalter AEG-FB3sp41
Motors	Two, AEG-USL253a, 34 kW

Motor Tram Type 29:

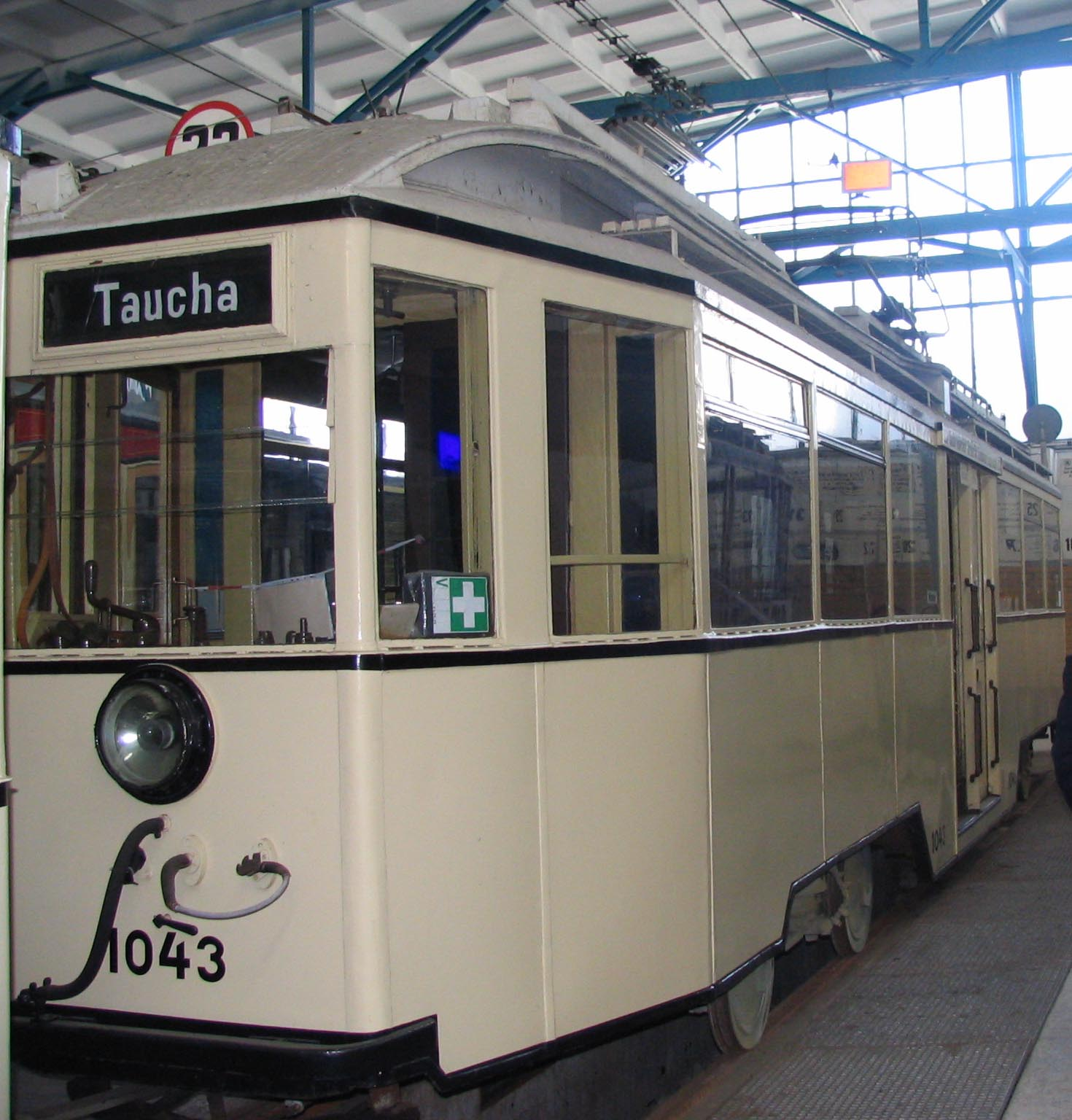
Motor tram number 1043 (Type 29). The bogies are not original.

Technical Data
Series	1001–1056
In Service	18 June 1930
Builder	Linke-Hofmann-Busch AG, Bautzen
Electrical Equipment	Sachsenwerk, Dresden-Niedersedlitz
Controllers	Two, Type SNF
Motors	Four, GBv 237, 45 kW
Brakes	Air, electric, hand, track

Motor Tram Type 30:

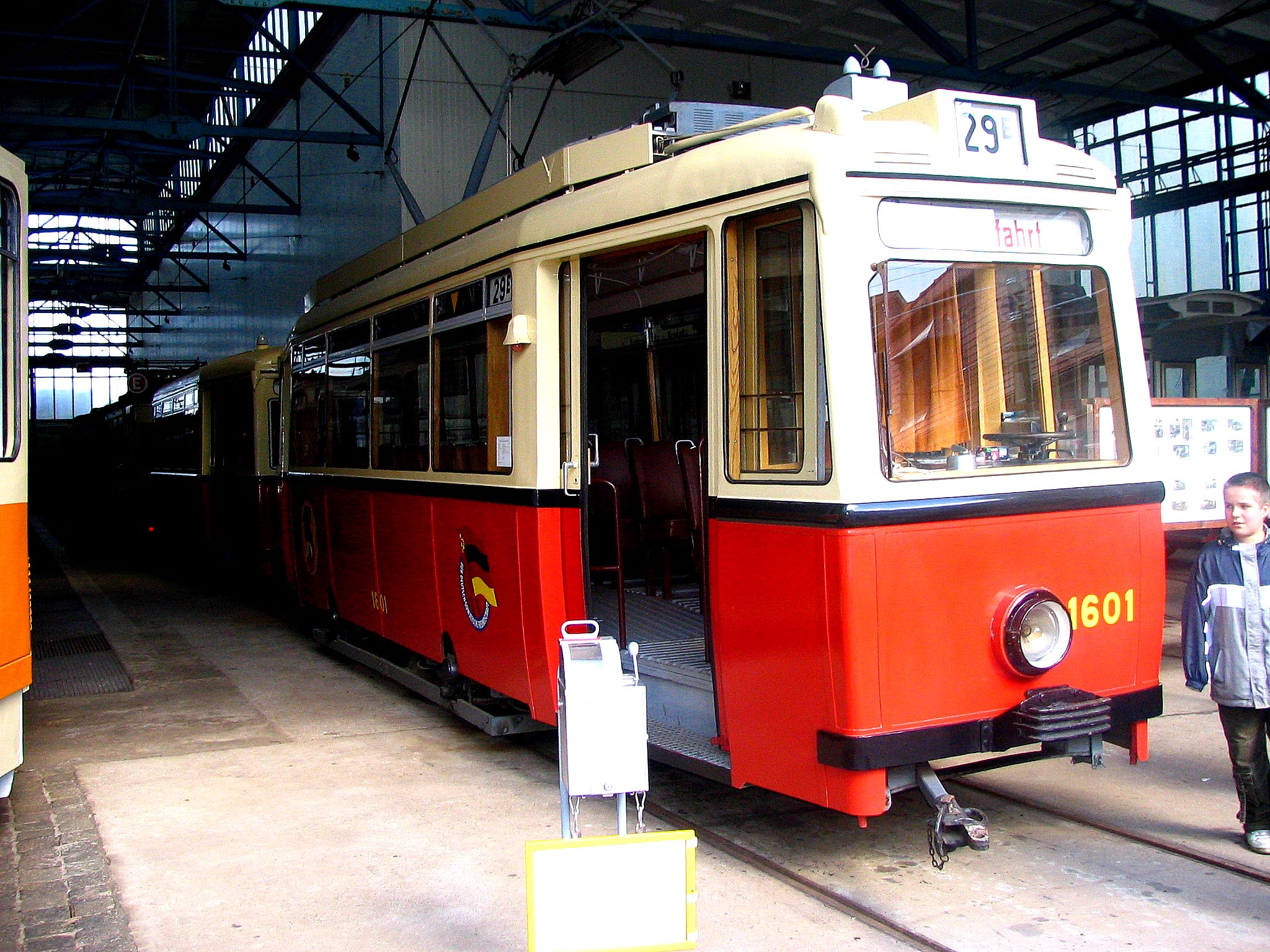
Motor tram number 1601 (Type 30).

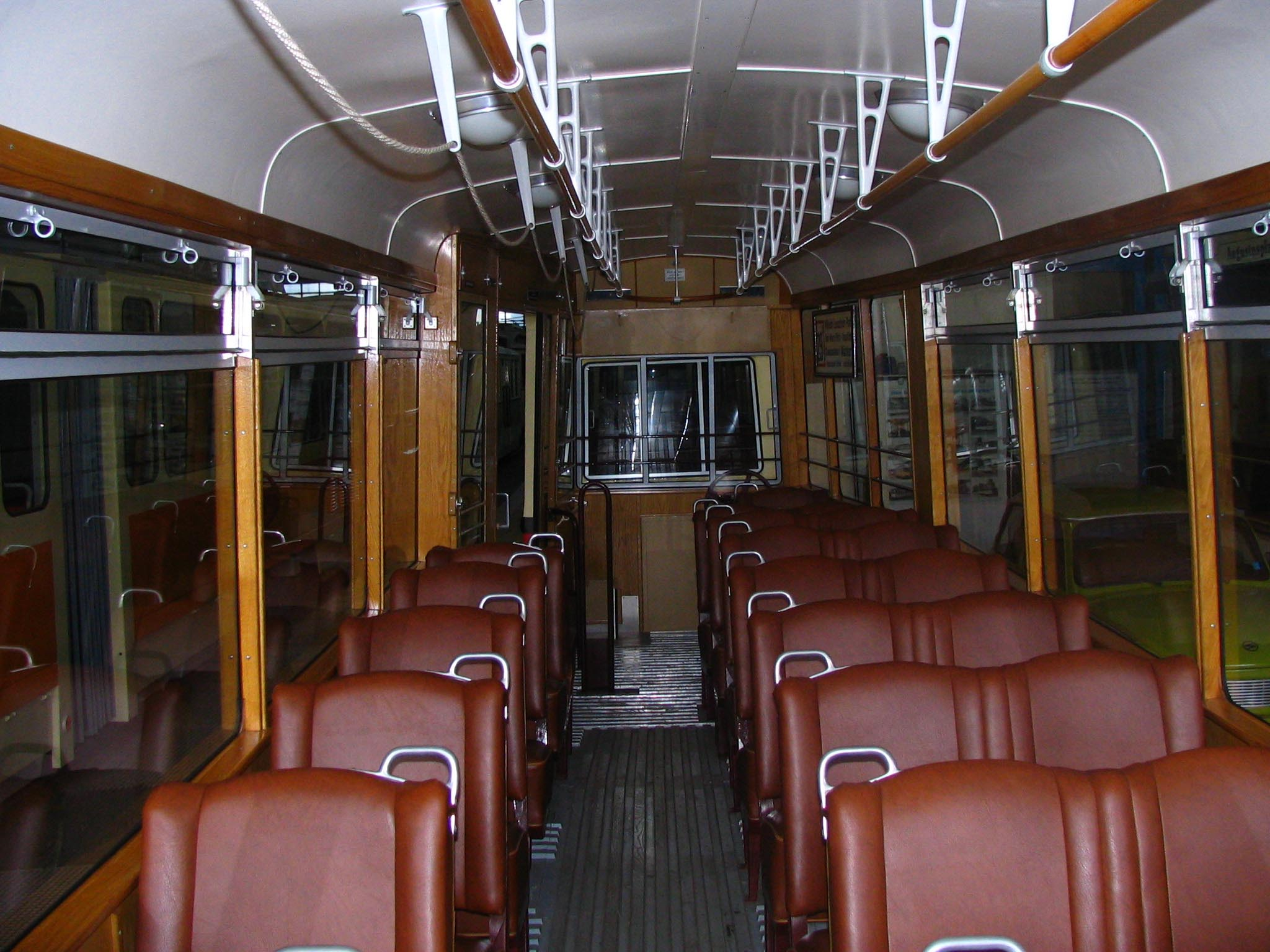
Motor tram number 1601 (Type 30), interior.

Technical Data
Series	1601–1615
In Service	13 October 1951

== See also ==
- Trams in Leipzig
- History of trams in Leipzig
