= 2017–18 Handball-Bundesliga =

Handball-Bundesliga
- Season: 2017–18
- Champions: SG Flensburg-Handewitt
- Relegated: TuS Nettelstedt-Lübbecke; TV Hüttenberg
- Champions League: SG Flensburg-Handewitt; Rhein-Neckar Löwen
- EHF Cup: Füchse Berlin; SC Magdeburg; THW Kiel; TSV Hannover-Burgdorf
- Matches: 306
- Goals: 16,367 (53.49 per match)
- Top goalscorer: Casper Ulrich Mortensen (230 goals)

The 2017–18 Handball-Bundesliga was the 53rd season of the Handball-Bundesliga, Germany's premier handball league and the 41st season consisting of only one league. It ran from 24 August 2017 to 3 June 2018.

SG Flensburg-Handewitt won their second title.

== Teams ==
Locations of the 2017–18 Handball-Bundesliga teams

A total of 18 teams will be participating in this year's edition of the Bundesliga. Of these, 15 sides qualified directly from the 2016–17 season and the top three sides were directly promoted from the 2. Bundesliga: TuS Nettelstedt-Lübbecke, the champions; TV Hüttenberg, the runners-up; and the third-place finisher, Die Eulen Ludwigshafen.

Team	Location	Arena	Capacity
Füchse Berlin	Berlin	Max-Schmeling-Halle	9,000
TVB 1898 Stuttgart	Stuttgart	Scharrena Stuttgart; Porsche-Arena	2,251; 6,211
HC Erlangen	Nuremberg	Arena Nürnberger Versicherung	8,308
SG Flensburg-Handewitt	Flensburg	Flens-Arena	6,300
Die Eulen Ludwigshafen	Ludwigshafen	Friedrich-Ebert-Halle	2,250
Frisch Auf Göppingen	Göppingen	EWS Arena	5,600
VfL Gummersbach	Gummersbach	Schwalbe-Arena; Lanxess Arena	4,132; 19,500
TSV Hannover-Burgdorf	Hannover	TUI Arena; Swiss Life Hall	9,850; 4,150
TV Hüttenberg	Gießen	Sporthalle Gießen-Ost	4,003
THW Kiel	Kiel	Sparkassen-Arena	10,285
SC DHfK Leipzig	Leipzig	Arena Leipzig	6,327
TBV Lemgo	Lemgo	Lipperlandhalle	4,790
TuS Nettelstedt-Lübbecke	Lübbecke	Merkur Arena	3,250
SC Magdeburg	Magdeburg	GETEC Arena	6,800
MT Melsungen	Kassel	Rothenbach-Halle	4,300
GWD Minden	Minden	Kampa-Halle	4,059
Rhein-Neckar Löwen	Mannheim	SAP Arena	13,200
HSG Wetzlar	Wetzlar	Rittal Arena Wetzlar	4,421

== Standings ==
Pos	Team	Pld	W	D	L	GF	GA	GD	Pts	Qualification or relegation
1	SG Flensburg-Handewitt (C)	34	27	2	5	993	851	+142	56	Qualification to Champions League
2	Rhein-Neckar Löwen	34	27	1	6	1043	838	+205	55	Qualification to Champions League
3	Füchse Berlin	34	25	3	6	968	875	+93	53	Qualification to EHF Cup
4	SC Magdeburg	34	24	2	8	1037	927	+110	50	Qualification to EHF Cup
5	THW Kiel	34	24	1	9	989	854	+135	49	Qualification to EHF Cup
6	TSV Hannover-Burgdorf	34	22	3	9	953	900	+53	47	Qualification to EHF Cup
7	MT Melsungen	34	19	3	12	952	887	+65	41	
8	SC DHfK Leipzig	34	17	3	14	867	854	+13	37	
9	TBV Lemgo	34	13	8	13	882	932	−50	34	
10	Frisch Auf Göppingen	34	12	7	15	903	909	−6	31	
11	HSG Wetzlar	34	13	4	17	896	884	+12	30	
12	GWD Minden	34	9	8	17	896	968	−72	26	
13	HC Erlangen	34	8	9	17	844	932	−88	25	
14	TVB 1898 Stuttgart	34	8	4	22	852	959	−107	20	
15	VfL Gummersbach	34	8	0	26	841	950	−109	16	
16	Die Eulen Ludwigshafen	34	6	3	25	828	946	−118	15	
17	TuS Nettelstedt-Lübbecke (R)	34	4	6	24	778	913	−135	14	Relegation to 2. Bundesliga
18	TV Hüttenberg (R)	34	3	7	24	845	988	−143	13	Relegation to 2. Bundesliga

Source: DKB
Rules for classification: 1) points; 2) Goal difference; 3) Goals scored.
(C) Champions; (R) Relegated

== Results ==
Home \ Away	BER	BIT	ERL	FLE	FRI	GÖP	GUM	HAN	HÜT	KIE	LEM	LEI	LÜB	MAG	MEL	MIN	RNL	WET
Füchse Berlin	—	26–24	31–25	26–30	31–24	33–19	31–24	25–24	28–23	25–25	36–23	24–20	26–20	23–23	32–29	40–31	29–23	29–24
TVB 1898 Stuttgart	24–24	—	29–31	28–35	25–22	23–30	22–26	26–33	30–30	24–36	27–28	22–27	28–29	31–32	29–27	27–27	23–29	26–36
HC Erlangen	23–27	25–29	—	20–29	22–22	28–29	25–22	34–28	26–26	20–31	24–28	27–26	22–22	31–29	23–23	26–26	25–25	25–25
SG Flensburg-Handewitt	29–21	28–17	29–21	—	32–29	22–21	34–22	27–27	38–23	27–35	25–22	30–27	37–23	29–24	33–29	24–23	27–22	34–27
Die Eulen Ludwigshafen	19–25	24–25	32–29	24–30	—	25–32	28–24	21–27	32–28	21–25	24–21	21–35	23–23	23–26	27–31	21–21	18–26	31–29
Frisch Auf Göppingen	32–38	21–23	25–28	28–28	32–28	—	24–16	30–19	28–17	22–29	27–27	20–20	24–19	31–32	29–28	27–28	28–26	28–25
VfL Gummersbach	29–31	25–26	24–29	25–29	31–26	28–27	—	29–31	28–25	31–27	30–37	29–24	21–22	22–30	17–25	22–24	26–29	22–33
TSV Hannover-Burgdorf	33–27	27–20	25–19	32–29	33–23	28–28	28–22	—	32–25	28–27	27–25	30–26	28–26	32–30	26–23	36–29	23–26	29–27
TV Hüttenberg	28–30	23–28	24–27	23–30	28–27	28–28	22–23	19–29	—	25–37	24–24	20–24	24–22	31–37	27–28	26–30	23–36	22–22
THW Kiel	25–20	31–25	29–24	25–29	28–21	28–23	29–23	29–31	33–24	—	29–19	29–26	29–19	34–32	32–31	30–27	27–22	25–26
TBV Lemgo	22–25	24–21	24–24	23–32	29–25	29–27	29–27	27–29	31–30	27–31	—	33–29	30–27	27–27	26–26	26–26	24–26	28–26
SC DHfK Leipzig	30–31	24–24	34–24	25–22	23–20	33–28	27–24	25–23	26–25	16–28	26–19	—	26–26	22–23	30–27	20–17	23–29	23–21
TuS Nettelstedt-Lübbecke	21–29	24–21	27–27	24–27	28–29	25–25	26–27	21–25	26–26	21–33	22–25	17–22	—	20–31	19–22	29–22	28–38	17–23
SC Magdeburg	26–30	34–26	28–22	29–23	30–26	30–27	30–24	31–22	33–26	31–26	35–28	37–31	34–24	—	33–31	34–25	29–32	31–29
MT Melsungen	31–24	33–24	32–21	25–30	25–19	27–30	25–23	31–29	26–28	29–25	33–33	28–20	27–16	29–27	—	31–27	29–26	29–22
GWD Minden	29–37	26–29	33–22	30–34	29–26	26–26	29–24	29–29	35–28	25–32	24–24	26–29	21–18	29–41	26–30	—	24–35	26–24
Rhein-Neckar Löwen	37–23	33–23	33–22	32–27	34–26	31–20	36–26	35–23	31–21	30–28	38–17	28–25	36–27	34–29	23–24	27–22	—	34–25
HSG Wetzlar	26–31	29–23	26–23	19–24	30–21	34–27	30–25	29–26	23–23	30–22	23–24	22–23	25–20	27–29	31–28	24–24	24–31	—

Source: DKB
Legend: Blue = home team win; Yellow = draw; Red = away team win.

== Top goalscorers ==
Rank	Player	Team	Goals
1	(Denmark) Casper Ulrich Mortensen	TSV Hannover-Burgdorf	230
2	(Germany) Julius Kühn	MT Melsungen	224
3	(Switzerland) Andy Schmid	Rhein-Neckar Löwen	194
4	(Germany) Marcel Schiller	Frisch Auf Göppingen	189
5	(Germany) Tim Hornke	TBV Lemgo	179
5	(Denmark) Rasmus Lauge Schmidt	SG Flensburg-Handewitt	179
7	(Sweden) Niclas Ekberg	THW Kiel	171
7	(Denmark) Michael Damgaard	SC Magdeburg	171
9	(Denmark) Hans Lindberg	Füchse Berlin	169
9	(Austria) Robert Weber	SC Magdeburg	169
