= Bergischer HC =

German handball club

- Full name: Bergischer Handball-Club 06 e.V.
- Nickname: Die Löwen
- Short name: BHC
- Founded: 2006; 20 years ago
- Arena: Uni-Halle (Wuppertal); Klingenhalle (Solingen); ISS Dome (Düsseldorf)
- Capacity: 3,200; 2,491; 12,500
- President: Jörg Föste
- Head coach: Fabian Gutbrod (interim)
- League: Handball-Bundesliga
- 2025–26: 13th of 18
- Club colours
Home	Away

Bergischer Handball-Club 06 is a German handball club based in the cities of Wuppertal and Solingen that competes in the Handball-Bundesliga.

Location of Bergischer HC

== History ==
The club originates from a 2006 contract between Stefan Adam, then chairman of LTV Wuppertal, and SG Solingen, incorporating the Wuppertal club's management, squad and main sponsor into the Solingen-based club and renaming it to officially represent the entire Bergisches Land region. In 2011, "Die Löwen" were promoted to the Handball-Bundesliga for the first time since their establishment in 2006, though they were relegated in the first season. Bergischer HC reached the DHB-Pokal FINAL4 in the 2015–16 season, but were defeated by SC Magdeburg.

In the 2025-26 season they surprisingly beat SC Magdeburg in the DHB-Pokal semifinal to meet Füchse Berlin. Here they however lost 42-33.

== Accomplishments ==
- 2. Handball-Bundesliga:
  - Gold: 2011, 2013, 2018
- DHB-Pokal:
  - Silver: 2026

== Crest, colours, supporters ==
=== Kit manufacturers ===
Period	Kit manufacturer
–2015	(Germany) Puma
2015–2020	(Sweden) Salming
2020–present	(Germany) Kempa

=== Kits ===
HOME
2010–11	2011–12	2014–15	2015–16	2016–17	2017–18	2018–19	2019–20	2020–21

AWAY
2009–10	2011–12	2015–16	2016–17	2018–19	2019–20	2020–21	2021–22

THIRD

2020–21

== Team ==
=== Current squad ===
Squad for the 2024–25 season

Bergischer HC

Goalkeepers

- 1 (Germany) Christopher Rudeck
- 16 (Germany) Lukas Diedrich

Left wingers

- 2 (Germany) Noah Beyer
- 20 (Egypt) Belal Ibrahim Massoud

Right wingers

- 18 (Germany) Yannick Fraatz
- 46 (Germany) Julian Fuchs

Line players

- 22 (Iceland) Tjörvi Tyr Gislason
- 23 (Germany) Joshua Thiele
- 49 (Germany) Aron Seesing

Left backs

- 13 (Finland) Robin Granlund
- 14 (Lithuania) Gerdas Babarskas
- (Germany) Sören Servos

Centre Backs

- 19 (Czech Republic) Tomáš Babák
- 33 (Germany) Eloy Morante Maldonado

Right backs

- 4 (Germany) Elias Scholtes
- 11 (Germany) Djibril M’Bengue
- 77 (Germany) Johannes Wasielewski

=== Technical staff ===
- Head coach: (Germany) Fabian Gutbrod (interim)
- Assistant coach:
- Assistant coach:
- Goalkeeping coach: (Iceland) Björgvin Páll Gústavsson
- Athletic Trainer: (Germany) Oliver Schuhmacher
- Physiotherapist: (Germany) Severin Feldmann
- Club Doctor: (Germany) Dr. Diederich von der Heyde

=== Transfers ===
Transfers for the 2026–27 season

Joining

- (Portugal) Gabriel Viana (LW) from (Germany) TuS Ferndorf
- (Denmark) Kristian van der Merwe (GK) from (Germany) HSG Nordhorn-Lingen
- (Sweden) Tim Hilding (CB) from (Sweden) HK Malmö
- (Sweden) Zeb Bjerneld (RB) from (Germany) HG Saarlouis
- (Germany) Tom Bergner (LP) from (Germany) GWD Minden
- (Germany) Janik Schrader (RB) from (Germany) VfL Lübeck-Schwartau

Leaving

- (Egypt) Belal Ibrahim Massoud (LW) to (Egypt) Zamalek SC
- (Germany) Aron Seesing (LP) to (Germany) Rhein-Neckar Löwen
- (Germany) Noah Beyer (LW) to (Germany) HSV Hamburg
- (Germany) Eloy Morante Maldonado (CB) to (Germany) HC Erlangen
- (Germany) Elias Scholtes (RB) to (Germany) ThSV Eisenach
- (Germany) Lukas Diedrich (GK) to (Germany) TUSEM Essen
- (Germany) Kim Voss-Fels (RB) to (Germany) SG Menden Sauerland Wölfe
- (Germany) Joshua Thiele (LP) to (Germany) TuS Vinnhorst

=== Transfer History ===
Transfers for the 2025–26 season

Joining

- (Netherlands) Lars Kooij (LP) from (North Macedonia) RK Vardar
- (Germany) Nico Schöttle (LB) from (Germany) TVB Stuttgart
- (Germany) Sören Steinhaus (CB) back from loan at (Germany) TSV Bayer Dormagen
- (Germany) Kim Voss-Fels (RB) from (Germany) VfL Eintracht Hagen
- (Germany) Fynn Hangstein (CB) from (Germany) ThSV Eisenach

Leaving

- (Iceland) Työrvi Týr Gislason (LP) to (Germany) HC Oppenweiler/Backnang
- (Germany) Djibril M’Bengue (RB) to (Germany) SG BBM Bietigheim
- (Iceland) Arnór Viðarsson (LB) loan back to (Denmark) Fredericia HK
- (Finland) Robin Granlund (LB) to (Austria) UHK Krems

Transfers for the 2024–25 season

Joining

- (Egypt) Belal Ibrahim Massoud (LW) from (Egypt) Al Ahly SC
- (Germany) Johannes Wasielewski (RB) from (Germany) HSG Nordhorn-Lingen
- (Germany) Lukas Diedrich (GK) from (Germany) TUSEM Essen
- (Iceland) Tjörvi Tyr Gislason (LP) from (Iceland) Valur
- (Germany) Joshua Thiele (LP) from (Germany) 1. VfL Potsdam
- (Finland) Robin Granlund (LB) from (Sweden) Eskilstuna Guif
- (Lithuania) Gerdas Babarskas (LB) from (France) PAUC Handball
- (Germany) Julian Fuchs (RW) from (Germany) HSG Wetzlar
- (Germany) Sören Steinhaus (CB) from (Germany) TSV Bayer Dormagen

Leaving

- (Sweden) Peter Johannesson (GK) to (Denmark) GOG Håndbold
- (Sweden) Isak Persson (RW) to (Germany) SC Magdeburg
- (Sweden) Linus Arnesson (LB) to (Denmark) HØJ Elite
- (Norway) Tom Kåre Nikolaisen (LP) to (Denmark) HØJ Elite
- (Denmark) Mads Kjeldgaard Andersen (LB) to (Denmark) Fredericia HK
- (Denmark) Frederik Ladefoged (LP) to (Romania) Dinamo București
- (Poland) Antoni Doniecki (LP) to Fenix Toulouse
- (Germany) Tim Nothdurft (LW) to (Germany) Rhein-Neckar Löwen
- (Germany) Tobias Schmitz (LW) to (Germany) TuS Opladen
- (Germany) Alexander Weck (LB) to (Germany) GWD Minden
- (Germany) Lukas Stutzke (LB) to (Germany) TSV Hannover-Burgdorf
- (Germany) Aaron Exner (CB) to (Germany) Bergische Panther
- (Germany) Tom Bergner (LP) to (Germany) GWD Minden
- (Germany) Sören Steinhaus (CB) on loan at (Germany) TSV Bayer Dormagen

== Previous squads ==
2013–2014 Team
Shirt No	Nationality	Player	Birth Date	Position
1	Iceland	Björgvin Páll Gústavsson	24 May 1985 (age 41)	Goalkeeper
4	Germany	Christian Hosse	10 September 1988 (age 38)	Left Winger
5	Austria	Maximilian Hermann	10 December 1991 (age 34)	Right Back
7	Croatia	Stanko Sabljić	28 January 1988 (age 38)	Line Player
8	Germany	Michael Hegemann	29 March 1977 (age 49)	Left Back
11	Iceland	Arnór Þór Gunnarsson	23 October 1987 (age 38)	Right Winger
12	Germany	Mario Huhnstock	11 April 1986 (age 40)	Goalkeeper
13	Germany	Kristian Nippes	11 February 1988 (age 38)	Right Back
15	Germany	Alexander Oelze	28 November 1983 (age 42)	Central Back
17	Germany	Jan Artmann	23 May 1991 (age 35)	Left Winger
18	Austria	Richard Wöss	10 October 1986 (age 40)	Right Winger
19	Germany	Maximilian Weiss	19 October 1988 (age 38)	Line Player
20	Germany	Fabian Böhm	24 June 1989 (age 37)	Left Back
21	Germany	David Ferne	16 March 1994 (age 32)	Goalkeeper
22	Germany	Fabian Gutbrod	1 July 1988 (age 38)	Left Back
23	AustriaHungary	Viktor Szilágyi	16 September 1978 (age 48)	Central Back
24	Germany	Max Adams	14 September 1994 (age 32)	Right Winger
28	Germany	Moritz Barwitzki	10 October 1994 (age 32)	Left Winger
29	Sweden	Emil Berggren	3 August 1986 (age 40)	Left Back
31	Germany	Benjamin Meschke	12 January 1991 (age 35)	Line Player

2011–2012 Team
Shirt No	Nationality	Player	Birth Date	Position
1	Czech Republic	Jan Štochl	3 February 1975 (age 51)	Goalkeeper
3	Germany	Jan–Marco Behr	9 February 1988 (age 38)	Left Back
4	Germany	Christian Hosse	10 September 1988 (age 38)	Left Winger
5	Czech Republic	Jiří Vítek	14 May 1977 (age 49)	Right Back
7	Norway	Kenneth Klev	15 October 1978 (age 48)	Left Back
10	Norway	Kristoffer Kleven Moen	7 September 1980 (age 46)	Central Back
12	Germany	Mario Huhnstock	11 April 1986 (age 40)	Goalkeeper
13	Germany	Kristian Nippes	11 February 1988 (age 38)	Right Back
15	Germany	Alexander Oelze	28 November 1983 (age 42)	Central Back
17	Germany	Maximilian Weiss	19 October 1988 (age 38)	Line Player
18	Austria	Richard Wöss	10 October 1986 (age 40)	Right Winger
19	Germany	Jens Reinarz	19 June 1982 (age 44)	Left Winger
20	Germany	Fabian Böhm	24 June 1989 (age 37)	Left Back
21	Germany	Robin Teppich	3 March 1989 (age 37)	Left Winger
22	Denmark	Henrik Knudsen	6 March 1982 (age 44)	Central Back
23	Germany	Hendrik Pekeler	2 July 1991 (age 35)	Line Player
24	Iceland	Rúnar Kárason	25 April 1988 (age 38)	Right Back
30	Spain	Carlos Prieto	2 February 1980 (age 46)	Line Player

== EHF ranking ==
As of 22 October 2026

Rank	Team	Points
126	(Italy) Cassano Magnago	34
127	(Israel) Maccabi Tel Aviv	32
128	(Germany) Bergischer HC	31
129	(North Macedonia) GRK Tikveš	31
130	(Netherlands) HV. KRAS/Volendam	30
131	(Austria) roomz JAGS Vöslau	30
132	(Austria) Sparkasse Schwaz Handball Tirol	30

== Former club members ==
=== Notable former players ===
- (Germany) Fabian Böhm (2011–2012)
- (Germany) Fabian Gutbrod (2013–)
- (Germany) Chrischa Hannawald (2008–2009)
- (Germany) Michael Hegemann (2012–2014)
- (Germany) Hendrik Pekeler (2010–2012)
- (Germany) Moritz Preuss (2014–2017)
- (Germany) Christopher Rudeck (2015–)
- (Germany) David Schmidt (2020–)
- (Germany) Lukas Stutzke (2019–)
- (Germany) Patrick Wiencek (2007–2008)
- (Austria) Alexander Hermann (2015–2017)
- (Austria) Maximilian Hermann (2013–2017)
- (Austria) (Hungary) Viktor Szilágyi (2012–2017)
- (Austria) Richard Wöss (2011–2014)
- (Croatia) Duje Miljak (2013–2014)
- (Croatia) Stanko Sabljić (2012–2014)
- (Czech Republic) Tomáš Babák (2016–)
- (Czech Republic) Milan Kotrč (2017–2019)
- (Czech Republic) Tomáš Mrkva (2019–2022)
- (Czech Republic) Leoš Petrovský (2017–2020)
- (Czech Republic) Jan Štochl (2009–2013)
- (Czech Republic) Jiří Vítek (2007–2013)
- (Denmark) Henrik Knudsen (2011–2012)
- (France) Ivan Zoubkoff (2006–2009)
- (Hungary) (Serbia) Uroš Vilovski (2016–2017)
- (Iran) Pouya Norouzi Nezhad (2017)
- (Iceland) Arnór Þór Gunnarsson (2012–)
- (Iceland) Björgvin Páll Gústavsson (2013–2017)
- (Iceland) Ragnar Jóhannsson (2019–2020)
- (Iceland) Rúnar Kárason (2011–2012)
- (North Macedonia) Aco Jonovski (2015–2017)
- (Netherlands) Jeffrey Boomhouwer (2018–2022)
- (Netherlands) Joey Duin (2008–2010)
- (Norway) Kenneth Klev (2008–2012)
- (Norway) Tom Kåre Nikolaisen (2020–)
- (Poland) Maciej Majdziński (2016–)
- (Romania) Bogdan Criciotoiu (2016–2019)
- (Russia) Inal Aflitulin (2015–2016)
- (Russia) Igor Chumak (2007)
- (Spain) Rafael Baena González (2018–2020)
- (Spain) Carlos Prieto (2012)
- (Serbia) Miloš Dragaš (2014–2015)
- (Slovakia) Csaba Szücs (2017–)
- (Sweden) Linus Arnesson (2017–)
- (Sweden) Emil Berggren (2012–2014)
- (Sweden) Max Darj (2017–2022)
- (Sweden) Emil Hansson (2021–2022)
- (Sweden) Peter Johannesson (2022–)
- (Sweden) Isak Persson (2022–)

=== Former coaches ===
Seasons	Coach	Country
2009–2012	Hans-Dieter Schmitz	(Germany)
2012–2022	Sebastian Hinze	(Germany)
