= Csaba Szucs =

Csaba Szucs may refer to:

- Csaba Szűcs (born 1965), Hungarian long-distance runner
- Csaba Szücs (born 1987), Slovak handball player
