= Tomáš Babák =

Czech handball player

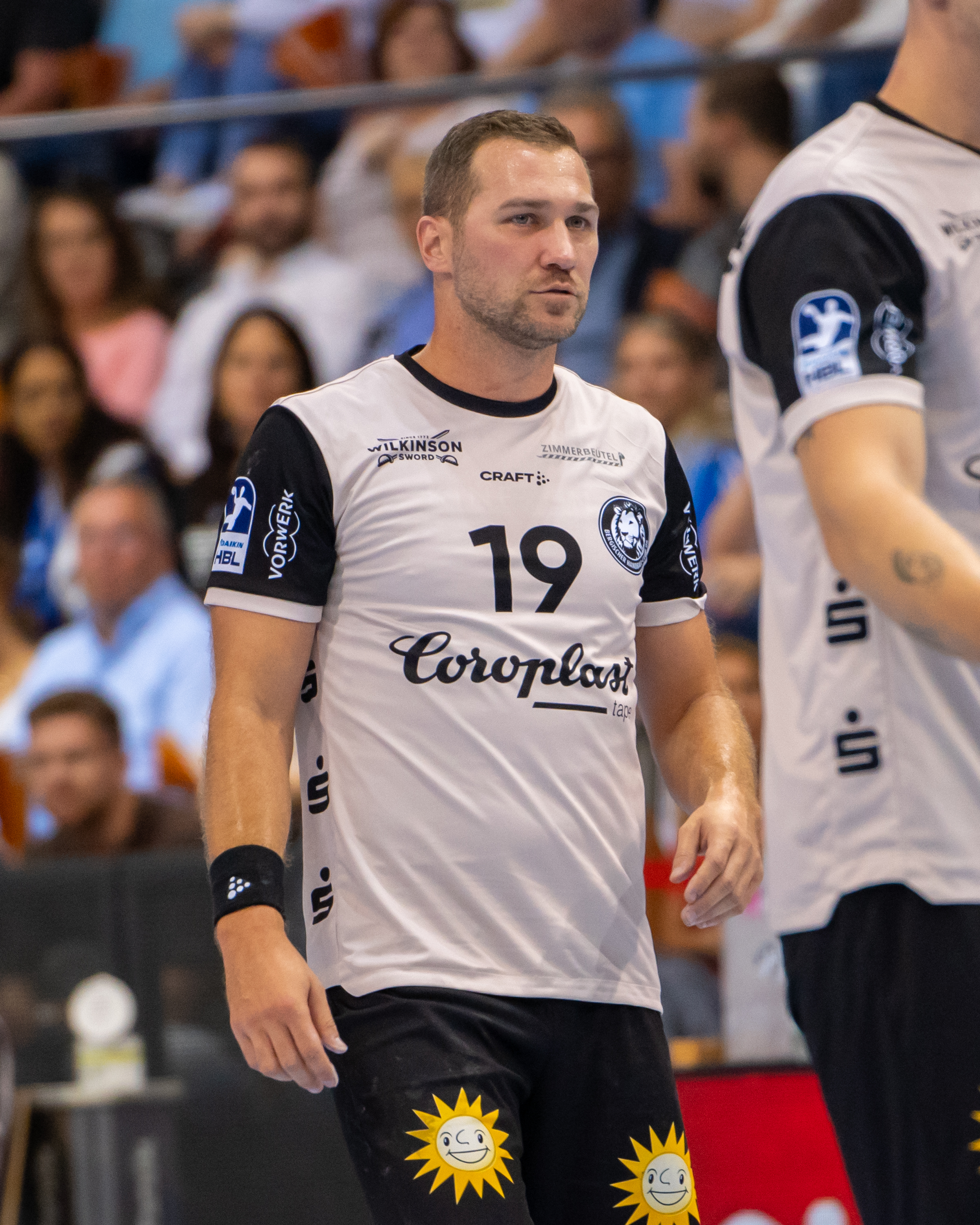

Personal information
- Nationality: Czech
- Born: 28 December 1993 (age 32) Jilemnice, Czech Republic
- Height: 1.86 m (6 ft 1 in)

Sport
- Sport: Handball
- Position: Centre back
- Current club: Bergischer HC
- Number: 19

Youth career
- Years: Team
- –: HBC Ronal Jičín

Senior clubs
- Years: Team
- 2010-2013: HBC Ronal Jičín
- 2013-2016: TSV St. Otmar St. Gallen
- 2016-: Bergischer HC
National team
Years	Team	Apps	(Gls)
2013-	Czech Republic	103	(294)
- Updated on 28 January 2025

Tomáš Babák (born 28 December 1993) is a Czech handball player for Bergischer HC and the Czech national team.
