= Valter Chrintz =

Swedish handball player (born 2000)

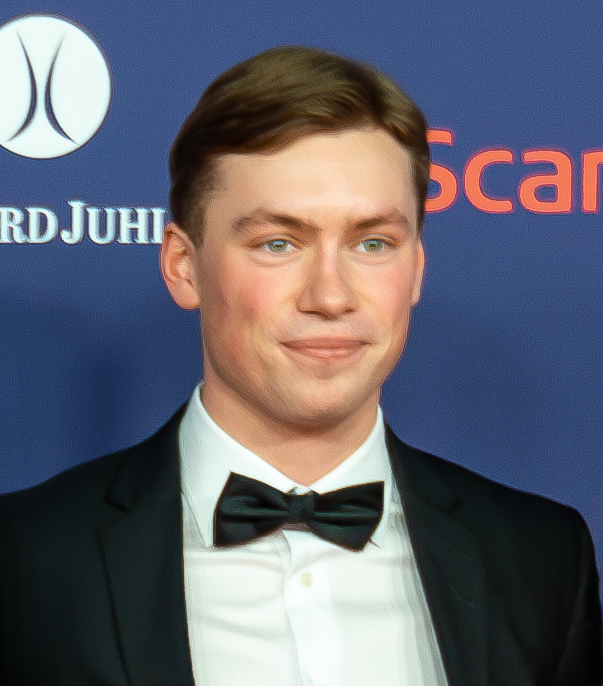

Personal information
- Nationality: Swedish
- Born: 26 April 2000 (age 26) Kristianstad, Sweden
- Height: 1.85 m (6 ft 1 in)

Sport
- Sport: Handball
- Position: Right wing
- Current club: HØJ Elite
- Number: 26

Youth career
- Years: Team
- –2012: Åhus Handboll
- 2012–2017: IFK Kristianstad

Senior clubs
- Years: Team
- 2017–2020: IFK Kristianstad
- 2020–2026: Füchse Berlin
- 2024: → 1. VfL Potsdam (loan)
- 2026–: HØJ Elite
National team
Years	Team	Apps	(Gls)
2019–	Sweden	34	(60)
Medal record
World Championship
Silver medal – second place	2021 Egypt
European Championship
Gold medal – first place	2022 Hungary/Slovakia

Valter Chrintz (born 26 April 2000) is a Swedish handball player for HØJ Elite and the Swedish national team.

He made his international debut on the Swedish national team on 12 March 2019.

He participated at the 2020 European Championship in Sweden, and the 2021 World Championship in Egypt. At the 2022 European Championship he won gold medals with Sweden.

With Füchse he won the 2024-25 Handball-Bundesliga, which was the first in club history. The same season he played in the 2024-25 EHF Champions League final, where Füchse lost to league rivals SC Magdeburg.

== Achievements ==
- Swedish Champion with IFK Kristianstad
  - Winner: 2018
  - Bronze Medalist: 2019
- EHF European League with Füchse Berlin
  - Winner: 2023
  - Silver Medalist: 2021
- Handball-Bundesliga:
  - Winner: 2024-25
- EHF Champions League:
  - Silver Medalist: 2024-25
