= Maciej Majdziński =

Polish handball player (born 1996)

Personal information
- Nationality: Polish
- Born: 8 April 1996 (age 30) Kwidzyn, Poland
- Height: 1.89 m (6 ft 2 in)

Sport
- Sport: Handball
- Position: Right back

Youth career
- Years: Team
- –2012: MTS Kwidzyn

Senior clubs
- Years: Team
- 2012–2015: SMS Gdańsk
- 2015–2016: HSV Hamburg
- 2016–2022: Bergischer HC
National team
Years	Team	Apps	(Gls)
2015–2022	Poland	16	(22)

Maciej Majdziński (born 8 April 1996) is a Polish former handball player who last played for Bergischer HC. He featured in the Polish national team.

== Career ==
He debuted on the national team on 7 November 2015, in a friendly match against Russia (27:21). He threw his first goal on 24 October 2018, in a match against Kosovo (37:13).

He represented Poland at the 2020 European Men's Handball Championship.
