= Fabian Böhm =

German handball player (born 1989)

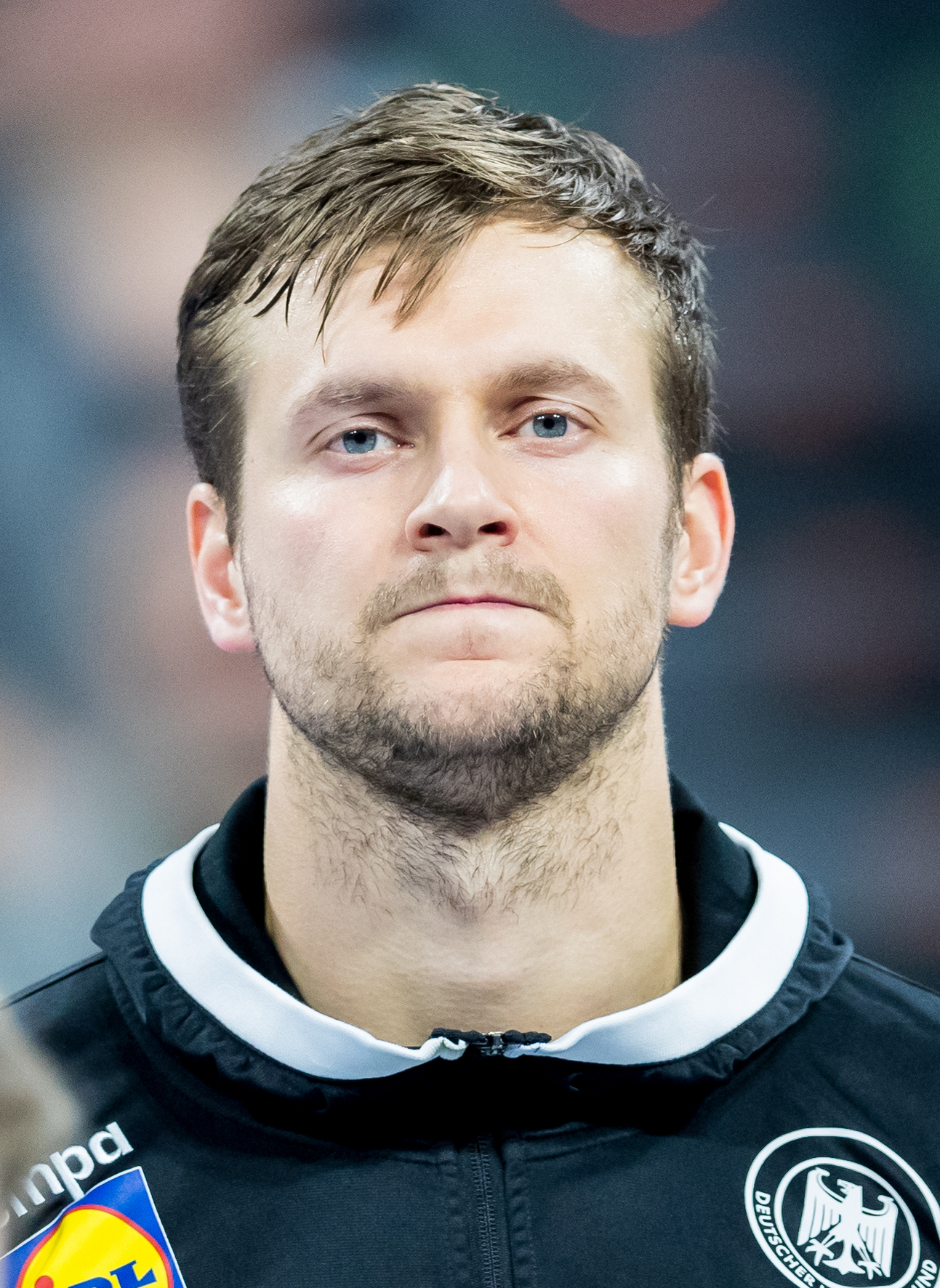
- Böhm in 2020

Personal information
- Nationality: German
- Born: 24 June 1989 (age 37) Potsdam, East Germany
- Height: 1.98 m (6 ft 6 in)

Sport
- Sport: Handball
- Position: Left back
- Current club: HC Kriens-Luzern
- Number: 20

Senior clubs
- Years: Team
- 2006–2010: SC Magdeburg
- 2010–2011: Füchse Berlin
- 2011: DHC Rheinland
- 2011–2012: Bergischer HC
- 2012–2013: TUSEM Essen
- 2013–2016: HBW Balingen-Weilstetten
- 2016–2022: TSV Hannover-Burgdorf
- 2022–2024: HC Kriens-Luzern
National team
Years	Team	Apps	(Gls)
2015–	Germany	51	(79)
- Updated on 10 October 2024

Fabian Böhm (born 24 June 1989) is a German former handball player and current coach who last played for HC Kriens-Luzern and the German national team.

He participated at the 2019 World Men's Handball Championship.

In 2024 he retired and joined the Swiss national team training staff.
