= Tom Kåre Nikolaisen =

Norwegian handball player (born 1997)

Personal information
- Full name: Tom Kåre Svegård Nikolaisen
- Nationality: Norwegian
- Born: 29 December 1997 (age 28) Trondheim, Norway
- Height: 1.96 m (6 ft 5 in)

Sport
- Sport: Handball
- Position: Pivot

Senior clubs
- Years: Team
- 2013–2020: Kolstad Håndball
- 2020–2024: Bergischer HC
- 2024–2026: HØJ Elite
National team
Years	Team	Apps	(Gls)
2019–	Norway	18	(7)
Medal record
European Championship
Bronze medal – third place	2020 Sweden/Austria/Norway
- Updated on 13 July 2024

Tom Kåre Nikolaisen (born 29 December 1997) is a Norwegian handball player.

He represented Norway at the 2020 European Men's Handball Championship.

In the 2024-25 season he was promoted with HØJ Elite to the Danish Herrehåndboldligaen. The next season the team was however relegated again.
