= Timo Kastening =

German handball player (born 1995)

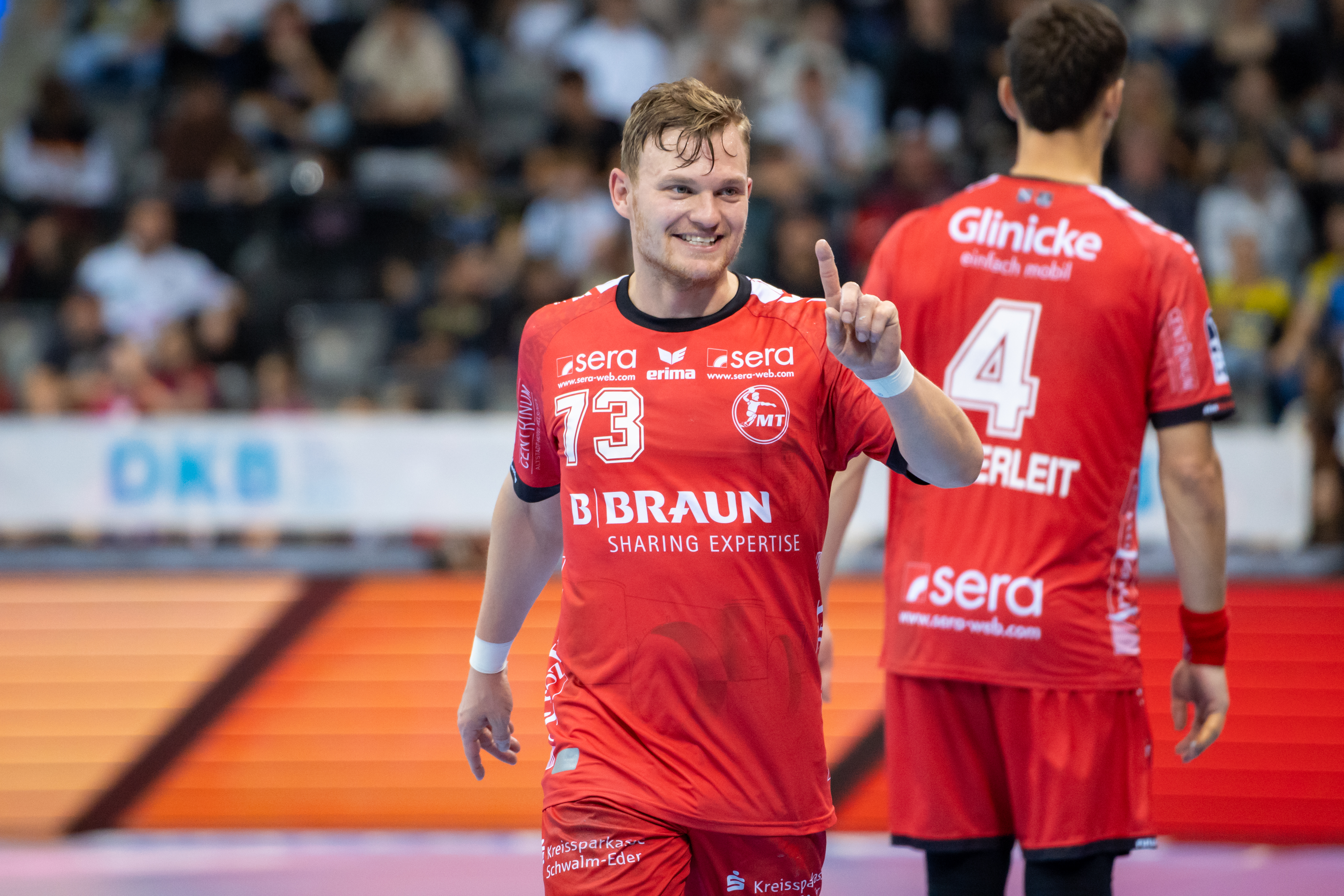

Personal information
- Nationality: German
- Born: 25 June 1995 (age 31) Stadthagen, Germany
- Height: 1.80 m (5 ft 11 in)

Sport
- Sport: Handball
- Position: Right wing
- Current club: MT Melsungen
- Number: 73

Youth career
- Years: Team
- –2006: HSG Schaumburg Nord
- 2006–2008: TSV Barsinghausen
- 2008–2013: TSV Hannover-Burgdorf

Senior clubs
- Years: Team
- 2013–2020: TSV Hannover-Burgdorf
- 2020–: MT Melsungen
National team
Years	Team	Apps	(Gls)
2019–	Germany	77	(224)
- Updated on 8 November 2026

Timo Kastening (born 25 June 1995) is a German handball player for MT Melsungen and the German national team.

He represented Germany at the 2020 European Men's Handball Championship and the 2021 World Men's Handball Championship
