= Juan Andreu =

Spanish handball player (born 1985)

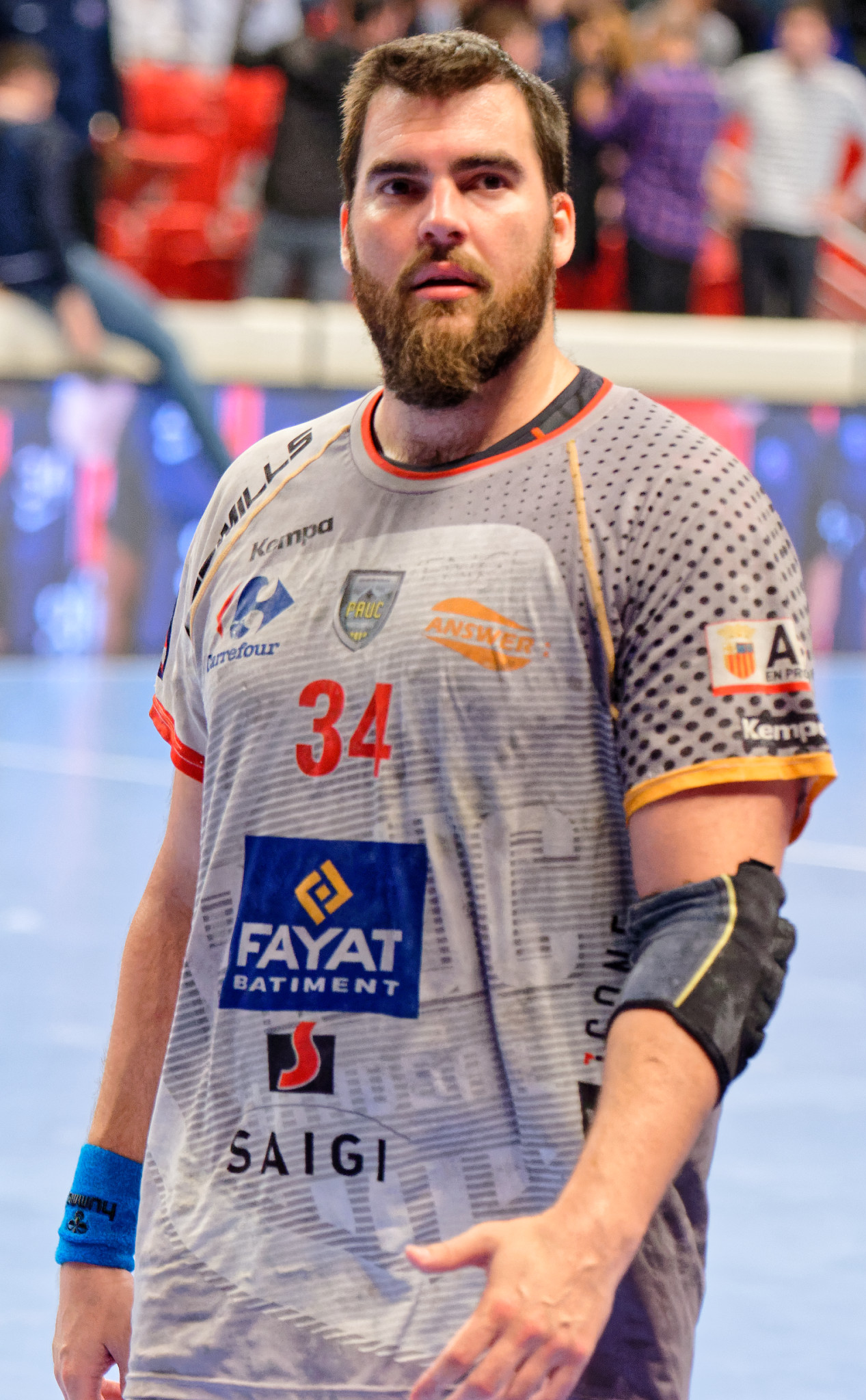

Personal information
- Full name: Juan Andreu Candau
- Nationality: Spanish
- Born: 20 January 1985 (age 41) Seville, Spain
- Height: 1.97 m (6 ft 6 in)

Sport
- Sport: Handball
- Position: Pivot
- Current club: BM Triana

Senior clubs
- Years: Team
- 2004–2010: BM Granollers
- 2010–2012: Ademar Leon
- 2012–2015: TSV Hannover-Burgdorf
- 2015–2019: Pays d'Aix Université Club
- 2019–2021: Limoges Handball
- 2021–: BM Triana
National team
Years	Team	Apps	(Gls)
2009–2015	Spain	51	(84)
Medal record
European Championships
Bronze medal – third place	2014 Denmark	Team

Juan Andreu (born 20 January 1985) is a Spanish handball player for BM Triana and previously the Spanish national team.
