= Emil Kheri Imsgard =

Norwegian handball player (born 1998)

Emil Imsgard
Personal information
- Full name: Emil Kheri Imsgard
- Nationality: Norwegian
- Born: 6 March 1998 (age 28) Hamar, Norway
- Height: 1.96 m (6 ft 5 in)

Sport
- Sport: Handball
- Position: Goalkeeper
- Current club: HØJ Elite
- Number: 12

Youth career
- Years: Team
- –2014: Furnes Håndball

Senior clubs
- Years: Team
- 2014–2016: Furnes Håndball
- 2016–2023: Elverum Håndball
- 2023–2024: OTP Bank-Pick Szeged
- 2024–2026: HØJ Elite
- 2026–: Nordsjælland Håndbold
National team
Years	Team	Apps	(Gls)
2021–	Norway	11	(0)
- Updated on 8 November 2026

Emil Kheri Imsgard (born 6 March 1998) is a Norwegian handball player for HØJ Elite and the Norwegian national team.

He was chosen in the extended squad for the 2023 World Men's Handball Championship.

== Club career ==
Imsgard started playing handball at Elverum Håndball, where he made his senior debut in 2016. In the same season he won the Norwegian Championship.

In 2023 he joined Hungarian OTP Bank-Pick Szeged.

A year later he joined HØJ Elite in the Danish second tier. In the 2024-25 season he was promoted with HØJ Elite to the Danish Herrehåndboldligaen. From the 2026-27 season he will join local rivals Nordsjælland Håndbold.
