= Arnór Þór Gunnarsson =

Icelandic handball player (born 1987)

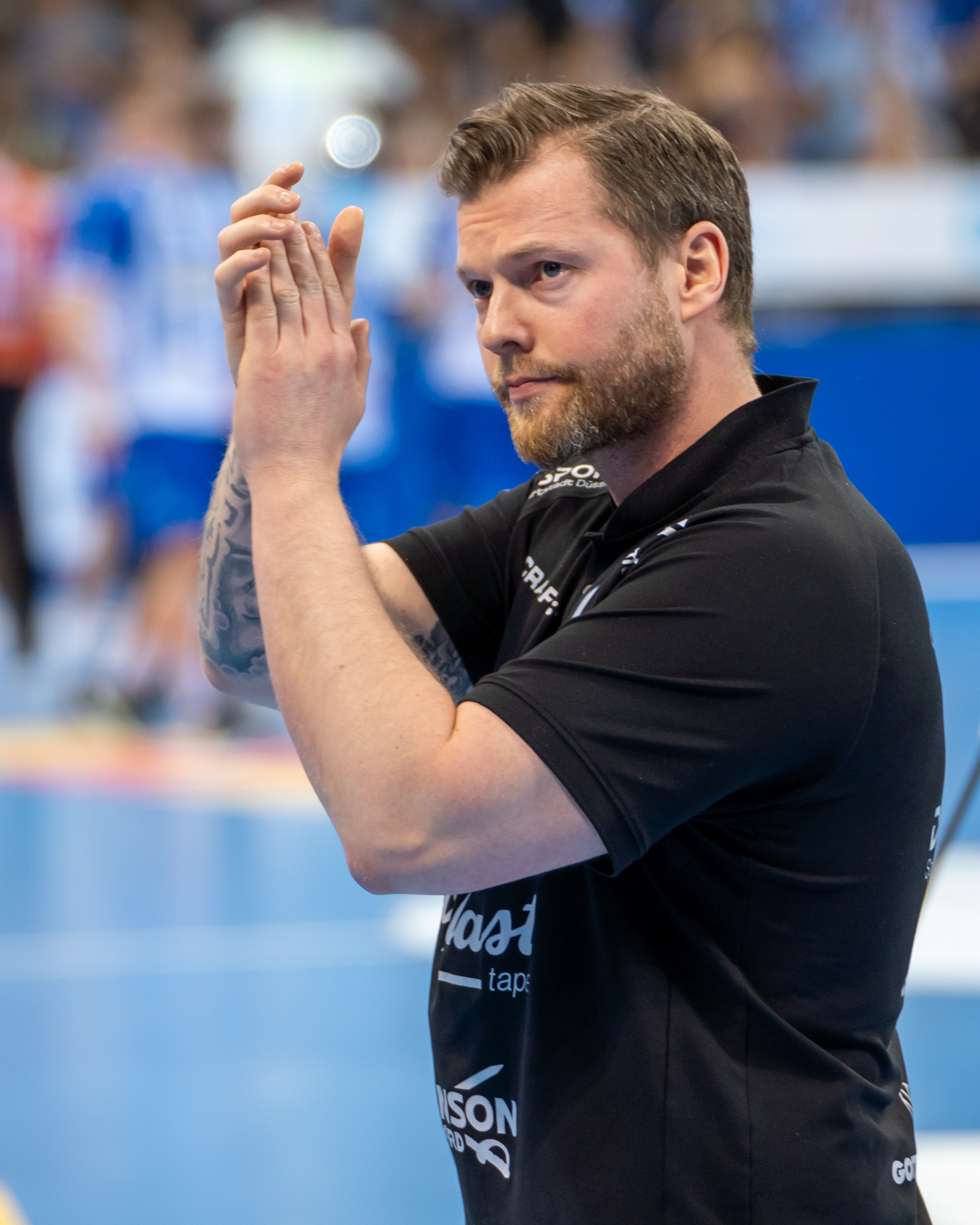

Personal information
- Nationality: Icelandic
- Born: 23 October 1987 (age 38) Akureyri, Iceland
- Height: 1.81 m (5 ft 11 in)

Sport
- Sport: Handball
- Position: Right wing

Senior clubs
- Years: Team
- –2006: Þór Akureyri
- 2006–2010: Valur
- 2010–2012: TV Bittenfeld
- 2012–2023: Bergischer HC
National team
Years	Team	Apps	(Gls)
2008–2021	Iceland	120	(322)

Arnór Þór Gunnarsson (born 23 October 1987) is an Icelandic handball coach and former player.

He played for Bergischer HC and the Icelandic national team.

In June 2023, he announced his retirement from playing and that he would stay on at Bergischer HC as an assistant coach.

== National team career ==
Arnór announced his retirement from the national team in December 2021 after 120 games.

== Personal life ==
His brother, Aron, plays for the Iceland national football team.
