= Piotr Przybecki =

Polish handball player and coach (born 1972)

Personal information
- Nationality: Polish
- Born: 7 August 1972 (age 54) Opole, Poland
- Height: 1.96 m (6 ft 5 in)

Sport
- Sport: Handball
- Position: Left back
- Current club: VfL Lübeck-Schwartau (manager)

Senior clubs
- Years: Team
- 1987–1991: Gwardia Opole
- 1991–1994: Śląsk Wrocław
- 1994–1995: Iskra Kielce
- 1995–1997: TV Hüttenberg
- 1997–2001: TUSEM Essen
- 2001–2004: THW Kiel
- 2004–2009: HSG Nordhorn
- 2009–2012: TSV Hannover-Burgdorf
National team
Years	Team	Apps	(Gls)
1989–2005	Poland	131	(372)

Teams managed
- 2014–2016: Śląsk Wrocław
- 2016–2018: Wisła Płock
- 2017–2019: Poland
- 2019–2022: VfL Lübeck-Schwartau
- 2024–2025: TuS N-Lübbecke

Piotr Przybecki (born 7 August 1972) is a retired Polish handball player and coach. Between 2024 and 2025 he was the head coach for TuS N-Lübbecke.

He was a member of the Polish handball team at the 2004 European Men's Handball Championship in Slovenia.
