= Marian Michalczik =

German handball player (born 1997)

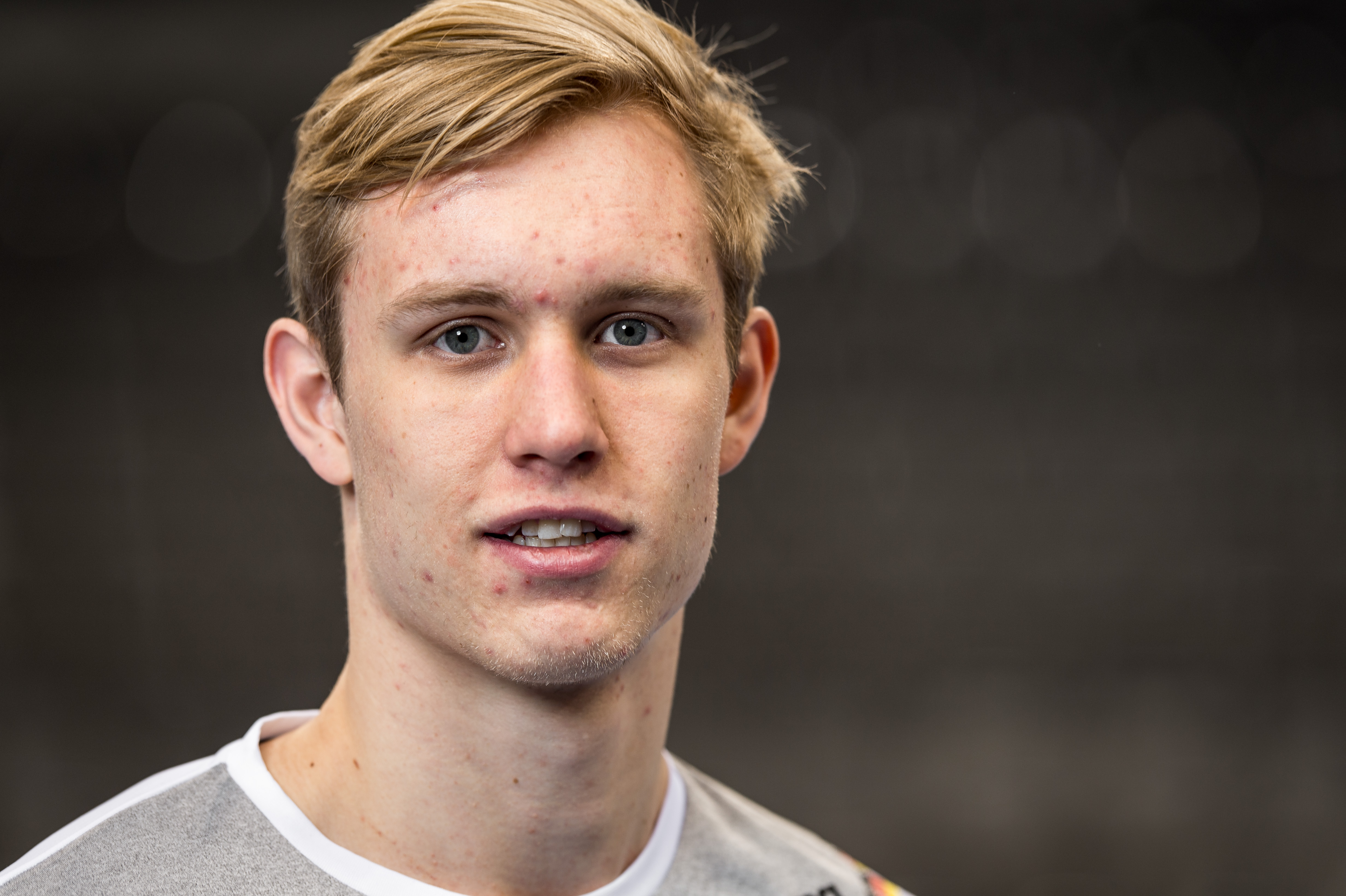

Personal information
- Nationality: German
- Born: 1 February 1997 (age 29) Beckum, Germany
- Height: 1.99 m (6 ft 6 in)

Sport
- Sport: Handball
- Position: Left back
- Current club: TSV Hannover-Burgdorf
- Number: 22

Youth career
- Years: Team
- 2002–2014: Ahlener SG
- 2014–2016: GWD Minden

Senior clubs
- Years: Team
- 2016–2020: GWD Minden
- 2020–2022: Füchse Berlin
- 2022–: TSV Hannover-Burgdorf
National team
Years	Team	Apps	(Gls)
2017–	Germany	32	(27)
- Updated on 2. January 2025

Marian Michalczik (born 1 February 1997) is a German handball player for TSV Hannover-Burgdorf and the German national team.

He represented Germany at the 2020 European Men's Handball Championship.
