= TSV Hannover-Burgdorf =

German handball club

- Full name: Turn- und Sportvereinigung Hannover-Burgdorf Handball GmbH
- Nickname: Die Recken
- Short name: TSV
- Founded: 1922; 104 years ago
- Arena: Swiss Life Hall; ZAG-Arena
- Capacity: 4,460; 10,767
- Head coach: Juan Carlos Pastor
- League: Handball-Bundesliga
- 2025–26: 11th of 18
- Club colours
Home	Away

TSV Hannover-Burgdorf is a handball club from Hannover, Germany, and is competing in the Handball-Bundesliga.

Location of TSV Hannover-Burgdorf

== History ==
The team is known as DIE RECKEN. The origins of the club lie with the sports association Freie Turnerschaft Burgdorf, which was founded in 1922, with a handball department. In 1946 the Turn- und Sportvereinigung Burgdorf was founded. TSV Burgdorf became TSV Hannover-Burgdorf Handball GmbH in 2005. The matches of the top teams have been played since 2005 in one of the two sports arenas in Hannover, the Swiss Life Hall with a capacity of 4,460 spectators, or the ZAG-Arena where 10,767 spectators can cheer on the team. Given the increasing number of supporters, since 2018 more and more games have been played in the second hall.

== Crest, colours, supporters ==
=== Naming history ===
Name	Period
Freie Turnerschaft Burgdorf	1922–1946
TSV Burgdorf	1946–2005
TSV Hannover-Burgdorf	2005–present

=== Kit manufacturers ===
Period	Kit manufacturer
–2013	(Denmark) Hummel
2013–present	(Germany) Adidas

== Team ==
Squad for the 2025-26 season

Goalkeepers

- 16 (Denmark) Simon Gade
- 35 (Germany) Joel Birlehm

Left wingers

- 17 (Norway) August Pedersen
- 56 (Germany) Hannes Feise

Right wingers

- 19 (Germany) Marius Steinhauser
- (Germany) Daniel Weber

Line players

- 44 (Norway) Thomas Solstad
- 54 (Germany) Justus Fischer
- (Germany) Luis Rodriguez

Left backs

- 22 (Germany) Marian Michalczik
- 39 (Germany) Lukas Stutzke

Centre Backs

- 26 (Sweden) Jonathan Edvardsson
- (Norway) Sindre Aho
- (Germany) Leif Tissier
- (Germany) Maxim Orlov

Right backs

- 9 (Faroe Islands) Vilhelm Poulsen
- 10 (Germany) Renārs Uščins

=== Technical staff ===
- Head coach: (Germany) Christian Prokop
- Assistant coach: (Iceland) Heiðmar Felixson
- Athletic Trainer: (Germany) Timm Kostrzewa
- Physiotherapist: (Germany) Johannes Bode
- Club doctor: (Germany) Dr. Marcus Schönaich

=== Transfers ===
Transfers for the 2027–28 season

Joining

Leaving

- (Germany) Renārs Uščins (RB) (to (France) Paris Saint-Germain Handball)
- (Germany) Justus Fischer (LP) (to (Germany) THW Kiel)

=== Transfer History ===
Transfers for the 2026–27 season

Joining

- (Iceland) Sigvaldi Guðjónsson (RW) from (Norway) Kolstad Håndball
- (Germany) Sebastian Heymann (LB) from (Germany) Rhein-Neckar Löwen
- (Germany) Tim Zechel (LP) from (Germany) SC Magdeburg

Leaving

- (Norway) Thomas Solstad (LP) to (Denmark) HØJ Elite
- (Norway) Sindre Aho (CB) to (France) Dijon Métropole Handball
- (Germany) Marius Steinhauser (RW) to (Germany) Rhein-Neckar Löwen
- (Germany) Luis Rodriguez (LP) to (Germany) TuS Vinnhorst
- (Germany) Johannes Thiel (RB) to (Germany) HSG Nordhorn-Lingen

Transfers for the 2025–26 season

Joining

- (Norway) August Pedersen (LW) from (Germany) SG Flensburg-Handewitt
- (Norway) Sindre Aho (CB) (from (France) Montpellier Handball)
- (Germany) Leif Tissier (CB) from (Germany) HSV Hamburg
- (Germany) Maxim Orlov (CB) from (Germany) 1. VfL Potsdam
- (Germany) Daniel Weber (RW) (from (Germany) TuS Vinnhorst)

Leaving

- (Belarus) Uladzislau Kulesh (LB) to (Germany) MT Melsungen
- (Slovenia) Tilen Strmljan (CB) to (North Macedonia) GRK Ohrid
- (Turkey) (Germany) Koray Ayar (LP) to (Turkey) Beşiktaş JK
- (Germany) Martin Hanne (LB) to (Germany) Frisch Auf Göppingen
- (Germany) Vincent Büchner (LW) to (Germany) ThSV Eisenach
- (Germany) Leonard Zink (RB) to (Germany) VfL Lübeck-Schwartau
- (Germany) Maxim Orlov (CB) to (Germany) SG BBM Bietigheim

== Previous squads ==
2018–2019 Team
Shirt No	Nationality	Player	Birth Date	Position
1	Germany	Martin Ziemer	14 April 1983 (age 43)	Goalkeeper
2	Germany	Torge Johannsen	6 April 1983 (age 43)	Right Winger
3	Slovenia	Nejc Cehte	4 September 1992 (age 34)	Right Back
8	Germany	Veit Mävers	3 December 2000 (age 25)	Central Back
9	Estonia	Mait Patrail	11 April 1988 (age 38)	Left Back
13	Germany	Joshua Thiele	10 June 1998 (age 28)	Line Player
14	Germany	Evgeni Pevnov	13 February 1989 (age 37)	Line Player
15	Germany	Lars Lehnhoff	20 September 1986 (age 40)	Left Winger
17	Germany	Kai Häfner	10 July 1989 (age 37)	Right Back
19	Russia	Pavel Atman	25 May 1987 (age 39)	Central Back
20	Germany	Fabian Böhm	24 June 1989 (age 37)	Left Back
22	Germany	Jonas Wilde	22 January 1998 (age 28)	Goalkeeper
23	Spain	Cristian Ugalde	19 October 1987 (age 39)	Left Winger
24	Germany	Jannes Krone	23 April 1997 (age 29)	Right Winger
33	CroatiaUnited States	Domagoj Srsen	31 December 1990 (age 35)	Line Player
34	Denmark	Morten Olsen	11 October 1984 (age 42)	Central Back
44	Croatia	Ilija Brozović	26 May 1991 (age 35)	Line Player
56	Germany	Hannes Feise	5 June 1996 (age 30)	Left Back
73	Germany	Timo Kastening	25 June 1995 (age 31)	Right Winger
74	Germany	Vincent Büchner	30 May 1998 (age 28)	Left Winger
90	Slovenia	Urban Lesjak	24 August 1990 (age 36)	Goalkeeper

2013–2014 Team
Shirt No	Nationality	Player	Birth Date	Position
1	Germany	Martin Ziemer	14 April 1983 (age 43)	Goalkeeper
2	Germany	Torge Johannsen	6 April 1983 (age 43)	Right Winger
4	Spain	Juan Andreu	20 January 1985 (age 41)	Line Player
5	Hungary	Tamás Mocsai	9 December 1978 (age 47)	Right Back
9	Estonia	Mait Patrail	11 April 1988 (age 38)	Left Back
12	Germany	Jannis Finke	13 October 1993 (age 33)	Goalkeeper
13	Germany	Jan-Fiete Buschmann	17 May 1981 (age 45)	Right Back
14	Norway	Joakim Hykkerud	10 February 1986 (age 40)	Line Player
15	Germany	Lars Lehnhoff	20 September 1986 (age 40)	Left Winger
18	Sweden	Gustav Rydergård	9 July 1984 (age 42)	Line Player
21	Slovakia	Csaba Szücs	28 July 1987 (age 39)	Central Back
22	Montenegro	Vasko Ševaljević	21 June 1988 (age 38)	Left Back
24	Iceland	Rúnar Kárason	24 May 1988 (age 38)	Right Back
28	Spain	Álvaro Ferrer Vecilla	17 March 1982 (age 44)	Central Back
37	Germany	Julius Hinz	4 March 1993 (age 33)	Left Winger
51	Slovenia	Borut Mačkovšek	11 September 1992 (age 34)	Left Back
73	Germany	Timo Kastening	25 June 1995 (age 31)	Right Winger
98	Germany	Nikolai Weber	25 October 1980 (age 46)	Goalkeeper

2009–2010 Team
Shirt No	Nationality	Player	Birth Date	Position
1	Germany	Jendrik Meyer	4 August 1982 (age 44)	Goalkeeper
2	Germany	Torge Johannsen	6 April 1983 (age 43)	Right Winger
6	Poland	Piotr Przybecki	7 August 1972 (age 54)	Central Back
8	Iceland	Hannes Jón Jónsson	23 February 1980 (age 46)	Central Back
9	Germany	Frank Habbe	11 January 1978 (age 48)	Line Player
10	Lithuania	Robertas Paužuolis	28 October 1972 (age 54)	Left Back
11	Latvia	Aivis Jurdžs	24 August 1983 (age 43)	Left Back
13	Germany	Jan-Fiete Buschmann	17 May 1981 (age 45)	Right Back
14	Lithuania	Andrius Stelmokas	3 March 1974 (age 52)	Line Player
15	Germany	Lars Lehnhoff	20 September 1986 (age 40)	Left Winger
16	Germany	Alexander Hübe	22 April 1983 (age 43)	Goalkeeper
17	Germany	Marc Hohenberg	3 March 1985 (age 41)	Right Winger
18	Sweden	Gustav Rydergård	9 July 1984 (age 42)	Line Player
19	Germany	Daniel Brack	19 March 1981 (age 45)	Central Back
20	Germany	Jannis Fauteck	15 June 1988 (age 38)	Left Back
21	Poland	Jacek Będzikowski	22 October 1972 (age 54)	Left Back
23	Germany	Thomas Bergmann	14 August 1989 (age 37)	Right Winger
28	HungarySerbia	Nenad Puljezević	13 March 1973 (age 53)	Goalkeeper
92	Germany	Lars Friedrich	23 April 1985 (age 41)	Right Back

== EHF ranking ==
As of 22 October 2026

Rank	Team	Points
23	(Norway) Elverum Håndball	175
24	(Portugal) S.L. Benfica	172
25	(Spain) Bidasoa Irun	168
26	(Germany) TSV Hannover-Burgdorf	165
27	(Spain) BM Granollers	163
28	(Slovenia) Celje Pivovarna Laško	162
29	(Hungary) MOL Tatabánya KC	159

== Former club members ==
=== Notable former players ===
- (Germany) Fabian Böhm (2016–2022)
- (Germany) Jan-Fiete Buschmann (2009–2015)
- (Germany) Sven-Sören Christophersen (2014–2018)
- (Germany) (Italy) Domenico Ebner (2019–2023)
- (Germany) Kai Häfner (2014–2019)
- (Germany) Timo Kastening (2008–2020)
- (Germany) Nikolas Katsigiannis (2010–2012)
- (Germany) Jörg-Uwe Lütt (2004–2008)
- (Germany) Marian Michalczik (2022–)
- (Germany) Evgeni Pevnov (2017–2023)
- (Germany) Dario Quenstedt (2022–2024)
- (Germany) Bastian Roscheck (2021–2023)
- (Germany) Erik Schmidt (2015–2017)
- (Germany) Martin Ziemer (2012–2019)
- (Austria) David Szlezak (2008)
- (Brazil) Renato Rui (2006)
- (Croatia) Ilija Brozović (2017–2024)
- (Croatia) Ivan Martinović (2019–2022)
- (Cuba) (Iceland) Roberto Julián Duranona (2003–2004)
- (Denmark) Jóhan Hansen (2020–2022)
- (Denmark) Casper Ulrich Mortensen (2016–2018)
- (Denmark) Morten Olsen (2010–2013, 2015–2020)
- (Estonia) Mait Patrail (2012–2020)
- (Hungary) Tamás Mocsai (2012–2013)
- (Hungary) (Serbia) Nenad Puljezević (2009–2013)
- (Iceland) Heiðmar Felixson (2004–2009)
- (Iceland) Ólafur Guðmundsson (2014–2015)
- (Iceland) Ásgeir Örn Hallgrímsson (2010–2012)
- (Iceland) Hannes Jón Jónsson (2008–2012)
- (Iceland) Rúnar Kárason (2013–2018)
- (Iceland) Vignir Svavarsson (2010–2012)
- (Iceland) Sigurbergur Sveinsson (2011)
- (Latvia) Aivis Jurdžs (2009–2013)
- (Lithuania) Robertas Paužuolis (2005–2010)
- (Lithuania) Andrius Stelmokas (2008–2010)
- (North Macedonia) Filip Mirkulovski (2015)
- (North Macedonia) Filip Kuzmanovski (2020–2023)
- (Montenegro) Vasko Ševaljević (2013–2015)
- (Montenegro) Branko Vujović (2022–)
- (Norway) Joakim Hykkerud (2012–2017)
- (Poland) Jacek Będzikowski (2008–2011)
- (Poland) Piotr Przybecki (2009–2012)
- (Poland) Tomasz Tłuczyński (2005–2009)
- (Poland) Adam Weiner (2011–2014)
- (Russia) Pavel Atman (2017–2019)
- (Russia) (Belarus) Aleksandr Tuchkin (2004–2005)
- (Slovenia) Nejc Cehte (2018–2022)
- (Slovenia) Urban Lesjak (2018–2022)
- (Slovenia) Borut Mačkovšek (2013–2014)
- (Spain) Juan Andreu (2012–2015)
- (Spain) Álvaro Ferrer Vecilla (2014)
- (Spain) Cristian Ugalde (2018–2020)
- (Switzerland) Maximilian Gerbl (2022–)
- (Slovakia) Csaba Szücs (2011–2017)

=== Former coaches ===
Seasons	Coach	Country
2007–2010	Frank Carstens	(Germany)
2010–2011	Aron Kristjánsson	(Iceland)
2011–2015	Christopher Nordmeyer	(Germany)
2015–2017	Jens Bürkle	(Germany)
2017–2021	Antonio Carlos Ortega	(Spain)
2021–2026	Christian Prokop	(Germany)
2026–	Juan Carlos Pastor	(Spain)

== Youth Handball ==
=== A-Juniors ===
The A-Juniors of the TSV Burgdorf play in the highest German Youth League the "Jugendbundesliga". Being one of the 20 best German teams.

=== B-Juniors ===
The B-Juniors which 2024/25 were the second best German team and first vice champions of the, 2024/25 founded highest B-Junior league, Jugendbundesliga. Auto Qualified for the 2024/25 founded highest B-Junior league the German Jugendbundesliga B-Jugend.
