= Linus Arnesson (handballer) =

Swedish handball player (born 1990)

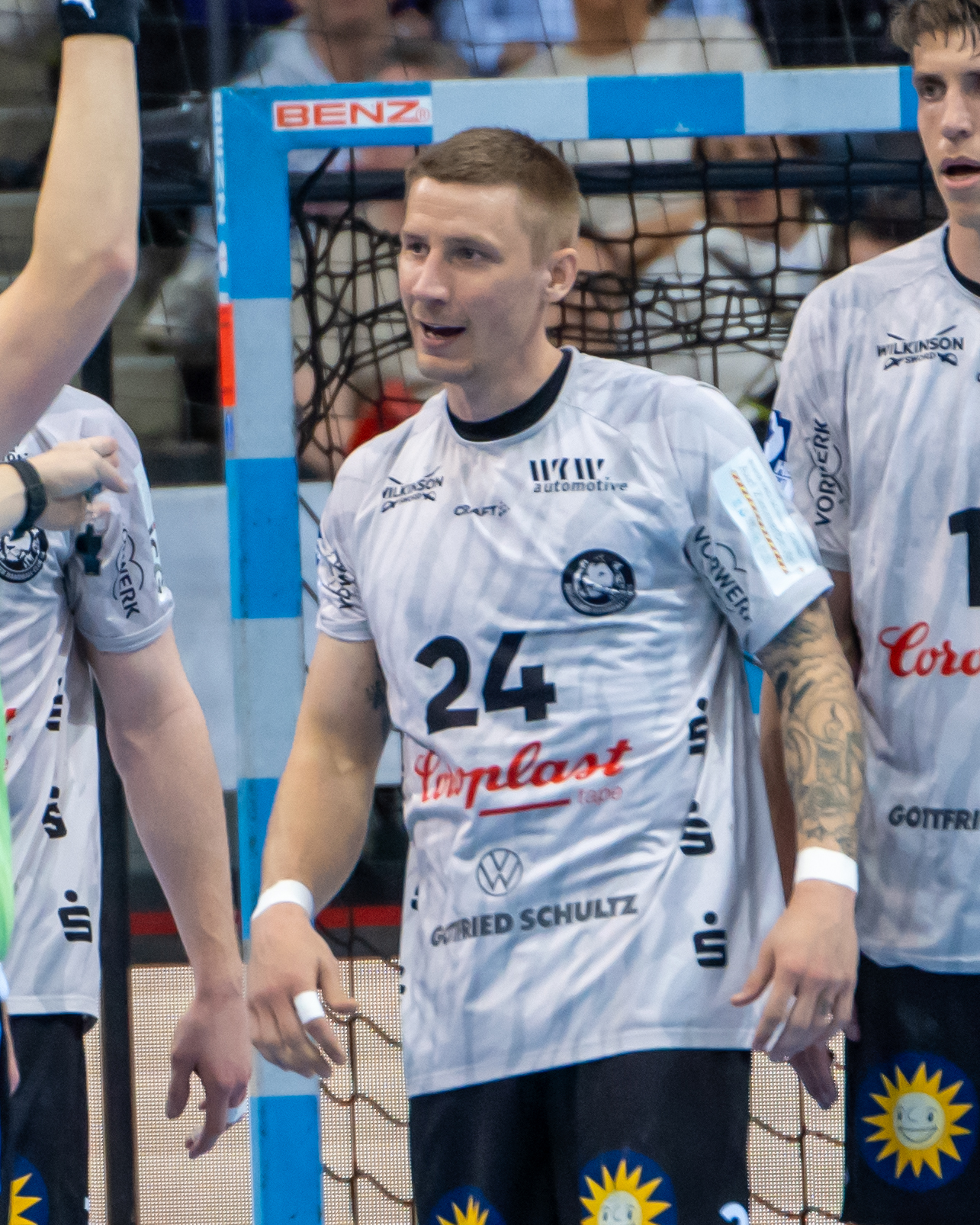

Personal information
- Nationality: Swedish
- Born: 11 May 1990 (age 36) Hedemora, Sweden
- Height: 1.88 m (6 ft 2 in)

Sport
- Sport: Handball
- Position: Centre back
- Current club: HØJ Elite
- Number: 24

Senior clubs
- Years: Team
- 2007–2017: Redbergslids IK
- 2017–2024: Bergischer HC
- 2024–: HØJ Elite
National team
Years	Team	Apps	(Gls)
2017–	Sweden	42	(54)
Medal record
European Championship
Silver medal – second place	2018 Croatia

Linus Arnesson (born 11 May 1990) is a Swedish handball player for HØJ Elite and the Swedish national team.

He participated at the 2018 European Men's Handball Championship.

In the 2024-25 season he was promoted with HØJ Elite to the Danish Herrehåndboldligaen. The next season the team was however relegated again.
