= Jannick Green =

Danish handball player (born 1988)

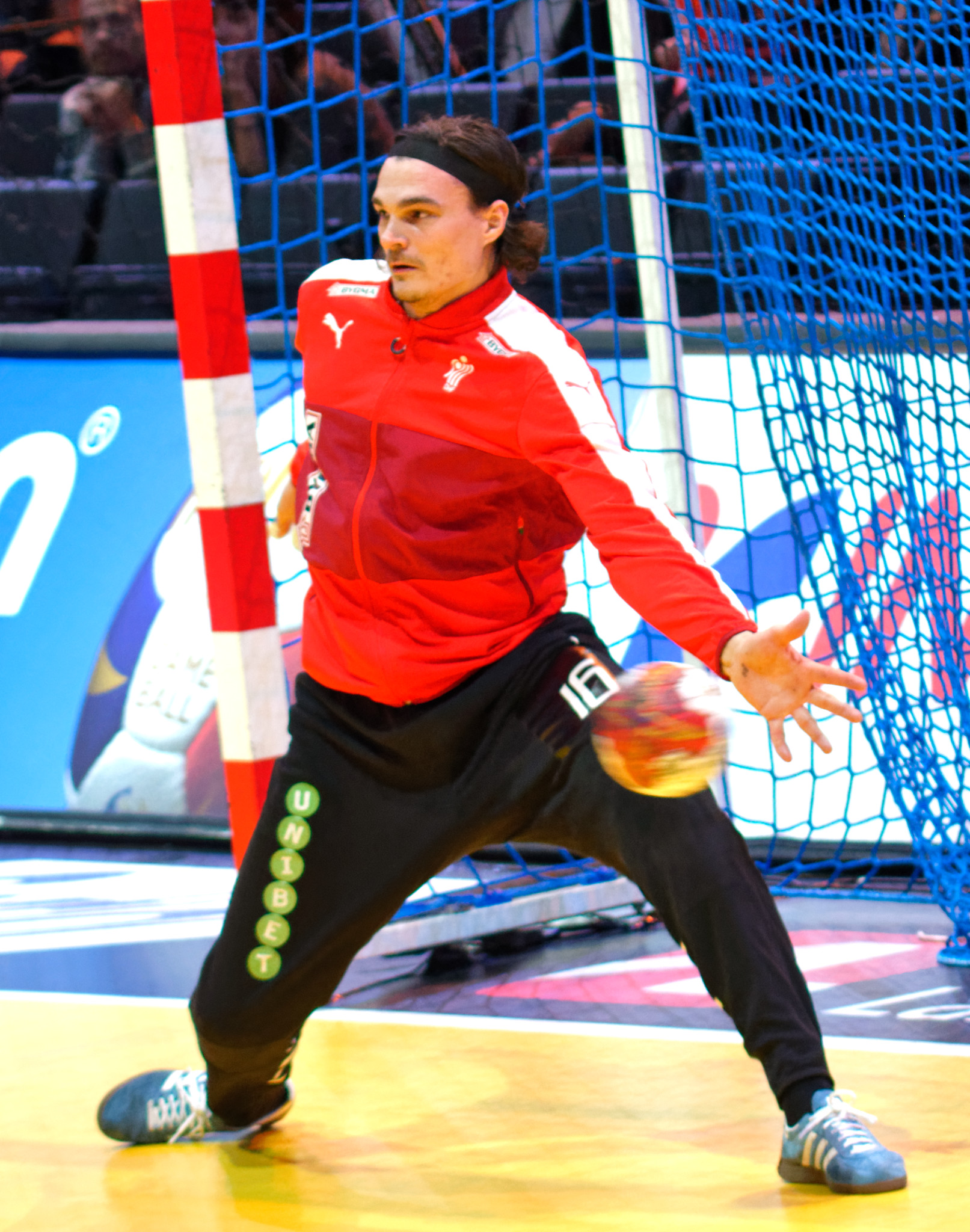
- Green in 2017

Personal information
- Full name: Jannick Green Krejberg
- Nationality: Danish
- Born: 29 September 1988 (age 38) Lemvig, Denmark
- Height: 1.95 m (6 ft 5 in)

Sport
- Sport: Handball
- Position: Goalkeeper
- Current club: Paris Saint-Germain
- Number: 16

Senior clubs
- Years: Team
- 2007–2008: Lemvig-Thyborøn Håndbold
- 2008–2011: AaB Håndbold
- 2011–2014: Bjerringbro-Silkeborg
- 2014–2022: SC Magdeburg
- 2022–2026: Paris Saint-Germain
- 2026–: HØJ Elite
National team
Years	Team	Apps	(Gls)
2007–	Denmark	145	(3)
Medal record
Olympic Games
Gold medal – first place	2016 Rio de Janeiro	Team
World Championship
Gold medal – first place	2019 Germany/Denmark
Gold medal – first place	2025 Croatia/Denmark/Norway
Silver medal – second place	2013 Spain
European Championship
Silver medal – second place	2014 Denmark
Bronze medal – third place	2022 Hungary/Slovakia
Junior World Championship
Silver medal – second place	2009 Egypt
- Updated on 29 January 2026

Jannick Green Krejberg (born 29 September 1988) is a Danish professional handball player for Paris Saint-Germain and the Danish national team.

== Career ==
As a kid he played both football and handball, and chose to focus on handball at the age of 14. He played for the Danish team Team Vestjylland, where he won the Danish youth championship in 2007/2008.

In the 2007/08 season he joined Lemvig Håndbold, where he got his senior debut. He debuted for the Danish national team on October 25th 2007 against Hungary. After a season at Lemvig he joined AaB Håndbold, where he won the Danish Championship in 2010. In 2011 he changed to Bjerringbro-Silkeborg.

In 2014 he changed to Bundesliga team SC Magdeburg. Here he won the German cup in 2016, the EHF European League in 2021 and the IHF Super Globe and the Bundesliga in 2022.

In 2019 he was part of the Danish team that won the 2021 World Championship; the first time Denmark won the title.

In 2022 he joined French team Paris Saint-Germain, where he won the French Championship in 2023 and 2024.

At the 2025 World Men's Handball Championship, he was initially not part of the squad, but was later called up to replace Kevin Møller who left when his wife went into labour. Denmark would go on to win the tournament.

== Private life ==
Green comes from a handball family. His mother Hanna Green was a Danish national team player, and his father was the coach of Lemvig Håndbold's women's team. His brother, Jeppe Green, is a handball player for Aalborg Håndbold.
