= Richard Wöss =

Austrian handball player (born 1986)

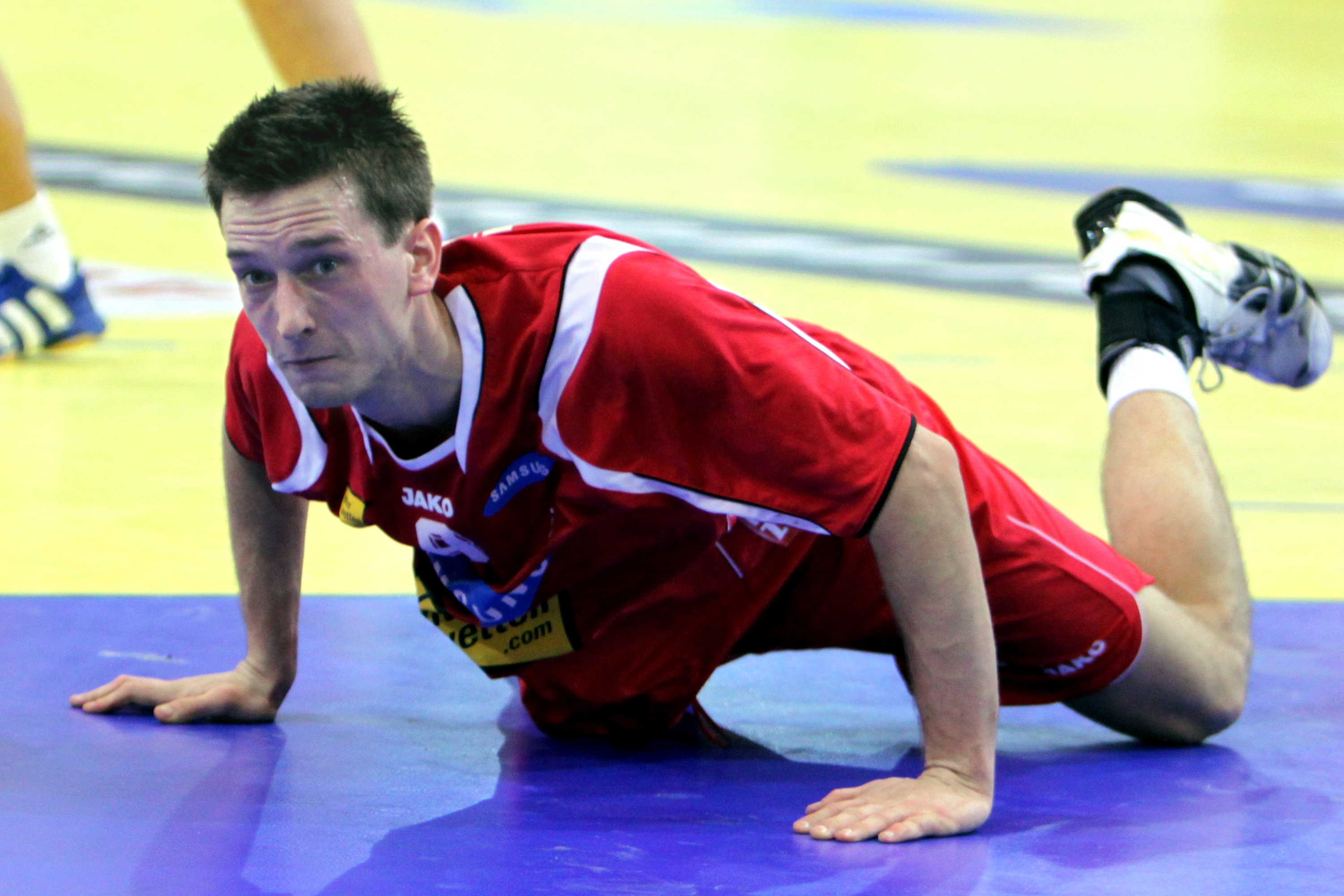

Personal information
- Nationality: Austrian
- Born: 10 October 1986 (age 40) Vienna, Austria
- Height: 1.86 m (6 ft 1 in)

Sport
- Sport: Handball
- Position: Right wing
- Current club: Handball Tirol
- Number: 18

Youth career
- Years: Team
- 1994–2004: AON Fivers

Senior clubs
- Years: Team
- 2004–2007: AON Fivers
- 2007–2009: HIT Innsbruck
- 2009–2011: TUSEM Essen
- 2011–2014: Bergischer HC
- 2014–2015: TuS N-Lübbecke
- 2015–2016: Handballclub Fivers Margareten
- 2017–2018: TUSEM Essen
- 2018–2019: HT München
- 2019–2022: Handball Tirol
- 2022–2024: Jags Vöslau
National team
Years	Team	Apps	(Gls)
–	Austria	84	(115)

Richard Wöss (born 10 October 1986) is an Austrian former handball player the Austrian national team.

He represented Austria at the 2014 European Men's Handball Championship.

== Career ==
Vöss started his career at Fivers Margareten, where he played until 2007, where he joined HIT Innsbruck.

Two years later he joined German club TUSEM Essen. In 2011 he joined Bergischer HC. In 2014 he signed for TuS N-Lübbecke.

In 2015 he moved back to his childhood club, Fivers. Here he won the Austrian Cup.

In February 2017 he returned to TUSEM Essen.

In June 2018 he joined HT München. For the 2019–20 season he joined Handball Tirol. He retired in 2022, but returned to the court to join Jags Vöslau, where he played until 2024.
