= Emil Mellegård =

Swedish handball player (born 1993)

Personal information
- Nationality: Swedish
- Born: 6 November 1997 (age 28) Gothenburg, Sweden
- Height: 1.95 m (6 ft 5 in)

Sport
- Sport: Handball
- Position: Left wing
- Current club: Paris Saint-Germain
- Number: 9

Youth career
- Years: Team
- –2013: Kärra HF

Senior clubs
- Years: Team
- 2013–2020: Redbergslids IK
- 2020–2024: HSG Wetzlar
- 2024–2025: HØJ Elite
- 2025–: Paris Saint-Germain
National team
| Years | Team | Apps | (Gls) |
| 2017– | Sweden | 21 | (29) |
Medal record
| Gold medal – first place | 2022 Hungary/Slovakia |

Emil Mellegård (born 6 November 1997) is a Swedish professional handballer for Paris Saint-Germain. He has also played for the Swedish national team.

At the 2022 European Championship he won gold medals with Sweden.

== Career ==
Mellegård began his senior career with Redbergslids IK, the twenty-times winners of the Handbollsligan, however during his time there they won no silverware. The best achievement of Mellegård's career was being selected for, and winning, the 2022 European Men's Handball Championship with Sweden, a tournament where he featured in eight matches. It was announced in December 2023 that he would leave Wetzlar at the end of the 2023–24 season. In the 2024-25 season he was promoted with HØJ Elite to the Danish Herrehåndboldligaen.

== Personal life ==
His cousins Pontus Mellegård and Olivia Mellegård are also professional handball players. The latter is a national team player for the Sweden women's national handball team.
