= Simon Gade =

Danish handball player (born 1997)

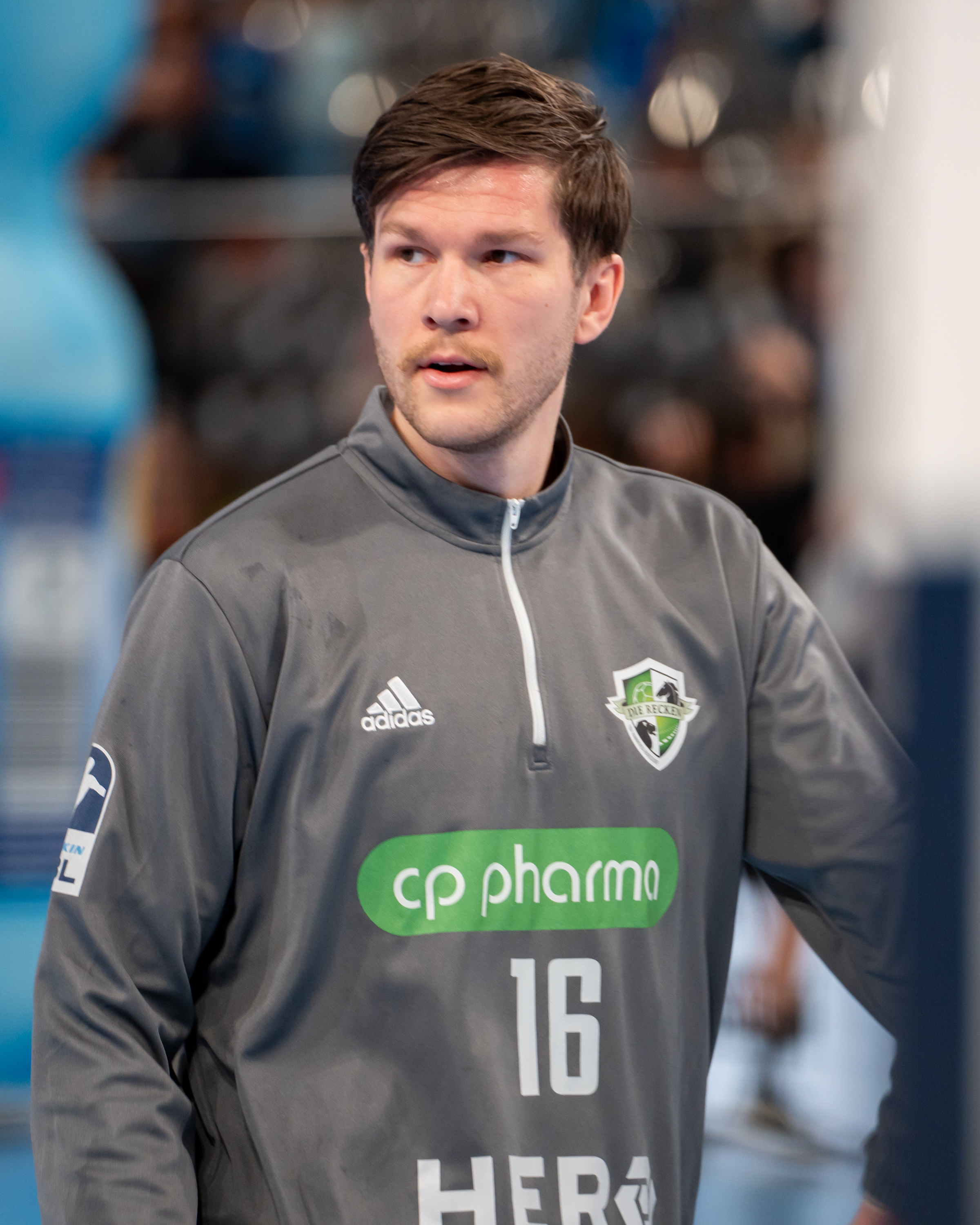

Personal information
- Full name: Simon Sandgrav Gade
- Nationality: Danish
- Born: 3 January 1997 (age 29) Holstebro, Denmark
- Height: 1.94 m (6 ft 4 in)

Sport
- Sport: Handball
- Position: Goalkeeper
- Current club: TSV Hannover-Burgdorf

Youth career
- Years: Team
- -2014: TTH Holstebro

Senior clubs
- Years: Team
- 2014–2020: TTH Holstebro
- 2020–2023: Aalborg Håndbold
- 2023–: TSV Hannover-Burgdorf
National team
Years	Team	Apps	(Gls)
2023–	Denmark	2	(0)
Medal record
Junior World Championship
Silver medal – second place	2017 Algeria
- Updated on 22 November 2025

Simon Gade (born 3 January 1997) is a Danish handball player who plays for TSV Hannover-Burgdorf and the Danish national team. He has played several matches for the Danish national junior and youth teams.

== Career ==
Gade started playing handball in his hometown club Team Tvis Holstebro. Here he earned his league debut in 2014.

In November 2019, he signed a contract with the Danish League club Aalborg Håndbold to join the following summer. Here he won the 2021 Danish Championships.

In 2023 he transferred to German Bundesliga team TSV Hannover-Burgdorf.
