= Peter Johannesson =

Swedish handball player (born 1992)

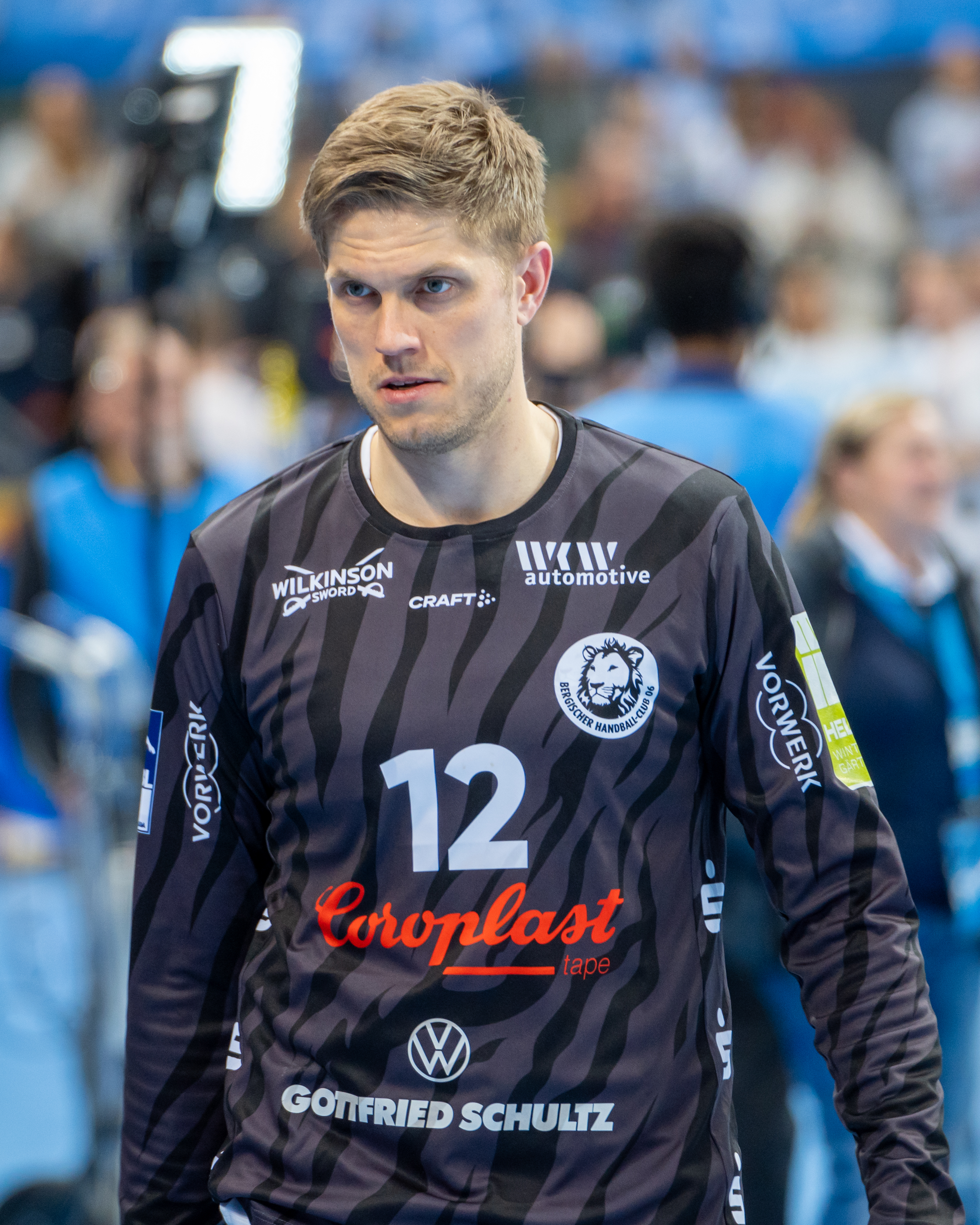

Personal information
- Nationality: Swedish
- Born: 12 May 1992 (age 34) Västra Götaland County, Sweden
- Height: 1.91 m (6 ft 3 in)

Sport
- Sport: Handball
- Position: Goalkeeper
- Current club: Bergischer HC
- Number: 12

Senior clubs
- Years: Team
- –2009: GIK Wasaiterna Handboll
- 2009–2015: IK Sävehof
- 2015–2017: HBW Balingen-Weilstetten
- 2017–2022: TBV Lemgo
- 2022–2024: Bergischer HC
- 2024–: GOG Håndbold
National team
Years	Team	Apps	(Gls)
2013–	Sweden	28	(2)
Medal record
World Championship
Silver medal – second place	2021 Egypt
European Championship
Gold medal – first place	2022 Hungary/Slovakia
- Updated on 24 August 2024

Peter Johannesson (born 12 May 1992) is a Swedish handball player for Danish club GOG Håndbold and the Swedish national team.

== Career ==
Johannesson started playing handball at GIK Wasaiterna.

In 2009 he joined IK Sävehof, where he won the EHF European Cup in the 2013–14 season, as well as the Elitserien in 2010, 2011 and 2012.

In October 2015 he joined German side HBW Balingen-Weilstetten. For the 2017-18 season he joined TBV Lemgo. Here he won the DHB-Pokal in 2019-20.

In 2022 he joined Bergischer HC. In 2024 he joined Danish side GOG Håndbold.

=== National team ===
Johannesson made his debut for the Swedish National Team on January 10th 2013 against Czechia.

He represented Sweden at the 2021 World Men's Handball Championship, where Sweden won silver medals losing to Denmark in the final.

At the 2022 European Men's Handball Championship he won gold medals with the Swedish team, playing in 5 out of 9 matches.
