= Sigvaldi Guðjónsson =

Icelandic handball player (born 1994)

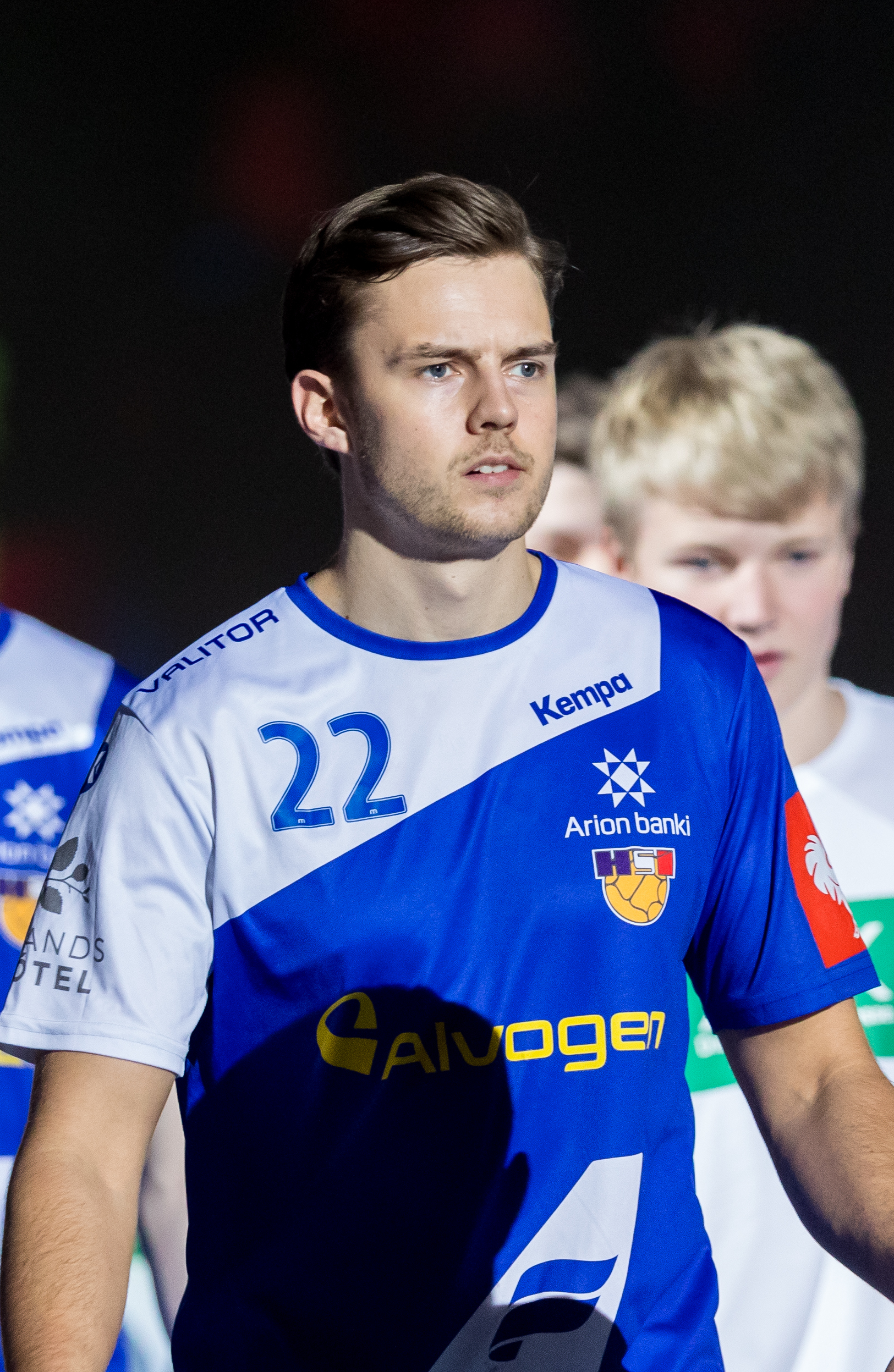
- Guðjónsson in 2020

Personal information
- Nationality: Icelandic
- Born: 4 July 1994 (age 32) Reykjavík, Iceland
- Height: 1.91 m (6 ft 3 in)

Sport
- Sport: Handball
- Position: Right wing
- Current club: TSV Hannover-Burgdorf
- Number: 48

Youth career
- Years: Team
- –: Aarhus Håndbold

Senior clubs
- Years: Team
- 2013–2014: Vejle Håndbold
- 2014–2015: Bjerringbro-Silkeborg
- 2015–2018: Aarhus Håndbold
- 2018–2020: Elverum Håndball
- 2020–2022: Łomża Vive Kielce
- 2022–2026: Kolstad Håndball
- 2026–: TSV Hannover-Burgdorf
National team
Years	Team	Apps	(Gls)
2018–	Iceland	27	(52)

Sigvaldi Guðjónsson (born 4 July 1994) is an Icelandic handball player for TSV Hannover-Burgdorf and the Icelandic national team.

In addition to regular handball, he also plays beach handball.

He participated at the 2019 World Men's Handball Championship.

He moved to Denmark at the age of ten, and came up through the Århus Håndbold academy. In the 2011-12 he won the Danish youth championship with the club. In the 2013-14 he played for the Danish 1st Division team Vejle Håndbold.

In 2014 he joined Bjerringbro-Silkeborg. After a season there, he returned to Århus Håndbold, where he played for the next three seasons.

In 2018 he joined Norwegian team Elverum Håndball

In 2020 he joined Polish team Vive Kielce, where he won the 2021 and 2022 Polish championships, and the 2021 Polish Cup. In 2022 he returned to Norway to join Kolstad Håndball. Here he won the 2023 Norwegian Championship and Cup double.
