= Gustav Rydergård =

Swedish handball player (born 1984)

Personal information
- Full name: Frej Gustav Rydergård
- Nationality: Swedish
- Born: 9 July 1984 (age 42) Falun, Sweden
- Height: 1.98 m (6 ft 6 in)

Sport
- Sport: Handball
- Position: Defender / Line Player

Senior clubs
- Years: Team
- 2006–2009: Alingsås HK
- 2009–2014: TSV Hannover-Burgdorf
- 2014–2015: CS Dinamo București
- 2015–2017: TBV Lemgo
- 2017–2019: TSG Altenhagen-Heepen
- 2019–2020: AIK Handboll

Frej Gustav Rydergård (born 9 July 1984 in Falun) is a Swedish former handballer.

== Achievements ==
- Elitserien:
  - Winner: 2009

== Individual awards ==
- Elitserien Best Defensive Player: 2008, 2009
