= HØJ Elite (men's handball) =

Danish men's handball club

HØJ Elite Men
- Full name: HØJ Elitehåndbold
- Short name: HØJ
- Founded: 2014; 12 years ago
- Arena: Ølstykke-Hallen, Ølstykke
- Capacity: 500
- President: Lars Vinther
- Head coach: Vacant
- League: 1st Division
- 2025–26: 13th (relegated)
- Club colours
Home	Away

Location of HØJ

HØJ Elite Men is a men's handball club based in Ølstykke and Jyllinge, Denmark. As of the 2024–25 season, the team competes men's Håndboldligaen, the top division.

== History ==
The elite team is part of the association 'HØJ Håndbold', which was founded on 7 January 1995 by a merger of Ølstykke Handball Association and Jyllinge-Gundsømagle Idrætsforening's Handball Department. In the spring of 2014, the elite department was established as 'HØJ Elite'. In the 2021–22 season, the team played in the promotion play-offs for the Danish Men's Handball League. However, they lost the final matches against TTH Holstebro. In the 2024-25 season, they were promoted to the Herrehåndboldligaen, winning 44 of 48 available points in the 1st Division. The women's team was also promoted the very same season.

After their promotion the club signed a contract to rent the yet-to-be-built Multiarenaen in Ølstykke, as their old court Ølstykke-Hallen did not live up to the requirements in the Danish top flight.

In the 2025-26 season, the club fired head coach Stian Tønnesen after a 15 goal defeat to GOG Håndbold, which were called 'among the worst in club history'. Despite big investments in the player squad, at the end of the season, they finished second-to-last in the relegation playoff and thus had to meet KIF Kolding in the relegation play-off, which they lost in three matches.

== Arena ==
- Name: Ølstykke-Hallen
- Capacity: 500
- City: Ølstykke, Egedal Municipality
- Address: Tranekærvej 1, 3650 Ølstykke

== Team ==
=== Current squad ===
Squad for the 2026–27 season.

Goalkeepers

- 16 (Denmark) Jannick Green
- 98 (Germany) Till Klimpke

Wingers
LW

- 14 (Sweden) Hampus Wanne
- 15 (United States) Lukas Karlskov

RW

- 17 (Denmark) Marius Pihl Ptak
- 26 (Sweden) Valter Chrintz
- 74 (Sweden) Oskar Andreasson

Line players

- 22 (Sweden) Kassem Awad
- 44 (Norway) Thomas Solstad
- 47 (Faroe Islands) Ísak Jógvan Djurhuus Vedelsbøl

Back players
LB

- 4 (Denmark) Lauge Hemmingsen
- 10 (Denmark) Lucas Garsdal
- 11 (Denmark) Lasse Andersson
- 28 (Sweden) Jonathan Svensson

CB

- 21 (Denmark) Marius Winckler Nørsøller
- 24 (Sweden) Linus Arnesson
- 94 (Denmark) Mads Bøgh Johannesen

RB

- 7 (Norway) Simen Schønningsen
- 27 (Sweden) Andreas Lang

=== Transfers ===
Transfers for the 2027–28 season

Joining

- (Norway) André Kristensen (GK) (from (Portugal) Sporting CP)
- (Sweden) Emil Mellegård (LW) (from (France) Paris Saint-Germain)
- (Sweden) Albin Lagergren (RB) (from (Germany) SC Magdeburg) ?
- (Norway) Kasper Lien (RW) (from (Germany) TVB Stuttgart)

Leaving

- (Germany) Till Klimpke (GK)
- (Sweden) Kassem Awad (P)

=== Transfer History ===
Transfers for the 2026–27 season

- (Denmark) Jannick Green (GK) from (France) Paris Saint-Germain
- (Denmark) Lasse Andersson (LB) from (Germany) Füchse Berlin
- (Denmark) Marius Nørsøller (CB) on loan from (Denmark) Skjern Håndbold
- (Sweden) Andreas Lang (RB) from (France) Saint-Raphael Var Handball
- (Sweden) Valter Chrintz (RW) from (Germany) Füchse Berlin
- (Sweden) Oskar Andreasson (RW) from (Sweden) Eskilstuna Guif
- (Norway) Thomas Solstad (LP) from (Germany) TSV Hannover-Burgdorf
- (Faroe Islands) Ísak Vedelsbøl (LP) from (Sweden) IK Sävehof

Leaving

- (Norway) Emil Kheri Imsgard (GK) to (Denmark) Nordsjælland Håndbold
- (Denmark) Michael Damgaard (LB) to (United States) Los Angeles THC
- (Sweden) Niclas Fingren (LB) to (Sweden) HF Karlskrona
- (Denmark) Jonathan Mollerup (RB) to (Denmark) Mors-Thy Håndbold
- (Denmark) Tobias Nielsen (RW) loan back to (Denmark) Aalborg Håndbold
- (Denmark) Hans Lindberg (RW) (retires)
- (Norway) Tom Kåre Nikolaisen (P) to ?
- (Denmark) Andreas Johann Nielsen (P) to ?
- (Denmark) Mikkel Olsen (P) to (Switzerland) Kadetten Schaffhausen

=== Staff ===
Pos.	Name
Head Coach	(Norway) Stian Tønnesen
Assistant Coach	(Sweden) Patrik Liljestrand
Goalkeeping coach	(Denmark) Peter Nørklit
Team Leader	(Denmark) Per Svenningsen
Team Leader	(Denmark) Helene Rasmussen
Team Leader	(Denmark) Ulrik Stevenius
Team Leader	(Denmark) Chrisina Jarkass
Physical coach	(Denmark) Thor Aarøe Mørck

== Kit manufacturers ==
- (Sweden) Craft Sportswear

=== Notable former players ===
- (Denmark) Martin Søborg Rasmussen
- (Denmark) Mathias Nikolajsen
- (Denmark) Tobias Kildegaard
- (Denmark) Karl Albert
- (Denmark) Hakan Sahin
- (Denmark) Victor Parbst
- (Denmark) Michael Damgaard
- (Denmark) Jonathan Mollerup
- (Denmark) Tobias Nielsen
- (Denmark) Hans Lindberg
- (Denmark) Andreas Johann Nielsen
- (Denmark) Mikkel Olsen
- (Faroe Islands) Pauli Jacobsen
- (Norway) Emil Kheri Imsgard
- (Norway) Tom Kåre Nikolaisen
- (Switzerland) Tobias Wetzel
- (Sweden) Emil Mellegård
- (Sweden) Niclas Fingren
