= Csaba Szücs =

Slovak handball player (born 1987)

Csaba Szűcs
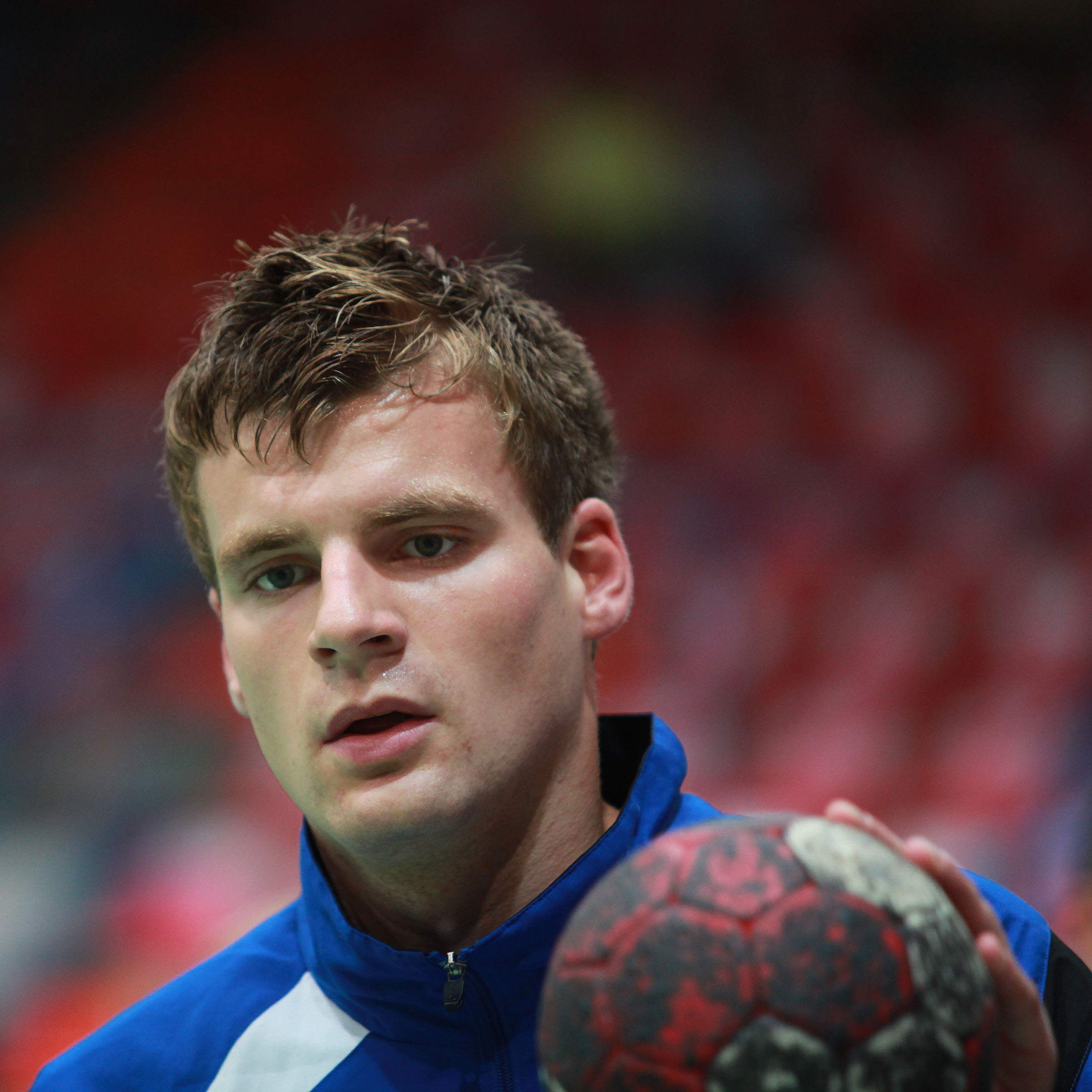

Personal information
- Nationality: Slovak
- Born: 28 July 1987 (age 39) Košice, Czechoslovakia
- Height: 2.03 m (6 ft 8 in)

Sport
- Sport: Handball
- Position: Left back
- Current club: Bergischer HC
- Number: 20
National team
Years	Team	Apps	(Gls)
2008–	Slovakia	53	(99)

Csaba Szücs (Hungarian: Szűcs Csaba; born 28 July 1987) is a Slovak handball player, belonging to the Hungarian minority. He currently plays for Bergischer HC and the Slovakia national team.
