= Zubří (disambiguation) =

Zubří is a town in the Zlín Region of the Czech Republic.

Zubří may also refer to:

- Zubří (Žďár nad Sázavou District), a municipality and village in the Vysočina Region of the Czech Republic
- HC Zubří, Czech handball club
- Zubří, a village and part of Trhová Kamenice, Czech Republic
- Zubří nature reserve in Chrudim District, Czech Republic
