= Prostřední Bečva =

- Municipality
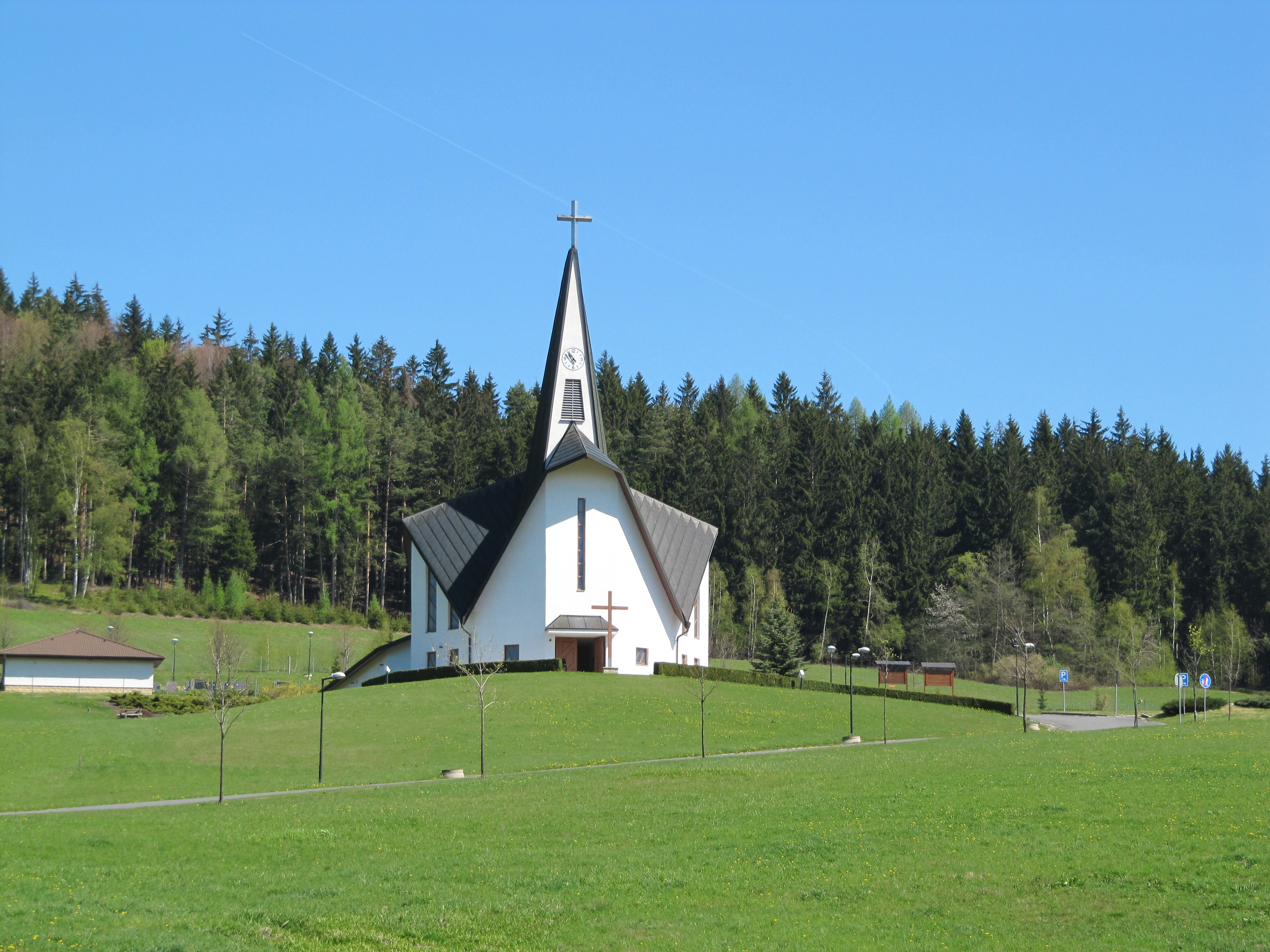
- Church of Saint Zdislava

- Flag Coat of arms

- Location in the Czech Republic
- Coordinates: 49°26′10″N 18°15′7″E
- Country: Czech Republic
- Region: Zlín
- District: Vsetín
- Founded: 1703

Area
  - Total: 23.47 km^{2} (9.06 sq mi)
- Elevation: 470 m (1,540 ft)

Population (2026-01-01)
  - Total: 1,825
  - Density: 77.76/km^{2} (201.4/sq mi)
- Time zone: UTC+1 (CET)
  - Summer (DST): UTC+2 (CEST)
- Postal code: 756 56
- Website: www.prostrednibecva.cz

Prostřední Bečva (Czech pronunciation: [ˈprostr̝̊ɛdɲiː ˈbɛtʃva]) is a municipality and village in Vsetín District in the Zlín Region of the Czech Republic. It has about 1,800 inhabitants. The municipality is located on the Rožnovská Bečva River.

Prostřední Bečva is known for the Pustevny mountain saddle with several Art Nouveau folk buildings, and this area is protected as a national cultural monument.

== Etymology ==
The name means 'middle Bečva'. It refers to its location between Horní Bečva and Dolní Bečva.

== Geography ==
Prostřední Bečva is located about 21 kilometres (13 mi) northeast of Vsetín and 47 km (29 mi) northeast of Zlín. The built-up area is situated in the valley of the Rožnovská Bečva River.

The southern part of the municipal territory with the village proper lies in the Rožnov Furrow valley. The northern part lies in the Moravian-Silesian Beskids. The municipal border leads over the peaks of several important mountains, including Čertův mlýn at 1,206 metres (3,957 ft), Radegast at 1,106 metres (3,629 ft), Tanečnice at 1,084 metres (3,556 ft), Skalka at 1,037 metres (3,402 ft), and over the Pustevny mountain saddle at 1,017 metres (3,337 ft).

== History ==
Prostřední Bečva was founded in 1703.

== Demographics ==
Historical population

| Year | Pop. | ±% |
|---|---|---|
| 1869 | 1,725 | — |
| 1880 | 1,650 | −4.3% |
| 1890 | 1,399 | −15.2% |
| 1900 | 1,678 | +19.9% |
| 1910 | 1,598 | −4.8% |

| Year | Pop. | ±% |
|---|---|---|
| 1921 | 1,482 | −7.3% |
| 1930 | 1,641 | +10.7% |
| 1950 | 1,691 | +3.0% |
| 1961 | 1,863 | +10.2% |
| 1970 | 1,815 | −2.6% |

| Year | Pop. | ±% |
|---|---|---|
| 1980 | 1,612 | −11.2% |
| 1991 | 1,568 | −2.7% |
| 2001 | 1,668 | +6.4% |
| 2011 | 1,672 | +0.2% |
| 2021 | 1,711 | +2.3% |

Source: Censuses

== Transport ==
The I/35 road (part of the European route E442) from Valašské Meziříčí to the Czech–Slovak border runs through the municipality.

== Sights ==
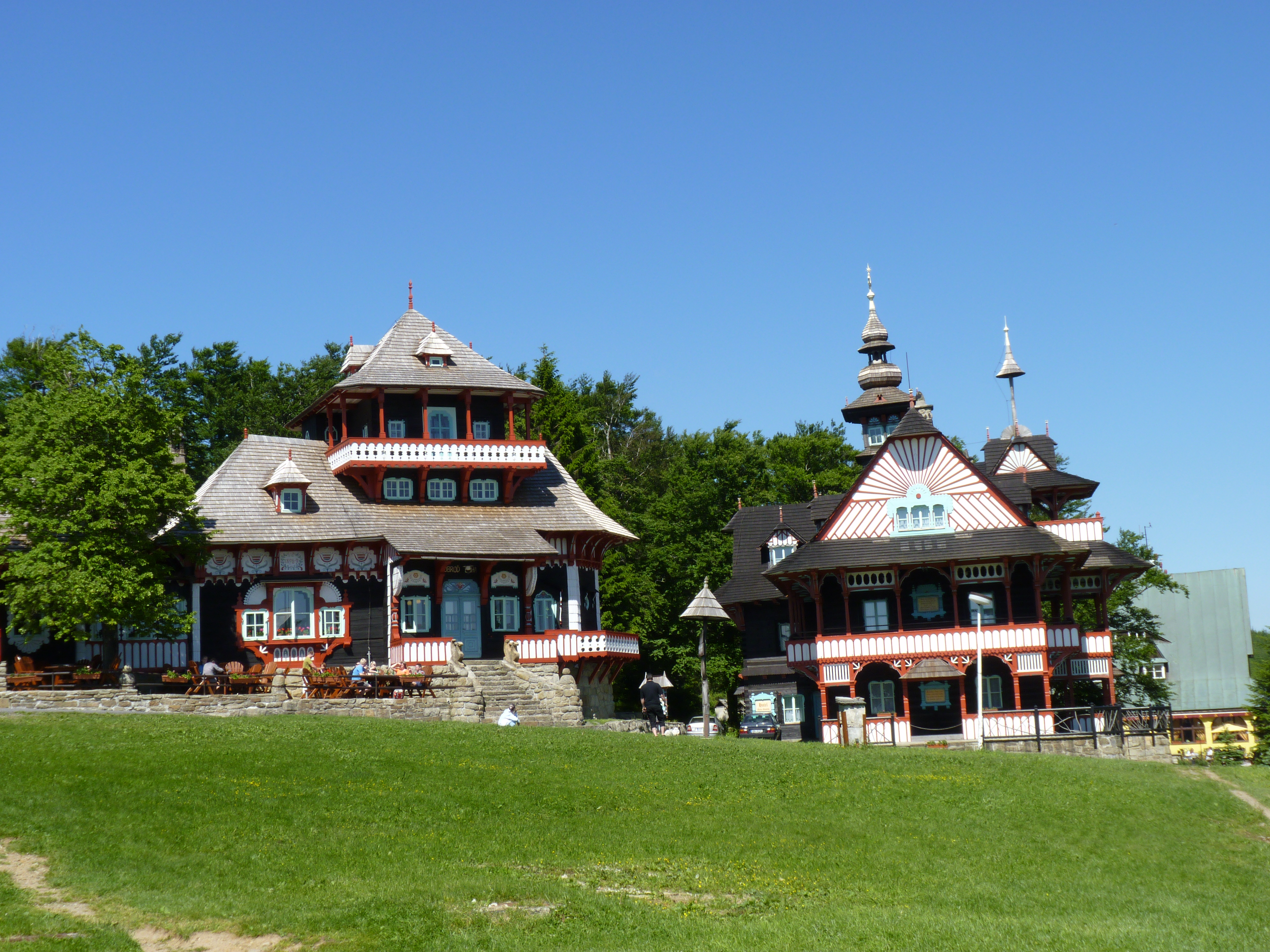
Libušín and Maměnka cottages

Pustevny mountain saddle is famous for Libušín and Maměnka mountain cottages. These Art Nouveau folk buildings were built by Dušan Jurkovič in 1898. A wooden belfry in Pustevny was also designed by Jurkovič. The Pustevny area is protected as a national cultural monument.

The main landmark of the village centre is the Church of Saint Zdislava. It is a modern church, built in 2001.

== Notable people ==
- Helena Zeťová (1980–2024), singer; lived and died here
