= Jakub Krupa =

Czech handball player

Personal information
- Born: 19 June 1985 (age 41) Valašské Meziříčí, Czechoslovakia
- Height: 1.94 m (6 ft 4 1/2 in)

Sport
- Sport: Handball
- Position: Goalkeeper
- Current club: SK hawks
- Number: 1

Senior clubs
- Years: Team
- -2008: (Czech Republic) HC Gurmány Zubří
- 2008-: (Slovakia) HT Tatran Prešov

Jakub Krupa (born 19 June 1985) is a Czech handball player, currently playing for HT Tatran Prešov in the Slovak Extraliga. He also plays for the Czech national handball team. He also played for HC Gurmány Zubří.
