= Krhová =

- Municipality
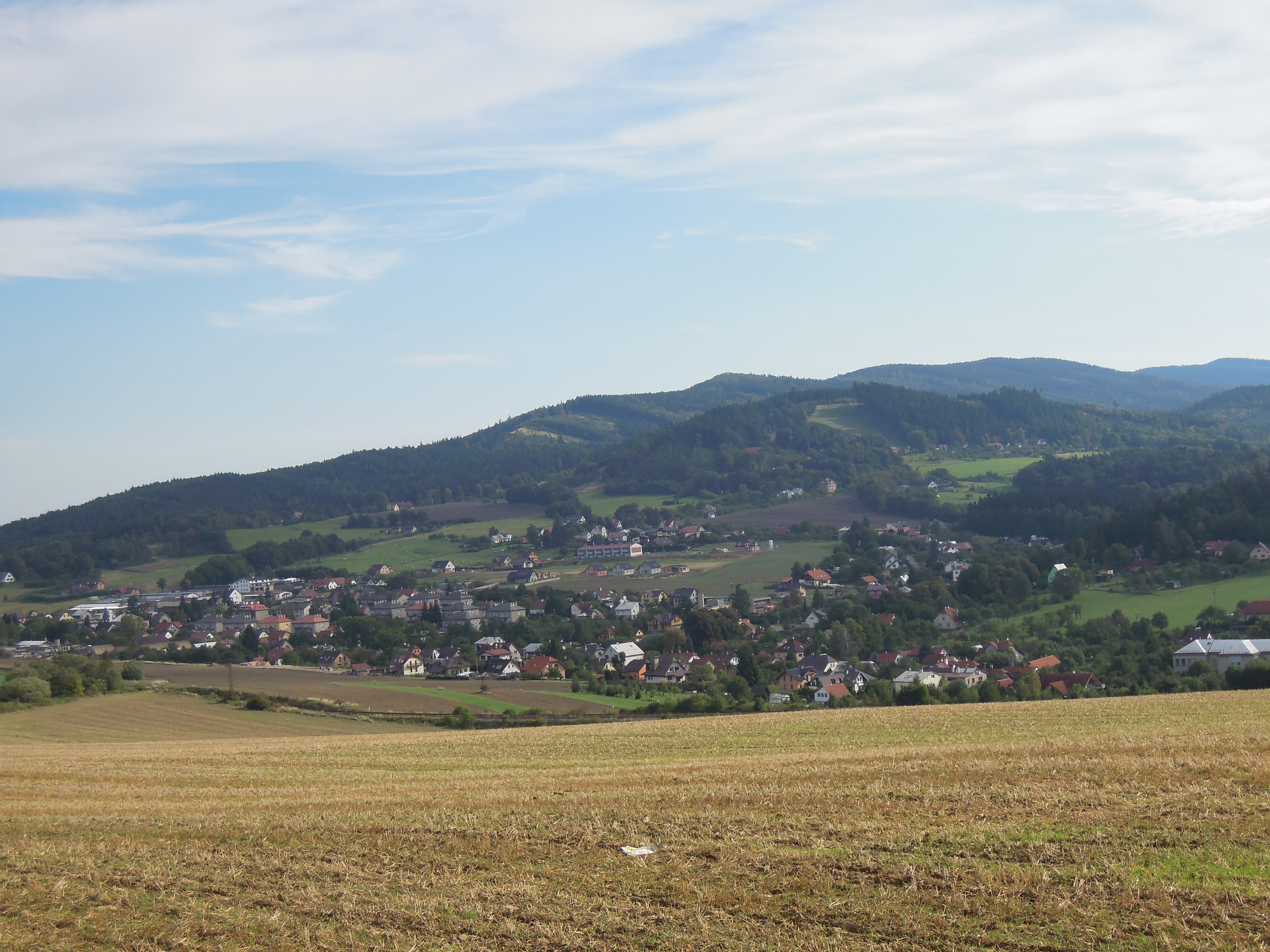
- View from the west

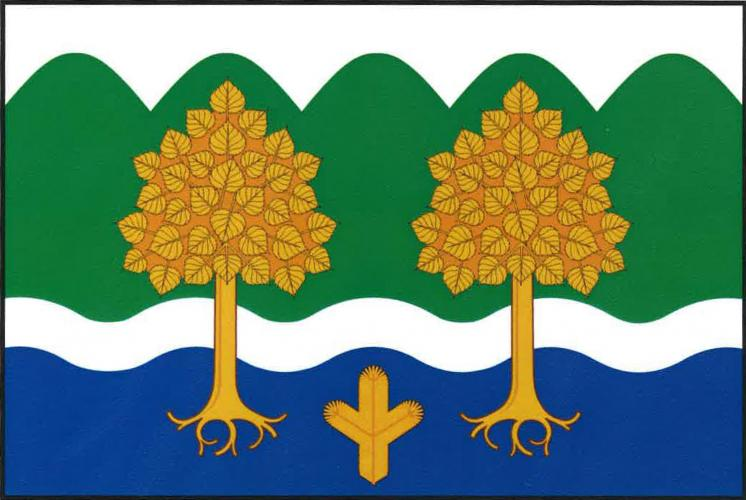
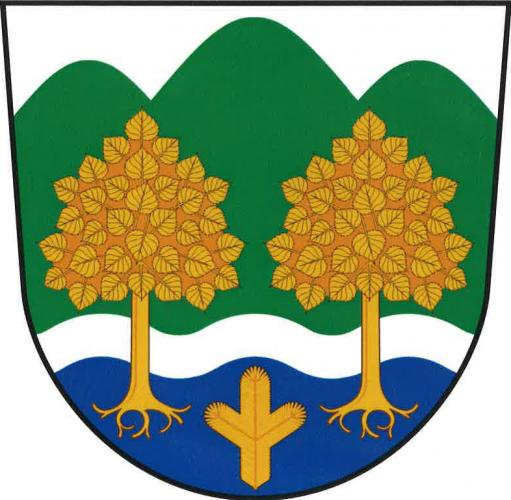
- Flag Coat of arms

- Location in the Czech Republic
- Coordinates: 49°29′30″N 18°0′1″E
- Country: Czech Republic
- Region: Zlín
- District: Vsetín
- First mentioned: 1442

Area
  - Total: 8.05 km^{2} (3.11 sq mi)
- Elevation: 312 m (1,024 ft)

Population (2026-01-01)
  - Total: 2,165
  - Density: 269/km^{2} (697/sq mi)
- Time zone: UTC+1 (CET)
  - Summer (DST): UTC+2 (CEST)
- Postal code: 756 63
- Website: www.krhova.cz

Krhová (German: Krhowa) is a municipality and village in Vsetín District in the Zlín Region of the Czech Republic. It has about 2,200 inhabitants.

== Geography ==
Krhová is located about 16 kilometres (10 mi) north of Vsetín and 39 km (24 mi) southwest of Ostrava. The southern part of the municipality lies in the Rožnov Furrow valley and the northern part lies in the Moravian-Silesian Beskids mountain range. The highest point is at 635 m (2,083 ft) above sea level. The stream Srní potok flows through the municipality.

== History ==
The first written mention of Krhová is from 1442.

Krhová was a municipal part of the town of Valašské Meziříčí until a vote to separate the village was held on 21 April 2012, in which the majority voted in favor. On 1 January 2013, Krhová officially became an independent municipality.

== Demographics ==
Historical population

Year	Pop.	±%
1869	1,046	—
1880	1,161	+11.0%
1890	1,317	+13.4%
1900	1,450	+10.1%
1910	1,733	+19.5%

Year	Pop.	±%
1921	1,696	−2.1%
1930	1,834	+8.1%
1950	1,539	−16.1%
1961	1,719	+11.7%
1970	1,606	−6.6%

Year	Pop.	±%
1980	1,752	+9.1%
1991	1,704	−2.7%
2001	1,787	+4.9%
2011	1,957	+9.5%
2021	2,020	+3.2%

Source: Censuses

== Transport ==
The I/35 road (part of the European route E442) from Valašské Meziříčí to the Czech–Slovak border in Bílá runs along the southern municipal border. The I/57 road (the section from Vsetín to Nový Jičín) runs along the western municipal border.

Krhová is located on the railway line Rožnov pod Radhoštěm–Kojetín.

== Sights ==
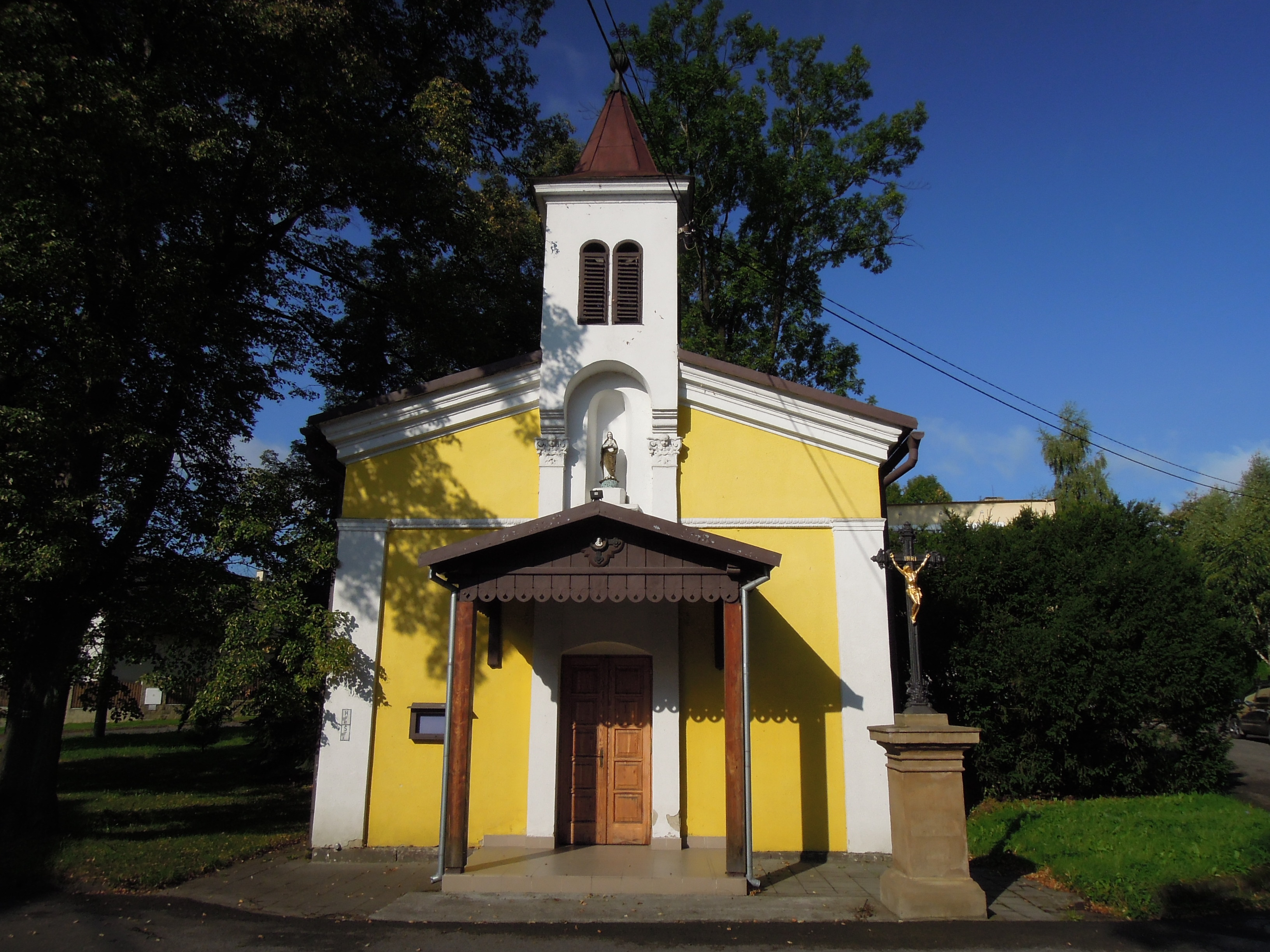
Chapel of Saints Cyril and Methodius

The only protected cultural monument in the municipality is a wooden carved crucifix from 1837. The main landmark of Krhová is the Chapel of Saints Cyril and Methodius.

== Notable people ==
- Rudolf Pernický (1915–2005), military leader
