= Josef Vávra =

Czech ice hockey player

- Born: 17 March 1984 (age 42) Valašské Meziříčí, Czechoslovakia
- Height: 1.83 m (6 ft 0 in)
- Weight: 83 kg (183 lb; 13 st 1 lb)
- Position: Left wing
- Shot: Left
- Played for: VHK Vsetín
- NHL draft: 246th overall, 2002; Ottawa Senators
- Playing career: 2002–2006

Josef Vávra (born 17 March 1984) is a Czech former professional ice hockey left winger.

Vávra was selected in the eighth round, 246th overall by the Ottawa Senators in 2002 NHL entry draft. He played for the Tri-City Americans and the Kootenay Ice of the jWestern Hockey League before playing four games for VHK Vsetín in the Czech Extraliga. He later played for HC Sareza Ostrava in the Czech 1.liga as well as for HC Valašské Meziříčí of the Czech 2.liga.

Vávra retired from ice hockey in 2006 to work in his father's business. His teammate from age ten through his time with VHK Vsetin, Robin Kovář, said about Vávra's retirement, "I think he made a wrong decision to quit, but that's life."

== Career statistics ==
| | | | Regular season | | | | | Playoffs |
| Season | Team | League | GP | G | A | Pts | PIM | GP | G | A | Pts | PIM |
|---|---|---|---|---|---|---|---|---|---|---|---|---|
| 1999–2000 | HC Slovnaft Vsetín | CZE U18 | 48 | | | | 28 | 2 | 2 | 2 | 4 | 0 |
| 2000–01 | HC Slovnaft Vsetín | CZE U18 | 32 | 22 | 33 | 55 | 99 | — | — | — | — | — |
| 2000–01 | HC Slovnaft Vsetín | CZE U20 | 9 | 0 | 2 | 2 | 2 | 2 | 0 | 0 | 0 | 0 |
| 2000–01 | HC Slovnaft Vsetín | CZE U18 | 32 | 22 | 33 | 55 | 99 | — | — | — | — | — |
| 2001–02 | HC Vsetín | CZE U20 | 35 | 3 | 12 | 15 | 39 | — | — | — | — | — |
| 2002–03 | Tri–City Americans | WHL | 37 | 2 | 5 | 7 | 26 | — | — | — | — | — |
| 2003–04 | Kootenay Ice | WHL | 18 | 2 | 4 | 6 | 24 | — | — | — | — | — |
| 2003–04 | Vsetínská hokejová | CZE U20 | 14 | 1 | 2 | 3 | 68 | — | — | — | — | — |
| 2003–04 | Vsetínská hokejová | ELH | 4 | 0 | 0 | 0 | 0 | — | — | — | — | — |
| 2004–05 | HC Sareza Ostrava | CZE.2 | 11 | 0 | 0 | 0 | 2 | — | — | — | — | — |
| 2004–05 | TJ Valašské Meziříčí | CZE.3 | 27 | 1 | 7 | 8 | 50 | — | — | — | — | — |
| 2005–06 | TJ Valašské Meziříčí | CZE.3 | 1 | 0 | 0 | 0 | 0 | — | — | — | — | — |
| ELH totals | | | 4 | 0 | 0 | 0 | 0 | — | — | — | — | — |
