= Štěpán Zeman =

Czech handball player

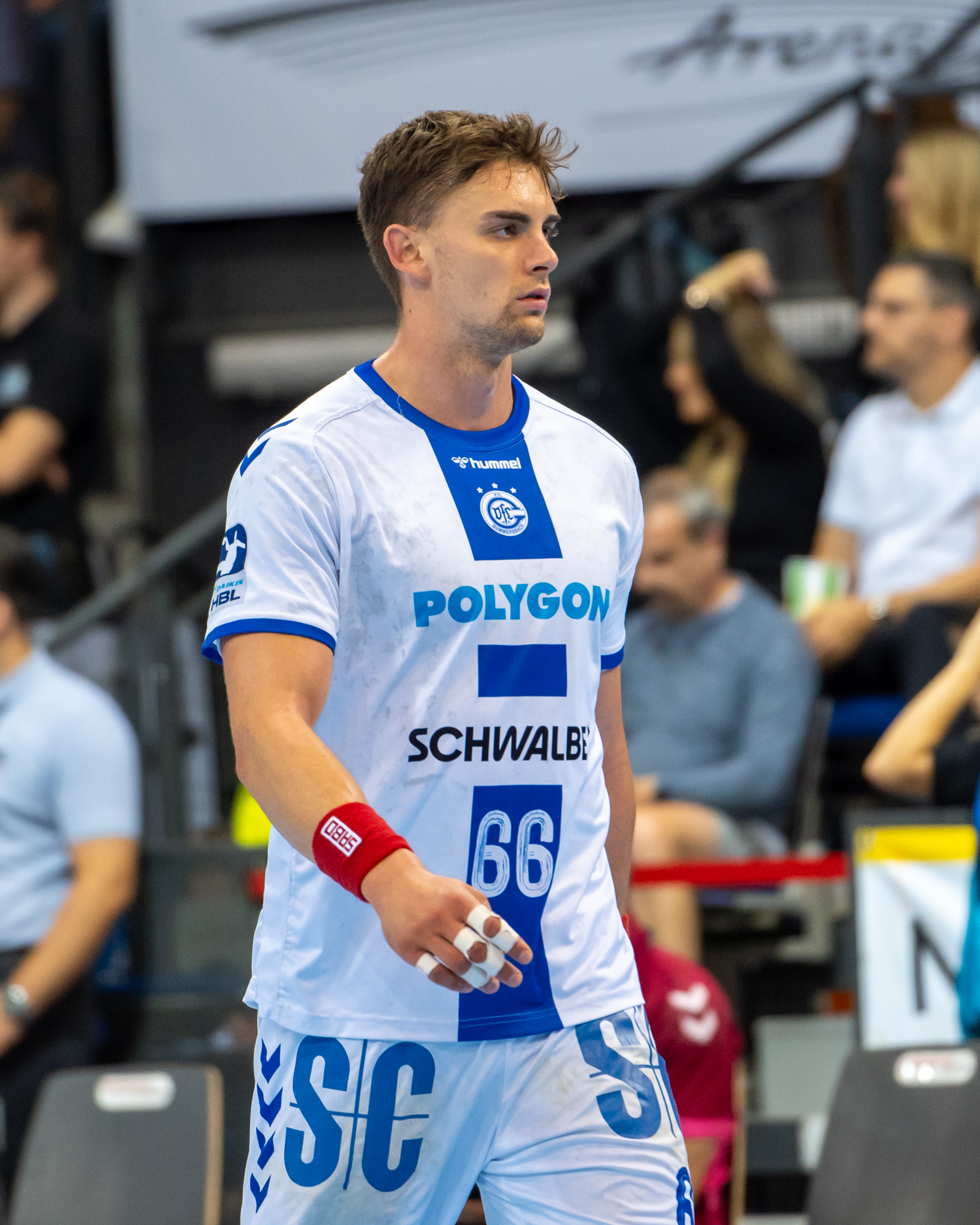

Personal information
- Nationality: Czech
- Born: 9 May 1997 (age 29)
- Height: 2 .02 m

Sport
- Sport: Handball
- Position: Pivot
- Current club: VfL Gummersbach
- Number: 66

Senior clubs
- Years: Team
- –2019: HC Zubří
- 2019–2021: HSC 2000 Coburg
- 2021–: VfL Gummersbach
National team
Years	Team	Apps	(Gls)
2017	Czech Republic	70	(58)
- Updated on 18 July 2025

Štěpán Zeman (born 9 May 1997) is a Czech handball player for VfL Gummersbach and the Czech national team.

He participated at the 2018 European Men's Handball Championship and the 2020 European Men's Handball Championship. At the 2024 European Men's Handball Championship he finished 15th with Czechia, and at the 2025 World Men's Handball Championship he finished 19th.

Zeman was formerly a handball player for HC Zubří and HSC 2000 Coburg. In 2021 he joined VfL Gummersbach, and in his first season he helped the team getting promoted to the Handball-Bundesliga.
