= HC Zubří =

Czech handball club

HC ROBE Zubří
- Full name: Handball Club Zubří z.s.
- Short name: HC Zubří
- Founded: 1926; 100 years ago
- Arena: ROBE Aréna, Zubří
- Capacity: 1,200
- President: René Dořičák
- Head coach: Ondřej Mika
- League: Chance Extraliga
- Club colours
Home	Away

Handball Club Zubří or HC ROBE Zubří is a Czech handball club based in Zubří, Czech Republic.

Location of HC Zubří

== History ==
The club was founded in 1926. In 1957 Hc Zubří played the first international match, lost 15:17 against ASK Vorwärts Berlin. Club advanced to the second league in 1958 and in 1960 Czech Handball Extraliga. Club played in the EHF Champions league and EHF Cup in 1995, 1996, and 1997. The club plays its domestic matches in the 1,200-seat ROBE Arena, which traditionally creates an excellent spectator atmosphere with high attendance.

== Crest, colours, supporters ==
=== Club crest ===
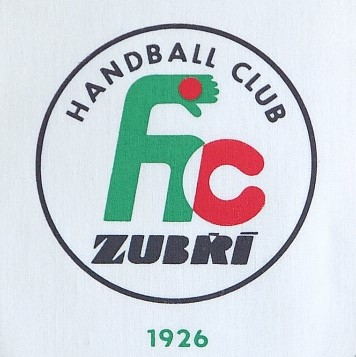
Old Logo
(90s)

New Logo
(present)

=== Kit manufacturers ===
Period	Kit manufacturer
– 2011	(Germany) Adidas
2011 – 2019	(Sweden) Salming
2019 – present	(Japan) Mizuno

=== Kits ===
HOME
2010–11	2011–13	2014–16	2016–18	2020–21	2021–22	2022–24

AWAY
2010–11	2013–14	2015–16	2016–18	2020–22	2023–24

== Sports Hall information ==
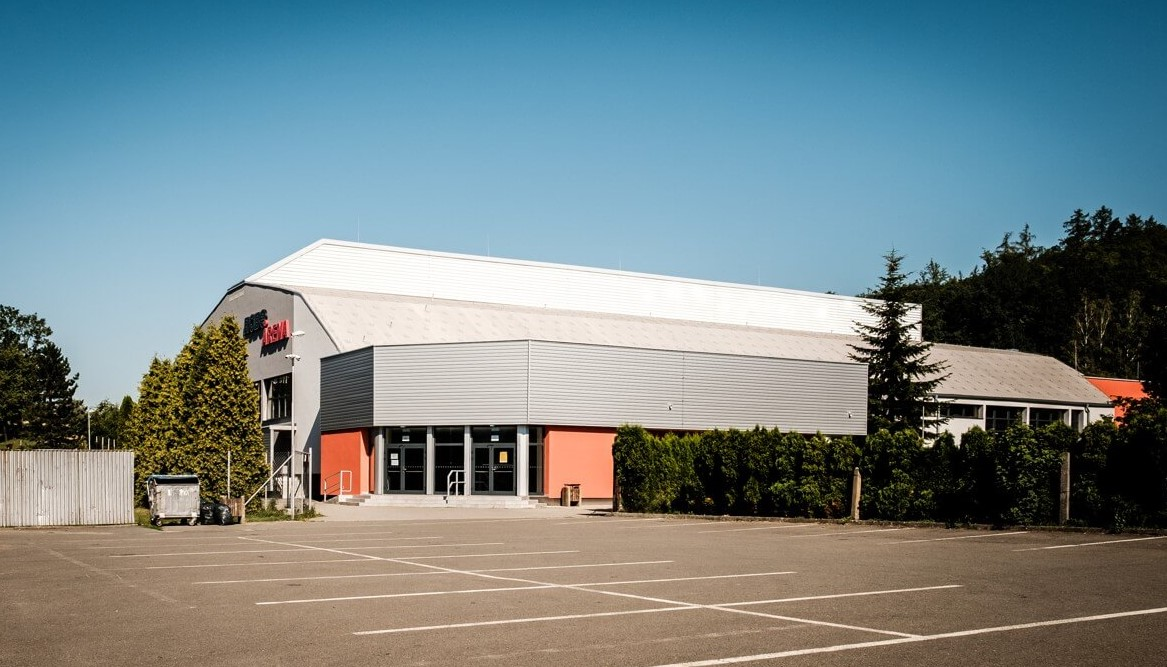
Home hall: ROBE Aréna

- Name: – ROBE Aréna
- City: – Zubří
- Capacity: – 1200
- Address: – Hlavní 492, 756 54 Zubří, Czech Republic

== Management ==
Position	Name
President	(Czech Republic) René Dořičák
Head coach	(Czech Republic) Ondřej Mika
Manager	(Czech Republic) Michal Balhárek
Sports Director	(Czech Republic) Josef Mazač

== Team ==
=== Current squad ===
Squad for the 2023–24 season

HC Zubří

Goalkeepers

- 1 (Czech Republic) Jakub Krupa
- 12 (Czech Republic) Milan Malina
- 16 (Czech Republic) Pavel Dufek
- 97 (Czech Republic) Štěpán Krůpa

Left Wingers

- 31 (Czech Republic) Tomáš Mičkal
- 32 (Czech Republic) Jakub Cibulec
- 37 (Czech Republic) Michal Hub

Right Wingers

- 5 (Czech Republic) Pavel Přikryl
- 74 (Czech Republic) Pavel Bajer

Line Players

- 19 (Montenegro) Bogdan Đurović
- 24 (Czech Republic) Lukáš Hybner
- 28 (Czech Republic) Adam Přerovský
- 45 (Czech Republic) Filip Šišak

Central Backs

- 23 (Czech Republic) Ondřej Mika
- 34 (Czech Republic) Dušan Palát
- 47 (Czech Republic) Ondřej Krupa

Left Backs

- 9 (Czech Republic) Pavel Mancl
- 14 (Czech Republic) Matěj Havran
- 21 (Czech Republic) Tomáš Randýsek
- 35 (Czech Republic) Marek Pšenica
- 58 (Czech Republic) Tomáš Kyryljuk

Right Backs

- 8 (Poland) Oliwier Kaminski
- 11 (Slovakia) Mikuláš Kucsera

=== Technical staff ===
- Head Coach: (Slovakia) Peter Dávid
- Fitness Coach: (Czech Republic) Jakub Bambuch
- Physiotherapist: (Czech Republic) Peter Pecho
- Physiotherapist: (Czech Republic) Denisa Pechová
- Masseur: (Czech Republic) Petr Kocurek

=== Transfers ===
Transfers for the 2026–27 season

Joining

Leaving

- (Czech Republic) Dušan Palát (CB) to (France) US Ivry Handball
- (Czech Republic) Lukáš Mořkovský (CB) to (Poland) Wybrzeże Gdańsk

=== Transfer History ===
Transfers for the 2025–26 season

Joining

- (Czech Republic) Lukáš Mořkovský (CB) from (Poland) Górnik Zabrze
- (Czech Republic) Filip Matouš (RW) from (Czech Republic) HBC Jičín

Leaving

Transfers for the 2023–24 season

Joining

- (Montenegro) Bogdan Đurović (LP) from (North Macedonia) RK Struga
- (Slovakia) Mikuláš Kucsera (RB) from (Slovakia) TJ Štart Nové Zámky
- (Poland) Oliwier Kaminski (RB) on loan from (Poland) Wisła Płock

Leaving

- (Czech Republic) Miroslav Jurka (RW) to (Czech Republic) HC Zlín
- (Czech Republic) Lukáš Mořkovský (LB) to (Poland) Górnik Zabrze
- (Czech Republic) David Mazurek (RB) to (Hungary) Csurgói KK
- (Czech Republic) Bohumil Možíš (RW) to (Czech Republic) Házená Velká Bystřice
- (Czech Republic) Tomáš Dvorský (GK) to (Czech Republic) Tatran Litovel
- (Czech Republic) Miroslav Pšenica (LW) to (Czech Republic) KH Beech Vsetín
- (Czech Republic) Lukáš Weintritt (LP) to (Czech Republic) KH Beech Vsetín
- (Czech Republic) Petr Hlavenka (LP) to (Czech Republic) SHC Maloměřice Brno
- (Czech Republic) Bohdan Mizera (RW) to (Czech Republic) HK Lovosice

== Previous squads ==
2021–2022 Team
Shirt No	Nationality	Player	Birth Date	Position
1	Czech Republic	Šimon Mizera	29 December 2000 (age 25)	Goalkeeper
2	Czech Republic	Jiří Dokoupil	22 September 1999 (age 27)	Line Player
4	Czech Republic	David Michálek	13 May 2002 (age 24)	Left Winger
5	Czech Republic	Pavel Přikryl	6 April 1993 (age 33)	Right Winger
6	Czech Republic	Miroslav Pšenica	6 August 1995 (age 31)	Left Winger
9	Czech Republic	Pavel Mancl	8 February 2004 (age 22)	Left Back
10	Czech Republic	Lukáš Mořkovský	4 January 2002 (age 24)	Left Back
12	Czech Republic	Milan Malina	30 September 1987 (age 39)	Goalkeeper
14	Czech Republic	Matěj Havran	22 January 2002 (age 24)	Central Back
16	Czech Republic	Karel Čepica	22 February 2002 (age 24)	Goalkeeper
17	Czech Republic	Štěpán Fiala	29 July 2002 (age 24)	Line Player
18	Czech Republic	Ivan Jirák	24 July 2001 (age 25)	Line Player
19	Czech Republic	Miroslav Jurka	7 June 1987 (age 39)	Right Winger
23	Czech Republic	Ondřej Mika	19 May 1989 (age 37)	Central Back
24	Czech Republic	Lukáš Hybner	24 June 1999 (age 27)	Line Player
26	Czech Republic	David Mazurek	13 January 2002 (age 24)	Right Back
29	Czech Republic	Josef Dobeš	23 February 2001 (age 25)	Left Winger
31	Czech Republic	Tomáš Mičkal	2 March 1988 (age 38)	Left Winger
34	Czech Republic	Dušan Palát	2 April 2001 (age 25)	Central Back
44	Czech Republic	Bohumil Možíš	3 June 2002 (age 24)	Right Winger
74	Czech Republic	Pavel Bajer	2 May 2002 (age 24)	Right Winger
88	Czech Republic	Antonín Vodička	26 January 2002 (age 24)	Central Back
97	Czech Republic	Štepán Krupa	28 July 1997 (age 29)	Goalkeeper
99	Czech Republic	Bohdan Mizera	29 December 2000 (age 25)	Right Back

2011–2012 Team
Shirt No	Nationality	Player	Birth Date	Position
2	Czech Republic	Peter Šlachta	1 January 1993 (age 33)	Line Player
3	Czech Republic	Martin Stržínek	12 May 1983 (age 43)	Right Back
4	Slovakia	Jozef Hanták	19 December 1987 (age 38)	Central Back
5	Czech Republic	Rostislav Dobeš	30 October 1980 (age 45)	Left Back
6	Czech Republic	Lukáš Vaclav	10 January 1994 (age 32)	Central Back
8	Czech Republic	Libor Horut	20 February 1991 (age 35)	Central Back
10	Czech Republic	Marek Třeštík	22 June 1989 (age 37)	Line Player
11	Czech Republic	Štepán Randýsek	16 September 1985 (age 41)	Right Back
12	Czech Republic	Milan Malina	30 September 1987 (age 39)	Goalkeeper
13	Czech Republic	Matej Šustaček	7 December 1990 (age 35)	Central Back
14	Czech Republic	Michal Kasal	3 April 1994 (age 32)	Left Back
16	Czech Republic	Petr Orság	22 April 1989 (age 37)	Goalkeeper
18	Czech Republic	Jakub Koleček	19 October 1984 (age 41)	Goalkeeper
19	Czech Republic	Miroslav Jurka	7 June 1987 (age 39)	Right Winger
20	Czech Republic	Tomáš Bechný	10 September 1984 (age 42)	Line Player
23	Czech Republic	Ondřej Mika	19 May 1989 (age 37)	Central Back
24	Czech Republic	Lukáš Mechyr	3 August 1988 (age 38)	Right Winger
25	Czech Republic	Michal Dědek	15 March 1987 (age 39)	Central Back
27	Czech Republic	Svatopluk Pernica	14 December 1984 (age 41)	Line Player
28	Czech Republic	Martin Vyjidak	1 February 1989 (age 37)	Left Back
29	Czech Republic	Vojtech Pernicky	6 June 1990 (age 36)	Left Winger
31	Czech Republic	Tomáš Mičkal	2 March 1988 (age 38)	Left Winger
35	Czech Republic	David Poloz	25 May 1994 (age 32)	Right Winger

2008–2009 Team
Shirt No	Nationality	Player	Birth Date	Position
1	Czech Republic	Tomáš Janků	3 August 1991 (age 35)	Goalkeeper
3	Czech Republic	Petr Kichner	10 January 1984 (age 42)	Right Back
5	Czech Republic	Robert Plšek	23 March 1984 (age 42)	Left Back
6	Czech Republic	Svatopluk Pernica	14 December 1984 (age 41)	Line Player
7	Czech Republic	Andrej Titkov	15 March 1969 (age 57)	Line Player
8	Czech Republic	Jakub Šíra	8 December 1988 (age 37)	Line Player
9	Czech Republic	Jakub Hrstka	17 March 1990 (age 36)	Left Winger
10	Czech Republic	Marek Třeštík	22 June 1989 (age 37)	Line Player
11	Czech Republic	Štepán Randýsek	16 September 1985 (age 41)	Right Back
12	Czech Republic	Milan Malina	30 September 1987 (age 39)	Goalkeeper
14	Czech Republic	Tomaš Riha	14 December 1984 (age 41)	Line Player
15	Czech Republic	Martin Hrstka	24 October 1985 (age 40)	Left Back
16	Czech Republic	Petr Orság	22 April 1989 (age 37)	Goalkeeper
18	Czech Republic	Tomáš Mičkal	2 March 1988 (age 38)	Left Winger
19	Czech Republic	Miroslav Jurka	7 June 1987 (age 39)	Right Winger
20	Czech Republic	Martin Vyjidak	1 February 1989 (age 37)	Left Back
21	Czech Republic	Tomáš Číp	5 October 1989 (age 37)	Right Winger
22	Czech Republic	Štěpán Krupa	14 March 1989 (age 37)	Left Back
23	Czech Republic	Ondřej Mika	19 May 1989 (age 37)	Central Back
77	Czech Republic	Miroslav Ondrej	7 March 1986 (age 40)	Left Winger

== Accomplishments ==
Czech Handball Extraliga:

- 3 x (gold) – 1995/96, 1996/97, 2011/12
- 6 x (silver) – 1994/95, 2005/06, 2006/07, 2007/08, 2008/09, 2009/10
- 6 x (bronze) – 1997/98, 2000/01, 2010/11, 2016/17, 2017/18, 2021/22

Winner of the Czech Handball cup:

- 2 x (gold) – 1996/1997, 2008/2009

== European Records ==
Season and Competition	Round	Club	Home	Away	Aggregate:
1995/96 EHF Cup	1/16	(Iceland) Vikingur Reykjavik	27-22	23-16	50-38
1995/96 EHF Cup	1/8	(Ukraine) Schachtroj Donetsk	22-18	13-33	35-51
1996/97 EHF Champions League	1/16	(Serbia) HC Red Star	23-24	26-28	49-52
1997/98 EHF Champions League	R3	(Romania) CS Dinamo Bukuresti	35-22	26-26	61-48
1997/98 EHF Champions League	Skupina D	(Hungary) Fotex KC Veszprém	24-30	22-31	4rd
1997/98 EHF Champions League	Skupina D	(Germany) TBV Lemgo	22-27	22-31	4rd
1997/98 EHF Champions League	Skupina D	(North Macedonia) Jafa Promet Resen	32-30	26-33	4rd
2006/07 EHF Cup	R1	Cyprus College	23-22	38-20	61-42
2006/07 EHF Cup	R2	(Romania) Energia Panduri L.Targu-Jiu	30-26	27-28	57-54
2006/07 EHF Cup	R3	(Russia) HC Lukoil - Dinamo Astrakhan	29-36	22-37	51-73
2007/08 EHF Cup Winners' Cup	R1	(Belarus) SKA Minsk	33-31	30-38	63-69
2008/09 EHF Cup Winners' Cup	R1	(Cyprus) SPE Strovolos	32-25	22-24	54-49
2008/09 EHF Cup Winners' Cup	R2	(Portugal) ABC de Braga	25-26	25-28	50-54
2010/11 EHF Cup	R2	(Norway) Drammen HK	34-29	36-44	70-73
2011/12 EHF Challenge Cup	R3	(Bosnia and Herzegovina) MRK GORAZDE	40-26	26-31	66-57
2011/12 EHF Challenge Cup	1/8	(Portugal) Sporting Lisabon	26-23	25-22	48-48
2020/21 EHF Cup	1/32	(Switzerland) TSV St. Otmar St. Gallen	wo	wo	wo
2020/21 EHF Cup	1/16	(Iceland) FH Hafnarfjordur	wo	wo	wo
2020/21 EHF Cup	1/8	(Slovakia) MŠK Považská Bystrica	29-22	23-28	52-50
2020/21 EHF Cup	1/4	(Slovenia) RK Gorenje Velenje	26-31	24-28	50-59
2021/22 EHF Cup	1/64	(Cyprus) APOEL HC	40-11	29-27	69-38
2021/22 EHF Cup	1/32	(Bulgaria) HC Osam Lovech	43-20	43-22	86-42
2021/22 EHF Cup	1/16	(Czech Republic) Talent Plzeň	32-28	27-35	59-63
2022/23 EHF Cup	1/64	(Turkey) Izmir BSB SK	40-29	46-27	86-56
2022/23 EHF Cup	1/32	(Norway) ØIF Arendal	26-36	20-34	46-70
2023/24 EHF Cup	1/64	(Czech Republic) SKKP Handball Brno	32-28	22-28	54-56

== EHF ranking ==
As of 23/11/2023

Rank	Team	Points
75	(Cyprus) Anorthosis Famagusta H.C.	70
76	(Hungary) Balatonfüredi KSE	70
77	(Estonia) Põlva Serviti	69
78	(Czech Republic) HC Zubří	69
79	(Russia) Chekhovskiye Medvedi	64
80	(Finland) Riihimäki Cocks	63
81	(Spain) CB Ademar León	63

== Former club members ==
=== Notable former players ===
- (Czech Republic) Tomáš Číp (2006–2011)
- (Czech Republic) Richard Hladký (1997–2001)
- (Czech Republic) Jakub Hrstka (2006–2011)
- (Czech Republic) Miroslav Jurka (2004–2013, 2019–2023)
- (Czech Republic) Michal Kasal (2009–2012)
- (Czech Republic) Stanislav Kašpárek (2011–2015)
- (Czech Republic) Jakub Krupa (2002–2008, 2021–)
- (Czech Republic) Pavel Mičkal (2001–2005)
- (Czech Republic) Tomáš Řezníček (2002–2005, 2014–2016, 2019–2020)
- (Czech Republic) Peter Šlachta (2011–2017)
- (Czech Republic) Štěpán Zeman (2016–2019)

=== Former coaches ===
Seasons	Coach	Country
2015–2018	Andrej Titkov	(Czech Republic)
2018–2020	Dušan Poloz	(Czech Republic)
2020–2021	Michal Tonar	(Czech Republic)
2021–2024	Peter Dávid	(Slovakia)
