= Miroslav Jurka =

Czech handball player (born 1987)

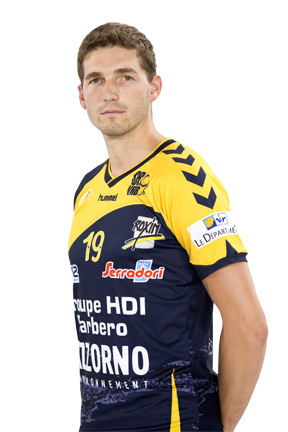

Personal information
- Nationality: Czech
- Born: 7 June 1987 (age 39) Valašské Meziříčí, Czechoslovakia
- Height: 1.89 m (6 ft 2 in)

Sport
- Sport: Handball
- Position: Right wing
- Current club: HC Robe Zubří
- Number: 19

Senior clubs
- Years: Team
- –: Saint-Raphaël Var Handball
- –: HC Robe Zubří
National team
Years	Team	Apps	(Gls)
2012-	Czech Republic	86	(171)

Miroslav Jurka (born 7 June 1987) is a Czech handball player for HC Robe Zubří and the Czech national team.

He also played for Saint-Raphaël Var Handball.
