= Rožnovská Bečva =

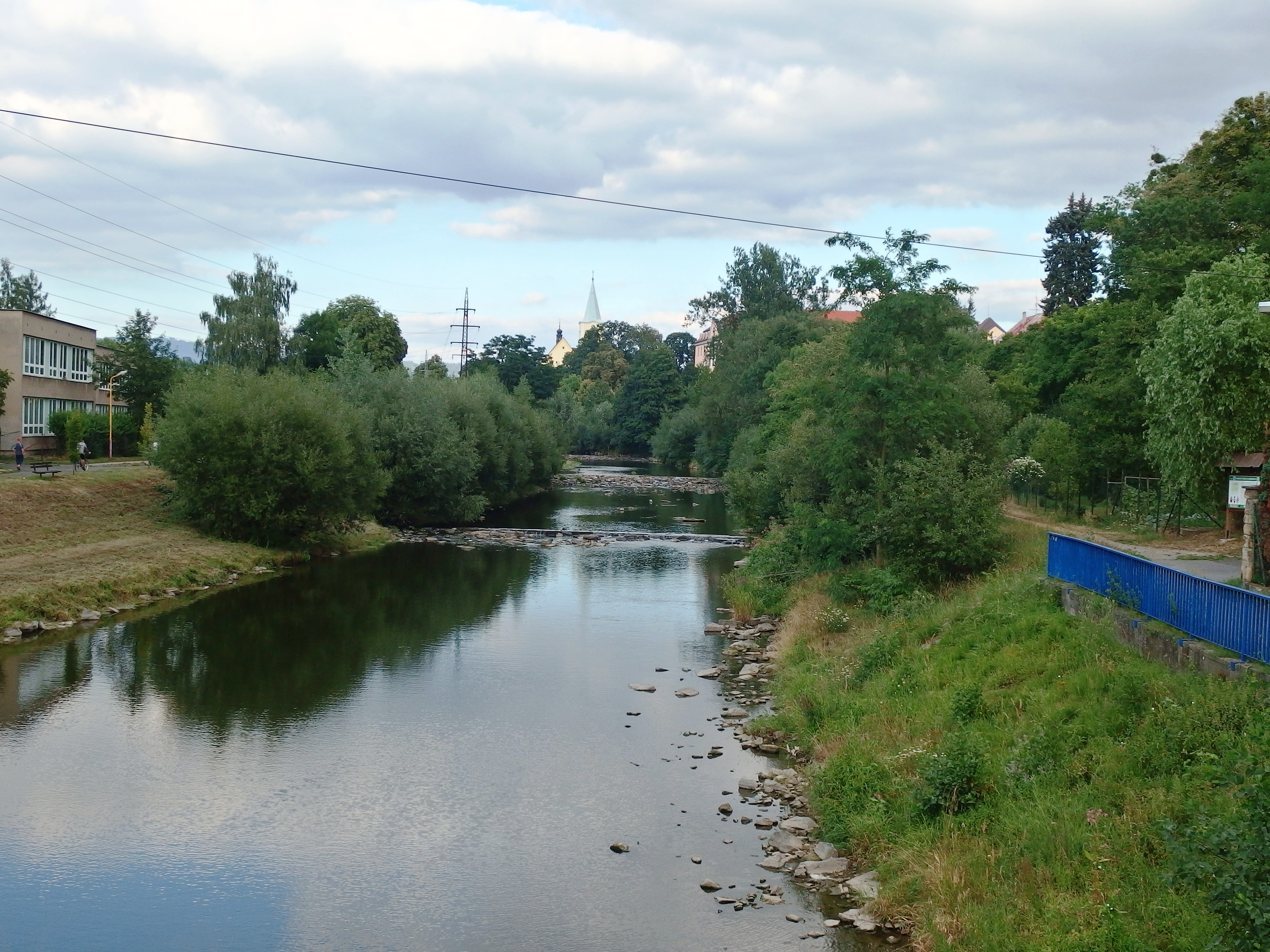
- The Rožnovská Bečva in Valašské Meziříčí

Location
- Country: Czech Republic
- Region: Zlín

Physical characteristics
- Source
  - location: Horní Bečva, Hostýn-Vsetín Mountains
  - coordinates: 49°24′19″N 18°21′47″E
  - elevation: 945 m (3,100 ft)
- Mouth
  - location: Bečva
  - coordinates: 49°28′11″N 17°57′16″E
  - elevation: 285 m (935 ft)
- Length: 38.0 km (23.6 mi)
- Basin size: 254.4 km^{2} (98.2 sq mi)
- Discharge
  - average: 3.76 m^{3}/s (133 cu ft/s) near estuary

Basin features
- Progression: Bečva→ Morava→ Danube→ Black Sea

The Rožnovská Bečva is a river in the Czech Republic, the secondary source river of the Bečva River. It flows through the Zlín Region. It is 38.0 km (23.6 mi) long.

== Etymology ==
The name Bečva is derived from the old Czech words bek, beč (i.e. 'cry'), meaning 'loud river'. The attribute Rožnovská is derived from the town of Rožnov pod Radhoštěm.

== Characteristic ==
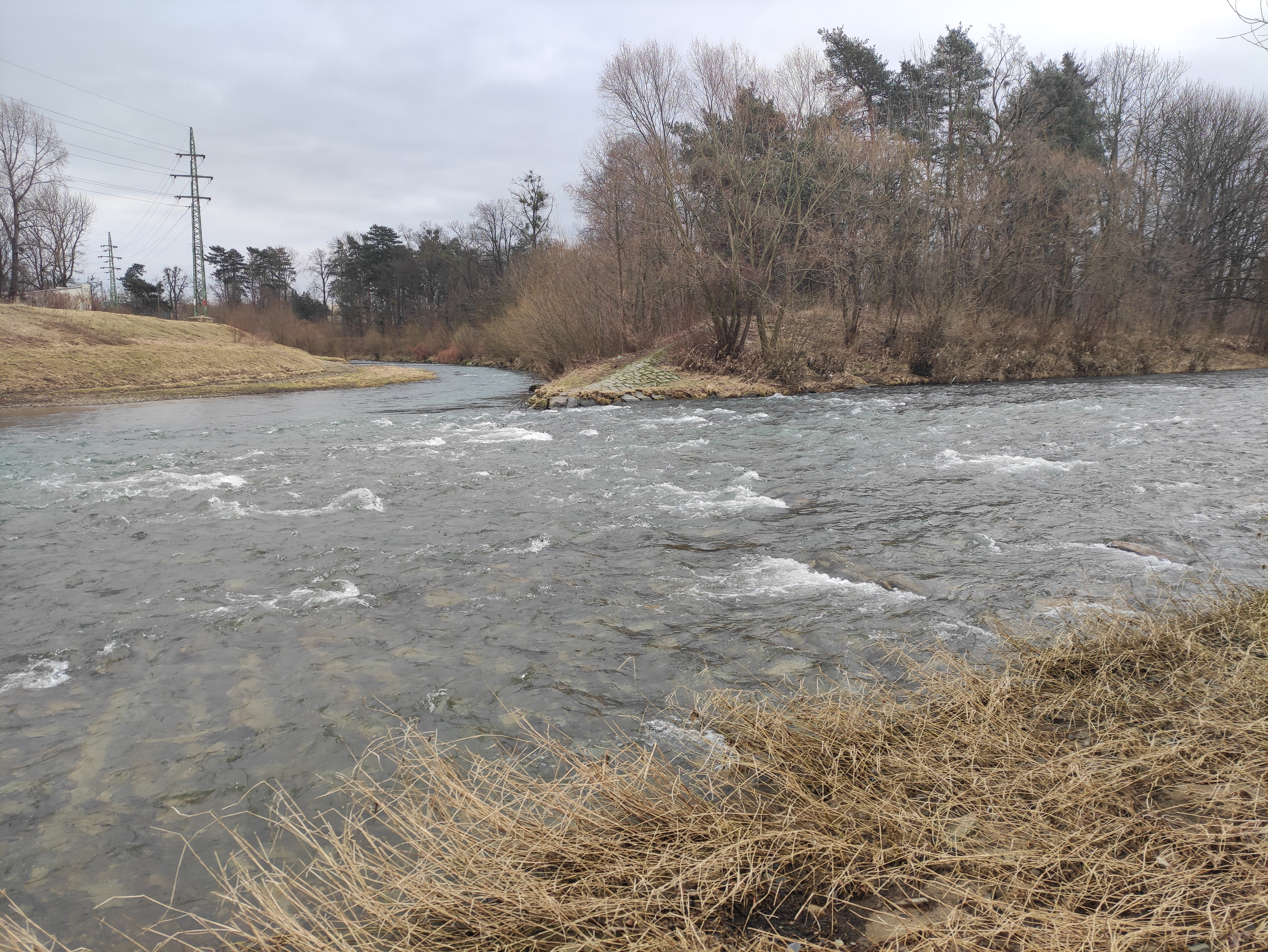
Confluence of the Rožnovská Bečva (left) and Vsetínská Bečva

The Rožnovská Bečva originates in the territory of Horní Bečva in the Hostýn-Vsetín Mountains at an elevation of 945 m (3,100 ft) and then flows to Valašské Meziříčí, where it merges with the Vsetínská Bečva River at an elevation of 285 m (935 ft) and together they form the Bečva. It is 38.0 km (23.6 mi) long. Its drainage basin has an area of 254.4 km^{2} (98.2 sq mi). The average discharge at its mouth is 3.76 m^{3}/s (133 cu ft/s).

The longest tributaries of the Rožnovská Bečva are:

Tributary	Length (km)	Side
Hážovický potok	8.0	left
Starozuberský potok	7.9	right
Maretka	7.3	left
Solanecký potok	7.3	left
Hodorfský potok	7.0	right

== Course ==
The river flows through the municipal territories of Horní Bečva, Prostřední Bečva, Dolní Bečva, Vigantice, Rožnov pod Radhoštěm, Vidče, Zubří, Střítež nad Bečvou, Zašová and Valašské Meziříčí.

== Bodies of water ==
The Horní Bečva Reservoir is built on the upper course of the Rožnovská Bečva. It was built in 1933–1947 and has an area of 10 ha (25 acres). The main purpose of the reservoir is flood protection, but it also serves to maintain a minimum flow under the reservoir and for recreational purposes.
