= Zubří =

- Town
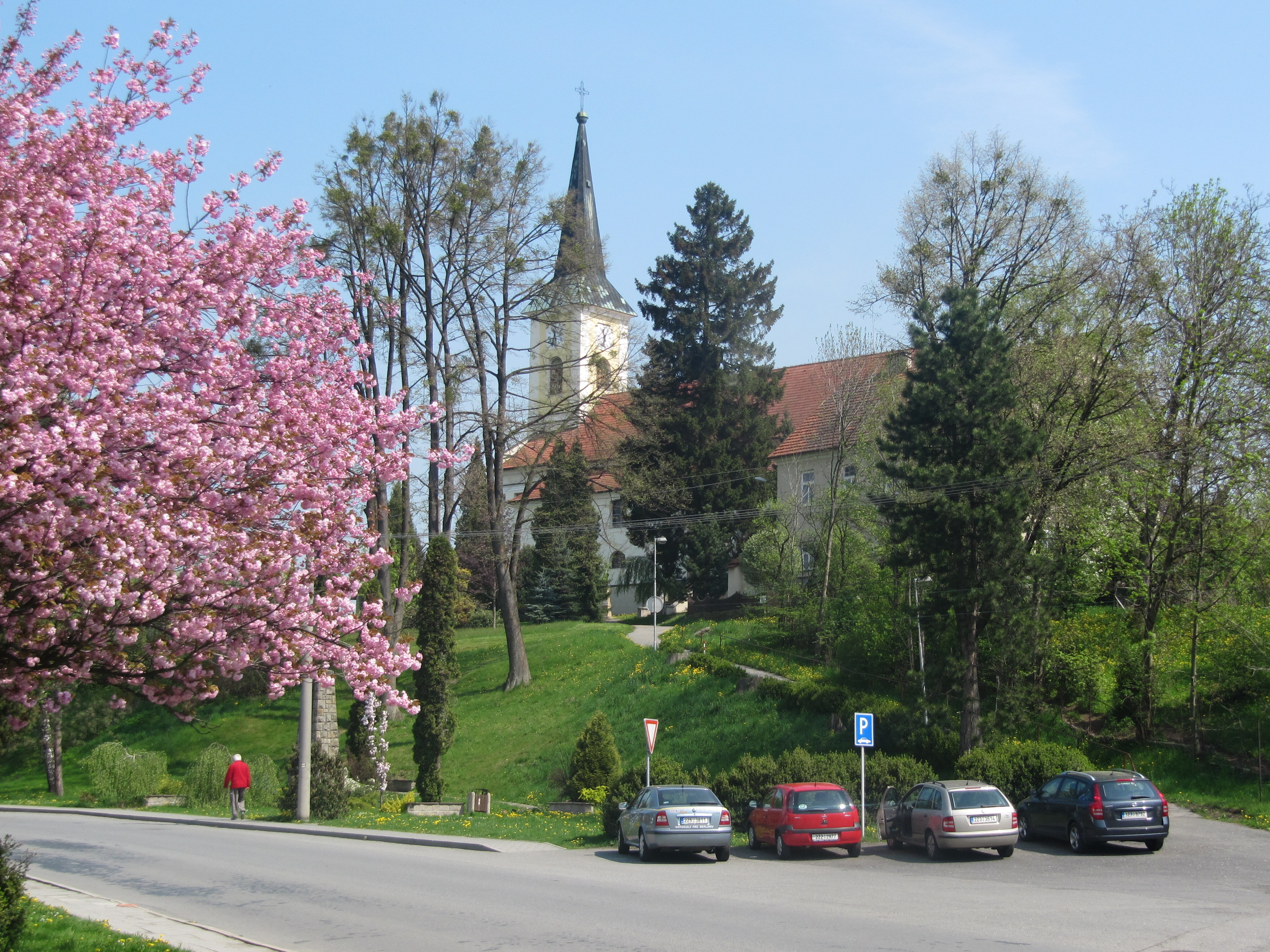
- Church of Saint Catherine

- Flag Coat of arms

- Location in the Czech Republic
- Coordinates: 49°27′58″N 18°5′33″E
- Country: Czech Republic
- Region: Zlín
- District: Vsetín
- Founded: 1310

Government
  - Mayor: Aleš Měrka

Area
  - Total: 28.39 km^{2} (10.96 sq mi)
- Elevation: 378 m (1,240 ft)

Population (2026-01-01)
  - Total: 5,603
  - Density: 197.4/km^{2} (511.2/sq mi)
- Time zone: UTC+1 (CET)
  - Summer (DST): UTC+2 (CEST)
- Postal code: 756 54
- Website: www.mesto-zubri.cz

Zubří (Czech pronunciation: [ˈzubr̝iː]) is a town in Vsetín District in the Zlín Region of the Czech Republic. It has about 5,600 inhabitants. The town proper is located on the Rožnovská Bečva River in the Rožnov Furrow. It is known for the handball club HC ROBE Zubří.

Zubří was founded in 1310, but it became a town only in 2002. The main landmark of the town is the Church of Saint Catherine.

== Etymology ==
The name is derived from the Czech word zubr, i.e. 'European bison'. They lived here at the time when Zubří was founded.

== Geography ==
Zubří is located about 16 kilometres (10 mi) northeast of Vsetín and 38 km (24 mi) south of Ostrava. It lies in the valley of the Rožnovská Bečva River and its tributary, the stream Hodorfský potok. The northern part of the municipal territory lies in the Moravian-Silesian Beskids mountain range; the southern part with the built-up area lies in the Rožnov Furrow. The northern municipal border runs over the mountain peaks of Kamenárka (862 m (2,828 ft)), Dlouhá (859 m), Krátká (767 m) and Hodorf (766 m).

== History ==
Zubří was founded in 1310 by the Lords of Krásno on the site of a hunters' settlement. It was one of the first and largest villages of the Rožnov estate. Crafts were the livelihood of the inhabitants and the village was famous for the production of besoms and embroidery.

In 2002, Zubří became a town.

== Demographics ==
Historical population

Year	Pop.	±%
1869	2,554	—
1880	2,657	+4.0%
1890	2,636	−0.8%
1900	2,887	+9.5%
1910	3,034	+5.1%

Year	Pop.	±%
1921	2,785	−8.2%
1930	3,115	+11.8%
1950	3,319	+6.5%
1961	4,094	+23.4%
1970	4,512	+10.2%

Year	Pop.	±%
1980	5,378	+19.2%
1991	5,274	−1.9%
2001	5,365	+1.7%
2011	5,422	+1.1%
2021	5,332	−1.7%

Source: Censuses

== Transport ==
The I/35 road (part of the European route E442) from Valašské Meziříčí to the Czech–Slovak border runs through the town.

Zubří is located on the railway line Rožnov pod Radhoštěm–Kojetín.

== Sport ==
Handball club HC ROBE Zubří is based in the town. It was founded in 1926 and is among the oldest and most successful Czech handball clubs.

The town is represented by the football club FC Zubří, founded in 1937 as SK Zubří. It plays in lower amateur tiers.

== Sights ==
The main landmark of Zubří is the Church of Saint Catherine. It was built in 1785–1788.

The Chapel of the Holy Spirit was built in 2000. Minor sights are the sculpture group Wallachian Family by Vladimír Navrátil, monument to President Tomáš Garrigue Masaryk with an equestrian motif by Marius Kotrba, and a memorial of the executed partisans.

Koláček's Yew is a protected yew tree, which is about 360 years old (as of 2020). The circumference of its trunk is 295 cm (116 in).

== Notable people ==
- Jiří Svoboda (born 1941), volleyball player
- Zdeněk Pavlíček (born 1952), biathlete
- Tomáš Číp (born 1989), handball player
- Jakub Hrstka (born 1990), handball player

== Twin towns – sister cities ==
Zubří is twinned with:

- Furth an der Triesting, Austria
- Palárikovo, Slovakia
- Považská Bystrica, Slovakia
- Rosdorf, Germany
