= Horní Bečva =

- Municipality
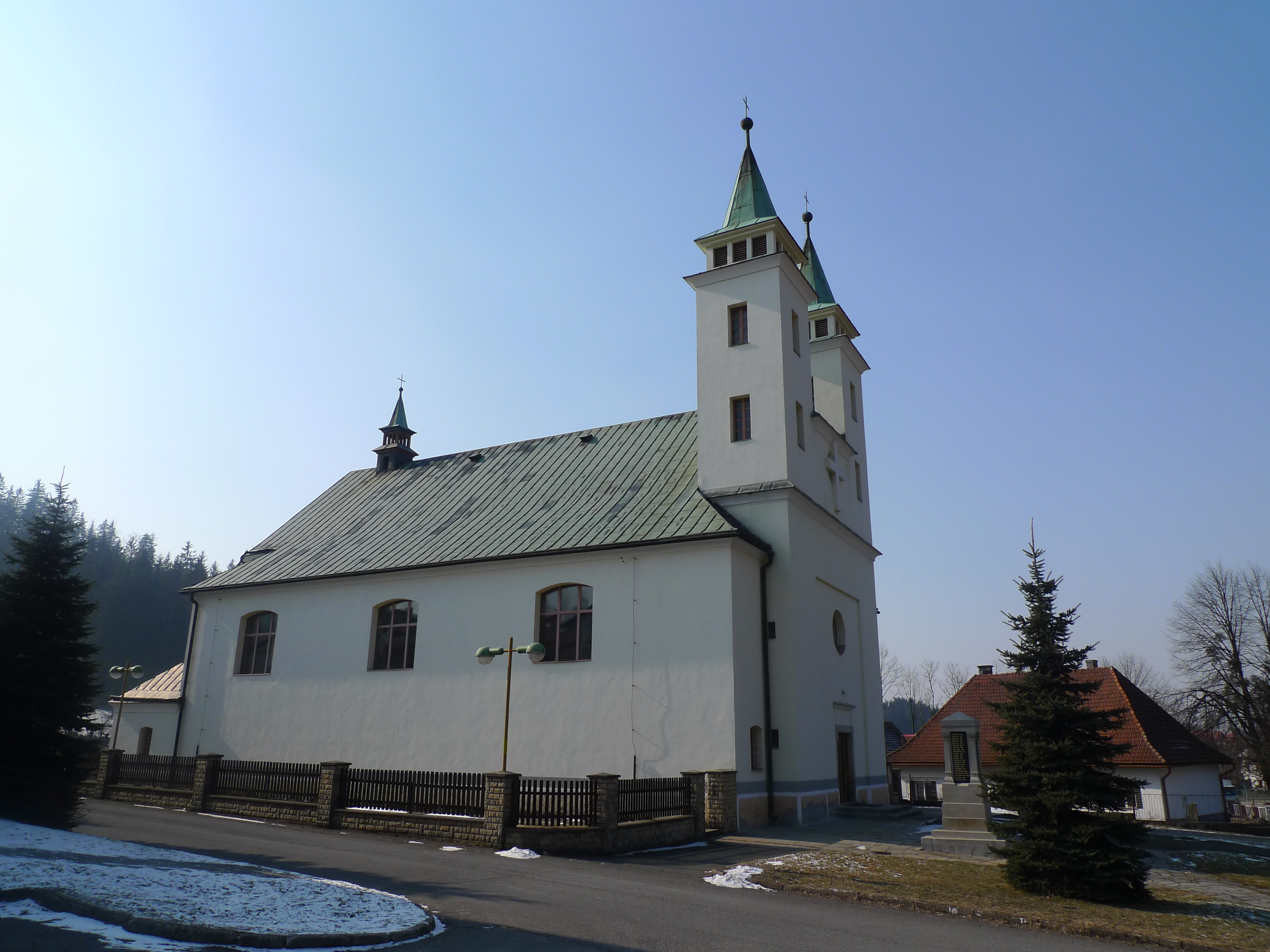
- Church of Saints John and Paul

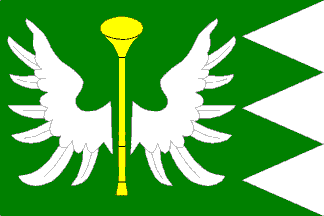
- Flag Coat of arms

- Location in the Czech Republic
- Coordinates: 49°25′56″N 18°17′19″E
- Country: Czech Republic
- Region: Zlín
- District: Vsetín
- First mentioned: 1659

Area
  - Total: 42.41 km^{2} (16.37 sq mi)
- Elevation: 505 m (1,657 ft)

Population (2026-01-01)
  - Total: 2,435
  - Density: 57.42/km^{2} (148.7/sq mi)
- Time zone: UTC+1 (CET)
  - Summer (DST): UTC+2 (CEST)
- Postal code: 756 57
- Website: www.hornibecva.cz

Horní Bečva is a municipality and village in Vsetín District in the Zlín Region of the Czech Republic. It has about 2,400 inhabitants.

== Geography ==
Horní Bečva is located about 19 kilometres (12 mi) northeast of Vsetín and 38 km (24 mi) south of Ostrava. The central part of the municipal territory with the village proper lies in the Rožnov Furrow valley. The northern part lies in the Moravian-Silesian Beskids mountain range and the southern part lies in the Hostýn-Vsetín Mountains. The highest point is the Vysoká mountain at 1,024 m (3,360 ft) above sea level, whose peak lies on the southern municipal border. It is the highest mountain of the Hostýn-Vsetín Mountains.

The Rožnovská Bečva River originates in the territory of Horní Bečva and then flows through the village proper. The Horní Bečva Reservoir, built on the river, is located in the centre of the municipality. It was built in 1933–1947 and has an area of 10 ha (25 acres). The main purpose of the reservoir is flood protection, but it also serves to maintain a minimum flow under the reservoir and for recreational purposes.

== History ==
The first written mention of Horní Bečva is from 1659.

== Demographics ==
Historical population

Year	Pop.	±%
1869	2,697	—
1880	3,079	+14.2%
1890	2,773	−9.9%
1900	2,941	+6.1%
1910	3,139	+6.7%

Year	Pop.	±%
1921	3,002	−4.4%
1930	3,259	+8.6%
1950	2,718	−16.6%
1961	3,256	+19.8%
1970	2,994	−8.0%

Year	Pop.	±%
1980	2,729	−8.9%
1991	2,457	−10.0%
2001	2,419	−1.5%
2011	2,414	−0.2%
2021	2,379	−1.4%

Source: Censuses

== Transport ==
The I/35 road (part of the European route E442) from Valašské Meziříčí to the Czech–Slovak border runs through the municipality.

== Sport ==
There are several ski areas in the municipal territory, with a total of 11 ski lifts.

== Sights ==
The only protected cultural monument in the municipality is a rural homestead from the beginning of the 19th century. The main landmark of Horní Bečva is the Church of Saints John and Paul. It was built in 1792.
