= Vidče =

- Municipality
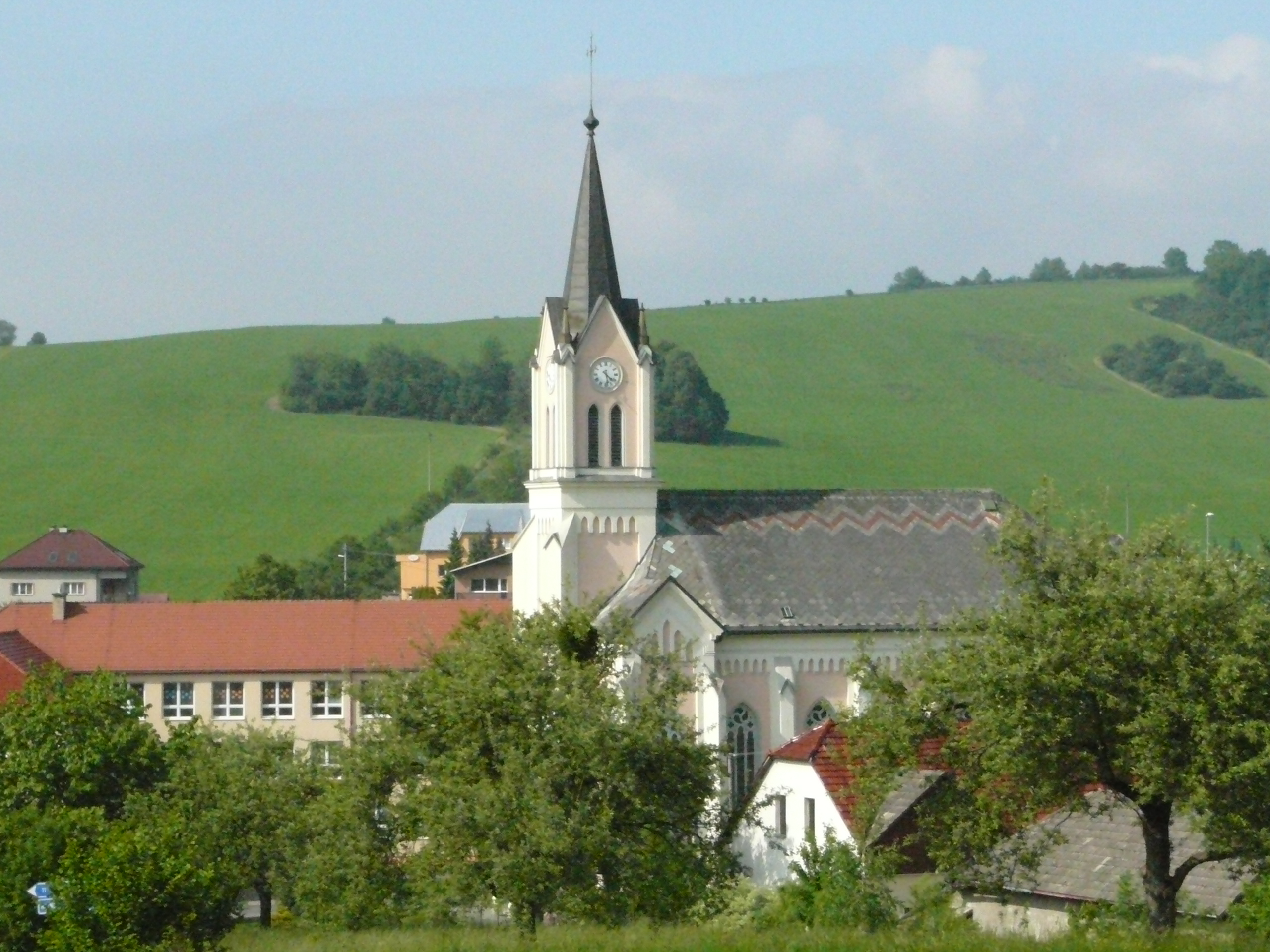
- Church of Saints Cyril and Methodius

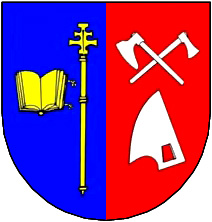
- Flag Coat of arms

- Location in the Czech Republic
- Coordinates: 49°26′29″N 18°5′41″E
- Country: Czech Republic
- Region: Zlín
- District: Vsetín
- First mentioned: 1310

Area
  - Total: 11.77 km^{2} (4.54 sq mi)
- Elevation: 378 m (1,240 ft)

Population (2026-01-01)
  - Total: 1,754
  - Density: 149.0/km^{2} (386.0/sq mi)
- Time zone: UTC+1 (CET)
  - Summer (DST): UTC+2 (CEST)
- Postal code: 756 53
- Website: www.vidce.cz

Vidče is a municipality and village in Vsetín District in the Zlín Region of the Czech Republic. It has about 1,800 inhabitants.

== Geography ==
Vidče is located about 13 kilometres (8 mi) northeast of Vsetín and 41 km (25 mi) south of Ostrava. It lies on the border between the Rožnov Furrow valley and the Hostýn-Vsetín Mountains. The highest point is the hill Dálnice at 599 m (1,965 ft) above sea level. The Maretka Stream flows through the municipality. The Rožnovská Bečva River flows along the northern municipal border. Most of the municipal territory lies within the Beskydy Protected Landscape Area.

== History ==
The first written mention of Vidče is from 1310.

== Demographics ==
Historical population

Year	Pop.	±%
1869	1,437	—
1880	1,504	+4.7%
1890	1,459	−3.0%
1900	1,633	+11.9%
1910	1,749	+7.1%

Year	Pop.	±%
1921	1,462	−16.4%
1930	1,686	+15.3%
1950	1,563	−7.3%
1961	1,606	+2.8%
1970	1,597	−0.6%

Year	Pop.	±%
1980	1,490	−6.7%
1991	1,424	−4.4%
2001	1,600	+12.4%
2011	1,647	+2.9%
2021	1,673	+1.6%

Source: Censuses

== Transport ==
There are no railways or major roads passing through the municipality.

== Sights ==
The main landmark of Vidče is the Church of Saints Cyril and Methodius. It was built in the neo-Gothic style in 1908–1914 and was consecrated in 1920. The second cultural monument is a small wooden belfry. It dates from the 18th century and is equipped with a bell from 1775.
