= Moravská gobelínová manufaktura =

Tapestry manufactory in Valašské Meziríčí, Czech Republic

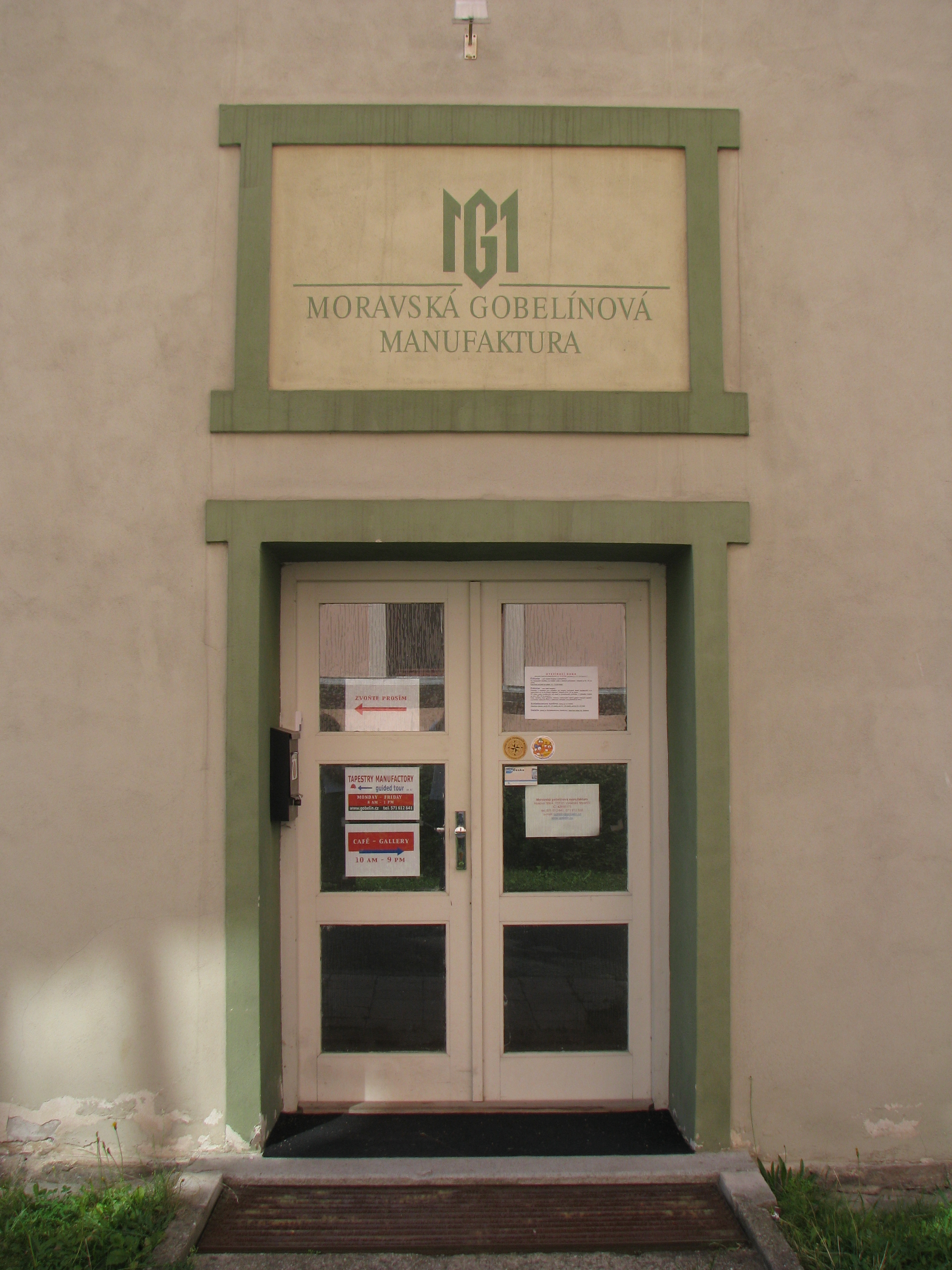
- The entrance door to the Manufactory
- Established: 1898
- Location: Valašské Meziříčí, Czech Republic
- Coordinates: 49°28′12.7″N 17°58′5.8″E
- Type: Tapestry
- Director: Jan T. Sryček
- Website: www.gobelin.cz

The Moravská gobelínová manufaktura (MGM), is a tapestry manufactory in Valašské Meziříčí in the Zlín Region of the Czech Republic. The manufactory has been involved in the area of handmade classical and artistic tapestries, restoring and also creating new pieces with modern themes for more than fifty years. It is considered the first tapestry manufactory in Czechoslovakia, and the only workshop of this kind in Moravia and Czech Silesia.

The workshop, textile manufactory and museum, is also well known for its collaborative works with Czech artists and architects. Its main focus is deeply rooted in preserving the principal technical methods of fine manual work. The manufactory and school of Gobelin tapestry idealized by painter and tapestry designer Rudolf Schlattauer, has now been in activity for more than one hundred years.

== History ==
The first stage in the history of the Moravská gobelínová manufaktura in Valašské Meziříčí dates back to the 19th century, when the author Rudolf Schlattauer materialized his idea of opening a tapestry-weaving workshop. After training as painter at the Academy of Fine Arts in Vienna, Schlattauer studied and practiced painting in other European cities, spending a period of time in Scandinavia. There, he became acquainted with the local manufacture of handwoven tapestry. Schlattauer's Scandinavian sojourn is generally considered a turning point in his subsequent professional activities. In 1898, after returning from the Nordic countries, he established a tapestry-weaving practice in the village of Zašová, near the Moravian town of Valašské Meziříčí. The region's traditional textile cottage industry and in turn skilled work force were viewed as assets for the tapestry workshop's most successful operation.

=== Collaboration ===
During its initial years, the plant had difficulties, particularly economic ones. Problems with sales led to a request for official funding support, which resulted in the manufactory's takeover by the Moravian Regional Committee, followed by its transformation into the Jubilee Regional Tapestry and Carpet School, in Valašské Meziříčí.

Artistically, the school's initial period is associated with textile designs created by its director Rudolf Schlattauer: his tapestries, screens and furniture upholstery feature Art Nouveau motifs, shapes and ornamentation. Of equal importance was the Valašské Meziříčí manufactory's collaboration with Czech painter Hanuš Schwaiger, Schlattauer's fellow student from the Vienna Academy. The factory produced tapestries based on Schwaiger's decorative patterns, and their variations were more in demand in later years. The woven wall tapestry as well as the manufactory's second main article, the hand-knotted carpet, were seen as potential style-forming components in the decoration of interior spaces and as such inspired the manufactory to turn to working with architects. These included Dušan Jurkovič, Jan Kotěra and a large number of their students and followers, many of whom were engaged at the School for Fine Woodworking in Valašské Meziříčí after their Prague studies. The fabrics produced under the directorship of Schlattauer's successor Jaro Kučera are characterized, in terms of style, by a decorativism Art Deco idiom and, thematically, by use of figural subjects related to the newly-established Czechoslovakia.

=== In the 20th century and early 21th centrury ===
The creative partnership between the tapestry establishment and visual artists, through which paintings were translated into textile form, continued to flourish; tapestries were woven from designs by artists Václav Špála, František Süser, and many others. The ensuing 1930s were marked by a minimalist artistic expression, distinctive of functionalist-style carpet designs. During World War I, the manufactory's art production stagnated due to the lack of fine-quality material for tapestry weaving. In 1946, a new management was appointed to the plant and its specialization was expanded to include the restoration of historical tapestries and production of handwoven carpets. The following year saw the establishment of cooperation with foreign companies, among them the French traditional tapestry workshop in Aubusson. In the 1950s, a tapestry was made for the Triennale in Milan from a design by Pravoslak Kotík and another piece was produced from a pattern by Ludmila Kybalová for the World's Fair Expo '58 in Brussels. In the 1960s, the manufactory collaborated with the textile designer Antonín Kybal and a sizable group of his students. Jan Timotej Strýček, the director of the Moravská Gobelínová Manufaktura, was also enrolled in Kybal's studio at the Academy of Arts, Architecture and Design in Prague. Strýček has been representing the manufactory's modern history from the early 1990s until his death in 2023. Apart from textile design work, Strýček also initiated the Actual Textile Art project. The purpose of this initiative has been to resurrect the manufactory's time-tested collaboration with contemporary artists. Over the years, a host of prominent artists embodying many different styles and distinctive aesthetic approaches have been invited to express themselves through the medium of wool. The manufactory is developing these traditions under its current director, Simona Strýčková.

== See also ==
- Gobelins Manufactory
- Textile arts
- Morris & Co.
