= Jakub Hrstka =

Czech handball player

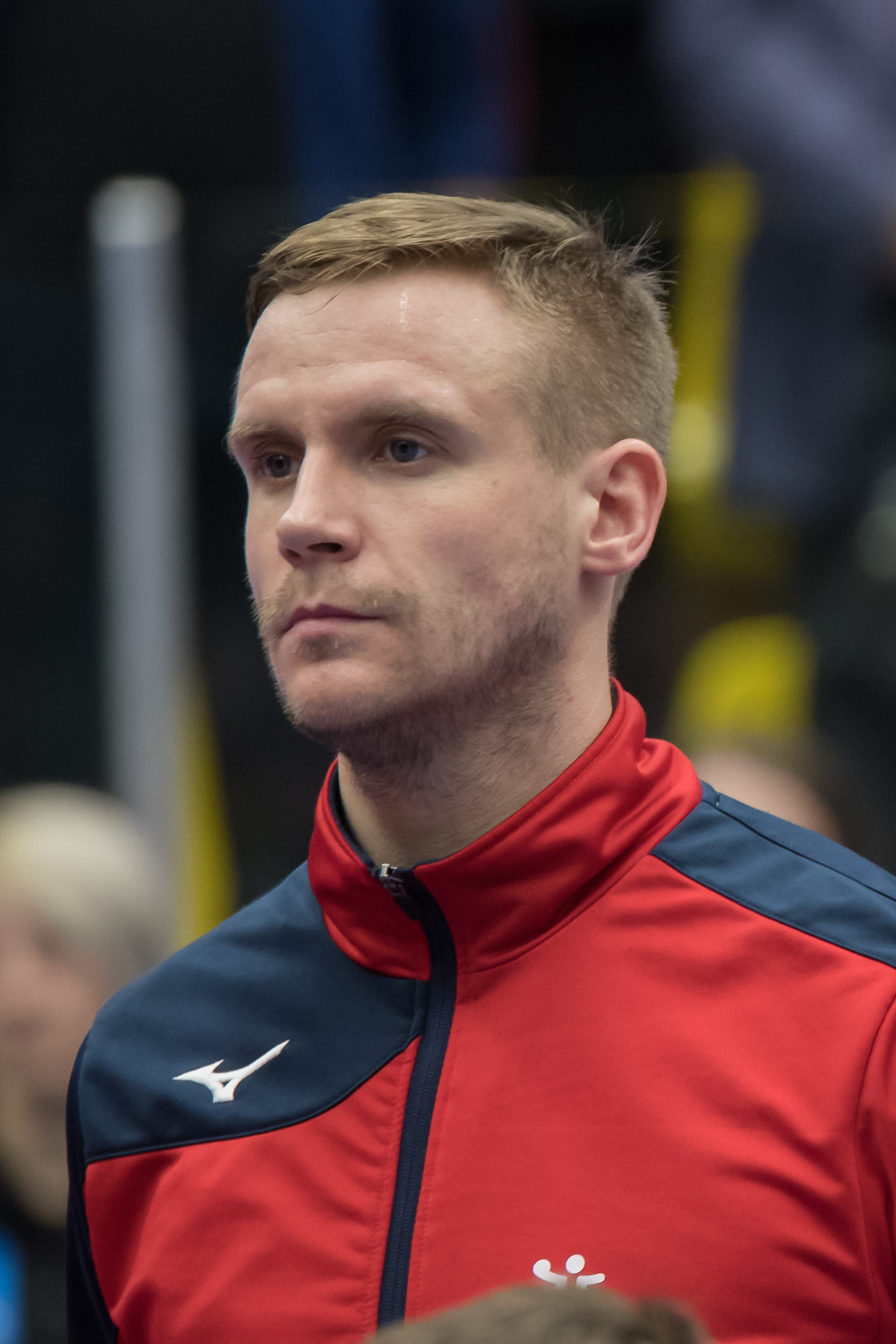

Personal information
- Nationality: Czech
- Born: 17 March 1990 (age 36) Zubří, Czechoslovakia
- Height: 1.86 m (6 ft 1 in)

Sport
- Sport: Handball
- Position: Left wing
- Current club: Dessau-Roßlauer HV
- Number: 6

Senior clubs
- Years: Team
- –2011: HC Zubří
- 2011-2019: HT Tatran Prešov
- 2019–: Dessau-Roßlauer HV
National team
Years	Team	Apps	(Gls)
2007-	Czech Republic	131	(445)
- Updated on 8 February 2024

Jakub Hrstka (born 17 March 1990) is a Czech handball player for German club Dessau-Roßlauer HV and the Czech national team.
