= Helena Zeťová =

Czech singer (1980–2024)

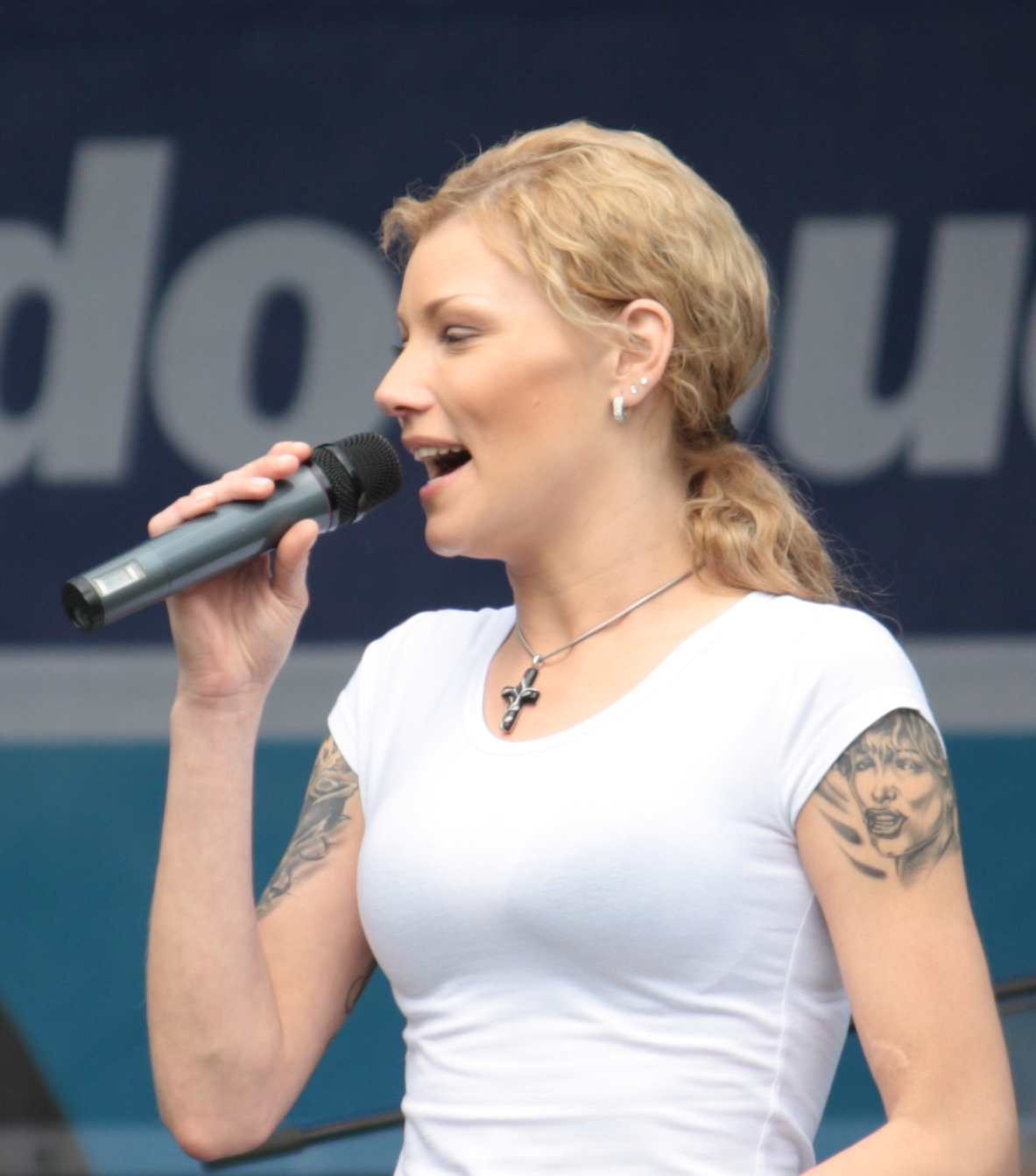
- Zeťová in 2010

Background information
- Born: 7 November 1980; Valašské Meziříčí, Czechoslovakia
- Died: 20 December 2024 (aged 44) Prostřední Bečva, Czech Republic
- Genres: Rock; pop
- Occupation: Singer
- Instrument: Vocals
- Years active: 1996–2024
- Label: Universal Music
- Formerly of: Black Milk
- Website: helenazetova.cz

Helena Zeťová (7 November 1980 – 20 December 2024) was a Czech singer.

== Life and career ==
Zeťová was born on 7 November 1980 in Valašské Meziříčí, Czechoslovakia (now Czech Republic). She started singing at the age of 15, first with a rock band, and later with an American band on the Spanish island of Lanzarote (Canary Islands). Her career started changing after her win at the 2000 Do-Re-Mi amateur singer contest TV show, where she performed "Against All Odds" by Phil Collins. It was her first TV performance. In 2001, she, together with Tereza Kerndlová and Tereza Černochová, established a girl group Black Milk. In 2002 they released their first studio album Modrej dým. The same year they earned the Český slavík prize in the "Discovery of the Year" category.

In 2005, the band dissolved. Half a year later the same year Zeťová released her first solo album, Ready to Roll, and was named "Surprise of the Year" in the Český slavík poll.

In 2019, she moved to Prostřední Bečva and reconstructed a house there. Zeťová died in Prostřední Bečva on 20 December 2024, at the age of 44.

== Discography ==
=== Black Milk ===
==== Studio albums ====
- Modrej dým (2002, platinum album)
- Sedmkrát (2003, gold album)
- Nechci tě trápit (2007, compilation)

==== Singles ====
- Nechci tě trápit (2002)
- Modrej dým (2002)
- Pár nápadů (2002)

=== Solo ===
==== Studio albums ====
- 2005: Ready to Roll (4th in Top 100)
- 2008: Crossing Bridges (5th in Top 100)

==== Singles ====
- 2005 – "Impossible (Unstoppable)" (1st in Top 100)
- 2006 – "Ready to Roll"
- 2006 – "Black Cat"
- 2007 – "Crossing Bridges" (41st in Top 100)
- 2008 – "Love Me Again" (4th in Top 100)
- 2008 – "Don't U Play Games"
