= Rudolf Pernický =

Czech general (1915–2005)

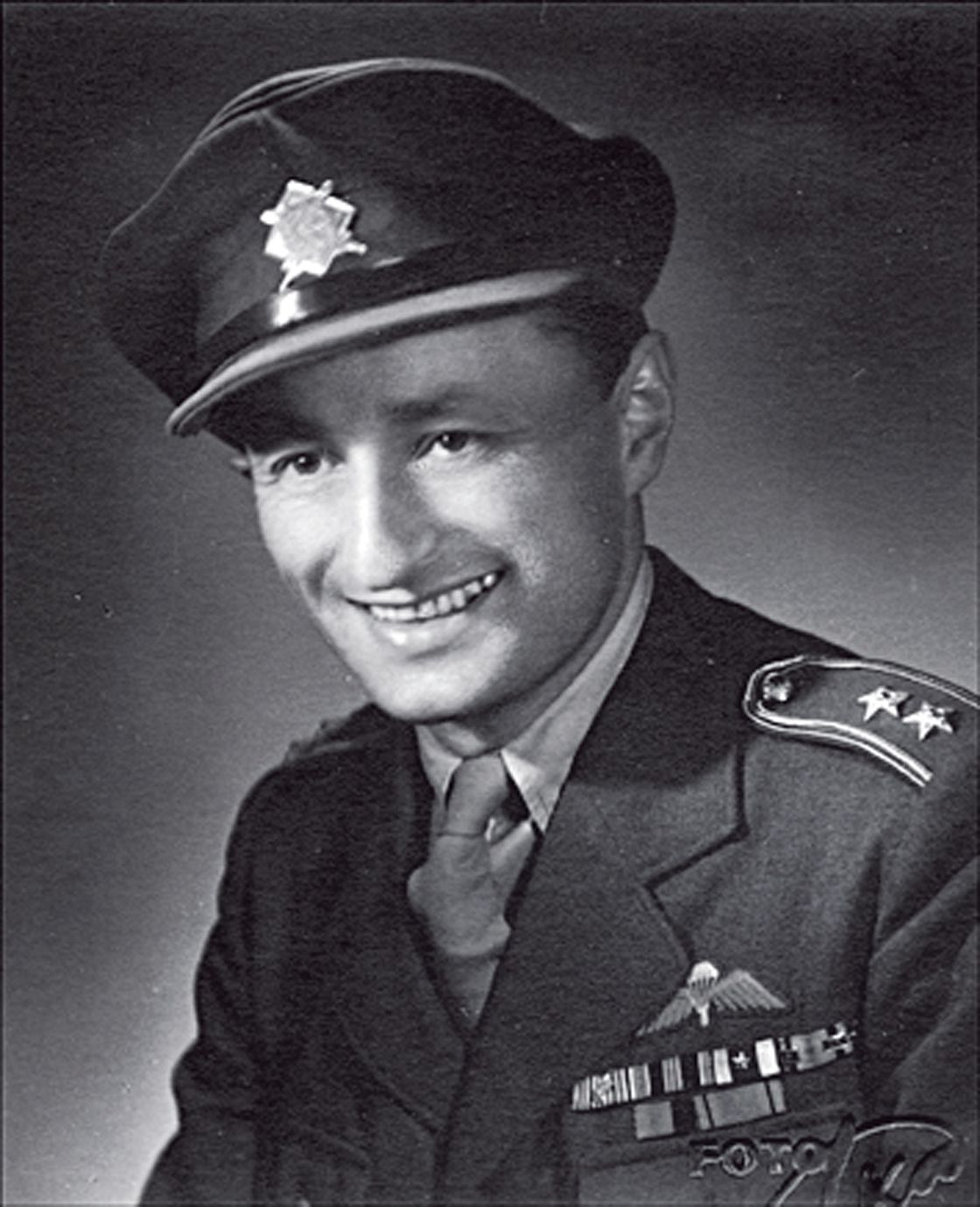
Pernický in 1950

Rudolf Pernický (1 July 1915 – 21 December 2005) was a Czech military leader and paratrooper.

== Life ==
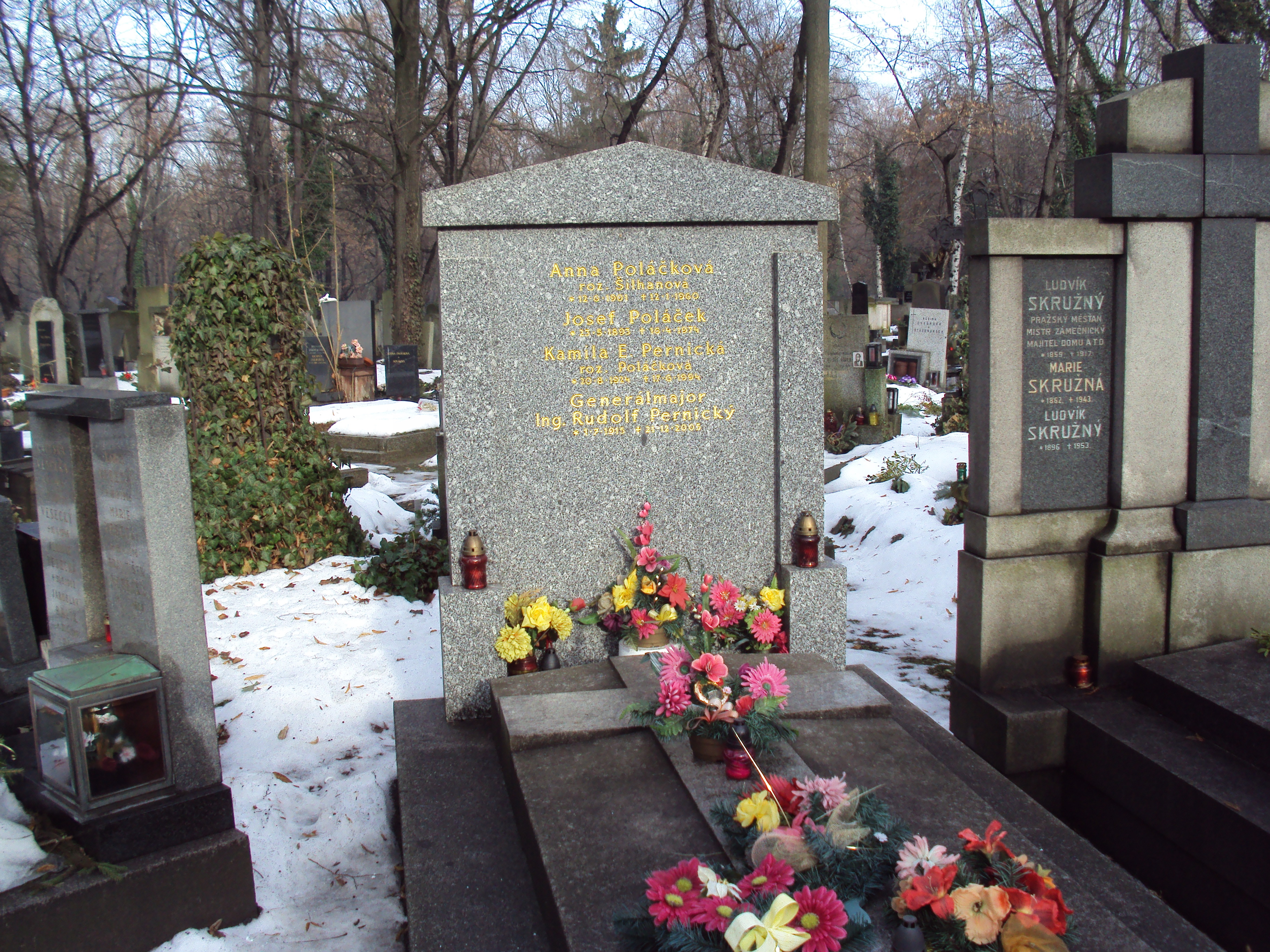
Grave of Pernický at the Olšany Cemetery

Pernický was born on 1 July 1915 in Krhová in Moravia, Austria-Hungary. He fled Czechoslovakia after the 1939 annexation of Sudetenland by Nazi Germany, eventually settling in the United Kingdom. There he worked for the Czechoslovak Government-in-Exile and trained paratroopers being dropped into the Protectorate of Bohemia and Moravia. Later in December 1944 he was parachuted together with rotmistr Leopold Musil into the Protectorate to support the home Czech resistance movement (operation codename Tungsten) – unfortunately 100 km away from their original target. They both survived seven-day march through the snow-covered terrain avoiding any contact (carrying a radio beacon and other illegal material) and before World War II ended they actively organized the resistance movement around Nové Město na Moravě.

After the liberation of Czechoslovakia he joined the Czechoslovak Army at the general staff and graduated from the military academy. But shortly after the communist takeover in 1948 he was arrested and in a political trial sentenced to 20 years in prison. He got to the worst communist forced labour camps (as Příbram, Jáchymov etc.) and was amnestied as late as 1960. However till the end of communist regime he was still persecuted and allowed only for the manual labour employment. After that he was fully rehabilitated, given back all his honours and the rank of army general. He was also elected as the first chairman of Confederation of Political Prisoners and after his term ended he remain an honorary chairman.

On 28 October 2005, he was decorated by the president of the Czech Republic with the highest Czech order – the Order of the White Lion, 1st class. As being seriously ill (he passed already a serious operation only a week before the ceremony), this was his last public appearance. He died in Prague on 21 December 2005, on the 61st anniversary of the air-landing to his country.
