= Tomáš Číp =

Czech handball player

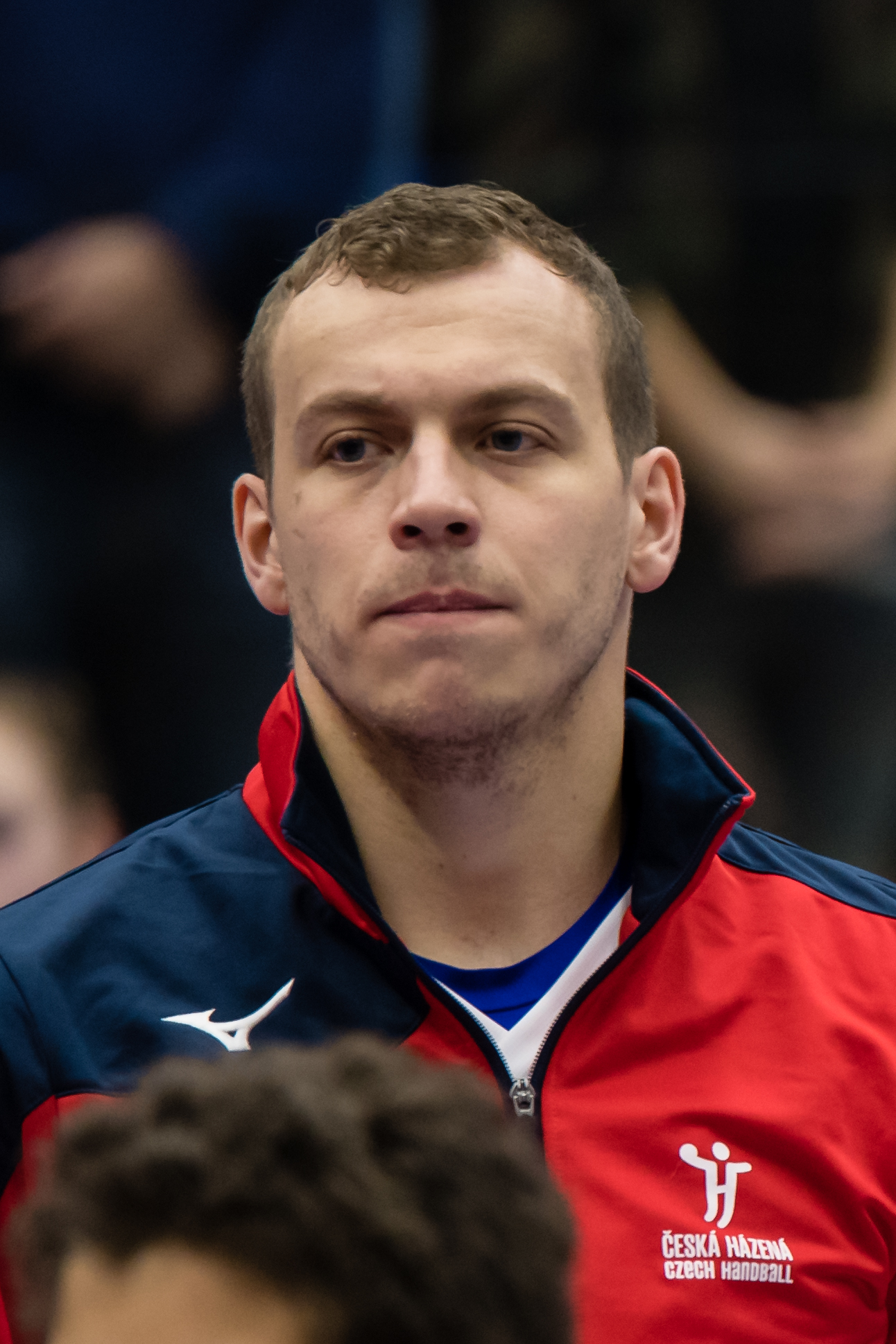

Personal information
- Nationality: Czech
- Born: 5 October 1989 (age 37) Zubří, Czechoslovakia
- Height: 1.87 m (6 ft 2 in)

Sport
- Sport: Handball
- Position: Right wing
- Current club: Minaur Baia Mare
- Number: 21
National team
Years	Team	Apps	(Gls)
–	Czech Republic	94	(215)
- Updated on 25 August 2025

Tomáš Číp (born 5 October 1989) is a Czech handball player for Minaur Baia Mare and the Czech national team.

He participated at the 2018 European Men's Handball Championship.
