= Zubří (Žďár nad Sázavou District) =

- Municipality
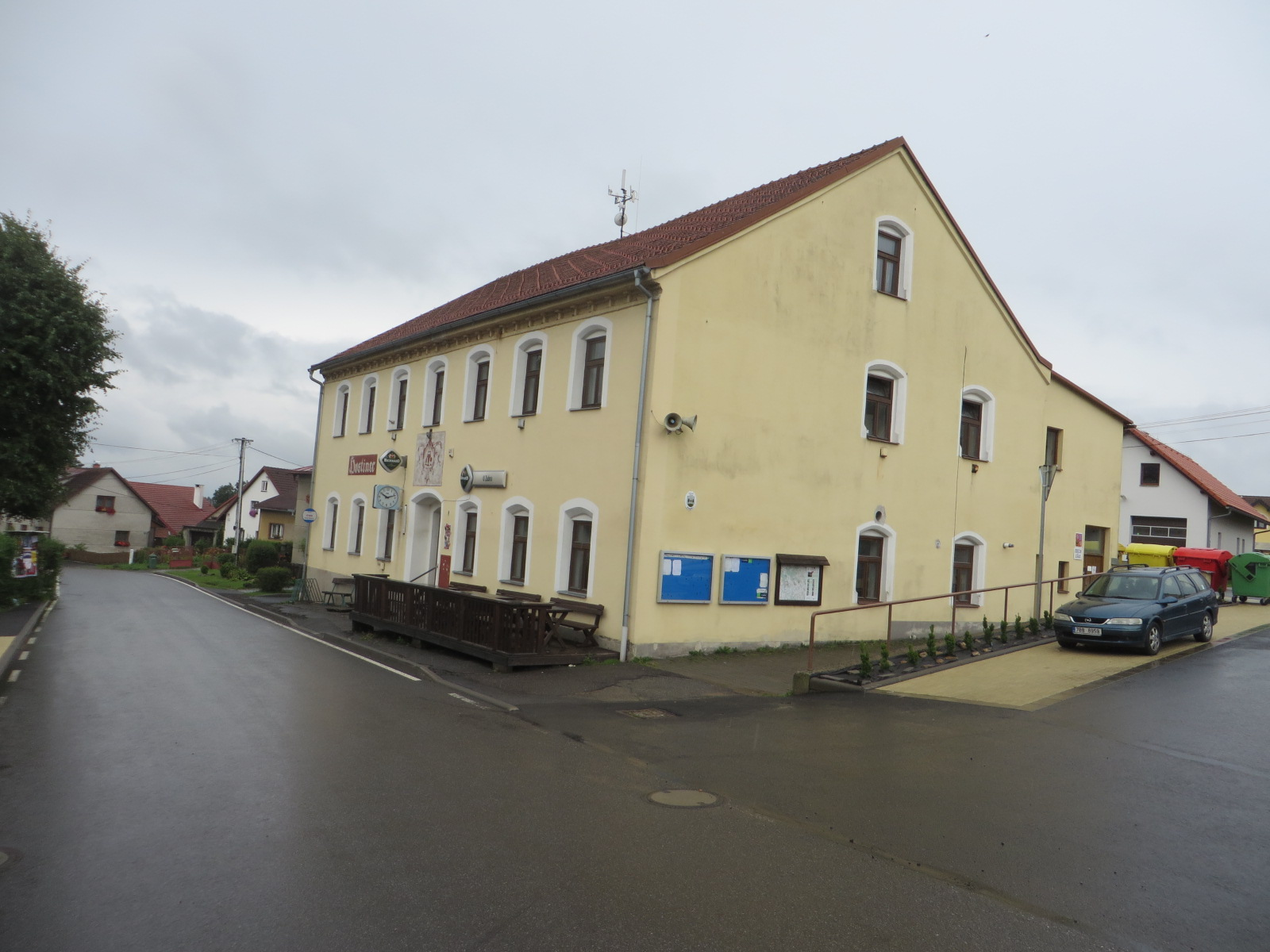
- Municipal office

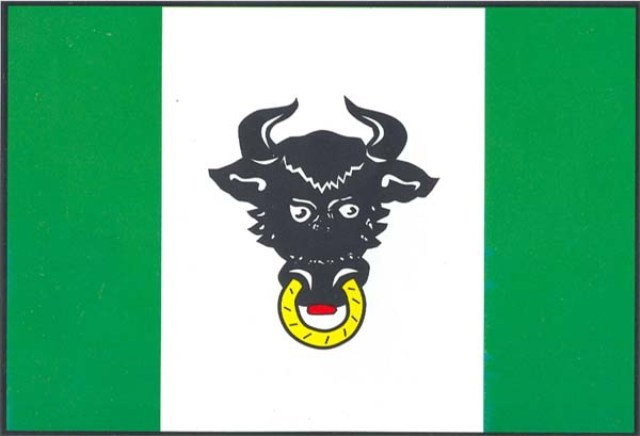
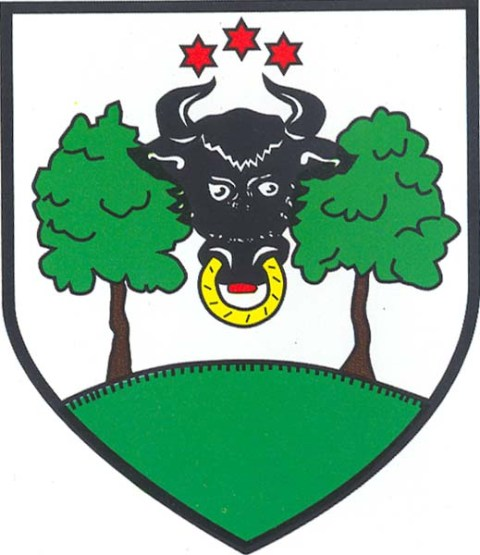
- Flag Coat of arms

- Location in the Czech Republic
- Coordinates: 49°34′16″N 16°7′25″E
- Country: Czech Republic
- Region: Vysočina
- District: Žďár nad Sázavou
- First mentioned: 1348

Area
  - Total: 8.46 km^{2} (3.27 sq mi)
- Elevation: 672 m (2,205 ft)

Population (2026-01-01)
  - Total: 529
  - Density: 62.5/km^{2} (162/sq mi)
- Time zone: UTC+1 (CET)
  - Summer (DST): UTC+2 (CEST)
- Postal code: 592 31
- Website: www.obeczubri.cz

Zubří is a municipality and village in Žďár nad Sázavou District in the Vysočina Region of the Czech Republic. It has about 500 inhabitants.

Zubří lies approximately 14 kilometres (9 mi) east of Žďár nad Sázavou, 44 kilometres (27 mi) north-east of Jihlava, and 135 kilometres (84 mi) south-east of Prague.

== Demographics ==
Historical population
Year	Pop.	±%
1869	485	—
1880	523	+7.8%
1890	498	−4.8%
1900	445	−10.6%
1910	490	+10.1%
1921	471	−3.9%
1930	407	−13.6%
1950	340	−16.5%
1961	371	+9.1%
1970	344	−7.3%
1980	349	+1.5%
1991	350	+0.3%
2001	356	+1.7%
2011	422	+18.5%
2021	509	+20.6%
Source: Censuses
