= Robin Kovář =

Czech ice hockey player

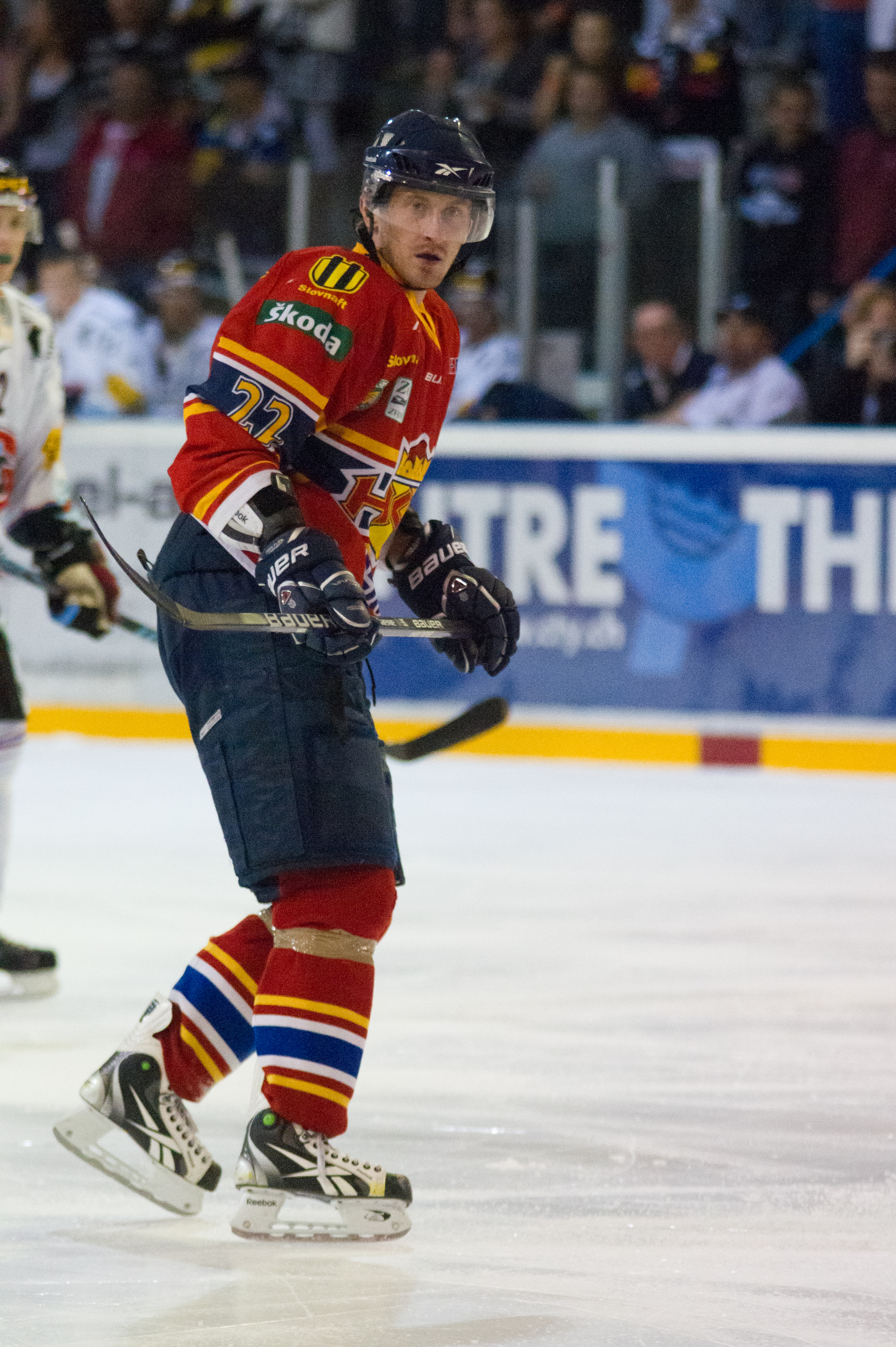
- Born: April 2, 1984 (age 42) Valašské Meziříčí, Czechoslovakia
- Height: 6 ft 1 in (185 cm)
- Weight: 185 lb (84 kg; 13 st 3 lb)
- Position: Forward
- Shot: Right
- NIHL team Former teams: Milton Keynes Lightning; HC Vsetín; HC Zlín; HC Havirov; HC Kometa Brno; HK 32 Liptovsky Mikulas; Eindhoven Kemphanen; HKm Zvolen; Manchester Phoenix; Swindon Wildcats; Yertis Pavlodar; Hokiklub Budapest; Blackburn Hawks
- National team: Czech Republic
- NHL draft: 123rd overall, 2002; Edmonton Oilers
- Playing career: 2001–2020

Robin Kovář (born April 2, 1984) is a former Czech professional ice hockey player who played for the Milton Keynes Lightning in the National Ice Hockey League.

== Career statistics ==
			Regular season					Playoffs
Season	Team	League	GP	G	A	Pts	PIM	GP	G	A	Pts	PIM
1999–2000	HC Slovnaft Vsetín	CZE U18	44	26	30	56	32	2	0	2	2	2
2000–01	HC Slovnaft Vsetín	CZE U18	8	9	7	16	4	—	—	—	—	—
2000–01	HC Slovnaft Vsetín	CZE U20	34	6	11	17	14	9	1	5	6	10
2000–01	HC Slovnaft Vsetín	ELH	1	0	0	0	0	—	—	—	—	—
2001–02	Vancouver Giants	WHL	35	5	10	15	18	—	—	—	—	—
2002–03	Vancouver Giants	WHL	71	13	29	42	73	4	0	1	1	0
2003–04	Vsetínská hokejová	CZE U20	3	3	1	4	0	—	—	—	—	—
2003–04	Vsetínská hokejová	ELH	8	0	0	0	4	—	—	—	—	—
2003–04	Regina Pats	WHL	36	6	12	18	27	4	1	0	1	6
2004–05	Vsetínská hokejová	CZE U20	2	5	1	6	0	—	—	—	—	—
2004–05	Vsetínská hokejová	ELH	37	7	3	10	16	—	—	—	—	—
2004–05	TJ Valašské Meziříčí	CZE.3	1	0	0	0	0	—	—	—	—	—
2005–06	HC Hamé Zlín	ELH	32	1	0	1	45	—	—	—	—	—
2005–06	HC Havířov Panthers	CZE.2	4	1	2	3	2	—	—	—	—	—
2006–07	HC Hamé Zlín	ELH	28	1	3	4	22	5	0	1	1	6
2006–07	SK Horácká Slavia Třebíč	CZE.2	7	1	1	2	6	1	0	0	0	0
2007–08	HC Kometa Brno	CZE.2	7	0	0	0	0	—	—	—	—	—
2007–08	Hokej Šumperk 2003	CZE.2	29	12	8	20	20	—	—	—	—	—
2008–09	MHk 32 Liptovský Mikuláš	SVK	51	15	16	31	79	6	0	0	0	10
2009–10	Eindhoven Kemphanen	NED	29	15	24	39	55	—	—	—	—	—
2009–10	HC Bobři Valašské Meziříčí	CZE.3	15	7	7	14	22	9	7	8	15	6
2010–11	HKm Zvolen	SVK	57	12	22	34	48	4	1	1	2	8
2011–12	HC Slovan Ústečtí Lvi	CZE.2	44	14	16	30	22	5	0	1	1	4
2012–13	HC Slovan Ústečtí Lvi	CZE.2	49	26	17	43	18	8	2	1	3	4
2013–14	Manchester Phoenix	EPIHL	52	36	42	78	30	4	3	3	6	2
2014–15	Manchester Phoenix	EPIHL	48	30	46	76	91	4	4	4	8	4
2015–16	Manchester Phoenix	EPIHL	53	32	58	90	63	2	0	1	1	0
2016–17	Manchester Phoenix	EPIHL	34	18	29	47	39	—	—	—	—	—
2016–17	Swindon Wildcats	EPIHL	15	13	9	22	8	—	—	—	—	—
2017–18	Yertis Pavlodar	KAZ	28	5	8	13	22	—	—	—	—	—
2018–19	KMH Budapest	EL	8	0	5	5	8	—	—	—	—	—
2018–19	Blackburn Hawks	GBR.3	15	12	16	28	10	2	0	2	2	4
2019–20	Bracknell Bees	GBR.2	12	6	5	11	6	—	—	—	—	—
2019–20	Milton Keynes Lightning	GBR.2	18	14	22	36	39	—	—	—	—	—
ELH totals			106	9	6	15	87	5	0	1	1	6
SVK totals			108	27	38	65	127	10	1	1	2	18
EPIHL totals			202	129	184	313	231	15	8	10	18	8
