= Valašské Meziříčí =

- Town
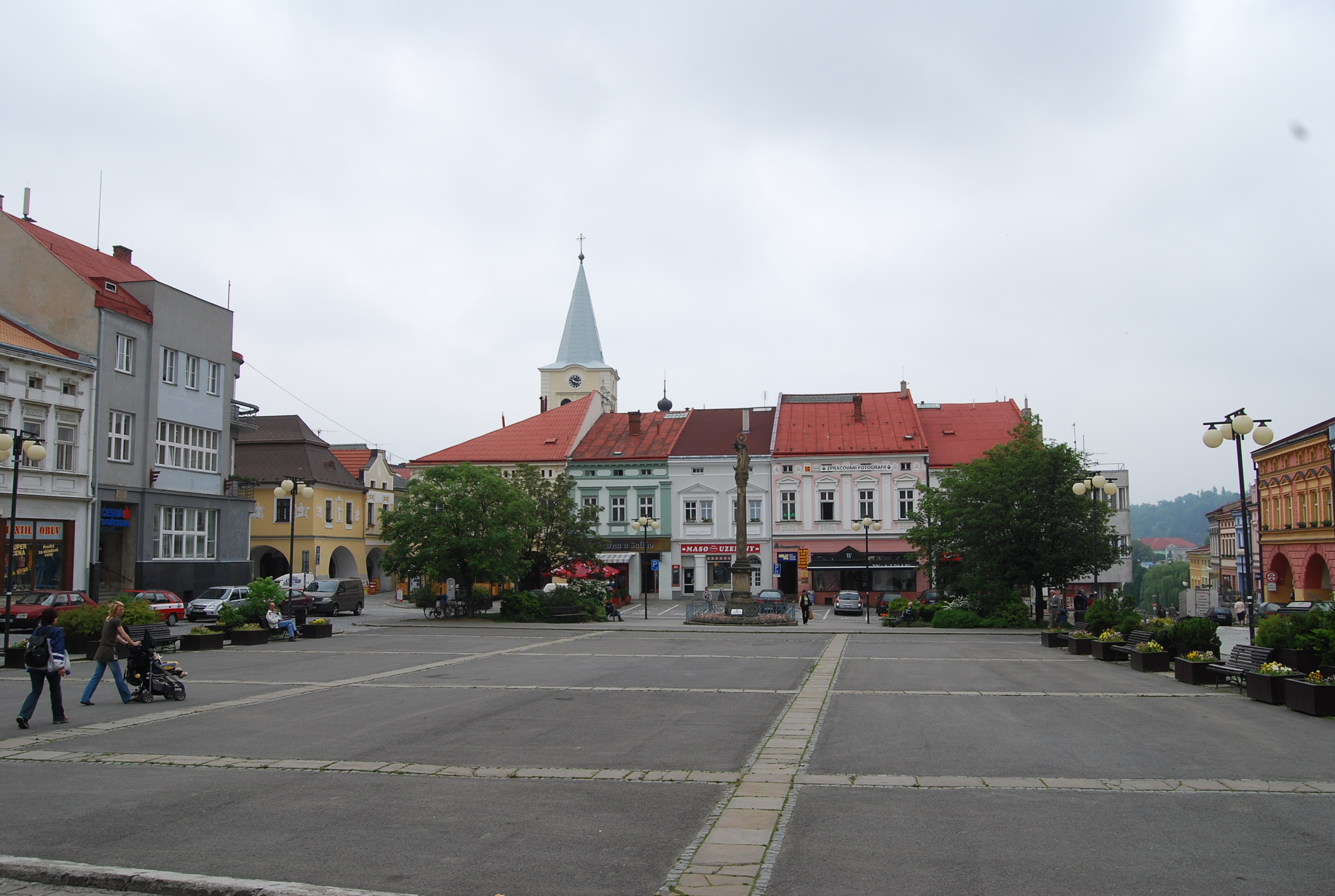
- Town square

- Flag Coat of arms

- Location in the Czech Republic
- Coordinates: 49°28′18″N 17°58′16″E
- Country: Czech Republic
- Region: Zlín
- District: Vsetín
- First mentioned: 1297

Government
  - Mayor: Robert Stržínek (ANO)

Area
  - Total: 35.44 km^{2} (13.68 sq mi)
- Elevation: 294 m (965 ft)

Population (2026-01-01)
  - Total: 22,568
  - Density: 636.8/km^{2} (1,649/sq mi)
- Time zone: UTC+1 (CET)
  - Summer (DST): UTC+2 (CEST)
- Postal code: 757 01
- Website: www.valasskemezirici.cz

Valašské Meziříčí (Czech pronunciation: [ˈvalaʃskɛː ˈmɛzɪr̝iːtʃiː]; German: Wallachisch Meseritsch) is a town in Vsetín District in the Zlín Region of the Czech Republic. It has about 23,000 inhabitants. The town is located at the confluence of the Vsetínská Bečva and Rožnovská Bečva rivers, which form the Bečva River.

Valašské Meziříčí is an industrial town, known especially for the chemical industry. The historic town centre is well preserved and is protected as an urban monument zone. Among the most valuable monuments of Valašské Meziříčí are the Church of the Assumption of the Virgin Mary and the Žerotín Castle.

== Administrative division ==
Valašské Meziříčí consists of seven municipal parts (in brackets population according to the 2021 census):

- Valašské Meziříčí (10,619)
- Bynina (640)
- Hrachovec (964)
- Juřinka (476)
- Krásno nad Bečvou (7,056)
- Lhota (231)
- Podlesí (1,723)

== Etymology ==
The name Meziříčí means 'between the rivers' in Czech and is related to the town's location on the confluence of rivers. The prefix Valašské (i.e. 'Wallachian') refers to its location in the region of Moravian Wallachia.

== Geography ==
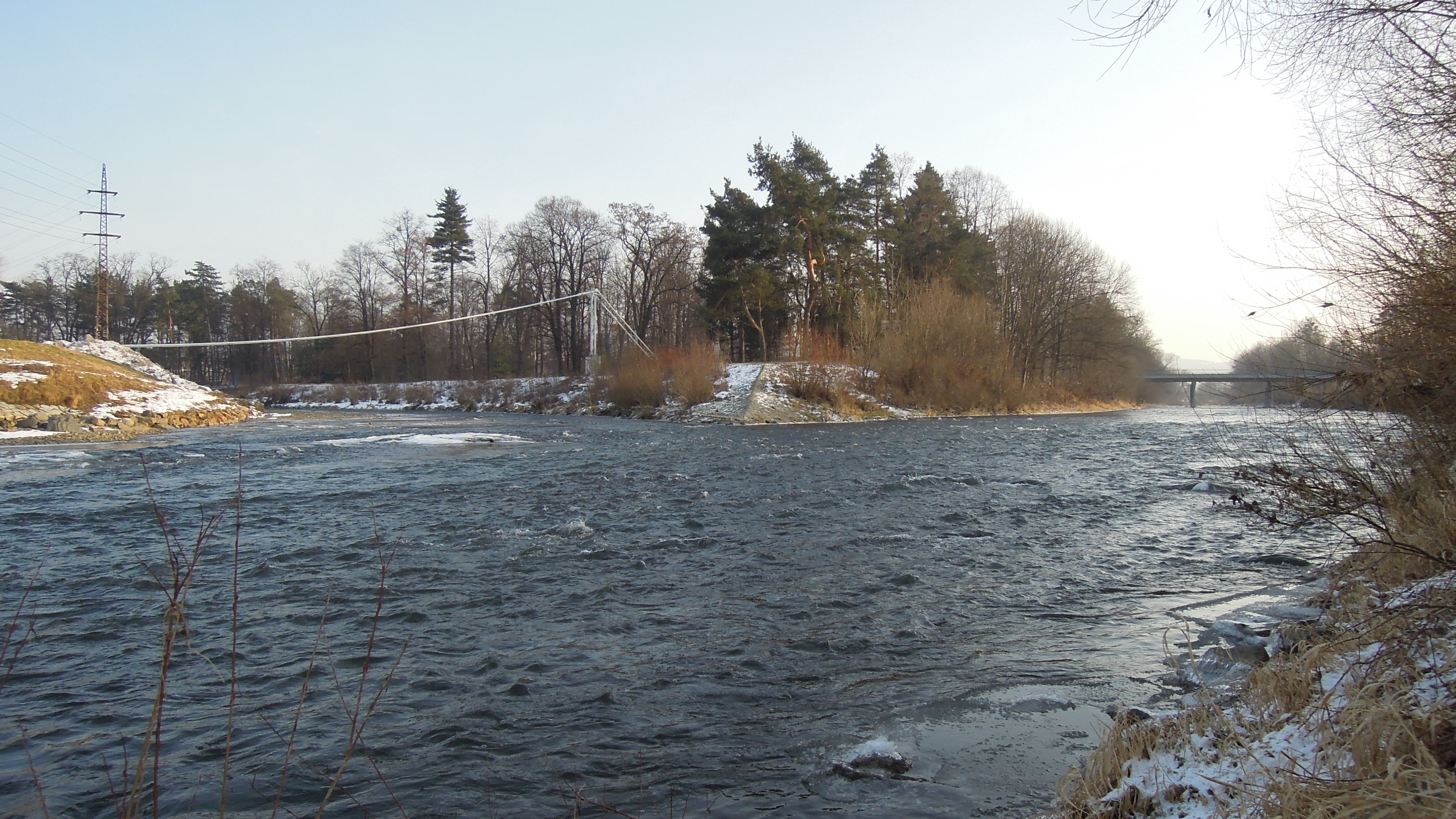
Confluence of the Vsetínská Bečva and Rožnovská Bečva

Valašské Meziříčí is located about 15 kilometres (9 mi) north of Vsetín and 34 km (21 mi) northeast of Zlín. The Vsetínská Bečva and Rožnovská Bečva rivers join in the town to form the Bečva River.

The municipal territory of Valašské Meziříčí lies in three geomorphological regions. The western and northern parts lie in the Moravian-Silesian Foothills, the eastern part lies in the Rožnov Furrow, and the southern part lies in the Hostýn-Vsetín Mountains. The highest point is the hill Brdo at 543 m (1,781 ft) above sea level.

== History ==
The first written mention of Valašské Meziříčí is from 1297. The village on the left bank of the Rožnovská Bečva was first referred to as a town in 1377. Krásno nad Bečvou was founded on the right bank of the Rožnovská Bečva and in 1491 it was promoted to a market town. Krásno nad Bečvou was a separate entity until 1924, when it was merged with Valašské Meziříčí, however, their history is similar and they had common owners.

The most significant owner of the two estates was the Zierotin family, who had built a Renaissance castle here. In the 19th century, Valašské Meziříčí became the centre of education and Krásno nad Bečvou was industrialised.

== Demographics ==
Historical population

Year	Pop.	±%
1869	7,108	—
1880	7,767	+9.3%
1890	8,024	+3.3%
1900	8,245	+2.8%
1910	8,529	+3.4%

Year	Pop.	±%
1921	8,495	−0.4%
1930	11,173	+31.5%
1950	12,413	+11.1%
1961	13,981	+12.6%
1970	19,252	+37.7%

Year	Pop.	±%
1980	23,253	+20.8%
1991	24,864	+6.9%
2001	24,130	−3.0%
2011	22,922	−5.0%
2021	21,709	−5.3%

Source: Censuses

== Economy ==
Valašské Meziříčí has a tradition of chemical, automotive and food industry. The town is known for one of the largest chemical plants in Europe, DEZA a.s., a part of the Agrofert conglomerate. The plant was founded in 1960 and is focused on processing of tar and benzene.

Moravská gobelínová manufaktura is a unique tapestry manufactory established in 1898.

== Transport ==
The town lies at the crossroads of two main roads: the I/35 (the section from Hranice to the Czech–Slovak border in Bílá) and the I/57 (the section from Nový Jičín to the Czech–Slovak border in Brumov-Bylnice).

Valašské Meziříčí is located on the railway lines Vsetín–Hranice and Kroměříž–Rožnov pod Radhoštěm.

== Sights ==
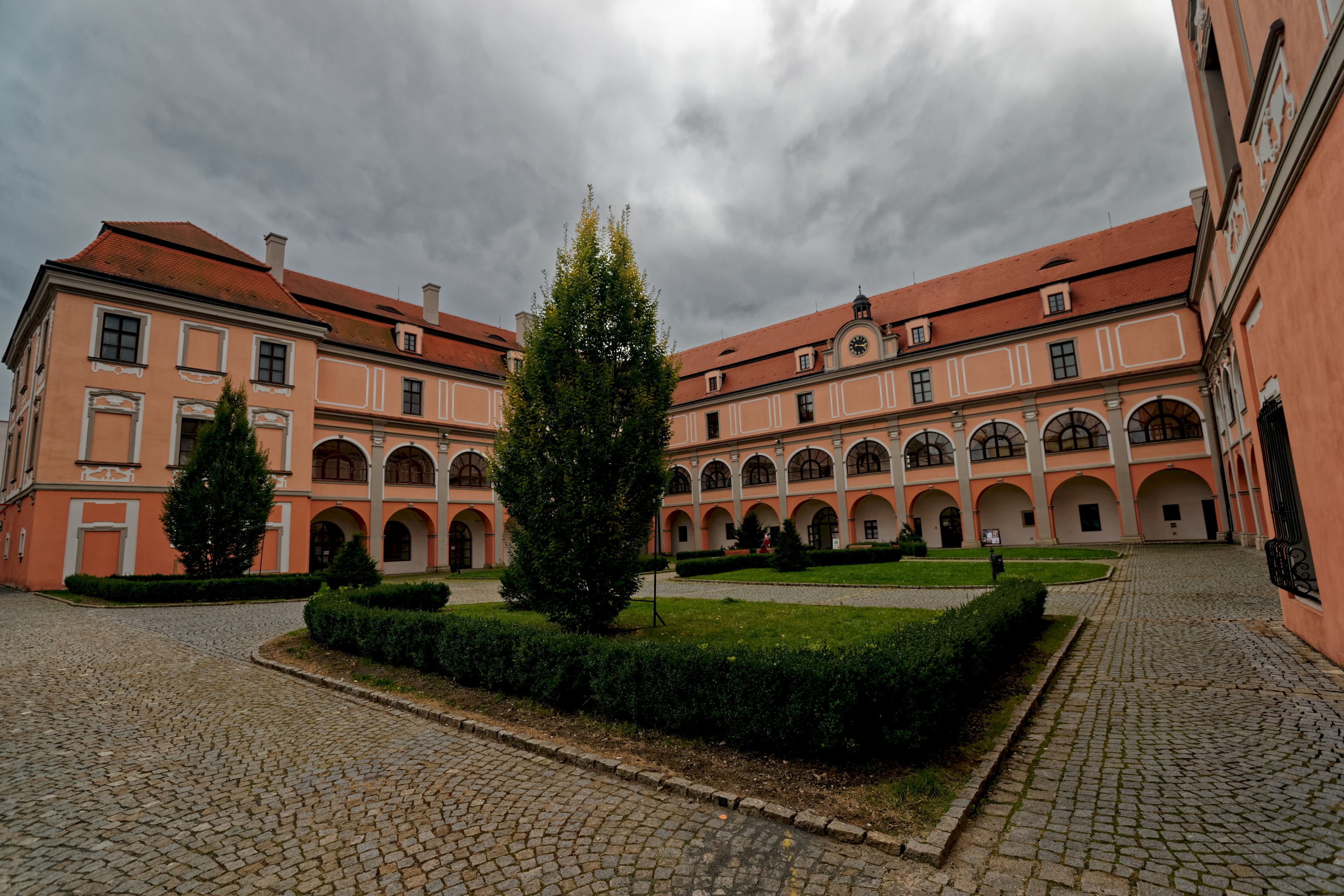
Žerotín Castle

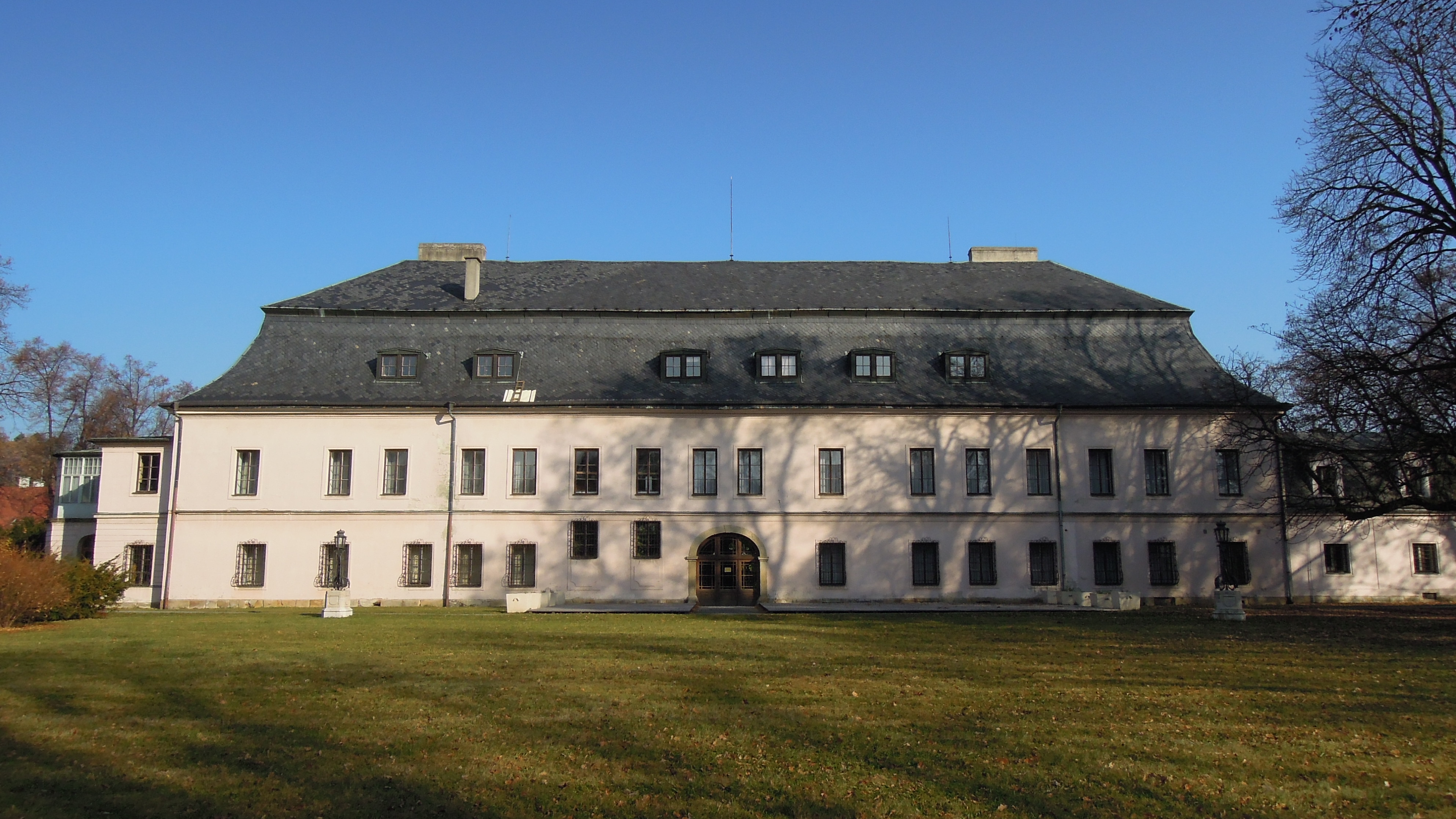
Kinský Castle

Valašské Meziříčí has a small historic centre formed by the town square and its surroundings, including the Žerotín Castle. The town square is lined by preserved burger houses. One of the most valuable monuments of the historic centre is the Church of the Assumption of the Virgin Mary. The originally Gothic parish church was first mentioned in 1419, after it replaced an old church from the 13th century. The Renaissance tower with a portal was added in 1581 and the Chapel of the Virgin Mary in the Baroque style was added in 1681–1682. In the mid-18th century, the church was rebuilt in the Baroque style.

The Žerotín Castle is one of the main landmarks of the town. Construction of the castle was started by Jan IV of Pernštejn in the first half of the 16th century. The originally Renaissance castle was rebuilt in the Baroque style by the Zierotins. After it was used as a women's prison and military infirmary in the 20th century, it was reconstructed and today serves as a cultural centre of the town.

The Kinský Castle was originally a Baroque building that housed the Krásno manor administration. In the mid-19th century it was rebuilt by the Kinsky family to an Empire castle. Since 1949, the castle has been used as a museum, today the Wallachian Regional Museum. Adjacent to the castle is a large English park with valuable tree species, founded at the turn of the 18th and 19th centuries.

The Moravská gobelínová manufaktura includes a museum of tapestry manufactory and a gallery of modern and historical tapestries.

The Holocaust Monument from 2004 is located on the site where the synagogue stood until its demolition in 1949.

== Notable people ==
- Franziskus von Sales Bauer (1841–1915), Roman Catholic cardinal
- Bohumil Mořkovský (1899–1928), gymnast
- Chaim Yahil (1905–1974), Israeli diplomat
- Rudolf Pernický (1915–2005), soldier and paratrooper
- František Hanus (1916–1991), actor
- Václav Kašlík (1917–1989), composer, opera director and conductor
- Jiří Dadák (1926–2014), athlete
- Jiří Křižan (1941–2010), screenwriter, writer and politician
- Alena Mornštajnová (born 1963), writer and translator
- František Jež (born 1970), ski jumper
- René Bolf (born 1974), footballer
- Helena Zeťová (born 1980), singer
- Milan Baroš (born 1981), footballer
- Jaroslav Levinský (born 1981), tennis player
- Iveta Benešová (born 1983), tennis player
- Robin Kovář (born 1984), ice hockey player
- Josef Vávra (born 1984), ice hockey player
- Tomáš Berdych (born 1985), tennis player
- Miroslav Jurka (born 1987), handball player
- Markéta Irglová (born 1988), musician and actress
- Petra Smaržová (born 1990), Slovak disabled skier
- Martin Doležal (born 1990), footballer
- Peter Šlachta (born 1993), handball player
- Zdeněk Stromšík (born 1994), athlete
- Roman Staněk (born 2004), racing driver

== Twin towns – sister cities ==
Valašské Meziříčí is twinned with:

- Balchik, Bulgaria
- Budva, Montenegro
- Čačak, Serbia
- Čadca, Slovakia
- Gooise Meren, Netherlands
- Konin, Poland
- Partizánske, Slovakia
- Sevlievo, Bulgaria
- Velké Meziříčí, Czech Republic
