= 2015 World Men's Handball Championship squads =

This article displays the squads for the 2015 World Men's Handball Championship. Each team consists of 16 players. Yet, two players might be replaced, Every player who played is listed, thus some lists have more than 16.

Age, caps and goals correct as of 15 January 2015.

== Group A ==
=== Belarus ===
A 21-player preliminary squad was announced on 19 December 2014.

Head coach: (Belarus) Yuri Shevtsov

No.	Pos.	Name	Date of birth (age)	Height	App.	Goals	Club
2	LW	Ivan Brouka	20 April 1980 (aged 34)	1.78 m	138	510	(Belarus) SKA Minsk
4	P	Maxim Babichev	7 March 1986 (aged 28)	2.00 m	104	174	(Belarus) Meshkov Brest
8	LW	Dzmitry Kamyshyk	1 May 1990 (aged 24)	2.00 m	61	145	(Belarus) Meshkov Brest
9	RB	Aleh Astrashapkin	20 January 1992 (aged 22)	1.90 m	6	4	(Belarus) Meshkov Brest
10	CB	Barys Pukhouski	3 January 1987 (aged 28)	1.84 m	117	503	(Hungary) Csurgó
12	GK	Ivan Matskevich	8 May 1991 (aged 23)	1.86 m	11	0	(Belarus) SKA Minsk
13	RB	Kiryl Kniazeu	9 March 1990 (aged 24)	1.95 m	31	62	(Belarus) SKA Minsk
14	LB	Siarhei Rutenka	29 August 1981 (aged 33)	1.98 m	49	317	(Spain) FC Barcelona
15	RW	Dzianis Rutenka	14 February 1986 (aged 28)	1.90 m	72	179	(Belarus) Meshkov Brest
17	CB	Dzmitry Nikulenkau	12 July 1984 (aged 30)	1.88 m	65	199	(Belarus) Meshkov Brest
18	RB	Siarhei Shylovich	16 May 1986 (aged 28)	1.95 m	80	258	(Belarus) Meshkov Brest
19	P	Mikhail Niazhura	9 December 1980 (aged 34)	2.00 m	63	8	(Belarus) Gomel
20	LB	Dzmitry Chystabayeu	23 December 1986 (aged 28)	2.00 m	56	36	(Russia) Permskie Medvedi
21	GK	Vitali Charapenka	27 January 1984 (aged 30)	1.93 m	60	0	(Belarus) Meshkov Brest
22	P	Viachaslau Shumak	22 December 1988 (aged 26)	2.03 m	60	110	(Belarus) Meshkov Brest
24	RW	Maksim Baranau	11 April 1988 (aged 26)	1.88 m	84	193	(Belarus) Meshkov Brest
55	P	Aliaksandr Tsitou	28 October 1986 (aged 28)	1.90 m	107	104	(Ukraine) Motor Zaporizhzhia

=== Brazil ===
A 20-player preliminary squad was announced on 23 December 2014. On 31 December 2014, 17 players were nominated.

Head coach: (Spain) Jordi Ribera

No.	Pos.	Name	Date of birth (age)	Height	App.	Goals	Club
2	CB	Henrique Teixeira	27 February 1989 (aged 25)	1.92 m	66	102	(Brazil) Taubaté
3	RB	Fernando Pacheco Filho	25 May 1983 (aged 31)	1.90 m	148	455	(Brazil) EC Pinheiros
4	CB	João Pedro Silva	29 January 1994 (aged 20)	1.90 m	24	40	(Spain) Ademar León
7	LB	Guilherme Gama	25 January 1991 (aged 23)	1.92 m	40	65	(Spain) Fraikin Granollers
9	RW	Lucas Cândido	19 March 1989 (aged 25)	1.82 m	30	60	(Brazil) Taubaté
10	RB	José Toledo	11 January 1994 (aged 21)	1.93 m	23	65	(Spain) Fraikin Granollers
13	CB	Diogo Hubner	30 January 1983 (aged 31)	1.88 m	55	95	(Brazil) Taubaté
14	LB	Thiagus dos Santos	25 January 1989 (aged 25)	1.99 m	74	120	(Spain) Logroño
15	LB	Arthur Patrianova	22 April 1993 (aged 21)	1.90 m	34	71	(Spain) Villa de Aranda
17	P	Alexandro Pozzer	21 December 1988 (aged 26)	1.92 m	37	54	(Spain) Guadalajara
18	LW	Felipe Ribeiro	4 May 1985 (aged 29)	1.85 m	169	597	(France) Montpellier
19	RW	Fábio Chiuffa	10 March 1989 (aged 25)	1.87 m	76	128	(Spain) Guadalajara
21	RB	Gustavo Cardoso	9 January 1982 (aged 33)	1.92 m	92	210	(Brazil) Taubaté
25	P	Vinícius Teixeira	3 April 1988 (aged 26)	1.90 m	99	161	(Brazil) EC Pinheiros
81	GK	Luís Ricardo Nascimento	24 September 1981 (aged 33)	2.00 m	103	0	(Brazil) Taubaté
89	GK	César Almeida	6 January 1989 (aged 26)	1.87 m	35	0	(Spain) Guadalajara

=== Chile ===
A 28-player preliminary squad was announced on 15 December 2014.

Head coach: Fernando Capurro

No.	Pos.	Name	Date of birth (age)	Height	App.	Goals	Club
1	GK	Felipe Barrientos	12 June 1984 (aged 30)	1.87 m	75	1	(Chile) Italiano
2	LW	Sebastián Ceballos	1 July 1992 (aged 22)	1.75 m	16	31	(Spain) Zamora
5	CB	Nicolás Jofre	16 October 1984 (aged 30)	1.80 m	73	66	(Chile) Santiago Steel
6	RB	Rodrigo Díaz	31 August 1988 (aged 26)	1.95 m	32	60	(Chile) Italiano
7	LB	Diego Reyes	24 July 1992 (aged 22)	1.82 m	37	59	(Spain) Zamora
8	RW	Erik Caniu	2 October 1988 (aged 26)	1.85 m	5	9	(Chile) Luterano
9	LW	Benjamín Callejas	2 May 1990 (aged 24)	1.70 m	10	14	(Chile) Ovalle
10	CB	Cristián Moll Ramírez	13 March 1993 (aged 21)	1.85 m	32	44	(Spain) Pedro Alonso Niño
11	L	Esteban Salinas	18 January 1992 (aged 22)	1.80 m	41	92	(Spain) Zamora
12	GK	Felipe García	20 October 1993 (aged 21)	1.88 m	17	0	(Chile) Santiago Steel
13	CB	Guillermo Araya	6 August 1985 (aged 29)	1.85 m	73	90	(Chile) Ovalle
15	L	Cristóbal del Río	11 March 1988 (aged 26)	1.95 m	38	41	(Chile) Santiago Steel
16	GK	René Oliva	7 March 1987 (aged 27)	1.96 m	48	0	(Chile) Ovalle
17	RB	Rodrigo Salinas Muñoz	25 February 1989 (aged 25)	1.88 m	62	172	(Romania) Steaua București
18	LB	Cornejo Rodolfo	7 September 1983 (aged 31)	1.90 m	18	30	(Chile) Santiago Steel
19	RW	Francisco Salazar	4 August 1992 (aged 22)	1.78 m	14	25	(Spain) Octavio Pilotes Posada
23	LB	Javier Frelijj	28 January 1991 (aged 23)	1.90 m	5	24	(Chile) Luterano
29	L	Marco Oneto (c)	3 June 1982 (aged 32)	2.04 m	87	195	(Germany) GWD Minden

=== Qatar ===
A 28-player preliminary squad was announced on 15 December 2014.

Head coach: (Spain) Valero Rivera

No.	Pos.	Name	Date of birth (age)	Height	App.	Goals	Club
1	LB	Žarko Marković	1 June 1986 (aged 28)	1.96 m	0	0	(Qatar) El Jaish
4	LB	Hassan Mabrouk	29 July 1982 (aged 32)	1.90 m	27	55	(Qatar) El Jaish
7	LB	Bertrand Roiné	17 February 1981 (aged 33)	1.98 m	11	35	(Qatar) Lekhwiya
9	RB	Rafael Capote	5 October 1987 (aged 27)	1.96 m	15	51	(Qatar) El Jaish
10	RW	Abdulla Al-Karbi	10 June 1990 (aged 24)	1.77 m	33	105	(Qatar) Al Sadd
11	LW	Abdulrazzaq Murad	29 June 1990 (aged 24)	1.86 m	59	122	(Qatar) Al-Gharafa
12	GK	Danijel Šarić	27 June 1977 (aged 37)	1.95 m	0	0	(Spain) FC Barcelona
13	RW	Eldar Memišević	21 June 1992 (aged 22)	1.78 m	84	171	(Qatar) El Jaish
16	GK	Goran Stojanović	24 February 1977 (aged 37)	1.91 m	15	0	(Qatar) El Jaish
19	P	Borja Vidal	25 December 1981 (aged 33)	2.06 m	15	38	(Qatar) Al-Qiyada
20	LB	Jovo Damjanović	24 December 1996 (age 29)	1.91 m	26	34	(Qatar) El Jaish
25	CB	Kamalaldin Mallash	1 January 1992 (aged 23)	1.80 m	28	83	(Qatar) El Jaish
41	P	Youssef Benali	28 May 1987 (aged 27)	1.93 m	15	51	(Qatar) Lekhwiya
66	LW	Hamad Madadi	7 July 1988 (aged 26)	1.78 m	38	200	(Qatar) Lekhwiya
77	RB	Hadi Hamdoon	5 February 1992 (aged 22)	1.83 m	55	167	(Qatar) El Jaish
86	CB	Mahmoud Hassab Alla	22 November 1986 (aged 28)	1.82 m	8	24	(Qatar) Al Sadd
94	LB	Ameen Zakkar	15 June 1994 (aged 20)	1.95 m	26	42	(Saudi Arabia) Al-Noor

=== Slovenia ===
A 26-player preliminary squad was announced on 15 December 2014. It was trimmed down to 22 on 2 January 2015. On 7 January 2015, 19 players were nominated.

Head coach: Boris Denič

No.	Pos.	Name	Date of birth (age)	Height	App.	Goals	Club
7	RB	Vid Kavtičnik	24 May 1984 (aged 30)	1.91 m	134	399	(France) Montpellier
9	RB	Jure Natek	30 March 1982 (aged 32)	1.93 m	138	353	(Germany) SC Magdeburg
10	LB	Klemen Cehte	10 May 1986 (aged 28)	1.96 m	25	57	(France) Pays d'Aix UCH
11	RB	Jure Dolenec	6 December 1988 (aged 26)	1.90 m	66	259	(France) Montpellier
12	GK	Gorazd Škof	11 July 1977 (aged 37)	1.88 m	155	0	(France) Nantes
13	LB	David Špiler	2 January 1983 (aged 32)	1.90 m	120	278	(Belarus) Meshkov Brest
14	CB	Sebastian Skube	3 April 1987 (aged 27)	1.89 m	95	220	(Denmark) Bjerringbro-Silkeborg
16	GK	Primož Prošt	14 July 1983 (aged 31)	1.86 m	68	0	(Germany) Frisch Auf Göppingen
19	P	Miha Žvižej	6 November 1987 (aged 27)	1.93 m	79	185	(France) Fenix Toulouse
20	LW	Luka Žvižej	9 December 1980 (aged 34)	1.85 m	191	637	(Slovenia) Celje
21	P	Blaž Blagotinšek	17 January 1994 (aged 20)	2.02 m	4	2	(Slovenia) Celje
22	P	Matej Gaber	22 July 1991 (aged 23)	1.97 m	52	55	(France) Montpellier
23	CB	Uroš Zorman (c)	9 January 1980 (aged 35)	1.90 m	190	467	(Poland) Vive Targi Kielce
25	CB	Marko Bezjak	26 June 1986 (aged 28)	1.84 m	60	82	(Germany) SC Magdeburg
27	LB	Miladin Kozlina	11 February 1983 (aged 31)	1.98 m	105	235	(Germany) GWD Minden
30	RW	Dragan Gajić	21 July 1984 (aged 30)	1.88 m	130	512	(France) Montpellier
33	P	Uroš Bundalo	29 April 1989 (aged 25)	1.98 m	43	44	Tremblay-en-France
44	CB	Dean Bombač	4 April 1989 (aged 25)	1.89 m	35	50	(Hungary) MOL-Pick Szeged

=== Spain ===
A 20-player preliminary squad was announced on 16 December 2014. On 29 December 2014 an 18-player list was published. On 12 January 2015, the final 16-player squad was announced.

Head coach: Manolo Cadenas

No.	Pos.	Name	Date of birth (age)	Height	App.	Goals	Club
4	RW	Albert Rocas	16 June 1982 (aged 32)	1.88 m	162	555	(Spain) Logroño
5	RB	Jorge Maqueda	6 February 1988 (aged 26)	1.97 m	87	214	(France) Nantes
8	RW	Víctor Tomás	15 February 1985 (aged 29)	1.78 m	131	430	(Spain) FC Barcelona
9	CB	Raúl Entrerríos (c)	12 February 1981 (aged 33)	1.93 m	184	402	(Spain) FC Barcelona
12	GK	José Manuel Sierra	21 May 1978 (aged 36)	1.94 m	111	0	(Hungary) MOL-Pick Szeged
13	P	Julen Aguinagalde	8 December 1982 (aged 32)	1.95 m	120	328	(Poland) Vive Targi Kielce
15	LW	Cristian Ugalde	19 October 1987 (aged 27)	1.87 m	105	235	(Hungary) MKB-MVM Veszprém
19	P	Juan Andreu	20 January 1985 (aged 29)	1.97 m	38	74	(Germany) TSV Hannover-Burgdorf
20	CB	Chema Rodríguez	5 January 1980 (aged 35)	1.87 m	113	150	(Hungary) MKB-MVM Veszprém
21	CB	Joan Cañellas	30 September 1986 (aged 28)	1.98 m	104	282	(Germany) THW Kiel
24	LB	Viran Morros	15 December 1983 (aged 31)	1.99 m	137	133	(Spain) FC Barcelona
26	LB	Antonio García Robledo	6 March 1984 (aged 30)	1.91 m	47	91	(Hungary) MOL-Pick Szeged
28	LW	Valero Rivera Folch	22 February 1985 (aged 29)	1.85 m	45	125	(France) Nantes
30	P	Gedeón Guardiola	1 October 1984 (aged 30)	2.00 m	61	76	(Germany) Rhein-Neckar Löwen
33	GK	Gonzalo Pérez de Vargas	10 January 1991 (aged 24)	1.89 m	125	0	(Spain) FC Barcelona
40	RB	Alex Dujshebaev	17 December 1992 (aged 22)	1.87 m	7	13	(North Macedonia) Vardar

== Group B ==
=== Austria ===
A 23-player preliminary squad was announced on 2 January 2015. On 9 January 2015, an 18-player squad was announced.

Head coach: (Iceland) Patrekur Jóhannesson

No.	Pos.	Name	Date of birth (age)	Height	App.	Goals	Club
1	GK	Thomas Bauer	24 January 1986 (aged 28)	1.90 m	91	0	(Germany) TBV Lemgo
2	LB	Alexander Hermann	10 December 1991 (aged 23)	1.92 m	34	44	(Austria) SG West Wien
4	RB	Maximilian Hermann	10 December 1991 (aged 23)	1.94 m	32	62	(Germany) Bergischer HC
5	CB	Vytautas Žiūra	11 May 1979 (aged 35)	1.89 m	79	171	(Austria) Fivers Margareten
7	RB	Janko Bozovic	14 July 1985 (aged 29)	2.04 m	85	197	(Belarus) Meshkov Brest
10	RB	Lucas Mayer	16 February 1983 (aged 31)	1.86 m	70	147	(Austria) Bregenz
12	GK	Nikola Marinovic	29 August 1976 (aged 38)	1.98 m	143	0	(Germany) Frisch Auf Göppingen
14	CB	Viktor Szilágyi	16 September 1978 (aged 36)	1.95 m	187	853	(Germany) Bergischer HC
15	P	Fabian Posch	5 January 1988 (aged 27)	1.98 m	80	96	(Austria) SG West Wien
21	LB	Roland Schlinger	17 September 1982 (aged 32)	1.92 m	160	584	(Austria) Alpla HC Hard
22	P	Markus Wagesreiter	14 January 1982 (aged 33)	1.98 m	134	107	(Austria) SG West Wien
25	LW	Dominik Ascherbauer	21 August 1989 (aged 25)	1.91 m	6	14	(Austria) HC Linz
27	RW	Marian Klopcic	14 January 1992 (aged 22)	1.84 m	17	14	(Austria) Bregenz
28	RW	Robert Weber	25 November 1985 (aged 29)	1.79 m	125	497	(Germany) SC Magdeburg
53	CB	Nikola Bilyk	28 November 1996 (aged 18)	1.98 m	5	6	(Austria) Fivers Margareten
92	LW	Raul Santos	1 June 1992 (aged 22)	1.80 m	45	170	(Germany) VfL Gummersbach
95	LB	Romas Kirveliavičius	5 March 1988 (aged 26)	2.00 m	4	3	(Germany) SG BBM Bietigheim

=== Bosnia and Herzegovina ===
A 23-player preliminary squad was announced on 17 December 2014. It was trimmed down to 20 on 30 December 2014.

Head coach: Dragan Marković

No.	Pos.	Name	Date of birth (age)	Height	App.	Goals	Club
1	GK	Nebojša Grahovac	11 February 1984 (aged 30)	1.91 m	64	1	(France) Chartres
2	RW	Faruk Vražalić	22 June 1990 (aged 24)	1.83 m	29	107	(Germany) HBW Balingen-Weilstetten
3	LW	Alen Ovčina	27 February 1989 (aged 25)	1.90 m	10	28	(Qatar) Al-Shamal
4	CB	Josip Perić	5 June 1992 (aged 22)	1.80 m	6	6	(Hungary) Tatabánya
5	LW	Mirko Mikić	23 August 1985 (aged 29)	1.85 m	20	23	(Bosnia and Herzegovina) Borac Banja Luka
8	P	Senjamin Burić	20 November 1990 (aged 24)	1.96 m	31	31	(Slovenia) Gorenje
11	CB	Stefan Janković	20 August 1992 (aged 22)	1.89 m	2	0	(Bosnia and Herzegovina) Borac Banja Luka
12	GK	Benjamin Burić	20 November 1990 (aged 24)	1.97 m	25	0	(Slovenia) Gorenje
13	RB	Kosta Savić	15 December 1987 (aged 27)	1.92 m	28	54	(Poland) Azoty-Puławy
14	LB	Mirsad Terzić	12 July 1983 (aged 31)	1.96 m	114	388	(Hungary) MKB-MVM Veszprém
15	P	Muhamed Toromanović (c)	9 April 1984 (aged 30)	1.94 m	111	383	(France) US Créteil
16	GK	Peđa Dejanović	6 March 1982 (aged 32)	1.89 m	4	0	(Spain) Bidasoa Irún
17	LB	Duško Čelica	16 August 1986 (aged 28)	1.98 m	23	50	(Croatia) Zagreb
18	CB	Ivan Karačić	26 May 1985 (aged 29)	1.90 m	30	75	(Belarus) Meshkov Brest
19	LB	Nikola Prce	31 August 1980 (aged 34)	2.00 m	66	232	(Poland) Azoty-Puławy
21	P	Vladimir Vranješ	14 December 1988 (aged 26)	2.02 m	33	32	(Hungary) MOL-Pick Szeged
22	RB	Dejan Malinović	12 April 1992 (aged 22)	1.91 m	19	47	(France) US Créteil
24	RW	Muhamed Zulfić	13 May 1992 (aged 22)	1.88 m	0	0	(Bosnia and Herzegovina) Bosna Sarajevo

=== Croatia ===
A 20-player preliminary squad was announced on 23 December 2014. An 18-player squad was announced on 30 December 2014. A final 16-player squad was announced on 13 January 2015.

Head coach: Slavko Goluža

No.	Pos.	Name	Date of birth (age)	Height	App.	Goals	Club
5	CB	Domagoj Duvnjak	1 June 1988 (aged 26)	1.97 m	136	435	(Germany) THW Kiel
7	RB	Luka Stepančić	20 November 1990 (aged 24)	2.03 m	16	26	(Croatia) Zagreb
8	RB	Marko Kopljar	12 February 1986 (aged 28)	2.10 m	109	210	(France) Paris Saint-Germain
9	P	Igor Vori (c)	20 September 1980 (aged 34)	2.03 m	223	562	(France) Paris Saint-Germain
10	LB	Jakov Gojun	18 April 1986 (aged 28)	2.04 m	108	66	(France) Paris Saint-Germain
13	RW	Zlatko Horvat	25 September 1984 (aged 30)	1.79 m	98	246	(Croatia) Zagreb
16	GK	Filip Ivić	30 August 1992 (aged 22)	1.95 m	17	0	(Croatia) Zagreb
18	CB	Igor Karačić	2 November 1988 (aged 26)	1.89 m	10	37	(North Macedonia) Vardar
20	LB	Damir Bičanić	29 June 1985 (aged 29)	1.94 m	78	153	(France) Chambéry
25	GK	Mirko Alilović	15 September 1985 (aged 29)	2.00 m	137	0	(Hungary) MKB-MVM Veszprém
26	LW	Manuel Štrlek	1 December 1988 (aged 26)	1.81 m	82	259	(Poland) Vive Targi Kielce
27	RW	Ivan Čupić	27 March 1986 (aged 28)	1.78 m	97	378	(Poland) Vive Targi Kielce
28	P	Željko Musa	8 January 1986 (aged 29)	2.00 m	73	48	(Poland) Vive Targi Kielce
29	LW	Ivan Ninčević	27 October 1981 (aged 33)	1.84 m	65	96	(Turkey) Beşiktaş
32	LB	Ivan Slišković	23 October 1991 (aged 23)	1.97 m	20	49	(Slovenia) Celje
34	P	Ilija Brozović	26 May 1991 (aged 23)	1.95 m	0	0	(Croatia) Zagreb

=== Iran ===
A 22-player preliminary squad was announced on 28 December 2014. An 18-player squad was revealed on 13 January 2015.

Head coach: (Slovenia) Borut Maček

No.	Pos.	Name	Date of birth (age)	Height	App.	Goals	Club
2	LW	Mojtaba Heidarpour	20 September 1988 (aged 26)	1.80 m	21	75	(Iran) Samen Sabzevar
3	LB	Mohammad Reza Rajabi	10 January 1986 (aged 29)	1.90 m	145	662	(Iraq) Naft Al-Janoob
4	RW	Milad Masaeli	28 May 1988 (aged 26)	1.92 m	72	245	(Iran) Samen Sabzevar
5	RB	Shahoo Nosrati	16 January 1989 (aged 25)	1.87 m	unknown	unknown	(Romania) HC Buzău
6	LB	Sajjad Esteki	23 April 1990 (aged 24)	1.90 m	63	350	(Iran) Samen Sabzevar
7	CB	Pouya Norouzinejad	23 June 1994 (aged 20)	1.89 m	27	70	(Iran) Magnesium Ferdows
8	P	Alireza Mousavi	27 April 1990 (aged 24)	1.97 m	97	360	(Hungary) Tatabánya
9	P	Mehdi Bijari	5 December 1983 (aged 31)	1.91 m	47	95	(Iran) Samen Sabzevar
10	CB	Allahkaram Esteki	19 March 1988 (aged 26)	1.94 m	95	437	(Iran) Samen Sabzevar
17	P	Mojtaba Karamian	13 March 1989 (aged 25)	1.98 m	23	98	(Iran) Magnesium Ferdows
18	LW	Ehsan Abouei	5 March 1990 (aged 24)	1.76 m	35	180	(Iran) Shahrdari Tabriz
20	LW	Amin Kazemi	7 May 1988 (aged 26)	1.86 m	57	195	(Iran) Bafgh Yazd
22	RB	Sajjad Nadri	28 May 1990 (aged 24)	1.94 m	40	182	(Iran) Samen Sabzevar
23	GK	Saeid Heidarirad	22 September 1990 (aged 24)	1.93 m	32	0	(Iran) Sanat Mes Kerman
24	LB	Afshin Sadeghi	25 March 1993 (aged 21)	1.83 m	21	55	(Iran) Samen Mashhad
26	GK	Mohsen Babasafari	28 June 1987 (aged 27)	1.95 m	32	0	(Hungary) Tatabánya
36	RB	Jalal Kiani	28 September 1989 (aged 25)	1.83 m	42	122	(Iran) Magnesium Ferdows
87	RW	Omid Sekenari	24 April 1988 (aged 26)	1.83 m	63	226	(Iran) Magnesium Ferdows
89	GK	Saeid Barkhordari	7 May 1989 (aged 25)	1.90 m	55	0	(Iran) Samen Sabzevar

=== Macedonia ===
A 21-player preliminary squad was announced on 15 December 2014. An 18-player squad was announced on 5 January 2015.

Head coach: (Croatia) Ivica Obrvan

No.	Pos.	Name	Date of birth (age)	Height	App.	Goals	Club
3	LW	Dejan Manaskov	26 August 1992 (aged 22)	1.80 m	26	50	(North Macedonia) Metalurg Skopje
4	RB	Renato Vugrinec	6 September 1975 (aged 39)	1.96 m	4	7	(North Macedonia) Metalurg Skopje
5	P	Stojanče Stoilov	30 April 1987 (aged 27)	1.92 m	23	37	(North Macedonia) Vardar
7	RB	Kiril Lazarov (c)	10 May 1980 (aged 34)	1.93 m	109	901	(Spain) FC Barcelona
9	CB	Aco Jonovski	29 December 1980 (aged 34)	1.97 m	66	67	(North Macedonia) Metalurg Skopje
13	CB	Filip Mirkulovski	14 September 1983 (aged 31)	1.89 m	116	293	(North Macedonia) Metalurg Skopje
14	LB	Velko Markoski	5 April 1986 (aged 28)	1.94 m	34	47	(North Macedonia) Metalurg Skopje
15	RW	Zlatko Mojsoski	15 November 1981 (aged 33)	1.80 m	26	34	(North Macedonia) Prilep
16	GK	Borko Ristovski	2 November 1982 (aged 32)	1.90 m	112	3	(France) US Créteil
17	P	Nikola Markoski	22 May 1990 (aged 24)	1.96 m	15	8	(North Macedonia) Metalurg Skopje
18	LB	Naumče Mojsovski	17 June 1980 (aged 34)	1.87 m	98	130	(North Macedonia) Metalurg Skopje
20	GK	Petar Angelov	8 March 1977 (aged 37)	1.85 m	41	0	(North Macedonia) Vardar
21	CB	Nemanja Pribak	26 March 1984 (aged 30)	1.90 m	7	8	(North Macedonia) Vardar
22	RW	Goce Georgievski	12 February 1987 (aged 27)	1.85 m	31	46	(North Macedonia) Metalurg Skopje
23	LB	Filip Lazarov	21 April 1985 (aged 29)	1.97 m	37	101	(North Macedonia) Vardar
24	LW	Vlado Nedanovski	23 June 1985 (aged 29)	1.87 m	20	50	(North Macedonia) Vardar

=== Tunisia ===
An 18-player preliminary squad was announced on 30 December 2014.

Head coach: (Croatia) Sead Hasanefendić

No.	Pos.	Name	Date of birth (age)	Height	App.	Goals	Club
1	GK	Hamza Majed	8 February 1983 (aged 31)	1.86 m	43	0	(Qatar) Al Rayyan
3	LB	Selim Hedoui	1 October 1983 (aged 31)	1.99 m	218	398	(Qatar) Al-Arabi
4	LW	Aymen Toumi	11 July 1990 (aged 24)	1.84 m	71	123	(France) Nantes
5	P	Mahmoud Gharbi	11 February 1982 (aged 32)	1.91 m	179	289	(France) Nantes
6	P	Issam Tej (c)	29 July 1979 (aged 35)	1.87 m	293	770	(France) Montpellier
7	RW	Jaleleddine Touati	12 July 1982 (aged 32)	1.79 m	194	397	(France) Dunkerque
8	LB	Wissem Hmam	21 April 1981 (aged 33)	1.98 m	234	761	(France) Saint-Raphaël VHB
9	RB	Amine Bannour	21 February 1990 (aged 24)	1.97 m	34	116	(Tunisia) Club Africain
10	CB	Kamel Alouini	6 July 1988 (aged 26)	1.87 m	92	210	(Tunisia) Espérance de Tunis
12	GK	Marouen Maggaiz	28 July 1983 (aged 31)	1.91 m	146	3	(Tunisia) Espérance de Tunis
17	LB	Wael Jallouz	3 May 1991 (aged 23)	1.98 m	75	171	(Spain) FC Barcelona
19	LB	Mosbah Sanaï	26 March 1991 (aged 23)	1.92 m	59	147	(Qatar) El Jaish
20	CB	Heykel Megannem	28 February 1977 (aged 37)	1.86 m	276	615	(Qatar) El Jaish
21	LW	Oussama Boughanmi	5 February 1990 (aged 24)	1.86 m	76	295	Tremblay-en-France
25	CB	Abdelhak Ben Salah	25 April 1990 (aged 24)	1.84 m	35	69	(Tunisia) Club Africain
27	RB	Aymen Hammed	26 July 1983 (aged 31)	1.96 m	100	352	(Tunisia) Espérance de Tunis
31	P	Marouan Chouiref	27 May 1990 (aged 24)	1.97 m	63	52	Tremblay-en-France

== Group C ==
=== Algeria ===
A 24-player preliminary squad was announced on 20 December 2014.

Head coach: Reda Zeguili

No.	Pos.	Name	Date of birth (age)	Height	App.	Goals	Club
5	CB	Khaled Chentout	29 March 1984 (aged 30)	1.94 m	12	19	(Norway) Nøtterøy HB
6	LB	Messaoud Berkous (c)	20 July 1989 (aged 25)	1.89 m	58	89	(Algeria) GS Pétroliers
7	LW	Hichem Daoud	9 January 1992 (aged 23)	1.90 m	16	36	(Algeria) CRB Baraki
10	LB	Sassi Boultif	9 January 1983 (aged 32)	1.91 m	50	83	(United Arab Emirates) Al-Nasr
12	GK	Abdellah Benmenni	19 August 1986 (aged 28)	1.94 m	6	0	(Algeria) GS Pétroliers
13	LW	Riadh Chahbour	28 July 1985 (aged 29)	1.85 m	43	86	(Algeria) GS Pétroliers
14	RW	Rabah Soudani	8 April 1985 (aged 29)	1.92 m	31	36	(France) Cherbourg
15	LB	Tarek Boukhmis	14 April 1980 (aged 34)	1.90 m	24	61	(Algeria) JSE Skikda
16	GK	Adel Bousmal	1 May 1985 (aged 29)	1.94 m	31	0	(Algeria) GS Boufarik
17	RB	Abderrahim Berriah	14 April 1980 (aged 34)	1.95 m	58	82	(Algeria) GS Pétroliers
18	P	Hichem Kaabeche	12 March 1990 (aged 24)	1.92 m	57	73	(Algeria) JSE Skikda
19	LW	Ayat Hamoud	10 August 1990 (aged 24)	1.78 m	41	63	(Algeria) ES Ain Touta
20	RB	El Hadi Biloum	26 May 1981 (aged 33)	1.92 m	60	102	(France) Martigues
21	P	Mohamed Mokrani	31 January 1981 (aged 33)	1.88 m	33	40	(France) Dunkerque
22	GK	Abdelmalek Slahdji	8 August 1983 (aged 31)	1.90 m	70	0	(Algeria) GS Pétroliers
24	RW	Messaoud Layadi	24 March 1982 (aged 32)	1.90 m	24	60	(Algeria) GS Pétroliers
25	LB	Belgacem Filah	19 January 1988 (aged 26)	1.98 m	73	109	(Algeria) GS Pétroliers

=== Czech Republic ===
A 13-player squad was announced on 11 December 2014. 18 players were selected on 9 January 2015. The 16-player squad was published on 10 January 2015.

Head coach: Jan Filip / Daniel Kubeš

No.	Pos.	Name	Date of birth (age)	Height	App.	Goals	Club
2	LW	Jakub Hrstka	17 March 1990 (aged 24)	1.86 m	47	135	(Slovakia) Tatran Prešov
3	CB	Roman Bečvář	18 April 1989 (aged 25)	1.91 m	52	134	(Germany) Empor Rostock
5	RW	Miroslav Jurka	7 June 1987 (aged 27)	1.89 m	36	73	(France) Saint-Raphaël VHB
8	LW	Jiří Motl	29 September 1984 (aged 30)	1.84 m	74	142	(Czech Republic) Lovosice
9	LB	Filip Jícha	19 April 1982 (aged 32)	2.01 m	148	816	(Germany) THW Kiel
11	RW	Jan Sobol	22 May 1984 (aged 30)	1.88 m	101	274	(Poland) Azoty-Puławy
13	LB	Pavel Horák	28 November 1982 (aged 32)	1.98 m	77	257	(Germany) Füchse Berlin
16	GK	Martin Galia	12 April 1979 (aged 35)	1.89 m	143	3	(Switzerland) TSV St. Otmar St. Gallen
19	CB	Tomáš Babák	28 December 1993 (aged 21)	1.86 m	14	16	(Switzerland) TSV St. Otmar St. Gallen
22	RW	Petr Linhart	29 May 1990 (aged 24)	1.95 m	14	33	(Czech Republic) Talent Plzeň
23	P	Leoš Petrovský	5 January 1993 (aged 22)	2.02 m	5	11	(Czech Republic) Talent Plzeň
27	CB	Ondřej Zdráhala	10 July 1983 (aged 31)	1.87 m	66	157	(Germany) ASV Hamm-Westfalen
32	P	Jakub Šindelář	20 November 1986 (aged 28)	1.95 m	17	6	(Czech Republic) Talent Plzeň
41	LB	Michal Kasal	3 April 1994 (aged 20)	2.09 m	16	14	(Slovenia) Celje
42	CB	Jakub Szymanski	9 February 1983 (aged 31)	1.98 m	41	52	(Switzerland) TSV St. Otmar St. Gallen
71	GK	Petr Štochl	24 April 1976 (aged 38)	1.93 m	182	2	(Germany) Füchse Berlin

=== Egypt ===
A 19-player preliminary squad was announced on 12 December 2014.

Head coach: Marwan Ragab

No.	Pos.	Name	Date of birth (age)	Height	App.	Goals	Club
3	RB	Mamdouh Abouebaid	1 January 1988 (aged 27)	1.87 m	70	280	(Egypt) Al Ahly
5	RW	Mahmoud Radwan	19 October 1989 (aged 25)	1.86 m	111	444	(Egypt) Al Ahly
6	P	Ahmed Abdelrahman	26 January 1984 (aged 30)	1.85 m	75	300	(Egypt) Al Ahly
8	P	Mahmoud Ramadan	7 March 1984 (aged 30)	1.85 m	205	615	(Egypt) Al Ahly
9	CB	Eslam Issa	2 July 1988 (aged 26)	1.86 m	180	270	(Tunisia) Club Africain
12	GK	Mohamed Bakir	6 April 1974 (aged 40)	1.95 m	350	0	(Egypt) Alexandria SC
13	LW	Omar El-Wakil	14 May 1988 (aged 26)	1.78 m	50	200	(Egypt) Al Ahly
15	RW	Mohamed Amer	12 December 1987 (aged 27)	1.87 m	45	180	(Egypt) Al Ahly
19	CB	Mohamed El-Bassiouny	10 May 1990 (aged 24)	1.86 m	110	440	(Egypt) Alexandria SC
20	CB	Mohamed Hashem	23 January 1988 (aged 26)	1.80 m	170	180	(Egypt) Aviation SC
24	P	Ibrahim El-Masry	11 March 1989 (aged 25)	1.95 m	95	380	(Egypt) Al Ahly
25	P	Wisam Nawar	14 February 1990 (aged 24)	1.88 m	53	318	(Egypt) Alexandria SC
39	LB	Yehia El-Deraa	17 July 1995 (aged 19)	1.90 m	35	120	(Egypt) Heliopolis SC
66	RB	Ahmed El-Ahmar	27 January 1984 (aged 30)	1.84 m	230	920	(Qatar) El Jaish
72	GK	Mahmoud Khalil	1 June 1991 (aged 23)	1.92 m	60	0	(Qatar) El Jaish
88	GK	Karim Handawy	1 May 1988 (aged 26)	1.86 m	175	0	(Egypt) Al Ahly
90	LB	Aly Zein	14 December 1990 (aged 24)	1.95 m	104	416	(United Arab Emirates) Al Jazira

=== France ===
A 20-player preliminary squad was announced on 6 December 2014. A 17-player squad was announced on 13 January 2015.

Head coach: Claude Onesta

No.	Pos.	Name	Date of birth (age)	Height	App.	Goals	Club
1	GK	Cyril Dumoulin	2 February 1984 (aged 30)	2.00 m	38	0	(France) Fenix Toulouse
2	LB	Jérôme Fernandez (c)	7 March 1977 (aged 37)	1.99 m	375	1443	(France) Fenix Toulouse
4	RB	Xavier Barachet	19 November 1988 (aged 26)	1.95 m	66	132	(France) Paris Saint-Germain
7	P	Igor Anić	12 June 1987 (aged 27)	1.94 m	24	31	(France) Nantes
8	CB	Daniel Narcisse	16 December 1979 (aged 35)	1.89 m	264	814	(France) Paris Saint-Germain
9	RW	Guillaume Joli	27 March 1985 (aged 29)	1.78 m	103	293	(Germany) HSG Wetzlar
10	RB	Alix Nyokas	28 June 1986 (aged 28)	1.88 m	29	44	(Germany) Frisch Auf Göppingen
11	LW	Samuel Honrubia	5 July 1986 (aged 28)	1.80 m	70	188	(France) Paris Saint-Germain
13	CB	Nikola Karabatić	11 April 1984 (aged 30)	1.96 m	234	964	(Spain) FC Barcelona
14	LW/CB	Kentin Mahé	22 May 1991 (aged 23)	1.85 m	20	31	(Germany) HSV Hamburg
15	LB	Mathieu Grébille	6 October 1991 (aged 23)	1.98 m	26	49	(France) Montpellier
16	GK	Thierry Omeyer	2 November 1976 (aged 38)	1.92 m	306	1	(France) Paris Saint-Germain
18	LB	William Accambray	8 April 1988 (aged 26)	1.94 m	73	177	(France) Paris Saint-Germain
20	P	Cédric Sorhaindo	7 June 1984 (aged 30)	1.92 m	129	251	(Spain) FC Barcelona
21	LW	Michaël Guigou	28 January 1982 (aged 32)	1.79 m	196	687	(France) Montpellier
22	P	Luka Karabatić	19 April 1988 (aged 26)	2.02 m	23	17	(France) Pays d'Aix UCH
28	RB	Valentin Porte	7 September 1990 (aged 24)	1.90 m	29	57	(France) Fenix Toulouse

=== Iceland ===
A 20-player preliminary squad was announced on 18 December 2014. On 11 January 2015 a 17-player squad was published.

Head coach: Aron Kristjánsson

No.	Pos.	Name	Date of birth (age)	Height	App.	Goals	Club
1	GK	Björgvin Páll Gústavsson	24 May 1985 (aged 29)	1.93 m	150	0	(Germany) Bergischer HC
2	P	Vignir Svavarsson	20 June 1980 (aged 34)	1.94 m	209	228	(Denmark) HC Midtjylland
3	P	Kári Kristjánsson	28 October 1984 (aged 30)	1.98 m	84	101	(Iceland) Valur
4	LB	Aron Pálmarsson	19 July 1990 (aged 24)	1.93 m	86	317	(Germany) THW Kiel
6	RB	Ásgeir Örn Hallgrímsson	17 February 1984 (aged 30)	1.91 m	206	339	(France) USAM Nîmes
7	LB	Arnór Atlason	23 July 1984 (aged 30)	1.91 m	154	377	(France) Saint-Raphaël VHB
9	LW	Guðjón Valur Sigurðsson (c)	8 August 1979 (aged 35)	1.87 m	302	1595	(Spain) FC Barcelona
10	CB	Snorri Guðjónsson	17 October 1981 (aged 33)	1.87 m	234	807	(France) Sélestat
12	GK	Aron Rafn Eðvarðsson	1 September 1989 (aged 25)	2.02 m	36	0	(Sweden) Eskilstuna Guif
14	RW	Arnór Þór Gunnarsson	23 October 1987 (aged 27)	1.81 m	34	64	(Germany) Bergischer HC
15	RB	Alexander Petersson	2 July 1980 (aged 34)	1.86 m	157	623	(Germany) Rhein-Neckar Löwen
17	P	Sverre Andreas Jakobsson	8 February 1977 (aged 37)	1.96 m	169	27	(Iceland) KA Akureyrar
18	P	Róbert Gunnarsson	22 May 1980 (aged 34)	1.90 m	248	720	(France) Paris Saint-Germain
19	LB	Sigurbergur Sveinsson	12 August 1987 (aged 27)	1.89 m	45	51	(Germany) HC Erlangen
22	LW	Stefán Rafn Sigurmannsson	19 May 1990 (aged 24)	1.96 m	30	31	(Germany) Rhein-Neckar Löwen
26	P	Bjarki Már Gunnarsson	10 August 1988 (aged 26)	2.01 m	23	6	(Germany) EHV Aue
27	CB	Gunnar Steinn Jónsson	4 May 1987 (aged 27)	1.95 m	18	14	(Germany) VfL Gummersbach

=== Sweden ===
The squad was announced on 15 December 2014. On 8 January 2015, Magnus Persson replaced Johan Jakobsson due to an injury.

Head coach: Ola Lindgren / Staffan Olsson

No.	Pos.	Name	Date of birth (age)	Height	App.	Goals	Club
1	GK	Mattias Andersson	29 March 1978 (aged 36)	1.85 m	110	0	(Germany) Flensburg-Handewitt
2	RB	Magnus Persson	17 December 1990 (aged 24)	1.92 m	20	27	(Germany) VfL Gummersbach
4	LB	Marcus Olsson	31 March 1990 (aged 24)	1.86 m	17	45	(Sweden) IFK Kristianstad
5	RB	Kim Andersson	21 August 1982 (aged 32)	1.99 m	209	751	(Denmark) KIF Kolding København
6	LW	Jonas Källman	17 July 1981 (aged 33)	2.00 m	187	551	(Hungary) MOL-Pick Szeged
8	CB	Lukas Karlsson	21 May 1982 (aged 32)	1.78 m	80	160	(Denmark) KIF Kolding København
10	RW	Niclas Ekberg	23 December 1988 (aged 26)	1.91 m	104	432	(Germany) THW Kiel
18	P	Tobias Karlsson	4 June 1981 (aged 33)	1.96 m	143	79	(Germany) Flensburg-Handewitt
21	CB	Patrik Fahlgren	27 June 1985 (aged 29)	1.88 m	43	62	(Germany) MT Melsungen
22	GK	Johan Sjöstrand	26 February 1987 (aged 27)	1.95 m	88	0	(Germany) THW Kiel
24	LW	Fredrik Petersen	27 August 1983 (aged 31)	1.88 m	118	332	(Germany) Füchse Berlin
26	RW	Anton Halén	28 November 1990 (aged 24)	1.92 m	10	22	(Germany) Frisch Auf Göppingen
27	P	Niclas Barud	22 March 1988 (aged 26)	1.96 m	30	16	(Denmark) Aalborg
31	LB	Viktor Östlund	19 January 1992 (aged 22)	1.98 m	7	13	(Sweden) Eskilstuna Guif
32	RW	Mattias Zachrisson	22 August 1990 (aged 24)	1.79 m	53	85	(Germany) Füchse Berlin
35	P	Andreas Nilsson	12 April 1990 (aged 24)	1.97 m	65	155	(Hungary) MKB-MVM Veszprém
36	P	Jesper Nielsen	30 August 1989 (aged 25)	2.00 m	35	30	(Germany) Füchse Berlin

== Group D ==
=== Argentina ===
An 18-player preliminary squad was announced on 26 December 2014.

Head coach: Eduardo Gallardo

No.	Pos.	Name	Date of birth (age)	Height	App.	Goals	Club
1	GK	Matías Schulz	12 February 1982 (aged 32)	1.90 m	107	3	(France) Nantes
2	LW	Federico Fernández	17 October 1989 (aged 25)	1.87 m	94	302	(Argentina) UNLu
3	RW	Federico Pizarro	6 July 1986 (aged 28)	1.83 m	67	232	(Argentina) UNLu
4	CB	Sebastián Simonet (c)	12 May 1986 (aged 28)	1.90 m	130	394	(France) US Ivry
5	P	Pablo Sebastián Portela	21 June 1980 (aged 34)	1.90 m	129	60	(Argentina) River Plate
6	CB	Diego Simonet	26 December 1989 (aged 25)	1.89 m	74	320	(France) Montpellier
7	RW	Facundo Cangiani	23 April 1991 (aged 23)	1.82 m	20	115	(Argentina) River Plate
8	LB	Pablo Simonet	4 May 1992 (aged 22)	1.89 m	41	75	(France) US Ivry
9	RB	Leonardo Facundo Querín	17 April 1982 (aged 32)	1.97 m	152	230	(France) Billère
10	RB	Federico Matías Vieyra	21 July 1988 (aged 26)	1.92 m	94	203	(France) Istres
12	GK	Fernando Gabriel García	31 August 1981 (aged 33)	1.90 m	186	5	(France) Vernon
13	LB	Juan Pablo Fernández	30 September 1988 (aged 26)	1.90 m	103	154	(Argentina) UNLu
14	LB	Agustín Vidal	8 July 1987 (aged 27)	1.94 m	73	150	(Spain) Maristas
15	P	Gonzalo Carou	15 August 1979 (aged 35)	1.94 m	174	353	(France) Istres
18	LW	Adrián Portela	8 March 1986 (aged 28)	1.83 m	30	104	(Argentina) River Plate
22	P	Sergio Crevatin	28 May 1980 (aged 34)	1.87 m	112	153	(Argentina) SAG LOMAS

=== Denmark ===
A 19-player preliminary squad was announced on 18 December 2014. It was reduced to 17 players on 11 January 2015.

Head coach: (Iceland) Guðmundur Guðmundsson

No.	Pos.	Name	Date of birth (age)	Height	App.	Goals	Club
1	GK	Niklas Landin Jacobsen (c)	19 December 1988 (aged 26)	2.00 m	107	1	(Germany) Rhein-Neckar Löwen
3	RB	Mads Christiansen	3 May 1986 (aged 28)	1.94 m	72	138	(Denmark) Bjerringbro-Silkeborg
5	CB	Mads Mensah Larsen	12 August 1991 (aged 23)	1.88 m	34	77	(Germany) Rhein-Neckar Löwen
6	LW	Casper Ulrich Mortensen	14 December 1989 (aged 25)	1.90 m	36	108	(Denmark) SønderjyskE
7	LW	Anders Eggert	14 May 1982 (aged 32)	1.79 m	127	477	(Germany) Flensburg-Handewitt
11	CB	Rasmus Lauge Schmidt	20 June 1991 (aged 23)	1.93 m	50	70	(Germany) THW Kiel
13	CB	Bo Spellerberg	24 July 1979 (aged 35)	1.92 m	231	327	(Denmark) KIF Kolding København
15	P	Jesper Nøddesbo	23 October 1980 (aged 34)	1.99 m	165	350	(Spain) FC Barcelona
16	GK	Jannick Green	29 September 1989 (aged 25)	1.95 m	45	1	(Germany) SC Magdeburg
17	RW	Lasse Svan Hansen	31 August 1983 (aged 31)	1.84 m	121	233	(Germany) Flensburg-Handewitt
18	RW	Hans Lindberg	1 August 1981 (aged 33)	1.88 m	192	545	(Germany) HSV Hamburg
19	P	Rene Toft Hansen	1 November 1984 (aged 30)	2.00 m	85	143	(Germany) THW Kiel
21	LB	Henrik Møllgaard	2 January 1985 (aged 30)	1.96 m	58	116	(Denmark) Skjern Håndbold
22	RB	Kasper Søndergaard	9 June 1981 (aged 33)	1.92 m	146	330	(Denmark) Skjern Håndbold
23	P	Henrik Toft Hansen	18 December 1986 (aged 28)	2.00 m	45	89	(Germany) HSV Hamburg
24	LB	Mikkel Hansen	22 October 1987 (aged 27)	1.92 m	119	558	(France) Paris Saint-Germain
27	LB	Michael Damgaard	18 March 1990 (aged 24)	1.92 m	4	4	(Denmark) Team Tvis Holstebro

=== Germany ===
A 19-player preliminary squad was announced on 22 December 2014.

Head coach: (Iceland) Dagur Sigurðsson

No.	Pos.	Name	Date of birth (age)	Height	App.	Goals	Club
2	LB	Stefan Kneer	19 December 1985 (aged 29)	1.94 m	59	91	(Germany) Rhein-Neckar Löwen
3	LW	Uwe Gensheimer (c)	26 October 1986 (aged 28)	1.88 m	98	394	(Germany) Rhein-Neckar Löwen
5	RW	Johannes Sellin	31 December 1990 (aged 24)	1.86 m	30	74	(Germany) MT Melsungen
7	P	Patrick Wiencek	22 March 1989 (aged 25)	2.00 m	66	149	(Germany) THW Kiel
12	GK	Silvio Heinevetter	21 October 1984 (aged 30)	1.94 m	118	1	(Germany) Füchse Berlin
13	P	Hendrik Pekeler	2 July 1991 (aged 23)	2.03 m	25	39	(Germany) TBV Lemgo
14	RW	Patrick Groetzki	4 July 1989 (aged 25)	1.89 m	73	195	(Germany) Rhein-Neckar Löwen
16	GK	Carsten Lichtlein	4 November 1980 (aged 34)	2.02 m	187	1	(Germany) VfL Gummersbach
17	RB	Steffen Weinhold	19 July 1986 (aged 28)	1.91 m	62	147	(Germany) THW Kiel
19	CB	Martin Strobel	5 June 1986 (aged 28)	1.89 m	95	112	(Germany) HBW Balingen-Weilstetten
21	P	Erik Schmidt	28 December 1992 (aged 22)	2.04 m	6	2	(Germany) TSG Friesenheim
22	CB	Michael Kraus	28 September 1983 (age 42)	1.87 m	120	392	(Germany) Frisch Auf Göppingen
27	RB	Michael Müller	19 September 1984 (aged 30)	1.97 m	63	131	(Germany) MT Melsungen
30	RB	Jens Schöngarth	7 December 1988 (aged 26)	2.03 m	6	13	(Germany) TuS N-Lübbecke
37	LW	Matthias Musche	18 July 1992 (aged 22)	1.86 m	8	7	(Germany) SC Magdeburg
38	LB	Fabian Böhm	24 June 1989 (aged 25)	1.98 m	4	3	(Germany) HBW Balingen-Weilstetten
42	LB	Paul Drux	7 February 1995 (aged 19)	1.95 m	10	24	(Germany) Füchse Berlin

=== Poland ===
A 23-player preliminary squad was announced on 27 December 2014. On 8 January 2015 it was reduced to 18.

Head coach: (Germany) Michael Biegler

No.	Pos.	Name	Date of birth (age)	Height	App.	Goals	Club
1	GK	Sławomir Szmal	2 October 1978 (aged 36)	1.90 m	248	2	(Poland) Vive Targi Kielce
3	RB	Krzysztof Lijewski	7 July 1983 (aged 31)	1.98 m	147	339	(Poland) Vive Targi Kielce
6	LW	Przemysław Krajewski	20 January 1987 (aged 27)	1.84 m	35	46	(Poland) Azoty-Puławy
7	RW	Robert Orzechowski	20 November 1989 (aged 25)	1.89 m	57	106	(Poland) Górnik Zabrze
8	LB	Karol Bielecki	23 January 1982 (aged 32)	2.02 m	209	782	(Poland) Vive Targi Kielce
9	RB	Andrzej Rojewski	20 August 1985 (aged 29)	1.93 m	2	4	(Germany) SC Magdeburg
11	LW	Adam Wiśniewski	24 October 1980 (aged 34)	1.92 m	110	245	(Poland) Wisła Płock
12	GK	Marcin Wichary	17 February 1980 (aged 34)	1.93 m	112	0	(Poland) Wisła Płock
13	P	Bartosz Jurecki	31 January 1979 (aged 35)	1.93 m	199	638	(Germany) SC Magdeburg
15	LB	Michał Jurecki (c)	27 October 1984 (aged 30)	2.02 m	154	398	(Poland) Vive Targi Kielce
16	GK	Piotr Wyszomirski	6 January 1988 (aged 27)	1.93 m	75	0	(Hungary) MOL-Pick Szeged
18	P	Piotr Grabarczyk	31 October 1982 (aged 32)	2.00 m	76	42	(Poland) Vive Targi Kielce
20	LB	Mariusz Jurkiewicz	3 February 1982 (aged 32)	1.98 m	136	222	(Poland) Wisła Płock
21	CB	Piotr Masłowski	20 February 1988 (aged 26)	1.92 m	12	12	(Poland) Azoty-Puławy
23	P	Kamil Syprzak	23 July 1991 (aged 23)	2.08 m	54	76	(Poland) Wisła Płock
26	RW	Michał Daszek	27 June 1992 (aged 22)	1.80 m	20	24	(Poland) Wisła Płock
45	RB	Michał Szyba	18 March 1988 (aged 26)	1.96 m	26	29	(Slovenia) Gorenje
49	LB	Piotr Chrapkowski	24 March 1988 (aged 26)	2.03 m	36	69	(Poland) Vive Targi Kielce

=== Russia ===
A 21-player preliminary squad was announced on 24 December 2014. It was reduced to 18 on 10 January 2015.

Head coach: Oleg Kuleshov

No.	Pos.	Name	Date of birth (age)	Height	App.	Goals	Club
5	P	Alexander Pyshkin	13 April 1987 (aged 27)	1.97 m	11	4	(Russia) Saint Petersburg
6	RW	Daniil Shishkarev	6 July 1988 (aged 26)	1.89 m	20	23	(North Macedonia) Vardar
7	RW	Dmitry Kovalev	15 May 1982 (aged 32)	1.80 m	132	314	(Russia) Chekhovskiye Medvedi
8	P	Egor Evdokimov	9 March 1982 (aged 32)	2.00 m	91	133	(Ukraine) Motor Zaporizhzhia
9	LW	Oleg Skopintsev	15 April 1984 (aged 30)	1.84 m	47	63	(Ukraine) Motor Zaporizhzhia
11	CB	Pavel Atman	25 May 1987 (aged 27)	1.90 m	50	64	Free agent
12	GK	Vadim Bogdanov	26 March 1986 (aged 28)	1.97 m	24	0	(Poland) Azoty-Puławy
13	LB	Sergei Gorbok	4 December 1982 (aged 32)	1.96 m	11	40	(North Macedonia) Vardar
16	GK	Igor Levshin	18 August 1974 (aged 40)	1.98 m	48	0	(Russia) Permskie Medvedi
18	LB	Sergey Kudinov	29 June 1991 (aged 23)	1.95 m	9	8	(France) C' Chartres MHB
20	P	Mikhail Chipurin	14 July 1986 (aged 28)	1.85 m	105	497	(North Macedonia) Vardar
31	LW	Timur Dibirov	30 July 1983 (aged 31)	1.80 m	125	376	(North Macedonia) Vardar
33	LB	Alexander Dereven	26 March 1992 (aged 22)	1.99 m	1	2	(Russia) Chekhovskiye Medvedi
35	RB	Konstantin Igropulo	14 April 1985 (aged 29)	1.90 m	110	505	(Germany) Füchse Berlin
69	RB	Samvel Aslanyan	23 February 1986 (aged 28)	1.86 m	77	113	(Russia) Permskie Medvedi
84	GK	Oleg Grams	20 February 1984 (aged 30)	2.01 m	109	0	(Russia) Chekhovskiye Medvedi
89	CB	Dmitry Zhitnikov	20 November 1989 (aged 25)	1.85 m	20	25	(Russia) Chekhovskiye Medvedi

=== Saudi Arabia ===
A 21-player preliminary squad was announced on 2 December 2014. On 4 January 2015 the list was trimmed to 17.

Head coach: (Serbia) Goran Dzokic

No.	Pos.	Name	Date of birth (age)	Height	App.	Goals	Club
3	LW	Abdullah Al-Abbas	30 January 1992 (aged 22)	1.68 m	8	20	(Saudi Arabia) Al-Safa
5	P	Hassan Al-Janabi (c)	25 July 1983 (aged 31)	1.80 m	95	115	(Saudi Arabia) Mudhar
7	LW	Abdullah Al-Hulaili	16 June 1994 (aged 20)	1.68 m	0	0	(Saudi Arabia) Mudhar
8	LB	Abdullah Al-Hammad	10 October 1990 (aged 24)	1.85 m	90	80	(Saudi Arabia) Al-Safa
9	CB	Abdulrahman Al-Johani	21 September 1988 (aged 26)	1.84 m	0	0	(Saudi Arabia) Al-Ahli
11	RW	Ahmed Hazazi	13 December 1990 (aged 24)	1.77 m	17	30	(Saudi Arabia) Al-Wehda
15	RW	Ahmad Al-Abdulali	18 June 1988 (aged 26)	1.84 m	0	0	(Saudi Arabia) Mudhar
16	GK	Mohammed Al-Salem	3 April 1986 (aged 28)	1.89 m	100	0	(Saudi Arabia) Al-Safa
17	P	Abdullah Al-Salam	3 April 1995 (aged 19)	1.85 m	0	0	(Saudi Arabia) Mudhar
21	GK	Mohammed Al-Nassfan	26 July 1991 (aged 23)	1.84 m	8	0	(Saudi Arabia) Al-Safa
22	P	Abdullah Al-Salam	3 April 1995 (aged 19)	1.85 m	0	0	(Saudi Arabia) Mudhar
24	LB	Hisham Al-Obaidi	20 March 1988 (aged 26)	1.85 m	92	110	(Saudi Arabia) Al-Safa
34	GK	Ali Al-Saffar	9 February 1995 (aged 19)	1.85 m	9	0	(Saudi Arabia) Mudhar
37	CB	Mohammed Al-Abbas	19 December 1992 (aged 22)	1.65 m	70	85	(Saudi Arabia) Mudhar
57	RB	Mojtaba Al-Salem	15 June 1994 (aged 20)	1.81 m	20	24	(Saudi Arabia) Al-Safa
87	LB	Mohammed Al-Zaer	2 February 1987 (aged 27)	1.84 m	130	180	(Saudi Arabia) Al-Khaleej
88	LB	Hussain Al-Hannabi	26 August 1988 (aged 26)	1.80 m	90	100	(Saudi Arabia) Al-Safa
99	LB	Abbas Al-Saffar	15 January 1994 (aged 21)	1.79 m	0	0	(Saudi Arabia) Mudhar

== Statistics ==
=== Player representation by league system ===
League systems with 10 or more players represented are listed. In all, World Cup squad members play for clubs in 54 different countries, and play in 51 different national leagues.

Country	Players	Outside national squad
Germany	65	49
France	45	33
Spain	24	19
Qatar	22	7
Poland	21	9
(North Macedonia) Macedonia	20	6
Belarus	15	4
Saudi Arabia	15	0
Iran	14	0
Hungary	14	14
Egypt	12	0
Algeria	11	0
Denmark	11	5

The Germany and Saudi Arabia men's national handball team|Saudi Arabian squad is made up entirely of players from the country's domestic league. Slovenia have only one domestic-based player. Of the countries not represented by a national team at the World Cup, Hungarian league provides the most squad members.

=== Player representation by club ===
Clubs with 10 or more players represented are listed.

Club	Players
(Spain) FC Barcelona	12
(Qatar) El Jaish	11
(Belarus) Meshkov Brest	11
(North Macedonia) Vardar	11
(Poland) Vive Targi Kielce	11
(France) Paris Saint-Germain	10
(Germany) THW Kiel	10

=== Coaches representation by country ===
Coaches in bold represent their own country.

Nº	Country	Coaches
4	Iceland	Guðmundur Guðmundsson (Denmark), Patrekur Jóhannesson (Austria), **Aron Kristjánsson**, Dagur Sigurðsson (Germany)
3	Croatia	**Slavko Goluža**, Sead Hasanefendić (Tunisia), Ivica Obrvan (Macedonia)
3	Spain	**Manolo Cadenas**, Jordi Ribera (Brazil), Valero Rivera (Qatar)
2	Slovenia	**Boris Denić**, Borut Maček (Iran)
1	Algeria	**Reda Zeguili**
1	Argentina	**Eduardo Gallardo**
1	Belarus	**Yuri Shevtsov**
1	Bosnia and Herzegovina	**Dragan Marković**
1	Chile	**Fernando Capurro**
1	Czech Republic	**Vladimír Haber**
1	Egypt	**Marwan Ragab**
1	France	**Claude Onesta**
1	Germany	Michael Biegler (Poland)
1	Russia	**Oleg Kuleshov** / **Aleksandr Rymanov**
1	Serbia	Goran Dzokic (Saudi Arabia)
1	Sweden	**Ola Lindgren** / **Staffan Olsson**
