= Al-Johani =

Al-Johani, Al-Juhani or Al-Jehani (Arabic: الجهني) is a surname. Notable people with the surname include:

== Al-Johani ==
- Abdulrahman Al-Johani (born 1988), Saudi Arabian handball player
- Khaled al-Johani (born 1971), teacher of religious instruction in Riyadh, Saudi Arabia
- Raed Al-Johani (born 1987), Saudi football player
- Ziyad Al-Johani (born 2001), Saudi Arabian footballer

== Al-Juhani ==
- Abdullah Awad Al Juhany (born 1976), Saudi Arabian imam
- Khalid al-Juhani (died 2003), Saudi Arabian al-Qaeda member
- Laila al-Juhani (born 1969), Saudi Arabian novelist and short story writer
- Ma'bad al-Juhani (died 699), 7th-century Arab
- Muhammad al-Juhani (disambiguation), multiple people

== See also ==
- Julani (name)
