= Stefan Terzić =

Serbian handballer (born 1994)

Personal information
- Nationality: Serbian
- Born: May 17, 1994 (age 32) Arilje, SFR Yugoslavia
- Height: 1.95 m (6 ft 5 in)

Sport
- Sport: Handball
- Position: Right back
- Current club: Talent Plzeň
- Number: 5

Senior clubs
- Years: Team
- 2010–2012: RK Borac m:tel
- 2012–2013: HSV Hamburg
- 2013–2015: RK Vardar
- 2014: → Zomimak M (loan)
- 2015–2016: Naturhouse La Rioja
- 2016–2019: S.L. Benfica
- 2019: AHC Potaissa Turda
- 2020: Talent M.A.T. Plzeň
- 2020–2021: Ramat Hasharon HC
- 2021–2022: RK Celje
- 2022–: Talent Plzeň
National team
- Years: Team
- 2012–: Serbia
Medal record
Men's Handball

Stefan Terzić (Serbian: Стефан Терзић; born 17 May 1994) is a Serbian handball player who plays for Talent Plzeň and the Serbia national team.

== International honours ==
- EHF Champions League:
  - Winner: 2013
