= Jan Stehlík (handballer) =

Czech handball player

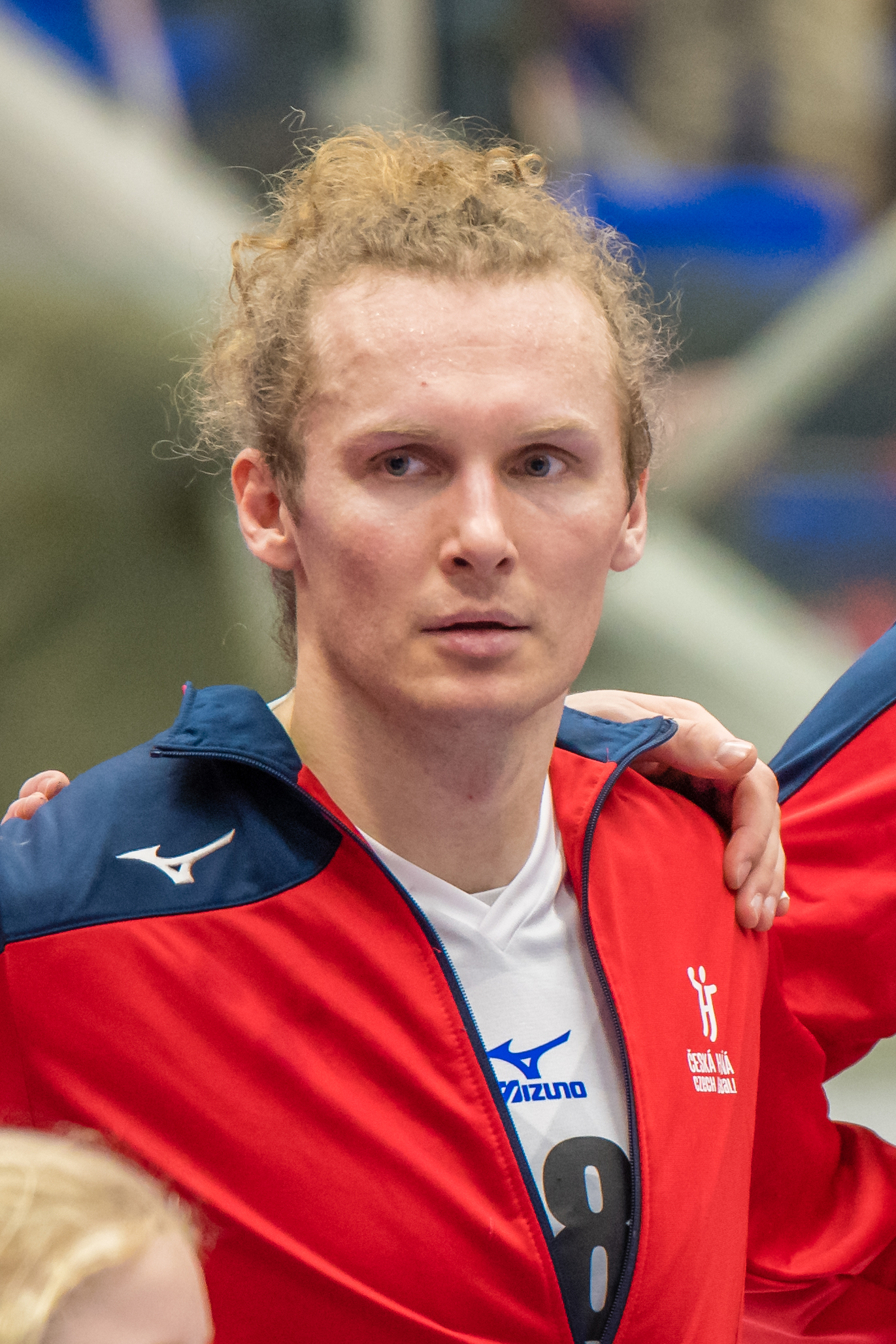

Personal information
- Nationality: Czech
- Born: 18 April 1985 (age 41) Plzeň, Czechoslovakia
- Height: 1.88 m (6 ft 2 in)

Sport
- Sport: Handball
- Position: Right back
- Current club: Talent Plzeň
- Number: 23

Senior clubs
- Years: Team
- –: HC Dukla Prague
- 2009-2017: St-Raphaël VHB
- 2017-: Talent Plzeň
National team
Years	Team	Apps	(Gls)
–	Czech Republic	97	(157)

Jan Stehlík (born 18 April 1985) is a Czech handball player for Talent Plzeň and the Czech national team.
