= Birkir Ívar Guðmundsson =

Icelandic handball player (born 1976)

Personal information
- Full name: Birkir Ívar Guðmundsson
- Nationality: Icelandic
- Born: 14 September 1976 (age 50) Vestmannaeyjar, Iceland
- Height: 193 cm (76 in)

Sport
- Sport: Handball
- Position: Goalkeeper
- Current club: Retired

Senior clubs
- Years: Team
- -1999: ÍBV
- 1999-2000: UMF Stjarnan
- 2000-2006: Haukar Hafnarfjörður
- 2006-2008: TuS N-Lübbecke (Germany)
- 2008-2011: Haukar Hafnarfjörður
National team
Years	Team	Apps	(Gls)
–	Iceland	140	(1)

Birkir Ívar Guðmundsson was a goalkeeper for the Iceland men's national handball team. He is married to Kristín Ólafsdóttir and has two daughters with her. He ended his playing career for Haukar in Iceland. He won the Icelandic championship in 2002, 2003 and 2005.
