= ÍBV (men's handball) =

Icelandic handball club

Íþróttabandalag Vestmannaeyja
- Full name: Íþróttabandalag Vestmannaeyja
- Short name: ÍBV
- Founded: 1903; 123 years ago
- Arena: Íþróttamiðstöð Vestmannaeyja, Vestmannaeyjar
- Capacity: 800
- President: Garðar B. Sigurjónsson
- Head coach: Magnús Stefánsson
- League: Úrvalsdeild karla
- Club colours
Home	Away

The ÍBV men's handball team is the men's handball department of Íþróttabandalag Vestmannaeyja (English: ÍBV sports club), club from Vestmannaeyjar, that plays in the Úrvalsdeild karla. It has won the national championship three times, in 2014, 2018 and 2023. It has won the national cup four times, in 1991, 2015, 2018 and 2020.

Location of ÍBV

== Crest, colours, supporters ==
=== Kits ===
HOME
2016–18	2018–20	2020–22	2022–24

AWAY
2016–18	2020–22	2022–24

== Team ==
=== Current squad ===
Squad for the 2023–24 season

ÍBV

Goalkeepers

- 21 (Belarus) Pavel Miskevich
- 24 (Bosnia and Herzegovina) Petar Jokanović
- 30 (Iceland) Jóhannes Esra Ingólfsson

Left Wingers

- 3 (Iceland) Breki Thor Óðinsson
- 28 (Iceland) Andrés Marel Sigurðsson
- 88 (Iceland) Friðrik Hólm Jónsson

Right Wingers

- 9 (Iceland) Gauti Gunnarsson
- 23 (Iceland) Theodór Sigurbjörnsson

Line Players

- 2 (Iceland) Andri Snaer Andersen
- 22 (Iceland) Hinrik Hugi Heiðarsson
- 25 (Iceland) Ívar Bessi Viðarsson
- 27 (Iceland) Sveinn José Rivera
- 46 (Iceland) Kári Kristján Kristjánsson

Central Backs

- 7 (Iceland) Dagur Arnarsson
- 31 (Iceland) Sigtryggur Daði Rúnarsson
- 64 (Iceland) Elmar Erlingsson

Left Backs

- 10 (Iceland) Ísak Rafnsson
- 20 (Iceland) Arnór Viðarsson

Right Backs

- 18 (Portugal) Daniel Vieira
- 19 (Iceland) Gabríel Martinez Róbertsson
- 26 (Hungary) Dániel Pintér

=== Technical staff ===
- Head coach: (Iceland) Magnús Stefánsson
- Assistant coach: (Iceland) (Georgia (country)) Roland Eradze
- Physiotherapist: (Iceland) Björgvin Eyjolfsson
- Physiotherapist: (Iceland) Georg Ogmundsson
- Physiotherapist: (Iceland) Bjartey Helgadóttir

=== Transfers ===
Transfers for the 2025–26 season

Joining

- (Iceland) Daníel Þór Ingason (LB) from (Germany) HBW Balingen-Weilstetten

Leaving

- (Portugal) Daniel Vieira (RB) to (France) Saran Loiret Handball

=== Transfer History ===
Transfers for the 2023–24 season

Joining

- (Portugal) Daniel Vieira (RB) from (Portugal) Artística de Avanca
- (Hungary) Dániel Pintér (RB) from (Hungary) NEKA
- (Iceland) Sigtryggur Daði Rúnarsson (CB) from (Austria) Alpla HC Hard
- (Iceland) Gauti Gunnarsson (RW) from (Iceland) KA

Leaving

- (Iceland) Rúnar Kárason (RB) to (Iceland) Fram Reykjavík
- (Iceland) Róbert Sigurðarson (LB) to (Norway) Drammen HK
- (Faroe Islands) Dánjal Ragnarsson (LB)

== Previous squads ==
2017–2018 Team
Shirt No	Nationality	Player	Birth Date	Position
4	Iceland	Magnus Stefansson	1 April 1984 (age 42)	Left Back
5	Iceland	Agnar Smári Jónsson	11 October 1993 (age 32)	Right Back
6	Iceland	Bergvin Haraldsson	24 October 1994 (age 31)	Line Player
7	Iceland	Dagur Arnarsson	9 December 1996 (age 29)	Central Back
11	Iceland	Sigurbergur Sveinsson	12 August 1987 (age 39)	Left Back
14	Iceland	Andri Sigfusson	21 June 1998 (age 28)	Goalkeeper
16	Denmark	Stephen Nielsen	2 April 1985 (age 41)	Goalkeeper
17	Iceland	Darri Gylfason	3 February 1998 (age 28)	Left Back
18	Iceland	Fridrik Holm Jonsson	3 December 1998 (age 27)	Left Winger
19	Iceland	Gabríel Martinez Róbertsson	8 August 1999 (age 27)	Right Back
21	Iceland	Elliði Snær Viðarsson	15 November 1998 (age 27)	Line Player
22	Iceland	Andri Heimir Fridriksson	1 October 1989 (age 36)	Left Winger
23	Iceland	Theodór Sigurbjörnsson	21 October 1992 (age 33)	Left Winger
24	Iceland	Agust Gretarsson	30 June 1998 (age 28)	Right Winger
25	Iceland	Róbert Sigurðarson	10 August 1995 (age 31)	Left Back
27	Iceland	Aron Rafn Eðvarðsson	1 September 1989 (age 37)	Goalkeeper
33	Iceland	Pall Eydal Ivarsson	12 August 1997 (age 29)	Line Player
34	Iceland	Róbert Aron Hostert	19 January 1991 (age 35)	Central Back
37	Iceland	Logi Snædal Jónsson	26 January 1998 (age 28)	Left Winger
41	Iceland	Daníel Örn Griffin	12 April 1999 (age 27)	Right Winger
46	Iceland	Kári Kristján Kristjánsson	28 October 1984 (age 41)	Line Player
73	Iceland	Gretar Eythorsson	23 June 1986 (age 40)	Left Winger

== Accomplishments ==
=== Domestic ===
- Úrvalsdeild karla
  - Winner (3) : 2014, 2018, 2023
- Icelandic Men's Handball Cup
  - Winner (4) : 1991, 2015, 2018, 2020

== EHF ranking ==
As of 5/12/2025

Rank	Team	Points
145	(North Macedonia) GRK Tikveš	27
146	(Montenegro) RK Budvanska rivijera	27
147	(Finland) Riihimäki Cocks	27
148	(Iceland) ÍBV	27
149	(Austria) SG Westwien	26
150	(Estonia) Viljandi HC	26
151	(Spain) BM Cuenca	26

== Former club members ==
=== Notable former players ===
- (Iceland) Aron Rafn Eðvarðsson (2017-2018)
- (Iceland) Fannar Þór Friðgeirsson (2018-2021)
- (Iceland) Birkir Ívar Guðmundsson (-1999)
- (Iceland) Björgvin Páll Gústavsson (2005–2006)
- (Iceland) Rúnar Kárason (2021–2023)
- (Iceland) Kári Kristján Kristjánsson (2015-)
- (Iceland) Kristján Örn Kristjánsson (2018-2020)
- (Iceland) Erlingur Richardsson (1990–1992, 1994-1998, 1999-2007)
- (Iceland) Sigtryggur Daði Rúnarsson (2020-2022, 2023-)
- (Iceland) Hákon Daði Styrmisson (2013-2016, 2018-2021)
- (Iceland) Sigurbergur Sveinsson (2016–2021)
- (Iceland) Elliði Snær Viðarsson (2015–2020)
- (Bosnia and Herzegovina) Petar Jokanović (2019-)
- (Lithuania) Robertas Paužuolis (1997-1998)

=== Former coaches ===
Seasons	Coach	Country
2018–2023	Erlingur Richardsson	(Iceland)
2023–	Magnús Stefánsson	(Iceland)
