= Julani (name) =

Julani or Golani and variants is a given name and a surname. As a surname, it comes from Arabic, meaning "of Golan". Notable people with the name include:

== Given name ==
- Julani Archibald (born 1991), Kittitian footballer

== Surname ==
- Abu Mohammad al-Julani, nom de guerre of Ahmed al-Sharaa (born 1982), Syrian President and Military Commander
- Daniel Joulani (born 2003), Israeli footballer

== See also ==
- Al-Johani (name)
