= Elliði Snær Viðarsson =

Icelandic handball player (born 1998)

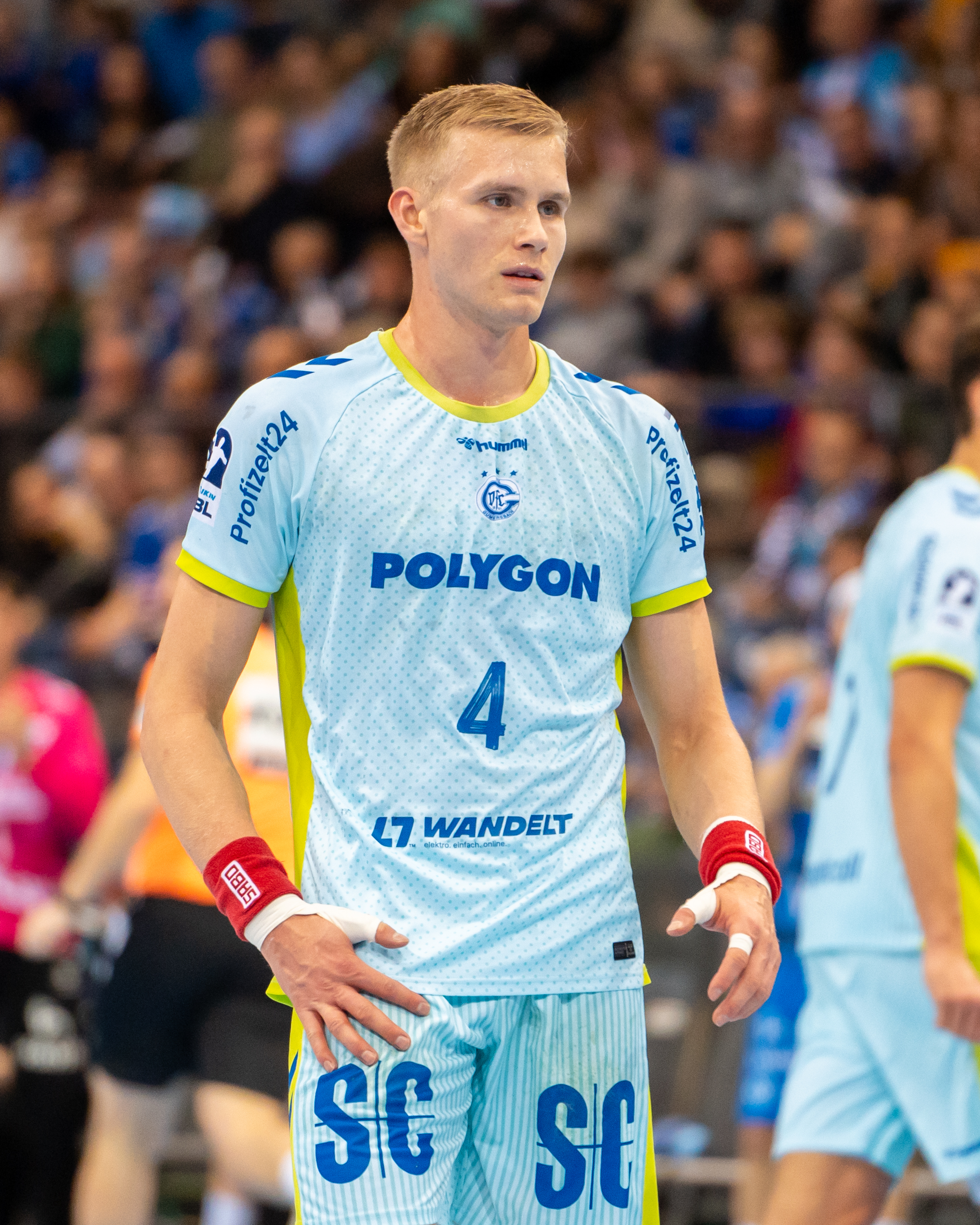

Personal information
- Nationality: Icelandic
- Born: 15 November 1998 (age 27) Vestmannaeyjar, Iceland
- Height: 1.92 m (6 ft 4 in)

Sport
- Sport: Handball
- Position: Pivot
- Current club: VfL Gummersbach
- Number: 4

Senior clubs
- Years: Team
- 2015–2020: ÍBV
- 2020–: VfL Gummersbach
National team
Years	Team	Apps	(Gls)
2020–	Iceland	37	(68)
- Updated on 30. December 2023

Elliði Snær Viðarsson (born 15 November 1998) is an Icelandic handball player for VfL Gummersbach and the Icelandic national team.

He represented Iceland at the 2021 World Men's Handball Championship.

In 2018 he won the Icelandic championship with ÍBV. In 2020 he switched to German club VfL Gummersbach in the 2. Bundesliga. In 2022 he was promoted with the club to the highest tier of German handball.

At the 2026 European Men's Handball Championship he finished 4th with Iceland, losing to Denmark in the semifinal and Croatia in the third-place playoff.
