= Talent Plzeň =

Czech handball club

- Full name: Házená Plzeň s.r.o.
- Founded: 1953; 73 years ago
- Arena: Městská hala Plzeň, Plzeň
- Capacity: 1,350
- President: Pavel Drobil
- Head coach: Petr Štochl
- League: Chance Extraliga
Home	Away

Talent Plzeň is a professional handball club from Plzeň, Czech Republic, that plays in the Chance Extraliga.

Location of Talent Plzeň

== History ==
The club was founded in 1953. Talent Plzeň win the first title in 1974 in Czechoslovak Handball League. The club was doing well in the 1998 and 1999, when won Czech Handball Extraleague.TJ Lokomotiva Plzeň and SSK Talent Plzeň affiliated in 2010. The club has been doing well in recent season, because the club won Czech Handball Extraliga 5 times and 2 times finished at 2nd place.

== Crest, colours, supporters ==
=== Kits ===
HOME
2015–16	2016–17	2017–18	2022–23

AWAY
2014–15	2016–17	2017–18	2022–23

== Management ==
Position	Name
Club Director:	(Czech Republic) Pavel Drobil
Technical Director	(Czech Republic) Josef Kadlec

== Team ==
=== Current squad ===
Squad for the 2022–23 season

Talent Plzeň

Goalkeepers

- 16 (Czech Republic) Filip Herajt
- 31 (Czech Republic) Marek Štefanič
- 61 (Czech Republic) Karel Šmíd

Left Wingers

- 11 (Czech Republic) Ondřej Šafránek
- 21 (Czech Republic) Petr Vinkelhöfer

Right Wingers

- 8 (North Macedonia) Nikola Kosteski
- 27 (Czech Republic) Jan Chmelík

Line Players

- 66 (Czech Republic) Jakub Šindelář
- 77 (Czech Republic) Daniel Režnický

Central Backs

- 3 (Czech Republic) Jakub Douda
- 22 (Czech Republic) Michal Tonar
- 26 (Czech Republic) Martin Říha

Left Backs

- 9 (Czech Republic) Tomáš Nejdl
- 13 (Czech Republic) Milan Škvařil

Right Backs

- 5 (Serbia) Stefan Terzić
- 23 (Czech Republic) Jan Stehlík

=== Technical staff ===
- Head Coach: (Czech Republic) Petr Štochl
- Assistant Coach: (Czech Republic) Jiří Hynek
- Fitness Coach: (Czech Republic) Adolf Blecha
- Masseur: (Czech Republic) Zdeněk Koranda

=== Transfers ===
Transfers for the 2026–27 season

Joining

- (North Macedonia) Andrej Petkovski (GK) from (Poland) KS Azoty-Puławy
- (Serbia) Ognjen Radojičić (LB) from (Greece) AEK Athens
- (Czech Republic) David Poloz (RW) from (Switzerland) GC Amicitia Zürich

Leaving

- (Czech Republic) Dominik Skopár (RW) to (Germany) HC Elbflorenz Dresden
- (Czech Republic) Daniel Bláha (LB) to (Germany) HC Elbflorenz Dresden

=== Transfer History ===
Transfers for the 2022–23 season

Joining

- (Serbia) Stefan Terzić (RB) from (Slovenia) RK Celje
- (North Macedonia) Nikola Kosteski (RW) from (Austria) UHC Hollabrunn

Leaving

- (Czech Republic) Petr Linhart (RW) to (Germany) HC Einheit Plauen
- (Czech Republic) Leonard Kaplan (LB) to (Czech Republic) HBC JVP Strakonice 1921
- (Czech Republic) Richard Křesťan (GK)
- (Czech Republic) Eduard Wildt (RW)
- (Slovakia) Marek Korbel (RB) to (Italy) SSV Brixen Handball

== Previous squads ==
2020–2021 Team
Shirt No	Nationality	Player	Birth Date	Position
1	Czech Republic	Richard Křesťan	20 April 2000 (age 26)	Goalkeeper
3	Czech Republic	Jakub Douda	7 March 1994 (age 32)	Central Back
5	Czech Republic	Šimon Bešta	9 February 2000 (age 26)	Central Back
9	Czech Republic	Tomáš Nejdl	21 June 1997 (age 29)	Left Back
10	Czech Republic	Petr Linhart	29 May 1990 (age 36)	Right Winger
11	Czech Republic	Ondřej Šafránek	7 June 1996 (age 30)	Left Winger
13	Czech Republic	Milan Škvařil	21 August 1992 (age 34)	Left Back
16	Czech Republic	Filip Herajt	22 March 1996 (age 30)	Goalkeeper
18	Slovenia	Tim Jenko Bogdanić	21 February 1994 (age 32)	Right Back
21	Czech Republic	Petr Vinkelhöfer	14 February 1990 (age 36)	Left Winger
22	Czech Republic	Michal Tonar	30 May 1993 (age 33)	Central Back
23	Czech Republic	Jan Stehlík	18 April 1985 (age 41)	Right Back
24	Czech Republic	Leonard Kaplan	16 April 2002 (age 24)	Left Back
25	Czech Republic	Jan Kačin	27 April 1997 (age 29)	Left Winger
26	Czech Republic	Martin Říha	27 September 2000 (age 26)	Central Back
27	Czech Republic	Jan Chmelík	2 December 1997 (age 28)	Right Winger
61	Czech Republic	Karel Šmíd	4 June 1993 (age 33)	Goalkeeper
66	Czech Republic	Jakub Šindelář	20 November 1986 (age 39)	Line Player
77	Czech Republic	Daniel Režnický	26 March 1998 (age 28)	Line Player
95	Czech Republic	Eduard Wildt	11 January 1995 (age 31)	Right Winger

2018–2019 Team
Shirt No	Nationality	Player	Birth Date	Position
1	Czech Republic	Filip Kaiser	24 December 1998 (age 27)	Goalkeeper
3	Czech Republic	Jakub Douda	7 March 1994 (age 32)	Central Back
4	Czech Republic	David Bičiště	27 May 1996 (age 30)	Right Back
9	Czech Republic	Tomáš Nejdl	21 June 1997 (age 29)	Left Back
10	Czech Republic	Petr Sedlák	11 January 2000 (age 26)	Left Winger
11	Czech Republic	Ondřej Šafránek	7 June 1996 (age 30)	Left Winger
15	Croatia	Milan Ivančev	15 March 1986 (age 40)	Central Back
16	Czech Republic	Filip Herajt	22 March 1996 (age 30)	Goalkeeper
19	Czech Republic	Jakub Tonar	23 April 1997 (age 29)	Left Back
21	Czech Republic	Petr Vinkelhöfer	14 February 1990 (age 36)	Left Winger
22	Czech Republic	Michal Tonar	30 May 1993 (age 33)	Central Back
23	Czech Republic	Jan Stehlík	18 April 1985 (age 41)	Right Back
25	Czech Republic	Jan Kačin	27 April 1997 (age 29)	Left Winger
26	Czech Republic	Martin Říha	27 September 2000 (age 26)	Central Back
27	Czech Republic	Jan Chmelík	2 December 1997 (age 28)	Right Winger
29	Czech Republic	Martin Cvikl	8 March 2000 (age 26)	Left Back
61	Czech Republic	Karel Šmíd	4 June 1993 (age 33)	Goalkeeper
66	Czech Republic	Jakub Šindelář	20 November 1986 (age 39)	Line Player
75	Czech Republic	Jakub Šíra	8 December 1988 (age 37)	Line Player
95	Czech Republic	Eduard Wildt	11 January 1995 (age 31)	Right Winger

2014–2015 Team
Shirt No	Nationality	Player	Birth Date	Position
1	Czech Republic	Lukáš Hurt	13 June 1992 (age 34)	Goalkeeper
2	Czech Republic	Leoš Petrovský	5 January 1993 (age 33)	Line Player
3	Czech Republic	Jiří Fořt	28 June 1989 (age 37)	Right Back
4	Czech Republic	David Bičiště	27 May 1996 (age 30)	Right Back
5	Czech Republic	Martin Holík	27 October 1990 (age 36)	Left Winger
6	Czech Republic	Jiří Sedláček	31 January 1989 (age 37)	Central Back
7	Czech Republic	Jiří Jedlička	2 August 1990 (age 36)	Right Back
8	Czech Republic	Tomas Mattas	13 June 1995 (age 31)	Right Winger
9	Czech Republic	Miroslav Skočil	27 October 1990 (age 36)	Left Winger
10	Czech Republic	Petr Linhart	29 May 1990 (age 36)	Right Back
11	Czech Republic	David Voves	2 August 1993 (age 33)	Line Player
12	Czech Republic	Filip Herajt	22 March 1996 (age 30)	Goalkeeper
13	Czech Republic	Milan Škvařil	21 August 1992 (age 34)	Left Back
14	Czech Republic	Jan Blecha	22 April 1993 (age 33)	Left Winger
15	Czech Republic	Adam Strýc	26 September 1992 (age 34)	Left Back
16	Czech Republic	Jan Misař	6 April 1991 (age 35)	Goalkeeper
17	Czech Republic	Jakub Strýc	14 November 1995 (age 30)	Line Player
18	Czech Republic	Lukáš Lesák	18 February 1995 (age 31)	Central Back
21	Czech Republic	Petr Vinkelhöfer	14 February 1990 (age 36)	Left Winger
22	Czech Republic	Michal Tonar	30 May 1993 (age 33)	Central Back
24	Czech Republic	Martin Loskot	10 April 1991 (age 35)	Central Back
25	Czech Republic	Jakub Škvařil	10 September 1986 (age 40)	Right Winger
42	Czech Republic	Lukáš Horký	16 May 1991 (age 35)	Left Back
61	Czech Republic	Karel Šmid	4 June 1993 (age 33)	Goalkeeper
66	Czech Republic	Jakub Šindelář	20 November 1986 (age 39)	Line Player
67	Czech Republic	Martin Kavka	28 December 1989 (age 36)	Central Back
70	Czech Republic	Radek Motlik	24 October 1970 (age 56)	Goalkeeper
95	Czech Republic	Eduard Wildt	11 January 1995 (age 31)	Right Winger

== Accomplishments ==
- Czech Handball Extraliga:
  - Gold: 1998, 1999, 2014, 2015, 2016, 2019, 2021, 2023, 2026
  - Silver: 2017, 2018, 2022, 2024, 2025
  - Bronze: 2000
- Czechoslovakia Handball League:
  - Gold: 1974
  - Silver: 1955, 1956, 1958, 1963, 1970, 1971, 1972, 1976, 1984,
  - Bronze: 1959, 1960, 1961, 1962, 1965, 1966,

== European Records ==
Season	Competition	Round	Club	Home	Away	Aggregate:
1974–75	EHF Champions League	R2	(Norway) Refstad IL Oslo	21–16	20–16	41–32
1974–75	EHF Champions League	Quarterfinals	(Romania) Steua Bucuresti	16–16	7–20	23–36
1984–85	EHF Champions League	R1	(Belgium) Initia Hasselt	16–13	12–14	28–27
1984–85	EHF Champions League	R2	(Socialist Federal Republic of Yugoslavia) and now (Serbia) RK Metaloplastika	26–28	18–36	44–64
1998–99	EHF Champions League	1/16	(North Macedonia) RK Pelister Bitola	30–22	27–30	57–52
1998–99	EHF Champions League	Group D	(Slovenia) Celje Pivovarna Lasko	21–27	22–38	4rd
1998–99	EHF Champions League	Group D	(Spain) Portland San Antonio	26–32	22–28	4rd
1998–99	EHF Champions League	Group D	(Sweden) Redbergslids Göteborg	18–25	20–29	4rd
2014–15	EHF Cup	R1	(Italy) SSV Bozen Loacker	26–26	24–17	50–43
2014–15	EHF Cup	R2	(Russia) Permskie medvedi	23–25	25–30	48–55
2015–16	EHF Cup	R2	(Croatia) RK Porec	27–24	27–25	54–49
2015–16	EHF Cup	R3	(Denmark) Bjerringbro-Silkeborg	28–31	23–35	51–66
2016–17	EHF Cup	R2	(Denmark) KIF Kolding Kobenhavn	20–31	23–38	43–69
2017–18	EHF Cup	R1	(Greece) Olympiacos S.F.P.	21–21	29–18	50–39
2017–18	EHF Cup	R2	(Spain) Helvetia Anaitasuna	23–30	26–40	49–70
2018–19	EHF Cup	R1	(United Kingdom) Glasgow HC	39–12	30–12	69–24
2018–19	EHF Cup	R2	(Romania) HC Dobrogea Sud Constanta	23–29	21–28	44–57
2019–20	EHF Cup	R1	(Iceland) Haukar Handball	26–25	25–20	51–45
2019–20	EHF Cup	R2	(Israel) Hapoel Ashdod	32–23	26–21	58–44
2019–20	EHF Cup	R3	(Denmark) TTH Holstebro	25–30	21–37	46–67
2021–22	EHF European Cup	R3	(Czech Republic) HC Robe Zubří	35–27	28–32	63–59
2021–22	EHF European Cup	L16	(Luxembourg) Handball Esch	29–26	34–30	63–56
2021–22	EHF European Cup	QF	(Sweden) Alingsås HK	25–29	29–29	54–58
2022–23	EHF European Cup	R2	(Latvia) ZRHK Tenax Dobele	29–25	28–31	57–56
2022–23	EHF European Cup	R3	(Israel) AS SGS Ramhat Hashron	28–39	33–34	61–73

== EHF ranking ==
As of 14/12/2022

Rank	Team	Points
73	(Portugal) Águas Santas	84
74	(Finland) Riihimäki Cocks	84
75	(Russia) Dinamo Viktor Stavropol	83
76	(Czech Republic) Talent Plzeň	82
77	(Poland) Górnik Zabrze	78
78	(Kosovo) KH Besa Famgas	77
79	(Serbia) RK Vojvodina	77

== Former club members ==
=== Notable former players ===
- (Czech Republic) Roman Bečvář (2006–2012)
- (Czech Republic) Ladislav Brykner (2010–2011)
- (Czech Republic) Jiří Hynek (1998–2002)
- (Czech Republic) Petr Linhart (2008–2016, 2020–2022)
- (Czech Republic) Alois Mráz (1996–2001)
- (Czech Republic) Karel Nocar (1996–1998, 1999–2001)
- (Czech Republic) Leoš Petrovský (2012–2015)
- (Czech Republic) Martin Šetlík (1987–1992, 1997–1999, 2007–2008)
- (Czech Republic) Jakub Šindelář (2009–)
- (Czech Republic) Jan Stehlík (2017–)
- (Czech Republic) Jan Štochl (1992–2002, 2016–2018)
- (Czech Republic) Petr Štochl (1992–2000, 2001–2002)
- (Czech Republic) Michal Tonar (1985–1988, 1990–1991, 1996–1999)
- (North Macedonia) Nikola Kosteski (2022–)
- (Serbia) Stefan Terzić (2020, 2022–)
