= Nikola Kosteski =

Macedonian handball player

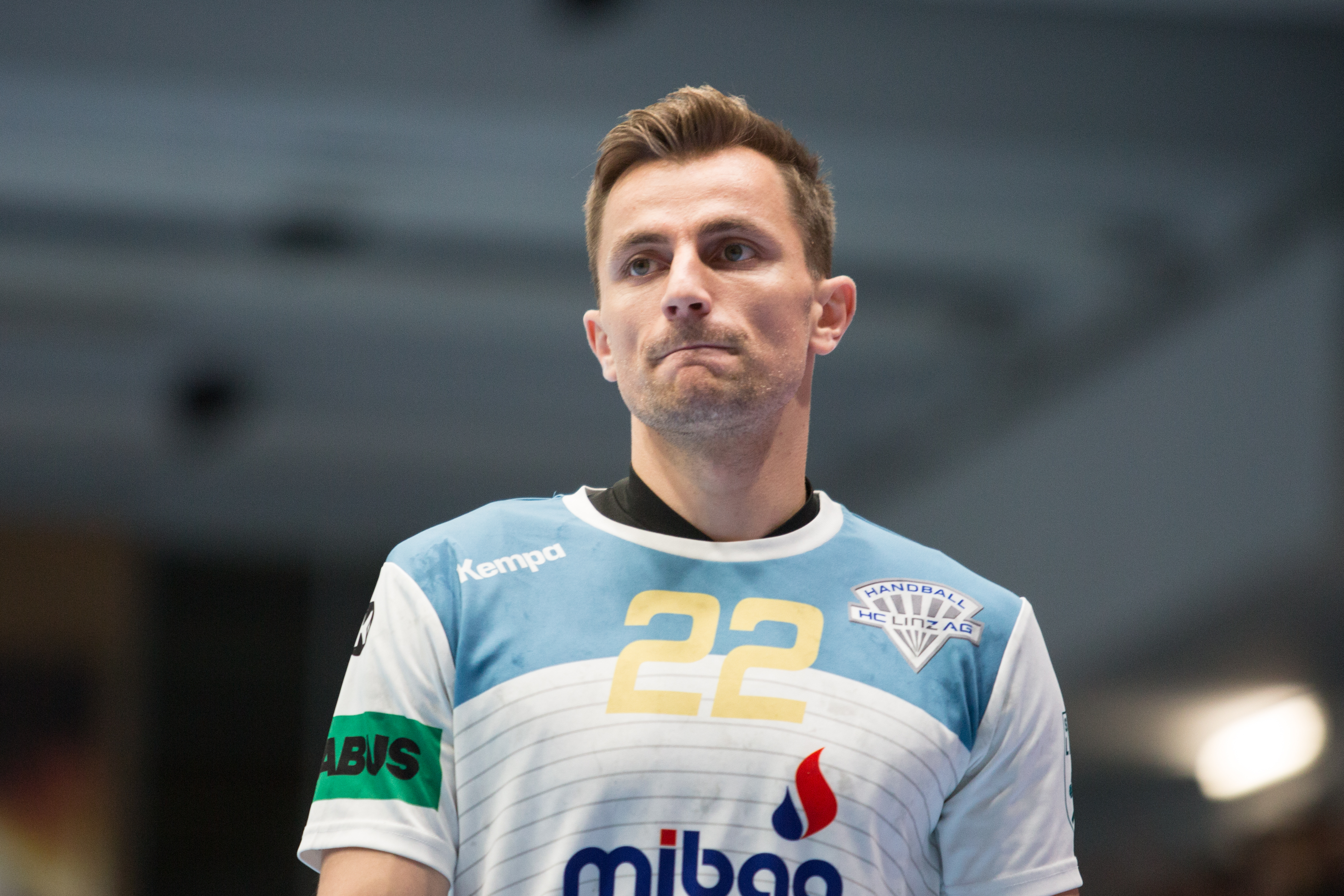

Personal information
- Nationality: Macedonian
- Born: 22 August 1992 (age 34) Struga, Macedonia
- Height: 1.83 m (6 ft 0 in)

Sport
- Sport: Handball
- Position: Right wing
- Current club: Talent Plzeň
- Number: 8

Senior clubs
- Years: Team
- 2011–2012: RK Borec
- 2012–2015: RK Metalurg II
- 2015–2017: RK Metalurg Skopje
- 2017–2018: Selka Eskişehir
- 2019: HT Tatran Prešov
- 2019–2021: HC Linz AG
- 2021–2022: UHC Hollabrunn
- 2022–2024: Talent Plzeň
- 2024–: RK Alkaloid
National team
Years	Team	Apps	(Gls)
2013–	Macedonia	6	(4)

Nikola Kosteski (Macedonian: Никола Костески) (born 22 August 1992) is a Macedonian handball player who plays for Talent Plzeň.

His brother Nenad Kosteski is also a handball player.

== Honours ==
- RK Alkaloid (North Macedonia)
- EHF European Cup

Winner (1): 2024-25
