= Erlingur Richardsson =

Icelandic handball player and coach (born 1972)

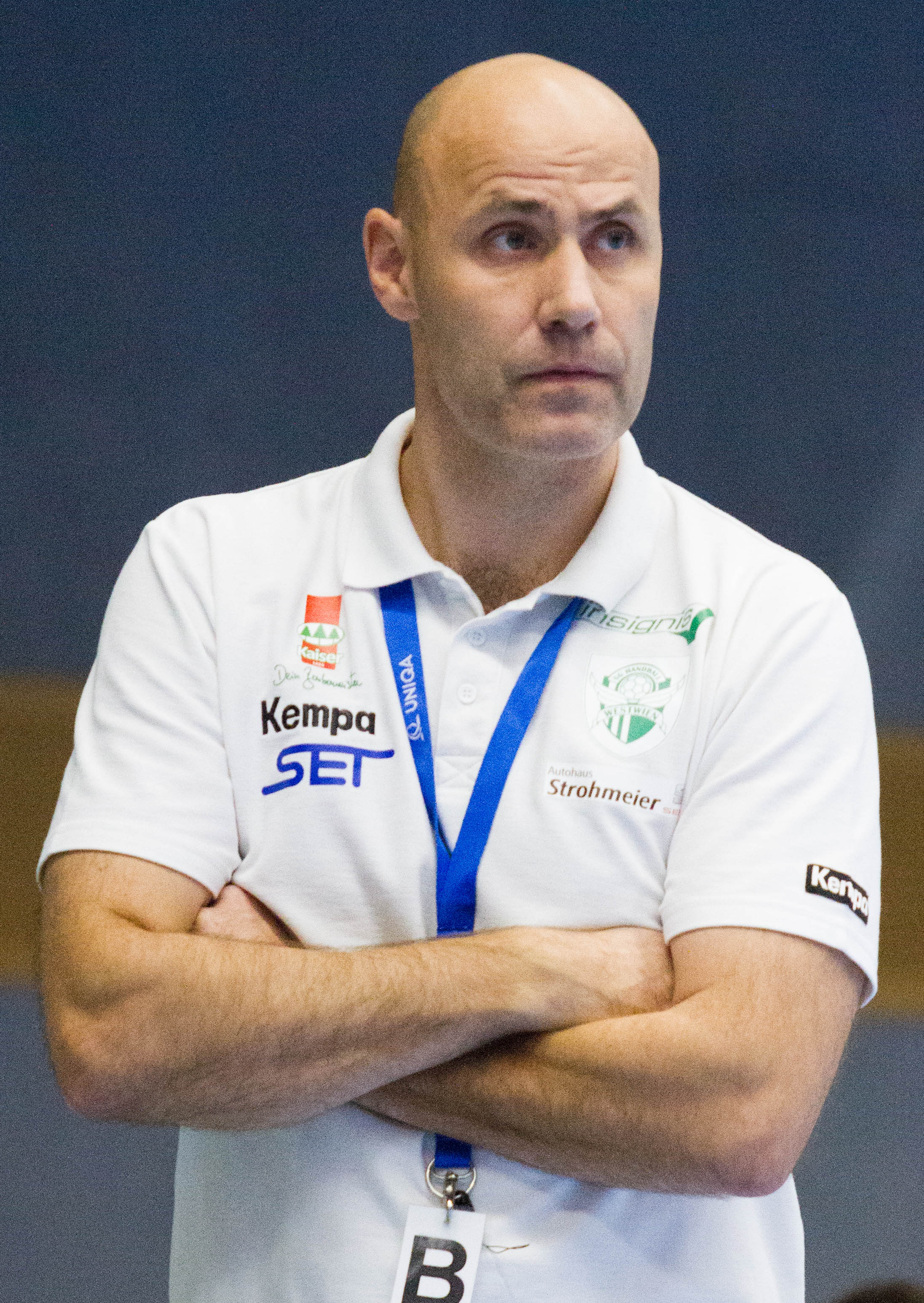

Personal information
- Full name: Erlingur Birgir Richardsson
- Nationality: Icelandic
- Born: 19 September 1972 (age 54) Vestmannaeyjar, Iceland

Sport
- Sport: Handball

Teams managed
- Years: Team
- 1998–1999: Valur (women)
- 2001–2002: ÍBV (women)
- 2002–2005: ÍBV
- 2007–2009: HK Kópavogs (women)
- 2010–2012: HK Kópavogs
- 2012–2013: Iceland
- 2013–2014: SG Handball West Wien
- 2015: Füchse Berlin
- 2017–2022: Netherlands
- 2018–2023: ÍBV
- 2023–2024: Saudi Arabia
- 2025–2026: ÍBV
- 2026–: Minden

Erlingur Birgir Richardsson (born 19 September 1972) is an Icelandic former handball player and currently coach for GWD Minden.

He led the team at the 2020 European Men's Handball Championship in Norway, placing 17th.

He previously coached Iceland men's national handball team and Füchse Berlin, where he won the 2016 IHF Super Globe.

In April 2020, he extended his contract with the Netherlands men's national handball team, to the summer 2022.
