= Petar Jokanović =

Bosnian handball player

Petar Jokanovic
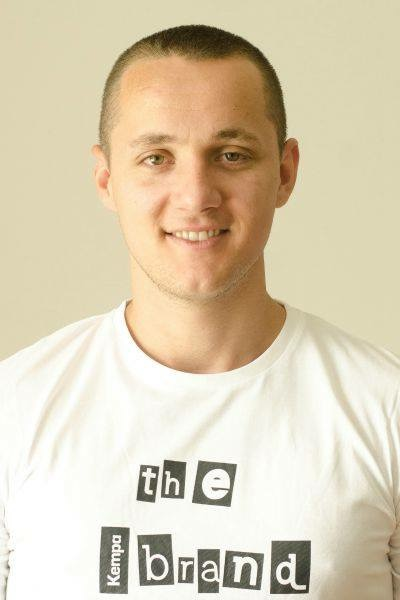

Personal information
- Born: 18 August 1990 (age 36) Travnik, SR Bosnia and Herzegovina
- Height: 1.96 m (6 ft 5 in)

Sport
- Sport: Handball
- Position: Goalkeeper
- Current club: Red Boys Differdange
- Number: 24

Senior clubs
- Years: Team
- 2005–2010: RK Borac Banja Luka
- 2010–2013: RK Leotar
- 2013–2014: RK Bosna Sarajevo
- 2014–2015: RK Borac Banja Luka
- 2015-2017: HC Odorheiu Secuiesc
- 2017–2019: Red Boys Differdange
- 2019–: ÍBV
National team
- Years: Team
- –: Bosnia and Herzegovina

Petar Jokanovic (born 18 August 1990) is a Bosnian handball goalkeeper who plays for Iceland club ÍBV and the Bosnian national team. He started playing handball for local club RK Kotor Varoš in Kotor Varoš, and later played for RK Borac Banja Luka and RK Bosna Sarajevo. He signed for HC Odorheiu Secuiesc in July 2015. After two years in Romania he signed with Red Boys Differdange.

== Honours ==
=== Club ===
- Handball Championship of Bosnia and Herzegovina:
  - Winner: 2014–15,
- Handball Cup of Bosnia and Herzegovina:
  - Winner: 2014–15,
