= Sigurbergur Sveinsson =

Icelandic handball player (born 1987)

Personal information
- Nationality: Icelandic
- Born: 12 August 1987 (age 39) Hafnarfjörður, Iceland
- Height: 1.89 m (6 ft 2 in)

Sport
- Sport: Handball
- Position: Left back
- Current club: ÍBV Vestmannaeyjar
- Number: 11

Senior clubs
- Years: Team
- –2010: Haukar
- 2010–2010: DHC Rheinland
- 2010–2011: TSV Hannover-Burgdorf
- 2011–2012: RTV 1879 Basel
- 2012–2014: Haukar
- 2014–2015: HC Erlangen
- 2015–2016: Team Tvis Holstebro
- 2016–2021: ÍBV
National team
Years	Team	Apps	(Gls)
2007–	Iceland	56	(65)

Sigurbergur Sveinsson (born 12 August 1987) is an Icelandic handball player who currently plays for ÍBV Vestmannaeyjar. He was a member of the Icelandic national team roster for the 2011 World Men's Handball Championship and is again a part of the team for the 2015 World Men's Handball Championship.
