= Goran Džokić =

Serbian handball coach (born 1964)

Goran Džokić (born 18 December 1964) is a Serbian handball coach for the Saudi Arabia national team.
