= Raed Al-Johani =

Saudi football player

Personal information
- Full name: Raed Barakah Al-Marwani Al-Johani
- Date of birth: June 10, 1987 (age 39)
- Place of birth: Saudi Arabia
- Height: 1.78 m (5 ft 10 in)
- Position: Forward

Youth career
- Al-Ansar

Senior career*
Years	Team	Apps	(Gls)
2007–2014	Al-Ansar		
2014	Najran	5	(0)
2014–2015	Al-Riyadh		
2016	Al-Shoalah		
2016–2017	Al-Ansar		
- * Club domestic league appearances and goals

Raed Al-Johani (born 10 June 1987) is a Saudi football player. He is a member of famous Player with the age 34 years old group.
