= Tarek Boukhmis =

Algerian handball player (born 1980)

Personal information
- Nationality: Algerian
- Born: 14 April 1980 (age 46)
- Height: 1.90 m (6 ft 3 in)

Sport
- Sport: Handball
- Position: Left back
- Current club: JSE Skikda
National team
Years	Team	Apps	(Gls)
2010-2015	Algeria	24	(61)

Tarek Boukhmis (born 14 April 1980) is an Algerian handball player for JSE Skikda.

He competed for the Algerian national team at the 2015 World Men's Handball Championship in Qatar, which was his first appearance at the World Championships.
