= Khaled Chentout =

Algerian handball player (born 1984)

Personal information
- Nationality: Algerian
- Born: 29 March 1984 (age 42)
- Height: 1.94 m (6 ft 4 in)

Sport
- Sport: Handball
- Position: Centre back
- Current club: TIF Viking
- Number: 5

Senior clubs
- Years: Team
- 2012-2020: Nøtterøy Handball
National team
Years	Team	Apps	(Gls)
2013-2015	Algeria	12	(19)

Khaled Chentout (born 29 March 1984) is an Algerian handball coach and former handball player, who currently coaches Norwegian TIF Viking. He played 8 years for Norwegian club Nøtterøy Handball.

He competed for the Algerian national team at the 2015 World Men's Handball Championship in Qatar, which was his first appearance at the World Championships.
