= Ahmed Hazazi =

Saudi Arabian handball player (born 1990)

Personal information
- Nationality: Saudi Arabian
- Born: 13 December 1990 (age 35)
- Height: 1.77 m (5 ft 10 in)

Sport
- Sport: Handball
- Position: Right wing
- Current club: Al-Wehda
National team
Years	Team	Apps	(Gls)
–	Saudi Arabia	17	(30)

Ahmed Hazazi (Arabic: أحمد هزازي; born 13 December 1990) is a Saudi Arabian handball player for Al-Wehda and the Saudi Arabian national team.
