= Cristóbal del Río =

Chilean handball player (born 1988)

Cristóbal Del Río
Personal information
- Full name: Cristóbal Felipe del Río Rojas
- Born: 11 March 1988 (age 38) Santiago, Chile
- Height: 1.95 m (6 ft 5 in)

Sport
- Sport: Handball
- Position: Pivot

Senior clubs
- Years: Team
- 2005–2007: Universidad de Chile
- 2007–2009: CB Kutral
- 2009–2015: Santiago Steels
- 2016–2017: Boston TH
- 2019–2022: San Francisco CalHeat
National team
Years	Team	Apps	(Gls)
–	Chile	100	(50)

Cristóbal Felipe del Río Rojas (born 11 March 1988) is a Chilean handball player and a former Chilean national team athlete.

He is the founder and head coach in a Florida fitness company Move It Training, in which he helps his clients reach their fitness goals. He has been in the fitness industry for more than 15 years and helped more than a 1000 clients between Chile, Boston, Miami, and Naples.

Most important international tournaments:

- IHF Superglobe 2021 Jeddah.

- 2 IHF world championships (Spain 2013, Qatar 2015)

- 5 Pan-American tournaments

- 2 South-American Games (Medellin 2010, Chile 2014)

- 1 Pre-Olympic qualification (Croatia 2011)
