= Mirko Mikić =

Bosnian handball player

Personal information
- Born: 23 August 1985 (age 41) Banja Luka, SR Bosnia and Herzegovina
- Height: 1.85 m (6 ft 1 in)

Sport
- Sport: Handball
- Position: Left wing
- Current club: RK Borac Banja Luka
- Number: 14
National team
| Years | Team | Apps | (Gls) |
| – | Bosnia and Herzegovina | 23 | (34) |

Teams managed
- Years: Team
- 2024.: RK Sloboda Tuzla
- Updated on 4.5.2015.

Mirko Mikić (born 23 August 1985) is a Bosnian handball player for RK Borac Banja Luka and the Bosnian national team. He started playing handball for local club RK Kotor Varoš in Kotor Varoš.
