= Reda Zeguili =

Algerian handball coach (born 1963)

Personal information
- Nationality: Algerian
- Born: 7 January 1963 (age 63)

Sport
- Sport: Handball

Senior clubs
- Years: Team
- –1985: Nadit Alger
- 1985–1999: MC Alger
National team
- Years: Team
- –: Algeria

Teams managed
- 1999–2002: GS Pétroliers
- 2002–2003: Sporting Club de Moknine
- 2003–2013: GS Pétroliers
- 2013–2015: Algeria
- 2015–2020: GS Pétroliers
- 2022–2023: Almuheet Club
- 2023: Libya
- 2024–: ES Aïn Touta

Reda Zeguili (born 7 January 1963) is an Algerian handball coach and former player, who coaches the Algierian club ES Aïn Touta. From 2013 to 2015 he was the coach for the Algerian national team. In 2023 he was the head coach of the Libya national team.

In 2024 with the Algerian Super Cup, he won his 100th title when adding both coach and player together.
