= Aron Rafn Eðvarðsson =

Icelandic handball player (born 1989)

Personal information
- Nationality: Icelandic
- Born: 1 September 1989 (age 37) Reykjavík, Iceland
- Height: 2.05 m (6 ft 9 in)

Sport
- Sport: Handball
- Position: Goalkeeper
- Current club: Haukar
- Number: 27

Senior clubs
- Years: Team
- 2008–2013: Haukar Handball
- 2013–2015: Eskilstuna Guif
- 2015–2016: Aalborg Håndbold
- 2016–2017: SG BBM Bietigheim
- 2017–2018: ÍBV
- 2018–2020: Handball Sport Verein Hamburg
- 2020–: SG BBM Bietigheim
National team
Years	Team	Apps	(Gls)
–	Iceland	84	(6)

Aron Rafn Eðvarðsson (born 1 September 1989) is an Icelandic handball player who plays for SG BBM Bietigheim and the Icelandic national team.
