= Abdullah Al-Salam =

Saudi Arabian handball player

Personal information
- Nationality: Saudi Arabian
- Born: 3 April 1995 (age 31)
- Height: 1.85 m (6 ft 1 in)

Sport
- Sport: Handball
- Position: Pivot
- Current club: Mudhar
National team
Years	Team	Apps	(Gls)
–	Saudi Arabia	0	(0)

Abdullah Al-Salam (Arabic: عبد الله آل سلام; born 3 April 1995) is a Saudi Arabian handball player for Mudhar and the Saudi Arabian national team.
