= Jakub Šindelář =

Czech handball player

Personal information
- Nationality: Czech
- Born: 20 November 1986 (age 39) Plzeň, Czechoslovakia
- Height: 1.95 m (6 ft 5 in)

Sport
- Sport: Handball
- Position: Pivot
- Current club: Talent Plzeň
- Number: 66
National team
Years	Team	Apps	(Gls)
–	Czech Republic	17	(6)

Jakub Šindelář (born 20 November 1986) is a Czech handball player for Talent Plzeň and the Czech national team.
