= Kári Kristjánsson =

Icelandic handball player (born 1984)

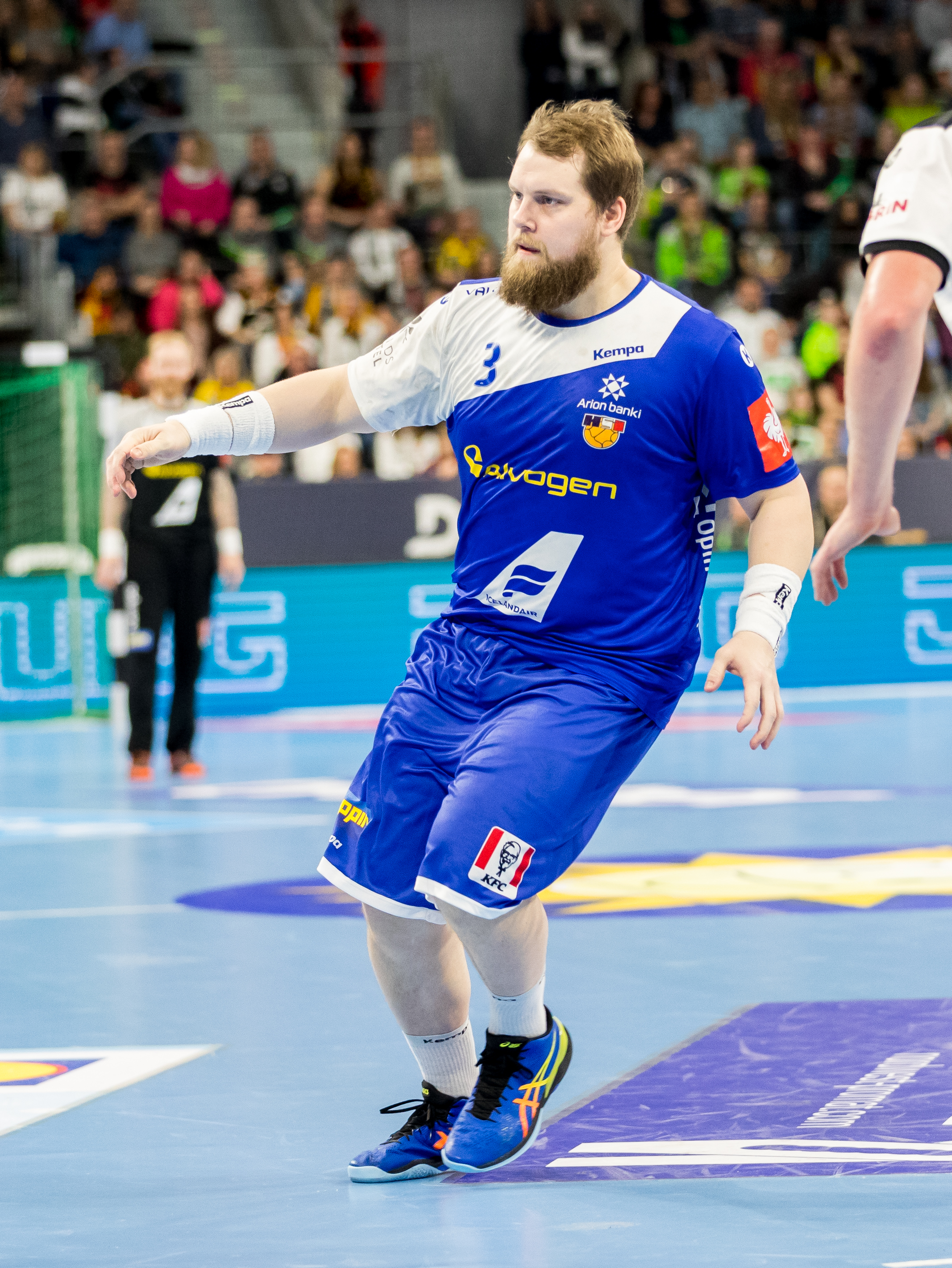

Personal information
- Full name: Kári Kristján Kristjánsson
- Nationality: Icelandic
- Born: 28 October 1984 (age 41) Vestmannaeyjar, Iceland
- Height: 1.92 m (6 ft 4 in)

Sport
- Sport: Handball
- Position: Pivot
- Current club: ÍBV
- Number: 46

Youth career
- Years: Team
- –2005: ÍBV

Senior clubs
- Years: Team
- 2005–2009: Haukar
- 2009–2010: ZMC Amicitia Zürich
- 2010–2013: HSG Wetzlar
- 2013–2014: Bjerringbro-Silkeborg
- 2014–2015: Valur
- 2015–: ÍBV
National team
Years	Team	Apps	(Gls)
2005–	Iceland	145	(178)
- Updated on 2. January 2021

Kári Kristján Kristjánsson (born 28 October 1984) is an Icelandic handball player for ÍBV and the Icelandic national team.

He competed for the Icelandic national team at the 2012 Summer Olympics in London.
