= Dragan Marković (handballer) =

Bosnian handball coach

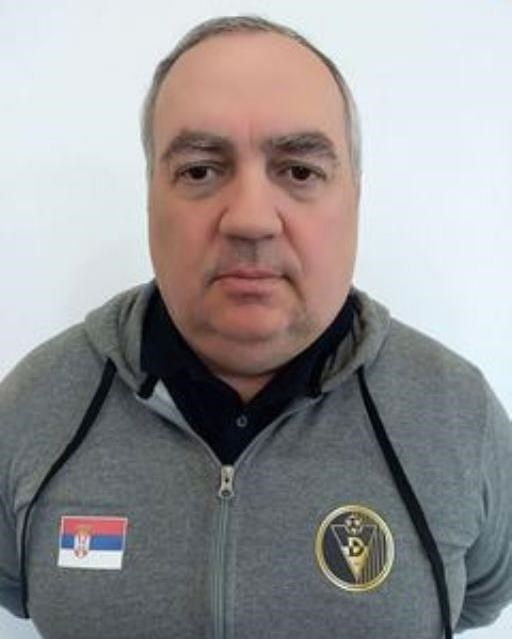

Personal information
- Born: 11 October 1969 (age 57) Banja Luka, SFR Yugoslavia

Sport
- Sport: Handball
- Current club: Dinamo Pancevo (manager)

Senior clubs
- Years: Team
- –: RK Borac Banja Luka
- –: RK Red Star Belgrade
- –: Tus Schutterwald
- –: TV Willstätt

Teams managed
- 2003-2005: TV Willstätt
- 2005-2007: HSG Wetzlar
- 2007-2008: RK Bosna Sarajevo
- 2008-2009: SVH Kassel
- 2009-2012: RK Borac Banja Luka
- 2011-2016: Bosnia and Herzegovina
- 2014-2015: Azoty Pulawy
- 2016: SG Schalksmühle/Halver
- 2016-2017: TV Willstätt
- 2023-2024: HC Dinamo Pancevo
- 2025-2026: Al Sadd SC
- since 07/2026: Club Africain (Tunisia)

Dragan Marković (born October 11, 1969) is a German-Bosnian handball coach and former handball player. He is recognized as an EHF Master Coach and was coach of the national handball team of Bosnia and Herzegovina from 2011 to 2016.

== Personal life ==
Marković was born on October 11, 1969 in Banja Luka, Bosnia and Herzegovina. He is married and has two sons. He has German nationality and currently lives in Wetzlar, Germany.

== Sporting career ==
Marković began his playing career in 1985 at Borac Banja Luka, where he played in Yugoslavia's first league until 1992 and was runner-up. In the 1992/1993 season he played for Red Star Belgrade and also reached the runner-up position. Between 1993 and 1995 he was a player for TuS Schutterwald in the First Bundesliga (BL) in Germany. He then played for TV Willstätt and SG Willstätt/Schutterwald (Regionalliga and 1st BL) from 1995 to 2002.

During the 2000/2001 season Markovic was a player and assistant coach at SG Willstätt/Schutterwald u, and in the following 2001/2002 season he was an assistant coach. From 2003 to 2005 he took on the role of coach at SG Willstätt/Schutterwald in the 2nd Bundesliga (BL). His last club was HC Dinamo Pancevo in Serbia, which competed in the Challenge Cup.

== Honours ==
=== Player ===
International

- IHF Cup Winner 1991 with Borac Banja Luka

Yugoslavia

- Cup Winner 1992 with Borac Banja Luka
- 2nd place 1993 with Red Star Belgrade
- Best U21 Player of Yugoslavia 1988

=== Coach ===
- World Cup 2015 in Qatar with Bosnia and Herzegovina
- 3x 2nd place bosnian championship with RK Borac Banja Luka
- Bosnian cup winner with RK Borac Banja Luka

==== Individual ====
- Olympic team for Yugoslavia 1992
- 41 appearances junior national team
- Bosnian Coach of the Year: 2014
- 78 appearances as Coach of Bosnia and Herzegovina
- Extraordinary results with Bosnia and Herzegovina: BiH: Germany 33:24 BiH: Iceland 33:32 & 29:29 BiH:Denmark 23:25 Denmark:BiH 26:25 BiH:Sweden 27:27 BiH:Portugal 31:29 BiH:Qatar 22:22
