= Laila al-Juhani =

Laila al-Juhani (Arabic: ليلى الجهني; born 1969) is a Saudi Arabian novelist and short story writer. She was born in the northern city of Tubuq. She studied at King Abdul Aziz University in Medina, obtaining a bachelor's degree in English literature. She then went on to receive an MA in Foreign Languages and a PhD in education/psychology, the latter from the University of Tiba in Medina.

Al-Juhani has written a number of short stories and novels. Her debut novel was called Da'iman sayabqa al-hubb (Always Love Will Remain) and was published in the early 1990s. Since then, three further novels have been published: The Barren Paradise (1998), Jahiliyya (Ignorance, 2007), and 40 Fi Ma'ani Ina Akbar (2009). Excerpts from her novels have appeared in English translation in Banipal magazine. The Barren Paradise was also published in a full Italian translation in 2007.

Al-Juhani has won a number of literary prizes in her native country.
