= Leoš Petrovský =

Czech handball player

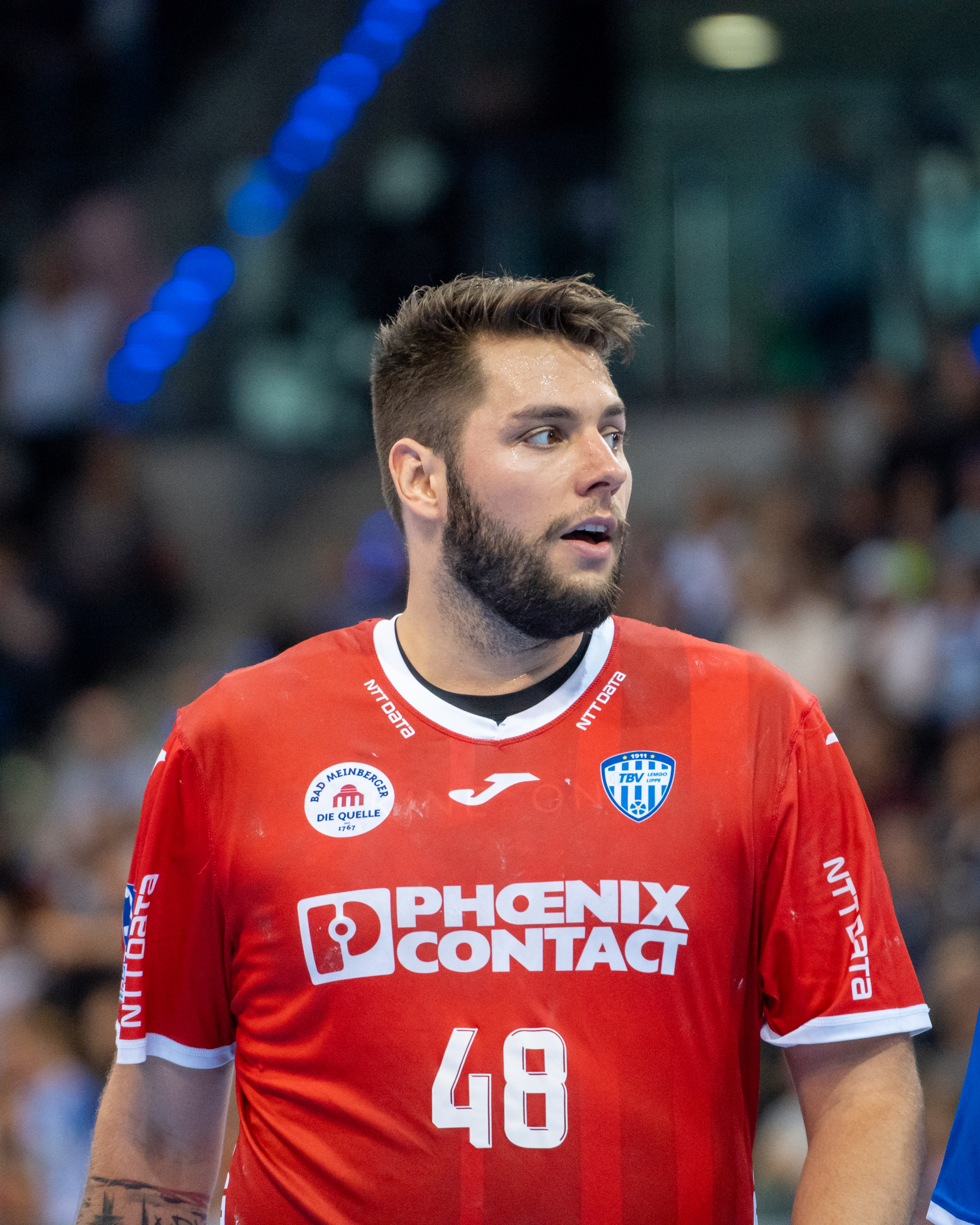

Personal information
- Nationality: Czech
- Born: 5 January 1993 (age 33) Frýdek-Místek, Czech Republic
- Height: 2.02 m (6 ft 8 in)

Sport
- Sport: Handball
- Position: Pivot
- Number: 23

Senior clubs
- Years: Team
- 2012–2015: Talent Plzeň
- 2015–2017: KS Azoty-Puławy
- 2017–2020: Bergischer HC
- 2020–2023: TuS Nettelstedt-Lübbecke
- 2023–: TBV Lemgo
National team
Years	Team	Apps	(Gls)
2014–	Czech Republic	70	(169)

Leoš Petrovský (born 5 January 1993) is a Czech handball player for Bergischer HC and the Czech national team.

He participated at the 2015 World Men's Handball Championship in Qatar.
