= Marwan Ragab =

Egyptian handball coach

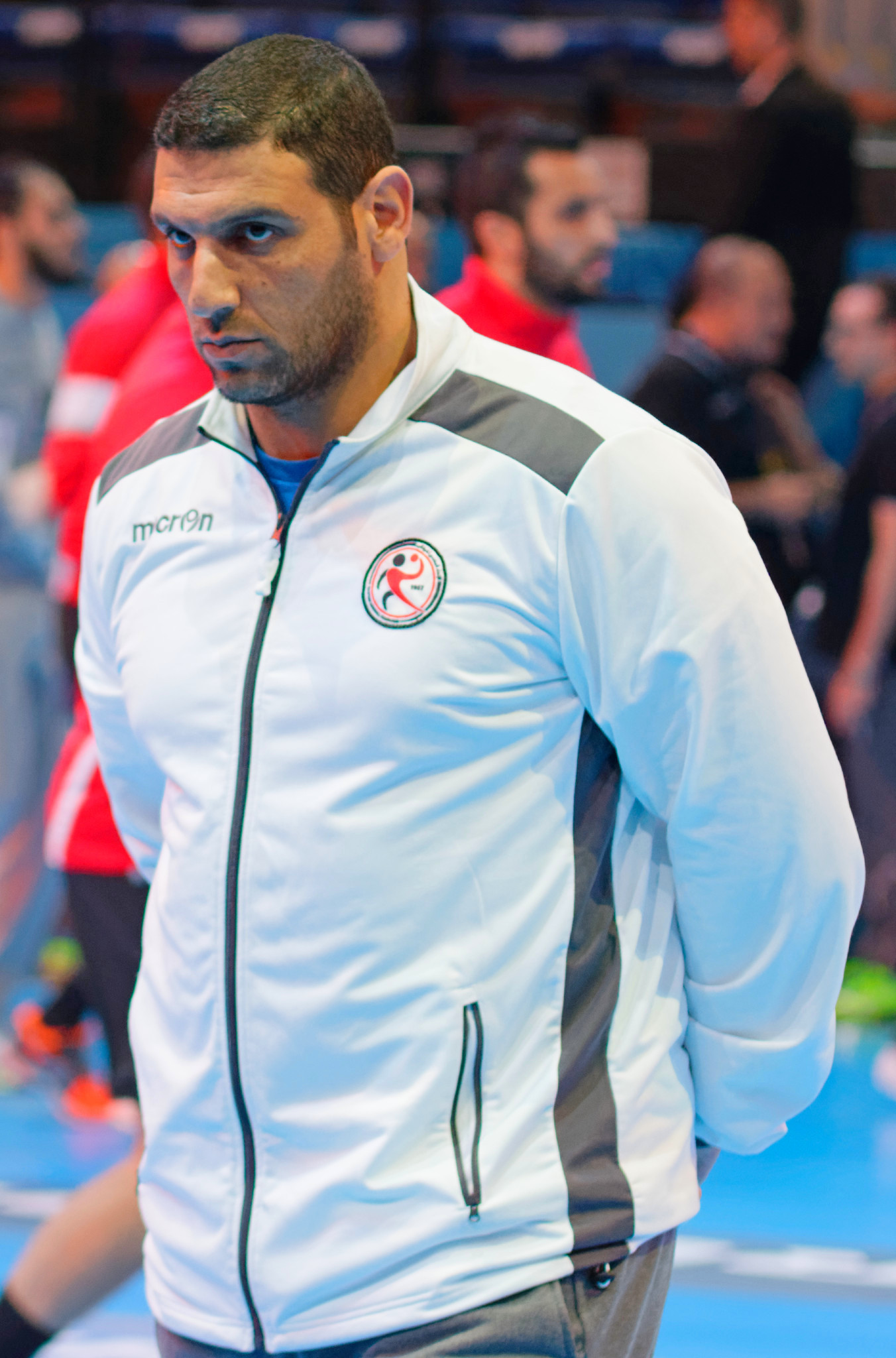
Ragab in January 2017

Marwan Mustafa El-Sayed Ragab (born 3 August 1974) is an Egyptian handballer and coach.

He competed for the Egypt men's national handball team at the 2000 and 2004 Summer Olympics. He also played for Alexandria Sporting Club.

As a coach, he has haded Egyptian national team from 2013 to 2018.
