= Muhammad al-Juhani =

Muhammad al-Juhani may refer to:

- Khalid Ibn Muhammad Al-Juhani (1975–2003), participated in the Riyadh compound bombings
- Muhamad Naji Subhi Al Juhani (born 1967), former Guantanamo captive from Saudi Arabia on the Timeline of the release and transfer of Guantanamo Bay detainees
