= Petr Linhart =

Czech handball player (born 1990)

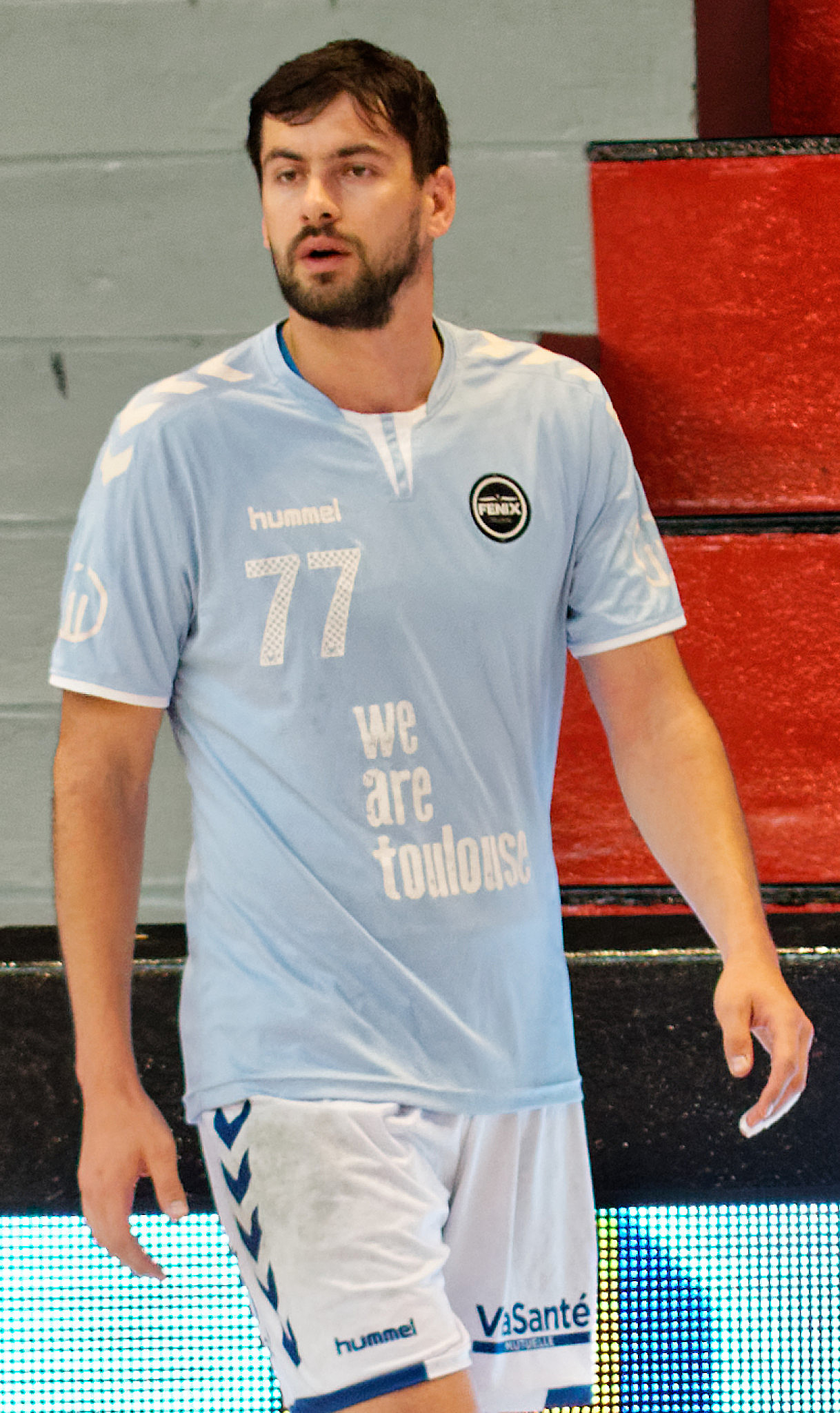

Personal information
- Nationality: Czech
- Born: 29 May 1990 (age 36) Zruč nad Sázavou, Czechoslovakia
- Height: 1.95 m (6 ft 5 in)

Sport
- Sport: Handball
- Position: Right wing
- Current club: Fenix Toulouse Handball
National team
Years	Team	Apps	(Gls)
–	Czech Republic	14	(33)

Petr Linhart (born 29 May 1990) is a Czech handball player. He plays for Fenix Toulouse and the Czech national team. He participated at the 2015 World Men's Handball Championship in Qatar.
