= Abdulrahman Al-Johani =

Saudi Arabian handball player

Personal information
- Nationality: Saudi Arabian
- Born: 21 September 1988 (age 38)
- Height: 1.84 m (6 ft 0 in)

Sport
- Sport: Handball
- Position: Centre back
- Current club: Al-Ahli
National team
Years	Team	Apps	(Gls)
–	Saudi Arabia	0	(0)

Abdulrahman Al-Johani (Arabic: عبد الرحمن الجهني; born 21 September 1988) is a Saudi Arabian handball player for Al-Ahli and the Saudi Arabian national team.
