= 2018 European Men's Handball Championship squads =

This article displays the squads for the 2018 European Men's Handball Championship. Each team consists of up to 28 players, of whom 16 may be fielded for each match.

Age, club, caps and goals as of 12 January 2018.

== Group A ==
=== Croatia ===
A 22-player squad was announced on 31 December 2017. The final squad was revealed on 11 January 2018. Two days later, Domagoj Duvnjak has been replaced by Denis Buntić due to an injury in the match against Serbia. Ivan Pešić replaced Mirko Alilović on 16 January 2018. Two days later, Marino Marić replaced Denis Buntić. Alilović rejoined the squad on 20 January 2018 and replaced Ivan Pešić. Igor Vori and Jakov Gojun were replaced six days later by Tin Kontrec and Halil Jaganjac.

Head coach: Lino Červar

No.	Pos.	Name	Date of birth (age)	Height	App.	Goals	Club
1	GK	Ivan Stevanović	18 May 1982 (aged 35)	1.93 m	50	1	(Switzerland) Kadetten Schaffhausen
2	LW	Lovro Mihić	25 August 1994 (aged 23)	1.80 m	19	30	(Poland) Wisła Płock
3	P	Marino Marić	1 June 1990 (aged 27)	1.96 m	46	96	(Germany) MT Melsungen
5	CB	Domagoj Duvnjak	1 June 1988 (aged 29)	1.97 m	184	602	(Germany) THW Kiel
7	RB	Luka Stepančić	20 November 1990 (aged 27)	2.03 m	55	119	(France) Paris Saint-Germain
8	RB	Marko Kopljar	12 February 1986 (aged 31)	2.10 m	147	305	(Germany) Füchse Berlin
9	P	Igor Vori	20 September 1980 (aged 37)	2.03 m	240	587	(Croatia) RK Zagreb
10	LB	Jakov Gojun	18 April 1986 (aged 31)	2.04 m	161	80	(Germany) Füchse Berlin
12	GK	Ivan Pešić	17 March 1989 (aged 28)	1.93 m	41	1	(Belarus) Meshkov Brest
13	RW	Zlatko Horvat	25 September 1984 (aged 33)	1.79 m	147	436	(Croatia) RK Zagreb
18	CB	Igor Karačić	2 November 1988 (aged 29)	1.89 m	51	126	(North Macedonia) RK Vardar
20	P	Tin Kontrec	9 September 1989 (aged 28)	1.96 m	15	20	(Croatia) RK Zagreb
21	RB	Denis Buntić	13 November 1982 (aged 35)	1.99 m	129	290	(Hungary) MOL-Pick Szeged
23	LB	Stipe Mandalinić	9 September 1992 (aged 25)	1.95 m	31	36	(Germany) Füchse Berlin
25	GK	Mirko Alilović	15 September 1985 (aged 32)	2.00 m	164	0	(Hungary) Telekom Veszprém
26	LW	Manuel Štrlek	1 December 1988 (aged 29)	1.81 m	135	466	(Poland) PGE Vive Kielce
27	RW	Ivan Ćupić	27 March 1986 (aged 31)	1.78 m	137	511	(North Macedonia) RK Vardar
28	P	Željko Musa	8 January 1986 (aged 32)	2.00 m	97	72	(Germany) SC Magdeburg
30	LB	Marko Mamić	6 March 1994 (aged 23)	2.00 m	38	60	(Poland) PGE Vive Kielce
33	CB	Luka Cindrić	5 July 1993 (aged 24)	1.82 m	37	83	(North Macedonia) RK Vardar
45	LB	Halil Jaganjac	22 June 1998 (aged 19)	2.00 m	2	0	(North Macedonia) Metalurg Skopje

=== Iceland ===
The squad was announced on 16 December 2017.

Head coach: Geir Sveinsson

No.	Pos.	Name	Date of birth (age)	Height	App.	Goals	Club
1	GK	Björgvin Páll Gústavsson	24 May 1985 (aged 32)	1.93 m	198	10	(Iceland) Haukar
3	P	Kári Kristjánsson	28 October 1984 (aged 33)	1.92 m	132	151	(Iceland) ÍBV
4	CB	Aron Pálmarsson	19 July 1990 (aged 27)	1.93 m	115	449	(Spain) FC Barcelona
5	RB	Rúnar Kárason	24 May 1988 (aged 29)	1.96 m	88	214	(Germany) TSV Hannover-Burgdorf
6	RB	Ásgeir Örn Hallgrímsson	17 February 1984 (aged 33)	1.94 m	252	420	(France) USAM Nîmes
7	LB	Arnór Atlason	23 July 1984 (aged 33)	1.91 m	200	437	(Denmark) Aalborg Håndbold
8	LW	Bjarki Már Elísson	16 May 1990 (aged 27)	1.91 m	39	85	(Germany) Füchse Berlin
9	LW	Guðjón Valur Sigurðsson	8 August 1979 (aged 38)	1.87 m	343	1798	(Germany) Rhein-Neckar Löwen
11	CB	Ýmir Örn Gíslason	1 July 1997 (aged 20)	1.97 m	9	1	(Iceland) Valur
13	LB	Ólafur Guðmundsson	13 May 1990 (aged 27)	1.94 m	93	153	(Sweden) IFK Kristianstad
14	RB	Ómar Ingi Magnússon	12 March 1997 (aged 20)	1.86 m	21	60	(Denmark) Aarhus Håndbold
17	RW	Arnór Þór Gunnarsson	23 October 1987 (aged 30)	1.79 m	81	191	(Germany) Bergischer HC
20	GK	Ágúst Elí Björgvinsson	11 April 1995 (aged 22)	1.90 m	7	0	(Iceland) FH
21	P	Arnar Freyr Arnarsson	14 March 1996 (aged 21)	2.01 m	24	34	(Sweden) IFK Kristianstad
26	P	Bjarki Már Gunnarsson	10 August 1988 (aged 29)	2.01 m	64	17	(Iceland) Stjarnan
33	CB	Janus Daði Smárason	1 January 1995 (aged 23)	1.84 m	21	33	(Denmark) Aalborg Håndbold

=== Serbia ===
The squad was announced on 11 January 2018. Nikola Crnoglavac replaced Marko Vujin on 16 January 2018 due to an injury. Dobrivoje Marković was replaced by Darko Stevanović six days later. Vanja Ilić was added to the squad on 24 January 2018 to replace Milan Jovanović.

Head coach: Jovica Cvetković

No.	Pos.	Name	Date of birth (age)	Height	App.	Goals	Club
5	LB	Žarko Šešum	16 June 1986 (aged 31)	1.96 m	139	370	(Germany) Frisch Auf Göppingen
7	CB	Stefan Vujić	6 July 1991 (aged 26)	1.92 m	3	6	(Romania) Steaua București
10	RW	Darko Ðukić	11 December 1994 (aged 23)	1.91 m	36	108	(Poland) PGE Vive Kielce
11	P	Bojan Beljanski	22 June 1986 (aged 31)	2.02 m	66	63	(Austria) Bregenz Handball
13	CB	Petar Nenadić	28 June 1986 (aged 31)	1.98 m	78	213	(Germany) Füchse Berlin
14	RW	Bogdan Radivojević	2 March 1993 (aged 24)	1.86 m	24	40	(Germany) Rhein-Neckar Löwen
15	LW	Dobrivoje Marković	22 April 1986 (aged 31)	1.88 m	110	223	(Croatia) RK Zagreb
17	LB	Petar Đorđić	17 September 1990 (aged 27)	1.97 m	16	54	(Belarus) Meshkov Brest
19	LW	Nemanja Ilić	11 May 1990 (aged 27)	1.77 m	58	93	(France) Fenix Toulouse
21	LW	Vanja Ilić	25 February 1993 (aged 24)	1.87 m	4	4	(North Macedonia) Metalurg Skopje
23	RB	Nikola Crnoglavac	22 April 1992 (aged 25)	1.95 m	5	6	(Romania) Dobrogea Sud Constanța
24	LB	Milan Jovanović	24 January 1998 (aged 19)	1.96 m	5	8	(Serbia) RK Vojvodina
25	RB	Nemanja Zelenović	27 February 1990 (aged 27)	1.94 m	56	132	(Germany) SC Magdeburg
33	P	Mijajlo Marsenić	9 March 1993 (aged 24)	2.03 m	65	108	(North Macedonia) RK Vardar
35	LB	Darko Stevanović	3 January 1997 (aged 21)	1.96 m	5	5	(Serbia) RK Partizan
41	RB	Marko Vujin	7 December 1984 (aged 33)	1.99 m	126	489	(Germany) THW Kiel
42	CB	Nemanja Obradović	8 January 1991 (aged 27)	2.00 m	9	9	(Poland) Wisła Płock
76	GK	Vladimir Cupara	19 February 1994 (aged 23)	1.98 m	12	0	(Spain) Ademar León
90	GK	Tibor Ivanišević	16 August 1990 (aged 27)	1.98 m	11	0	(Denmark) Skjern Håndbold

=== Sweden ===
The squad was announced on 21 December 2017. Viktor Östlund replaced Johan Jakobsson on 24 January 2018. Two days later, Albin Lagergren was replaced by Andreas Cederholm.

Head coach: Kristján Andrésson

No.	Pos.	Name	Date of birth (age)	Height	App.	Goals	Club
2	LB	Philip Henningsson	14 June 1995 (aged 22)	1.96 m	6	6	(Sweden) IFK Kristianstad
5	LB	Simon Jeppsson	15 July 1995 (aged 22)	2.03 m	19	44	(Germany) SG Flensburg-Handewitt
7	P	Max Darj	27 September 1991 (aged 26)	1.92 m	25	12	(Germany) Bergischer HC
9	LW	Jerry Tollbring	13 September 1995 (aged 22)	1.82 m	35	116	(Germany) Rhein-Neckar Löwen
10	RW	Niclas Ekberg	23 December 1988 (aged 29)	1.91 m	155	646	(Germany) THW Kiel
12	GK	Andreas Palicka	10 July 1986 (aged 31)	1.89 m	73	1	(Germany) Rhein-Neckar Löwen
15	LW	Hampus Wanne	10 December 1993 (aged 24)	1.85 m	6	10	(Germany) SG Flensburg-Handewitt
18	P	Fredric Pettersson	11 February 1989 (aged 28)	2.01 m	29	38	(France) Fenix Toulouse
19	RB	Johan Jakobsson	12 February 1987 (aged 30)	1.95 m	116	255	(Sweden) IK Sävehof
20	GK	Mikael Appelgren	6 September 1989 (aged 28)	1.91 m	61	1	(Germany) Rhein-Neckar Löwen
23	RB	Albin Lagergren	11 September 1992 (aged 25)	1.86 m	25	62	(Sweden) IFK Kristianstad
24	CB	Jim Gottfridsson	2 September 1992 (aged 25)	1.91 m	52	187	(Germany) SG Flensburg-Handewitt
25	CB	Linus Arnesson	11 May 1990 (aged 27)	1.88 m	6	6	(Germany) Bergischer HC
29	RB	Andreas Cederholm	4 May 1990 (aged 27)	1.86 m	38	66	(Germany) GWD Minden
31	LB	Viktor Östlund	19 January 1992 (aged 25)	1.98 m	38	96	(Denmark) TTH Holstebro
32	RW	Mattias Zachrisson	22 August 1990 (aged 27)	1.78 m	104	222	(Germany) Füchse Berlin
36	P	Jesper Nielsen	30 August 1989 (aged 28)	2.00 m	87	108	(France) Paris Saint-Germain
65	LB	Lukas Nilsson	16 November 1996 (aged 21)	1.94 m	42	106	(Germany) THW Kiel

== Group B ==
=== Austria ===
A 17-player squad was announced on 26 December 2017. On 15 January 2018, Alexander Hermann was replaced by Thomas Kandolf due to an injury.

Head coach: Patrekur Jóhannesson

No.	Pos.	Name	Date of birth (age)	Height	App.	Goals	Club
1	GK	Thomas Bauer	24 January 1986 (aged 31)	1.90 m	132	0	(France) Massy Essonne
2	LB	Alexander Hermann	10 December 1991 (aged 26)	1.92 m	69	107	(Germany) HSG Wetzlar
5	CB	Vytautas Žiūra	11 May 1979 (aged 38)	1.89 m	96	208	(Austria) Fivers Margareten
7	RB	Janko Božović	14 July 1985 (aged 32)	2.04 m	126	311	(Portugal) Sporting CP
20	LW	Sebastian Frimmel	18 December 1995 (aged 22)	1.90 m	31	66	(Austria) SG West Wien
26	RW	Julian Ranftl	17 February 1996 (aged 21)	1.84 m	11	9	(Austria) SG West Wien
28	RW	Robert Weber	25 November 1985 (aged 32)	1.79 m	155	680	(Germany) SC Magdeburg
32	CB	Gerald Zeiner	28 March 1988 (aged 29)	1.91 m	27	56	(Austria) Alpla HC Hard
37	LW	Tobias Schopf	25 December 1985 (aged 32)	1.70 m	18	15	(Austria) UHK Krems
38	P	Wilhelm Jelinek	17 March 1994 (aged 23)	1.91 m	28	31	(Austria) SG West Wien
43	RB	Thomas Kandolf	1 December 1993 (aged 24)	1.83 m	13	14	(Austria) Handball Tirol
53	CB	Nikola Bilyk	28 November 1996 (aged 21)	1.98 m	44	157	(Germany) THW Kiel
55	P	Tobias Wagner	26 March 1995 (aged 22)	1.98 m	23	32	(Germany) HBW Balingen-Weilstetten
56	GK	Kristian Pilipovic	10 December 1994 (aged 23)	1.90 m	14	0	(Croatia) Nexe Našice
85	P	Lukas Herburger	19 December 1994 (aged 23)	1.97 m	5	1	(Austria) Alpla HC Hard
94	LB	Christoph Neuhold	27 April 1994 (aged 23)	1.93 m	28	12	(Germany) ASV Hamm-Westfalen
95	LB	Romas Kirveliavičius	5 March 1988 (aged 29)	2.00 m	30	24	(Germany) HSC 2000 Coburg

=== Belarus ===
The squad was announced on 26 December 2017. On 4 January 2018, 17 players were called up and 18 six days later. Hleb Harbuz was replaced by Mikalai Aliokhin on 22 January 2018.

Head coach: Yuri Shevtsov

No.	Pos.	Name	Date of birth (age)	Height	App.	Goals	Club
3	LB	Uladzislau Kulesh	28 May 1996 (aged 21)	2.00 m	37	107	(Belarus) SKA Minsk
4	P	Maxim Babichev	7 March 1986 (aged 31)	2.00 m	144	238	(Ukraine) Motor Zaporizhzhia
8	RB	Siarhei Shylovich	16 May 1986 (aged 31)	1.95 m	129	413	(Belarus) Meshkov Brest
10	CB	Barys Pukhouski	3 January 1987 (aged 31)	1.84 m	174	758	(Ukraine) Motor Zaporizhzhia
12	GK	Ivan Matskevich	8 May 1991 (aged 26)	1.86 m	57	0	(Belarus) Meshkov Brest
15	RW	Dzianis Rutenka	14 February 1986 (aged 31)	1.86 m	112	283	(Belarus) Meshkov Brest
16	GK	Viachaslau Saldatsenka	23 August 1994 (aged 23)	1.88 m	29	1	(Romania) Odorheiu Secuiesc
18	RB	Artur Karvatski	21 January 1996 (aged 21)	1.96 m	18	51	(Hungary) Balatonfüredi KSE
23	LW	Andrei Yurynok	21 September 1996 (aged 21)	1.98 m	45	118	(Belarus) Meshkov Brest
24	RW	Maksim Baranau	11 April 1988 (aged 29)	1.88 m	123	300	(Romania) Odorheiu Secuiesc
47	CB	Aliaksandr Padshyvalau	8 March 1996 (aged 21)	1.88 m	26	44	(Belarus) SKA Minsk
50	P	Artsem Karalek	20 February 1996 (aged 21)	1.90 m	41	142	(France) Saint-Raphaël
55	LW	Aliaksandr Tsitou	28 October 1986 (aged 31)	1.90 m	163	137	(Finland) Riihimäki Cocks
74	LB	Viachaslau Bokhan	7 April 1996 (aged 21)	2.03 m	9	3	(Belarus) SKA Minsk
90	CB	Hleb Harbuz	17 March 1994 (aged 23)	1.90 m	4	3	(Belarus) SKA Minsk
95	CB	Vadim Gayduchenko	24 April 1995 (aged 22)	1.92 m	23	51	(Romania) Dinamo București
98	RB	Mikalai Aliokhin	9 April 1998 (aged 19)	1.90 m	8	11	(Belarus) SKA Minsk

=== France ===
A 21-player squad was announced on 8 December 2017. It was down to 20, after Olivier Nyokas left the team with an injury on 29 December 2017. The final squad was revealed on 8 January 2018. Romain Lagarde and Luka Karabatić replaced Timothey N'Guessan and Benjamin Afgour on 20 January 2018. Benjamin Afgour and Luka Karabatić rejoined the squad in favour of Timothey N'Guessan and Dika Mem on 28 January 2018.

Head coach: Didier Dinart/Guillaume Gille

No.	Pos.	Name	Date of birth (age)	Height	App.	Goals	Club
1	GK	Cyril Dumoulin	2 February 1984 (aged 33)	2.00 m	65	0	(France) HBC Nantes
5	RB	Nedim Remili	18 July 1995 (aged 22)	1.95 m	33	94	(France) Paris Saint-Germain
7	LB	Romain Lagarde	5 March 1997 (aged 20)	1.94 m	6	2	(France) HBC Nantes
10	RB	Dika Mem	31 August 1997 (aged 20)	1.94 m	16	21	(Spain) FC Barcelona
12	GK	Vincent Gérard	16 December 1986 (aged 31)	1.89 m	61	4	(France) Montpellier Handball
13	CB	Nikola Karabatić	11 April 1984 (aged 33)	1.96 m	289	1149	(France) Paris Saint-Germain
14	LW	Kentin Mahé	22 May 1991 (aged 26)	1.86 m	81	261	(Germany) SG Flensburg-Handewitt
17	LB	Timothey N'Guessan	18 September 1992 (aged 25)	1.96 m	55	97	(Spain) FC Barcelona
19	RW	Luc Abalo	6 September 1984 (aged 33)	1.82 m	232	733	(France) Paris Saint-Germain
20	P	Cédric Sorhaindo	7 June 1984 (aged 33)	1.92 m	191	91	(Spain) FC Barcelona
21	LW	Michaël Guigou	28 January 1982 (aged 35)	1.80 m	250	882	(France) Montpellier Handball
22	P	Luka Karabatić	19 April 1988 (aged 29)	2.02 m	73	2	(France) Paris Saint-Germain
25	P	Benjamin Afgour	1 April 1991 (aged 26)	1.95 m	9	17	(France) Montpellier Handball
26	CB	Nicolas Claire	10 July 1987 (aged 30)	1.90 m	19	22	(France) HBC Nantes
27	RB	Adrien Dipanda	3 May 1988 (aged 29)	2.02 m	42	67	(France) Saint-Raphaël
28	RB	Valentin Porte	7 September 1990 (aged 27)	1.90 m	88	230	(France) Montpellier Handball
30	P	Nicolas Tournat	5 April 1994 (aged 23)	2.00 m	8	7	(France) HBC Nantes
32	LW	Raphaël Caucheteux	9 May 1985 (aged 32)	2.02 m	3	10	(France) Saint-Raphaël

=== Norway ===
An 18-player squad was announced on 19 December 2017. The final squad was revealed on 11 January 2018. On 16 January 2018, Joakim Hykkerud replaced Espen Lie Hansen in the squad. Two days later, Lie Hansen replaced Hykkerud. Espen Christensen was replaced by Kristian Sæverås on 24 January 2018.

Head coach: Christian Berge

No.	Pos.	Name	Date of birth (age)	Height	App.	Goals	Club
5	CB	Sander Sagosen	14 September 1995 (aged 22)	1.95 m	68	258	(France) Paris Saint-Germain
7	P	Joakim Hykkerud	10 February 1986 (aged 31)	1.94 m	78	71	(Norway) Drammen HK
8	P	Bjarte Myrhol	29 May 1982 (aged 35)	1.94 m	211	643	(Denmark) Skjern Håndbold
9	P	Henrik Jakobsen	16 December 1992 (aged 25)	1.96 m	16	15	(Denmark) GOG Håndbold
15	RB	Kent Robin Tønnesen	5 June 1991 (aged 26)	1.96 m	85	204	(Hungary) Telekom Veszprém
16	GK	Espen Christensen	17 June 1985 (aged 32)	1.90 m	75	2	(Germany) GWD Minden
17	LW	Magnus Jøndal	7 February 1988 (aged 29)	1.87 m	111	303	(Denmark) GOG Håndbold
19	RW	Kristian Bjørnsen	10 January 1989 (aged 29)	1.91 m	85	398	(Germany) HSG Wetzlar
21	P	Magnus Gullerud	13 November 1991 (aged 26)	1.96 m	89	98	(Germany) GWD Minden
22	CB	Gøran Sørheim	24 June 1990 (aged 27)	1.83 m	44	38	(Norway) Drammen HK
23	LB	Gøran Johannessen	26 April 1994 (aged 23)	1.94 m	35	57	(Denmark) GOG Håndbold
24	CB	Christian O'Sullivan	22 August 1991 (aged 26)	1.90 m	82	114	(Germany) SC Magdeburg
25	RB	Eivind Tangen	4 May 1993 (aged 24)	1.95 m	56	87	(Denmark) HC Midtjylland
27	RB	Harald Reinkind	17 August 1992 (aged 25)	2.01 m	68	143	(Germany) Rhein-Neckar Löwen
30	GK	Torbjørn Bergerud	16 July 1994 (aged 23)	1.99 m	41	0	(Denmark) Team Tvis Holstebro
77	RB	Magnus Abelvik Rød	7 July 1997 (aged 20)	2.04 m	22	30	(Germany) SG Flensburg-Handewitt
89	LB	Espen Lie Hansen	1 March 1989 (aged 28)	1.96 m	133	422	(Denmark) HC Midtjylland
96	GK	Kristian Sæverås	22 June 1996 (aged 21)	1.99 m	3	0	(Sweden) HK Malmö

== Group C ==
=== Germany ===
A 20-player squad was announced on 15 December 2017. The final squad was revealed on 7 January 2018. On 17 January 2018, Bastian Roscheck was replaced by Finn Lemke. Rune Dahmke replaced Maximilian Janke three days later. Paul Drux was forced to leave due to an injury with Maximilian Janke replacing him on 22 January 2018.

Head coach: Christian Prokop

No.	Pos.	Name	Date of birth (age)	Height	App.	Goals	Club
3	LW	Uwe Gensheimer	26 October 1986 (aged 31)	1.88 m	145	664	(France) Paris Saint-Germain
6	LB	Finn Lemke	30 April 1992 (aged 25)	2.10 m	59	22	(Germany) MT Melsungen
7	P	Patrick Wiencek	22 March 1989 (aged 28)	2.00 m	107	243	(Germany) THW Kiel
9	RW	Tobias Reichmann	27 May 1988 (aged 29)	1.88 m	69	200	(Germany) MT Melsungen
12	GK	Silvio Heinevetter	21 October 1984 (aged 33)	1.94 m	166	2	(Germany) Füchse Berlin
13	P	Hendrik Pekeler	2 July 1991 (aged 26)	2.03 m	71	108	(Germany) Rhein-Neckar Löwen
17	RB	Steffen Weinhold	19 July 1986 (aged 31)	1.91 m	100	252	(Germany) THW Kiel
19	P	Bastian Roscheck	24 February 1991 (aged 26)	1.90 m	2	1	(Germany) SC DHfK Leipzig
20	CB	Philipp Weber	15 September 1992 (aged 25)	1.94 m	11	36	(Germany) SC DHfK Leipzig
23	LB	Steffen Fäth	4 April 1990 (aged 27)	1.95 m	57	118	(Germany) Füchse Berlin
24	RW	Patrick Groetzki	4 July 1989 (aged 28)	1.89 m	117	317	(Germany) Rhein-Neckar Löwen
25	RB	Kai Häfner	10 July 1989 (aged 28)	1.92 m	57	132	(Germany) TSV Hannover-Burgdorf
26	LB	Maximilian Janke	28 February 1993 (aged 24)	1.96 m	2	1	(Germany) SC DHfK Leipzig
33	GK	Andreas Wolff	3 March 1991 (aged 26)	1.98 m	58	8	(Germany) THW Kiel
34	LW	Rune Dahmke	10 April 1993 (aged 24)	1.90 m	32	64	(Germany) THW Kiel
35	LB	Julius Kühn	1 April 1993 (aged 24)	1.98 m	37	124	(Germany) MT Melsungen
48	P	Jannik Kohlbacher	19 July 1995 (aged 22)	1.93 m	37	74	(Germany) HSG Wetzlar
95	CB	Paul Drux	7 February 1995 (aged 22)	1.92 m	58	114	(Germany) Füchse Berlin

=== North Macedonia ===
A 21-player squad was announced on 14 December 2017. It was reduced to 19 on 10 January 2018. Filip Lazarov was injured on 17 January 2018 and replaced by Velko Markoski. Nikola Markoski was replaced after Filip Lazarov rejoined the squad four days later. Goce Ojleski replaced Kiril Lazarov on 24 January 2018.

Head coach: Raúl González

No.	Pos.	Name	Date of birth (age)	Height	App.	Goals	Club
1	GK	Nikola Mitrevski	3 October 1985 (aged 32)	1.88 m	56	0	(Romania) Dobrogea Sud
3	LW	Dejan Manaskov	26 August 1992 (aged 25)	1.80 m	38	117	(Hungary) Telekom Veszprém
4	RB	Martin Velkovski	10 March 1997 (aged 20)	1.91 m	1	0	(North Macedonia) Metalurg Skopje
5	P	Stojanče Stoilov	30 April 1987 (aged 30)	1.92 m	32	51	(North Macedonia) RK Vardar
7	RB	Kiril Lazarov	10 May 1980 (aged 37)	1.93 m	230	1603	(France) HBC Nantes
8	CB	Nemanja Pribak	26 March 1984 (aged 33)	1.90 m	13	17	(Turkey) Beşiktaş
9	LB	Aco Jonovski	29 December 1980 (aged 37)	1.97 m	70	68	(Germany) SG Ratingen
11	LB	Filip Taleski	28 May 1996 (aged 21)	2.00 m	7	8	(Germany) Rhein-Neckar Löwen
13	CB	Filip Mirkulovski	14 September 1983 (aged 34)	1.89 m	126	315	(Germany) HSG Wetzlar
14	LB	Velko Markoski	5 April 1986 (aged 31)	1.94 m	44	8	(Romania) Dobrogea Sud
16	GK	Borko Ristovski	2 November 1982 (aged 35)	1.90 m	118	3	(Spain) FC Barcelona
17	P	Nikola Markoski	22 May 1990 (aged 27)	1.96 m	10	10	(Hungary) Orosházi FKSE
18	CB	Filip Kuzmanovski	3 July 1996 (aged 21)	1.98 m	5	7	(North Macedonia) Metalurg Skopje
22	RW	Goce Georgievski	12 February 1987 (aged 30)	1.85 m	64	170	(Romania) CSM București
23	LB	Filip Lazarov	21 April 1985 (aged 32)	1.97 m	47	133	(Turkey) Beşiktaş
26	LW	Goce Ojleski	10 October 1989 (aged 28)	1.88 m	27	21	(North Macedonia) Eurofarm Rabotnik
28	RW	Martin Popovski	26 August 1994 (aged 23)	1.77 m	4	2	(North Macedonia) RK Vardar
33	P	Žarko Peševski	11 April 1991 (aged 26)	1.95 m	11	17	(North Macedonia) Metalurg Skopje

=== Montenegro ===
A 20-player squad was announced on 22 December 2017. Mile Mijušković was replaced by Nebojša Simić on 15 January 2018. Mirko Radović replaced Žarko Pejović two days later.

Head coach: Dragan Đukić

No.	Pos.	Name	Date of birth (age)	Height	App.	Goals	Club
1	GK	Rade Mijatović	30 June 1981 (aged 36)	1.92 m	54	2	(Belarus) Meshkov Brest
7	RB	Stefan Čavor	3 November 1994 (aged 23)	1.98 m	21	45	(Germany) HSG Wetzlar
8	P	Vuk Lazović	10 March 1988 (aged 29)	1.99 m	4	2	(Romania) Dunărea Călărași
9	CB	Žarko Pejović	25 January 1986 (aged 31)	1.91 m	25	14	(Slovenia) Gorenje Velenje
11	LW	Igor Marković	16 December 1981 (aged 36)	1.83 m	52	116	(Hungary) Komlói Bányász
12	GK	Mile Mijušković	8 October 1985 (aged 32)	1.92 m	16	0	(Spain) BM Benidorm
13	RW	Mirko Radović	15 June 1990 (aged 27)	1.86 m	30	21	(Hungary) Ceglédi KKSE
14	LW	Miloš Vujović	5 July 1993 (aged 24)	1.81 m	27	52	(Hungary) Tatabánya KC
15	RW	Igor Radojevic	25 June 1990 (aged 27)	1.91 m	7	1	(Hungary) Eger-Eszterházy SzSE
16	GK	Nebojša Simić	19 January 1993 (aged 24)	1.94 m	20	0	(Germany) MT Melsungen
18	P	Nebojša Simović	15 November 1993 (aged 24)	1.99 m	4	0	(Hungary) Dabas KC
20	LB	Stevan Vujović	7 April 1990 (aged 27)	1.90 m	25	46	(Romania) Dobrogea Sud
21	LB	Vasko Ševaljević	21 June 1988 (aged 29)	1.93 m	40	188	Tremblay-en-France
24	LB	Miloš Božović	10 December 1994 (aged 23)	1.99 m	12	19	(Hungary) Tatabánya KC
25	RW	Marko Lasica	30 May 1988 (aged 29)	1.88 m	32	31	(Romania) Politehnica Timișoara
32	CB	Božo Anđelić	16 March 1992 (aged 25)	1.86 m	16	17	(North Macedonia) Metalurg Skopje
90	P	Nemanja Grbović	26 April 1990 (aged 27)	1.84 m	39	81	(Hungary) Ceglédi KKSE
93	RB	Vladan Lipovina	7 March 1993 (aged 24)	1.98 m	21	47	(Germany) TV Hüttenberg

=== Slovenia ===
A 21-player squad was announced on 14 December 2017. Nik Henigman was replaced by Gregor Potočnik on 15 January 2018. Patrik Leban and Urh Kastelic replaced Jan Grebenc and Urban Lesjak seven days later.

Head coach: Veselin Vujović

No.	Pos.	Name	Date of birth (age)	Height	App.	Goals	Club
1	GK	Matevž Skok	2 September 1986 (aged 31)	1.88 m	79	2	(Croatia) RK Zagreb
3	P	Blaž Blagotinšek	17 January 1994 (aged 23)	2.02 m	57	70	(Hungary) Telekom Veszprém
4	LW	Matic Verdinek	13 April 1994 (aged 23)	1.88 m	4	8	(Slovenia) Gorenje Velenje
5	LB	Nik Henigman	4 December 1995 (aged 22)	1.99 m	26	38	(Slovenia) RD Ribnica
6	RW	Gašper Marguč	20 August 1990 (aged 27)	1.81 m	89	312	(Hungary) Telekom Veszprém
7	RB	Vid Kavtičnik	24 May 1984 (aged 33)	1.91 m	181	510	(France) Montpellier Handball
8	RW	Blaž Janc	20 November 1996 (aged 21)	1.87 m	33	109	(Poland) PGE Vive Kielce
10	LB	Gregor Potočnik	22 August 1992 (aged 25)	1.96 m	7	7	(Slovenia) Gorenje Velenje
13	LW	Darko Cingesar	25 July 1990 (aged 27)	1.87 m	49	84	(France) Pays d’Aix UC
23	CB	Miha Zarabec	12 October 1991 (aged 26)	1.77 m	36	75	(Germany) THW Kiel
25	CB	Marko Bezjak	26 June 1986 (aged 31)	1.85 m	105	190	(Germany) SC Magdeburg
30	LB	Jan Grebenc	18 August 1992 (aged 25)	1.94 m	11	22	(Slovenia) Gorenje Velenje
33	P	Igor Žabič	15 August 1992 (aged 25)	2.01 m	6	9	(Poland) Wisła Płock
51	LB	Borut Mačkovšek	11 September 1992 (aged 25)	2.03 m	77	161	(Slovenia) RK Celje
55	RB	Žiga Mlakar	16 May 1990 (aged 27)	1.92 m	10	18	(Slovenia) RK Celje
57	CB	Patrik Leban	7 September 1989 (aged 28)	1.87 m	6	10	(Croatia) Nexe Našice
90	GK	Urban Lesjak	24 August 1990 (aged 27)	1.87 m	36	0	(Slovenia) RK Celje
95	P	Matic Suholežnik	2 May 1995 (aged 22)	2.02 m	0	0	(Slovenia) RK Celje
99	GK	Urh Kastelic	27 February 1996 (aged 21)	2.01 m	13	3	(Croatia) RK Zagreb

== Group D ==
=== Czech Republic ===
An 18-player squad was announced on 29 December 2017. The final squad was revealed on 11 January 2018. Peter Šlachta replaced Štěpán Zeman on 21 January 2018. Zeman rejoined the squad three days later to replace Michal Kasal.

Head coach: Jan Filip/Daniel Kubeš

No.	Pos.	Name	Date of birth (age)	Height	App.	Goals	Club
1	GK	Tomáš Mrkva	20 January 1989 (aged 28)	2.03 m	71	0	(Germany) HBW Balingen-Weilstetten
2	LW	Jakub Hrstka	17 March 1990 (aged 27)	1.86 m	82	241	(Slovakia) Tatran Prešov
3	CB	Roman Bečvář	18 April 1989 (aged 28)	1.91 m	90	185	(Germany) HC Elbflorenz
4	LB	Jan Landa	10 May 1986 (aged 31)	1.95 m	46	20	(Czech Republic) HK Lovosice
13	LB	Pavel Horák	28 November 1982 (aged 35)	1.98 m	103	292	(Belarus) Meshkov Brest
15	RW	Milan Kotrč	23 May 1988 (aged 29)	1.89 m	40	52	(Germany) Bergischer HC
16	GK	Martin Galia	12 April 1979 (aged 38)	1.89 m	180	3	(Poland) Górnik Zabrze
17	RB	Stanislav Kašpárek	11 June 1996 (aged 21)	2.02 m	8	0	(Hungary) Balatonfüredi KSE
18	RB	Jan Stehlík	18 April 1985 (aged 32)	1.88 m	90	138	(Czech Republic) Plzeň Handball
22	P	Peter Šlachta	1 January 1993 (aged 25)	1.99 m	21	19	(Hungary) Dabas KC
23	P	Leoš Petrovský	5 January 1993 (aged 25)	2.02 m	49	109	(Germany) Bergischer HC
27	CB	Ondřej Zdráhala	10 July 1983 (aged 34)	1.87 m	99	311	(Switzerland) St. Gallen
31	RW	Tomáš Číp	5 October 1989 (aged 28)	1.87 m	51	113	(Slovakia) Tatran Prešov
39	CB	Jakub Sviták	10 May 1991 (aged 26)	1.80 m	2	2	(Czech Republic) Dukla Prague
40	RB	Dieudonné Mubenzem	22 March 1996 (aged 21)	1.90 m	6	9	(Czech Republic) Dukla Prague
41	LB	Michal Kasal	3 April 1994 (aged 23)	2.09 m	36	23	(Slovakia) Tatran Prešov
66	P	Štěpán Zeman	9 May 1997 (aged 20)	2.02 m	6	7	(Czech Republic) HC Zubří

=== Denmark ===
The squad was announced on 15 December 2017. Peter Balling replaced Anders Zachariassen on 17 January 2018. Zachariassen rejoined the squad and replaced Niclas Kirkeløkke two days later. Niclas Kirkeløkke and Kevin Møller replaced Rene Toft Hansen and Peter Balling on 28 January 2018.

Head coach: Nikolaj Jacobsen

No.	Pos.	Name	Date of birth (age)	Height	App.	Goals	Club
1	GK	Niklas Landin Jacobsen	19 December 1988 (aged 29)	2.01 m	174	6	(Germany) THW Kiel
3	RB	Niclas Kirkeløkke	26 March 1994 (aged 23)	1.95 m	16	25	(Denmark) GOG Håndbold
4	LW	Magnus Landin Jacobsen	20 August 1995 (aged 22)	1.96 m	27	55	(Denmark) KIF Kolding
6	LW	Casper Ulrich Mortensen	14 December 1989 (aged 28)	1.90 m	102	278	(Germany) TSV Hannover-Burgdorf
11	CB	Rasmus Lauge Schmidt	20 June 1991 (aged 26)	1.96 m	90	156	(Germany) SG Flensburg-Handewitt
14	P	Anders Zachariassen	4 September 1991 (aged 26)	1.92 m	12	24	(Germany) SG Flensburg-Handewitt
16	GK	Jannick Green	29 September 1988 (aged 29)	1.95 m	99	2	(Germany) SC Magdeburg
17	RW	Lasse Svan Hansen	31 August 1983 (aged 34)	1.85 m	183	421	(Germany) SG Flensburg-Handewitt
18	RW	Hans Lindberg	1 August 1981 (aged 36)	1.88 m	248	688	(Germany) Füchse Berlin
19	P	Rene Toft Hansen	1 November 1984 (aged 33)	2.00 m	128	193	(Germany) THW Kiel
20	GK	Kevin Møller	20 June 1989 (aged 28)	2.00 m	19	2	(Germany) SG Flensburg-Handewitt
21	LB	Henrik Møllgaard	2 January 1985 (aged 33)	1.96 m	120	160	(France) Paris Saint-Germain
22	CB	Mads Mensah Larsen	12 August 1991 (aged 26)	1.88 m	93	194	(Germany) Rhein-Neckar Löwen
23	P	Henrik Toft Hansen	18 December 1986 (aged 31)	2.00 m	104	192	(Germany) SG Flensburg-Handewitt
24	LB	Mikkel Hansen	22 October 1987 (aged 30)	1.92 m	178	834	(France) Paris Saint-Germain
25	CB	Morten Olsen	11 October 1984 (aged 33)	1.84 m	62	160	(Germany) TSV Hannover-Burgdorf
27	LB	Michael Damgaard	18 March 1990 (aged 27)	1.92 m	61	144	(Germany) SC Magdeburg
42	RB	Peter Balling	5 April 1990 (aged 27)	1.88 m	21	37	(Denmark) TTH Holstebro

=== Hungary ===
An 18-player squad was announced on 30 December 2017. Uroš Vilovski and Iman Jamali were replaced by Dávid Fekete and Ádám Országh on 17 January 2018.

Head coach: Ljubomir Vranjes

No.	Pos.	Name	Date of birth (age)	Height	App.	Goals	Club
3	LW	Dávid Fekete	12 October 1996 (aged 21)	1.80 m	2	1	(Hungary) Budakalász FKC
5	P	Timuzsin Schuch	5 June 1985 (aged 32)	1.97 m	155	76	(Hungary) Telekom Veszprém
6	CB	Ádám Juhász	6 June 1996 (aged 21)	1.83 m	19	56	(Hungary) Tatabánya KC
7	CB	Gábor Császár	16 June 1984 (aged 33)	1.86 m	237	834	(Switzerland) Kadetten Schaffhausen
9	RB	Zsolt Balogh	29 March 1989 (aged 28)	1.89 m	36	72	(Hungary) MOL-Pick Szeged
11	LB	Patrik Ligetvári	13 February 1996 (aged 21)	2.01 m	19	12	(Hungary) Telekom Veszprém
16	GK	Roland Mikler	20 September 1984 (aged 33)	1.90 m	178	0	(Hungary) Telekom Veszprém
17	P	Uroš Vilovski	25 February 1984 (aged 33)	1.97 m	6	13	(Romania) Odorheiu Secuiesc
21	RW	Péter Hornyák	4 October 1995 (aged 22)	1.75 m	14	20	(Hungary) Balatonfüredi KSE
22	LB	Iman Jamali	11 October 1991 (aged 26)	2.00 m	28	70	(Hungary) Telekom Veszprém
23	RW	Ádám Országh	6 October 1989 (aged 28)	1.83 m	2	1	(Hungary) Dabas KC
24	GK	Ádám Borbély	22 June 1995 (aged 22)	1.97 m	8	0	(Poland) Wisła Płock
27	P	Bence Bánhidi	9 February 1995 (aged 22)	2.04 m	43	93	(Hungary) MOL-Pick Szeged
28	P	Szabolcs Szöllősi	28 January 1989 (aged 28)	1.94 m	73	96	(Hungary) Tatabánya KC
32	RB	Donát Bartók	13 July 1996 (aged 21)	1.91 m	2	9	(Germany) TBV Lemgo
33	RB	Gábor Ancsin	27 November 1990 (aged 27)	2.02 m	94	198	(Hungary) Telekom Veszprém
39	LB	Richárd Bodó	13 March 1993 (aged 24)	2.03 m	42	125	(Hungary) MOL-Pick Szeged
66	CB	Máté Lékai	16 June 1988 (aged 29)	1.90 m	113	277	(Hungary) Telekom Veszprém

=== Spain ===
A 19-player squad was announced on 14 December 2017. It was reduced to 17 on 30 December 2017. Aitor Ariño replaced Ángel Fernández Pérez on 15 January 2018. Two days later, Julen Aguinagalde was replaced by Iosu Goñi Leoz. On 21 January 2018, Julen Aguinagalde rejoined the squad instead of Iosu Goñi Leoz. Iosu Goñi Leoz rejoined the squad on 24 January 2018, replacing Daniel Dujshebaev. Gonzalo Pérez de Vargas was replaced by Arpad Šterbik two days later.

Head coach: Jordi Ribera

No.	Pos.	Name	Date of birth (age)	Height	App.	Goals	Club
3	RB	Eduardo Gurbindo	8 November 1987 (aged 30)	1.95 m	100	125	(France) HBC Nantes
6	LW	Ángel Fernández Pérez	16 September 1988 (aged 29)	1.92 m	22	56	(Spain) Ciudad de Logroño
7	LW	Valero Rivera Folch	22 February 1985 (aged 32)	1.85 m	91	364	(Spain) FC Barcelona
9	CB	Raúl Entrerríos	12 February 1981 (aged 36)	1.95 m	227	493	(Spain) FC Barcelona
10	RB	Alex Dujshebaev	17 December 1992 (aged 25)	1.87 m	57	132	(Poland) PGE Vive Kielce
11	CB	Daniel Sarmiento Melián	25 August 1983 (aged 34)	1.88 m	84	186	(France) Saint-Raphaël
13	P	Julen Aguinagalde	8 December 1982 (aged 35)	1.96 m	161	414	(Poland) PGE Vive Kielce
16	GK	Arpad Šterbik	20 November 1979 (aged 38)	1.99 m	75	0	(North Macedonia) RK Vardar
21	LB	Joan Cañellas	30 September 1986 (aged 31)	1.98 m	148	394	(North Macedonia) RK Vardar
24	LB	Viran Morros	15 December 1983 (aged 34)	1.99 m	187	156	(Spain) FC Barcelona
29	LW	Aitor Ariño	5 October 1992 (aged 25)	1.87 m	16	23	(Spain) FC Barcelona
30	P	Gedeón Guardiola	10 January 1984 (aged 34)	2.05 m	107	143	(Germany) Rhein-Neckar Löwen
31	LB	Iosu Goñi Leoz	4 January 1990 (aged 28)	1.95 m	26	44	(France) Pays d'Aix Université Club
33	GK	Gonzalo Pérez de Vargas	10 January 1991 (aged 27)	1.90 m	73	0	(Spain) FC Barcelona
44	GK	Rodrigo Corrales	24 January 1991 (aged 26)	2.02 m	31	1	(France) Paris Saint-Germain
49	RW	Ferrán Solé	25 August 1992 (aged 25)	1.92 m	6	23	(France) Fenix Toulouse
53	RW	David Balaguer	17 August 1991 (aged 26)	1.85 m	16	60	(France) HBC Nantes
55	P	Adrià Figueras	31 August 1988 (aged 29)	1.92 m	16	34	(Spain) BM Granollers
59	CB	Daniel Dujshebaev	4 July 1997 (aged 20)	1.93 m	6	6	(Slovenia) RK Celje
