= HSC 2000 Coburg =

German handball club

- Full name: HSC 2000 Coburg e. V.
- Founded: 2000; 26 years ago
- Arena: HUK-Coburg arena
- Capacity: 3,530
- President: Stefan Apfel
- Head coach: Jan Gorr
- League: 2. Handball-Bundesliga
- 2023–24: 6th
- Club colours
Home	Away

HSC 2000 Coburg is a handball club from Coburg, Germany. Currently, they compete in the 2. Handball-Bundesliga.

The club was founded in 2000 as HSC 2000 Coburg-Neuses when TV Neuses and HSG Coburg merged. In 2019-2020 they won the 2. Handball-Bundesliga and was promoted to the Bundesliga for the first time in club history. They were however relegated again the following season.

== Accomplishments ==
- 2. Handball-Bundesliga: 1
  - Gold: 2020

== Team ==
=== Current squad ===
Squad for the 2022–23 season

Goalkeepers

- 1 (Denmark) Kristian van der Merwe
- 12 (Czech Republic) Jan Kulhánek
- 14 (Germany) Jan Jochens

Left wingers

- 6 (Germany) Max Jaeger
- 7 (Germany) Felix Dettenthaler

Right wingers

- 21 (Germany) Florian Billek
- 23 (Germany) Jannes Krone

Line players

- 9 (Poland) Bartłomiej Bis
- 11 (Switzerland) Viktor Glatthard
- 35 (Germany) Jan Schäffer

Left backs

- 22 (Germany) Fynn Herzig
- 66 (Germany) Felix Jaeger
- 71 (Germany) Andreas Schröder

Centre backs

- 2 (Germany) Max Preller
- 4 (Iceland) Tumi Steinn Rúnarsson
- 18 (Poland) Arkadiusz Ossowski

Right backs

- 13 (Germany) Merlin Fuß
- 25 (Germany) Jakob Knauer

=== Transfers ===
Transfers for the 2026–27 season

Joining

- (Greece) Savvas Savvas (LB) from (Greece) Olympiacos
- (Germany) Sven Wesseling (LB) from (Germany) TuS N-Lübbecke

Leaving

- (Italy) (Sweden) Mikael Helmersson (LB) to (Germany) TuS Ferndorf
- (Latvia) Jānis Pavels Valkovskis (LB) to (Germany) TBV Lemgo
- (Poland) Arkadiusz Ossowski (CB) to (Poland) Stal Mielec
- (Germany) Felix Dettenthaler (LW) to (Germany) SG Regensburg

=== Transfer History ===
Transfers for the 2025–26 season

Joining

- (Croatia) Tin Kontrec (LP) from (Germany) TuS N-Lübbecke
- (Slovenia) Nejc Planinšek (RB) from (Slovenia) RD Ribnica
- (Germany) Lars Düsterhöft (RW) from (Germany) HG Hamburg-Barmbek
- (Denmark) Yaacob Belbey (CB) from (France) JS Cherbourg

Leaving

- (Faroe Islands) Óla Jákup Gaard Olsen (RW) to (Faroe Islands) VÍF
- (Germany) Florian Billek (RW) (retires)
- (Germany) Jan Schäffer (LP) (retires)
- (Germany) Glenn-Louis Eggert (GK) to (Germany) TuS Vinnhorst
- (Germany) Merlin Fuss (RB) to (Germany) HBW Balingen-Weilstetten
- (Germany) Matteo Menges (CB) to (Germany) Eulen Ludwigshafen

Transfers for the 2022–23 season

Joining

- (Denmark) Kristian van der Merwe (GK) from (Denmark) SønderjyskE Håndbold
- (Germany) Max Jaeger (LW) from (Germany) HC Erlangen
- (Germany) Fynn Herzig (LB) from (Germany) VfL Gummersbach
- (Germany) Felix Jaeger (LB) from (Germany) DJK Rimpar Wölfe
- (Poland) Arkadiusz Ossowski (CB) from (Poland) MMTS Kwidzyn
- (Germany) Jannes Krone (RW) from (Germany) TSV Hannover-Burgdorf
- (Poland) Bartłomiej Bis (LP) from (Poland) Górnik Zabrze
- (Switzerland) Viktor Glatthard (LP) from (Germany) TUSEM Essen

Leaving

- (Serbia) Miloš Grozdanić (LW) to (Serbia) RK Vojvodina
- (Estonia) Karl Toom (LB) to (Kuwait) Al-Sulaibikhat SC
- (Lithuania) Lukas Juškėnas (CB) to (Romania) HC Buzău
- (Sweden) Tobias Varvne (CB) to (Sweden) LIF Lindesberg
- (Czech Republic) Dieudonné Mubenzem (RB) to (Germany) EHV Aue
- (Germany) Paul Schikora (RW) to (Germany) TuS Ferndorf
- (Germany) Stefan Bauer (LP) to (Germany) ASV Hamm-Westfalen
- (Germany) Justin Kurch (LP) to (Germany) HC Erlangen

== Coach history ==
- 2000–2002: Ralf Baucke
- 2002: Dieter Schulz
- 2003–2005: Wolfgang Schuhmann
- 2005–2009: Hrvoje Horvat
- 2009: Wolfgang Schuhmann
- December 2009: Georgi Sviridenko
- January 2010: Christian Rose
- February 2010: Raimo Wile
- October 2010: Zdeněk Vaněk
- 2011–2013: Hrvoje Horvat
- 2013–2020: Jan Gorr
- 2020–2021: Alois Mráz
- 2021–2023: Brian Ankersen
- 2023–: Jan Gorr
