= 1993–94 EHF Champions League =

European handball tournament

EHF Champions League
- 1993–94

Tournament information
- Sport: Handball
- Dates: 29 August 1993–30 April 1994
- Administrator: EHF
- Participants: 35

Final positions
- Champions: (Spain) CB Cantabria
- Runner-up: (Portugal) Académico BC Braga

Tournament statistics
- Top scorer: (Slovenia) Uroš Šerbec (76 goals)

The 1993–94 EHF Champions League was the first edition of Europe's premier men handball clubs competition after being rebranded as such. It was won by CB Cantabria (then known as TEKA Santander), who had won the EHF Cup the past season, in a final against Académico BC Braga, who became the first Portuguese team to reach a continental final.

It was the first of eight Champions League trophies in a row won by Spanish clubs, ending the dominance of Eastern European handball.

== Preliminary round ==
| Team 1 | Agg. | Team 2 | 1st leg | 2nd leg |
|---|---|---|---|---|
| RK Pelister Bitola (North Macedonia) | 46–51 | (Slovenia) Celje | 22–23 | 24–28 |
| SKA Minsk (Belarus) | 53–47 | (Estonia) Kehra Tallinn | 33–21 | 20–26 |
| Shevardeni Tbilisi (Georgia (country)) | 32–42 | (Slovakia) HT Tatran Prešov | 12–17 | 20–25 |

== First round ==
| Team 1 | Agg. | Team 2 | 1st leg | 2nd leg |
|---|---|---|---|---|
| Iskra Kielce (Poland) | 62–42 | (Greece) Ionikos Athens | 32–20 | 30–22 |
| SG Wallau-Massenheim (Germany) | 68–24 | (Luxembourg) CHEV Diekirch | 34–10 | 34–14 |
| Redbergslids Gothenburg (Sweden) | 34–38 | (Slovenia) Celje | 23–21 | 11–17 |
| Ankara Spor (Turkey) | 37–38 | (Switzerland) Borba Lucerne | 18–17 | 19–21 |
| Académico BC Braga (Portugal) | 43–27 | (Belgium) Initia Hasselt | 26–13 | 17–14 |
| Neva Saint Petersburg (Russia) | 45–52 | (Israel) Hapoel Rishon LeZion | 25–29 | 20–23 |
| SPE Strovolos Nicosia (Cyprus) | 35–70 | (Hungary) Veszprém SE | 17–33 | 18–37 |
| Horn Sittardia (Netherlands) | 35–59 | (Spain) TEKA Santander | 15–32 | 20–27 |
| Tatra Kopřivnice (Czech Republic) | 41–45 | (Iceland) Valur | 23–23 | 18–22 |
| KIF Kolding (Denmark) | 48–56 | (Norway) Sandefjord TIF | 25–25 | 23–31 |
| Drumso Dicken Espoo (Finland) | 50–32 | (Faroe Islands) Vestmanna IF | 28–16 | 22–17 |
| Badel 1862 Zagreb (Croatia) | 48–41 | (Lithuania) Granitas Kaunas | 27–19 | 21–22 |
| SKA Minsk (Belarus) | 55–45 | (Bulgaria) Belasitsa Petrich | 32–16 | 23–29 |
| USAM Nîmes (France) | 40–31 | (Slovakia) HT Tatran Prešov | 22–16 | 18–15 |
| Principe Trieste (Italy) | 34–36 | (Austria) UHK West Wien | 21–17 | 13–18 |
| Medveščak Zagreb (Croatia) | 53–45 | (Ukraine) ZTR Zaporizhzhia | 28–19 | 25–26 |

== Eight finals ==
| Team 1 | Agg. | Team 2 | 1st leg | 2nd leg |
|---|---|---|---|---|
| Iskra Kielce (Poland) | 48–66 | (Germany) SG Wallau-Massenheim | 23–34 | 25–32 |
| Celje (Slovenia) | 51–30 | (Switzerland) Borba Lucerne | 27–11 | 24–19 |
| Académico BC Braga (Portugal) | 58–51 | (Israel) Hapoel Rishon LeZion | 28–22 | 30–31 |
| Veszprém SE (Hungary) | 42–48 | (Spain) TEKA Santander | 26–23 | 16–25 |
| Valur (Iceland) | 46–46 (a) | (Norway) Sandefjord TIF | 25–22 | 21–24 |
| Drumso Dicken Espoo (Finland) | 53–66 | (Croatia) Badel 1862 Zagreb | 26–24 | 27–42 |
| SKA Minsk (Belarus) | 37–57 | (France) USAM Nîmes | 15–31 | 22–26 |
| UHK West Wien (Austria) | 39–38 | (Croatia) Medveščak Zagreb | 23–20 | 16–18 |

== Group stage ==
=== Group A ===
| Team | Pld | W | D | L | GF | GA | GD | Pts |
|---|---|---|---|---|---|---|---|---|
| (Portugal) Académico BC Braga | 6 | 3 | 2 | 1 | 139 | 135 | +4 | 8 |
| (France) USAM Nîmes | 6 | 2 | 3 | 1 | 142 | 135 | +7 | 7 |
| (Norway) Sandefjord TIF | 6 | 3 | 1 | 2 | 146 | 145 | +1 | 7 |
| (Croatia) Badel 1862 Zagreb | 6 | 0 | 2 | 4 | 135 | 147 | −12 | 2 |

Matchday One
| USAM Nîmes | 25–22 | Badel 1862 Zagreb |
| Sandefjord TIF | 28–18 | Académico Braga |
Matchday Two
| Badel 1862 Zagreb | 29–29 | Sandefjord TIF |
| Académico Braga | 26–26 | USAM Nîmes |
Matchday Three
| USAM Nîmes | 26–20 | Sandefjord TIF |
| Académico Braga | 24–19 | Badel 1862 Zagreb |
Matchday Four
| USAM Nîmes | 22–22 | Académico Braga |
| Sandefjord TIF | 25–24 | Badel 1862 Zagreb |
Matchday Five
| Académico Braga | 28–22 | Sandefjord TIF |
| Badel 1862 Zagreb | 23–23 | USAM Nîmes |
Matchday Six
| Badel 1862 Zagreb | 18–21 | Académico Braga |
| Sandefjord TIF | 22–20 | USAM Nîmes |

=== Group B ===
| Team | Pld | W | D | L | GF | GA | GD | Pts |
|---|---|---|---|---|---|---|---|---|
| (Spain) TEKA Santander | 6 | 4 | 0 | 2 | 136 | 136 | 0 | 8 |
| (Austria) UHK West Wien | 6 | 3 | 0 | 3 | 116 | 121 | −5 | 6 |
| (Germany) SG Wallau-Massenheim | 6 | 3 | 0 | 3 | 128 | 127 | +1 | 6 |
| (Slovenia) Celje | 6 | 2 | 0 | 4 | 120 | 116 | +4 | 4 |

Matchday One
| Celje | 19–21 | TEKA Santander |
| UHK West Wien | 20–19 | SG W-Massenheim |
Matchday Two
| TEKA Santander | 21–17 | UHK West Wien |
| SG W. Massenheim | 23–18 | Celje |
Matchday Three
| SG W. Massenheim | 30–23 | TEKA Santander |
| Celje | 24–18 | UHK West Wien |
Matchday Four
| UHK West Wien | 28–23 | TEKA Santander |
| Celje | 23–16 | SG W. Massenheim |
Matchday Five
| SG W. Massenheim | 17–15 | UHK West Wien |
| TEKA Santander | 20–19 | Celje |
Matchday Six
| UHK West Wien | 18–17 | Celje |
| TEKA Santander | 28–23 | SG W. Massenheim |

== Final ==
| Team 1 | Agg. | Team 2 | 1st leg | 2nd leg |
|---|---|---|---|---|
| Académico BC Braga (Portugal) | 43–45 | (Spain) CB Cantabria | 22–22 | 21–23 |

EHF Champions League
1993–94 winners

First title
