= Jiří Motl =

Czech handball player

Personal information
- Nationality: Czech
- Born: 29 September 1984 (age 42) Litoměřice, Czechoslovakia
- Height: 1.84 m (6 ft 0 in)

Sport
- Sport: Handball
- Position: Left wing
- Current club: HK Lovosice
- Number: 8
National team
Years	Team	Apps	(Gls)
–	Czech Republic	74	(142)

Jiří Motl (born 29 September 1984) is a Czech handball player. He plays for HK Lovosice and the Czech national team. He participated at the 2015 World Men's Handball Championship in Qatar.
