= Zdeněk Vaněk =

Czech handball player

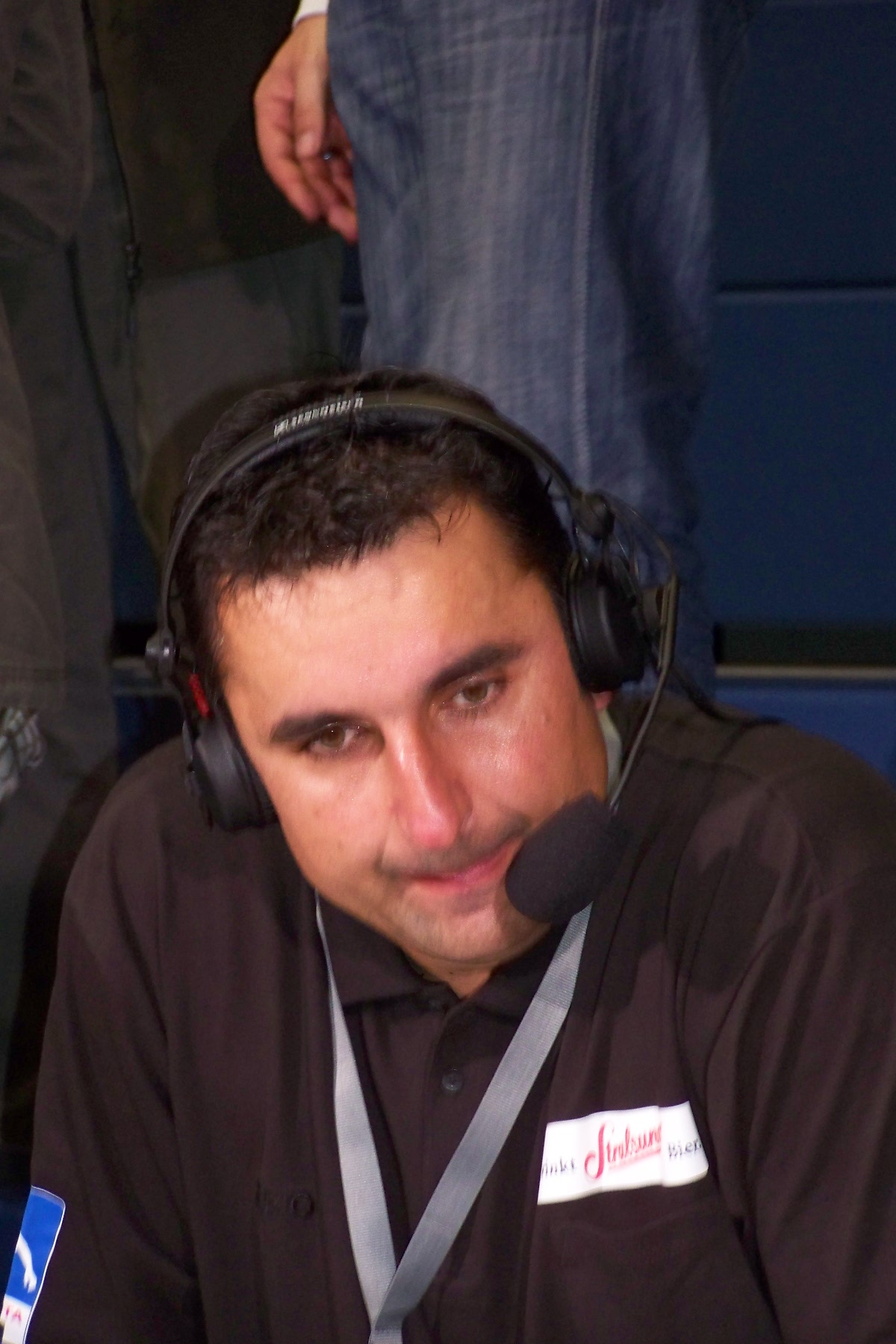
Zdeněk Vaněk (2008)

Zdeněk Vaněk (born 19 July 1968 in Jaroměř) is a Czech former handball player and coach who competed in the 1988 Summer Olympics and in the 1992 Summer Olympics.

In the 2010-2011 season he was the head coach of German club HSC 2000 Coburg.
