= Constantin Möstl =

Austrian handball player (born 2000)

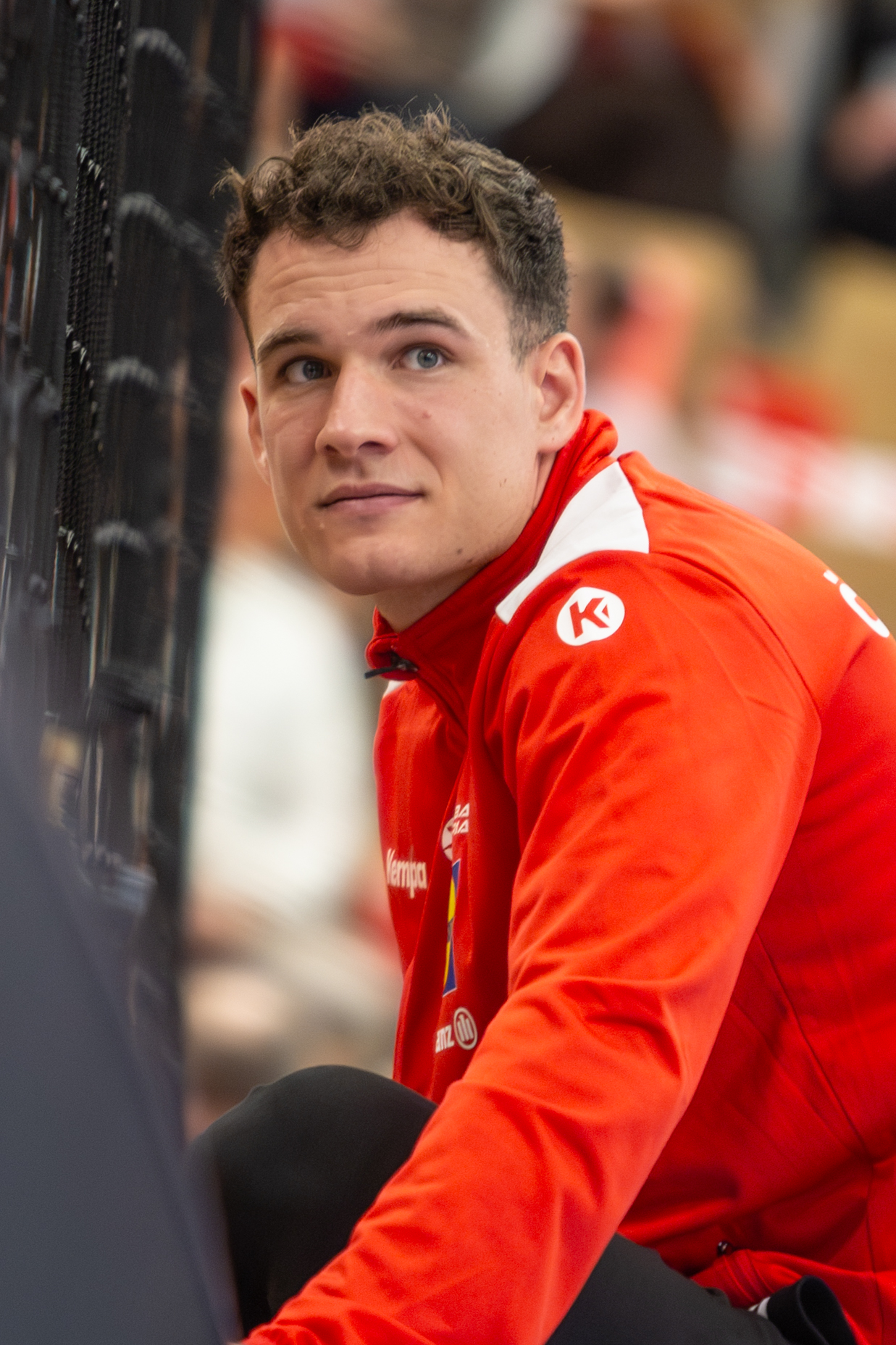

Personal information
- Nationality: Austrian
- Born: 1 April 2000 (age 26) Vienna, Austria
- Height: 1.86 m (6 ft 1 in)

Sport
- Sport: Handball
- Position: Goalkeeper
- Current club: TBV Lemgo Lippe
- Number: 98

Youth career
- Years: Team
- –: Union West Wien

Senior clubs
- Years: Team
- 2019–2023: SG Handball West Wien
- 2023–2024: Alpla HC Hard
- 2024–: TBV Lemgo Lippe
National team
Years	Team	Apps	(Gls)
2022–	Austria	23	(0)
- Updated on 5 February 2024

Constantin Möstl is (born 1 April 2000) an Austrian handballer for TBV Lemgo Lippe in Germany and the Austrian national team. He played at his first major international tournament at the 2024 European Men's Handball Championship.

== Biography ==
He is the son of the fellow Handball goalkeeper Werner Möstl.

In the 22/23 season he won the Handball Liga Austria with SG Handball West Wien. In 2024 he announced that for the 2024–25 season he would join German club TBV Lemgo Lippe.
