= Guðmundur Hólmar Helgason =

Icelandic handball player (born 1992)

Personal information
- Nationality: Icelandic
- Born: 5 August 1992 (age 34) Akureyri, Iceland
- Height: 1.92 m (6 ft 4 in)

Sport
- Sport: Handball
- Position: Centre back
- Current club: SG Handball West Wien
- Number: 6

Senior clubs
- Years: Team
- 2009–2013: Akureyri Handboltafélag
- 2013–2016: Valur
- 2016–2018: Cesson Rennes
- 2018–2020: SG Handball West Wien
- 2020–2023: Selfoss
- 2023–: Haukar
National team
Years	Team	Apps	(Gls)
–	Iceland	25	(6)

Guðmundur Hólmar Helgason (born 5 August 1992) is an Icelandic handball player who currently plays for Selfoss and the Icelandic national team.

He was a member of the Icelandic national team roster for the 2016 European Men's Handball Championship
