= Finn Lemke =

German handball player (born 1992)

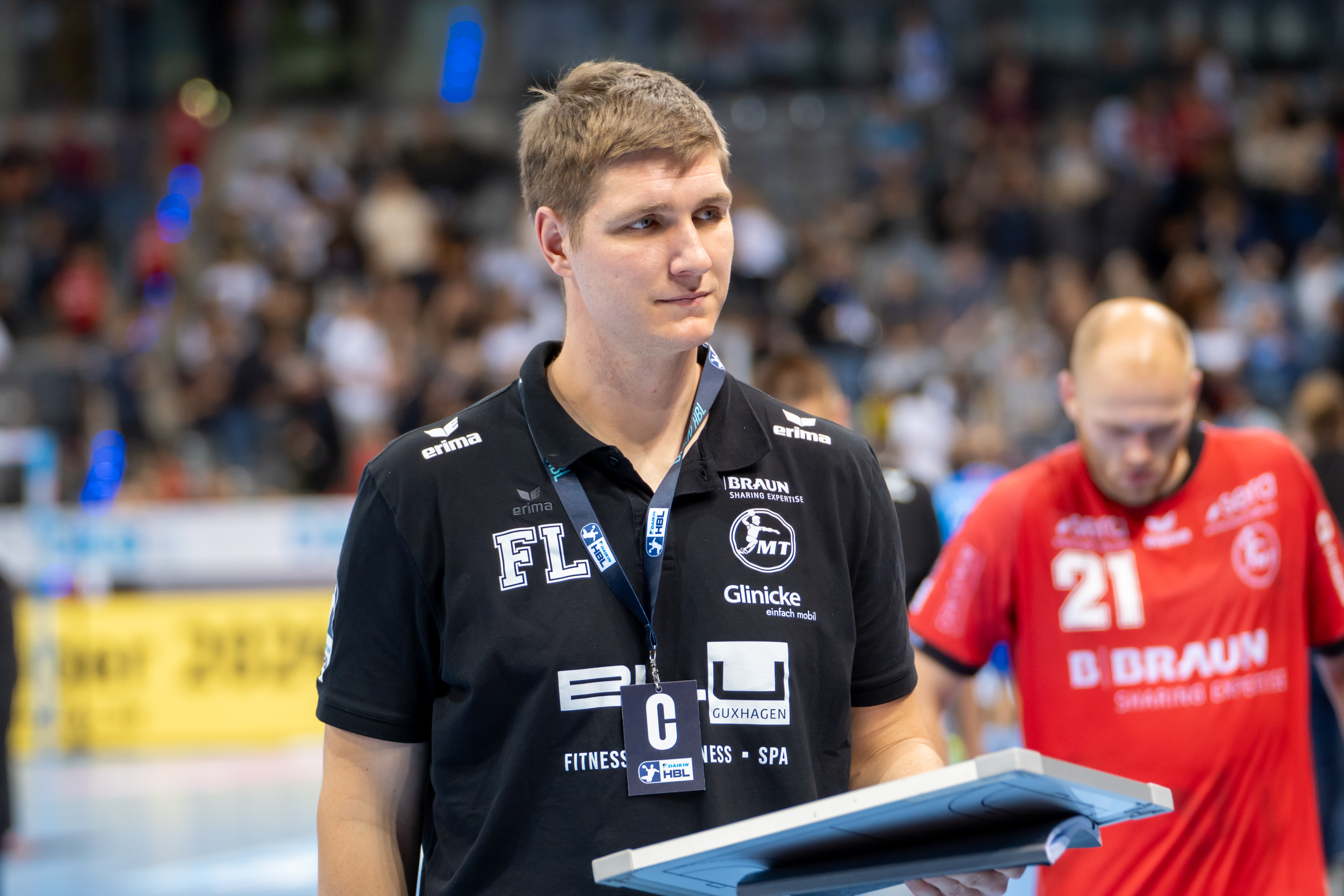
- Lemke in 2024

Personal information
- Nationality: German
- Born: 30 April 1992 (age 34) Bremen, Germany
- Height: 2.10 m (6 ft 11 in)

Sport
- Sport: Handball
- Position: Left back

Senior clubs
- Years: Team
- 2010–2011: HSG Schwanewede
- 2011–2015: TBV Lemgo
- 2015–2017: SC Magdeburg
- 2017–2023: MT Melsungen
National team
Years	Team	Apps	(Gls)
2014–2021	Germany	90	(34)
Medal record
Olympic Games
Bronze medal – third place	2016 Rio	Team competition
European Championship
Gold medal – first place	2016 Poland	Team competition

Finn Lemke (born 30 April 1992) is a German former handball player and current handball coach, who played for the German national team, and was part of the German national team that won the 2016 European Championship. He ended his career in 2023 due to injuries.

== Career ==
Lemke started playing handball at HSG Schwanewede, a club in Niedersachsen. In 2011 he played with the senior team in the Oberliga, the 5th tier of German handball. For the 2011-2012 season he joined TBV Lemgo, which had a partnership with Schwanewede at the time. In 2015 he joined SC Magdeburg, where he was mainly playing in defense. In 2016 he won the DHB-Pokal with the club.

In 2017 he joined MT Melsungen. He retired in 2023.

== National team ==
Lemke debuted for the national team on January 3rd, 2014 against Austria.

In 2016 he won the European Championship with the German team, beating Spain in the final 24:17. At the 2016 Olympics he won bronze medals with the team. For this he was awarded the Silbernes Lorbeerblatt.

At the 2018 European Championship he was part of the initial 20 man squad, but did but make the squad. He was however later included in team during the first round of the tournament, replacing Bastian Roscheck.

At the 2020 Olympics he also represented Germany, where Germany finished 6th.

== Achievements ==
- Summer Olympics:
  - Bronze: 2016
- European Championship:
  - Gold: 2016
- DHB-Pokal:
  - Gold: 2016

== Personal life ==
His younger brother Jari plays handball in Handball-Bundesliga.
