= Bartłomiej Bis =

Polish handball player (born 1997)

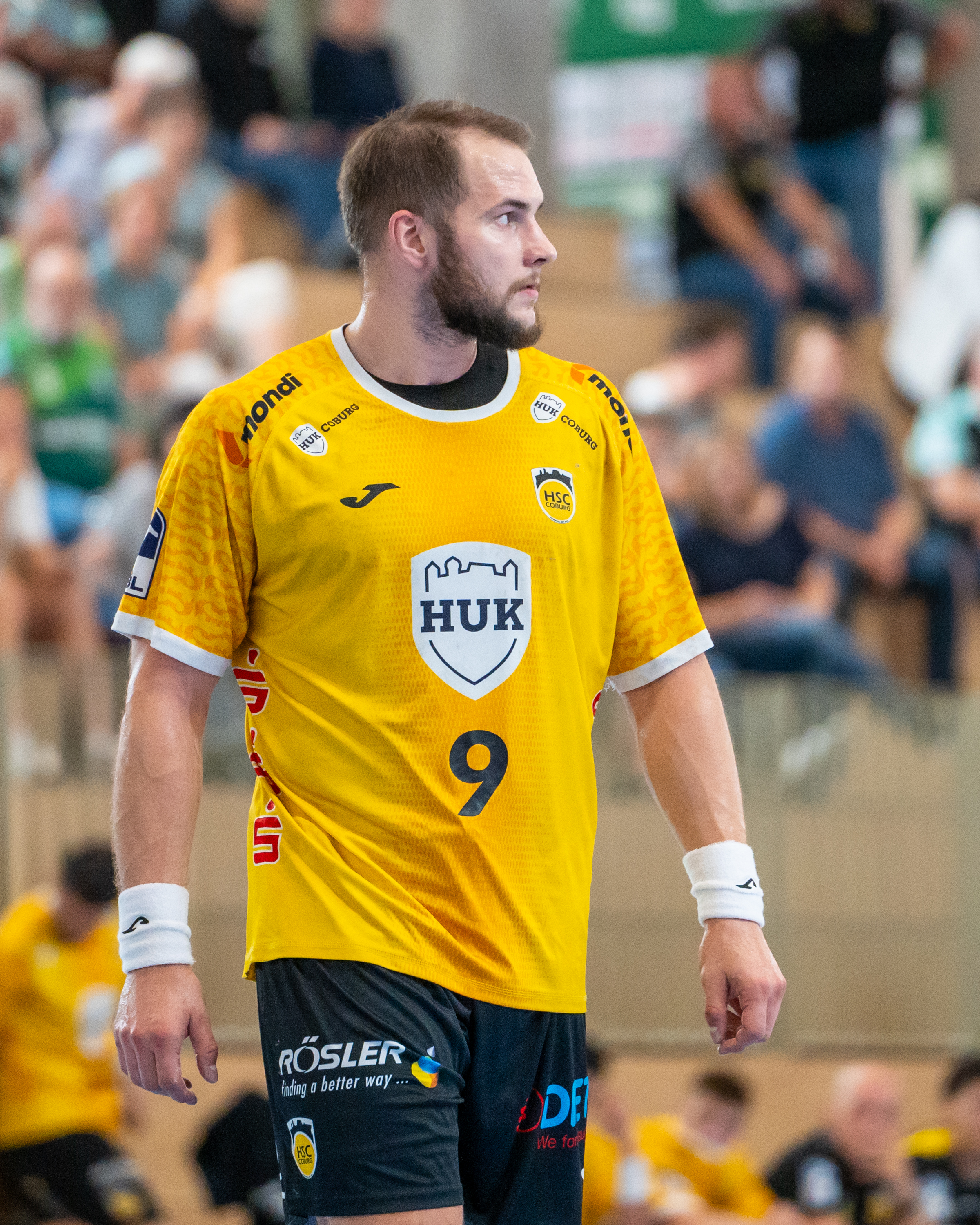

Personal information
- Nationality: Polish
- Born: 25 March 1997 (age 29) Kielce, Poland
- Height: 1.94 m (6 ft 4 in)

Sport
- Sport: Handball
- Position: Pivot
- Current club: Górnik Zabrze
- Number: 6

Youth career
- Years: Team
- –2015: PGE Vive Kielce

Senior clubs
- Years: Team
- 2015–2019: PGE Vive Kielce
- 2019–2022: Górnik Zabrze
- 2022–: HSC Coburg
National team
Years	Team	Apps	(Gls)
2021–	Poland	42	(20)
- Updated on 5 February 2025

Bartłomiej Bis (born 25 March 1997) is a Polish handball player who plays for the German team HSC Coburg and the Polish national team.

== Club career ==
He has previously played for Vive Kielce and Górnik Zabrze in his home country. With Vive Kielce he has won the Polish Championship in 2016, 2017, 2018 and 2019. In 2022 he joined the German 2nd tier side HSC Coburg.

== National team ==
He made his debut for the Polish national team on 21 December 2020 against Algeria. At the 2022 European Championship he finished 12th with Poland. He played 3 games at the tournament. At the 2025 World Men's Handball Championship he played 6 games, scoring 8 goals, when Poland finished 26th.
