= Patrik Leban =

Slovenian handball player

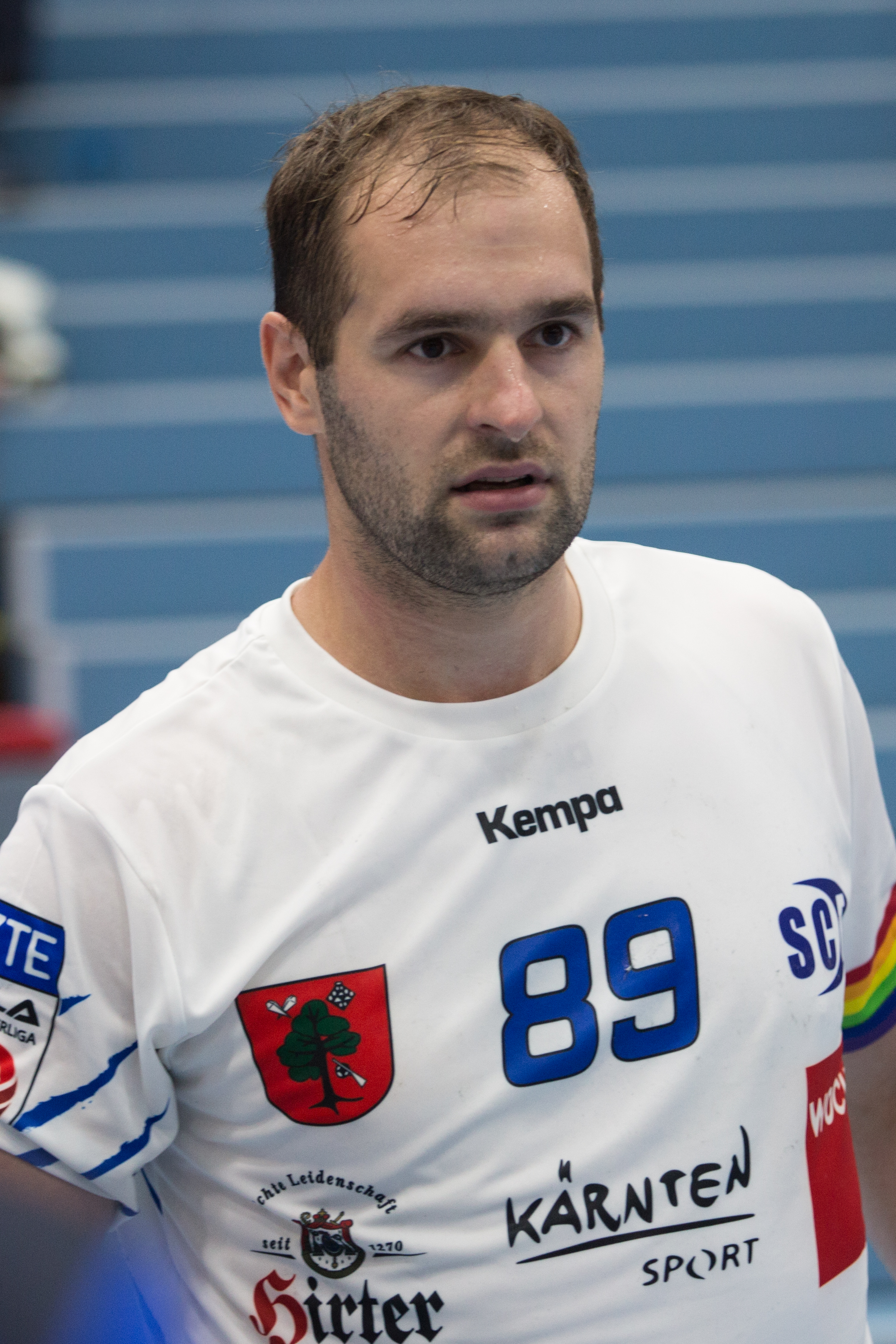

Personal information
- Nationality: Slovenian
- Born: 7 September 1989 (age 37) Ljubljana, Slovenia
- Height: 1.87 m (6 ft 2 in)

Sport
- Sport: Handball
- Position: Centre back
- Current club: SC Ferlach
- Number: 89

Senior clubs
- Years: Team
- –: RK Col
- –: RK Ajdovščina
- –: RK Sežana
- 2008–2013: MRK Krka
- 2013–2017: RD Ribnica
- 2017–2019: RK Nexe Našice
- 2019–2021: RK Celje
- 2021–2022: HC Erlangen
- 2022–: SC Ferlach
National team
Years	Team	Apps	(Gls)
2017–	Slovenia	8	(10)

Patrik Leban (born 7 September 1989) is a Slovenian handball player who plays for SC Ferlach and the Slovenian national team.

He participated at the 2018 European Men's Handball Championship.
