= SG Handball West Wien =

Austrian handball club

- Full name: Spielgemeinschaft Handball West Wien
- Nickname: Grünen
- Short name: West Wien
- Founded: 1946; 80 years ago
- Arena: BSFZ Südstadt, Maria Enzersdorf
- Capacity: 1,200
- President: Ferdinand Hager
- Head coach: Michael Draca
- League: Handball Liga Austria
- Club colours
Home	Away

SG Handball West Wien is a handball club from Wien, Austria. They currently compete in the Handball Liga Austria.

Location of SG Handball West Wien

== History ==
In 1946, police lieutenant colonel Herndl founded the club. They won the championship 6 times (1968, 1989, 1991, 1992, 1993, 2023), they were cup winners 2 times (1991, 1992). The club's greatest international success was fourth place in the EHF Champions League in the 1993/94 season.

In March 2023, manager Conny Wilczynski announced the club's withdrawal from professional handball for the coming season for economic reasons.

== Crest, colours, supporters ==
=== Kits ===
HOME

2011–13

AWAY

2011–12

== Management ==
Position	Name
Executive Director	(Austria) Konrad Wilczynski
Sport Director	(Austria) Roland Marouschek
Member Of The Board	(Austria) Roland Schlinger

== Team ==
=== Current squad ===
Squad for the 2022–23 season

SG Handball West Wien

Goalkeepers

- 3 (Austria) Constantin Möstl
- 16 (Austria) Florian Kaiper

Left Wingers

- 9 (Austria) Matthias Wegerer
- 18 (Austria) Bernhard Huber

Right Wingers

- 5 (Austria) Elias Derdak
- 13 (Austria) Franko Lastro
- 32 (Austria) Gabriel Kofler

Line Players

- 28 (Austria) Wilhelm Jelinek
- 35 (Austria) Clemens Meleschnig
- 97 (Austria) Samuel Kofler

Central Backs

- 6 (Austria) Markus Mahr
- 10 (Austria) Elias Kofler
- 11 (Austria) Paul Pfeifer
- 91 (Austria) Andreas Dräger

Left Backs

- 33 (Austria) Moritz Mittendorfer
- 67 (Austria) Fabian Bryslawski
- 99 (Austria) Marko Katic

Right Backs

- 23 (Austria) Nicolas Paulnsteiner

=== Technical staff ===
- Head Coach: (Austria) Michael Draca
- Assistant Coach: (Croatia) Sandro Uvodić
- Athletic Trainer: (Austria) Nick Haasmann
- Physiotherapist: (Austria) Pia Panzenböck
- Physiotherapist: (Austria) Julia Sladek

=== Transfers ===
Transfers for the 2026–27 season

Joining

Leaving

=== Transfer History ===
Transfers for the 2025–26 season

Joining

Leaving

- (Serbia) Predrag Mijatović (GK) to (Serbia) RK Dinamo Pančevo
- (Austria) Felix Bernkop-Schnürch (LW) to (Germany) Füchse Berlin
- (Austria) Benjamin Edionwe (GK) (retires)
- (Austria) Elias Derdak (RW) (retires)
- (Austria) Clemens Meleschnig (LP) to (Austria) BT Füchse

Transfers for the 2024–25 season

Joining

- (Serbia) Predrag Mijatović (GK) from (France) Pays d'Aix Université Club
- (Austria) Benjamin Edionwe (GK) from (Switzerland) TV Steffisburg
- (Austria) Elias Derdak (RW) from (Austria) HC Linz AG
- (Austria) Felix Bernkop-Schnürch (LW) from (Austria) WAT Fünfhaus
- (Austria) Jonas Kofler (LP) from (Austria) WAT Fünfhaus

Leaving

- (Poland) Fabian Bryslawski (LB) to (Austria) HC Linz AG

Transfers for the 2022–23 season

Joining

- (Austria) Gabriel Kofler (RW) from (Austria) WAT Fünfhaus

Leaving

- (Austria) Julian Ranftl (RW) to (Germany) HSG Nordhorn-Lingen
- (Austria) Julian Schiffleitner (RB) to (Austria) BT Füchse
- (Austria) Julian Pratschner (LW) to (Austria) WAT Fünfhaus

== Previous Squads ==
2020–2021 Team
Shirt No	Nationality	Player	Birth Date	Position
1	Croatia	Sandro Uvodić	13 July 1981 (age 45)	Goalkeeper
2	Austria	Philipp Seitz	18 March 1997 (age 29)	Left Back
3	Austria	Constantin Möstl	1 April 2000 (age 26)	Goalkeeper
6	Austria	Markus Mahr	3 November 2000 (age 25)	Central Back
7	Austria	Matthias Führer	19 March 1994 (age 32)	Right Winger
9	Austria	Matthias Wegerer	17 August 2001 (age 25)	Left Winger
10	Austria	Elias Kofler	9 August 2000 (age 26)	Central Back
11	Austria	Paul Pfeifer	8 March 2001 (age 25)	Central Back
16	Austria	Florian Kaiper	26 May 1995 (age 31)	Goalkeeper
22	Austria	Julian Schiffleitner	27 December 1994 (age 31)	Right Back
28	Austria	Wilhelm Jelinek	17 March 1994 (age 32)	Line Player
29	Austria	Julian Pratschner	29 December 1996 (age 29)	Left Winger
33	Austria	Moritz Mittendorfer	21 October 1996 (age 29)	Left Back
44	Austria	Julian Ranftl	17 February 1996 (age 30)	Right Winger
50	Austria	Marko Katic	3 December 2001 (age 24)	Left Back
75	Austria	Felix Fuchs	2 January 1999 (age 27)	Right Winger
91	Austria	Andreas Dräger	9 July 2001 (age 25)	Central Back
97	Austria	Samuel Kofler	19 May 1997 (age 29)	Line Player

2017–2018 Team
Shirt No	Nationality	Player	Birth Date	Position
1	Croatia	Sandro Uvodić	13 July 1981 (age 45)	Goalkeeper
2	Austria	Philipp Seitz	18 March 1997 (age 29)	Left Back
7	Austria	Matthias Führer	19 March 1994 (age 32)	Right Winger
13	Iceland	Ólafur Bjarki Ragnarsson	12 July 1988 (age 38)	Central Back
16	Austria	Florian Kaiper	26 May 1995 (age 31)	Goalkeeper
18	Austria	Christoph Meleschnig	7 October 1997 (age 28)	Left Winger
19	Austria	Philipp Rabenseifer	3 August 1996 (age 30)	Line Player
20	Austria	Sebastian Frimmel	18 December 1995 (age 30)	Left Winger
21	Hungary	Gábor Hajdú	20 October 1989 (age 36)	Left Back
22	Austria	Julian Schiffleitner	27 December 1994 (age 31)	Right Back
24	Austria	Mladan Jovanovic	18 June 1996 (age 30)	Central Back
28	Austria	Wilhelm Jelinek	17 March 1994 (age 32)	Line Player
29	Austria	Julian Pratschner	29 December 1996 (age 29)	Left Winger
32	Austria	Oliver Kaufmann	10 August 1997 (age 29)	Goalkeeper
33	Austria	Moritz Mittendorfer	21 October 1996 (age 29)	Left Back
44	Austria	Julian Ranftl	17 February 1996 (age 30)	Right Winger
73	Iceland	Viggó Kristjánsson	9 December 1993 (age 32)	Right Back
75	Austria	Felix Fuchs	2 January 1999 (age 27)	Right Winger

== Titles ==
The club has won the following:

Austrian Championship

- Winner (5) : 1966, 1989, 1991, 1992, 1993

Austrian Cup

- Winner (2) : 1992, 1993

EHF Champions League

- Semifinalist: 1994

== EHF ranking ==
As of 1/12/2022

Rank	Team	Points
142	(Greece) AC Diomidis Argous	34
143	(Cyprus) Parnassos Strovolou	34
144	(Croatia) RK Poreč	33
145	(Austria) SG Handball West Wien	32
146	(Bosnia and Herzegovina) RK Sloga Doboj	32
147	(Croatia) RK Dubrava	32
148	(Ukraine) HC Donbas Donetsk	32

== Former club members ==
=== Notable former players ===
- (Austria) (Montenegro) Janko Božović (2001–2006)
- (Austria) Andreas Dittert (1983–1991)
- (Austria) Christoph Edelmüller (1992-2004, 2005–2008)
- (Austria) Patrick Fölser (2011–2014)
- (Austria) Sebastian Frimmel (2013–2018)
- (Austria) Matthias Führer (2004–2021)
- (Austria) Alexander Hermann (2012–2015)
- (Austria) Wilhelm Jelinek (2005–)
- (Austria) Jakob Jochmann (2014–2017)
- (Austria) Florian Kaiper (2004–2023)
- (Austria) Marko Katic (2012–)
- (Austria) Roland Knabl (2008–2011)
- (Austria) Elias Kofler (2018–)
- (Austria) (Serbia) Nikola Marinovic (2002–2005)
- (Austria) Thomas Menzl (1979–1988)
- (Austria) Werner Möstl (1981-2006, 2008–2010, 2015)
- (Austria) (Slovenia) Dean Pomorisac (2010–2011)
- (Austria) Fabian Posch (2014–2016)
- (Austria) Julian Pratschner (2014-2022)
- (Austria) Julian Ranftl (2013–2022)
- (Austria) Julian Schiffleitner (2014–2022)
- (Austria) Philipp Seitz (2015–2021)
- (Austria) Ibish Thaqi (2000–2001)
- (Austria) Markus Wagesreiter (2012–2016)
- (Austria) Konrad Wilczynski (1992-2002, 2011–2014)
- (Chile) Erwin Feuchtmann (2016–2017)
- (Chile) Patricio Martínez Chávez (2009–2012)
- (Croatia) Duje Miljak (2014–2016)
- (Croatia) Sandro Uvodić (2012–2021)
- (Hungary) Gábor Hajdú (2016–2018)
- (Iceland) Guðmundur Hólmar Helgason (2018-2020)
- (Iceland) Hannes Jón Jónsson (2015–2016)
- (Iceland) Viggó Kristjánsson (2017-2019)
- (Iceland) Ólafur Bjarki Ragnarsson (2017–2019)
- (Latvia) Jānis Pavlovičs (2012-2013)
- (Lithuania) Augustas Strazdas (2011–2016)
- (Montenegro) Vladimir Osmajić (2004–2006)
- (Serbia) Igor Butulija (2001–2006)

=== Former coaches ===
Seasons	Coach	Country
2008–2011	Gerald Grabner	(Austria)
2011–2013	Romas Magelinskas	(Lithuania) (Austria)
2013–2015	Erlingur Richardsson	(Iceland)
2015–2019	Hannes Jón Jónsson	(Iceland)
2019–2020	Roland Marouschek	(Austria)
2020–	Michael Draca	(Austria)
