= HK FCC Město Lovosice =

Czech handball club

- Short name: HK Lovosice
- Founded: 1956; 69 years ago
- Arena: Sportovní hala Chemik
- Capacity: 950
- President: Vojtěch Srba
- Head coach: Roman Jelínek
- League: Chance Extraliga
- Club colours
Home	Away

HK FCC Město Lovosice is a handball club from Lovosice, Czech Republic, that plays in the Chance Extraliga.

Location of HK Lovosice

== History ==
The club was founded in 1956, then as a women's handball division. Later, women's handball was relegated to the background, and in 1969 it was completely discontinued. Almost at the same time as the women, but a year later, a male student category was added, and then gradually the men as well. Club advanced in 1977 to the first Czechoslovak league. In 1982 was built Sportovní hala Chemik. Club played in EHF Challenge Cup in 2008/2009 EHF Cup in 2012/2013 and EHF European Cup in 2023/2024 and 2024/2025.

== Crest, colours, supporters ==
=== Kit manufacturers ===
Period	Kit manufacturer
– 2018	(Denmark) Hummel
2018 – present	(Germany) Kempa

=== Kits ===
HOME
2010–13	2013–14	2016–17	2017–18	2019–20	2020–21	2021–24

AWAY
2010–13	2016–17	2017–18	2019–20	2021–24

THIRD
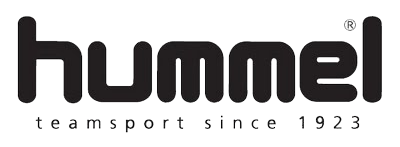
2010–13

== Management ==
Position	Name
Club Director:	(Czech Republic) Vojtěch Srba
Sport Director	(Czech Republic) Jan Landa
Technical Director	(Czech Republic) Jan Heřmanovský

== Team ==
=== Current squad ===
Squad for the 2023–24 season

HK Lovosice

Goalkeepers

- 1 (Czech Republic) Jakub Lavička
- 12 (Czech Republic) Antonín Bartošík
- 61 (Czech Republic) Artur Adamík
- 71 (Czech Republic) Jiří Günl
- 87 (Czech Republic) Jan Dohnal
- 32 (Israel) (Poland) Tom Shem Tov

Left Wingers

- 7 (Czech Republic) Pavel Chotěborský
- 8 (Czech Republic) Jiří Motl

Right Wingers

- 45 (Czech Republic) Jan Heřmanovský
- 99 (Czech Republic) Bohdan Mizera

Line Players

- 2 (Czech Republic) Karel Holubec
- 42 (Czech Republic) Patrik Stach

Central Backs

- 5 (Czech Republic) Jan Kupa
- 25 (Czech Republic) Pavel Vojíř

Left Backs

- 3 (Czech Republic) Jaroslav Ouředník
- 4 (Czech Republic) Tadeáš Pokorný
- 20 (Czech Republic) Jaroslav Trkovský
- 21 (Czech Republic) Lukáš Lukáč
- 23 (Czech Republic) Michal Bednařík
- 28 (Czech Republic) Pavel Horák

Right Backs

- 13 (Czech Republic) Marek Hniďák
- 17 (Georgia (country)) Giorgi Dikhaminjia

=== Technical staff ===
- Head Coach: (Czech Republic) Roman Jelínek
- Assistant Coach: (Czech Republic) Martin Hríb
- Physiotherapist: (Czech Republic) Petra Čermáková
- Masseur: (Czech Republic) Natálie Házlová

=== Transfers ===
Transfers for the 2025–26 season

Joining

- (Slovakia) Tomáš Fech (RW) from (Slovakia) HT Tatran Prešov

Leaving

=== Transfer History ===
Transfers for the 2023–24 season

Joining

- (Georgia (country)) Giorgi Dikhaminjia (RB) from (Germany) TSG Lübbenau 63
- (Czech Republic) Bohdan Mizera (RW) from (Czech Republic) HC Zubří
- (Israel) (Poland) Tom Shem Tov (GK) from (Sweden) Lif Lindesberg

Leaving

- (Ukraine) Serhii Petrychenko (LP) to (Hungary) PLER-Budapest
- (Slovenia) Tim Jenko Bogdanić (RB) to (Hungary) Carbonex-Komló

== Previous squads ==
2012–2013 Team
Shirt No	Nationality	Player	Birth Date	Position
1	Czech Republic	Jan Šálek	16 June 1987 (age 38)	Goalkeeper
3	Czech Republic	Miloslav Krahulik	27 September 1977 (age 48)	Right Back
4	Czech Republic	Jan Landa	10 May 1986 (age 39)	Left Back
5	Czech Republic	Jan Dlouhy	5 March 1994 (age 31)	Left Winger
6	Czech Republic	Pavel Miks	24 April 1993 (age 32)	Right Back
7	Czech Republic	Miloslav Sýkora	5 March 1992 (age 33)	Left Winger
8	Czech Republic	Jiří Motl	29 September 1984 (age 41)	Left Winger
9	Czech Republic	Jiří Brecko	20 March 1988 (age 37)	Left Winger
11	Czech Republic	Ondřej Havlovec	22 April 1989 (age 36)	Line Player
13	Czech Republic	Roman Jelinek	26 June 1991 (age 34)	Central Back
16	Czech Republic	Jan Jakub	6 July 1991 (age 34)	Goalkeeper
17	Czech Republic	Pavel Chroustovský	9 July 1986 (age 39)	Left Back
19	Czech Republic	Václav Klimt	21 October 1990 (age 35)	Left Back
23	Czech Republic	Milan Berka	23 January 1978 (age 47)	Central Back
25	Czech Republic	Jakub Škvařil	10 September 1986 (age 39)	Right Winger
29	Czech Republic	Josef Jonaš	23 July 1994 (age 31)	Right Back
32	Czech Republic	Jakub Kolomaznik	20 September 1991 (age 34)	Line Player
61	Czech Republic	Artur Adamík	26 January 1990 (age 35)	Goalkeeper
77	Czech Republic	Lukáš Malý	7 April 1994 (age 31)	Right Winger

2008–2009 Team
Shirt No	Nationality	Player	Birth Date	Position
1	Czech Republic	Jan Šálek	16 June 1987 (age 38)	Goalkeeper
3	Czech Republic	Radim Vanek	27 June 1978 (age 47)	Right Winger
4	Czech Republic	Tomáš Havir	5 November 1986 (age 39)	Right Back
6	Czech Republic	Lukáš Mechyr	3 August 1988 (age 37)	Right Winger
7	Czech Republic	Tomáš Kratochvíl	7 September 1980 (age 45)	Left Back
8	Czech Republic	Jiří Motl	29 September 1984 (age 41)	Left Winger
9	Czech Republic	Jiří Brecko	20 March 1988 (age 37)	Left Winger
10	Czech Republic	Radoslav Miler	12 July 1986 (age 39)	Right Back
11	Czech Republic	Ondřej Havlovec	22 April 1989 (age 36)	Line Player
13	Czech Republic	Roman Jelinek	26 June 1991 (age 34)	Central Back
14	Czech Republic	Radek Jelinek	21 December 1988 (age 37)	Right Winger
17	Czech Republic	Tomáš Jablonka	1 June 1987 (age 38)	Left Winger
18	Czech Republic	Jiří Havlat	15 September 1985 (age 40)	Central Back
19	North Macedonia	Petar Kogoj	24 December 1982 (age 43)	Line Player
20	Czech Republic	Ludek Kylišek	14 April 1983 (age 42)	Goalkeeper
69	Czech Republic	David Kylišek	5 February 1985 (age 40)	Central Back

== Accomplishments ==
- Czech Handball Extraliga:
  - Silver: 2011, 2015
  - Bronze: 2006, 2007, 2014

== EHF ranking ==
As of 23/11/2023

Rank	Team	Points
219	(Denmark) Ribe-Esbjerg HH	9
220	(Finland) Dicken	9
221	(Azerbaijan) Azeryol HC	9
222	(Czech Republic) HK Lovosice	9
223	(Azerbaijan) Kur Mingachevir	9
224	(Estonia) HC Mistra Tallinn	9
225	(Montenegro) RK Budućnost Podgorica	9

== Former club members ==
=== Notable former players ===
- (Czech Republic) František Arnošt (1975–1978)
- (Czech Republic) Milan Berka (1995–1998, 2010–2013)
- (Czech Republic) Bedřich Ciner (1970–1972)
- (Czech Republic) Pavel Horák (2022–)
- (Czech Republic) Jan Landa (2015–2018)
- (Czech Republic) Jiří Motl (2002–)
- (Czech Republic) Jakub Vaněk (2015–2020)

=== Former coaches ===
Seasons	Coach	Country
-2016	Vladimír Šuma	(Czech Republic)
2016–2019	Milan Berka	(Czech Republic)
2019–2020	Jan Landa	(Czech Republic)
2020–	Roman Jelínek	(Czech Republic)
