= Espen Christensen =

Norwegian handball player (born 1985)

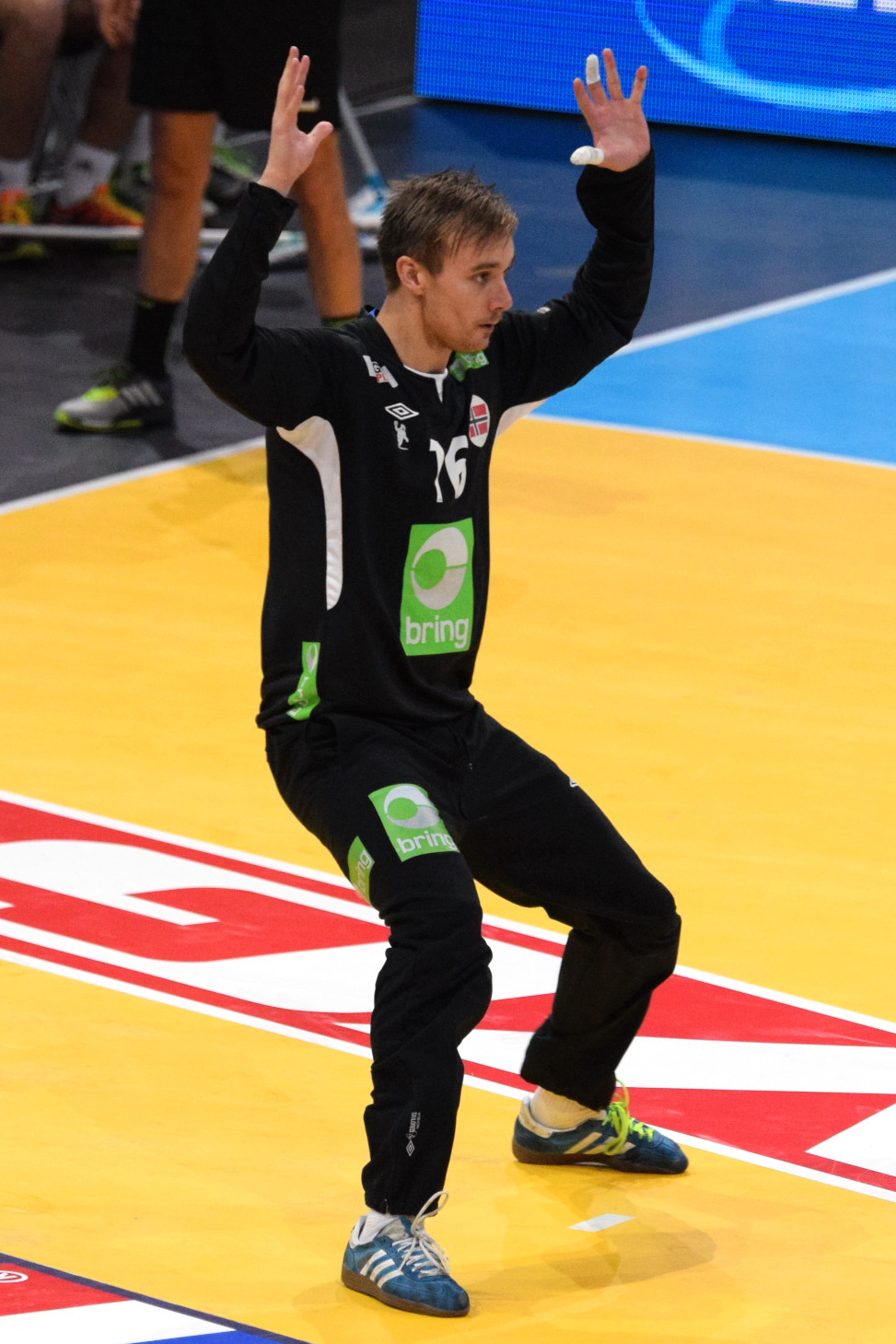
- Christensen in 2016

Personal information
- Nationality: Norwegian
- Born: 17 June 1985 (age 41) Stavanger, Norway
- Height: 1.90 m (6 ft 3 in)

Sport
- Sport: Handball
- Position: Goalkeeper
- Current club: OV Helsingborg
- Number: 1

Senior clubs
- Years: Team
- 2008–2012: H 43 Lund
- 2012–2015: Lugi HF
- 2015–2017: GOG
- 2017–2020: GWD Minden
- 2020–2023: IFK Kristianstad
- 2023–2025: OV Helsingborg
National team
Years	Team	Apps	(Gls)
2012–2021	Norway	112	(2)
Medal record
World Championship
Silver medal – second place	2017 France
Silver medal – second place	2019 Germany/Denmark
European Championship
Bronze medal – third place	2020 Sweden/Austria/Norway

Espen Heggli Christensen (born 17 June 1985) is a Norwegian handball player for OV Helsingborg and formerly the Norwegian national team.

He competed at the 2016 European Men's Handball Championship.

== Honours ==
- Swedish Handball League
  - Winner: 2023
- Swedish Handball Cup
  - Winner: 2023
