= Jan Landa =

Czech handball player

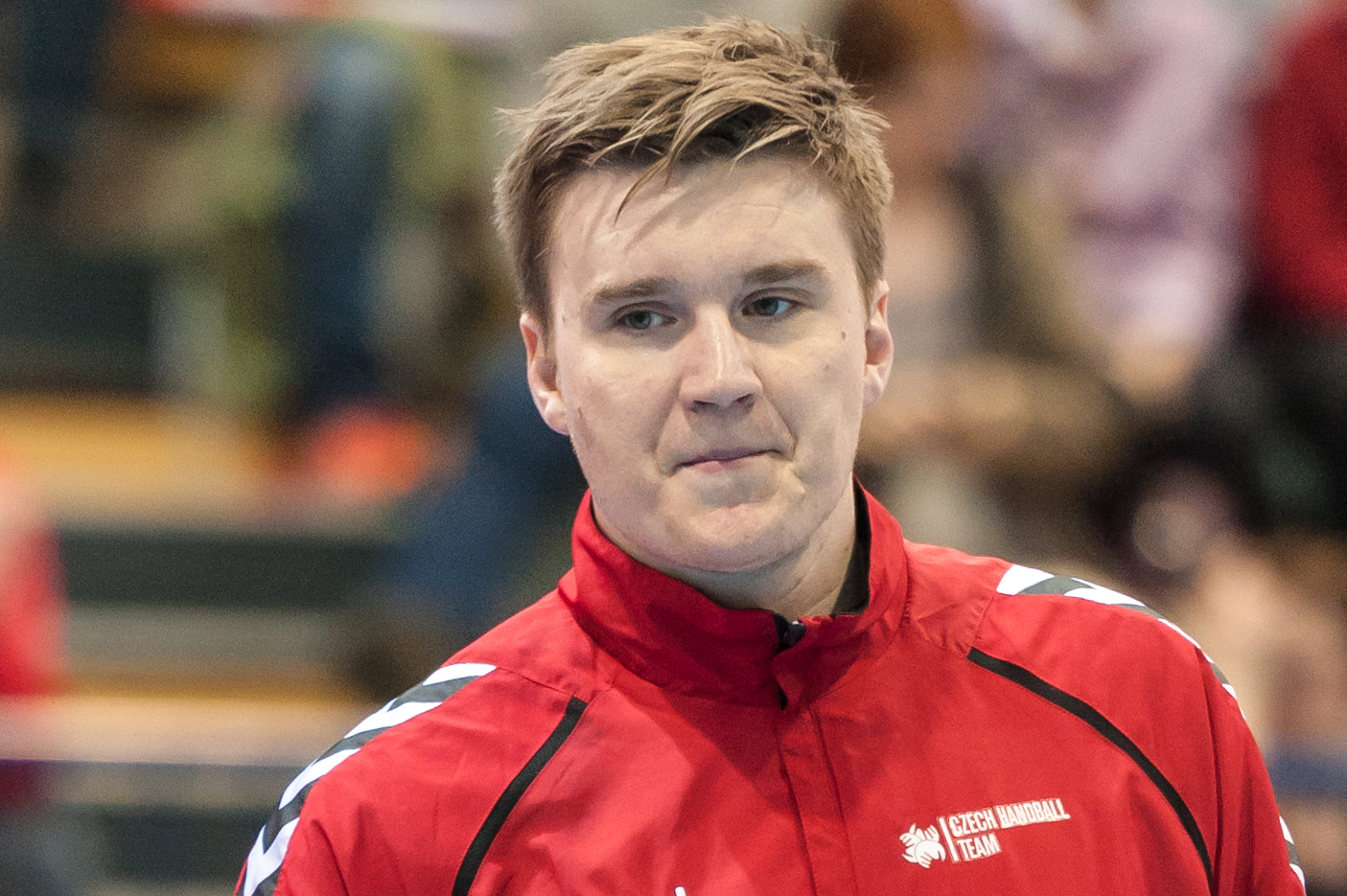

Personal information
- Nationality: Czech
- Born: 10 May 1986 (age 40) Litoměřice, Czechoslovakia
- Height: 1.95 m (6 ft 5 in)

Sport
- Sport: Handball
- Position: Left back
- Current club: HK Lovosice
- Number: 4
National team
Years	Team	Apps	(Gls)
–	Czech Republic	46	(20)

Jan Landa (born 10 May 1986) is a Czech handball player for HK Lovosice and the Czech national team.

He participated at the 2018 European Men's Handball Championship.
