= Julian Ranftl =

Austrian handball player (born 1996)

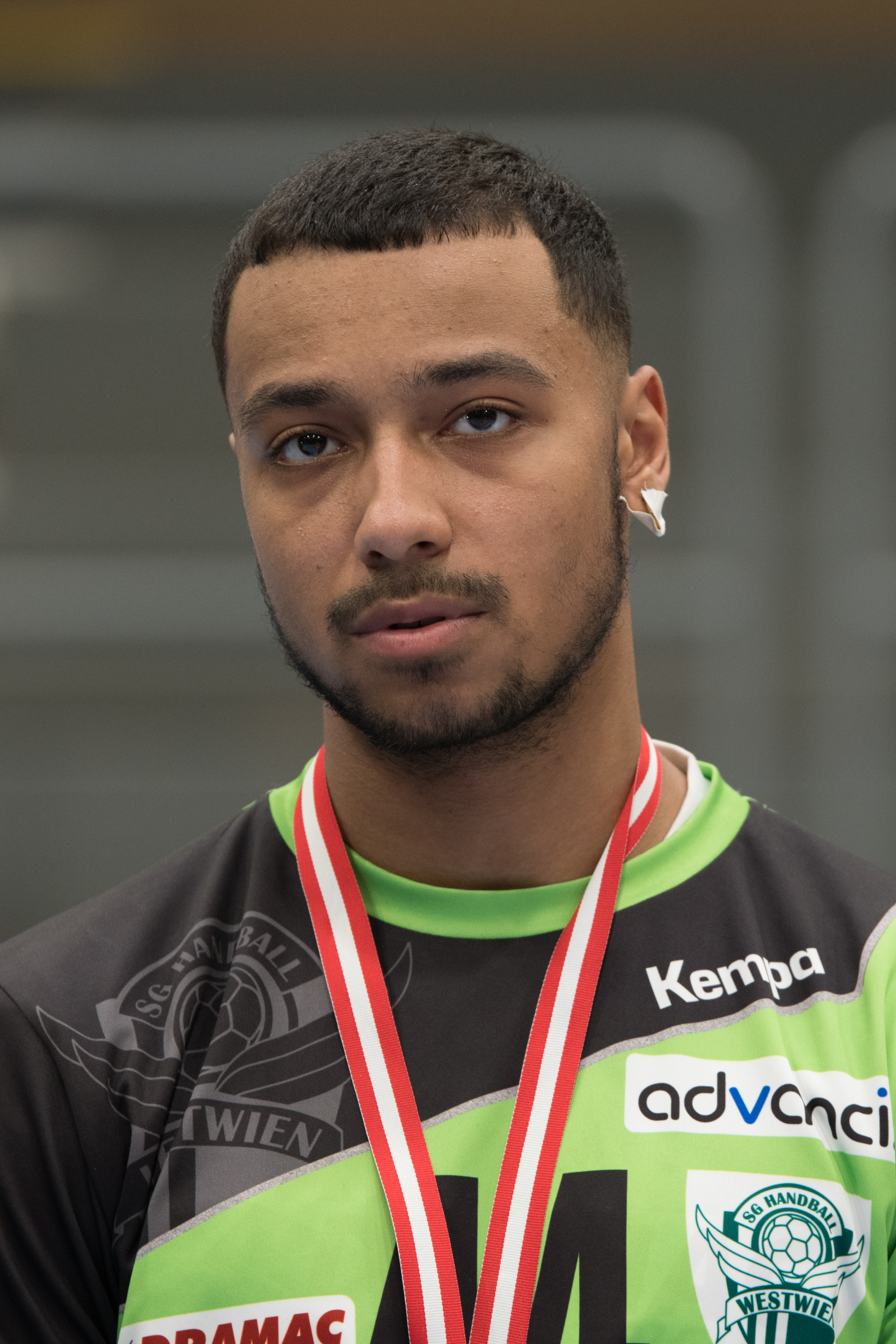

Personal information
- Nationality: Austrian
- Born: 17 February 1996 (age 30) Vienna, Austria
- Height: 1.84 m (6 ft 0 in)

Sport
- Sport: Handball
- Position: Right wing
- Number: 44

Senior clubs
- Years: Team
- 2013–2022: SG West Wien
- 2022–2023: HSG Nordhorn-Lingen
National team
Years	Team	Apps	(Gls)
2016	Austria	33	(47)
- Updated on 7 July 2023

Julian Ranftl (born 17 February 1996) is an Austrian handball player for SG West Wien and the Austrian national team.

He participated at the 2018 European Men's Handball Championship.
