= Wilhelm Jelinek =

Austrian handball player (born 1994)

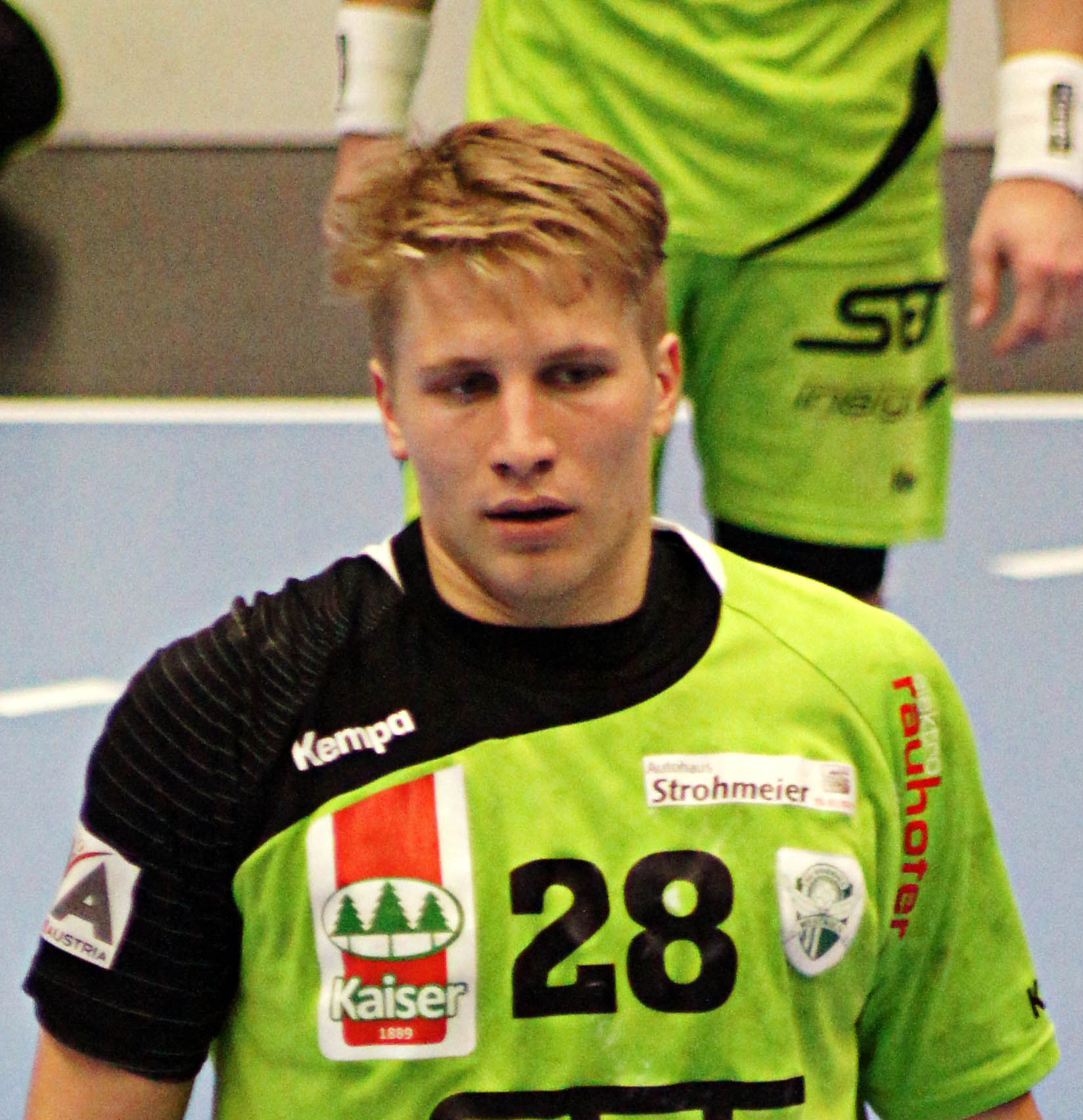

Personal information
- Nationality: Austrian
- Born: 17 March 1994 (age 32) Vienna, Austria
- Height: 1.91 m (6 ft 3 in)

Sport
- Sport: Handball
- Position: Pivot
- Current club: SG West Wien
- Number: 28
National team
| Years | Team | Apps | (Gls) |
| – | Austria | 28 | (31) |

Wilhelm Jelinek (born 17 March 1994) is an Austrian handball player for SG West Wien and the Austrian national team.

He participated at the 2018 European Men's Handball Championship.

== Career ==
Further, Wilhelm Jelinek participated with the youth national team of the 1994 vintage and twice in a youth European championship and was able to achieve 6th place in each case. In preparation for the 2014 domestic U-20 Men's European Handball Championship, Team 94, as it was called in Austria, participated in HLA play.
