= Tin Kontrec =

Croatian handball player (born 1989)

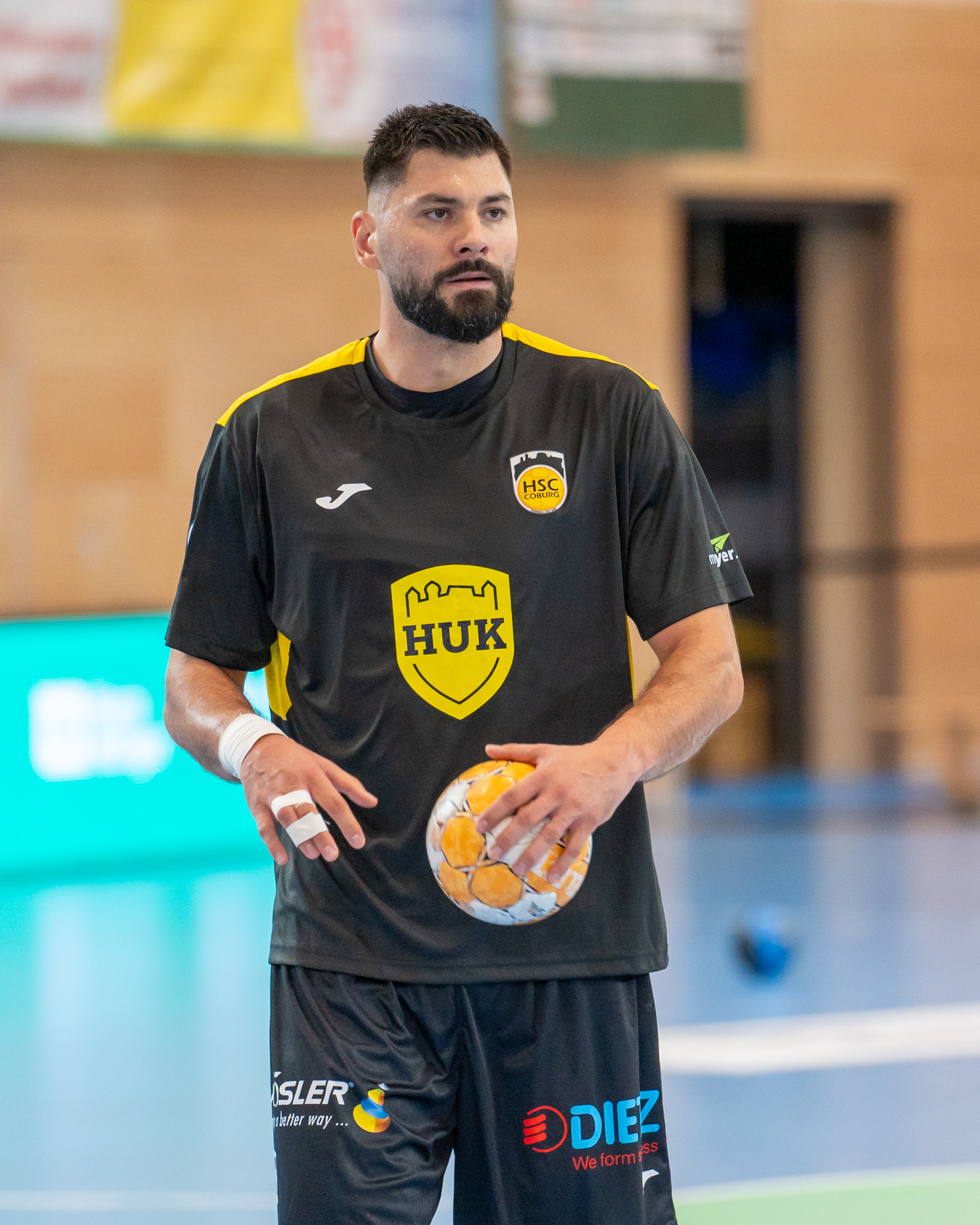
- Kontrec 2026

Personal information
- Nationality: Croatian
- Born: 9 September 1989 (age 37) Našice, SFR Yugoslavia
- Height: 1.96 m (6 ft 5 in)

Sport
- Sport: Handball
- Position: Pivot
- Current club: TuS N-Lübbecke
- Number: 20

Senior clubs
- Years: Team
- –: RK Bjelovar
- –2015: RK Varteks Varaždin
- 2015–2019: RK Zagreb
- 2019–2021: VfL Gummersbach
- 2021–: TuS N-Lübbecke
National team
Years	Team	Apps	(Gls)
–	Croatia	20	(22)
Medal record
Mediterranean Games
Gold medal – first place	2018 Tarragona	Team
- Updated on 7 October 2023

Tin Kontrec (born 9 September 1989) is a Croatian handball player for German club TuS N-Lübbecke and the Croatian national team.

He participated at the 2017 World Men's Handball Championship. In 2018 he won the Mediterranean Games with the Croatian team.

In 2019 he joined VfL Gummersbach in the German 2. Handball-Bundesliga. In 2021 he joined TuS N-Lübbecke in the top league.
