= Bastian Roscheck =

German handball player (born 1991)

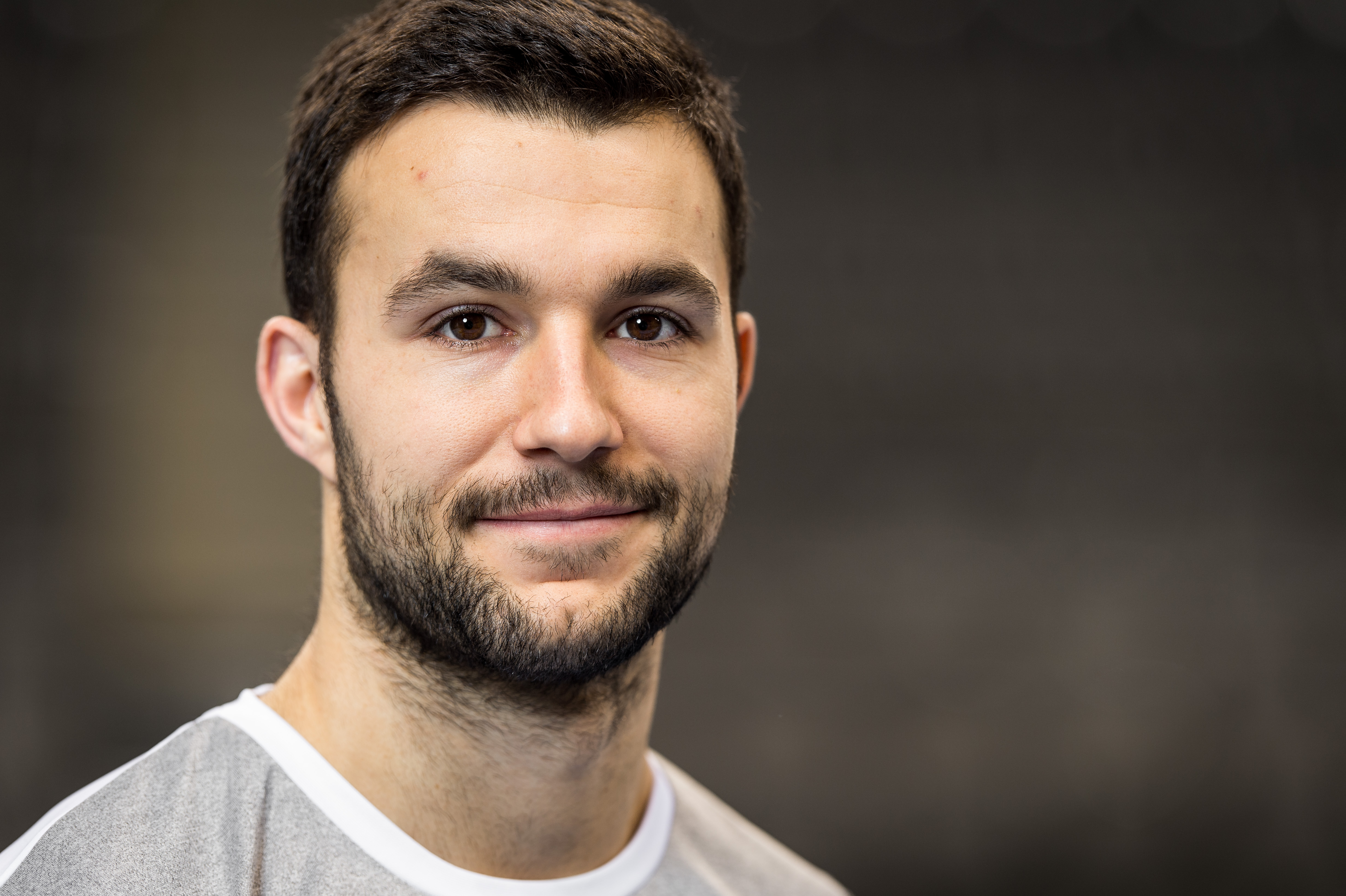
- Roscheck in 2018

Personal information
- Nationality: German
- Born: 24 February 1991 (age 35) Krefeld, Germany
- Height: 1.90 m (6 ft 3 in)

Sport
- Sport: Handball
- Position: Pivot
- Current club: SC DHfK Leipzig
- Number: 19

Youth career
- Years: Team
- –2010: TV Oppum
- 2010: HSG Düsseldorf

Senior clubs
- Years: Team
- 2010–2013: OSC Rheinhausen
- 2012–2013: HG Saarlouis
- 2013–2021: SC DHfK Leipzig
- 2021–2023: TSV Hannover-Burgdorf
- 2024: HSG Krefeld Niederrhein
National team
Years	Team	Apps	(Gls)
2018	Germany	4	(1)

Bastian Roscheck (born 24 February 1991) is a German former handball player. He featured in the German national team.

He debuted for the German national team in a friendly against Iceland in 2018. He participated at the 2018 European Men's Handball Championship. He would not feature in the national team afterwards.
