= Dieudonné Mubenzem =

Czech handball player

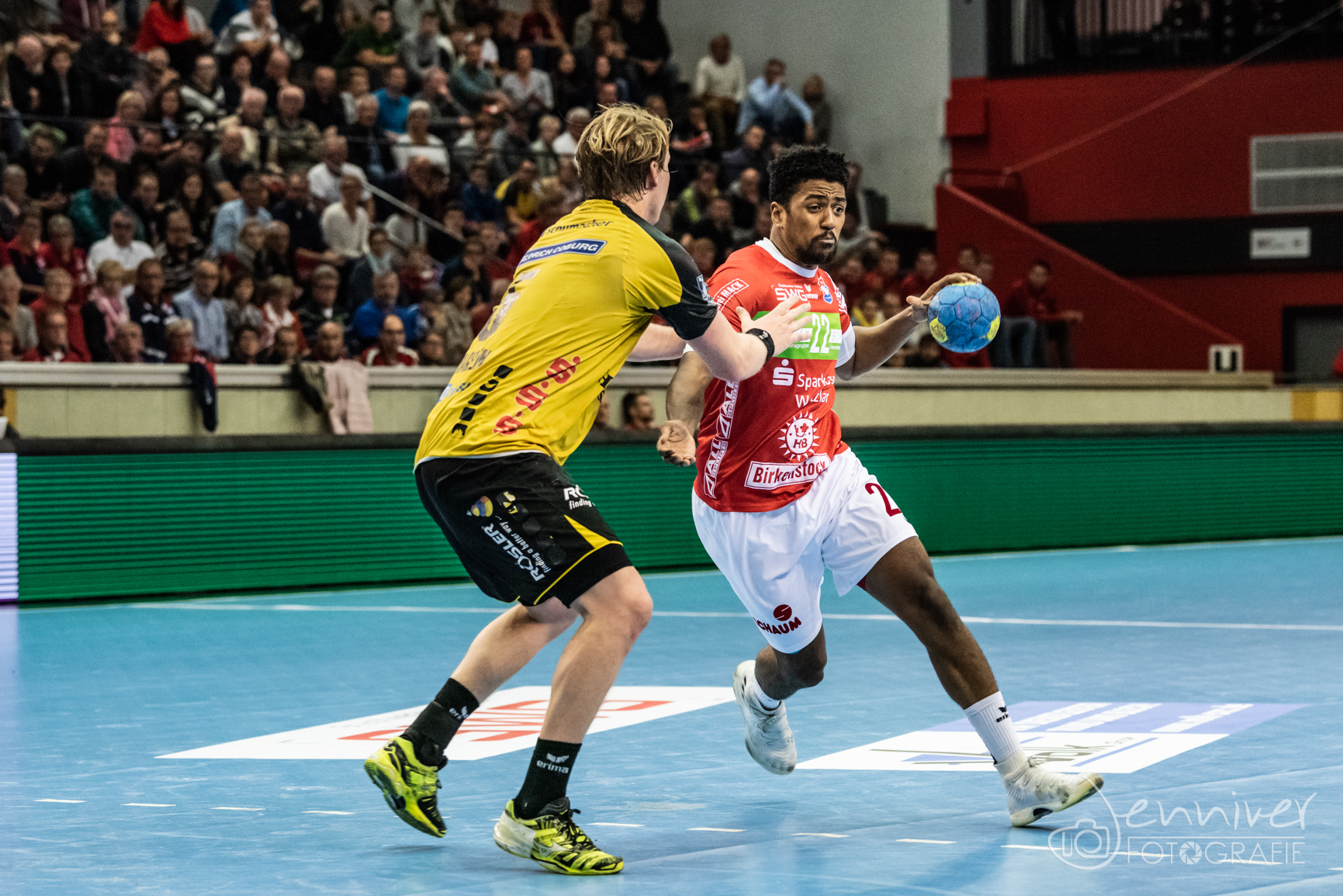

Personal information
- Nationality: Czech
- Born: 22 March 1996 (age 30) Prague, Czech Republic
- Height: 1.90 m (6 ft 3 in)

Sport
- Sport: Handball
- Position: Right back
- Current club: TV Hüttenberg
- Number: 22
National team
Years	Team	Apps	(Gls)
2017-	Czech Republic	73	(149)
- Updated on 22 July 2023

Dieudonné Mubenzem (born 22 March 1996) is a Czech handball player for TV Hüttenberg and the Czech national team.

He participated at the 2018 European Men's Handball Championship.

His father is from the Democratic Republic of the Congo, while his mother is Colombian. They met during their university studies in former Czechoslovakia.
