= 2017–18 EHF Cup =

European handball tournament

EHF Cup
- 2017–18

Tournament information
- Sport: Handball
- Dates: 2 September 2017–20 May 2018
- Host: SC Magdeburg (final four)
- Venue: GETEC Arena (final four)
- Teams: 60+3 (qualification stage); 16 (group stage)

Final positions
- Champions: (Germany) Füchse Berlin
- Runner-up: (France) Saint-Raphaël

Tournament statistics
- MVP: (Slovenia) Marko Bezjak
- Top scorer(s): (Denmark) Hans Lindberg (82 goals)

The 2017–18 EHF Cup was the 37th edition of the EHF Cup, the second most important European handball club competition organised by the European Handball Federation (EHF), and the sixth edition since the merger with the EHF Cup Winners' Cup.

Füchse Berlin won the title, beating Saint-Raphaël Var Handball in the final.

== Team allocation ==
=== Teams ===
The labels in the parentheses show how each team qualified for the place of its starting round:

- TH: Title holders
- 1st, 2nd, 3rd, 4th, 5th, 6th, etc.: League position
- CW: Domestic cup winners
- CL QS: Losers from the Champions League qualification stage.

Third qualifying round
(Germany) Frisch Auf Göppingen (TH)	(Hungary) CYEB Budakalász (4th)	(Poland) KS Azoty-Puławy (3rd)	(Slovenia) RD Koper 2013 (4th)
(Germany) Füchse Berlin (4th)	(Spain) BM Logroño La Rioja (3rd)	(Denmark) Bjerringbro-Silkeborg (3rd)	(Sweden) Lugi HF (2nd)
(Germany) SC Magdeburg (5th)	(Spain) Fraikin Granollers (4th)	(Denmark) Ribe-Esbjerg HH (4th)	(Austria) Alpla HC Hard (CL QS)
(Hungary) Grundfos Tatabánya KC (3rd)	(France) Saint-Raphaël Var Handball (4th)	(Slovenia) RD Riko Ribnica (3rd)	(Slovakia) Tatran Prešov (CL QS)
Second qualifying round
(Hungary) Csurgói KK (5th)	(Denmark) TTH Holstebro (5th)	(Romania) HC Dobrogea Sud Constanța (4th)	(Netherlands) OCI-Lions (1st)
(Hungary) Balatonfüredi KSE (6th)	(Croatia) RK Nexe Našice (2nd)	(Switzerland) Pfadi Winterthur (2nd)	(Finland) Riihimäki Cocks (CL QS)
(Spain) Helvetia Anaitasuna (5th)	(Portugal) FC Porto (2nd)	(Switzerland) Wacker Thun (4th)	
(France) Chambéry Savoie Mont-Blanc (5th)	(Sweden) HK Malmö (4th)	(Belarus) SKA Minsk (2nd)	
(Poland) Gwardia Opole (5th)	(Romania) CSM București (2nd)	(Russia) Saint Petersburg HC (2nd)	
First qualifying round
(North Macedonia) HC Ohrid 2013 (3rd)	(Serbia) Vojvodina (1st)	(Austria) Bregenz Handball (5th)	(Luxembourg) Handball Esch (1st)
(Croatia) RK Dubrava (3rd)	(Serbia) HC Dinamo Pančevo (2nd)	(Greece) Olympiacos SFP (1st)	(Israel) Maccabi Srugo Rishon LeZion (1st)
(Croatia) HRK Gorica (4th)	(Czech Republic) HC Dukla Praha (1st)	(Greece) AC Doukas (2nd)	(Italy) SSV Bozen Loacker Volksbank (1st)
(Portugal) SL Benfica (3rd)	(Czech Republic) Talent Robstav M.A.T. Plzeň (2nd)	(Iceland) Valur FC (1st)	(Moldova) HC Olimpus-85 USEFS (1st)
(Switzerland) HC Kriens-Luzern (3rd)	(Belgium) Achilles Bocholt (1st)	(Iceland) Fimleikafélag Hafnarfjarðar (2nd)	(Lithuania) Klaipėda Dragūnas (1st)
(Ukraine) ZTR Zaporizhia (2nd)	(Netherlands) KRAS/Volendam (2nd)	(Iceland) Afturelding (3rd)	(Montenegro) RK Partizan 1949 Tivat (1st)
(Norway) BSK Handball Elite (2nd)	(Turkey) Beykoz BLD SK (2nd)	(Estonia) Põlva Serviti (1st)	
(Norway) ØIF Arendal (4th)	(Austria) SG INSIGNIS Handball Westwien (3rd)	(Kosovo) KH BESA Farm Gas (1st)	

== Round and draw dates ==
The schedule of the competition was as follows (all draws were held at the EHF headquarters in Vienna, Austria):

Phase	Round	Draw date	First leg	Second leg
Qualification	First qualifying round	18 July 2017	2-3 September 2017	9-10 September 2017
Qualification	Second qualifying round	18 July 2017	7–8 October 2017	14–15 October 2017
Qualification	Third qualifying round	17 October 2017	18–19 November 2017	25–26 November 2017
Group stage	Matchday 1	30 November 2017	10–11 February 2018	
Group stage	Matchday 2	30 November 2017	17–18 February 2018	
Group stage	Matchday 3	30 November 2017	24–25 February 2018	
Group stage	Matchday 4	30 November 2017	3–4 March 2018	
Group stage	Matchday 5	30 November 2017	24–25 March 2018	
Group stage	Matchday 6	30 November 2017	31 March–1 April 2018	
Knockout phase	Quarter-finals	3 April 2018	21–22 April 2018	28–29 April 2018
Knockout phase	Final four	1 May 2018	19–20 May 2018	

== Qualification stage ==
The qualification stage consists of three rounds, which are played as two-legged ties using a home-and-away system. In the draws for each round, teams were allocated into two pots, with teams from Pot 1 facing teams from Pot 2. The winners of each pairing (highlighted in bold) qualified for the following round.

For each round, teams listed first played the first leg at home. In some cases, teams agreed to play both matches at the same venue.

=== Round 1 ===
A total of 30 teams entered the draw for the first qualification round, which was held on Tuesday, 18 July 2017. The draw seeding pots were composed as follows:

Pot 1	Pot 2
(Croatia) RK Dubrava; (Portugal) SL Benfica; (Norway) BSK Handball Elite; (Ukraine) ZTR Zaporizhia; (Czech Republic) HC Dukla Praha; (Iceland) Valur FC; (Israel) Maccabi Srugo Rishon LeZion; (Austria) SG INSIGNIS Handball Westwien; (Belgium) Achilles Bocholt; (Serbia) Vojvodina; (Greece) Olympiacos SFP; (Kosovo) KH BESA Farm Gas; (Netherlands) KRAS/Volendam; (Luxembourg) Handball Esch; (Estonia) Põlva Serviti	(Turkey) Beykoz BLD SK; (Italy) SSV Bozen Loacker Volksbank; (Moldova) HC Olimpus-85 USEFS; (Montenegro) RK Partizan 1949 Tivat; (Lithuania) Klaipėda Dragūnas; (Czech Republic) Talent Robstav M.A.T. Plzeň; (Iceland) Afturelding; (Serbia) HC Dinamo Pančevo; (Greece) AC Doukas; (North Macedonia) HC Ohrid 2013; (Switzerland) HC Kriens-Luzern; (Croatia) HRK Gorica; (Norway) ØIF Arendal; (Iceland) Fimleikafélag Hafnarfjarðar; (Austria) Bregenz Handball

The first legs were played on 1–3 and 8–9 September and the second legs were played on 2-3 and 9–10 September 2017.

Team 1	Agg.	Team 2	1st leg	2nd leg
AC Doukas (Greece)	37–59	(Serbia) **Vojvodina**	13–33	24–26
KH BESA Farm Gas (Kosovo)	52–56	(Turkey) **Beykoz BLD SK**	29–21	23–35
Klaipėda Dragūnas (Lithuania)	71–72	(Croatia) **RK Dubrava**	36–36	35–36
HC Dukla Praha (Czech Republic)	52–61	(Iceland) **Fimleikafélag Hafnarfjarðar**	27–30	25–31
**Talent Robstav M.A.T. Plzeň** (Czech Republic)	50–39^{1}	(Greece) Olympiacos SFP	21–21	29–17
RK Partizan 1949 Tivat (Montenegro)	39–70^{2}	(Belgium) **Achilles Bocholt**	19–38	20–32
**Valur FC** (Iceland)	64–58	(Italy) SSV Bozen Loacker Volksbank	34–27	30–31
**SL Benfica** (Portugal)	74–48^{3}	(Serbia) HC Dinamo Pančevo	39–20	35–28
**HC Ohrid 2013** (North Macedonia)	48–47^{4}	(Netherlands) KRAS/Volendam	24–24	24–23
**HC Kriens-Luzern** (Switzerland)	45–43	(Ukraine) ZTR Zaporizhia	24–20	21–23
HC Olimpus-85 USEFS (Moldova)	48–84^{5}	(Israel) **Maccabi Srugo Rishon LeZion**	20–39	28–45
Afturelding (Iceland)	52–55	(Norway) **BSK Handball Elite**	25–26	27–29
Handball Esch (Luxembourg)	50–57^{6}	(Norway) **ØIF Arendal**	24–29	25–28
**SG INSIGNIS Handball Westwien** (Austria)	57–55	(Austria) Bregenz Handball	30–28	27–27
HRK Gorica (Croatia)	43–46	(Estonia) **Põlva Serviti**	21–21	22–25

Notes

^{1} Both legs were hosted by Talent Robstav M.A.T. Plzeň.
^{2} Both legs were hosted by RK Partizan 1949 Tivat.
^{3} Both legs were hosted by SL Benfica.
^{4} Both legs were hosted by HC Ohrid 2013.
^{5} Both legs were hosted by Maccabi Srugo Rishon LeZion.
^{6} Both legs were hosted by Handball Esch.

=== Round 2 ===
Team 1	Agg.	Team 2	1st leg	2nd leg
HC Kriens-Luzern (Switzerland)	32–65	(Denmark) **TTH Holstebro**	16–27	16–38
Achilles Bocholt (Belgium)	65–72	(Finland) **Riihimäki Cocks**	40–35	25–37
Beykoz BLD SK (Turkey)	48–71	(Sweden) **HK Malmö**	27–36	21–35
RK Ohrid 2013 (North Macedonia)	46–81^{1}	(Portugal) **FC Porto**	20–37	26–44
**HC Dobrogea Sud Constanța** (Romania)	51–46^{2}	(Norway) Bækkelagets SK	24–22	27–24
Põlva Serviti (Estonia)	46–59	(Croatia) **RK Nexe Našice**	25–27	21–32
Limburg Lions (Netherlands)	51–57	(Norway) **ØIF Arendal**	25–28	26–29
**Fimleikafélag Hafnarfjarðar** (Iceland)	59–59	(Russia) St. Petersburg HC	32–27	27–32 (p)^{3}
**Pfadi Winterthur** (Switzerland)	61–39^{4}	(Serbia) RK Vojvodina	35–22	26–17
**Helvetia Anaitasuna** (Spain)	70–49	(Czech Republic) Talent Robstav M.A.T. Plzeň	40–26	30–23
SG Handball West Wien (Austria)	49–59	(Switzerland) **Wacker Thun**	22–27	27–32
**Balatonfüredi KSE** (Hungary)	55–41^{5}	(Iceland) Valur FC	27–22	28–19
CSM București (Romania)	56–63	(Belarus) **SKA Minsk**	26–30	30–33
SL Benfica (Portugal)	49–50	(Poland) **Gwardia Opole**	28–24	21–26
Maccabi Srugo Rishon Lezion (Israel)	51–60	(France) **Chambery Savoie Mont Blanc**	24–29	27–31
Csurgói KK (Hungary)	59–60	(Croatia) **RK Dubrava**	33–24	26–36

Notes

^{1} Both legs were hosted by FC Porto.
^{2} Both legs were hosted by HC Dobrogea Sud Constanța.
^{3} A special penalty shoot-out was hosted by St. Petersburg HC due to refereeing mistakes. FH won 4-3.
^{4} Both legs were hosted by Pfadi Winterthur.
^{5} Both legs were hosted by Balatonfüredi KSE.

=== Round 3 ===
Team 1	Agg.	Team 2	1st leg	2nd leg
CYEB Budakalász (Hungary)	48–61	(Spain) **Helvetia Anaitasuna**	27–35	21–26
**KS Azoty-Puławy** (Poland)	59–59 (a)	(Denmark) TTH Holstebro	30–27	29–32
**SC Magdeburg** (Germany)	53–52	(Romania) HC Dobrogea Sud Constanța	27–25	26–27
FC Porto (Portugal)	52–63	(Germany) **Füchse Berlin**	27–30	25–33
Gwardia Opole (Poland)	51–52	(Slovenia) **RD Koper 2013**	30–25	21–27
**Frisch Auf Göppingen** (Germany)	58–48	(Norway) ØIF Arendal	27–27	31–21
**Riihimäki Cocks** (Finland)	49–46	(Slovenia) RD Riko Ribnica	24–17	25–29
**Wacker Thun** (Switzerland)	40–40 (a)	(Austria) Alpla HC Hard	19–17	21–23
Grundfos Tatabánya KC (Hungary)	46–47	(France) **Chambery Savoie Mont Blanc**	25–24	21–23
**Fraikin Granollers** (Spain)	55–46	(Hungary) Balatonfüredi KSE	28–21	27–25
**Lugi HF** (Sweden)	51–46	(Switzerland) Pfadi Winterthur	29–29	22–17
HK Malmö (Sweden)	50–59	(Denmark) **Bjerringbro-Silkeborg**	25–23	25–36
Ribe-Esbjerg HH (Denmark)	50–52	(Croatia) **RK Nexe Našice**	29–26	21–26
**Saint-Raphaël Var Handball** (France)	81–60	(Croatia) RK Dubrava	40–29	41–31
**SKA Minsk** (Belarus)	66–63	(Spain) BM Logroño La Rioja	36–28	30–35
**Tatran Prešov** (Slovakia)	47–47 (a)	(Iceland) Fimleikafélag Hafnarfjarðar	24–21	23–26

== Group stage ==
Location of teams of the 2017–18 EHF Cup group stage.
Red: Group A; Blue: Group B; Green: Group C; Yellow: Group D.

=== Draw and format ===
The draw of the EHF Cup group stage took place on Thursday, 30 November 2017. The 16 teams allocated into four pots were drawn into four groups of four teams.

In each group, teams play against each other home-and-away in a round-robin format. The matchdays are 10–11 February, 17–18 February, 24–25 February, 3–4 March, 24–25 March, and 31 March–1 April 2018.

If two or more teams are equal on points on completion of the group matches, the following criteria are applied to determine the rankings (in descending order):

1. number of points in matches of all teams directly involved;
2. goal difference in matches of all teams directly involved;
3. higher number of plus goals in matches of all teams directly involved;
4. goal difference in all matches of the group;
5. higher number of plus goals in all matches of the group;

If no ranking can be determined, a decision shall be obtained by drawing lots. Lots shall be drawn by the EHF, if possible in the presence of a responsible of each club.

=== Seeding ===
On 27 November 2017, EHF announced the composition of the group stage seeding pots:

Pot 1	Pot 2	Pot 3	Pot 4
(Belarus) SKA Minsk (France) Chambéry Savoie (Germany) Füchse Berlin (Germany) Frisch Auf Göppingen	(Denmark) Bjerringbro-Silkeborg (Spain) Helvetia Anaitasuna (Finland) Riihimäki Cocks (Poland) KS Azoty-Puławy	(Croatia) RK Nexe Našice (Spain) Fraikin Granollers (France) Saint-Raphaël (Germany) SC Magdeburg	(Slovenia) RD Koper 2013 (Switzerland) Wacker Thun (Sweden) Lugi HF (Slovakia) Tatran Prešov

=== Group A ===
Team	Pld	W	D	L	GF	GA	GD	Pts	MAG	BJE	MIN	PRE
(Germany) SC Magdeburg	6	5	0	1	192	157	+35	10	—	33–26	35–30	36–24
(Denmark) Bjerringbro-Silkeborg	6	3	0	3	166	167	−1	6	27–26	—	32–30	27–19
(Belarus) SKA Minsk	6	2	1	3	177	178	−1	5	31–33	27–26	—	34–27
(Slovakia) Tatran Prešov	6	1	1	4	146	179	−33	3	19–29	32–28	25–25	—

=== Group B ===
Team	Pld	W	D	L	GF	GA	GD	Pts	FCH	SRH	ANA	LUG
(Germany) Füchse Berlin	6	5	0	1	185	154	+31	10	—	21–26	34–23	34–25
(France) Saint-Raphaël	6	5	0	1	183	165	+18	10	25–34	—	36–27	28–26
(Spain) Helvetia Anaitasuna	6	2	0	4	174	201	−27	4	28–30	29–38	—	34–32
(Sweden) Lugi HF	6	0	0	6	169	191	−22	0	27–32	28–30	31–33	—

=== Group C ===
Team	Pld	W	D	L	GF	GA	GD	Pts	GÖP	NEX	KOP	RCO
(Germany) Frisch Auf Göppingen	6	6	0	0	177	144	+33	12	—	30–27	31–26	33–27
(Croatia) RK Nexe Našice	6	4	0	2	164	152	+12	8	24–27	—	29–24	31–24
(Slovenia) RD Koper 2013	6	1	0	5	152	168	−16	2	20–25	27–31	—	23–25
(Finland) Riihimäki Cocks	6	1	0	5	143	172	−29	2	20–31	20–22	27–32	—

=== Group D ===
Team	Pld	W	D	L	GF	GA	GD	Pts	GRA	CHA	AZO	THU
(Spain) Fraikin Granollers	6	4	1	1	175	157	+18	9	—	28–21	32–26	25–24
(France) Chambéry Savoie	6	4	1	1	162	152	+10	9	30–30	—	28–22	27–22
(Poland) KS Azoty-Puławy	6	2	0	4	168	179	−11	4	30–37	25–27	—	31–29
(Switzerland) Wacker Thun	6	1	0	5	152	169	−17	2	26–23	25–29	26–34	—

=== Ranking of the second-placed teams ===
Because the German side SC Magdeburg, the organizers of the Final 4 tournament, finished on top of their group they qualified directly to the final tournament and only the top three second-placed teams qualified to the quarter-finals. The ranking of the second-placed teams was determined on the basis of the team's results in the group stage.

Grp	Team	Pld	W	D	L	GF	GA	GD	Pts
B	(France) Saint-Raphaël	6	5	0	1	183	165	+18	10
D	(France) Chambéry Savoie	6	4	1	1	162	152	+10	9
C	(Croatia) RK Nexe Našice	6	4	0	2	164	152	+12	8
A	(Denmark) Bjerringbro-Silkeborg	6	3	0	3	166	167	−1	6

== Knockout stage ==
=== Quarter-finals ===
The draw for the quarter-final pairing was held on Tuesday 3 April at 11:00 hrs in the EHF headquarters in Vienna. The first leg was scheduled for 21 and 22 April and the second leg followed one week later.

Pot 1
(Germany) Frisch Auf Göppingen
(Spain) Fraikin Granollers
(Germany) Füchse Berlin

Pot 2
(Croatia) RK Nexe Našice
(France) Chambéry Savoie
(France) Saint-Raphaël

Team 1	Agg.	Team 2	1st leg	2nd leg
Saint-Raphaël (France)	67–63	(Spain) Fraikin Granollers	37–23	30–40
RK Nexe Našice (Croatia)	44–45	(Germany) Füchse Berlin	28–20	16–25
Chambéry Savoie (France)	54–61	(Germany) Frisch Auf Göppingen	27–30	27–31

==== Matches ====
21 April; 20:45	Saint-Raphaël (France)	37–23	(Spain) Fraikin Granollers	Palais des Sports J.F. Krakowski, Saint-Raphaël, Var; Attendance: 1,462; Referees: Schulze, Tönnies (GER)
21 April; 20:45	Caucheteux, Dipanda 7	(17—10)	Coloma 7	Palais des Sports J.F. Krakowski, Saint-Raphaël, Var; Attendance: 1,462; Referees: Schulze, Tönnies (GER)
21 April; 20:45	3× (yellow card) 5× (suspension)	Report	2× (yellow card) 2× (suspension)	Palais des Sports J.F. Krakowski, Saint-Raphaël, Var; Attendance: 1,462; Referees: Schulze, Tönnies (GER)

29 April; 20:00	Fraikin Granollers (Spain)	40–30	(France) Saint-Raphaël	Palau d'Esports de Granollers, Granollers; Attendance: 1,800; Referees: Kouz, Zhoba (UKR)
29 April; 20:00	Resina 9	(16–15)	Karalek 7	Palau d'Esports de Granollers, Granollers; Attendance: 1,800; Referees: Kouz, Zhoba (UKR)
29 April; 20:00	3× (yellow card) 2× (suspension)	Report	2× (yellow card) 7× (suspension) 1× (red card)	Palau d'Esports de Granollers, Granollers; Attendance: 1,800; Referees: Kouz, Zhoba (UKR)

Saint-Raphaël won 67–63 on aggregate.

21 April; 19:00	RK Nexe Našice (Croatia)	28–20	(Germany) Füchse Berlin	Sportska Dvorana Kralja Tomislava, Našice; Attendance: 2,000; Referees: Horváth. Marton (HUN)
21 April; 19:00	Barišić - Jaman 8	(12–9)	Lindberg, Wiede 5	Sportska Dvorana Kralja Tomislava, Našice; Attendance: 2,000; Referees: Horváth. Marton (HUN)
21 April; 19:00	3× (yellow card) 7× (suspension)	Report	2× (yellow card) 4× (suspension)	Sportska Dvorana Kralja Tomislava, Našice; Attendance: 2,000; Referees: Horváth. Marton (HUN)

28 April; 19:00	Füchse Berlin (Germany)	25–16	(Croatia) RK Nexe Našice	Max-Schmeling-Halle, Berlin; Attendance: 5,000; Referees: Madsen, Mortensen (DEN)
28 April; 19:00	Wiede 6	(14–9)	Zrnić 7	Max-Schmeling-Halle, Berlin; Attendance: 5,000; Referees: Madsen, Mortensen (DEN)
28 April; 19:00	3× (yellow card) 3× (suspension)	Report	3× (yellow card) 7× (suspension) 1× (red card)	Max-Schmeling-Halle, Berlin; Attendance: 5,000; Referees: Madsen, Mortensen (DEN)

Füchse Berlin won 45–44 on aggregate.

22 April; 17:00	Chambéry Savoie (France)	27–30	(Germany) Frisch Auf Göppingen	Le Phare (Chambéry), Chambéry; Attendance: 2,647; Referees: Santos, Fonseca (POR)
22 April; 17:00	Melić, Minel 6	(11–19)	Fontaine, Schiller 6	Le Phare (Chambéry), Chambéry; Attendance: 2,647; Referees: Santos, Fonseca (POR)
22 April; 17:00	3× (yellow card) 4× (suspension)	Report	1× (yellow card) 2× (suspension)	Le Phare (Chambéry), Chambéry; Attendance: 2,647; Referees: Santos, Fonseca (POR)

29 April; 17:30	Frisch Auf Göppingen (Germany)	31–27	(France) Chambéry Savoie	EWS Arena, Göppingen; Attendance: 2,900; Referees: Schulze, Tönnies (GER)
29 April; 17:30	Fontaine, Schiller 5	(18–13)	Minel 7	EWS Arena, Göppingen; Attendance: 2,900; Referees: Schulze, Tönnies (GER)
29 April; 17:30	3× (yellow card) 2× (suspension)	Report	3× (yellow card) 3× (suspension) 2× (red card)	EWS Arena, Göppingen; Attendance: 2,900; Referees: Schulze, Tönnies (GER)

Frisch Auf Göppingen won 61–54 on aggregate.

=== Final four ===
The sixth edition of the EHF Cup Finals in 2018 was hosted by SC Magdeburg after the EHF Executive Committee decided to award the hosting rights to the German club at its meeting on 16 December in Hamburg. The tournament took place on 19 and 20 May 2018. The draw was held on 2 May 2018 in Magdeburg, Germany at 11:00.

Semifinals
19 May
(France) Saint-Raphaël	28
(Germany) SC Magdeburg	27
19 May
(Germany) Frisch Auf Göppingen	24
(Germany) Füchse Berlin	27

Final
20 May
(France) Saint-Raphaël	25
(Germany) Füchse Berlin	28
Third place
20 May
(Germany) SC Magdeburg	35
(Germany) Frisch Auf Göppingen	25

=== Semifinals ===
19 May 2018; 14:45	Saint-Raphaël (France)	28–27	(Germany) SC Magdeburg	GETEC Arena, Magdeburg; Attendance: 6,209; Referees: Marín, García (ESP)
19 May 2018; 14:45	Caucheteux 11	(13–13)	Musche 7	GETEC Arena, Magdeburg; Attendance: 6,209; Referees: Marín, García (ESP)
19 May 2018; 14:45	3× (yellow card) 3× (suspension)	Report	1× (yellow card) 2× (suspension)	GETEC Arena, Magdeburg; Attendance: 6,209; Referees: Marín, García (ESP)

19 May 2018; 17:00	Frisch Auf Göppingen (Germany)	24–27	(Germany) Füchse Berlin	GETEC Arena, Magdeburg; Attendance: 6,209; Referees: Brunovský, Čanda (SVK)
19 May 2018; 17:00	Schiller 6	(13–13)	Lindberg 9	GETEC Arena, Magdeburg; Attendance: 6,209; Referees: Brunovský, Čanda (SVK)
19 May 2018; 17:00	2× (yellow card) 6× (suspension)	Report	3× (yellow card) 2× (suspension)	GETEC Arena, Magdeburg; Attendance: 6,209; Referees: Brunovský, Čanda (SVK)

=== Third place game ===
20 May 2018; 12:45	SC Magdeburg (Germany)	35–25	(Germany) Frisch Auf Göppingen	GETEC Arena, Magdeburg; Attendance: 6,209; Referees: Pandžić, Mosorinski (SRB)
20 May 2018; 12:45	Musche 10	(16–15)	four players 4	GETEC Arena, Magdeburg; Attendance: 6,209; Referees: Pandžić, Mosorinski (SRB)
20 May 2018; 12:45	3× (yellow card) 4× (suspension)	Report	3× (yellow card) 2× (suspension)	GETEC Arena, Magdeburg; Attendance: 6,209; Referees: Pandžić, Mosorinski (SRB)

=== Final ===
20 May 2018; 15:15	Saint-Raphaël (France)	25–28	(Germany) Füchse Berlin	GETEC Arena, Magdeburg; Attendance: 6,209; Referees: Olesen, Pedersen (DEN)
20 May 2018; 15:15	Caucheteux 8	(13–14)	Zachrisson 9	GETEC Arena, Magdeburg; Attendance: 6,209; Referees: Olesen, Pedersen (DEN)
20 May 2018; 15:15	4× (yellow card) 5× (suspension) 1× (red card)	Report	2× (yellow card) 7× (suspension)	GETEC Arena, Magdeburg; Attendance: 6,209; Referees: Olesen, Pedersen (DEN)

== Top goalscorers ==
As of 20 May 2018

Rank	Player	Club	Goals
1	(Denmark) Hans Lindberg	(Germany) Füchse Berlin	82
2	(France) Raphaël Caucheteux	(France) Saint-Raphaël	81
3	(Germany) Marcel Schiller	(Germany) Frisch Auf Göppingen	67

== See also ==
- 2017–18 EHF Champions League
- 2017–18 EHF Challenge Cup
- 2017–18 Women's EHF Cup
