= 2012–13 LNH Division 1 =

LNH Division 1
- Season: 2012–13
- Champions: Paris Saint-Germain (1st)
- Matches: 182
- Goals: 9,141 (50.23 per match)
- Top goalscorer: Valero Rivera (158 goals)

2012–13 Ligue Nationale de Handball Division 1 season is the 61st since its establishment. Montpellier were the defending champions, having won their title the previous season.

Paris Saint-Germain won their first ever title.

== Teams ==
Location of teams in 2012–13 LNH Division 1

Club	Arena	Capacity
Aix	Val de l'Arc	2 000
Billère	Palais des Sports	3 391
Cesson-Rennes	Palais des Sports de la Valette	1 400
Chambéry	Le Phare	4 500
Créteil	Palais des Sports Robert Oubron	2 500
Dunkerque	Salle Dewerdt	2 500
Ivry	Gymnase Auguste Delaune	1 500
Montpellier	Arena Montpellier	8 500
Nantes	Palais des Sports de Beaulieu	5 500
Paris	Stade Pierre de Coubertin	4 016
Saint-Raphaël	Palais des Sports Intercommunal	2 000
Sélestat	CSI Séléstat	2 200
Toulouse	Palais des Sports André Brouat	3 751
Tremblay	Palais des sports de Tremblay-en-France	1 200

== Regular season ==
=== Standings ===
#	Team	MP	W	D	L	F	A	Dff	Pts
1	Paris Saint-Germain	26	24	1	1	870	699	171	49
2	US Dunkerque	26	18	3	5	744	672	72	39
3	Montpellier Agglomération Handball	26	17	4	5	857	759	98	38
4	Chambéry Savoie Handball	26	15	4	7	752	723	29	34
5	HBC Nantes	26	15	4	7	732	665	67	34
6	Saint-Raphaël VHB	26	12	3	11	746	745	1	27
7	Cesson Rennes MHB	26	11	4	11	686	710	-24	26
8	Sélestat Alsace HB	26	9	3	14	740	774	-34	21
9	Pays d'Aix UC	26	8	5	13	767	784	-17	21
10	US Ivry	26	9	3	14	657	700	-43	21
11	Fenix Toulouse Handball	26	8	4	14	759	787	-28	20
12	Tremblay-en-France Handball	26	8	2	16	714	717	-3	18
13	US Créteil	26	7	2	17	711	763	-52	16
14	Billère Handball	26	0	0	26	608	845	-237	0

- source:handnews.fr

Champions League
EHF Cup
Relegated

=== Results ===
In the table below the home teams are listed on the left and the away teams along the top.

Club	AIX	BIL	CES	CSH	CRE	DUN	IVRY	MON	NAN	PSG	SRV	SEL	TOU	TRE
Aix-en-Provence		37–29	36–23	30–36	27–27	23–31	32–24	27–27	28–28	27–31	27–29			38–34
Billère	21–30		26–27	28–34	24–26	24–32	24–29	24–50	20–29	18–26		24–38	28–32	24–32
Cesson-Rennes	26–27	35–22		23–31	25–18	27–28	20–20	28–37	27–25	27–32		28–24		28–25
Chambéry	32–30	27–22	29–30			31–27	24–23		30–30	24–28	28–26	35–35	34–24	28–28
Créteil		34–26	25–31	29–29		29–30	20–23	33–35	24–28	28–35	30–31	25–28	36–28	26–24
Dunkerque	27–26	37–22	28–24		27–22		38–22	28–29	28–25	30–36	31–28	24–23	26–26	
Ivry	30–28		25–26	30–21	27–24	22–22		28–32		22–34	29–29	26–25	33–31	25–26
Montpellier	36–32	38–28	35–30	33–22	32–33	26–26	33–29			25–25	29–26	35–29	41–31	40–30
Nantes	34–17	29–17		29–32	29–32	26–28	27–22	29–33		26–24	24–24	33–23	31–26	23–22
Paris	39–33		34–23	36–29	30–28	30–25	27–22	38–24	31–29		33–28	42–27	43–29	
Saint-Raphaël	30–32	31–25	28–30	30–28	32–26		27–24	28–26	24–31	29–35		38–26	32–31	
Sélestat	36–30	32–23	23–23	25–30		25–27		30–30	24–29	29–45	29–32		28–35	28–26
Toulouse	34–34	28–27	29–26	25–29	34–31	32–37	31–22	34–29	23–26		26–22	31–32		27–27
Tremblay-en-France	33–28	29–20	26–18	20–23	22–25	28–25	20–22		24–25	26–27	36–23	28–29	28–25	

== Statistics ==
=== Top scorers ===
Rank	Name	Club	Goals
1	(Spain) Valero Rivera	HBC Nantes	158
2	(France) Matthieu Drouhin	Tremblay-en-France	157
3	(France) Hugo Descat	US Créteil	139
4	(France) Raphaël Caucheteux	Saint Raphaël	125
5	(Spain) Jorge Maqueda	HBC Nantes	120
6	(France) Jérôme Fernandez	Fenix Toulouse Handball	119
7	(France) Nikola Karabatić	Aix-en-Provence	118
8	(Bosnia and Herzegovina) Edin Bašić	Chambéry Savoie Handball	115
9	(Poland) Paweł Podsiadło	Sélestat Alsace Handball	112
9	(France) Quentin Minel	US Créteil	112

=== Top goalkeepers ===
Rank	Name	Club	Saves/Shoots	Percentage
1	(France) Vincent Gérard	US Dunkerque	282 / 757	37.25%
2	(France) Mickaël Robin	Montpellier Agglomération Handball	269 / 770	34.94%
3	(Serbia) Slaviša Đukanović	Saint Raphaël	257 / 688	37.35%
4	(France) Robin Cappelle	Aix-en-Provence	253 / 797	31.74%
5	(France) Cyril Dumoulin	Chambéry Savoie Handball	240 / 646	37.15%
6	(Spain) José Manuel Sierra	PSG Handball	233 / 625	37.28%
7	(France) Yann Genty	Cesson Rennes MHB	208 / 573	36.30%
8	(Hungary) László Fülöp	Sélestat Alsace Handball	196 / 586	33.45%
9	(France) François-Xavier Chapon	US Ivry	179 / 554	32.31%
10	(France) Arnaud Siffert	HBC Nantes	170 / 512	33.20%
