= Daniel Sarmiento Melián =

Spanish handball player (born 1983)

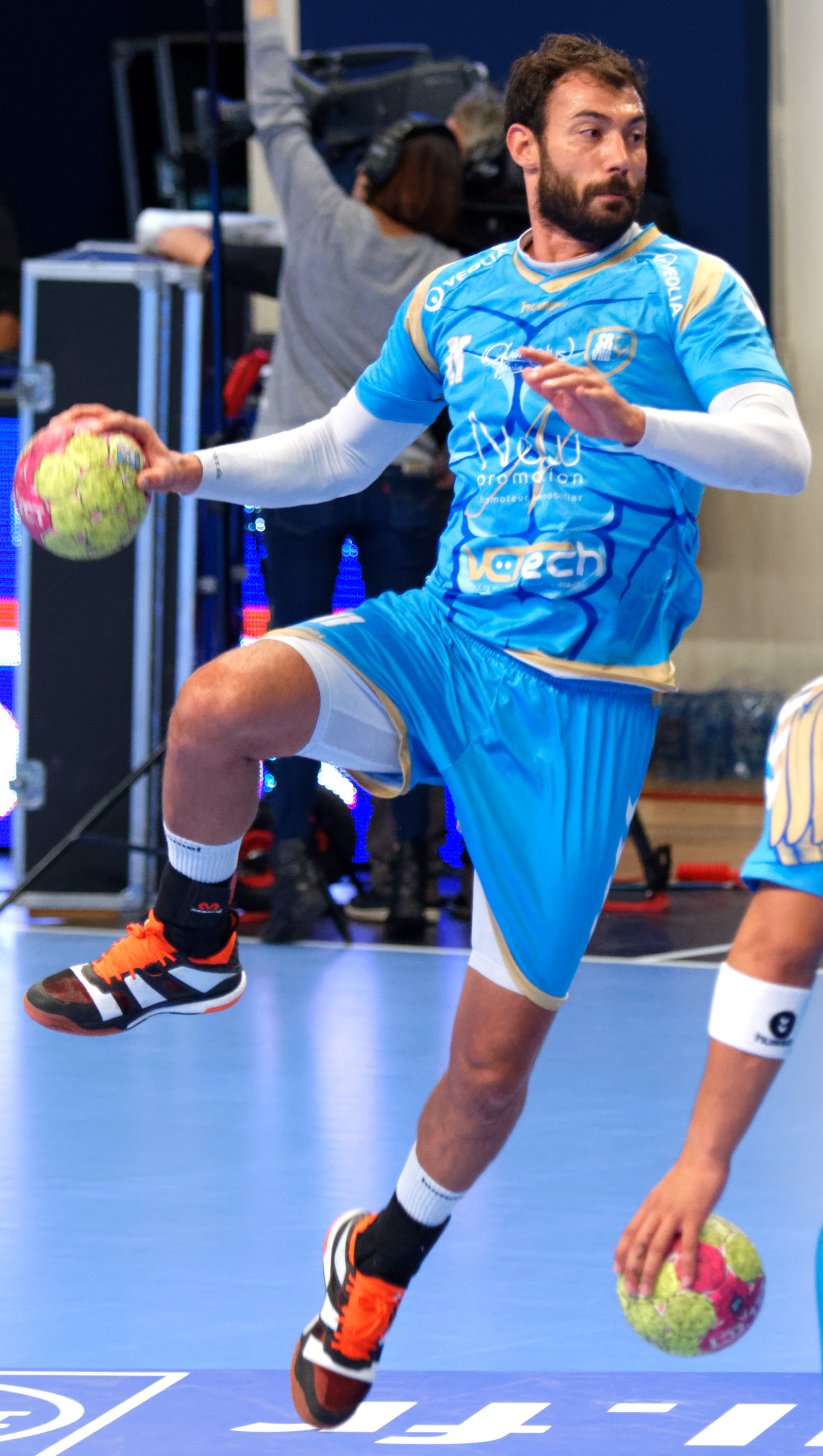
- Sarmiento in 2017

Personal information
- Nationality: Spanish
- Born: 25 August 1983 (age 43) Las Palmas, Spain
- Height: 1.88 m (6 ft 2 in)

Sport
- Sport: Handball
- Position: Centre back
- Current club: Wisła Płock

Youth career
- Years: Team
- –: Las Palmas GC

Senior clubs
- Years: Team
- 2000–2003: Gáldar
- 2003–2007: Ciudad de Almería
- 2007–2009: Ademar León
- 2009–2016: FC Barcelona
- 2016–2022: Saint-Raphaël
- 2022: Wisła Płock
- 2024–: Gáldar
National team
Years	Team	Apps	(Gls)
2007–2022	Spain	147	(283)
Medal record
Olympic Games
Bronze medal – third place	2020 Tokyo	Team
World Championship
Gold medal – first place	2013 Spain
Bronze medal – third place	2021 Egypt
European Championship
Gold medal – first place	2018 Croatia
Gold medal – first place	2020 Sweden/Austria/Norway
Silver medal – second place	2022 Hungary/Slovakia
Bronze medal – third place	2014 Denmark

Daniel Sarmiento Melián (born 25 August 1983) is a Spanish retired handballer, who last played for Wisła Płock and the Spanish national team.

He was part of the Spanish team that won the world title on home soil in 2013.

== Career ==
Sarmiento started playing handball at his home town club. He later joined the biggest club on Gran Canaria, BM Gáldar, where he debuted in the Liga ASOBAL. In 2003, he joined Ciudad de Almería, after Gáldar had to declare bankruptcy. After four years, he joined Ademar León in 2007 to replace Claus Møller Jakobsen.

In 2009, he joined FC Barcelona. Here, he won the league title 6 times in a row from 2011 to 2016, as well as the EHF Champions League in 2010-11 and 2014-15.

In 2016, he joined French side Saint-Raphaël Var Handball. After 6 years in France, he retired from professional handball.

In August 2022, he unretired to join Polish team Wisła Płock to replace Niko Mindegía and Gergő Fazekas, who had left the club. He stayed until the end of the year.

In 2024, he unretired for a second time to join Desatascos Jumbo Gáldar in the third tier of Spanish handball.

=== National team ===
In 2013, he won the 2013 World Championship at home. A year later, he won bronze medals at the 2014 European Championship in Denmark. At the 2018 and 2020 European Championships, he won gold medals with the Spanish team. At the 2020 Olympics in Tokyo, he won bronze medals with the Spanish team. At the 2022 European Championship, he won silver medals, playing 4 out of 9 games. Spain lost to Sweden in the final.
