= Chema Márquez =

Spanish handball player (born 1996)

Personal information
- Full name: José María Márquez Coloma
- Nationality: Spanish
- Born: 20 December 1996 (age 29) Madrid, Spain
- Height: 1.987 m (6 ft 6.2 in)

Sport
- Sport: Handball
- Position: Centre back, left back
- Current club: Saint-Raphaël Var Handball
- Number: 9

Youth career
- Years: Team
- –: BM Alcobendas

Senior clubs
- Years: Team
- 2014–2020: Quabit Guadalajara
- 2020–2022: Fraikin BM Granollers
- 2022–: Saint-Raphaël Var Handball
National team
Years	Team	Apps	(Gls)
2017–	Spain	23	(46)
Medal record
European Championship
Silver medal – second place	2022 Hungary/Slovakia
Mediterranean Games
Gold medal – first place	2022 Mediterranean Games
- Updated on 27 February 2024

José María Márquez Coloma, better known as Chema Márquez (born 20 December 1996) is a Spanish handball player for the French club Saint-Raphaël Var Handball and the Spanish national team. In 2022, he won silver medals at the European Championship with the Spanish team.

== Career ==
Chema Márquez started his career at Quabit Guadalajara. In 2016–17 and 2017–18 seasons he was back-to-back top scorer in the Spanish Liga ASOBAL with 200 and 196 goals respectively.

In 2020 he joined league rivals Fraikin BM Granollers. In the 2021–22 season he once again became the league top scorer. He finished 2nd that season, behind FC Barcelona.

In 2022 he joined French team Saint-Raphaël Var Handball. In 2023 he prolonged his contract until 2026.

=== National team ===
Chema Márquez debuted for the Spanish national team on June 14, 2017, against Bosnia-Herzegovina.

Prior to that he had played 37 games for the Spanish youth national team. With them he won the U-20 European Championship in 2016 and U-21 World Championship in 2017.

He won silver medals at the 2022 European Championship with the Spanish team. During the tournament he played 4 games and scored 10 goals. Spain lost the final to Sweden 27:26. At the 2022 Mediterranean Games he won gold medals with the Spanish team.

== Private life ==
His older brother, Alejandro Márquez Coloma, also plays handball. His father, Ricardo, was also a handballer.
