= 2016–17 Superliga (men's handball) =

Polish Superliga
- Season: 2016–17
- Dates: 9 September 2016 – 27 May 2017
- Champions: Vive Tauron Kielce (14th title)
- Champions League: Vive Tauron Kielce; Orlen Wisła Płock
- EHF Cup: Azoty Puławy; Gwardia Opole
- Matches played: 224
- Goals scored: 12,255 (54.71 per match)
- Top goalscorer: Vitaliy Titov (175 goals)

The 2016–17 Superliga was the 61st season of the Polish Superliga, the top men's handball league in Poland. A total of fourteen teams contested this season's league, which began on 9 September 2016 and concluded on 27 May 2017.

Vive Tauron Kielce won their 14th title of the Polish Champions.

== Format ==
The competition format for the 2016–17 season consisted of 2 groups of seven teams each playing a total of 26 matches, half at home and half away, with the top 3 teams of each group qualifying directly for the quarterfinals. The teams ranked 4th and 5th play for a place in the quarterfinals.

== Regular season ==
- A victory over a team of the same group add 1 extra point.

=== Grenade Group ===
Pos	Team	Pld	W	OTW	OTL	L	GF	GA	GD	Pts	Qualification
1	Vive Tauron Kielce	26	26	0	0	0	848	634	+214	64	Quarterfinals
2	MMTS Kwidzyn	26	17	0	1	8	705	690	+15	43	Quarterfinals
3	Wybrzeże Gdańsk	26	13	0	0	13	682	721	−39	32	Quarterfinals
4	Chrobry Głogów	26	12	0	0	14	697	745	−48	30	Playoffs; First round
5	Sandra SPA Pogoń Szczecin	26	9	0	0	17	686	771	−85	22	Playoffs; First round
6	KPR Legionowo	26	7	0	1	18	661	720	−59	19	
7	Meble Wójcik Elbląg	26	4	0	0	22	570	689	−119	10	

Source: PGNiG Superliga

EP
12
8
6
6
4
4
2

=== Orange Group ===
Pos	Team	Pld	W	OTW	OTL	L	GF	GA	GD	Pts	Qualification
1	Orlen Wisła Płock	26	23	0	0	3	856	607	+249	57	Quarterfinals
2	Azoty Puławy	26	20	0	1	5	801	701	+100	50	Quarterfinals
3	Gwardia Opole	26	16	0	0	10	712	722	−10	40	Quarterfinals
4	NMC Górnik Zabrze	26	16	0	0	10	772	715	+57	39	Playoffs; First round
5	Stal Mielec	26	8	0	0	18	633	741	−108	18	Playoffs; First round
6	Zagłębie Lubin	26	6	0	0	20	685	747	−62	15	
7	Piotrkowianin Piotrków Trybunalski	26	5	0	1	20	667	772	−105	13	

Source: PGNiG Superliga

EP
11
9
8
7
2
3
2

=== Results ===
Home \ Away	AZO	GLO	ZAB	OPO	LEG	ELB	KWI	PLO	PIO	SZC	MIE	KIE	GDA	LUB
Azoty Puławy		29–24	34–26	27–23	31–26	31–21	33–21	25–29	34–24	34–25	29–22	32–40	29–32	36–23
Chrobry Głogów	25–26		29–26	23–28	29–23	28–23	22–28	25–32	34–28	29–24	18–21	24–39	33–28	31–28
NMC Górnik Zabrze	36–34	41–27		30–32	31–27	24–13	28–29	26–29	32–25	37–26	27–21	27–36	30–28	31–23
Gwardia Opole	24–30	23–29	29–27		25–23	24–21	23–28	21–39	34–24	30–29	33–27	24–33	27–24	34–29
KPR Legionowo	27–30	31–26	27–28	25–26		28–25	21–29	23–33	30–33	35–25	31–23	24–32	25–27	26–25
Meble Wójcik Elbląg	26–31	20–30	26–27	23–20	23–24		21–23	24–29	16–14	22–18	20–21	20–26	25–29	29–33
MMTS Kwidzyn	27–29	29–26	25–23	27–20	23–20	25–28		19–35	29–25	37–31	25–26	27–32	31–23	29–25
Orlen Wisła Płock	29–24	37–20	33–21	38–28	26–17	36–22	39–37		35–24	41–22	37–18	18–23	39–27	35–16
Piotrkowianin Piotrków Trybunalski	29–31	33–34	29–36	34–39	29–26	28–23	29–30	26–25		25–28	23–25	19–30	25–28	35–16
Sandra SPA Pogoń Szczecin	23–33	28–22	25–33	25–30	25–23	32–24	28–25	22–33	28–22		39–29	27–35	26–27	30–28
Stal Mielec	29–33	30–27	27–32	23–31	24–30	21–18	22–28	20–34	31–25	32–25		23–35	25–27	24–27
Vive Tauron Kielce	39–38	36–24	33–29	34–23	32–26	36–21	35–24	26–23	31–21	29–23	35–23		33–25	28–22
Wybrzeże Gdańsk	23–28	26–28	25–33	24–33	26–20	22–17	22–25	25–36	31–20	30–25	24–23	19–31		33–28
Zagłębie Lubin	28–30	28–30	23–31	26–28	34–23	29–19	24–25	26–36	24–26	26–27	28–23	28–29	26–27	

Source: PGNiG Superliga
Legend: Blue = home team win; Red = away team win.

== Playoffs ==
=== First round ===
Team 1	Agg.	Team 2	1st leg	2nd leg
Sandra SPA Pogoń Szczecin	51–60	Chrobry Głogów	33–30	18–30
Stal Mielec	54–62	NMC Górnik Zabrze	27–28	27–34

=== Final round ===
Quarterfinals
G1	Vive Tauron Kielce	33	32	2
O4	NMC Górnik Zabrze	23	19	0
O3	Gwardia Opole	24	25	49
G2	MMTS Kwidzyn	29	22	51
O2	Azoty Puławy	27	28	2
G3	Wybrzeże Gdańsk	24	21	0
G4	Chrobry Głogów	21	21	0
O1	Orlen Wisła Płock	29	30	2

Semifinals
G1	Vive Tauron Kielce	24	31	2
G2	MMTS Kwidzyn	19	26	0
O2	Azoty Puławy	26	24	0
O1	Orlen Wisła Płock	29	33	2

Finals
G1	Vive Tauron Kielce	25	31	2
O1	Orlen Wisła Płock	24	29	0
Third place
G2	MMTS Kwidzyn	24	20	44
O2	Azoty Puławy	18	30	48

== Final standings ==
Qualified for the 2017–18 EHF Champions League
Qualified for the 2017–18 EHF Cup

Rank	Team
1	Vive Tauron Kielce
2	Orlen Wisła Płock
3	Azoty Puławy
4	MMTS Kwidzyn
5	NMC Górnik Zabrze
6	Wybrzeże Gdańsk
7	Chrobry Głogów
8	Gwardia Opole
9	Sandra SPA Pogoń Szczecin
10	Zagłębie Lubin
11	KPR Legionowo
12	Piotrkowianin Piotrków Trybunalski
13	Meble Wójcik Elbląg
14	Stal Mielec
