= Alexander Lynggaard =

Danish handball player (born 1990)

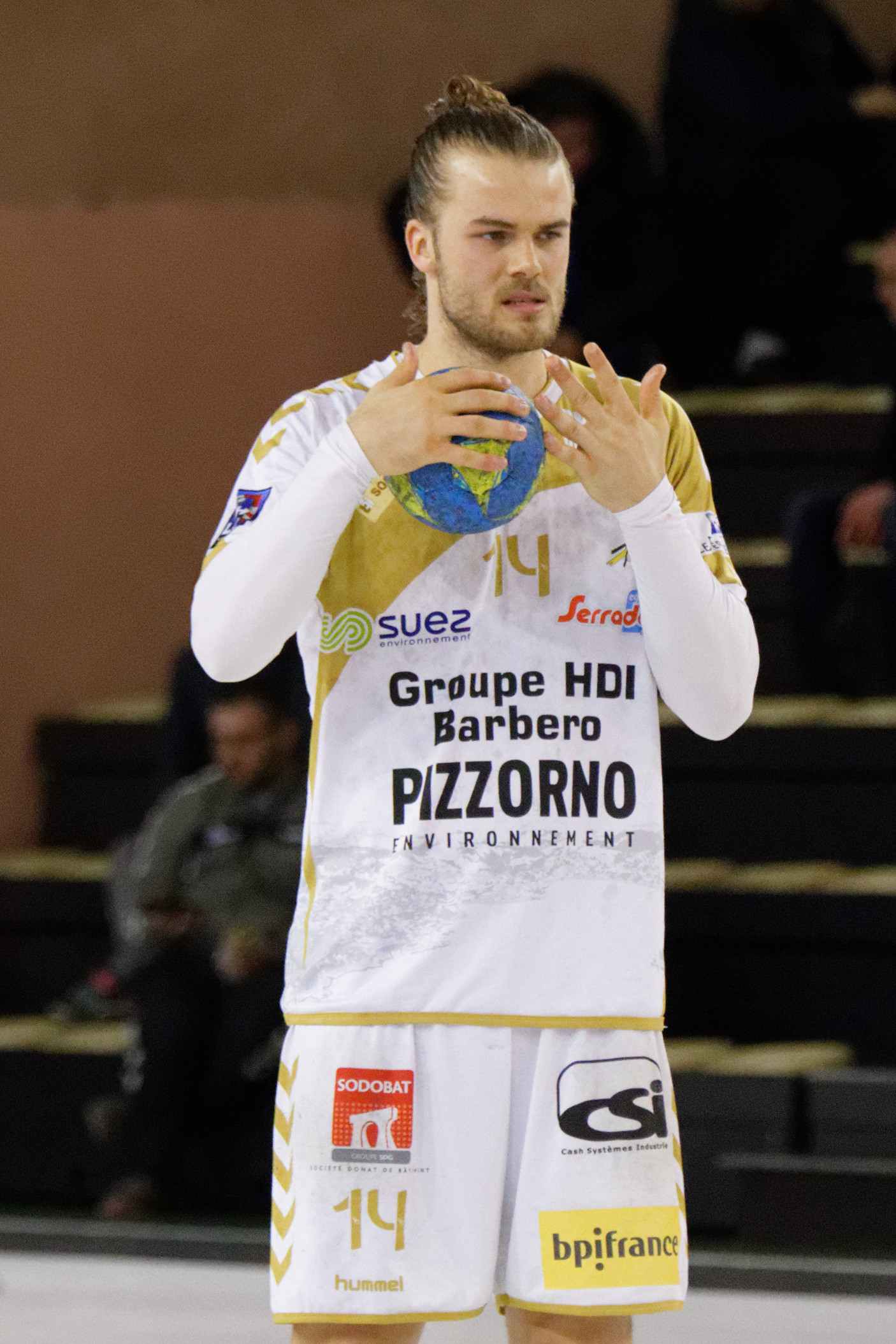
- March 23, 2016

Personal information
- Nationality: Danish
- Born: 27 March 1990 (age 36) Køge, Denmark
- Height: 2.00 m (6 ft 7 in)

Sport
- Sport: Handball
- Position: Pivot
- Current club: Bjerringbro-Silkeborg Håndbold
- Number: 14

Youth career
- Years: Team
- -2007: Frederiksberg IF

Senior clubs
- Years: Team
- 2007-2010: FCK Håndbold
- 2010-2013: Nordsjælland Håndbold
- 2013-2020: Saint-Raphaël Var HB
- 2020-: Bjerringbro-Silkeborg Håndbold
National team
Years	Team	Apps	(Gls)
2015-	Denmark	31	(26)
- Updated on 13 February 2026

Alexander Lynggaard (born 27 March 1990) is a Danish handball player. He plays for Bjerringbro-Silkeborg Håndbold and the Danish national team.

He has previously played for FCK Håndbold and Nordsjælland Håndbold in Denmark and Saint-Raphaël Var HB in France. With FCK he won the Danish Championship in 2007–10.

He debuted for the Danish national team on 20 June 2015 against Poland. He competed at the 2016 European Men's Handball Championship, where Denmark finished 6th.
