= Adrien Dipanda =

French handball player (born 1988)

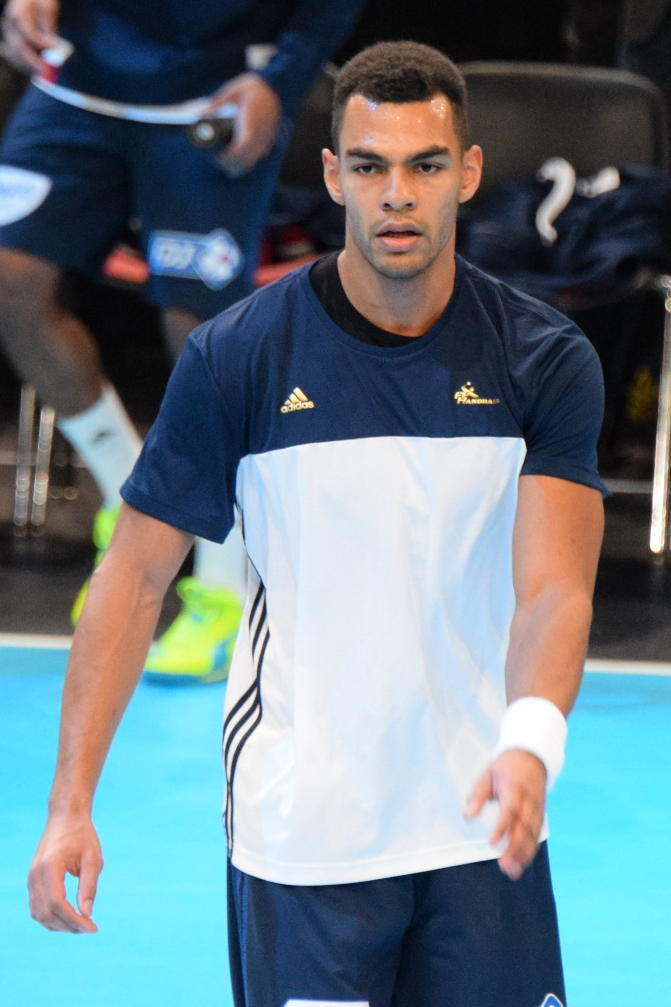
- Dipanda in 2016

Personal information
- Nationality: French
- Born: 3 May 1988 (age 38) Dijon, France
- Height: 2.02 m (6 ft 8 in)

Sport
- Sport: Handball
- Position: Right back
- Current club: Retired

Senior clubs
- Years: Team
- 2006–2011: Montpellier Handball
- 2011–2012: CB Ademar León
- 2012–2024: Saint-Raphaël VHB
National team
Years	Team	Apps	(Gls)
2015–2021	France	77	(91)
Medal record
Olympic Games
Silver medal – second place	2016 Rio de Janeiro	Team
World Championship
Gold medal – first place	2017 France
Bronze medal – third place	2019 Germany/Denmark
European Championship
Bronze medal – third place	2018 Croatia
Mediterranean Games
Silver medal – second place	2009 Pescara	Team

Adrien Dipanda (born 3 May 1988) is a French former handball player. He retired after the 2023/2024 season after 12 seasons Saint-Raphaël. He also featured in the French national team.

He also played for Montpellier Handball until 2011, where he won the French Championship four times. In 2011 he joined Spanish side CB Ademar León. A year later he returned to France to join Saint-Raphaël, where he played the rest of his career.

He participated in the 2016 European Men's Handball Championship and 2016 Olympics, where France won silver medals.

He won the 2017 World Men's Handball Championship with the French team.
