= 2016–17 Belarusian Men's Handball Championship =

The 2016/2017 season was the 25th season of The Belarusian Men's Handball Championship.

== First stage ==
Teams were divided into 2 groups:

- Group 1: SKA Minsk, GK Gomel, Kronon Grodno, Masheka Mogilev, Meshkov Brest 2
- Group 2: RCOR-2000, SKA-RGUOR, GK Gomel 2, Kronon Grodno 2, Vityaz-BSEU Minsk

=== Results ===
Group 1

Pos	Team	1	2	3	4	5	GD	P
1	SKA Minsk	X	32:25; 30:29; 32:31; 35:31	46:30; 35:25; 38:27; 32:28	34:25; 33:27; 41:22; 26:25	36:34; 33:25; 40:22; 36:32	559:438	32
2	GK Gomel	25:32; 29:30; 31:32; 31:35	X	32:30; 27:21; 32:35; 22:26	34:27; 37:33; 39:33; 36:27	41:33; 30:25; 39:33; 36:27	515:474	20
3	Kronon Grodno	30:46; 25:35; 27:38; 28:32	30:32; 21:27; 35:32; 26:22	X	34:32; 31:25; 37:26; 26:30	29:29; 28:28; 34:27; 37:32	478:493	16
4*	Meshkov Brest 2	25:34; 27:33; 22:41; 25:26	27:34; 33:37; 28:33; 27:36	32:34; 25:31; 26:37; 30:26	X	31:25; 29:31; 28:32; 31:29	464:538	6
5*	Masheka Mogilev	34:36; 25:33; 22:40; 32:36	33:41; 25:30; 33:39; 27:36	29:29; 28:28; 27:34; 32:37	25:31; 31:29; 32:28; 29:31	X	446:519	6

∗ Meshkov Brest 2 has better goal difference in matches against Masheka Mogilev and therefore stands above

Group 2

Pos	Team	1	2	3	4	5	GD	P
1*	SKA-RGUOR	X	28:31; 31:26; 25:30; 35:28	30:15; 43:21; 43:22; 43:19	46:23; 44:16; 38:29; 48:31	44:19; 36:25; 46:25; 48:31	628:391	28
2*	Vityaz-BSEU Minsk	31:28; 26:31; 30:25; 28:35	X	38:17; 31:24; 38:24; 33:22	41:20; 40:30; 37:23; 39:22	35:20; 36:27; 50:19; 48:27	581:394	28
3	RCOR-2000	15:30; 21:43; 22:43; 19:43	17:38; 24:31; 24:38; 22:33	X	32:38; 34:17; 39:34; 28:29	30:18; 28:24; 34:22	389:481	10
4	GK Gomel 2	23:46; 16:44; 29:38; 31:48	20:41; 30:40; 23:37; 22:39	38:32; 17:34; 34:39; 29:28	X	23:25; 36:34; 22:19; 32:32	425:576	9
5	Kronon Grodno 2	19:44; 25:36; 25:46; 31:48	20:35; 27:36; 19:50; 27:48	18:30; 24:28; 22:34	25:23; 34:36; 19:22; 32:32	X	367:548	3

∗ SKA-RGUOR has better goal difference in matches against Vityaz-BSEU Minsk and therefore stands above

== Second stage (Playoffs) ==
According to the final positions in Group 1 were formed playoffs pairs up as follows:

- 5th place - 2nd place
- 4th place - 3rd place

Winners of the playoffs pairs played at the third stage in the Group A, defeated teams - in the Group B. The playoffs were held up to two wins one of the teams.

=== Results ===
Pair
Masheka Mogilev	1
GK Gomel	2

March 4, 2017
16:00 UTC+3

Masheka Mogilev	30:36	GK Gomel

SC "Olympian", Mogilev
March 11, 2017
14:00 UTC+3

GK Gomel	30:31	Masheka Mogilev

GRCOR, Gomel
March 12, 2017
14:00 UTC+3

GK Gomel	44:31	Masheka Mogilev

GRCOR, Gomel

Pair
Meshkov Brest 2	1
Kronon Grodno	2

March 5, 2017
13:00 UTC+3

Meshkov Brest 2	24:26 (a.e.t.)	Kronon Grodno

Sports Palace "Victoria", Brest
March 11, 2017
15:00 UTC+3

Kronon Grodno	22:23	Meshkov Brest 2

Sports Complex "Victoria", Grodno
March 12, 2017
12:00 UTC+3

Kronon Grodno	34:17	Meshkov Brest 2

Sports Complex "Victoria", Grodno

== Third stage ==
According to the results of the previous stages were formed 3 groups:

- Group A: HC Meshkov Brest, 1st place of Group 1 and winners of playoffs pairs
- Group B: defeated in playoffs and 2 best teams of Group 2
- Group C: rest teams of Group 2

At the end of the stage in Group B were determined the places from 5th to 8th in the championship, in the Group C – the places from 9th to 11th in the championship.

=== Results ===
Group A

Pos	Team	1	2	3	4	GD	P
1	Meshkov Brest	X	29:26; 36:27	40:21; 23:30	32:20; 30:17	190:141	10
2	SKA Minsk	26:29; 27:36	X	31:29; 32:25	38:26; 29:25	183:170	8
3	GK Gomel	21:40; 30:23	29:31; 25:32	X	27:19; 23:15	155:160	6
4	Kronon Grodno	20:32; 17:30	26:38; 25:29	19:27; 15:23	X	122:179	0

Group B

Pos	Team	1	2	3	4	GD	P
5	Masheka Mogilev	X	30:31; 38:29; 26:28; 32:28	35:35; 33:30; 26:30; 32:25	10:0*; 43:39; 45:31; 41:39	391:345	17
6	Vityaz-BSEU Minsk	31:30; 29:38; 28:26; 28:32	X	28:28; 26:26; 33:26; 20:23	10:0*; 35:37; 33:29; 37:31	338:326	14
7	Meshkov Brest 2	35:35; 30:33; 30:26; 25:32	28:28; 26:26; 26:33; 23:20	X	33:35; 29:27; 36:36; 28:28	349:359	11
8	SKA-RGUOR	0:10*; 39:43; 31:45; 39:41	0:10*; 37:35; 29:33; 31:37	35:33; 27:29; 36:36; 28:28	X	332:380	6

∗ SKA-RGUOR got a technical defeat (0:10) in 2 matches (against Masheka Mogilev and Vityaz-BSEU Minsk) for participation of player, which did not have right for this

Group C

Pos	Team	1	2	3	GD	P
9	RCOR-2000	X	32:38; 34:17; 39:34; 28:29; 35:37; 37:31; 40:31; 36:36; 22:29	30:18; 28:24; 34:22; 26:21; 33:25; 33:32; 18:26; 26:25; 25:27	556:502	23
10	GK Gomel 2	38:32; 17:34; 34:39; 29:28; 37:35; 31:37; 31:40; 36:36; 29:22	X	23:25; 36:34; 22:19; 32:32; 38:37; 40:35; 30:34; 31:45; 35:34	569:598	20
11	Kronon Grodno 2	18:30; 24:28; 22:34; 21:26; 25:33; 32:33; 26:18; 25:26; 27:25	25:23; 34:36; 19:22; 32:32; 37:38; 35:40; 34:30; 45:31; 34:35	X	515:540	11

== Fourth stage (Playoffs) ==
According to the final positions in Group A were formed semi-final pairs up as follows:

- 3rd place - 2nd place
- 4th place - 1st place

Winners of the semi-final pairs played in the final round, where competed for the gold and silver medals of the championship. Defeated in semi-finals teams competed for the bronze medals. The semi-finals were held up to two wins one of the teams, the final round - up to three wins.

=== Results ===
Semi-finals
GK Gomel	0
SKA Minsk	2
Kronon Grodno	1
Meshkov Brest	2

Final
SKA Minsk	0
Meshkov Brest	3
Third place
Kronon Grodno	0
GK Gomel	3

Semi-finals

17 May 2017
19:00 UTC+3

GK Gomel	30:32	SKA Minsk

GRCOR, Gomel
20 May 2017
19:00 UTC+3

SKA Minsk	35:25	GK Gomel

Sports Palace "Uruchje", Minsk
17 May 2017
17:00 UTC+3

Kronon Grodno	26:25	Meshkov Brest

Sports Complex "Victoria", Grodno
20 May 2017
16:00 UTC+3

Meshkov Brest	36:14	Kronon Grodno

Sports Palace "Victoria", Brest
21 May 2017
16:00 UTC+3

Meshkov Brest	33:24	Kronon Grodno

Sports Palace "Victoria", Brest

Third place

24 May 2017
17:30 UTC+3

Kronon Grodno	23:29	GK Gomel

Sports Complex "Victoria", Grodno
27 May 2017
17:00 UTC+3

GK Gomel	25:20	Kronon Grodno

GRCOR, Gomel
28 May 2017
18:00 UTC+3

GK Gomel	29:26	Kronon Grodno

GRCOR, Gomel

Final

24 May 2017
19:00 UTC+3

SKA Minsk	31:34 (a.e.t.)	Meshkov Brest

Sports Palace "Uruchje", Minsk
27 May 2017
18:00 UTC+3

Meshkov Brest	31:23	SKA Minsk

Sports Palace "Victoria", Brest
28 May 2017
15:00 UTC+3

Meshkov Brest	35:28	SKA Minsk

Sports Palace "Victoria", Brest

== Results of the season ==
Gold medal	Silver medal	Bronze medal
Meshkov Brest; 9th time	SKA Minsk; 10th time	GK Gomel; 5th time
