= 2016–17 Handball Liga Austria =

Handball Liga Austria
- Season: 2016–17
- Champions: Alpla HC Hard (6th title)
- Top goalscorer: (Austria) Tobias Schopf (127 goals)
- All statistics correct as of 14 May 2017.

The 2016–17 Handball Liga Austria is the 56th season of the Handball Liga Austria, Austrian's top-tier handball league. A total of ten teams contest this season's league, which began on 2 September 2016 and is scheduled to conclude in June 2017.

HC Fivers Margareten are the defending champions, having beaten Bregenz Handball 2–0 in the previous season's playoff finals.

== Format ==
The competition format for the 2016–17 season consists of two phases, both played in a home-and-away double round-robin system. The first five teams qualifies for a first play-off round, while the last five plays a play-down round. At the end of this second round, the five teams of the play-off round and the top three teams of the play-down round plays elimination rounds. The last two plays a relegation round.

== Teams ==
2016–17 Handball Liga Austria teams

The following 10 clubs compete in the Handball Liga Austria during the 2016–17 season. HSG Bärnbach/Köflach was relegated from the previous season and SC Ferlach was promoted from 2015-16 Handball Bundesliga Austria.

Team	City	Arena
Alpla HC Hard	Hard	Sporthalle am See
Bregenz Handball	Bregenz	Handball-Arena Rieden Vorkloster
Sparkasse Schwaz Handball Tirol	Schwaz	Osthalle Schwaz
HC Fivers Wat Margareten	Wien	Sporthalle Margareten
HC Bruck	Bruck an der Mur	Hannes-Bammer-Sporthalle
HC Linz AG	Linz	Sport-Neue Mittelschule Linz Kleinmünchen
Moser Medical UHK Krems	Krems an der Donau	Sport • Halle • Krems
SC kelag Ferlach	Ferlach	Ballspielhalle Ferlach
SG Insignis Handball West Wien	Wien	BSFZ Südstadt
Union Juri Leoben	Leoben	Sporthalle Leoben-Donawitz

== First phase ==
=== Standings ===
Pos	Team	Pld	W	D	L	GF	GA	GD	Pts	Qualification
1	Alpla HC Hard	18	13	1	4	549	465	+84	27	Top; Play-offs
2	HC Fivers Wat Margareten	18	12	0	6	530	479	+51	24	Top; Play-offs
3	Bregenz Handball	18	11	0	7	513	472	+41	22	Top; Play-offs
4	Moser Medical UHK Krems	18	10	2	6	523	494	+29	22	Top; Play-offs
5	SG Insignis Handball West Wien	18	9	3	6	511	488	+23	21	Top; Play-offs
6	Sparkasse Schwaz Handball Tirol	18	9	3	6	498	471	+27	21	Bottom; Play-offs
7	SC kelag Ferlach	18	8	1	9	510	557	−47	17	Bottom; Play-offs
8	HC Linz AG	18	7	0	11	498	553	−55	14	Bottom; Play-offs
9	Union Juri Leoben	18	3	1	14	477	530	−53	7	Bottom; Play-offs
10	HC Bruck	18	2	1	15	422	522	−100	5	Bottom; Play-offs

Source: Handball Liga Austria

=== Results ===
Home \ Away	ALP	BRE	BRU	FER	FIV	KRE	LEO	LIN	TIR	WES
Alpla HC Hard		29–25	27–19	38–20	37–30	31–31	29–23	40–27	27–26	30–26
Bregenz Handball	23–22		27–22	25–24	25–26	32–28	38–22	32–23	34–27	25–23
HC Bruck	28–34	26–33		31–32	29–28	25–32	21–31	24–34	21–33	25–25
SC kelag Ferlach	30–37	33–29	26–22		27–30	30–28	28–27	39–36	29–35	29–32
HC Fivers Wat Margareten	30–22	27–25	27–18	42–21		28–26	33–27	35–23	25–23	27–22
Moser Medical UHK Krems	25–26	31–30	30–20	32–33	30–24		29–28	32–29	29–26	35–30
Union Juri Leoben	22–37	27–31	25–32	28–33	28–29	23–24		31–36	29–29	29–23
HC Linz AG	22–33	17–23	21–19	32–27	36–35	27–30	33–30		30–29	24–30
Sparkasse Schwaz Handball Tirol	27–21	31–28	26–20	26–26	25–24	26–25	21–20	32–23		28–28
SG Insignis Handball West Wien	31–29	34–28	31–20	27–23	35–30	26–26	24–27	32–25	32–28	

Legend: Blue = home team win; Yellow = draw; Red = away team win.

== Second phase ==
The points obtained during the regular season were halved (and rounded up) before the start of the playoff.

=== Top play-offs ===
Pos	Team	Pld	W	D	L	GF	GA	GD	Pts	Qualification	ALP	FIV	BRE	KRE	WES
1	Alpla HC Hard	8	7	1	0	254	218	+36	29	Play-offs		32–31	32–19	37–29	29–26
2	HC Fivers Wat Margareten	8	5	1	2	255	236	+19	23	Play-offs	34–34		30–26	29–26	37–26
3	Bregenz Handball	8	4	0	4	222	220	+2	19	Play-offs	24–27	37–31		28–26	35–23
4	Moser Medical UHK Krems	8	1	1	6	214	238	−24	14	Play-offs	27–34	27–29	24–27		26–25
5	SG Insignis Handball West Wien	8	1	1	6	212	245	−33	14	Play-offs	28–29	28–34	27–26	29–29	

Source: Handball Liga Austria

=== Bottom play-offs ===
Pos	Team	Pld	W	D	L	GF	GA	GD	Pts	Relegation	TIR	LIN	FER	LEO	BRU
1	Sparkasse Schwaz Handball Tirol	8	7	1	0	225	187	+38	26	Play-offs		26–26	29–24	26–25	29–19
2	HC Linz AG	8	3	2	3	214	218	−4	15	Play-offs	21–28		31–31	27–28	21–20
3	SC kelag Ferlach	8	2	1	5	221	236	−15	14	Play-offs	28–32	31–33		28–32	26–30
4	Union Juri Leoben	8	4	1	3	214	202	+12	13	Play-down	23–26	30–22	29–30		22–22
5	HC Bruck	8	1	1	6	177	208	−31	6	Play-down	21–29	24–33	20–23	21–25	

Source: Handball Liga Austria

== Play-offs ==
Quarterfinals
1	Alpla HC Hard	30	36
8	SC kelag Ferlach	20	15
4	Moser Medical UHK Krems	35	31	22
5	SG Insignis Handball West Wien	27	32	26
2	HC Fivers Wat Margareten	30	28
7	HC Linz AG	29	25
3	Bregenz Handball	24	23
6	Sparkasse Schwaz Handball Tirol	27	28

Semifinals
1	Alpla HC Hard	30	29	30
5	SG Insignis Handball West Wien	20	30	25
2	HC Fivers Wat Margareten	35	25
6	Sparkasse Schwaz Handball Tirol	32	24

Finals
1	Alpla HC Hard	27	32
2	HC Fivers Wat Margareten	26	30

== Relegation ==
19 May; 19:00	Union Juri Leoben	28–21	HC Bruck	Sporthalle Leoben/Donawitz, Leoben

22 May; 20:00	HC Bruck	25–23	Union Juri Leoben	Sporthalle Bruck/Mur, Bruck an der Mur

29 May; 19:00	Union Juri Leoben	30–31	HC Bruck	Sporthalle Leoben/Donawitz, Leoben

HC Bruck won 2-1, Union Juri Leoben is relegated.
