= Saint-Raphaël Var Handball =

French handball club

- Full name: Saint-Raphaël Var Handball
- Founded: 1963
- Arena: Palais des Sports Jean-François Krakowski
- Capacity: 2,500
- President: Pascal Bacchi
- Head coach: Benjamin Braux
- League: LNH Division 1
- 2024–25: LNH Division 1, 5th of 16
- Club colours
Home	Away

Saint-Raphaël Var Handball, is a team handball club from Saint-Raphaël, Var, France, that plays in the LNH Division 1. Saint-Raphaël Var handball, or SRVHB, is a French handball club based in Saint-Raphael in the Var region, founded in 1963. The first team has been playing in Division 1 since the 2007–2008 season and has been coached since 2019 by Rareș Fortuneanu assisted by Wissem Hmam, both former players of the club.

Even if the club has not won a title, apart from the French D2 Championship in 2007, it has accumulated places of honor including a French runner-up title in 2016, three League Cup finals, a Champions Trophy final in 2015 and an EHF European Cup (C3) final in 2018.

== History ==
The original club was founded in 1959. It was after the disaster of the Malpasset dam in Frejus on 2 December 1959 that the leaders of the two cities merged the volleyball sections of the football clubs of the two cities, the Etoile Sportive Fréjussienne and the Stade Raphaélois to create the Association Sportive Fréjus Saint-Raphaël, commonly known as ASFSR. It was in 1963, at the initiative of René Cenni, that the handball section was born. Marcel Tafani was then appointed president of the section.

In 1971, the handball section created a women's team and found a home in a sports hall inaugurated on 7 November 1972 during a match against Draguignan: the Esterel sports hall. In 1974, the town of Fréjus created the AMSLF. The Raphael section, freshly promoted to National 3, was destabilized by the loss of many elements and went down to the regional championship the following year. Three years later, in 1977, the club lost its inter-municipal status. It lost its "F" and became A. S. S. R. for Association Sportive Saint-Raphaël. Over time, the club grew and evolved. It reached the National 3 level in 1983, National 2 in 1992 and National 1 in 1994.

In 1995, the section separated from the communal club and the club was created under the name Saint-Raphaël Var Handball. The club finally reached the elite in 2004 but was relegated the following season to D2. The Palais des sports Jean-François-Krakowski was inaugurated in 2005 during a gala match against Chambéry. The club returned to the LNH two years later, in 2007, after winning the D2 championship.

Since his return in elite, coach Christian Gaudin has made the club one of the best in France, finishing 4th in 2010 and 2011 and 3rd in 2012. The club also reached the League Cup final three times (2010, 2012 and 2014), losing three times to Montpellier AHB. On March 18, 2014, the club's president announced, a year in advance, the end of Christian Gaudin's contract. He was replaced by Joël da Silva, from Toulouse, who allowed the club to reach a new level by returning to 3rd place in 2015 and becoming vice-champion of France in 2016. Under his orders, the club also reached the final of the EHF European Cup in 2018, where they lost to German club Füchse Berlin. With his contract set to expire in June 2019, Joel Da Silva has been replaced by his assistant Rareș Fortuneanu as coach. The former Romanian international, who played for Saint-Raphaël, has been assistant coach for the last 4 seasons. His assistant, Wissem Hmam also knew the SRVHB as a player.

In October 2020, Jean-François Krakowski decided to retire after 33 years at the head of the club and was replaced by Emmanuel Murzereau.

== Prize list ==
‘National competitions'	‘International competitions'
France championship (0); Vice-champion (1) : 2016.; Third : 2012, 2015.; French Cup (0); Semi-finalist : 1996 and 2003.; League's Cup (0); Finalist : 2010, 2012 and 2014.; Champions Trophy (0); Finalist : 2015, 2018.; French D2 Championship (1); Champion : 2007.	EHF Cup(C3) (0); Finalist : 2018.; Fourth : 2017.

=== Season by season review (from 2001) ===
Season	Div.	Ranking	French Cup	League's Cup	Champion's Trophy	European Cups
1993-1994	Nat.1	Finalist	N.Q	No competition	No competition	N.Q
1994-1995	Div.2	8th	2nd round	No competition	No competition	N.Q
1995-1996	Div.2	7th	1/2 final	No competition	No competition	N.Q
1996-1997	Div.2	12th	?	No competition	No competition	N.Q
1997-1998	Nat.1	?	1/8 final	No competition	No competition	N.Q
1998-1999	Nat.1?	?	?	No competition	No competition	N.Q
1999-2000	Nat.1?	?	?	No competition	No competition	N.Q
2000-2001	Nat.1?	?	?	No competition	No competition	N.Q
2001-2002	Nat.1	2nd	1/64 final	N.Q	No competition	N.Q
2002-2003	Div.2	10th	1/2 final	N.Q	No competition	N.Q
2003-2004	Div.2	2nd	No competition	N.Q	No competition	N.Q
2004-2005	Div.1	14th	?	N.Q	No competition	N.Q
2005-2006	Div.2	4th	?	N.Q	No competition	N.Q
2006-2007	Div.2	1st	1/32 final	N.Q	No competition	N.Q
2007-2008	Div.1	6th	1/4 final	1/8 final	No competition	N.Q
2008-2009	Div.1	6th	1/8 final	1/8 final	No competition	N.Q
2009-2010	Div.1	4th	1/4 final	Final	No competition	N.Q
2010-2011	Div.1	4th	1/8 final	1/4 final	N.Q	C3 : 1/4 final
2011-2012	Div.1	3rd	1/4 final	Final	3rd	C3 : 1/4 final
2012-2013	Div.1	6th	1/16 final	1st round	N.Q	C3 : 3rd round
2013-2014	Div.1	6th	1/8 final	Final	N.Q	N.Q
2014-2015	Div.1	3rd	1/8 final	1/4 final	N.Q	N.Q
2015-2016	Div.1	2nd	1/4 final	1/4 final	Final	C3 : 1/4 final
2016-2017	Div.1	4th	1/4 final	1/2 final	4th	C3 : 4th place
2017-2018	Div.1	4th	1/4 final	1/8 final	4th	C3 : Final
2018-2019	Div.1	7th	1/8 final	1/2 final	Final	C3 : 1/4 final
2019-2020	Div.1	8th	1/8 final	1/8 final	N.Q	N.Q
2020-2021	Div.1	In progress	In progress	No competition	No competition	N.Q

=== European record ===
Season	Competition	Round	Club	Home	Away	Aggregate
2025–26	EHF European League	QR	(Denmark) Mors-Thy Håndbold	45–32	35–32	80–64
2025–26	EHF European League	Group Stage	(Germany) SG Flensburg-Handewitt	29–36	30–32	3rd place
2025–26	EHF European League	Group Stage	(Romania) AHC Potaissa Turda	42–24	34–25	3rd place
2025–26	EHF European League	Group Stage	(Spain) Irudek Bidasoa Irún	35–32	25–33	3rd place
2018–19	EHF Cup	R3	(Israel) Maccabi Srugo Rishon LeZion	27–30	36–29	63–59
2018–19	EHF Cup	Group Stage	(Germany) Füchse Berlin	34–31	29–33	2nd place
2018–19	EHF Cup	Group Stage	(Spain) Logroño La Rioja	30–26	28–29	2nd place
2018–19	EHF Cup	Group Stage	(Hungary) Balatonfüredi	27–23	32–27	2nd place
2018–19	EHF Cup	QF	(Portugal) FC Porto	30–30	30–34	60–64
2017–18	EHF Cup	R3	(Croatia) RK Dubrava	40–29	41–31	81–60
2017–18	EHF Cup	Group Stage	(Germany) Füchse Berlin	25–34	26–21	2nd place
2017–18	EHF Cup	Group Stage	(Spain) Helvetia Anaitasuna	36–27	38–29	2nd place
2017–18	EHF Cup	Group Stage	(Sweden) Lugi HF	28–26	30–28	2nd place
2017–18	EHF Cup	QF	(Spain) Fraikin Granollers	37–23	30–40	67–63
2017–18	EHF Cup	SF	(Germany) SC Magdeburg	28–27		
2017–18	EHF Cup	Final	(Germany) Füchse Berlin	25–28		
2016–17	EHF Cup	R3	(Belarus) SKA Minsk	33–25	28–30	61–55
2016–17	EHF Cup	Group Stage	(Germany) Füchse Berlin	27–21	31–33	2nd place
2016–17	EHF Cup	Group Stage	(Denmark) GOG	32–36	32–28	2nd place
2016–17	EHF Cup	Group Stage	(Slovenia) RD Ribnica	26–22	31–24	2nd place
2016–17	EHF Cup	QF	(Germany) MT Melsungen	30–26	31–23	61–49
2016–17	EHF Cup	SF	(Germany) Füchse Berlin	24–35		
2016–17	EHF Cup	Third place	(Germany) SC Magdeburg	31–32		

=== Evolution of the SRVHB budget ===
Season	Budget	Evolution
2011/12	€2440000	▲
2012/13	€2875600	▲
2013/14	€3500000	▲
2014/15	€3590000	▲
2015/16	€3720000	▲
2016/17	€4000000	▲
2017/18	€4180000	▲
2018/19	€4200000	▲
2019/20	€4280000	▲
2020/21	€3890000	▼

== Current squad ==
=== Squad of 2023-2024 season ===
Goalkeepers

- 1 (Brazil) Rangel da Rosa
- 16 (France) Mickaël Robin

Wingers
LW

- 20 (France) Raphaël Caucheteux
- 97 (France) Drevy Paschal

RW

- 10 (France) Martial Caïs
- 24 (France) Arthur Vigneron

Line players

- 8 (France) Jonathan Mapu
- 36 (France) Johannes Marescot
- 66 (France) Antoine-Xavier Armani

Back players
LB

- 15 (Slovenia) Nik Henigman
- 17 (France) Benjamin Bataille
- 22 (France) Noah Kouadio

CB

- 5 (France) Mihailo Vojinovic
- 9 (Spain) Chema Márquez
- 28 (Spain) Sergio Pérez Manzanares

RB

- 32 (France) Adrien Dipanda (c)
- 93 (France) Mike Brasseleur

=== Transfers ===
Transfers for the 2026–27 season

Joining

- (Ukraine) Illia Blyzniuk (RB) from (Czech Republic) HCB Karviná
- (France) Noah Kouadio (LB) back from loan at (France) US Saintes Handball

Leaving

- (Spain) Chema Márquez (LB) to (Spain) BM Proin Triana
- (Sweden) Andreas Lang (RB) to (Denmark) HØJ Elite
- (France) Drevy Paschal (LW) to (France) Montpellier Handball

=== Transfer History ===
Transfers for the 2025–26 season

Joining

- (Spain) Jorge Pérez Molina (GK) from (Spain) CB Cangas
- (France) Marc Leyvigne (RW) from (France) Nancy Handball
- (France) Antonin Mohamed (LW) from (France) Saran Loiret Handball

Leaving

- (Brazil) Rangel da Rosa (GK) to (Portugal) S.L. Benfica
- (France) Martial Caïs (RW) to (Portugal) Póvoa AC
- (France) Noah Kouadio (LB) on loan at (France) US Saintes Handball

== Club-related players ==
In 'bold' , players currently at the club.

- (France) Aurélien Abily : from 2009 to 2018.
- (Iceland) Arnór Atlason : from 2013 to 2016.
- (France) Xavier Barachet : from 2013 to 2014 since 2017.
- (France) Johan Boisedu : from 2007 to 2010.
- (France) Raphaël Caucheteux : since 2007.
- (France) Adrien Dipanda : since 2012.
- (Serbia) Slaviša Đukanović : from 2007 to 2017.
- (Romania) Dan Rares Fortuneanu : from 2004 to 2013.
- (France) Christian Gaudin : from 2003 to 2006.
- (Tunisia) Wissem Hmam : from 2014 to 2018.
- (Czech Republic) David Juříček : from 2011 to 2013.
- (Czech Republic) Miroslav Jurka : from 2013 to 2019.

- (France) Nicolas Krakowski : from 2007 to 2021.
- (France) Geoffroy Krantz : from 2011 to 2018.
- (Denmark) Alexander Lynggaard : from 2013 to 2020.
- (Tunisia) Heykel Megannem : from 2009 to March 2013.
- (France) Nicolas Moretti : from 2007 to 2013.
- (Denmark) Morten Olsen : from 2013 to 2015.
- (France) Yohann Ploquin : from 2009 to 2013.
- (Romania) Mihai Popescu : since 2016.
- (Spain) Daniel Sarmiento Melián : since 2016.
- (Romania) Alexandru Șimicu : since 2015.
- (Czech Republic) Jan Stehlík : from 2009 to 2017.
- (France) Arthur Vigneron : since 2012.

=== Individual distinctions ===
Season	Laureates	Positions
2014-2015	Adrien Dipanda	Best Right Backcourt
2015-2016	Joël da Silva	Best coach
2017-2018	Raphaël Caucheteux	Top scorer with 167 goals.
2018-2019	Raphaël Caucheteux	Top scorer with 179 goals.
2019-2020	Raphaël Caucheteux	Top scorer with 145 goals.

=== Top scorers in the history of SRVHB in the league ===
In 'bold' , players currently at the club. Updated on April 30, 2020.

N°	Players	Nbr. of matches	Nbr. Of goals	Nat.	Passed in France by
1	Raphaël Caucheteux	330	1826	(France)	Montpellier HB (25 matches - 30 goals)
2	Aurélien Abily	205	699	(France)	Angers Noyant and Aurillac HB CA (24 matches - 121 goals)
3	Adrien Dipanda	189	508	(France)	Montpellier HB (59 matches - 73 goals)
4	Jan Stehlik	169	494	(Czech Republic)	
5	Dan Rares Fortuneanu	157	449	(Romania)	
6	Heykel Megannem	90	405	(Tunisia)	SC Sélestat, USAM Nîmes (47 matches - 279 goals) and Montpellier HB (26 matches - 72 goals)
7	Alexander Lynggaard	155	382	(Denmark)	
8	Alexandre Tomas	148	344	(France)	Montpellier HB (49 matches - 69 goals) and Tremblay-en-France (50 matches - 108 goals)
9	Miroslav Jurka	126	302	(Czech Republic)	
10	Alexandru Șimicu	91	291	(Romania)	
11	Arnaud Chapuis	79	280	(France)	
12	Daniel Sarmiento Melián	77	272	(Spain)	
13	Johan Boisedu	70	263	(France)	Saint-Marcel Vernon Handball (22 matches - 140 goals) and US Ivry (13 matches - 25 goals)
14	Geoffroy Krantz	107	261	(France)	Montpellier HB (67 matches - 120 goals)
15	Morten Olsen	45	222	(Denmark)	

== Other personalities linked to the club ==
In 'bold' , players currently at the club.

=== Coaches ===
- (Bosnia and Herzegovina) Željko Anić : coach from ? to 2004.
- (France) Rudy Bertsch : coach from 2004 to 2005.
- (France) Christian Gaudin : coach from 2005 to 2014.
- (France) Joël da Silva : coach from 2014 to 2019, assisted by Rareș Fortuneanu.
- (Romania) Rareș Fortuneanu : coach since 2019, assisted by Wissem Hmam.

=== List of presidents ===
- Marcel Tafani : 1963-1965
- Jacky Soler : 1965-1974 then 1976-1977
- Alain Sanchez : 1974-1976
- Maurice Odin : 1977-1984
- Guy Rivard : 1984-1987
- Jean-François Krakowski : 1987-2020
- Emmanuel Murzereau : since October 2020

=== Organigram of SRVHB ===
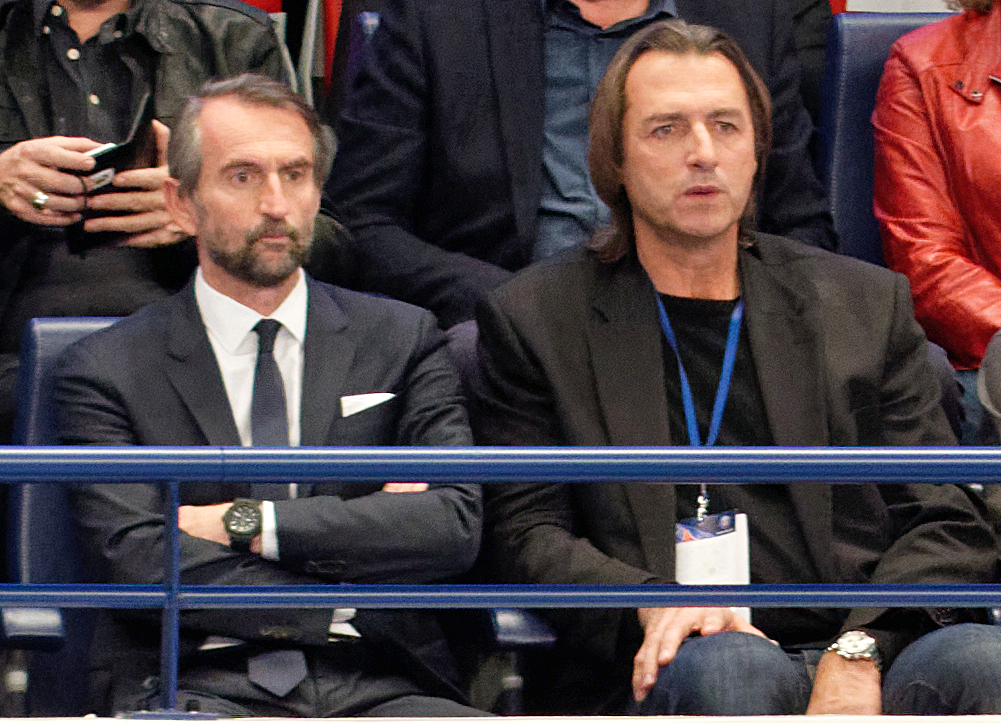
Jean-François Krakowski (right) next to Jean-Claude Blanc (Deputy General Manager of PSG) during the LidlStarLigue championship match between PSG and Saint-Raphaël. In Coubertin, December 8, 2016.

Saint-Raphaël Var Handball (SAOS)

- Director's office
  - Chairman of the board : Emmanuel Murzereau
  - Board of directors : Emmanuel Murzereau, Jean-Pierre Gaspari, Frédéric Tibéri, Alain Bessou and Pascal Bacchi
  - General Manager : Émeric Paillasson
  - Supervisory Board (12 members), chaired by Jean-François Saulay
- Technical staff
  - Coach : Rareș Fortuneanu
  - Assistant coach : Wissem Hmam
  - Sports manager of the formation center : Romain Conte
  - Logistics manager : Pierre Luhern
- Medical staff
  - Club doctor : Dr Michel Ducasse
  - Physiotherapist : Thomas Montagnon and Mickaël Joulin
- Association (Saint-Raphaël Var Handball Association)
  - President : André Gongora
  - Communication manager : Valentine Dumont-Musso
- Permanents members of the structure
  - Administrative manager : Patricia Garcia-Gaspari
  - Communication / Press Manager : Kelly Texier
  - Marketing Manager / Club of Partners : Adrien Protais

== Gallery ==
=== Players ===
Saint-Raphaël Var Handball in March 2016

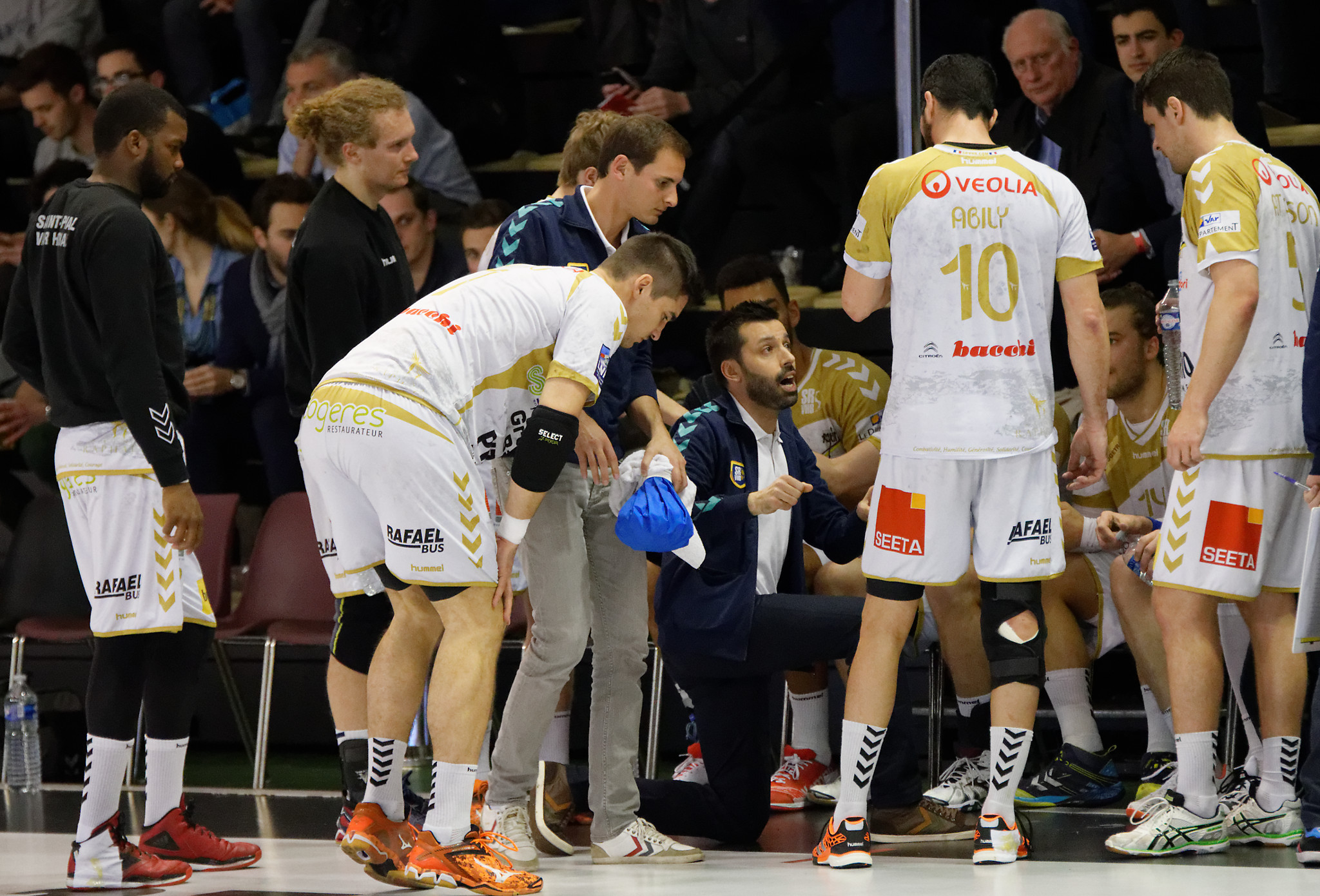
Joël da Silva and his players during a timeout.

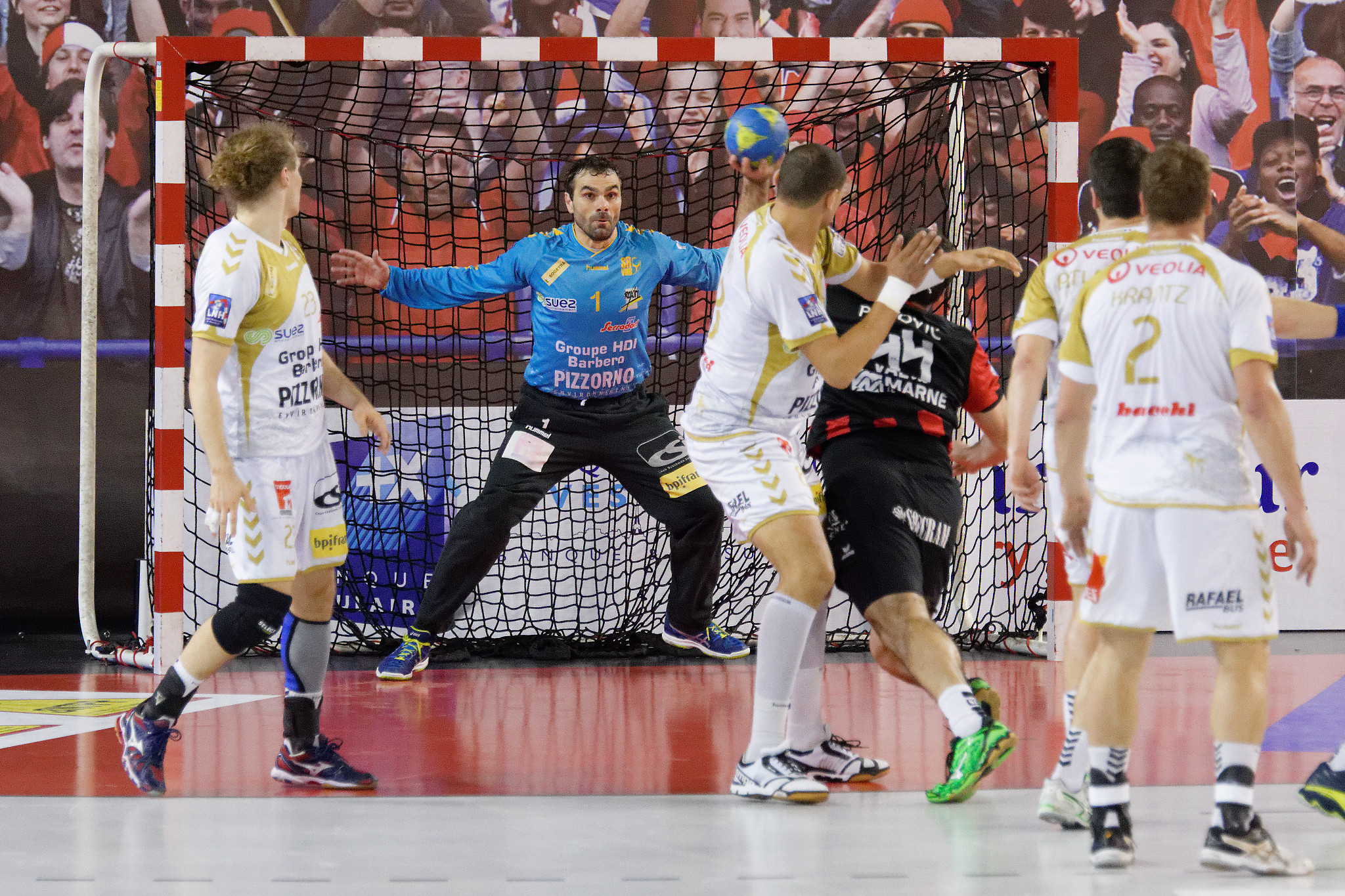
Slaviša Đukanović, last bulwark of defense.

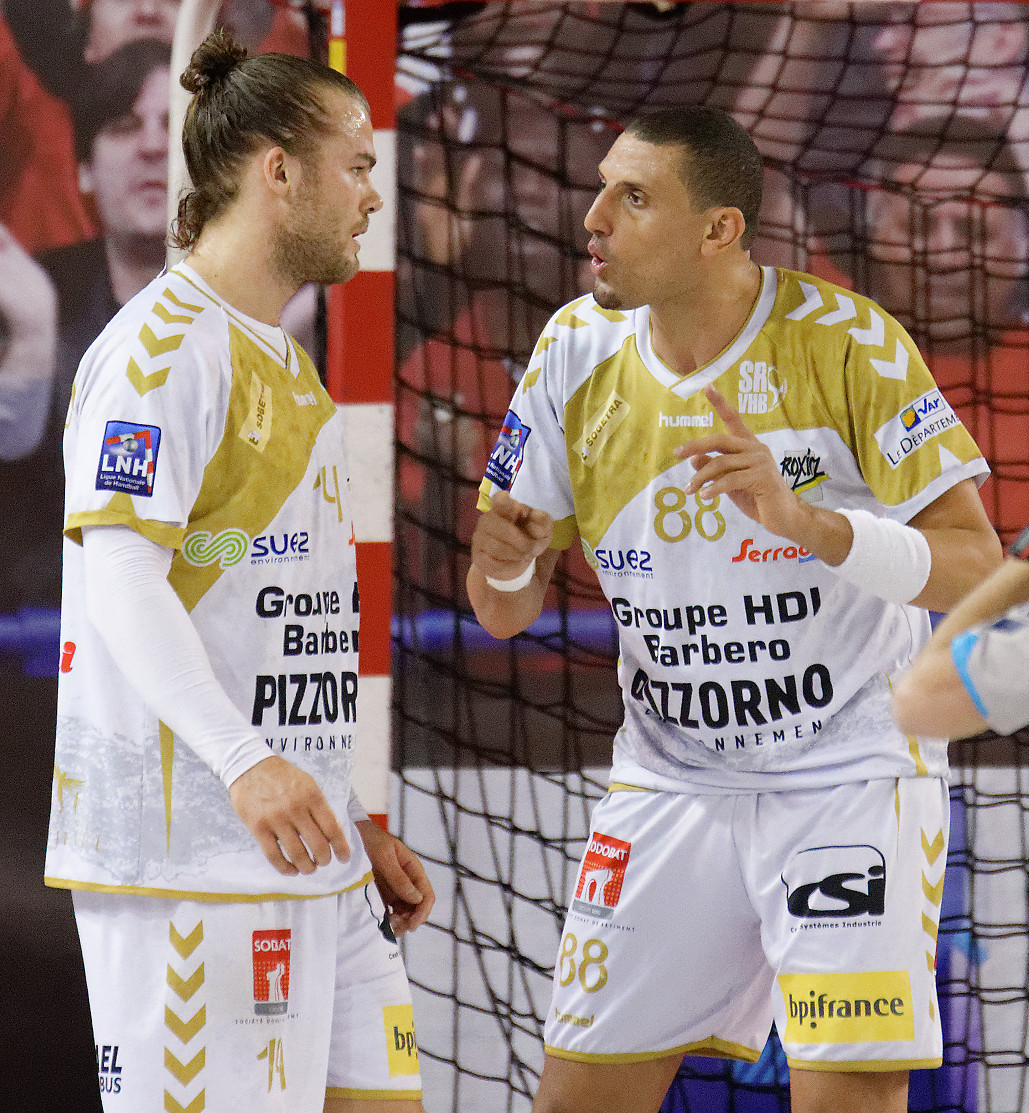
Wissem Hmam and Alexander Lynggaard.

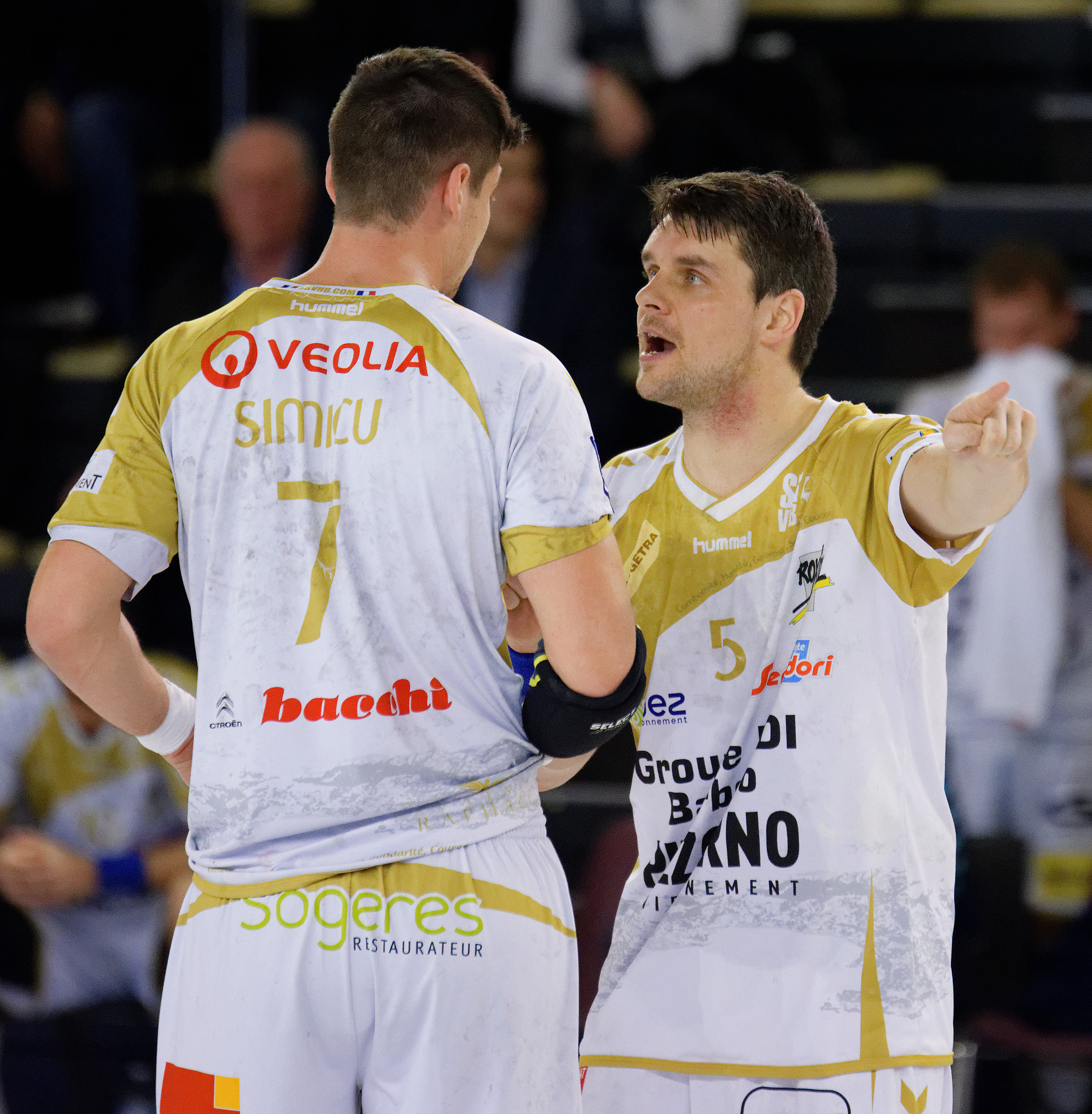
Arnór Atlason and Alexandru Șimicu.
