= Slaviša Đukanović =

Serbian handball player (born 1979)

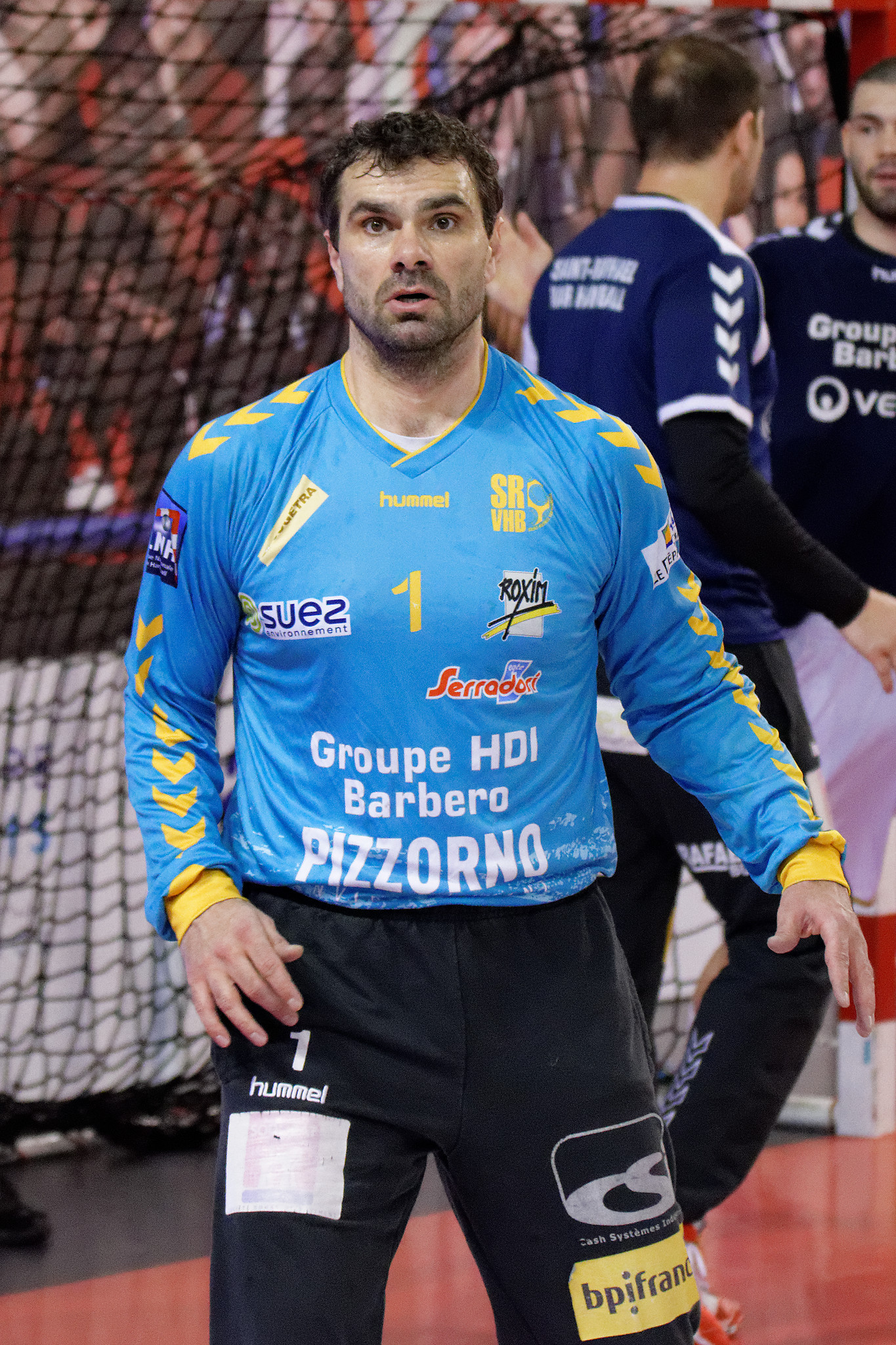

Personal information
- Nationality: Serbian
- Born: 3 May 1979 (age 47) Belgrade, Serbia
- Height: 1.90 m (6 ft 3 in)

Sport
- Sport: Handball
- Position: Goalkeeper
- Current club: Retired

Senior clubs
- Years: Team
- –: Stari-Grad Belgrad
- –: RK Šamot 65
- –: RK Proleter Zrenjanin
- –2002: RK Priboj
- 2002–2004: Cavigal Nice Handball
- 2004–2006: Saint-Marcel Vernon Handball
- 2006–2007: Girondins de Bordeaux HBC
- 2007–2017: Saint-Raphaël Handball
- 2017: Pays d'Aix Université Club
National team
Years	Team	Apps	(Gls)
–	Serbia	12	(0)

Teams managed
- 2018–: Pays d'Aix Université Club

Slaviša Đukanović (born 3 May 1979) is a Serbian handball coach and former player who is currently the goalkeeping coach for French club Pays d'Aix Université Club. As a player he was part of the Serbian national team.
