= Raphaël Caucheteux =

French handball player (born 1985)

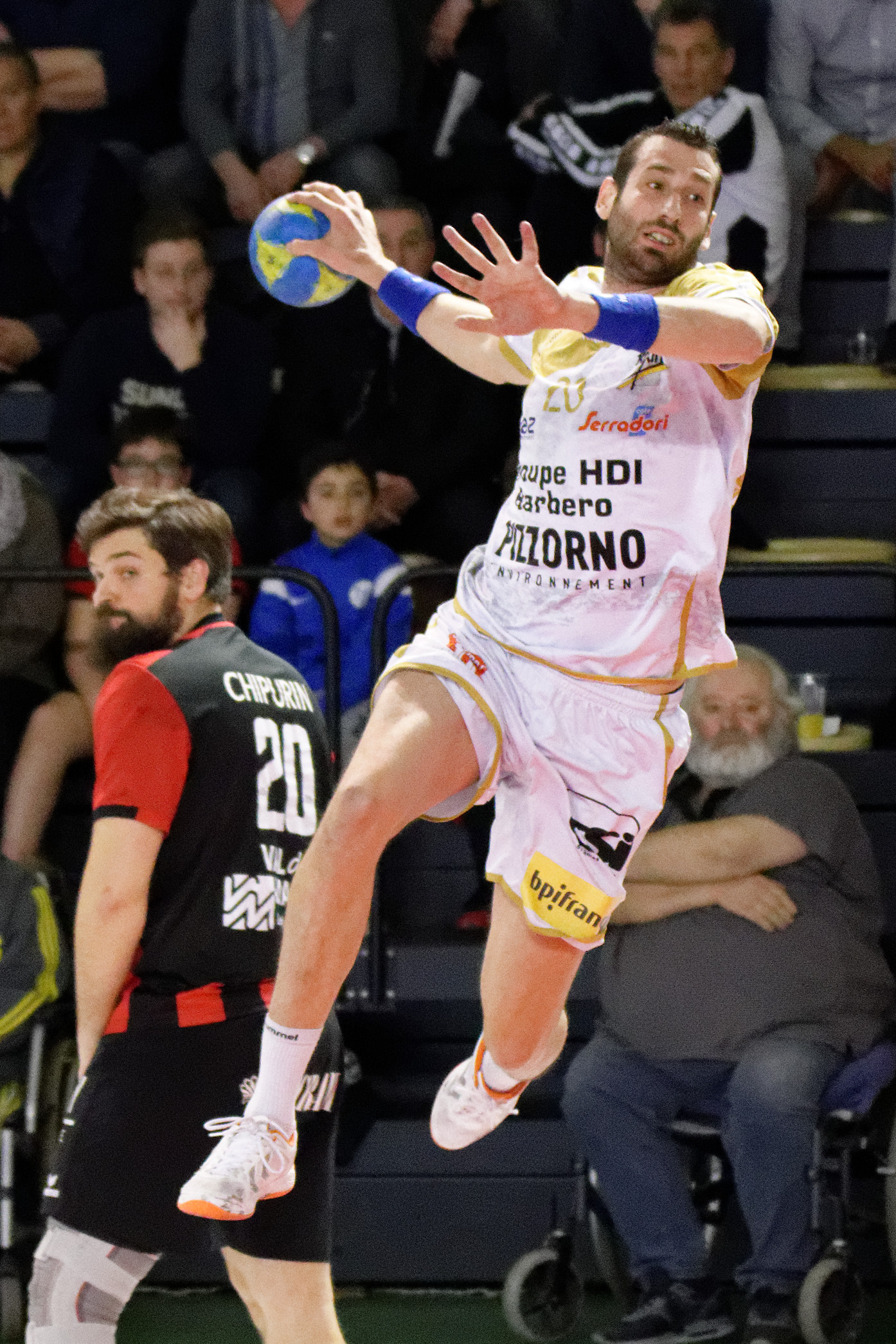
- Caucheteux in 2016

Personal information
- Nationality: French
- Born: 9 May 1985 (age 41) Montpellier, France
- Height: 2.02 m (6 ft 8 in)

Sport
- Sport: Handball
- Position: Left wing
- Current club: Saint-Raphaël Var Handball
- Number: 20

Youth career
- Years: Team
- 2001-2004: Montpellier Handball

Senior clubs
- Years: Team
- 2004-2007: Montpellier Handball
- 2007-2025: Saint-Raphaël Var Handball
National team
Years	Team	Apps	(Gls)
2018-2022	France	20	(68)
Medal record
European Championship
Bronze medal – third place	2018 Croatia
Mediterranean Games
Silver medal – second place	2009 Pescara	Team
- Updated on 20 January 2026

Raphaël Caucheteux (born 9 May 1985) is a French former handball player for the French national team. He played almost all his career for Saint-Raphaël Var Handball from 2007, where he joined from Montpellier Handball.

He was part of the French team that won the bronze medal at the 2018 European Men's Handball Championship.
